= 2017–18 in Cypriot football =

Football in Cyprus
- Season: 2017–18

Men's football
- First Division: APOEL
- Second Division: E.N. Paralimni
- Third Division: Onisilos
- STOK Elite Division: Kouris Erimis
- Cup: AEK Larnaca
- Super Cup: Apollon

The following article is a summary of the 2017–18 football season in Cyprus, which is the 76th season of competitive football in the country and runs from August 2017 to May 2018.

== League tables ==
=== Cypriot First Division ===
==== Regular season ====
Pos	Team	Pld	W	D	L	GF	GA	GD	Pts	Qualification or relegation
1	APOEL	26	20	3	3	72	25	+47	63	Qualification for the Championship round
2	Apollon Limassol	26	18	7	1	67	15	+52	61	Qualification for the Championship round
3	Anorthosis Famagusta	26	16	8	2	41	17	+24	56	Qualification for the Championship round
4	AEK Larnaca	26	16	5	5	57	24	+33	53	Qualification for the Championship round
5	AEL Limassol	26	14	6	6	35	17	+18	48	Qualification for the Championship round
6	Omonia	26	13	5	8	51	38	+13	44	Qualification for the Championship round
7	Doxa Katokopias	26	10	4	12	35	40	−5	34	Qualification for the Relegation round
8	Ermis Aradippou	26	9	3	14	35	49	−14	30	Qualification for the Relegation round
9	Pafos FC	26	6	8	12	23	38	−15	26	Qualification for the Relegation round
10	Nea Salamis Famagusta	26	6	6	14	28	46	−18	24	Qualification for the Relegation round
11	Alki Oroklini	26	6	5	15	30	57	−27	23	Qualification for the Relegation round
12	Olympiakos Nicosia	26	4	8	14	22	55	−33	20	Qualification for the Relegation round
13	Aris Limassol (R)	26	3	7	16	19	49	−30	16	Relegation to the Cypriot Second Division
14	Ethnikos Achna (R)	26	1	5	20	19	64	−45	8	Relegation to the Cypriot Second Division

Source: CFA (in Greek)
Rules for classification: 1) Points; 2) Head-to-head points; 3) Head-to-head goal difference; 4) Head-to-head goals scored; 5) Head-to-head away goals scored (only if two teams); 6) Goal difference; 7) Goals scored; 8) Play-off (only if deciding championship round, relegation round or relegation).
(R) Relegated

==== Play-offs ====
Pos	Team	Pld	W	D	L	GF	GA	GD	Pts	Qualification
1	APOEL (C)	36	27	5	4	92	35	+57	86	Qualification for the Champions League first qualifying round
2	Apollon Limassol	36	25	7	4	90	26	+64	82	Qualification for the Europa League first qualifying round
3	Anorthosis Famagusta	36	19	12	5	53	29	+24	69	Qualification for the Europa League first qualifying round
4	AEK Larnaca	36	20	8	8	74	39	+35	68	Qualification for the Europa League second qualifying round (Note: AEK Larnaca qualified for the Europa League second qualifying round by winning the 2017–18 Cypriot Cup.)
5	AEL Limassol	36	17	7	12	47	38	+9	58	
6	Omonia	36	14	5	17	58	60	−2	47	

Source: CFA (in Greek)
Rules for classification: 1) Points; 2) Head-to-head points; 3) Head-to-head goal difference; 4) Head-to-head goals scored; 5) Head-to-head away goals scored (only if two teams); 6) Goal difference; 7) Goals scored; 8) Play-off (only if deciding champion or UEFA competitions).
(C) Champions
Notes:

Pos	Team	Pld	W	D	L	GF	GA	GD	Pts	Relegation
7	Nea Salamis Famagusta	36	14	6	16	53	55	−2	48	
8	Ermis Aradippou	36	14	4	18	50	64	−14	46 (Note: Head to head record: Doxa 2–1 Ermis, Ermis 1–2 Doxa, Doxa 2–3 Ermis, Ermis 2–1 Doxa.)	
9	Doxa Katokopias	36	14	4	18	54	63	−9	46	
10	Pafos FC	36	11	9	16	36	51	−15	42	
11	Alki Oroklini	36	11	6	19	48	73	−25	39	
12	Olympiakos Nicosia (R)	36	5	9	22	34	81	−47	24	Relegation to the Cypriot Second Division

Source: CFA
Rules for classification: 1) Points; 2) Head-to-head points; 3) Head-to-head goal difference; 4) Head-to-head goals scored; 5) Head-to-head away goals scored (only if two teams); 6) Goal difference; 7) Goals scored; 8) Play-off (only if deciding champion or UEFA competitions).
(R) Relegated

=== Cypriot Second Division ===
Pos	Team	Pld	W	D	L	GF	GA	GD	Pts	Qualification or relegation
1	Enosis Neon Paralimni (C, P)	26	18	6	2	54	20	+34	60	Promotion to Cypriot First Division
2	Anagennisi Deryneia	26	18	5	3	53	23	+30	59	
3	Othellos Athienou	26	16	6	4	45	18	+27	54	
4	Ayia Napa	26	13	3	10	43	33	+10	42	
5	AEZ Zakakiou	26	12	5	9	36	26	+10	41	
6	Omonia Aradippou	26	11	5	10	39	32	+7	38	
7	Karmiotissa	26	9	10	7	41	36	+5	37	
8	ASIL Lysi	26	8	8	10	32	35	−3	32	
9	PAEEK	26	8	7	11	33	40	−7	31	
10	Digenis Oroklinis	26	7	7	12	29	50	−21	28	
11	THOI Lakatamia	26	6	8	12	25	39	−14	26	
12	P.O. Xylotymbou (R)	26	7	5	14	29	44	−15	26	Relegation to the Cypriot Third Division
13	Ethnikos Assia (R)	26	4	6	16	22	42	−20	18	Relegation to the Cypriot Third Division
14	Chalkanoras Idaliou (R)	26	3	3	20	23	65	−42	12	Relegation to the Cypriot Third Division

Source: CFA (in Greek)
Rules for classification: 1) Points; 2) Head-to-head points; 3) Head-to-head goal difference; 4) Head-to-head goals scored; 5) Head-to-head away goals scored (only if two teams); 6) Goal difference; 7) Goals scored; 8) Play-off (only if deciding championship round, relegation round or relegation).
(C) Champions; (P) Promoted; (R) Relegated

=== Cypriot Third Division ===
Pos	Team	Pld	W	D	L	GF	GA	GD	Pts	Qualification or relegation
1	Onisilos Sotira 2014 (C, P)	30	21	5	4	60	22	+38	68	Promotion to the Cypriot Second Division
2	MEAP Nisou (P)	30	19	6	5	67	31	+36	63	Promotion to the Cypriot Second Division
3	Akritas Chlorakas (P)	30	17	7	6	44	22	+22	58	Promotion to the Cypriot Second Division
4	Enosi Neon Ypsona-Digenis Ipsona	30	14	6	10	61	45	+16	48	
5	ENAD Polis Chrysochous	30	13	8	9	47	35	+12	47	
6	Elpida Astromeriti	30	13	7	10	44	36	+8	46	
7	Peyia 2014	30	13	6	11	41	48	−7	45	
8	APEA Akrotiriou	30	12	5	13	35	39	−4	41	
9	Achyronas Liopetriou	30	10	8	12	41	47	−6	38 (Note: Head to head record: Achyronas 2–1 Ormideia, Ormideia 0–0 Achyronas.)	
10	Ormideia FC	30	10	8	12	33	35	−2	38	
11	Ethnikos Latsion	30	10	7	13	45	55	−10	37	
12	Digenis Akritas Morphou	30	8	12	10	45	47	−2	36	
13	Olympias Lympion	30	11	2	17	45	60	−15	35	
14	APEP FC (R)	30	9	5	16	36	46	−10	32	Relegation to the STOK Elite Division
15	Finikas Ayias Marinas Chrysochous (R)	30	4	8	18	23	51	−28	20	Relegation to the STOK Elite Division
16	Livadiakos/Salamina Livadion (Note: Livadiakos/Salamina Livadion were deducted three points for financial reasons.) (R)	30	3	6	21	35	73	−38	12	Relegation to the STOK Elite Division

Source: CFA
Rules for classification: 1) Points; 2) Head-to-head points; 3) Head-to-head goal difference; 4) Head-to-head goals scored; 5) Head-to-head away goals scored (only if two teams); 6) Goal difference; 7) Goals scored; 8) Play-off (only if deciding championship round, relegation round or relegation).
(C) Champions; (P) Promoted; (R) Relegated

=== STOK Elite Division ===
Pos	Team	Pld	W	D	L	GF	GA	GD	Pts	Qualification or relegation
1	Kouris Erimis (C, P)	26	17	6	3	69	27	+42	57	Promotion to Cypriot Third Division
2	Omonia Psevda (P)	26	16	8	2	54	22	+32	56	Promotion to Cypriot Third Division
3	Amathus Ayiou Tychona (P)	26	15	6	5	53	24	+29	51	Promotion to Cypriot Third Division
4	Iraklis Gerolakkou	26	11	5	10	47	57	−10	38	
5	Doxa Paliometochou	26	10	7	9	35	23	+12	37	
6	Rotsidis Mammari	26	10	6	10	47	35	+12	36	
7	Atlas Aglandjias	26	10	4	12	42	42	0	34 (Note: Head to head record: Atlas 1–0 Elia, Elia 2–1 Atlas.)	
8	Elia Lythrodonta	26	10	4	12	34	41	−7	34	
9	AEN Ayiou Georgiou Vrysoullon-Acheritou	26	9	6	11	36	40	−4	33 (Note: Head to head record: AEN 2–1 Orfeas, Orfeas 3–3 AEN.)	
10	Orfeas Nicosia	26	9	6	11	36	40	−4	33	
11	Elpida Xylofagou (R)	26	8	6	12	26	32	−6	30	Relegation to the regional leagues
12	Frenaros FC 2000 (R)	26	7	8	11	26	35	−9	29	Relegation to the regional leagues
13	Kornos FC 2013 (R)	26	6	9	11	34	43	−9	27	Relegation to the regional leagues
14	Poseidonas Giolou (R)	26	1	5	20	15	93	−78	8	Relegation to the regional leagues

Source: CFA
Rules for classification: 1) Points; 2) Head-to-head points; 3) Head-to-head goal difference; 4) Head-to-head goals scored; 5) Head-to-head away goals scored (only if two teams); 6) Goal difference; 7) Goals scored; 8) Play-off (only if deciding championship round, relegation round or relegation).
(C) Champions; (P) Promoted; (R) Relegated

=== 2018 FIFA World Cup qualifiers ===
31 August 2017	Cyprus	3–2	Bosnia and Herzegovina	GSP Stadium, Nicosia
21:45 UTC+3	Christofi 65'; Laban 67'; Sotiriou 76'	Report (FIFA); Report (UEFA)	Šunjić 33'; Višća 44'	Attendance: 4,143; Referee: Andre Marriner (England)

3 September 2017	Estonia	1–0	Cyprus	A. Le Coq Arena, Tallinn
19:00 UTC+3	Käit 90+2'	Report (FIFA); Report (UEFA)		Attendance: 5,491; Referee: Adrien Jaccottet (Switzerland)

7 October 2017	Cyprus	1–2	Greece	GSP Stadium, Nicosia
21:45 UTC+3	Sotiriou 17'	Report (FIFA); Report (UEFA)	Mitroglou 25'; Tziolis 26'	Attendance: 7,222; Referee: Alberto Undiano Mallenco (Spain)

10 October 2017	Belgium	4–0	Cyprus	King Baudouin Stadium, Brussels
20:45 UTC+2	E. Hazard 12', 63' (pen.); T. Hazard 52'; Lukaku 78'	Report (FIFA); Report (UEFA)		Attendance: 37,765; Referee: Luca Banti (Italy)
