= 2016–17 in Cypriot football =

Football in Cyprus
- Season: 2016–17

Men's football
- First Division: APOEL
- Second Division: Alki Oroklini
- Third Division: P.O. Xylotymbou
- STOK Elite Division: Onisilos
- Cup: Apollon
- Super Cup: Apollon

The following article is a summary of the 2016–17 football season in Cyprus, which is the 75th season of competitive football in the country and runs from August 2016 to May 2017.

== League tables ==
=== Cypriot First Division ===
==== Regular season ====
Pos	Team	Pld	W	D	L	GF	GA	GD	Pts	Qualification or relegation
1	APOEL	26	19	5	2	62	16	+46	62	Qualification for the championship round
2	AEK Larnaca	26	17	7	2	54	19	+35	58	Qualification for the championship round
3	Apollon Limassol	26	17	6	3	56	19	+37	57	Qualification for the championship round
4	AEL Limassol	26	15	6	5	40	22	+18	51	Qualification for the championship round
5	Omonia	26	15	5	6	56	37	+19	50	Qualification for the championship round
6	Anorthosis Famagusta	26	10	9	7	39	27	+12	39	Qualification for the championship round
7	Ermis Aradippou	26	10	5	11	35	41	−6	35	Qualification for the relegation round
8	Nea Salamis Famagusta	26	8	7	11	22	33	−11	31	Qualification for the relegation round
9	Ethnikos Achna	26	8	6	12	42	46	−4	30	Qualification for the relegation round
10	Karmiotissa Pano Polemidion	26	7	6	13	30	53	−23	27	Qualification for the relegation round
11	Aris Limassol	26	6	6	14	30	52	−22	24	Qualification for the relegation round
12	Doxa Katokopias	26	5	5	16	20	38	−18	20	Qualification for the relegation round
13	Anagennisi Deryneia (R)	26	0	7	19	18	58	−40	7	Relegation to the Cypriot Second Division
14	AEZ Zakakiou (Note: AEZ Zakakiou were deducted six points for suspicious betting activity.) (R)	26	1	8	17	20	63	−43	5	Relegation to the Cypriot Second Division

Source: CFA (in Greek), UEFA, Soccerway
Rules for classification: 1) Points; 2) Head-to-head points; 3) Head-to-head goal difference; 4) Head-to-head goals scored; 5) Head-to-head away goals scored (only if two teams); 6) Goal difference; 7) Goals scored; 8) Play-off (only if deciding championship round, relegation round or relegation).
(R) Relegated

==== Play-offs ====
Pos	Team	Pld	W	D	L	GF	GA	GD	Pts	Qualification
1	APOEL (C)	36	24	8	4	77	24	+53	80	Qualification for the Champions League second qualifying round
2	AEK Larnaca	36	22	10	4	66	28	+38	76	Qualification for the Europa League first qualifying round
3	Apollon Limassol	36	21	10	5	71	30	+41	73	Qualification for the Europa League second qualifying round (Note: Apollon Limassol qualified for the Europa League second qualifying round by winning the 2016–17 Cypriot Cup.)
4	AEL Limassol	36	19	9	8	53	36	+17	66	Qualification for the Europa League first qualifying round
5	Omonia	36	17	6	13	68	57	+11	57	
6	Anorthosis Famagusta	36	12	11	13	48	41	+7	47	

Source: CFA (in Greek), UEFA, Soccerway
Rules for classification: 1) Points; 2) Head-to-head points; 3) Head-to-head goal difference; 4) Head-to-head goals scored; 5) Head-to-head away goals scored (only if two teams); 6) Goal difference; 7) Goals scored; 8) Play-off (only if deciding champion or UEFA competitions).
(C) Champions
Notes:

Pos	Team	Pld	W	D	L	GF	GA	GD	Pts	Relegation
7	Nea Salamis Famagusta	36	12	9	15	33	44	−11	45	
8	Ethnikos Achna	36	11	10	15	57	66	−9	43	
9	Ermis Aradippou (Note: Ermis Aradippou were deducted six points for suspicious betting activity.)	36	14	6	16	51	61	−10	42	
10	Aris Limassol	36	11	8	17	47	65	−18	41	
11	Doxa Katokopias	36	10	7	19	40	52	−12	37 (Note: Head to head record: Doxa: 6 points (GD: +2), Karmiotissa: 6 points (GD: –2))	
12	Karmiotissa Pano Polemidion (R)	36	10	7	19	47	71	−24	37	Relegation to the Cypriot Second Division

Source: CFA, UEFA, Soccerway
Rules for classification: 1) Points; 2) Head-to-head points; 3) Head-to-head goal difference; 4) Head-to-head goals scored; 5) Head-to-head away goals scored (only if two teams); 6) Goal difference; 7) Goals scored; 8) Play-off (only if deciding champion or UEFA competitions).
(R) Relegated

=== Cypriot Second Division ===
Pos	Team	Pld	W	D	L	GF	GA	GD	Pts	Qualification or relegation
1	Alki Oroklini (C, P)	26	21	3	2	60	15	+45	66	Promotion to the Cypriot First Division
2	Pafos (P)	26	17	6	3	51	24	+27	57	Promotion to the Cypriot First Division
3	Olympiakos Nicosia (P)	26	16	6	4	44	23	+21	54	Promotion to the Cypriot First Division
4	Othellos Athienou	26	15	4	7	53	33	+20	49	
5	Ayia Napa	26	13	7	6	51	29	+22	46	
6	Enosis Neon Paralimni	26	12	8	6	41	32	+9	44	
7	ENTHOI Lakatamia	26	9	6	11	32	33	−1	33	
8	ASIL Lysi	26	8	6	12	27	33	−6	30	
9	PAEEK	26	6	8	12	26	37	−11	26	
10	Omonia Aradippou	26	5	7	14	16	30	−14	22 (Note: Head-to-head record: Omonia 1–1 Ethnikos Assia, Ethnikos Assia 1–2 Omonia.)	
11	Ethnikos Assia	26	6	4	16	23	52	−29	22	
12	Akritas Chlorakas (R)	26	5	4	17	24	45	−21	19 (Note: Head-to-head record: Akritas 3–0 ENAD Polis Chrysochous, ENAD Polis Chrysochous 2–1 Akritas.)	Relegation to the Cypriot Third Division
13	ENAD Polis Chrysochous (R)	26	4	7	15	26	52	−26	19	Relegation to the Cypriot Third Division
14	Enosis Neon Parekklisia (Note: Enosis Neon Parekklisia were deducted three points.) (R)	26	4	6	16	27	64	−37	15	Relegation to the Cypriot Third Division

Source: CFA (in Greek), Soccerway
Rules for classification: 1) Points; 2) Head-to-head points; 3) Head-to-head goal difference; 4) Head-to-head goals scored; 5) Head-to-head away goals scored (only if two teams); 6) Goal difference; 7) Goals scored; 8) Play-off (only if deciding championship round, relegation round or relegation).
(C) Champions; (P) Promoted; (R) Relegated

=== Cypriot Third Division ===
Pos	Team	Pld	W	D	L	GF	GA	GD	Pts	Qualification or relegation
1	P.O. Xylotymbou (C, P)	30	22	4	4	54	22	+32	70	Promotion to the Cypriot Second Division
2	Digenis Oroklinis (P)	30	16	9	5	57	35	+22	57	Promotion to the Cypriot Second Division
3	Chalkanoras Idaliou (P)	30	16	8	6	52	39	+13	56	Promotion to the Cypriot Second Division
4	Ethnikos Latsion	30	15	9	6	59	25	+34	54	
5	Olympias Lympion	30	13	7	10	42	47	−5	46	
6	Enosi Neon Ypsona-Digenis Ipsona	30	12	7	11	42	45	−3	43	
7	Digenis Akritas Morphou	30	12	6	12	48	48	0	42	
8	Achyronas Liopetriou	30	11	6	13	38	38	0	39	
9	Peyia 2014	30	10	8	12	41	38	+3	38	
10	MEAP Nisou	30	9	9	12	34	44	−10	36	
11	Ormideia FC	30	10	5	15	30	34	−4	35 (Note: Heaf to head record: Ormideia 3–1 APEP, APEP 1–0.)	
12	APEP FC	30	8	11	11	32	40	−8	35	
13	Livadiakos/Salamina Livadion	30	9	7	14	44	48	−4	34	
14	Iraklis Gerolakkou (R)	30	8	8	14	41	48	−7	32	Relegation to the STOK Elite Division
15	Elpida Xylofagou (R)	30	8	5	17	36	54	−18	29	Relegation to the STOK Elite Division
16	AEN Ayiou Georgiou Vrysoullon-Acheritou (R)	30	5	3	22	27	71	−44	18	Relegation to the STOK Elite Division

Source: CFA
Rules for classification: 1) Points; 2) Head-to-head points; 3) Head-to-head goal difference; 4) Head-to-head goals scored; 5) Head-to-head away goals scored (only if two teams); 6) Goal difference; 7) Goals scored; 8) Play-off (only if deciding championship round, relegation round or relegation).
(C) Champions; (P) Promoted; (R) Relegated

=== STOK Elite Division ===
Pos	Team	Pld	W	D	L	GF	GA	GD	Pts	Qualification or relegation
1	Onisilos Sotira 2014 (C, P)	26	19	5	2	58	19	+39	62	Promotion to Cypriot Third Division
2	APEA Akrotiriou (P)	26	15	5	6	40	27	+13	50	Promotion to Cypriot Third Division
3	Finikas Ayias Marinas Chrysochous (P)	26	14	4	8	38	31	+7	46	Promotion to Cypriot Third Division
4	Elpida Astromeriti (P)	26	12	3	11	38	31	+7	39 (Note: Head-to-head: Elpida 7 points, Frenaros 6 points, Amathus 4 points.)	Promotion to Cypriot Third Division
5	Frenaros FC 2000	26	11	6	9	45	49	−4	39	
6	Amathus Ayiou Tychona (Note: Amathus were deducted three points as their fans stopped the home match against Elpida Astromeriti at the 79th minute, and the score was 2–0 for the away team.)	26	11	9	6	43	31	+12	39	
7	Kouris Erimis	26	11	5	10	39	37	+2	38 (Note: Head-to-head record: Kouris 1–0 Atlas, Atlas 1–1 Kouris.)	
8	Atlas Aglandjias	26	11	5	10	48	39	+9	38	
9	Doxa Paliometochou	26	11	4	11	47	45	+2	37	
10	Kornos FC 2013	26	10	6	10	44	47	−3	36 (Note: Head-to-head record: Kornos FC 2013 2–0 ASPIS, ASPIS 1–0 Kornos FC 2013.)	
11	ASPIS Pylas (R)	26	11	3	12	38	40	−2	36	Relegation to the regional leagues
12	Koloni Geroskipou FC (R)	26	7	7	12	37	43	−6	28	Relegation to the regional leagues
13	Lenas Lemesou (R)	26	3	5	18	32	62	−30	14	Relegation to the regional leagues
14	Spartakos Kitiou (R)	26	0	5	21	25	64	−39	5	Relegation to the regional leagues

Source: CFA
Rules for classification: 1) Points; 2) Head-to-head points; 3) Head-to-head goal difference; 4) Head-to-head goals scored; 5) Head-to-head away goals scored (only if two teams); 6) Goal difference; 7) Goals scored; 8) Play-off (only if deciding championship round, relegation round or relegation).
(C) Champions; (P) Promoted; (R) Relegated

=== 2018 FIFA World Cup qualifiers ===
6 September 2016	Cyprus	0–3	Belgium	GSP Stadium, Nicosia
21:45 UTC+3		Report (FIFA); Report (UEFA)	Lukaku 13', 61'; Carrasco 81'	Attendance: 12,029; Referee: Felix Zwayer (Germany)

7 October 2016	Greece	2–0	Cyprus	Karaiskakis Stadium, Athens
21:45 UTC+3	Mitroglou 12'; Mantalos 42'	Report (FIFA); Report (UEFA)		Attendance: 16,512; Referee: Pavel Královec (Czech Republic)

10 October 2016	Bosnia and Herzegovina	2–0	Cyprus	Bilino Polje Stadium, Zenica
20:45 UTC+2	Džeko 70', 81'	Report (FIFA); Report (UEFA)		Attendance: 8,900; Referee: Xavier Estrada Fernández (Spain)

13 November 2016	Cyprus	3–1	Gibraltar	GSP Stadium, Nicosia
19:00 UTC+2	Laifis 29'; Sotiriou 65'; Sielis 88'	Report (FIFA); Report (UEFA)	Casciaro 51'	Attendance: 3,151; Referee: Aliyar Aghayev (Azerbaijan)

25 March 2017	Cyprus	0–0	Estonia	GSP Stadium, Nicosia
19:00 UTC+2		Report (FIFA); Report (UEFA)		Attendance: 3,864; Referee: Ville Nevalainen (Finland)

9 June 2017	Gibraltar	1–2	Cyprus	Estádio Algarve, Faro/Loulé
19:45 UTC+1	Hernandez 30'	Report (FIFA); Report (UEFA)	R. Chipolina 10' (o.g.); Sotiriou 87'	Attendance: 488; Referee: Nikola Popov (Bulgaria)
