= 2017–18 Cypriot Cup for lower divisions =

Tournament details
- Country: Cyprus
- Dates: 25 October 2017 – 5 May 2018
- Teams: 22

Final positions
- Champions: Onisilos Sotira (1st title)
- Runners-up: Akritas Chlorakas

Tournament statistics
- Matches played: 23
- Goals scored: 80 (3.48 per match)

The 2017–18 Cypriot Cup for lower divisions was the 10th edition of the Cypriot Cup for lower divisions. A total of 22 clubs entered the competition. It began on 25 October 2017 with the first round and concluded on 5 May 2018 with the final which was held at AEK Arena. Onisilos Sotira won their 1st cup trophy after beating Akritas Chlorakas 4–2 on penalties, in the final.

== Format ==
Only teams from the Cypriot Third Division and STOK Elite Division could participate. Participation was not compulsory. 22 of 30 participated this season.

The competition consisted of five rounds. In the first, second and third round each tie was played as a single leg and was held at the home ground of one of the two teams, according to the draw results. Each tie winner was qualifying for the next round. If a match was drawn, extra time was following. If extra time was drawn, there was a replay at the ground of the team who were away for the first game. If the rematch was also drawn, then extra time was following and if the match remained drawn after extra time the winner was decided by penalty shoot-out.

The fourth round was played in a two-legged format, each team playing a home and an away match against their opponent. The team which scored more goals on aggregate was qualifying for the next round. If the two teams scored the same number of goals on aggregate, then the team which scored more goals away from home was advancing to the next round.

If both teams had scored the same number of home and away goals, then extra time was following after the end of the second leg match. If during the extra thirty minutes both teams had managed to score, but they had scored the same number of goals, then the team who scored the away goals was advancing to the next round (i.e. the team which was playing away). If there weren't scored any goals during extra time, the qualifying team was determined by penalty shoot-out.

The final will be a single match.

== First round ==
The first round draw took place on 20 October 2017 and the matches played on 25 October and 1 November 2017.

| Team 1 | Score | Team 2 |
|---|---|---|
| (C) Olympias Lympion | 4–1 | Rotsidis Mammari (D) |
| (D) Elia Lythrodonta | 5–0 | Poseidonas Giolou (D) |
| (C) Onisilos Sotira 2014 | 2–0 | ENAD Polis Chrysochous (C) |
| (C) Elpida Astromeriti | 4–2 | Kouris Erimis (D) |
| (C) MEAP Nisou | 3–1 (a.e.t.) | Achyronas Liopetriou (C) |
| (C) Digenis Morphou | 0–1 | Akritas Chlorakas (C) |

== Round of 16 ==
The round of 16 draw took place on 27 November 2017 and the matches played on 10 January 2018.

| Team 1 | Score | Team 2 |
|---|---|---|
| (C) Finikas | 2–1 (a.e.t.) | Elia Lythrodonta (D) |
| (D) Peyia 2014 | 5–0 | Doxa Paliometochou (D) |
| (C) Ethnikos Latsion | 4–0 | Elpida Xylofagou (D) |
| (C) APEP | 1–0 | Kornos (D) |
| (C) Onisilos Sotira | 2–0 | Omonia Psevda (D) |
| (C) Livadiakos/Salamina Livadion | 2–7 | Akritas Chlorakas (C) |
| (C) MEAP Nisou | 1–0 | Olympias Lympion (C) |
| (C) Ormideia | 3–0 | Elpida Astromeriti (C) |

== Quarter-finals ==
The quarter-finals draw took place on 26 January 2018 and the matches played on 14 February 2018.

| Team 1 | Score | Team 2 |
|---|---|---|
| (C) Akritas Chlorakas | 1–0 | Ormideia (C) |
| (C) Ethnikos Latsion | 2–1 | Peyia 2014 (C) |
| (C) APEP | 1–2 | MEAP Nisou (C) |
| (C) Finikas | 2–4 | Onisilos Sotira (C) |

== Semi-finals ==
The semi-finals draw took place on 28 February 2017 and the matches played on 14 and 21 March 2018.

| Team 1 | Agg. | Team 2 | 1st leg | 2nd leg |
|---|---|---|---|---|
| (C) Akritas Chlorakas | 2–1 | MEAP Nisou (C) | 2–1 | 0–0 |
| (C) Ethnikos Latsion | 4–5 | Onisilos Sotira (C) | 2–4 | 2–1 |

== Final ==
5 May 2018
17:00 EEST

| Akritas Chlorakas | 2–2 (a.e.t.) | Onisilos Sotira |
|---|---|---|
| Panagides 64'; Filippou 67' | Report | Mavroudes 45'; Papathanasiou 49' (pen.) |
Penalties
| | 2–4 |

AEK Arena, Larnaca
Attendance: 789
Referee: Alexis Prokopiou

| Akritas | Onisilos |
