= 2020–21 Cypriot Second Division =

Cypriot Second Division
- Season: 2020-21
- Dates: 11 September 2020 – 15 May 2021
- Champions: PAEEK (1st title)
- Runner up: Aris Limassol
- Promoted: PAEEK; Aris Limassol
- Relegated: Kouris Erimis; Digenis Akritas Morphou; AEZ Zakakiou; Omonia Psevda; THOI Lakatamia; Krasava ENY
- Matches: 306
- Goals: 842 (2.75 per match)
- Top goalscorer: Marcos Michael (25 goals)
- Biggest home win: Alki Oroklini 6-0 Omonia Psevda (24 April 2021)
- Biggest away win: Krasava ENY 0-6 PAEEK (24 April 2021)
- Highest scoring: Omonia Aradippou 4-5 Achyronas Liopetriou (17 April 2021)
- Longest winning run: Othellos Athienou (7 matches)
- Longest unbeaten run: PAEEK (16 matches)
- Longest losing run: Omonia Psevda (8 matches)

The 2020–21 Cypriot Second Division was the 66th season of the Cypriot second-level football league. The campaign started on the 11th of September 2020 and concluded on the 15th of May 2021.

== Teams ==
The league consisted of eighteen teams; fourteen teams remaining from the previous season, four teams promoted from the Cypriot Third Division, and no teams were relegated from the Cypriot First Division.

Teams promoted to 2020–21 Cypriot First Division

- Ermis Aradippou
- Karmiotissa

Teams promoted from 2019–20 Cypriot Third Division

- Achyronas Liopetriou
- PAEEK
- Kouris Erimis
- THOI Lakatamia

Note: Table lists clubs in alphabetical order.

Club	Location
Achyronas Liopetriou	Liopetri
AEZ Zakakiou	Zakaki
Akritas Chlorakas	Chlorakas
Alki Oroklini	Oroklini
Anagennisi Deryneia	Deryneia
Aris Limassol	Limassol
ASIL	Larnaca
Ayia Napa	Ayia Napa
Digenis Akritas Morphou	Morphou
Kouris Erimis	Erimi
Krasava ENY	Ypsonas
Omonia Aradippou	Aradippou
Omonia Psevda	Psevdas
Onisilos Sotira	Sotira
Othellos Athienou	Athienou
PAEEK	Lakatamia
P.O. Xylotymbou	Xylotymbou
THOI Lakatamia	Lakatamia

== Season ==
During the season, each team faced each other twice, home and away.

=== League table ===
Pos	Team	Pld	W	D	L	GF	GA	GD	Pts	Result
1	PAEEK (C, P)	34	21	7	6	68	28	+40	70	Promotion to the Cypriot First Division
2	Aris Limassol (P)	34	21	10	3	50	22	+28	70	Promotion to the Cypriot First Division
3	Othellos Athienou	34	20	9	5	55	32	+23	69	
4	Ayia Napa	34	16	12	6	51	36	+15	60	
5	Alki Oroklini	34	13	14	7	56	38	+18	53	
6	Omonia Aradippou	34	15	6	13	55	49	+6	51	
7	Onisilos Sotira	34	13	12	9	61	51	+10	48	
8	ASIL	34	13	7	14	34	34	0	46	
9	Achyronas Liopetriou	34	12	9	13	43	43	0	45	
10	Anagennisi Deryneia	34	12	8	14	50	50	0	44	
11	Akritas Chlorakas	34	11	10	13	41	47	−6	43	
12	P.O. Xylotymbou	34	10	11	13	42	45	−3	41	
13	Kouris Erimis (R)	34	10	9	15	50	56	−6	39	Relegation to the Cypriot Third Division
14	Digenis Akritas Morphou (R)	34	9	10	15	43	53	−10	37	Relegation to the Cypriot Third Division
15	AEZ Zakakiou (R)	34	8	10	16	32	51	−19	34	Relegation to the Cypriot Third Division
16	Omonia Psevda (R)	34	9	7	18	44	62	−18	28	Relegation to the Cypriot Third Division
17	THOI Lakatamia (R)	34	5	8	21	35	68	−33	20	Relegation to the Cypriot Third Division
18	Krasava ENY (R)	34	5	7	22	32	77	−45	19	Relegation to the Cypriot Third Division

Source: CFA
Rules for classification: 1) Points; 2) Head-to-head points; 3) Head-to-head goal difference; 4) Head-to-head goals scored; 5) Head-to-head away goals scored (only if two teams); 6) Goal difference; 7) Goals scored; 8) Play-off (only if deciding championship round, relegation round or relegation).
(C) Champions; (P) Promoted; (R) Relegated

Notes:

- Aris Limassol has been deducted 3 points.
- THOI Lakatamia has been deducted 3 points.
- Krasava ENY has been deducted 3 points.
- Onisilos Sotira has been deducted 3 points.
- Omonia Psevda has been deducted 6 points.
