= 2019–20 Cypriot Second Division =

Cypriot Second Division
- Season: 2019–20
- Dates: 20 September 2019 – 7 March 2020
- Promoted: Karmiotissa; Ermis Aradippou
- Matches: 115
- Goals: 319 (2.77 per match)
- Top goalscorer: Andreas Kyprianou; Andreas Papathanasiou (10 goals)
- Biggest home win: Alki 9–0 Omonia Psevda (2 November 2019)
- Biggest away win: Ypsonas 0–5 Ayia Napa (8 December 2019)
- Highest scoring: Alki 9–0 Omonia Psevda (2 November 2019)
- Longest unbeaten run: Ermis Aradippou (16 games)
- All statistics correct as of 14 February 2020.

The 2019–20 Cypriot Second Division is the 65th season of the Cypriot second-level football league. It began on 20 September 2019 and ended in March 2020 due to the Covid-19 pandemic.

== Format ==
Sixteen teams are divided into 2 groups of 8 teams each (Groups A and B). Each plays the others from its own group twice, home and away, for a total of 14 games each, over 14 game weeks. Teams in places 1-4 of each group qualify for Premier Group where the first two teams were promoted to the First Division, and the rest for Standard Group where the last four teams would be relegated to the Third Division - however due to the pandemic, no teams were relegated this season.

== Team changes from 2018–19 ==
Teams promoted to 2019–20 Cypriot First Division

- Ethnikos Achna
- Olympiakos Nicosia

Teams relegated from 2018–19 Cypriot First Division

- Alki Oroklini
- Ermis Aradippou

Teams promoted from 2018–19 Cypriot Third Division

- Digenis Morphou
- Omonia Psevda
- Ypsonas FC
- P.O. Xylotymbou

Teams relegated to 2019–20 Cypriot Third Division

- THOI Lakatamia
- MEAP Nisou
- PAEEK
- Digenis Oroklinis

== Stadiums and locations ==
Location of clubs in 2019–20 Cypriot Second Division

Note: Table lists clubs in alphabetical order.

Club	Location	Venue	Capacity
AEZ	Zakaki, Limassol	Zakaki Community Stadium	2,000
Akritas	Chloraka, Paphos	Chloraka Municipal Stadium	3,500
Alki	Oroklini, Larnaca	Ammochostos Stadium, Larnaca	5,500
Anagennisi	Deryneia, Famagusta	Anagennisi Football Ground	5,800
Aris	Limassol	Tsirio Stadium	13,331
ASIL	Larnaca	Grigoris Afxentiou Stadium	2,000
Ayia Napa	Ayia Napa, Famagusta	Ayia Napa Municipal Stadium	2,000
Digenis Akritas Morphou	Morphou, Nicosia	Makario Stadium, Nicosia	16,000
Ermis Aradippou	Aradippou, Larnaca	Aradippou Municipal Stadium	2,500
Karmiotissa	Pano Polemidia, Limassol	Pano Polemidia Municipal Stadium	1,500
Omonia Ar.	Aradippou, Larnaca	Aradippou Municipal Stadium	2,500
Omonia Psevda	Psevdas, Larnaca	Psevdas Municipal Stadium	1,000
Onisilos	Sotira, Famagusta	Sotira Municipal Stadium	1,000
Othellos	Athienou, Larnaca	Othellos Athienou Stadium	5,000
P.O. Xylotymbou	Xylotymbou, Larnaca	Xylotymbou Municipal Stadium	1,000
Ypsonas FC	Ypsonas, Limassol	Stelios Chari Stadium	1,000

== First phase ==
=== Group A ===
==== Standings ====
Pos	Team	Pld	W	D	L	GF	GA	GD	Pts	Qualification
1	Aris Limassol	14	9	3	2	24	10	+14	30 (Note: Head to head record: Aris 3–0 Karmiotissa, Karmiotissa 1–0 Aris.)	Qualification to Premier Group
2	Karmiotissa	14	10	0	4	25	16	+9	30	Qualification to Premier Group
3	Ayia Napa	14	8	3	3	20	12	+8	27 (Note: Head to head record: Ayia Napa 0–0 ASIL, ASIL 1–2 Ayia Napa.)	Qualification to Premier Group
4	ASIL Lysi	14	8	3	3	24	14	+10	27	Qualification to Premier Group
5	Alki Oroklini	14	4	3	7	19	14	+5	15	Qualification to Standard Group
6	Omonia Aradippou	14	3	4	7	9	14	−5	13	Qualification to Standard Group
7	Ypsonas FC	14	3	3	8	9	21	−12	12	Qualification to Standard Group
8	Omonia Psevda	14	2	1	11	12	41	−29	7	Qualification to Standard Group

Source: CFA (in Greek)
Rules for classification: 1) Points; 2) Head-to-head points; 3) Head-to-head goal difference; 4) Head-to-head goals scored; 5) Head-to-head away goals scored (only if two teams); 6) Goal difference; 7) Goals scored; 8) Play-off (only if deciding championship round, relegation round or relegation).

==== Results ====
Home \ Away	ALK	ARI	ASL	AYN	KAR	OMA	OMP	YPS
Alki Oroklini		1–0	1–1	1–2	1–2	0–1	9–0	2–0
Aris Limassol	1–0		2–1	0–0	3–0	1–0	6–0	1–0
ASIL Lysi	2–1	4–3		1–2	4–1	3–0	2–1	2–0
Ayia Napa	1–0	1–0	0–0		1–2	1–0	1–2	2–2
Karmiotissa	2–0	1–0	1–2	2–0		1–0	6–1	3–1
Omonia Aradippou	0–0	1–3	0–0	1–2	0–1		3–1	2–0
Omonia Psevda	2–3	0–2	0–1	1–2	3–2	1–1		0–2
Ypsonas FC	0–0	1–2	2–1	0–5	0–1	0–0	1–0	

Source: CFA
Legend: Blue = home team win; Yellow = draw; Red = away team win.

=== Group B ===
==== Standings ====
Pos	Team	Pld	W	D	L	GF	GA	GD	Pts	Qualification
1	Ermis Aradippou	14	12	2	0	31	8	+23	38	Qualification to Premier Group
2	Onisilos Sotira 2014	14	7	5	2	24	14	+10	26	Qualification to Premier Group
3	Othellos Athienou	14	6	2	6	21	17	+4	20	Qualification to Premier Group
4	Anagennisi Deryneia	14	4	3	7	12	13	−1	15 (Note: Head to head points: Anagennisi: 7, Digenis: 5, Akritas: 4.)	Qualification to Premier Group
5	Digenis Akritas Morphou (Note: Digenis Akritas Morphou were deducted three points for suspicious betting activity.)	14	5	3	6	18	20	−2	15	Qualification to Standard Group
6	Akritas Chlorakas	14	3	6	5	19	26	−7	15	Qualification to Standard Group
7	P.O. Xylotymbou 2006	14	3	4	7	14	22	−8	13	Qualification to Standard Group
8	AEZ Zakakiou	14	2	3	9	11	30	−19	9	Qualification to Standard Group

Source: CFA (in Greek)
Rules for classification: 1) Points; 2) Head-to-head points; 3) Head-to-head goal difference; 4) Head-to-head goals scored; 5) Head-to-head away goals scored (only if two teams); 6) Goal difference; 7) Goals scored; 8) Play-off (only if deciding championship round, relegation round or relegation).

==== Results ====
Home \ Away	AEZ	AKR	ANA	DMO	ERM	ONI	OTH	POX
AEZ Zakakiou		1–1	1–0	0–4	1–3	2–2	0–1	1–1
Akritas Chlorakas	3–1		2–0	2–2	2–2	2–2	0–3	2–2
Anagennisi Deryneia	0–1	2–0		1–1	0–1	0–0	2–0	2–0
Digenis Akritas Morphou	1–0	1–0	0–2		0–1	0–2	2–2	2–1
Ermis Aradippou	3–1	4–0	2–0	4–2		3–0	1–0	2–0
Onisilos Sotira 2014	4–1	4–2	2–1	2–0	1–1		1–0	3–0
Othellos Athienou	4–1	1–2	1–1	0–2	1–3	2–1		4–1
P.O. Xylotymbou 2006	3–0	1–1	2–1	3–1	0–1	0–0	0–2	

Source: CFA
Legend: Blue = home team win; Yellow = draw; Red = away team win.

== Second phase ==
=== Premier Group ===
==== Standings ====
Pos	Team	Pld	W	D	L	GF	GA	GD	Pts	Qualification
1	Karmiotissa (P)	20	15	0	5	40	23	+17	30	Promotion to Cypriot First Division
2	Ermis Aradippou (P)	20	15	3	2	40	16	+24	29	Promotion to Cypriot First Division
3	Aris Limassol	20	13	2	5	31	14	+17	27	
4	Ayia Napa	20	11	5	4	24	14	+10	25	
5	Onisilos Sotira 2014	20	9	6	5	30	22	+8	20	
6	ASIL Lysi	20	9	5	6	27	19	+8	19	
7	Othellos Athienou	20	7	3	10	28	30	−2	14	
8	Anagennisi Deryneia	20	5	3	12	20	25	−5	11	

Source: CFA (in Greek)
Rules for classification: 1) Points; 2) Head-to-head points; 3) Head-to-head goal difference; 4) Head-to-head goals scored; 5) Head-to-head away goals scored (only if two teams); 6) Goal difference; 7) Goals scored; 8) Play-off (only if deciding championship round, relegation round or relegation).
(P) Promoted

==== Results ====
Home \ Away	ANA	ARI	ASL	AYN	ERM	KAR	ONI	OTH
Anagennisi Deryneia					0–1		0–2	5–1
Aris Limassol	4–2			0–0	1–0			1–0
ASIL Lysi		0–1			0–1			1–0
Ayia Napa	1–0		0–0			2–1	0–1	
Ermis Aradippou						2–3	1–0	
Karmiotissa	3–1	2–0	2–1				4–1	
Onisilos Sotira 2014			1–1					1–2
Othellos Athienou				0–1	4–4			

Updated to match(es) played on 7 March 2020. Source: CFA
Legend: Blue = home team win; Yellow = draw; Red = away team win.

=== Standard Group ===
==== Standings ====
Pos	Team	Pld	W	D	L	GF	GA	GD	Pts
1	Alki Oroklini	20	8	3	9	31	19	+12	20
2	P.O. Xylotymbou 2006	20	6	6	8	22	28	−6	18
3	Omonia Aradippou	20	6	6	8	18	20	−2	18
4	Digenis Akritas Morphou	20	8	3	9	24	27	−3	17
5	AEZ Zakakiou	20	5	6	9	16	31	−15	17
6	Akritas Chlorakas	20	5	7	8	25	33	−8	15
7	Ypsonas FC	20	4	5	11	14	32	−18	11
8	Omonia Psevda	20	2	1	17	18	55	−37	4

Updated to match(es) played on 8 March 2020. Source: CFA (in Greek)
Rules for classification: 1) Points; 2) Head-to-head points; 3) Head-to-head goal difference; 4) Head-to-head goals scored; 5) Head-to-head away goals scored (only if two teams); 6) Goal difference; 7) Goals scored; 8) Play-off (only if deciding championship round, relegation round or relegation).

==== Results ====
Home \ Away	AEZ	AKR	ALK	DMO	OMA	OMP	POX	YPS
AEZ Zakakiou		1–0		2–0			1–1	
Akritas Chlorakas						2–1	3–1	
Alki Oroklini	0–1	2–1			1–0	3–0		
Digenis Akritas Morphou		2–0	2–1					
Omonia Aradippou	0–0			1–0			1–1	4–2
Omonia Psevda				1–2	2–3		1–2	
P.O. Xylotymbou 2006				2–0				1–0
Ypsonas FC	0–0	0–0	1–5			2–1		

Updated to match(es) played on 8 March 2020. Source: CFA
Legend: Blue = home team win; Yellow = draw; Red = away team win.
