= 2017–18 Cypriot Third Division =

Cypriot Third Division
- Season: 2017–18
- Champions: Onisilos (1st title)
- Promoted: Onisilos; MEAP Nisou; Akritas
- Relegated: APEP; Finikas; Livadiakos
- Matches played: 240
- Goals scored: 702 (2.93 per match)
- Top goalscorer: Andreas Papathanasiou (22 goals)
- All statistics correct as of 29 April 2018.

The 2017–18 Cypriot Third Division is the 47th season of the Cypriot third-level football league.

== Format ==
Sixteen teams participated in the 2017–18 Cypriot Third Division. All teams will play against each other twice, once at their home and once away. The team with the most points at the end of the season crowned champions. The first three teams were promoted to the 2017–18 Cypriot Second Division and the last three teams were relegated to the 2017–18 STOK Elite Division.

=== Point system ===
Teams received three points for a win, one point for a draw and zero points for a loss.

== Changes from previous season ==
Teams promoted to 2017–18 Cypriot Second Division

- P.O. Xylotymbou
- Digenis Oroklinis
- Chalkanoras

Teams relegated from 2016–17 Cypriot Second Division

- Akritas
- ENAD
- Parekklisia

Teams promoted from 2016–17 STOK Elite Division

- Onisilos Sotira 2014
- APEA Akrotiriou
- Finikas
- Elpida Astromeriti

Teams relegated to 2017–18 STOK Elite Division

- Iraklis Gerolakkou
- Elpida Xylofagou
- AEN

== Stadia and locations ==
Locations of the 2017–18 Cypriot Third Division teams.

| Club | Venue |
|---|---|
| Achyronas | Liopetri Municipal Stadium |
| Akritas Chlorakas | Chloraka Municipal Stadium |
| APEA Akrotiriou | Akrotiri Community Stadium |
| APEP | Kyperounda Municipal Stadium |
| Digenis Akritas Morphou | Makario Stadium |
| Elpida Astromeriti | Katokopia Municipal Stadium |
| ENAD | Polis Chrysochous Municipal Stadium |
| ENY-Digenis | Stelios Chari Stadium |
| Ethnikos L. | Latsia Municipal Stadium |
| Finikas Ayias Marinas Chrysochous | Euripides Municipal Stadium |
| Livadiakos/Salamina Livadion | Ayia Pasaskevi Livadion Municipality Stadium |
| MEAP | Theodorio Koinotiko |
| Olympias Lympion | Olympias Lympion Stadium |
| Onisilos Sotira | Sotira Municipal Stadium |
| Ormideia FC | Ormideia Municipal Stadium |
| Peyia 2014 | Peyia Municipal Stadium |

== League standings ==
| Pos | Team | Pld | W | D | L | GF | GA | GD | Pts | Qualification or relegation |
|---|---|---|---|---|---|---|---|---|---|---|
| 1 | Onisilos Sotira 2014 (C, P) | 30 | 21 | 5 | 4 | 60 | 22 | +38 | 68 | Promotion to the Cypriot Second Division |
| 2 | MEAP Nisou (P) | 30 | 19 | 6 | 5 | 67 | 31 | +36 | 63 | Promotion to the Cypriot Second Division |
| 3 | Akritas Chlorakas (P) | 30 | 17 | 7 | 6 | 44 | 22 | +22 | 58 | Promotion to the Cypriot Second Division |
| 4 | Enosi Neon Ypsona-Digenis Ipsona | 30 | 14 | 6 | 10 | 61 | 45 | +16 | 48 | |
| 5 | ENAD Polis Chrysochous | 30 | 13 | 8 | 9 | 47 | 35 | +12 | 47 | |
| 6 | Elpida Astromeriti | 30 | 13 | 7 | 10 | 44 | 36 | +8 | 46 | |
| 7 | Peyia 2014 | 30 | 13 | 6 | 11 | 41 | 48 | −7 | 45 | |
| 8 | APEA Akrotiriou | 30 | 12 | 5 | 13 | 35 | 39 | −4 | 41 | |
| 9 | Achyronas Liopetriou | 30 | 10 | 8 | 12 | 41 | 47 | −6 | 38 (Note: Head to head record: Achyronas 2–1 Ormideia, Ormideia 0–0 Achyronas.) | |
| 10 | Ormideia FC | 30 | 10 | 8 | 12 | 33 | 35 | −2 | 38 | |
| 11 | Ethnikos Latsion | 30 | 10 | 7 | 13 | 45 | 55 | −10 | 37 | |
| 12 | Digenis Akritas Morphou | 30 | 8 | 12 | 10 | 45 | 47 | −2 | 36 | |
| 13 | Olympias Lympion | 30 | 11 | 2 | 17 | 45 | 60 | −15 | 35 | |
| 14 | APEP FC (R) | 30 | 9 | 5 | 16 | 36 | 46 | −10 | 32 | Relegation to the STOK Elite Division |
| 15 | Finikas Ayias Marinas Chrysochous (R) | 30 | 4 | 8 | 18 | 23 | 51 | −28 | 20 | Relegation to the STOK Elite Division |
| 16 | Livadiakos/Salamina Livadion (Note: Livadiakos/Salamina Livadion were deducted three points for financial reasons.) (R) | 30 | 3 | 6 | 21 | 35 | 73 | −38 | 12 | Relegation to the STOK Elite Division |

Source: CFA
Rules for classification: 1) Points; 2) Head-to-head points; 3) Head-to-head goal difference; 4) Head-to-head goals scored; 5) Head-to-head away goals scored (only if two teams); 6) Goal difference; 7) Goals scored; 8) Play-off (only if deciding championship round, relegation round or relegation).
(C) Champions; (P) Promoted; (R) Relegated

== Results ==
| Home \ Away | ACH | AKR | APEA | APEP | DMO | ELP | ENAD | ENY | ETH | FIN | LSL | MEAP | OLY | ONI | OFC | PEY |
|---|---|---|---|---|---|---|---|---|---|---|---|---|---|---|---|---|
| Achyronas Liopetriou | — | 2–1 | 0–0 | 0–0 | 2–1 | 2–1 | 1–1 | 1–4 | 2–1 | 5–0 | 6–3 | 2–6 | 2–1 | 0–1 | 2–1 | 2–2 |
| Akritas Chlorakas | 1–0 | — | 1–0 | 3–1 | 1–1 | 1–0 | 2–0 | 5–4 | 1–0 | 0–0 | 2–1 | 3–0 | 4–0 | 1–1 | 2–0 | 2–0 |
| APEA Akrotiriou | 4–3 | 0–2 | — | 1–0 | 0–3 | 1–1 | 1–2 | 1–5 | 3–2 | 4–0 | 1–1 | 3–2 | 4–1 | 0–1 | 0–1 | 0–2 |
| APEP | 1–0 | 0–3 | 0–1 | — | 2–0 | 1–2 | 1–1 | 1–0 | 1–1 | 3–0 | 3–0 | 0–2 | 2–0 | 2–1 | 0–1 | 1–2 |
| Digenis Akritas Morphou | 0–0 | 1–1 | 0–0 | 3–3 | — | 0–0 | 3–1 | 4–1 | 0–4 | 2–1 | 4–4 | 1–2 | 3–0 | 2–2 | 2–0 | 0–0 |
| Elpida Astromeriti | 0–0 | 0–0 | 1–3 | 3–1 | 2–0 | — | 2–1 | 2–1 | 7–2 | 2–0 | 2–2 | 0–1 | 3–2 | 0–3 | 1–2 | 1–0 |
| ENAD Polis Chrysochous | 3–1 | 2–0 | 0–1 | 2–0 | 3–0 | 1–0 | — | 0–2 | 2–2 | 1–1 | 2–0 | 3–1 | 4–1 | 0–1 | 1–1 | 2–0 |
| ENY-Digenis | 2–0 | 2–1 | 0–1 | 2–0 | 3–1 | 1–1 | 2–2 | — | 2–0 | 1–0 | 5–1 | 0–0 | 0–0 | 2–2 | 3–0 | 6–2 |
| Ethnikos Latsion | 2–3 | 2–1 | 1–0 | 0–1 | 3–3 | 2–2 | 0–0 | 3–2 | — | 2–1 | 3–0 | 1–1 | 2–0 | 1–2 | 0–1 | 3–2 |
| Finikas Ayias Marinas Chrysochous | 2–2 | 0–1 | 2–0 | 2–1 | 2–4 | 0–1 | 1–1 | 2–1 | 1–2 | — | 1–1 | 2–0 | 1–2 | 0–1 | 0–0 | 1–1 |
| Livadiakos/Salamina Livadion | 0–2 | 1–0 | 0–1 | 1–2 | 0–2 | 0–5 | 0–5 | 3–4 | 4–0 | 1–1 | — | 2–3 | 2–3 | 2–5 | 1–3 | 1–1 |
| MEAP Nisou | 1–0 | 0–0 | 2–1 | 5–2 | 2–2 | 4–0 | 2–0 | 4–1 | 1–1 | 3–1 | 7–1 | — | 3–1 | 0–0 | 3–2 | 3–0 |
| Olympias Lympion | 2–0 | 1–4 | 3–1 | 3–2 | 3–1 | 1–4 | 2–3 | 3–1 | 5–1 | 2–1 | 0–2 | 0–1 | — | 2–1 | 4–0 | 1–2 |
| Onisilos Sotira | 2–0 | 3–0 | 1–0 | 2–1 | 3–1 | 1–0 | 0–1 | 3–0 | 4–2 | 5–0 | 5–0 | 1–0 | 4–1 | — | 2–0 | 0–2 |
| Ormideia FC | 0–0 | 0–0 | 1–1 | 0–0 | 1–1 | 3–0 | 4–1 | 1–3 | 1–2 | 1–0 | 1–0 | 1–2 | 1–1 | 1–2 | — | 5–0 |
| Peyia 2014 | 4–1 | 0–1 | 1–2 | 5–4 | 1–0 | 0–1 | 3–2 | 1–1 | 2–0 | 1–0 | 4–1 | 0–6 | 1–0 | 1–1 | 1–0 | — |

Source: Cyprus Football Association
Legend: Blue = home team win; Yellow = draw; Red = away team win.
For upcoming matches, an "a" indicates there is an article about the rivalry between the two participants.

== Sources ==
- "League standings" (in Greek). Cyprus Football Association. Archived from the original on 2018-03-23.
- "Results" (in Greek). Cyprus Football Association. Archived from the original on 2018-03-23.
- "Teams" (in Greek). Cyprus Football Association. Archived from the original on 2018-03-23.
- "Scorers" (in Greek). Cyprus Football Association. Archived from the original on April 30, 2018.

== See also ==
- Cypriot Third Division
- 2017–18 Cypriot First Division
- 2017–18 Cypriot Second Division
- 2017–18 Cypriot Cup for lower divisions
