= STOK Elite Division =

Football 4th tier on Cyprus

- Organising body: Cyprus Football Association
- Founded: 2015; 11 years ago
- Country: Cyprus
- Confederation: UEFA
- Number of clubs: 16
- Level on pyramid: 4
- Promotion to: Cypriot Third Division
- Relegation to: Cypriot regional levels
- Domestic cup: Cypriot Cup for lower divisions
- Current champions: Alki Larnaca (2025–26)
- Website: https://www.cfa.com.cy/
- Current: 2026–27 STOK Elite Division

The STOK Elite Division is the fourth tier and the last professional football league competition in Cyprus, run by the STOK Federation of the Cypriot levels.

== History ==
The STOK Elite Division Championship was initiated by the Cyprus Football Association and by STOK in the 2015–16 football season as the fourth level of Cypriot football in order to replace the folded Cypriot Fourth Division.

== Format ==
=== Current format ===
Sixteen clubs are competing in the league, playing each other twice, once at home and once away, for a total of 30 games per team. The top three clubs are promoted to the Cypriot Third Division and the bottom four are relegated to Cypriot regional levels.

== Teams ==
The sixteen teams participating in the 2026–27 season are:

- AEK Korakou
- AEK Kouklia
- AE Troullon
- Akamas Peyia FC
- APONA Anagyias
- APOP Polis Chrysochous
- Atlas Aglandjias
- Dias Strovolou
- Frenaros FC
- Geroskipou
- Kouris Erimis
- Orfeas Nicosia
- Thiella Agiou Theodorou
- Thoi Pyrgou
- Proodos Kaimakliou
- Rotsidis Mammari

== Winners ==
The table presents all the winners since the 2015-16 season, when the competition officially began.

Season	Winner
2015–16	Livadiakos/Salamina Livadion
2016–17	Onisilos Sotira
2017–18	Kouris Erimis
2018–19	Iraklis Gerolakkou
2019–20	Interrupted
2020–21	Interrupted
2021–22	APEA Akrotiriou
2022–23	Geroskipou FC
2023–24	Doxa Paliometochou
2024–25	AEN Vrysoullon-Acheritou
2025–26	Alki Larnaca

=== Performance by club ===
Club	Winners	Winning seasons
Livadiakos/Salamina Livadion	1	2015–16
Onisilos Sotira 2014	1	2016–17
Kouris Erimis	1	2017–18
Iraklis Gerolakkou	1	2018–19
APEA Akrotiriou	1	2021–22
Geroskipou FC	1	2022–23
Doxa Paliometochou	1	2023–24
AEN Vrysoullon-Acheritou	1	2024–25
Alki Larnaca	1	2025–26

== Appearances in the STOK Elite division ==
The below table indicates the total number of seasons each club has participated in the Cypriot STOK Elite Division since 2015-16 up to and including the 2026-27 season.

60 teams have played at least one season in the Cypriot STOK Elite Division.

Teams in bold are participating in the 2026–27 STOK Elite Division.

Team	Participations
**Orfeas Nicosia**	10
**AEK Korakou**	9
AEN	9
**Atlas Aglandjias**	9
Kornos FC	9
Doxa Paliometochou	9
**Geroskipou FC**	7
Finikas	7
**AE Troullon**	6
ASPIS Pylas	6
APEA Akrotiriou	5
**APONA Anageias**	5
**AO Thiella Agiou Theodorou**	5
**Frenaros FC**	5
Adonis Idaliou	4
AO Avgorou	4
APEP FC	4
**Proodos Kaimakliou**	4
AEP Polemidion	3
Amathus	3

Team	Participations
Elia Lythrodonta	3
Elpida Astromeriti	3
Ethnikos Latsion	3
Kedros	3
**Kouris Erimis**	3
**Rotsidis Mammari**	3
Spartakos Kitiou	3
**AEK Kouklia**	2
**Akamas Peyia FC 2025**	2
Anorthosis Mouttagiakas	2
**APOP Polis**	2
I Akanthou	2
Iraklis Gerolakkou	2
Kormakitis	2
Livadiakos/Salamina Livadion	2
Lenas Limassol	2
Olympias Lympion	2
Olympos Xylofagou	2
Omonia Psevda	2
Onisilos Sotira	2

Team	Participations
Peyia 2014	2
Thoi/AEK Leivadion	2
**Thoi Pirgou**	2
Xilofagou FC	2
AEK Kellion	1
Alki Larnaca	1
Anagennisi Lythrodonta	1
Apollon Geriou	1
Dias Strovolou	1
Dinamo Pervolion	1
Elpida Liopetriou	1
Elpida Xylofagou	1
ENAD Polis Chrysochous	1
Enosis Kokkinotrimithia	1
Ethnikos Assia	1
Leivadia FC 2022	1
PAC Omonia 29M	1
PAOK Klirou	1
Poseidonas Giolou	1
THOI Lakatamia	1

Notes:

- Reference data is up until 2022/23, but the table above is until 2026/27
