= 2017–18 STOK Elite Division =

STOK Elite Division
- Season: 2017–18
- Champions: Kouris Erimis (1st title)
- Promoted: Kouris Erimis; Omonia Psevda; Amathus
- Relegated: Elpida Xylofagou; Frenaros FC 2000; Kornos FC 2013; Poseidonas Giolou
- Matches played: 182
- Goals scored: 554 (3.04 per match)
- Top goalscorer: Andreas Ioannou (30 goals)
- All statistics correct as of 24 March 2018.

The 2017–18 STOK Elite Division is the 3rd season of the Cypriot fourth-level football league.

== Format ==
Fourteen teams participated in the 2017–18 STOK Elite Division. All teams played against each other twice, once at their home and once away. The team with the most points at the end of the season crowned champions. The first three teams were promoted to the 2017–18 Cypriot Third Division and the last two teams were relegated to the regional leagues.

=== Point system ===
Teams received three points for a win, one point for a draw and zero points for a loss.

== Changes from previous season ==
Teams promoted to 2017–18 Cypriot Third Division

- Onisilos Sotira 2014
- APEA Akrotiriou
- Finikas
- Elpida Astromeriti

Teams relegated from 2016–17 Cypriot Third Division

- Iraklis Gerolakkou
- Elpida Xylofagou
- AEN Ayiou Georgiou Vrysoullon-Acheritou

Teams promoted from regional leagues

- Omonia Psevda
- Elia Lythrodonta
- Poseidonas Giolou
- Rotsidis Mammari

Teams relegated to regional leagues

- ASPIS Pylas
- Koloni Geroskipou FC
- Lenas Limassol
- Spartakos Kitiou

== Stadiums and locations ==
Locations of the 2017–18 STOK Elite Division teams.

Club	Venue
AEN	Olympos Acheritou Stadium
Amathus	Ayios Tychonas Municipal Stadium
Atlas Aglandjias	Aglandjia Municipal Stadium
Doxa	Doxa Paliometochou Stadium
Elia	Elia Lythrodonta Stadium
Elpida	Michalonikion Stadium
Frenaros FC	Frenaros Municipal Stadium
Iraklis	THOI Lakatamia Stadium
Kornos FC	Kornos Municipal Stadium
Kouris Erimis	Erimi Municipal Stadium
Omonia Psevda	Kornos Municipal Stadium
Orfeas	Orfeas Stadium
Poseidonas Giolou	Polis Chrysochous Municipal Stadium
Rotsidis	Kokkinotrimithia Municipal Stadium

== League standings ==
Pos	Team	Pld	W	D	L	GF	GA	GD	Pts	Qualification or relegation
1	Kouris Erimis (C, P)	26	17	6	3	69	27	+42	57	Promotion to Cypriot Third Division
2	Omonia Psevda (P)	26	16	8	2	54	22	+32	56	Promotion to Cypriot Third Division
3	Amathus Ayiou Tychona (P)	26	15	6	5	53	24	+29	51	Promotion to Cypriot Third Division
4	Iraklis Gerolakkou	26	11	5	10	47	57	−10	38	
5	Doxa Paliometochou	26	10	7	9	35	23	+12	37	
6	Rotsidis Mammari	26	10	6	10	47	35	+12	36	
7	Atlas Aglandjias	26	10	4	12	42	42	0	34 (Note: Head to head record: Atlas 1–0 Elia, Elia 2–1 Atlas.)	
8	Elia Lythrodonta	26	10	4	12	34	41	−7	34	
9	AEN Ayiou Georgiou Vrysoullon-Acheritou	26	9	6	11	36	40	−4	33 (Note: Head to head record: AEN 2–1 Orfeas, Orfeas 3–3 AEN.)	
10	Orfeas Nicosia	26	9	6	11	36	40	−4	33	
11	Elpida Xylofagou (R)	26	8	6	12	26	32	−6	30	Relegation to the regional leagues
12	Frenaros FC 2000 (R)	26	7	8	11	26	35	−9	29	Relegation to the regional leagues
13	Kornos FC 2013 (R)	26	6	9	11	34	43	−9	27	Relegation to the regional leagues
14	Poseidonas Giolou (R)	26	1	5	20	15	93	−78	8	Relegation to the regional leagues

Source: CFA
Rules for classification: 1) Points; 2) Head-to-head points; 3) Head-to-head goal difference; 4) Head-to-head goals scored; 5) Head-to-head away goals scored (only if two teams); 6) Goal difference; 7) Goals scored; 8) Play-off (only if deciding championship round, relegation round or relegation).
(C) Champions; (P) Promoted; (R) Relegated

== Results ==
Home \ Away	AEN	AMA	ATL	DOX	ELI	ELP	FRE	IRA	KOR	KOU	OMO	ORF	POS	ROT
AEN	—	0–2	2–0	0–1	2–0	0–0	3–0	2–1	1–0	1–1	0–3	2–1	4–0	1–2
Amathus Ayiou Tychona	3–2	—	0–0	2–0	0–1	3–1	1–0	6–0	4–1	1–3	0–0	4–0	2–2	1–0
Atlas Aglandjias	3–2	0–4	—	2–2	1–0	2–1	4–2	0–2	1–0	0–2	2–1	3–0	5–1	1–2
Doxa Paliometochou	4–0	1–2	0–2	—	0–1	1–0	3–1	1–0	1–1	0–1	0–2	0–3	4–1	0–0
Elia Lythrodonta	1–2	2–1	2–1	2–3	—	0–1	0–1	4–3	2–1	2–2	1–1	0–2	5–1	2–2
Elpida Xylofagou	1–0	1–1	4–3	0–2	0–1	—	2–1	2–1	2–3	1–1	0–1	0–0	1–0	0–2
Frenaros FC 2000	1–1	0–1	2–1	2–0	2–0	0–2	—	1–2	2–0	1–3	1–1	2–0	0–0	0–3
Iraklis Gerolakkou	4–1	1–1	2–1	1–1	3–0	1–0	1–1	—	3–2	1–4	3–3	3–4	1–1	1–0
Kornos FC 2013	1–1	1–2	1–1	1–1	3–1	1–1	1–1	1–5	—	1–1	0–0	1–0	5–0	4–3
Kouris Erimis	3–2	1–0	4–1	2–2	5–1	4–0	3–1	2–4	1–1	—	1–2	4–0	8–0	2–0
Omonia Psevda	4–1	3–0	4–0	6–2	2–1	0–0	0–0	1–0	3–1	1–3	—	2–0	4–1	1–0
Orfeas Nicosia	3–3	1–3	2–1	0–0	0–2	3–1	1–1	2–0	3–0	1–2	2–2	—	3–0	1–1
Poseidonas Giolou	0–0	0–6	0–7	1–5	1–2	0–5	2–2	0–2	1–0	0–4	2–5	0–2	—	1–8
Rotsidis Mammari	1–3	3–3	0–0	0–1	1–1	1–0	0–1	6–2	2–3	3–2	1–2	3–2	3–0	—

Source: Cyprus Football Association
Legend: Blue = home team win; Yellow = draw; Red = away team win.
For upcoming matches, an "a" indicates there is an article about the rivalry between the two participants.

== Sources ==
- "League standings". Cyprus Football Association.
- "Results". Cyprus Football Association.
- "Teams". Cyprus Football Association.
- "Scorers". Cyprus Football Association.

== See also ==
- STOK Elite Division
- 2017–18 Cypriot First Division
- 2017–18 Cypriot Second Division
- 2017–18 Cypriot Third Division
- 2017–18 Cypriot Cup for lower divisions
