= Evagoras Antoniou =

Cypriot footballer

Personal information
- Date of birth: 4 November 2002 (age 23)
- Place of birth: Kolossi, Cyprus
- Height: 1.87 m (6 ft 2 in)
- Position: Centre-back

Team information
- Current team: AEL Limassol
- Number: 33

Youth career
- 2014–2020: AEL Limassol

Senior career*
Years	Team	Apps	(Gls)
2020–2021	AEL Limassol	0	(0)
2020–2021	→ Kouris Erimis (loan)	13	(1)
2021–2023	Panathinaikos B	35	(0)
2023	Ceuta	0	(0)
2023–2024	AEZ Zakakiou	32	(1)
2024–2026	APOEL	26	(0)
2024–2025	→ Omonia Aradippou (loan)	12	(0)
2026	Argeș Pitești	0	(0)
2026–	AEL Limassol	6	(0)

International career^{‡}
2017–2018	Cyprus U16	8	(0)
2018	Cyprus U17	4	(0)
2020–2021	Cyprus U19	5	(1)
2022–2024	Cyprus U21	13	(0)
2026–	Cyprus	2	(0)
- * Club domestic league appearances and goals as of 31 October 2026 ‡ National team caps and goals as of 7 June 2026

Evagoras Antoniou (Greek: Ευαγόρας Αντωνίου; born 4 November 2002) is a Cypriot professional footballer who plays as a centre-back for Cypriot First Division club AEL Limassol and the Cyprus national team.

== Career ==
In 2024–25 season, Antoniou played on loan at Omonia Aradippou where he appeared 14 times. In January 2025, he returned to APOEL. In February, the International Centre for Sports Studies predicted Antoniou was the Cypriot player most likely to debut on the national team, with a 69.9 rating. By March, he became a starter for APOEL.

Prior to the Cyprus - San Marino match on 21 March 2025, Antoniou was called up to Cyprus national team. Antoniou took the field as a substitute, but did not appear in the game. Antoniou also appeared as an alternate in the 10 June 2025 match against Romania, but did not ultimately get any playing time.

== Career statistics ==
=== Club ===
As of 22 May 2026

Club	Season	League			Cypriot Cup		Europe		Other		Total	
Club	Season	Division	Apps	Goals	Apps	Goals	Apps	Goals	Apps	Goals	Apps	Goals
AEL Limassol	2020–21	Cypriot First Division	0	0	0	0	—		—		0	0
Kouris Erimis (loan)	2020–21	Cypriot Second Division	13	1	1	0	—		—		14	1
Panathinaikos B	2021–22	Super League Greece 2	25	0	—		—		—		25	0
Panathinaikos B	2022–23	Super League Greece 2	10	0	—		—		—		10	0
Panathinaikos B	Total		35	0	—		—		—		35	0
Ceuta	2023–24	Primera Federación	0	0	—		—		—		0	0
AEZ Zakakiou	2023–24	Cypriot First Division	32	1	2	0	—		—		34	1
APOEL	2024–25	Cypriot First Division	11	0	—		0	0	—		11	0
APOEL	2025–26	Cypriot First Division	15	0	3	0	—		—		18	0
APOEL	Total		26	0	3	0	0	0	—		29	0
Omonia Aradippou (loan)	2024–25	Cypriot First Division	12	0	2	0	—		—		14	0
Argeș Pitești	2026–27	Liga I	0	0	—		—		—		0	0
Career total			118	2	8	0	0	0	—		126	2

=== International ===
As of match played 7 June 2026

Appearances and goals by national team and year
National team	Year	Apps	Goals
Cyprus	2026	2	0
Total		2	0
