= Christos Karadais =

Greek footballer

Personal information
- Date of birth: 26 January 1999 (age 27)
- Place of birth: Drama, Greece
- Height: 1.83 m (6 ft 0 in)
- Position: Goalkeeper

Team information
- Current team: Iraklis Gerolakkou
- Number: 1

Youth career
- 2014–2018: Olympiacos

Senior career*
Years	Team	Apps	(Gls)
2018–2020	ASIL Lysi	18	(0)
2020–2021	Olympiakos Nicosia	5	(0)
2021	Olympias Lympion		
2021–2022	Ermis Aradippou	1	(0)
2024–2025	Chalkanoras Idaliou	0	(0)
2025–	Iraklis Gerolakkou	27	(0)
- * Club domestic league appearances and goals as of 3 May 2026

Christos Karadais (Greek: Χρήστος Καράδαης; born 26 January 1999) is a Greek professional footballer who plays as a goalkeeper for Cypriot Second Division club Iraklis Gerolakkou.
