= 2017–18 Cypriot Second Division =

Cypriot Second Division
- Season: 2017–18
- Champions: Enosis Neon Paralimni (3rd title)
- Promoted: Enosis Neon Paralimni
- Relegated: P.O. Xylotymbou; Ethnikos Assia; Chalkanoras
- Matches: 183
- Goals: 509 (2.78 per match)
- Top goalscorer: Georgios Kolokoudias (17 goals)
- Biggest home win: Enosis 6–0 Xylotymbou (17 February 2018)
- Biggest away win: Chalkanoras 0–4 Digenis (23 September 2017)
- Highest scoring: Chalkanoras 3–5 PAEEK (25 November 2017)
- Longest winning run: 6 matches Anagennisi
- Longest unbeaten run: 7 matches Karmiotissa
- Longest winless run: 12 matches Chalkanoras
- Longest losing run: 12 matches Chalkanoras
- All statistics correct as of 21 April 2018.

The 2017–18 Cypriot Second Division was the 63rd season of the Cypriot second-level football league. It began on 15 September 2017 and ended on 21 April 2018. Enosis Neon Paralimni won their third title.

== Team changes from 2016–17 ==
Teams promoted to 2017–18 Cypriot First Division

- Alki Oroklini
- Pafos FC
- Olympiakos Nicosia

Teams relegated from 2016–17 Cypriot First Division

- Karmiotissa
- Anagennisi Deryneia
- AEZ Zakakiou

Teams promoted from 2016–17 Cypriot Third Division

- P.O. Xylotymbou
- Digenis Oroklinis
- Chalkanoras Idaliou

Teams relegated to 2017–18 Cypriot Third Division

- Akritas Chlorakas
- ENAD Polis Chrysochous
- Enosis Neon Parekklisia

== Stadia and locations ==
Location of clubs in 2017–18 Cypriot Second Division

Note: Table lists clubs in alphabetical order.

Club	Location	Venue	Capacity
AEZ	Zakaki, Limassol	Zakaki Community Stadium	2,000
Anagennisi	Deryneia, Famagusta	Anagennisi Football Ground	5,800
ASIL	Larnaca	Grigoris Afxentiou Stadium	2,000
Ayia Napa	Ayia Napa, Famagusta	Ayia Napa Municipal Stadium	2,000
Chalkanoras	Dali, Nicosia	Chalkanoras Stadium	2,000
Digenis	Oroklini, Larnaca	Koinotiko Stadio Oroklinis	1,500
EN Paralimni	Paralimni, Famagusta	Tasos Markou Stadium	5,800
Ethnikos	Nicosia	Makario Stadium	16,000
Karmiotissa	Pano Polemidia, Limassol	Pano Polemidia Municipal Stadium	1,500
Omonia Ar.	Aradippou, Larnaca	Aradippou Municipal Stadium	2,500
Othellos	Athienou, Larnaca	Othellos Athienou Stadium	5,000
PAEEK	Lakatamia, Nicosia	Keryneia-Epistrophi Stadium	2,000
P.O. Xylotymbou	Xylotymbou, Larnaca	Dasaki Stadium	7,000
THOI	Lakatamia, Nicosia	THOI Lakatamia Stadium	3,500

== League table ==
Pos	Team	Pld	W	D	L	GF	GA	GD	Pts	Qualification or relegation
1	Enosis Neon Paralimni (C, P)	26	18	6	2	54	20	+34	60	Promotion to Cypriot First Division
2	Anagennisi Deryneia	26	18	5	3	53	23	+30	59	
3	Othellos Athienou	26	16	6	4	45	18	+27	54	
4	Ayia Napa	26	13	3	10	43	33	+10	42	
5	AEZ Zakakiou	26	12	5	9	36	26	+10	41	
6	Omonia Aradippou	26	11	5	10	39	32	+7	38	
7	Karmiotissa	26	9	10	7	41	36	+5	37	
8	ASIL Lysi	26	8	8	10	32	35	−3	32	
9	PAEEK	26	8	7	11	33	40	−7	31	
10	Digenis Oroklinis	26	7	7	12	29	50	−21	28	
11	THOI Lakatamia	26	6	8	12	25	39	−14	26	
12	P.O. Xylotymbou (R)	26	7	5	14	29	44	−15	26	Relegation to the Cypriot Third Division
13	Ethnikos Assia (R)	26	4	6	16	22	42	−20	18	Relegation to the Cypriot Third Division
14	Chalkanoras Idaliou (R)	26	3	3	20	23	65	−42	12	Relegation to the Cypriot Third Division

Source: CFA (in Greek)
Rules for classification: 1) Points; 2) Head-to-head points; 3) Head-to-head goal difference; 4) Head-to-head goals scored; 5) Head-to-head away goals scored (only if two teams); 6) Goal difference; 7) Goals scored; 8) Play-off (only if deciding championship round, relegation round or relegation).
(C) Champions; (P) Promoted; (R) Relegated

== Results ==
Home \ Away	AEZ	ANA	ASL	AYN	CHA	DOR	ENP	ETH	KAR	OMA	OTH	PAE	POX	THO
AEZ Zakakiou	—	0–2	1–0	0–0	4–2	3–0	0–3	0–0	1–1	2–0	1–0	5–2	1–0	0–0
Anagennisi	2–2	—	5–0	1–0	3–0	3–0	2–3	2–1	2–1	1–0	2–2	2–1	4–0	0–0
ASIL Lysi	1–2	2–2	—	4–2	2–0	3–0	0–1	0–2	0–0	1–2	1–0	0–0	2–0	0–2
Ayia Napa	1–0	0–3	3–0	—	5–0	3–0	2–3	2–0	4–3	1–0	1–0	2–0	2–3	0–2
Chalkanoras	0–4	1–2	1–2	0–2	—	0–4	1–3	1–0	1–4	0–2	0–1	3–5	1–3	3–1
Digenis Oroklinis	1–0	2–4	1–1	0–0	1–1	—	1–1	2–1	1–3	1–1	1–0	0–3	1–4	4–0
Enosis Neon Paralimni	3–1	0–0	2–2	1–0	3–0	5–1	—	3–1	3–1	1–0	1–1	1–2	6–0	1–0
Ethnikos Assia	1–0	1–2	0–3	1–2	2–3	1–2	0–1	—	1–1	2–4	0–3	0–1	1–1	2–2
Karmiotissa	1–0	3–4	1–1	0–4	1–1	4–1	0–0	1–1	—	1–0	0–3	1–2	4–0	1–1
Omonia Aradippou	2–1	0–1	3–2	4–2	5–2	1–1	0–2	1–1	1–3	—	1–1	1–1	2–1	4–0
Othellos Athienou	2–0	1–0	1–0	4–2	0–0	4–1	3–2	1–0	1–1	3–1	—	1–1	2–0	3–1
PAEEK	1–2	0–2	1–1	3–1	1–0	1–2	1–1	3–0	2–2	1–3	0–2	—	0–3	1–1
P.O. Xylotymbou	0–2	1–2	2–2	0–1	3–2	1–1	0–1	0–1	0–1	1–0	1–3	3–0	—	1–1
THOI Lakatamia	1–4	2–0	1–2	1–1	2–0	2–0	1–3	1–2	1–2	0–1	0–3	1–0	1–1	—

Source: Cyprus Football Association (in Greek)
Legend: Blue = home team win; Yellow = draw; Red = away team win.
For upcoming matches, an "a" indicates there is an article about the rivalry between the two participants.
