= Andreas Asimenos =

Cypriot footballer (born 2004)

Personal information
- Full name: Andreas Asimenos
- Date of birth: 7 February 2004 (age 22)
- Place of birth: Cyprus
- Height: 1.82 m (6 ft 0 in)
- Position: Midfielder

Team information
- Current team: AEZ Zakakiou
- Number: 14

Youth career
- Omonia

Senior career*
Years	Team	Apps	(Gls)
2020–2024	Omonia	5	(0)
2022–2023	→ MEAP Nisou (loan)	24	(0)
2023-2024	→ Olympiakos Nicosia	26	(1)
2024–	AEZ Zakakiou	17	(1)
- * Club domestic league appearances and goals as of 26 June 2025

Andreas Asimenos (born 7 February 2004) is a Cypriot footballer who plays as a midfielder for AEZ Zakakiou.

== Honours ==
Omonia

- Cypriot Cup: 2021–22
- Cypriot Super Cup: 2021
