= Cypriot Cup (disambiguation) =

The Cypriot Cup is the national knockout football tournament in Cyprus.

Cypriot Cup may also refer to:

- Cyprus Cup - a women's international football tournament in Cyprus.
- Cypriot Cup for lower divisions - a domestic cup for the teams who participate in lower divisions.
- Cypriot Cup (Northern Cyprus) - a national football tournament in Northern Cyprus.
