= Arsen Mihajlović =

Serbian footballer

Personal information
- Date of birth: 2 June 1969 (age 57)
- Place of birth: Kraljevo, SFR Yugoslavia
- Position: Midfielder

Senior career*
Years	Team	Apps	(Gls)
1992–1994	Anagennisi Giannitsa		(24)
1996–1997	Anorthosis Famagusta	24	(7)
1997–1998	APOP Paphos	23	(6)
1999–2000	Ethnikos Assia	22	(10)
2000–2002	Anorthosis Famagusta	39	(6)

Managerial career
- 2008-2009: Omonia Nicosia (asst.)
- 2009: Digenis Morphou
- 2012-2013: Digenis Morphou
- 2021-2022: Kormakitis
- 2022-2023: APOEL Nicosia (asst.)
- * Club domestic league appearances and goals

Arsen Mihajlović (born 2 June 1969) is a Serbian retired footballer.

He became a top 5-goalscorer in the Greek second tier twice, in 1992–93 and 1993–94, both for Anagennisi Giannitsa.
