= Dimitrios Kostopoulos =

Greek footballer (born 2003)

Personal information
- Full name: Dimitrios Kostopoulos
- Date of birth: 26 February 2003 (age 23)
- Place of birth: Volos, Greece
- Height: 1.86 m (6 ft 1 in)
- Position: Midfielder

Team information
- Current team: AEZ Zakakiou
- Number: 20

Youth career
- 2017–2022: Panathinaikos

Senior career*
Years	Team	Apps	(Gls)
2022–2023	Panathinaikos B	1	(0)
2023–2024	Diagoras Rodos	0	(0)
2024	Atromitos	0	(0)
2026–	AEZ Zakakiou	11	(1)

International career^{‡}
2021	Greece U19	1	(0)
- * Club domestic league appearances and goals as of 3 May 2026 ‡ National team caps and goals as of 2 September 2021

Dimitrios Kostopoulos (Greek: Δημήτριος Κωστόπουλος; born 26 February 2003) is a Greek professional footballer who plays as a midfielder for AEZ Zakakiou.
