= Cypriot Third Division =

- Organising body: Cyprus Football Association
- Founded: 1970; 56 years ago
- Country: Cyprus
- Confederation: UEFA
- Number of clubs: 16
- Level on pyramid: 3
- Promotion to: Cypriot Second Division
- Relegation to: STOK Elite Division
- Domestic cup: Cypriot Cup for lower divisions
- Current champions: Anagennisi Deryneia (1st title) (2025-26)
- Most championships: Akritas (3 titles); Digenis (3 titles); Ermis (3 titles); PAEEK (3 titles); THOI (3 titles); Chalkanoras Idaliou (3 titles)
- Website: http://www.cfa.com.cy/
- Current: 2026–27 Cypriot Third Division

The Cypriot Third Division (Greek: Πρωτάθλημα Γ΄ Κατηγορίας) is the third highest football division of the Cypriot football league system.

Administered by the Cyprus Football Association, it is contested by 16 teams, with the top three teams being promoted to the Cypriot Second Division and the last three teams being relegated to the STOK Elite Division.

== History ==
The Cypriot Third Division was held for the first time in the 1970–71 season as the third level of the Cypriot football. All the teams played against each other twice, once at their home and once away. The team with the most points at the end of the season crowned champions. This is the league's current format until present time.

The only season when the championship not held was during the 1974–75 season. Due to the Turkish invasion of Cyprus which forced many teams that had their headquarters to the north Cyprus to be closed temporarily or permanently, CFA decided to have a Special mixed championship of Second & Third Division. In this championship could participate all the teams of the Second and Third Division. Participation was optional. The championship had two geographical groups. The winners of each group were playing against each other in the final phase and the winners were the champions of the league. The winner was considered as the 1974–75 Cypriot Second Division champions.

Until the 1983–84 season, the teams that were relegated from the Cypriot Third Division were taking part in the next season's amateur leagues. From the 1984–85 season until the 2013–14 season, the teams that were relegated from the Cypriot Third Division were taking part in the next season's Cypriot Fourth Division. Since the 2014–15 season, the teams that are relegated from the Cypriot Third Division are taking part in the next season's STOK Elite Division.

From 1971–72 season until 2007–08 season, the Third Division teams were taking part in the Cypriot Cup. No Third Division team ever reached the final or the semifinals, but they managed to qualify to the quarter-finals once (Chalkanoras Idaliou in 1987–88). Since 2008–09 season, the Third Division teams are not allowed to participate in the Cypriot Cup, but they can take part to the Cypriot Cup for lower divisions (participation in this cup is not compulsory).

== Structure ==
The championship have the same structure since its foundation. All the teams are playing against each other twice, once at their home and once away. The team with the most points at the end of the season are crowned champions. In every season, the champions or the first teams were promoted to the Second Division, but in some seasons the relegation to the lower divisions didn't existed.

=== Current format ===
Sixteen clubs are competing in the league, facing each other at least once (either at home or away). Afterwards, the table split into two groups, with the top eight teams entering the promotion round and the bottom eight teams entering the relegation round. The champion, 2nd and 3rd placed teams are promoted to the Cypriot Second Division, whilst the bottom four are relegated to the STOK Elite Division.

=== Points system ===
The points system of the Cypriot Third Division changed during the years:

1. From 1970–71 until 1990–91 season, teams were awarded two points for a win, one point for a draw and zero points for a defeat.
2. Since 1991–92 season (until present time), teams are awarded three points for a win, one point for a draw and zero points for a defeat.

== Teams ==
The 16 teams which participate in the 2026-27 season of the Cypriot Third Division are:

- Achyronas-Onisilos FC
- AEK Kellia
- AEN Vrysoullon-Acheritou
- AEZ Zakakiou
- Alki Larnaca
- Anorthosis Mouttagiakas
- ASPIS Pylas
- Ethnikos Assia
- Ethnikos Latsion
- Kedros Ayia Marina Skylloura
- Livadia FC 2022
- Omonia Psevda
- Ormideia FC
- Othellos Athienou
- THOI Lakatamia
- Xylofagou FC

== Winners ==
The table presents all the winners since the 1970-71 season, when the competition officially began.

Season	Winner
1970–71	Keravnos Stovolou
1971–72	Ethnikos Asteras Limassol
1972–73	Neos Aionas Trikomou
1973–74	Iraklis Gerolakkou
1974–75	Not held
1975–76	Ermis Aradippou
1976–77	Akritas Chlorakas
1977–78	Adonis Idaliou
1978–79	Orfeas Nicosia
1979–80	Iraklis Gerolakkou
1980–81	Kentro Neotitas Maroniton
1981–82	Digenis Akritas Ipsona
1982–83	THOI Lakatamia
1983–84	Adonis Idaliou
1984–85	Orfeas Athienou
1985–86	APEP Limassol
1986–87	Elpida Xylofagou
1987–88	Digenis Akritas Morphou
1988–89	Digenis Akritas Ipsona
1989–90	APEP Pelendriou
1990–91	Othellos Athienou
1991–92	PAEEK

Season	Winner
1992–93	AEZ Zakakiou
1993–94	Othellos Athienou
1994–95	Ethnikos Latsion
1995–96	Ermis Aradippou
1996–97	Rotsidis Mammari
1997–98	AEZ Zakakiou
1998–99	Chalkanoras Idaliou
1999–00	THOI Lakatamia
2000–01	ASIL Lysi
2001–02	SEK Agiou Athanasiou
2002–03	PAEEK
2003–04	APOP Kinyras
2004–05	SEK Agiou Athanasiou
2005–06	AEM Mesogis
2006–07	Ermis Aradippou
2007–08	PAEEK
2008–09	Akritas Chlorakas
2009–10	Chalkanoras Idaliou
2010–11	Ethnikos Assia
2011–12	AEK Kouklia
2012–13	Karmiotissa Pano Polemidion
2013–14	Elpida Xylofagou

Season	Winner
2014–15	THOI Lakatamia
2015–16	Akritas Chlorakas
2016–17	P.O. Xylotymbou
2017–18	Onisilos Sotira
2018–19	Digenis Akritas Morphou
2019–20	Interrupted
2020–21	PAC Omonia 29M
2021–22	Peyia 2014
2022–23	Digenis Akritas Morphou
2023–24	Chalkanoras Idaliou
2024–25	Ethnikos Latsion
2025–26	Anagennisi Deryneia

=== Performance By Club ===
Club	Winners	Winning seasons
Ermis Aradippou	3	1975–76, 1995–96, 2006–07
Akritas Chlorakas	3	1976–77, 2008–09, 2015–16
THOI Lakatamia	3	1982–83, 1999–00, 2014–15
Digenis Akritas Morphou	3	1987–88, 2018–19, 2022–23
PAEEK	3	1991–92, 2002–03, 2007–08
Chalkanoras Idaliou	3	1998–99, 2009–10, 2023–24
Iraklis Gerolakkou	2	1973–74, 1979–80
Adonis Idaliou	2	1977–78, 1983–84
Digenis Akritas Ipsona	2	1981–82, 1988–89
Elpida Xylofagou	2	1986–87, 2013–14
Othellos Athienou	2	1990–91, 1993–94
AEZ Zakakiou	2	1992–93, 1997–98
Ethnikos Latsion	2	1994–95, 2024–25
SEK Agiou Athanasiou	2	2001–02, 2004–05
Keravnos Strovolou	1	1970–71
Ethnikos Asteras Limassol	1	1971–72
Neos Aionas Trikomou	1	1972–73
Orfeas Nicosia	1	1978–79
Kentro Neotitas Maroniton	1	1980–81
Orfeas Athienou	1	1984–85
APEP Pitsilia	1	1985–86
APEP Pelendriou	1	1989–90
Rotsidis Mammari	1	1996–97
ASIL Lysi	1	2000–01
APOP Kinyras	1	2003–04
AEM Mesogis	1	2005–06
Ethnikos Assia	1	2010–11
AEK Kouklia	1	2011–12
Karmiotissa	1	2012–13
P.O. Xylotymbou	1	2016–17
Onisilos Sotira	1	2017–18
PAC Omonia 29M	1	2020–21
Peyia 2014	1	2021–22
Anagennisi Deryneia	1	2025–26

== Appearances in the third division ==
The below table indicates the total number of seasons each club has participated in the Cypriot Third Division since 1970–71 up to and including the 2026–27 season season.

121 teams have played at least one season in the Cypriot Third Division.

Teams in bold are participating in the 2026-27 Cypriot Third Division.

Team	Participations
**Ethnikos Assia**	29
Iraklis Gerolakkou	26
**THOI Lakatamia**	24
Adonis Idaliou	23
Achyronas Liopetriou	22
AEK Kythreas	19
**Ethnikos Latsion**	19
Digenis Akritas Morphou	18
**Othellos Athienou**	18
**AEZ Zakakiou**	17
Chalkanoras Idaliou	17
Elpida Xylofagou	17
**Ormideia FC**	16
Akritas Chlorakas	15
ENAD Polis Chrysochous	14
Anagennisi Deryneia	13
ASIL Lysi	13
MEAP Nisou	13
PAEEK	13
AEK Katholiki	12
APEP FC	12
Ayia Napa FC	12
Elia Lythrodonta	12
Ermis Aradippou	12
Neos Aionas Trikomou	12
Digenis Akritas Ipsona	11
Doxa Katokopias	10
ASO Ormideia	9
Digenis Oroklinis	9
KNM	9
Achilleas Kaimakli	8
Anagennisi Germasogeias	8
Faros Acropoleos	8
Kouris Erimis	8
Spartakos Kitiou	8
Tsaggaris Peledriou	8
Frenaros FC	7
Olimpiada Neapolis	7
Orfeas Athienou	7
Orfeas Nicosia	7
OXEN Peristeronas	7

Team	Participations
APEP Pelendriou	6
ENAD Ayiou Dometiou	6
Enosis Kokkinotrimithia	6
Krasava ENY	6
Olympias Lympion	6
**Omonia Psevda**	6
SEK Agiou Athanasiou	6
AEK Ammochostos	5
AEK Kakopetrias	5
AEK Kouklia	5
Amathus Ayiou Tychona	5
APEA Akrotiri	5
Apollon Lympion	5
**ASPIS Pylas**	5
Ethnikos Asteras Limassol	5
Ethnikos Defteras	5
Kinyras Empas	5
Peyia 2014	5
AEK/Achilleas Ayiou Theraponta	4
AEM Mesogis	4
AEM Morphou	4
AEP Polemidion	4
APONA Anagyias	4
Elpida Astromeriti	4
**Kedros Ayia Marina Skylloura**	4
Rotsidis Mammari	4
**AEN**	3
Anagennisi Larnacas	3
**Anorthosis Mouttagiakas**	3
ASOB Vatili	3
Atromitos Yeroskipou	3
Doxa Paliometochou	3
ENAZ Agia Zoni Limassol	3
Finikas Ayias Marinas	3
Fotiakos Frenarou	3
Keravnos Strovolou	3
Kissos FC Kissonergas	3
LALL Lysi	3
Libanos Kormakiti	3
**Livadia FC 2022**	3
Omonia Aradippou	3

Team	Participations
P.O. Xylotymbou	3
Poseidon Larnacas	3
Sourouklis Troullon	3
Achyronas Liopetriou	2
AEK Karava	2
Anagennisi Trachoni	2
APEI Ipsona	2
Apollon Athienou	2
ATE PEK Ergaton	2
Enosis Neon Parekklisia	2
Geroskipou FC	2
Kormakitis FC	2
Livadiakos Livadion	2
Livadiakos/Salamina Livadion	2
Nikos & Sokratis Erimis	2
Olympos Xylofagou	2
Onisilos Sotira	2
Parthenon Zodeia	2
**AEK Kellion**	1
**Achyronas-Onisilos FC**	1
**Alki Larnaca**	1
Alki Oroklini	1
AMEP Parekklisia	1
APEAN Ayia Napas	1
APOP Kinyras	1
APOP Polis	1
Atlas Aglandjias	1
Dynamo Pervolion	1
Ellinismos Akakiou	1
Ethnikos Achna	1
FC Episkopis	1
Karmiotissa Pano Polemidion	1
Konstantios & Evripidis Trachoniou	1
Onisilos Sotira 2014	1
Oroklini-Troulloi FC	1
PAC Omonia 29M	1
PEFO Olympiakos	1
POL/AE Maroni	1
Th.O.I Avgorou	1
**Xilofagou FC**	1

Notes:

- Reference data is up until 2022/23, but the table above is until 2025/26
- Tsaggaris Peledriou has 7 participations as Tsaggaris Peledriou and 1 participation as Sotirios Pelendriou.
- APEP Pitsilias has 4 participations as APEP Limassol and 3 participations as APEP Pitsilias.
- AEM Mesogis has 2 participations as AEM Mesogis and 2 participations as AEM Mesogis/Giolou.

== See also ==
- Football in Cyprus
- Cypriot football league system
- Cypriot First Division
- Cypriot Second Division
- STOK Elite Division
- Cypriot Cup
- Cypriot Cup for lower divisions
