= Cypriot Cup for lower divisions =

- Organiser(s): Cyprus Football Association
- Founded: 2008; 18 years ago
- Region: Cyprus
- Current champions: Ermis Aradippou (1st title)
- Most championships: Digenis Morphou (2 titles)
- Broadcaster: Cytavision
- Website: cfacup.com.cy
- 2025–26 Cypriot Cup for lower divisions

The Cypriot Cup for lower divisions, formally known as the Cypriot Coca-Cola Cup of Third Division and STOK Elite Division (Greek: Κύπελλο Κύπρου Coca-Cola Γ΄ και Επίλεκτης Κατηγορίας ΣΤΟΚ) for sponsorship purposes, is a Cypriot knockout football club competition, hosted annually by the Cyprus Football Association.

== History ==
The Cypriot Cup for the lower divisions was created by the Cyprus Football Association and first held in the 2008-09 season. Digenis Morphou and Ermis Aradippou are the only clubs who participated in both cup competitions finals (Cypriot Cup & Cypriot Cup for lower divisions). Digenis Morphou is the only club who won this cup competition more than once.

== Format ==
Participation in this cup is optional, so the number of participating clubs differs each year. The competition is a knockout tournament. The matches in the first two rounds are single-legged, and the matches in the quarterfinals and semifinals are two-legged. The final is a single match played at a neutral ground. The winner and runner-up of the cup receive a respectable amount of money from the CFA as a bonus. The sponsor of the competition is Coca-Cola.

== Host stadiums (finals) ==
The final of the Cypriot Cup for lower divisions has taken place in seven different stadiums.

Stadium	N.	Seasons
Dasaki Stadium	6	2008–09, 2013–14, 2015–16, 2021–22, 2024–25, 2025–26
AEK Arena	4	2016–17, 2017–18, 2018–19, 2022–23
Geroskipou Stadium	2	2009–10, 2014–15
GSP Stadium	1	2010–11
Parekklisia Community Stadium	1	2011–12
Polis Chrysochous Municipal Stadium	1	2012–13
Antonis Papadopoulos Stadium	1	2023–24

== List of finals ==
The table below lists the teams that participated in the final of the cup each season.

Key to list of winners
*	Match went to extra time
†	Match decided via a penalty shoot-out after extra time
(#)	Number of trophy won by club

Season	Winner	Score	Runner-up
2008–09	Elpida Xylofagou (1)	2–1 *	Digenis Oroklinis
2009–10	Chalkanoras Idaliou (1)	1–0	AEK Kouklia
2010–11	Ethnikos Assia (1)	1–0	ENAD Polis Chrysochous
2011–12	Digenis Morphou (1)	2–1 *	AEK Kouklia
2012–13	THOI Lakatamia (1)	1–0	ENAD Polis Chrysochous
2013–14	Adonis Idaliou (1)	2–0	Elpida Xylofagou
2014–15	Akritas Chlorakas (1)	1–0	PAEEK
2015–16	Alki Oroklini (1)	2–1	P.O. Xylotympou
2016–17	P.O. Xylotympou (1)	2–1	Ethnikos Latsion
2017–18	Onisilos Sotira (1)	2–2 † (Note: Score was 2–2 after extra time. Onisilos Sotira won the penalty shoot-out 4–2.)	Akritas Chlorakas
2018–19	Digenis Morphou (2)	3–1	Olympias Lympion
2019–20	Abandoned due to COVID-19 pandemic		
2020–21	Abandoned due to COVID-19 pandemic		
2021–22	ENY Digenis Ypsona (1)	4–1	Ethnikos Assias
2022–23	ASIL Lysi (1)	2–1	Digenis Morphou
2023–24	Spartakos Kitiou (1)	1–1 † (Note: Score was 1–1 after extra time. Spartakos Kitiou won the penalty shoot-out 4–2.)	Kouris Erimis
2024–25	APEA Akrotiri (1)	3–2	Doxa Paliometochou
2025–26	Ermis Aradippou (1)	2–1 *	Ormideia FC

== Performance per club ==
Club	Winners	Runners-up	Winning Seasons
Digenis Morphou	2	1	2011–12, 2018–19
Elpida Xylofagou	1	1	2008–09
Akritas Chlorakas	1	1	2014–15
P.O. Xylotymbou	1	1	2016–17
Ethnikos Assia	1	1	2010–11
Chalkanoras Idaliou	1	–	2009–10
THOI Lakatamia	1	–	2012–13
Adonis Idaliou	1	–	2013–14
Alki Oroklini	1	–	2015–16
Onisilos Sotira	1	–	2017–18
ENY Digenis Ypsona	1	–	2021–22
ASIL Lysi	1	–	2022–23
Spartakos Kitiou	1	–	2023–24
APEA Akrotiri	1	–	2024–25
Ermis Aradippou	1	–	2025–26
AEK Kouklia	–	2	
ENAD Polis Chrysochous	–	2	
Digenis Oroklinis	–	1	
PAEEK	–	1	
Ethnikos Latsion	–	1	
Olympias Lympion	–	1	
Kouris Erimis	–	1	
Doxa Paliometochou	–	1	
Ormideia FC	–	1	
