= Christoforos Tsolakis =

Cypriot footballer (born 2001)

Personal information
- Full name: Christoforos Tsolakis
- Date of birth: October 30, 2001 (age 25)
- Place of birth: Limassol, Cyprus
- Height: 1.78 m (5 ft 10 in)
- Position: Defender

Senior career*
Years	Team	Apps	(Gls)
2018–2020	Apollon Limassol	1	(0)
2020–2021	Olympiakos Nicosia	0	(0)
- * Club domestic league appearances and goals as of 10:49, 30 January 2021 (UTC)

Christoforos Tsolakis (Greek: Χριστοφορος Τσολακης, born 30 October 2001) is a Cypriot footballer, who played for Olympiakos Nicosia. He is currently a free agent.
