= Omonia Psevda =

Cypriot football club

Omonia Psevda FD
- Full name: Omonia Psevda Football Department
- Founded: 1969
- Ground: Psevdas Community Stadium
- Capacity: 2000
- Chairman: Christodoulos Charalambous
- Manager: Andreas Eleftheriou
- League: Third Division
- 2025–26: Third Division, 13th of 16
- Website: http://www.acomoniapsevda.com.cy
Home colours	Away colours

Omonia Psevda (Greek: Ομόνοια Ψευδά) is a Cypriot football team based in Psevdas, Larnaca.

== History ==
Omonia Psevda FD was founded in 1969 and is one of the two departments of AC Omonia Psevda.

Until 2017 competed in the Larnaka District Football Association (EPEL). In 2017 it was secured through the inclusion championship the rally in the STOK Elite Division. In the same year win the Championship of STOK Champions. The team won 6 titles in overall, winning all the events in which they participated.

In season 2017–18, the team finished second in the championship winning the promotion in the Third Division. Until the penultimate fixture it was in the first place, but in the last game, the game was a draw and the team went to second place.

In season 2018–19, made club history as they finished 2nd which earned them promotion to the Cypriot Second Division for the 2019-20 season.

Omonia Psevda at CFA competitions
Season	League										Cup	
Season	Division	Position	Teams	Played	Won	Drawn	Lost	Goals		Points	Cup	Round
Season	Division	Position	Teams	Played	Won	Drawn	Lost	For	Against	Points	Cup	Round
2017–18	D	2	14	26	16	8	2	54	22	32	Lower Division Cup	Second round
2018-19	C	2	16	30	18	4	8	50	35	58	Lower Division Cup	Semi-final
Standings: Win=3 points, Draw=1 point, Lose=0 points												

== Current squad ==
As of 8 September 2020

Note: Flags indicate national team as defined under FIFA eligibility rules; some limited exceptions apply. Players may hold more than one non-FIFA nationality.

No.	Pos.	Nation	Player
2	MF	CYP	Angelos Siathas
4	DF	CRO	Stjepan Salic
5	DF	CYP	Giannis Katsiaris (Vice captain)
6	DF	CYP	Pavlos Kourtides
7	FW	CYP	Panayiotis Panayiotou
8	MF	CYP	Antonis Hadjispyrou
9	FW	CRO	Marijan Šuto
10	MF	CYP	Michalis Papasokratous
11	FW	SLE	Lawrence Panda
12	MF	CYP	Theodoros Katsiaris (Captain)
13	FW	CYP	Andreas Georgiou
14	MF	CYP	Demetris Pratziotis
15	MF	CRO	Martin Musulin
17	FW	CYP	Constantinos Kouloumbris

No.	Pos.	Nation	Player
20	FW	CYP	Vassilis Kourtides
21	MF	CYP	Panayiotis Papaperikleous
22	MF	CYP	Spyros Ioannou
23	DF	CYP	Soteris Hadjipanayi
30	GK	CRO	Darijan Radelić-Žarkov
44	DF	CYP	Sokratis Papasokratous
77	FW	CYP	Stavros Stavrou
78	FW	CYP	Theodoros Georgiou
88	MF	CRO	Luka Pačar
89	MF	CYP	Grigoris Nicolaou
90	MF	CYP	Michalis Papaconstantinou
91	DF	CYP	Constantinos Antoniou
99	FW	SLE	Osman Koroma

For recent transfers, see List of Cypriot football transfers summer 2020.

== Honours ==
- CFA Integration Championship:
  - Winners (1): 2017
- Championship of STOK Champions:
  - Winners (1): 2017
- Nikos Zampas Shield:
  - Winners (1): 2017
- EPEL Championship:
  - Winners (15): 1970–71, 1972–73, 1977–78, 1985–86, 1987–88, 1992–93, 1993–94, 1994–95, 1995–96, 2001–02, 2003–04, 2005–06, 2013–14, 2015–16, 2016–17
- EPEL Cup:
  - Winners (5): 1987–88, 2010–11, 2014–15, 2015–16, 2016–17
- EPEL Shield:
  - Winners (3): 2011, 2015, 2016

== See also ==
- Football in Cyprus
