= Poseidonas Giolou =

Cypriot football club

- Founded: 1970; 55 years ago
- Ground: Giolou Municipality Stadium
- League: Regional League
- 2017–18: STOK Elite Division, 14th (relegated)

Poseidonas Giolou is a Cypriot association football club based in Giolou, located in the Paphos District. Its stadium is the Giolou Municipality Stadium. It has 10 participations in Cypriot Fourth Division.
