= Atlas Aglandjias =

Cypriot football club

- Founded: 1938; 87 years ago
- League: STOK Elite Division
- 2021–22: STOK Elite Division, 5th

Atlas Aglandjias is a Cypriot association football club based in Aglandjia, located in the Nicosia District. Its stadium is the Anagennisi Lythrodonta Ground and its colours are red and blue. It has 1 participation in Cypriot Fourth Division. Previous it has Futsal and Table tennis.
