= MEAP Nisou =

Cypriot football club

- Full name: Mikti Erithrou Astera Proodou Pera Choriou Nisou
- Nickname: MEAP Nisou
- Founded: 1980; 46 years ago
- Ground: Theodorio Koinotiko (Nisou)
- Capacity: 1,000
- Chairman: Andreas Chrysostomou
- League: Second Division
- 2024–25: Second Division, 8th of 16
Home colours	Away colours

MEAP Pera Choriou Nisou (Greek: ΜΕΑΠ Πέρα Χωριού Νήσου; short for Μικτή Ερυθρού Αστέρα Προόδου Πέρα Χωριού Νήσου, Mikti Erithrou Astera Proodou, "Selected team of Erithros Asteras and Proodos") is a Cypriot football club from the village of Nisou. The club was founded in the small town of Nisou near the city of Nicosia in 1981, following the merge of Erithros Asteras (Red Star) and Proodos (Progress). The colors of the team are red and white. The club currently competes in the Cypriot Second Division.

== History ==
=== Establishment ===
Pera Chorio-Nisou community consists of 2 neighboring villages, Nisou and Pera Chorio. In 1958, the first sports club in Pera Horio was founded under the name Athletic Youth Club (Α.Ο.Ν.). A few months after the founding of the club came to Cyprus for friendly matches Red Star Belgrade, an important and well known team of the time in Europe. The AO.N. hosted the Red Star at her club and for that reason, in 1959, it was decided to rename the club to Erythros Asteras (Red Star). At the same time, at Nisou was established the club Proodos (Progress). Both teams were part of the same federation of rural football, The Federation of Nicosia (POEL), in which the Erythros Asteras was one of founding members and were competing at the same league. There was rivalry between the two teams.

In 1979, it was decided to merge the two groups, which took place in 1980. The new club was named Mikti Erithrou Astera Proodou (MEAP). From the first period, the united team claimed its promotion to the third division, but lost to the semi-finals of the STOK championship.

=== Early years ===
In the early years, the presence of the MEAP in the agricultural championship that participated was moderate. In 1984, the fourth division was formed, involving associations from the agricultural federations, following the suggestions of the federations themselves. For political reasons, POEL did not propose MEAP, although at that time it had won the championship of the federation, the championship of the championships and had reached the semifinals of the STOK championship. However, in the following period the club secured its promotion through the STOK championship.

=== Period 1986–1999 ===
In 1986, the club promoted in the Cyprus Football Association (CFA) as a fourth division member. From 1986 to 2000 it participated in the fourth division.

=== 2000–2009 decade ===
In the 1999–00 season won the fourth division championship and also the climbing ticket in the third division. There were 4 consecutive appearances third division championship, where the team finished in positions in the first half of the table, culminating in the 2003–04 season that secured the second place and the promotion in the second division.

In second division the team participated for six consecutive seasons. In the 2005–06 season it finished in 6th place, the highest position in its history. The next period, it reached the round of 16 of the Cypriot Cup, which is its best proceeding in the competition.

=== 2010– decade ===
In the 2009–10 season the club ranked 14th and in the last position of the championship and was relegated to the third division. There was another relegation to the fourth division in the following season. It remained for two periods in fourth division. In the 2012–13 season won the championship and gained the promotion to third division. The following season finished fifth in the championship. In the 2014–15 season finished in 4th place, just two points behind the third place leading to the second division. In the 2017–18 season finished in second place of the championship, ensuring its return to the second division.

== Current squad ==
As of 15 September 2026

Note: Flags indicate national team as defined under FIFA eligibility rules; some limited exceptions apply. Players may hold more than one non-FIFA nationality.

No.	Pos.	Nation	Player
4	DF	CYP	Theocharis Chari
5	DF	CYP	Giorgos Papathanasiou
6	MF	CYP	Christodoulos Thoma (on loan from AEK Larnaca)
7	FW	CYP	Filippos Papouis
8	MF	CYP	Vasilis Christodoulou
9	FW	POR	Mario Gassama
10	FW	CIV	Philippe Alipui
11	FW	CYP	Petros Ioannou (on loan from AEK Larnaca)
12	FW	ENG	Luke Jhon Tunnah
17	MF	CYP	Apostolis Kanellopoulos
18	MF	SEN	Arona Fall

No.	Pos.	Nation	Player
19	DF	CYP	Panagiotis Tsivikos
20	DF	CYP	Nikolas Kyriakidis
22	DF	FRA	Thadée Kaleba
24	MF	CYP	Spyros Konstantinou
25	DF	CYP	Christos Papadopoulos
32	GK	SVK	Branislav Chudik
40	GK	CYP	Sotiris Kelepeshi
70	MF	CYP	Gavriel Psilogenis (on loan from AC Omonia)
76	FW	CYP	Pieris Papouis
77	FW	CYP	Christos Kyzas
89	FW	CYP	Alexandros Efstathiou (on loan from AEL Limassol)

== Honours ==
- Cypriot Fourth Division Winners: 2

2000, 2013
