= Iraklis Gerolakkou =

Cypriot football club

- Full name: Neolaia Agroton Iraklis Gerolakkou
- Founded: 1948; 78 years ago
- Ground: Leventeio Stadio Ethnikou Defteras, Kato Deftera
- Capacity: 1000
- Chairman: Costas Papageorgiou
- League: Second Division
- 2025–26: Second Division, 13th of 16

Iraklis Gerolakkou is a Cypriot football team currently playing in the Second Division. The team was established in Gerolakkos, Nicosia in 1948. The current manager is Costas Papageorgiou.

The club has played two seasons in the Cypriot Second Division.

== League participations ==
- Cypriot Second Division: 2005–2007
- Cypriot Third Division: 2007–2008, 2009–2010
- Cypriot Fourth Division: 2008–2009, 2010–

== Players ==
As of 15 September 2026

Note: Flags indicate national team as defined under FIFA eligibility rules; some limited exceptions apply. Players may hold more than one non-FIFA nationality.

| No. | Pos. | Nation | Player |
|---|---|---|---|
| 1 | GK | GRE | Christos Karadais |
| 2 | DF | BLR | Anatoliy Zubovskiy |
| 3 | DF | CYP | Andreas Patetsa |
| 4 | DF | CYP | Nikolas Chanappas |
| 5 | DF | CYP | Andreas Schizas |
| 6 | MF | CYP | Theodoros Papapanagiotou |
| 8 | MF | CYP | Diogenis Sergidis |
| 9 | FW | CYP | Sotiris Kaiafas |
| 10 | MF | CYP | Christos Charalabous |
| 12 | MF | CYP | Leonidas Varnava |
| 14 | DF | CYP | Christoforos Charalampous |
| 17 | MF | CYP | Savvas Papadopoulos |
| 18 | MF | CYP | Michalis Chatzigeorgiou |

| No. | Pos. | Nation | Player |
|---|---|---|---|
| 19 | MF | CYP | Kyriakos Sotiriou |
| 20 | DF | CYP | Nektarios Kattos |
| 22 | MF | CYP | Konstantinos Menikou |
| 23 | DF | CYP | Giorgos Sokratous |
| 24 | FW | GRE | Antonis Gaitanidis |
| 26 | MF | CYP | Christos Savva |
| 27 | GK | CYP | Andreas Konstantinou |
| 29 | FW | CYP | Ioannis Chatzigiannis |
| 50 | FW | CPV | Ghillian Ilaria |
| 79 | GK | ROU | Victor Drenea |
| 90 | FW | CMR | Eva Wankewai |
| — | MF | COL | Cristobal Di Ruggiero |

== Honours ==
- Cypriot Third Division

Winners (2): 1973–74, 1979–80

- STOK Elite Division:

Winners (1): 2018–19 (shared record)
