= AEZ Zakakiou =

Cypriot football club

- Full name: Athletic Union of Zakaki
- Founded: 1956; 70 years ago
- Ground: Parekklisia Community Stadium
- Chairman: Nikos Tsikkou
- Manager: Vladica Petrović
- League: Second Division
- 2024–25: Second Division, 4th of 16
Home colours	Away colours

Athletic Union of Zakaki (Greek: Αθλητική Ένωση Ζακακίου) is a Cypriot football club based in Zakaki, Limassol. The club was founded in 1956. Their colours are green and white and they play at Zakaki Municipal Stadium, but are currently playing at the larger Ammochostos Stadium in Larnaca.

== Chairman ==
The Chairman of AEZ Zakakiou, Stelios Christou, holds a unique record. He was one of the founders of the club in 1956, and he has been involved in the management of the club since 1957, and from 1986 leads the club as a chairman.

== Current squad ==
As of 6 March, 2026

Note: Flags indicate national team as defined under FIFA eligibility rules; some limited exceptions apply. Players may hold more than one non-FIFA nationality.

No.	Pos.	Nation	Player
1	GK	CYP	Andreas Violaris
5	MF	SLE	Mohamed Bangura
6	MF	CYP	Giorgos Kondylis
7	FW	CYP	Theodoros Iosifidis
9	FW	ALB	Vasil Shkurtaj
10	MF	GRE	Vasilios Angelopoulos
11	FW	CYP	Michalis Kolias
13	DF	CYP	Paris Zakakiotis
14	MF	CYP	Giorgos Asprou
16	MF	CYP	Spyros Konstantinou
18	GK	CYP	Neofytos Stylianou
20	MF	GRE	Dimitrios Kostopoulos
23	FW	CYP	Nikolas Mattheou

No.	Pos.	Nation	Player
29	DF	FRA	Yamine Abair
30	MF	CYP	Christoforos Tsolakis
31	MF	GNB	Nani Soares
33	MF	CYP	Sokratis Mylopoulos
54	GK	CYP	Konstantinos Andreou
67	DF	GRE	Manolis Liakos
70	FW	RUS	Andrey Arutyunyan
76	DF	CYP	Michael Odysseos
79	FW	GRE	Alexandros Baci
88	DF	CYP	Konstantinos Ioannou
90	FW	GRE	Michalis Tsampourakis
91	DF	CYP	Minas Theodosiou

=== Out on loan ===
Note: Flags indicate national team as defined under FIFA eligibility rules; some limited exceptions apply. Players may hold more than one non-FIFA nationality.

No.	Pos.	Nation	Player

== League history (from 2009 onwards) ==
Season	League	Place	Notes
2008–09	Third Division	4th	
2009–10	Third Division	5th	
2010–11	Third Division	8th	
2011–12	Third Division	3rd	Promoted to Second Division
2012–13	Second Division	10th	Relegated to B2
2013–14	Second Division (B2)	3rd	Divisions B1 and B2 were unified
2014–15	Second Division	4th	
2015–16	Second Division	2nd	Promoted to First Division
2016–17	First Division	13th	Relegated to Second Division
2017–18	Second Division	5th	
2018–19	Second Division	9th	
2019–20	Second Division	12th	Season abandoned due to COVID-19 pandemic
2020–21	Second Division	15th	Relegated to Third Division
2021–22	Third Division	4th	Promoted to Second Division
2022–23	Second Division	2nd	Promoted to First Division
2023–24	First Division	14th	Relegated to Second Division
2024–25	Second Division	4th	

== Honours ==
- Cypriot Third Division: 2

1992–93, 1997–98

- Cypriot Fourth Division: 2

1986–87, 1991–92 (Limassol-Paphos Group)
