= ENAD Polis Chrysochous FC =

Cypriot football club

ENAD Polis Chrysohous
- Full name: ΕNAΔ Πόλης Χρυσοχούς
- Founded: 1994; 31 years ago
- Dissolved: 2024; 1 year ago
- Ground: Polis Chrysochous Municipal Stadium
- Capacity: 4000
- Manager: Kostas Kaifas
- League: Third Division
- 2023–24: Second Division, 14th (relegated)
Home colours	Away colours

ENAD Polis Chrysochous FC (Greek: ΕΝΑΔ Πόλης Χρυσοχούς) was a football club based in Polis, Paphos, Cyprus. It had 4 appearances in Cypriot Second Division. The team was established in 1994 after two local teams, Akamas Polis Chrysochous and Demetrakis Argakas, were united. In 2024, ENAD merged with Foinikas Agia Marina Chrysochous to form APOP Polis Chrysochous.

== History ==
After the unification of the two local clubs, the whole Chrysochous area was united to provide a single Professional Football Team (EN for Enosis or in English United, A for Akamas and D for Demetrakis ). The team started playing for the local unprofessional championship of the Pafos area.

In 2002 ENAD entered the 4th Division of the Cyprus Championship. After a successful year in the 4th Division, the team was promoted to the Cypriot 3rd Division in 2003 where they played for four consecutive seasons. Among their achievements during that period is the participation in the National cup league group stage for the 2004–05 season, with teams from all professional CFA divisions. In 2007–08 the club was relegated back to the 4th Division. This was mainly caused through financial problems created by having to play the club's home games at other grounds in the Pafos area, away from their own fan base, whilst the Polis Stadium was developed. Nevertheless, after a reestablishment to the management status of the club, in the 2008–09 season, EN.A.D. managed to return to the 3rd Division.

== ENAD POLIS CHRYSOCHOUS in their ground ==
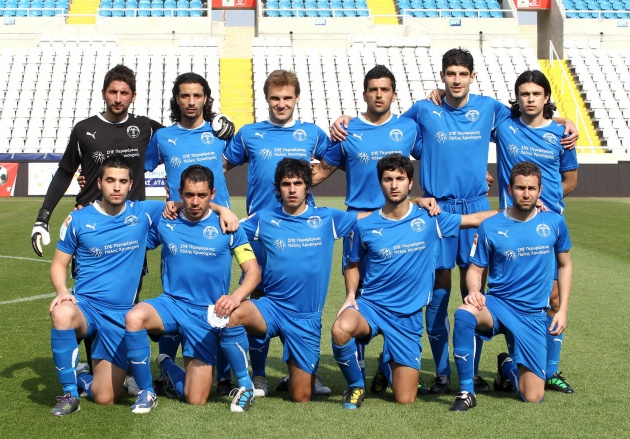
ENAD Polis Chrysochous FC at 2010–11 Cypriot Cup for lower divisions final.

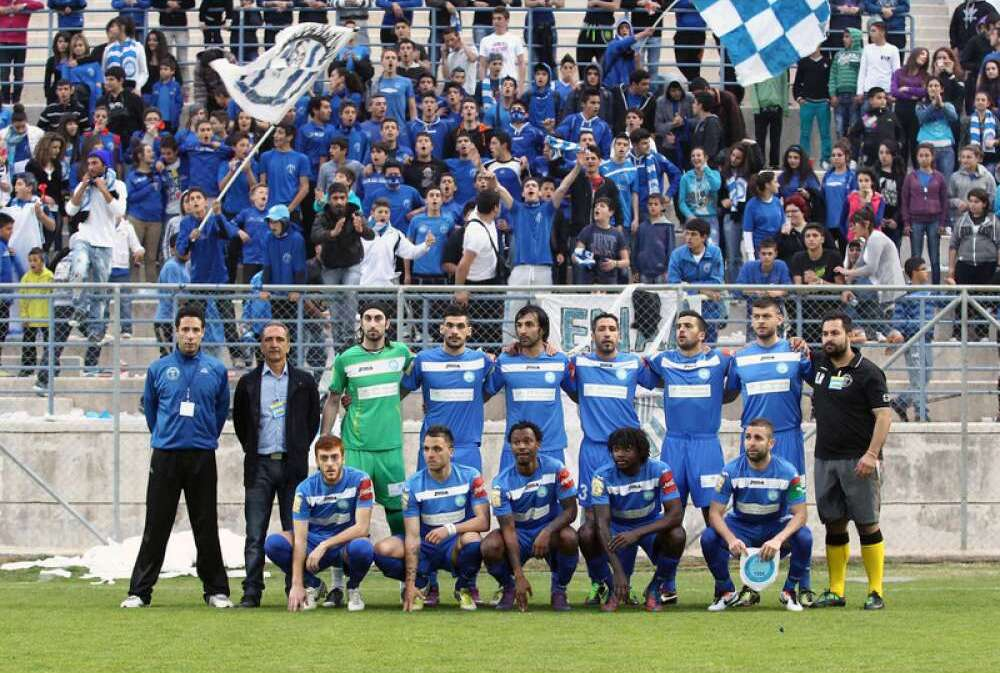
ENAD Polis Chrysochous FC at 2012–13 Cypriot Cup for lower divisions final.

The past three seasons have seen the club playing in the new Municipality Stadium of Polis and consolidate its position in the 3rd Division finishing 4th in 2010 – 2011 just missing promotion to the 2nd Division. Moreover, during this same season the team won through to the Cup Final for Divisions 3 and 4, but they were defeated 1 – 0. With the team returning to its own ground, there was a large increase in the fans support. Indeed, this can be exemplified by the fact that during the past season, EN.A.D. remained undefeated in all home games.

Of course, people close to the team know that this is not enough. Increasingly the club has to make changes to its Financial Structure and Organization to meet the challenges ahead. Their philosophy however is to make the club successful and closer to the community. This in turn and at the same time can help to develop and grow the prosperity and well-being of this region's whole community.

== ENAD Football Academies ==
After returning to Polis, the academy saw 130 young people receiving expert coaching, with many young players promoting to the First Team making their debuts for the club at the age of even 14 years old. Last season saw the academy Under 17 team achieving 4th position in the Cyprus U-17 National League. This season the club will have a U-21 and U-15 team and it is hoped that more young players will be able to rise to the First Team Squad. Young players are, of course, the life blood of any football club.

== Current squad ==
As of 23 October 2023

Note: Flags indicate national team as defined under FIFA eligibility rules; some limited exceptions apply. Players may hold more than one non-FIFA nationality.

No.	Pos.	Nation	Player
1	GK	CYP	Andreas Vasiliou
2	DF	CYP	Christoforos Tsolakis
6	MF	CYP	Andreas Pachipis
7	FW	ISR	Dor Edri
8	DF	CYP	Georgios Ikonomou
9	FW	ALB	Vasil Shkurti
10	MF	CYP	Dimitrios Froxylias
11	FW	CYP	Panagiotis Loukaidis
12	MF	GHA	Benjamín
13	DF	HAI	Kevin Lafrance
16	DF	ESP	Dennis Nieblas

No.	Pos.	Nation	Player
17	MF	TUN	Mohamed Sassi
19	MF	CYP	Evagoras Charalambous
20	FW	CYP	Giannis Mavrou
23	MF	CYP	Gerasimos Fyklatou
29	FW	LBN	Mohamed Sabbah
31	MF	GNB	Nani Soares
32	FW	ARG	Gian Franco Salerno
39	GK	POL	Kamil Bielikow
46	MF	CYP	Andreas Patsalidis
70	FW	CYP	Michalis Konstantinidis
73	GK	GRE	Grigoris Kiourtzidis
99	FW	COL	Johan Rodallega (on loan from Atlético Cali)
