= Anagennisi Deryneia FC =

Association football team in Deryneia, Cyprus

Anagennisi Deryneia
- Full name: Anagennisi Deryneia; Greek: Αναγέννηση Δερύνειας
- Founded: 1920; 106 years ago
- Ground: Anagennisi Football Ground
- Capacity: 5,800
- Chairman: Nicos Lillis
- Manager: Pavel Dreksa
- League: Second Division
- 2025–26: Third Division, 1st of 16 (promoted)
Home colours	Away colours

Anagennisi Deryneia (Greek: Αναγέννηση Δερύνειας) is a Cypriot football team based in Deryneia, Famagusta. The club was founded in 1920 and they joined the Cyprus Football Association in 1972. The team played in the Cypriot First division in 2011 but was relegated at the end of the season. It has participated in the first and second divisions and Cypriot Third Division in the past. The club also maintains a volleyball team, which is currently playing in the Second Division, having lifted the Cypriot Cup trophy twice in the past.

(not to be confused with Anagennisi Karditsas F.C.)

== Supporters ==
The official fan club of Anagennisis is called TIFIOZI, established in 2009.

== Players ==
As of 15 September 2026

Note: Flags indicate national team as defined under FIFA eligibility rules; some limited exceptions apply. Players may hold more than one non-FIFA nationality.

No.	Pos.	Nation	Player
1	GK	CYP	Dimitris Christodoulou
6	MF	CYP	Theodoros Kolokoudias
7	MF	CYP	Dimitris Mavroudis
9	FW	GRE	Theodoros Morfakis
10	FW	CYP	Pantelis Gavriil
11	FW	CYP	Leontios Dimosthenous
13	GK	CYP	Theodoros Koutsou
14	FW	CYP	Giorgos Ioannou (on loan from Anorthosis)
15	MF	CYP	Nikos Katziis
17	DF	CYP	Stylianos Adamou
19	FW	UKR	Yaroslav Levshyn
20	MF	CYP	Marios Nikolaou
21	MF	GRE	Konstantinos Kolonias

No.	Pos.	Nation	Player
22	DF	BIH	Milan Jević
24	DF	CYP	Giorgos Asprou
28	MF	GRE	Georgios Neofytidis
29	DF	CYP	Spyros Panteli
33	MF	GRE	Michalis Gialedakis
34	MF	CYP	Christos Beis
47	DF	CYP	Andreas Marselli (on loan from Nea Salamis)
53	DF	GHA	Daniel Mensah
71	FW	BRA	Vitor Venâncio
77	DF	CYP	Chrysanthos Mantzalos
80	GK	CYP	Ali Rıza Kırçay
99	FW	CMR	Charles Eloundou
—	FW	SRB	Davor Rakić

=== Technical and medical staff ===
Position	Staff
Head coach	(Cyprus) Panayiotis Kosma
Assistant coach A'	(Cyprus) Adamos Adamou
Assistant coach B'	(Cyprus) Stefanos Anastasiou
Fitness coach	(Cyprus) Stavros Katsakas
Goalkeeper coach	(Cyprus) Fotis Xenofontos
Physiotherapist	(Cyprus) Marios Kosma
Caregiver	(Cyprus) Demetris Savva

== League history ==
2009–10 Anagennisis finished in 3rd position in the Cypriot Third Division and gained promotion to the Second Division.

2010–11 Anagennisis finished in 3rd position in the Cypriot Second Division and gained promotion to First Division.

2011–12 Anagennisis finished in 13th position in the Cypriot First Division and was relegated to Second Division.

2012–13 Anagennisis finished in 4th position in the Cypriot Second Division.

2013–14 Anagennisis finished in 3rd position in the Cypriot Second division.

== Honours ==
=== Football ===
- Cypriot Second Division: 2

1998–99, 2002–03

== Managers ==
- (Russia) Anatoly Baidachny (1992–1993)
- (Cyprus) Apostolos Makridis (2018–2019)
- (Cyprus) Christos Siailis (2019)
- (Cyprus) Marinos Satsias (2019)
- (Cyprus) Giorgos Kosma (2021–2022)
- (Cyprus) Panayiotis Kosma (2022)
- (Cyprus) Panikos Kosma (2022)
- (Cyprus) Nikos Nikolaou (2022–2024)
- (Cyprus) Adamos Adamou (2024)
- (Cyprus) Nikolas Nikolaou (2024)
- (Malta) André Schembri (2024)
- (Cyprus) Adamos Adamou (2024–2025)
- (Czech Republic) Pavel Dreksa (2025–)
