= Achyronas Liopetriou =

Cypriot football club

- Founded: 1960
- Dissolved: 2022
- Ground: Liopetri Municipality Stadium
- Chairman: Loukas Panayiotou
- Manager: Panayiotis Kosma
- 2021–22: Second Division, 14th
| Home colours | Away colours |

Achyronas Liopetriou was a Cypriot football club based in Liopetri. Founded in 1956, the club played in the Cypriot Second, Third, and Fourth Divisions.

On 23 June 2022, the club merged with Onisilos Sotira 2014 to form Achyronas-Onisilos.

== Current squad ==
As of 21 September 2021

Note: Flags indicate national team as defined under FIFA eligibility rules; some limited exceptions apply. Players may hold more than one non-FIFA nationality.

| No. | Pos. | Nation | Player |
|---|---|---|---|
| 2 | MF | CYP | Nicolas Aristotelous |
| 3 | DF | GHA | Daniel Mensah |
| 4 | DF | CYP | Georgios Hadjiconstantis |
| 5 | MF | GRE | Nikolaos Doukas |
| 6 | MF | POR | Julien Fernandes |
| 7 | MF | FRA | Brice Goupy |
| 8 | MF | CYP | Giorgos Nikolaou |
| 10 | MF | GRE | Konstantinos Semirtzidis (Captain) |
| 11 | MF | CYP | Kyriacos Christou |
| 12 | MF | CYP | Kyriacos Stylianou (Vice captain) |
| 13 | GK | CYP | Pavlos Simou |
| 14 | DF | CYP | Theodoulos Theodoulou |

| No. | Pos. | Nation | Player |
|---|---|---|---|
| 15 | MF | CYP | Symeon Kone |
| 17 | FW | CYP | Efthymios Georgiou |
| 19 | FW | CYP | Kyriakos Chatziaros |
| 20 | FW | CYP | Georgios Marti (3rd captain) |
| 21 | MF | USA | Alex Dalou |
| 22 | DF | CYP | Giorgos Koushiappa (on loan from Ethnikos Achna) |
| 27 | DF | CYP | Sergios Hadjidemetriou |
| 33 | DF | CYP | Christos Kkone |
| 34 | DF | CYP | Christoforos Charalambous |
| 77 | FW | CYP | Leontios Demosthenous |
| 90 | GK | CYP | Andreas Loizou |
| 94 | FW | FRA | Yoann Tribeau |
| 99 | GK | AUS | Yanni Delengas |

For recent transfers, see List of Cypriot football transfers summer 2021.

== Honours ==
- Cypriot Third Division:
  - Champions (1): 2020
- Cypriot Fourth Division:
  - Champions (3): 1987, 1991, 2007
