= Ethnikos Assia FC =

Cypriot football club

Ethnikos Assias
- Full name: Ethnikos Assia Football Club
- Founded: 16 March 1966; 59 years ago
- Ground: Makario Stadium
- Capacity: 16,000
- Chairman: Antonis Mavris
- Manager: Savvas Mangafas
- League: Third Division
- 2022–23: Third Division, 8th
Home colours	Away colours

Ethnikos Assia Football Club (Greek: Εθνικός 'Ασσιας) is a Cypriot football team currently playing in the Cypriot Second Division. The team was established in Assia, Famagusta, but since the Turkish invasion of 1974, Ethnikos became a refugee team. The club is now based in the capital Nicosia and play their home games at the Makario. The club has played three times in the first division, the last time was during the 2001–02 season.

== Achievements ==
- Cypriot Third Division Winners: 1

2011

- Cypriot Cup for lower divisions Winners: 1

2011
