= Onisilos Sotira 2014 =

Cypriot football club

- Full name: Onisilos Sotira 2014; Ονήσιλος Σωτήρας 2014
- Founded: 2014
- Dissolved: 2022
- Ground: Sotira Municipal Stadium, Sotira, Famagusta
- Capacity: 2,500
- Chairman: Yiannis Theophanous
- Manager: Michalis Markou
- 2021–22: Second Division, 12th
Home colours	Away colours

Onisilos Sotira 2014 was a Cypriot association football club based in Sotira, Famagusta, located in the Famagusta District. Its stadium was the Sotira Municipal Stadium. It has 2 participations in STOK Elite Division.

== History ==
Onisilos was founded in 2014 to replace the same-year dissolved club due to financial problems, Kentro Neon Onisilos Sotira. The name of the club comes from the Greek city-state of Salamis on the island of Cyprus, and Onesilus, who lived at the end of 5th century BC and at the beginning of 6th century BC and tried to liberate the island from Persians. The colours of the club were green and white. On 23 June 2022, the club merged with Achyronas Liopetriou to form Achyronas-Onisilos.

== Current squad ==
As of 31 January 2021

Note: Flags indicate national team as defined under FIFA eligibility rules; some limited exceptions apply. Players may hold more than one non-FIFA nationality.

No.	Pos.	Nation	Player
1	GK	(Angola) ANG	Carlos Peixoto
3	DF	(Cyprus) CYP	Zannetos Koumasis
4	DF	(Cyprus) CYP	Nicolas Toumbas
5	DF	(Cyprus) CYP	Nicolas Fotiou
6	MF	(Portugal) POR	Miguel Pires
7	MF	(France) FRA	Rayan Hiba
8	MF	(Cyprus) CYP	Andreas Koullouris
9	FW	(Cyprus) CYP	Marios Savva
10	FW	(Portugal) POR	Mário Gassamá
11	MF	(Croatia) CRO	Niko Havelka
13	MF	(Cyprus) CYP	Tziovanis Kastanou (Captain)

No.	Pos.	Nation	Player
21	MF	(Cyprus) CYP	Panayiotis Mavroudi (Vice captain)
22	MF	(Cyprus) CYP	Panayiotis Nicolaou
32	GK	(Cyprus) CYP	Gavriel Constantinou
33	FW	(Brazil) BRA	Vilmar Jr.
44	MF	(Cape Verde) CPV	Tony Correia
46	MF	(Cyprus) CYP	Modestos Soteriou
71	MF	(Cyprus) CYP	Andreas Constantinou
75	FW	(Portugal) POR	Zé Domingos
78	DF	(Cyprus) CYP	Vassilis Papageorgiou
88	MF	(Portugal) POR	Miguel Abreu
93	FW	(Cyprus) CYP	Nicos Pitsillides

For recent transfers, see List of Cypriot football transfers summer 2021.

== Honours ==
- Cypriot Third Division:

Winners (1): 2017–18

- STOK Elite Division:

Winners (1): 2016–17 (shared record)

- Cypriot Cup for lower divisions:

Winners (1): 2017–18 (shared record)
