= Chalkanoras Idaliou =

Cypriot football club

- Full name: Greek: Χαλκάνορας Ιδαλίου
- Founded: 1948; 78 years ago
- Ground: Chalkanoras Stadium, Dali
- Chairman: Andreas Ierodiakonou
- Manager: Andreas Kouloumbris
- League: Second Division
- 2025–26: Second Division, 9th of 16
Home colours	Away colours

Chalkanoras Idaliou (Greek: Χαλκάνορας Ιδαλίου) is a Cypriot football team currently playing in the Cypriot Second Division. The team was established in 1948 and is based in the village of Dali in Nicosia district. The club has played two seasons in the first division; in 1976–77 and 1977–78.

== Current squad ==
As of 15 September 2026

Note: Flags indicate national team as defined under FIFA eligibility rules; some limited exceptions apply. Players may hold more than one non-FIFA nationality.

No.	Pos.	Nation	Player
1	GK	CYP	Christos Askotis
3	DF	CYP	Iakovos Laos
6	MF	CYP	Ioannis Kosiis
7	DF	CYP	Andreas Giallouris
8	MF	SLE	Lawrence Panda
9	FW	NGR	Prince Ofire
10	MF	CYP	Vasilis Kourtidis (Captain)
13	DF	CYP	Louis Irodotou
17	MF	CYP	Andreas Christoforou
20	FW	CYP	Emilios Evagorou
21	GK	GRE	Panagiotis Doumis

No.	Pos.	Nation	Player
22	GK	CYP	Loukas Sakka
23	MF	CYP	Andreas Xynisteris
27	DF	CYP	Evripidis Pepis
35	FW	CYP	Issa Konstantinidis
42	MF	NGR	Christian Nnoruka
49	GK	CYP	Georgios Pelaselas
52	MF	POL	Ernest Słupski
55	DF	CYP	Angelis Angeli
65	FW	CYP	Sokratis Christou
—	DF	CGO	Baron Kibamba
—	FW	CYP	Elisseos Stylianou
—	MF	CYP	Filippos Kokkinoftas

For recent transfers, see List of Cypriot football transfers summer 2017.

== Achievements ==
- Cypriot Second Division Winners: 1

1976

- Cypriot Third Division Winners: 2

1999, 2010

- Cypriot Cup for lower divisions Winners: 1

2010
