= Ethnikos Latsion FC =

Cypriot football club

Ethnikos Latsion
- Full name: Ethnikos Latsion
- Founded: 1956; 70 years ago
- Ground: Latsia Municipal Stadium
- Chairman: Marios Antoniou
- Manager: Stelios Tsiaklis
- League: Third Division
- 2025–26: Second Division, 14th of 16 (relegated)
Home colours	Away colours

Ethnikos Latsion (Greek: Εθνικός Λατσιών) is a Cypriot association football club based in Latsia, located in the Nicosia District. Its stadium is the Latsia Municipal Stadium and its colours are blue and white. In 2009, Ethnikos Latsion was promoted to the Cypriot Fourth Division from the Cypriot Confederation of Local Federations, although they lost the playoff match against Dynamo Pervolion with 1–4, because of an objection made. They have won the 1994–95 Cypriot Third Division.

== Players ==
As of 6 April, 2026

Note: Flags indicate national team as defined under FIFA eligibility rules; some limited exceptions apply. Players may hold more than one non-FIFA nationality.

No.	Pos.	Nation	Player
2	DF	CYP	Sokratis Christodoulou
3	DF	GRE	Rafail Zaverdas
5	DF	CYP	Rafail Anastasiou
6	MF	CYP	Agapios Agapiou
7	FW	CYP	Giorgos Xenofontos
8	MF	CYP	Kyriakos Chrysomilis
9	FW	POL	Ernest Słupski
10	FW	CYP	Theodoros Papapanagiotou
11	FW	BRA	Vitor Venâncio
14	MF	CYP	Kyriakos Floridis
15	DF	NGA	Joseph Ogbonna
17	DF	CYP	Angelos Gavriel (on loan from Olympiakos Nicosia)
19	DF	GRE	Zacharias Venakis

No.	Pos.	Nation	Player
20	FW	CYP	Konstantinos Garcia
22	MF	ITA	Soulemane Ba
23	MF	GRE	Vangelis Theocharis
25	DF	CYP	Michalis Parlatas (on loan from Omonia 29M)
28	MF	MLI	Kissima Coulibaly
29	DF	CYP	Iraklis Mina
31	GK	CYP	Christoforos Vasiliou
32	GK	CYP	Michalis Papacharalampous
33	GK	CYP	Charalampos Petrou
39	FW	ENG	Luke Tunnah (on loan from Nea Salamis)
77	FW	NCA	Pablo Gállego
89	FW	CYP	Adonis Nikolettidis

== Sources ==
This article was based on the Greek-language article.
