= Digenis Akritas Morphou FC =

Cypriot sports club

Digenis Akritas Morphou
- Full name: Digenis Akritas Morphou
- Nickname: Φονέας των Γιγάντων (Killer of Giants)
- Founded: 23 April 1931; 95 years ago
- Ground: Morphou Municipal Stadium (original ground), Makario Stadium (using ground in exile), Nicosia
- Capacity: 16,000
- Manager: Christodoulos Christodoulou
- League: Second Division
- 2025–26: Second Division, 12th of 16
Home colours	Away colours

Digenis Akritas Morphou (Greek: Διγενής Ακρίτας Μόρφου) is a Cypriot sports club from Morphou, founded on 23 April 1931. The club takes its name from the medieval Greek hero Digenis Akritas, who is depicted on the club's emblem. It has a football and a basketball team.

As the club did not have access to a suitable stadium, the football team was not able to play in an official league of the Cyprus Football Federation until 1968, when it joined the second division. The team was promoted to the first division after the 1969–70 season. After finishing second in the Cypriot First Division in 1971, it qualified for the UEFA Cup competition, the first team from Cyprus to do this and was knocked out by AC Milan (lost 4–0 and 3–0) UEFA Cup 1971-72 under the Management of Costas Talianos. The club had a great following and was ranked within the strongest clubs in Cyprus before the Turkish invasion of Cyprus and occupation of the city of Morphou in 1974.

Following the Turkish invasion, the team was displaced to the southern part of the island, where they currently play in exile. This upheaval brought a downturn in fortunes, and the team loitered in the lower divisions until the 1999–2000 season, when they again earned promotion to the top division. 2005 also brought success in the Cypriot Cup, in which they reached the final of the competition only to lose 2–0 to Omonia Nicosia and finishing in 4th place in the Cyprus first division.

Digenis also has an active basketball team. They won the top division championship three times, in 1966, 1967 and 1968. last year the team won the 2nd division championship with an unbeaten record and were promoted back to division 1.

The 2018–19 season, restored some of the club's former glory as it won the 3rd division championship, returning to the 2nd tier of Cypriot football after 8 years, additionally the club did the double by winning the cup competition that the Cyprus Football federation runs for the lower divisions, closing this year with the "double".

The club is also reinstating its historic basketball team which will be competing in the 2nd division for the 2019–2020 season. Digenis Akritas Morphou is this year once again running academies for all age groups, under its new basketball team name, Digenis Akritas Morphou-B.C. The season 2021–2022 proved to be a remarkable, as the team stormed forward winning both the championship and cup of the 2nd division, with an amazing 26 wins out of 27 games, leading the team again to the 1st Division of Cyprus Basketball. 2025 marked the start of a new era for the clubs basketball team, as having won the championship in the Second Division, the team opted for its return to the First Division, after an absence of 21 years, a Division where the team historically belongs.

== History ==
Digenis Akritas Morphou is one of the oldest sport clubs in Cyprus. It was established on 23 April 1931 under the full name of "Mousikofilologikos ke Athlitikos Sillogos Digenis Akritas Morfou". The club started with 61 members but it soon reached 400. Its first executive panel comprised Stavros Geroudis, Christos Koumeras, Christos Sofroniou (Chamberlaine) Christakis Yiallourides, Pantelis Tsiapparis, Melis Hatzhiloizou, and Charalambos Odisseos. In addition to its athletic activities the club was very active in organizing cultural events in the area of Morphou. After its establishment Digenis sets up its first football team. Due to the absence of an appropriate stadium in Morphou the team could not enter the official league of the Cyprus Football Federation. In 1968, however, Digenis (along with the other football club from Morphou, AEM) is admitted in the Second Division. From its first year in the league Digenis shows its potentials by finishing in the second place (with Enosis Neon Paralimniou being the champions that year). The dream came true the following year. In the 1969–70 season Digenis became the champions and was promoted to the First Division. With Kostas Talianos being the manager, manages a great achievement from its first year in the First Division. Digenis rises up above the big teams of that time (APOEL, Omonoia, Anorthosis, AEL etc.) to finish up in the second place of the league (with Olympiakos being the champions). The greatest moment in the history of the club is written as Digenis participates in the UEFA cup and plays in "San Siro" stadium against the mighty A.C Milan (0–3).

Digenis Akritas Morphou is a Cypriot sports club from Morphou, founded on 23 April 1931. The club takes its name from the medieval Greek hero Digenis Akritas, depicted on the club's emblem, it has a basketball team. As the club did not have access to a suitable stadium, the football team was not able to play in an official league of the Cyprus Football Federation until 1968, when it joined the second division; the team was promoted to the first division after the 1969–70 season. After finishing second in the Cypriot First Division in 1971, it qualified for the UEFA Cup competition and was knocked out by AC Milan UEFA Cup 1971–72 under the Management of Noel McFarlane one of the Busby Babies of Manchester United; the club had a great following and was ranked within the strongest clubs in Cyprus before the Turkish invasion of Cyprus and occupation of the city of Morphou in 1974. Following the Turkish invasion, the team was displaced to the southern part of the island, where they play in exile; this upheaval brought a downturn in fortunes, the team loitered in the lower divisions until the 1999–2000 season, when they again earned promotion to the top division.

The golden era of Digenis soon came to an end. The Turkish invasion of Cyprus of 1974 and the subsequent occupation of the city of Morphou left Digenis with no home, no financial resources, and no stadium. Today, Digenis' home ground is the Makario Stadium, which has a 16,000-seat capacity. Its members and thousands of supporters are scattered all around Cyprus trying to start their lives from the beginning.

== Players ==
Digenis Akritas Morfou players 2022–2023 season

== Former managers ==
- Giorgos Savvidis (1999–2001)
- Marios Constantinou (2001–2005)
- Savvas Constantinou (2005–2007)
- Apostolos Makrides (2009–2010)
- Arsen Mihajlović (2009)
- Nedim Tutić (2010–2011)
- Stelios Stylianou (2010–2011)
- Arsen Mihajlović (2012–2013)
- Karapanos Nikos (2012–2013)
- Akis Apostolou (2013–2013)
- Costas Loizou (2013–2015)
- Stefanos Voskaridis (2017)
- Michail Eleftheriades (2018)
- Tasos Kyriakou (2020–2021)
- Goran Petkovski (2021)
- Epaminondas Christinakis (2021–2023)
- Dimitris Dimitriou (2023–2024)
- Nedim Tutić (2024–2025)
- Christodoulos Christodoulou (2025–)

== Honours ==
=== Football ===
- Cypriot First Division

Runner-up (1): 1970–71

- Cypriot Cup

Runner-up (1): 2004–05

- Cypriot Second Division

Winners (2): 1969–70, 1999–2000

- Cypriot Third Division

Winners (3): 1987–88, 2018–19, 2022–23 (record)

- Cypriot Cup for lower divisions

Winner (2): 2011–12, 2018–19 (record)

=== Basketball ===
- Cyprus Basketball Division A

Winners (2): 1966–67, 1967–68

- Cyprus Basketball Division B

Winners (3): 2001–02, 2008–09, 2021–2022 Cup Winners 2021–2022

== History in European competition ==
=== Overall ===
Competition	Pld	W	D	L	GF	GA	GD
UEFA Cup	2	0	0	2	0	7	−7
Total	2	0	0	2	0	7	–7

=== Matches ===
Season	Competition	Round1	Club	1st leg	2nd leg	Agg.
1971–72	UEFA Cup	1R	(Italy) Milan	0–4 (A)	0–3 (H) (Note: "Home" leg played at Stadio Giuseppe Grezar)	0–7
