= Kouris Erimis =

Cypriot football club

- Founded: 1966
- Ground: Erimi Community Stadium, Erimi
- Capacity: 1500
- League: Third Division
- 2022–23: Third Division, 13th

Kourris Erimis is a Cypriot football club based in Erimi, Cyprus. Founded in 1966 was playing 1 season in Second and 1 season in Fourth Division.

== Current squad ==
As of 21 December 2020

Note: Flags indicate national team as defined under FIFA eligibility rules; some limited exceptions apply. Players may hold more than one non-FIFA nationality.

No.	Pos.	Nation	Player
1	GK	(Cyprus) CYP	Dimitris Konstantinidis (goalkeeper)
3	DF	(Cyprus) CYP	Christoforos Frantzis
4	DF	(Cyprus) CYP	Andreas Chair
5	DF	(Cyprus) CYP	Alex Micheal
7	MF	(Cyprus) CYP	Christos Dimitriaids
8	MF	(Cyprus) CYP	Theodoros Andronikou
9	FW	(Cyprus) CYP	Andras Ioannou
11	FW	(Cyprus) CYP	Panagiotis Konstantinou
12	DF	(Cyprus) CYP	Nikos Panagidis
13	FW	(Cyprus) CYP	Charalampos Hatzicharalampous
17	DF	(Cyprus) CYP	Konstantinos Hatzittofis

No.	Pos.	Nation	Player
19	DF	(Nigeria) NGA	Eziamaka Collins Ikenna
20	FW	(Nigeria) NGA	Zest Owusu Banahene
21	DF	(Scotland) SCO	Connor Flynn Gillespie
22	DF	(Cyprus) CYP	Evagoras Antoniou
25	FW	(Cyprus) CYP	Savvas Nikolaou
26	DF	(Nigeria) NGA	Geraud Regis Nsele
30	MF	(Cyprus) CYP	Pantelis Kyriakou
31	FW	(Cyprus) CYP	Christos Paroutis
77	FW	(Cyprus) CYP	Marinos Evelthontos
96	MF	(Cyprus) CYP	Ioannis Pieri
397	FW	(Brazil) BRA	Lucas Da Silva

== Honours ==
- STOK Elite Division:

Winners (1): 2017–18 (shared record)
