= Olympias Lympion =

Cypriot football club

- Founded: 1941; 85 years ago
- Ground: Gipedo Olympias Lympion, Lympia
- Capacity: 1,000
- League: Third Division
- 2022–23: Second Division, 15th (relegated)

Olympias Lympion is a Cypriot football club based in Lympia, Cyprus. Founded in 1941, the club is currently competing in the 3rd tier of Cypriot football.
