= Akritas Chlorakas =

Cypriot football club

- Full name: Akritas Chlorakas
- Founded: 1971; 55 years ago
- Ground: Chloraka Municipal Stadium
- Capacity: 3,500
- Chairman: Liutauras Varanavicius
- Manager: Angelos Efthymiou
- League: Second Division
- 2025–26: First Division, 12th of 16 (relegated)
- Website: https://akritasfc.com/
Home colours	Away colours	Third colours

Akritas Chlorakas (Greek: Ακρίτας Χλώρακας) is a Cypriot professional football club based in Chloraka, Paphos. The club was founded in 1971 and currently plays in the Cypriot First Division. Akritas' colours are green and white, and they play their home games at the Chloraka Municipal Stadium. The club is owned by Lithuanian investor Liutauras Varanavičius.

== History ==
Founded in 1971, Akritas Chlorakas joined the Cyprus Football Association in 1973, competing in the Cypriot Third Division. For many years, Akritas fluctuated between the third and second division, winning the Third Division a total of three times, and winning the Cypriot Cup for Lower Divisions on one occasion.

Akritas Chlorakas finished third in the 2021-22 Cypriot Second Division, and was promoted to the First Division for the first time in the club's history. Despite some impressive results, including wins against Omonia, AEL, and Anorthosis (three times), Akritas finished in 13th place and was relegated in the 2022-23 season. In the 2024-25 season Akritas Chlorakas again finished in 3rd place and therefore were promoted for the second time in their history to top tier and returned after 2 years in Second Division.

== Current squad ==
As of 15 September 2026

Note: Flags indicate national team as defined under FIFA eligibility rules; some limited exceptions apply. Players may hold more than one non-FIFA nationality.

No.	Pos.	Nation	Player
2	DF	GHA	Benson Anang
4	DF	CYP	Stefanos Miller
5	DF	FRA	Hamed Dramé
6	MF	CYP	Andreas Frangos (on loan from Olympiakos Nicosia)
7	MF	POR	Matheus Clemente
8	MF	GRE	Michael Dellios
9	FW	GRE	Theocharis Pozatzidis
10	FW	GHA	Eric Appiah
11	MF	CYP	Marios Fasouliotis
14	MF	CYP	Andreas Asimenos
15	DF	CYP	Georgios Jokić Skafi (on loan from Pafos)
17	FW	CYP	Savvas Christodoulou (on loan from AEL Limassol)

No.	Pos.	Nation	Player
20	MF	CYP	Vasilis Demosthenous
22	MF	CYP	Pavlos Charidimou
24	DF	CYP	Kypros Christoforou
26	FW	CYP	Ioannis Chadjivasilis
30	DF	CYP	Giorgos Vasiliou
33	MF	CYP	Andreas Christou
79	FW	CYP	Andreas Konstantinou
88	GK	CYP	Leonidas Leonidou
90	GK	CYP	Ellinas Sofroniou
99	MF	EGY	Beter Nashed
—	DF	CYP	Fotis Kotsonis

=== Out on loan ===
Note: Flags indicate national team as defined under FIFA eligibility rules; some limited exceptions apply. Players may hold more than one non-FIFA nationality.

No.	Pos.	Nation	Player

== Club officials ==
=== Board of directors ===
Position	Staff
President	(Cyprus) Vasos Theodorou
Vice- President	(Cyprus) Andronikos Spyrou
Secretary	(Cyprus) Michalis Anastasiou
Academy Director	(Cyprus) Filippos Adamou
Members	(Cyprus) Konstantinos Papazosimas
Members	(Cyprus) Kypros Komodromos
Members	(Cyprus) Vasilis Charalampous

=== Technical and medical staff ===
Position	Staff
Team manager	(Cyprus) Themis Agathokleous
Technical director	(Cyprus) Fytos Kyriakou
Head coach	(Cyprus) Marios Nikolaou
1st Assistant coach	(Cyprus) Stelios Parpas
Goalkeeper coach	(Cyprus) Giwrgos Karakalides
Fitness coach	(Cyprus) Alexis Perikleous
Recovery coach	(Cyprus) Konstantinos Pachitis
Media Manager / Photographer	(Romania) Sonea Aurelian
Medical staff
Physiotherapist	(Cyprus) Giannos Ioannou

== Achievements ==
- Cypriot Third Division
  - Winners (3): 1976–77, 2008–09, 2015–16
- Cypriot Cup for Lower Divisions
  - Winners (1): 2014–15
