= List of football clubs in Cyprus =

The following list includes all the men's Association football clubs of Cyprus who are participating or have participated in the national championships of the country. As of the 2025-26 Season.

The national championships of Cyprus are the Cypriot First Division, the Cypriot Second Division, the Cypriot Third Division and the Cypriot Fourth Division which has been dissolved after 2014–15 season. The championships are run and organized by the Cyprus Football Association (CFA). Since 2015, National Championship is also the STOK Elite Division which is run and organized by the Confederation of local federations of Cyprus (STOK).

The following table is a list of Cypriot football clubs. For a complete list see Category:Football clubs in Cyprus.

== Clubs ==
Name	Location	District	Founded-Dissolved	Home Ground	2025-26 season	Highest level
AEZ Zakakiou	Limassol	Limassol District	1956-2026	Zakaki Community Stadium	Second Division	Cypriot First Division
AEK Kouklia	Kouklia	Paphos District	1968-2014 2014-	Kouklia Community Stadium	STOK Elite Division	Cypriot First Division
AEK Larnaca	Larnaca	Larnaca District	1994-	AEK Arena	First Division	Cypriot First Division
AEL Limassol	Limassol	Limassol District	1930-	Alphamega Stadium	First Division	Cypriot First Division
AEP Paphos	Paphos	Paphos District	2000-2014	Stelios Kyriakides Stadium	Does not exist	Cypriot First Division
Ayia Napa FC	Ayia Napa	Famagusta District	1990-	Ayia Napa Municipal Stadium	Second Division	Cypriot First Division
Akritas Chlorakas	Chloraka	Paphos District	1971-	Stelios Kyriakides Stadium	First Division	Cypriot First Division
Alki Larnaca	Larnaca	Larnaca District	1948-2014, 2024-	Neo GSZ Stadium	STOK Elite Division	Cypriot First Division
Alki Oroklini	Oroklini	Larnaca District	1979-2023	Ammochostos Stadium	Does not exist	Cypriot First Division
PAC Omonia 29M	Nicosia	Nicosia District	2018-	Katokopia Stadium	Second Division	Cypriot First Division
Anagennisi Deryneia	Deryneia	Famagusta District	1920-	Anagennisi Deryneia Stadium	Second Division	Cypriot First Division
Anorthosis Famagusta	Famagusta^{1}	Famagusta District	1911-	Antonis Papadopoulos Stadium	First Division	Cypriot First Division
APEP Pitsillia	Kyperounta	Limassol District	1979-	Kyperounta Community Stadium	STOK Elite Division	Cypriot First Division
APOEL Nicosia	Nicosia	Nicosia District	1926-	GSP Stadium	First Division	Cypriot First Division
Apollon Limassol	Limassol	Limassol District	1954-	Alphamega Stadium	First Division	Cypriot First Division
APOP Kinyras Peyias	Pegeia	Paphos District	2003-2012	Peyia Municipal Stadium	Does not exist	Cypriot First Division
APOP Paphos	Paphos	Paphos District	1953-2000	Stelios Kyriakides Stadium	Does not exist	Cypriot First Division
Aris Limassol	Limassol	Limassol District	1930-	Alphamega Stadium	First Division	Cypriot First Division
ASIL Lysi	Lysi	Famagusta District	1932-	Grigoris Afxentiou Stadium	Second Division	Cypriot First Division
Atromitos Yeroskipou	Geroskipou	Paphos District	1956-2013	Geroskipou Municipal Stadium	Does not exist	Cypriot First Division
AYMA Nicosia	Nicosia	Nicosia District	1934-	Unknown	Amateur league	Cypriot First Division
Digenis Akritas Morphou	Morphou	Nicosia District	1931-	THOI Lakatamia Stadium	Second Division	Cypriot First Division
Doxa Katokopias	Katokopia	Nicosia District	1954-	Katokopia Stadium	Second Division	Cypriot First Division
Ethnikos Assia	Assia	Famagusta District	1966-	PAEEK Keryneia-Epistrophi Stadium	Third Division	Cypriot First Division
Ethnikos Achna	Achna	Famagusta District	1968-	Dasaki Stadium	First Division	Cypriot First Division
EN THOI Lakatamia	Lakatamia	Nicosia District	1948-	THOI Lakatamia Stadium	Third Division	Cypriot First Division
Enosis Neon Paralimniou	Paralimni	Famagusta District	1936-	Tasos Markou Stadium	First Division	Cypriot First Division
Enosis Neon Trust	Nicosia	Nicosia District	1924-1938	Old GSP Stadium	Does not exist	Cypriot First Division
EPA Larnaca	Larnaca	Larnaca District	1932-1994	Neo GSZ Stadium	Does not exist	Cypriot First Division
Ermis Aradippou	Aradippou	Larnaca District	1958-	Aradippou Municipal Stadium	Third Division	Cypriot First Division
Evagoras Paphos	Paphos	Paphos District	1961-2000	Stelios Kyriakides Stadium	Does not exist	Cypriot First Division
Karmiotissa Pano Polemidion	Pano Polemidia	Limassol District	1979-	Pano Polemidia Municipal Stadium	Second Division	Cypriot First Division
Keravnos Strovolou	Strovolos	Nicosia District	1926-1993	Keravnos Strovolou Stadium	Does not exist	Cypriot First Division
Krasava ENY Ypsonas FC	Ypsonas	Limassol District	2014-	Ammochostos Stadium	First Division	Cypriot Second Division
Nea Salamina Famagusta	Famagusta	Famagusta District	1948-	Ammochostos Stadium	Second Division	Cypriot First Division
Othellos Athienou FC	Athienou	Larnaca District	1933-	Othellos Athienou Stadium	Third Division	Cypriot First Division
Olympiakos Nicosia	Nicosia	Nicosia District	1931-	GSP Stadium	First Division	Cypriot First Division
Omonia Aradippou	Aradippou	Larnaca District	1929-	Antonis Papadopoulos Stadium	First Division	Cypriot First Division
Omonia Nicosia	Nicosia	Nicosia District	1948-	GSP Stadium	First Division	Cypriot First Division
Onisilos Sotira	Sotira, Famagusta	Famagusta District	1978-2014	Sotira Community Stadium	Does not exist	Cypriot First Division
Orfeas Nicosia	Nicosia	Nicosia District	1948-	Orfeas Stadium	STOK Elite Division	Cypriot First Division
PAEEK	Kyrenia	Kyrenia District	1953-	PAEEK Keryneia-Epistrophi Stadium	Second Division	Cypriot First Division
Pafos FC	Paphos	Paphos District	2014-	Stelios Kyriakides Stadium	First Division	Cypriot First Division
Pezoporikos Larnaca	Larnaca	Larnaca District	1924-1994	Neo GSZ Stadium	Does not exist	Cypriot First Division
Çetinkaya Türk S.K.	Nicosia	Nicosia District	1930-	Old GSP Stadium	Withdrew from CFA^{2}	Cypriot First Division
Chalkanoras Idaliou	Dali	Nicosia District	1948-	Chalkanoras Stadium	Second Division	Cypriot First Division
Adonis Idaliou	Dali	Nicosia District	1956-	Adonis Idaliou Stadium	Local championship (POEL)	Cypriot Second Division
AEK Ammochostos	Famagusta	Famagusta District	1959-1980	GSE Stadium	Does not exist	Cypriot Second Division
AEK Kakopetrias	Kakopetria	Nicosia District	1984-Unknown	Kakopetria Community Stadium	Does not exist	Cypriot Second Division
AEK/Achilleas Ayiou Theraponta	Katholiki, Limassol	Limassol District	1997-2005	AEK Katholiki Stadium	Does not exist	Cypriot Second Division
AEM Mesogis	Mesogi	Paphos District	1985-2007	Giolou Community Stadium	Does not exist	Cypriot Second Division
AEM Morphou	Morphou/Limassol	Nicosia District	1960-1991	Morphou Municipal Stadium	Does not exist	Cypriot Second Division
Amathus Limassol	Limassol	Limassol District	Unknown-1965	Old GSO Stadium	Does not exist	Cypriot Second Division
Anagennisi Germasogeias	Germasogeia	Limassol District	1956-	Anagennisi Germasogeia Stadium	Local championships (PAAOK)	Cypriot Second Division
Anagennisi Larnacas	Larnaca	Larnaca District	1945-Unknown	Unknown	Does not exist	Cypriot Second Division
Antaeus Limassol	Limassol	Limassol District	1943-1963	Old GSO Stadium	Does not exist	Cypriot Second Division
APEA	Akrotiri	Limassol District	1955-	Akrotiri Community Stadium	Second Division	Cypriot Second Division
APEP Pelendriou	Pelendri	Limassol District	1956-	Pelendri Community Stadium	Local championships (EPOL)	Cypriot Second Division
Apollon Athienou	Athienou	Larnaca District	1958-1972	Unknown	Does not exist	Cypriot Second Division
Apollon Lympion	Lympia	Nicosia District	1948-	Apollon Lympion Stadium	Local championship (APOESP)	Cypriot Second Division
Arion Lemesou	Limassol	Limassol District	Unknown-1970	Old GSO Stadium	Does not exist	Cypriot Second Division
Achilleas Kaimakliou	Kaimakli	Nicosia District	1943-1988	Kaimakli Community Stadium	Does not exist	Cypriot Second Division
Achyronas Liopetriou	Liopetri	Famagusta District	1960-2022	Liopetri Community Stadium	Does not exist	Cypriot Second Division
Digenis Akritas Ipsona	Ypsonas	Limassol District	1958-2014	Stelios Chari Stadium	Does not exist	
Digenis Oroklinis	Oroklini	Larnaca District	1983-	Voroklini Community Stadium	Local Championship(EPEL-OPN SEK-POEPA)	Cypriot Second Division
Ethnikos Asteras Limassol	Limassol	Limassol District	1957-1977	Old GSO Stadium	Does not exist	Cypriot Second Division
Ethnikos Defteras	Deftera	Nicosia District	1948-	Leventeio Stadium	Local championships (EPOPL)	Cypriot Second Division
Ethnikos Latsion	Latsia	Nicosia District	1956-	Katokopia Stadium	Second Division	Cypriot Second Division
Elpida Xylofagou	Xylofagou	Larnaca District	1959-	Michalonikion Stadium	Local championships (POAL)	Cypriot Second Division
ENAD Polis Chrysochous	Polis Chrysochous	Paphos District	1994-2024	Polis Municipal Stadium	Does not exit	Cypriot Second Division
ENAD Ayiou Dometiou	Ayios Dhometios	Nicosia District	1937-2023	Agios Dometios Municipal Stadium	Local championships (APOESP)	Cypriot Second Division
Enosis Neon Parekklisia	Parekklisia	Limassol District	2006-2017	Pareklisia Community Stadium	Does not exist	Cypriot Second Division
Enosis Agion Omologiton	Ayioi Omoloyites, Nicosia	Nicosia District	1944-1961	Old GSP Stadium	Does not exist	Cypriot Second Division
Enosis Kokkinotrimithia	Kokkinotrimithia	Nicosia District	1968-2016	Kokkinotrimithia Community Stadium	Does not exist	Cypriot Second Division
Enosis Panelliniou-Antaeus Limassol	Limassol	Limassol District	1963-1971	Old GSO Stadium	Does not exist	Cypriot Second Division
ENY	Ypsonas	Limassol District	2005-2025	Erimi Community Stadium	Does not exist	Cypriot Second Division
EPAL Limassol	Limassol	Limassol District	1963-1971	Old GSO Stadium	Does not exist	Cypriot Second Division
Iraklis Gerolakkou	Gerolakkos	Nicosia District	1948-	PAEEK Keryneia-Epistrofi Stadium	Second Division	Cypriot Second Division
Gaydzak Nicosia	Nicosia	Nicosia District	1957-1968	Old GSP Staadium	Does not exist	Cypriot Second Division
Gençlik Gücü T.S.K.	Nicosia	Nicosia District	1952-	Old GSP Stadium	Withdrew from CFA^{2}	Cypriot Second Division
KN Maroniton	Limassol	Limassol District	1977-Unknown	Unknown	Does not exist	Cypriot Second Division
Kinyras Empas	Empa, Cyprus	Paphos District	1983-2003	Unknown	Does not exist	Cypriot Second Division
Kouris Erimis	Erimi	Limassol District	1966-	Erimi Community Stadium	Third Division	Cypriot Second Division
LALL Lysi	Lysi^{1}	Famagusta District	1919-1974	Grigoris Afxentiou Stadium	Does not exist	Cypriot Second Division
MEAP Nisou	Pera Chorio-Nisou	Nicosia District	1980-	Theodorio Community Stadium	Second Division	Cypriot Second Division
Neos Aionas Trikomou	Trikomo	Famagusta District	1900-1992	Trikomo Community Stadium	Does not exist	Cypriot Second Division
Nikos & Sokratis Erimis	Erimi	Limassol District	1956-2016	Erimi Community Stadium	Does not exist	Cypriot Second Division
Gençler Birliği S.K.	Larnaca	Larnaca District	1934-	Unknown	Withdrew from CFA^{2}	Cypriot Second Division
Doğan Türk Birliği	Limassol	Limassol District	1938-	Unknown	Withdrew from CFA^{2}	Cypriot Second Division
Olympias Lympion	Lympia	Nicosia District	1944-	Olympias Lympion Stadium	Local championships (POEL)	Cypriot Second Division
Othellos Famagusta	Famagusta	Famagusta District	Unknown-1963	GSE Stadium	Does not exist	Cypriot Second Division
Olympos Xylofagou	Xylofagou	Larnaca District	1952-2022	Makario Sporting Centre	Local championships (EPEL)	Cypriot Second Division
Omonia Psevda	Psevdas	Larnaca District	1969-	Psevda Community Stadium	Third Division	Cypriot Second Division
Onisilos Sotira 2014	Sotira, Famagusta	Famagusta District	2014-2022	Sotira Community Stadium	Does not exist	Cypriot Second Division
Orfeas Athienou	Athienou	Larnaca District	1948-	Orfeas Athienou Stadium	Local championships (EPEL)	Cypriot Second Division
Panellinios Limassol	Limassol	Limassol District	1953-1963	Old GSO Stadium	Does not exist	Cypriot Second Division
Parthenon Zodeia	Kato Zodeia	Nicosia District	1966-1979	Kato Zodeia Stadium	Does not exist	Cypriot Second Division
Peyia 2014	Pegeia	Paphos District	2014-2025	Peyia Municipal Stadium	Does not exist	Cypriot Second Division
P.O. Xylotymbou 2006	Xylotymbou	Larnaca District	2006-2024	P.O. Xylotymbou Stadium	Does not exist	Cypriot Second Division
Rotsidis Mammari	Mammari	Nicosia District	1961-	Rotsidis Mammari Stadium	Local championships (EPOPL)	Cypriot Second Division
SEK Agiou Athanasiou	Agios Athanasios, Cyprus	Limassol District	1948-	SEK Agiou Athanasiou Stadium	Local championships (PAAOK)	Cypriot Second Division
Spartakos Kitiou	Kiti, Cyprus	Larnaca District	1958-	Dromolaxia Community Stadium	Second Division	Cypriot Second Division
Mağusa Türk Gücü S.K.	Famagusta	Famagusta District	1945-	Unknown	Withdrew from CFA^{2}	Cypriot Second Division
Frenaros FC 2000	Frenaros	Famagusta District	2000-	Frenaros Community Stadium	Local championships (POAL)	Cypriot Second Division
FC Episkopi	Episkopi, Limassol	Limassol District	2003-2011	Episkopi Community Stadium	Does not exist	Cypriot Third Division
FC Leivadia 2022	Leivadia	Larnaca District	2022-	Agia Paraskevi Community Stadium	Third Division	Cypriot Third Division
AEK Katholiki	Katholiki, Limassol	Limassol District	1981-2019	AEK Katholiki Stadium	Does not exist	Cypriot Third Division
AEK Karava	Karavas^{1}	Kyrenia District	1957-1974	GS Praxandros Stadium	Does not exist	Cypriot Third Division
AEK Kythreas	Kythrea^{1}	Nicosia District	1950-2020	Aglandjia Community Stadium	Does not exist	Cypriot Third Division
AEN Ayiou Georgiou Vrysoullon-Acheritou	Vrysoulles	Famagusta District	2004-	Vrysoulles Community Stadium	Third Division	Cypriot Third Division
AEPP	Pano Polemidia	Limassol District	2012-	Pano Polemidia Municipal Stadium	Third Division	Cypriot Third Division
Amathus Ayiou Tychona	Agios Tychonas	Limassol District	1955-	Agios Tychonas Community Stadium	Local championships (PAAOK)	Cypriot Third Division
AMEP Parekklisia	Parekklisia	Limassol District	1961-2022	Pareklisia Community Stadium	Does not exist	Cypriot Third Division
Anagennisi Trachoni	Trachoni, Limassol	Limassol District	1979-	Anagennisi Trachoniou Community Stadium	Local championships (EPOL)	Cypriot Third Division
Anorthosis Mouttagiakas	Mouttagiaka	Limassol District	1989-	Germasogeia Municipal Stadium	Third Division	Cypriot Third Division
APEAN Ayia Napa	Ayia Napa	Famagusta District	Unknown-1990	Ayia Napa Municipal Stadium	Does not exist	Cypriot Third Division
APEY Ypsona	Ypsonas	Limassol District	1950-2002	Stelios Chari Stadium	Does not exist	Cypriot Third Division
APONA Anageia	Anageia	Nicosia District	1956-	Anageia-Deftera Community Stadium	Third Division	Cypriot Third Division
APOP Polis Chrysochous	Polis Chrysochous	Paphos District	2024-	Polis Municipal Stadium	STOK Elite Division	Cypriot Third Division
ASO Ormideia	Ormideia	Larnaca District	1956-Unknown	Ormideia Community Stadium	Does not exist	Cypriot Third Division
ASOB Vatili	Vatili^{1}	Famagusta District	1939-1977	Vatili Community Stadium	Does not exist	Cypriot Third Division
Aspis Pylas	Pyla	Larnaca District	1957-	Pyla Community Stadium	Third Division	Cypriot Third Division
ATE-PEK Ergaton	Ergates	Nicosia District	1939-	ATE-PEK Ergaton Stadium	Local championships (EPOPL)	Cypriot Third Division
Atlas Aglandjias	Aglandjia	Nicosia District	1938-	Aglandjia Community Stadium	ThirdDivision	Cypriot Third Division
Geroskipou FC	Geroskipou	Paphos District	2013-	Geroskipou Municipal Stadium	STOK Elite Division	Cypriot Third Division
Doxa Paliometochou	Paliometocho	Nicosia District	1960-	Doxa Paliometochou Stadium	STOK Elite Division	Cypriot Third Division
Dynamo Pervolion	Pervolia	Larnaca District	1960-	Pervolia Community Stadium	Local championships (EPEL)	Cypriot Third Division
Elia Lythrodonta	Lythrodontas	Nicosia District	1939-2023	Elia Lythrodontas Stadium	Does not exist	Cypriot Third Division
Ellinismos Akakiou	Akaki, Cyprus	Nicosia District	1924-	Ellinismos Akakiou Stadium	Local championships (APOESP)	Cypriot Third Division
Elpida Astromeriti	Astromeritis	Nicosia District	2009-	Doxa Paliometochou Stadium	Local championships (APOESP)	Cypriot Third Division
ENAZ Agia Zoni Limassol	Agia Zoni, Limassol	Limassol District	Unknown	Old GSO Stadium	Does not exist	Cypriot Third Division
THOI Avgorou	Avgorou	Famagusta District	1954-2016	Avgorou Community Stadium	Does not exist	Cypriot Third Division
Kedros	Agia Marina (Skylloura)	Nicosia District	1967-	Kedros Agias Marinas Stadium	Third Division	Cypriot Third Division
Kissos FC	Kissonerga	Paphos District	2007-2014	Kissonerga Community Stadium	Does not exist	Cypriot Third Division
Konstantios & Evripidis Trachoniou	Trachoni, Limassol	Limassol District	1966-2018	Trachoni Community Stadium	Does not exist	Cypriot Third Division
Kinyras Empas	Empa	Paphos District	1983-2003	Does not exist	Cypriot Third Division	
Livadiakos Livadion	Livadia, Larnaca	Larnaca District	1971-2010	Agia Paraskevi Community Stadium	Does not exist	Cypriot Third Division
Livadiakos/Salamina Livadion	Livadia, Larnaca	Larnaca District	2010-2018	Agia Paraskevi Community Stadium	Does not exist	Cypriot Third Division
Livanos Kormakiti	Kormakitis^{1}	Kyrenia District	1948-1989	Unknown	Does not exist	Cypriot Third Division
O Kormakitis	Kormakitis	Kyrenia District	1989-	Kokkinotrimithia Community Stadium	Local championships (EPOPL)	Cypriot Third Division
Olimpiada Neapolis	Yenişehir, Nicosia	Nicosia District	1951-Unknown	Unknown	Does not exist	Cypriot Third Division
P.O. Ormideia	Ormideia	Larnaca District	2006-	Ormideia Community Stadium	Third Division	Cypriot Third Division
OXEN Peristeronas	Peristerona	Nicosia District	1950-2022	OXEN Peristerona Stadium	Does not exist	Cypriot Third Division
PEFO Olympiakos	Limassol	Limassol District	1997-Unknown	Unknown	Does not exist	Cypriot Third Division
POL/AE Maroni	Maroni	Larnaca District	2008-2012	Maroni community Stadium	Does not exist	Cypriot Third Division
Poseidonas Larnacas	Larnaca	Larnaca District	1975-Unknown	Unknown	Does not exist	Cypriot Third Division
Sourouklis Troullon	Troulloi	Larnaca District	1972-2015	Troulloi Community Stadium	Does not exist	Cypriot Third Division
Tsaggaris Peledriou	Pelendri	Limassol District	1957-2015	Pelendri Community Stadium	Does not exist	Cypriot Third Division
Faros Acropoleos	Akropoli, Nicosia	Nicosia District	1961-Unknown	Unknown	Does not exist	Cypriot Third Division
Foinikas Agias Marinas Chrysochous	Agia Marina Chrysochous	Paphos District	1973-2024	Agias Marinas Chrysochous Community Stadium	Does not exist	Cypriot Third Division
Fotiakos Frenarou	Frenaros	Famagusta District	1942-2000	Frenaros Community Stadium	Does not exist	Cypriot Third Division
Adonis Geroskipou	Geroskipou	Paphos District	1965-1992	Geroskipou Municipal Stadium	Does not exist	Cypriot Fourth Division
A.O. Avgorou	Avgorou	Famagusta District	2018-	Avgorou Community Stadium	STOK Elite Division	Cypriot Fourth Division; STOK Elite Division
A.O. Thyella Agiou Theodorou	Agios Theodoros, Larnaca	Larnaca District	1926-	Agios Theodoros Community Stadium	STOK Elite Division	Cypriot Fourth Division; STOK Elite Division
AEK Korakou	Korakou	Nicosia District	1999-	Korakou Community Stadium	STOK Elite Division	Cypriot Fourth Division; STOK Elite Division
AEK Kornos	Kornos, Cyprus	Larnaca District	1968-2013	Kornos Community Stadium	Does not exist	Cypriot Fourth Division
AMEAN Agiou Nikolaou	Agios Nikolaos, Limassol	Limassol District	1943-1993	Aetos Stadium	Does not exist	Cypriot Fourth Division
AMEK Kapsalou	Kapsalos, Limassol	Limassol District	1956-2008	Unknown	Does not exist	Cypriot Fourth Division
Anagennisi Lythrodonta	Lythrodontas	Nicosia District	1944-	Anagennisi Lythrodontas Stadium	Local championships (POEL)	Cypriot Fourth Division
Anagennisi Mouttalou	Mouttalos, Paphos	Paphos District	1976-1995	Mouttalos Community Stadium	Does not exist	Cypriot Fourth Division
Anagennisi Prosfigon Ayiou Antoniou Lemesou	Ayios Antonis, Limassol	Limassol District	1975-2024	Aetos Stadium	Does not exist	Cypriot Fourth Division
Anorthosis Kato Polemidia	Kato Polemidia	Limassol District	1940-	Doxa Polemidion Stadium	Local championships (PAAOK)	Cypriot Fourth Division
AOL–Omonia Lakatamias	Lakatamia	Nicosia District	1985-	AOL-Omonia Lakatmia Stadium	Local championships (POEL)	Cypriot Fourth Division
Apollon Geriou	Geri	Nicosia District	1938-	Latsia-Geri Community Stadium	Local championships (POEL)	Cypriot Fourth Division; STOK Elite Division
APOP Palechoriou	Palaichori	Nicosia District	1957-	Michalakis Karaolis Stadium	Local championships (EPOPL)	Cypriot Fourth Division
AS Mandrion	Mandria	Paphos District	2012-	Kouklia Community Stadium	STOK Elite Division	Cypriot Fourth Division; STOK Elite Division
ATE-PEK Parekklisias	Parekklisia	Limassol District	1967-	Pareklisia Community Stadium	Local championships (PAAOK)	Cypriot Fourth Division
Achilleas Ayiou Theraponta	Agios Therapon	Limassol District	1947-1997	Unknown	Does not exist	Cypriot Fourth Division
Dafni Troulloi	Troulloi	Larnaca District	1952-2015	Troulli Community Stadium	Does not exist	Cypriot Fourth Division
Digenis Agiou Nikolaou	Agios Nikolaos, Limassol	Limassol District	1982-Unknown	Unknown	Does not exist	Cypriot Fourth Division
Doxa Deftera	Deftera	Nicosia District	1968-	Anageia-Deftera community Stadium	Local championships (POEL)	Cypriot Fourth Division
Doxa Polemidion	Kato Polemidia	Limassol District	1958-	Doxa Polemidion Stadium	Local championships (EPOL)	Cypriot Fourth Division
EAS Ayios Dhometios	Ayios Dhometios	Nicosia District	1948-2016	Agios Dometios community Stadium	Does not exist	Cypriot Fourth Division
ETHA Engomis	Engomi	Nicosia District	1942-Unknown	Engomi Municipal Stadium	Does not exist	Cypriot Fourth Division
Ethnikos Empas	Empa	Paphos District	Unknown	Unknown	Does not exist	Cypriot Fourth Division
Elpida Liopetriou	Liopetri	Famagusta District	1948-	Liopetri Community Stadium	Local championships (POAL)	Cypriot Fourth Division
Elpida Prosfigon Paphou	Paphos	Paphos District	Unknown-1995	Mouttalos Community Stadium	Does not exist	Cypriot Fourth Division
Enosis Neon Ayia Napa	Ayia Napa	Famagusta District	Unknown-1990	Ayia Napa Municipal Stadium	Does not exist	Cypriot Fourth Division
ENAP Paphos	Paphos	Paphos District	1991-Unknown	Mouttalos Community Stadium	Does not exist	Cypriot Fourth Division
Evagoras Avgorou	Avgorou	Famagusta District	1938-	Avgorou Community Stadium	Local championships (POAL)	Cypriot Fourth Division
Evagoras Amiandos	Amiantos	Limassol District	1957-Unknown	Unknown	Does not exist	Cypriot Fourth Division
Evagoras Pallikarides Agion Trimithias	Agioi Trimithias	Nicosia District	1997-	Paliometocho Community Stadium	Local championships (EPOPL)	Cypriot Fourth Division
Zenonas Larnaca	Larnaca	Larnaca District	Unknown	Unknown	Does not exist	Cypriot Fourth Division
H Akanthou	Akanthou	Famagusta District	1986-	THOI Lakatamia Stadium	Local championships (APOESP)	Cypriot Fourth Division; STOK Elite Division
THOI/AEK Leivadion	Leivadia	Larnaca District	2013-2022	Agia Paraskevi Community Stadium	Does not exist	Cypriot Fourth Division; STOK Elite Division
THOI Filias	Fyllia	Nicosia District	1952-Unknown	Unknown	Does not exist	Cypriot Fourth Division
THOI Pyrgou	Pyrgos, Limassol	Limassol District	1980-	Pyrgos Community Stadium	Local championships (PAAOK)	Cypriot Fourth Division; STOK Elite Division
Thiella Dromolaxia	Dromolaxia	Larnaca District	1959-	Dromolaxia Community Stadium	Local Championship(EPEL-OPN SEK-POEPA)	Cypriot Fourth Division
Kedros Kormakiti	Kormakitis	Kyrenia District	1972-1989	Unknown	Does not exist	Cypriot Fourth Division
Kentro Neotitas Kalou Choriou "Commandaria"	Kalo Chorio, Limassol	Limassol District	1979-1998	Kalo Chorio Community Stadium	Does not exist	Cypriot Fourth Division
Kimonas Xylotympou	Xylotymbou	Larnaca District	1925-2006	Xylotimbou Community Stadium	Does not exist	Cypriot Fourth Division
Kissos Kissonerga	Kissonerga	Paphos District	1990-	Kissonerga Community Stadium	Local championships (POASP)	Cypriot Fourth Division
Kornos FC 2013	Kornos, Cyprus	Larnaca District	2013-	Kornos Community Stadium	STOK Elite Division	STOK Elite Division
Kourio Episkopi	Episkopi, Limassol	Limassol District	1948-	Episkopi Community Stadium	Local championships (EPOL)	Cypriot Fourth Division
Lenas Lemesou	Limassol	Limassol District	1961-	Aetos Stadium	Local championships (PAAOK)	Cypriot Fourth Division; STOK Elite Division
Marathonas Kato Varosha	Varosha, Famagusta^{1}	Famagusta District	1948-Unknown	Unknown	Does not exist	Cypriot Fourth Division
Morfotikos Tymbou	Tymbou^{1}	Nicosia District	1959-Unknown	Unknown	Does not exist	Cypriot Fourth Division
Olympias Frenarou FC	Frenaros	Famagusta District	1940-2000	Frenaros Community Stadium	Does not exist	Cypriot Fourth Division
Olympos Acheritou	Acheritou	Famagusta District	1959-2004	Vrysoulles Community Stadium	Does not exist	Cypriot Fourth Division
Omonia Ormideia	Ormideia	Larnaca District	1956-	Ormideia Community Stadium	Local championships (EPEL-OPN SEK-POEPA)	Cypriot Fourth Division
P&S Zakakiou	Zakaki	Limassol District	1959-	Zakaki Community Stadium	Local championships (PAAOK)	Cypriot Fourth Division
Panikos Pourgouridis Lemesou	Limassol	Limassol District	1981-Unknown	Unknown	Does not exist	Cypriot Fourth Division
PAOK Kalou Choriou	Kalo Chorio, Limassol	Limassol District	1998-Unknown	Kalo Chorio Community Stadium	Does not exist	Cypriot Fourth Division
PAOK Klirou	Klirou	Nicosia District	1971-	Mitsero Community Stadium	Local championships (POEL)	Cypriot Fourth Division
Parideio Drosias	Larnaca	Larnaca District	1983-Unknown	Unknown	Does not exist	Cypriot Fourth Division
Parnassos Strovolou	Strovolos	Nicosia District	1957-Unknown	Keravnos Strovolou Stadium	Does not exist	Cypriot Fourth Division
Poseidonas Giolou	Giolou	Paphos District	1970-	Giolou Community Stadium	Local championships (POASP)	Cypriot Fourth Division; STOK Elite Division
Proodos Kaimakliou	Kaimakli	Nicosia District	1941-	Voriou polou Stadium	Local championships (POEL)	Cypriot Fourth Division
Salamina Dromolaxias	Dromolaxia	Larnaca District	1979-Unknown	Dromolaxia Community Stadium	Does not exist	Cypriot Fourth Division
Triptolemus Evrychou	Evrychou	Nicosia District	1937-	Solea Middles School Stadium	Local championships (PAO)	Cypriot Fourth Division
Xylofagou FC	Xylofagou	Famagusta District	2022-	Makario Sports Centre	STOK Elite Division	STOK Elite Division
Agapinoras/Kinisi	Paphos	Paphos District	Unknown-Unknown	Mouttalos Community Stadium	Does not exist	POASP Regional Legaue
AEGEE Paphos	Paphos	Paphos District	Unknown-Unknown	Unknown	Does not exist	POASP Regional League
Aetos Agias Marinoudas	Agia Marinouda	Paphos District	Unknown-Unknown	Unknown	Does not exist	POASP Regional Legaue
Aetos Paphou	Paphos	Paphos District	Unknown-Unknown	Unknown	Does not exist	POASP Regional Legaue
AE Ampelitis	Statos-Agios Fotios	Paphos District	2008-	Statou-Agios Photis Community Stadium	Local championships (POASP)	POASP Regional League
AEG Geroskipou	Geroskipou	Paphos District	1992-2014	Geroskipou Municipal Stadium	Does not exist	POASP Regional League
AEK Kissonerga	Kissonerga	Paphos District	Unknown-Unknown	Kissonerga Community Stadium	Does not exist	POASP Regional Legaue
AEK Koilis	Koili	Paphos District	Unknown-2013	Koili Community Stadium	Does not exist	POASP Regional League
AEN Empas	Empas	Paphos District	Unknown-Unknown	Sportivo	Does not exist	POASP Regional League
AEN Timis	Timi	Paphos District	Unknown-2023	Timi community Stadium	Does not exist	POASP Regional League
AEN Chlorakas	Chloraka	Paphos District	Unknown-Unknown	Chloraka Municipal Stadium	Does not exist	POASP Regional League
A.E.P. Panagias	Pano Panagia	Paphos District	2014-2019	Statos-Agios photios Community Stadium	Doies not exist	POASP Regional League
A.E.P. Pomou	Pomos	Paphos District	1991-2014	Agia Marina Chrysochous Community Stadium	Does not exist	POASP Regional League
Akamas Polis Chrysochous	Polis Chrysochous	Paphos District	Unknown-1994	Polis Municipal Stadium	Does not exist	POASP Regional League
Akritas Chlorakas B' 2015	Chlorakas	Paphos District	2015-	Chlorakas Municipal Stadium	Local championships (POASP)	POASP Regional League
Anagennisi Paphou	Mouttalos, Paphos	Paphos District	1976-1995	Mouttalos Community Stadium	Does not exist	POASP Regional League
APE Agias Marinoudas	Agia Marinouda	Paphos District	Unknown-Unknown	Unknown	Does not exist	POASP Regional Legaue
APE/Aetos Agias Marinoudas	Agia Marinouda	Paphos District	Unknown-Unknown	Unknown	Does not exist	POASP Regional Legaue
A.P.E.M.M	Statos-Agios Fotios	Paphos District	2024-	Tala Community Stadium	Local championships (POASP)	POASP Regional League
APO Chrysomilia Agiou Amvrosiou Keryneias	Mouttalos, Paphos	Paphos District	2009-	Mouttalos Community Stadium	Local championships (POASP)	POASP Regional League
APOEL Paphou	Paphos	Paphos District	Unknown-Unknown	Unknown	Does not exist	POASP Regional League
APOP Geroskipou	Armou	Paphos District	2020-2024	Geroskipou Municipal Stadium	Does not exist	POASP Regional Legaue
APOP Lempas	Lempa	Paphos District	2013-2015	Tala Community Stadium	Does not exist	POASP Regional League
APOP Pegeia	Pegeia	Paphos District	1982-2003	Does not exist	Unknown	POASP Regional League
Aris Polemiou	Polemi	Paphos District	1954-Unknown	Unknown	Does not exist	POASP Regional Legaue
Armou FC	Armou	Paphos District	1983-	Sportivo	Local championships (POASP)	POASP Regional Legaue
Arsinoe Polis Chrysochous	Polis Chrysochous	Paphos District	Unknown-Unknown	Unknown	Does not exist	POASP Regional Legaue
AS Anaritas	Anarita	Paphos District	2006-	Local championships (POASP)	POASP Regional League	
Astir	Chlorakas	Paphos District	Unknown-1971	Unknown	Does not exist	POASP Regional League
Aphroditi Geroskipou	Geroskipou	Paphos District	2015-2024	Geroskipou Municipal Stadium	Does not exist	POASP Regional Legaue
Dias Geroskipou	Geroskipou	Paphos District	Unknown-1992	Unknown	Does not exist	POASP Regional League
Digenis Akritas	Chlorakas	Paphos District	Unknown-1971	Unknown	Does not exist	POASP Regional League
Dimitrakis Argakas	Argaka	Paphos District	Unknown-1994	Unknown	Does not exist	POASP Regional Legaue
Dikefalos Theletras	Theletra	Paphos District	1989-2018	Giolou Community Stadium	Does not exist	POASP Regional Legaue
Elpida Prosfigon Paphou	Mouttalos, Paphos	Paphos District	Unknown-1995	Mouttalos Community Stadium	Local championships (POASP)	POASP Regional League
THOI Fos Geroskipou	Geroskipou	Paphos District	Unknown-1965	Unknown	Does not exist	POASP Regional League
Thyella Paphos	Paphos	Paphos District	Unknown-Unknown	Unknown	Does not exist	POASP Regional League
Thyella Salamious	Salamiou	Paphos District	Unknown-Unknown	Does not exist	Unknown	POASP Regional Legaue
KN Agias Marinas	Agia Marina	Paphos District	Unknown-Unknown	Unknown	Does not exist	POASP Regional Legaue
KN Armou	Armou	Paphos District	1983-Unknown	Unknown	Does not exist	POASP Regional Legaue
KN Evagoras Pallikaridis Tsadas	Tsada	Paphos District	1978-2021	Olympiko Stadium	Does not exist	POASP Regional Legaue
KN Peristeronas	Peristerona, Chrysochous	Paphos District	Unknown-Unknown	Unknown	Does not exist	POASP Regional Legaue
Keravnos Pomou	Pomos	Paphos District	Unknown-1963	Unknown	Does not exist	POASP Regional Legaue
KN Empas	Empa	Paphos District	2022-	Tala Community Stadium	Local championships (POASP)	POASP Regional Legaue
Mandria FC	Mandria	Paphos District	2014-2016	Mandria Community Stadium	Does not exist	POASP Regional League
Miltiadis Talas	Tala	Paphos District	1971-	Tala Community Stadium	Local championships (POASP)	POASP Regional League
Mixahl Nikolaou Mesogis	Mesogi	Paphos District	Unknown-Unknown	Unknown	Does not exist	POASP Regional Legaue
PAOK Kissonergas	Kissonerga	Paphos District	2009-2013	Kissonerga Community Stadium	Does not exist	POASP Regional League
Papaflessas Geroskipou	Geroskipou	Paphos District	Unknown-1992	Unknown	Does not exist	POASP Regional League
PAS Asteras Paphou	Paphos	Paphos District	2011-2017	Marakana	Does not exist	POASP Regional League
PAS Kato Pyrgos Tyllirias	Kato Pyrgos, Nicosia	Nicosia District	Unknown-2015	Kato Pyrgos Community Stadium	Does not exist	POASP Regional League
PAS Peyia	Pegeia	Paphos District	2011-14	Peyia Municipal Stadium	Does not exist	POASP Regional League
PAS Foinikas Gialias	Gialia	Paphos District	2010-2020	Agia Marina Chrysochosu Community Stadium	Local championships (POASP)	POASP Regional League
PAS Choletrion	Choletra	Paphos District	Unknown-Unknown	Unknown	Does not exist	POASP Regional League
Peyia FC 2012	Pegeia	Paphos District	2012-2014	Peyia Municipal Stadium	Does not exist	POASP Regional League
Prasini Thyella Pegeias	Pegeia	Paphos District	Unknown-Unknown	Unknown	Does not exist	POASP Regional League
Promitheas Mouttalou	Mouttalos, Paphos	Paphos District	1989-2021	Mouttalos Community Stadium	Does not exist	POASP Regional League
Proodeutikos paphou	Paphos	Paphos District	1984-Unknown	Unknown	Does not exist	POASP Regional League
Pyrsos Empas	Empa	Paphos District	Unknown-Unknown	Unknown	Does not exist	POASP Regional League
ST. Georges FC	Agios Gerogios, Pegeia	Paphos District	2010-2022	Peyia Municipal Stadium	Does not exist	POASP Regional League
FC Promitheas Mouttalou	Mouttalos, Paphos	Paphos District	2012-2014	Mouttalos Community Stadium	Does not exist	POASP Regional League
Paphos Warriors FC	Empa	Paphos District	2011-2012	Sportivo	Does not exist	POASP Regional League

Legend:

- Name: The clubs are listed under their present name. In some cases, some teams used a different name in previous years while they were participating in the national championships.
- Location: The location where the club resides. The location of the refugee clubs is indicated as it was before the Turkish invasion of Cyprus.
- District: Cyprus is divided in six districts. The location of each club belongs to one of these six districts.
- Founded-Dissolved: The period of existence of the club (founding date and dissolution date). The word "unknown" is indicated for the clubs which there is no any data about their existence. For clubs that are still exist is no dissolution date is indicated.
- 2025–26 season: The league in which the club is participating in the 2025–26 season.
- Highest level: The highest level of the Cypriot football league system in which the club has ever participated.

Notes:

^{1}The refugee clubs location (clubs which before 1974 were located in the areas that are occupied by the Turkish army after the Turkish invasion of Cyprus) is indicated as it was before 1974.

^{2}The Turkish Cypriot teams withdrew from Cypriot football in 1955.

== See also ==
- Football in Cyprus
- Cypriot First Division
- Cypriot Second Division
- Cypriot Third Division
- Cypriot Fourth Division
- Cypriot Cup

== Sources ==
https://www.cfa.com.cy/Gr/news/51391

== Bibliography ==
- Gavreilides, Michalis; Papamoiseos, Stelios (2001). Ένας αιώνας Κυπριακό ποδόσφαιρο [One century Cypriot football] (in Greek). Nicosia: The writer. ISBN 9963-8720-1-8.
- Meletiou, Giorgos (2011). Κυπριακό ποδόσφαιρο 1900–1960 [Cypriot Football 1900–1960] (in Greek). Nicosia: Power Publishing. ISBN 978-9963-688-87-6.
- Παπαμωυσέως, Στέλιος (2013). Από την ενοποίηση... στ΄ αστέρια (Κυπριακό ποδόσφαιρο 1953-2013). Λευκωσία: Ο Συγγραφέας. pp. 162–163.
- Papamoiseos, Stelios (2013). Από την ενοποίηση... στα αστέρια [From unification... to the stars] (in Greek). Nicosia: The writer. pp. 154–155.
