= Empa, Cyprus =

Empa
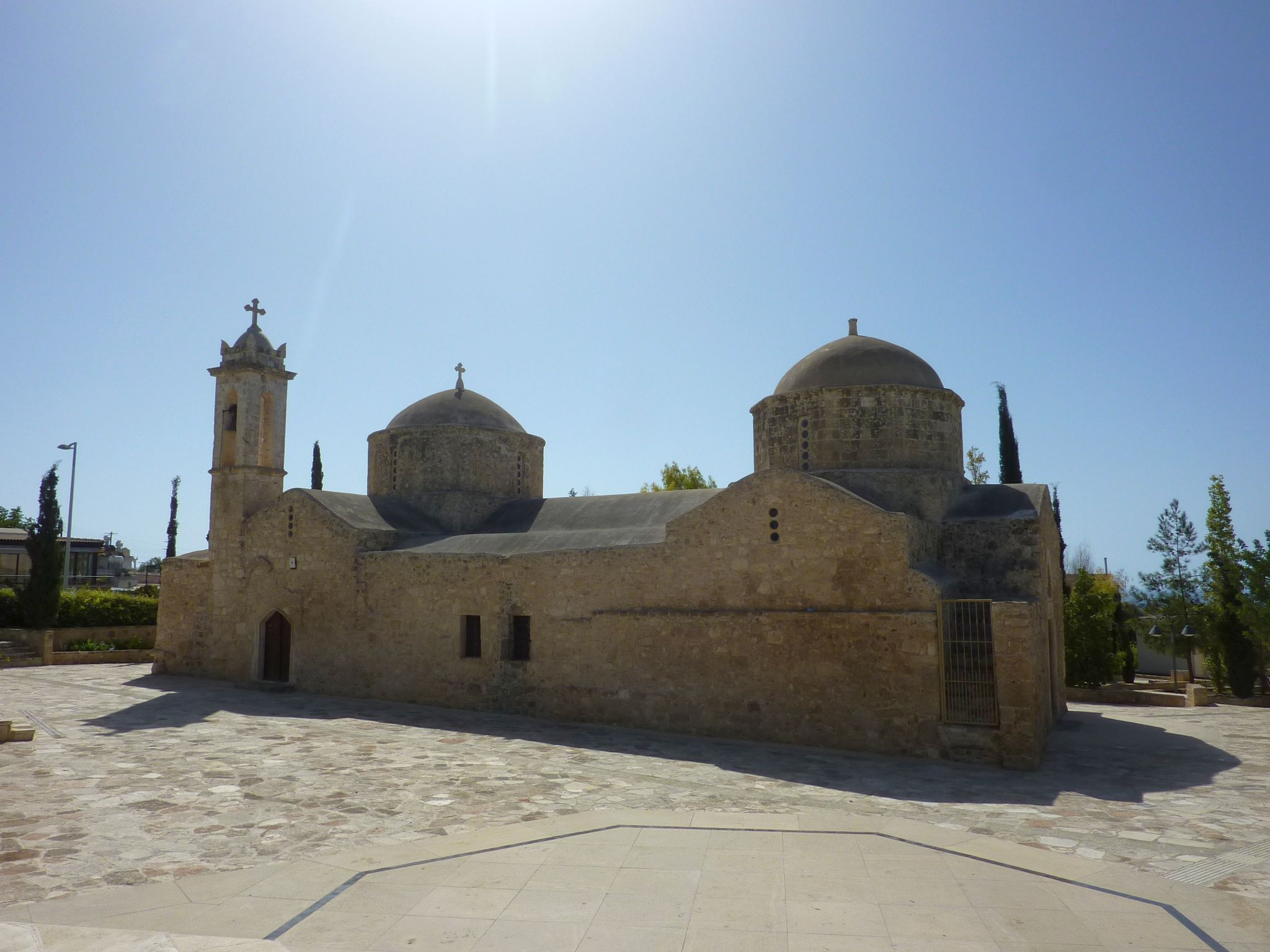
- Panagia Chryseleousa

- Location within Cyprus
- Coordinates: 34°48′N 32°25′E
- Country: Cyprus
- District: Paphos District

Population (2011)
  - Total: 4,855

Empa (Greek: Έμπα) is one of the largest villages in Paphos, Cyprus. It is spread over a wide area and not only borders Paphos but also the villages of Chlorakas, Kissonerga, Tala, Tremithousa and Mesogi. It has a population of more than 4,000 people.

== History ==
The village already existed by the Byzantine era and it is known from the Frankish period with the same name. The 15th century Cypriot historian Leontios Machairas in his Chronicle, par. 129, mentions a visit of the King of Cyprus, Peter I (1359–1369), quoting "...and the king went hunting and reached Emba towards Paphos...".

Louis de Mas Latrie includes the village both amongst those that belonged to the family of the king of Cyprus during the period of Frankish rule, and as one of the king's villages that cultivated sugarcane. During 1468 the village had fallen under the region of Chrysochous, under the regional law officer (bailliage).

== Etymology ==
The appellation of the village is purely Greek, belonging to the Cypriot dialect. In this dialect Emba means "enter". It is possible that the name of the village was given because it is built at the entrance of Paphos, that is the edges of the city, through which the travellers from the north, northwest and west came in. Another version mentions that the name was given to the village because it is situated near the coast from where people departed from or arrived to Cyprus by sea, during the Byzantine era or even later during the period of Frankish rule. It is mentioned that King Peter I departed for Europe from the area in 1362. The village is noted as 'Emba' in medieval maps.

== Monuments ==
The ancient church of Panayia Chryseleoussis is in the community. Built in the 12th century in Byzantine Rhythm, it literally embellishes the village square. Almost all the walls in the interior of the church are covered with frescoes. Certain of them are priceless for their religious and historical value, such as that of Pantokratoros and that of Saint George that are next to the pulpit and which date from around the 13th century. Also to be appreciated is the fretworked gold plated iconostasis from the 16th of century which is adorned with ancient pictures of Jesus, the Virgin Mary and Saint John Precursor. In the church is also found a Gospel from the 16th century, which was printed in Venice. Thousands of tourists visit the church each year to admire its architecture and the wonders it contains.

There are also a number of chapels in Emba such as the Byzantine chapel dedicated to Saint George (in the vicinity of Petridia), the cave chapel of Saint Limbros (also at Petridia), and the new chapel dedicated to Saint Charalambos. At Petridia in former times there was also the church of Saint Akakios built on land which was a dependency of the Monastery of Stavros at the village of Omodos. The other chapels of Emba now in ruins are the following: the Chapel of Saint Eleftherios, the Chapel of All Saints (Ayioi Pantes), the Chapel of Timios Prodromos, the Chapel of Saint Sofronios, the Chapel of Saint Mercurios, the Chapel of the Five Saints (Ayioi Pente): Efstratios, Afxentios, Evgenios, Mardarios, Orestis), the Chapel of Saint Paraskevi, and the Cave of Saint Kournoutas at Petridia.

Recently a new church was constructed near the old one; it was dedicated to the apostle Andreas (St. Andrew) and on his name day, 30 November, a religious festival is held on the church grounds.

== Economy ==
Emba has a few shops and tavernas dotted along the narrow winding road that runs through the village. In the evening the local men can be seen sitting outside their local coffee shops and often spilling out onto the narrow roads on their wooden chairs.

== Personalities ==
Outstanding personalities of the village of Emba include the Bishop Anthimos of Irinoupolis (situated then in Baghdad, Iraq) who was born at the village of Emba and died in 1791, Nikolas Solomonides who was the private secretary of the Dragoman of Cyprus Hadjigeorgakis Kornesios, but also a poet and an intellectual, his brother Andreas Solomonides who was a nobleman and was employed at the Ottoman Court (seraglio) in Nicosia and thus saved the church of Emba from being destroyed by the Ottomans, but also the villagers of Emba from paying taxes to them after 1821. They both lived during the end of the 18th century and early 19th century. Another outstanding personality from Emba was Father Christodoulos (1816), a great priest of the village.
