= Artemidos Avenue =

Road from Larnaca to Larnaca Airport

Artemidos Avenue
- Οδός Αρτέμιδος
- Artemidos Avenue in Red

Route information
- Length: 4 km (2.5 mi)

Major junctions
- From: Larnaca Municipal Theatre
- Larnaca International Airport
- To: Dromolaxia

Location
- Country: Cyprus
- Regions: Larnaca District
- Major cities: Larnaca

Highway system
- Motorways and roads in Cyprus
← B3	→ B5

Artemidos Avenue is a road which links the centre of Larnaca, from the municipal theatre, to Larnaca International Airport, before ending in the small town of Dromolaxia, where it connects to several local roads. It is a 4 lane urban road, having 4 at-grade roundabouts, some traffic lights, and numerous at-grade intersections.

== Major Junctions ==
No.	Area	Connections	Type
1	Municipal Area	Leonida Kioupi, Louki Pieridi, Stadiou	Roundabout
2	Faneromenis	Faneromenis Avenue	Crossroad
3	Larnaca	Okkular	T Junction
4	Larnaca	Kotza Tepe	T Junction
5	Mackenzie	Piale Pasa	T Junction
6	Larnaca International (Old)	Service Roads	Roundabout
7	Larnaca International (New)	Service Roads	Roundabout
8	Larnaca International (New)	Dromolaxia - Airport Road	T Junction
9	Larnaca International (New)	A3 highway logo	Roundabout
10	Dromolaxia	Archepiskopou Makarios III	One Way Crossroad
11	Dromolaxia	Eleftherias	Fork

== Naming and Classification ==
Artemidos Avenue (along with other local roads) is officially called the B4, and is labelled as such on many maps. Some signs along Artemidos Avenue label the B4 as the A4, however it is labelled in the same style and color as the B roads.
