= Tremithousa =

Tremithousa Τρεμιθούσα
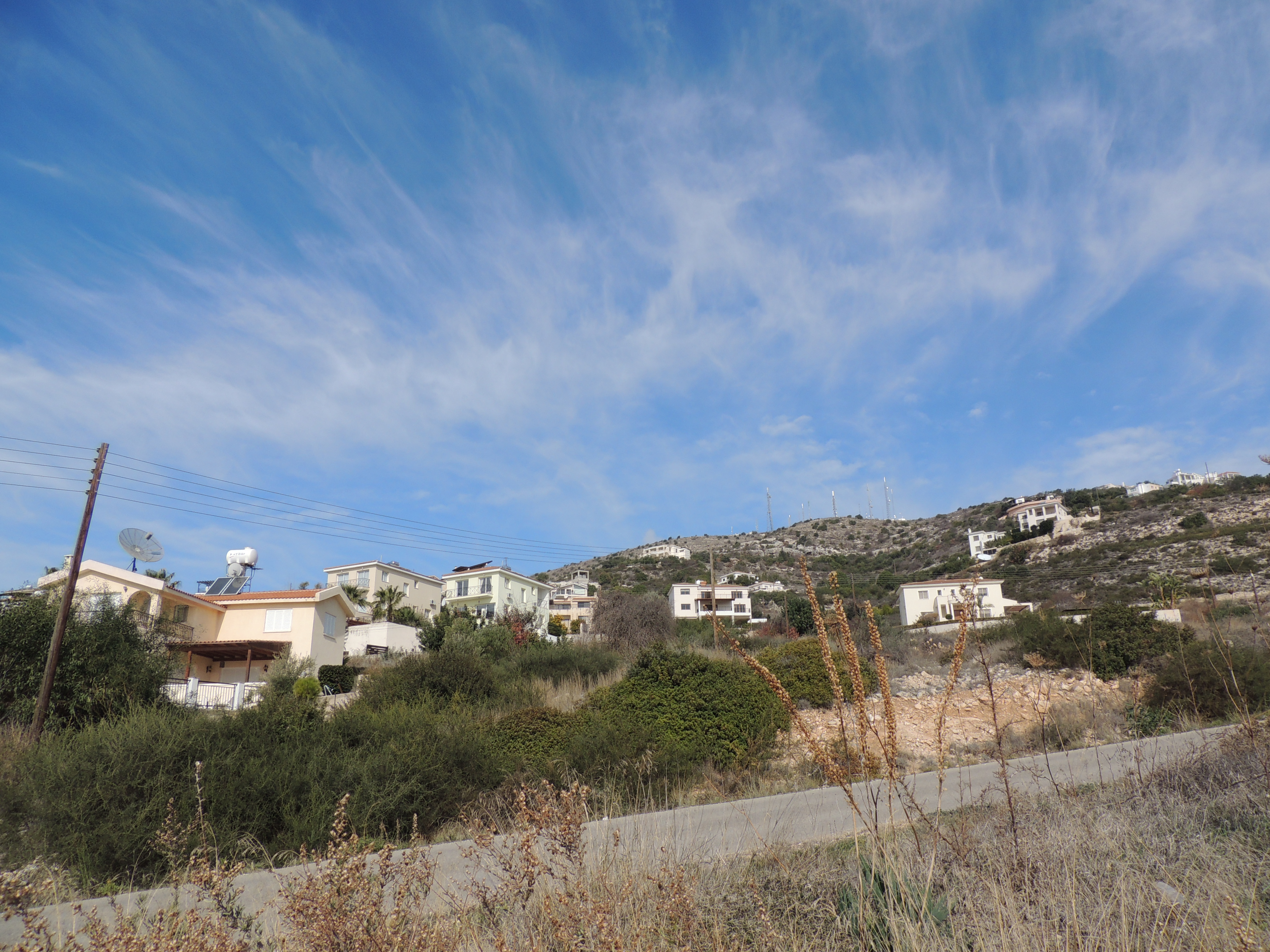

- Location in Cyprus
- Coordinates: 34°49′1″N 32°26′49″E
- Country: Cyprus
- District: Paphos District

Government
  - Type: Community Council
- Elevation: 294 m (965 ft)

Population (2011)
  - Total: 1,041
- Time zone: UTC+2 (EET)
  - Summer (DST): UTC+3 (EEST)
- Postal code: 6023
- Website: https://tremithousa.org/en/

Tremithousa (Greek: Τρεμιθούσα Πάφου) is a village in the Paphos District of Cyprus, located 7 km north of Paphos. Tremithousa is located 294 m above sea level. Tremithousa is located near Mesa Chorio and Mesogi Village. Tremithousa receives an average annual rainfall of about 520 millimeters; vines of winemaking varieties, vegetables, cereals, forage plants, citrus, almond, and walnut trees, and legumes are cultivated in the region. The village has a reputation for the honey that it produces. Tremithousa connects in the north to the monastery of Agios Neofytos, in the northeast with the village of Tala, and in the east with the main road of Tsada – Polis.

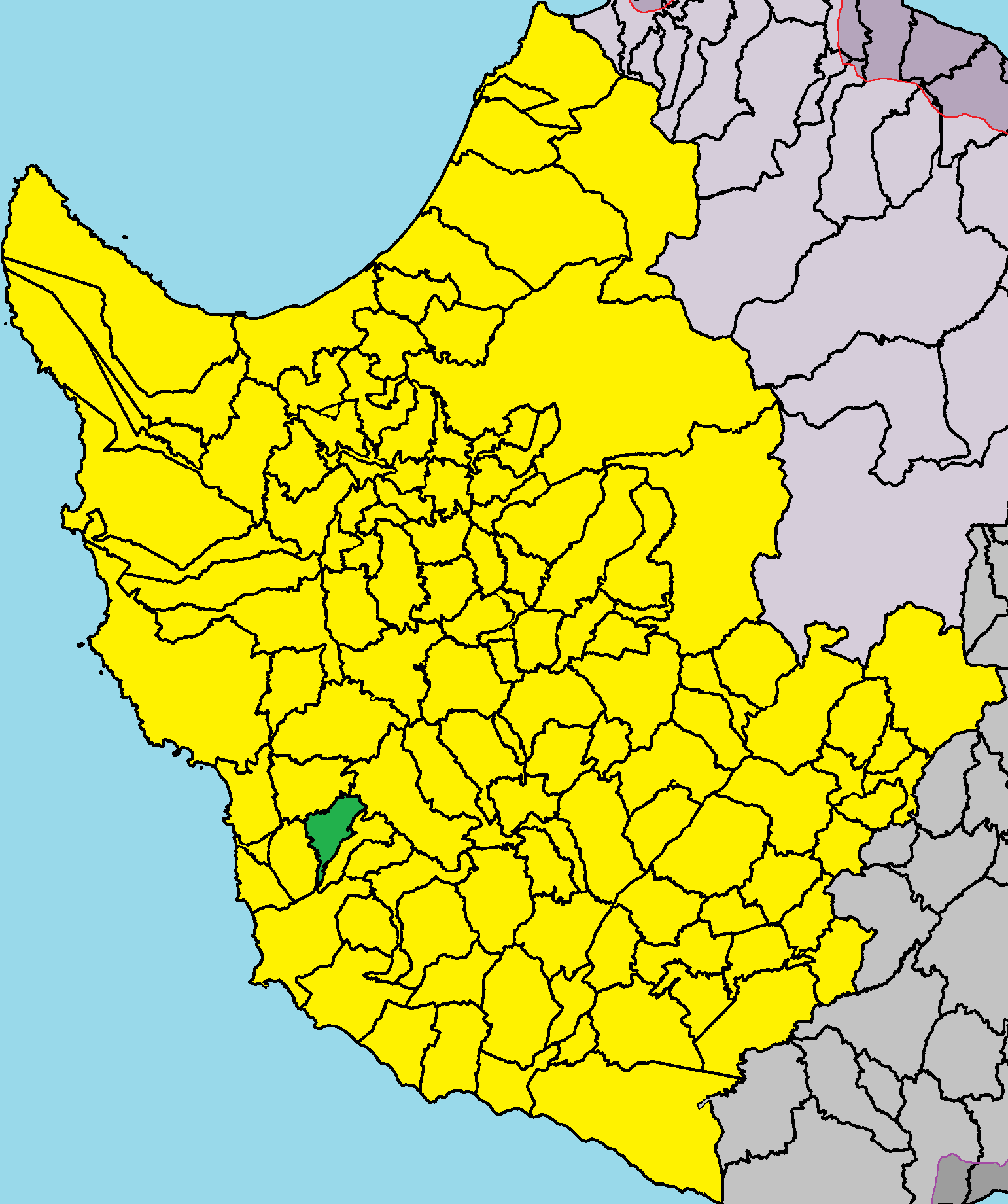
The location of Tremithousa within the District of Paphos.

== Topography ==
The small traditional village, located between mountain and sea at an altitude of 280 meters, offers panoramic views of the surrounding area.

Tremithousa, is about 3 kilometers northwest of the city of Pafos. The village is built at an average altitude of 270 meters. Its area has a general inclination from the northeast to the southwest and the altitude ranges from 150 to 500 meters. Tremithousa receives an average annual rainfall of about 520 millimeters.

With respect to transportation Tremithousa connects in the north to the monastery of Agios Neofytos, in the northeast with the village of Tala, and in the east with the main road of Pafos – Polis.

== Etymology ==
Tremithousa took its name because of the “Tremithia”. Tremithia (Terebinth: Pistacia terebinthus) is a tree that was found in large quantities in the surrounding area. Thus the name Tremithousa implies an area that is filled with Terebinth trees. Indeed, in the old times the village was known for its production of “Pafitiki Pissa” (gum of Pafos) (Cypriot Greek: Παφίτικη Πίσσα), which is made out of the resin of the Terebinth tree. Also in the old years with the traditional mills grind the fruit of the tremithia and produced the traditional oil, which was used by all the families. Several residents used it for therapeutic purposes.

== Demographics ==
The village, because of the small distance between it and the city of Pafos, has undergone great fluctuations of its population. In 1881 the inhabitants of Tremithousa numbered 156, which increased to 196 in 1891, to 227 in 1901, and to 260 in 1911. In 1921 the inhabitants numbered 298, 317 in 1931, 374 in 1946, and 418 in 1960. In 1973 the inhabitants of Tremithousa were 424. In 1976 the inhabitants decreased to 421 and in 1982 to 369. In the 2001 census the inhabitants numbered 700. Today is 1300.

== History ==
The village existed during the Medieval years and -during the era of Frank domination, administratively it belonged to the village of Empa. It probably is the village that was granted in 1375 -along with others -to Tibaldi Belfarang by King Peter II of Cyprus as a reward for the services he offered in the war against the Genoese.
