= 2013–14 Cypriot Cup for lower divisions =

Tournament details
- Country: Cyprus
- Dates: 30 October 2013 – 6 April 2014
- Teams: 18

Final positions
- Champions: Adonis (1st title)
- Runners-up: Elpida X.

The 2013–14 Cypriot Cup for lower divisions was the 6th edition of the Cypriot Cup for lower divisions. A total of 18 clubs entered the competition. It began on 30 October 2012 with the first round and concluded on 6 April 2014 with the final which was held at Dasaki Stadium. Adonis Idaliou won their 1st cup trophy after beating Elpida Xylofagou 2–0 in the final.

== Format ==
Only teams from the Cypriot Third Division and Cypriot Fourth Division could participate. Participation was not compulsory. 18 of 29 participated that season.

The competition consisted of five rounds. In the first and in the second round each tie was played as a single leg and was held at the home ground of one of the two teams, according to the draw results. Each tie winner was qualifying to the next round. If a match was drawn, extra time was following. If extra time was drawn, there was a replay at the ground of the team who were away for the first game. If the rematch was also drawn, then extra time was following and if the match remained drawn after extra time the winner was decided by penalty shoot-out.

The next two rounds were played in a two-legged format, each team playing a home and an away match against their opponent. The team which scored more goals on aggregate, was qualifying to the next round. If the two teams scored the same number of goals on aggregate, then the team which scored more goals away from home was advancing to the next round.

If both teams had scored the same number of home and away goals, then extra time was following after the end of the second leg match. If during the extra thirty minutes both teams had managed to score, but they had scored the same number of goals, then the team who scored the away goals was advancing to the next round (i.e. the team which was playing away). If there weren't scored any goals during extra time, the qualifying team was determined by penalty shoot-out.

The final was a single match.

== First round ==
14 out of the 18 teams were drawn to qualify directly to the second round, without needing to play any match.

Team 1	Result	Team 2
(C) ENTHOI Lakatamia FC	3 - 0	MEAP Nisou (C)
(D) Iraklis Gerolakkou	3 - 1	Kissos FC Kissonergas (D)

== Second round ==
Team 1	Result	Team 2
(C) Adonis Idaliou	5 - 1	Iraklis Gerolakkou (D)
(C) Akritas Chlorakas	4 - 2	Ethnikos Assia F.C. (C)
(C) Digenis Akritas Morphou	0 - 1	Foinikas Ayias Marinas (C)
(D) Digenis Akritas Ipsona	2 - 1	Olympias Lympion (D)
(D) Elpida Astromeriti	1 - 0	ENTHOI Lakatamia FC (C)
(C) Elpida Xylofagou	3 - 1 (aet.)	Konstantios & Euripidis (C)
(C) ENAD Polis Chrysochous FC	1 - 0	Achyronas Liopetriou (C)
(D) OXEN Peristeronas	1 - 2	Ormideia FC (C)

== Quarter-finals ==
Team 1	Agg.	Team 2	1st leg	2nd leg
(C) Akritas Chlorakas	7 - 0	Digenis Akritas Ipsona (D)	2 - 0	5 - 0
(C) Adonis Idaliou	(a.) 2 - 2	Elpida Astromeriti (D)	1 - 0	1 - 2
(C) Ormideia FC	1 - 0	ENAD Polis Chrysochous (C)	0 - 0	1 - 0
(C) Finikas Ayias Marinas	2 - 7	Elpida Xylofagou (C)	1 - 2	1 - 5

== Semi-finals ==
Team 1	Agg.	Team 2	1st leg	2nd leg
(C) Adonis Idaliou	(a.) 2 - 2	Ormideia FC (C)	0 - 0	2 - 2
(C) Akritas Chlorakas	4 - 1	Elpida Xylofagou (C)	0 - 0	1 - 2

== Final ==
6 April 2014

Adonis Idaliou	2 – 0	Elpida Xylofagou
Karaolis 17'; Anastasiou 90'	(Report)

Dasaki Stadium, Achna
Attendance: 1,400
Referee: Neofytos Neofytou

Cypriot Cup for lower divisions 2013–14 Winners
Adonis Idaliou
1st Title

== Sources ==
- "Cyprus 2012/13". Rec.Sport.Soccer Statistics Foundation. 2016-01-14.
- Official website (in Greek)

== See also ==
- Cypriot Cup for lower divisions
- 2013–14 Cypriot Third Division
- 2013–14 Cypriot Fourth Division
