= Mesa Chorio =

Mesa Chorio Μέσα Χωριό
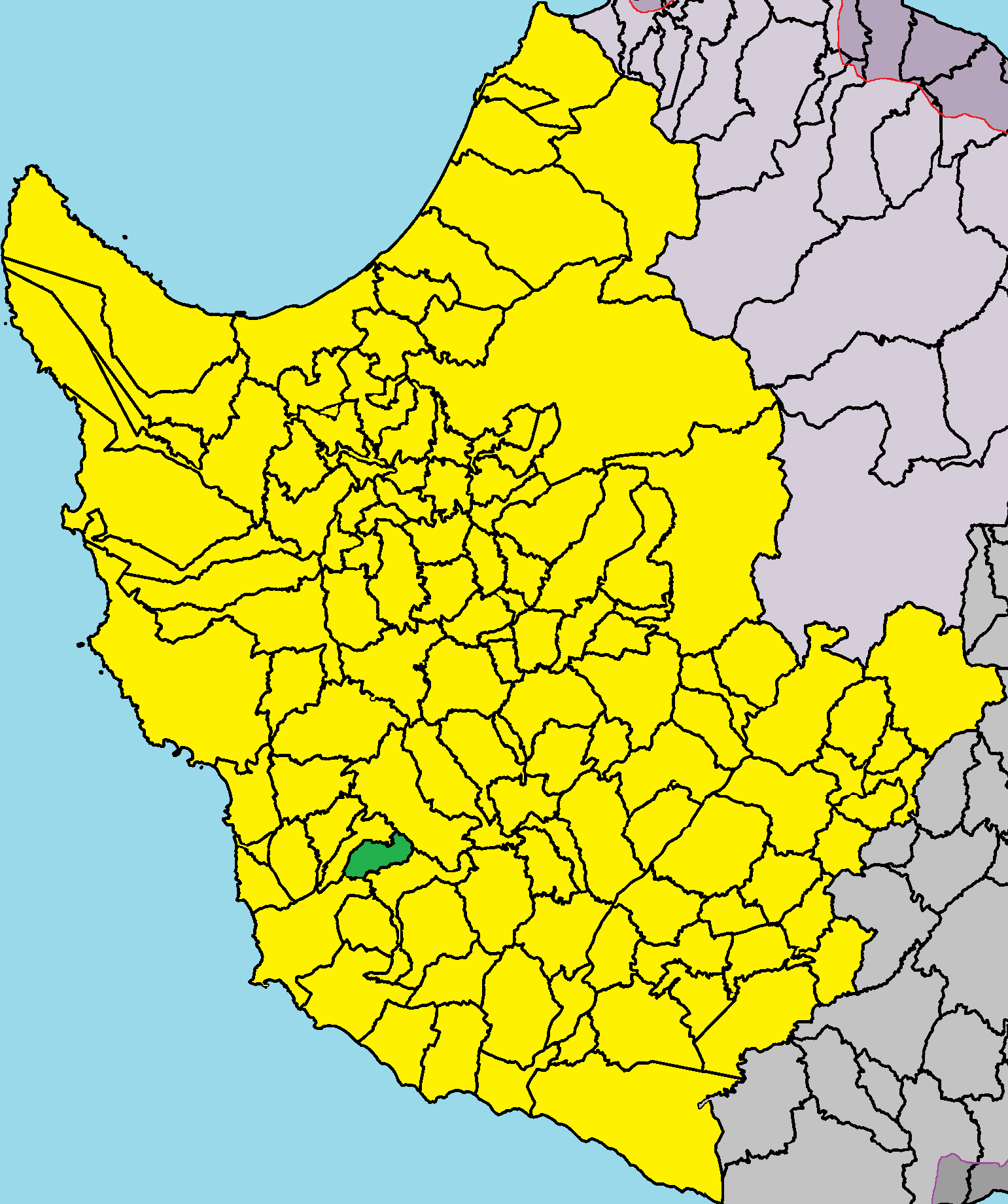
- Mesa Chorio

- Location in Cyprus
- Coordinates: 34°48′32″N 32°27′40″E
- Country: Cyprus
- District: Paphos District

Population (2001)
  - Total: 440
- Time zone: UTC+2 (EET)
  - Summer (DST): UTC+3 (EEST)
- Postal code: 8290

Mesa Chorio (Greek: Μέσα Χωριό) is a village in the Paphos District of Cyprus, located 1 km east of Mesogi.

== Topography ==
A small settlement standing at an elevation of 315 meters on the outskirts of the city, it offers views of the region and the beaches of the area. Mesa Chorio Paphou is near the urban centers’ infrastructure. There are accommodations and villas for rent, and modern buildings.

Mesa Chorio Paphou is bordered by Mesogi and Armou, and serves as a base for excursions to the surrounding area and the archaeological sites of Paphos.

== Elevation ==
Mesa Chorio has an elevation of 312 m.

== Nearby villages ==
Mesogi 1 km

Armou 3.8 km

Tsada 4.9 km
