= Lofou =

Lofou Λόφου
- Village
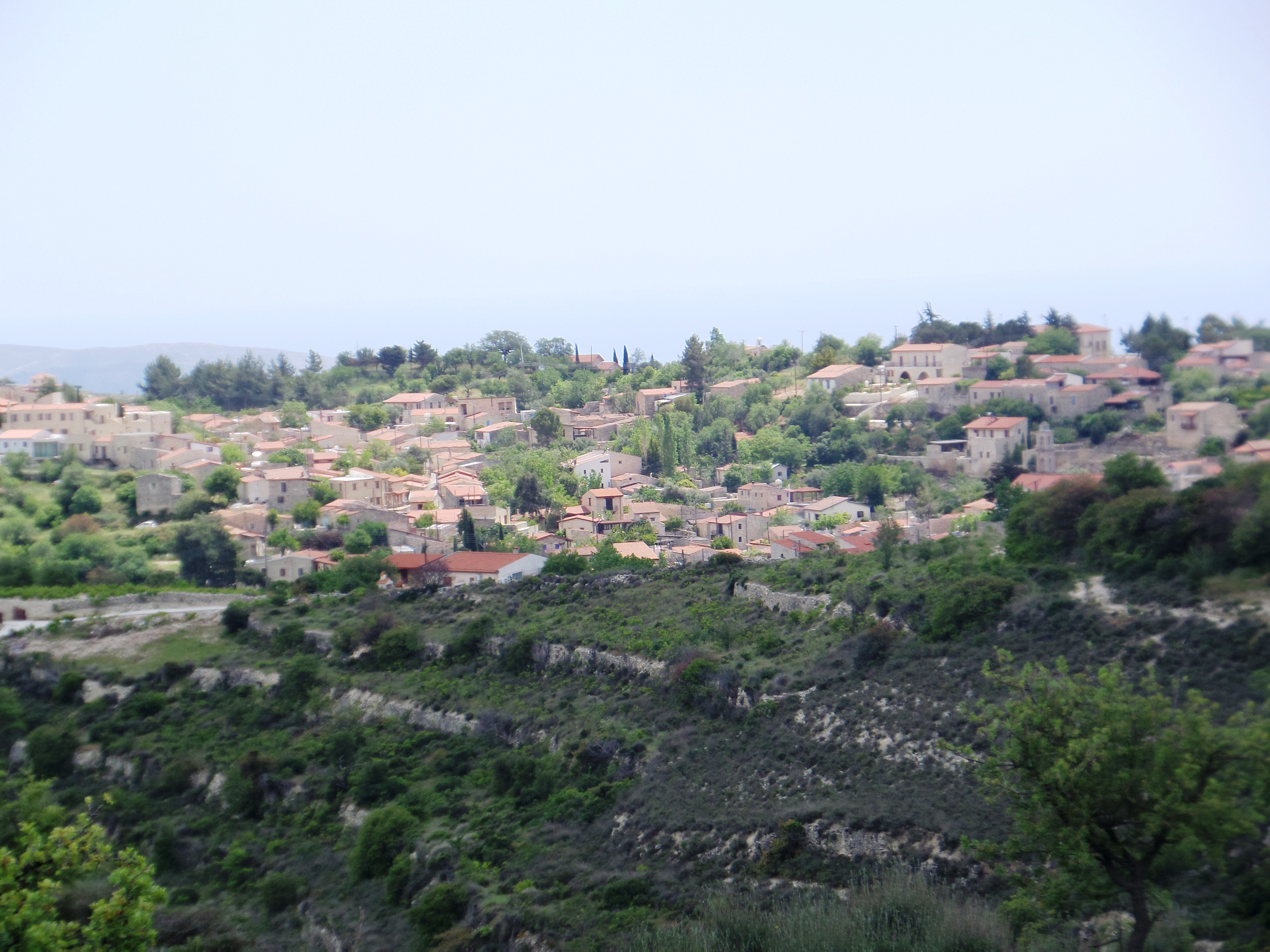
- Lofou village

- Location in Cyprus
- Coordinates: 34°48′57″N 32°52′31″E
- Country: Cyprus
- District: Limassol District

Population (2001)
  - Total: 10
- Time zone: UTC+2 (EET)
  - Summer (DST): UTC+3 (EEST)

Lofou (Greek: Λόφου) is a village in the Limassol District of Cyprus, located 5 km northeast of Agios Therapon. Archaeological evidence indicates the area around the village has been inhabited since at least the early to middle Bronze Age.
