= Palaichori =

Palaichori Παλαιχώρι
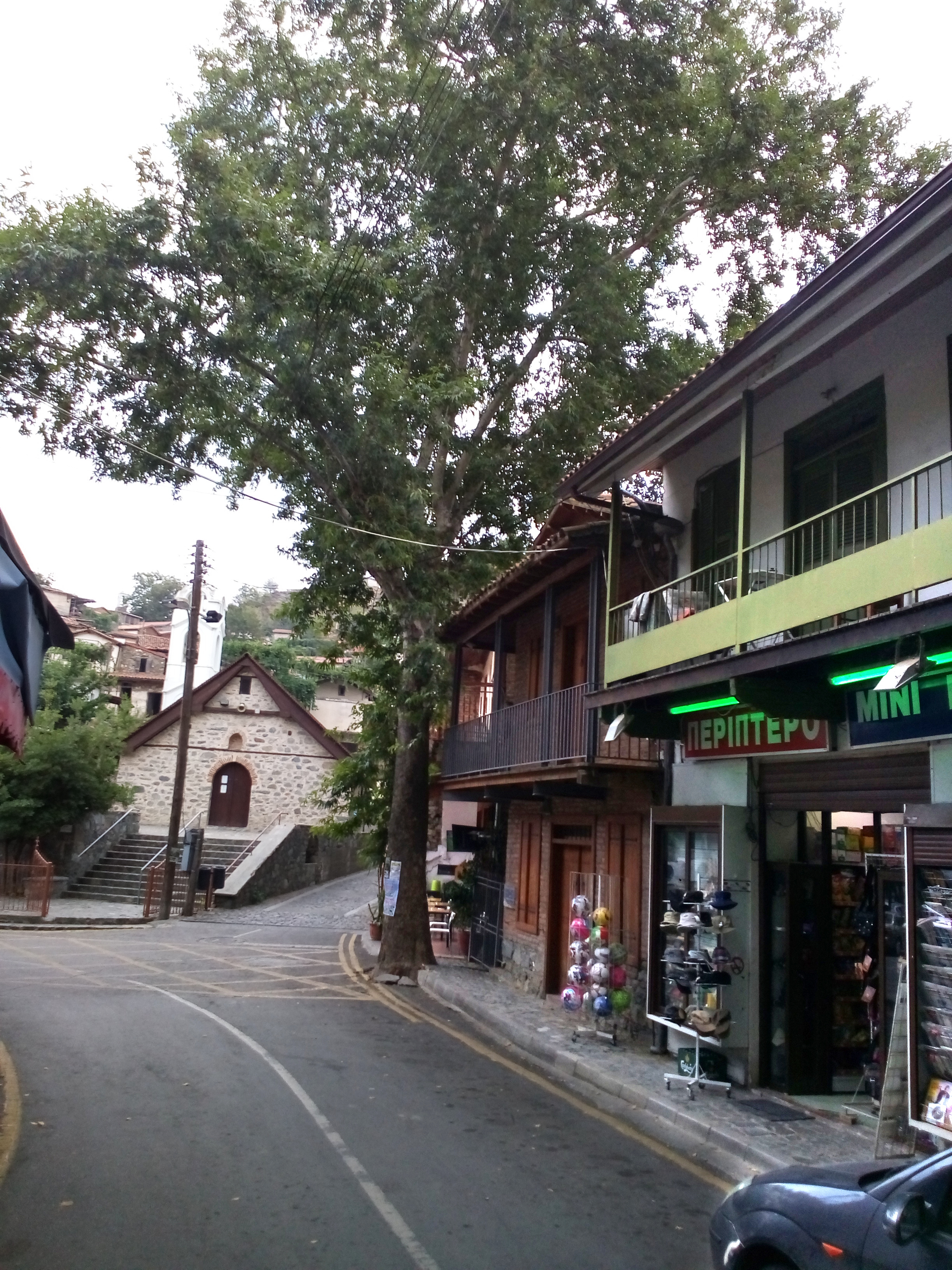

- Location in Cyprus
- Coordinates: 34°55′22″N 33°5′42″E
- Country: Cyprus
- District: Nicosia District
- Elevation: 3,050 ft (930 m)

Population (2001)
  - Total: 1,196
- Time zone: UTC+2 (EET)
  - Summer (DST): UTC+3 (EEST)
- Website: www.palaichori.org

Palaichori (Greek: Παλαιχώρι) is a settlement in the Nicosia District of Cyprus. It comprises two villages, Palaichori Oreinis and Palaichori Morphou, separated by the Serrache River. The villages stand at an altitude of 930 m.

== History, churches and monuments ==
Palaichori was first mentioned in 13th century documents. It is believed that Knights Templar got village from King of Cyprus Henry II of Jerusalem.

The church Panagia Chrysopantanassa is built in 16. century. Frescoes are influenced by both western and Byzantine styles. On the hill overlooking Palaichori there is Metamorfosis tou Sotiros (Greek: Μεταμορφώσης του Σωτήρος, The Church of the Transfiguration of the Saviour), church from 16. century, which is a UNESCO World Heritage Site along with nine other Painted Churches in the Troödos Region. Wall paintings in The Church of the Transfiguration of the Saviour are among the most complete of the Late Byzantine period in Cyprus. Paintings are influenced by art of Palaiologan period and some western art, but at same time keeping own style.

Church Agios Georgios is from about 16th -17th century. The Church of Saint Luke is built 1918. In village there is also Byzantine Heritage Museum with Byzantine arts and icons from churches of Palaichori and surrounding villages. Museum exhibits art from 12. to 17. century.

The statue of the Cypriot Mother overlooks village. Liberation Struggle Museum is opened in house which was hideout for EOKA liberation fighters. Businessman and politician Michael Zampelas (born 1942) was born in Palaichori. In Palaichori are also born:

- Michalis Karaolis
- Polycarpos Georgadjis
- Yiannakis Matsis
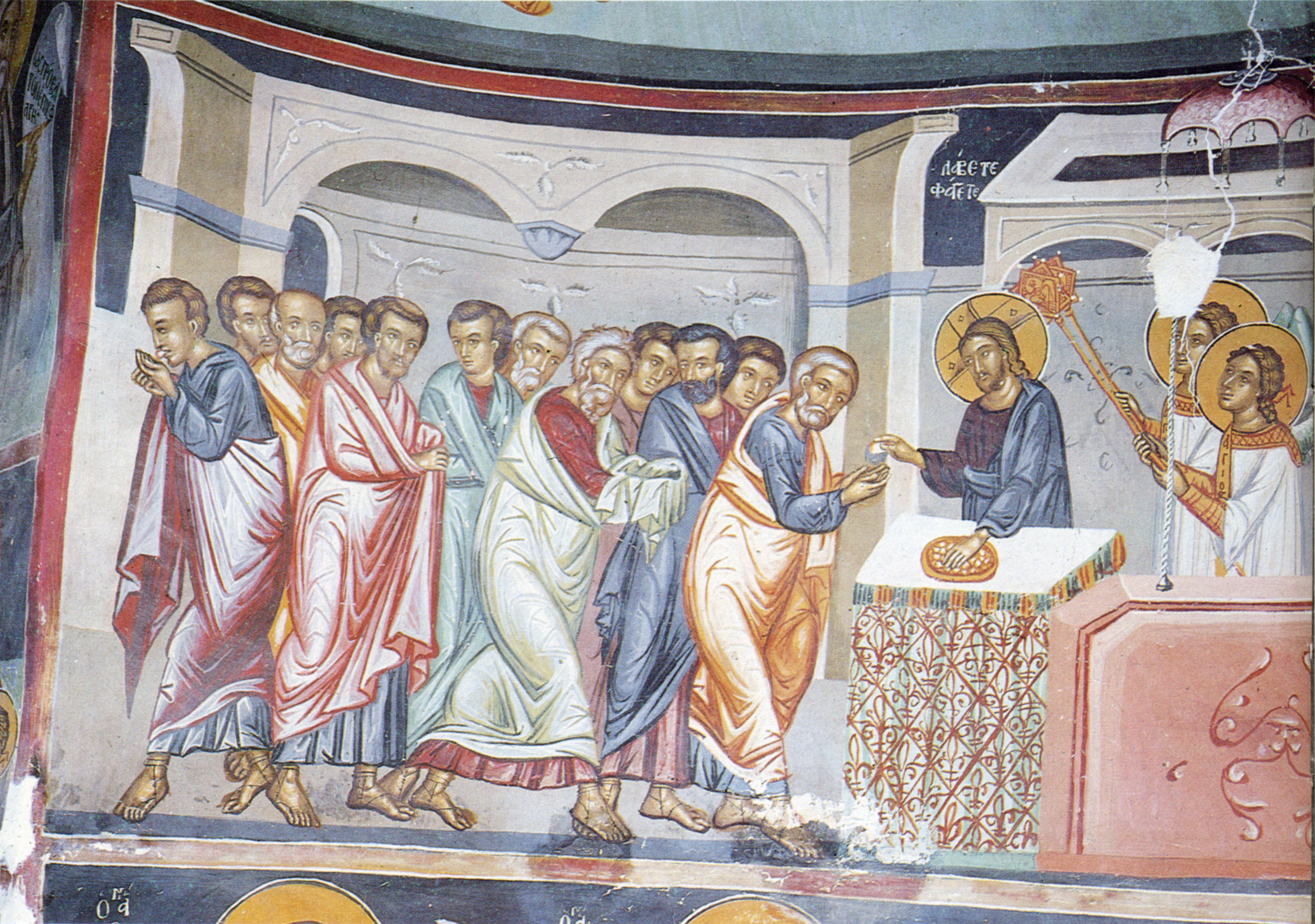

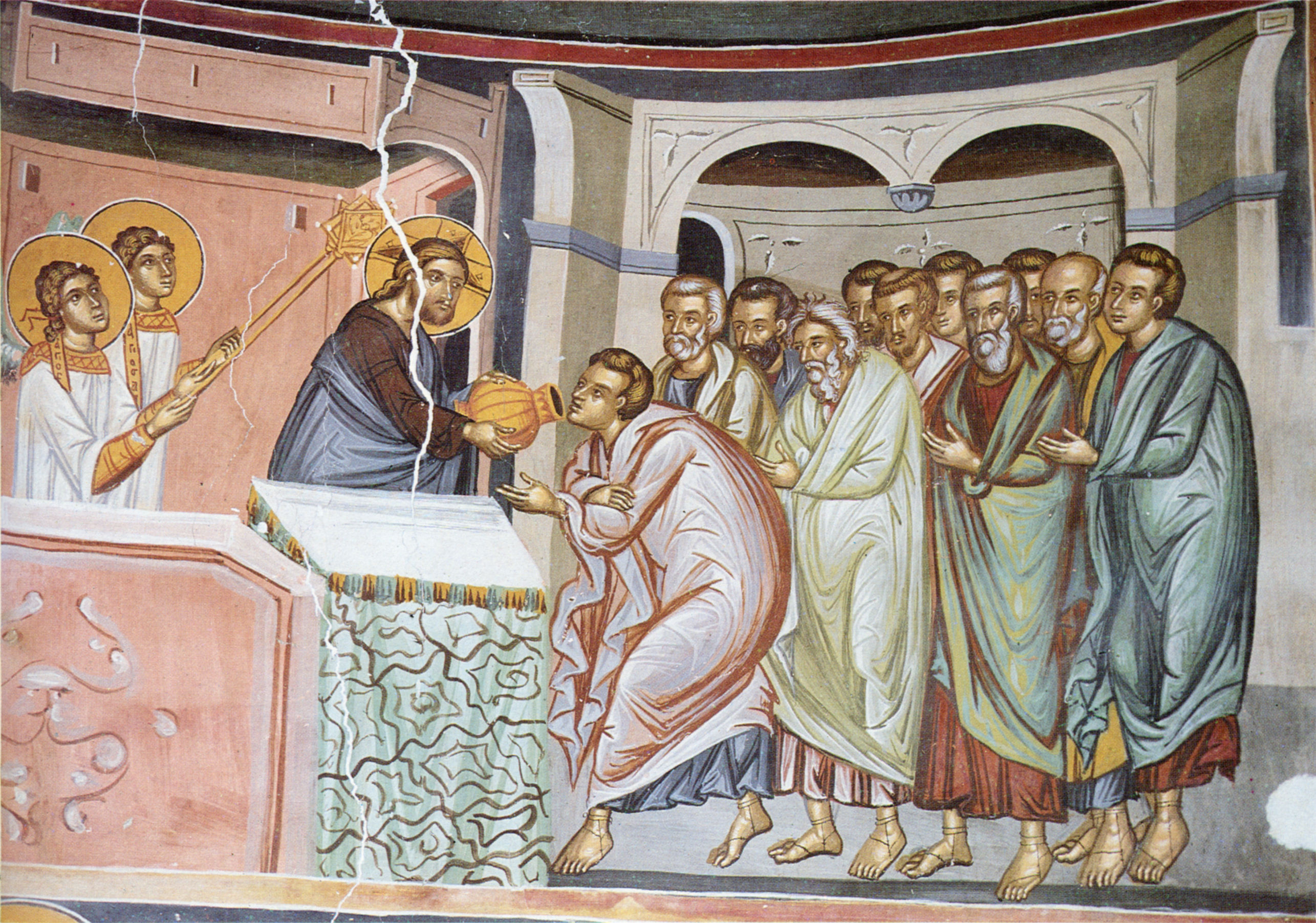

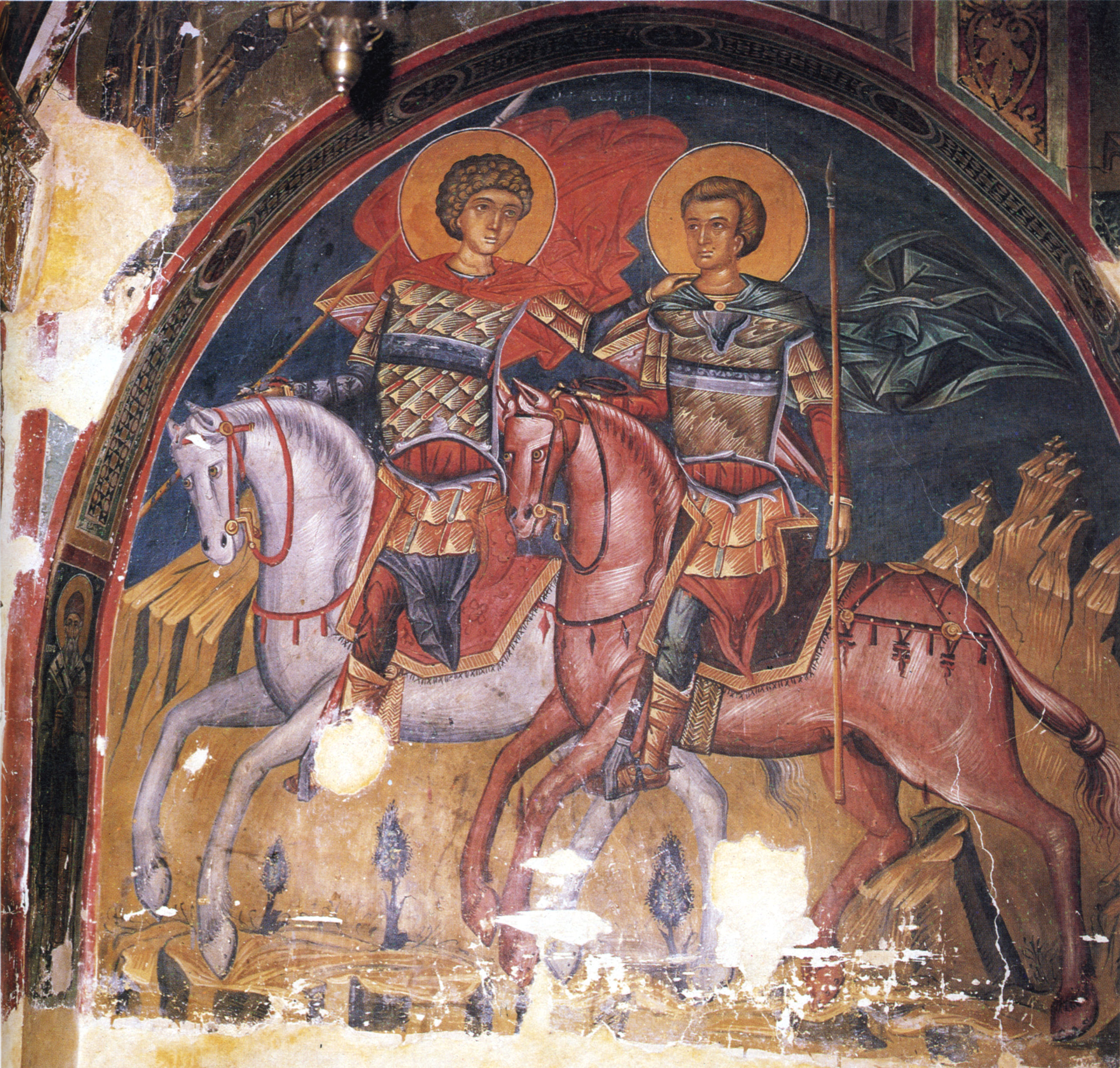

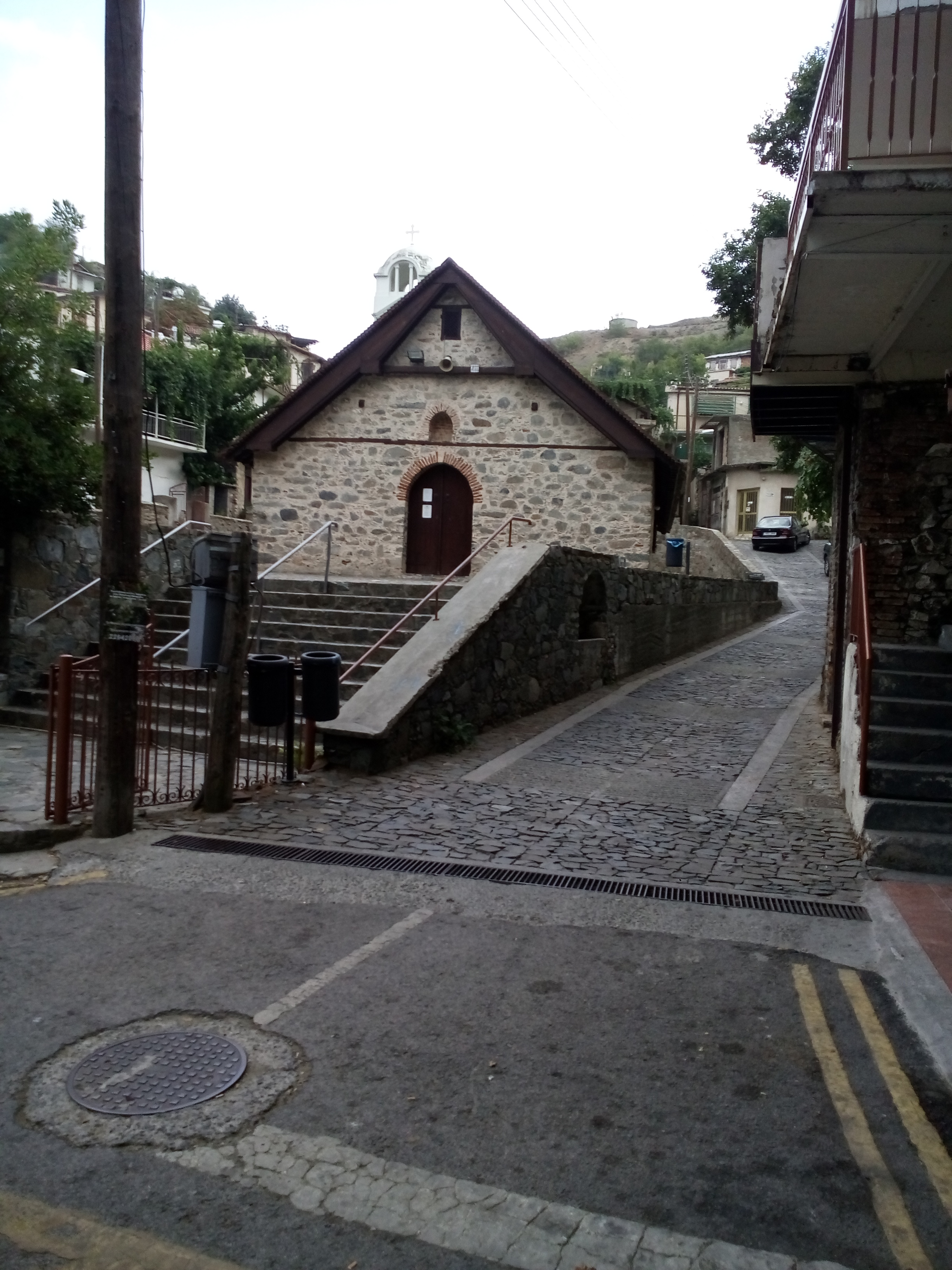
Church Panagia Chrysopantanassa
