= Ypsonas =

Municipality in the Limassol District of Cyprus

Ypsonas: Ύψωνας (Greek); İpsona (Turkish)
- Municipal district
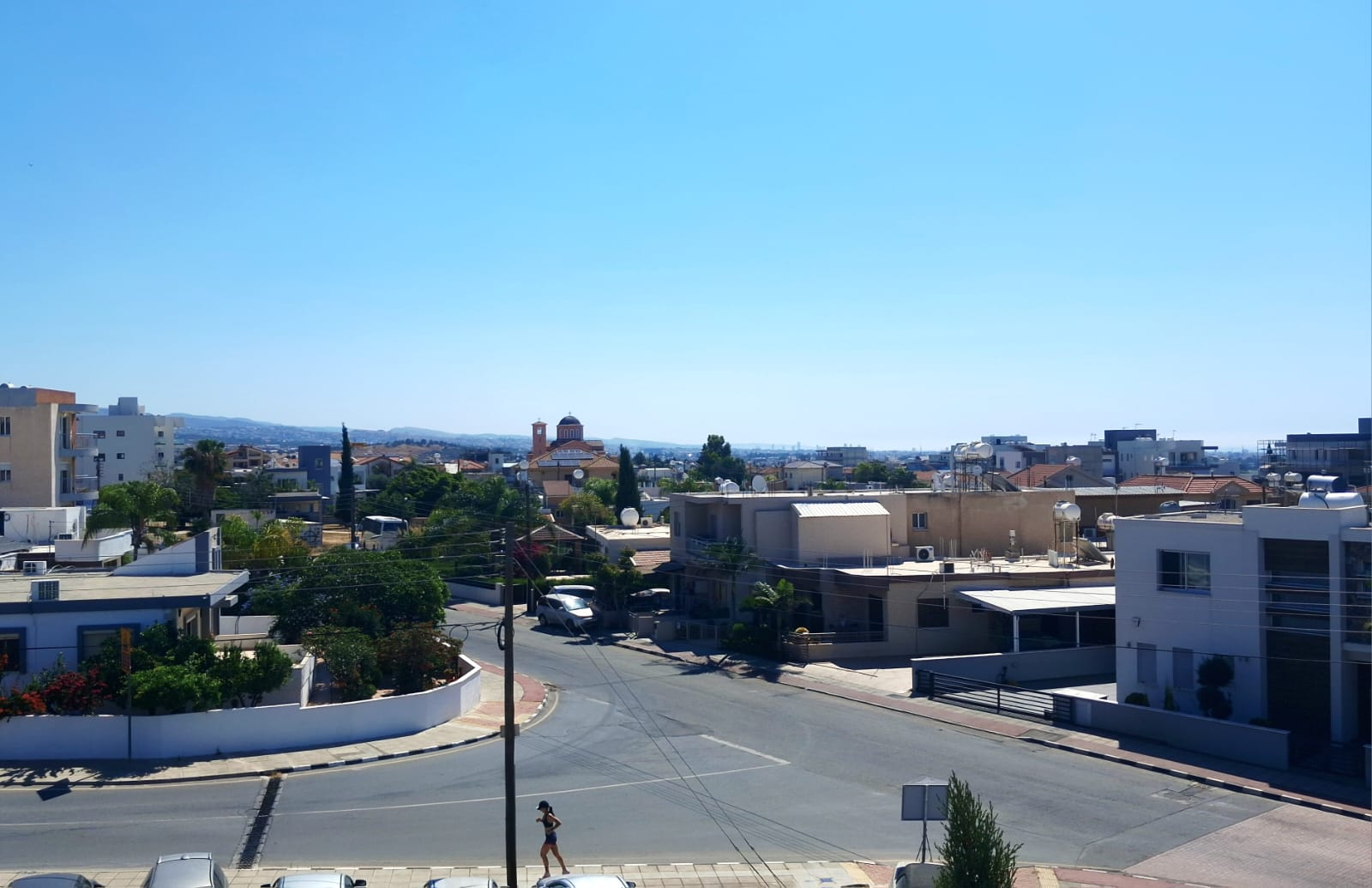
- View of Ypsonas municipal district at approximately 105 m elevation, looking towards Agios Savvas Church and Limassol City
- Interactive map of Ypsonas
- Location within Cyprus Location within the Eastern Mediterranean Location within the European Union Location within Asia
- Coordinates: 34°41′22″N 32°57′41″E
- Country: Cyprus
- District: Limassol District
- Urban area: Limassol
- Municipality: Kourion Municipality
- Incorporated into Kourion Municipality: 1 July 2024

Government
  - Body: Municipal Council of Kourion
  - Deputy mayor: Aleka Stylianou

Area
  - Municipal district: 32.38 km^{2} (12.50 sq mi)

Population (2021)
  - Municipal district: 13,966
  - Density: 431.3/km^{2} (1,117/sq mi)
- Time zone: UTC+2 (EET)
  - Summer (DST): UTC+3 (EEST)
- Website: kourion.org

Ypsonas or Ipsonas (Greek: Ύψωνας, romanized: Ypsōnas, Turkish: İpsona), is a municipal district of the Kourion Municipality in the Limassol District of Cyprus. Until the 2024 local government reform, it was a municipality in its own right. It is one of the largest settlements in western Limassol District and is located about 7 kilometres (4.3 mi) west of Limassol. The southern part of the municipal district lies within the Sovereign Base Area of Akrotiri, part of the Sovereign Base Areas of Akrotiri and Dhekelia. According to the 2021 census, Ypsonas had a population of 13,966.

== History and archaeology ==
Ypsonas has existed since the Middle Ages. Farmers from Lofou used to migrate seasonally to Ypsonas. Permanent settlement began during the British rule. Today, traces of churches built in medieval times are to be seen related to St. Agios Sylas.

Before the 2024 local government reform, Ypsonas was one of the larger municipalities in Limassol District. Following the reform, it became the municipal seat of Kourion Municipality.

In recent decades, Ypsonas has developed a variety of agricultural cultivations, including wine grapes, oranges, carobs and other fruit crops. Industrial activity in the area includes processed meat production, cheese production, cement-related industries, wooden furniture manufacturing and the packaging of agricultural products. The area has the fourth-largest industrial workforce in the wider Limassol area.

Many of its permanent residents work for tourism, trade, transport and services and many non-Cypriot labourers are seasonal workers in the agricultural part of Ypsonas.

The number of permanent residents grew significantly from just 3 in 1881 to 10,950 by the 2011 census. Initially, there were only 3 residents in 1881, increasing to 4 in 1892. By 1901, the population had risen to 21. In 1921, it reached 167, and by 1931, there were 256 residents. The population continued to grow, with 492 residents recorded in 1946. By 1960, the number had increased to 1,496, and in 1973, it was 2,043. The count reached 3,061 in 1982, and by 2011, there were 10,950 residents.

Although legend has it that Ypsonas was established by immigrants from another municipality in Cyprus, starting with the first individual who moved from Lofou to Ypsonas (Giorkatzis Chatzistyllis, born in 1887 in Lofou), who initially tended his lands in Ypsonas by traveling there on a donkey from Lofou seasonally, and later decided to settle permanently in the area, the history is not so straightforward. The location has existed since the medieval era, as evidenced by its name ‘Ipsonas’ on medieval maps. In 1426, the Mamluks of Egypt invaded Cyprus and seized Limassol, beginning their invasion from Episkopi. This leads to the theory that Ypsonas was destroyed during the Mamluk invasion and later again during the 1570 invasion of Cyprus by Turkish ships, which attacked Limassol and reached the Polemidia area near Ypsonas.

Today, Ypsonas has an economic growth due to industrial activity, the expansion of the municipality and enhancements in infrastructure. It had become from a tiny village into a large municipality with more than 10,000 residents, and a broad range of amenities.

The municipality has decided to maintain the traditional architecture of old houses within the old city and does not allow the introduction of architectural elements that do not coincide with said style in the proximity of St. George's Church.

Archaeology for this area is found mainly in its medieval heritage, either the very old homes in the old part of the municipality where they retain even through renovations their original character. The medieval site of Agios Sylas is known as the main archaeological attraction of the municipality.

Part of the Ypsonas municipal district belongs to the United Kingdom Sovereign Base Areas. This area has its own separate police (the British Forces in Cyprus Police) but the number used to call them is 112, the same as in the Republic of Cyprus and all countries in the European Union. The SBA of Akrotiri that expands to parts of Ypsonas is open to access to vehicles and humans without border control and it incorporates the villages: Ypsonas, Erimi, Akrotiri, Asomatos, Avdimou, Trachoni, Fasouri, Sotira, Tserkezoi, Pisouri, Kolosi, Episkopi and Paramali.

== Demographics ==
The population of Ypsonas has increased steadily since the late 19th century.

=== Religion ===
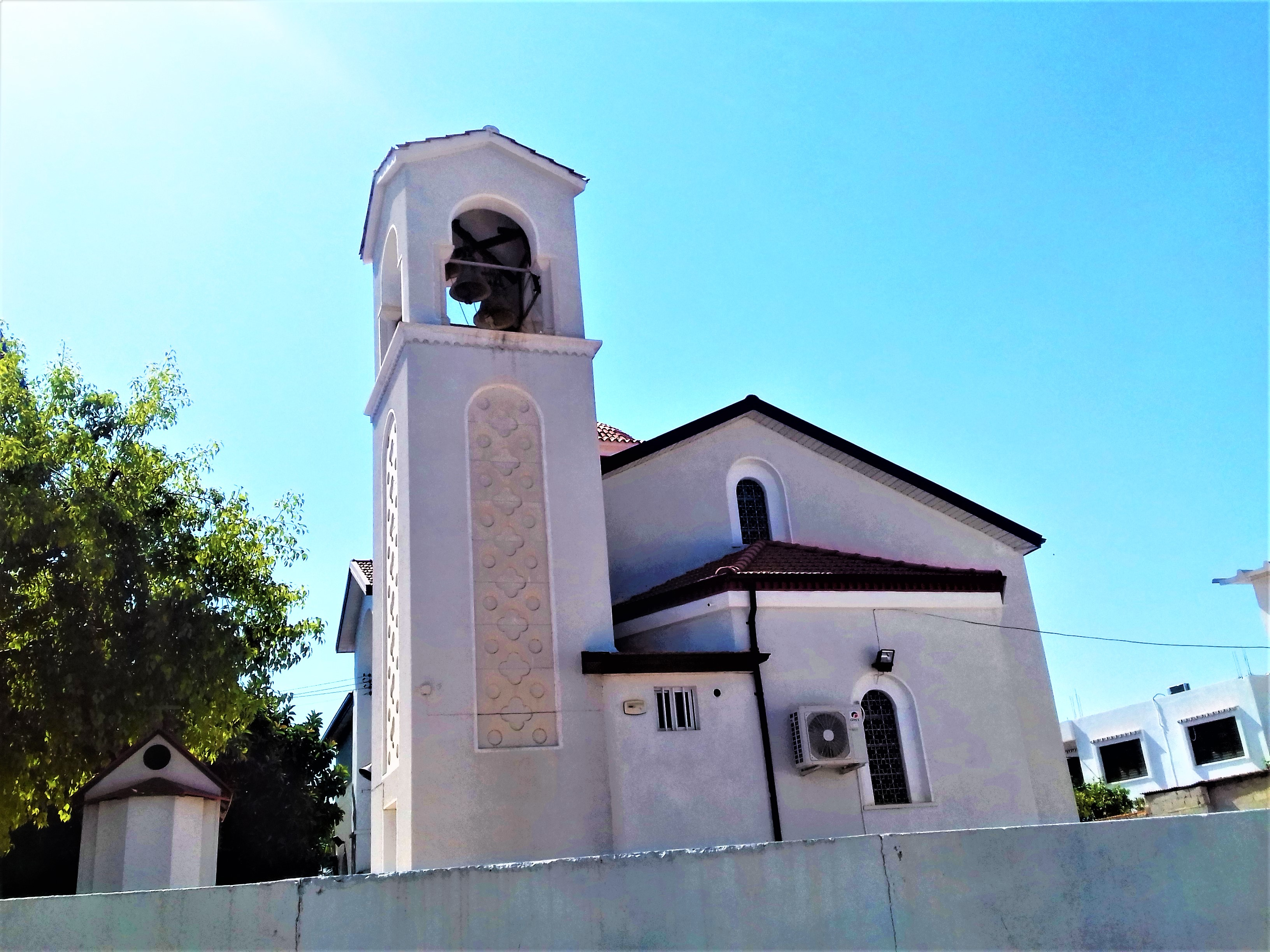
Saint George The Poor of Ypsonas Village

Ypsonas has three churches and three smaller chapels, for its predominantly Greek Orthodox community.

- Holy Church of Agios Savvas (Ιερὸς Ναὸς Άγιου Σάββα), built in 2007
- Holy Church of Saint Mary Chryssopolitissa (Ιερὸς Ναὸς Παναγίας Χρυσοπολιτίσσης), built around 1839
- Holy Church of Saint George The Poor (Ιερὸς Ναὸς Ἁγίου Γεωργίου του Φτωχού), built in the 1950s
- Chapel of Saint George Vikliou (Άγιο Γεώργιο του Βικλιού), a modern tiny chapel built by religious residents near the Agios Sylas area
- Chapel of Saint Vichianos (Ξωκλήσι του Αγίου Βηχιανού), built in 1969 based on legends of an older church with the same name
- Chapel of Saint Raphael (Ξωκλησι του Αγίου Ραφαήλ), built in 1995 in old Byzantine-style stavroides me troulo

== Politics and government ==
Since the erection of the Ypsonas Municipality in 2012, there have been 2 Mayors.

Mayors of Ypsonas Municipality
Year(s) served	Name of Mayor	Ref.
2012-2016	Aristos Palouzas	
2017-2024	Pantelis Eftichiou Georgiou	

Deputy Mayors of Ypsonas Municipal District
Term	Name of Deputy Mayor	Ref.
2024-current	Aleka Stylianou	

== Education ==
Ypsonas has many elementary schools and 1 Gymnasium plus 1 continuing education school for adults plus a continuating education school for adults according to the EU mandate for life-long learning

== Transport ==
Ypsonas is served by the Limassol public bus network. Routes 23 and 23A serve Ypsonas Centre, with route 23 operating as a Ypsonas Centre circle line. Other nearby routes connect the wider western Limassol area with destinations including Kolossi, Episkopi, Akrotiri and central Limassol.

Road access is provided through local avenues including Ilias Kannaourou Avenue and through connections to the wider Limassol road network and the main Limassol highway.

== Geography ==
=== Topography ===
Ypsonas is built at an altitude of 90 meters. The village area has an inclination from north to south. The altitude decreases from 479 in north to 90 in the village level and to 20 towards southern parts.

=== Climate ===
Ypsonas has an annual rainfall of 440 cm. The open cultivated fields of Ypsonas Industrial area do not have any tall buildings and thus the temperature in summer can be higher than within the shaded (due to buildings) city of Limassol. Ypsonas also may have more wind than Limassol city for the same reason.

== Economy ==
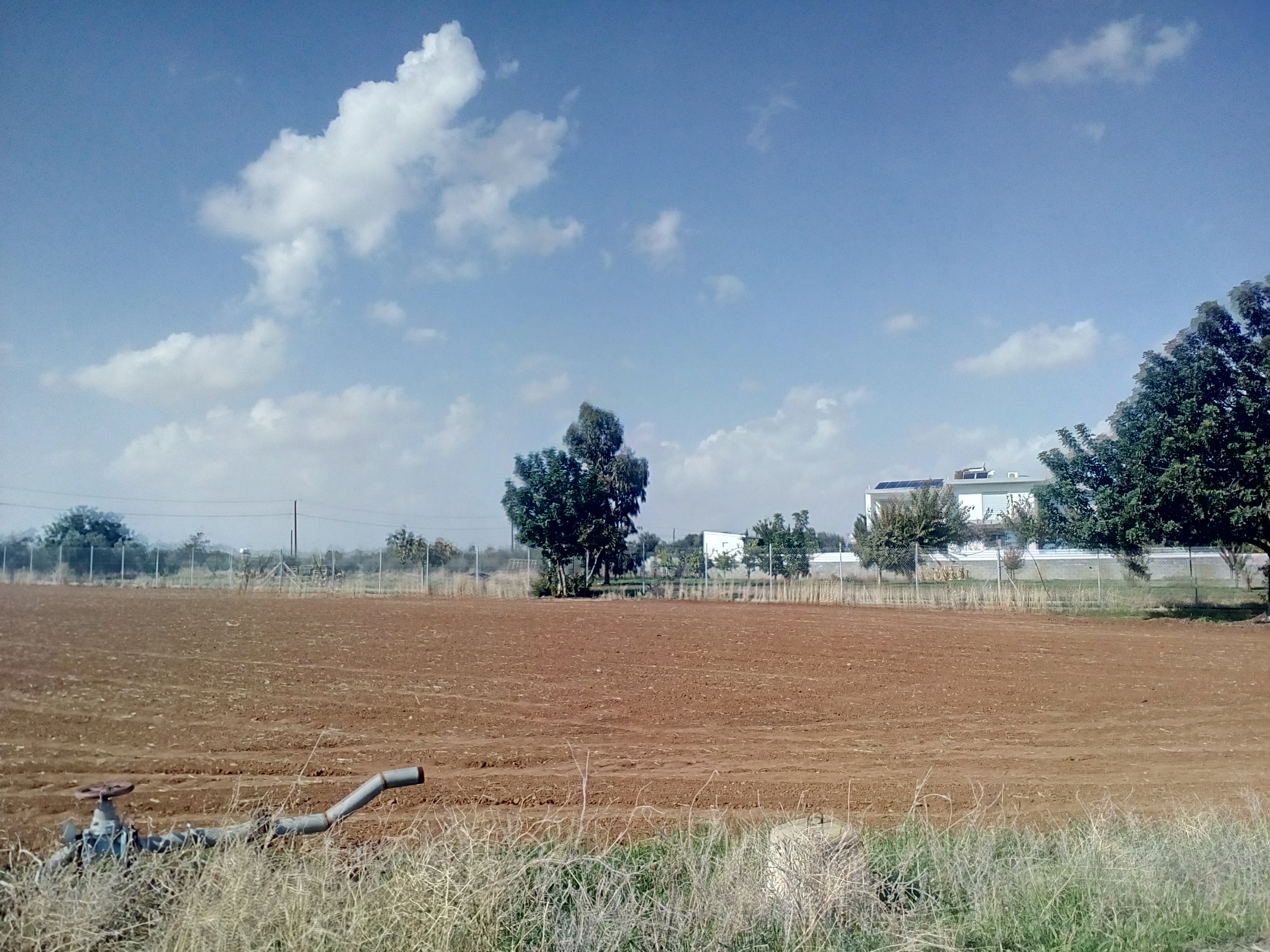
Cultivated agricultural field in Ypsonas Industrial Area, Limassol

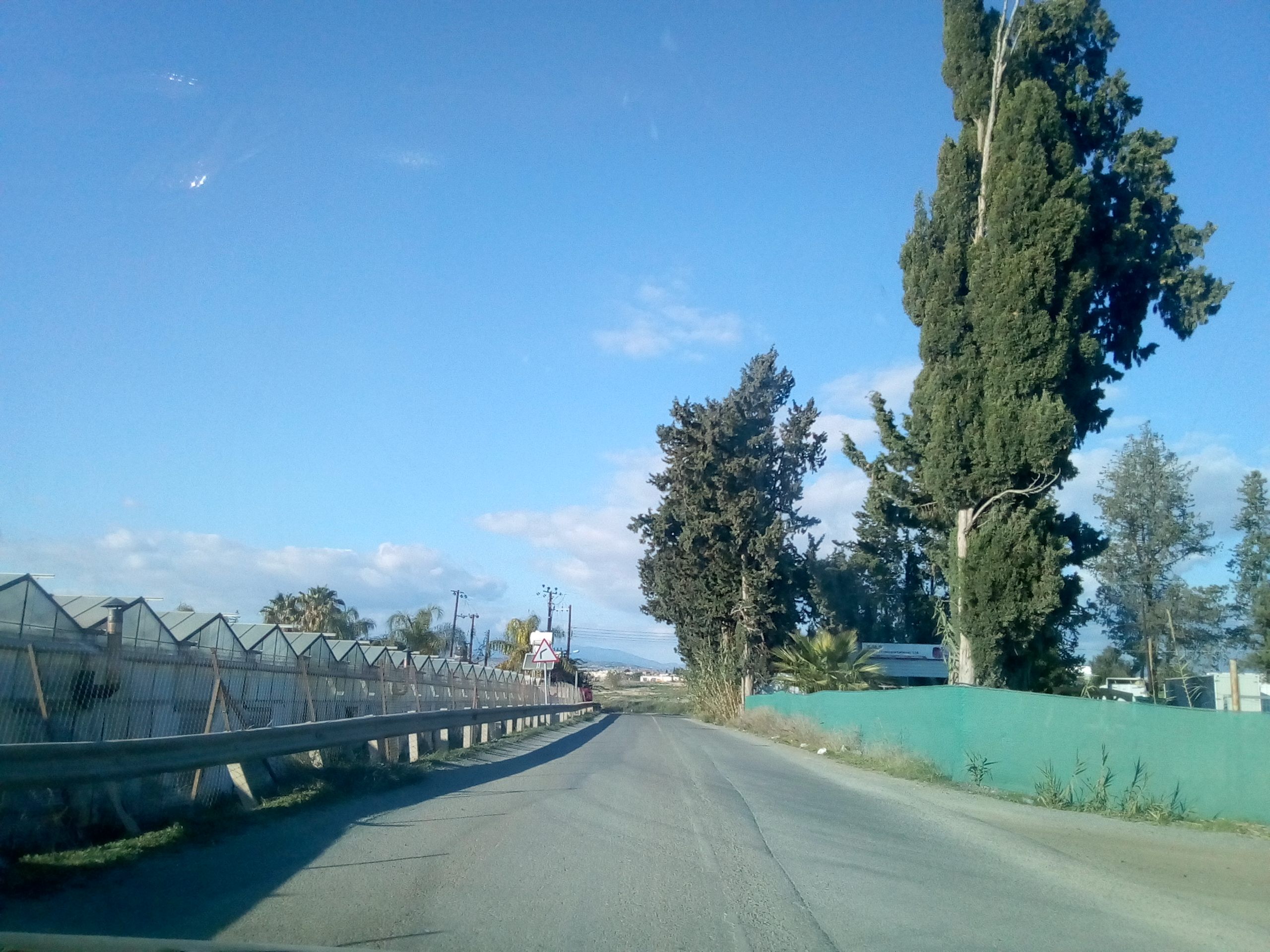
Cultivation houses in Ypsonas Industrial Area

The Industrial Area of Ypsonas has many cultivated fields which produce ready-made grass, vines, citrus fruits, almonds, olives, carobs, and milk from goat herds.

Cement Plant in Ypsonas, Limassol Industrial Area

In the same area, large cement factories operate, as well as much used car-parts processing.

Ypsonas has a blooming industry development. The number of people that work in industries in this area are the fourth-largest in Limassol. The main industrial factories are charcuteries, cheese and cured meat factories, saw factories, boat manufacturing factories, and wooden furniture factories as well as product and packing of fruit and vegetable products. There are since 2000s more restaurants of internationally known fast foods chains and more and supermarkets.

== Sports ==
Ypsonas has gyms, soccer stadiums and teams including Digenis FC, tennis academy Ioannides and Krasava ENY Ypsonas FC.
