= Kotsiatis =

Kotsiatis: Κοτσιάτης (Greek); Koççat (Turkish)
- Location in Cyprus
- Coordinates: 35°0′45″N 33°20′59″E
- Country: Cyprus
- District: Nicosia District

Government
  - Type: Community council

Population (2011)
  - Total: 160
- Time zone: UTC+2 (EET)
  - Summer (DST): UTC+3 (EEST)

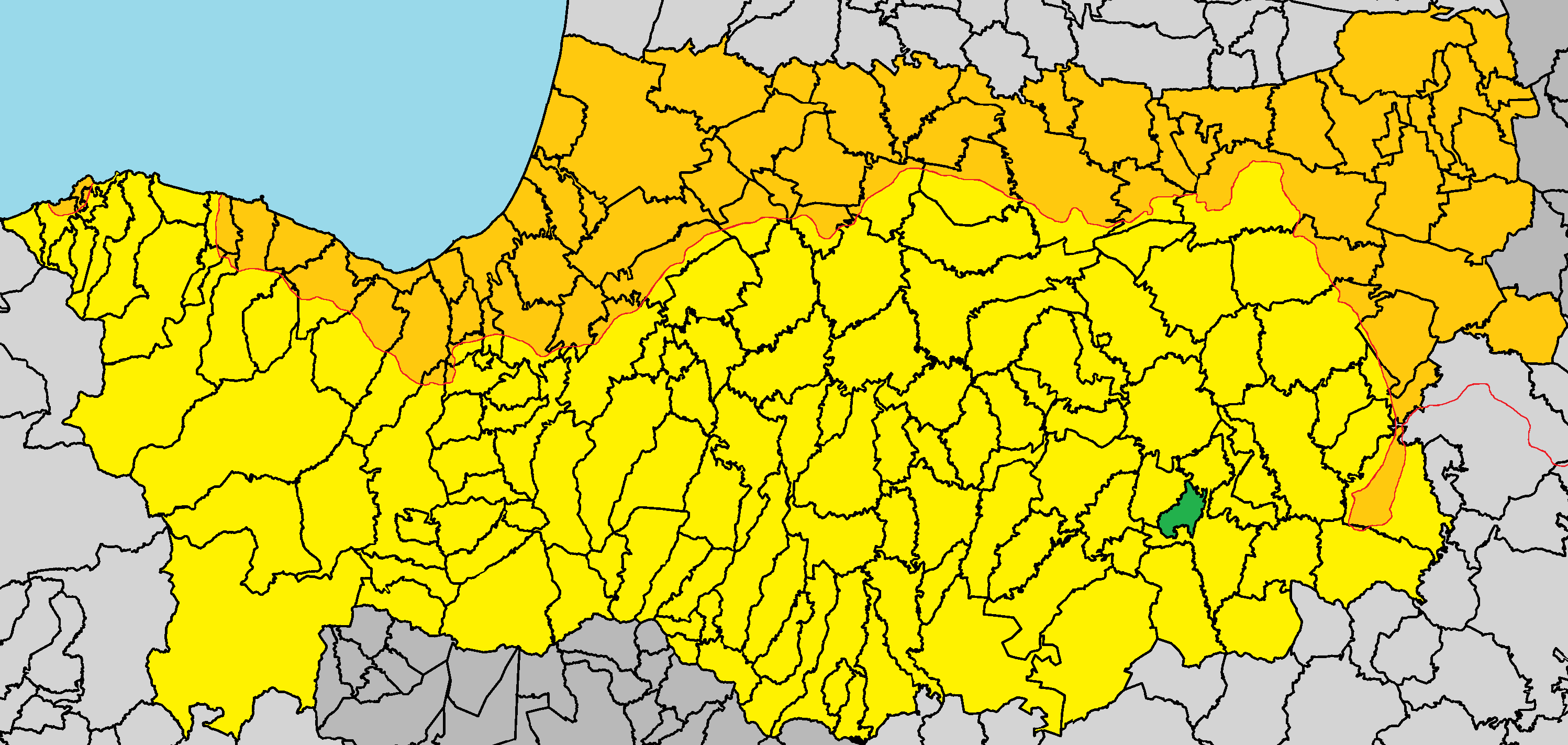
Map of Kotsiatis in the Nicosia District

Kotsiatis (Greek: Κοτσιάτης [locally [koˈt͡ʃʰatis]]; Turkish: Koççat) is a village located in the Nicosia District of Cyprus.

The village was originally inhabited by Turkish Cypriots, but today the majority of Kotsiatis's population consists of Maronites, who were displaced from Agia Marina in 1976.
