= Agia Marina (Skylloura) =

Agia Marina: Αγία Μαρίνα (Greek); Gürpınar (Turkish)
- Location within Cyprus
- Coordinates: 35°13′N 33°08′E
- Country (de jure): Cyprus
  - District: Nicosia District
- Country (de facto): Northern Cyprus
  - District: Lefkoşa District
- Time zone: UTC+2 (EET)
  - Summer (DST): UTC+3 (EEST)

Agia Marina (Greek: Αγία Μαρίνα (Σκυλλούρας); Turkish: Gürpınar) is a village in Cyprus, situated 24 km west of Nicosia. It takes its name from Marina the Monk, the Christian saint of Byzantine Syria. De facto, Agia Marina is under the control of Northern Cyprus.

== History ==
By 1963, Agia Marina had a mixed population that reportedly comprised 400 Maronites and 65 Turkish Cypriots. In January 1964, during the Cyprus crisis of 1963–64, the Turkish Cypriots of Agia Marina fled to the Turkish enclave of Nicosia. During the Turkish invasion of Cyprus, all Maronites moved to the south of the island, mainly to Kotsiatis, and the name of the village was changed to Gürpınar, meaning “strong, powerful spring” in Turkish. From 1974 onwards, Agia Marina has been used as a Turkish military camp, while its original inhabitants were not allowed to enter the village, despite the 2003 relaxations on inter-communal movement.

On a nearby hill, a statue of Kemal Atatürk, the founder of modern Turkey, has been erected. In 2016, the re-construction of the Gürpınar mosque, damaged in the 1953 earthquake, began.

By March 2017, as the Turkish Cypriot Yeniduzen newspaper reported, the Turkish Army began moving out of the village, ostensibly with the purpose of allowing former residents to move in, though no specific timetable for resettlement was given. The chairman of the "Gurpinar (Ayia Marina) solidarity society" Mehmet Hoca stated that "the decision was taken three and a half years ago by the Turkish Cypriot authorities" in order to enable the villagers to "live together."

== Festivities ==
A Mushroom Fest is organised regularly in the village.
