= Palaichori Morphou =

Palaichori Morphou: Παλαιχώρι Μόρφου (Greek); Balahor (Turkish)
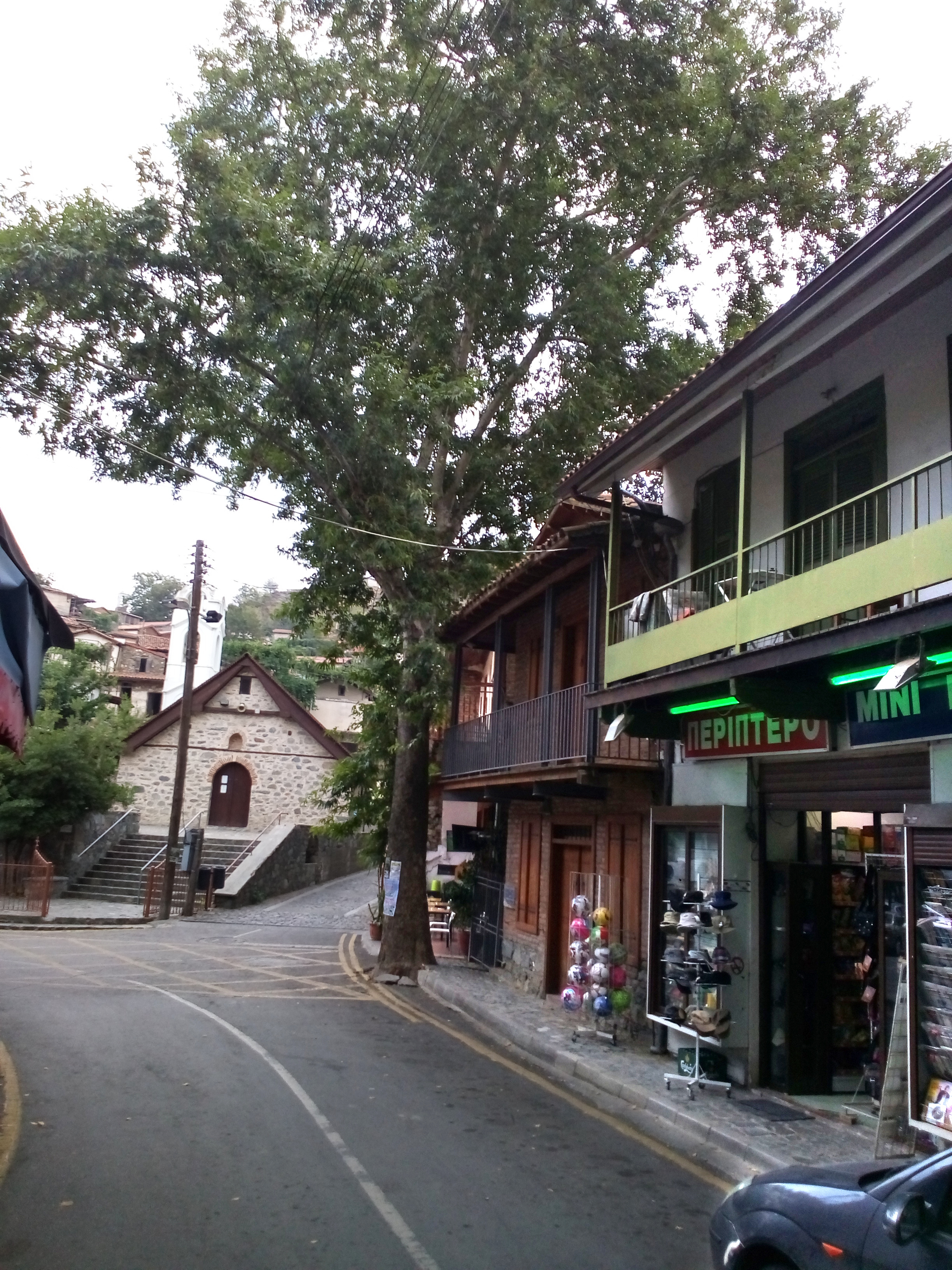

- Location in Cyprus
- Coordinates: 34°55′25″N 33°05′28″E
- Country: Cyprus
- District: Nicosia District
- Elevation: 2,251 ft (686 m)

Population (2001)
  - Total: 1,196
- Time zone: UTC+2 (EET)
  - Summer (DST): UTC+3 (EEST)
- Website: www.palaichori.org

Palaichori Morphou (Greek: Παλαιχώρι Μόρφου; Turkish: Balahor) is a village located in the Nicosia District of Cyprus on the E 903 road. The village stands at an altitude of 930 m. Palaichori Morphou is separated from Palaichori Oreinis by the Serrache River.
