= Katokopia Stadium =

Sports venue in Cyprus

Coordinates: 35°7′45″N 33°5′2″E

- Interactive map of Katokopia Stadium
- Location: Peristerona, Cyprus
- Capacity: 3,500
- Surface: Grass

Construction
- Built: 1978
- Opened: 1978
- Renovated: 2022

Tenants
- Doxa Katokopias F.C. PAC Omonia 29M (2024-present)

Katokopia Stadium is a multi-use stadium in Peristerona, Cyprus. It is currently used mostly for football matches and is the home ground of Doxa Katokopia of the Cypriot Second Division. The stadium was renovated in 2022 and holds 3,500 people.
