= Ayia Marina Chrysochous =

Ayia Marina Άγια Μαρίνα
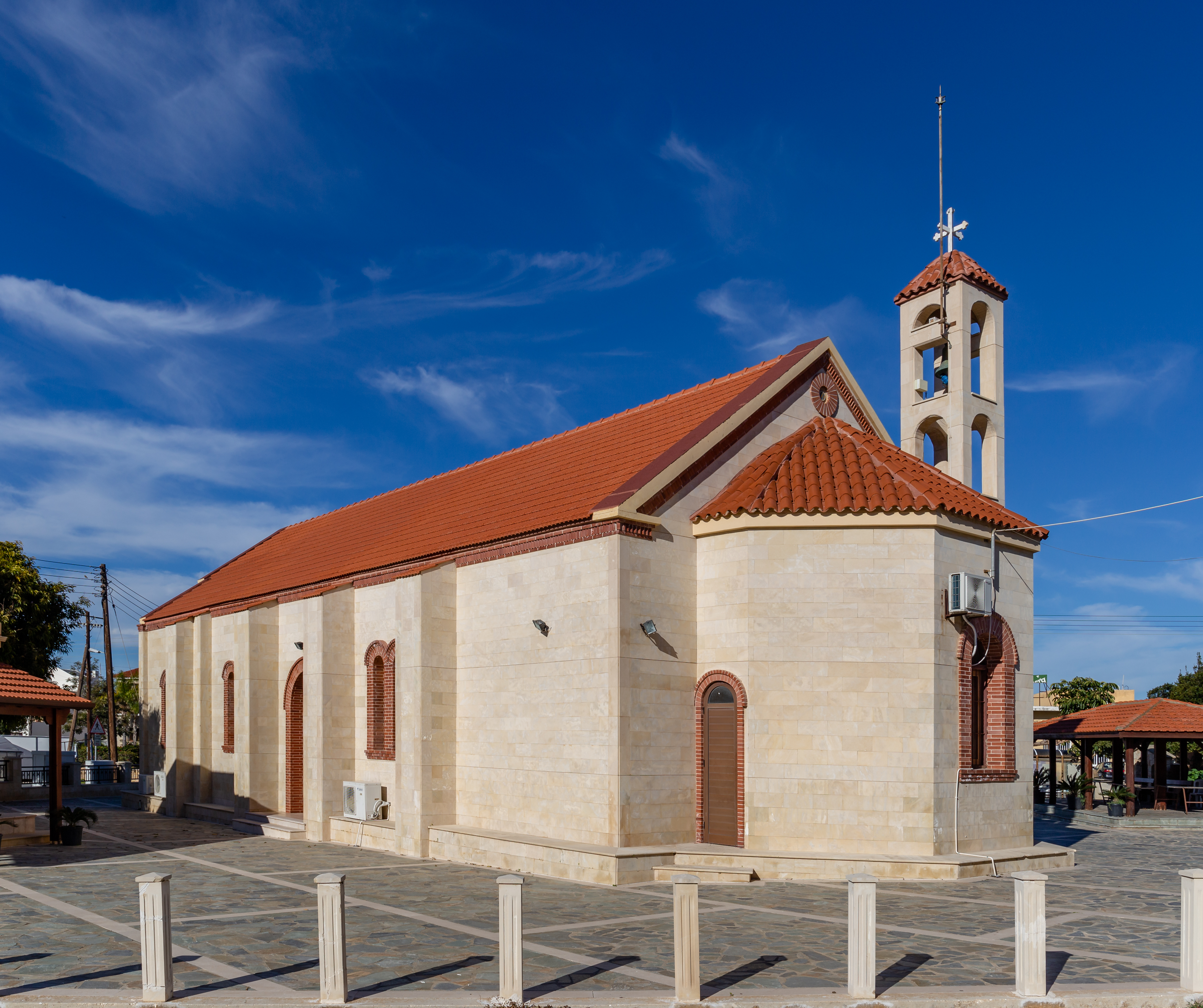
- A church dedicated to Ayia Marina in Ayia Marina Chrysochous, Cyprus

- Location in Cyprus
- Coordinates: 35°06′00″N 32°32′0″E
- Country: Cyprus
- District: Paphos District
- Time zone: UTC+2 (EET)
  - Summer (DST): UTC+3 (EEST)

Ayia Marina (Greek: Άγια Μαρίνα) is a village located in the Paphos District of Cyprus, in the Tylliria region.
