= Palaichori Oreinis =

Palaichori Oreinis: Παλαιχώρι Ορεινής (Greek); Balahor (Turkish)
- Village
- Location in Cyprus
- Coordinates: 34°55′19″N 33°05′38″E
- Country: Cyprus
- District: Nicosia District
- Elevation: 2,251 ft (686 m)

Population (2001)
  - Total: 333
- Time zone: UTC+2 (EET)
  - Summer (DST): UTC+3 (EEST)
- Website: www.palaichori.org

Palaichori Oreinis (Greek: Παλαιχώρι Ορεινής; Turkish: Balahor) is a village located in the Nicosia District of Cyprus on the E 903 road. The village stands at an altitude of 930 m. Palaichori Oreinis is separated by Palaichori Morphou by the Serrache River. The two villages are known collectively as Palaichori.

The village contains a 16th-century church, Metamorfosis tou Sotiros (Greek: Μεταμορφώσης του Σωτήρος). The church is one of the ten Painted Churches in the Troödos Region, which were inscribed as a UNESCO World Heritage Site in 1985 because of their outstanding frescoes and testimony to the history of Byzantine rule in Cyprus.
