= Armou =

- Location within Cyprus
- Coordinates: 34°47′58″N 32°28′43″E
- Country: Cyprus
- District: Paphos District
- Elevation: 363 m (1,191 ft)

Population (2011)
  - Total: 600

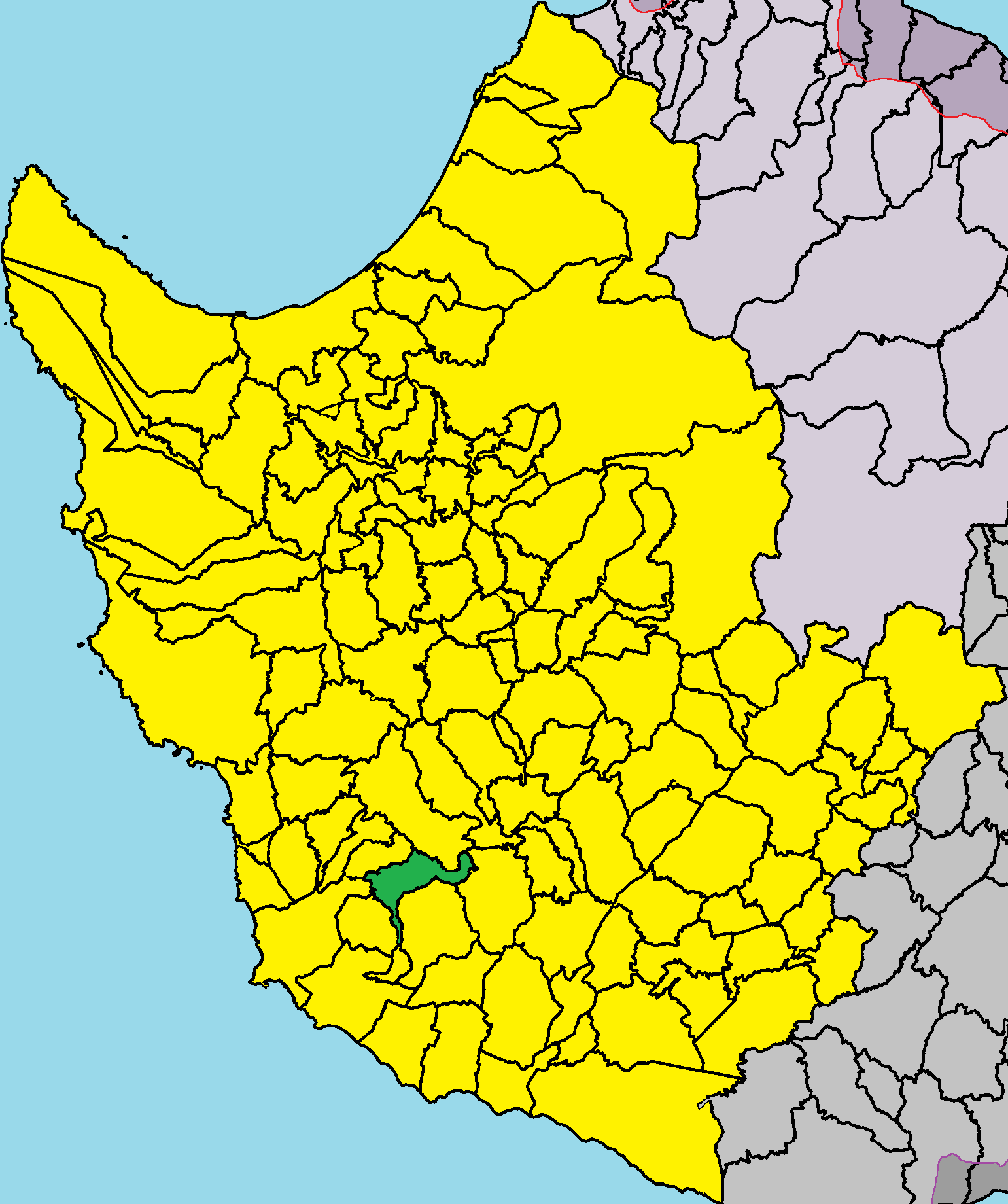
Armou in Paphos District.

Armou (Greek: (η) Άρμου) is a village in the Paphos District of Cyprus, located 4 kilometres (2.5 mi) south-east of Mesogi. It has a panoramic view of Paphos. Armou is located 363m above sea level. The area has been inhabited since pre-Christian times, according to the findings now exhibited at the Archaeological Museum of Paphos. The name of the community emerged from its first settler called Armos, while another version speaks of the “armos (joint in Greek)“ because of its location (like a joint joining the mountain and the valley). A third version refers to the “arma (chariot in Greek)” of the goddess Aphrodite, which the goddess used in order to visit these places. Due to the village's location and environment, the village has attracted many Cypriot and foreign residents.

== Transportation ==
The Tsada Golf Course – Minthis Hills is a 7 km drive from Armou. The Agia Varvara church is the only church in the village.
