= Agia Marinouda =

Agia Marinouda Αγία Μαρινούδα
- Location in Cyprus
- Coordinates: 34°45′39″N 32°28′25″E
- Country: Cyprus
- District: Paphos District

Population (2001)
  - Total: 220
- Time zone: UTC+2 (EET)
  - Summer (DST): UTC+3 (EEST)
- Postal code: 6012

Agia Marinouda (Greek: Αγία Μαρινούδα) is a village in the Paphos District of Cyprus, located 7 km east of Paphos.
