= Chloraka =

Chloraka Χλώρακα
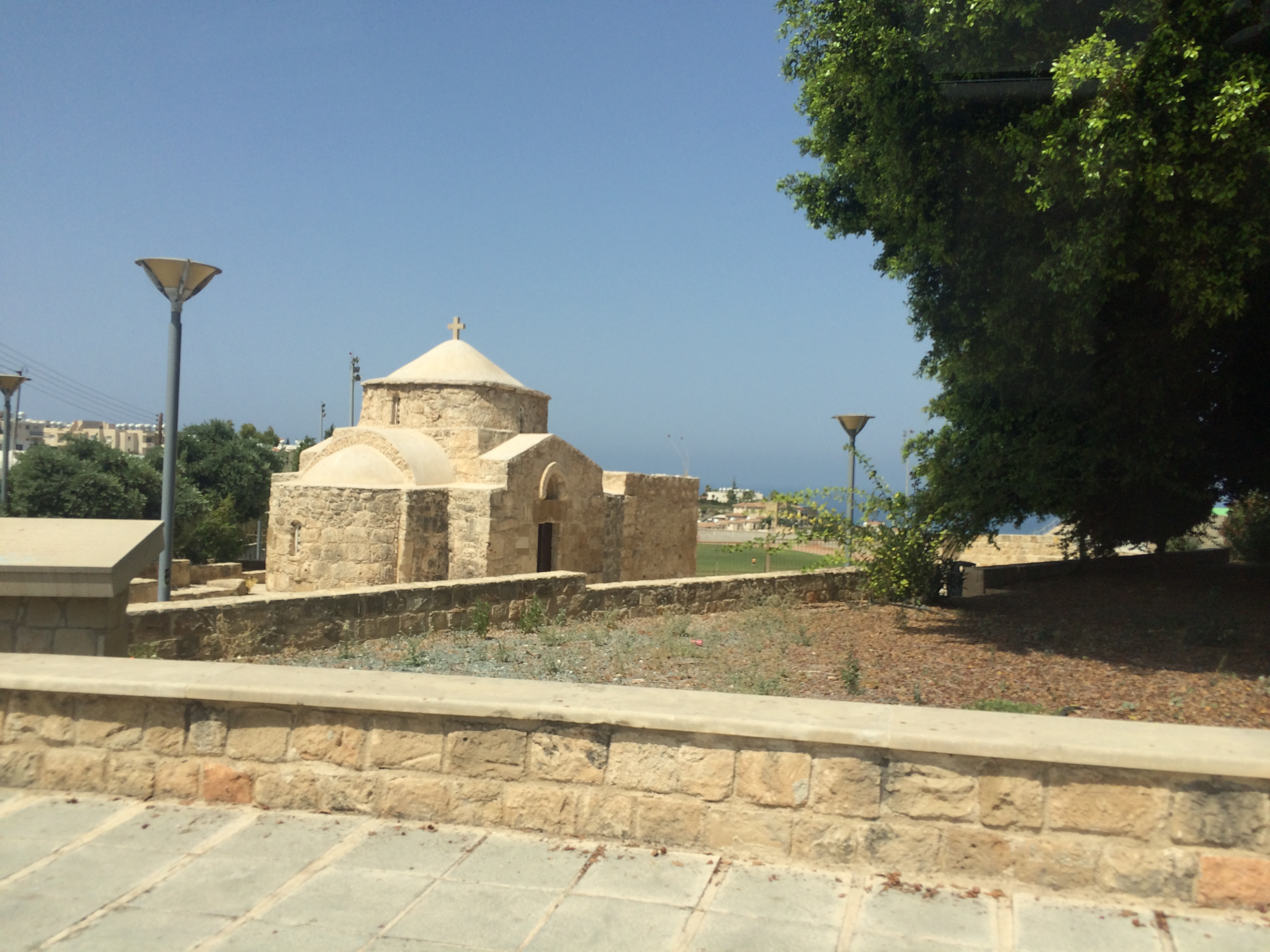

- Location in Cyprus
- Coordinates: 34°48′4″N 32°24′31″E
- Country: Cyprus
- District: Paphos District
- Elevation: 89 m (292 ft)

Population (2001)
  - Total: 4,420
- Time zone: UTC+2 (EET)
  - Summer (DST): UTC+3 (EEST)
- Postal code: 8220

Chloraka (Greek: Χλώρακα) is a village in the Paphos District of Cyprus, 3 km (1.9 mi) north of Paphos. The town is host to Akritas Chlorakas, a Cypriot First Division football team.
