= Dromolaxia =

Dromolaxia Δρομολαξιά (Greek)
- Municipality
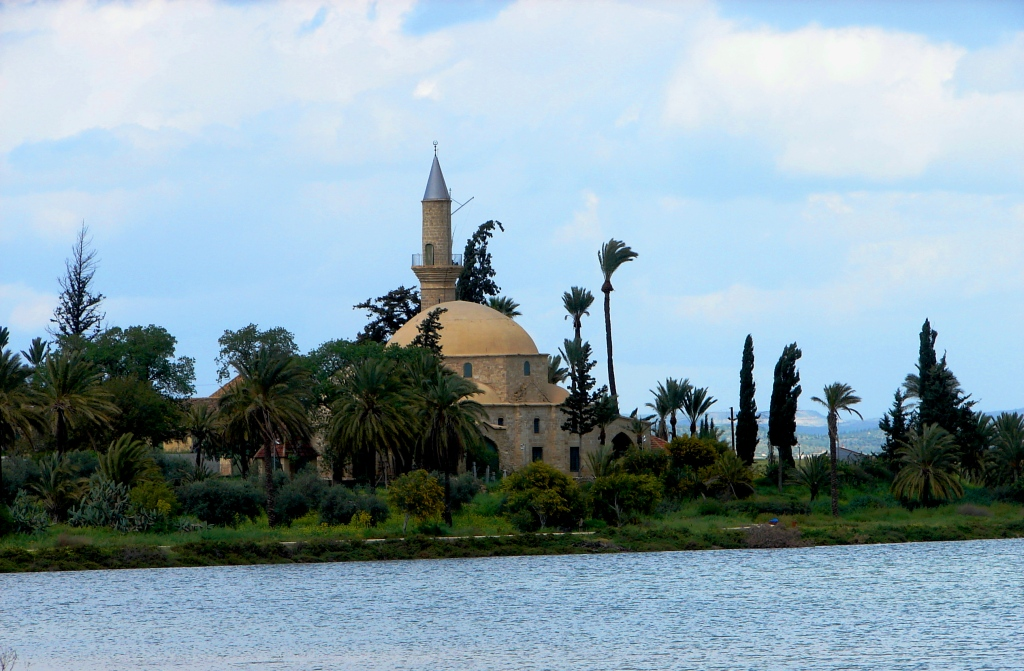
- Hala Sultan Tekke viewed from Dromolaxia across Larnaca Salt Lake

- Location within Cyprus
- Coordinates: 34°53′N 33°35′E
- Country: Cyprus
- District: Larnaca District

Population (2011)
  - Total: 5,064
- Time zone: UTC+2 (EET)
  - Summer (DST): UTC+3 (EEST)
- Website: dromolaxia-meneou.com.cy

Dromolaxia (Greek: Δρομολαξιά) is a village in the Larnaca District of Cyprus. In 2011, it had a population of 5,064. It is known for being the actual location of Larnaca International Airport, the island's main airport.

== Overview ==
According to the Larnaca District Archaeological Museum, Dromolaxia has been a settlement since the Middle Bronze Age, when it was known as Vizatzia. Archaeological excavations in 1972 pointed to a settlement dating "from Middle Cypriote III to Late Cypriote I but also from Late Cypriote IIC to IIIA and later".

Dromolaxia's local football team, Thyella, played in the Cypriot Fourth Division until the community president decided to withdraw the team from the league. It has been suggested that the team be merged with Salamina Dromolaxias, a team of refugees who settled in Dromolaxia due to the 1974 Turkish invasion of Cyprus.
