= Agios Therapon =

Agios Therapon Άγιος Θεράπων
- Village
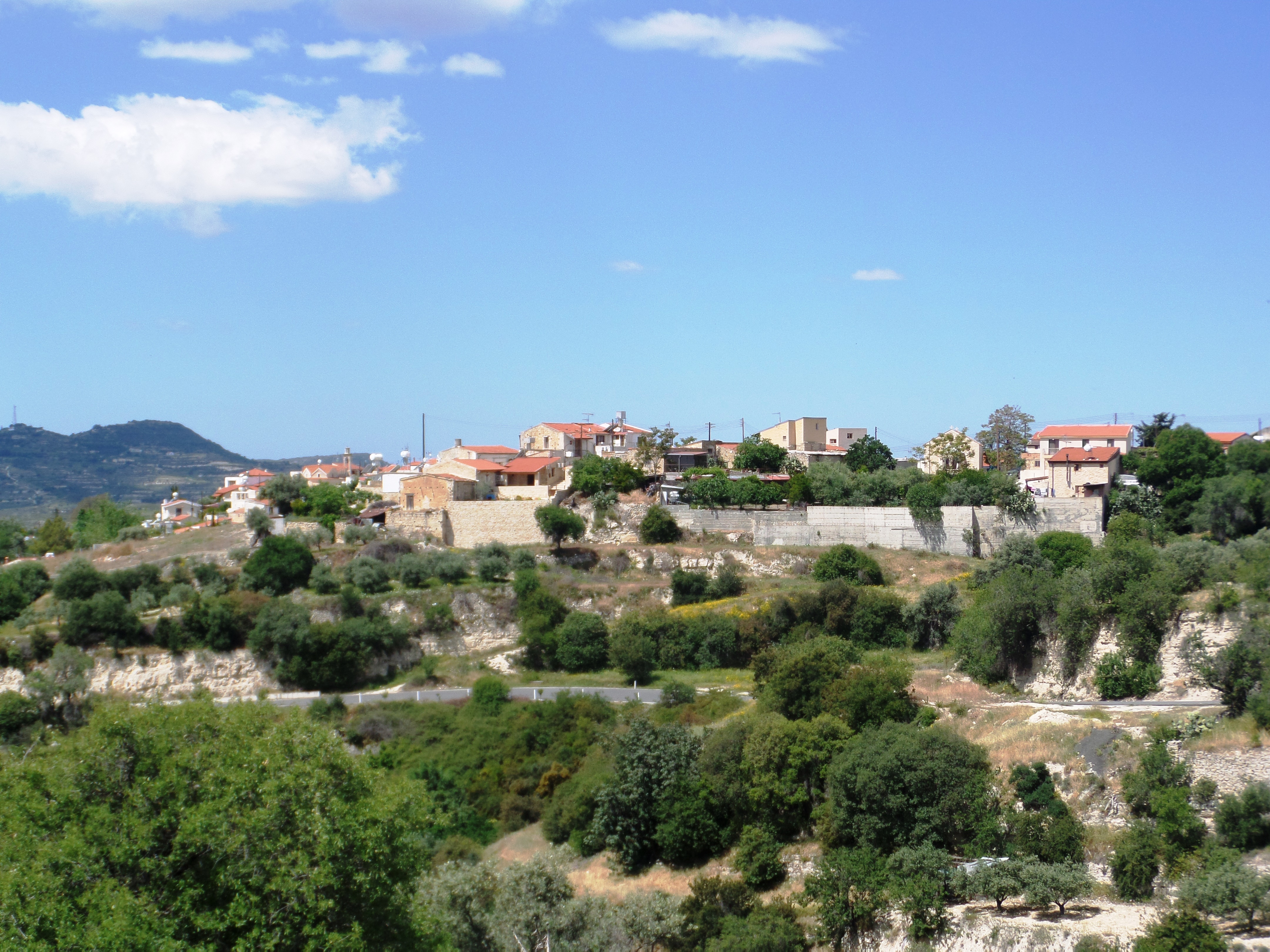

- Location in Cyprus
- Coordinates: 34°47′54″N 32°50′23″E
- Country: Cyprus
- District: Limassol District

Population (2001)
  - Total: 152
- Time zone: UTC+2 (EET)
  - Summer (DST): UTC+3 (EEST)
- Website: http://www.agiostherapon.com/

Agios Therapon (Greek: Άγιος Θεράπων) is a village in the Limassol District of Cyprus, located 20 km north of Erimi.
