= Mesogi =

Mesogi Μεσογή
- Location in Cyprus
- Coordinates: 34°48′54″N 32°27′19″E
- Country: Cyprus
- District: Paphos District
- Elevation: 306 m (1,004 ft)

Population (2001)
  - Total: 1,208
- Time zone: UTC+2 (EET)
  - Summer (DST): UTC+3 (EEST)
- Postal code: 6025

Mesogi (Greek: Μεσόγη) is a village in the Paphos District of Cyprus, located 5 km north of Paphos. It is located 306 m above sea level. It receives approximately 540 millimetres of rainfall annually. For horse riding enthusiasts, Mesogi also has a horse ranch, which offers a walk in the nature of the area, riding on the horses.
