= A22 motorway (Cyprus) =

Ringroad under construction for Nicosia District

A22 Motorway
- South Lefkosia Orbital Motorway
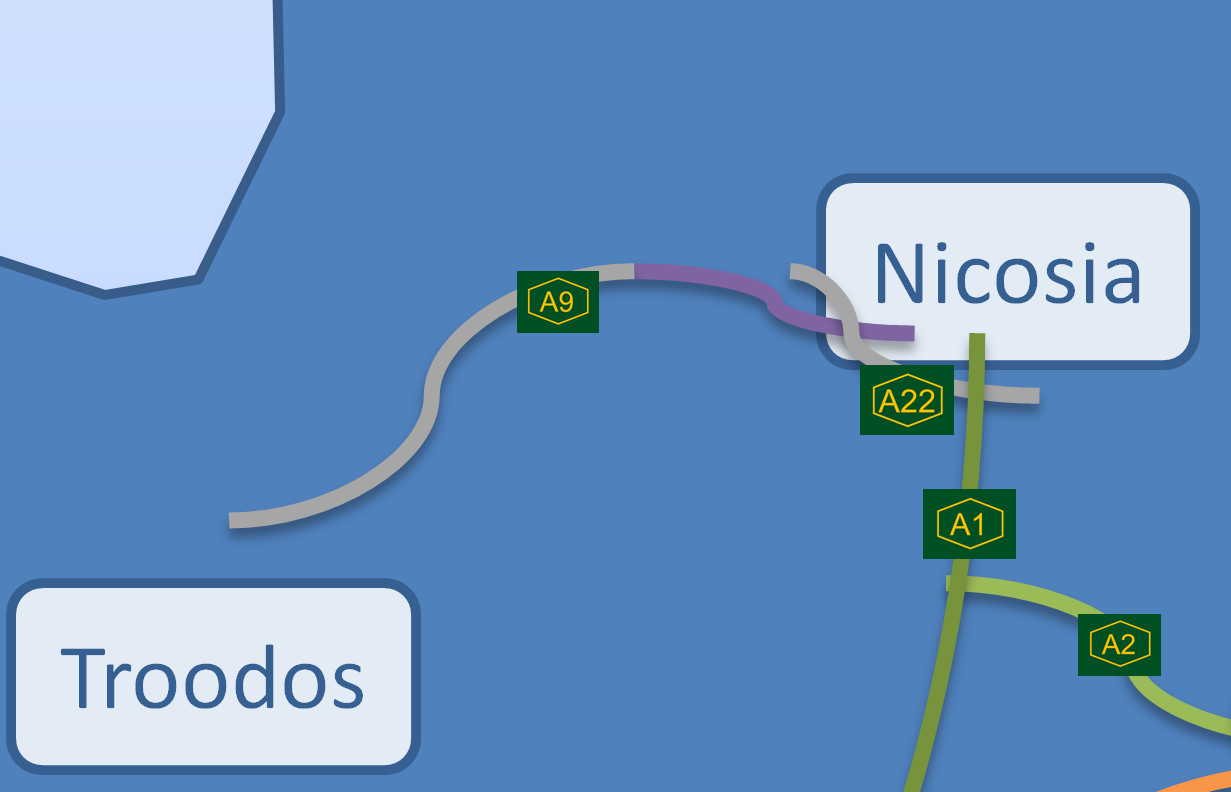
- A22 Motorway diagram

Route information
- Length: 7.5 km (4.7 mi) All Motorway Sections: 32 kilometres (20 mi)

Major junctions
- Beltway around Nicosia (Southern Suburbs)
- From: Geri Junction
- Lemesos Junction to Nicosia center and Lemesos; Cloverleaf Interchange to Nicosia Center and Agrokipia
- To: Kokkinotrimithia Cloverleaf Interchange to Troodos & Nicosia center via A9 and B9

Location
- Country: Cyprus
- Regions: Nicosia District

Highway system
- Motorways and roads in Cyprus
| ← A10 | → A1 |

The A22 is a partially constructed motorway that will be the centerpiece of the South Lefkosia Orbital Motorway project. Its construction can be considered to be sections A1, B1, B3, D and E of the greater project, which includes plans for the widening of several local roads (sections A2, A3 & B2) and phase 2 of the A10 motorway, from Anthoupolis to Anageia(section C). As of now only phase A1 of the A22 is complete, connecting the A1 motorway from Lemesos Junction to the E901. Sections B1, B3 and E will involve the westward expansion of the A22 to connect to important roads such as the E903, A10 and A9 motorway and Section D will connect Geri to the A22 from Lemesos Junction. Its construction is being overseed by the contractor Cyfield. The project is expected to cost about 350 million euros.

== Phases of Construction ==
=== Section A ===
First of the 5 stages of construction, and the only completed stage so far, having opened on 8 August 2024, with the local road improvements alongside the project having finished on 6 November 2024. The motorway section is 7.5 km long and begins at Lemesos Junction, which links the A22 to the A1 motorway with a T-shaped junction, and adds additional connections between the A1 and B1. It then bears north-west until reaching Hadjiloucas Roundabout, which it underpasses to allow frictionless traffic to the E901, but links to via grade junction; where it connects to several local roads such as Makedonis Avenue, which has been widened and extended to reach the E120 in the south. It then continues north west until reaching Saint Nicolas Roundabout where the section ends, connecting to the E901.

=== Section B ===
5.7km of motorway, of which 3.2km are tunneled underground, between the E901 and A10. Construction has been postponed until after phase 1 of the A10 is complete, and the section is expected to cost 130 million euros in total. Motorway construction divided into 2 phases, which are below

==== B1 ====
Will connect the E901 to Archebiskopou Makarios III Avenue. The roundabout where section A1 teminates has been elevated to allow the motorway to underpass/tunnel under it. From there it will bear westwards, connecting to roundabouts with Giannou Kanidioti Road (which will be extended south to Tseri) and Archebiskopou Makarios III Avenue. It will also have some one way junctions for residential traffic.

==== B3 ====
Will connect Archebiskopou Makarios III Avenue to the A10. Bears more or less north-west from the terminus of section B1 to the E903, which it overpasses and connects to via two 1km long "traffic lanes". From there it tunnels through mountainous terrain to connect to a cloverleaf interchange with the A10. It has been given funding by the EU of just over 31 million euros.

=== Section D ===
5km of motorway between Lemesos Junction, Latsia and Geri. This section has been prepared for by building stub lanes on one of the slip roads of the A22 at Lemesos Junction. From there it will bear east until reaching the road Idalliou, where 2 roundabouts and an at grade separation junction will be built. From here it bears north east until reaching the road Anexartisias, near Geri Industrial Zone, which it connects to via an at-grade intersection that connects to a roundabout. The section also entails 4km of secondary road improvements in the region, such as widening or rerouting. Stub lanes will continue somewhat further east in case of further expansion.

=== Section E ===
2.5km of motorway connecting the A10 to the A9. It consists of only 2 junctions: a cloverleaf junction with the A10 and a cloverleaf junction with the A9. 2.5km of secondary road improvements will happen in tandem with the section, mainly near junctions. Stub lanes continue somewhat further north to allow for potential expansion.
