= 2018–19 STOK Elite Division =

STOK Elite Division
- Season: 2018–19
- Champions: Iraklis (1st title)
- Promoted: Iraklis; Elia; APONA; Kormakitis
- Relegated: Rotsidis; Livadiakos
- Matches played: 180
- Goals scored: 495 (2.75 per match)
- Top goalscorer: Demetris Andreou; Frixos Karaoli (15 goals)
- All statistics correct as of 23 March 2019.

The 2018–19 STOK Elite Division is the 4th season of the Cypriot fourth-level football league.

== Format ==
Fourteen teams participated in the 2018–19 STOK Elite Division. All teams played against each other twice, once at their home and once away. The team with the most points at the end of the season crowned champions. The first three teams were promoted to the 2018–19 Cypriot Third Division and the last two teams were relegated to the regional leagues.

=== Point system ===
Teams received three points for a win, one point for a draw and zero points for a loss.

== Changes from previous season ==
Teams promoted to 2018–19 Cypriot Third Division

- Kouris Erimis
- Omonia Psevda
- Amathus Ayiou Tychona

Teams relegated from 2017–18 Cypriot Third Division

- APEP FC
- Finikas Ayias Marinas Chrysochous
- Livadiakos/Salamina Livadion

Teams promoted from regional leagues

- AEK Korakou
- APONA Anageias
- ASPIS Pylas
- Kormakitis FC

Teams relegated to regional leagues

- Elpida Xylofagou
- Frenaros FC 2000
- Kornos FC 2013
- Poseidonas Giolou

== Stadiums and locations ==
Locations of the 2018–19 STOK Elite Division teams.

Club	Venue
AEK Korakou	Korakou Municipal Stadium
AEN	Olympos Acheritou Stadium
APEP	Kyperounda Community Stadium
APONA Anageias	Anageia–Deftera Municipal Stadium
ASPIS Pylas	Pyla Municipal Stadium
Atlas Aglandjias	Aglandjia Municipal Stadium
Doxa	Doxa Paliometochou Stadium
Elia	Elia Lythrodonta Stadium
Finikas Ayias Marinas Chrysochous	Ayia Marina Chrysochous Community Stadium
Iraklis	THOI Lakatamia Stadium
Kormakitis FC	Kokkinotrimithia Municipal Stadium
Livadiakos/Salamina Livadion	Ayia Pasaskevi Livadion Municipal Stadium
Orfeas	Orfeas Stadium
Rotsidis	Rotsidis Mammari Stadium

== League standings ==
Pos	Team	Pld	W	D	L	GF	GA	GD	Pts	Qualification or relegation
1	Iraklis Gerolakkou (C, P)	26	17	2	7	56	33	+23	53	Promotion to Cypriot Third Division
2	Elia Lythrodonta (P)	26	14	5	7	40	26	+14	47	Promotion to Cypriot Third Division
3	APONA Anageias (P)	26	14	4	8	48	20	+28	46	Promotion to Cypriot Third Division
4	Kormakitis FC (P)	26	12	7	7	31	23	+8	43	Promotion to Cypriot Third Division
5	AEK Korakou	26	12	6	8	36	28	+8	42	
6	AEN Ayiou Georgiou Vrysoullon-Acheritou	26	12	4	10	39	35	+4	40 (Note: Head to head record: AEN Vrysoullon 4–1 APEP, APEP 0–0 AEN Vrysoullon.)	
7	APEP FC	26	11	7	8	41	29	+12	40	
8	ASPIS Pylas	26	9	6	11	32	33	−1	33 (Note: Head to head record: ASPIS: 10 points, Orfeas: 7 points, Finikas: 7 points, Doxa: 5 points.)	
9	Orfeas Nicosia	26	7	12	7	37	36	+1	33	
10	Finikas Ayias Marinas Chrysochous	26	9	6	11	32	37	−5	33	
11	Doxa Paliometochou	26	10	3	13	27	43	−16	33	
12	Atlas Aglandjias	26	11	2	13	36	38	−2	35	
13	Rotsidis Mammari (R)	26	8	8	10	41	38	+3	32	Relegation to the regional leagues
14	Livadiakos/Salamina Livadion (Note: On 11 September 2018, Livadiakos/Salamina Livadion informed Cyprus Football Association (CFA) that they are unable to participate in the league.) (R)	26	0	0	26	0	78	−78	0	Relegation to the regional leagues

Source: CFA
Rules for classification: 1) Points; 2) Head-to-head points; 3) Head-to-head goal difference; 4) Head-to-head goals scored; 5) Head-to-head away goals scored (only if two teams); 6) Goal difference; 7) Goals scored; 8) Play-off (only if deciding championship round, relegation round or relegation).
(C) Champions; (P) Promoted; (R) Relegated

== Results ==
Home \ Away	AEK	AEN	APEP	APO	ASP	ATL	DOX	ELI	FIN	IRA	KOR	LSL	ORF	ROT
AEK Korakou	—	2–1	0–1	1–0	0–3	4–1	0–1	0–0	0–0	4–3	0–2	3–0	4–2	1–1
AEN Ayiou Georgiou Vrysoullon-Acheritou	2–0	—	4–1	1–1	1–0	2–4	2–1	1–0	4–2	0–1	2–0	3–0	2–2	2–3
APEP FC	1–1	0–0	—	1–1	4–0	1–2	1–2	0–0	3–1	0–2	0–0	3–0	2–2	2–0
APONA Anageias	3–2	5–1	2–0	—	1–1	2–1	7–0	1–2	3–0	1–2	0–0	3–0	0–1	3–0
ASPIS Pylas	2–1	1–0	0–3	1–2	—	1–0	2–0	0–1	1–1	0–2	0–1	3–0	2–2	2–4
Atlas Aglandjias	0–2	0–1	2–0	1–0	1–0	—	0–1	5–2	0–2	1–0	1–0	3–0	3–1	1–1
Doxa Paliometochou	0–1	1–0	1–5	0–1	2–4	1–0	—	1–1	0–0	0–4	0–2	3–0	1–1	2–1
Elia Lythrodonta	2–1	0–1	1–0	1–0	3–2	3–0	5–2	—	1–3	0–2	3–0	3–0	3–1	1–1
Finikas Ayias Marinas Chrysochous	0–1	1–0	2–3	0–3	1–1	3–2	1–0	1–0	—	1–3	0–1	3–0	1–2	1–0
Iraklis Gerolakkou	1–2	5–2	1–2	2–1	2–1	4–3	1–0	2–2	3–2	—	2–3	3–0	3–0	1–3
Kormakitis FC	1–2	0–1	2–1	1–0	0–0	2–1	2–1	0–1	3–3	2–0	—	3–0	0–2	2–2
Livadiakos/Salamina Livadion	0–3	0–3	0–3	0–3	0–3	0–3	0–3	0–3	0–3	0–3	0–3	—	0–3	0–3
Orfeas Nicosia	0–0	1–1	2–2	0–1	1–1	3–0	1–2	2–1	0–0	2–2	0–0	3–0	—	0–0
Rotsidis Mammari	1–1	4–2	1–2	1–4	0–1	1–1	1–2	0–1	3–0	1–2	1–1	3–0	5–3	—

Source: Cyprus Football Association
Legend: Blue = home team win; Yellow = draw; Red = away team win.
For upcoming matches, an "a" indicates there is an article about the rivalry between the two participants.

== Sources ==
- "Results". Cyprus Football Association.
- "Scorers". Cyprus Football Association.

== See also ==
- STOK Elite Division
- 2018–19 Cypriot First Division
- 2018–19 Cypriot Second Division
- 2018–19 Cypriot Third Division
- 2018–19 Cypriot Cup for lower divisions
