= B22 road (Cyprus) =

Avenue/Ringroad in Nicosia

B22
- Spyrou Kyprianou Avenue; Σπύρου Κυπριανού
- B22 at the center in red

Route information
- Length: 7 km (4.3 mi) With K022 10.5 kilometres (7 mi)

Major junctions
- Beltway around Nicosia
- From: Athalassa Park
- Hospital Roundabout to Latsia; Mercedes-Benz Roundabout to Limassol or Central Nicosia
- To: Kykklikos Komvos Archangelou to Troodos & Nicosia center

Location
- Country: Cyprus

Highway system
- Motorways and roads in Cyprus
← B20	→ B1

The B22, also known as Spyrou Kyprianou Avenue, is an important avenue in Nicosia, Cyprus, that goes around the south of the capital. It provides connections to many different roads that enter into central Nicosia, such as the A1, A9 and E901 and as such is used as a ringroad by people entering the city, to reach different neighbourhoods or to enter the center on less congested roads. It is dual-carriageway, much like Cyprus's motorways, but unlike them has many at-grade junctions and some traffic lights. Recently the road was extended westwards from the B1 towards the secondary road E119, north of the town of Geri, to provide drivers on the A1 a new way to enter the city and to provide residents of Geri with an easier way to go to different neighbourhoods of Nicosia. This part of the project is however not fully considered part of the B22, it being called the K022. Two projects are underway to alleviate traffic on the B22, those being the A22 motorway and Fillipou Papakyprianou Avenue (a new dual-carriageway beltway around Nicosia that is under construction).
