= Apostolou Pavlou Avenue =

Road in Cyprus

Apostolou Pavlou Avenue
- Λεωφόρος Αποστόλου Παύλου
- B20 in the bottom left of the map in red

Route information
- Length: 2.6 km (1.6 mi)

Major junctions
- From: Kenedy Square
- To: Paphos Promenade

Location
- Country: Cyprus
- Major cities: Paphos

Highway system
- Motorways and roads in Cyprus
← B18	→ B22

Apostolou Pavlou Avenue (otherwise known as the B20) is an avenue in the city of Paphos that connects the B7 and B6 to downtown Paphos. It is an urban single carriageway road, with some traffic lights and exclusively at-grade junctions such as crossroads or roundabouts.

== Major Junctions ==
No.	Area	Connections
1	Kenedy Square	B7 highway logo B6 highway logo
2	Ivis Maliotou Park	E706
3	Paphos	Agapinoros, Georgia Christophorou
4	Paphos	Adamantiou Korai, Morpheos
5	Paphos	E701, Agion Anargeion Avenue
6	Kato Paphos	Lidas
7	Paphos Promenade	Unclassified Roads to Promenade
