= Korakou =

Korakou may refer to:

- Korakou (Corinthia), an archaeological site
- Korakou (Cyprus), a village
  - AEK Korakou, a football club
