= 2018–19 Cypriot Cup for lower divisions =

Tournament details
- Country: Cyprus
- Dates: 24 October 2018 – 8 May 2019
- Teams: 22

Final positions
- Champions: Digenis Morphou (2nd title)
- Runners-up: Olympias Lympion

The 2018–19 Cypriot Cup for lower divisions was the 11th edition of the Cypriot Cup for lower divisions. A total of 22 clubs entered the competition. It began on 24 October 2018 with the first round and concluded on 8 May 2019 with the final which was held at AEK Arena. Digenis Morphou won their 2nd cup trophy after beating Olympias Lympion, in the final.

== Format ==
Only teams from the Cypriot Third Division and STOK Elite Division could participate. Participation was not compulsory. 22 of 30 participated this season.

The competition consisted of five rounds. In the first, second and third round each tie was played as a single leg and was held at the home ground of one of the two teams, according to the draw results. Each tie winner was qualifying for the next round. If a match was drawn, extra time was following. If extra time was drawn, there was a replay at the ground of the team who were away for the first game. If the rematch was also drawn, then extra time was following and if the match remained drawn after extra time the winner was decided by penalty shoot-out.

The fourth round was played in a two-legged format, each team playing a home and an away match against their opponent. The team which scored more goals on aggregate was qualifying for the next round. If the two teams scored the same number of goals on aggregate, then the team which scored more goals away from home was advancing to the next round.

If both teams had scored the same number of home and away goals, then extra time was following after the end of the second leg match. If during the extra thirty minutes both teams had managed to score, but they had scored the same number of goals, then the team who scored the away goals was advancing to the next round (i.e. the team which was playing away). If there weren't scored any goals during extra time, the qualifying team was determined by penalty shoot-out.

The final will be a single match.

== First round ==
The first round draw took place on 9 October 2018 and the matches played on 24 October 2018.

Team 1	Score	Team 2
(D) Elia Lythrodonta	1–3	Kouris Erimis (C)
(C) Omonia Psevda	6–0	Elpida Astromeriti (C)
(D) APONA Anageias	1–0	Doxa Paliometochou (D)
(D) Orfeas Nicosia	1–2	Achyronas Liopetriou (C)
(D) Kormakitis	0–2	Peyia 2014 (C)
(C) Olympias Lympion	2–1	APEA Akrotiriou (C)

== Round of 16 ==
The round of 16 draw, took place on 11 December 2018 and the matches played on 16 and 23 January 2019.

Team 1	Score	Team 2
(C) Digenis Morphou	3–0	Achyronas Liopetriou (C)
(D) Rotsidis Mammari	1–4	Chalkanoras (C)
(C) Kouris Erimis	2–1	Ethnikos Assia (C)
(D) APONA Anageias	1–4	Olympias Lympion (C)
(C) APEP	2–1	Peyia 2014 (C)
(C) Omonia Psevda	3–3 (3–1 p)	P.O. Xylotymbou (C)
(C) ENY-Digenis Ipsona	1–1 (4–3 p)	Ormideia (C)
(C) Ethnikos Latsion	0–2	ENAD Polis Chrysochous (C)

== Quarter-finals ==
The quarter-finals draw took place on 30 January 2019 and the matches played on 20, 27 February 2019.

Team 1	Score	Team 2
(C) ENY-Digenis Ipsona	3–1	Chalkanoras (C)
(C) APEP	2–3	Omonia Psevda (C)
(C) Digenis Morphou	3–3 (4–2 p)	Kouris Erimis (C)
(C) Olympias Lympion	1–0	ENAD Polis Chrysochous (C)

== Semi-finals ==
The semi-finals draw took place on 6 March 2019 and the matches were played on 27 March and 3 April 2019.

Team 1	Agg.	Team 2	1st leg	2nd leg
(C) Olympias Lympion	2–2 (a)	Omonia Psevda (C)	1–0	1–2
(C) Digenis Morphou	1–0	ENY-Digenis Ipsona (C)	1–0	0–0

== Final ==
8 May 2018
19:00 EEST

Digenis Morphou	3–1	Olympias Lympion
Triantafillakis 21'; Xatzisavvas 24'; Evthimiou 42'	Report	Georgiou 80'

AEK Arena, Larnaca
