= A10 motorway (Cyprus) =

Motorway under construction in Cyprus

A10 Motorway
- Nicosia - Palaichori

Major junctions
- From: Anthoupolis Roundabout
- Cloverleaf Inerchange
- To: Agrokipia

Location
- Country: Cyprus
- Regions: Nicosia District

Highway system
- Motorways and roads in Cyprus
← A9	→ A22

The A10 is a motorway under construction in Nicosia, Cyprus. When completed it will connect the city of Nicosia to Palaichori, and will feature connections to the A9 and A22 motorways. Construction has been split into two phases: phase 1 will be 8 kilometres (5.0 mi) of motorway between Anageia and Agrokipia; and phase 2 will connect Anthoupolis Roundabout to the village of Anageia, as part of section C of the South Nicosia Orbital Motorway project. On sections where the E903 will remain the road will still be maintained. Construction of phase 1 began in March 2023 and is expected to finish by 2030, despite some delays.

Phase 1 of the A10 will be an 8-kilometre-long (5.0 mi) motorway between Anageia and Agrokipia which will be constructed alongside 8.5 kilometres (5.3 mi) of secondary road improvements, mainly of the E903, the current Nicosia–Palaichori road. Special features include two at-grade junctions at Ergates Industrial and a bridge. On 25 January 2023, a contract was signed for the construction of the phase with a time frame of 42 months and a cost of €71.4 million.

Phase 2 is also known as phase C of the South Lefkosia Orbital Motorway, and will link up Anthoupolis Roundabout on the A9 motorway with phase 1 outside the village of Anageia. It will have four at-grade junctions. It will utilise the existing dual carriageway section of the E903 leading up to Anthoupolis Roundabout. Where this dual carriageway section now ends will be a grade separated roundabout for the motorway to pass through and continue on to a new alignment which it will stay on until reaching Anageia, where it will connect to the E929 and phase 1 of the project. On this new alignment a cloverleaf interchange will be built to connect the A10 with the A22. This section has been given a grant of just over €43 million from the European Commission. The contract for this phase was signed on 25 January 2023 at a price of €71.4 million for a 42-month-long project, meaning renewal, expiration or completion of the project will occur in July 2026.
