= A7 motorway (Cyprus) =

Motorway under construction between Paphos and Polis

A7 Motorway
- Paphos – Polis
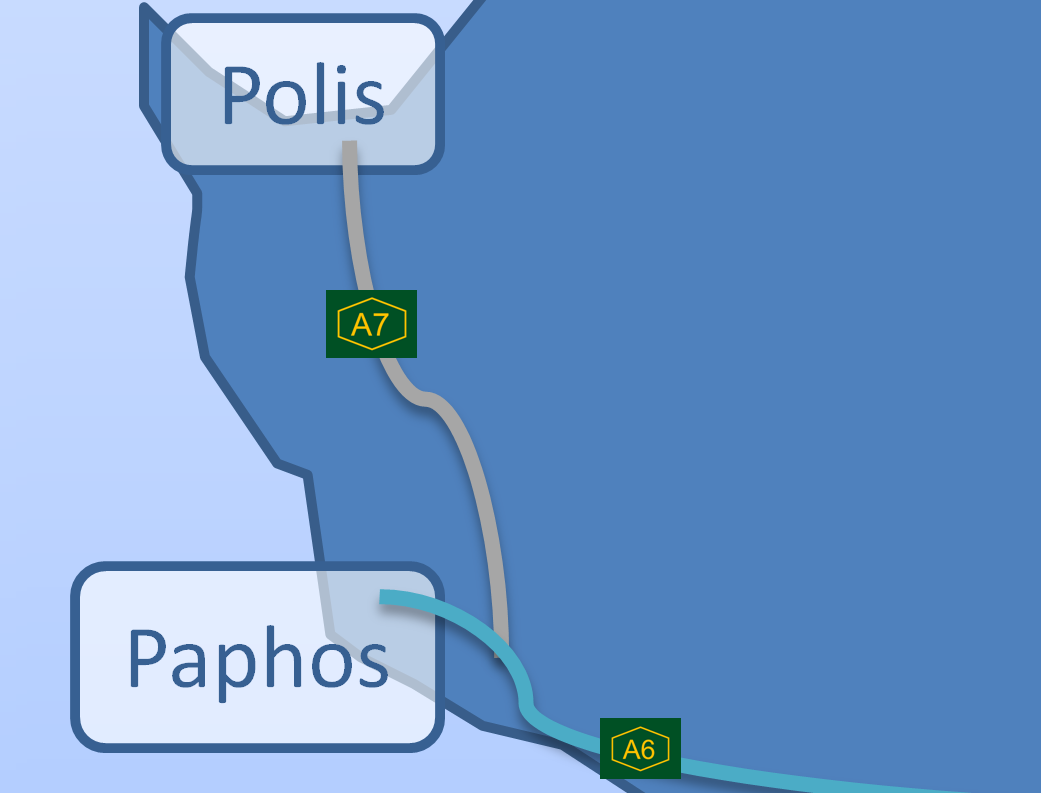
- A7 Motorway diagram

Major junctions
- From: Agia Marinouda Interchange
- To: New Polis Junction

Location
- Country: Cyprus
- Regions: Paphos District

Highway system
- Motorways and roads in Cyprus
← A6	→ A8

The A7 is a motorway that is under construction between the city of Paphos and the municipality of Polis.

== Construction and financing ==
It is the first motorway in Cyprus to be built through the Design, Build, Finance and Operate (DBFO) method. After several delays, designs were finalised, and offers to construct the motorway were made by five construction consortia. Although at first it was decided that the consortium "Kinyras" was preferred, Kinyras raised its financial demands for the project, citing increased costs due to the 2008 financial crisis, which the government refused to pay, moving to the second preferred consortium: the Austrian-Cypriot Strabag-Nemesis consortium.

As of 2024, 30% of the motorway was completed, but a new contractor was sought out, with the motorway to be completed by 2031.

== Project details ==
The A7 will be the most expensive road project ever held by the Republic of Cyprus, with expected costs lying at 447 million euros. Plans include 3 tunnels, 7 bridges, 8 grade-separated interchanges and 25 underpasses. Construction is expected to take four to five years. When complete, the motorway will branch off the A6 right after a current junction at Anatoliko Industrial Zone, and bear north. It will then bear east of Armou and Marathounta, then west of the Minthis Hills Golf Resort, and reach Stroumpi, where it will merge into the existing B7 road. Here, the road will have two lanes until its terminus at Polis.
