= Kalo Chorio (Çamlıköy) train station =

Railway station in Cyprus

Kalo Chorio or Çamlıköy was the western terminus of the Cyprus Government Railway. It was built in an uninhabited area on the southeastern outskirts of Çamlıköy in 1905.
