= B8 road (Cyprus) =

Cyprus main road

B8
- Limassol - Troodos Road; Δρόμος Λεμεσός - Τρόοδος
- B8 in Red

Major junctions
- South end: Archepiskopu Makariou III , Lemesos
- Troodos Roundabout
- North end: Troodos

Location
- Country: Cyprus
- Regions: Limassol District
- Major cities: Limassol

Highway system
- Motorways and roads in Cyprus
← B7	→ B9

The B8 is a main road in Cyprus that connects the city of Limassol to settlements in the Troödos Mountains. Although it is generally well maintained, accidents along its route, particularly at a sharp bend near the village of Moniatis are frequent. Due to rush hour traffic from Palodia to Limassol, a new four lane road was proposed to be built as section 1 of the A8. Construction of this new road began in 2020.
