= Kedros Kormakiti =

- Founded: 1972
- Dissolved: 1989

Kedros Kormakiti was a Cypriot association football club based in Kormakiti, located in the Keryneia District. Its colours were green, red and white. It has 4 participations in Cypriot Fourth Division. On 1989 merged with Libanos Kormakiti to form Kormakitis FC.
