= A6 motorway (Cyprus) =

A6 Motorway
- Limassol – Paphos
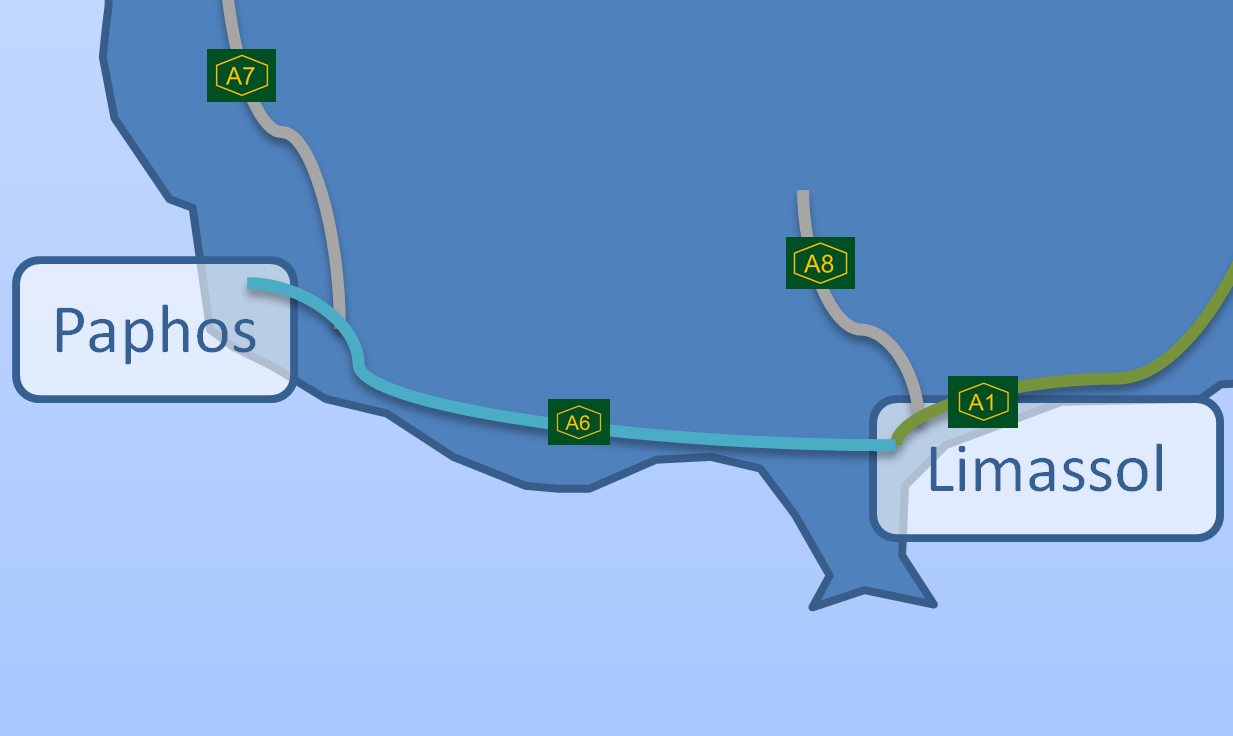
- A6 Highway diagram

Route information
- Length: 66 km (41 mi)

Major junctions
- From: Polemidia and Troodos Junction (Limassol)
- Anatoliko Interchange to Polis (under construction)
- To: Konia Roundabout

Location
- Country: Cyprus
- Regions: Limassol District, Paphos District

Highway system
- Motorways and roads in Cyprus
← A5	→ A7

The A6 is a motorway in Cyprus that runs between Limassol and Paphos. The motorway was completed in 2006 along with updates to the Polemidia and Troodos Junctions. This project completed a four-lane motorway network connecting all of the major cities in Cyprus.

The motorway passes through the Akrotiri Sovereign Base area. In this area, there are two 950 m (3,120 ft) two-lane tunnels (one in each direction). These are the only public road tunnels in Cyprus.

The motorway also has a 110-metre-tall (360 ft), 550-metre-long (1,800 ft) bridge near Petra Tou Romiou.

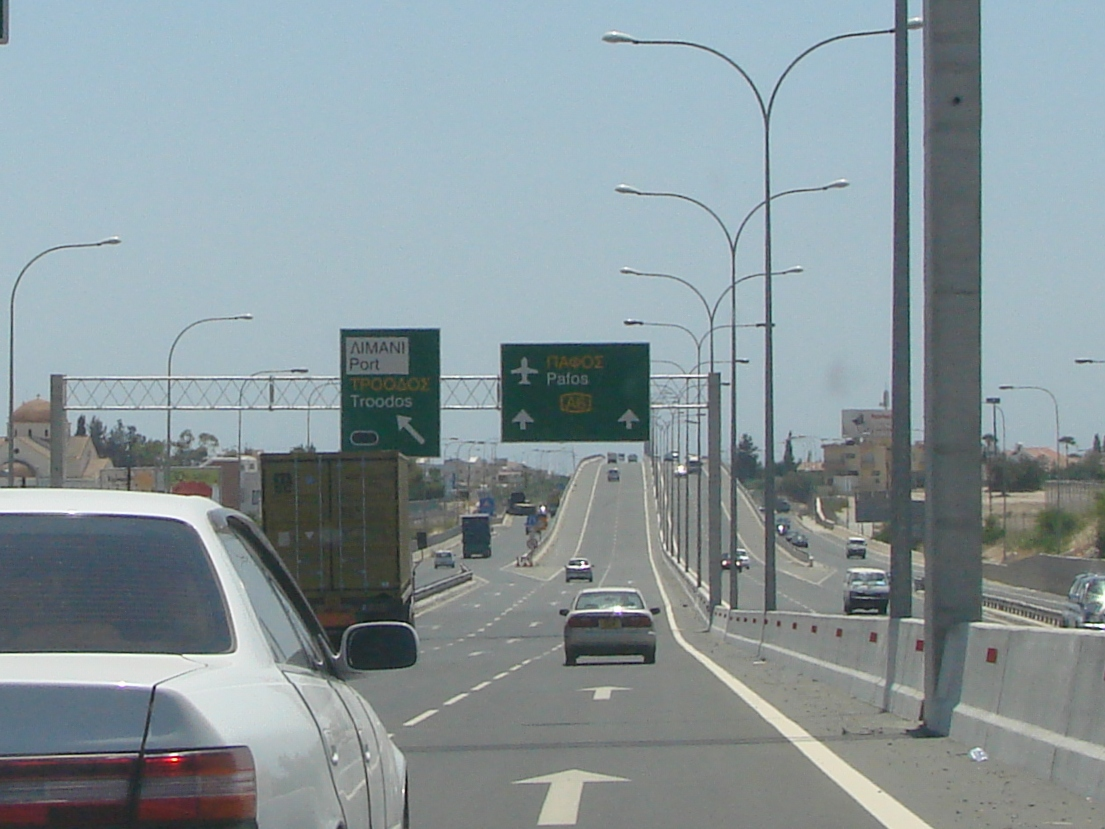
The A6 Motorway towards Paphos (2007)
