= B6 road (Cyprus) =

Single carriage road between Limassol and Paphos

B6
- Lemesos - Paphos Road
- B6 in red

Route information
- Length: 66 km (41 mi)

Location
- Country: Cyprus
- Regions: Limassol District, Pafos District

Highway system
- Motorways and roads in Cyprus
← B5	→ B7

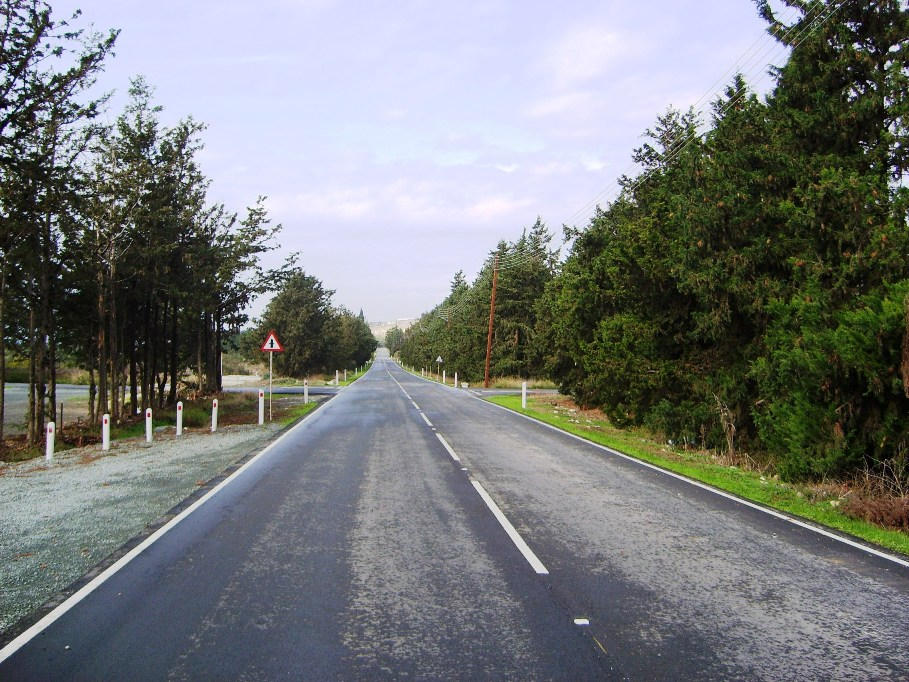
The B6 near Kouklia

The B6 road connects Cyprus's second largest city and major seaport Limassol and tourist destination Paphos.

== History ==
After Cyprus's capital moved from Paphos to Nicosia after Roman times, transportation to and from Paphos — a small town at the time — was difficult due to Cyprus's mountainous southwestern coast.

Until British colonial times, people used the sea to avoid the long and dangerous path connecting the two areas. Around 1890, the first road between Limassol and Paphos was built. It stretched 80km and was 10-12 feet wide. The B6 was built in 1963 on the same route as this first road.

After the Turkish invasion in 1974 and the occupation of Famagusta, the government sought to attract tourism to the rest of the island. The need for road transport was seen as necessary for this goal. The road is 66 km long, (6 km longer than the A6 motorway, a modern 4 lane highway that replaced the B6 as the main connecting route). It runs through 7 villages and parts of Akrotiri Sovereign Base.

== Status ==
After the completion of the A6 Motorway in 1996 traffic on the road decreased.

A part of the road near Pissouri passes by Petra tou Romiou, Aphrodite's birthplace in Greek mythology. This portion was closed between May 2019 and August 2025 due to land instability.
