= Kalo Chorio (Çamlıköy) =

Kalo Chorio: Καλό Χωριό (Greek); Çamlıköy (Turkish)
- Location within Cyprus
- Coordinates: 35°6′56″N 32°52′36″E
- Country (de jure): Cyprus
  - District: Nicosia District
- Country (de facto): Northern Cyprus (Note: In 1983, the Turkish Republic of Northern Cyprus unilaterally declared independence from the Republic of Cyprus. The de facto state is not recognised by any UN state except Turkey.)
  - District: Lefke District

Population (2011)
  - Total: 170
- Time zone: UTC+2 (EET)
  - Summer (DST): UTC+3 (EEST)

Kalo Chorio (Greek: Καλό Χωριό (Λεύκας); Turkish: Çamlıköy) is a village east of Lefka in Cyprus. De facto, it is under the control of Northern Cyprus.

== Etymology ==
Kalo Chorio in its Greek pronunciation ("Καλό Χωριό") roughly translates to "good village" in English. Meanwhile, in its Turkish pronunciation ("Çamlıköy"), it roughly translates to "village of pines".

== History ==
Kalo Chorio formerly had a terminus of the Cyprus Government Railway (CGR) built on the southeastern outskirts of the village. However, it would be closed following the dismantling of the CGR in December 1951.
