= Cyprus Government Railway =

- System Map

Overview
- Headquarters: Nicosia
- Reporting mark: CGR
- Locale: Cyprus
- Dates of operation: 1905–1951

Technical
- Track gauge: 2 ft 6 in (762 mm)
- Length: 76 miles (122 km)

The Cyprus Government Railway (CGR) was a 2 ft 6 in (762 mm) narrow gauge railway network that operated in Cyprus from October 1905 to December 1951. With a total length of 76 miles (122 km), there were 39 stations, stops and halts, the most prominent of which served Famagusta, Prastio Mesaoria, Angastina, Trachoni, Nicosia, Kokkinotrimithia, Morphou, Kalo Chorio and Evrychou. The CGR was closed down for financial reasons. An extension of the railway which was built to serve the Cyprus Mines Corporation operated until 1974.

== History ==
=== Background ===
When the first British High Commissioner, Sir Garnet Wolseley, arrived in Cyprus in 1878, he was keen to construct a railway on the island but the project did not come to fruition for a long time, due to the uncertainty of the length of the British mandate in Cyprus. In July 1903, Frederick Shelford – on behalf of the Crown Agents – submitted a feasibility study for the construction of a railway line that would originate at Famagusta and terminate at Karavostasi via Nicosia and Morphou, at a total cost of £141,526.

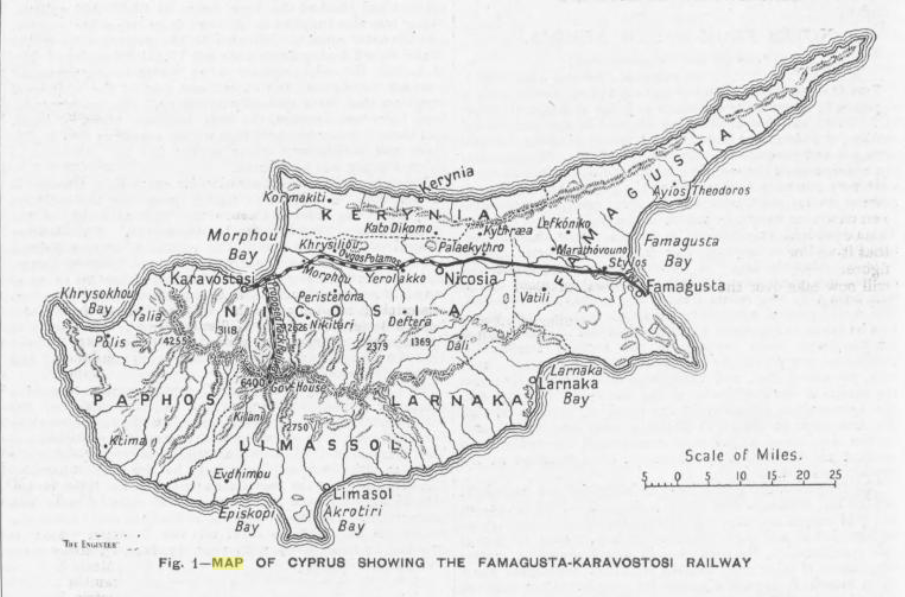
1906 map of the railroad

=== Construction ===
The proposal was approved in November 1903 and the earthworks began in May 1904; the existing line at Famagusta harbour was extended South to Varosha by 1 mile (1.6 km) and Section 1 [Famagusta-Nicosia, 36 miles (58 km)] was inaugurated on 21 October 1905 by High Commissioner, Sir Charles Anthony King-Harman. The construction of Section 2 [Nicosia-Morphou, 24 miles (39 km)] began in July 1905 and was inaugurated on 31 March 1907. However, three years later, the Railway was already operating at a loss and so an operation study for the CGR was conducted by Bedford Glasier. The study was published in January 1913 and suggested the construction of the terminus at Evrychou. So, the construction of Section 3 [Morphou-Evrychou, 15 miles (24 km)] began in November 1913 and it was inaugurated on 14 June 1915.

== Motive Power ==
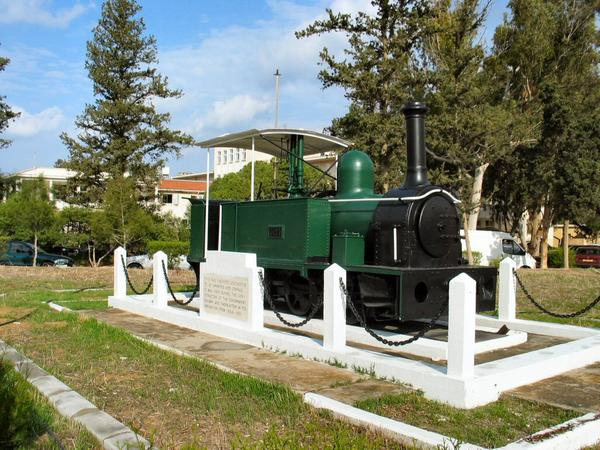
Locomotive No1 outside Famagusta Station

=== Locomotives ===
Summary of the 12 locomotives:

- No. 1 – 0-6-0T built by Hunslet Engine Company (846 of 1904)
- Nos. 11–12 – 4-4-0 built by Nasmyth Wilson and Company
- Nos. 21–23 – 2-6-0 built by Nasmyth Wilson and Company
- Nos. 31–32 – 2-6-2T built by Nasmyth Wilson and Company
- Nos. 41–44 – 4-8-4T built by Kitson and Company

=== Railcars ===
Summary of the 9 railcar units:

- 6 by D Wickham & Co
- 3 by Drewry Car Co.

== Operation and uses ==
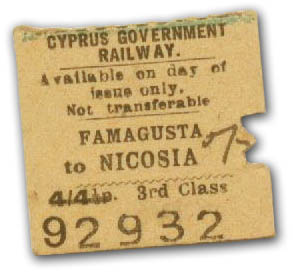
A CGR ticket

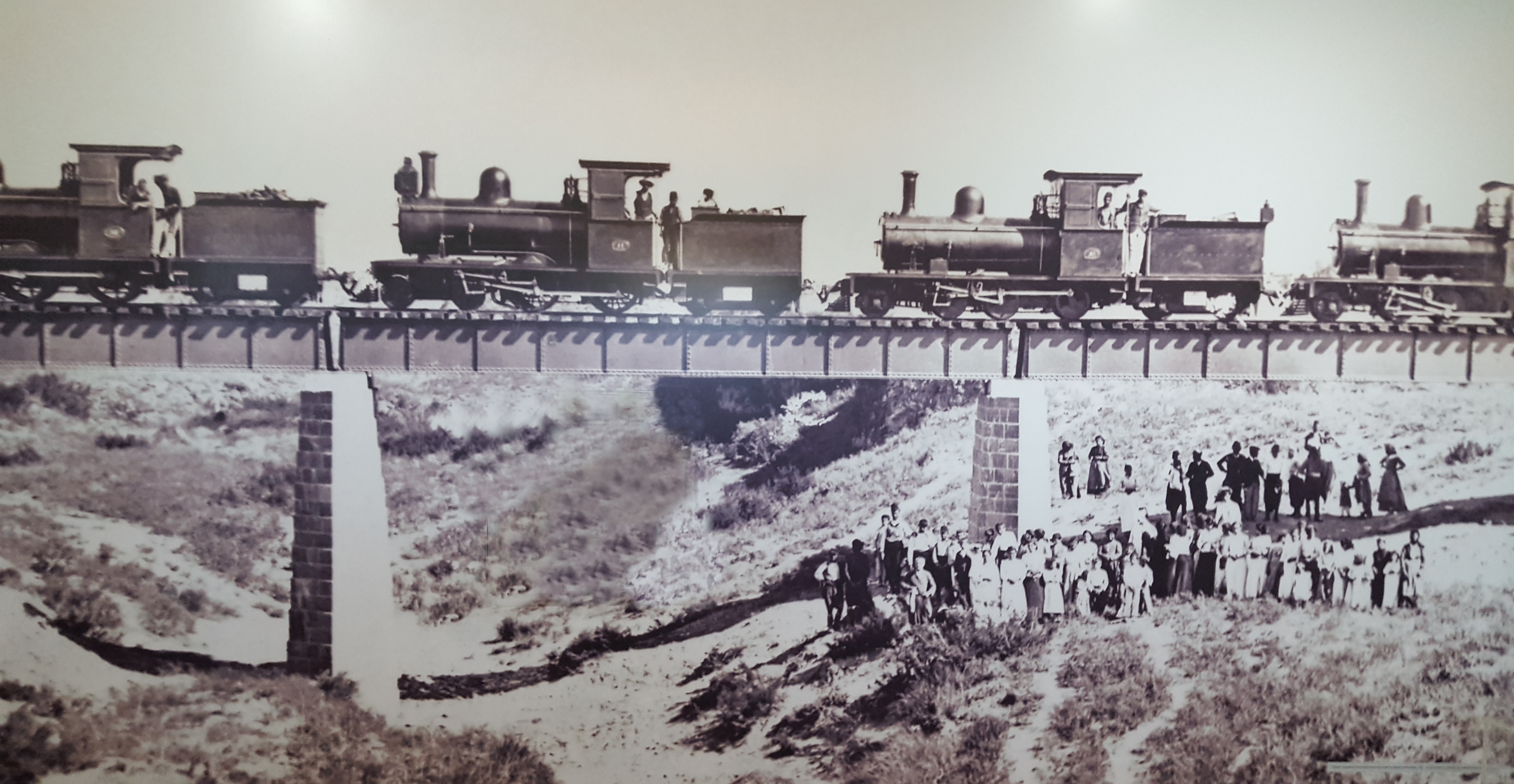
Four new Nasmyth Wilson locomotives on the bridge near Mia Milia

By the time the total 76 miles (122 km) of the CGR had been completed, running costs had spiralled to £199,367, which remained constant throughout the operation period of the line.

The Cyprus Government Railway was used in a number of ways and served both the colonial authorities and the local population. Principal operations were as follows:

- It served the port of Famagusta, as a freight transfer system.
- It transferred timber from the Troodos Mountains to towns and cities across Cyprus.
- It carried freight, ore and minerals on behalf of the Cyprus Mines Corporation.
- The local railway stations functioned as a place of exchange of goods and services, while some also operated as telephone centres, telegram offices and/or postal offices.
- CGR trains carried mail, which arrived in Famagusta via the Egyptian Khedivial Mail Line (1912–1939).

The existence of a railway in Cyprus brought many benefits to the population of Cyprus. However, during the first years of its operation, many reportedly viewed the railway as a spectacle to be viewed rather than a means of transportation. Overall, the CGR carried 3,199,934 tons of commercial goods and freight and 7,348,643 passengers during its history.

The various stations were designated by large trilingual (Greek, Turkish and English) white signs. The CGR owned a total of 12 locomotives, 17 coaches and about 100 multi-purpose wagons, 50 of which were purchased from Egypt and Palestine. The CGR employed around 200 people in total.

== Railway Stations Halts and Sidings ==
=== Harbour Section ===
- Varosha, Famagusta
- Famagusta Harbour

=== Section 1 ===
- Varosha, Famagusta
- English Halt
- Enkomi Halt
- Styllos Siding
- Prastio Station
- Gaidhouras Halt
- Pyrga Siding
- Yenagra Siding
- Vitsadha Halt
- Marathovouno Siding
- Angastina Station
- Monastir Siding
- Exometochi Halt
- Epikho Siding
- Trakhoni Station
- Mia Milea Halt
- Kaimakli Siding
- Nicosia Station

=== Section 2 ===
- Nicosia Station
- Ayios Dhometios Halt
- Nicosia Aerodrome Halt
- Yerolakkos Halt
- Kokkino Trimithia Station
- Dhenia Siding
- Peristerona Siding
- Kato-Kopia Siding
- Argaki Siding
- Morphou Station

=== Section 3 ===
- Morphou Station
- Nikitas Halt
- Baraji Halt
- Gaziveran Halt
- Pendayia Siding
- Karyotis Junction
- Kalokhorio Station
- Skouriotissa Halt
- Vlasio Halt
- Evrychou Station

== Events ==
During the 46 years of its operation, the CGR was involved in various events concerned with the modern history of Cyprus:

- During the Enosis riots in October 1931, 120 yards (110 m) of line were torn up, as the railway was regarded as a symbol of British colonial rule.
- The transportation of Allied troops to and from Famagusta, Nicosia Airport and Xeros during both World Wars.
- The track was targeted by the Axis powers during World War II.
- The railway was used for the transportation of a large number of the 50,000 Jewish refugees to Karaolos internment camps, during 1946–1949.

== Closure ==
The line never made a profit and by 1932 the Western terminus station was at Kalokhorio Lefka, while from 1948 onwards it only reached Nicosia aerodrome. After World War II the ramshackle equipment and competition from the improved road network led the Government to the decision to definitely terminate the CGR. The last train departed from Nicosia Station at 14:57 on 31 December 1951 and arrived at Famagusta at 16:38. The process of dismantling lasted up to March 1953. After an auction was announced in Cyprus Gazette, 10 of the 12 locomotives, the tracks and part of the rolling stock were sold to the company Meyer Newman & Co, for the price of £65,626. Locomotive 1 was preserved as a monument outside Famagusta Station. Most of the former CGR employees were re-employed in state services and semi-governmental organisations. Some wagons were bought by locals, acquiring novel uses, while the equipment was distributed amongst seven governmental departments. The stations were either demolished or turned into police stations (Angastina, Kokkini Trimithia) or Public Works Department warehouses (Famagusta, Nicosia); Morphou Station became a grain storehouse, while at Evrychou it operated as a sanitary centre and a forest worker dormitory.

== Heritage ==
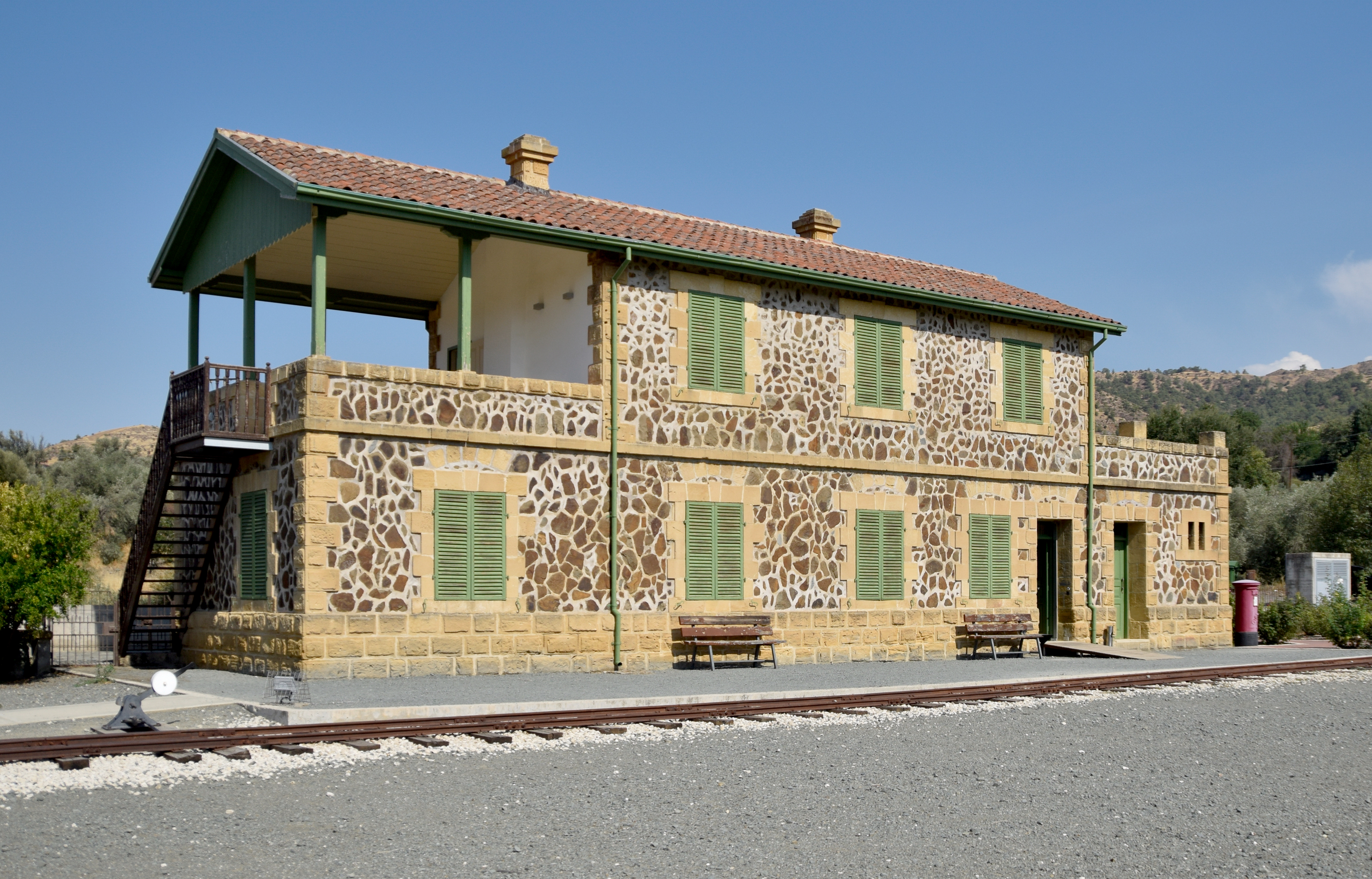
The Cyprus Railways Museum in Evrychou

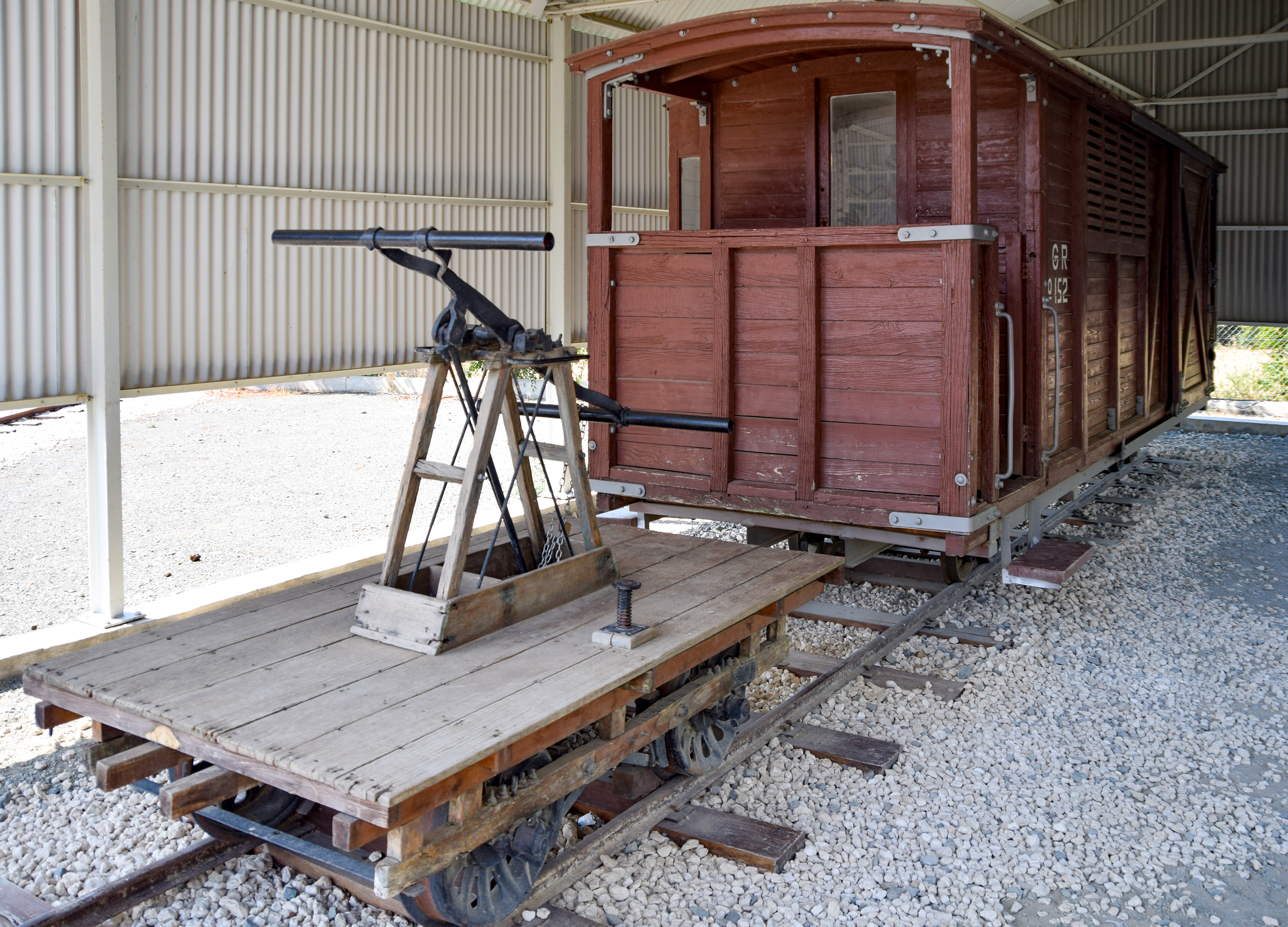
The restored wagon 152

A large part of the Nicosia-Famagusta motorway was built along the former railway track. Engine 1 can now be seen in front of the station building in Famagusta. Wagon 152 was restored and placed in the linear park in Kaimakli in 1995, then after a restoration it was moved to an exhibition featuring CGR relics in the Cultural Center of Laiki Bank in Nicosia. After a recent restoration work in 2012, this van together with a hand-powered trolley are now under a new shelter at Evrychou station with informative posters about its past and present. Evrychou station and its surroundings were rebuilt to become the Cyprus Railway Museum, with a total of about 100 metres (330 ft) of new tracks laid in 2010–2012, in a Y-shape, almost with the original 2 ft 6 in (762 mm) gauge. The museum finally opened in November 2014.

Tracks (more precisely: non-continuous portions of tracks) have also been laid in the Kaimakli area, but with different gauges: about 280 m (920 ft) with a 1,380 mm (54 11/32 in) and 18 m (59 ft) with a 595 mm (23 7/16 in) gauge from the Agiou Ilaririonos street to the West and to the East directions, respectively. There are also posters with old pictures and time-tables exhibited along this linear park in Kaimakli. In Agios Dometios, where another short portion of the former railway line near Nicosia lies to the South from the Green Line after 1974, part of the railway line has recently become a linear park and a multi-purpose centre.

== See also ==
- History of Cyprus
- Transport in Cyprus
