= A8 motorway (Cyprus) =

Highway under construction in Cyprus

A8 Motorway
- Limassol – Saittas

Major junctions
- From: Troodos Roundabout
- To: Saittas

Location
- Country: Cyprus
- Regions: Limassol District
- Major cities: Limassol

Highway system
- Motorways and roads in Cyprus
← A7	→ A9

The A8 is a motorway that will connect the city of Limassol to the village of Saittas and the Troodos Mountains

== Project phases ==
=== First phase ===
Phase 1 of the A8 project focuses on improving 3.6 kilometres (2.2 mi) of the B8 between Polemidia and Palodia. This involves the construction of essential infrastructure alongside the project; including four roundabouts, 7km of secondary road improvements and a pedestrian crossing, to connect to numerous planned projects in the area.Construction began on 19 September 2020, with completion originally slated for 13 March 2023. The project cost €26,126,000 (excluding VAT), and was opened on July 4 2025.

=== Second phase ===
The second phase of the A8 has faced postponements, with the start of construction having been delayed by one year from 2024 to 2025. Concerns have been raised on the environmental impact of the project.
