= 2018–19 Cypriot Third Division =

Cypriot Third Division
- Season: 2018–19
- Champions: Digenis Morphou (2nd title)
- Promoted: Digenis Morphou; Omonia Psevda; ENY-Digenis Ipsona; P.O. Xylotymbou
- Relegated: APEA Akrotiriou; Olympias Lympion; Ethnikos Latsion; Peyia 2014
- Matches played: 240
- Goals scored: 685 (2.85 per match)
- Top goalscorer: Andreas Ioannou (15 goals)
- All statistics correct as of 21 April 2019.

The 2018–19 Cypriot Third Division was the 48th season of the Cypriot third-level football league. Digenis Akritas Morphou won their 2nd title.

== Format ==
Sixteen teams participated in the 2018–19 Cypriot Third Division. All teams played against each other twice, once at their home and once away. The team with the most points at the end of the season crowned champions. The first four teams promoted to the 2019–20 Cypriot Second Division and the last four teams relegated to the 2019–20 STOK Elite Division.

=== Point system ===
Teams received three points for a win, one point for a draw and zero points for a loss.

== Changes from previous season ==
Teams promoted to 2018–19 Cypriot Second Division

- Onisilos Sotira
- MEAP Nisou
- Akritas Chlorakas

Teams relegated from 2017–18 Cypriot Second Division

- P.O. Xylotymbou
- Ethnikos Assia
- Chalkanoras Idaliou

Teams promoted from 2017–18 STOK Elite Division

- Kouris Erimis
- Omonia Psevda
- Amathus Ayiou Tychona

Teams relegated to 2018–19 STOK Elite Division

- APEP FC
- Finikas Ayias Marinas Chrysochous
- Livadiakos/Salamina Livadion

== Stadiums and locations ==
Locations of the 2017–18 Cypriot Third Division teams.

Club	Venue
Achyronas	Liopetri Municipal Stadium
Amathus	Ayios Tychonas Municipal Stadium
APEA Akrotiriou	Akrotiri Community Stadium
Chalkanoras	Chalkanoras Stadium
Digenis Akritas Morphou	Makario Stadium
Elpida Astromeriti	Katokopia Municipal Stadium
ENAD	Polis Chrysochous Municipal Stadium
ENY-Digenis	Stelios Chari Stadium
Ethnikos A.	Makario Stadium
Ethnikos L.	Latsia Municipal Stadium
Kouris Erimis	Erimi Municipal Stadium
Olympias Lympion	Olympias Lympion Stadium
Omonia Psevda	Psevda Arena
Ormideia FC	Ormideia Municipal Stadium
Peyia 2014	Peyia Municipal Stadium
P.O. Xylotymbou	Xylotymbou Municipal Stadium

== League standings ==
Pos	Team	Pld	W	D	L	GF	GA	GD	Pts	Qualification or relegation
1	Digenis Akritas Morphou (C, P)	30	19	5	6	62	26	+36	62	Promotion to the Cypriot Second Division
2	Omonia Psevda (P)	30	18	4	8	50	35	+15	58	Promotion to the Cypriot Second Division
3	Enosi Neon Ypsona-Digenis Ipsona (P)	30	14	11	5	52	27	+25	53	Promotion to the Cypriot Second Division
4	P.O. Xylotymbou (P)	30	14	10	6	39	25	+14	52	Promotion to the Cypriot Second Division
5	ENAD Polis Chrysochous	30	14	5	11	45	35	+10	47	
6	Ethnikos Assia	30	12	7	11	44	44	0	43 (Note: Head to head record: E. Assia 1–2 Chalkanoras, Chalkanoras 0–2 E. Assia.)	
7	Chalkanoras Idaliou	30	12	7	11	52	50	+2	43	
8	Kouris Erimis	30	11	9	10	39	39	0	42	
9	Ormideia FC	30	11	8	11	44	39	+5	41	
10	Achyronas Liopetriou	30	9	13	8	42	42	0	40	
11	Elpida Astromeriti	30	11	6	13	38	49	−11	39	
12	Amathus Ayiou Tychona	30	11	5	14	37	42	−5	38 (Note: Head to head record: Amathus 2–1 APEA, APEA 2–2 Amathus.)	
13	APEA Akrotiriou (R)	30	10	8	12	43	50	−7	38	Relegation to the STOK Elite Division
14	Olympias Lympion (R)	30	9	6	15	43	53	−10	33	Relegation to the STOK Elite Division
15	Ethnikos Latsion (R)	30	7	4	19	30	52	−22	25	Relegation to the STOK Elite Division
16	Peyia 2014 (R)	30	1	6	23	25	77	−52	9	Relegation to the STOK Elite Division

Source: CFA
Rules for classification: 1) Points; 2) Head-to-head points; 3) Head-to-head goal difference; 4) Head-to-head goals scored; 5) Head-to-head away goals scored (only if two teams); 6) Goal difference; 7) Goals scored; 8) Play-off (only if deciding championship round, relegation round or relegation).
(C) Champions; (P) Promoted; (R) Relegated

== Results ==
Home \ Away	ACH	AMA	APEA	CHA	DMO	ELP	END	ENY	ETA	ETL	KOU	OFC	OLY	OMO	PEY	POX
Achyronas Liopetriou	—	1–0	2–2	1–1	2–1	4–0	0–1	1–0	1–1	2–2	3–2	1–1	1–4	1–1	4–1	0–0
Amathus Ayiou Tychona	0–1	—	2–1	1–1	1–0	3–1	1–0	1–1	2–1	2–1	1–3	1–2	1–2	2–3	4–0	2–0
APEA Akrotiriou	1–1	2–2	—	2–0	0–1	2–0	2–0	2–2	3–1	2–1	0–1	2–0	1–1	0–1	4–0	2–1
Chalkanoras Idaliou	3–2	3–1	2–3	—	0–3	1–1	3–2	2–1	0–2	3–0	2–3	3–0	2–2	1–1	4–3	1–1
Digenis Akritas Morphou	4–1	3–0	1–1	4–1	—	3–2	3–1	2–2	2–1	1–0	1–0	2–2	4–2	4–1	2–0	0–1
Elpida Astromeriti	2–1	2–2	4–0	2–1	0–3	—	2–2	1–2	1–1	1–1	1–2	1–0	1–4	0–2	2–1	2–1
ENAD Polis Chrysochous	2–0	3–0	3–0	0–4	2–1	2–0	—	4–3	0–1	2–0	0–0	2–0	4–1	1–0	7–1	0–2
ENY-Digenis Ipsona	2–0	2–0	0–0	2–2	0–0	3–0	3–0	—	2–0	1–1	0–0	0–0	0–0	1–4	5–1	2–1
Ethnikos Assia	0–0	1–0	3–1	1–2	3–2	1–3	0–0	0–4	—	3–0	3–3	0–2	3–2	1–2	2–1	1–1
Ethnikos Latsion	2–2	0–1	3–2	0–1	0–1	1–0	1–0	0–2	2–3	—	2–1	0–4	3–1	0–1	2–0	1–3
Kouris Erimis	2–2	1–0	2–3	2–1	1–5	1–2	2–2	0–0	1–2	2–1	—	0–0	1–0	1–0	2–0	0–0
Ormideia FC	1–1	1–0	6–2	2–0	1–0	0–1	0–2	1–2	3–0	4–3	2–1	—	1–2	2–0	2–2	2–2
Olympias Lympion	0–0	2–3	3–0	2–3	0–2	0–1	1–3	2–4	0–3	1–2	1–1	4–3	—	2–1	2–1	0–2
Omonia Psevda	3–1	2–1	1–0	3–2	0–1	3–3	2–0	1–2	3–1	2–1	4–1	2–1	2–1	—	2–1	0–0
Peyia 2014	2–4	0–1	2–2	1–3	1–6	0–1	0–0	0–4	1–1	1–0	0–3	1–1	0–1	2–3	—	1–2
P.O. Xylotymbou	1–2	2–2	4–1	2–0	0–0	2–1	2–0	1–0	0–4	3–0	1–0	2–0	0–0	1–0	1–1	—

Source: Cyprus Football Association
Legend: Blue = home team win; Yellow = draw; Red = away team win.
For upcoming matches, an "a" indicates there is an article about the rivalry between the two participants.

== See also ==
- Cypriot Third Division
- 2018–19 Cypriot First Division
- 2018–19 Cypriot Second Division
