= Psimolofou =

Psimolofou: Ψιμολόφου (Greek); İbsomolof (Turkish)
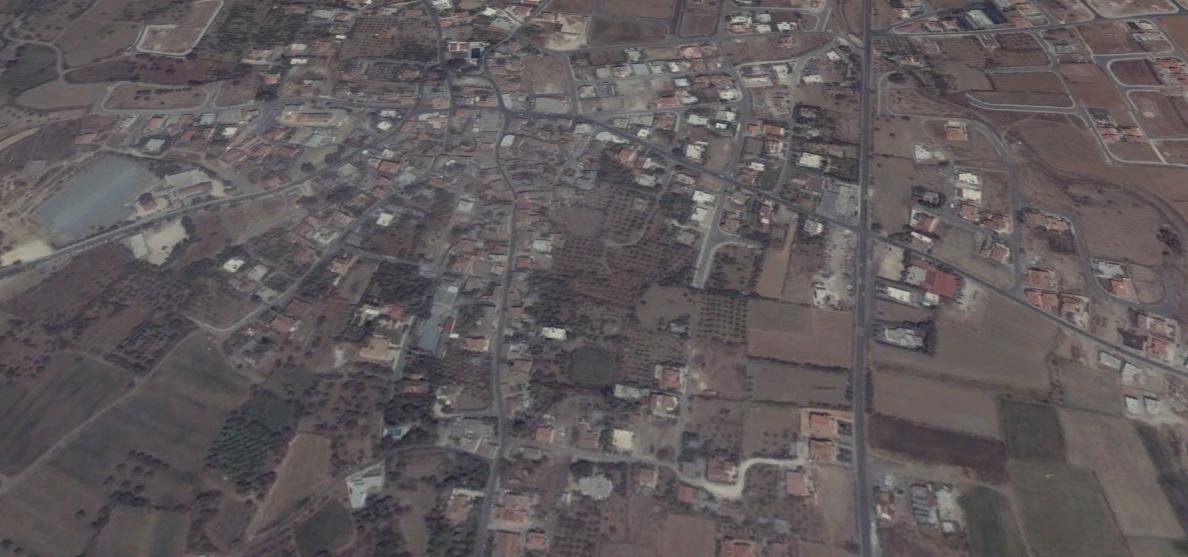
- Psimolofou Aerial View

- Location in Cyprus
- Coordinates: 35°3′38″N 33°15′36″E
- Country: Cyprus
- District: Nicosia District

Population (2011)
  - Total: 1,686
- Time zone: UTC+2 (EET)
  - Summer (DST): UTC+3 (EEST)

Psimolofou or Psimolophou (Greek: Ψιμολόφου; Turkish: İbsomolof) is a village located about 16 km from Nicosia District Capital of Cyprus, en route to the historic Machairas Monastery.

Psimolofou rests at a height of 340 meters above sea level and is surrounded by a number of perfectly flat hills. It is only 500 meters away from Padiaos river.

== Etymology ==
Psimolofou (Greek: Ψιμολόφου) derived its name from a small hill nearby which resembles a bread (Greek: ψωμί). However, most probably the name has been derived from the nearby hill - tall hill (Greek: ψηλός λόφος).

== History ==
Psimolofou was established as a small village during the 12th century AD. The historic urban center features narrow streets and very old houses made of soil and hay blocks called plinths (Greek: Πλύνθοι).

According to Jean Richard in a paper written in Melanges d'Archeologie et d'Histoire, Psimolophou was one of Cyprus's main centres for tanning, the craft practiced by Jewish tanners from the 14th century until the second half of the 20th century.

The primary church of Psimolofou was built in the 19th century over the ruins of an older church destroyed by fire. It is decorated with wall paintings; two of which were saved from the earlier building and the rest added much more recently. It is dedicated to Panayia Katholiki, known in English as the Virgin Mary.

== Modern Day ==
Psimolofou has approximately 2000 residents and has been growing steadily since the 19th century, when official records first began to be kept. Up until the 1970s, most of the inhabitants were involved with agriculture, typically growing fruits and vegetables. Today, very few inhabitants are still farmers. Most now hold jobs or have businesses in Nicosia, the capital of and largest city in Cyprus.

Psimolofou is a fast expanding residential area very near to the city; its cooler climate, especially in the summer, adds to its appeal. Psimolofou has public elementary and primary schools.

The community features several businesses and retail shops, including three traditional Cyprus coffee shops and a 24-hour, 365-day convenience store.

Near Psimolofou at 35.053094°N 33.2962°E, there is a mediumwave broadcasting station transmitting on 963 kHz the 1st programme and on 603 kHz the third programme with 100 Kilowatt. It uses a 193 metres tall guyed mast radiator - the tallest structure in Cyprus.
