= A9 motorway (Cyprus) =

Highway under construction

A9 Motorway
- Nicosia – Evrychou
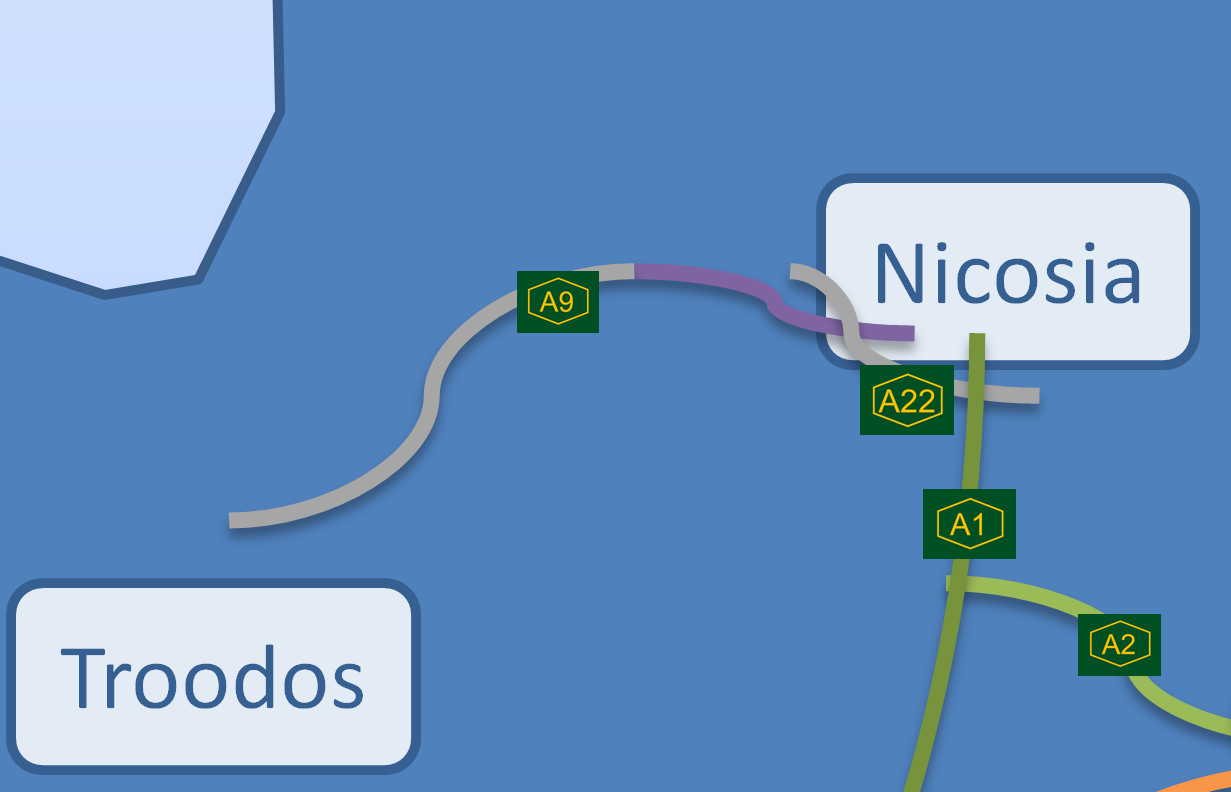
- A9 Motorway diagram

Route information
- Length: 20 km (12 mi) Planned: 65 kilometres (40 mi)

Major junctions
- From: Makedonitissa
- Kokkinotrimithia Cloverleaf interchange
- To: Troodos Junction

Location
- Country: Cyprus
- Regions: Nicosia District

Highway system
- Motorways and roads in Cyprus
← A8	→ A10

The A9 is a partially constructed motorway which, when fully complete, will connect the city of Nicosia with the village of Evrychou. Planning and construction are being undertaken in 4 phases. Currently, the motorway is completed between central Nicosia and Deneia (Phases A and B) and between Astromeritis and Evrychou (Phase D). The project is missing the section between Deneia and Astromeritis, Phase C. The final phase is currently being designed, with construction not expected to begin until at least 2027 and completion not expected until at least 2030.

Phase A was completed in the 1990s and runs between Nicosia and Kokkinotrimithia. Part of this section is an urban four-lane road between Archangelou Avenue and Anthoupolis Roundabout, which lacks a hard shoulder and has some stop-sign controlled junctions. However, it is still considered part of the A9 due to transitioning directly into the rest of the project. Before the construction of Phase B, the terminus of the A9 in Kokkinotrimithia had no roundabout and the road transitioned into the B9.

Phase B was constructed between 2003 and 2006 and links Kokkinotrimithia with Deneia. It features 3 grade-separated interchanges and terminates at a temporary junction in Deneia. From here, the road becomes a single carriageway and bears south, linking to the B9 and the village of Meniko.

Phase C, between Deneia and Astromeritis, is currently being designed as of 2026. Initially, it was supposed to pass north of the villages of Akaki and Peristerona. Instead, the single-carriageway road following the terminus of Phase B (between the interchange at Deneia and the temporary roundabout with the B9) will be upgraded to motorway standards. This includes changing the roundabout into a grade-separated interchange. From there, the motorway will follow a new alignment until reaching the start of Phase D of the project, which will be changed from an at-grade interchange to a diamond interchange with the B9.

Construction of Phase D (between Astromeritis and Evrychou) began in 2022, and the section was opened to traffic on April 30, 2026. It starts at Astromeritis, where the B9 connects to it at-grade. It terminates at an at-grade roundabout near Evrychou, with connections to the B9 and E908. It is 11.3 km long and cost €74,477,000 to construct (excluding VAT). Notable works of the project include a grade-separated diamond interchange near Koutrafas and the longest bridge in Cyprus, which is 750 metres (2,461 ft) long. It is the first section of motorway in the country to be made out of recycled asphalt.
