= 2018–19 Cypriot Second Division =

Cypriot Second Division
- Season: 2018–19
- Relegated: PAEEK; Digenis Oroklinis
- Matches: 216
- Goals: 648 (3 per match)
- Top goalscorer: David Solari (24 goals)
- Biggest home win: MEAP 10–1 THOI (2 March 2019)
- Biggest away win: Akritas 0–5 Ayia Napa (23 February 2019)
- Highest scoring: MEAP 10–1 THOI (2 March 2019)
- All statistics correct as of 24 April 2019.

The 2018–19 Cypriot Second Division is the 64th season of the Cypriot second-level football league. It began on 15 September 2018 and expect to end in April 2019.

== Format ==
Fourteen teams participated in the 2018–19 Cypriot Second Division. All teams will play against each other twice, once at their home and once away. The team with the most points at the end of the season is crowned champions. The first two teams will be promoted to the 2019–20 Cypriot First Division and the last four teams will be relegated to the 2019–20 Cypriot Third Division.

== Team changes from 2017–18 ==
Teams promoted to 2018–19 Cypriot First Division

- Enosis Neon Paralimni

Teams relegated from 2017–18 Cypriot First Division

- Olympiakos Nicosia
- Aris Limassol
- Ethnikos Achna

Teams promoted from 2017–18 Cypriot Third Division

- Onisilos Sotira
- MEAP Nisou
- Akritas Chlorakas

Teams relegated to 2018–19 Cypriot Third Division

- P.O. Xylotymbou
- Ethnikos Assia
- Chalkanoras Idaliou

== Stadia and locations ==
Location of clubs in 2018–19 Cypriot Second Division

Note: Table lists clubs in alphabetical order.

Club	Location	Venue	Capacity
AEZ	Zakaki, Limassol	Zakaki Community Stadium	2,000
Akritas	Chloraka, Paphos	Chloraka Municipal Stadium	3,500
Anagennisi	Deryneia, Famagusta	Anagennisi Football Ground	5,800
Aris	Limassol	Tsirio Stadium	13,331
ASIL	Larnaca	Grigoris Afxentiou Stadium	2,000
Ayia Napa	Ayia Napa, Famagusta	Ayia Napa Municipal Stadium	2,000
Digenis	Oroklini, Larnaca	Koinotiko Stadio Oroklinis	1,500
Ethnikos	Achna, Famagusta	Dasaki Stadium	7,000
Karmiotissa	Pano Polemidia, Limassol	Pano Polemidia Municipal Stadium	1,500
MEAP	Nisou, Nicosia	Theodorio Koinotiko	1,000
Olympiakos	Nicosia	Makario Stadium	16,000
Omonia Ar.	Aradippou, Larnaca	Aradippou Municipal Stadium	2,500
Onisilos	Sotira, Famagusta	Sotira Municipal Stadium	1,000
Othellos	Athienou, Larnaca	Othellos Athienou Stadium	5,000
PAEEK	Lakatamia, Nicosia	Keryneia-Epistrophi Stadium	2,000
THOI	Lakatamia, Nicosia	THOI Lakatamia Stadium	3,500

== League table ==
Pos	Team	Pld	W	D	L	GF	GA	GD	Pts	Qualification or relegation
1	Ethnikos Achna	27	18	8	1	58	20	+38	62	Promotion to Cypriot First Division
2	Olympiakos Nicosia	27	19	3	5	63	27	+36	60	Promotion to Cypriot First Division
3	Aris Limassol	27	18	5	4	55	30	+25	59	
4	Othellos Athienou	27	13	8	6	59	28	+31	47	
5	Anagennisi Deryneia	27	12	5	10	38	28	+10	41	
6	ASIL Lysi	27	11	6	10	32	33	−1	39	
7	Omonia Aradippou	27	12	2	13	39	36	+3	38	
8	Onisilos Sotira 2014	27	11	4	12	37	40	−3	37 (Note: Head to head record: Karmiotissa 2–1 Onisilos, Onisilos 3–1 Karmiotissa.)	
9	Karmiotissa	27	11	4	12	42	53	−11	37	
10	Ayia Napa	27	9	7	11	39	36	+3	34	
11	AEZ Zakakiou	27	9	6	12	36	47	−11	33	
12	Akritas Chlorakas	27	10	2	15	32	53	−21	32	
13	MEAP Nisou	27	7	6	14	38	48	−10	27	Relegation to the Cypriot Third Division
14	THOI Lakatamia	27	6	8	13	22	49	−27	26	Relegation to the Cypriot Third Division
15	PAEEK (R)	27	5	7	15	33	55	−22	22	Relegation to the Cypriot Third Division
16	Digenis Oroklinis (R)	27	3	5	19	25	65	−40	14	Relegation to the Cypriot Third Division

Updated to match(es) played on 24 April 2019. Source: CFA (in Greek)
Rules for classification: 1) Points; 2) Head-to-head points; 3) Head-to-head goal difference; 4) Head-to-head goals scored; 5) Head-to-head away goals scored (only if two teams); 6) Goal difference; 7) Goals scored; 8) Play-off (only if deciding championship round, relegation round or relegation).
(R) Relegated

== Results ==
Home \ Away	AEZ	AKR	ANA	ARI	ASL	AYN	DOR	ETH	KAR	MEAP	OLY	OMA	ONI	OTH	PAE	THO
AEZ Zakakiou	—	3–0	1–0	2–3	2–1	1–1		2–1	2–0		0–4	2–1	3–3	2–1	2–2	1–2
Akritas Chlorakas	3–0	—	2–0	2–4	0–0	0–5	2–1	1–3	1–0	1–0	1–4	1–0	1–2		3–0	1–2
Anagennisi	1–0	5–1	—	0–1	1–0	1–0	2–2	0–2	2–1	3–0	1–2	2–1		2–2		3–0
Aris Limassol	1–0		2–1	—	3–2		2–0	2–2	5–2	4–2	2–3	2–1	5–2	2–2	2–1	2–0
ASIL Lysi	0–1		1–1	1–0	—	1–1	2–1	0–2		3–3	2–2	1–0	1–1	1–0	0–2	4–1
Ayia Napa	2–1	3–0		1–0	1–2	—	5–1	1–3	1–3	1–1	1–2	0–4	1–1	1–1	3–2	2–1
Digenis Oroklinis	1–3	2–0	0–2	1–4	0–1	1–1	—	1–3		3–1		0–2	1–2	0–4	2–1	0–3
Ethnikos Achna		4–1	1–0	0–0	3–1	2–1	1–1	—	2–2	5–1	2–1	3–1		1–1	6–1	5–0
Karmiotissa	3–1	2–1	1–4	1–1	1–2	2–1	2–1	1–2	—	5–3		1–0	2–1	3–1	2–2	2–0
MEAP Nisou	1–1	2–3	0–2	1–0	0–0	0–0	4–0		1–0	—	1–2	0–0	1–0	1–3	3–1	10–1
Olympiakos Nicosia	4–0	0–1	4–1	0–2	0–2	3–1	4–1	1–1	1–1	2–0	—	4–1	2–0	2–1	5–0	
Omonia Aradippou	1–0	2–1	1–0	0–1	3–0		3–2	0–1	5–2		1–3	—	4–2	0–2	2–4	1–0
Onisillos Sotira	2–1	1–2	0–2	0–1	2–0	1–0	3–1	0–1	3–1	1–0	1–2		—	2–1	2–1	0–0
Othellos Athienou	5–1	5–2	2–1	2–2	2–1	1–0	6–0	0–0	5–0	7–1	1–2	0–0	2–0	—		
PAEEK	3–3	0–0	1–1		1–3	0–3	2–2	0–2	3–1	0–2	2–0	2–3	2–1	0–1	—	0–1
THOI Lakatamia	1–1	3–1	0–0	1–2		1–2	0–0	0–0	2–1	0–0	0–4	0–2	2–4	1–1	0–0	—

Updated to match(es) played on 24 April 2019. Source: Cyprus Football Association (in Greek)
Legend: Blue = home team win; Yellow = draw; Red = away team win.
For upcoming matches, an "a" indicates there is an article about the rivalry between the two participants.
