= AEK Korakou =

Cypriot football club

- Founded: 1999; 26 years ago
- League: STOK Elite Division
- 2021–22: STOK Elite Division, 6th

AEK Korakou is a Cypriot association football club based in Korakou, located in the Nicosia District. It has 1 participation in Cypriot Fourth Division.
