= Roads and motorways in Cyprus =

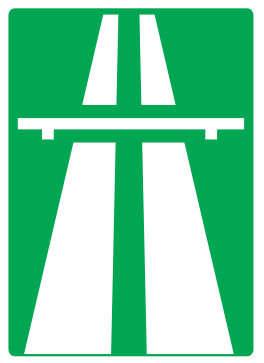
Cyprus Motorway logo

According to 2002 statistics, the road network in areas administered by the Republic of Cyprus consists of about 7,206 km of paved and 4,387 km of unpaved roads. Although the first motorway in Cyprus (the A1) was completed as recently as October 1985, by 2009 the country already had the most motorway km per capita (36.8 km /100,000 inhabitants) among all European Union members.

There are no toll paying roads in Cyprus to date.

== Maintenance ==
The Department of Public Works of the Ministry of Transportation, Communications and Works is generally responsible for the maintenance, improvement and construction of the road network; while the municipalities are responsible for those secondary and intercity roads in their jurisdiction in more granular ways; with the District Administration Authorities taking the responsibilities of what would be municipal governments in areas which are not in municipalities (rural areas). The Forestry Department is separately responsible for most unpaved roads in forest areas, in order to accommodate the administration and protection of forests.

== History ==
In the 1970s, the Cypriot Government introduced a series of schemes to improve the infrastructure of transport in the country. The first planned motorway was to be built between Nicosia and Nicosia International Airport, roughly on the route of the current Griva Digeni Avenue and B10. The road was widened in preparation, but following the Turkish Invasion of Cyprus in July 1974 and the closure of the airport as a result, this scheme was abandoned. Also due to the Turkish Invasion, Limassol emerged as the main port of Cyprus, so the decision was made to build a motorway between Nicosia and Limassol instead.

In July 2025, the European Investment Bank (EIB) was reported to provide funds of €100 million to allow for improvements to the general road network

== Speed limits ==
Standard speed limits in Cyprus

For passenger cars and vans below 3.5 long tons (3.9 short tons), the speed limits in Cyprus are generally as follows:

Type of road	Limit in km/h (mph)
Pedestrian zones	30 (19)
Urban	50 (31)
Rural	80 (50)
Motorway	100 (62)

== Motorways of Cyprus ==
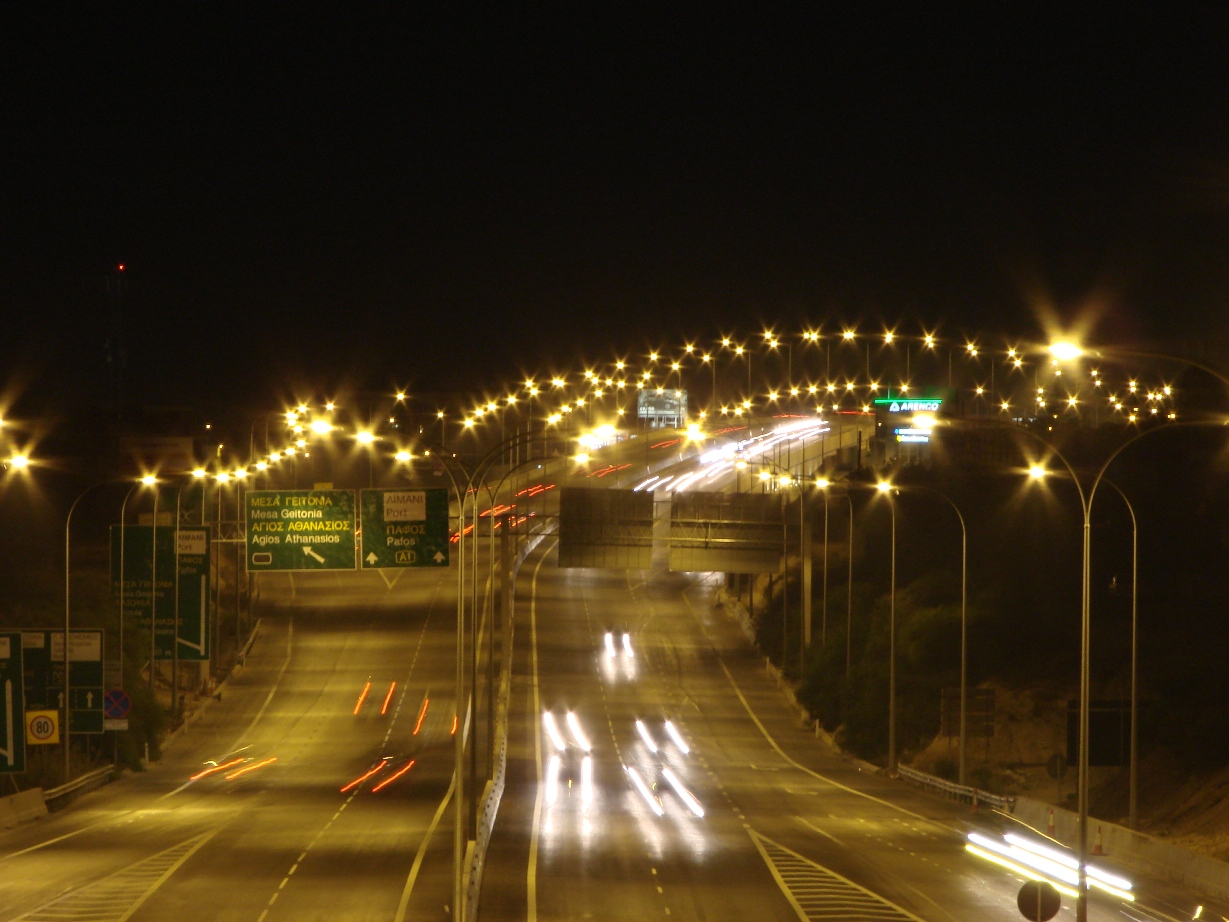
A1 Motorway

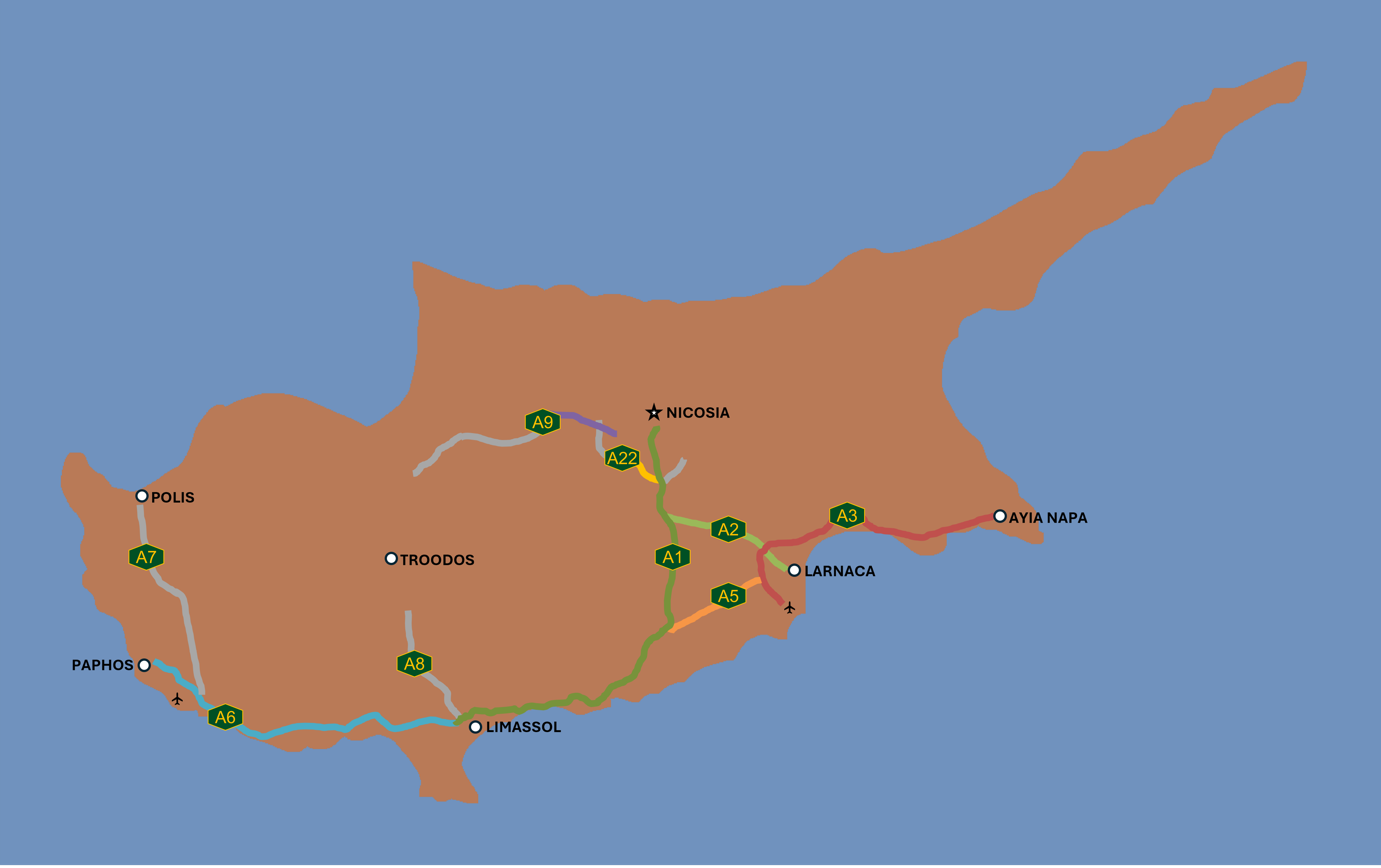
Map of motorways in Cyprus

Name	Connecting Cities	Status	Year completed	Special Features
A1 highway logo	Nicosia - Limassol	Completed	1985	1st Motorway in Cyprus, 5,200 m Emergency runway
A2 highway logo	Nicosia - Larnaca	Completed	1991	1st Modern Motorway in Cyprus, 1st Motorway Interchange in Cyprus
A3 highway logo	Larnaca Airport - Ayia Napa	Completed	2002	First Beltway in Cyprus
A5 highway logo	Larnaca - Limassol	Completed	1996	5,000 m emergency runway
A6 highway logo	Limassol - Paphos	Completed	2006	950 m tunnel, 110m tall bridge, one of the 300 largest in the world.
A7 highway logo	Paphos - Polis	Under construction	Expected by 2031	3 tunnels
A8 highway logo	Limassol - Saittas	Completed from Polemidia - Palodia	Expected at an unknown date	1st split-level dual carriageway in Cyprus
A9 highway logo	Nicosia - Evrychou	Completed from Nicosia - Deneia and from Astromeritis - Evrychou	Expected after 2030	Links Nicosia to Troodos Mountains
A10 highway logo	Nicosia-Palaichori	Under Construction Anthoupolis - Ergates , Ergates - Palaichori under design	Expected at an unknown date	4 lane section of E903 near Anthopoulis Roundabout will become part of the motorway
A22 highway logo	Nicosia Ring Road	Completed from A1 to B901 road	Expected at an unknown date	3.2 km of cut and cover tunneling in Lakatamia

== B Roads of Cyprus ==
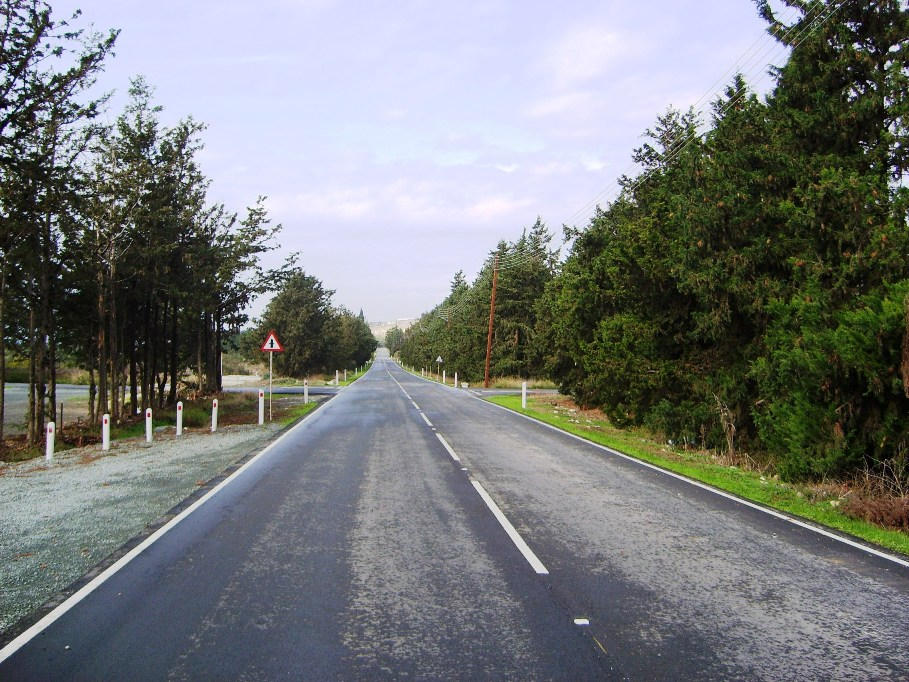
B6 near Kouklia

Logo	Route	Urban Name
B2 road logo	Limassol - Nicosia	Giannou Kardioti
B2 road logo	Pera Chorio - Larnaca	Georgiou Griva Digeni
B3 road logo	Larnaca - Agia Napa	Ammoxostou
B4 road logo	Dromolaxia - Larnaca	Artemidos Avenue
B5 road logo	Kofinou - Larnaca	Lemesou
B6 road logo	Limassol - Paphos	Archebiskopu Makarios III
B7 road logo	Paphos - Polis Chrysophous	Hellados Avenue
B8 road logo	Limassol - Troodos	Despinas and Nikou Patichi
B9 road logo	Nicosia - Troodos	Archangel Michael
B10 road logo	Grigoris Afxentiou to Kokkinotrimithia	n/a
B13 road logo	Nicosia to Kaimakli	Agiou Andreou Avenue
B16 road logo	Palouriotissa - Sopaz	John Kennedy
B17 road logo	Nicosia - Aglantzia	Larnakas
B18 road logo	Nicosia - Agios Dometitos	Grigoris Afxentiou
B20 road logo	Kenedy Square - Kato Paphos	Apostolou Pavlou
B22 road logo	Nicosia Orbital	Spyrou Kiprianou

== Road network categories and numbering ==
Roads and Motorways in Cyprus can be classified into 6 main categories:

A roads logo layout, A1 logo

- Motorways: 4 lanes, free of any at-grade intersections. They are the most important road network on the island, and the letter "A" is used for their official numbering. They usually either run parallel to the B class roads of the same name (Like the A1) or are upgraded B roads (Like part of the A3). While there is no formal announcement about the numbering of new motorways under construction and under planning, it's anticipated that they will have the same number as the B road they will replace. So the Paphos - Polis Motorway will be coded A7 because A is the letter of Motorways and 7 because it will "replace" the B7 in terms of functionality.

B roads logo layout, B6 logo

- Intercity Routes: usually 2 lanes, except sometimes to help with congestion, can have roundabouts and traffic lights. They are labelled as B routes, and all have 1 number. Most of them have been replaced for intercity transport with their same-number Motorway counterparts, but are often still important for urban transport

- Main Avenues: important roads that are mostly within city limits that are labeled B routes due to either being seen as important or having had 4 lanes during classification

E and F roads logo layout, E603 (B6 - Paphos International Airport) logo

- Secondary "E" Roads: when classified they had 2 lanes and were always paved. Their numbers contain 3 digits. The first digit is the serial number of the motorway or intercity road (main road) it branches off of either directly or as a sub-branch and the last two digits are a serial number of the road itself, with it getting larger the further away it is from the start of the main road

- Secondary "F" Roads: when coded during the 80's 1 laned and often unpaved, today almost completely paved and often having lanes in both directions. They use "F" in the official coding system, and they are counted in the same way as "E"s are. There is no "E" with the same number as an "F".

- Unclassified roads. Roads were constructed after the road network was numbered, so they will remain without a serial number until the next road numbering evaluation.

== Road safety ==
Cyprus currently holds a worse than average road safety record in the European Union

Official Figures^{a}	1991	1992	1993	1994	1995	1996	1997	1998	1999	2000	2001	2002	2003	2004	2005	2006	2007	2008	2009	2010	2011	2012	2013	2014	2015	2016	2017	2018	2019	2020	2021	2022	2023
Accidents	3,172				3,052		3,021							2,080				2,131	1,856	1,883	1,690	1,492	1,273	1,154	958	942	876	741	727	506	422	555	-
Injuries^{b}	4,232						4,490	3,916	3,712	3,586	3,531	3,176	3,523	3,411				1,963	1,723	1,762	1,553	1,381	1,129	1,070	947	964	838	741	673	429	491	505	-
Fatalities	103	132	115	133	118	128	115	111	113	111	98	94	97	117	98	84	89	82	71	60	71	51	44	45	57	46	53	49	52	48	44	38	-
Fatalities/Million	150	189	161	184	162	174	155	149	150	147	129	124	128	154																			

^a Pre-2008 data: European Commission Road Safety Country Profile report for Cyprus. Post-2008 data: Cyprus' National Open Data Portal

^b Data entered from 2008 onwards does not include deaths or fatalities.
