= Marathounta =

Marathounta Μαραθούντα
- Location in Cyprus
- Coordinates: 34°47′30″N 32°29′14″E
- Country: Cyprus
- District: Paphos District
- Elevation: 323 m (1,060 ft)

Population (2001)
  - Total: 256
- Time zone: UTC+2 (EET)
  - Summer (DST): UTC+3 (EEST)
- Postal code: 6110

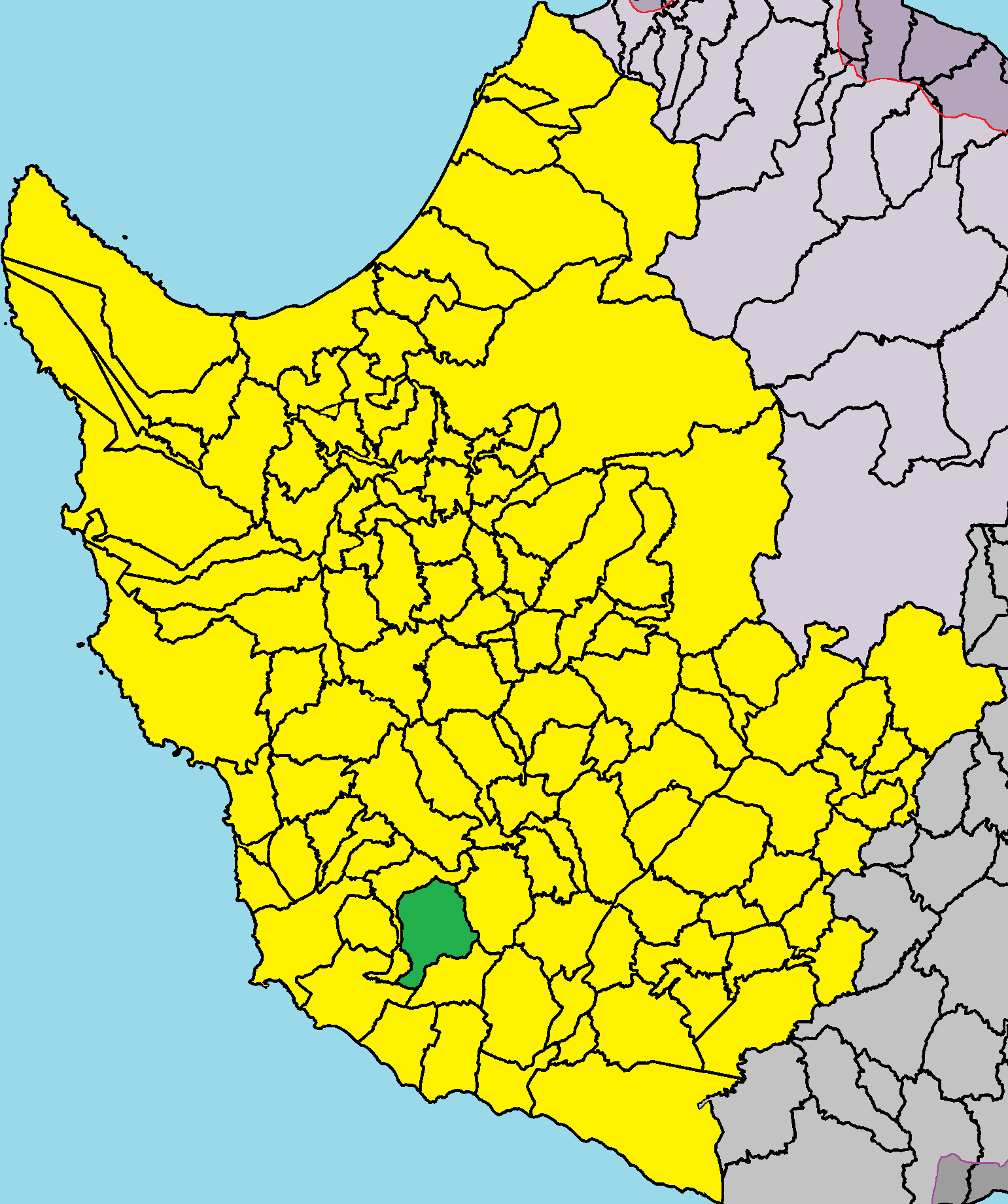

Marathounta (Greek: Μαραθούντα) is a village in the Paphos District of Cyprus, located 6 km east of Paphos. Marathounta is located at 323 m above sea level. Marathounta is a small traditional village that brings peace and quiet to its visitors. Although not far from the hectic Paphos with its infrastructure, it manages to maintain a more rural character, at the same time enjoying the privileges of its proximity to the urban center. For those who want to visit the area, there is a tavern serving local appetizers. Similar options can be found in neighboring Armou, but for further amenities or services, visitors can go to the city or the more developed Konia, just 5 minutes away by car.
