= Anthoupolis =

Anthoupolis: Ανθούπολη (Greek); Antupolis (Turkish)
- Village
- Interactive map of Anthoupolis
- Location within Cyprus Location within the Eastern Mediterranean Location within the European Union Location within Asia
- Coordinates: 35°06′15″N 33°17′23″E
- Country: Cyprus
- District: Nicosia District
- Urban area: Nicosia

Area
  - Village: 0.44 km^{2} (0.17 sq mi)

Population (2011)
  - Village: 1,756
- Time zone: UTC+2 (EET)
  - Summer (DST): UTC+3 (EEST)

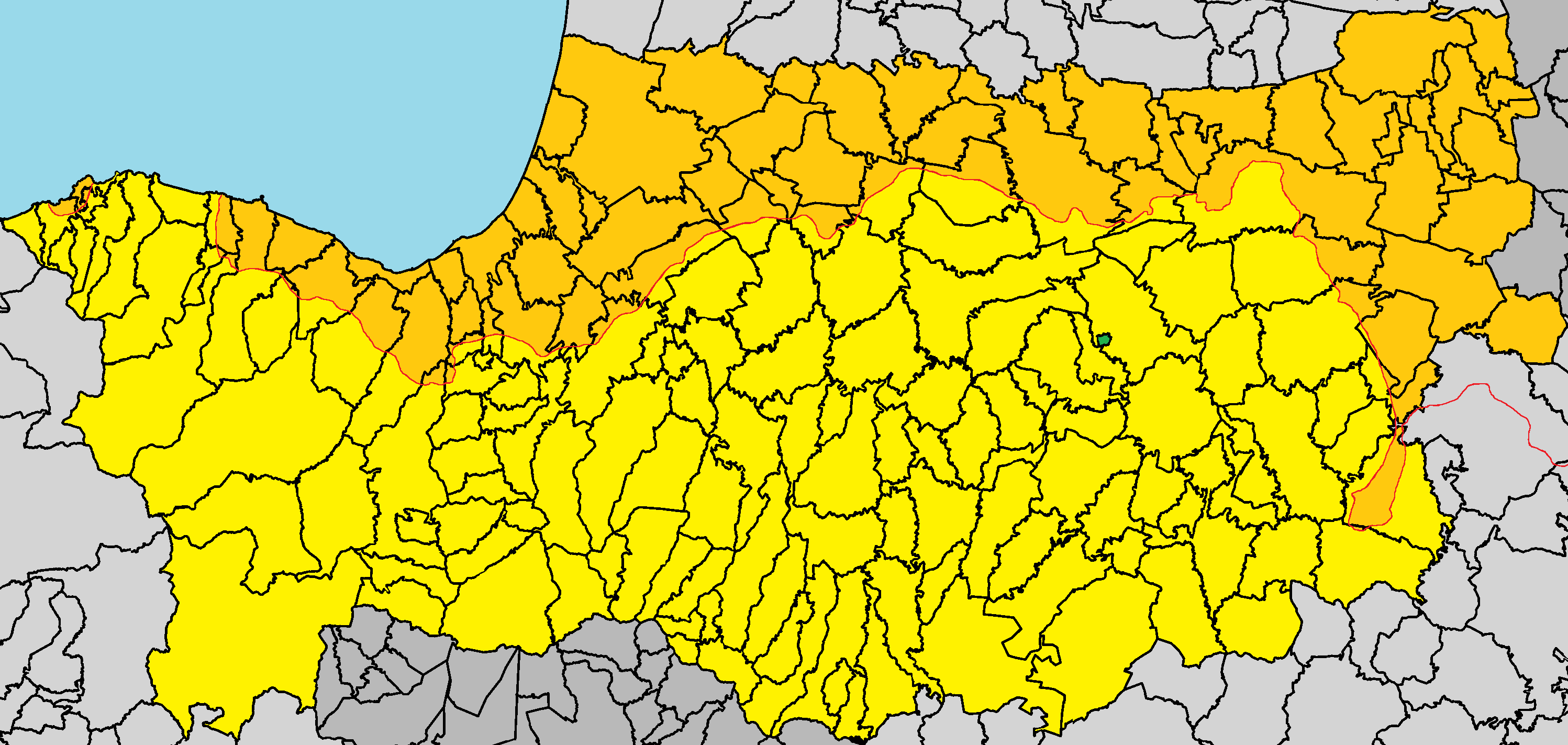
Locator map highlighting Anthoupolis within the Nicosia District of Cyprus

Anthoupolis (Greek: Ανθούπολη; Turkish: Antupolis) is a village, south of Nicosia, Cyprus. Anthoupolis is a rather new area which was created after the Turkish Invasion of 1974 to house refugees. The original refugee site is slowly abandoned and new houses and projects are being held to regenerate the wider area. The Greek name means Flower-City or in a more metaphorical sense flowering, expanding city.

Anthoupolis is located next to the A9 highway exit towards Troodos mountain.
