= Evrychou =

Evrychou: Ευρύχου (Greek); Evrihu (Turkish)
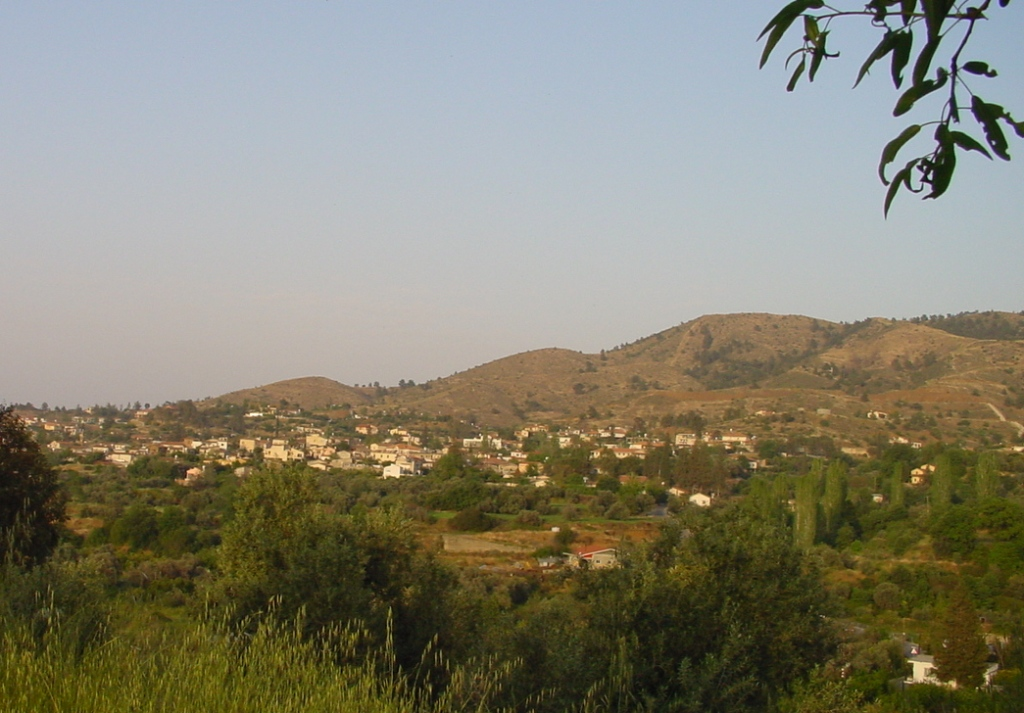
- Evrychou

- Location in Cyprus
- Coordinates: 35°02′N 32°54′E
- Country: Cyprus
- District: Nicosia District

Population (2011)
  - Total: 827
- Time zone: UTC+2 (EET)
  - Summer (DST): UTC+3 (EEST)

Evrychou (Greek: Ευρύχου; Turkish: Evrihu) is a village in Cyprus. It is located in the Nicosia District and the agricultural centre of the "Solea" region located about 50 km south-west of Nicosia and 30 km from Troodos Mountains.

== Geography and climate ==
Evrychou is located in Nicosia District and it is the agricultural centre of the "Solea" region. It is located about 50 km south-west of Nicosia and 30 km from mount Troodos. The village is built at the east bank of the Karkotis (or Klarios) River, at an average altitude of 440 metres. The climate of the region is typically Mediterranean and so the cultivations found around the village vary from fruit-bearing trees (mainly apple, pear, plum, apricot, and peach trees) to citrus-trees, almond and olive trees. There are also cultivations of vines, vegetables and cereals.

== Etymology ==
There are several interpretations regarding the village's name. The most prevalent reports that the village got its name because of being the only village in the region that has the largest range: “Evrys Chous”, which in ancient Greek means “Large area / land”. A second interpretation mentions that, according to tradition, the name was given to the village by immigrants from other regions, which found here plenty and fertile land (“Ev Chous”, meaning Good land). Another interpretation says that it took its name from the community's first settler who was named Evrychios.

== Population ==
Year	Population
1982	977
2001	819
2011	827

== Transportation and nearest places ==
Evrychou is connected by road to Kato Flasou (about 3 km) in the north-east, to Temvria (about 2 km) in the south-west, and to Korakou (about 2 km) in the west. The Nicosia -- Troodos road connects the village both with the capital as well as with the mountainous resorts of Troodos.

== Cyprus Railway Museum ==
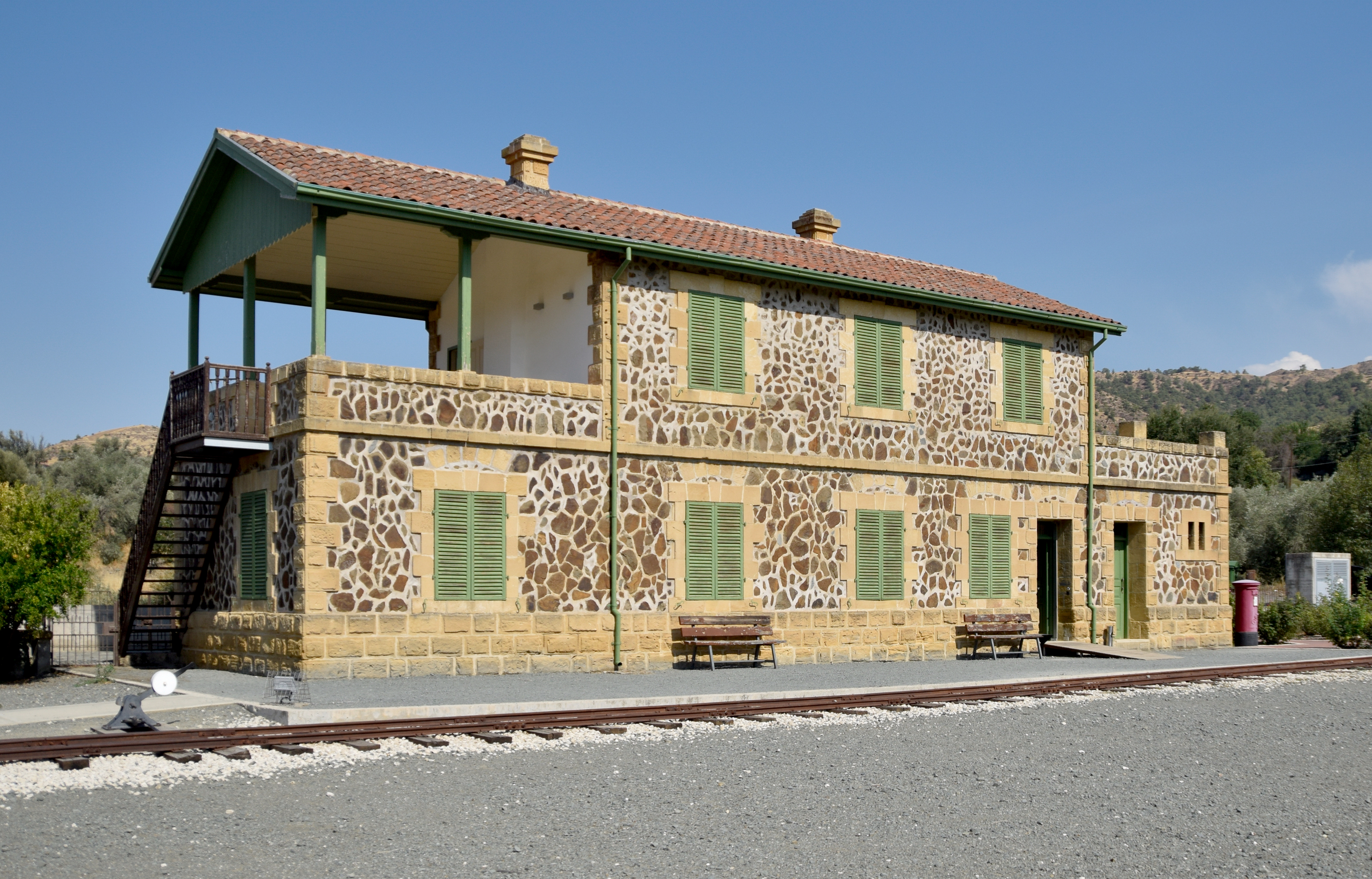
The Cyprus Railways Museum in 2021

One of the most important events that marked the British stay during their presence in Cyprus – 1878 – 1960 – is the operation of the railway, in 1905 –1951.

On 21 October 1905, the openings of the first line up to Nicosia took place, in Famagusta, and in 1907 until Morfou, in order to reach the final station in Skouriotissa and the Evryhou, in 1915. There that the ruins of a stone -built building is saved, it was the last station of the Cypriot railway. It was built in 1906.

Evrychou was the western terminus of the Cyprus Government Railway from 14 June 1915. It operated until 31 December 1931, when the last five miles of the railway were abandoned.

The building of Evrychou station was later used as a sanitary centre, and then as a forest worker dormitory. In the recent years the station and its surroundings were rebuilt to become the Cyprus Railway Museum. The old station building was renovated and a total of about 100 meters of new tracks were laid in 2010-2012, and a new shelter was built for a restored wagon and a hand-powered trolley along informative posters about their past. The museum finally opened in November, 2014.

== Other ==
Evrychou has a regional elementary school, a high school (Gymnasio & Lykeio Soleas), a senior high school, a fire station, a health centre, a police station, an office of the Game & Fauna Department, and a branch of the Nicosia District Agricultural Office. Furthermore, the metropolitan bishop of Morfou has transferred his temporary headquarters in the village after the 1974 Turkish Invasion. The Morfou Diocese was transferred to Evrychou and is housed in the premises of the Old Elementary School after it was renovated and some new apartments were added. Since old times, a regional office of the Department of Land & Surveys and a Court operated and still operate until today.
