= Konia, Cyprus =

Konia Κονιά
- Location in Cyprus
- Coordinates: 34°47′2″N 32°27′30″E
- Country: Cyprus
- District: Paphos District
- Elevation: 189 m (620 ft)

Population (2001)
  - Total: 1,100
- Time zone: UTC+2 (EET)
  - Summer (DST): UTC+3 (EEST)
- Postal code: 6011

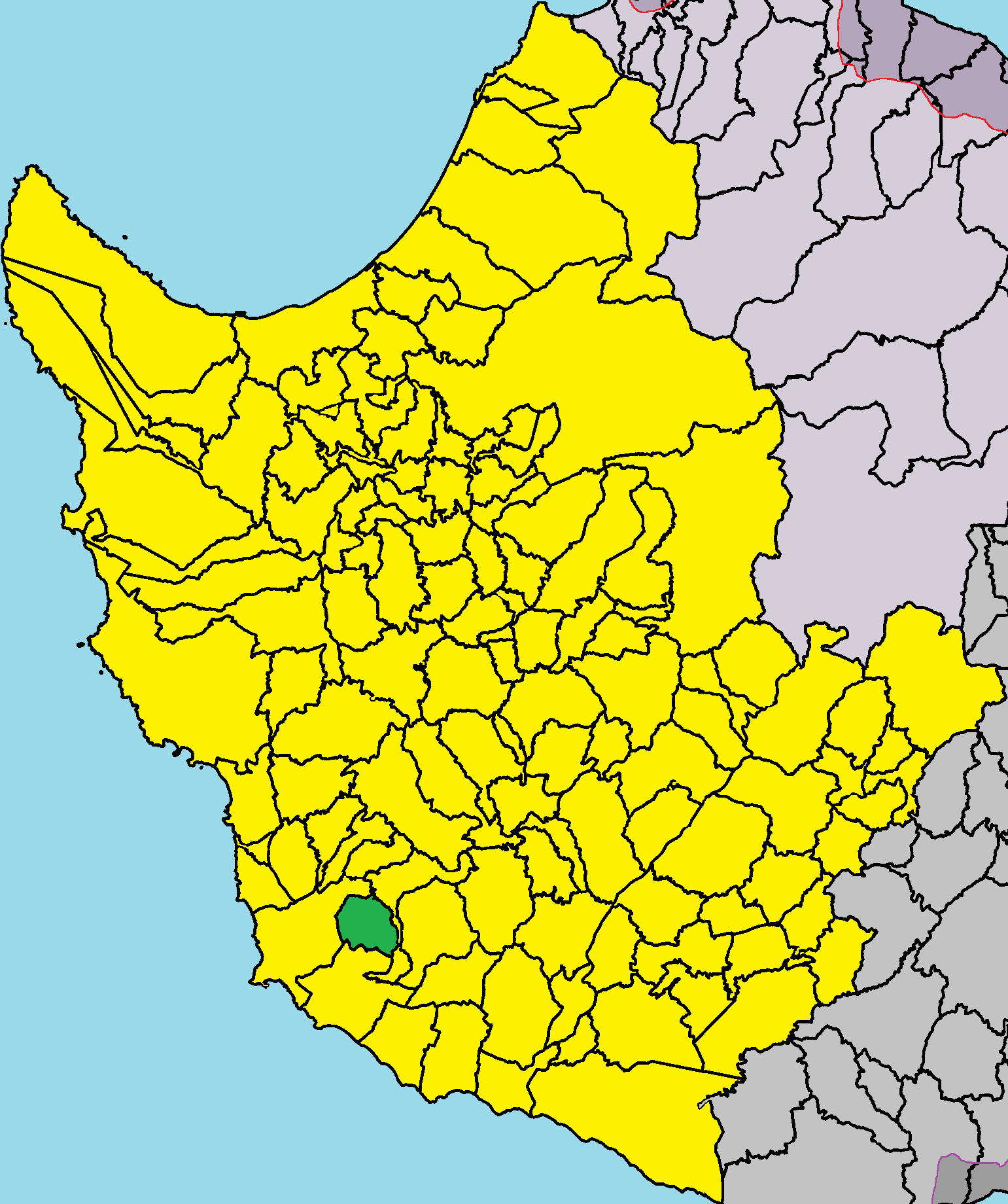
Konia, Cyprus in Paphos District

Konia (Greek: Κονιά) is a suburb in the Paphos District of Cyprus, located 3 km east of Paphos. In the northwest is Anavargos village, Armou in the northeast, Marathounta East and Yeroskipou in the South.

== Topography ==
Built at an altitude of 200 meters the village of Konia with about 2,000 inhabitants, is constantly developing.
