= Anagyia =

Anagyia: Ανάγυια (Greek); Anaya (Turkish); Anageia
- Village
- Location in Cyprus
- Coordinates: 35°4′22″N 33°15′7″E
- Country: Cyprus
- District: Nicosia District

Population (2011)
  - Total: 1,514
- Time zone: UTC+2 (EET)
  - Summer (DST): UTC+3 (EEST)
- Postcode: 2640

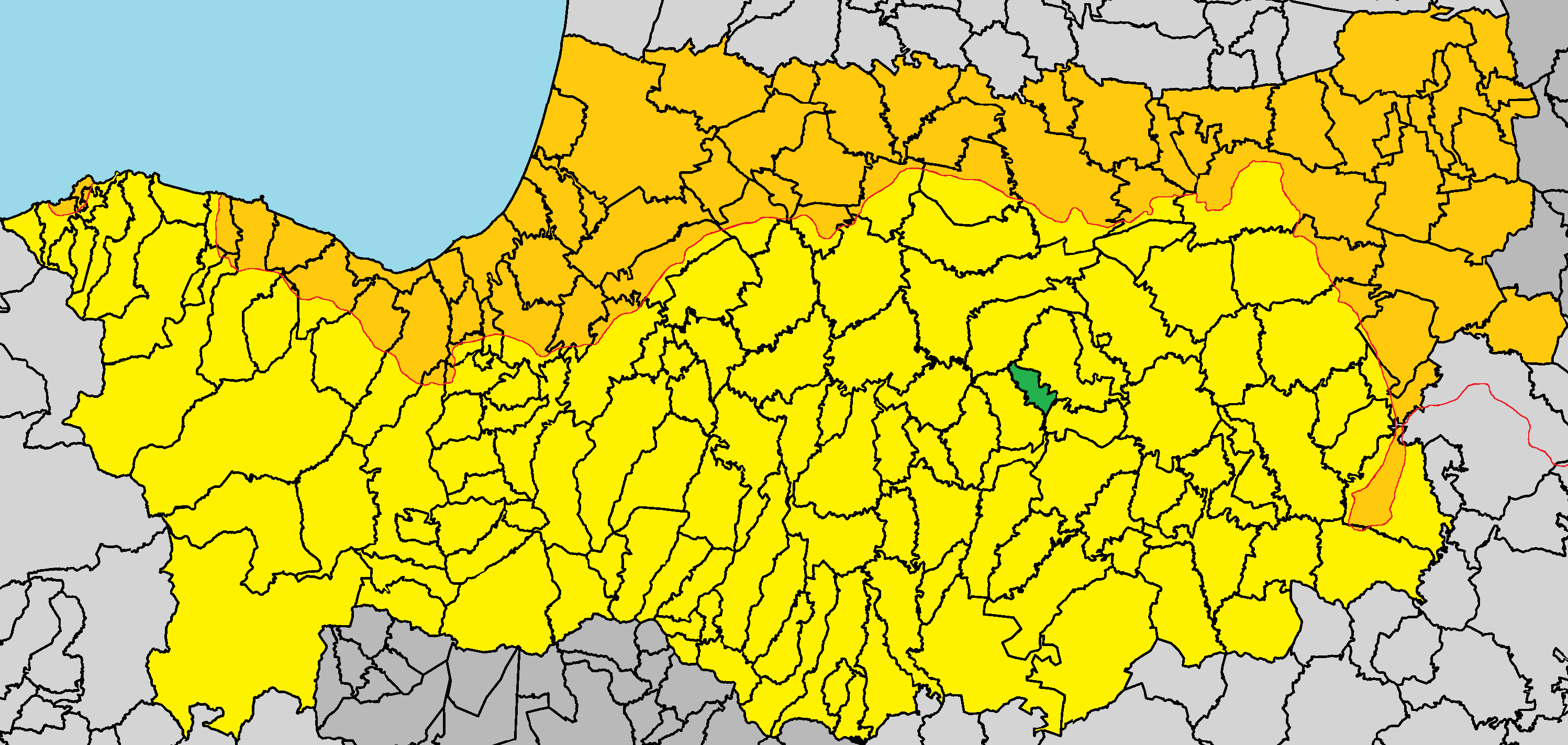
A map of Anagyia.

Anagyia (Greek: Ανάγυια; Turkish: Anaya), also known as Anageia (Greek: Ανάγεια), is a village in the Nicosia District of Cyprus, which lies approximately 15 km south of the capital Nicosia, just south of the village of Pano Deftera and north of the village of Ergates. The river Pedieos flows along the east side of the village, forming the municipal border between it and the neighbouring communities of Pano Deftera and Psimolofou.

The name of the village comes from the Ancient Greek words "ἀνά" (ana) and "ἀγυιά" (agyia), meaning "upper" and "road". The name is associated with a historic small road that leads to the village and deviates from the road that connects Nicosia with the mountainous area of Pitsilia.

The village is home to two Greek-Orthodox churches, an older one to the east where the village cemetery is also located, and a larger modern church in the west which was built to increase capacity, both dedicated to the two patron saints of the community, Nomonas and Vichianos. The old church was dedicated to Saint Nomon as there was a cave nearby in which it is said that the saint rested as he travelled around the region.

Anagyia has been presented several times by the state with the yearly cleanliness award.

Some notable locations include the old stone church of Saints Nomonos and Vihianos, the old neighbourhoods, which feature narrow streets between traditionally built mud and straw houses, and the community park located at the top of a hill with a panoramic view of the village and surrounding areas.
