= Kokkinotrimithia =

Kokkinotrimithia: Κοκκινοτριμιθιά (Greek); Koççinotrimitya (Turkish)
- Location in Cyprus
- Coordinates: 35°9′10″N 33°11′59.64″E
- Country: Cyprus
- District: Nicosia District

Government
  - Type: Community council

Population (2011)
  - Total: 4,077
- Time zone: UTC+2 (EET)
  - Summer (DST): UTC+3 (EEST)
- Postal code: 2660

Kokkinotrimithia (Greek: Κοκκινοτριμιθιά [locally [kot͡ʃʰinotrimiˈθca]]; Turkish: Koççinotrimitya) is a village located west of Nicosia, Cyprus, close to the Green Line. It has an exit along the A9 motorway. In 2011, it had 4,077 inhabitants.
