= Geri, Cyprus =

Town in Cyprus, southeast of Nicosia

Geri: Γέρι (Greek); Geri (Turkish)
- Municipality
- Location within Cyprus Location within the Eastern Mediterranean Location within the European Union Location within Asia
- Coordinates: 35°06′25″N 33°25′17″E
- Country: Cyprus
- District: Nicosia District
- Urban area: Nicosia

Area
  - Geri: 28.26 km^{2} (10.91 sq mi)
  - Latsia-Geri: 44.81 km^{2} (17.30 sq mi)

Population (2011)
  - Geri: 8,235
  - Density: 291.4/km^{2} (754.7/sq mi)
  - Latsia-Geri: 25,009
  - Latsia-Geri density: 558.1/km^{2} (1,446/sq mi)
- Time zone: UTC+2 (EET)
  - Summer (DST): UTC+3 (EEST)
- Postal code: 2202
- Website: latsia-geri.eu

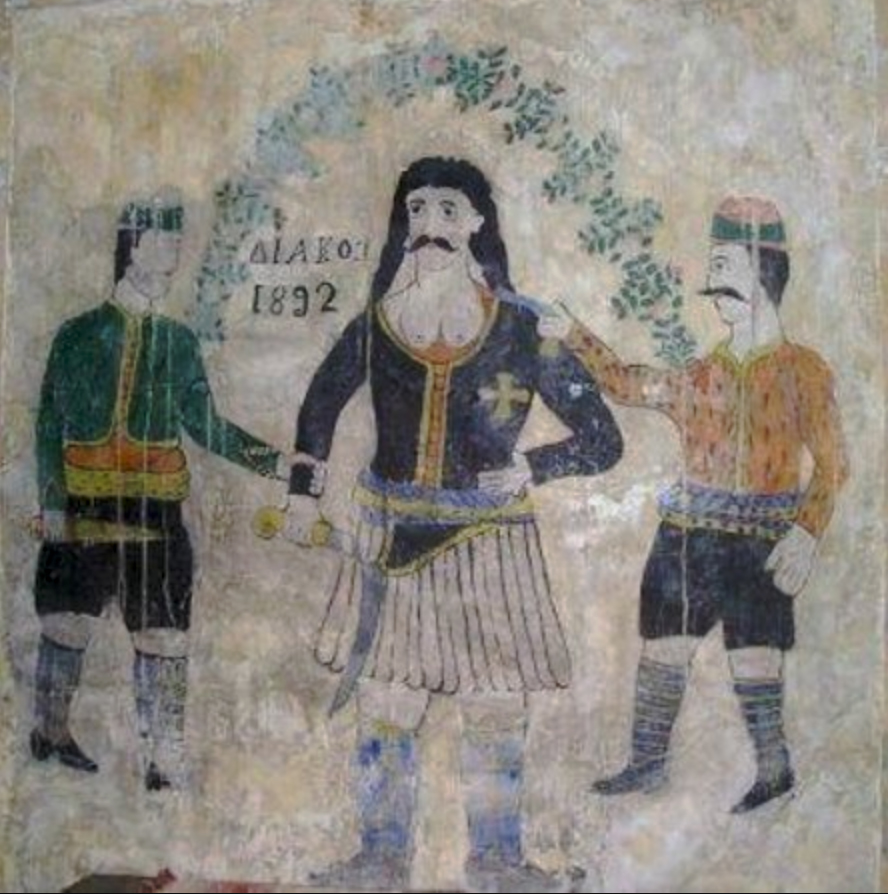
Painting of Athanasios Diakos, with the date 1892, from village of Geri, Cyprus, now in the Cyprus Folk Art Museum, Nicosia.

Geri, sometimes also transliterated as Yeri, (Greek: Γέρι; Turkish: Geri) is a settlement in Cyprus, 10 kilometres (6.2 mi) south-east of the capital Nicosia. In 2001, it had a population of 6,643. As of 2011, its population was 8,235. Following a referendum in 2011, Geri became a municipality. Since 2024, after local government reforms, Geri has been included in the newly created Latsia-Geri Municipality.
