= Korakou (Cyprus) =

Korakou: Kοράκου (Greek); Kuragu (Turkish)
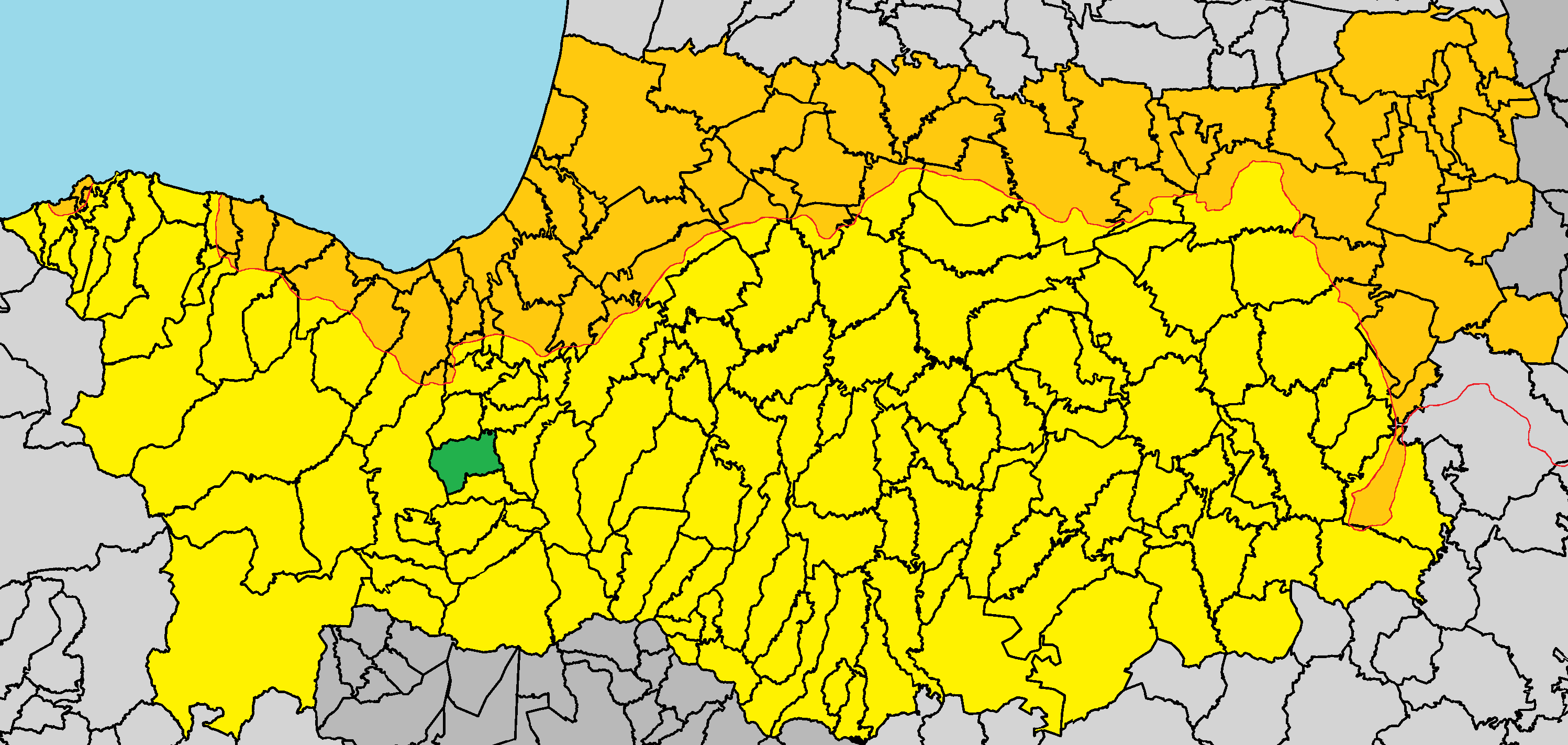

- Location in Cyprus
- Coordinates: 35°2′26″N 32°53′11″E
- Country: Cyprus
- District: Nicosia District

Population (2001)
  - Total: 500
- Time zone: UTC+2 (EET)
  - Summer (DST): UTC+3 (EEST)

Korakou (Greek: Kοράκου; Turkish: Kuragu) is a village in the Nicosia District of Cyprus. The hamlet of Agroladou is part of the municipality.
