= Kormakitis FC =

Cypriot football club

- Founded: 1989; 36 years ago
- Ground: Stadio Lakatamias, Lakatamia
- Capacity: 3500
- League: Regional League
- 2021–22: STOK Elite Division, 10th (relegated)

Kormakitis FC is a Cypriot association football club based in Kormakitis, located in the Keryneia District. It has 2 participations in Cypriot Fourth Division. The club was founded in 1989 and is the theoretical continuitation of Kedros Kormakiti and Livanos Kormakiti.
