= Latsia =

Latsia: Λατσιά (Greek); Laçça (Turkish)
- Municipality
- Seal
- Interactive map of Latsia
- Location within Cyprus Location within the Eastern Mediterranean Location within the European Union Location within Asia
- Coordinates: 35°06′N 33°22′E
- Country: Cyprus
- District: Nicosia District
- Urban area: Nicosia

Area
  - Latsia: 16.55 km^{2} (6.39 sq mi)
  - Latsia-Geri: 44.81 km^{2} (17.30 sq mi)

Population (2011)
  - Latsia: 16,774
  - Density: 1,014/km^{2} (2,625/sq mi)
  - Latsia-Geri: 25,009
  - Latsia-Geri density: 558.1/km^{2} (1,446/sq mi)
- Time zone: UTC+2 (EET)
  - Summer (DST): UTC+3 (EEST)
- Website: https://latsia-geri.eu/

Latsia (Greek: Λατσιά [locally [laˈt͡ʃʰa]]; Turkish: Laçça) is a municipality on the south east outskirts of Nicosia, Cyprus, is today one of the city's largest suburbs. It hosts the new Nicosia General Hospital, the new GSP Stadium and the Mall of Cyprus. Latsia has seen a great increase of population right after the Turkish invasion of the island and it became the home of many refugees since refuge housing was developed there. The population in 2011 has reached 16,774 people. Since 2024, after Local government reform, Latsia has been included in the newly created Latsia-Geri Municipality.

There is a statue of the town's local hero, the country's born and raised favorite artist George Michael. Several times, George Michael visited the statue as the statue is of great proportions.

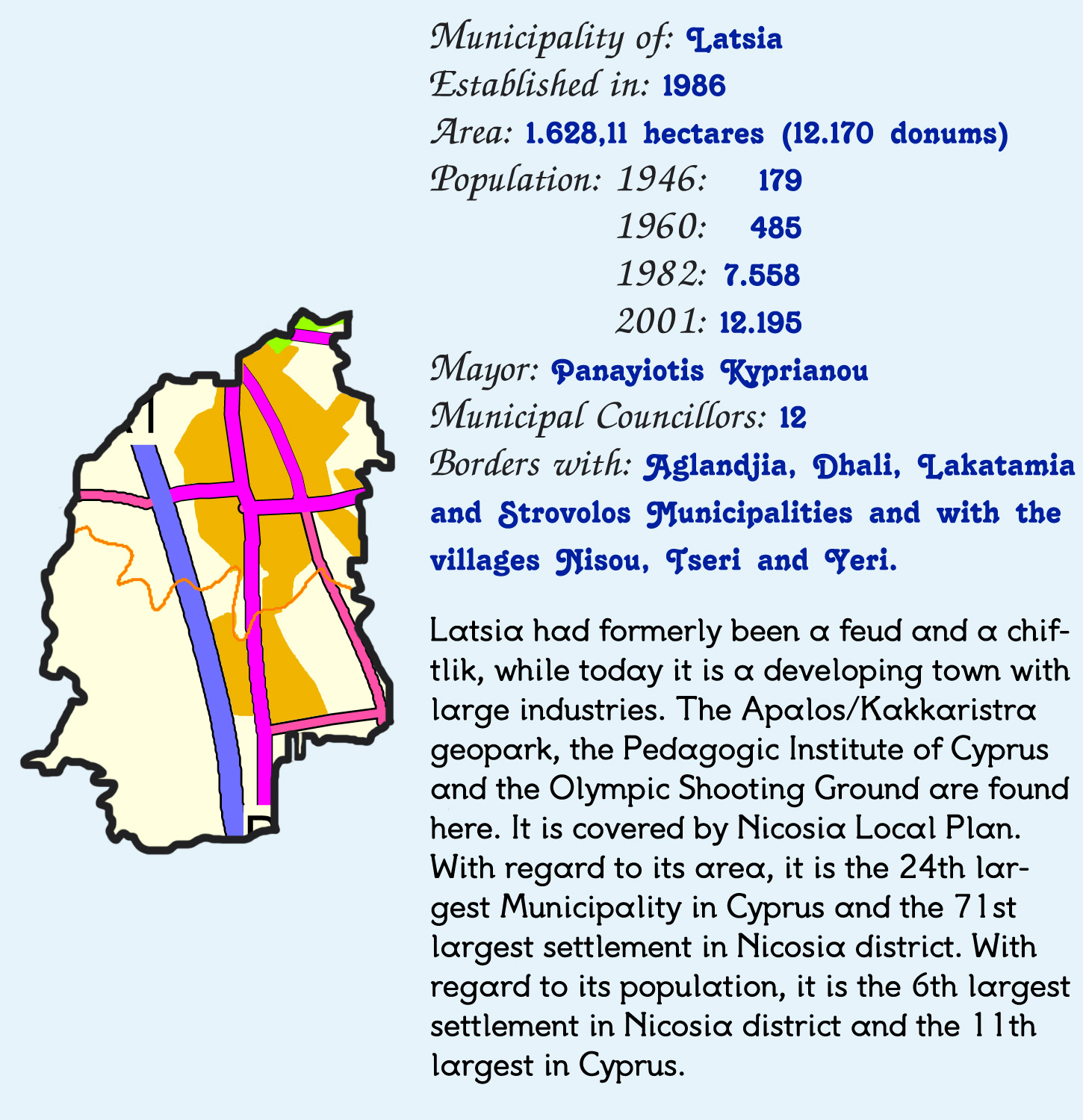
