= Transport in Cyprus =

Transportation networks and infrastructure in Cyprus

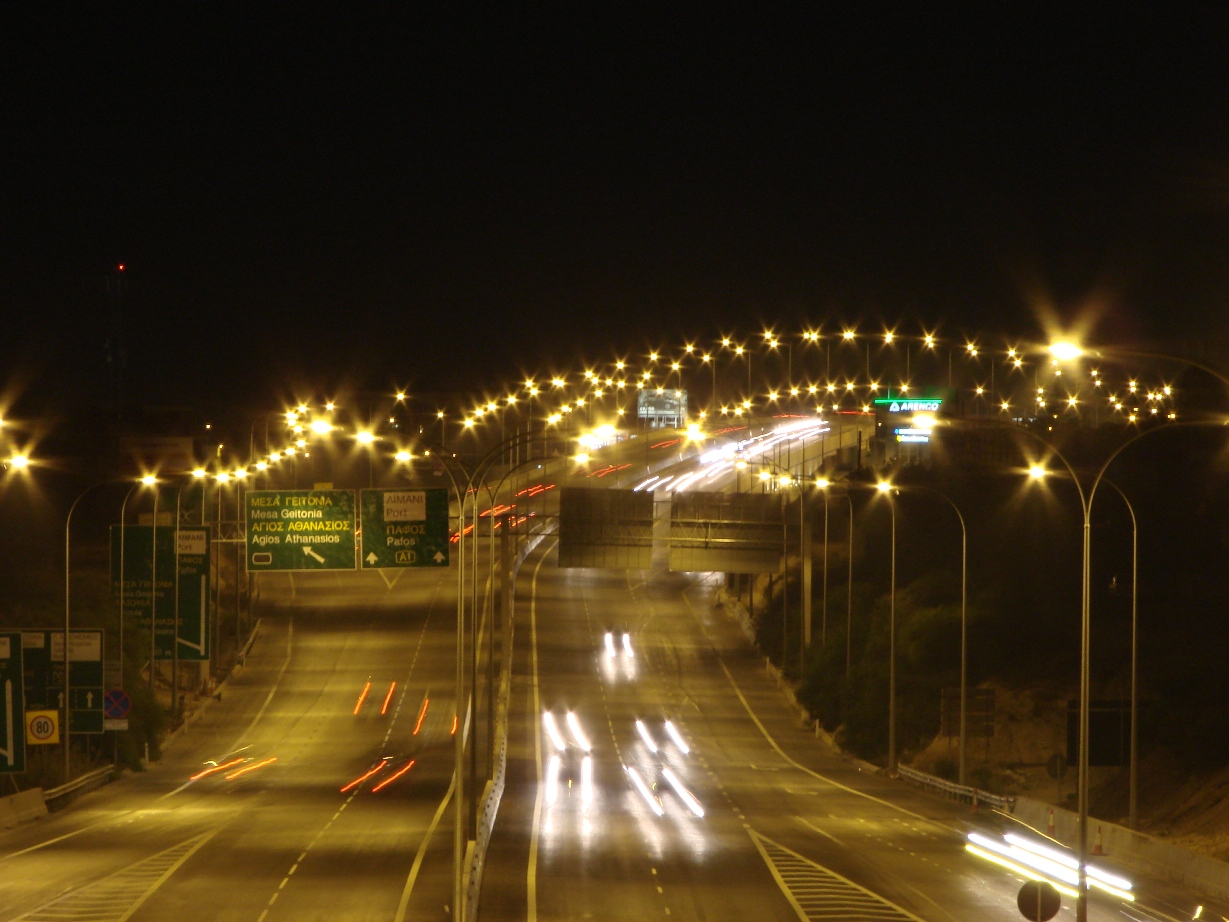
Night view between Agios Athanasios junction and Mesa Geitonia junction in Limassol

Transport in Cyprus consists of land, water and air transport. Road transport is the primary mode for most Cypriot citizens, and Cyprus's road transport systems are well-developed and extensively used across the island.

Because Cyprus no longer has a working railway system, various other methods of transport are needed to ensure the proper delivery of any cargo, be it human or freight. As the last passenger railway was dismantled in 1952, the only remaining modes of transport are by road, sea, and air.

== Roads ==
From the 12,118 kilometres (7,530 mi) of roads in the areas controlled by the Republic of Cyprus in 2006, 7,850 kilometres (4,880 mi) were paved, while 4,268 kilometres (2,652 mi) were unpaved. In 1996, the Turkish Cypriot area showed a close, but smaller ratio of paved to unpaved with about 1,370 kilometres (850 mi) out of 2,350 kilometres (1,460 mi) paved and 980 kilometres (610 mi) unpaved. As a legacy of British rule, Cyprus is one of only three EU nations where vehicles drive on the left. In July 2025, the European Investment Bank (EIB) was reported to provide funds of €100 million for infrastructure improvement of road around the country.

=== Motorways ===
- A1 Nicosia to Limassol
- A2 connects A1 near Pera Chorio with A3 by Larnaca
- A3 Larnaca Airport to Agia Napa, also serves as a circular road for Larnaca.
- A5 connects A1 near Kofinou with A3 by Larnaca
- A6 Pafos to Limassol
- A7 Paphos to Polis (final plans)
- A9 Nicosia to Astromeritis
- A22 Dali industrial area to Anthoupolis, Lakatamia (Nicosia 3rd ring road, final plans)

== Public Transportation ==
Nicosia's residents rely on private cars to go around the city. With more than 658 automobiles per 1,000 people, Cyprus has one of the highest car ownership rates in the world and the country uses very little public transportation. In a June 2022 assessment, the European Investment Bank described low public transport use in Nicosia and recommended improving bus services before investing in tram infrastructure. In December 2025, Nicosia Municipality published proposals arising from a joint workshop with the Cyprus Scientific and Technical Chamber, including strengthening public transport and creating new transport hubs.

=== Public Transportation Companies ===
In Cyprus, public transportation by bus is run by different companies based on the district.

Nicosia and Larnaca: NPT (Nicosia Public Transport) and LPT (Larnaca Public Transport), operated by Cyprus Public Transport (CPT)

Limassol: EMEL (Transport Company for Limassol Commuters)

Paphos: OSYPA (Paphos Transport Organisation)

Famagusta: OSEA (Famagusta District Transport Organisation)

INTERCITY BUSES: Services transport between all major cities

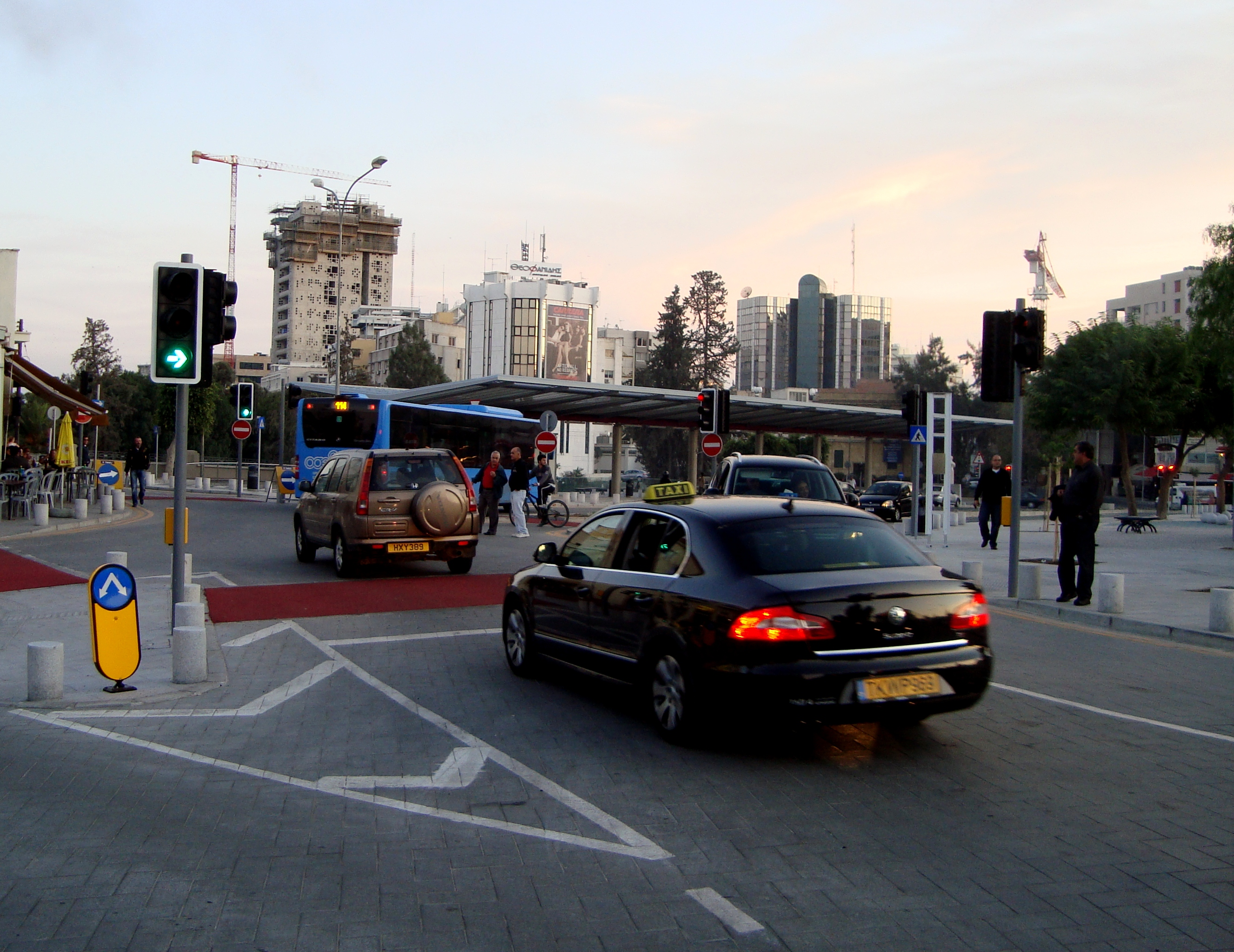
Solomos Square bus station

=== Public Buses ===
In 2006, extensive plans were announced to improve and expand bus services and restructure public transport throughout Cyprus, with the financial backing of the European Union Development Bank. In 2010, the new revised and expanded bus network was implemented into the system.

In 2020, the transport companies for the districts of Nicosia and Larnaca were changed from OSEL (Nicosia District Transport Organisation) to NPT (Nicosia Public Transport) and from ZENON Larnaca Buses to LPT (Larnaca Public Transport) respectively.

In 2022, Cyprus Public Transport made new plans for Nicosia's Public Transport by changing route numbers, adding new bus hubs and modernising buses and the all-out feel of the transport system. The plan has been introduced in two phases and is currently completed.

Towards the end of 2025 the Municipality of Larnaca begun implementing its Sustainable Urban Mobility Plan (SUMP) to create a safer, more accessible and sustainable transport system. Over 16 months until January 2027, the plan will deliver new cycling lanes, redesigned bus corridors, improved pavements, safer junctions and upgraded traffic systems, prioritising public transport, walking and cycling while enhancing road safety and urban quality.

=== Rail ===
Cyprus currently has no functioning railway systems. The last of the narrow gauge systems in the country closed in 1974. There had been studies and preparatory work done to establish a modern system between the major cities, motivated by worsening traffic issues. Ιn October 2024, a company in England showed their interest to construct a new railway system in Cyprus.

In 2018, Nicosia municipal authorities requested an opinion on the construction of a tram network in the city to the European Investment Bank's JASPERS strategists, who concluded a need for a phased approach. Relevant studies were also carried out in the past, but no concrete plans has materialised. In recent years there has been a joint call by European rail supply industry association (Unife) and Cyprus Railways Consortium, to restore for the first time since 1951, railroad lines to the island.

== Licensed Vehicles ==
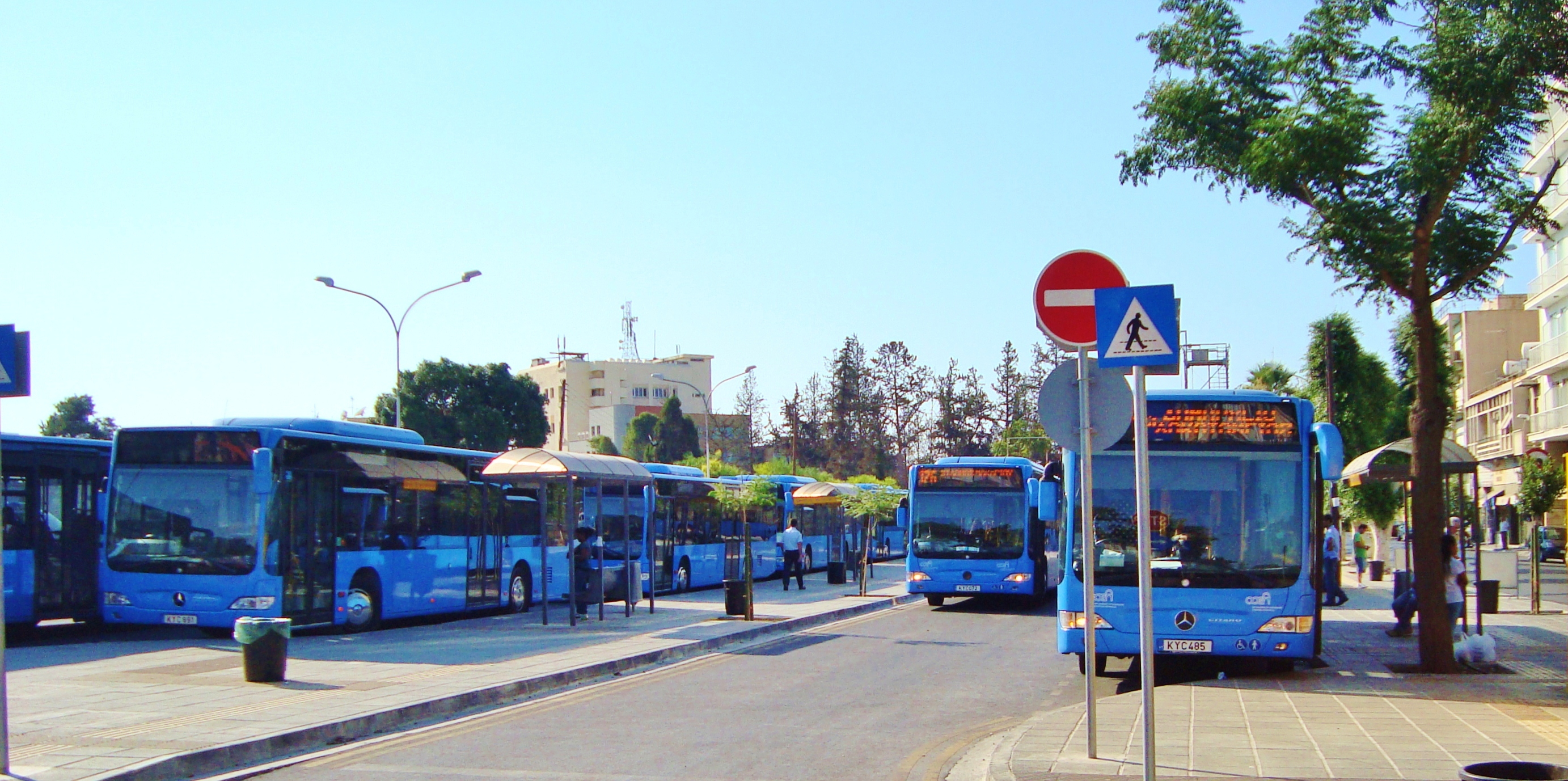
Public blue buses operated by OSEL in Solomos Square, Nicosia

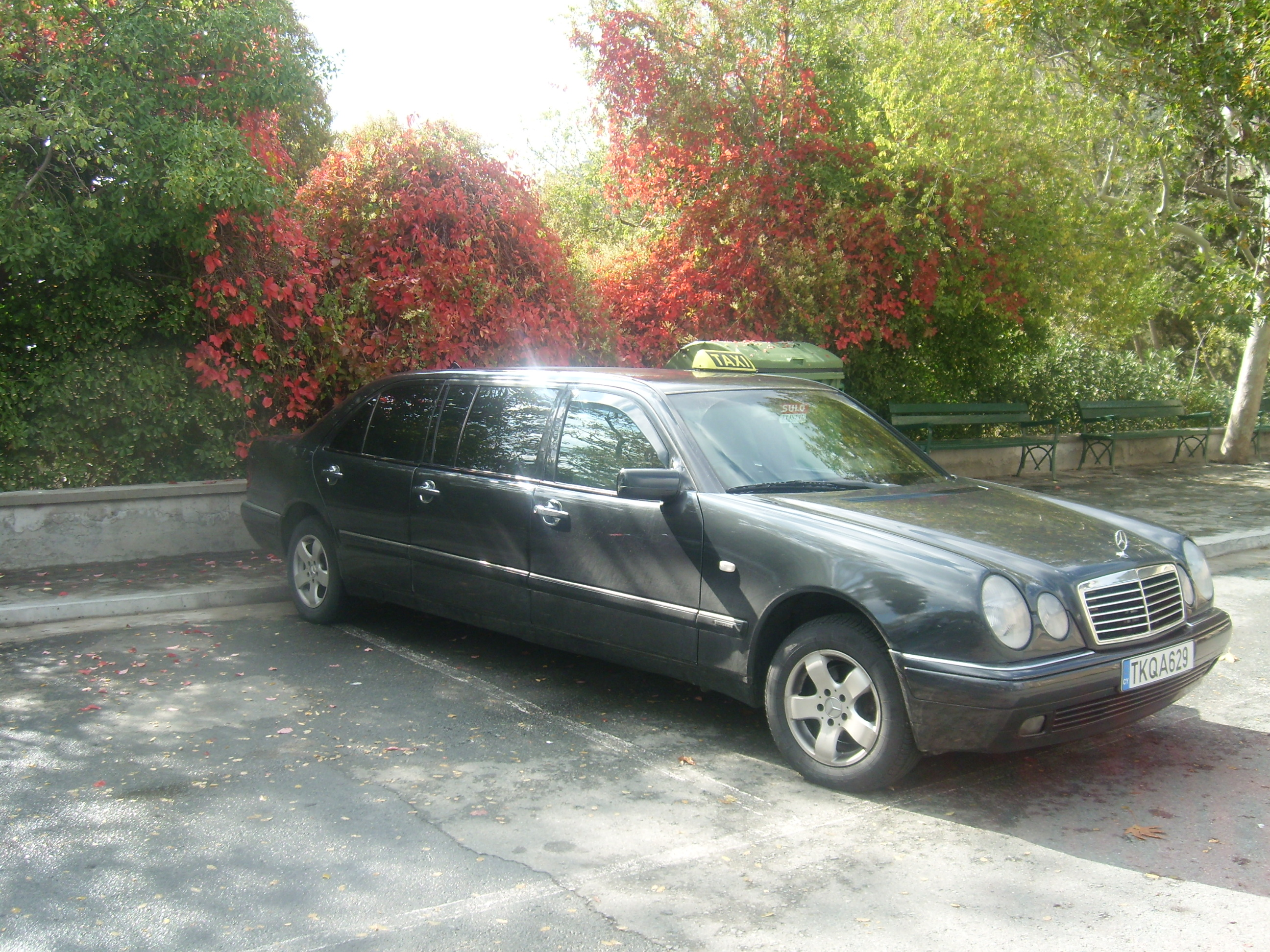
A taxi in Cyprus

Road transport is the dominant form of transport on the island. Figures released by the International Road Federation in 2007 show that Cyprus holds the highest car ownership rate in the world with 742 cars per 1,000 people.

Number of licensed vehicles
Vehicle Category	2016	2017	2018	2019	2020	2021	2022	2023	2024
TOTAL OF CARS	12,643.00	13,127.00	13,135.00	15,200.00	14,500.00	14,565.00	33,795.00	2,994.00	4,369.00

Public transport in Cyprus is limited to privately run bus services (except in Nicosia and Larnaca), taxis, and interurban 'shared' taxi services (locally referred to as service taxis). Thus, private car ownership in the country is the fifth highest per capita in the world. However, in 2006 extensive plans were announced to expand and improve bus services and restructure public transport throughout Cyprus, with the financial backing of the European Union Development Bank

== Sea Harbours and Ports ==
The ports of Cyprus are operated and maintained by the Cyprus Ports Authority. Major harbours of the island are Limassol Harbour, and Larnaca Harbour, which service cargo, passenger, and cruise ships. Limassol is the larger of the two, and handles a large volume of both cargo and cruise vessels. Larnaca is primarily a cargo port but played a big part in the evacuation of foreign nationals from Lebanon in 2006, and in the subsequent humanitarian aid effort. A smaller cargo dock also exists at Vasilikos, near Zygi (a small town between Larnaca and Limassol). Smaller vessels and private yachts can dock at Marinas in Cyprus.

== Public Bicycle Sharing System ==
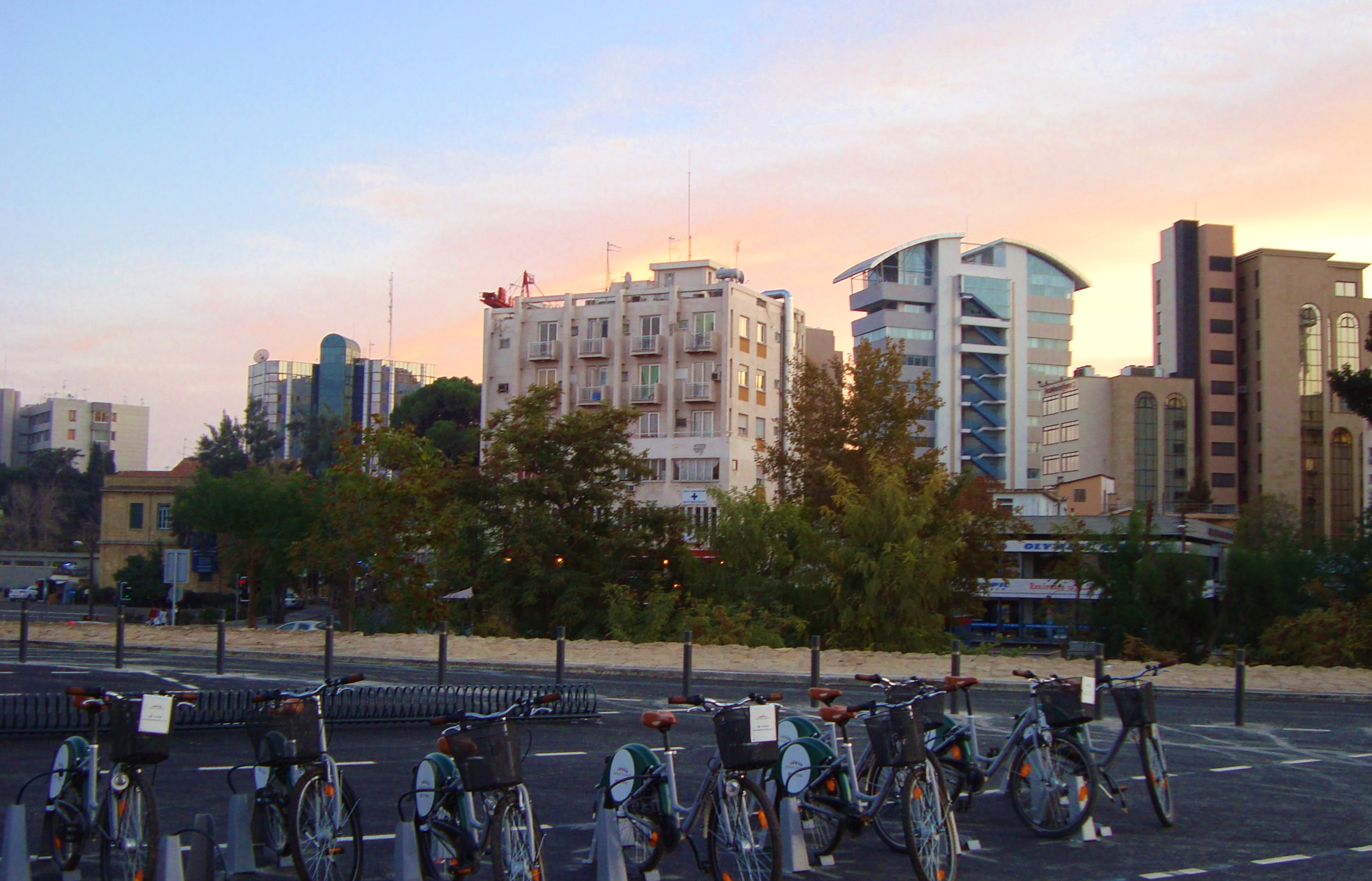
Public bicycles in Nicosia

Nextbike is the latest transportation system in Cyprus, similar to programs employed successfully in various cities around the world. Bicycles can be found at stations in Nicosia and Limassol, as well as with 1 station in Larnaca.

== Merchant Marine ==
See full article on Cyprus Merchant Marine

Total: 1,414 ships (with a volume of 1,000 gross tonnage (GT) or over) totaling 23,497,776 GT/37,331,506 tonnes deadweight (DWT)

Ships by Type: barge carrier 2, bulk carrier 442, cargo ship 495, chemical tanker 22, combination bulk 40, combination ore/oil 8, container ship 144, Liquified Gas Carrier 6, passenger ship 8, petroleum tanker 142, refrigerated cargo 41, roll-on/roll-off 45, short-sea passenger 13, specialized tanker 4, vehicle carrier 2 (1999 est.)

== Airports ==
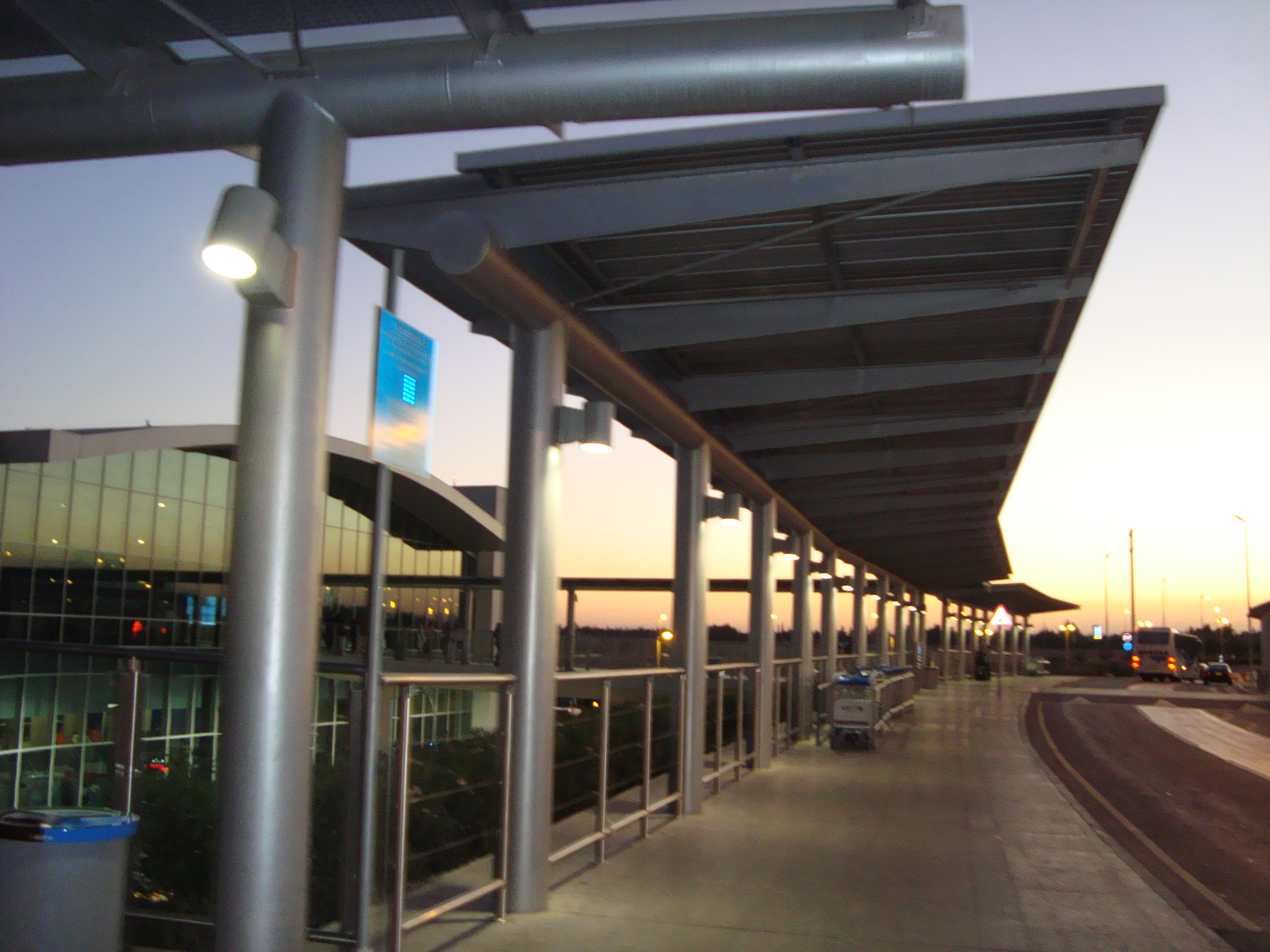
Larnaca International Airport

In 1999, Cyprus had 12 airports with paved runways. Of them, seven had runways of lengths between 2,438 and 3,047 metres, one had a length between 1,524 and 2,437 metres, three had lengths between 914 and 1524 metres, and one had a length less than 914 metres.

Of the three airports with unpaved runways, two had lengths less than 914 metres and one had a length between 914 and 1524 metres.

=== International airports ===
Larnaca International Airport is the island's main airport and flies to many locations worldwide.

Paphos International Airport is the 2nd largest airport and mostly flies to Europe, via Ryanair; with occasional flights to other continents.

Nicosia International Airport is an abandoned airport. It used to be the island's main airport until 1974. It remains closed to the public.

Ercan International Airport is the main airport in the de facto state of Northern Cyprus. The airport's only destination is Turkey, serviced only by a few airlines from Turkey. Flights to and from Ercan Airport are embargoed.
