= Road runway =

Section of a public road acting as a runway for aircraft

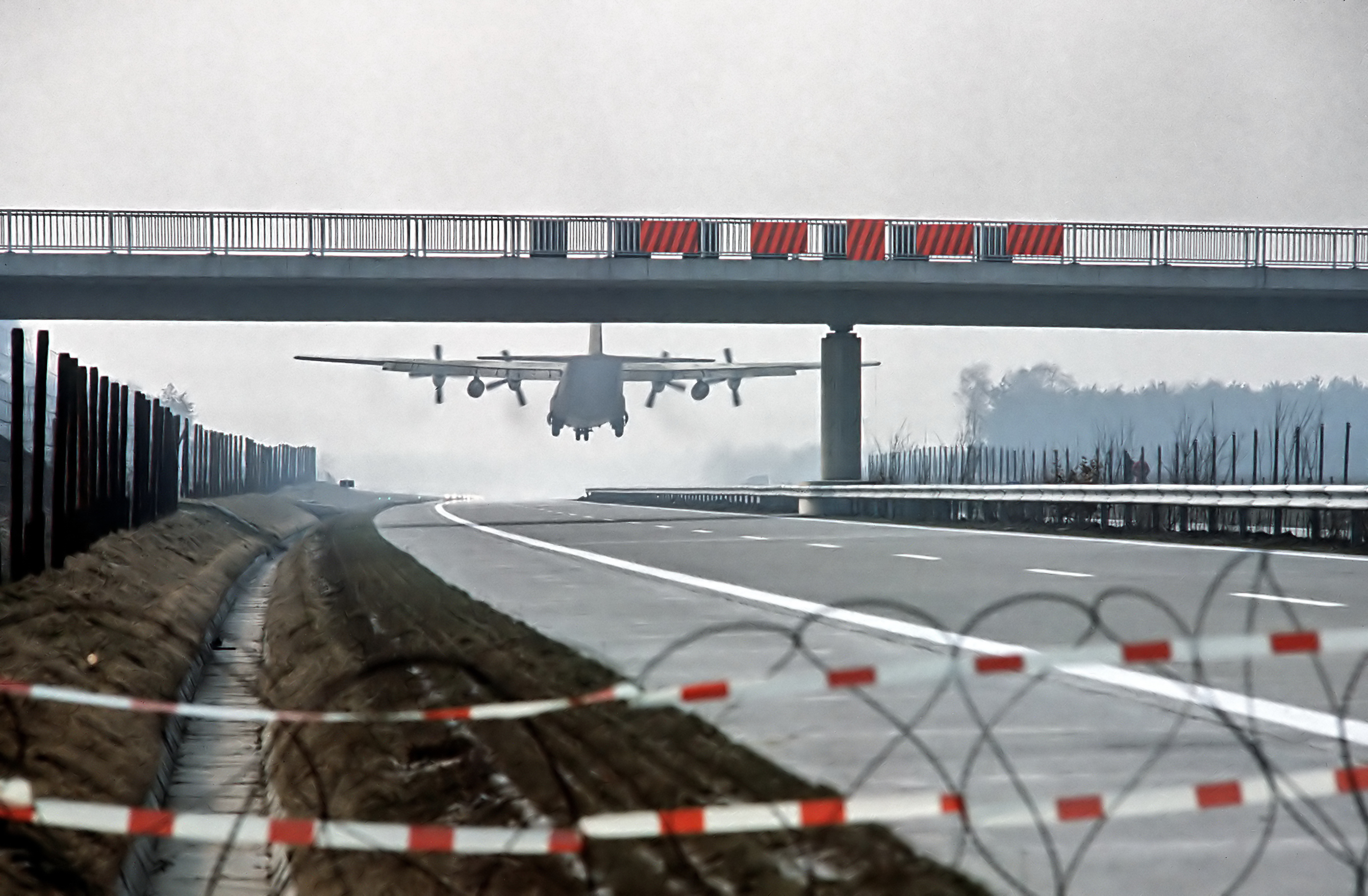
A Lockheed C-130 Hercules about to land on the West German Bundesautobahn 29 (A29 Autobahn) near Ahlhorn during military exercise 'Highway 84'.

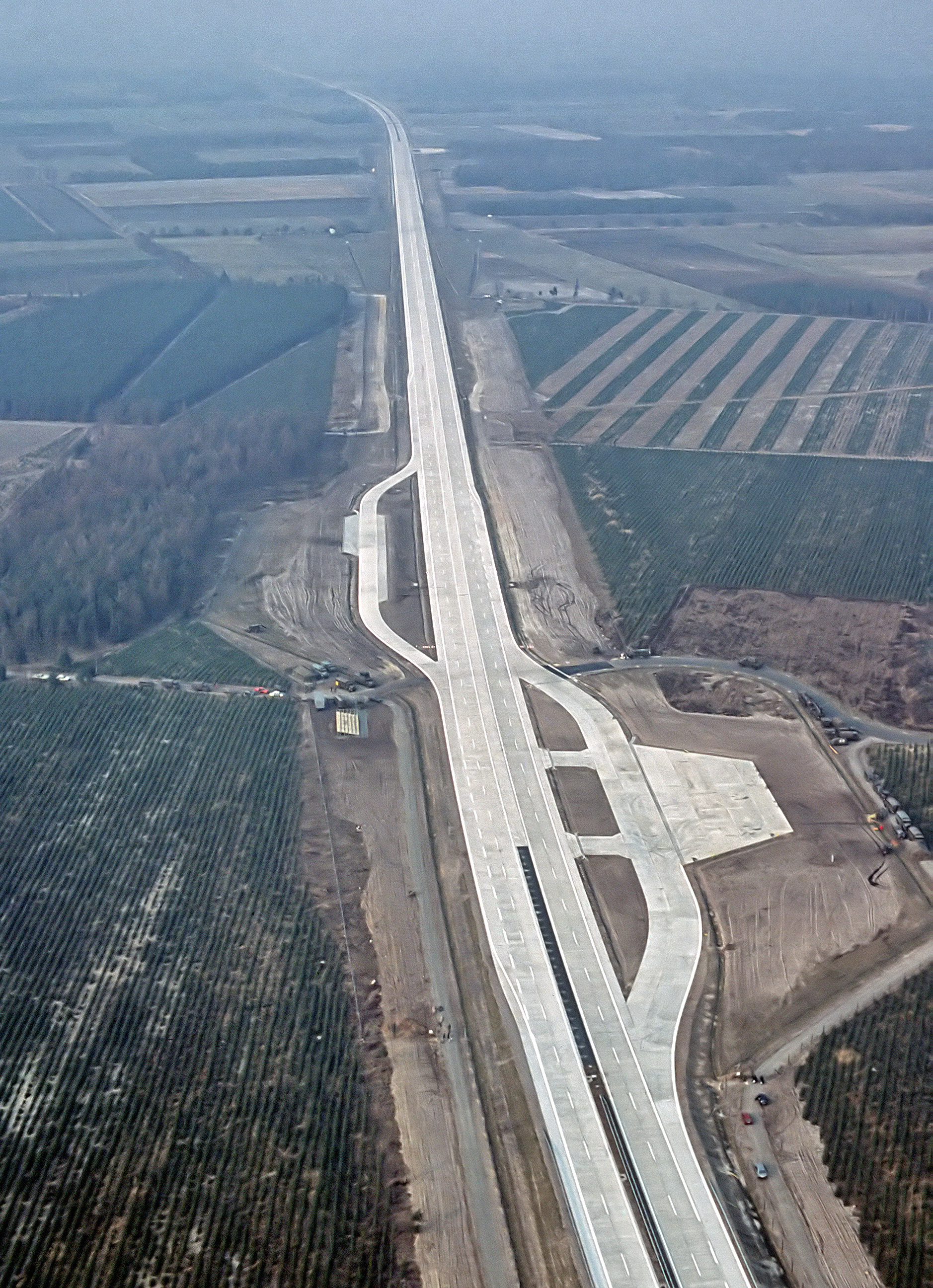
Road runway on the West German Bundesautobahn 29 (A29 Autobahn) near Ahlhorn.

A road runway or road base or highway airstrip (US), is a section of an automotive public road, highway, motorway, or similar, that is specially built (or adapted) to act as a runway for (primarily) military aircraft, and to serve as an emergency or auxiliary military airbase. These road runways allow military aircraft to continue operating even if the runway at their respective airbases (some of the most high-priority targets in any war) are degraded, damaged, or destroyed.

The first road runways were constructed towards the end of World War II in Nazi Germany, where the well-developed Reichsautobahn system allowed their military aircraft to use their motorways. During the Cold War, road runways were systematically built on both sides of the Iron Curtain, in many cases in response to the Six Day War and Operation Focus in 1967, where the Israeli Air Force in a surprise air strike disabled many of their opponents' air bases in just a few hours. Countries which have built road runways include both West and East Germany, Singapore, North Korea, Taiwan, Sweden, Finland, Bulgaria, Switzerland (military significance), Poland, India, Pakistan, and Czechoslovakia.

== Design ==
The road runways are typically 2 to 3.5 kilometres (1.2 to 2.2 miles) straight sections of the road or highway, where any central reservation is made of crash barriers that can be removed quickly (in order to allow aeroplanes to use the whole width of the road). Other features of an airbase (taxiways, aircraft parking aprons) may also be built. The road will need a thicker-than-normal surface and a solid concrete base. The specialised equipment of a typical airfield are stored somewhere nearby, and only moved to the road runway when airfield operations start. The road runways can be converted from motorways to airbases typically within 24-to-48 hours. The road would need to be swept to remove any FOD debris before use by aircraft. Road runways can however also be quite small; the short runways built in the Swedish Bas 90 system are commonly only 800 metres (2,600 feet) in length. The STOL-capability of the Viggen and Gripen allowed for such short runways. In the case of Finnish road airbases, the space needed for landing aircraft is reduced by means of a wire, similar to the CATOBAR system used on some aircraft carriers.

== Around the world ==
A number of countries around the world use the strategy of highways constructed to double as auxiliary runways for nearby airbases in the event of war.

=== Australia ===
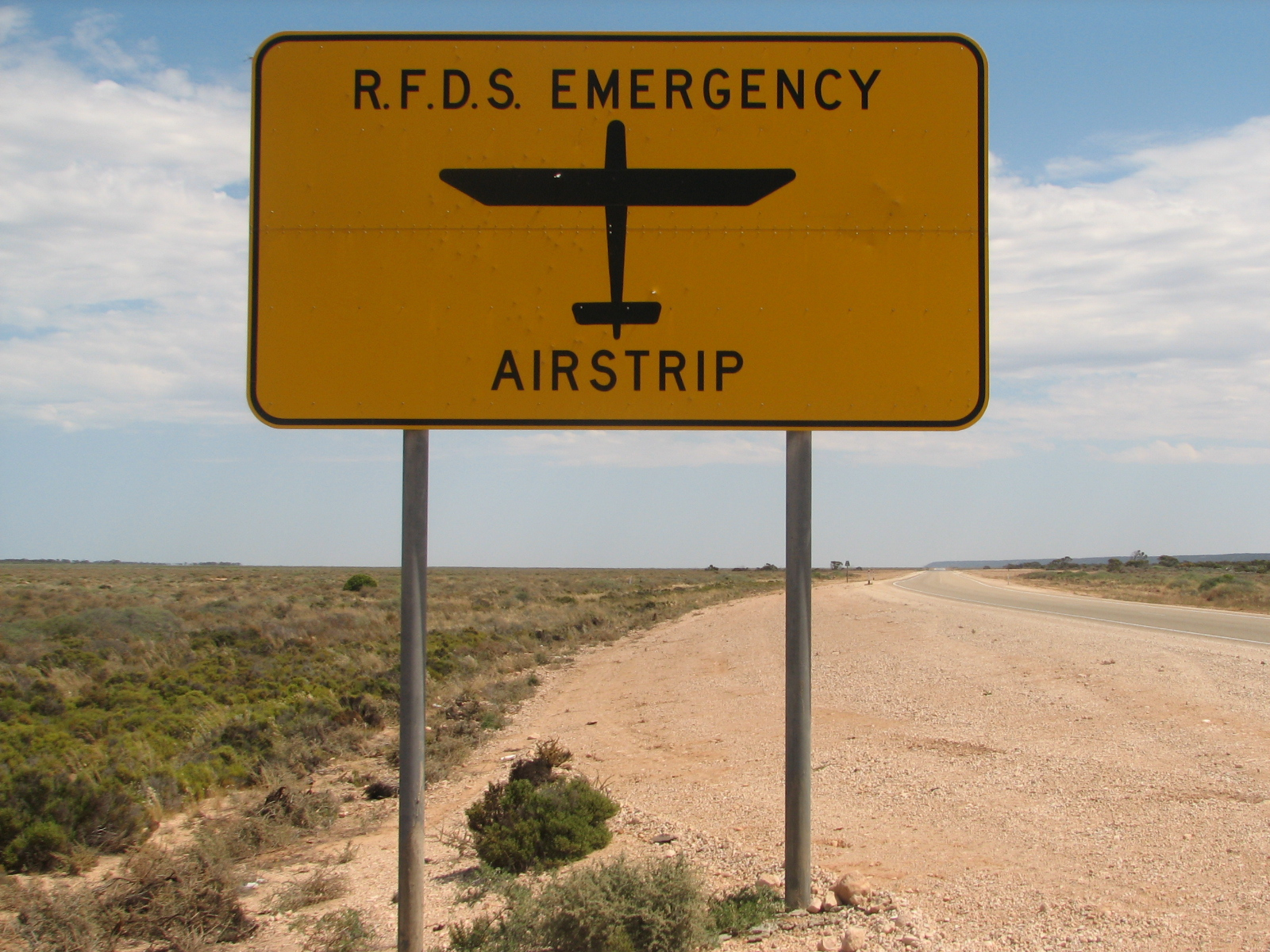
A sign on the Eyre Highway in Australia indicating that a Royal Flying Doctor Service (RFDS) emergency airstrip is ahead; there are four such strips on the highway.

While not designed for military use, in outback Australia, some sections of highway are maintained as emergency runways for use by the Royal Flying Doctor Service (RFDS).

=== Bosnia and Herzegovina ===
In Glamoč, Bosnia and Herzegovina, the M15 road was used as a military airstrip. There is a clear example of how the road was widened for the needs of aeroplane landing.

=== China ===
In 1989, China conducted its first road runway drills. They have since been conducted at later dates, and in different areas of the country. In 2014, Chinese forces landed military aircraft on a road runway in Henan province for the first time.

=== Croatia ===
Very close to the Grobničko Polje Airfield, the part of the A6 highway on the Orehovica – Kikovica section is arranged for the landing of all types of military and civilian planes. The plain, 2000 meters long, ran along the edge of the Grobničko polje. In case of need, that flat part of the highway could easily be turned into a runway. In the middle, which divided the two lanes of the highway, there were ordinary bollards, which could be removed and a nice wide runway would be obtained that allowed landing.

=== Cyprus ===
After the Turkish invasion of Cyprus, three road runways were built in the non-occupied areas of Cyprus, easily recognisable by a runway centre line and markings for the touchdown zone. They also have aircraft turning areas at either end. One is located on the A1 Limassol–Nicosia highway (5,200 metres (17,100 feet)) and one near the western end of the A5 Limassol–Larnaca highway (5,000 metres (16,000 feet)). The third is a much smaller strip located on the A6 Limassol-Paphos highway near to Paphos International Airport.

=== Czech Republic ===
In the Czech Republic, road runways are called 'the airport section of the highway' (Czech: letištní úsek dálnice (LÚD)). There are two existing road runways. One on highway D1 (km 136.8 to 139.2) near Měřín, 2,100 metres (6,900 feet) long by 25.5 metres (84 feet) wide. It was finished in 1976, and was used for exercise landings and take-offs in 1980, 1982, and 1985. The second road runway is on highway D46 (km 1.4 to 4.2), and it is designed as backup take-off and landing runway for Vyškov Airport. Many more were planned, but not built.

=== Estonia ===
During the Operation Saber Strike exercises in Estonia in 2016 and 2018, A-10 Thunderbolt II aircraft from the United States Air National Guard operated from former Warsaw Pact road runways in Estonia.

=== Finland ===
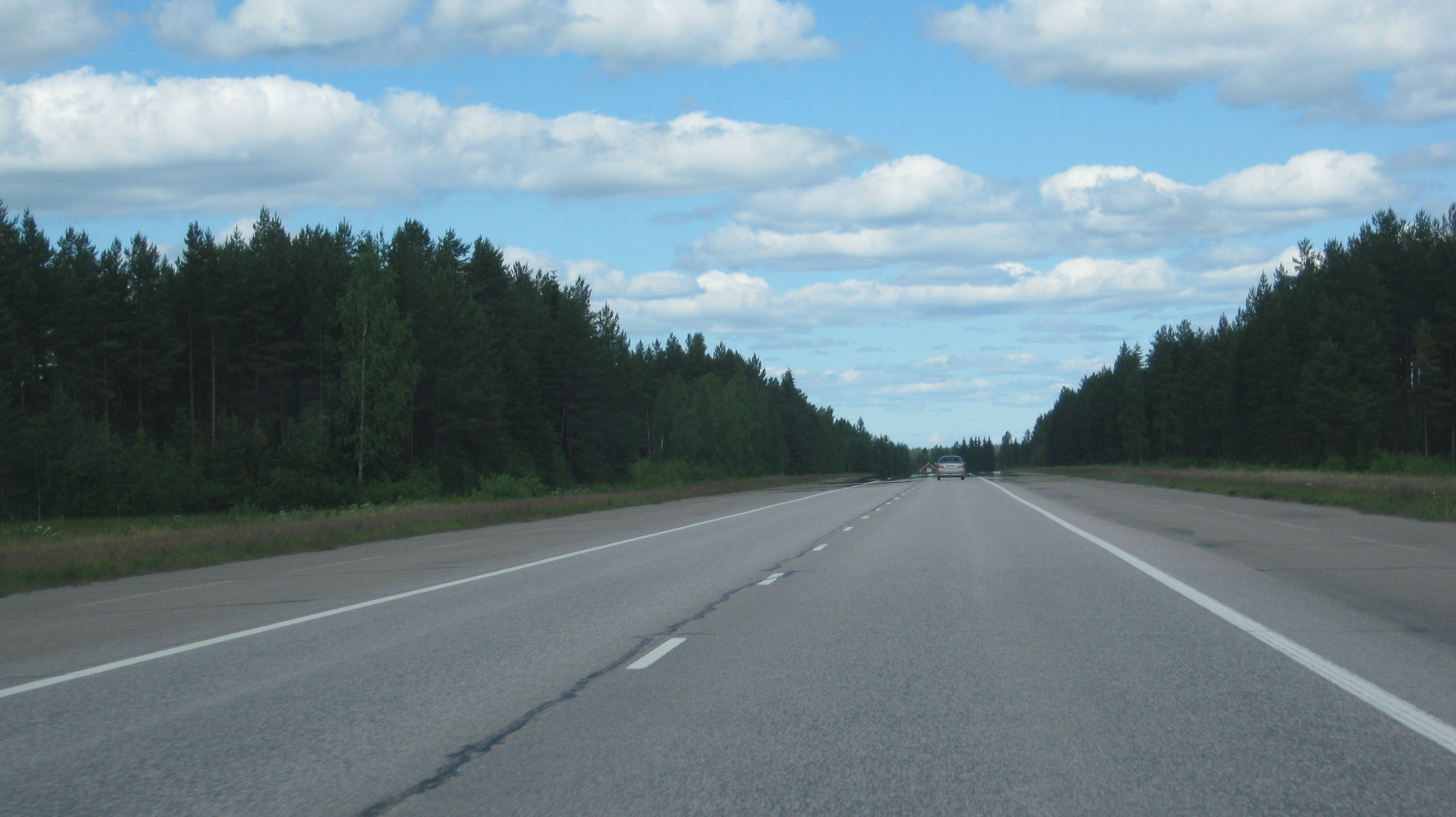
Alavus road runway in Finland.

In the Winter War of 1939-1940, the Finnish Air Force re-deployed its aircraft to makeshift airfields, including frozen lakes, to preserve them against Soviet air attack. The tactic was successful, with Soviet air raids on bases causing little damage, and the vastly outnumbered Finnish aircraft scoring a high number of aerial victories.

Throughout the Cold War, the Finnish Air Force maintained a network of secondary airfields, including civilian airports and road bases, to improve survivability and effectiveness in the event of war.

As of 2017, all aircraft in the Finnish Air Force are capable of operating from road bases.

Currently Finland conducts drills on its road bases (Finnish: maantietukikohta), around once a year. In the Baana 16 exercise in 2016, the Finnish Air Force flew F/A-18C and BAE Hawk, Pilatus PC-12, and C295M aircraft from a highway in Lusi. The Finnish Air Force uses arresting cables to quickly stop F/A-18s, which were originally designed to operate from aircraft carriers. The Swedish Air Force also took part in the 2015 and 2016 exercises, flying Gripen fighters. The Royal Norwegian Air Force took part in the 2023 exercise, flying F-35 fighter.

=== Germany ===
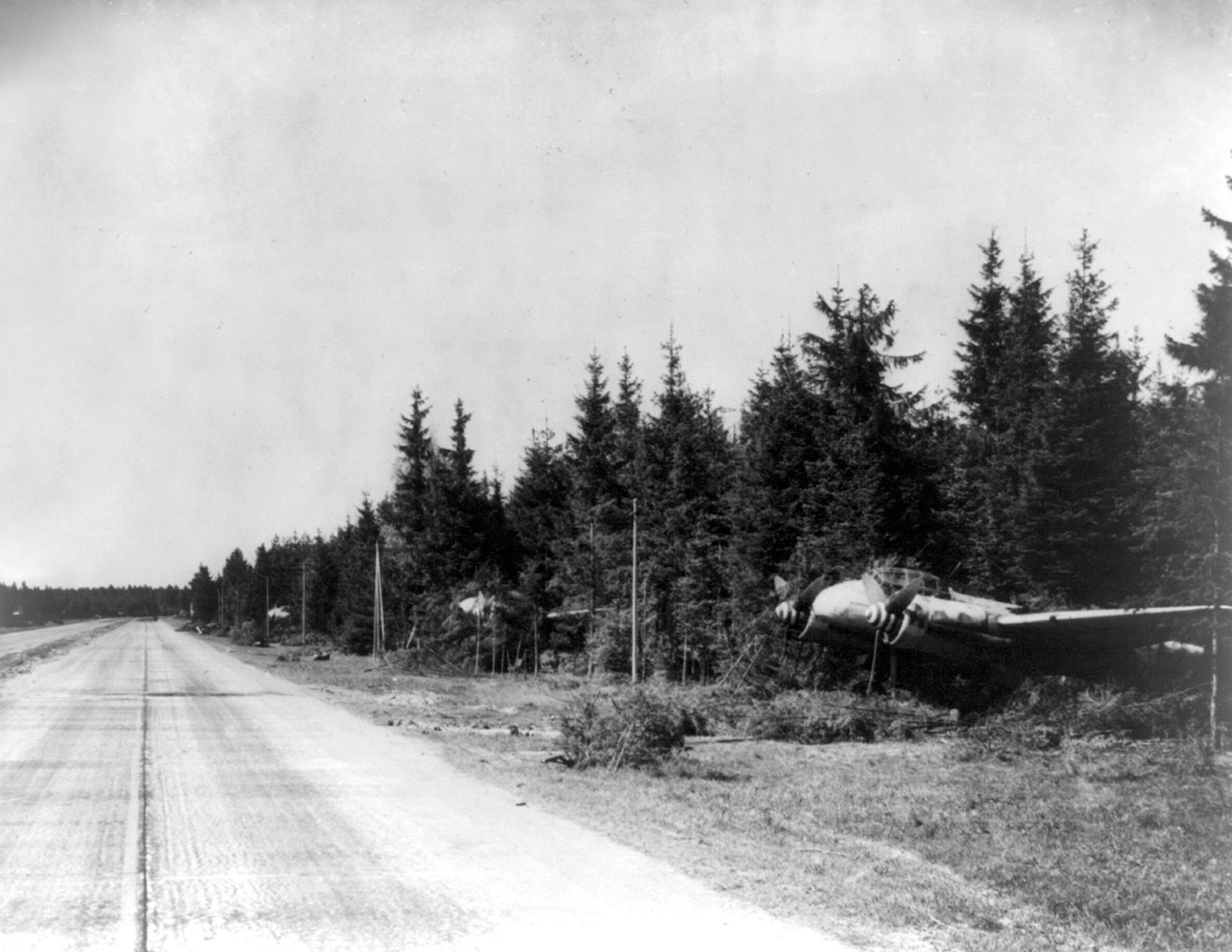
German Reichsautobahn road runway in World War II (Spring 1945), with Ju 88 heavy fighters parked on the shoulders.

During the Cold War, the Bundeswehr established 25 emergency landing sites (Notlandeplätze, or NLP) across Germany, based on concepts developed in Switzerland and Sweden. These sites were constructed on straight motorway sections approximately 2,000 (some 2,500) meters in length, featuring concreted medians, removable guardrails, designated parking areas for mobile control towers and aircraft, and underground fuel storage. One such site was located on the A29 motorway near Ahlhorn, where in 1984 the German Air Force and the United States Air Force conducted exercises involving aircraft such as the F-4 Phantom, F-16 Falcon, A-10 Thunderbolt II, C-160 Transall, and C-130 Hercules.

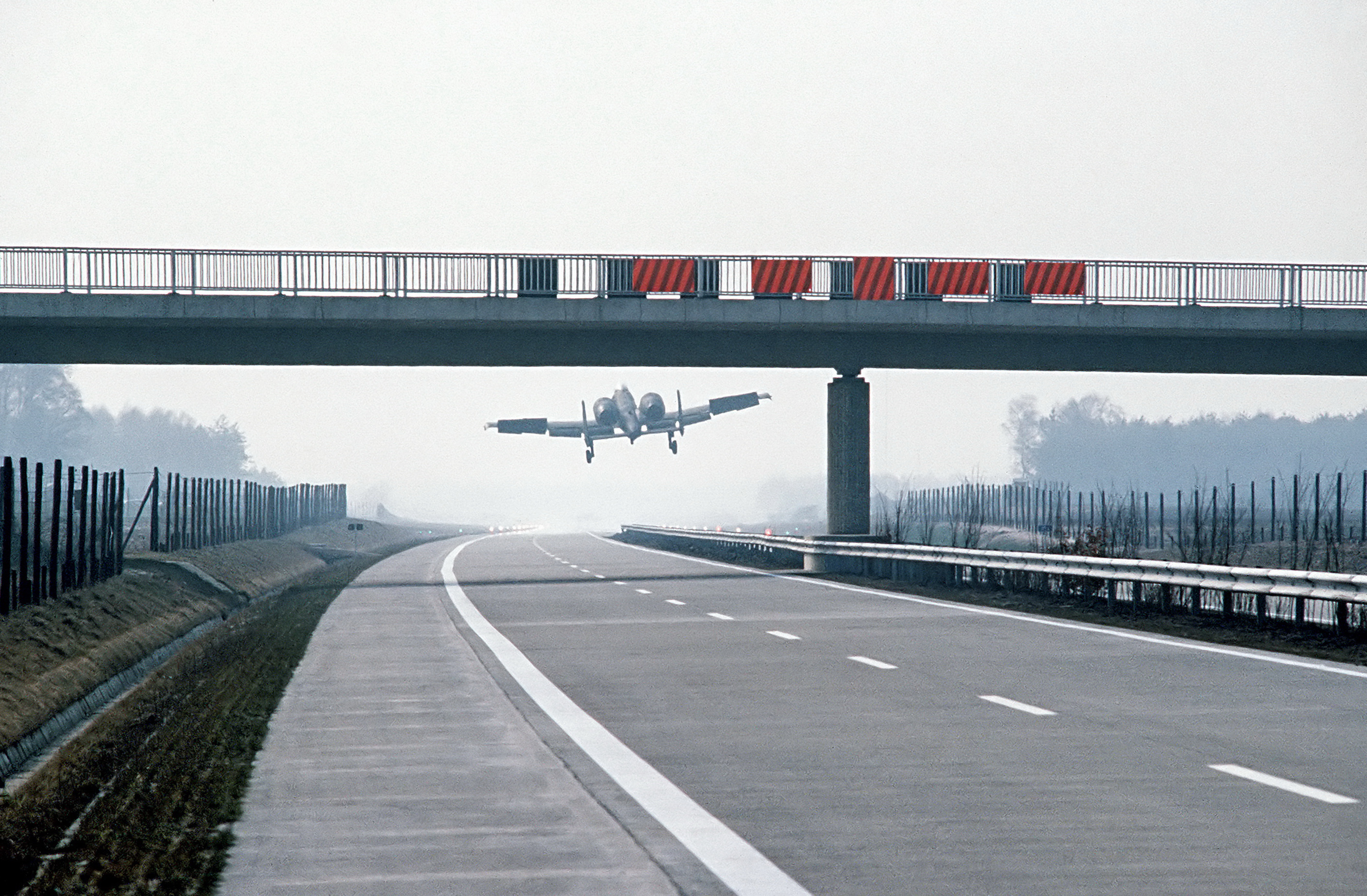
USAF A-10 Thundebolts landing on the Autobahn

The use of these emergency landing sites declined after the 1980s as the Bundeswehr gained access to a larger and more capable network of dedicated military and civilian airfields. Improvements in airbase infrastructure, aircraft operations, and NATO airfield planning also reduced the need to rely on motorways as temporary runways. Following the end of the Cold War and the restructuring of the German armed forces, the strategic importance of these sites diminished further. As a result, the emergency landing sites were gradually decommissioned and are no longer maintained or equipped for operational military use. Today, many of the former sites have been incorporated back into the normal motorway system, although some still retain visible features of their original military purpose, such as unusually straight sections of road, wide medians, or former parking and access areas..

=== India ===
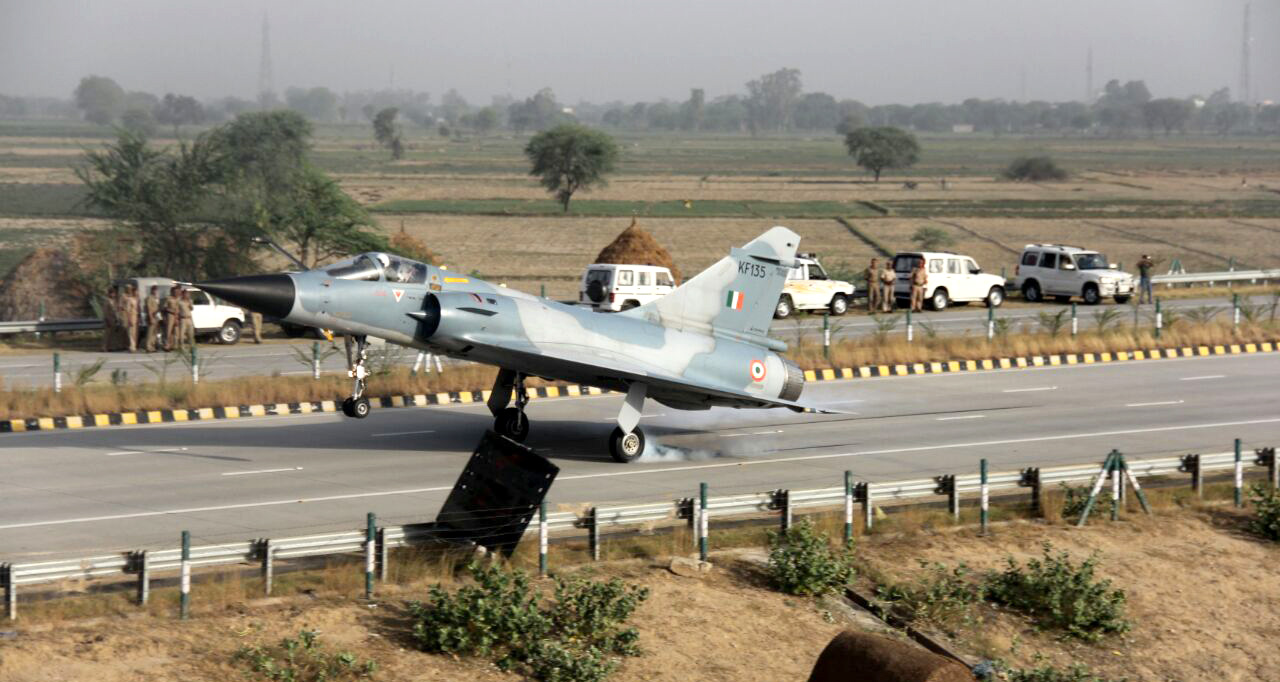
IAF Mirage 2000 landing on the Yamuna Expressway ELF field.

In India, road runways are called 'emergency landing facilities' (ELF). ELFs are activated in the states of Uttar Pradesh, Rajasthan, Andhra Pradesh,Assam and union territory of Jammu and Kashmir. A total thirteen locations have been chosen for development of such road runways.

- Yamuna Expressway: India has successfully tested its road runway on a stretch of the Yamuna Expressway in Uttar Pradesh on 21 May 2015. It was built at a cost of ₹130 billion for its combat jets of the Indian Air Force (IAF), a first for military aviation in the country. In June 2016, the Minister of Road Transport and Highways, Nitin Gadkari announced that the government was considering developing 'road runways' for commercial operations as well.
- Agra–Lucknow Expressway (Lucknow): The Bangarmau Airstrip is located 65 km (40 mi) from Lucknow on the expressway and has been tested multiple times since 2015 with fighter aircraft and military transport aircraft.
- National Highway 925 (Barmer): on 9 September 2021, the Minister of Road Transport and Highways, Nitin Gadkari, and the Minister of Defence, Rajnath Singh, inaugurated India's first road runway on a National Highway NH925 in Barmer, Rajasthan and, a mock emergency landing was conducted with the two ministers and the Air Chief Marshal R. K. S. Bhadauria on-board a military transport aircraft.
- National Highway 16 (Bapatla): an emergency landing facility airstrip was activated on National Highway 16 on 18 March 2024. The 4.1 kilometres (2.5 miles) long by 33 metres (108 feet) wide strip has been constructed by the National Highways Authority of India. Aircraft, including Sukhoi Su-30MKI, BAE Systems Hawk, Antonov An-32, and Dornier 228, conducted landing trials on the same day.
- National Highway 44 (Anantnag): an ELF was tested on 2 April 2023 from 03:45 to 04:30 am in Jammu and Kashmir's Anantnag district. The road runway is 3.5 kilometres (2.2 miles) long. Five helicopters, including two Chinook, two Dhruv, and one Mi-17 of IAF were part of the trial. It also included Sukhoi Su-30MKI and HAL Tejas. The road runway construction started in 2020 at a cost of ₹119 crore (equivalent to ₹153 crore or US$16 million in 2026).
- Ganga Expressway: Indian Air Force fighter jets and transport aircraft conducted landing and take-off drills on 2 May 2025 from its 3.5 km (2.2 mi)-long airstrip on the Expressway near Shahjahanpur. This is the first such airstrip in India with night landing capacity. To assess the capability the drill was conducted in two phases in both day and night (9 pm to 10 pm IST). The aircraft included Su-30MKI, Mirage 2000, MiG-29, Jaguar, C-130J Super Hercules, An-32, and the Mi-17 V5 helicopter.
- Moran Bypass: An ELF was activated on the Moran Bypass of National Highway-37 in the Dibrugarh district, Assam on 14 February 2026. Built at a cost of Rs.100 crores,It was inaugurated with a landing by an IAF C-130J during the Prime Minister's visit to the state.Spanning over 4.6 kilometres,It is the First ELF located in Northeast India.

=== Indonesia ===
The Indonesian Air Force conducted its first use of road runway in February 2026, when F-16 and EMB 314 aircraft landed and took off from a 3,000 meters stretch of the Terbanggi Besar–Pematang Panggang Toll Road in southern Sumatra. The air force plans to have at least 38 road runways spread across the country. In July 2026, the Ministry of Public Works announced that work is underway to convert three other toll roads into makeshift runways.

=== Japan ===
In Hokkaido, the Japan Self-Defense Forces (JSDF) have Kenebetsu Air Base and Yakumo Sub Base as alternative airbases.

=== North Korea ===
North Korea has established a large number of road runways to use in case of war.

=== Pakistan ===
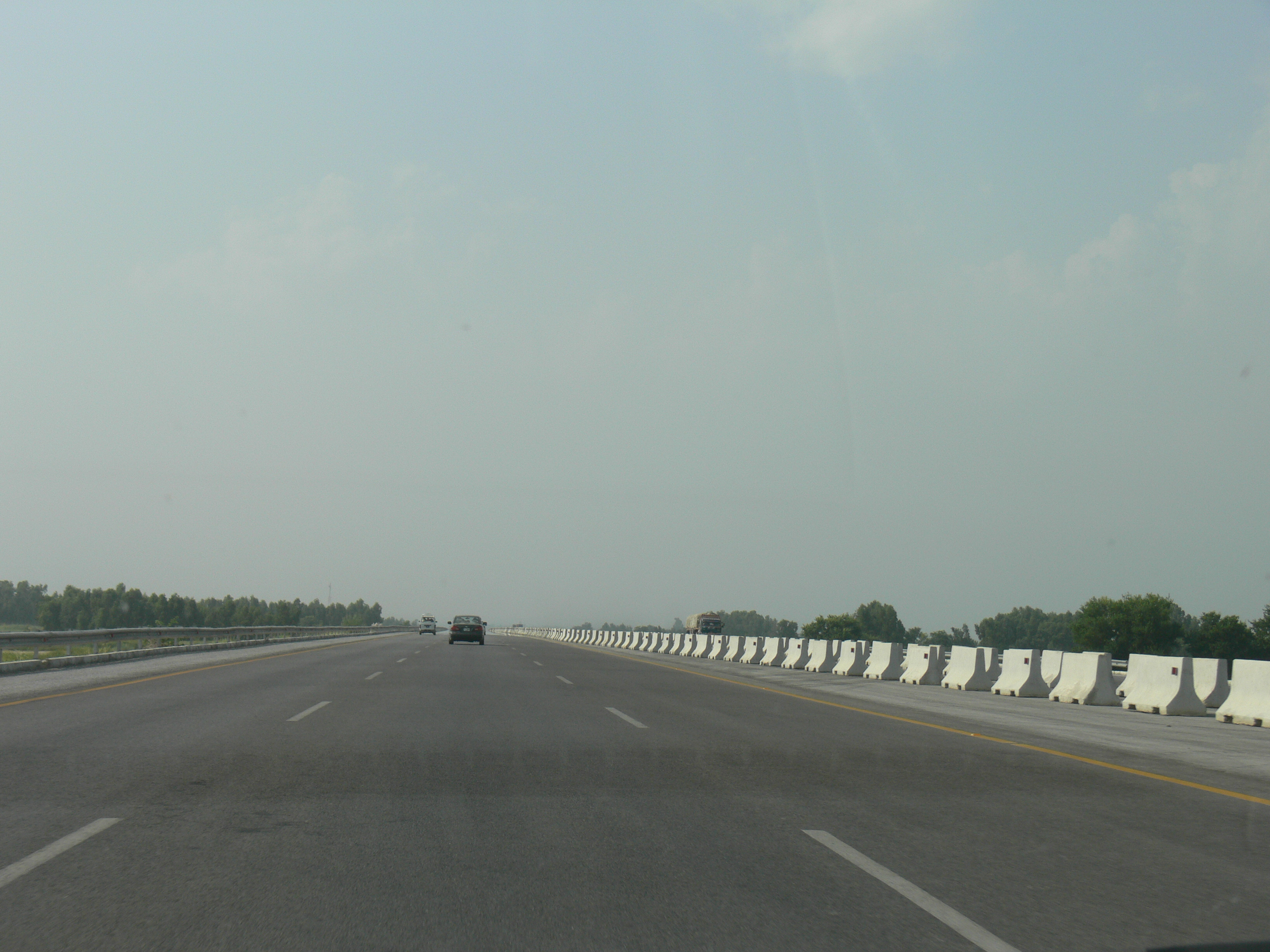
Road runway section on Pakistan's M-1 Motorway with removable medians.

In Pakistan, the M-1 Motorway (Peshawar-Islamabad) and the M-2 Motorway (Islamabad-Lahore) each include two emergency runway sections of 2,700 metres (8,900 feet) length each. The four emergency runway sections become operational by removing removable concrete medians using forklifts. The Pakistan Air Force (PAF) has used the M2 motorway as a road runway on two occasions: for the first time in 2000 when it landed an F-7P fighter, a Super Mushak trainer, and a C-130 transport, and again, in 2010. On the last occasion, the PAF used a road runway section on the M2 motorway on 2 April 2010, to land, refuel, and take-off two jet fighters; a Mirage III and an F-7P, during its Highmark 2010 exercise. In March 2019, Pakistan also used a section of M2 motorway to land its fighter jets to demonstrate its capability.

=== Poland ===
A large number of road runways (DOL – Polish: Drogowy Odcinek Lotniskowy, lit 'road airfield section') were built during the Cold War in Poland. As of 2003, only one highway strip is used annually for an exercise.

=== Singapore ===
The Republic of Singapore Air Force (RSAF) periodically conducts an 'alternate runway exercise'. It was first conducted on 17 April 1986 with F-5 and A-4 aircraft. The seventh exercise, 'Torrent 2016-, was conducted near Tengah Air Base in November 2016. Signs, street lights and other fixtures were removed, and landing equipment installed temporarily, which included mobile arresting gear for the first time. F-15SG and F-16C/D fighters participated in the 2016 exercise.

=== South Korea ===
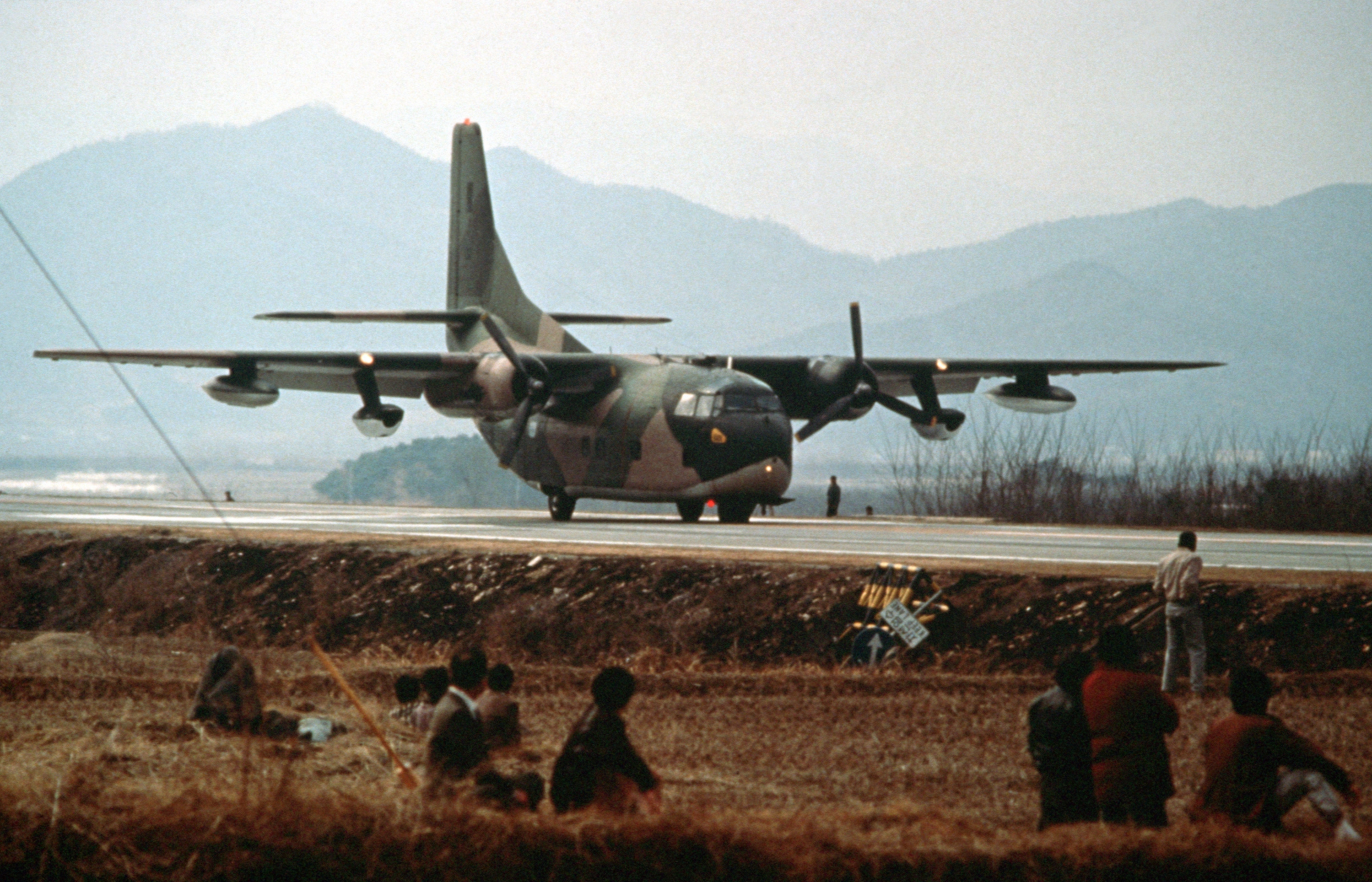
A Republic of Korea Air Force Fairchild C-123K Provider aircraft waits to pick up troops at a road runway during the joint South Korean / United States exercise "Team Spirit '89" on 24 March 1989.

As with North Korea, South Korea has also established a number of road runways.

=== Soviet Union ===
A large number of road runways were built in the former USSR (Russian: Аэродромный Участок Дороги, 'airfield part of road').

=== Sri Lanka ===
Tamil separatist group Liberation Tigers of Tamil Eelam (LTTE) operated in northern Sri Lanka prior to their elimination in 2009, used highways as road runways.

=== Sweden ===
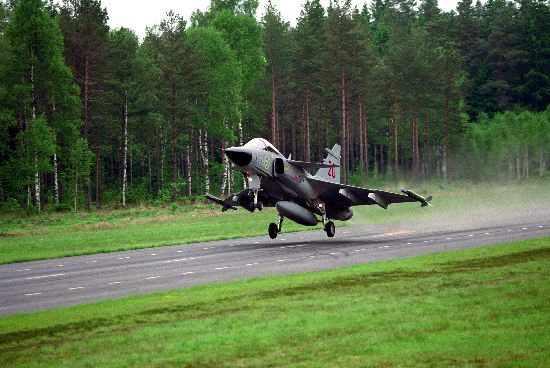
JAS 39 Gripen of the Swedish Air Force taking off from a road runway.

Sweden started establishing road runways (Swedish: reservvägbaser) as alternative bases with the introduction of the Bas 60 system in the late 1950s. The Six-Day War in 1967 (where the Egyptian Air Force was grounded by a quick surprise attack on airbases) and the introduction of long range attack aircraft (primarily the Su-24) inspired further development, resulting in the Bas 90 system. Improvements in the Bas 90 system included construction of short backup runways in the direct vicinity of the airbases and further dispersion of ground operations. The Viggen and the Gripen were both designed with STOL capability in order to utilise shorter runways.

The Swedish Air Force did not practice using their road bases for around a decade in the early 21st century, but in 2015 and 2016, its Saab JAS 39 Gripen fighters participated in Finnish Air Force road base drills. In September 2017, the air force conducted exercises on a number of road bases for the first time in over a decade.

In preparation for NATO integration, United States aircraft have completed some landings on these road strips in the 2020s, even if they are considered too narrow according to NATO standard, and too short for most military aircraft.

=== Switzerland ===
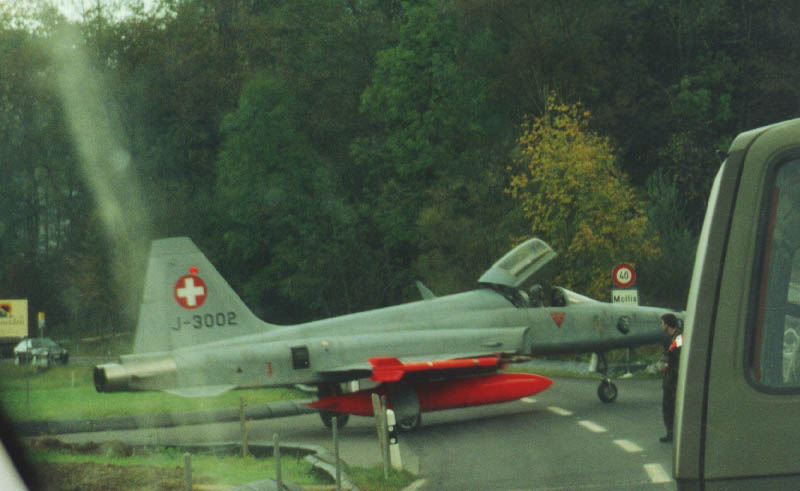
A Swiss Air Force F-5E Tiger II crossing a road between the runway and an aircraft cavern (Mollis airfield, 1999).

A number of road runways called NOLA or NOSTA (German: Notlandepisten) were created from 1969 to 2004.

- Oensingen, A1 motorway; training: 1970 STRADA with Venom
- Münsingen, A6 motorway; training: 1974 STRADA with Venom, Hunter and P-3. 1982 TAUTO with Hunter and Tiger
- Flums, A13 motorway; training: 1977 NOLA with Hunter and anti-aircraft warfare (AA), 1985 TAUTO with Hunter and Tiger
- Alpnach, A8 motorway (NOSTA) connected to Alpnach Air Base; training: 1978 NOSTA with Hunter
- Lodrino, A2 motorway connected to Lodrino Air Base; training: 1991 STRADA with Hunter, Tiger and AA
- Bex, A9 motorway; training: 1980 ABEX with 36 Hunter
- Sion, A9 motorway connected to Sion Airbase; training: 1988 with Tiger
- Payerne, A1 motorway connected to Payerne Air Base; training: 5 June 2024, with F/A-18 Hornet.

=== Taiwan ===
Taiwan built a number of road runways (Chinese: 戰備跑道, lit. 'war spare runway').

=== Thailand ===
Following several proposals made by the Joint Thai-US Military Research and Development Center, three road runways were constructed in 1963, and were put out of service in 1975-76.

- Route 11, Ban Nom Lom 18°18'03"N 99°24'24"E
- Route 11, Hang Chat 18°19'11"N 99°19'21"E
- Route 11, Ban Klang 18°34'17"N 99°02'38"E

These road runways were most likely operated by the nearby former Lampang Airbase.

=== United Kingdom ===
During the Cold War, the Royal Air Force (RAF) launched Jaguar aircraft from a newly-completed section of the M55 motorway between Preston and Blackpool. Areas such as Teesside, Southend, and Liverpool have been considered for road runway areas, as large civilian airports such as Glasgow and Heathrow would be unavailable. Another advantage to this is that the more the jet fighters are spread, the harder it is for the enemy to target.

=== United States ===
A persistent myth claims that it is a legal requirement that "one mile in every five must be straight for use as an airstrip in times of war or other emergencies". However, no legislation containing this provision was ever passed. The Defense Highway Act of 1941 provided for the operation of 'flight strips' alongside highways, but did not mandate the use of the road itself.

For Exercise Northern Strike 2021, A-10 Thunderbolt IIs from the 354th Fighter Squadron and the 127th Wing of the Michigan Air National Guard along with two C-146A Wolfhounds from the Air Force Special Operations Command participated in the exercise. The aircraft landed on state highway M-32 as part of Northern Strike 21, a large-scale training exercise, in Alpena, Michigan. This was the first time that United States military aircraft had used highways as airstrips on American soil. The United States Air Force repeated this training with the Rally in Rockies exercise from the 12 to 17 September.

== Gallery ==
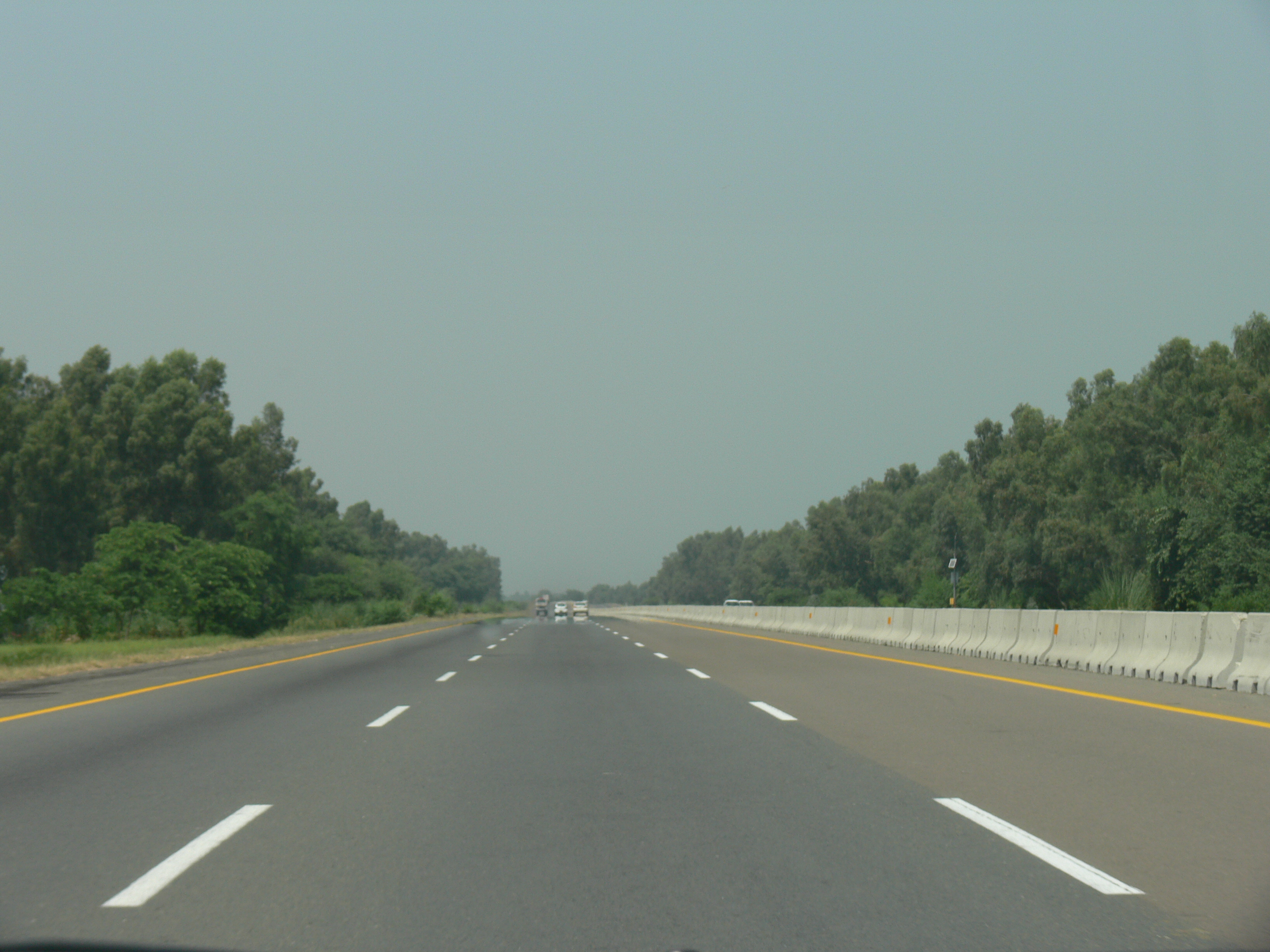
Road runway section on Pakistan's M-2 Motorway with removable medians.

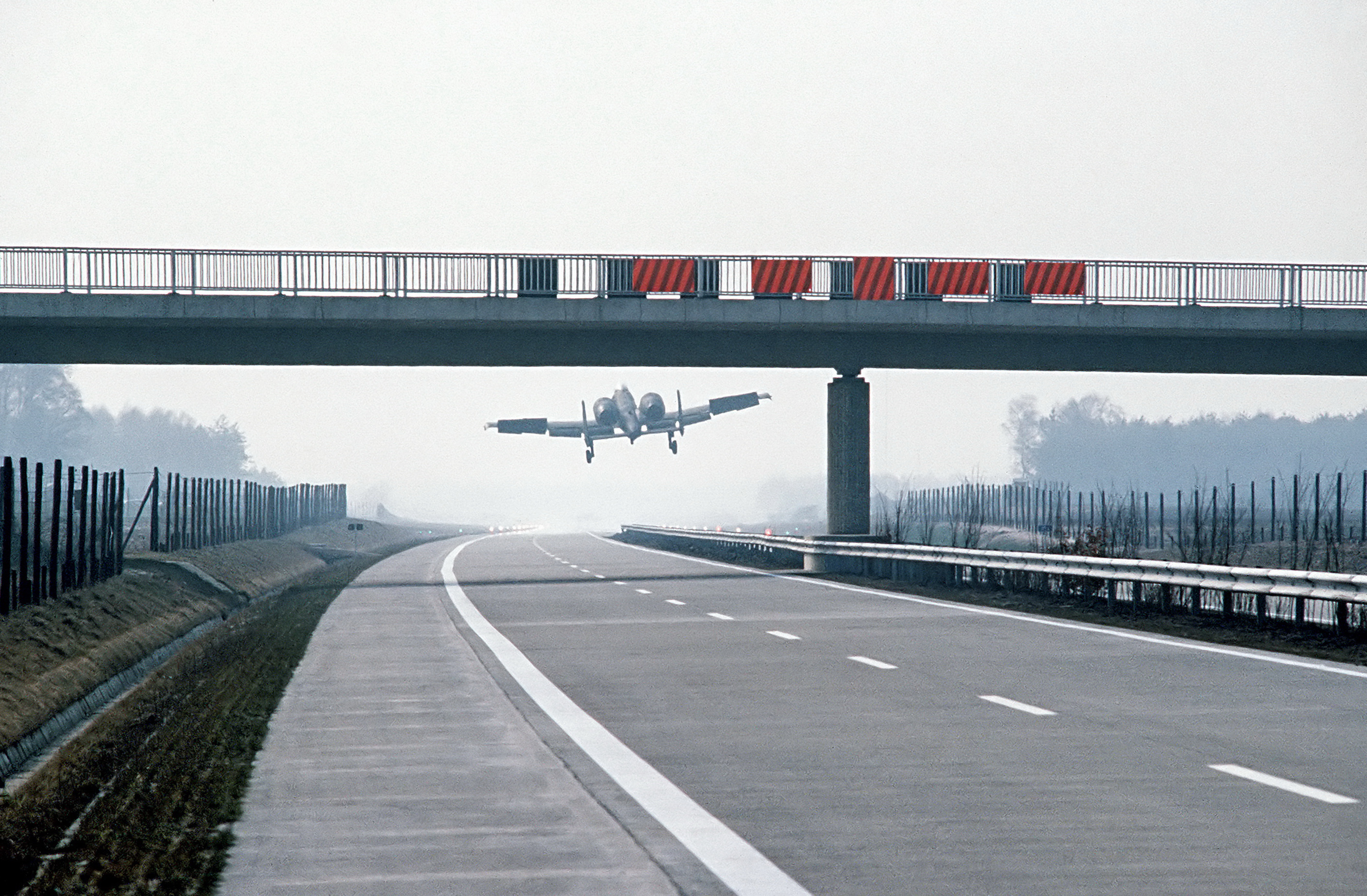
An A-10 Thunderbolt II aircraft lands on the autobahn A29 near city of Ahlhorn during NATO-exercise "Highway 84".

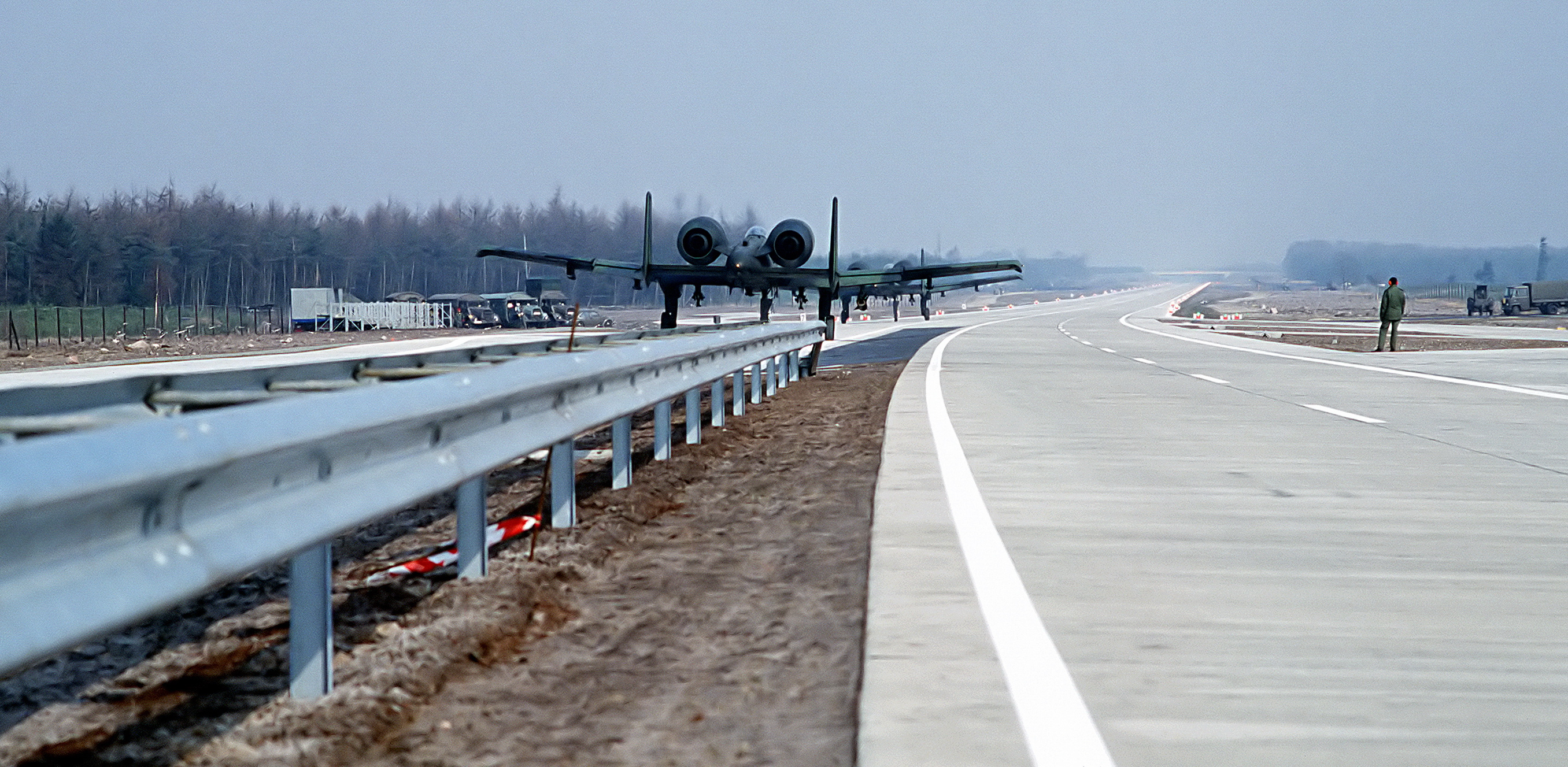
Rear view of an A-10 Thunderbolt II aircraft as it takes off from the autobahn A29 near city of Ahlhorn during NATO-exercise "Highway 84".

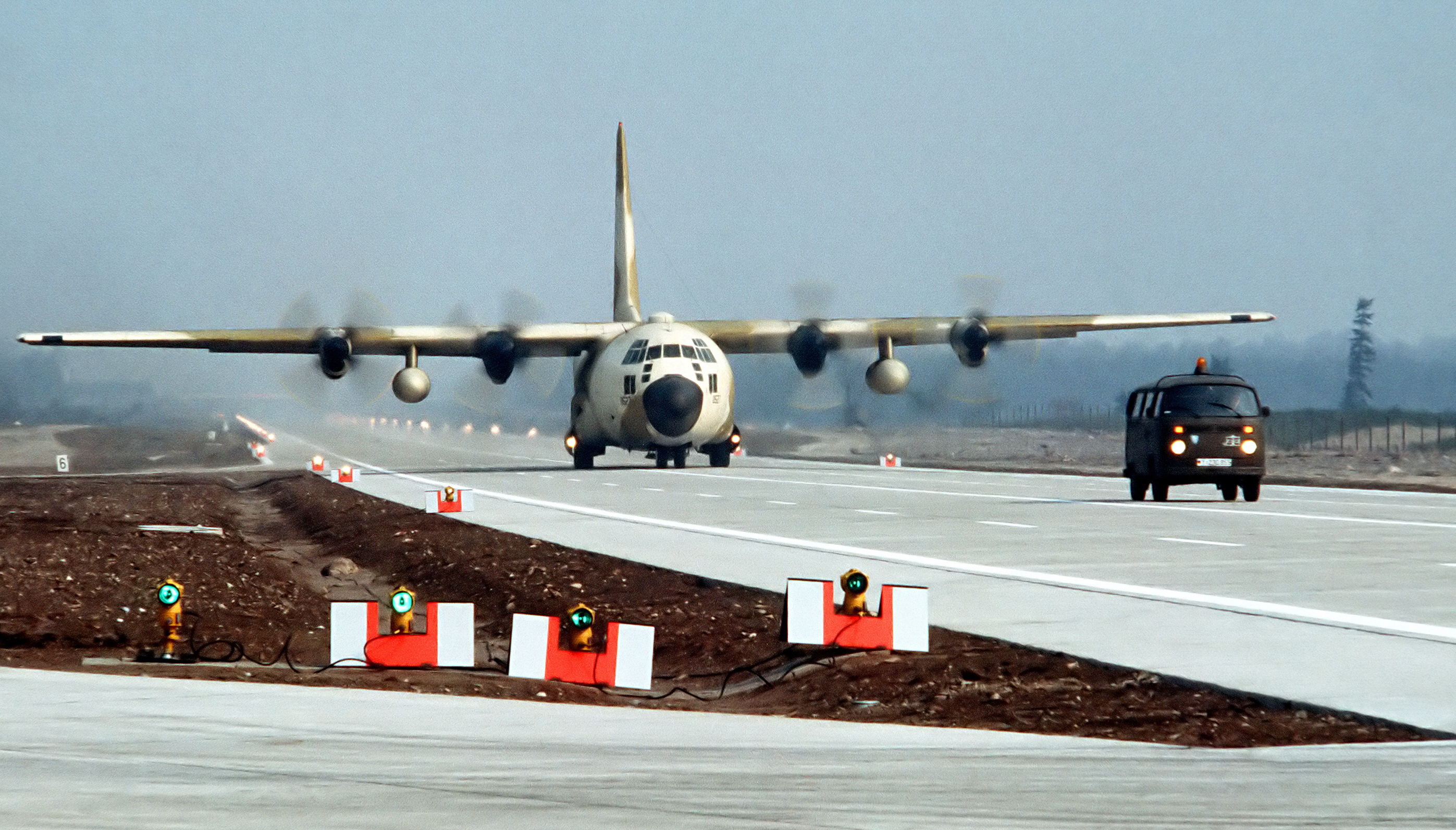
Lockheed C-130 Hercules aircraft on taxidrive on the autobahn A29 near city of Ahlhorn during NATO-exercise "Highway 84".

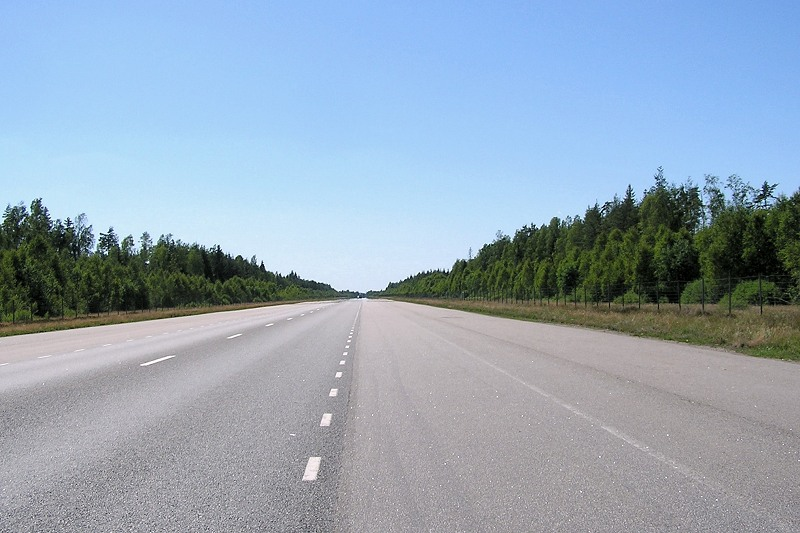
Former road runway near Eneryda, Sweden.

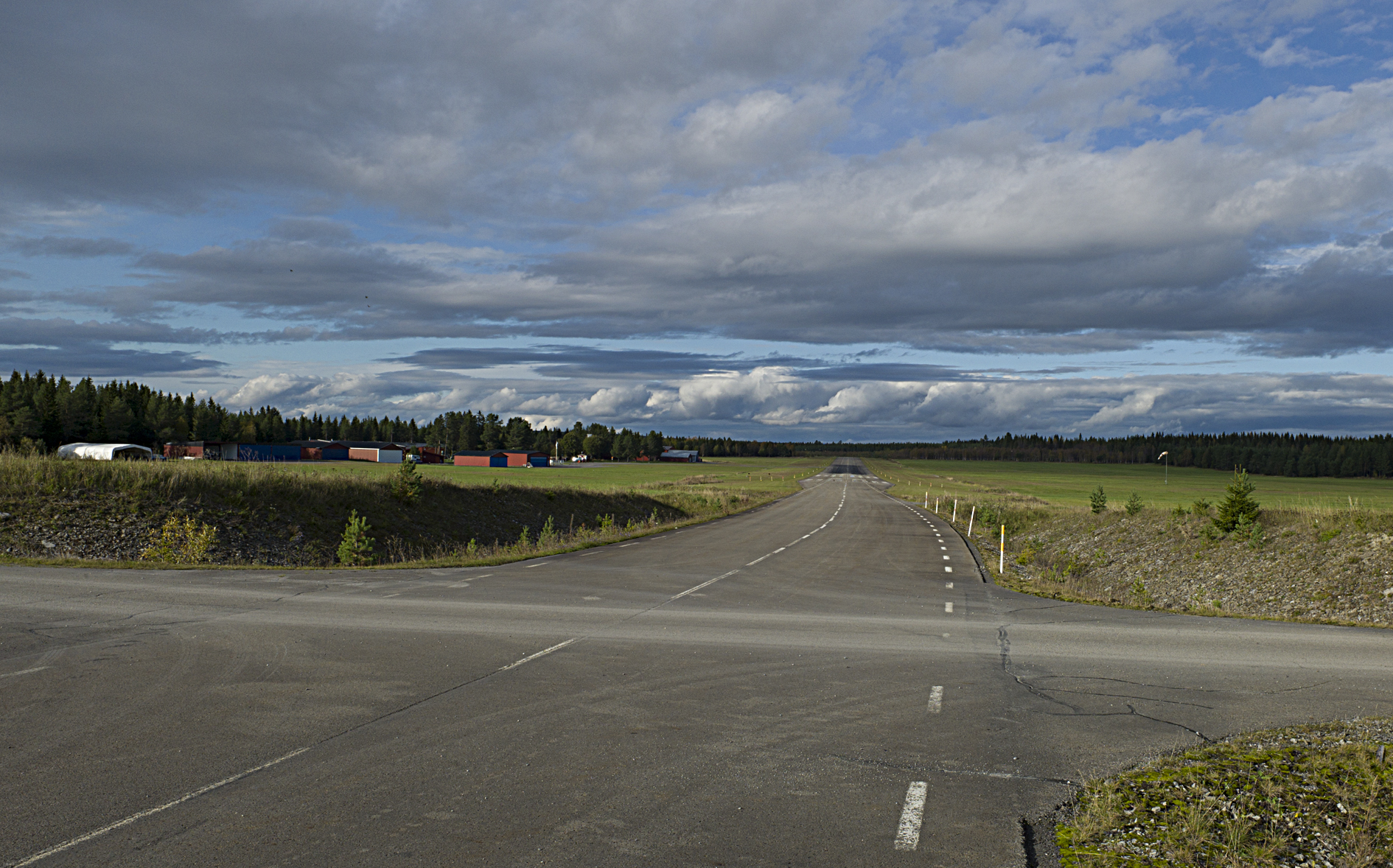
Kortbana (short runway) at former Optand wartime air base, Sweden. Notice the road becoming wider.

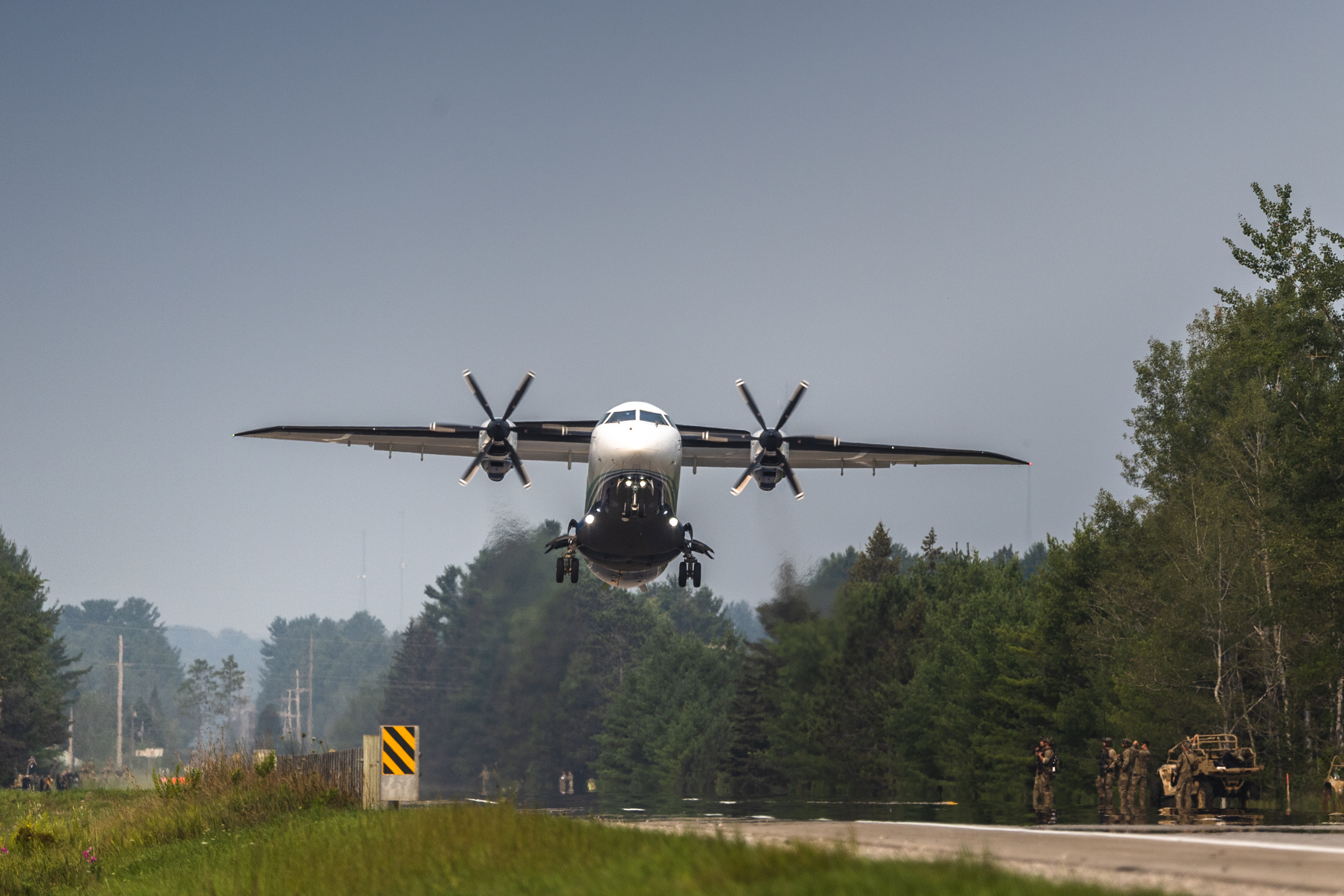
C-146A Wolfhound from Hurlburt Field, Florida, takes off on a public highway in Alpena, Michigan, 5 August 2021

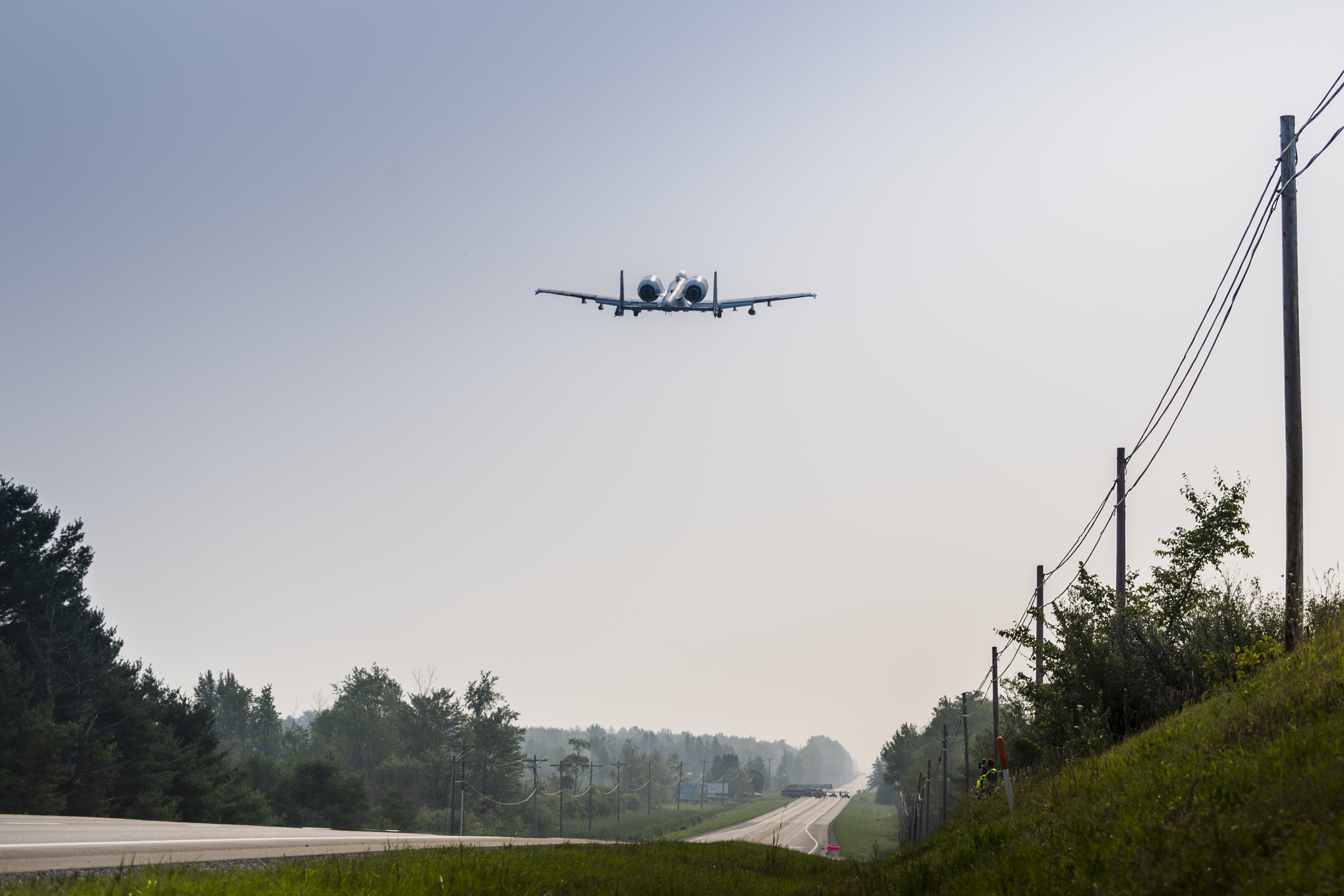
An A-10 Thunderbolt II from Selfridge Air National Guard Base, Michigan, prepares to land on a public highway in Alpena, Michigan, 5 August 2021

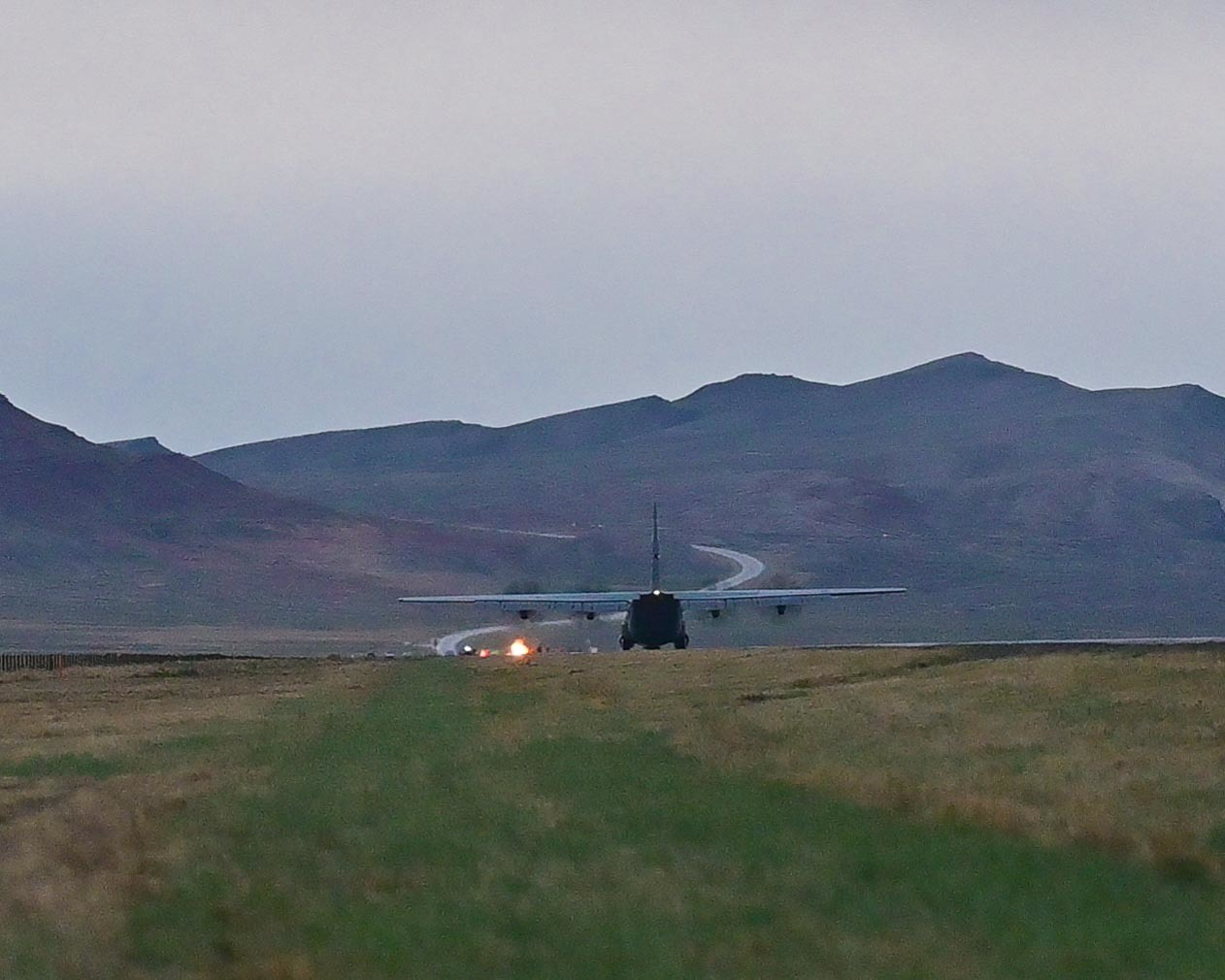
Air Force Reserve Command demonstrates strategic depth of combat airlift on Wyoming highway during training exercise,

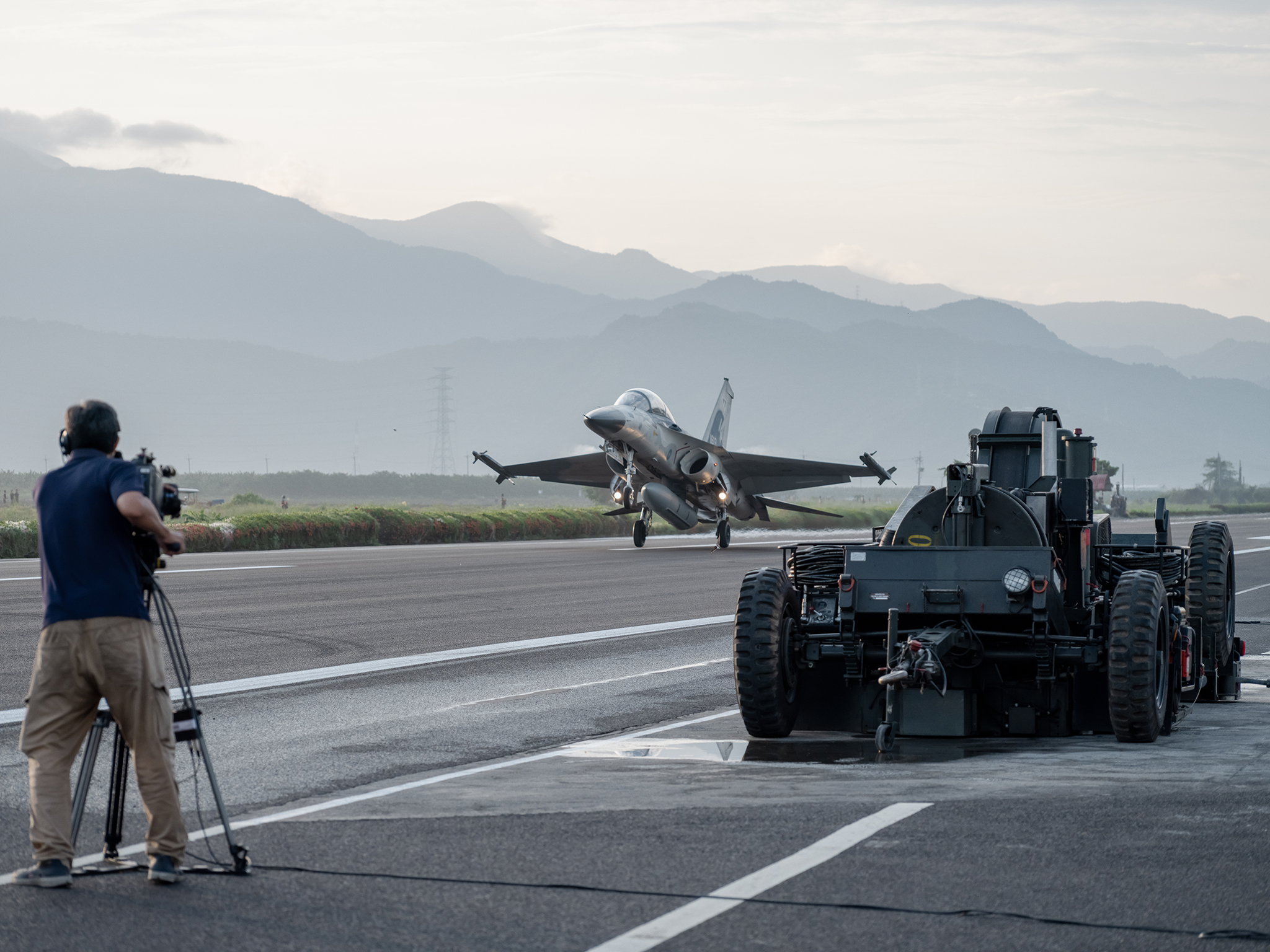
AIDC F-CK-1 Ching-kuo departing from a highway runway in Pingtung County during the 2021 Han Kuang exercise

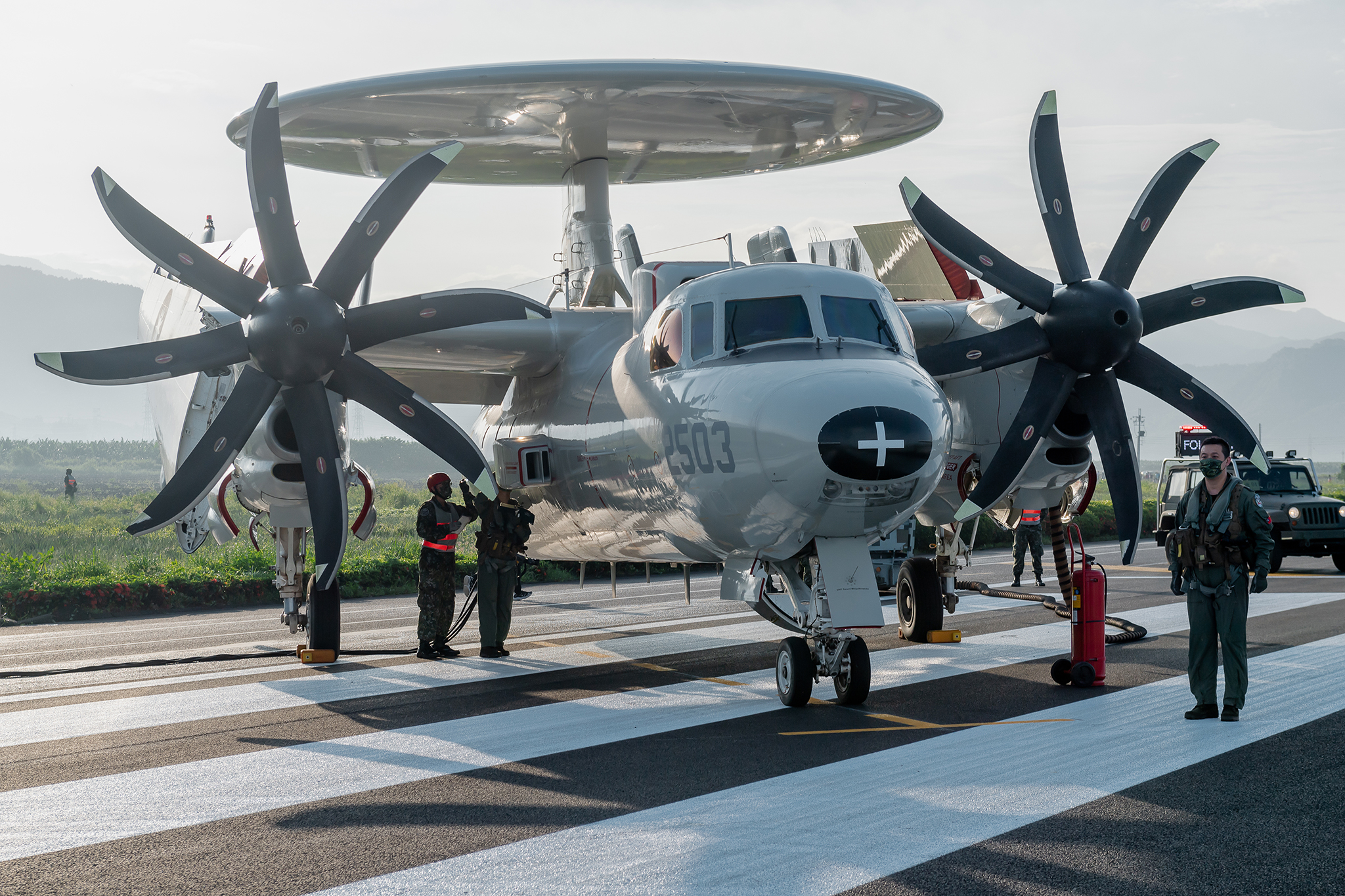
Grumman E-2 Hawkeye on display at a highway strip during the 2021 Han Kuang exercise

== See also ==
- Index of aviation articles
- Satellite airfield
- Underground hangar
