= List of airports in Cyprus =

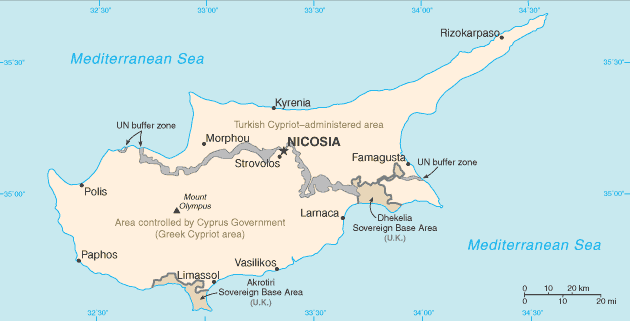
Map of Cyprus

This is a list of airports in Cyprus, grouped by type and sorted by location.

== Airports ==
Airport name	Location	Jurisdiction	ICAO	IATA	Type	Passengers	Note
Larnaca International Airport	Larnaca	ROC	LCLK	LCA	Public	7,734,290 (2017)	
Paphos International Airport	Paphos	ROC	LCPH	PFO	Public and Military	2,518,169 (2017)	
Nicosia International Airport	Nicosia	UNBZ	LCNC	NIC	Public		Not used
Lakatamia Air Force Base	Lakatamia	ROC			Military		
Ercan International Airport	Tymbou	TRNC	LCEN	ECN	Public	3,962,541 (2017)	
Geçitkale Air Base	Lefkoniko	TRNC	LCGK	GEC	Military		
İlker Karter Air Base	Kyrenia	TRNC			Military		35°16′34″N 33°16′04″E
RAF Akrotiri	Akrotiri	SBA	LCRA	AKT	Military		
Kingsfield Airfield	Dhekelia	SBA	LCRE	KIN	Military		06/24 35°00′55″N 33°43′02″E; Previously RAF Kingsfield.

Cyprus also has three Road runways.

== See also ==
- Transport in Cyprus
- Cyprus dispute
- List of airports by ICAO code: L#LC – Cyprus
- List of the busiest airports in the Middle East
