= A2 motorway (Cyprus) =

A2 Motorway
- Nicosia – Larnaca
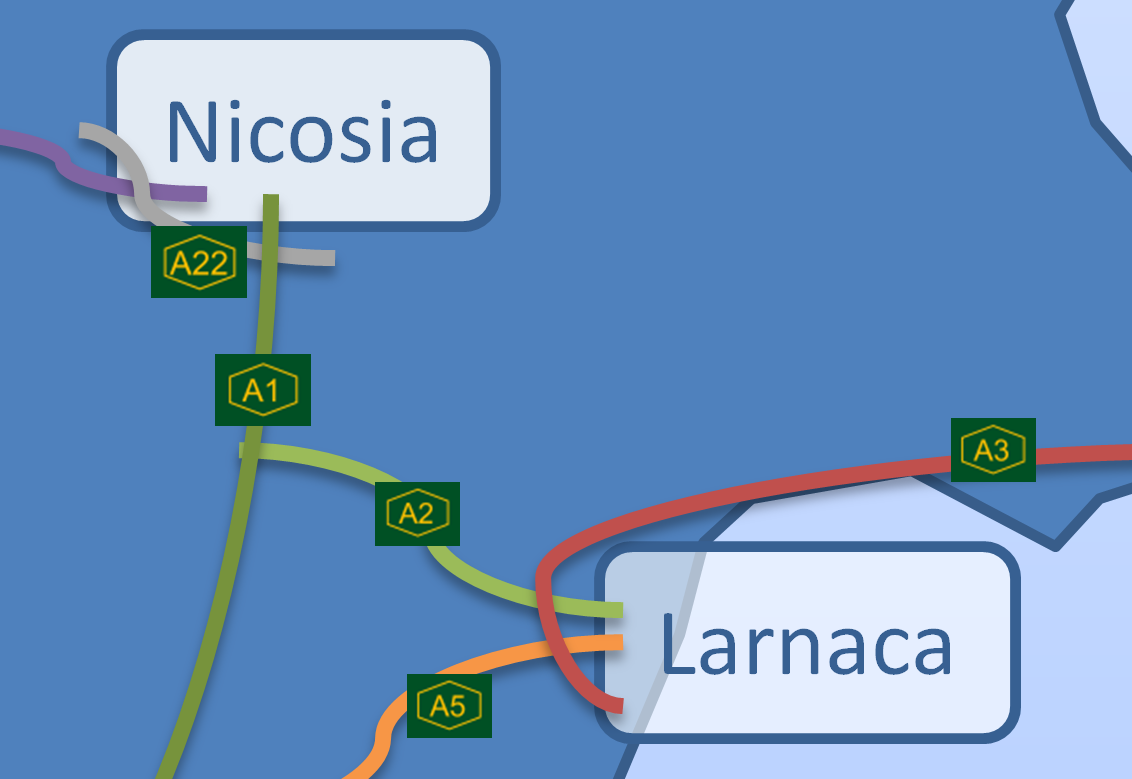
- A2 Motorway diagram

Route information
- Length: 21 km (13 mi)

Major junctions
- From: Alampra Intersection
- To: Rizoelia Junction (Larnaca)

Location
- Country: Cyprus
- Regions: Nicosia District, Larnaca District
- Major cities: Larnaca

Highway system
- Motorways and roads in Cyprus
← A1	→ A3

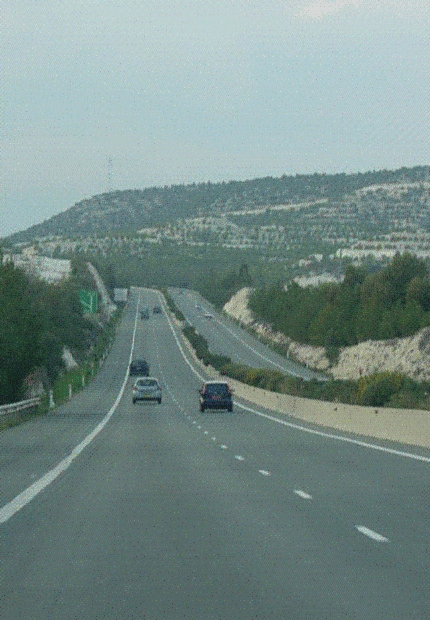
A2 motorway in Cyprus

The A2 (Nicosia–Larnaca motorway) in Cyprus is a road which branches off the A1 at Pera Chorio and connects to the A3 near Aradippou.

== Junctions ==
Number	Area	Connections
1	Pera Chorio	A1 highway logo
2	Pera Chorio	B1 highway logo
3	Lympia	F200
4	Lympia	B2 highway logo
5	Kochi	B2 highway logo
6	Aradippou	A3 highway logo B2 highway logo

== Notable details ==
- Junction 6 (Rizoella Junction) is a flyover roundabout
- Access to the A1 from junction 1 is northbound only

== See also ==
- Roads and motorways in Cyprus
