= Moni, Cyprus =

Moni Μονή
- Village
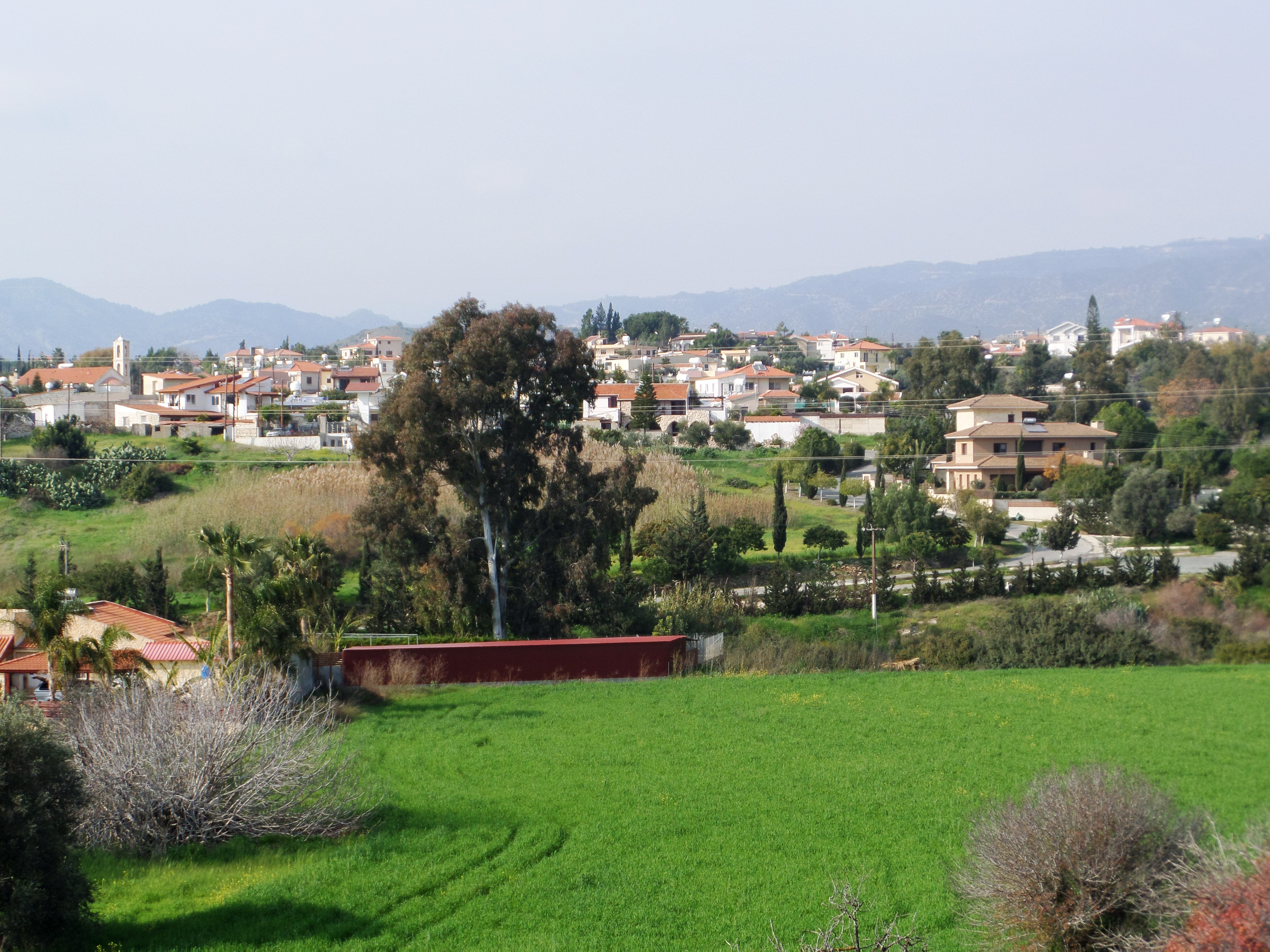

- Location in Cyprus
- Coordinates: 34°44′18″N 33°12′4″E
- Country: Cyprus
- District: Limassol District

Population (2001)
  - Total: 391
- Time zone: UTC+2 (EET)
  - Summer (DST): UTC+3 (EEST)

Moni (Greek: Μονή) is a village in the Limassol District of Cyprus, located 2 km east of Pyrgos.
