= Yakumo Sub Base =

Japanese military airbase

Coordinates: 42°14′46″N 140°15′55″E

Yakumo Sub Base (八雲分屯基地, yakumobuntonkichi) is a military air base located in Yakumo, Futami District, Hokkaido, Japan.
