= A5 motorway (Cyprus) =

A5 Motorway
- Kofinou – Larnaca

Route information
- Length: 19 km (12 mi)

Major junctions
- From: Kofinou Interchange
- To: Kalo Chorio Junction

Location
- Country: Cyprus
- Regions: Larnaca District

Highway system
- Motorways and roads in Cyprus
← A3	→ A6

The A5 links the A1 motorway (at Kofinou) with the A3 near Larnaca. It serves as the main route linking the cities of Limassol (with the largest port) and Larnaca (with the largest airport). It runs parallel to the older B5.
