= A1 motorway (Cyprus) =

Motorway from Nicosia to Limassol

A1 Motorway
- Nicosia – Limassol
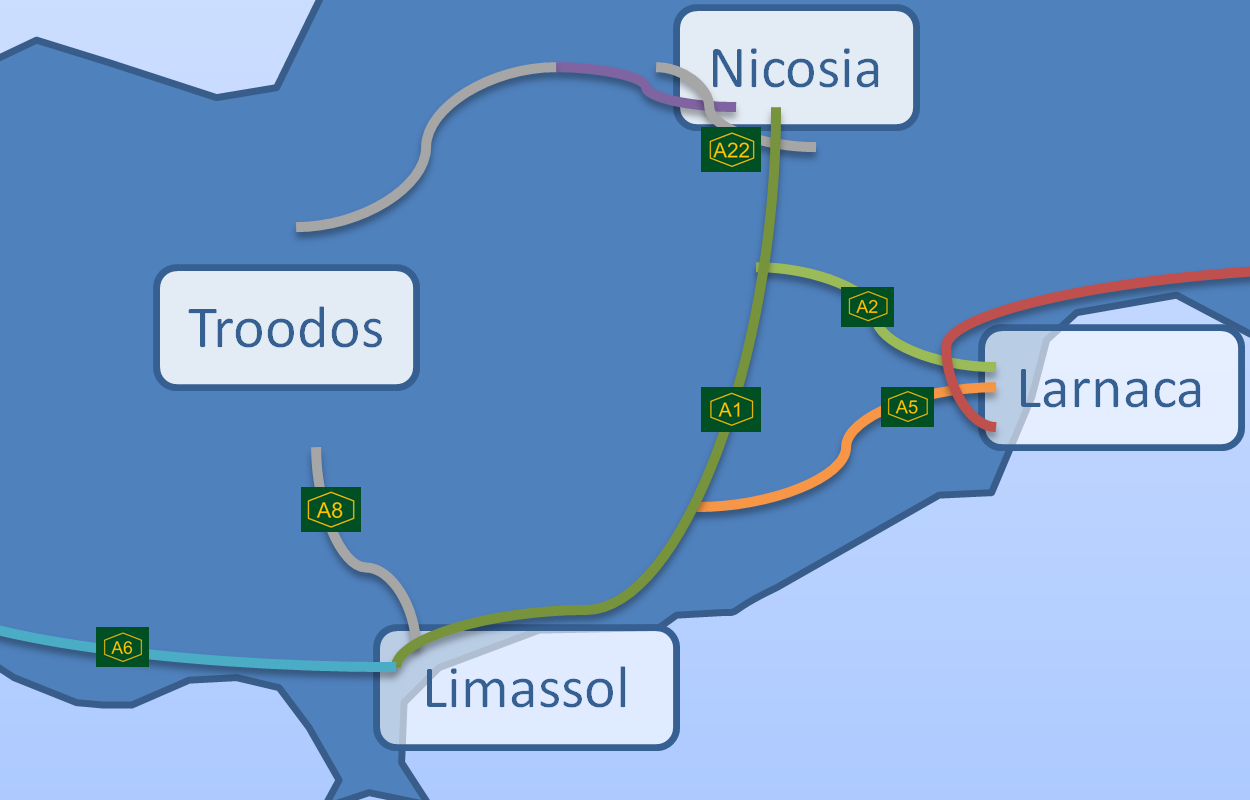
- A1 Motorway diagram

Route information
- Length: 73 km (45 mi)

Major junctions
- From: Kalispera traffic lights, Strovolos
- Pera Chorio towards Aradippou; Skarinou junction to Larnaca
- To: Polemidia and Troödos Junction, Limassol

Location
- Country: Cyprus
- Regions: Nicosia District, Larnaca District, Limassol District
- Major cities: Nicosia, Limassol

Highway system
- Motorways and roads in Cyprus
← A22	→ A2

The A1 motorway, locally referred to as the Nicosia–Limassol highway, is the first and longest motorway in Cyprus. It marked the beginning of an ambitious project to link the main cities of Cyprus with a modern four-lane motorway. The A1 is 73 kilometres (45 miles) long, and is free of any at-grade intersections. It links the capital Nicosia, the administrative and financial hub, with Limassol, the second largest city and largest port on the island.

== Major Junctions ==
No.	Region	Main Road Connections	Other Connections
1	Strovolos	B1 highway logo	E101 , Stavrou
2	Strovolos	B22 highway logo	n/a
3	Latsia	n/a	Phillipou Papakyprianou
4	Latsia	n/a	Archiepiskopou Kyprianou
5	Latsia	n/a	Megalou Alexandrou
6	Agios Konstantinos	A22 highway logo B1 highway logo	n/a
7	Daytona Raceway	n/a	E120 , Lefkosias
8	Nisou	B1 highway logo	E102
9	Pera Chorio	A2 highway logo	E103
10	Mosfiloti	n/a	E104
11	Kornos	n/a	E143
12	Kofinou	A5 highway logo B1 highway logo	n/a
13	Skarinou	n/a	E143
14	Choirokoita	B1 highway logo	n/a
15	Zygi	B1 highway logo	E106 , E107
16	Mari	B1 highway logo	E107
17	Governor's Beach	B1 highway logo	n/a
18	Pentakomo	B1 highway logo	F119
19	Moni	B1 highway logo	n/a
20	Parekklisia	n/a	E109
21	Agios Tychonas	n/a	Georgiou Griva Digeni , Orinsilou
22	Agios Tychonas	n/a	F127 , Ariadnis
23	Germasogeia	n/a	F128 , Spyrou Kyprianou
24	Agios Athanasios	n/a	Ayiou Athanasiou
25	Mesa Geitonia	n/a	F131 , Archiepiskopou Makariou III , Kartesiou
26	Kapsalos	n/a	E110
27	Mesa Geitonia	n/a	Dominitas Lanitis Avenue
28	Mesa Geitonia	n/a	Vasileios Kostantinou
29	Kapsalos	/	n/a
30	Kato Polemidia	n/a	Omonias , Theodorou Potamianou , Kyrillou Loukareos
31	Panagia Evangelistria	n/a	Nikaias

== History ==
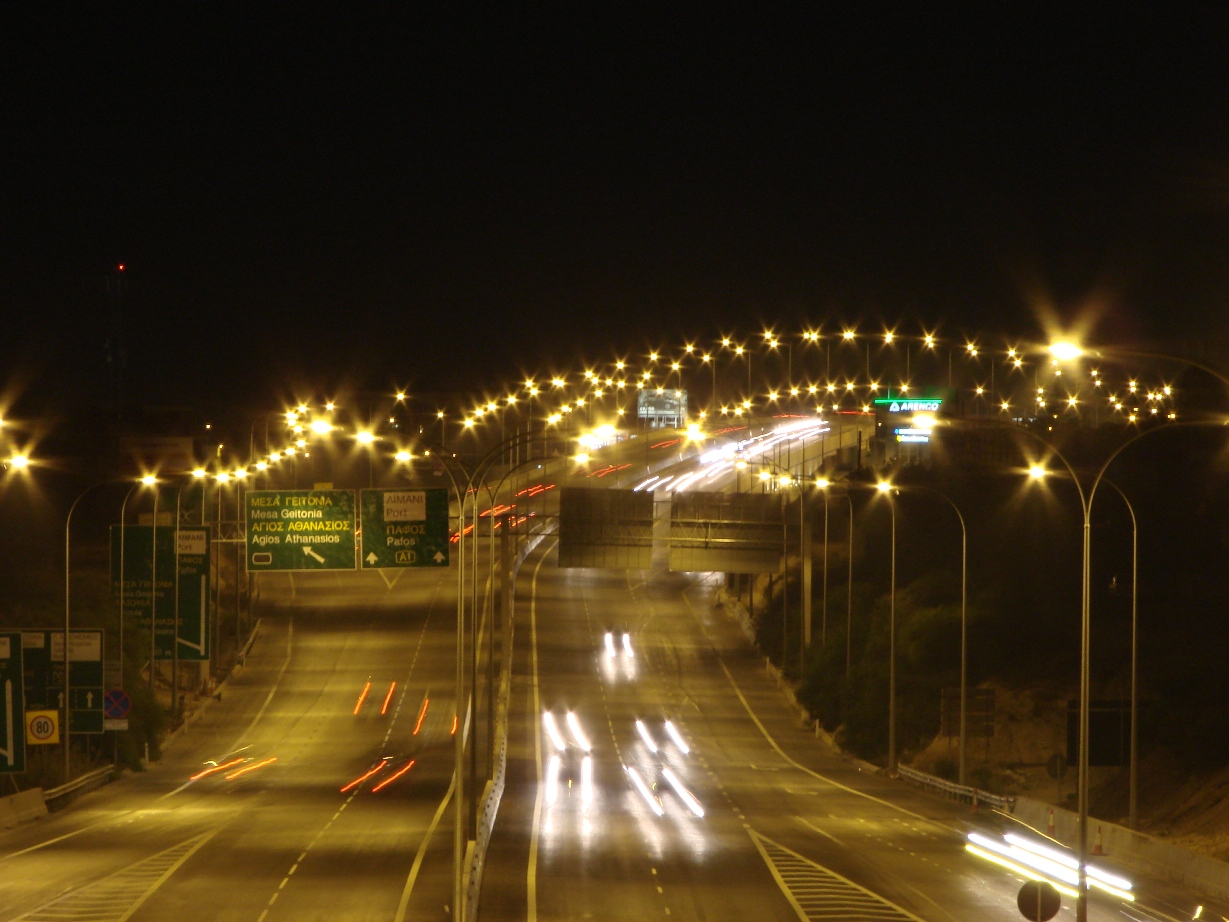
Night view between Agios Athanasios junction and Linopetra junction in Limassol.

Construction started on the A1 to connect Nicosia with the new main port of Cyprus at Limassol in 1978. Construction started at both ends concurrently. Initially many junctions were at-grade. Although reconstruction at the Nicosia end has obliterated any evidence of this, old filter lanes remain at junction 17.

The motorway was opened in stages, with the final stage (Kornos to Kophinou) completed in October 1984, while upgrades within Limassol were completed in summer 2008. These upgrades included the Polemidia and Troödos junction, Agia Filaxis Junction, Agios Athanasios junction, Linopetra junction, and Germasogeia junction, and involved the creation of many flyovers to remove all at-grade intersections.

Beginning in 2012, the section of motorway between the entrance of Nicosia and the intersection with the A2 was upgraded to six lanes.

== See also ==
- Roads and motorways in Cyprus
