= A3 motorway (Cyprus) =

A3 Motorway
- Larnaca - Agia Napa
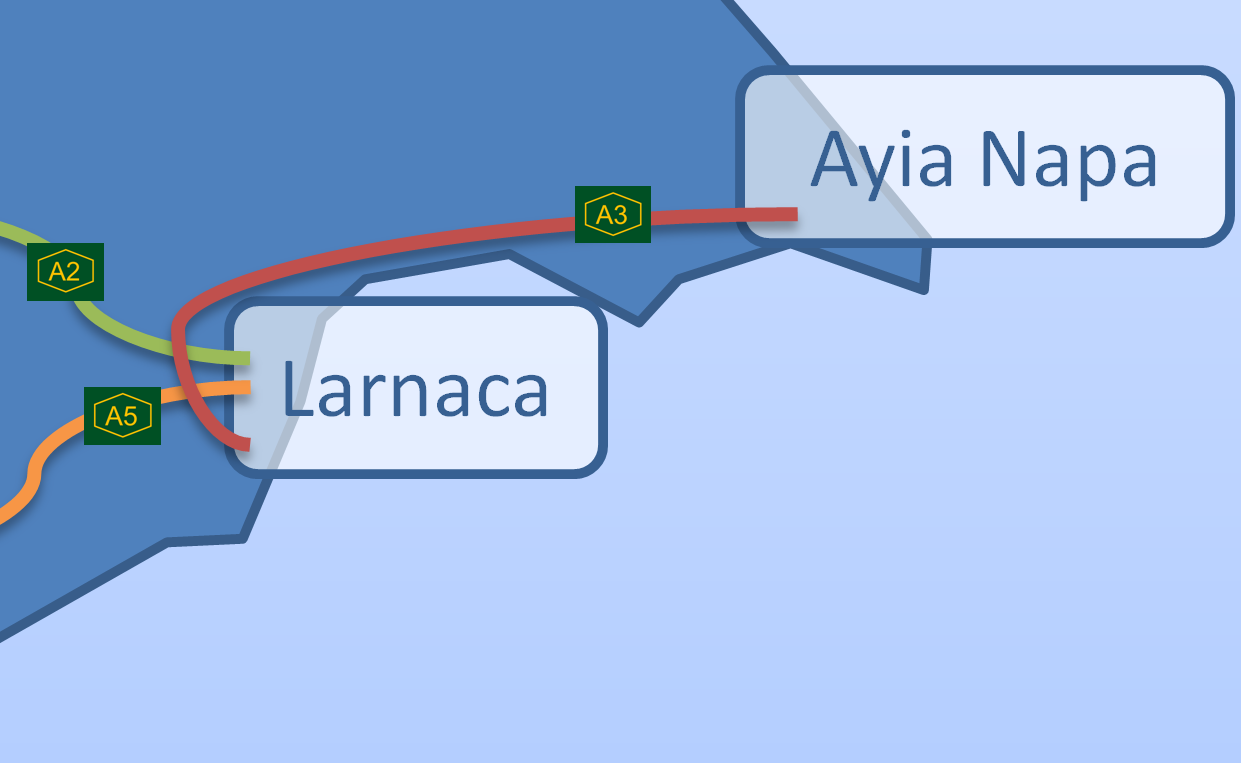
- A3 highway diagram

Route information
- Length: 55 km (34 mi)

Major junctions
- Beltway around Larnaca
- From: Larnaca International Airport junction
- Larnaca International Airport Junction to Larnaca Center and Kiti Kalo Chorio Junction to Central Larnaca and Limassol Rizoelia Junction to Central Larnaca and Nicosia
- To: Ayia Napa Main Roundabout

Location
- Country: Cyprus
- Regions: Larnaca District; Famagusta District

Highway system
- Motorways and roads in Cyprus
← A2	→ A5

The A3 is a motorway in Cyprus which connects Larnaca International Airport (the state's largest airport) with Ayia Napa, a tourist destination, and serves as a beltway for the city of Larnaca. It was built in three stages: the first section, from Rizoelia Junction to Dhekelia, opening in 1992; the second from Rizoelia Junction to Dromolaxia, opening in 1993; and the third from Dhekelia to Ayia Napa, which opened in 2003. Until phase 3 of construction was completed, the motorway used to culminate in an acute bend near Dhekelia, which was a frequent site of road accidents.

The motorway's western terminus was altered in 2009 to facilitate direct access to a new terminal at Larnaca International Airport.

== Major Junctions ==
No.	Region	Main Road Connections	Other (Named) Connections
1	Larnaca International	–	Airport Loop
2	Dromolaxia	B4 highway logo	–
3	Dromolaxia	–	E316
4	Kalo Chorio	A5 highway logo B5 highway logo	E104
5	Aradippou	–	E323
6	Aradippou	–	Ioanni Makrygianni
7	Aradippou	A2 highway logo B2 highway logo	–
8	Apostolos Loukas	–	E322
9	Livadia	–	E301 (Andrea Stylianou); Makariou
10	Oroklini	–	Archebiskopu Makariou III
11	Pyla	–	Mesaorias; Archepiskopu Makariou III Avenue
12	Pyla	–	Griva Digeni Avenue
13	Xylotymvou	–	E303
14	Ormidia	–	Andrea Karkavitsa
15	Ormidia	B3 highway logo	Larnakos
16	Xylofagou	–	25th March Avenue
17	Xylofagou	–	Michalaki Vrachiki
18	Liopetri	–	E300; E309
19	Agia Thekla	–	E340
20	Agia Napa	–	E326; Agias Varvaras
21	Agia Napa	–	E306; E327
