= Pera Chorio =

Pera Chorio: Πέρα Χωριό (Greek); Perahoryo (Turkish)
- Location in Cyprus
- Coordinates: 35°0′42″N 33°23′25″E
- Country: Cyprus
- District: Nicosia District

Population (2001)
  - Total: 2,236
- Time zone: UTC+2 (EET)
  - Summer (DST): UTC+3 (EEST)
- Website: http://www.perachorio-nissou.org.cy/en/page/home

Pera Chorio (Greek: Πέρα Χωριό; Turkish: Perahoryo) is a large village in Cyprus, located near the town of Dali. The population of the village is around 2,200 people, many of whom are refugees who went to the village after the 1974 Turkish invasion. The River Gualias, the second biggest river in Cyprus, separates the village from Nisou. There are many shops, supermarkets, kiosks, bakeries, and communication buildings. Most of the population are middle-aged farmers and cattle-breeders. In winter the temperature is around 10 °C to 25 °C and at the summer is 35 °C and above.

Following local government reform in 2024, Pera Chorio was merged into the new municipality of South Nicosia-Idalion.
