= List of Cypriot football transfers summer 2013 =

This is a list of Cypriot football transfers for the 2013–14 summer transfer window by club. Only transfers of clubs in the Cypriot First Division and Cypriot Second Division are included.

The summer transfer window opened on 1 June 2013, although a few transfers took place prior to that date. The window closed at midnight on 31 August 2013. Players without a club may join one at any time, either during or in between transfer windows.

== Cypriot First Division ==
=== AEK Kouklia ===
In: Note: Flags indicate national team as defined under FIFA eligibility rules; some limited exceptions apply. Players may hold more than one non-FIFA nationality.

| No. | Pos. | Nation | Player |
|---|---|---|---|
| — | DF | CYP | Michalis Ioannou (from AEP Paphos U21) |
| 8 | DF | CYP | Ioannis Savva (from AEP Paphos) |
| 28 | MF | CYP | Ioannis Varnavidis (from AEP Paphos) |
| 27 | DF | CYP | Charalambos Charalambous (from Akritas Chlorakas) |
| 17 | GK | CYP | Charalambos Kairinos (from Aris Limassol) |
| 21 | MF | CYP | Angelos Efthymiou (from AEP Paphos) |
| 2 | DF | CYP | Christos Petrou (from Akritas Chlorakas) |
| 20 | FW | CYP | Onisiforos Pachtalias (from Akritas Chlorakas) |
| 30 | DF | ARG | Mauricio Mazzetti (from (Bolivia) Club Universitario) |
| 22 | MF | ARG | Nelson González (from (Uruguay) Bella Vista) |
| 5 | MF | ARG | Nicolás de Bruno (from (Argentina) Central Córdoba) |
| 11 | FW | ARG | Pablo Vranjicán (from (Argentina) UAC Zavalla) |
| 9 | FW | ENG | Hakeem Araba (from (England) Lowestoft Town) |
| 10 | MF | AUS | Robert Stambolziev (from Olympiakos Nicosia) |
| 31 | FW | URU | Diego Silva (from (Uruguay) Central Español) |
| 18 | DF | ARG | Franco Bano (from (Uruguay) Atenas) |
| 34 | MF | URU | Michel Acosta (from (Uruguay) Atenas) |
| — | MF | BRA | Bruno Agnello (from (Portugal) U.D. Oliveirense) |
| 26 | DF | CYP | Alexandros Demetriou (from Aris Limassol) |
| — | MF | CYP | Giorgos Sielis (from AEP Paphos) |
| 14 | FW | POR | Wesllem (from Anagennisi Dherynia) |
| 19 | MF | CYP | Alexandros Garpozis (from Ermis Aradippou) |
| 39 | FW | ARG | Nicolás Gianni (from (Argentina) Crucero del Norte) |

Out: Note: Flags indicate national team as defined under FIFA eligibility rules; some limited exceptions apply. Players may hold more than one non-FIFA nationality.

| No. | Pos. | Nation | Player |
|---|---|---|---|
| 93 | MF | CYP | Martinos Christofi (loan return to AEL Limassol) |
| 80 | MF | CYP | Liasos Louka (to Karmiottissa Pano Polemidia) |
| 2 | MF | BEL | Fangio Buyse (retired) |
| 5 | DF | POR | Nuno Gomes (released) |
| 3 | DF | CYP | Marios Papademetriou (released) |
| 19 | GK | CYP | Andrianos Skaros (released) |
| 26 | GK | CYP | Andreas Mavrommatis (released) |
| 22 | DF | CYP | Andreas Andreou (to Foinikas Agias Marinas Chrysochous) |
| 58 | DF | CYP | Giorgos Vasou (to Akritas Chlorakas) |
| 20 | MF | CYP | Pavlos Zerpeteas (to Akritas Chlorakas) |
| 23 | DF | CYP | Giorgos Tofaridis (to Akritas Chlorakas) |
| 8 | MF | BRA | Paulinho Carioca (released) |
| 9 | FW | CYP | Stamatis Pantos (to Nea Salamina) |
| 40 | FW | POR | Ângelo (to Othellos Athienou) |
| 10 | MF | CYP | Marios Louka (to Ayia Napa) |
| — | MF | BRA | Bruno Agnello (released) |
| 6 | MF | CYP | Demos Sokratous (to AEZ Zakakiou) |
| — | DF | CYP | Michalis Ioannou (to Foinikas Agias Marinas Chrysochous) |
| 2 | DF | CYP | Christos Petrou (released) |

=== AEK Larnaca ===
In: Note: Flags indicate national team as defined under FIFA eligibility rules; some limited exceptions apply. Players may hold more than one non-FIFA nationality.

| No. | Pos. | Nation | Player |
|---|---|---|---|
| 1 | GK | BRA | Alexandre Negri (loan return from Doxa Katokopias) |
| 8 | MF | NED | Tom Daemen (loan return from Enosis Neon Paralimni) |
| 17 | MF | CAN | Issey Nakajima-Farran (loan return from Alki Larnaca) |
| 7 | MF | POR | Hélder Castro (from Olympiakos Nicosia) |
| 8 | MF | ARG | Adrián Lucero (from (Greece) Panthrakikos) |
| 22 | DF | POR | Toni (from Apollon Limassol) |
| 4 | MF | GRE | Stelios Marangos (from (Greece) Kavala) |
| 20 | MF | GRE | Giannis Skopelitis (from Anorthosis Famagusta) |
| 17 | MF | GRE | Ilias Mihalopoulos (from (Greece) Panthrakikos) |
| 3 | DF | ISR | Haim Megrelishvili (from (Israel) Beitar Jerusalem) |
| 14 | FW | UKR | Vitaliy Ivanko (from (Ukraine) Metalurh Donetsk) |
| 21 | DF | CYP | Nikos Englezou (from (Greece) AEK Athens) |
| 25 | MF | ARG | Vicente Monje (from (Turkey) Orduspor) |
| 15 | GK | LTU | Emilijus Zubas (on loan from (Latvia) FK Daugava) |
| 29 | DF | GRE | Giorgos Zigogiannis (from (Greece) Panionios) |
| 9 | FW | COL | Harold Reina (on loan from (Colombia) Deportivo Cali) |

Out: Note: Flags indicate national team as defined under FIFA eligibility rules; some limited exceptions apply. Players may hold more than one non-FIFA nationality.

| No. | Pos. | Nation | Player |
|---|---|---|---|
| 1 | GK | ESP | Pulpo Romero (loan return to Doxa Katokopias) |
| 55 | GK | ISR | Guy Haimov (loan return to (Israel) Maccabi Tel Aviv) |
| 37 | DF | NED | Serginho Greene (loan return to (Serbia) FK Vojvodina) |
| 14 | MF | CYP | Christos Marangos (to Anorthosis Famagusta) |
| 4 | MF | BRA | Alex da Silva (to (Ukraine) Metalurh Donetsk) |
| 7 | MF | NED | Edwin Linssen (to (Netherlands) De Graafschap) |
| 19 | DF | NED | Tim de Cler (retired) |
| 22 | DF | FRA | Kenny Gillet (released) |
| 25 | MF | CRO | Antun Palić (released) |
| 9 | FW | ESP | Chando (to (Spain) Girona) |
| 3 | DF | ESP | Albert Serrán (to (Spain) Alcorcón) |
| 88 | MF | BRA | Mércio (to (Portugal) Famalicão) |
| 20 | DF | CYP | Jason Demetriou (to Anorthosis Famagusta) |
| 15 | DF | CYP | Constantinos Kastanas (on loan to Alki Larnaca) |
| 26 | MF | CYP | Demetris Kyprianou (on loan to Alki Larnaca) |
| 40 | GK | CYP | Zannetos Mytidis (on loan to Alki Larnaca) |
| 24 | MF | CYP | Demetris Kyriakou (on loan to Ethnikos Achna) |

=== AEL Limassol ===
In: Note: Flags indicate national team as defined under FIFA eligibility rules; some limited exceptions apply. Players may hold more than one non-FIFA nationality.

| No. | Pos. | Nation | Player |
|---|---|---|---|
| — | MF | CYP | Martinos Christofi (loan return from AEK Kouklia) |
| 30 | GK | ESP | Pulpo Romero (from Doxa Katokopias) |
| 86 | FW | POR | Tiago Targino (from (Portugal) Olhanense) |
| — | FW | CIV | Rodolph Amessan (from (Portugal) Académica de Coimbra) |
| 89 | FW | CYP | Kristis Andreou (from (Czech Republic) FC Slovácko) |
| 1 | GK | MAR | Karim Fegrouche (from (Greece) PAS Giannina) |
| 25 | DF | ANG | Miguel Quiame (from (Angola) Petro de Luanda) |
| 9 | FW | BRA | Cássio (from (South Korea) Gwangju) |
| 13 | DF | BRA | Diego Gaúcho (from (Portugal) Moreirense) |
| 28 | MF | POR | Edú (from (Portugal) FC Porto B) |
| 31 | FW | NED | Fouad Idabdelhay (from (Netherlands) Dordrecht) |

Out: Note: Flags indicate national team as defined under FIFA eligibility rules; some limited exceptions apply. Players may hold more than one non-FIFA nationality.

| No. | Pos. | Nation | Player |
|---|---|---|---|
| — | MF | CYP | Martinos Christofi (to Alki Larnaca) |
| 70 | MF | ANG | Gilberto (to (Angola) Petro de Luanda) |
| 13 | GK | CYP | Simos Tsiakkas (to Nikos & Sokratis Erimis) |
| 22 | GK | ALB | Isli Hidi (to Apollon Limassol) |
| 37 | DF | UKR | Maksym Ilchysh (to Aris Limassol) |
| 32 | GK | ARG | Matías Degra (to (Portugal) Paços de Ferreira) |
| 10 | MF | POR | Rui Miguel (to (Portugal) Paços de Ferreira) |
| 2 | DF | CYP | Dosa Júnior (to (Poland) Legia Warsaw) |
| 17 | MF | POR | Paulo Sérgio (to (Portugal) Arouca) |
| 19 | FW | CYP | Michalis Konstantinou (retired) |
| 99 | FW | CIV | Patrick Vouho (to (Georgia (country)) Dinamo Tbilisi) |
| 3 | DF | BRA | Maykon (released) |
| — | FW | CIV | Rodolph Amessan (on loan to Ethnikos Achna) |
| — | MF | CYP | David Neofytou (on loan to Nikos & Sokratis Erimis) |

=== Alki Larnaca ===
In: Note: Flags indicate national team as defined under FIFA eligibility rules; some limited exceptions apply. Players may hold more than one non-FIFA nationality.

| No. | Pos. | Nation | Player |
|---|---|---|---|
| — | MF | CYP | Antonis Katsis (loan return from Ayia Napa) |
| 93 | DF | CYP | Martinos Christofi (from AEL Limassol) |
| 8 | MF | CYP | Marios Charalambous (from Ermis Aradippou) |
| 25 | DF | CYP | Andreas Christofides (on loan from APOEL) |
| 11 | FW | CYP | Marios Demetriou (on loan from Omonia) |
| 22 | MF | CYP | Stavros Christoudias (on loan from Omonia) |
| 5 | DF | CYP | Pantelis Konomis (from PAEEK FC) |
| 23 | MF | CYP | Demetris Kyprianou (on loan from AEK Larnaca) |
| — | GK | GRE | Makis Giannikoglou (from Omonia) |
| 21 | MF | CYP | Emilios Panayiotou (on loan from APOEL) |
| 1 | GK | CYP | Zannetos Mytidis (on loan from AEK Larnaca) |
| 4 | DF | CYP | Constantinos Kastanas (on loan from AEK Larnaca) |
| 80 | MF | CYP | Fanos Katelaris (on loan from Omonia) |
| 37 | MF | CYP | Andreas Frantzeskou (on loan from Omonia) |
| 33 | DF | CYP | Constantinos Laifis (on loan from Anorthosis Famagusta) |
| 17 | DF | GHA | Moustapha Quaynor (free agent) |
| 9 | FW | ROU | Andrei Patranoiu (from (Romania) Atletic Bradu) |

Out: Note: Flags indicate national team as defined under FIFA eligibility rules; some limited exceptions apply. Players may hold more than one non-FIFA nationality.

| No. | Pos. | Nation | Player |
|---|---|---|---|
| 84 | MF | CAN | Issey Nakajima-Farran (loan return to AEK Larnaca) |
| — | MF | CYP | Antonis Katsis (to Ethnikos Achna) |
| 33 | GK | CYP | Antonis Georgallides (to (Greece) Platanias) |
| 81 | DF | SRB | Marjan Marković (released) |
| 60 | DF | GNB | Bruno Fernandes (released) |
| 30 | MF | BRA | Eduardo Pincelli (to (Brazil) Duque de Caxias) |
| 16 | MF | MKD | Nikola Gligorov (to (Azerbaijan) Khazar Lankaran) |
| 83 | GK | ENG | Corrin Brooks-Meade (to Omonia) |
| 10 | MF | ISR | Roei Beckel (to (Israel) F.C. Ashdod) |
| 20 | DF | ARG | Emiliano Fusco (to (Israel) Bnei Yehuda) |
| 4 | MF | POR | Barge (to (Portugal) Feirense) |
| 5 | DF | POR | Santamaria (to (Portugal) Pinhalnovense) |
| 7 | DF | BRA | James Dens (released) |
| 8 | MF | ESP | Jonathan Aspas (released) |
| 27 | FW | BRA | Sidnei (to (Australia) Perth Glory) |
| 89 | MF | ANG | Stélvio (to (Luxembourg) F91 Dudelange) |
| 9 | FW | POR | Bernardo Vasconcelos (to (Poland) Zawisza Bydgoszcz) |
| 17 | FW | CPV | Cafú (to (Portugal) Académico Viseu) |
| 55 | DF | ISR | Nisso Kapiloto (to (Israel) Beitar Jerusalem) |
| — | GK | GRE | Makis Giannikoglou (to (Greece) Kavala) |

=== Anorthosis Famagusta ===
In: Note: Flags indicate national team as defined under FIFA eligibility rules; some limited exceptions apply. Players may hold more than one non-FIFA nationality.

| No. | Pos. | Nation | Player |
|---|---|---|---|
| 32 | GK | CYP | Gavriel Constantinou (loan return from Chalkanoras Idaliou) |
| 18 | FW | CYP | Marcos Michael (loan return from Olympiakos Nicosia) |
| 38 | MF | CYP | Adamos Hadjigeorgiou (loan return from Anagennisi Dherynia) |
| 37 | DF | CYP | Nicos Efthimiou (loan return from Othellos Athienou) |
| 41 | MF | CYP | Zacharias Theodorou (loan return from Ayia Napa) |
| 1 | GK | MNE | Srđan Blažić (loan return from Nea Salamina) |
| 46 | MF | CYP | Andreas Makris (from AEP Paphos) |
| 39 | MF | GRE | Panagiotis Linardos (from AEZ Zakakiou) |
| 26 | FW | CIV | Gaossou Fofana (on loan from Doxa Katokopias) |
| 6 | MF | CYP | Christos Marangos (from AEK Larnaca) |
| 8 | MF | BRA | Marcinho (free agent) |
| 10 | MF | GEO | Shota Grigalashvili (from (Russia) SKA-Energiya Khabarovsk) |
| 4 | DF | MNE | Savo Pavićević (from (Israel) Hapoel Tel Aviv) |
| 11 | FW | ARG | Roberto Colautti (from (Israel) Maccabi Tel Aviv) |
| 20 | DF | CYP | Jason Demetriou (from AEK Larnaca) |
| 41 | MF | GRE | Grigoris Makos (from (Germany) TSV 1860 München) |
| 17 | FW | ISR | Amit Ben Shushan (from (Israel) Beitar Jerusalem) |
| 19 | MF | ESP | Gonzalo García (on loan from (Israel) Maccabi Tel Aviv) |
| 1 | GK | ARG | Mario Vega (free agent) |

Out: Note: Flags indicate national team as defined under FIFA eligibility rules; some limited exceptions apply. Players may hold more than one non-FIFA nationality.

| No. | Pos. | Nation | Player |
|---|---|---|---|
| 10 | MF | ISR | Barak Itzhaki (loan return to (Israel) Maccabi Tel Aviv) |
| 21 | MF | COL | Ricardo Laborde (to (Russia) FC Krasnodar) |
| 11 | FW | BRA | Evandro Roncatto (to (Bulgaria) Beroe Stara Zagora) |
| 4 | DF | NED | Jurgen Colin (to (Israel) Hapoel Tel Aviv) |
| 33 | MF | SVN | Branko Ilic (to (Israel) Hapoel Tel Aviv) |
| 20 | MF | CYP | Vincent Laban (to (Romania) Astra Giurgiu) |
| 80 | DF | POR | Rui Duarte (released) |
| 8 | MF | BRA | Juliano Spadacio (to (Israel) Hapoel Ironi Acre) |
| 1 | GK | MNE | Srđan Blažić (to Nea Salamina) |
| 19 | MF | GRE | Giannis Skopelitis (to AEK Larnaca) |
| 51 | GK | CYP | Constantinos Zacharoudiou (to Nikos & Sokratis Erimis) |
| 37 | DF | CYP | Nicos Efthimiou (on loan to Othellos Athienou) |
| 17 | FW | CZE | Jan Rezek (to (China) Changchun Yatai) |
| 31 | GK | CYP | Christos Mastrou (to Enosis Neon Paralimni) |
| 39 | MF | GRE | Panagiotis Linardos (to Anagennisi Dherynia) |
| 8 | MF | BRA | Marcinho (released) |
| 34 | DF | CYP | Constantinos Laifis (on loan to Alki Larnaca) |
| 38 | MF | CYP | Adamos Hadjigeorgiou (on loan to ASIL) |
| 18 | FW | CYP | Marcos Michael (on loan to Nikos & Sokratis Erimis) |

=== APOEL ===
In: Note: Flags indicate national team as defined under FIFA eligibility rules; some limited exceptions apply. Players may hold more than one non-FIFA nationality.

| No. | Pos. | Nation | Player |
|---|---|---|---|
| — | MF | CYP | Emilios Panayiotou (loan return from Olympiakos Nicosia) |
| 20 | FW | CYP | Pieros Sotiriou (from Olympiakos Nicosia) |
| 3 | DF | BRA | João Guilherme (from (Portugal) Marítimo) |
| 8 | MF | POR | Tiago Gomes (from (England) Blackpool) |
| 4 | MF | CYP | Kostakis Artymatas (from Enosis Neon Paralimni) |
| 25 | MF | BRA | Christian (on loan from (Brazil) Grêmio Anápolis) |
| 9 | FW | IRL | Cillian Sheridan (from (Scotland) Kilmarnock) |
| 23 | FW | POR | Esmaël Gonçalves (on loan from (Portugal) Rio Ave) |
| 16 | MF | BRA | Vinícius (from (Portugal) S.C. Braga) |
| 55 | DF | POR | Hélder Cabral (from (Portugal) Académica de Coimbra) |

Out: Note: Flags indicate national team as defined under FIFA eligibility rules; some limited exceptions apply. Players may hold more than one non-FIFA nationality.

| No. | Pos. | Nation | Player |
|---|---|---|---|
| — | DF | CYP | Andreas Christofides (on loan to Alki Larnaca) |
| — | MF | CYP | Emilios Panayiotou (on loan to Alki Larnaca) |
| 16 | FW | ISR | Dudu Biton (loan return to (Belgium) Standard Liège) |
| 20 | MF | GRE | Alexandros Tziolis (loan return to (France) AS Monaco) |
| 1 | GK | CYP | Panos Constantinou (to Aris Limassol) |
| 23 | MF | POR | Hélio Pinto (to (Poland) Legia Warsaw) |
| 55 | DF | GRE | Christos Karipidis (to Apollon Limassol) |
| 90 | MF | DEN | Mikkel Beckmann (to (Sweden) Elfsborg) |
| 30 | DF | ANG | Francisco Zuela (to (Greece) Apollon Smyrnis) |
| 5 | DF | CAN | Michael Klukowski (released) |
| 40 | MF | CYP | Markos Charalambous (on loan to Olympiakos Nicosia) |

=== Apollon Limassol ===
In: Note: Flags indicate national team as defined under FIFA eligibility rules; some limited exceptions apply. Players may hold more than one non-FIFA nationality.

| No. | Pos. | Nation | Player |
|---|---|---|---|
| 23 | GK | ALB | Isli Hidi (from AEL Limassol) |
| 18 | DF | ROU | Ovidiu Dănănae (from (Romania) Turnu Severin) |
| 92 | FW | CAN | Daniel Haber (from (Israel) Maccabi Haifa) |
| 6 | MF | ESP | Marcos Gullón (from (Spain) Racing Santander) |
| 55 | DF | GRE | Christos Karipidis (from APOEL) |
| 10 | FW | ARG | Gastón Sangoy (from (Spain) Sporting Gijón) |
| 20 | MF | FRA | Bertrand Robert (from (Greece) PAOK) |
| 21 | DF | ESP | José Catalá (from (Spain) Real Murcia) |
| 19 | FW | CIV | Abraham Gneki Guié (on loan from (France) Nice) |
| 12 | MF | ROU | Ștefan Grigorie (free agent) |
| 14 | MF | FRA | Camel Meriem (from (France) Nice) |
| 13 | DF | COL | David Mena Rojas (from (Colombia) Deportivo Cali) |
| 15 | FW | NGA | Eze Vincent Okeuhie (from (Turkey) Kartalspor) |

Out: Note: Flags indicate national team as defined under FIFA eligibility rules; some limited exceptions apply. Players may hold more than one non-FIFA nationality.

| No. | Pos. | Nation | Player |
|---|---|---|---|
| 2 | DF | POR | Toni (to AEK Larnaca) |
| 4 | MF | ARG | Horacio Cardozo (to (Greece) Ergotelis) |
| 9 | FW | GRE | Dimitris Souanis (to (Greece) Kerkyra) |
| 10 | MF | GRE | Giorgos Theodoridis (to (Greece) Panetolikos) |
| 13 | MF | ARG | Emmanuel Serra (released) |
| 18 | MF | CRO | Ivan Parlov (released) |
| 32 | FW | ARG | Esteban Solari (to (Greece) Skoda Xanthi) |
| 33 | GK | CYP | Sofronis Avgousti (retired) |
| 81 | DF | POR | Miguelito (to (Portugal) Moreirense) |
| 22 | DF | BRA | Paulinho (to Ermis Aradippou) |
| 20 | FW | ROU | Romeo Surdu (to (Romania) FC Brașov) |

=== Aris Limassol ===
In: Note: Flags indicate national team as defined under FIFA eligibility rules; some limited exceptions apply. Players may hold more than one non-FIFA nationality.

| No. | Pos. | Nation | Player |
|---|---|---|---|
| 55 | MF | CYP | Neophytos Chrysostomou (loan return from Enosis Neon Parekklisia) |
| — | DF | UKR | Maksym Ilchysh (from AEL Limassol) |
| 10 | MF | POR | Hugo Moutinho (from (Romania) Studențesc Iași) |
| 9 | FW | ROU | Mihai Dina (from (Romania) Poli Timișoara) |
| 8 | MF | CPV | Edson Cruz (from (Portugal) C.D. Trofense) |
| 39 | FW | NGA | Emmanuel Okoye (from (Greece) Panionios) |
| — | DF | CYP | Minas Antoniou (from AEZ Zakakiou) |
| 17 | FW | CYP | Demetris Theofanous (from Nikos & Sokratis Erimis) |
| 6 | MF | CYP | Panos Theodorou (from Nikos & Sokratis Erimis) |
| 16 | MF | BUL | Dimitar Petkov (from (Georgia (country)) Zestaponi) |
| 27 | FW | MKD | Filip Timov (from (Armenia) FC Impulse) |
| 89 | GK | CYP | Panos Constantinou (from APOEL) |
| 29 | GK | HUN | Zoltán Kovács (free agent) |
| 33 | DF | ARG | Maximiliano Oliva (from (Argentina) San Martin SJ) |
| 2 | DF | NED | René Osei Kofi (from (North Macedonia) FK Drita) |
| 21 | DF | ITA | Davide Grassi (from (Scotland) Dundee F.C.) |
| 30 | FW | BRA | Thuram (on loan from (Brazil) Atlético Paranaense) |
| 3 | DF | BRA | Douglas (from (Brazil) Rio Verde GO) |

Out: Note: Flags indicate national team as defined under FIFA eligibility rules; some limited exceptions apply. Players may hold more than one non-FIFA nationality.

| No. | Pos. | Nation | Player |
|---|---|---|---|
| 27 | FW | CYP | Ioannis Chadjivasilis (loan return to Omonia) |
| 15 | MF | BRA | Wender (retired) |
| 17 | GK | CYP | Charalambos Kairinos (to AEK Kouklia) |
| 9 | FW | CYP | Alekos Alekou (to (Greece) PAO Krousona) |
| 81 | DF | CYP | Loizos Kakoyiannis (released) |
| 30 | MF | CYP | Simos Krassas (released) |
| 2 | DF | SVN | Marko Barun (released) |
| 8 | MF | POR | Pedro Alves (to (Portugal) Oriental) |
| 7 | MF | GNB | Bafodé Carvalho (released) |
| 40 | GK | CYP | Andreas Photiou (to Nea Salamina) |
| 11 | FW | CYP | Andreas Kyprianou (to Ermis Aradippou) |
| 4 | DF | CYP | Alexandros Demetriou (to AEK Kouklia) |
| 92 | DF | CYP | Stefanos Erotokritou (to AEP Paphos) |
| — | DF | UKR | Maksym Ilchysh (to (Ukraine) Kremin) |

=== Doxa Katokopias ===
In: Note: Flags indicate national team as defined under FIFA eligibility rules; some limited exceptions apply. Players may hold more than one non-FIFA nationality.

| No. | Pos. | Nation | Player |
|---|---|---|---|
| — | GK | ESP | Pulpo Romero (loan return from AEK Larnaca) |
| 44 | MF | CIV | Lamine N'dao (loan return from Olympiakos Nicosia) |
| 19 | FW | BRA | Leandro (from (Portugal) SC Mirandela) |
| 6 | DF | POR | Bruno Simão (from (Moldova) FC Milsami) |
| 38 | MF | BRA | Gleison (free agent) |
| 7 | MF | ESP | Fran Piera (from (Spain) CD Alcoyano) |
| 40 | MF | CYP | Giorgos Economides (from PAEEK FC) |
| 11 | FW | POR | Carlitos (from (Portugal) Sport União Sintrense) |
| 17 | DF | POR | Tiago Costa (from (Israel) Hapoel Tel Aviv) |
| 9 | FW | BRA | Ricardo Lobo (free agent) |
| 22 | FW | POR | Hélio Vaz (from (Portugal) U.D. Leiria) |
| 8 | MF | ESP | Dani López (from (Spain) CF Fuenlabrada) |
| 1 | GK | GHA | Richard Kingson (free agent) |
| 23 | MF | SRB | Miloš Pavlović (free agent) |
| 28 | FW | UKR | Vitalii Doroshenko (from (Portugal) União Nogueirense) |
| 27 | MF | POR | Pedrinho (from (Portugal) União Nogueirense) |
| 3 | DF | ESP | Pedro Baquero (from (Spain) Real Oviedo) |
| 77 | MF | ESP | Pedrito (from (Spain) Reus) |
| 33 | DF | CYP | Elias Charalambous (from (Romania) Vaslui) |
| 6 | MF | ESP | Rodri (from (Spain) UCAM Murcia) |

Out: Note: Flags indicate national team as defined under FIFA eligibility rules; some limited exceptions apply. Players may hold more than one non-FIFA nationality.

| No. | Pos. | Nation | Player |
|---|---|---|---|
| 30 | GK | BRA | Alexandre Negri (loan return to AEK Larnaca) |
| 77 | FW | NGA | Kabiru Akinsola (loan return to (Spain) Granada CF) |
| — | GK | ESP | Pulpo Romero (to AEL Limassol) |
| 7 | MF | POR | Carlos André (to (Greece) Tyrnavos 2005) |
| 26 | FW | CIV | Gaossou Fofana (on loan to Anorthosis Famagusta) |
| 8 | MF | POR | Vítor Castanheira (retired) |
| 2 | DF | ESP | Juan Pedro Pina (to (Spain) La Hoya Lorca) |
| 14 | DF | ENG | Michael Weir (released) |
| 9 | FW | CPV | Toy (released) |
| 23 | MF | ESP | Jorge Troiteiro (to (Spain) Mérida) |
| 34 | DF | BRA | Leandro Silva (released) |
| 17 | DF | CYP | Andreas Hadjigeorgiou (to APEP) |
| 18 | MF | SRB | Semir Hadžibulić (to (Montenegro) FK Čelik Nikšić) |
| 6 | DF | POR | Bruno Simão (to (Moldova) FC Dacia) |
| 6 | DF | GRE | Stefanos Siontis (to (Greece) Veria) |
| 22 | FW | POR | Hélio Vaz (to (Portugal) U.D. Leiria) |

=== Enosis Neon Paralimni ===
In: Note: Flags indicate national team as defined under FIFA eligibility rules; some limited exceptions apply. Players may hold more than one non-FIFA nationality.

| No. | Pos. | Nation | Player |
|---|---|---|---|
| 11 | FW | CYP | Marios Zannetou (from Onisilos Sotira) |
| 29 | DF | CYP | Demetris Moulazimis (on loan from Omonia) |
| 89 | DF | CRO | Dino Gavrić (from (Poland) Widzew Łódź) |
| 21 | MF | SVN | Nikola Tolimir (from (Romania) Ceahlăul Piatra Neamț) |
| 9 | MF | POR | Ricardo Catchana (from Ayia Napa) |
| 5 | DF | CRO | Igor Gal (from (Hungary) Diósgyőr) |
| 8 | MF | ZAM | William Njobvu (free agent) |
| 88 | MF | CYP | Georgios Aresti (from (Greece) AEK Athens) |
| 28 | MF | UKR | Maksym Borovets (from (Ukraine) Bukovyna Chernivtsi) |
| 7 | MF | ESP | Hugo López (from (Israel) Ironi Nir Ramat HaSharon) |
| 6 | MF | CYP | Angelos Tsiaklis (free agent) |
| 19 | MF | ESP | Igor Angulo (from (Spain) Real Unión) |
| 4 | DF | ESP | Javi Cantero (from (Spain) Real Oviedo) |
| 20 | FW | CZE | Ondřej Smetana (free agent) |
| 1 | GK | CYP | Christos Mastrou (from Anorthosis Famagusta) |
| 17 | MF | GUA | Gerardo Gordillo (from (Guatemala) Antigua GFC) |
| 14 | DF | NGA | Ibrahim Salau (from (Belgium) KVC Westerlo) |
| 45 | FW | NGA | Monday Shinshima (from (Nigeria) Westerlo Football Academy Lagos) |

Out: Note: Flags indicate national team as defined under FIFA eligibility rules; some limited exceptions apply. Players may hold more than one non-FIFA nationality.

| No. | Pos. | Nation | Player |
|---|---|---|---|
| 18 | DF | GRE | Stavros Stathakis (loan return to (Greece) Skoda Xanthi) |
| 28 | MF | NED | Tom Daemen (loan return to AEK Larnaca) |
| 20 | FW | NGA | Emmanuel Okoduwa (released) |
| 3 | MF | MTN | Yoann Langlet (to (Switzerland) FC Fribourg) |
| 5 | DF | BRA | Anderson (released) |
| 19 | DF | EQG | Rui (to (Spain) Real Ávila) |
| 2 | DF | GRE | Aris Galanopoulos (to (Greece) Glyfada) |
| 15 | MF | POR | Zé Vítor (to (Portugal) União da Madeira) |
| 88 | MF | SRB | Radovan Krivokapić (to (Serbia) Radnički Kragujevac) |
| 14 | FW | SVK | Tomáš Oravec (released) |
| 23 | GK | SEN | Bouna Coundoul (to Ethnikos Achna) |
| 1 | GK | MLT | Andrew Hogg (to (Greece) AEL Kalloni) |
| 4 | MF | CYP | Kostakis Artymatas (to APOEL) |
| 6 | MF | POR | Hugo Faria (to (Greece) AEL Kalloni) |
| 55 | DF | POR | Carlos Milhazes (to (Greece) OFI) |
| 29 | DF | CYP | Demetris Moulazimis (to Omonia) |
| 9 | FW | SRB | Miljan Mrdaković (to (Greece) Veria) |
| 17 | MF | CYP | Demos Goumenos (to Ayia Napa) |
| 12 | FW | GHA | Shaibu Yakubu (to (Turkey) 1461 Trabzon) |

=== Ermis Aradippou ===
In: Note: Flags indicate national team as defined under FIFA eligibility rules; some limited exceptions apply. Players may hold more than one non-FIFA nationality.

| No. | Pos. | Nation | Player |
|---|---|---|---|
| 31 | GK | CYP | Athos Chrysostomou (from Ayia Napa) |
| 9 | FW | POR | Henrique (from Olympiakos Nicosia) |
| 11 | FW | NGA | Marco Tagbajumi (from APEP) |
| 88 | MF | BRA | Diogo Melo (from (Brazil) União Barbarense) |
| 2 | MF | GEO | Levan Maghradze (from Ethnikos Achna) |
| 23 | MF | BRA | Marcos De Azevedo (from (Switzerland) Servette) |
| 3 | DF | SRB | Dragan Žarković (from (Romania) FCM Târgu Mureș) |
| 6 | FW | POR | Gonçalo Abreu (from (Portugal) Marítimo) |
| 4 | MF | CYP | Pantelis Pitsillos (from Enosis Neon Parekklisia) |
| — | MF | CYP | Alexandros Garpozis (from AEP Paphos) |
| — | FW | CYP | Andreas Kyprianou (from Aris Limassol) |
| 75 | MF | GLP | Matthieu Bemba (from (France) UJA Maccabi) |
| 25 | DF | CPV | Paulo Pina (from Olympiakos Nicosia) |
| 20 | DF | POR | China (from (Ukraine) Metalurh Donetsk) |
| 99 | GK | BRA | Elinton Andrade (from (Brazil) Náutico) |
| 22 | DF | BRA | Paulinho (from Apollon Limassol) |
| 10 | MF | MKD | Armend Alimi (from Nea Salamina) |
| 19 | MF | ESP | Luis Morán (from (Spain) Mirandés) |
| 1 | GK | GRE | Giannis Arabatzis (free agent) |
| 7 | MF | BRA | Césinha (from (Romania) Petrolul Ploiești) |

Out: Note: Flags indicate national team as defined under FIFA eligibility rules; some limited exceptions apply. Players may hold more than one non-FIFA nationality.

| No. | Pos. | Nation | Player |
|---|---|---|---|
| 25 | GK | GRE | Dimitrios Sotiriou (to (Greece) PAS Giannina) |
| 21 | MF | CYP | Giorgos Panagi (to Nea Salamina) |
| 5 | DF | CYP | Orthodoxos Ioannou (to Othellos Athienou) |
| 4 | DF | BEL | Laurent Fassotte (to Ayia Napa) |
| 11 | DF | HUN | Lajos Terjék (to Othellos Athienou) |
| 91 | GK | CYP | Giorgos Papadopoulos (to Anagennisi Dherynia) |
| 10 | MF | CYP | Charis Loizou (to Onisilos Sotira) |
| 26 | DF | GRE | Stavros Nicolaou (to Othellos Athienou) |
| 23 | MF | CYP | Christodoulos Kountouretis (to Omonia Aradippou) |
| 19 | FW | CYP | Andreas Pittaras (to Nikos & Sokratis Erimis) |
| 28 | MF | CYP | Costas Adamou (released) |
| 24 | FW | SWE | Michelé Adzic (to (Portugal) Leça) |
| 22 | FW | POR | Bruno Luz (on loan to PAEEK FC) |
| — | FW | CYP | Andreas Kyprianou (to Anagennisi Dherynia) |
| 20 | MF | CYP | Marios Charalambous (to Alki Larnaca) |
| — | DF | CYP | Alexandros Garpozis (to AEK Kouklia) |

=== Ethnikos Achna ===
In: Note: Flags indicate national team as defined under FIFA eligibility rules; some limited exceptions apply. Players may hold more than one non-FIFA nationality.

| No. | Pos. | Nation | Player |
|---|---|---|---|
| 32 | MF | CYP | Antonis Katsis (from Alki Larnaca) |
| 22 | MF | SRB | Predrag Lazić (from Ayia Napa) |
| 8 | DF | GRE | Nikos Barboudis (from Ayia Napa) |
| 16 | MF | POR | Hugo Soares (from Ayia Napa) |
| 15 | FW | NGA | Chidi Onyemah (from (Greece) Platanias) |
| 40 | GK | CYP | Kyriacos Ioannou (from PAEEK FC) |
| 82 | FW | BRA | Rafael Ledesma (from (Lithuania) FK Sūduva) |
| 5 | DF | ESP | Bidari (from (Spain) S.S. Reyes) |
| 7 | FW | BRA | Liliu (from (Brazil) EC Rio Verde) |
| 18 | MF | ESP | Rubén Arroyo (from (Spain) SD Eibar) |
| 77 | FW | CIV | Rodolph Amessan (on loan from AEL Limassol) |
| 17 | FW | GHA | Samad Oppong (from (Ghana) Ashanti Gold) |
| 6 | DF | SEN | Gora Tall (from AEP Paphos) |
| 1 | GK | SEN | Bouna Coundoul (from Enosis Neon Paralimni) |
| 9 | FW | CYP | Christoforos Xenofontos (from Ethnikos Assia) |
| 4 | DF | CYP | Panayiotis Frantzeskou (from Chalkanoras Idaliou) |
| 30 | MF | CYP | Demetris Kyriakou (on loan from AEK Larnaca) |

Out: Note: Flags indicate national team as defined under FIFA eligibility rules; some limited exceptions apply. Players may hold more than one non-FIFA nationality.

| No. | Pos. | Nation | Player |
|---|---|---|---|
| 9 | FW | POR | Marco Paixão (to (Poland) Śląsk Wrocław) |
| 2 | MF | GEO | Levan Maghradze (to Ermis Aradippou) |
| 44 | GK | CRO | Marko Šarlija (to (Croatia) NK Lokomotiva) |
| 33 | DF | SWE | Fredrik Risp (retired) |
| 12 | GK | MKD | Marko Jovanovski (to (North Macedonia) FK Shkëndija) |
| 25 | DF | CRO | Vinko Buden (to (Croatia) NK Lučko) |
| 28 | FW | ZIM | Edward Mashinya (to Onisilos Sotira) |
| 24 | FW | ESP | Arnal Llibert (to (Malta) Valletta F.C.) |
| 11 | MF | ARG | Marcelo Penta (to (Greece) Aiginiakos) |
| 7 | MF | CYP | Elias Vattis (to Nea Salamina) |
| 16 | MF | CYP | Elpidoforos Elia (to Nea Salamina) |
| 18 | MF | POR | Vítor Lima (to (Greece) Iraklis) |
| 1 | GK | POL | Arkadiusz Malarz (to (Poland) GKS Bełchatów) |
| 15 | DF | CYP | Dimitris Simov (released) |
| 6 | MF | CYP | Angelos Perikleous (to Nikos & Sokratis Erimis) |
| 17 | DF | CYP | Nicos Pitsillidis (to Nikos & Sokratis Erimis) |

=== Nea Salamina ===
In: Note: Flags indicate national team as defined under FIFA eligibility rules; some limited exceptions apply. Players may hold more than one non-FIFA nationality.

| No. | Pos. | Nation | Player |
|---|---|---|---|
| 6 | MF | GRE | Giannis Taralidis (from (Greece) Doxa Drama) |
| 11 | FW | CYP | Charalambos Demosthenous (from AEP Paphos) |
| 7 | MF | CYP | Elias Vattis (from Ethnikos Achna) |
| 21 | MF | CYP | Giorgos Panagi (from Ermis Aradippou) |
| 77 | FW | CYP | Constantinos Mintikkis (from Omonia Aradippou) |
| 89 | MF | GRE | Stergios Psianos (from (Greece) Niki Volos) |
| 9 | FW | HON | Allan Lalín (from (Greece) Niki Volos) |
| 14 | FW | CYP | Stamatis Pantos (from AEK Kouklia) |
| 8 | MF | CRO | Ivan Ćurjurić (from (Croatia) NK Zagreb) |
| 18 | MF | CYP | Elpidoforos Elia (from Ethnikos Achna) |
| 81 | FW | MLI | Tenema N'Diaye (from (Greece) Kavala) |
| 1 | GK | LTU | Ernestas Šetkus (from (Belarus) FC Gomel) |
| — | DF | GRE | Dimitris Raptakis (from (Greece) AEL) |
| — | MF | GRE | Manolis Liapakis (from (Greece) AEL) |
| 92 | MF | GRE | Angelos Pournos (from (Greece) Vyzas Megara) |
| 10 | MF | ESP | Diego León (from (Greece) Kerkyra) |
| 40 | GK | CYP | Andreas Photiou (from Aris Limassol) |
| — | DF | ALB | Kostandin Ndoni (from (Albania) Apolonia Fier) |
| 3 | MF | CYP | Siniša Dobrašinović (free agent) |
| 25 | DF | CRO | Dino Škvorc (from (Israel) Beitar Jerusalem) |
| 12 | GK | MNE | Srđan Blažić (from Anorthosis Famagusta) |
| 5 | DF | BRA | Éder Monteiro (from (Greece) Kerkyra) |

Out: Note: Flags indicate national team as defined under FIFA eligibility rules; some limited exceptions apply. Players may hold more than one non-FIFA nationality.

| No. | Pos. | Nation | Player |
|---|---|---|---|
| 32 | GK | MNE | Srđan Blažić (loan return to Anorthosis) |
| 33 | DF | CYP | Nikos Englezou (loan return to (Greece) AEK Athens) |
| 77 | MF | SVN | Enes Rujović (released) |
| 82 | FW | SRB | Vuk Sotirović (to (Serbia) Javor Ivanjica) |
| 11 | FW | ENG | Julian Gray (to (England) Walsall) |
| 50 | DF | LBR | Solomon Grimes (released) |
| 10 | DF | ESP | David Sousa (to (Spain) Xerez) |
| 3 | DF | CPV | Jimmy Modeste (to (Greece) Glyfada) |
| 27 | FW | EST | Andres Oper (released) |
| 19 | MF | POR | Saavedra (to (Greece) Glyfada) |
| 16 | MF | MKD | Armend Alimi (to Ermis Aradippou) |
| 4 | DF | ESP | Iván Benítez (to (Azerbaijan) Inter Baku) |
| 26 | DF | HUN | Károly Graszl (to (Hungary) Gyirmót SE) |
| 5 | MF | GRE | Giorgos Lambropoulos (to (Greece) Levadiakos) |
| 99 | GK | CYP | Evagoras Hadjifrangiskou (to Omonia) |
| 6 | MF | CYP | Christos Modestou (to Anagennisi Dherynia) |
| 7 | MF | CYP | Prodromos Therapontos (to Anagennisi Dherynia) |
| — | DF | ALB | Kostandin Ndoni (on loan to Othellos Athienou) |
| — | DF | GRE | Dimitris Raptakis (to (Greece) Kerkyra) |
| — | MF | GRE | Manolis Liapakis (to (Greece) Doxa Drama) |
| 30 | DF | CYP | Modestos Sotiriou (on loan to Anagennisi Dherynia) |
| 92 | MF | GRE | Angelos Pournos (on loan to Karmiotissa Polemidion) |

=== Omonia ===
In: Note: Flags indicate national team as defined under FIFA eligibility rules; some limited exceptions apply. Players may hold more than one non-FIFA nationality.

| No. | Pos. | Nation | Player |
|---|---|---|---|
| — | FW | CYP | Theodosis Kyprou (loan return from Chalkanoras Idaliou) |
| 1 | GK | SUI | Johnny Leoni (loan return from (Azerbaijan) Neftchi Baku) |
| 13 | DF | ALG | Sofiane Cherfa (loan return from (Greece) Panthrakikos) |
| 33 | FW | CYP | Ioannis Chadjivasilis (loan return from Aris Limassol) |
| 83 | GK | ENG | Corrin Brooks-Meade (from Alki Larnaca) |
| 77 | FW | USA | Tony Taylor (from (Portugal) Estoril Praia) |
| 20 | MF | CPV | Platini (from (Portugal) Santa Clara) |
| 4 | DF | ESP | José (from (Spain) Girona) |
| 9 | FW | POL | Łukasz Gikiewicz (from (Poland) Śląsk Wrocław) |
| 5 | DF | CGO | Pieter Mbemba (from (Israel) Bnei Sakhnin) |
| 99 | GK | CYP | Evagoras Hadjifrangiskou (from Nea Salamina) |
| — | DF | CYP | Demetris Moulazimis (from Enosis Neon Paralimni) |
| 11 | MF | BRA | Alípio (from (Portugal) Benfica B) |
| 25 | DF | NGA | Ganiu Ogungbe (from (Nigeria) Kwara United) |
| 29 | FW | CMR | Justin Mengolo (from (Tunisia) Étoile du Sahel) |

Out: Note: Flags indicate national team as defined under FIFA eligibility rules; some limited exceptions apply. Players may hold more than one non-FIFA nationality.

| No. | Pos. | Nation | Player |
|---|---|---|---|
| 9 | FW | ANG | Freddy (to (Angola) Primeiro de Agosto) |
| 6 | MF | POR | João Alves (to (Portugal) Académico Viseu) |
| 32 | GK | GRE | Makis Giannikoglou (to Alki Larnaca) |
| 24 | DF | ISR | Yuval Spungin (to (Belgium) Mons) |
| 77 | FW | CYP | Demetris Christofi (to (Switzerland) FC Sion) |
| 25 | FW | BRA | Andre Alves (to (United Arab Emirates) Dubai CSC) |
| 14 | DF | BRA | Danielson (to (Portugal) Gil Vicente) |
| 26 | GK | ISR | Ohad Levita (to (Israel) Maccabi Netanya) |
| — | DF | CYP | Demetris Moulazimis (on loan to Enosis Neon Paralimni) |
| — | FW | CYP | Theodosis Kyprou (to Chalkanoras Idaliou) |
| 1 | GK | SUI | Johnny Leoni (to (Portugal) Marítimo) |
| 13 | FW | CYP | Marios Demetriou (on loan to Alki Larnaca) |
| 81 | MF | CYP | Stavros Christoudias (on loan to Alki Larnaca) |
| 80 | MF | CYP | Fanos Katelaris (on loan to Alki Larnaca) |
| 37 | MF | CYP | Andreas Frantzeskou (on loan to Alki Larnaca) |

== Cypriot Second Division ==
=== B1 Division ===
==== AEP Paphos ====
In: Note: Flags indicate national team as defined under FIFA eligibility rules; some limited exceptions apply. Players may hold more than one non-FIFA nationality.

| No. | Pos. | Nation | Player |
|---|---|---|---|
| — | DF | CYP | Stefanos Erotokritou (from Aris Limassol) |
| — | FW | CYP | Nicolas Theodorou (from Nikos & Sokratis Erimis) |
| — | FW | CYP | Michalis Sykas (from Nikos & Sokratis Erimis) |
| — | MF | CYP | Christos Nicolaou (from Nikos & Sokratis Erimis) |
| — | DF | SCO | Craig Thomson (free agent) |
| — | DF | POR | Hugo Coelho (free agent) |

Out: Note: Flags indicate national team as defined under FIFA eligibility rules; some limited exceptions apply. Players may hold more than one non-FIFA nationality.

| No. | Pos. | Nation | Player |
|---|---|---|---|
| 15 | GK | ALB | Erind Prifti (loan return to AEL) |
| 45 | MF | CYP | Andreas Makris (to Anorthosis Famagusta) |
| 72 | FW | BUL | Kostadin Bashov (to (Bulgaria) Pirin Gotse Delchev) |
| 5 | DF | SEN | Gora Tall (to Ethnikos Achna) |
| 4 | DF | CYP | Ioannis Savva (to AEK Kouklia) |
| 28 | MF | CYP | Ioannis Varnavidis (to AEK Kouklia) |
| 21 | MF | CYP | Angelos Efthymiou (to AEK Kouklia) |
| 7 | FW | CYP | Charalambos Demosthenous (to Nea Salamina) |
| 19 | MF | CYP | Alexandros Garpozis (to Ermis Aradippou) |
| 48 | MF | CYP | Giorgos Sielis (to AEK Kouklia) |
| — | FW | CYP | Nicolas Theodorou (to APEP) |
| — | FW | CYP | Michalis Sykas (to APEP) |
| — | MF | CYP | Christos Nicolaou (to APEP) |

==== Anagennisi Dherynia ====
In: Note: Flags indicate national team as defined under FIFA eligibility rules; some limited exceptions apply. Players may hold more than one non-FIFA nationality.

| No. | Pos. | Nation | Player |
|---|---|---|---|
| 91 | GK | CYP | Giorgos Papadopoulos (from Ermis Aradippou) |
| 6 | MF | CYP | Christos Modestou (from Nea Salamina) |
| 7 | MF | CYP | Prodromos Therapontos (from Nea Salamina) |
| 71 | MF | CYP | Kyriacos Apostolou (from Omonia Aradippou) |
| 12 | DF | CYP | Kyriacos Kyriacou (from Omonia Aradippou) |
| 8 | FW | MAR | Hicham Chirouf (from (France) US Sarre-Union) |
| 9 | FW | CYP | Andreas Kyprianou (from Ermis Aradippou) |
| 14 | DF | ISR | Nir Mansour (free agent) |
| 20 | MF | GRE | Panagiotis Linardos (from Anorthosis Famagusta) |
| 16 | DF | CYP | Modestos Sotiriou (on loan from Nea Salamina) |

Out: Note: Flags indicate national team as defined under FIFA eligibility rules; some limited exceptions apply. Players may hold more than one non-FIFA nationality.

| No. | Pos. | Nation | Player |
|---|---|---|---|
| 7 | MF | CYP | Adamos Hadjigeorgiou (loan return to Anorthosis Famagusta) |
| 6 | DF | CYP | Christos Kotsonis (retired) |
| 14 | MF | POR | Jorge Neves (to (Portugal) C.D. Fátima) |
| 20 | GK | CYP | Panayiotis Charalambous (retired) |
| 23 | DF | CYP | Demos Demosthenous (released) |
| 21 | FW | POR | Wesllem (to AEK Kouklia) |
| 78 | GK | POL | Maciej Zając (to Othellos Athienou) |
| 15 | MF | SWE | Nino Osmanagić (to (Sweden) Norrby) |
| 8 | MF | ENG | Harrison Bayley (released) |
| 91 | MF | GHA | Felix Kenu (released) |

==== APEP Pitsilia ====
In: Note: Flags indicate national team as defined under FIFA eligibility rules; some limited exceptions apply. Players may hold more than one non-FIFA nationality.

| No. | Pos. | Nation | Player |
|---|---|---|---|
| 6 | MF | CYP | Fanos Vasiliou (from Anorthosis Famagusta U21) |
| 40 | MF | CYP | Panayiotis Mikelli (from Anorthosis Famagusta U21) |
| 10 | MF | CYP | Andreas Kalos (from Ethnikos Latsion FC) |
| 7 | DF | CYP | Andreas Hadjigeorgiou (from Doxa Katokopias) |
| 11 | MF | CYP | Christoforos Efthymiou (from AEL Limassol U21) |
| 77 | MF | CYP | Vryonis Polydorou (from Apollon Limassol U21) |
| — | GK | CYP | Zinonas Papafilippou (from Elpida Astromeriti) |
| 21 | DF | CYP | Panayiotis Foklas (from AEZ Zakakiou) |
| 33 | MF | CYP | Andreas Christou (from AEL Limassol U21) |
| 2 | DF | CYP | Iakovos Theofilou (from APOEL U21) |
| 12 | FW | CYP | Nicolas Theodorou (to APEP) |
| 32 | FW | CYP | Michalis Sykas (to APEP) |
| 14 | MF | CYP | Christos Nicolaou (to APEP) |

Out: Note: Flags indicate national team as defined under FIFA eligibility rules; some limited exceptions apply. Players may hold more than one non-FIFA nationality.

| No. | Pos. | Nation | Player |
|---|---|---|---|
| 10 | FW | CYP | Marios Neophytou (to Ayia Napa) |
| 77 | DF | CYP | Stelios Longras (retired) |
| 23 | FW | NGA | Marco Tagbajumi (to Ermis Aradippou) |
| 8 | DF | RWA | Lewis Aniweta (to Ayia Napa) |
| 7 | MF | NGA | Joshua Izuchukwu (to Ayia Napa) |
| 3 | DF | CYP | Stefanos Matsoukas (to Nikos & Sokratis Erimis) |
| 20 | DF | CYP | Irodotos Stavrou (to Nikos & Sokratis Erimis) |
| 1 | GK | CYP | Demetris Leoni (to Ayia Napa) |
| 18 | MF | CYP | Elias Elia (to Nikos & Sokratis Erimis) |
| 90 | MF | CYP | Andreas Zinonos (to Ayia Napa) |
| 9 | FW | CYP | Giorgos Neophytou (to Karmiotissa Polemidion) |

==== Ayia Napa ====
In: Note: Flags indicate national team as defined under FIFA eligibility rules; some limited exceptions apply. Players may hold more than one non-FIFA nationality.

| No. | Pos. | Nation | Player |
|---|---|---|---|
| 10 | FW | CYP | Marios Neophytou (from APEP) |
| 15 | DF | CYP | Antonis Moushis (from Onisilos Sotira) |
| 5 | MF | CYP | Nicolas Manoli (from Othellos Athienou) |
| 8 | DF | RWA | Lewis Aniweta (from APEP) |
| 7 | MF | NGA | Joshua Izuchukwu (from APEP) |
| 23 | MF | CPV | Spencer (from PAEEK FC) |
| 24 | DF | CYP | Ioannis Antoniou (from Onisilos Sotira) |
| 1 | GK | CYP | Demetris Leoni (from APEP) |
| 4 | DF | BEL | Laurent Fassotte (from Ermis Aradippou) |
| 19 | MF | CYP | Marios Louka (from AEK Kouklia) |
| 27 | DF | CYP | Petros Messios (from Othellos Athienou) |
| 30 | MF | CYP | Costas Markou (from Nikos & Sokratis Erimis) |
| 33 | MF | CYP | Andreas Zinonos (from APEP) |
| 18 | FW | POR | Pio Júnior (from Benfica Macau) |
| 17 | MF | CYP | Demos Goumenos (from Enosis Neon Paralimni) |

Out: Note: Flags indicate national team as defined under FIFA eligibility rules; some limited exceptions apply. Players may hold more than one non-FIFA nationality.

| No. | Pos. | Nation | Player |
|---|---|---|---|
| 32 | MF | CYP | Antonis Katsis (loan return to Alki Larnaca) |
| 24 | MF | CYP | Zacharias Theodorou (loan return to Anorthosis Famagusta) |
| 6 | MF | BRA | Paulo Sérgio (to (Portugal) Beira-Mar) |
| 13 | DF | ISR | Uri Peso (to (Israel) Hapoel Petah Tikva) |
| 7 | MF | BIH | Branislav Nikić (to (Switzerland) FC Wohlen) |
| 21 | DF | POR | Fausto (to (Portugal) S.C. Farense) |
| 23 | DF | POR | Ginho (to (Portugal) União Madeira) |
| 55 | MF | POR | Miguel Vargas (released) |
| 28 | FW | POR | Vítor Afonso (released) |
| 12 | FW | BRA | Jackson (released) |
| 31 | GK | CYP | Athos Chrysostomou (to Ermis Aradippou) |
| 9 | MF | SRB | Predrag Lazić (to Ethnikos Achna) |
| 8 | DF | GRE | Nikos Barboudis (to Ethnikos Achna) |
| 3 | DF | CYP | Adamos Pierettis (released) |
| 16 | MF | POR | Hugo Soares (to Ethnikos Achna) |
| 10 | MF | POR | Ricardo Catchana (to Enosis Neon Paralimni) |

==== Nikos & Sokratis Erimis ====
In: Note: Flags indicate national team as defined under FIFA eligibility rules; some limited exceptions apply. Players may hold more than one non-FIFA nationality.

| No. | Pos. | Nation | Player |
|---|---|---|---|
| 3 | DF | CYP | Stefanos Matsoukas (from APEP) |
| 8 | MF | CYP | Christos Makris (from Atromitos Yeroskipou) |
| 54 | GK | CYP | Constantinos Zacharoudiou (from Anorthosis Famagusta) |
| — | DF | CYP | Irodotos Stavrou (from APEP) |
| 30 | FW | CYP | Giorgos Georgiou (from Ethnikos Latsion FC) |
| 10 | MF | CYP | Angelos Perikleous (from Ethnikos Achna) |
| 25 | MF | CYP | Nicos Pitsillidis (from Ethnikos Achna) |
| — | MF | CYP | Elias Elia (from APEP) |
| 56 | GK | CYP | Simos Tsiakkas (from AEL Limassol) |
| 9 | FW | CYP | Andreas Pittaras (from Ermis Aradippou) |
| 14 | FW | CYP | Marcos Michael (on loan from Anorthosis Famagusta) |
| 17 | MF | CYP | David Neofytou (on loan from AEL Limassol) |

Out: Note: Flags indicate national team as defined under FIFA eligibility rules; some limited exceptions apply. Players may hold more than one non-FIFA nationality.

| No. | Pos. | Nation | Player |
|---|---|---|---|
| — | GK | CYP | Theodosis Iosif (to ENAD Polis Chrysochous) |
| 30 | MF | CYP | Costas Markou (to Ayia Napa) |
| 14 | FW | CYP | Nicolas Theodorou (to AEP Paphos) |
| 23 | FW | CYP | Michalis Sykas (to AEP Paphos) |
| — | MF | CYP | Christos Nicolaou (to AEP Paphos) |
| 28 | MF | CYP | Rafael Yiangoudakis (to Enosis Neon Parekklisia) |

==== Olympiakos Nicosia ====
In: Note: Flags indicate national team as defined under FIFA eligibility rules; some limited exceptions apply. Players may hold more than one non-FIFA nationality.

| No. | Pos. | Nation | Player |
|---|---|---|---|
| 25 | FW | CYP | Diogenis Sergidis (from APOEL U21) |
| 16 | FW | CYP | Andreas Nicolaou (from Apollon Limassol U21) |
| 6 | DF | CYP | Stavros Zevlaris (from AC Omonia U21) |
| 30 | FW | CYP | Giannos Ioannou (from AC Omonia U21) |
| 20 | FW | CYP | Fanos Evangelou (from Digenis Morphou) |
| 27 | DF | CYP | Andreas Themistokleous (from APOEL U21) |
| 7 | MF | CYP | Pantelis Vasiliou (from APOEL U21) |
| 12 | FW | CYP | Kyriacos Vasiliou (from APOEL U21) |
| 40 | MF | CYP | Markos Charalambous (on loan from APOEL) |
| 23 | FW | GHA | Godfred Bekoe (free agent) |
| 19 | MF | COM | Nakibou Aboubakari (from (France) EA Guingamp B) |

Out: Note: Flags indicate national team as defined under FIFA eligibility rules; some limited exceptions apply. Players may hold more than one non-FIFA nationality.

| No. | Pos. | Nation | Player |
|---|---|---|---|
| 24 | MF | CIV | Lamine N'Dao (loan return to Doxa Katokopias) |
| 45 | MF | CYP | Emilios Panayiotou (loan return to APOEL) |
| 4 | DF | RUS | Boris Rotenberg (loan return to (Russia) Dynamo Moscow) |
| 18 | FW | CYP | Marcos Michael (loan return to Anorthosis Famagusta) |
| 13 | DF | CPV | Paulo Pina (to Ermis Aradippou) |
| 73 | FW | ITA | Gaetano Monachello (to (France) AS Monaco) |
| 10 | MF | POR | Hélder Castro (to AEK Larnaca) |
| 9 | FW | POR | Henrique (to Ermis Aradippou) |
| 7 | MF | AUS | Robert Stambolziev (to AEK Kouklia) |
| 23 | MF | MLI | Mamadou Djikiné (released) |
| 35 | DF | NGA | Jamiu Alimi (released) |
| 1 | GK | POL | Paweł Kapsa (to (Azerbaijan) Simurq) |
| 2 | DF | ESP | Manolo Gaspar (to (Spain) El Palo) |
| 33 | DF | CYP | Giorgos Pelagias (to (Azerbaijan) Baku FC) |

==== Omonia Aradippou ====
In: Note: Flags indicate national team as defined under FIFA eligibility rules; some limited exceptions apply. Players may hold more than one non-FIFA nationality.

| No. | Pos. | Nation | Player |
|---|---|---|---|
| 11 | FW | CYP | Constantinos Constantinou (from PAEEK FC) |
| 5 | MF | CYP | Kyriacos Stylianou (from Othellos Athienou) |
| 19 | FW | CYP | Andreas Alcibiades (from PAEEK FC) |
| 9 | FW | CYP | Demos Demosthenous (from Othellos Athienou) |
| 8 | MF | CYP | Christodoulos Kountouretis (from Ermis Aradippou) |

Out: Note: Flags indicate national team as defined under FIFA eligibility rules; some limited exceptions apply. Players may hold more than one non-FIFA nationality.

| No. | Pos. | Nation | Player |
|---|---|---|---|
| 14 | DF | CYP | Nicolas Katsouris (to Digenis Oroklinis) |
| 15 | FW | CYP | Constantinos Mintikkis (to Nea Salamina) |
| 23 | DF | CYP | Alexis Theocharous (to Elpida Xylofagou) |
| 27 | DF | CYP | Sergis Avraam (to Elpida Xylofagou) |
| 8 | MF | CYP | Kyriacos Apostolou (to Anagennisi Dherynia) |
| 12 | DF | CYP | Kyriacos Kyriacou (to Anagennisi Dherynia) |
| 29 | FW | CYP | Marinos Andreou (to Onisilos Sotira) |
| 33 | FW | CYP | Petros Filaniotis (to Digenis Morphou) |

==== Othellos Athienou ====
In: Note: Flags indicate national team as defined under FIFA eligibility rules; some limited exceptions apply. Players may hold more than one non-FIFA nationality.

| No. | Pos. | Nation | Player |
|---|---|---|---|
| 78 | FW | POR | Ângelo (from AEK Kouklia) |
| 77 | DF | CYP | Panayiotis Panayiotou (from PAEEK FC) |
| 7 | MF | CYP | Nicos Pieri (from ASIL) |
| 22 | GK | POL | Maciej Zając (from Anagennisi Dherynia) |
| 11 | DF | HUN | Lajos Terjék (from Ermis Aradippou) |
| 5 | DF | CYP | Orthodoxos Ioannou (from Ermis Aradippou) |
| 19 | FW | CYP | Giorgos Loizou (from Onisilos Sotiras) |
| 10 | MF | TUN | Mohamed Sassi (from (France) FC Mantes) |
| 13 | MF | POR | Moisés (from (Albania) Gramshi) |
| 26 | DF | GRE | Stavros Nicolaou (from Ermis Aradippou) |
| 16 | DF | ALB | Kostandin Ndoni (on loan from Nea Salamina) |
| 3 | DF | CYP | Nicos Efthimiou (on loan from Anorthosis Famagusta) |

Out: Note: Flags indicate national team as defined under FIFA eligibility rules; some limited exceptions apply. Players may hold more than one non-FIFA nationality.

| No. | Pos. | Nation | Player |
|---|---|---|---|
| 34 | DF | CYP | Nicos Efthimiou (loan return to Anorthosis Famagusta) |
| 7 | MF | CYP | Nicolas Manoli (to Ayia Napa) |
| 12 | MF | CYP | Kyriacos Stylianou (to Omonia Aradippou) |
| 14 | DF | CYP | Petros Messios (to Ayia Napa) |
| 3 | DF | CYP | Panayiotis Dionysiou (to Onisilos Sotira) |
| 1 | GK | SVK | Peter Kostolani (released) |
| 32 | GK | CYP | Fredy Tarwireyi (released) |
| 47 | FW | LVA | Aleksejs Koļesņikovs (to (Poland) Stal Rzeszow) |
| 10 | MF | GRE | Spyros Kontopoulos (to MEAP Nisou) |
| 18 | DF | POL | Tomasz Czępiński (to (Poland) Avia Świdnik) |
| 9 | FW | CYP | Demos Demosthenous (to Omonia Aradippou) |
| 11 | FW | CYP | Chrysostomos Chrysostomou (to Onisilos Sotira) |
| 44 | DF | CYP | Andreas Chimonas (to Digenis Oroklinis) |
| 19 | FW | CYP | Tziovanis Siepis (to Digenis Oroklinis) |
| 80 | DF | CYP | Marios Pochouzouris (to ENTHOI Lakatamia) |

=== B2 Division ===
==== AEZ Zakakiou ====
In: Note: Flags indicate national team as defined under FIFA eligibility rules; some limited exceptions apply. Players may hold more than one non-FIFA nationality.

| No. | Pos. | Nation | Player |
|---|---|---|---|
| 77 | MF | GRE | Christos Oxyzoglou (free agent) |
| 44 | DF | CYP | Marios Christou (from Konstantios & Evripidis Trachoniou) |
| 7 | FW | CYP | Grigoris Orthodoxou (from Enosis Neon Parekklisia) |
| — | DF | CYP | Spyros Christoforou (from Konstantios & Evripidis Trachoniou) |
| 10 | MF | CYP | Marinos Georgiou (from Konstantios & Evripidis Trachoniou) |
| 12 | FW | CYP | Marios Gruny (from Enosis Neon Parekklisia) |
| 1 | GK | CYP | Michalis Kokkinos (from Enosis Neon Parekklisia) |
| 88 | MF | CYP | Andreas Fotiou (free agent) |
| — | DF | CYP | Andreas Iakovou (free agent) |
| 8 | DF | CYP | Giannis Demetriou (from Enosis Neon Parekklisia) |
| 2 | MF | CYP | Demos Sokratous (from AEK Kouklia) |

Out: Note: Flags indicate national team as defined under FIFA eligibility rules; some limited exceptions apply. Players may hold more than one non-FIFA nationality.

| No. | Pos. | Nation | Player |
|---|---|---|---|
| 10 | MF | GRE | Panagiotis Linardos (to Anorthosis Famagusta) |
| 1 | GK | CYP | Giorgos Charalambous (released) |
| 5 | MF | CYP | Pieris Iosif (to Konstantios & Evripidis Trachoniou) |
| 20 | MF | CYP | Efthymios Panayiotou (released) |
| 9 | FW | CYP | Stefanos Poullis (released) |
| 8 | MF | CYP | Constantinos Kissonergis (to Amathous Agiou Tychona) |
| 7 | MF | CYP | Nicolas Kanetis (to Enosis Neon Parekklisia) |
| 11 | DF | CYP | Antonis Antoniou (released) |
| — | DF | CYP | Angelos Ioannou (released) |
| 21 | DF | CYP | Panayiotis Foklas (to APEP) |
| 12 | GK | CYP | Giorgos Loizou (to Chalkanoras Idaliou) |
| 31 | MF | GHA | Yaw Rush (released) |
| 17 | FW | SLE | Allie Andrew (released) |
| 15 | DF | CYP | Elvis Kryukov (to Karmiotissa Polemidion) |

==== ASIL Lysi ====
In: Note: Flags indicate national team as defined under FIFA eligibility rules; some limited exceptions apply. Players may hold more than one non-FIFA nationality.

| No. | Pos. | Nation | Player |
|---|---|---|---|
| 9 | FW | CYP | Theodoros Panagi (from Leivadiakos-Salamina Leivadion) |
| 22 | DF | ROU | Sorin Chirciu (free agent) |
| 7 | MF | CYP | Adamos Hadjigeorgiou (on loan from Anorthosis Famagusta) |

Out: Note: Flags indicate national team as defined under FIFA eligibility rules; some limited exceptions apply. Players may hold more than one non-FIFA nationality.

| No. | Pos. | Nation | Player |
|---|---|---|---|
| — | MF | CYP | Nicos Pieri (to Othellos Athienou) |

==== Chalkanoras Idaliou ====
In: Note: Flags indicate national team as defined under FIFA eligibility rules; some limited exceptions apply. Players may hold more than one non-FIFA nationality.

| No. | Pos. | Nation | Player |
|---|---|---|---|
| 17 | FW | CYP | Theodosis Kyprou (from Omonia) |
| 1 | GK | CYP | Giorgos Loizou (from AEZ Zakakiou) |
| 14 | DF | CYP | Sotiris Ptinis (from Ethnikos Latsion FC) |
| 6 | DF | CYP | Chyrsovalantis Panayiotou (from Ethnikos Assia) |
| 2 | DF | CYP | Nestoras Tzepras (from MEAP Nisou) |
| 21 | MF | CYP | Stefanos Chrysos (free agent) |
| 22 | DF | CYP | Loizos Solonos (from Ethnikos Assia) |

Out: Note: Flags indicate national team as defined under FIFA eligibility rules; some limited exceptions apply. Players may hold more than one non-FIFA nationality.

| No. | Pos. | Nation | Player |
|---|---|---|---|
| 24 | GK | CYP | Gavriel Constantinou (loan return to Anorthosis Famagusta) |
| 32 | FW | CYP | Theodosis Kyprou (loan return to Omonia) |
| 2 | DF | CYP | Giorgos Costa (released) |
| 6 | MF | CYP | Theodoros Katsiaris (released) |
| 9 | FW | CYP | Chrysovalantis Kapartis (to ENTHOI Lakatamia) |
| 4 | DF | CYP | Panayiotis Frantzeskou (to Ethnikos Achna) |
| 8 | MF | MDA | Roman Bolbocian (to Ethnikos Assia) |

==== Digenis Voroklinis ====
In: Note: Flags indicate national team as defined under FIFA eligibility rules; some limited exceptions apply. Players may hold more than one non-FIFA nationality.

| No. | Pos. | Nation | Player |
|---|---|---|---|
| 14 | DF | CYP | Nicolas Katsouris (from Omonia Aradippou) |
| 8 | MF | CYP | Pantelis Tavrou (from PO Xylotymbou) |
| 1 | GK | BUL | Vladislav Mitev (from (Bulgaria) Chavdar Etropole) |
| 44 | DF | CYP | Andreas Chimonas (from Othellos Athienou) |
| 9 | FW | CYP | Tziovanis Siepis (from Othellos Athienou) |
| 22 | MF | NGA | David Ikechukwu Opara (from Karmiotissa Polemidion) |

Out: Note: Flags indicate national team as defined under FIFA eligibility rules; some limited exceptions apply. Players may hold more than one non-FIFA nationality.

| No. | Pos. | Nation | Player |
|---|---|---|---|
| — | FW | CYP | Kyriacos Hadjaros (released) |
| — | FW | FRA | Ritchie Zanga (released) |
| — | FW | COD | Egola Empela (released) |

==== Enosis Neon Parekklisia ====
In: Note: Flags indicate national team as defined under FIFA eligibility rules; some limited exceptions apply. Players may hold more than one non-FIFA nationality.

| No. | Pos. | Nation | Player |
|---|---|---|---|
| 1 | GK | CYP | Andreas Theodorou (from ENAD Polis Chrysochous) |
| 9 | FW | CYP | Demetris Kardanas (from Amathous Agiou Tychona) |
| 13 | DF | CYP | Constantinos Alexandrou (free agent) |
| 23 | FW | CYP | Marios Pastellis (from Konstantios & Evripidis Trachoniou) |
| 2 | FW | CYP | Nicos Kannetis (from AEZ Zakakiou) |
| 28 | MF | CYP | Rafael Yiangoudakis (from Nikos & Sokratis Erimis) |

Out: Note: Flags indicate national team as defined under FIFA eligibility rules; some limited exceptions apply. Players may hold more than one non-FIFA nationality.

| No. | Pos. | Nation | Player |
|---|---|---|---|
| 10 | MF | CYP | Neophytos Chrysostomou (loan return to Aris Limassol) |
| 13 | FW | CYP | Nicolas Vitorović (to Amathous Agiou Tychona) |
| — | FW | CYP | Grigoris Orthodoxou (to AEZ Zakakiou) |
| 12 | FW | CYP | Marios Gruny (to AEZ Zakakiou) |
| 1 | GK | CYP | Michalis Kokkinos (to AEZ Zakakiou) |
| 4 | MF | CYP | Pantelis Pitsillos (to Ermis Aradippou) |
| 2 | DF | CYP | Giannis Demetriou (to AEZ Zakakiou) |

==== Karmiotissa Polemidion ====
In: Note: Flags indicate national team as defined under FIFA eligibility rules; some limited exceptions apply. Players may hold more than one non-FIFA nationality.

| No. | Pos. | Nation | Player |
|---|---|---|---|
| 20 | MF | CYP | Liasos Louka (from AEK Kouklia) |
| 23 | DF | CYP | Elvis Kryukov (from AEZ Zakakiou) |
| 9 | FW | CYP | Giorgos Neophytou (from APEP) |
| 92 | MF | GRE | Angelos Pournos (on loan from Nea Salamina) |

Out: Note: Flags indicate national team as defined under FIFA eligibility rules; some limited exceptions apply. Players may hold more than one non-FIFA nationality.

| No. | Pos. | Nation | Player |
|---|---|---|---|
| — | DF | CYP | Nicolas Fysentzidis (released) |
| — | MF | CYP | Andreas Ioannou (released) |
| — | MF | NGA | David Ikechukwu Opara (to Digenis Voroklinis) |
| — | FW | NED | Dion Esajas (to ENAD Polis Chrysochous) |

==== Onisilos Sotira ====
In: Note: Flags indicate national team as defined under FIFA eligibility rules; some limited exceptions apply. Players may hold more than one non-FIFA nationality.

| No. | Pos. | Nation | Player |
|---|---|---|---|
| 4 | DF | CYP | Panayiotis Dionysiou (from Othellos Athienou) |
| 11 | FW | CYP | Chrysostomos Chrysostomou (from Othellos Athienou) |
| 31 | MF | POR | Jorge Tavares (from Benfica Macau) |
| 30 | MF | CYP | Charis Loizou (from Ermis Aradippou) |
| 9 | FW | ZIM | Edward Mashinya (from Ethnikos Achna) |
| 7 | FW | CYP | Marinos Andreou (from Omonia Aradippou) |

Out: Note: Flags indicate national team as defined under FIFA eligibility rules; some limited exceptions apply. Players may hold more than one non-FIFA nationality.

| No. | Pos. | Nation | Player |
|---|---|---|---|
| 24 | DF | CYP | Ioannis Antoniou (to Ayia Napa) |
| 8 | FW | CYP | Marios Zannetou (to Enosis Neon Paralimni) |
| 5 | DF | CYP | Antonis Moushis (to Ayia Napa) |
| 6 | DF | CYP | Panayiotis Kosma (to Elpida Xylofagou) |
| 10 | FW | CYP | Andreas Zannetou (to Achyronas Liopetriou) |
| 33 | MF | CYP | Vasilis Papageorgiou (to PAEEK FC) |

==== PAEEK FC ====
In: Note: Flags indicate national team as defined under FIFA eligibility rules; some limited exceptions apply. Players may hold more than one non-FIFA nationality.

| No. | Pos. | Nation | Player |
|---|---|---|---|
| 8 | FW | COD | Serge Makofo (from (England) Havant & Waterlooville) |
| 6 | MF | GHA | Maxwell Ankomah (from Arion Futsal) |
| 1 | GK | CYP | Giorgos Kakoullis (from Ethnikos Latsion FC) |
| 2 | DF | CYP | Stavros Stavrou (from Digenis Morphou) |
| 3 | MF | CYP | Vasilis Papageorgiou (from Onisilos Sotira) |
| 11 | FW | CYP | Vasilis Andreou (from Ethnikos Latsion FC) |
| 19 | FW | CYP | Marios Pechlivanis (from Ethnikos Assia) |
| 33 | GK | CYP | Marios Christoforou (free agent) |
| 21 | DF | CYP | Demosthenis Georgiades (from Olympiakos Nicosia U21) |
| 77 | FW | POR | Bruno Luz (on loan from Ermis Aradippou) |

Out: Note: Flags indicate national team as defined under FIFA eligibility rules; some limited exceptions apply. Players may hold more than one non-FIFA nationality.

| No. | Pos. | Nation | Player |
|---|---|---|---|
| 21 | FW | CYP | Constantinos Constantinou (to Omonia Aradippou) |
| 46 | MF | CPV | Spencer (to Ayia Napa) |
| 3 | DF | GRE | Giorgos Vidalis (to (Greece) Episkopi) |
| 41 | GK | CYP | Kyriacos Ioannou (to Ethnikos Achna) |
| 19 | FW | CYP | Andreas Alcibiades (to Omonia Aradippou) |
| 2 | DF | CYP | Panayiotis Panayiotou (to Othellos Athienou) |
| 40 | MF | CYP | Giorgos Economides (to Doxa Katokopias) |
| — | DF | CYP | Pantelis Konomis (to Alki Larnaca) |
| 99 | FW | ITA | Harley Bernardi (released) |
| 1 | GK | GRE | Alexandros Paschalakis (released) |
| 5 | DF | GRE | Panayiotis Zonas (released) |
| 6 | MF | FRA | Sami Cauty (released) |
| 7 | FW | GRE | Christos Kanellopoulos (released) |
| 10 | MF | SVN | Miroslav Grbić (to (Finland) OPS) |

== See also ==
- (India) I-League transfers for the 2013–14 season
- (Bulgaria) List of Bulgarian football transfers summer 2013
- (Netherlands) List of Dutch football transfers summer 2013
- (England) List of English football transfers summer 2013
- (Malta) List of Maltese football transfers summer 2013
- (Germany) List of German football transfers summer 2013
- (Greece) List of Greek football transfers summer 2013
- (Portugal) List of Portuguese football transfers summer 2013
- (Spain) List of Spanish football transfers summer 2013
- (Latvia) List of Latvian football transfers summer 2013
- (Serbia) List of Serbian football transfers summer 2013
