= List of Cypriot football transfers winter 2016–17 =

This is a list of Cypriot football transfers for the 2016–17 winter transfer window by club. Only transfers of clubs in the Cypriot First Division and Cypriot Second Division are included.

The winter transfer window will open on 1 January 2017, although a few transfers took place prior to that date. The window will close at midnight on 1 February 2017. Players without a club may join one at any time, either during or in between transfer windows.

== Cypriot First Division ==
=== AEK Larnaca ===
In: Note: Flags indicate national team as defined under FIFA eligibility rules; some limited exceptions apply. Players may hold more than one non-FIFA nationality.

No.	Pos.	Nation	Player
22	FW	CRO	Elvir Maloku (on loan from (Spain) Gimnàstic de Tarragona)
13	MF	NED	Hector Hevel (from (Netherlands) ADO Den Haag)
23	FW	FRA	Florian Taulemesse (from (Belgium) K.A.S. Eupen)
—	FW	CYP	Nestoras Mitidis (on loan from (Netherlands) Roda JC Kerkrade)
—	GK	POL	Mateusz Taudul (loan return from AEZ Zakakiou)

Out: Note: Flags indicate national team as defined under FIFA eligibility rules; some limited exceptions apply. Players may hold more than one non-FIFA nationality.

No.	Pos.	Nation	Player
9	FW	BRA	André Alves (to Anorthosis Famagusta)
21	FW	CYP	Nikos Englezou (on loan to Nea Salamis Famagusta)

=== AEL Limassol ===
In: Note: Flags indicate national team as defined under FIFA eligibility rules; some limited exceptions apply. Players may hold more than one non-FIFA nationality.

No.	Pos.	Nation	Player
22	FW	TUN	Ismail Sassi (from AEZ Zakakiou)
77	FW	ESP	Piti (from (Spain) Rayo Vallecano)
90	MF	ESP	Alain Eizmendi (from (Spain) Real Unión)
90	DF	ROU	Bogdan Mitrea (from (Italy) Ascoli Picchio F.C. 1898)

Out: Note: Flags indicate national team as defined under FIFA eligibility rules; some limited exceptions apply. Players may hold more than one non-FIFA nationality.

No.	Pos.	Nation	Player
4	DF	CYP	Valentinos Sielis (to (South Korea) Gangwon)
5	MF	CPV	Babanco (to (Portugal) Feirense)
7	MF	HAI	Emmanuel Sarki (released)
9	FW	ANG	Aguinaldo (to (Portugal) Gil Vicente)
83	MF	BRA	Danilo Bueno (released)

=== AEZ Zakakiou ===
In: Note: Flags indicate national team as defined under FIFA eligibility rules; some limited exceptions apply. Players may hold more than one non-FIFA nationality.

No.	Pos.	Nation	Player
91	FW	CRO	Vilim Posinkovic (from (Greece) Aiginiakos)
6	MF	CYP	Sergios Panayiotou (from Ayia Napa)
70	MF	CYP	Emilios Panayiotou (free agent)
2	DF	CYP	Andreas Christou (from Ayia Napa)

Out: Note: Flags indicate national team as defined under FIFA eligibility rules; some limited exceptions apply. Players may hold more than one non-FIFA nationality.

No.	Pos.	Nation	Player
7	MF	TUN	Ismail Sassi (to AEL Limassol)
8	DF	BRA	Marco Aurélio (to Aris Limassol)
9	FW	CYP	Andreas Pittaras (to ASIL Lysi)
10	MF	ARG	Nicolás Villafañe (to (Venezuela) Estudiantes de Mérida)
11	MF	CYP	Yiannis Pachipis (to Olympiakos Nicosia)
23	FW	GRE	Konstantinos Pangalos (to (Greece) OFI Crete)

=== Anagennisi Deryneia ===
In: Note: Flags indicate national team as defined under FIFA eligibility rules; some limited exceptions apply. Players may hold more than one non-FIFA nationality.

No.	Pos.	Nation	Player

Out: Note: Flags indicate national team as defined under FIFA eligibility rules; some limited exceptions apply. Players may hold more than one non-FIFA nationality.

No.	Pos.	Nation	Player
19	DF	GRE	Nikos Barboudis (to Ayia Napa)
22	MF	ARM	Artur Yuspashyan (released)
54	GK	POR	Jorge Vieira (released)

=== Anorthosis Famagusta ===
In: Note: Flags indicate national team as defined under FIFA eligibility rules; some limited exceptions apply. Players may hold more than one non-FIFA nationality.

No.	Pos.	Nation	Player
—	DF	GRE	Dimitris Giannoulis (on loan from PAOK)

Out: Note: Flags indicate national team as defined under FIFA eligibility rules; some limited exceptions apply. Players may hold more than one non-FIFA nationality.

No.	Pos.	Nation	Player
11	MF	ESP	José Antonio Ríos (released)

=== APOEL ===
In: Note: Flags indicate national team as defined under FIFA eligibility rules; some limited exceptions apply. Players may hold more than one non-FIFA nationality.

No.	Pos.	Nation	Player
6	MF	NED	Lorenzo Ebecilio (from (Russia) Anzhi Makhachkala)
17	FW	ESP	David Barral (from (Spain) Granada)
80	MF	COL	Roger Cañas (on loan from (Kazakhstan) Astana)
90	DF	CTA	Cédric Yambéré (on loan from (France) Bordeaux)

Out: Note: Flags indicate national team as defined under FIFA eligibility rules; some limited exceptions apply. Players may hold more than one non-FIFA nationality.

No.	Pos.	Nation	Player
5	DF	BRA	Carlão (to (Italy) Torino)
8	MF	ESP	Andrea Orlandi (to (Italy) Novara)
14	MF	ALB	Qazim Laçi (loan return to (Greece) Olympiacos)
27	FW	POL	Mateusz Piątkowski (to (Poland) Wisła Płock)
28	DF	POR	Mário Sérgio (to Apollon Limassol)
88	MF	BLR	Renan Bressan (to (Portugal) G.D. Chaves)

=== Apollon Limassol ===
In: Note: Flags indicate national team as defined under FIFA eligibility rules; some limited exceptions apply. Players may hold more than one non-FIFA nationality.

No.	Pos.	Nation	Player
8	DF	POR	Mário Sérgio (from APOEL)
66	MF	CPV	Sérgio Semedo (from (Portugal) Feirense)

Out: Note: Flags indicate national team as defined under FIFA eligibility rules; some limited exceptions apply. Players may hold more than one non-FIFA nationality.

No.	Pos.	Nation	Player
3	DF	POR	Nuno Lopes (released)
11	MF	ARG	Alejandro Barbaro (on loan to Karmiotissa)

=== Aris Limassol ===
In: Note: Flags indicate national team as defined under FIFA eligibility rules; some limited exceptions apply. Players may hold more than one non-FIFA nationality.

No.	Pos.	Nation	Player
—	DF	BRA	Marco Aurélio (from AEZ Zakakiou)
—	MF	CYP	Kyriacos Pavlou (from Nea Salamina)
—	DF	SWE	Rasmus Sjöstedt (from (Sweden) Falkenberg)

Out: Note: Flags indicate national team as defined under FIFA eligibility rules; some limited exceptions apply. Players may hold more than one non-FIFA nationality.

No.	Pos.	Nation	Player
7	MF	ARG	Mariano Berriex (released)
93	FW	FRA	Donneil Moukanza (released)

=== Doxa Katokopias ===
In: Note: Flags indicate national team as defined under FIFA eligibility rules; some limited exceptions apply. Players may hold more than one non-FIFA nationality.

No.	Pos.	Nation	Player
4	MF	ESP	Emilio Sánchez (from (Spain) Llagostera)
18	FW	ESP	Braulio Nóbrega (from (Spain) Caudal)
23	FW	ESP	Ferran Corominas (from (Spain) Mallorca)
93	MF	FRA	Hérold Goulon (from (Romania) Viitorul Constanța)

Out: Note: Flags indicate national team as defined under FIFA eligibility rules; some limited exceptions apply. Players may hold more than one non-FIFA nationality.

No.	Pos.	Nation	Player
3	MF	CYP	Stelios Demetriou (to (Scotland) St Mirren)
10	MF	ESP	Carles Coto (to Ermis Aradippou)

=== Ermis Aradippou ===
In: Note: Flags indicate national team as defined under FIFA eligibility rules; some limited exceptions apply. Players may hold more than one non-FIFA nationality.

No.	Pos.	Nation	Player
—	MF	CYP	Dimitris Froxylias (from Nea Salamina)
—	MF	ESP	Carles Coto (from Doxa Katokopias)

Out: Note: Flags indicate national team as defined under FIFA eligibility rules; some limited exceptions apply. Players may hold more than one non-FIFA nationality.

No.	Pos.	Nation	Player
16	DF	ROU	Cristian Sîrghi (released)

=== Ethnikos Achna ===
In: Note: Flags indicate national team as defined under FIFA eligibility rules; some limited exceptions apply. Players may hold more than one non-FIFA nationality.

No.	Pos.	Nation	Player

Out: Note: Flags indicate national team as defined under FIFA eligibility rules; some limited exceptions apply. Players may hold more than one non-FIFA nationality.

No.	Pos.	Nation	Player

=== Karmiotissa Pano Polemidion ===
In: Note: Flags indicate national team as defined under FIFA eligibility rules; some limited exceptions apply. Players may hold more than one non-FIFA nationality.

No.	Pos.	Nation	Player
--	MF	ARG	Alejandro Barbaro (on loan from Apollon Limassol)

Out: Note: Flags indicate national team as defined under FIFA eligibility rules; some limited exceptions apply. Players may hold more than one non-FIFA nationality.

No.	Pos.	Nation	Player
96	MF	GRE	Stelios Pozoglou (loan return to PAOK)
97	MF	GRE	Giannis Tsolakidis (loan return to PAOK)

=== Nea Salamina ===
In: Note: Flags indicate national team as defined under FIFA eligibility rules; some limited exceptions apply. Players may hold more than one non-FIFA nationality.

No.	Pos.	Nation	Player
—	MF	BRA	Dudú (on loan from (Greece) Asteras Tripolis)

Out: Note: Flags indicate national team as defined under FIFA eligibility rules; some limited exceptions apply. Players may hold more than one non-FIFA nationality.

No.	Pos.	Nation	Player
10	MF	CYP	Dimitris Froxylias (to Ermis Aradippou)
11	MF	CYP	Kyriacos Pavlou (to Aris Limassol)
26	DF	CYP	Christoforos Christofi (to Ayia Napa)
90	DF	ITA	Mattia Cinquini (to (Switzerland) Chiasso)

=== Omonia ===
In: Note: Flags indicate national team as defined under FIFA eligibility rules; some limited exceptions apply. Players may hold more than one non-FIFA nationality.

No.	Pos.	Nation	Player
21	DF	ISL	Kári Árnason (from (Sweden) Malmö FF)
29	MF	CIV	Stephane Aziz Ki (from (Spain) San Roque)
71	MF	NED	Nicandro Breeveld (from (United Arab Emirates) Dibba Al-Fujairah)

Out: Note: Flags indicate national team as defined under FIFA eligibility rules; some limited exceptions apply. Players may hold more than one non-FIFA nationality.

No.	Pos.	Nation	Player
5	DF	GRE	Thanasis Panteliadis (on loan to (Greece) Atromitos)
9	FW	IRL	Cillian Sheridan (to (Poland) Jagiellonia Białystok)
11	MF	ISR	Amir Agayev (to (Israel) Bnei Yehuda)

== Cypriot Second Division ==
=== Akritas Chlorakas ===
In: Note: Flags indicate national team as defined under FIFA eligibility rules; some limited exceptions apply. Players may hold more than one non-FIFA nationality.

No.	Pos.	Nation	Player

Out: Note: Flags indicate national team as defined under FIFA eligibility rules; some limited exceptions apply. Players may hold more than one non-FIFA nationality.

No.	Pos.	Nation	Player
1	GK	MSR	Corrin Brooks-Meade (to (Bulgaria) Montana)
9	FW	GRE	Taxiarchis Thanelas (to THOI Lakatamias)
81	DF	CYP	Loizos Kakoyiannis (to Enosis Neon Parekklisia)

=== Alki Oroklini ===
In: Note: Flags indicate national team as defined under FIFA eligibility rules; some limited exceptions apply. Players may hold more than one non-FIFA nationality.

No.	Pos.	Nation	Player
--	FW	FRA	Romain Davigny (free agent)

Out: Note: Flags indicate national team as defined under FIFA eligibility rules; some limited exceptions apply. Players may hold more than one non-FIFA nationality.

No.	Pos.	Nation	Player

=== ASIL ===
In: Note: Flags indicate national team as defined under FIFA eligibility rules; some limited exceptions apply. Players may hold more than one non-FIFA nationality.

No.	Pos.	Nation	Player
—	FW	CYP	Andreas Pittaras (from AEZ Zakakiou)
—	DF	CYP	Constantinos Kastanas (from Othellos Athienou)

Out: Note: Flags indicate national team as defined under FIFA eligibility rules; some limited exceptions apply. Players may hold more than one non-FIFA nationality.

No.	Pos.	Nation	Player

=== Ayia Napa ===
In: Note: Flags indicate national team as defined under FIFA eligibility rules; some limited exceptions apply. Players may hold more than one non-FIFA nationality.

No.	Pos.	Nation	Player
—	DF	CYP	Christoforos Christofi (from Nea Salamina)
—	DF	GRE	Nikos Barboudis (from Ayia Napa)

Out: Note: Flags indicate national team as defined under FIFA eligibility rules; some limited exceptions apply. Players may hold more than one non-FIFA nationality.

No.	Pos.	Nation	Player
99	FW	ZIM	Musa Mguni (to Omonia Aradippou)

=== ENAD Polis Chrysochous FC ===
In: Note: Flags indicate national team as defined under FIFA eligibility rules; some limited exceptions apply. Players may hold more than one non-FIFA nationality.

No.	Pos.	Nation	Player

Out: Note: Flags indicate national team as defined under FIFA eligibility rules; some limited exceptions apply. Players may hold more than one non-FIFA nationality.

No.	Pos.	Nation	Player

=== Enosis Neon Paralimni ===
In: Note: Flags indicate national team as defined under FIFA eligibility rules; some limited exceptions apply. Players may hold more than one non-FIFA nationality.

No.	Pos.	Nation	Player
—	FW	GRE	Thomas Tsitas (from PAEEK)

Out: Note: Flags indicate national team as defined under FIFA eligibility rules; some limited exceptions apply. Players may hold more than one non-FIFA nationality.

No.	Pos.	Nation	Player

=== Enosis Neon Parekklisia ===
In: Note: Flags indicate national team as defined under FIFA eligibility rules; some limited exceptions apply. Players may hold more than one non-FIFA nationality.

No.	Pos.	Nation	Player
—	DF	CYP	Loizos Kakoyiannis (from Akritas Chlorakas)

Out: Note: Flags indicate national team as defined under FIFA eligibility rules; some limited exceptions apply. Players may hold more than one non-FIFA nationality.

No.	Pos.	Nation	Player

=== Ethnikos Assia ===
In: Note: Flags indicate national team as defined under FIFA eligibility rules; some limited exceptions apply. Players may hold more than one non-FIFA nationality.

No.	Pos.	Nation	Player

Out: Note: Flags indicate national team as defined under FIFA eligibility rules; some limited exceptions apply. Players may hold more than one non-FIFA nationality.

No.	Pos.	Nation	Player

=== Olympiakos Nicosia ===
In: Note: Flags indicate national team as defined under FIFA eligibility rules; some limited exceptions apply. Players may hold more than one non-FIFA nationality.

No.	Pos.	Nation	Player
91	FW	CYP	Chrysovalantis Kapartis (from PAEEK)
30	MF	CYP	Yiannis Pachipis (from AEZ Zakakiou)

Out: Note: Flags indicate national team as defined under FIFA eligibility rules; some limited exceptions apply. Players may hold more than one non-FIFA nationality.

No.	Pos.	Nation	Player
26	DF	CPV	Paulo Pina (to Ermis Aradippou)
99	FW	GHA	Samuel Nii Noye Narh (released)
—	FW	GRE	Zinon Pitsiavas (released)
44	DF	CYP	James Alexandrou (released)
20	FW	ALB	Ardit Prendi (released)

=== Omonia Aradippou ===
In: Note: Flags indicate national team as defined under FIFA eligibility rules; some limited exceptions apply. Players may hold more than one non-FIFA nationality.

No.	Pos.	Nation	Player
70	FW	ZIM	Musa Mguni (from Ayia Napa)

Out: Note: Flags indicate national team as defined under FIFA eligibility rules; some limited exceptions apply. Players may hold more than one non-FIFA nationality.

No.	Pos.	Nation	Player

=== Othellos Athienou FC ===
In: Note: Flags indicate national team as defined under FIFA eligibility rules; some limited exceptions apply. Players may hold more than one non-FIFA nationality.

No.	Pos.	Nation	Player

Out: Note: Flags indicate national team as defined under FIFA eligibility rules; some limited exceptions apply. Players may hold more than one non-FIFA nationality.

No.	Pos.	Nation	Player
15	DF	CYP	Constantinos Kastanas (to ASIL Lysi)

=== PAEEK ===
In: Note: Flags indicate national team as defined under FIFA eligibility rules; some limited exceptions apply. Players may hold more than one non-FIFA nationality.

No.	Pos.	Nation	Player

Out: Note: Flags indicate national team as defined under FIFA eligibility rules; some limited exceptions apply. Players may hold more than one non-FIFA nationality.

No.	Pos.	Nation	Player
9	FW	GRE	Thomas Tsitas (to Enosis Neon Paralimni)
19	FW	GRE	Chrysovalantis Kapartis (to Olympiakos Nicosia)

=== Pafos FC ===
In: Note: Flags indicate national team as defined under FIFA eligibility rules; some limited exceptions apply. Players may hold more than one non-FIFA nationality.

No.	Pos.	Nation	Player

Out: Note: Flags indicate national team as defined under FIFA eligibility rules; some limited exceptions apply. Players may hold more than one non-FIFA nationality.

No.	Pos.	Nation	Player

=== ENTHOI Lakatamia FC ===
In: Note: Flags indicate national team as defined under FIFA eligibility rules; some limited exceptions apply. Players may hold more than one non-FIFA nationality.

No.	Pos.	Nation	Player
—	FW	GRE	Taxiarchis Thanelas (from Akritas Chlorakas)

Out: Note: Flags indicate national team as defined under FIFA eligibility rules; some limited exceptions apply. Players may hold more than one non-FIFA nationality.

No.	Pos.	Nation	Player
