= Miguel Tavares (footballer, born 1999) =

Portuguese footballer

Personal information
- Full name: Miguel Lamego Tavares
- Date of birth: 29 January 1999 (age 27)
- Place of birth: Vila Nova de Gaia, Portugal
- Height: 1.88 m (6 ft 2 in)
- Position: Winger

Team information
- Current team: Panionios
- Number: 90

Youth career
- –2010: Candal
- 2010–2011: Estarreja
- 2011–2012: Porto
- 2012–2016: Coimbrões
- 2016–2018: União Nogueirense

Senior career*
Years	Team	Apps	(Gls)
2018–2021	União Nogueirense	59	(20)
2021–2022	Amarante	22	(12)
2022–2024	Panathinaikos B	22	(4)
2024–2026	Panathinaikos	0	(0)
2024–2025	→ Makedonikos (loan)	15	(3)
2025	→ Panachaiki (loan)	8	(5)
2026	→ A.E. Kifisia (loan)	9	(0)
2026–	Panionios	3	(1)
- * Club domestic league appearances and goals as of 19 September 2026

Miguel Lamego Tavares (born 29 January 1999) is a Portuguese professional footballer who plays as a winger for Super League Greece 2 club Panionios.

== Career ==
He represented various clubs at the youth level, with Porto being the most notable. Tavares broke into senior football with União Nogueirense in 2018. In August 2022, Tavares joined Super League Greece 2 side Panathinaikos B on a one-year deal from Amarante.

On 7 November 2022, he made his professional debut starting in a 5–2 win over Apollon Larissa. He later suffered a hamstring injury that month. In May 2023, he signed with the club through 2027.

On 12 January 2026, Tavares joined fellow Super League Greece side Kifisia on loan until the end of the season.

On 13 August 2026, Tavares signed for Panionios on a free transfer.

== Career statistics ==
As of 16 August 2026

Appearances and goals by club, season and competition
Club	Season	League			Cup		Continental		Other		Total	
Club	Season	Division	Apps	Goals	Apps	Goals	Apps	Goals	Apps	Goals	Apps	Goals
União Nogueirense	2018–19	AF Porto Honour Division	17	8	—		—		—		17	8
União Nogueirense	2019–20	AF Porto Elite Division	25	8	—		—		1	1	26	9
União Nogueirense	2020–21	AF Porto Elite Division	17	4	—		—		—		17	4
União Nogueirense	Total		59	20	0	0	0	0	1	1	60	21
Amarante	2021–22	Campeonato de Portugal	22	12	1	1	—		—		23	13
Panathinaikos B	2022–23	Super League Greece 2	18	3	—		—		—		18	3
Panathinaikos B	2023–24	Super League Greece 2	4	1	—		—		—		4	1
Panathinaikos B	Total		22	4	0	0	0	0	0	0	22	4
Makedonikos (loan)	2024–25	Super League Greece 2	15	3	—		—		—		15	3
Panachaiki (loan)	2024–25	Super League Greece 2	8	5	—		—		—		8	5
Kifisia (loan)	2025–26	Super League Greece	9	0	—		—		—		9	0
Panionios	2026–27	Super League Greece 2					—		—			
Career total			135	44	1	1	0	0	1	1	137	46

== Honours ==
União Nogueirense

- AF Porto Honour Division: 2018–19
