= Vitalii Doroshenko =

Ukrainian-Portuguese footballer

Personal information
- Full name: Vitalii Doroshenko
- Date of birth: 12 December 1994 (age 31)
- Place of birth: Kherson, Ukraine
- Height: 1.74 m (5 ft 9 in)
- Position: Winger

Team information
- Current team: Dragões Sandinenses

Youth career
- 2005–2007: GD Gafanha
- 2007–2009: Porto
- 2009–2012: CD Candal
- 2012–2013: União Nogueirense

Senior career*
Years	Team	Apps	(Gls)
2013–2014	Doxa Katokopias	8	(1)
2014–2015	União Nogueirense	14	(3)
2015	Olympiakos Nicosia	1	(0)
2016	União Nogueirense		
2016–2017	Valadares Gaia	10	(0)
2017–2019	Foz		
2020–	Dragões Sandinenses		
- * Club domestic league appearances and goals as of 2020

Vitalii Doroshenko (Ukrainian: Віталій Дорошенко; born 12 December 1994) is a Ukrainian-Portuguese footballer who plays for Dragões Sandinenses.

== Club career ==
Born in Kherson, in Ukraine, Doroshenko started his career in Portugal, playing for many clubs during his youth career between 2005 and 2013. Notable among the clubs was Porto. In 2013, he signed for Doxa Katokopias in Cypriot First Division. He made his debut against AEL Limassol, coming as an 86th-minute substitute for Carlitos. He scored a brace in a Cypriot Cup match against Olympiakos Nicosia. In 2015, he moved to Olympiakos Nicosia for 6 months.

== Club statistics ==
As of 26 May 2014

Club	Season	League			Cup		Other		Total	
Club	Season	Division	Apps	Goals	Apps	Goals	Apps	Goals	Apps	Goals
Doxa Katokopias	2013–14	Cypriot First Division	8	1	2	2	0	0	10	3
Career total			8	1	2	2	0	0	10	3
