= Pulpo Romero =

Spanish footballer (born 1987)

Pulpo
Personal information
- Full name: Francisco José Andrés Romero
- Date of birth: 28 October 1987 (age 39)
- Place of birth: Albacete, Spain
- Height: 1.85 m (6 ft 1 in)
- Position: Goalkeeper

Youth career
- Albacete

Senior career*
Years	Team	Apps	(Gls)
2006–2007	Atlético Tarazona		
2007–2008	Mallorca B	26	(0)
2008–2010	Murcia B	29	(0)
2010–2011	Leganés	1	(0)
2011–2012	Orihuela	11	(0)
2012–2013	Doxa	0	(0)
2012–2013	→ AEK Larnaca (loan)	4	(0)
2013–2015	AEL Limassol	31	(0)
2015	Rapid București	11	(0)
2016	Ponferradina	0	(0)
2016	→ Atlético Astorga (loan)	17	(0)
2016–2017	La Roda	30	(0)
2017–2018	Enosis Neon Paralimni	24	(0)
- * Club domestic league appearances and goals as of 31 May 2019

Francisco José Andrés Romero (born 28 October 1987), also known as Pulpo Romero or simply Pulpo, is a Spanish former professional footballer who played as a goalkeeper.

== Career ==
Born in Albacete, Castile-La Mancha, Pulpo was an Albacete Balompié youth graduate. He made his seniors debut with Atlético Tarazona in 2006, in Tercera División.

On 17 August 2008, Pulpo first arrived in Segunda División B, after joining Real Murcia Imperial. On 18 July 2010, he moved to CD Leganés, also in the third division.

Pulpo acted as a backup to Rubén Falcón during his first and only season at the Madrid side. On 16 July 2011, he signed for fellow league team Orihuela CF, again featuring sparingly.

In August 2012, Pulpo moved abroad for the first time in his career, joining Cypriot First Division side Doxa Katokopias F.C. Late in the month, he was loaned to fellow league team AEK Larnaca F.C., with Alexandre Negri moving in the opposite direction.

On 5 June 2013, Pulpo signed a one-year deal with AEL Limassol.
