= Martinos Christofi =

Cypriot footballer (born 1993)

Personal information
- Date of birth: 26 July 1993 (age 33)
- Place of birth: Limassol, Cyprus
- Height: 1.87 m (6 ft 2 in)
- Position: Defender

Team information
- Current team: Karmiotissa FC
- Number: 93

Youth career
- 2006–2013: AEL Limassol

Senior career*
| Years | Team | Apps | (Gls) |
| 2009–2013 | AEL Limassol | 4 | (0) |
| 2013–2014 | Alki | 23 | (0) |
| 2014–2018 | Ermis | 80 | (0) |
| 2018 | Karmiotissa | 5 | (0) |
| 2018–2019 | Alki Oroklini | 20 | (0) |
| 2019–2022 | Doxa Katokopias | 48 | (1) |
| 2022 | Lahti | 15 | (0) |
| 2023 | Llapi | 4 | (0) |
| 2023–2024 | Olympiakos Nicosia | 17 | (0) |
| 2024–25 | Krasava Ypsonas | 1 | (1) |
| 2025- | Karmiotissa FC | 26 | (0) |

International career^{‡}
| 2010–2011 | Cyprus U19 | 2 | (0) |
- * Club domestic league appearances and goals as of 3 May 2026 ‡ National team caps and goals as of 10 October 2010

Martinos Christofi (Greek: Μαρτίνος Χριστοφή; born 26 July 1993) is a Cypriot–professional footballer who played as a defender for Karmiotissa FC.

== Club career ==
He started his career at AEL Limassol in Cypriot First Division.

On 3 February 2022, Christofi signed with FC Lahti in Finnish Veikkausliiga.

== Personal life ==
Christofi was born in Cyprus to Cypriot father and Finnish mother from Kemi. He holds a dual Cypriot–Finnish citizenship, and is a fluent Finnish speaker.

== Club statistics ==
As of 21 December 2024

| Club | Season | League | | | Cup (Note: Includes Cypriot Cup, Suomen Cup, Finnish League Cup and Kosovar Cup) | | Total | |
| Club | Season | Division | Apps | Goals | Apps | Goals | Apps | Goals |
|---|---|---|---|---|---|---|---|---|
AEL Limassol
| AEL Limassol | 2009–10 | Cypriot First Division | 3 | 0 | 0 | 0 | 3 | 0 |
| AEL Limassol | 2010–11 | Cypriot First Division | 1 | 0 | 0 | 0 | 1 | 0 |
| AEL Limassol | 2011–12 | Cypriot First Division | 0 | 0 | 0 | 0 | 0 | 0 |
| AEL Limassol | 2012–13 | Cypriot First Division | 0 | 0 | 0 | 0 | 0 | 0 |
| AEL Limassol | Total | | 4 | 0 | 0 | 0 | 4 | 0 |
Alki
| Alki | 2013–14 | Cypriot First Division | 23 | 0 | 1 | 0 | 24 | 0 |
Ermis
| Ermis | 2014–15 | Cypriot First Division | 13 | 0 | 2 | 0 | 15 | 0 |
| Ermis | 2015–16 | Cypriot First Division | 28 | 0 | 2 | 0 | 30 | 0 |
| Ermis | 2016–17 | Cypriot First Division | 27 | 0 | 1 | 0 | 28 | 0 |
| Ermis | 2017–18 | Cypriot First Division | 12 | 0 | 0 | 0 | 12 | 0 |
| Ermis | Total | | 80 | 0 | 5 | 0 | 85 | 0 |
Karmiotissa
| Karmiotissa | 2017–18 | Cypriot Second Division | 5 | 0 | 1 | 0 | 6 | 0 |
| Alki Oroklini | 2018–19 | Cypriot First Division | 20 | 0 | 0 | 0 | 20 | 0 |
| Doxa Katokopias | 2019–20 | Cypriot First Division | 13 | 0 | 3 | 0 | 16 | 0 |
| Doxa Katokopias | 2020–21 | Cypriot First Division | 28 | 1 | 1 | 0 | 29 | 1 |
| Doxa Katokopias | 2021–22 | Cypriot First Division | 7 | 0 | 1 | 0 | 8 | 0 |
| Doxa Katokopias | Total | | 48 | 1 | 5 | 0 | 53 | 1 |
| Lahti | 2022 | Veikkausliiga | 16 | 0 | 4 | 0 | 20 | 0 |
| Llapi | 2022–23 | Kosovo Superleague | 4 | 0 | 1 | 0 | 5 | 0 |
| Olympiakos Nicosia | 2023–24 | Cypriot Second Division | 17 | 0 | 2 | 0 | 19 | 0 |
| Ypsonas | 2024–25 | Cypriot Second Division | 13 | 0 | 1 | 0 | 14 | 0 |
| Career total | | | 230 | 1 | 20 | 0 | 250 | 1 |

== Honours ==
Ermis Aradippou

- Cypriot Super Cup: 2014
