= Marcos Michael =

Cypriot footballer (born 1991)

Personal information
- Date of birth: 13 June 1991 (age 35)
- Place of birth: Limassol, Cyprus
- Height: 1.88 m (6 ft 2 in)
- Position: Striker

Team information
- Current team: FC Livadia

Youth career
- –2010: Bolton Wanderers

Senior career*
| Years | Team | Apps | (Gls) |
| 2010–2014 | Anorthosis | 12 | (2) |
| 2012 | → EN Parekklisias (loan) | 8 | (5) |
| 2012–2013 | → Olympiakos Nicosia (loan) | 16 | (4) |
| 2013–2014 | → Nikos & Sokratis Erimis (loan) | 14 | (1) |
| 2014–2015 | Aris Limassol | 16 | (2) |
| 2015–2016 | Nea Salamina | 4 | (0) |
| 2016 | Petrolul Ploiești | 11 | (0) |
| 2016–2020 | ASIL Lysi | 78 | (30) |
| 2020–2021 | Othellos Athienou | 30 | (25) |
| 2021–2022 | Alki Oroklini | 22 | (8) |
| 2022–2023 | Omonia Aradippou | 24 | (1) |
| 2023–2024 | Anagennisi Deryneia | 27 | (14) |
| 2024– | FC Livadia | | |

International career
| 2009–2011 | Cyprus U19 | 3 | (2) |
| 2011 | Cyprus U21 | 1 | (3) |
- * Club domestic league appearances and goals as of 13:52, 23 June 2024 (UTC)

Marcos Michael (Greek: Μάρκος Μιχαήλ; born 13 June 1991) is a Cypriot footballer who plays for Cypriot Third Division club FC Livadia.

Marcos Michael is a product of Bolton Wanderers F.C. youth system and he started his professional career from Anorthosis FC, after the call-up from Anorthosis 2nd teams squad from coach Boban Krčmarević due to the lack of available players to the position of striker.
