= Angelos Pournos =

Greek footballer

Personal information
- Date of birth: 21 June 1992 (age 34)
- Place of birth: Athens, Greece
- Height: 1.74 m (5 ft 9 in)
- Position: Defensive midfielder

Team information
- Current team: Panelefsiniakos
- Number: 14

Youth career
- 2007–2010: AEK Athens U20

Senior career*
Years	Team	Apps	(Gls)
2010	Enosis Aspropyrgos	2	(0)
2011	VV De Meern	18	(6)
2011	Iraklis Psachna	5	(0)
2012	Vyzas	7	(0)
2012	Panionios	0	(0)
2013	Vyzas	17	(1)
2013–2014	Nea Salamis	0	(0)
2013–2014	→ Karmiotissa (loan)	18	(3)
2014–2015	Paniliakos	6	(0)
2015	Zakynthos	3	(0)
2015–	Panelefsiniakos	13	(0)
- * Club domestic league appearances and goals as of 24 March 2017

Angelos Pournos (Greek: Άγγελος Πούρνος; born 21 June 1992) is a Greek footballer who plays for Panelefsiniakos as a defensive midfielder.

== Career ==
Pournos began playing football with AEK Athens U20. He also played for Enosis Aspropyrgos, VV De Meern, Iraklis Psachna, Vyzas, Panionios G.S.S., Nea Salamina and Karmiotissa. In July 2014 Pournos signed for Paniliakos.
