= Theodosis Kyprou =

Cypriot footballer (born 1992)

Personal information
- Full name: Theodosis Kyprou
- Date of birth: 24 February 1992 (age 34)
- Place of birth: Nicosia, Cyprus
- Height: 1.76 m (5 ft 9 1/2 in)
- Positions: Winger; forward

Team information
- Current team: Karmiotissa
- Number: 77

Youth career
- Omonia

Senior career*
Years	Team	Apps	(Gls)
2009–2012	Omonia	4	(0)
2011–2012	→ Chalkanoras Idaliou (loan)	11	(5)
2012–2013	Chalkanoras Idaliou	26	(12)
2014	AEL Kalloni	8	(0)
2015–2016	Aris Limassol	30	(3)
2016–2018	Omonia	16	(0)
2017–2018	→ Aris Limassol (loan)	1	(0)
2018–2019	Aris Limassol	26	(9)
2019–2021	Ermis Aradippou	42	(8)
2021–2023	Omonia 29M	37	(13)
2023–2024	Omonia Aradippou	26	(5)
2024–2025	Krasava Ypsonas	30	(8)
2025–	Karmiotissa	22	(13)

International career^{‡}
2013	Cyprus U21	1	(0)
- * Club domestic league appearances and goals as of 3 May 2026 ‡ National team caps and goals as of 31 December 2014

Theodosis Kyprou (Greek: Θεοδόσης Κύπρου; born 24 February 1992) is a footballer who plays as a forward for Karmiotissa.

== Career ==
An Omonia youth product, Kyprou led the Athletic High School of Nicosia to the ISSF World championship glory in 2009 in Turkey, being the tournament's topscorer.

He made his first appearance for Omonia against Paphos and he was in the starting line-up against Apollon Limassol for first time. After leaving Omonia he became a journeyman playing for various clubs in Cyprus.

== Honours ==
Omonia

- Cypriot Championship: 2010
- Cypriot Cup: 2011
- Cyprus FA Shield: 2010

== See also ==
- International School Sport Federation
