= Pedrito (footballer, born 1989) =

Spanish footballer

Personal information
- Full name: Pedro Pareja Duque
- Date of birth: 28 April 1989 (age 37)
- Place of birth: Canet de Mar, Spain
- Height: 1.72 m (5 ft 7 1/2 in)
- Position: Forward

Team information
- Current team: Mataró

Youth career
- 2006–2007: Vilassar Mar

Senior career*
Years	Team	Apps	(Gls)
2007–2010	Málaga B	75	(25)
2009–2010	Málaga	3	(0)
2010–2012	Llagostera	65	(13)
2012–2013	Reus	37	(2)
2013–2014	Doxa	33	(4)
2014–2017	Nea Salamina	70	(7)
2018–	Mataró	8	(5)
- * Club domestic league appearances and goals as of 26 August 2018

Pedro Pareja Duque (born 28 April 1989), commonly known as Pedrito, is a Spanish footballer who plays for CE Mataró as a forward.

== Football career ==
Born in Canet de Mar, Barcelona, Catalonia, Pedrito joined Málaga CF in the summer of 2007 from amateurs UE Vilassar de Mar. He spent the vast majority of his spell with the Andalusians with the reserves in Tercera División, scoring 14 goals in his second year as the team eventually failed to promote in the playoffs.

Pedrito made his first-team debut on 13 December 2009, coming on as a substitute for Fernando in the last minutes of a 1–1 away draw against Real Valladolid. He made a further two La Liga appearances during that season, totalling 61 minutes.

In June 2010, Pedrito's contract expired and was not renewed by Málaga. Subsequently, he returned to his native region and joined fourth level club UE Llagostera.

From 2013 to 2017, Pedrito competed in the Cypriot First Division.

== Club statistics ==
As of 5 April 2015

Club	Season	League			Cup		Other		Total	
Club	Season	Division	Apps	Goals	Apps	Goals	Apps	Goals	Apps	Goals
Málaga	2009–10	La Liga	3	0	0	0	—		3	0
Málaga	2010–11	La Liga	0	0	0	0	—		0	0
Málaga	Total		3	0	0	0	—		3	0
Llagostera	2011–12	Segunda División B	29	1	3	0	—		32	1
Reus	2012–13	Segunda División B	37	2	0	0	—		37	2
Doxa	2013–14	Cypriot First Division	33	4	5	1	—		38	5
Nea Salamis	2014–15	Cypriot First Division	25	1	2	0	—		27	1
Career total			127	8	10	1	0	0	137	9
