= Leandro Souza (footballer, born 1987) =

Brazilian footballer

Leandro
Personal information
- Full name: Leandro Paulo Roberto Souza
- Date of birth: 23 February 1987 (age 39)
- Place of birth: Pernambuco, Brazil
- Height: 1.89 m (6 ft 2 in)
- Position: Forward

Team information
- Current team: Torreense
- Number: 9

Senior career*
Years	Team	Apps	(Gls)
2006–2007	Lagartense		
2007–2008	Ribeirão	9	(2)
2008–2009	Alpendorada	4	(0)
2009–2010	Mêda	29	(6)
2010–2011	Benfica Castelo Branco	22	(4)
2011–2012	Boavista	23	(2)
2012–2013	Mirandela	26	(15)
2013–2014	Doxa	29	(10)
2014–2015	Moreirense	15	(1)
2015–2016	Famalicão	36	(14)
2016–2017	Desportivo das Aves	8	(1)
2017–2018	União de Leiria	29	(16)
2018–2019	Vizela	33	(12)
2019	Vilafranquense	5	(0)
2020–	Torreense	7	(1)
- * Club domestic league appearances and goals as of 17:29, 31 May 2020 (UTC)

Leandro Paulo Roberto Souza (born 23 February 1987) is a Brazilian footballer who plays for S.C.U. Torreense.

== Club career ==
After playing for local club Lagartense, Leandro started his Portuguese journey playing for Ribeirão, Alpendorada, Mêda, Benfica Castelo Branco, Boavista, Mirandela in the third division. While playing for Mirandela, Leandro scored 15 goals and he became the third highest scorer in Portuguese Second Division.

In the summer of 2013, Leandro joined Doxa Katokopias of Cypriot First Division.

On the last day of the summer transfer window, 31 August 2014, Leandro signed a one-year deal with newly promoted Portuguese side Moreirense.
