= Elias Elia (footballer) =

Cypriot footballer (born 1985)

Elias Christodoulou
Personal information
- Full name: Elias Elia Christodoulou
- Date of birth: 6 November 1985 (age 41)
- Place of birth: Limassol, Cyprus
- Height: 1.76 m (5 ft 9 1/2 in)
- Positions: Defensive midfielder; right back

Team information
- Current team: AEZ Zakakiou
- Number: 18

Senior career*
| Years | Team | Apps | (Gls) |
| 2002–2012 | Aris Limassol | 95 | (8) |
| 2012–2013 | APEP | 13 | (0) |
| 2013–2015 | Nikos & Sokratis Erimis | 37 | (1) |
| 2015– | AEZ Zakakiou | 1 | (0) |
- * Club domestic league appearances and goals as of September 26, 2015

Elias Elia Christodoulou (Greek: Ηλίας Ηλία Χριστοδούλου; born 6 November 1985) is a Cypriot footballer who for AEZ Zakakiou as a defensive midfielder.

== Career ==
Elia comes from Aris Limassol academies until 2002 when he was promoted to the men's team of the club. During his ten-year presence in Aris, Elia had 95 league match appearances and scored 8 goals both in first and second division. Next years Elia was wondered in some clubs of the second division. In 2012, he moved to APEP for only one season and played in thirteen matches. His next club was Nikos & Sokratis Erimis with which he had 37 appearances and scored 1 goal in two seasons. In May 2015, Elia signed for AEZ Zakakiou.

== Personal life ==
Before 2014 was named as Elias Elia but since then he decided to change his surname to Christodoulou.
