= Maksym Ilchysh =

Ukrainian footballer (born 1992)

Personal information
- Full name: Maksym Oleksandrovych Ilchysh
- Date of birth: 5 November 1992 (age 34)
- Place of birth: Poltava, Ukraine
- Height: 1.87 m (6 ft 1 1/2 in)
- Position: Defender

Team information
- Current team: FC Karlivka

Youth career
- 2000–2009: Molod Poltava

Senior career*
Years	Team	Apps	(Gls)
2009–2013	Vorskla Poltava	0	(0)
2013	AEL Limassol	2	(0)
2013–2014	Kremin Kremenchuk	7	(1)
2014–	Karlivka	8	(0)

International career^{‡}
2009–2010	Ukraine U18	9	(0)
- * Club domestic league appearances and goals as of 10 April 2014 ‡ National team caps and goals as of 10 April 2014

Maksym Oleksandrovych Ilchysh (Ukrainian: Максим Олександрович Ільчиш; born 5 November 1992) is a Ukrainian professional football defender who previously played for FC Karlivka in the Ukrainian Second League

== Career ==
Ilchysh is a product of the Molod Poltava academy. His first coaches were Oleksandr Yezhakov and Serhiy Khodoryev.

He signed a three-year deal with the Cypriot football club AEL Limassol in February 2013, and in October of the same year, he returned to Ukraine.
