= Dimitrios Raptakis =

Greek footballer

Personal information
- Full name: Dimitrios Raptakis
- Date of birth: January 20, 1988 (age 38)
- Place of birth: Heraklion, Crete, Greece
- Height: 1.86 m (6 ft 1 in)
- Position: Centre back

Youth career
- Olympiakos Chersonissos

Senior career*
Years	Team	Apps	(Gls)
2006–2007	Olympiakos Chersonissos	0	(0)
2007–2008	Platanias	0	(0)
2008–2009	Giouchtas Archanon	0	(0)
2009–2011	Olympiakos Chersonissos	36	(3)
2011	Chania	11	(0)
2011–2012	Platanias	26	(0)
2012–2013	AEL	14	(0)
2013	Nea Salamina	4	(0)
2013–2014	PAE Kerkyra	15	(1)
2015–	OFI	0	(0)
- * Club domestic league appearances and goals as of 14 June 2013

Dimitrios Raptakis (Greek: Δημήτριος Ραπτάκης; born 20 January 1988) is a Greek professional football player who playing for OFI.
