= Mattia Cinquini =

Italian professional footballer

Personal information
- Date of birth: 11 May 1990 (age 36)
- Place of birth: Cuneo, Italy
- Height: 1.85 m (6 ft 1 in)
- Position: Centre back

Team information
- Current team: Paradiso
- Number: 12

Youth career
- 2007–2009: AS Roma

Senior career*
Years	Team	Apps	(Gls)
2009–2010	Biaschesi	21	(1)
2010–2011	Team Ticino U21	30	(2)
2011–2012	Biaschesi	25	(1)
2014	Enosis Neon Paralimni	11	(1)
2014–2017	Nea Salamina	56	(1)
2017	Chiasso	14	(0)
2017–2019	Köniz	47	(4)
2019–2020	Ħamrun Spartans	19	(0)
2020–2021	Ayia Napa	25	(3)
2021–2022	Chiasso	10	(0)
2022	Lugano	1	(0)
2022	Lugano II	11	(0)
2022–2023	Rapperswil-Jona	32	(0)
2023–2024	Ayia Napa	24	(0)
2024–	Paradiso	20	(0)
- * Club domestic league appearances and goals as of 22 June 2025

Mattia Cinquini (born 11 May 1990) is an Italian professional footballer who plays for Swiss club Paradiso.

== Club career ==
On 30 July 2022, Cinquini signed a one-year contract with Rapperswil-Jona in Swiss Promotion League.
