= Vasilis Papageorgiou =

Greek-Swedish writer and translator

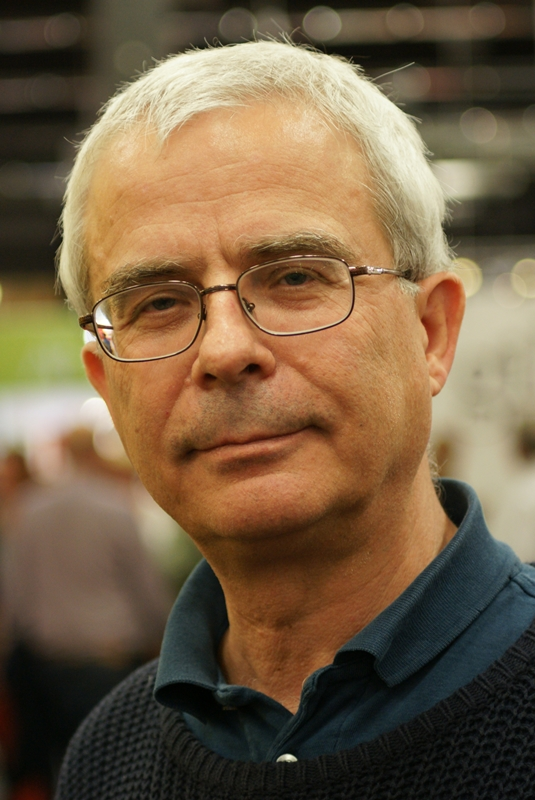
- Vasilis Papageorgiou at the Book Fair in Göteborg, 2014.
- Born: 1955; Thessaloniki, Greece
- Occupations: writer, translator, professor

Vasilis Papageorgiou (Greek: Βασίλης Παπαγεωργίου, Thessaloniki, 1955) is a Greek-Swedish writer and translator. From 1975 to 2023 he lived in Sweden. He has published many literary works in different genres in Greece and Sweden. He has translated books of numerous writers into Greek, such as W. G. Sebald, Willy Kyrklund, Eva Runefelt, Magnus William-Olsson, Tomas Tranströmer (Collected poems, shortlisted for the Greek National translation prize 2005) and John Ashbery. He has translated into Swedish (with different colleagues) books of Odysseas Elytis, Thanasis Valtinos, Kenneth Koch, W. G. Sebald, John Ashbery, all the poems and fragments of Sappho (annotated edition) and an annotated collection with posthumous poems and prose of Konstantinos Kavafis. He has published essays, book reviews and literary texts in Greek, Swedish and British journals. He is a docent of comparative literature and professor emeritus of creative writing at Linnaeus University in Sweden. In 2015, he received the award "Swedish-Greek of the Year" by the Board for Cultural Exchange between Sweden and Greece.

His thesis Euripides’ Medea and Cosmetics is a post-structuralist analysis of the tragedy, in which Euripides, with the help of the radical otherness of Medea, criticises the Greek logos. His monograph on the poetry collection Mjuka mörkret by Eva Runefelt, Panta rei i Mjuka mörkret, and his essay collection Here, and Here: Essays on Affirmation and Tragic Awareness, are a series of critical analyses, which try to follow the use of logos as it exceeds the arbitrariness of logos within an affirmative and tragically aware openness. In his most recent theoretical and literary publications Papageorgiou studies how certain texts turn melancholia (which is generated by the paralysis of logos) into euphoria (which is created by a logos free from the arbitrariness of logos), and vice versa.

== Publications ==
=== In Greece ===
- Κρυπταισθησίες, 1979
- Σύγχρονοι Σουηδοί Ποιητές, 1988
- Παίξ’ το πάλι Χαμ, 1997
- Νυμφαίος θάνατος, 1998
- Tomas Tranströmer, Τα ποιήματα, 2004
- Ιππόλυτος Καλυπτόμενος, 2005
- Ευφορία, 2014
- Στιγμές θέρους, 2016
- Αϋπνία (Aypnia), 2017
- Κλαίρη Μιτσοτάκη: Μας παίρνει ο αέρας, 2017
- Θανάσης Βαλτινός: Ήλοι, ελιές, λέξεις, ήλιος, 2017
- Ωραίες ψυχές, 2019
- Μοναχική ανθοφορία: Μέρες χωρίς κορώνες, 2020
- Δημήτρης Δημητριάδης: Χώρα, σώματα, λέξεις, 2020
- Στιγμώνες, Προαισθήματα και αισθήματα κοσμογονίας, 2023
- Φόνοι στη Θεσσαλονίκη, 2025

=== In Sweden ===
- Euripides’ Medea and Cosmetics, 1986
- Konstantinos Kavafis, Den osannolika gryningen (with Lo Snöfall), 1993
- Boken om Malmö, 1994 (curator)
- Skeptikerns dilemma: Texter om Willy Kyrklunds författarskap, 1997 (editor)
- Handens blick (with Lo Snöfall), 1998
- Sapfo, Dikter och fragment (with Magnus William-Olsson), 1999 (enlarged pocket version 2006)
- Malmö City International, 2000
- En hand klär sakta (with Lo Snöfall), 2002
- Panta rei i Mjuka mörkret, 2003
- Hippolytos Beslöjad, 2006
- Ingen hand orörd (with Lo Snöfall), 2007

=== In the United Kingdom ===
- Here, and Here: Essays on Affirmation and Tragic Awareness, 2010
