= Kostandin Ndoni =

Albanian footballer

Personal information
- Full name: Kostandin Ndoni
- Date of birth: 31 March 1989 (age 37)
- Place of birth: Lushnja, Albania
- Position: Centre back

Team information
- Current team: Kukësi
- Number: 21

Senior career*
Years	Team	Apps	(Gls)
2010–2013	Apolonia	39	(5)
2013–2014	Nea Salamina	0	(0)
2013–2014	→ Othellos Athienou (loan)	24	(1)
2014–2015	Kastrioti	6	(0)
2015–2016	Kukësi	4	(0)
2016–2017	Kyanous Asteras Vari		
- * Club domestic league appearances and goals as of 6 October 2015

Kostandin Ndoni (born 31 March 1989 in Lushnja) is an Albanian footballer who plays as a centre back for Kukësi in the Albanian Superliga.
