= Bruno Agnello =

Brazilian footballer (born 1985)

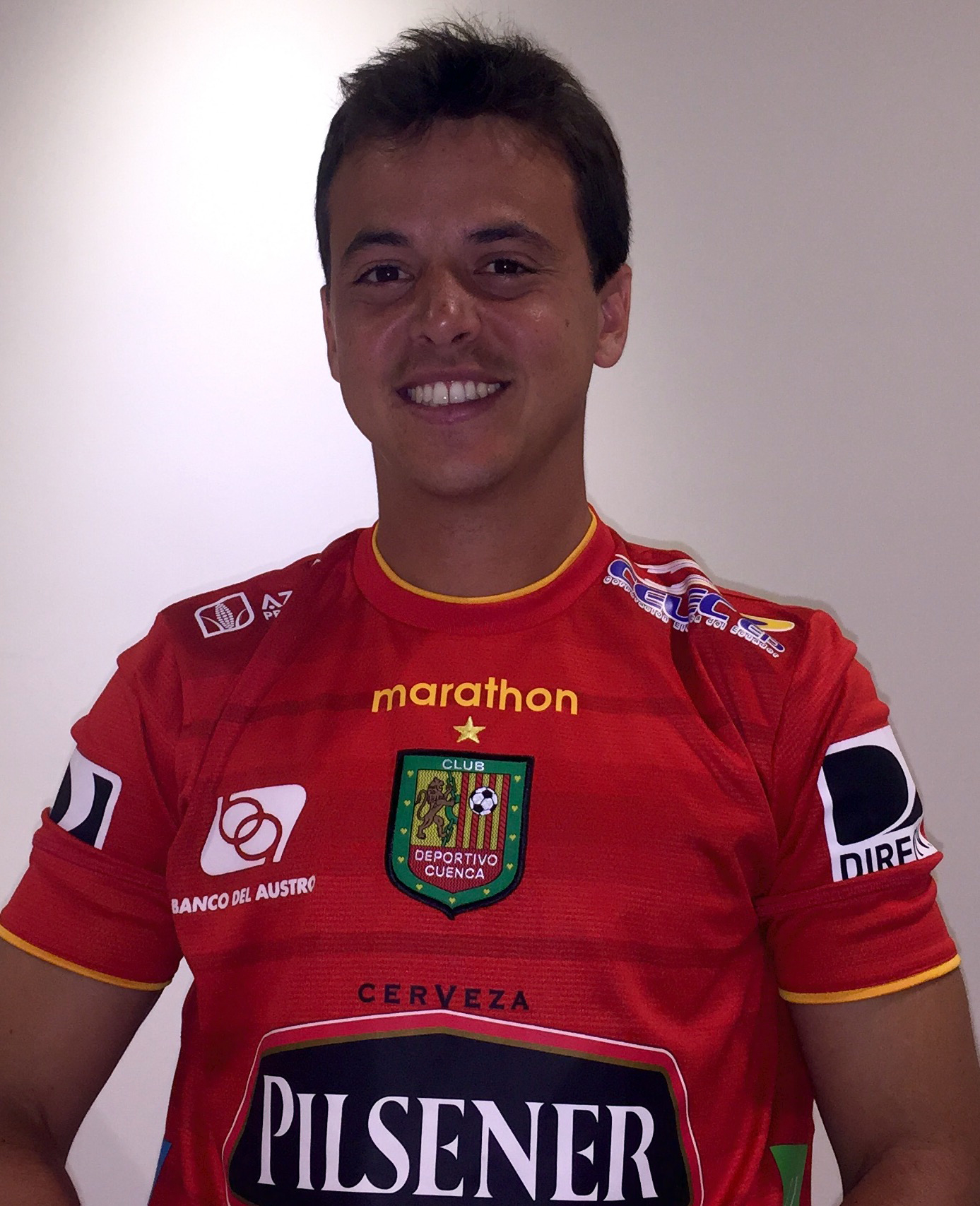
- Agnello in 2015 at Bucheon FC 1995

Personal information
- Full name: Bruno de Camargo Agnello
- Date of birth: 7 December 1985 (age 40)
- Place of birth: Santos, São Paulo, Brazil
- Height: 1.76 m (5 ft 9 in)
- Position: Midfielder

Team information
- Current team: G3nerationX FC - G3X FC
- Number: 10

Youth career
- 1994–2001: Santos FC

Senior career*
Years	Team	Apps	(Gls)
2001–2004	Portuguesa Santista	10	(1)
2005–2007	Jabaquara	15	(6)
2007–2008	Al-Hilal	2	(0)
2008	Boavista-RJ	0	(0)
2009	Ituano FC	10	(2)
2010	Inter-SM	2	(1)
2011	Volta Redonda-RJ	3	(0)
2012–2013	Oliveirense	2	(0)
2013	AEK Kouklia	0	(0)
2013–2014	Moura	7	(0)
2014	Bucheon FC 1995	0	(0)
2015	CA Juventus	3	(0)
2015	Deportivo Cuenca	9	(0)
2016	UTC Cajamarca	15	(1)
2016	KF Laçi	6	(0)
2017	Cúcuta Deportivo	10	(0)
2018–2019	Alianza Atlético	10	(0)
2024–current	G3nerationX FC - G3X FC	3	(1)
Medal record
Fut7
Supercopa Desimpedidos
Winner	2024 Brazil
- * Club domestic league appearances and goals

Bruno de Camargo Agnello, better known as Bruno Agnello (born 7 December 1985), is a Brazilian former professional footballer who has played as a midfielder.

== Career ==
=== Youth teams ===
Agnello started playing football at 8 years old with Santos FC youth teams, playing indoor soccer for Santos as well. He played there until 2001 in the U-19 squad, playing together with well-known players like Robinho and Diego.

=== Portuguesa Santista ===
After, he signed his first professional contract with Portuguesa Santista (the second team in the city of Santos-SP) in 2002, staying in third place in the Paulista Championship 1st division, losing the semi-final against São Paulo FC.

=== Al Hilal (Saudi Arabia) ===
In 2007, he signed for Al-Hilal from Saudi Premier League for one season.

=== Portugal ===
The last 2012–2013 mid-season, he joined U.D. Oliveirense from Quarta Liga.

=== Ecuador ===
In July 2015, he went to Deportivo Cuenca.

=== South Korea ===
In 2014, Agnello was hired by the then coach of the Bucheon FC 1995 team, for which he did not play any matches for the team, since the coach who chose him was fired shortly afterwards. The subsequent coach did not select him for the matches, and Bruno then had to request his release from the South Korean team.

=== Legend ===
In 2025 he played for G3nerationX FC (G3X FC), a Brazilian seven-a-side team, now co-chaired by Gaules and Kelvin Oliveira, which competes in Kings League championships around the world.
