= Corrin Brooks-Meade =

English-born footballer (1988–2025)

Personal information
- Date of birth: 19 March 1988
- Place of birth: Enfield, London, England
- Date of death: 5 April 2025 (aged 37)
- Height: 1.90 m (6 ft 3 in)
- Position: Goalkeeper

Senior career*
Years	Team	Apps	(Gls)
2006–2008	Fulham	0	(0)
2007	→ Lewes (loan)	2	(0)
2007	→ Darlington (loan)	0	(0)
2007	→ AFC Wimbledon (loan)	1	(0)
2008–2009	Ermis Aradippou	9	(0)
2009–2013	Alki Larnaca	12	(0)
2011–2012	→ Ermis Aradippou (loan)	17	(0)
2013–2014	Omonia	3	(0)
2014–2015	Nea Salamis	16	(0)
2015–2016	Ethnikos Achna	3	(0)
2016	Akritas Chlorakas	12	(0)
2017	Montana	8	(0)
2020–2021	Oroklini-Troulloi	5	(0)

International career
2015–2024	Montserrat	23	(0)
- * Club domestic league appearances and goals

Corrin Alex Brooks-Meade (19 March 1988 – 5 April 2025) was a footballer who played as a goalkeeper. He played in his native England for Fulham, where he began his career, as well as having loan spells at Lewes, Darlington and AFC Wimbledon. Born in England, he made 23 appearances for the Montserrat national team.

== Club career ==
=== Fulham ===
Born in the Borough of Enfield, London, Brooks-Meade began his career with local club Fulham in 2006. He became a regular member of the club's reserve side, playing for the second string as early as August 2006. Brooks-Meade stayed at Fulham until 2008, but failed to make a first-team appearance. After numerous loan spells at lower-league clubs, the goalkeeper was released on 28 May 2008, along with nine other players including Carlos Bocanegra, Jari Litmanen and Tony Warner. After his release, Brooks-Meade spent a month with League One club Bournemouth, but fellow League One club Yeovil Town also made an offer promising the role of back-up goalkeeper after an initial one-week trial. However, the deal eventually collapsed and Brooks-Meade was left still without a club. He later expressed regret at not signing for Bournemouth, saying "I was a bit disappointed that I didn't stay at Bournemouth because it was likely that I would have signed a contract with them." Brooks-Meade later received an offer from Cypriot club Alki Larnaca, which he accepted.

=== Loan spells ===
Brooks-Meade was first sent out on loan when he joined Lewes on 12 January 2007. He made his debut the following day in a 3–1 win over Sutton United, and also played in a 1–1 draw with Newport County on 27 January. Brooks-Meade was recalled by Fulham on 29 January 2007.

Darlington signed Brooks-Meade on loan on 1 August 2007, with manager Dave Penney signing him on an emergency loan after an injury to the club's regular goalkeeper David Stockdale. Brooks-Meade left Darlington on 29 October without having made a first-team appearance.

In November 2007, Brooks-Meade joined AFC Wimbledon on loan, as cover for the injured Andy Little. However, he suffered a medial ligament injury to his knee on his debut against Tonbridge Angels and was soon sent back to Fulham for treatment. Brooks-Meade left Wimbledon on 14 November.

=== Ermis Aradippou ===
Brooks-Meade joined Ermis Aradippou in 2008. He later stated that he had joined the club because "I thought to myself that there are many countries where I can progress and gain experience as a professional footballer and also fancied a change, so decided to take the offer."

The goalkeeper saved a penalty to help Ermis to an extra–time Cypriot Cup victory over Apollon Limassol in February 2012.

=== AC Omonoia ===
In June 2013 Brooks-Meade signed for AC Omonoia.

=== Montana ===
On 4 January 2017, Brooks-Meade signed a one-and-a-half-year contract with Montana. After several games on the bench, he made his debut in a 1–0 win at FC Lokomotiv Gorna Oryahovitsa on 1 March. He left the club in June 2017 due to a relegation clause in his contract.

=== Oroklini-Troulloi ===
In September 2020, after three years away from club football, Brooks-Meade joined Cypriot Third Division club Oroklini-Troulloi.

== International career ==
In March 2015, Brooks-Meade was called up to play for the Montserrat national team to play in their qualification ties for the 2018 FIFA World Cup. He made his debut as the starting keeper in a 2–1 loss away to Curaçao later that month. He earned his second cap on 1 April 2015 in a 2–2 draw against the same opposition.

== Death ==
Brooks-Meade died on 5 April 2025, at the age of 37.
