= Konstantinos Kastanas =

Cypriot footballer (born 1993)

Personal information
- Date of birth: 6 April 1993 (age 33)
- Place of birth: Larnaca, Cyprus
- Height: 1.86 m (6 ft 1 in)
- Position: Defender

Team information
- Current team: Nea Salamina Famagusta FC
- Number: 15

Youth career
- AEK Larnaca

Senior career*
Years	Team	Apps	(Gls)
2011–2016	AEK Larnaca	4	(0)
2013–2014	→ Alki Larnaca (loan)	19	(0)
2016	Othellos Athienou	8	(0)
2017–2020	ASIL Lysi	55	(0)
2020–2021	Othellos Athienou		
2021–2022	Alki Oroklini	10	(0)
2022–2024	Othellos Athienou	45	(3)
2024–25	Krasava ENY Ypsonas FC	26	(0)
2025-	Nea Salamina Famagusta FC	22	(2)
- * Club domestic league appearances and goals as of 3 May 2026

Konstantinos Kastanas (Greek: Κωνσταντίνος Καστάνας; born 6 April 1993) is a Cypriot footballer who plays for Nea Salamina Famagusta FC as a defender.
