= Loizos Kakoyiannis =

Cypriot footballer (born 1981)

Personal information
- Full name: Loizos Kakoyiannis
- Date of birth: May 2, 1981 (age 45)
- Place of birth: Omodos, Limassol, Cyprus
- Height: 1.86 m (6 ft 1 in)
- Position: Defender

Team information
- Current team: Enosis Neon Parekklisia
- Number: 81

Senior career*
Years	Team	Apps	(Gls)
1998–2003	Apollon Limassol	41	(2)
2003–2005	Ethnikos Achnas	47	(2)
2005–2008	AC Omonia	52	(3)
2008–2011	AEL Limassol	44	(2)
2011–2012	AEP Paphos	28	(2)
2013	Aris Limassol	12	(0)
2013	P.A.O. Krousona		
2014–2015	Karmiotissa Polemidion	16	(1)
2015–2016	Enosis Neon Parekklisia	21	(2)
2016–2017	Akritas Chlorakas	14	(1)
2017–	Enosis Neon Parekklisia	3	(0)

International career^{‡}
2004–2005	Cyprus	6	(0)
- * Club domestic league appearances and goals as of 28 January 2017 ‡ National team caps and goals as of 10 October 2014

Loizos Kakoyiannis (born May 2, 1981, in Cyprus) is a Cypriot football defender, who currently plays for Enosis Neon Parekklisia. He started his professional career from Apollon Limassol and then he played also for Ethnikos Achnas, Omonia Nicosia, AEL Limassol, AEP Paphos, Aris Limassol, P.A.O. Krousona, Karmiotissa and Akritas Chlorakas.

== Career ==
After impressing at Ethnikos Achnas he moved to AC Omonia, AEL Limassol tried several times to buy this player when he was at Ethnikos Achnas but finally managed to apply him to the roster at the season 2008/2009. He played well in his first season at the club, but in the 2009/2010 season he struggled to start in the starting eleven. But when he was given the opportunity he impressed his coach, and even scored the winning goal at the 85' minute.
