= Alexandre Negri =

Brazilian footballer (born 1981)

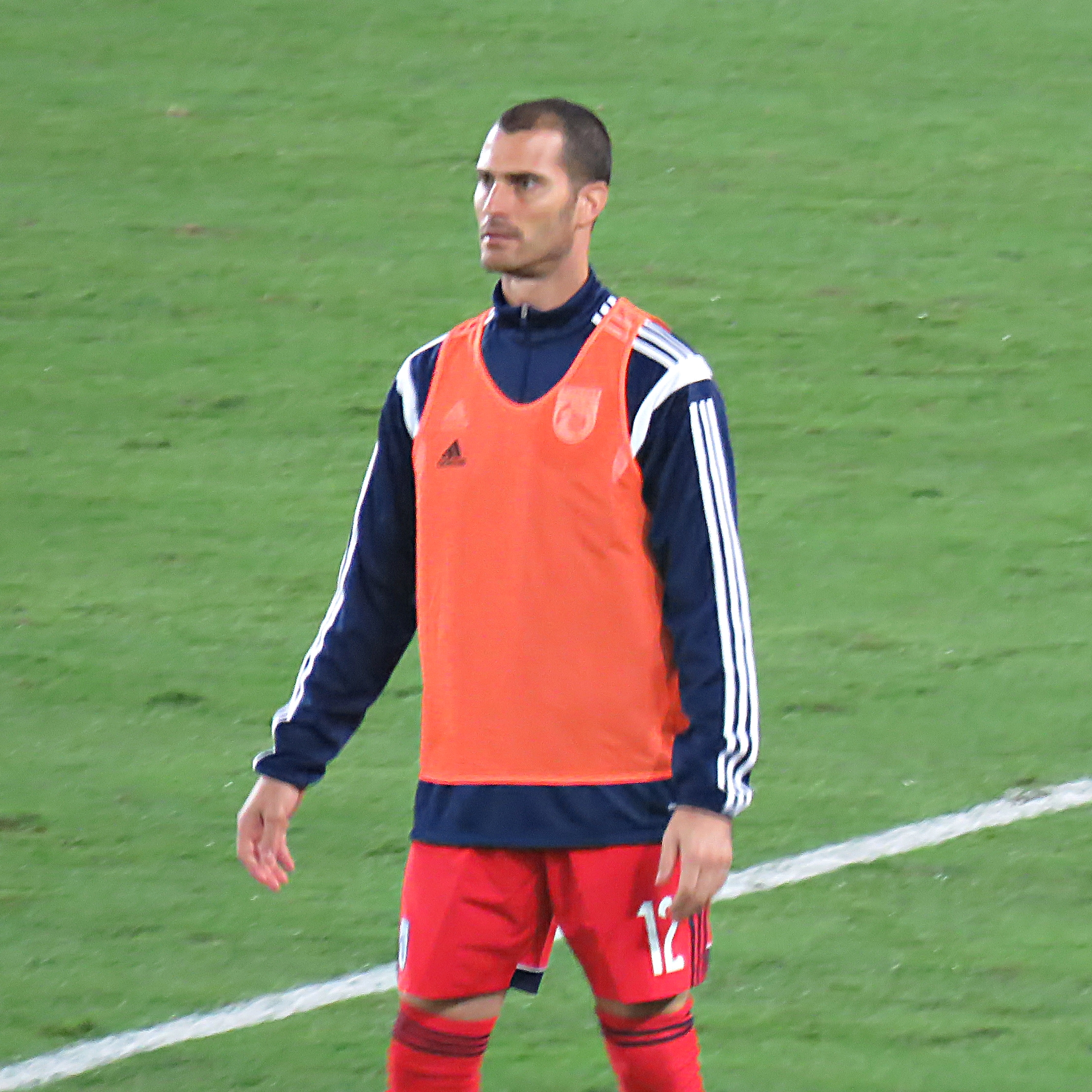
- Negri in 2015

Personal information
- Date of birth: 27 March 1981 (age 45)
- Place of birth: Vinhedo, Brazil
- Height: 1.82 m (6 ft 0 in)
- Position: Goalkeeper

Senior career*
| Years | Team | Apps | (Gls) |
| 2000–2004 | Ponte Preta | 42 | (0) |
| 2004 | negri shibani fakani negri maika vi deeba tupa | 0 | (0) |
| 2004–2005 | Universitatea Craiova | 10 | (0) |
| 2005–2006 | Fortaleza | 35 | (0) |
| 2006–2007 | Aris Thessaloniki | 1 | (0) |
| 2007–2009 | APOP Kinyras | 29 | (0) |
| 2009–2015 | AEK Larnaca | 110 | (0) |
| 2012–2013 | → Doxa Katokopias (loan) | 28 | (0) |
| 2015–2017 | Doxa Katokopias | 50 | (0) |
| 2017–2018 | THOI Lakatamia | 19 | (0) |
| Total | | 324 | (0) |

Managerial career
- 2018–: ASIL Lysi
- * Club domestic league appearances and goals

Alexandre Negri (born 27 March 1981) is a Brazilian former professional footballer who played as a goalkeeper and who works for Cypriot First Division club Doxa Katokopias as goalkeeping coach. He signed in 2007 from Aris Thessaloniki. Born in Brazil, he was naturalized as a Cypriot citizen.

Negri previously played for Ponte Preta in the Campeonato Brasileiro.

== International career ==
Negri was called up to the senior Cyprus squad for a UEFA Euro 2016 qualifier against Bosnia and Herzegovina in October 2015.
