= Emilios Panayiotou =

Cypriot footballer

Personal information
- Full name: Emilios Panayiotou
- Date of birth: 22 September 1992 (age 34)
- Place of birth: Limassol, Cyprus
- Height: 1.75 m (5 ft 9 in)
- Position: Midfielder

Team information
- Current team: AEZ Zakakiou

Youth career
- 2007–2009: Sochaux
- 2009–2012: APOEL

Senior career*
Years	Team	Apps	(Gls)
2009–2014	APOEL	0	(0)
2012–2013	→ Olympiakos Nicosia (loan)	15	(1)
2013–2014	→ Alki Larnaca (loan)	17	(0)
2014–2015	Aris Limassol	11	(0)
2017–	AEZ Zakakiou	1	(0)

International career^{‡}
2010–	Cyprus U21	15	(0)
- * Club domestic league appearances and goals as of 4 April 2015 ‡ National team caps and goals as of 5 September 2014

Emilios Panayiotou (Greek: Αιμίλιος Παναγιώτου; born 22 September 1992 in Limassol, Cyprus) is a Cypriot footballer who plays as a midfielder for AEZ Zakakiou in the Cypriot Second Division.

== Career ==
He made his first football steps at the age of six at Polemidia and a year later he joined AEL Limassol academies. After a test in PSV Eindhoven, Emilios joined the Academies of Nikodimos Papavasiliou. In 2007, after having passed through tests in Manchester City, Southampton and AJ Auxerre, he joined the academies of Sochaux. Two years later, he returned to Cyprus and signed a contract with APOEL. On 10 February 2010, he made his debut with APOEL in a Cypriot Cup match against Ermis Aradippou, coming on as a substitute in the 72nd minute.

On 29 August 2012, Emilios joined Olympiakos Nicosia on a season-long loan deal from APOEL. He appeared in 15 league matches and scored one goal against AEP Paphos on 9 December 2012, in Olympiakos' 3–1 home win.

The summer of 2013, he moved again on a season-long loan deal from APOEL to the Cypriot First Division side Alki Larnaca.

In September 2014, Emilios signed a contract with Aris Limassol.
