= Nikos Barboudis =

Romanian-born Greek football player

Personal information
- Full name: Nikolaos Barboudis
- Date of birth: 6 March 1989 (age 37)
- Place of birth: Cluj-Napoca, Romania
- Height: 1.81 m (5 ft 11 in)
- Position: Right back

Youth career
- 2005–2006: Ilisiakos

Senior career*
Years	Team	Apps	(Gls)
2006–2007	Ilisiakos	12	(0)
2007–2009	AEK Athens	0	(0)
2008	→Fostiras (loan)		
2008–2009	→Apollon Kalamarias (loan)		
2009–2010	→Agia Paraskevi (loan)		
2010–2011	Panthrakikos	5	(0)
2011–2012	ENAD	23	(2)
2012–2013	Ayia Napa	21	(1)
2013–2014	Ethnikos Achna	25	(4)
2016	ENAD	11	(1)
2016	Anagennisi Deryneia	13	(0)
2017	Ayia Napa	1	(0)
Total		111	(8)

International career
2006–2008	Greece U19	24	(2)
- * Club domestic league appearances and goals as of 18:46, 8 November 2024 (UTC)

Nikos Barboudis (Greek: Νίκος Μπαρμπούδης; born 6 March 1989) is a Romanian-born Greek football player who last played as a right back for Ayia Napa. His uncle, Mihai Neşu, was also a football player, who represented Romania at international level. His grandfather, Mircea Neşu was a footballer, referee, and doctor.
