= Paulo Pina =

Portuguese-born Cape Verdean footballer

Personal information
- Full name: Paulo Jorge Martins dos Santos Pina
- Date of birth: 4 January 1981 (age 45)
- Place of birth: Setúbal, Portugal
- Height: 1.87 m (6 ft 2 in)
- Position: Centre back

Youth career
- 1991–1993: Vitória Setúbal
- 1994: 1º Maio Setúbal
- 1995–1998: O Sindicato
- 1998–2000: Vitória Setúbal

Senior career*
Years	Team	Apps	(Gls)
2000–2001	Portosantense		
2001–2002	União Santiago		
2003	Moura		
2003–2004	Portomosense	33	(1)
2004–2005	Torreense	33	(0)
2005–2006	Lousada	25	(0)
2006–2007	Estoril	17	(0)
2008–2009	Al-Arabi	?	(1)
2009–2010	Carregado	17	(0)
2010–2011	Fátima	9	(0)
2011–2013	Olympiakos Nicosia	63	(1)
2013–2016	Ermis	84	(3)
2016	Olympiakos Nicosia	12	(0)
2017	Ermis	6	(0)

International career
2002	Cape Verde	2	(0)
- * Club domestic league appearances and goals as of 21 May 2017

Paulo Jorge Martins dos Santos Pina (born 4 January 1981 in Setúbal, Portugal) is a Cape Verdean professional footballer who played for Cypriot club Ermis Aradippou FC as a central defender.

== Club statistics ==
As of 16 October 2015

Club	Season	League			Cup		Other		Total	
Club	Season	Division	Apps	Goals	Apps	Goals	Apps	Goals	Apps	Goals
Portomosense	2003–04	Portuguese Second Division	33	1	1	1	—		34	2
Torreense	2004–05	Portuguese Second Division	33	0	1	0	—		34	0
Lousada	2005–06	Portuguese Second Division	25	0	1	0	—		26	0
Estoril	2006–07	Segunda Liga	17	0	2	0	—		19	0
Carregado	2009–10	Segunda Liga	17	0	1	0	—		18	0
Fátima	2010–11	Segunda Liga	9	0	4	0	—		13	0
Olympiakos Nicosia	2010–11	Cypriot First Division	11	0	0	0	—		11	0
Olympiakos Nicosia	2011–12	Cypriot First Division	24	0	3	0	—		27	0
Olympiakos Nicosia	2012–13	Cypriot First Division	27	1	2	0	—		29	1
Olympiakos Nicosia	Total		62	1	5	0	—		67	1
Ermis	2013–14	Cypriot First Division	30	0	6	0	—		36	0
Ermis	2014–15	Cypriot First Division	26	3	4	0	2 (Note: Appearances in UEFA Europa League)	0	32	3
Ermis	2015–16	Cypriot First Division	6	0	0	0	—		6	0
Ermis	Total		62	3	10	0	2	0	74	3
Career total			258	5	25	1	2	0	285	6
