= União Nogueirense F.C. =

Portuguese sports club

União Nogueirense
- Full name: União Nogueirense Futebol Clube
- Founded: 1933
- Ground: Municipal de Nogueira da Maia, Maia
- Capacity: 2,000
- League: Elite Série 1 AF Porto
- 2020–21: 13th

União Nogueirense Futebol Clube is a Portuguese sports club from Nogueira, Maia.

The men's football team plays in the Elite Série 1 AF Porto. In the early 2000s it was an elevator team between that level and the Terceira Divisão, which it contested in 2001–02, 2003–04 and 2007–08 but was relegated every time. The team also competed in the Taça de Portugal.
