= List of Cypriot football transfers summer 2014 =

This is a list of Cypriot football transfers for the 2014–15 summer transfer window by club. Only transfers of clubs in the Cypriot First Division and Cypriot Second Division are included.

The summer transfer window opened on 1 June 2014, although a few transfers took place prior to that date. The window closed at midnight on 31 August 2014. Players without a club may join one at any time, either during or in between transfer windows.

== Cypriot First Division ==
=== AEK Larnaca ===
In: Note: Flags indicate national team as defined under FIFA eligibility rules; some limited exceptions apply. Players may hold more than one non-FIFA nationality.

No.	Pos.	Nation	Player
15	DF	CYP	Constantinos Kastanas (loan return from Alki Larnaca)
26	MF	CYP	Demetris Kyprianou (loan return from Alki Larnaca)
23	GK	CYP	Zannetos Mytidis (loan return from Alki Larnaca)
24	MF	CYP	Demetris Kyriakou (loan return from Ethnikos Achna)
33	DF	CYP	Elias Charalambous (from (Greece) Levadiakos)
16	MF	ESP	Miguel Massana (from (Spain) SD Amorebieta)
8	MF	GEO	Gocha Khojava (from (Georgia (country)) Dila Gori)
29	FW	ESP	José Kanté (from (Spain) AE Prat)
3	DF	EQG	Sipo (from (Romania) Pandurii Târgu Jiu)
14	MF	MNE	Vladimir Boljević (from (Poland) Cracovia)
17	MF	CYP	Dimitris Froxylias (from Ethnikos Achna)
25	GK	ESP	Toño (from (Spain) Cultural Leonesa)
9	FW	ISR	Roberto Colautti (from Anorthosis Famagusta)
22	MF	NED	Damiano Schet (from (Netherlands) RKC Waalwijk)
7	MF	ESP	Jorge Larena (from (Spain) Recreativo Huelva)
12	MF	BRA	Vander Vieira (from (Bulgaria) Botev Plovdiv)
8	MF	ESP	Juanma Ortiz (from (Spain) Granada CF)

Out: Note: Flags indicate national team as defined under FIFA eligibility rules; some limited exceptions apply. Players may hold more than one non-FIFA nationality.

No.	Pos.	Nation	Player
28	MF	ISR	Hasan Abu Zaid (loan return to (Israel) Maccabi Tel Aviv)
3	DF	ISR	Haim Megrelashvili (released)
7	MF	POR	Hélder Castro (to (Romania) ASA Târgu Mureș)
14	MF	UKR	Vitaliy Ivanko (released)
16	MF	NED	Nassir Maachi (released)
24	MF	CYP	Demetris Kyriakou (to ASIL Lysi)
22	DF	POR	Toni Lopes (released)
23	FW	ESP	Gorka Pintado (released)
35	GK	ESP	Miguel Escalona (to (Spain) UCAM Murcia)
8	MF	GEO	Gocha Khojava (to (Russia) Sakhalin Yuzhno-Sakhalinsk)
22	MF	NED	Damiano Schet (to (Netherlands) Cambuur)

=== AEL Limassol ===
In: Note: Flags indicate national team as defined under FIFA eligibility rules; some limited exceptions apply. Players may hold more than one non-FIFA nationality.

No.	Pos.	Nation	Player
—	MF	CIV	Rodolph Amessan (loan return from Ethnikos Achna)
—	MF	GHA	Moustapha Quaynor (loan return from Alki Larnaca)
—	FW	CYP	Minas Antoniou (loan return from Nikos & Sokratis Erimis)
14	MF	CYP	Leandros Lillis (from Alki Larnaca)
8	MF	CYP	Andreas Stavrou (from Apollon Limassol)
10	MF	BRA	Diego Barcelos (from (Portugal) Nacional)
99	FW	VEN	Jaime Moreno (on loan from (Venezuela) Deportivo Anzoátegui)
2	DF	VEN	Jonathan España (from (Venezuela) Zamora FC)
44	MF	FRA	Joshua Nadeau (from (France) Ajaccio)
4	DF	CYP	Valentinos Sielis (from Anorthosis Famagusta)
50	DF	POR	Cadú (from (Romania) CFR Cluj)
11	MF	POR	Carlitos (on loan from Doxa Katokopias)
77	FW	ESP	Adrián Sardinero (from (Spain) Hércules)
17	FW	BRA	Danielzinho (from (Brazil) São Caetano)
33	DF	MTN	Diallo Guidileye (from (France) Brest)
9	FW	POL	Łukasz Gikiewicz (from (Kazakhstan) FC Tobol)
90	MF	GNB	Zézinho (on loan from (Portugal) Sporting CP)
7	FW	NGA	Marco Tagbajumi (from Ermis Aradippou)
32	FW	ROU	Alexandru Ioniță (from (Turkey) Orduspor)
61	GK	POR	Mickaël Meira (from (Portugal) Sporting CP B)

Out: Note: Flags indicate national team as defined under FIFA eligibility rules; some limited exceptions apply. Players may hold more than one non-FIFA nationality.

No.	Pos.	Nation	Player
99	FW	SRB	Andrija Kaluđerović (loan return to (China) Beijing Guoan)
22	DF	SVN	Nejc Potokar (released)
6	MF	BUL	Stanislav Genchev (to (Bulgaria) Slavia Sofia)
7	FW	POR	Jorge Monteiro (to (Portugal) Moreirense)
8	MF	GHA	Ebo Andoh (to (England) Port Vale F.C.)
29	DF	RWA	Edwin Ouon (to Ermis Aradippou)
77	MF	ANG	Dédé (to (Angola) Benfica Luanda)
15	DF	CYP	Christos Theophilou (to Aris Limassol)
31	FW	NED	Fouad Idabdelhay (to (Morocco) Wydad Casablanca)
91	FW	POR	José Embalo (to (Portugal) Beira-Mar)
95	MF	CYP	Christos Emmanouil (to AEZ Zakakiou)
28	MF	POR	Edú (to (Portugal) Beira-Mar)
80	FW	ESP	Edu Oriol (to (England) Blackpool)
—	MF	GHA	Moustapha Quaynor (on loan to Ermis Aradippou)
—	FW	CYP	Minas Antoniou (on loan to AEZ Zakakiou)
—	MF	CIV	Rodolph Amessan (to Ethnikos Achna)

=== Anorthosis Famagusta ===
In: Note: Flags indicate national team as defined under FIFA eligibility rules; some limited exceptions apply. Players may hold more than one non-FIFA nationality.

No.	Pos.	Nation	Player
—	DF	CYP	Nicos Efthimiou (loan return from Othellos Athienou)
70	MF	CYP	Adamos Hadjigeorgiou (loan return from ASIL)
36	FW	CYP	Marcos Michael (loan return from Nikos & Sokratis Erimis)
18	MF	GEO	Irakli Maisuradze (from (Malta) Valletta)
8	MF	GEO	Giorgi Aburjania (from (Georgia (country)) Lokomotivi Tbilisi)
5	DF	GHA	Razak Nuhu (from (England) Manchester City)
3	DF	ESP	Albert Serrán (from (Spain) Alcorcón)
11	FW	UKR	Yuriy Yakovenko (from (France) Ajaccio)
—	MF	CYP	Neofytos Kyriakou (from AEP Paphos)
—	MF	CYP	Luka Mihajlović (from Alki Larnaca)
17	MF	GER	Chinedu Ede (on loan from (Germany) 1. FSV Mainz 05)
10	FW	URU	Gonzalo García (from (Israel) Maccabi Tel Aviv)
9	FW	LVA	Valērijs Šabala (on loan from (Belgium) Club Brugge)
15	DF	SWE	Markus Holgersson (from (Sweden) Helsingborgs IF)
12	GK	BEL	Thomas Kaminski (on loan from (Belgium) Anderlecht)

Out: Note: Flags indicate national team as defined under FIFA eligibility rules; some limited exceptions apply. Players may hold more than one non-FIFA nationality.

No.	Pos.	Nation	Player
26	MF	CIV	Gaossou Fofana (loan return to Doxa Katokopias)
19	MF	ESP	Gonzalo García (loan return to (Israel) Maccabi Tel Aviv)
25	MF	ARG	Leandro Becerra (to (Argentina) Defensa y Justicia)
3	DF	POR	Paulo Jorge (to Doxa Katokopias)
10	MF	GEO	Shota Grigalashvili (to Omonia)
11	FW	ISR	Roberto Colautti (to AEK Larnaca)
17	MF	ISR	Amit Ben Shushan (to (Israel) Maccabi Netanya)
99	MF	ISR	Moshe Ohayon (to (Israel) Hapoel Tel Aviv)
23	DF	CYP	Valentinos Sielis (to AEL Limassol)
36	FW	CYP	Marcos Michael (to Aris Limassol)
—	DF	CYP	Nicos Efthimiou (to Othellos Athienou)
40	GK	ALB	Aldo Teqja (on loan to Elpida Xylofagou)
35	DF	CYP	Panayiotis Loizides (on loan to Nea Salamina FC)
54	MF	CYP	Theofilos Chrysochos (on loan to Ormidia)
70	MF	CYP	Adamos Hadjigeorgiou (on loan to ASIL)
37	MF	CYP	Zacharias Theodorou (on loan to Ayia Napa)

=== APOEL ===
In: Note: Flags indicate national team as defined under FIFA eligibility rules; some limited exceptions apply. Players may hold more than one non-FIFA nationality.

No.	Pos.	Nation	Player
32	MF	CYP	Emilios Panayiotou (loan return from Alki Larnaca)
40	MF	CYP	Markos Charalambous (loan return from Olympiakos Nicosia)
25	DF	CYP	Andreas Christofides (loan return from Alki Larnaca)
44	DF	CYP	Nicholas Ioannou (from (England) Manchester United U19)
14	MF	CYP	Alex Konstantinou (from Apollon Limassol)
7	MF	CYP	Georgios Efrem (from Omonia)
5	DF	BRA	Carlão (from (France) Sochaux)
30	MF	ARG	Tomás De Vincenti (from (Greece) Olympiacos)
23	DF	GRE	Anastasios Papazoglou (from (Greece) Olympiacos)
79	FW	ALG	Rafik Djebbour (from (England) Nottingham Forest)
6	DF	NOR	John Arne Riise (from (England) Fulham)

Out: Note: Flags indicate national team as defined under FIFA eligibility rules; some limited exceptions apply. Players may hold more than one non-FIFA nationality.

No.	Pos.	Nation	Player
30	MF	ARG	Tomás De Vincenti (loan return to (Greece) Olympiacos)
32	MF	CYP	Emilios Panayiotou (to (Greece) Pierikos)
17	MF	CYP	Marinos Satsias (retired)
14	DF	GRE	Christos Pipinis (to (Greece) AEL Kalloni)
27	DF	ESP	Aritz Borda (to (Thailand) Muangthong United)
77	DF	CYP	Athos Solomou (to Enosis Neon Paralimni)
6	DF	BRA	Marcelo Oliveira (to (Portugal) Moreirense)
18	MF	TUN	Selim Benachour (released)
19	DF	CYP	Marios Elia (retired)
70	FW	BRA	César Santin (to (Sweden) Kalmar FF)
95	MF	CYP	Christos Djamas (on loan to Ayia Napa)
12	FW	PAR	Aldo Adorno (to (Ukraine) Metalurh Donetsk)

=== Apollon Limassol ===
In: Note: Flags indicate national team as defined under FIFA eligibility rules; some limited exceptions apply. Players may hold more than one non-FIFA nationality.

No.	Pos.	Nation	Player
15	FW	NGA	Eze Okeuhie (loan return from Nea Salamina)
34	DF	CYP	Ioannis Efstathiou (loan return from Nea Salamina)
4	MF	CYP	Chrysis Antoniou (loan return from Nea Salamina)
19	FW	CIV	Abraham Gneki Guié (from (France) OGC Nice)
11	FW	CZE	Jan Rezek (from (Czech Republic) Viktoria Plzeň)
50	DF	POR	João Paulo (from Omonia)
8	MF	ROU	Nicolae Grigore (from (Saudi Arabia) Al-Ettifaq)
2	DF	NED	Dustley Mulder (from (Bulgaria) Levski Sofia)
9	FW	BRA	Thuram (on loan from (Brazil) Atlético Paranaense)
—	FW	BRA	Rômulo dos Santos (free agent)
22	MF	SRB	Luka Stojanović (from (Portugal) Sporting CP B)
70	MF	BRA	Farley Rosa (from (Ukraine) FC Sevastopol)
39	DF	GRE	Christos Intzidis (from (Greece) PAOK)
77	FW	CMR	Fabrice Olinga (from (Spain) Málaga CF)

Out: Note: Flags indicate national team as defined under FIFA eligibility rules; some limited exceptions apply. Players may hold more than one non-FIFA nationality.

No.	Pos.	Nation	Player
19	FW	CIV	Abraham Gneki Guié (loan return to (France) OGC Nice)
99	FW	COL	Harold Reina (loan return to (Colombia) Deportivo Cali)
3	DF	GHA	Razak Nuhu (loan return to (England) Manchester City)
18	DF	ROU	Ovidiu Dănănae (to (Romania) Universitatea Craiova)
9	FW	ESP	Roberto García (to Omonia)
11	MF	CYP	Alex Konstantinou (to APOEL)
15	FW	NGA	Eze Okeuhie (to Nea Salamina)
8	MF	CYP	Andreas Stavrou (to AEL Limassol)
34	DF	CYP	Ioannis Efstathiou (to Aris Limassol)
4	MF	CYP	Chrysis Antoniou (on loan to APEP)
92	MF	CAN	Daniel Haber (on loan to Ayia Napa)
13	DF	COL	David Mena (on loan to Ayia Napa)
55	DF	GRE	Christos Karipidis (to (Greece) Skoda Xanthi)
—	FW	BRA	Rômulo dos Santos (on loan to Ayia Napa)

=== Ayia Napa ===
In: Note: Flags indicate national team as defined under FIFA eligibility rules; some limited exceptions apply. Players may hold more than one non-FIFA nationality.

No.	Pos.	Nation	Player
8	MF	CYP	Georgios Aresti (from Enosis Neon Paralimni)
6	DF	GRE	Stergios Psianos (from Nea Salamina)
16	DF	MKD	Bojan Markovski (free agent)
21	MF	BUL	Vasil Panayotov (from (Bulgaria) Pirin Gotse Delchev)
31	GK	CYP	Andreas Kittos (from Enosis Neon Paralimni)
10	FW	CAN	Daniel Haber (on loan from Apollon Limassol)
14	MF	ARG	Fabricio Poci (from (Greece) Chania)
4	DF	ALB	Hamels Hoxha (from (Greece) Digenis Lakkomatos)
17	FW	POR	Nuno Tavares (from (Portugal) Pinhalnovense)
15	DF	COL	David Mena (on loan from Apollon Limassol)
2	MF	CYP	Christos Djamas (on loan from APOEL)
11	MF	BUL	Veselin Marchev (from (Bulgaria) Slavia Sofia)
1	GK	GRE	Grigorios Athanasiou (from (Greece) Ergotelis)
4	DF	GRE	Stavros Stathakis (from (Greece) AEK Athens)
5	MF	ISR	Nir Mansour (from Anagennisi Dherynia)
28	DF	CIV	Fousseni Bamba (from (France) UJA Maccabi)
7	FW	BRA	Marcos dos Santos (from (Greece) Acharnaikos)
18	DF	ARG	Emiliano Fusco (from (Israel) Bnei Yehuda)
12	FW	BRA	Rômulo dos Santos (on loan from Apollon Limassol)
26	MF	CYP	Zacharias Theodorou (on loan from Anorthosis Famagusta)

Out: Note: Flags indicate national team as defined under FIFA eligibility rules; some limited exceptions apply. Players may hold more than one non-FIFA nationality.

No.	Pos.	Nation	Player
1	GK	CYP	Demetris Leoni (to Pafos FC)
4	DF	BEL	Laurent Fassotte (released)
8	MF	RWA	Lewis Aniweta (to Anagennisi Dherynia)
18	FW	POR	Pio Júnior (released)
21	MF	SWE	Nino Osmanagic (to (Sweden) Norrby IF)
23	MF	CPV	Bruno Spencer (to Aris Limassol)
25	DF	CYP	Antonis Mertakkas (retired)
28	MF	ARG	Pablo Cortizo (to (Argentina) Tiro Federal)
17	MF	CYP	Demos Goumenos (to Enosis Neon Paralimni)
33	MF	CYP	Andreas Zinonos (to Karmiotissa Polemidion)
19	MF	CYP	Marios Louka (to Karmiotissa Polemidion)
11	FW	CYP	Martinos Solomou (to Enosis Neon Paralimni)
4	DF	ALB	Hamels Hoxha (released)
5	DF	CYP	Nicolas Manoli (to Ormidia)
17	FW	POR	Nuno Tavares (to (Portugal) Naval)
15	DF	CYP	Antonis Moushis (to Anagennisi Dherynia)

=== Doxa Katokopias ===
In: Note: Flags indicate national team as defined under FIFA eligibility rules; some limited exceptions apply. Players may hold more than one non-FIFA nationality.

No.	Pos.	Nation	Player
8	MF	ESP	Dani López (loan return from (Spain) Almería B)
26	MF	CIV	Gaossou Fofana (loan return from Anorthosis Famagusta)
20	MF	VEN	Héctor González (from Atlético Venezuela)
77	MF	VEN	Raúl González (from (Poland) GKS Bełchatów)
23	MF	VEN	Homero Calderón (from Atlético Venezuela)
19	DF	VEN	Giovanny Romero (from Atlético Venezuela)
5	DF	FRA	Mamaye Tounkara (from (France) AS Monaco B)
40	MF	GHA	Paul Opoku (free agent)
28	FW	CMR	Richard Emmanuel Njoh (free agent)
15	FW	GHA	Albert Ahulu (free agent)
30	MF	GHA	Livingstone Adjin (from (Venezuela) Tucanes de Amazonas)
12	FW	VEN	Christian Novoa (from (Venezuela) Carabobo FC)
10	MF	POR	Ricardo Fernandes (from Omonia)
21	DF	ESP	Álvaro Ocaña (from (Spain) Villarreal C)
17	MF	CYP	Pantelis Vasiliou (from Olympiakos Nicosia)
22	FW	CYP	Kyriacos Vasiliou (from Olympiakos Nicosia)
5	MF	VEN	Elias Romero (free agent)
1	GK	BRA	Luiz Fernando (from (Brazil) Red Bull Brasil)
3	DF	POR	Paulo Jorge (from Anorthosis Famagusta)
14	DF	POR	Paulo Alves (from (Portugal) AD Nogueirense)
9	FW	ARG	Adrián Fernández (from (Israel) Maccabi Petah Tikva)
6	DF	GRE	Stefanos Siontis (from (Greece) Veria)
4	DF	ESP	Ferrán Monzó (from (Spain) Espanyol B)
7	MF	ESP	José Higón (from (Spain) Levante B)
11	FW	HAI	Gary Ambroise (from (Belgium) Tubize)
99	GK	CYP	Evagoras Hadjifrangiskou (from Omonia)
87	GK	GRE	Giannis Siderakis (from (Greece) AEL Kalloni)

Out: Note: Flags indicate national team as defined under FIFA eligibility rules; some limited exceptions apply. Players may hold more than one non-FIFA nationality.

No.	Pos.	Nation	Player
26	MF	CIV	Gaossou Fofana (to Omonia)
40	MF	CYP	Giorgos Economides (to Omonia)
6	MF	ESP	Rodri (to Omonia)
19	FW	BRA	Leandro (to (Portugal) Moreirense)
3	DF	ESP	Pedro Baquero (to (Spain) Lleida Esportiu)
4	DF	ESP	Dani Tortolero (released)
12	GK	ESP	Toni (to (Spain) CD Guadalajara)
20	DF	ESP	Pablo Suárez (released)
23	MF	SRB	Miloš Pavlović (to (Serbia) Voždovac)
27	MF	POR	Pedrinho (released)
28	FW	UKR	Vitalii Doroshenko (released)
77	FW	ESP	Pedrito (to Nea Salamina)
90	GK	GEO	Giorgi Makaridze (to (Portugal) Feirense)
5	DF	POR	Abel Pereira (to (Portugal) Varzim)
38	MF	BRA	Gleison (to Nea Salamina)
11	MF	POR	Carlitos (on loan to AEL Limassol)
9	FW	ARG	Adrián Fernández (to (Israel) Maccabi Herzliya)
17	MF	CYP	Pantelis Vasiliou (on loan to PAEEK)
22	FW	CYP	Kyriacos Vasiliou (on loan to PAEEK)
40	MF	GHA	Paul Opoku (released)
5	DF	FRA	Mamaye Tounkara (released)
19	DF	VEN	Giovanny Romero (released)
93	GK	CYP	Nicolas Anastasiou (on loan to Olympiakos Nicosia)
1	GK	BRA	Luiz Fernando (released)

=== Ermis Aradippou ===
In: Note: Flags indicate national team as defined under FIFA eligibility rules; some limited exceptions apply. Players may hold more than one non-FIFA nationality.

No.	Pos.	Nation	Player
—	FW	POR	Bruno Luz (loan return from PAEEK)
—	MF	POR	Ivan Forbes (from AEK Kouklia)
23	FW	ENG	Hakeem Araba (from AEK Kouklia)
93	DF	CYP	Martinos Christofi (from Alki Larnaca)
5	DF	GHA	Daniel Addo (from (Ukraine) Zorya Luhansk)
10	MF	GEO	Giorgi Iluridze (free agent)
9	FW	ROU	Mircea Axente (from (Romania) Viitorul Constanța)
77	MF	BRA	Douglas Packer (from (Brazil) Treze)
7	FW	CYP	Georgios Tofas (from Enosis Neon Paralimni)
1	GK	MKD	Martin Bogatinov (from (Romania) Steaua București)
83	MF	ESP	Rubén Palazuelos (from (England) Yeovil Town)
6	DF	RWA	Edwin Ouon (from AEL Limassol)
80	FW	BRA	Jonatas Belusso (from (Brazil) Treze)
11	FW	NGA	Ifeanyi Onyilo (on loan from (Serbia) Red Star Belgrade)
—	FW	FRA	Yannick Kamanan (from (Azerbaijan) Gabala FK)
24	MF	GHA	Moustapha Quaynor (on loan from AEL Limassol)
27	FW	MKD	Besart Ibraimi (from Enosis Neon Paralimni)
84	GK	CYP	Demetris Stylianou (from Nea Salamina)

Out: Note: Flags indicate national team as defined under FIFA eligibility rules; some limited exceptions apply. Players may hold more than one non-FIFA nationality.

No.	Pos.	Nation	Player
1	GK	GRE	Giannis Arabatzis (to (Romania) Astra Giurgiu)
10	MF	MKD	Armend Alimi (to (North Macedonia) KF Shkëndija)
24	DF	CYP	Andreas Constantinou (released)
7	MF	BRA	Césinha (to (Brazil) Brasiliense)
2	DF	GEO	Levan Maghradze (to Karmiotissa Polemidion)
9	FW	POR	Henrique (to Nea Salamina)
81	MF	POR	Manú (to (Portugal) Vitória Setúbal)
38	MF	CYP	Marios Poutziouris (to Othellos Athienou)
27	GK	CYP	Marios Frantzis (to MEAP Nisou)
30	MF	CYP	Iakovos Kyriacou (to MEAP Nisou)
—	FW	POR	Bruno Luz (to Anagennisi Dherynia)
—	MF	POR	Ivan Forbes (to Pafos FC)
11	FW	NGA	Marco Tagbajumi (to AEL Limassol)
23	FW	ENG	Hakeem Araba (to (Greece) Panthrakikos)
5	DF	GHA	Daniel Addo (released)
10	MF	GEO	Giorgi Iluridze (to (Georgia (country)) FC Zestafoni)
9	FW	ROU	Mircea Axente (to (Romania) ASA Târgu Mureș)
—	FW	FRA	Yannick Kamanan (released)
13	FW	CYP	Nicolas Alexiou (on loan to Alki Oroklini)

=== Ethnikos Achna ===
In: Note: Flags indicate national team as defined under FIFA eligibility rules; some limited exceptions apply. Players may hold more than one non-FIFA nationality.

No.	Pos.	Nation	Player
16	DF	CYP	Elpidoforos Elia (free agent)
20	MF	AUT	Thomas Prager (from (Austria) Wiener Viktoria)
5	MF	BRA	Eduardo Pincelli (from Aris Limassol)
33	GK	CYP	Giorgos Loizou (from Chalkanoras Idaliou)
11	FW	BRA	Juninho (from (Uruguay) Villa Teresa)
8	FW	BRA	Ibson de Melo (from (Brazil) Potiguar Mossoró)
19	FW	CYP	Ioannis Chadjivasilis (from Omonia)
7	FW	CYP	Rafael Yiangoudakis (from Enosis Neon Parekklisia)
23	DF	AUT	Andreas Dober (from (Austria) St. Pölten)
9	FW	BRA	Valdo (from (Brazil) Ituano)
17	MF	GRE	Panagiotis Giannopoulos (from (Greece) Panserraikos)
25	DF	NGA	Ganiu Ogungbe (from Omonia)
3	DF	BRA	Everton Bezerra (from (Brazil) Resende)
42	MF	ENG	Krasniqi Kreshnic (from Ormidia)
15	FW	ENG	Jamie Moore (from Ormidia)
2	DF	FRA	Mamadou Wague (from (Hungary) Puskás Academy)
99	FW	BRA	Jone (from (Brazil) Esporte Clube Internacional)
77	MF	CIV	Rodolph Amessan (from AEL Limassol)

Out: Note: Flags indicate national team as defined under FIFA eligibility rules; some limited exceptions apply. Players may hold more than one non-FIFA nationality.

No.	Pos.	Nation	Player
30	MF	CYP	Demetris Kyriakou (loan return to AEK Larnaca)
77	MF	CIV	Rodolph Amessan (loan return to AEL Limassol)
3	DF	BRA	Marco Aurélio (to Nea Salamina)
15	FW	NGA	Chidi Onyemah (to Nea Salamina)
32	MF	CYP	Antonis Katsis (to Nea Salamina)
11	MF	POR	Silas (to (Portugal) Atlético CP)
22	MF	SRB	Predrag Lazić (to (Serbia) Napredak Kruševac)
16	MF	POR	Hugo Soares (to (Portugal) CD Cinfães)
82	FW	BRA	Rafael Ledesma (to (Malta) Birkirkara)
99	FW	SVN	Miran Burgič (to (Slovenia) Olimpija)
8	DF	GRE	Nikos Barboudis (released)
40	GK	CYP	Kyriacos Ioannou (released)
80	MF	CYP	Dimitris Froxylias (to AEK Larnaca)
23	DF	SVN	Milan Anđelković (to (Poland) Olimpia Grudziądz)
9	FW	CYP	Christoforos Xenofontos (to Ethnikos Assia)
12	GK	CYP	Pavlos Pitsillidis (to Chalkanoras Idaliou)

=== Nea Salamina ===
In: Note: Flags indicate national team as defined under FIFA eligibility rules; some limited exceptions apply. Players may hold more than one non-FIFA nationality.

No.	Pos.	Nation	Player
92	MF	GRE	Angelos Pournos (loan return from Karmiotissa Polemidion)
30	DF	CYP	Modestos Sotiriou (loan return from Anagennisi Dherynia)
16	DF	ALB	Kostandin Ndoni (loan return from Othellos Athienou)
50	DF	LBR	Solomon Grimes (free agent)
3	DF	BRA	Marco Aurélio (from Ethnikos Achna)
34	DF	BRA	Leandro Silva (free agent)
15	FW	NGA	Chidi Onyemah (from Ethnikos Achna)
19	FW	CYP	Stavrinos Constantinou (from Alki Larnaca)
90	DF	ITA	Mattia Cinquini (from Enosis Neon Paralimni)
83	GK	ENG	Corrin Brooks-Meade (from Omonia)
11	FW	NGA	Eze Okeuhie (from Apollon Limassol)
1	GK	CYP	Demetris Stylianou (from Alki Larnaca)
9	FW	POR	Henrique (from Ermis Aradippou)
8	FW	CYP	Achilleas Vasiliou (from THOI Lakatamia)
21	MF	GRE	Giorgos Lambropoulos (from (Greece) Levadiakos)
6	MF	CIV	Siaka Bamba (from (Portugal) G.D. Chaves)
12	DF	CYP	Kyriacos Kyriacou (from Anagennisi Dherynia)
32	MF	CYP	Antonis Katsis (from Ethnikos Achna)
38	MF	BRA	Gleison Vilela (from Doxa Katokopias)
7	FW	ESP	Pedrito (from Doxa Katokopias)
33	MF	POR	Gabi (from (Portugal) Penafiel)
1	GK	ISR	Ram Strauss (from (Israel) Maccabi Haifa)
22	MF	SRB	Miloš Krstić (from (Serbia) Radnički Niš)
35	DF	CYP	Panayiotis Loizides (on loan from Anorthosis Famagusta)

Out: Note: Flags indicate national team as defined under FIFA eligibility rules; some limited exceptions apply. Players may hold more than one non-FIFA nationality.

No.	Pos.	Nation	Player
15	FW	NGA	Eze Okeuhie (loan return to Apollon Limassol)
29	FW	CMR	Justin Mengolo (loan return to Omonia)
4	MF	CYP	Chrysis Antoniou (loan return to Apollon Limassol)
34	DF	CYP	Ioannis Efstathiou (loan return to Apollon Limassol)
1	GK	LTU	Ernestas Šetkus (to (Greece) Kerkyra)
3	MF	CYP	Siniša Dobrašinović (retired)
44	DF	FRA	Kenny Gillet (released)
8	MF	CRO	Ivan Ćurjurić (to (Greece) Lamia)
17	MF	TOG	Jerome Agbo (to Omonia Aradippou)
20	MF	GRE	Alexandros Kalogeris (loan return to (Greece) Panetolikos)
28	MF	POR	Hélio Roque (to (Angola) Progresso do Sambizanga)
89	DF	GRE	Stergios Psianos (to Ayia Napa)
40	GK	CYP	Andreas Photiou (to Omonia Aradippou)
21	MF	CYP	Giorgos Panagi (to Omonia Aradippou)
7	FW	CYP	Elias Vattis (to Enosis Neon Paralimni)
25	DF	CRO	Dino Škvorc (to (Romania) Universitatea Cluj)
30	MF	CYP	Modestos Sotiriou (to Anagennisi Dherynia)
14	FW	CYP	Stamatis Pantos (to Pafos FC)
92	MF	GRE	Angelos Pournos (to (Greece) Paniliakos)
16	DF	ALB	Kostandin Ndoni (to (Albania) Apolonia Fier)
1	GK	CYP	Demetris Stylianou (to Ermis Aradippou)
8	FW	CYP	Achilleas Vasiliou (on loan to Anagennisi Dherynia)
14	FW	CYP	Timotheos Pavlou (on loan to Digenis Oroklinis)

=== Omonia ===
In: Note: Flags indicate national team as defined under FIFA eligibility rules; some limited exceptions apply. Players may hold more than one non-FIFA nationality.

No.	Pos.	Nation	Player
4	DF	CYP	Demetris Moulazimis (loan return from Enosis Neon Paralimni)
29	FW	CMR	Justin Mengolo (loan return from Nea Salamina)
80	MF	CYP	Fanos Katelaris (loan return from Alki Larnaca)
81	MF	CYP	Stavros Christoudias (loan return from Alki Larnaca)
—	MF	CYP	Andreas Frangeskou (loan return from Alki Larnaca)
26	MF	CIV	Gaossou Fofana (from Doxa Katokopias)
33	GK	CYP	Antonis Georgallides (from (Greece) Platanias)
23	MF	CYP	Giorgos Economides (from Doxa Katokopias)
6	MF	ESP	Rodri (from Doxa Katokopias)
1	GK	CYP	Constantinos Panagi (from Olympiakos Nicosia)
9	FW	ESP	Roberto García (from Apollon Limassol)
24	DF	GEO	Levan Kakubava (from (Georgia (country)) Spartaki-Tskhinvali)
7	FW	CYP	Marios Demetriou (from Alki Larnaca)
10	MF	GEO	Shota Grigalashvili (from Anorthosis Famagusta)
16	MF	POR	Cristóvão Ramos (from (Bulgaria) Levski Sofia)
36	DF	CYP	Jack Sammoutis (from (England) Margate)
27	DF	CRO	Ivan Lovrić (from (Hungary) Budapest Honvéd)
3	DF	GEO	Ucha Lobjanidze (from (Ukraine) FC Dnipro)
15	DF	CYP	Pantelis Konomis (from Alki Larnaca)
20	MF	CYP	Gerasimos Fylaktou (from Alki Larnaca)
5	DF	SRB	Milan Stepanov (free agent)
39	FW	BEN	Mickaël Poté (from (Germany) Dynamo Dresden)
89	DF	GER	Jonas Acquistapace (from (Germany) VfL Bochum)
30	MF	SVN	Andraž Kirm (from (Netherlands) FC Groningen)

Out: Note: Flags indicate national team as defined under FIFA eligibility rules; some limited exceptions apply. Players may hold more than one non-FIFA nationality.

No.	Pos.	Nation	Player
30	FW	MLT	André Schembri (to (Germany) FSV Frankfurt)
23	DF	POR	João Paulo Andrade (to Apollon Limassol)
29	FW	CMR	Justin Mengolo (to (Romania) Universitatea Cluj)
33	FW	CYP	Ioannis Chadjivasilis (to Ethnikos Achna)
7	MF	CYP	Georgios Efrem (to APOEL)
4	DF	ESP	José Cervera (to (Spain) Real Murcia)
83	GK	ENG	Corrin Brooks-Meade (to Nea Salamina)
3	MF	POR	Ricardo Fernandes (to Doxa Katokopias)
25	DF	NGA	Ganiu Ogungbe (to Ethnikos Achna)
20	MF	CPV	Platini (to (Bulgaria) CSKA Sofia)
99	GK	CYP	Evagoras Hadjifrangiskou (to Doxa Katokopias)
77	FW	USA	Tony Taylor (to (United States) New England Revolution)
2	DF	NGA	Rasheed Alabi (to (Portugal) Leixões)
27	DF	CRO	Ivan Lovrić (to (Hungary) Kecskeméti TE)
13	DF	FRA	Sofyane Cherfa (to (Greece) Panthrakikos)
96	MF	CYP	Panayiotis Therapontos (on loan to Olympiakos Nicosia)
49	MF	CYP	Fanos Katelaris (on loan to Olympiakos Nicosia)
—	MF	CYP	Andreas Frangeskou (on loan to PAEEK)
11	MF	BRA	Alípio (to (Greece) Apollon Smyrnis)
24	DF	GEO	Levan Kakubava (to (Georgia (country)) FC Samtredia)

=== Othellos Athienou ===
In: Note: Flags indicate national team as defined under FIFA eligibility rules; some limited exceptions apply. Players may hold more than one non-FIFA nationality.

No.	Pos.	Nation	Player
32	DF	CYP	Evangelos Kyriacou (from Olympiakos Nicosia)
38	MF	CYP	Marios Poutziouris (from Ermis Aradippou)
89	GK	GEO	Roin Kvaskhvadze (from (Georgia (country)) Torpedo Kutaisi)
8	MF	GEO	Levan Khmaladze (from (Georgia (country)) Chikhura Sachkhere)
20	MF	ROU	Marian Neagu (on loan from (Romania) Concordia Chiajna)
18	FW	ARG	Jesús Vera (from (Argentina) Godoy Cruz)
3	DF	CYP	Nicos Efthimiou (from Anorthosis Famagusta)
4	DF	ESP	Alain Álvarez (from (Spain) Sporting de Gijón B)
16	DF	ESP	Dennis Nieblas (from (Portugal) Trofense)
30	MF	GEO	Elguja Grigalashvili (from (Georgia (country)) Dinamo Tbilisi)
70	FW	BRA	Thiago Ferreira (from (Brazil) Mirassol)
9	FW	TUN	Ismail Sassi (from (France) US Raon-l'Étape)
11	DF	CYP	Fotis Kezos (from (Greece) AEK Athens)

Out: Note: Flags indicate national team as defined under FIFA eligibility rules; some limited exceptions apply. Players may hold more than one non-FIFA nationality.

No.	Pos.	Nation	Player
16	DF	ALB	Kostandin Ndoni (loan return to Nea Salamina)
3	DF	CYP	Nicos Efthimiou (loan return to Anorthosis Famagusta)
11	FW	HUN	Lajos Terjék (to Anagennisi Dherynia)
5	DF	CYP	Orthodoxos Ioannou (to Omonia Aradippou)
13	MF	POR	Moisés Indequi (released)
78	FW	POR	Ângelo Henriques (to Ormidia)
8	FW	CYP	Giannos Ioannou (to Alki Oroklini)
32	MF	CYP	Spyros Spyrou (to Alki Oroklini)

== Cypriot Second Division ==
=== AEZ Zakakiou ===
In: Note: Flags indicate national team as defined under FIFA eligibility rules; some limited exceptions apply. Players may hold more than one non-FIFA nationality.

No.	Pos.	Nation	Player
10	MF	CYP	Neophytos Hadjispyrou (from Karmiotissa Polemidion)
24	FW	CYP	Andreas Ioannou (from Amathus Agiou Tychona)
3	DF	CYP	Antonis Eleftheriou (from Amathus Agiou Tychona)
29	MF	CYP	Andreas Mammides (from Nikos & Sokratis Erimis)
91	MF	CYP	Marios Demetriou (from Amathus Agiou Tychona)
19	GK	CYP	Charalambos Kairinos (from AEK Kouklia)
77	FW	CYP	Savvas Kyprou (from Karmiotissa Polemidion)
4	MF	CYP	Andreas Theofanous (free agent)
21	MF	CYP	Christos Emmanouil (from AEL Limassol)
—	MF	COL	Jhonatan Rojas (free agent)
17	MF	CYP	Kyriacos Panagi (on loan from Apollon Limassol U19)
7	MF	BUL	Simeon Ganchev (from (Bulgaria) Spartak Varna)
99	FW	CYP	Minas Antoniou (on loan from AEL Limassol)
14	MF	CYP	Pavlos Pafitis (from Konstantios & Evripidis Trachoniou)
9	FW	GRE	Taxiarchis Thanelas (from Aris Limassol)
55	FW	SLE	Ishmael Danjaji (free agent)
26	GK	CYP	Velis Sygkrasitis (from Konstantios & Evripidis Trachoniou)
6	MF	CYP	Sergios Panayiotou (on loan from Aris Limassol)

Out: Note: Flags indicate national team as defined under FIFA eligibility rules; some limited exceptions apply. Players may hold more than one non-FIFA nationality.

No.	Pos.	Nation	Player
2	DF	CYP	Demos Sokratous (to Amathus Agiou Tychona)
6	MF	CYP	Loizos Aristodemou (to Digenis Akritas Ypsona)
1	GK	CYP	Michalis Kokkinos (to Enosis Neon Parekklisia)
7	FW	CYP	Grigoris Orthodoxou (to Digenis Akritas Ypsona)
9	FW	CYP	Iasonas Kyriacou (released)
10	MF	CYP	Marinos Georgiou (retired)
24	FW	CYP	Giorgos Kavazis (released)
77	MF	GRE	Christos Oxyzoglou (released)

=== Anagennisi Dherynia ===
In: Note: Flags indicate national team as defined under FIFA eligibility rules; some limited exceptions apply. Players may hold more than one non-FIFA nationality.

No.	Pos.	Nation	Player
11	FW	HUN	Lajos Terjék (from Othellos Athienou)
20	DF	CYP	Anastasios Efstathiou (from Elpida Xylofagou)
9	FW	CYP	Demos Demosthenous (from Omonia Aradippou)
1	GK	POR	Jorge (from AEK Kouklia)
8	MF	RWA	Lewis Aniweta (from Ayia Napa)
77	FW	POR	Bruno Luz (from Ermis Aradippou)
7	FW	NED	Dion Esajas (from ENAD Polis Chrysochous)
16	DF	CYP	Modestos Sotiriou (from Nea Salamina)
80	MF	GRE	Christos Chatzipantelides (from THOI Lakatamia)
23	DF	CYP	Demos Demosthenous (from Achyronas Liopetri)
8	FW	CYP	Achilleas Vasiliou (on loan from Nea Salamina)
55	DF	CYP	Antonis Moushis (from Ayia Napa)

Out: Note: Flags indicate national team as defined under FIFA eligibility rules; some limited exceptions apply. Players may hold more than one non-FIFA nationality.

No.	Pos.	Nation	Player
16	DF	CYP	Modestos Sotiriou (loan return to Nea Salamina)
12	DF	CYP	Kyriacos Kyriacou (to Nea Salamina)
8	FW	MAR	Hicham Chirouf (to (France) Saint-Louis Neuweg)
9	FW	CYP	Andreas Kyprianou (to Enosis Neon Paralimni)
20	MF	GRE	Panayiotis Linardos (to Omonia Aradippou)
46	DF	GRE	Stavros Nicolaou (to (Greece) Kallithea)
90	FW	CYP	Charalambos Demosthenous (to Aris Limassol)
14	MF	ISR	Nir Mansour (to Ayia Napa)
7	FW	CYP	Prodromos Therapontos (to Omonia Aradippou)
8	MF	RWA	Lewis Aniweta (to APEP)
91	GK	CYP	Giorgos Papadopoulos (to APEP)
4	DF	CYP	Christos Shailis (released)
10	FW	CYP	Christoforos Christofi (to Elpida Xylofagou)
17	DF	CYP	Marios Laifis (released)

=== APEP Pitsilia ===
In: Note: Flags indicate national team as defined under FIFA eligibility rules; some limited exceptions apply. Players may hold more than one non-FIFA nationality.

No.	Pos.	Nation	Player
15	DF	CYP	Sotiris Finiris (from PAEEK)
91	GK	CYP	Giorgos Papadopoulos (from Anagennisi Dherynia)
69	MF	RWA	Lewis Aniweta (from Anagennisi Dherynia)
9	FW	CYP	Giorgos Neophytou (from Karmiotissa Polemidion)
17	FW	GRE	Ioannis Ntiniotakis (from (Greece) Iraklis Psachna)
10	MF	NGA	Joshua Izuchukwu (from Nikos & Sokratis Erimis)
11	FW	NGA	Boris Odwong (from (Greece) Apollon Kalamarias)
28	MF	CYP	Chrysis Antoniou (on loan from Apollon Limassol)

Out: Note: Flags indicate national team as defined under FIFA eligibility rules; some limited exceptions apply. Players may hold more than one non-FIFA nationality.

No.	Pos.	Nation	Player
33	FW	CYP	Andreas Christou (to Enosis Neon Parekklisia)
32	FW	CYP	Michalis Sykas (to Aris Limassol)
35	FW	CYP	Sotiris Argyri (to Kourris Erimis)
3	DF	CYP	Constantinos Demetriou (to Amathus Agiou Tychona)
26	DF	ENG	Oliver Emsden (released)
14	MF	CYP	Christos Nikolaou (to Enosis Neon Parekklisia)

=== Aris Limassol ===
In: Note: Flags indicate national team as defined under FIFA eligibility rules; some limited exceptions apply. Players may hold more than one non-FIFA nationality.

No.	Pos.	Nation	Player
30	MF	CYP	Simos Krassas (free agent)
1	GK	CYP	Simos Tsiakkas (from Nikos & Sokratis Erimis)
32	FW	CYP	Michalis Sykas (from APEP)
3	DF	CYP	Ioannis Efstathiou (from Apollon Limassol)
90	FW	CYP	Charalambos Demosthenous (from Anagennisi Dherynia)
9	FW	CYP	Marcos Michael (from Anorthosis Famagusta)
18	MF	CPV	Bruno Spencer (from Ayia Napa)
—	FW	GRE	Taxiarchis Thanelas (from ENAD Polis Chrysochous)
10	MF	ROU	Maximilian Nicu (from (Romania) Universitatea Cluj)
77	FW	GRE	Markos Maragoudakis (from (Greece) A.O. Chania)
21	DF	CYP	Christos Theophilou (from AEL Limassol)
5	DF	ROU	Bogdan Panait (from (Romania) Dunărea Galați)
33	GK	SVN	Gregor Fink (from (Slovenia) NK Zavrč)
23	FW	CRO	Hrvoje Tokić (from (Croatia) HNK Cibalia)
22	DF	PAR	Ivo Carosini (from (Spain) Atlético Madrid C)
17	MF	CYP	Emilios Panayiotou (from (Greece) Pierikos)

Out: Note: Flags indicate national team as defined under FIFA eligibility rules; some limited exceptions apply. Players may hold more than one non-FIFA nationality.

No.	Pos.	Nation	Player
13	MF	BIH	Dusan Kerkez (retired)
8	MF	CPV	Edson Cruz (released)
39	FW	NGA	Emmanuel Okoye (released)
33	DF	ARG	Maximiliano Oliva (to (Argentina) Estudiantes La Plata)
3	DF	BRA	Douglas (released)
77	FW	FIN	Juha Hakola (to (Finland) KuPS)
87	MF	SWE	Christer Youssef (released)
30	FW	BRA	Thuram (loan return to (Brazil) Atlético Paranaense)
83	MF	BRA	Eduardo Pincelli (to Ethnikos Achna)
9	FW	ROU	Mihai Dina (to (Romania) Concordia Chiajna)
27	FW	MKD	Filip Timov (to (Romania) Concordia Chiajna)
5	MF	NED	Tom Daemen (to (Netherlands) N.E.C. Nijmegen)
21	DF	ITA	Davide Grassi (to (Germany) VfL Osnabrück)
29	GK	HUN	Zoltán Kovács (to (Romania) Dinamo București)
—	FW	GRE	Taxiarchis Thanelas (to AEZ Zakakiou)
12	MF	CYP	Sergios Panayiotou (on loan to AEZ Zakakiou)

=== Digenis Voroklinis ===
In: Note: Flags indicate national team as defined under FIFA eligibility rules; some limited exceptions apply. Players may hold more than one non-FIFA nationality.

No.	Pos.	Nation	Player
8	FW	CYP	Constantinos Nicolaides (from ASIL)
3	MF	CYP	Rafaellos Georgiou (from Chalkanoras Idaliou)
10	FW	CYP	Costas Constantinou (from Ethnikos Assia)
26	MF	MDA	Roman Bolbocian (from Elpida Xylofagou)
9	FW	CYP	Timotheos Pavlou (on loan from Nea Salamina)

Out: Note: Flags indicate national team as defined under FIFA eligibility rules; some limited exceptions apply. Players may hold more than one non-FIFA nationality.

No.	Pos.	Nation	Player
22	FW	NGA	David Opara (to ENAD Polis Chrysochous)
39	FW	CYP	Constantinos Constantinou (to Elpida Xylofagou)

=== Elpida Xylofagou ===
In: Note: Flags indicate national team as defined under FIFA eligibility rules; some limited exceptions apply. Players may hold more than one non-FIFA nationality.

No.	Pos.	Nation	Player
—	GK	ARG	Ramiro González (from Omonia Aradippou)
18	GK	CYP	Charis Liotatis (from Onisilos Sotira)
19	MF	CYP	Manolis Manoli (from Ormidia)
7	FW	CYP	Panayiotis Pontikos (from Omonia Aradippou)
13	MF	CYP	Tziovanis Kastanos (from Ormidia)
10	MF	CYP	Charalambos Loizou (from Onisilos Sotira)
1	GK	ALB	Aldo Teqja (on loan from Anorthosis Famagusta)
21	DF	ANG	João Comboio (from Omonia Aradippou)
23	FW	CYP	Constantinos Constantinou (from Digenis Oroklinis)
11	FW	CYP	Christoforos Christofi (from Anagennisi Dherynia)
14	DF	CYP	Costas Pouros (from Onisilos Sotira)
8	FW	CYP	Christos Pierettis (from Enosis Neon Paralimni)

Out: Note: Flags indicate national team as defined under FIFA eligibility rules; some limited exceptions apply. Players may hold more than one non-FIFA nationality.

No.	Pos.	Nation	Player
1	GK	CYP	Panagiotis Kythreotis (to Alki Oroklini)
14	DF	CYP	Anastasios Efstathiou (to Anagennisi Dherynia)
12	MF	CYP	Spyros Machattou (to PO Xylotymbou)
—	GK	ARG	Ramiro González (retired)
69	MF	MDA	Roman Bolbocian (to Digenis Voroklinis)

=== ENAD Polis Chrysochous ===
In: Note: Flags indicate national team as defined under FIFA eligibility rules; some limited exceptions apply. Players may hold more than one non-FIFA nationality.

No.	Pos.	Nation	Player
22	DF	CYP	Christos Palates (from Akritas Chloraka)
21	FW	CYP	Giorgos Georgiou (from Nikos & Sokratis Erimis)
16	GK	CYP	Michalis Aristotelous (from AEK Kouklia)
87	FW	CYP	Savvas Pikramenos (from AEK Kouklia)
11	FW	CYP	Achilleas Michael (from AEK Kouklia)
9	FW	NGA	David Opara (from Digenis Oroklinis)
20	MF	LVA	Andrejs Perepļotkins (from (Armenia) Ararat Yerevan)
17	FW	BUL	Vladislav Mirchev (from (Bulgaria) Spartak Varna)

Out: Note: Flags indicate national team as defined under FIFA eligibility rules; some limited exceptions apply. Players may hold more than one non-FIFA nationality.

No.	Pos.	Nation	Player
33	FW	GRE	Pantelis Alexandridis (released)
9	FW	GRE	Taxiarchis Thanelas (to Aris Limassol)
11	FW	NED	Dion Esajas (to Anagennisi Dherynia)

=== Enosis Neon Paralimni ===
In: Note: Flags indicate national team as defined under FIFA eligibility rules; some limited exceptions apply. Players may hold more than one non-FIFA nationality.

No.	Pos.	Nation	Player
17	MF	CYP	Demos Goumenos (from Ayia Napa)
7	FW	BUL	Kostadin Bashov (from (Bulgaria) Pirin Gotse Delchev)
9	FW	CYP	Andreas Kyprianou (from Anagennisi Dherynia)
5	DF	CYP	Stelios Parpas (free agent)
4	FW	BUL	Rangel Abushev (from (Bulgaria) Slavia Sofia)
24	FW	CYP	Martinos Solomou (from Ayia Napa)
3	DF	CYP	Adamos Pierettis (from (Australia) Sutherland Sharks)
8	MF	NED	Pim Bouwman (from (Finland) Inter Turku)
19	GK	GRE	Georgios Ambaris (from (Greece) PAS Giannina)
2	DF	GRE	Grigoris Papazaharias (from (Greece) Apollon Smyrnis)
10	FW	CYP	Elias Vattis (from Nea Salamina)
28	MF	GRE	Vasilis Vallianos (from (Greece) A.O. Chania)
77	DF	CYP	Athos Solomou (from APOEL)

Out: Note: Flags indicate national team as defined under FIFA eligibility rules; some limited exceptions apply. Players may hold more than one non-FIFA nationality.

No.	Pos.	Nation	Player
29	DF	CYP	Demetris Moulazimis (loan return to Omonia)
77	MF	POR	Julien Fernandes (released)
18	DF	CYP	Petros Sotiriou (released)
23	MF	ISR	Zion Tzemah (to (Israel) Hapoel Acre)
8	MF	ZAM	William Njobvu (released)
19	MF	ESP	Igor Angulo (to (Greece) Apollon Smyrnis)
89	DF	CRO	Dino Gavrić (to (Hungary) Dunaújváros)
27	FW	MKD	Besart Ibraimi (to Ermis Aradippou)
4	DF	ESP	Javi Cantero (to (Spain) Mirandés)
90	DF	ITA	Mattia Cinquini (to Nea Salamina)
88	MF	CYP	Georgios Aresti (to Ayia Napa)
10	FW	CYP	Georgios Tofas (to Ermis Aradippou)
22	GK	CYP	Andreas Kittos (to Ayia Napa)
39	FW	CYP	Christos Pierettis (to Elpida Xylofagou)

=== Enosis Neon Parekklisia ===
In: Note: Flags indicate national team as defined under FIFA eligibility rules; some limited exceptions apply. Players may hold more than one non-FIFA nationality.

No.	Pos.	Nation	Player
4	DF	CYP	Stefanos Erotokritou (from Digenis Akritas Ypsona)
5	DF	CYP	Nicos Sofokleous (from Nikos & Sokratis Erimis)
33	FW	CYP	Andreas Christou (from APEP)
11	MF	CYP	Adamos Efstathiou (from PAEEK)
13	DF	CYP	Kyriacos Michaelides (from Akritas Chloraka)
1	GK	CYP	Michalis Kokkinos (from AEZ Zakakiou)
8	MF	CYP	Christos Nikolaou (from APEP)
20	MF	ALG	Nasser Menassel (free agent)

Out: Note: Flags indicate national team as defined under FIFA eligibility rules; some limited exceptions apply. Players may hold more than one non-FIFA nationality.

No.	Pos.	Nation	Player
18	GK	CYP	Aleksandar Špoljarić (released)
28	FW	CYP	Rafael Yiangoudakis (to Ethnikos Achna)
23	FW	CYP	Marios Pastellis (to Karmiotissa Polemidion)
1	GK	CYP	Andreas Theodorou (to Amathus Agiou Tychona)
8	MF	CYP	Rafael Zavou (to Amathus Agiou Tychona)
3	DF	CYP	Lambros Kantzias (to Amathus Agiou Tychona)

=== Karmiotissa Polemidion ===
In: Note: Flags indicate national team as defined under FIFA eligibility rules; some limited exceptions apply. Players may hold more than one non-FIFA nationality.

No.	Pos.	Nation	Player
8	MF	POR	Zé Vítor (from Nikos & Sokratis Erimis)
81	DF	CYP	Loizos Kakoyiannis (free agent)
16	DF	GEO	Levan Maghradze (from Ermis Aradippou)
9	FW	CYP	Marios Pastellis (from Enosis Neon Parekklisia)
33	MF	CYP	Andreas Zinonos (from Ayia Napa)
34	GK	BUL	Abdi Abdikov (from (Bulgaria) Pirin Gotse Delchev)
30	MF	CYP	Giannis Pachipis (from Olympiakos Nicosia)
21	MF	GER	Christopher Griebsch (from (United States) Hofstra Pride)
19	MF	CYP	Marios Louka (from Ayia Napa)
55	FW	CYP	Demetris Theofanous (from Omonia Aradippou)

Out: Note: Flags indicate national team as defined under FIFA eligibility rules; some limited exceptions apply. Players may hold more than one non-FIFA nationality.

No.	Pos.	Nation	Player
21	MF	GRE	Angelos Pournos (loan return to Nea Salamina)
8	MF	CYP	Neophytos Hadjispyrou (to AEZ Zakakiou)
77	FW	CYP	Savvas Kyprou (to AEZ Zakakiou)
7	DF	CYP	Ioannis Kolonas (to Kourris Erimis)
9	FW	CYP	Giorgos Neophytou (to APEP)

=== Nikos & Sokratis Erimis ===
In: Note: Flags indicate national team as defined under FIFA eligibility rules; some limited exceptions apply. Players may hold more than one non-FIFA nationality.

No.	Pos.	Nation	Player
5	DF	CYP	Periklis Moustakas (from (Australia) Sutherland Sharks)
60	MF	CYP	Antonis Aeroporos (from Apollon Limassol U21)
7	DF	POR	Rúben Freitas (from (Portugal) Salgueiros 08)
6	MF	FRA	Maxime Larroque (from (France) US Colomiers)
17	MF	CYP	Giorgos Constantinides (from AEL Limassol U21)
8	MF	CYP	Andreas Nicolaou (from Lenas Limassol)
29	FW	NGA	Sunny Kingsley (free agent)
91	MF	POL	Pawel Herman (from (Poland) Bzura Chodaków)
11	FW	ENG	Sam Malsom (from (England) Tiverton Town)
95	GK	POL	Marcin Marcinkowski (from (Poland) Legionovia Legionowo)
3	DF	SEN	Βιrahim Sarr (from (France) Sainte Savine Riviere De Corps)
94	DF	BUL	Daniel Τsvetkov (from (Bulgaria) PFC Spartak Pleven)
93	MF	NGA	John Oyekunle (from (England) Boreham Wood)
23	MF	NGA	Emmanuel Adewole (from (Egypt) El Raja Marsa Matruh)
15	FW	CMR	Francis Tsoungui (from (France) FC Girondins de Bordeaux U21)
10	FW	SLE	Moustapha Bangura (free agent)

Out: Note: Flags indicate national team as defined under FIFA eligibility rules; some limited exceptions apply. Players may hold more than one non-FIFA nationality.

No.	Pos.	Nation	Player
14	FW	CYP	Marcos Michael (loan return to Anorthosis Famagusta)
63	FW	CYP	Minas Antoniou (loan return to AEL Limassol)
21	MF	POR	Zé Vítor (to Karmiotissa Polemidion)
29	MF	CYP	Andreas Mammides (to AEZ Zakakiou)
11	FW	CYP	Panayiotis Chailis (to Amathus Agiou Tychona)
6	DF	CYP	Andreas Kounounis (to Amathus Agiou Tychona)
7	MF	CYP	Marinos Evelthontos (to Amathus Agiou Tychona)
5	DF	CYP	Nicos Sofokleous (to Enosis Neon Parekklisia)
56	GK	CYP	Simos Tsiakkas (to Aris Limassol)
9	FW	CYP	Andreas Pittaras (to (Greece) Kallithea)
30	FW	CYP	Giorgos Georgiou (to ENAD Polis Chrysochous)
33	MF	CYP	Giorgos Constanti (to Achyronas Liopetri)
20	MF	NGA	Joshua Izuchukwu (to APEP)
8	FW	CYP	Christos Makris (to Akritas Chloraka)
3	DF	CYP	Stefanos Matsoukas (to Amathus Agiou Tychona)

=== Olympiakos Nicosia ===
In: Note: Flags indicate national team as defined under FIFA eligibility rules; some limited exceptions apply. Players may hold more than one non-FIFA nationality.

No.	Pos.	Nation	Player
7	MF	CYP	Panayiotis Therapontos (on loan from Omonia)
26	MF	CYP	Demetris Christofi (from AEP Paphos)
18	FW	CYP	Demetris Vassiliades (from (United States) Ironbound SC Predators)
15	DF	LTU	Mantvydas Eiza (from Ormidia)
8	MF	CYP	Fanos Katelaris (on loan from Omonia)
16	GK	CYP	Nicolas Anastasiou (on loan from Doxa Katokopias)
17	FW	ALG	Amine Meftah (from (France) Paris Saint-Germain Academy)
99	FW	GRE	Paris Andriopoulos (free agent)

Out: Note: Flags indicate national team as defined under FIFA eligibility rules; some limited exceptions apply. Players may hold more than one non-FIFA nationality.

No.	Pos.	Nation	Player
40	MF	CYP	Markos Charalambous (loan return to APOEL)
1	GK	CYP	Constantinos Panagi (to Omonia)
7	MF	CYP	Pantelis Vasiliou (to Doxa Katokopias)
12	FW	CYP	Kyriacos Vasiliou (to Doxa Katokopias)
10	MF	CYP	Giannis Pachipis (to Karmiotissa Polemidion)
24	DF	CYP	Christakis Constantinou (to Ormidia)
6	MF	CYP	Stavros Zevlaris (to Ormidia)
2	DF	CYP	Evangelos Kyriacou (to Othellos Athienou)
19	MF	COM	Nakibou Aboubakari (released)
27	DF	CYP	Andreas Themistokleous (to (Latvia) FK Jelgava)
13	DF	CYP	Giannis Serafeim (to Ethnikos Assia)

=== Omonia Aradippou ===
In: Note: Flags indicate national team as defined under FIFA eligibility rules; some limited exceptions apply. Players may hold more than one non-FIFA nationality.

No.	Pos.	Nation	Player
22	GK	CYP	Andreas Photiou (from Nea Salamina)
21	MF	CYP	Giorgos Panagi (from Nea Salamina)
2	DF	CYP	Orthodoxos Ioannou (from Othellos Athienou)
10	MF	GRE	Panayiotis Linardos (from Anagennisi Dherynia)
17	FW	CYP	Prodromos Therapontos (from Anagennisi Dherynia)
3	DF	CYP	Zannetos Koumasi (from Enosis Neon Paralimni)
27	MF	GHA	Jerome Agbo (from Nea Salamina)
9	FW	NED	Rangelo Janga (from (Netherlands) Excelsior)
99	GK	ESP	Angel Diez (from (Spain) Real Avilés)

Out: Note: Flags indicate national team as defined under FIFA eligibility rules; some limited exceptions apply. Players may hold more than one non-FIFA nationality.

No.	Pos.	Nation	Player
5	MF	CYP	Kyriakos Stylianou (released)
6	MF	CYP	Marios Georgiou (to ASIL Lysi)
21	DF	ANG	João Comboio (to Elpida Xylofagou)
42	FW	CPV	José Semedo (to (Portugal) 1º de Dezembro)
22	GK	ARG	Ramiro González (to Elpida Xylofagou)
7	FW	CYP	Panayiotis Pontikos (to Elpida Xylofagou)
9	FW	CYP	Demos Demosthenous (to Anagennisi Dherynia)
10	MF	CYP	Chrysafis Chrysafi (to PO Xylotymbou)
55	FW	CYP	Demetris Theofanous (to Karmiotissa Polemidion)
23	GK	CYP	Giorgos Christodoulou (released)

=== Pafos FC ===
In: Note: Flags indicate national team as defined under FIFA eligibility rules; some limited exceptions apply. Players may hold more than one non-FIFA nationality.

No.	Pos.	Nation	Player
77	DF	CYP	Demetris Filippou (from AEP Paphos)
12	MF	CYP	Tasos Makris (from AEK Kouklia)
16	FW	CYP	Polis Filippou (from AEP Paphos)
20	FW	CYP	Onisiforos Pachtalias (from AEK Kouklia)
1	GK	CYP	Demetris Leoni (from Ayia Napa)
30	GK	HUN	Zsolt Sebők (from AEP Paphos)
25	DF	CYP	Panayiotis Ioannou (from AEK Kouklia)
19	MF	CYP	Alexandros Garpozis (from AEK Kouklia)
28	MF	CYP	Ioannis Varnavidis (from AEP Paphos)
—	FW	CYP	Panayiotis Loukaidis (from AEK Kouklia)
17	DF	CYP	Thomas Ioannou (from AEP Paphos)
8	MF	CYP	Giorgos Sielis (from AEK Kouklia)
7	MF	POR	Ivan Forbes (from Ermis Aradippou)
4	DF	CYP	Pantelis Pitsillos (from AEK Kouklia)
10	MF	POR	Hugo Moutinho (from AEK Kouklia)
9	FW	CYP	Stamatis Pantos (from Nea Salamina)
21	MF	POR	Wesllem (from AEK Kouklia)
55	DF	CYP	Ioannis Savva (from AEK Kouklia)
44	MF	CRO	Jurica Grgec (from (Croatia) NK Zelina)
37	FW	CYP	Panayiotis Zachariou (from AEP Paphos)
2	DF	CYP	Stefanos Miller (from AEP Paphos)
84	FW	GHA	Chris Dickson (from (England) Dagenham & Redbridge)
—	DF	CYP	Charalambos Charalambous (from AEK Kouklia)

Out: Note: Flags indicate national team as defined under FIFA eligibility rules; some limited exceptions apply. Players may hold more than one non-FIFA nationality.

No.	Pos.	Nation	Player
—	FW	CYP	Panayiotis Loukaidis (on loan to Akritas Chlorakas)
