= List of Cypriot football transfers winter 2014–15 =

This is a list of Cypriot football transfers for the 2014–15 winter transfer window by club. Only transfers of clubs in the Cypriot First Division and Cypriot Second Division are included.

The winter transfer window opened on 1 January 2015, although a few transfers took place prior to that date. The window closed at midnight on 2 February 2015. Players without a club may join one at any time, either during or in between transfer windows.

== Cypriot First Division ==
=== AEK Larnaca ===
In: Note: Flags indicate national team as defined under FIFA eligibility rules; some limited exceptions apply. Players may hold more than one non-FIFA nationality.

No.	Pos.	Nation	Player
77	FW	POR	Jorge Monteiro (from (Portugal) Moreirense)
5	DF	CYP	Constantinos Mintikkis (from Nea Salamina)
—	DF	BEL	Jordan Atheba (from (Belgium) Standard Liège)

Out: Note: Flags indicate national team as defined under FIFA eligibility rules; some limited exceptions apply. Players may hold more than one non-FIFA nationality.

No.	Pos.	Nation	Player
2	DF	CYP	Eleftherios Mertakas (to Ayia Napa)
4	DF	NED	Serginho Greene (on loan to Othellos Athienou)

=== AEL Limassol ===
In: Note: Flags indicate national team as defined under FIFA eligibility rules; some limited exceptions apply. Players may hold more than one non-FIFA nationality.

No.	Pos.	Nation	Player
6	DF	SEN	Massamba Sambou (from (India) NorthEast United)
25	DF	FRA	Bernard Mendy (from (India) Chennaiyin)
15	MF	SWE	Maic Sema (from (Norway) Haugesund)

Out: Note: Flags indicate national team as defined under FIFA eligibility rules; some limited exceptions apply. Players may hold more than one non-FIFA nationality.

No.	Pos.	Nation	Player
17	FW	BRA	Danielzinho (loan return to (Brazil) São Caetano)
61	GK	POR	Mickaël Meira (to (Portugal) Atlético CP)
99	FW	VEN	Jaime Moreno (loan return to (Venezuela) Deportivo Anzoátegui)
90	MF	GBS	Zézinho (loan return to (Portugal) Sporting Lisbon)
50	DF	POR	Cadú (to (Portugal) Gil Vicente)
10	MF	BRA	Diego Barcelos (to (Thailand) Police United)
9	FW	POL	Łukasz Gikiewicz (to (Bulgaria) Levski Sofia)

=== Anorthosis Famagusta ===
In: Note: Flags indicate national team as defined under FIFA eligibility rules; some limited exceptions apply. Players may hold more than one non-FIFA nationality.

No.	Pos.	Nation	Player
28	MF	CYP	Panayiotis Constantinou (from Aris Limassol)
77	FW	POR	Esmaël Gonçalves (on loan from (Portugal) Rio Ave)

Out: Note: Flags indicate national team as defined under FIFA eligibility rules; some limited exceptions apply. Players may hold more than one non-FIFA nationality.

No.	Pos.	Nation	Player
16	GK	FRA	Mathieu Valverde (on loan to Ethnikos Achna)
9	FW	LAT	Valērijs Šabala (loan return to (Belgium) Club Brugge)

=== APOEL ===
In: Note: Flags indicate national team as defined under FIFA eligibility rules; some limited exceptions apply. Players may hold more than one non-FIFA nationality.

No.	Pos.	Nation	Player
13	MF	GER	Martin Lanig (from (Germany) Eintracht Frankfurt)
34	FW	MKD	Valmir Nafiu (from (Germany) Hamburger SV)
—	FW	CYP	Michalis Charalambous (from Ethnikos Achna)

Out: Note: Flags indicate national team as defined under FIFA eligibility rules; some limited exceptions apply. Players may hold more than one non-FIFA nationality.

No.	Pos.	Nation	Player
23	DF	GRE	Anastasios Papazoglou (to (Greece) Skoda Xanthi)

=== Apollon Limassol ===
In: Note: Flags indicate national team as defined under FIFA eligibility rules; some limited exceptions apply. Players may hold more than one non-FIFA nationality.

No.	Pos.	Nation	Player
18	MF	BRA	Elton Figueiredo (from (Romania) Dinamo București)
3	DF	POR	Nuno Lopes (from (Portugal) Rio Ave)
—	FW	BRA	Rômulo dos Santos (loan return from Ayia Napa)
29	DF	RWA	Edwin Ouon (from Ermis Aradippou)
21	FW	CYP	Georgios Kolokoudias (from Ayia Napa)

Out: Note: Flags indicate national team as defined under FIFA eligibility rules; some limited exceptions apply. Players may hold more than one non-FIFA nationality.

No.	Pos.	Nation	Player
39	DF	GRE	Christos Intzidis (to (Greece) Olympiacos Volos)
8	MF	ROU	Nicolae Grigore (to (Romania) Dinamo București)
77	FW	CMR	Fabrice Olinga (to (Romania) FC Viitorul)
2	DF	NED	Dustley Mulder (released)
—	FW	BRA	Rômulo dos Santos (to (Portugal) Vitória Guimarães)
11	FW	CZE	Jan Rezek (to Ermis Aradippou)

=== Ayia Napa ===
In: Note: Flags indicate national team as defined under FIFA eligibility rules; some limited exceptions apply. Players may hold more than one non-FIFA nationality.

No.	Pos.	Nation	Player
43	FW	ZIM	Musa Mguni (free agent)
77	MF	CRO	Ivan Ćurjurić (from (Greece) Lamia)
37	DF	CYP	Eleftherios Mertakas (from AEK Larnaca)
55	FW	CRO	Ivan Antolek (free agent)

Out: Note: Flags indicate national team as defined under FIFA eligibility rules; some limited exceptions apply. Players may hold more than one non-FIFA nationality.

No.	Pos.	Nation	Player
7	FW	BRA	Marcos dos Santos (to (Greece) Panegialios)
14	MF	ARG	Fabricio Poci (to (Greece) Panargiakos)
8	MF	CYP	Georgios Aresti (to Doxa Katokopias)
12	FW	BRA	Rômulo dos Santos (loan return to Apollon Limassol)
6	DF	GRE	Stergios Psianos (to (Greece) Apollon Smyrnis)
4	DF	GRE	Stavros Stathakis (to (Greece) AEL)
9	FW	CYP	Georgios Kolokoudias (to Apollon Limassol)

=== Doxa Katokopias ===
In: Note: Flags indicate national team as defined under FIFA eligibility rules; some limited exceptions apply. Players may hold more than one non-FIFA nationality.

No.	Pos.	Nation	Player
18	FW	POR	Bernardo Vasconcelos (from (Poland) Zawisza Bydgoszcz)
88	MF	CYP	Georgios Aresti (from Ayia Napa)
84	FW	BRA	Ricardo Lobo (from (Japan) Ehime)

Out: Note: Flags indicate national team as defined under FIFA eligibility rules; some limited exceptions apply. Players may hold more than one non-FIFA nationality.

No.	Pos.	Nation	Player
7	MF	ESP	José Higón (released)
14	MF	POR	Paulo Alves (on loan to (Angola) Kabuscorp)
6	DF	GRE	Stefanos Siontis (to (Greece) Kerkyra)
11	FW	HAI	Gary Ambroise (released)
30	MF	GHA	Livingstone Adjin (released)

=== Ermis Aradippou ===
In: Note: Flags indicate national team as defined under FIFA eligibility rules; some limited exceptions apply. Players may hold more than one non-FIFA nationality.

No.	Pos.	Nation	Player
91	MF	BRA	Bruno Turco (from (Uruguay) Deportivo Maldonado)
12	FW	PAR	Aldo Adorno (from (Ukraine) Metalurg Donetsk)
35	DF	POR	Toni Lopes (free agent)
81	MF	POR	Manú (from (Portugal) Vitória Setúbal)
21	FW	CZE	Jan Rezek (from Apollon Limassol)

Out: Note: Flags indicate national team as defined under FIFA eligibility rules; some limited exceptions apply. Players may hold more than one non-FIFA nationality.

No.	Pos.	Nation	Player
80	FW	BRA	Jonatas Belusso (to (Brazil) Botafogo Futebol Clube)
83	MF	ESP	Rubén Palazuelos (to (Spain) Sestao River Club)
8	MF	CYP	Stelios Demetriou (to (Sweden) Akropolis IF)
77	MF	BRA	Douglas Packer (to (Brazil) Clube de Regatas Brasil)
33	MF	BRA	Marcos De Azevedo (released)
12	FW	PAR	Aldo Adorno (released)
6	DF	RWA	Edwin Ouon (to Apollon Limassol)

=== Ethnikos Achna ===
In: Note: Flags indicate national team as defined under FIFA eligibility rules; some limited exceptions apply. Players may hold more than one non-FIFA nationality.

No.	Pos.	Nation	Player
18	DF	GRE	Anestis Argyriou (from (Poland) Zawisza Bydgoszcz)
22	MF	ESP	Joaquín García (from (Spain) UE Cornellà)
64	GK	FRA	Mathieu Valverde (on loan from Anorthosis Famagusta)
16	FW	HAI	Kervens Belfort (from (France) Fréjus Saint-Raphaël)

Out: Note: Flags indicate national team as defined under FIFA eligibility rules; some limited exceptions apply. Players may hold more than one non-FIFA nationality.

No.	Pos.	Nation	Player
23	DF	AUT	Andreas Dober (to (Austria) SKN St. Pölten)
17	MF	GRE	Panagiotis Giannopoulos (to (Greece) Pierikos)
42	MF	ALB	Krasniqi Kreshnic (on loan to THOI Lakatamia)
15	FW	GHA	Jamie Moore (to (Greece) Alimos)
77	MF	CIV	Rodolph Amessan (to (Portugal) União da Madeira)
99	FW	BRA	Jone (to (Greece) AEL)
16	DF	CYP	Elpidoforos Elia (retired)
1	GK	SEN	Bouna Coundoul (released)
14	FW	CYP	Michalis Charalambous (to APOEL)

=== Nea Salamina ===
In: Note: Flags indicate national team as defined under FIFA eligibility rules; some limited exceptions apply. Players may hold more than one non-FIFA nationality.

No.	Pos.	Nation	Player
30	MF	GEO	Shota Grigalashvili (from Omonia)
8	FW	CYP	Achilleas Vasiliou (loan return from Anagennisi Dherynia)
55	MF	GEO	Giorgi Papava (from (Georgia (country)) Dinamo Tbilisi)
94	FW	HAI	Jean-Eudes Maurice (from (India) Chennaiyin)

Out: Note: Flags indicate national team as defined under FIFA eligibility rules; some limited exceptions apply. Players may hold more than one non-FIFA nationality.

No.	Pos.	Nation	Player
33	MF	POR	Gabi (to (Portugal) Académico Viseu)
22	MF	SRB	Miloš Krstić (released)
15	FW	NGR	Chidi Onyemah (to (Portugal) Famalicão)
6	MF	CIV	Siaka Bamba (to (Portugal) Chaves)
77	DF	CYP	Constantinos Mintikkis (to AEK Larnaca)

=== Omonia ===
In: Note: Flags indicate national team as defined under FIFA eligibility rules; some limited exceptions apply. Players may hold more than one non-FIFA nationality.

No.	Pos.	Nation	Player
27	FW	MLT	André Schembri (from (Germany) FSV Frankfurt)
90	DF	CRO	Ivan Runje (on loan from (Denmark) FC Nordsjælland)
93	MF	FRA	Hérold Goulon (from (Poland) Zawisza Bydgoszcz)

Out: Note: Flags indicate national team as defined under FIFA eligibility rules; some limited exceptions apply. Players may hold more than one non-FIFA nationality.

No.	Pos.	Nation	Player
10	MF	GEO	Shota Grigalashvili (to Nea Salamina)
88	MF	BRA	Serginho (released)
5	DF	SRB	Milan Stepanov (released)
89	DF	GER	Jonas Acquistapace (to (Germany) SV Wehen)
17	DF	FRA	Anthony Scaramozzino (on loan to (Greece) Panetolikos)

=== Othellos Athienou ===
In: Note: Flags indicate national team as defined under FIFA eligibility rules; some limited exceptions apply. Players may hold more than one non-FIFA nationality.

No.	Pos.	Nation	Player
39	MF	ESP	Jonan García (free agent)
2	DF	NED	Serginho Greene (on loan from AEK Larnaca)
83	DF	NED	Civard Sprockel (free agent)

Out: Note: Flags indicate national team as defined under FIFA eligibility rules; some limited exceptions apply. Players may hold more than one non-FIFA nationality.

No.	Pos.	Nation	Player
20	MF	ROU	Marian Neagu (loan return to (Romania) Concordia Chiajna)
16	DF	ESP	Dennis Nieblas (to (Jordan) Shabab Al-Ordon Club)
11	DF	CYP	Fotis Kezos (released)
1	GK	CYP	Charalambos Demetriou (to Ethnikos Latsion)
10	MF	TUN	Mohamed Sassi (to Anagennisi Dherynia)

== Cypriot Second Division ==
=== AEZ Zakakiou ===
In: Note: Flags indicate national team as defined under FIFA eligibility rules; some limited exceptions apply. Players may hold more than one non-FIFA nationality.

No.	Pos.	Nation	Player
13	FW	GRE	Minas Chalkiadakis (from (Greece) Panathinaikos U21)

Out: Note: Flags indicate national team as defined under FIFA eligibility rules; some limited exceptions apply. Players may hold more than one non-FIFA nationality.

No.	Pos.	Nation	Player
—	MF	COL	Jhonatan Rojas (released)
55	FW	SLE	Ishmael Danjaji (released)
9	FW	GRE	Taxiarchis Thanelas (released)
7	MF	BUL	Simeon Ganchev (to Enosis Neon Parekklisia)

=== Anagennisi Dherynia ===
In: Note: Flags indicate national team as defined under FIFA eligibility rules; some limited exceptions apply. Players may hold more than one non-FIFA nationality.

No.	Pos.	Nation	Player
27	MF	TUN	Mohamed Sassi (from Othellos Athienou)
70	FW	CYP	Prodromos Therapontos (from Omonia Aradippou)
37	FW	FRA	Kevin Zolana (from (France) Tours FC U21)

Out: Note: Flags indicate national team as defined under FIFA eligibility rules; some limited exceptions apply. Players may hold more than one non-FIFA nationality.

No.	Pos.	Nation	Player
9	FW	CYP	Demos Demosthenous (to Ormidia)
77	FW	POR	Bruno Luz (released)
80	MF	GRE	Christos Chatzipantelides (released)
8	FW	CYP	Achilleas Vasiliou (loan return to Nea Salamina)
7	FW	NED	Dion Esajas (released)
21	MF	CYP	Panayiotis Mavroudis (to Elpida Xylofagou)

=== APEP Pitsilia ===
In: Note: Flags indicate national team as defined under FIFA eligibility rules; some limited exceptions apply. Players may hold more than one non-FIFA nationality.

No.	Pos.	Nation	Player
99	FW	CYP	Stefanos Paschali (from AEL Limassol U21)

Out: Note: Flags indicate national team as defined under FIFA eligibility rules; some limited exceptions apply. Players may hold more than one non-FIFA nationality.

No.	Pos.	Nation	Player
69	MF	RWA	Lewis Aniweta (to Pafos FC)
15	DF	CYP	Sotiris Finiris (to Nikos & Sokratis Erimis)
21	DF	CYP	Panayiotis Foklas (to Nikos & Sokratis Erimis)
17	FW	GRE	Ioannis Ntiniotakis (to (Greece) Ionikos)

=== Aris Limassol ===
In: Note: Flags indicate national team as defined under FIFA eligibility rules; some limited exceptions apply. Players may hold more than one non-FIFA nationality.

No.	Pos.	Nation	Player
38	FW	CYP	Theodosis Kyprou (from (Greece) AEL Kalloni)
19	FW	ESP	Carlitos (from (Spain) Novelda CF)

Out: Note: Flags indicate national team as defined under FIFA eligibility rules; some limited exceptions apply. Players may hold more than one non-FIFA nationality.

No.	Pos.	Nation	Player
10	MF	ROU	Maximilian Nicu (to (Germany) SV Elversberg)
33	GK	SLO	Gregor Fink (released)
11	MF	CYP	Panayiotis Constantinou (to Anorthosis Famagusta)
90	FW	CYP	Charalambos Demosthenous (to Pafos FC)
18	MF	CPV	Bruno Spencer (released)
23	FW	CRO	Hrvoje Tokić (to (Croatia) NK Dugopolje)

=== Digenis Voroklinis ===
In: Note: Flags indicate national team as defined under FIFA eligibility rules; some limited exceptions apply. Players may hold more than one non-FIFA nationality.

No.	Pos.	Nation	Player
36	DF	CYP	Loizos Papasavvas (from Omonia Aradippou)
33	FW	GRE	Giorgos Grammatikopoulos (from Chalkanoras Idaliou)

Out: Note: Flags indicate national team as defined under FIFA eligibility rules; some limited exceptions apply. Players may hold more than one non-FIFA nationality.

No.	Pos.	Nation	Player
10	FW	CYP	Costas Constantinou (to Ethnikos Assia)
26	MF	MDA	Roman Bolbocian (to (Greece) Fokikos)
24	FW	ALG	Hicham Ait Ben Abdellah (released)

=== Elpida Xylofagou ===
In: Note: Flags indicate national team as defined under FIFA eligibility rules; some limited exceptions apply. Players may hold more than one non-FIFA nationality.

No.	Pos.	Nation	Player
27	FW	ENG	Lewis Nuttall (from (England) Glyndŵr Wrexham Football Academy)
20	MF	CYP	Panayiotis Mavroudis (from Anagennisi Dherynia)

Out: Note: Flags indicate national team as defined under FIFA eligibility rules; some limited exceptions apply. Players may hold more than one non-FIFA nationality.

No.	Pos.	Nation	Player
11	FW	CYP	Christoforos Christofi (to Achyronas Liopetriou)
8	FW	CYP	Christos Pierettis (released)
17	FW	CYP	Anastasis Parou (to Achyronas Liopetriou)

=== ENAD Polis Chrysochous ===
In: Note: Flags indicate national team as defined under FIFA eligibility rules; some limited exceptions apply. Players may hold more than one non-FIFA nationality.

No.	Pos.	Nation	Player
99	FW	ISR	Omri Ron (from (Israel) Hapoel Katamon)
40	MF	CYP	Anthimos Georgiou (from Foinikas Agias Marinas Chrysochous)

Out: Note: Flags indicate national team as defined under FIFA eligibility rules; some limited exceptions apply. Players may hold more than one non-FIFA nationality.

No.	Pos.	Nation	Player
4	MF	CYP	Giannis Retsas (to Akritas Chlorakas)
20	MF	LAT	Andrejs Perepļotkins (released)
17	FW	BUL	Vladislav Mirchev (released)

=== Enosis Neon Paralimni ===
In: Note: Flags indicate national team as defined under FIFA eligibility rules; some limited exceptions apply. Players may hold more than one non-FIFA nationality.

No.	Pos.	Nation	Player
94	MF	BEL	Kenneth Van Ransbeeck (from (Belgium) Woluwe-Zaventem)
33	FW	CRO	Mario Budimir (free agent)

Out: Note: Flags indicate national team as defined under FIFA eligibility rules; some limited exceptions apply. Players may hold more than one non-FIFA nationality.

No.	Pos.	Nation	Player
77	DF	CYP	Athos Solomou (to (Romania) Oțelul Galați)

=== Enosis Neon Parekklisia ===
In: Note: Flags indicate national team as defined under FIFA eligibility rules; some limited exceptions apply. Players may hold more than one non-FIFA nationality.

No.	Pos.	Nation	Player
3	MF	BUL	Simeon Ganchev (from AEZ Zakakiou)

Out: Note: Flags indicate national team as defined under FIFA eligibility rules; some limited exceptions apply. Players may hold more than one non-FIFA nationality.

No.	Pos.	Nation	Player
5	DF	CYP	Nicos Sofokleous (released)
11	MF	CYP	Adamos Efstathiou (released)
20	MF	ALG	Nasser Menassel (released)

=== Karmiotissa Polemidion ===
In: Note: Flags indicate national team as defined under FIFA eligibility rules; some limited exceptions apply. Players may hold more than one non-FIFA nationality.

No.	Pos.	Nation	Player
24	MF	ROU	Marian Neagu (on loan from (Romania) Concordia Chiajna)

Out: Note: Flags indicate national team as defined under FIFA eligibility rules; some limited exceptions apply. Players may hold more than one non-FIFA nationality.

No.	Pos.	Nation	Player
21	MF	GER	Christopher Griebsch (released)

=== Nikos & Sokratis Erimis ===
In: Note: Flags indicate national team as defined under FIFA eligibility rules; some limited exceptions apply. Players may hold more than one non-FIFA nationality.

No.	Pos.	Nation	Player
9	FW	ENG	Jordan Palmer-Samuels (from (England) Hayes & Yeading)
26	FW	NGR	Leonard Chisom Johnson (free agent)
99	DF	FRA	Alexis Aubou (from (France) Paris F.C.)
50	DF	CYP	Sotiris Finiris (from APEP)
55	DF	CYP	Panayiotis Foklas (from APEP)
37	FW	NED	Alain Baank (from (Netherlands) VV De Zouaven)
36	GK	CZE	Matej Stencek (free agent)

Out: Note: Flags indicate national team as defined under FIFA eligibility rules; some limited exceptions apply. Players may hold more than one non-FIFA nationality.

No.	Pos.	Nation	Player
3	DF	SEN	Birahim Sarr (released)
6	MF	FRA	Maxime Larroque (released)
23	MF	NGR	Emmanuel Adewole (released)
15	FW	CMR	Francis Tsoungui (released)
10	FW	SLE	Moustapha Bangura (released)

=== Olympiakos Nicosia ===
In: Note: Flags indicate national team as defined under FIFA eligibility rules; some limited exceptions apply. Players may hold more than one non-FIFA nationality.

No.	Pos.	Nation	Player
25	GK	SVK	Milan Vincler (from (Slovakia) Tatran Prešov)

Out: Note: Flags indicate national team as defined under FIFA eligibility rules; some limited exceptions apply. Players may hold more than one non-FIFA nationality.

No.	Pos.	Nation	Player
20	MF	CYP	Marios Nikou (to Enosi Kokkinotrimithias)
15	DF	LTU	Mantvydas Eiza (released)

=== Omonia Aradippou ===
In: Note: Flags indicate national team as defined under FIFA eligibility rules; some limited exceptions apply. Players may hold more than one non-FIFA nationality.

No.	Pos.	Nation	Player
77	MF	CYP	Marios Laifis (free agent)
58	FW	ESP	Adolfo Ortiz (from (Malta) Victoria Wanderers)
56	FW	ESP	Chabi (from (Slovakia) Slovan Bratislava)

Out: Note: Flags indicate national team as defined under FIFA eligibility rules; some limited exceptions apply. Players may hold more than one non-FIFA nationality.

No.	Pos.	Nation	Player
3	DF	CYP	Zannetos Koumasi (released)
6	DF	CYP	Loizos Papasavvas (to Digenis Oroklinis)
11	FW	CYP	Andreas Constantinou (to PAEEK FC)
21	MF	CYP	Giorgos Panagi (released)
17	FW	CYP	Prodromos Therapontos (to Anagennisi Dherynia)
27	MF	GHA	Jerome Agbo (released)

=== Pafos FC ===
In: Note: Flags indicate national team as defined under FIFA eligibility rules; some limited exceptions apply. Players may hold more than one non-FIFA nationality.

No.	Pos.	Nation	Player
11	MF	RWA	Lewis Aniweta (from APEP)
5	FW	CYP	Charalambos Demosthenous (from Aris Limassol)

Out: Note: Flags indicate national team as defined under FIFA eligibility rules; some limited exceptions apply. Players may hold more than one non-FIFA nationality.

No.	Pos.	Nation	Player
20	FW	CYP	Onisiforos Pachtalias (to Akritas Chlorakas)
28	MF	CYP	Ioannis Varnavidis (to Akritas Chlorakas)
