= List of Cypriot football transfers winter 2015–16 =

This is a list of Cypriot football transfers for the 2015–16 winter transfer window by club. Only transfers of clubs in the Cypriot First Division and Cypriot Second Division are included.

The winter transfer window opened on 1 January 2016, although a few transfers took place prior to that date. The window closed at midnight on 1 February 2016. Players without a club may join one at any time, either during or in between transfer windows.

== Cypriot First Division ==
=== AEK Larnaca ===
In: Note: Flags indicate national team as defined under FIFA eligibility rules; some limited exceptions apply. Players may hold more than one non-FIFA nationality.

No.	Pos.	Nation	Player
70	MF	BRA	Farley Rosa (on loan from (Brazil) Monte Azul)
50	DF	MKD	Daniel Mojsov (from (Turkey) Adana Demirspor)
12	FW	MKD	Ivan Tričkovski (on loan from (Poland) Legia Warsaw)

Out: Note: Flags indicate national team as defined under FIFA eligibility rules; some limited exceptions apply. Players may hold more than one non-FIFA nationality.

No.	Pos.	Nation	Player
29	FW	ESP	José Kanté (to (Poland) Górnik Zabrze)
77	FW	POR	Jorge Monteiro (to (Greece) Iraklis)

=== AEL Limassol ===
In: Note: Flags indicate national team as defined under FIFA eligibility rules; some limited exceptions apply. Players may hold more than one non-FIFA nationality.

No.	Pos.	Nation	Player
11	FW	NGA	Marco Tagbajumi (loan return from (Norway) Strømsgodset IF)
29	FW	POL	Arkadiusz Piech (on loan from (Poland) Legia Warsaw)
33	MF	MKD	Ostoja Stjepanović (from (Serbia) OFK Beograd)
79	MF	CRO	Adnan Aganović (from (Romania) Viitorul Constanța)
22	FW	ROU	Mihai Dina (from (Romania) Concordia Chiajna)

Out: Note: Flags indicate national team as defined under FIFA eligibility rules; some limited exceptions apply. Players may hold more than one non-FIFA nationality.

No.	Pos.	Nation	Player
15	DF	GRE	Vasilios Karagounis (loan return to (Greece) Olympiacos)
20	FW	SEN	Mame Niang (loan return to (South Africa) Mamelodi Sundowns)
6	MF	GHA	John Arwuah (to (South Africa) University of Pretoria)
9	FW	SWE	Maic Sema (to (Sweden) Örebro SK)
2	DF	VEN	Jonathan España (to Atlético Venezuela)
11	FW	NGA	Marco Tagbajumi (to (Thailand) Nakhon Ratchasima)
23	DF	SEN	Massamba Sambou (to (Bangladesh) Sheikh Russel)

=== Anorthosis Famagusta ===
In: Note: Flags indicate national team as defined under FIFA eligibility rules; some limited exceptions apply. Players may hold more than one non-FIFA nationality.

No.	Pos.	Nation	Player
77	FW	GNB	Esmaël Gonçalves (from (Saudi Arabia) Ettifaq FC)
31	GK	CYP	Andreas Kittos (from Ayia Napa)
91	FW	FRA	Jérémy Manzorro (on loan from (Bulgaria) Slavia Sofia)

Out: Note: Flags indicate national team as defined under FIFA eligibility rules; some limited exceptions apply. Players may hold more than one non-FIFA nationality.

No.	Pos.	Nation	Player
1	GK	ARG	Mario Vega (to (United States) Miami FC)
8	MF	GEO	Giorgi Aburjania (to (Spain) Tarragona)

=== APOEL ===
In: Note: Flags indicate national team as defined under FIFA eligibility rules; some limited exceptions apply. Players may hold more than one non-FIFA nationality.

No.	Pos.	Nation	Player
9	FW	STP	Luís Leal (loan return from (Portugal) Belenenses)
21	DF	BUL	Zhivko Milanov (from (Bulgaria) Levski Sofia)
70	MF	GRE	Giannis Gianniotas (on loan from (Greece) Olympiacos)
30	DF	CYP	Giorgos Merkis (from Apollon Limassol)
55	MF	POR	Estrela (from (United States) Orlando City)

Out: Note: Flags indicate national team as defined under FIFA eligibility rules; some limited exceptions apply. Players may hold more than one non-FIFA nationality.

No.	Pos.	Nation	Player
34	FW	MKD	Valmir Nafiu (to (Albania) Skënderbeu Korçë)
90	DF	BRA	Guilherme Choco (to (Brazil) Sampaio Corrêa)
1	GK	ESP	Jordi Codina (on loan to Pafos FC)
13	MF	CYP	Constantinos Makrides (to Apollon Limassol)
9	FW	STP	Luís Leal (to (Paraguay) Cerro Porteño)

=== Apollon Limassol ===
In: Note: Flags indicate national team as defined under FIFA eligibility rules; some limited exceptions apply. Players may hold more than one non-FIFA nationality.

No.	Pos.	Nation	Player
99	FW	CRO	Anton Maglica (from (Croatia) Hajduk Split)
20	MF	CYP	Constantinos Makrides (from APOEL)
33	DF	POR	Pedro Monteiro (on loan from (Portugal) Braga B)

Out: Note: Flags indicate national team as defined under FIFA eligibility rules; some limited exceptions apply. Players may hold more than one non-FIFA nationality.

No.	Pos.	Nation	Player
8	MF	BRA	Farley Rosa (loan return to (Brazil) Monte Azul)
6	MF	ESP	Marcos Gullón (to (Netherlands) Roda JC)
16	DF	CYP	Giorgos Merkis (to APOEL)

=== Aris Limassol ===
In: Note: Flags indicate national team as defined under FIFA eligibility rules; some limited exceptions apply. Players may hold more than one non-FIFA nationality.

No.	Pos.	Nation	Player
25	MF	ROU	Cornel Predescu (free agent)
93	FW	GRE	Antonis Ranos (on loan from (Greece) Skoda Xanthi)
27	MF	SVN	Ivica Guberac (from (Slovenia) Koper)

Out: Note: Flags indicate national team as defined under FIFA eligibility rules; some limited exceptions apply. Players may hold more than one non-FIFA nationality.

No.	Pos.	Nation	Player
6	MF	POL	Roger Guerreiro (to (Brazil) Villa Nova AC)
23	DF	RSA	Roger Da Costa (released)
33	GK	SVK	Marián Kello (to (Slovakia) Košice)
88	MF	ESP	Jose Pedrosa Galan (to (Romania) Ceahlăul Piatra Neamț)
10	FW	SLE	Moustapha Bangura (to (Serbia) Borac Čačak)

=== Ayia Napa ===
In: Note: Flags indicate national team as defined under FIFA eligibility rules; some limited exceptions apply. Players may hold more than one non-FIFA nationality.

No.	Pos.	Nation	Player
92	DF	RUS	Elvis Kryukov (from Enosis Neon Parekklisia)
99	FW	CYP	Kristis Andreou (from (Lithuania) Žalgiris Vilnius)

Out: Note: Flags indicate national team as defined under FIFA eligibility rules; some limited exceptions apply. Players may hold more than one non-FIFA nationality.

No.	Pos.	Nation	Player
9	FW	SRB	Uroš Stojanov (to (Thailand) Prachuap)
11	MF	NGA	Femi Joseph (released)
16	DF	MKD	Bojan Markovski (to (North Macedonia) Rabotnichki)
91	FW	NED	Darren Maatsen (to (Netherlands) Go Ahead Eagles)
27	FW	BRA	Ibson de Melo (to Pafos FC)
8	FW	ZIM	Musa Mguni (to Olympiakos Nicosia)
10	MF	SVN	Anej Lovrečič (released)
1	GK	CYP	Andreas Kittos (to Anorthosis Famagusta)
18	DF	ARG	Emiliano Fusco (to Nea Salamina)

=== Doxa Katokopias ===
In: Note: Flags indicate national team as defined under FIFA eligibility rules; some limited exceptions apply. Players may hold more than one non-FIFA nationality.

No.	Pos.	Nation	Player
5	DF	POR	Abel Pereira (from (Portugal) Varzim)
20	MF	ESP	Diego León (from (Greece) Olympiacos Volos)
89	FW	ANG	Aguinaldo (from (Angola) Interclube)
36	DF	GRE	Dimitris Myrthianos (from (Greece) Panathinaikos U21)

Out: Note: Flags indicate national team as defined under FIFA eligibility rules; some limited exceptions apply. Players may hold more than one non-FIFA nationality.

No.	Pos.	Nation	Player
10	MF	POR	Ricardo Fernandes (retired)
14	MF	ESP	Aritz López Garai (to (Spain) CF Reus Deportiu)
17	DF	CYP	Adamos Efstathiou (released)
23	DF	CYP	Athos Solomou (to (Iran) Rah Ahan)

=== Enosis Neon Paralimni ===
In: Note: Flags indicate national team as defined under FIFA eligibility rules; some limited exceptions apply. Players may hold more than one non-FIFA nationality.

No.	Pos.	Nation	Player
32	GK	CRO	Krševan Santini (from (Ukraine) Zorya Luhansk)
24	MF	MLI	Sadio Tounkara (from (Azerbaijan) Khazar Lankaran)
31	MF	SRB	Stefan Bukorac (from (Serbia) Metalac Gornji Milanovac)
90	MF	ALB	Gezim Shalaj (from (Romania) Dinamo București)

Out: Note: Flags indicate national team as defined under FIFA eligibility rules; some limited exceptions apply. Players may hold more than one non-FIFA nationality.

No.	Pos.	Nation	Player
2	DF	GRE	Grigoris Papazaharias (released)
20	DF	EGY	Amir Megahed (released)
84	FW	GHA	Chris Dickson (to Ermis Aradippou)
9	MF	SRB	Miloš Antić (to Anagennisi Dherynia)
19	GK	GRE	Georgios Ambaris (released)

=== Ermis Aradippou ===
In: Note: Flags indicate national team as defined under FIFA eligibility rules; some limited exceptions apply. Players may hold more than one non-FIFA nationality.

No.	Pos.	Nation	Player
35	MF	POR	Diogo Rosado (free agent)
42	FW	GHA	Chris Dickson (from Enosis Neon Paralimni)
16	DF	ROU	Cristian Sîrghi (from (Romania) Concordia Chiajna)

Out: Note: Flags indicate national team as defined under FIFA eligibility rules; some limited exceptions apply. Players may hold more than one non-FIFA nationality.

No.	Pos.	Nation	Player
9	DF	NED	Cendrino Misidjan (released)
90	FW	BFA	Issouf Ouattara (released)
91	MF	RSA	Sérgio Marakis (released)
30	FW	CYP	Theodoros Papanicolaou (on loan to Digenis Voroklinis)
7	MF	POR	Rúben Brígido (to Othellos Athienou)
29	FW	NGA	Femi Balogun (to (Portugal) Farense)

=== Ethnikos Achna ===
In: Note: Flags indicate national team as defined under FIFA eligibility rules; some limited exceptions apply. Players may hold more than one non-FIFA nationality.

No.	Pos.	Nation	Player
17	MF	GEO	Elguja Grigalashvili (from Pafos FC)
77	FW	GEO	Revaz Barabadze (from (Georgia (country)) FC Liakhvi Tskhinvali)
31	FW	BRA	Guilherme de Paula (from (Malaysia) Selangor FA)

Out: Note: Flags indicate national team as defined under FIFA eligibility rules; some limited exceptions apply. Players may hold more than one non-FIFA nationality.

No.	Pos.	Nation	Player
9	FW	COL	Jhon Obregón (to (Colombia) Boyacá Chicó)
12	MF	ROU	Alexandru Coman (to (Romania) Brașov)
88	FW	GEO	Beka Tugushi (to (Georgia (country)) Torpedo Kutaisi)
11	MF	ROU	Sebastian Cojocnean (released)

=== Nea Salamina ===
In: Note: Flags indicate national team as defined under FIFA eligibility rules; some limited exceptions apply. Players may hold more than one non-FIFA nationality.

No.	Pos.	Nation	Player
22	MF	POR	Tiago Gomes (free agent)
25	FW	BRA	Liliu (from (Malta) Birkirkara)
15	DF	ARG	Emiliano Fusco (from Ayia Napa)

Out: Note: Flags indicate national team as defined under FIFA eligibility rules; some limited exceptions apply. Players may hold more than one non-FIFA nationality.

No.	Pos.	Nation	Player
18	MF	BUL	Veselin Marchev (to (Bulgaria) Lokomotiv Plovdiv)
95	MF	FRA	Arnaud Honoré (to Alki Oroklini)
19	FW	CYP	Marcos Michael (to (Romania) Petrolul Ploiești)

=== Omonia ===
In: Note: Flags indicate national team as defined under FIFA eligibility rules; some limited exceptions apply. Players may hold more than one non-FIFA nationality.

No.	Pos.	Nation	Player
4	DF	CPV	Carlitos (from (Greece) Iraklis)
88	MF	BEL	Faysel Kasmi (on loan from (Belgium) Lierse)
48	DF	CRO	Marin Oršulić (from (Norway) Tromsø IL)
40	MF	ROU	George Florescu (from (Azerbaijan) Gabala)

Out: Note: Flags indicate national team as defined under FIFA eligibility rules; some limited exceptions apply. Players may hold more than one non-FIFA nationality.

No.	Pos.	Nation	Player
3	DF	GEO	Ucha Lobjanidze (to (Georgia (country)) Dinamo Tbilisi)
6	DF	URU	Matías Pérez (to (Uruguay) Rentistas)
76	DF	SEN	Jackson Mendy (to (Greece) Levadiakos)
93	MF	FRA	Herold Goulon (to (Romania) Viitorul Constanța)

=== Pafos FC ===
In: Note: Flags indicate national team as defined under FIFA eligibility rules; some limited exceptions apply. Players may hold more than one non-FIFA nationality.

No.	Pos.	Nation	Player
11	FW	ARG	Miguel Alba (from (Argentina) Guaraní Antonio Franco)
95	FW	BRA	Ibson de Melo (from Ayia Napa)
46	GK	ESP	Jordi Codina (on loan from APOEL)
14	DF	CMR	Éric Matoukou (from (Finland) Inter Turku)

Out: Note: Flags indicate national team as defined under FIFA eligibility rules; some limited exceptions apply. Players may hold more than one non-FIFA nationality.

No.	Pos.	Nation	Player
30	MF	GEO	Elguja Grigalashvili (to Ethnikos Achna)
89	GK	GEO	Roin Kvaskhvadze (to (Georgia (country)) Torpedo Kutaisi)
5	DF	GEO	Gia Grigalava (released)
9	FW	GEO	Nikoloz Gelashvili (to (Georgia (country)) Dinamo Tbilisi)
8	MF	CYP	Giorgos Sielis (released)

== Cypriot Second Division ==
=== AEZ Zakakiou ===
In: Note: Flags indicate national team as defined under FIFA eligibility rules; some limited exceptions apply. Players may hold more than one non-FIFA nationality.

No.	Pos.	Nation	Player
87	FW	CYP	Savvas Pikramenos (from ENAD Polis Chrysochous)
21	MF	CYP	Emilios Panayiotou (free agent)

Out: Note: Flags indicate national team as defined under FIFA eligibility rules; some limited exceptions apply. Players may hold more than one non-FIFA nationality.

No.	Pos.	Nation	Player
23	MF	CYP	Charis Andreou (to Foinikas Agias Marinas Chrysochous)
18	MF	CYP	Elias Christodoulou (released)

=== Anagennisi Dherynia ===
In: Note: Flags indicate national team as defined under FIFA eligibility rules; some limited exceptions apply. Players may hold more than one non-FIFA nationality.

No.	Pos.	Nation	Player
94	MF	SRB	Miloš Antić (from Enosis Neon Paralimni)
6	MF	CMR	Louis Malandjou (free agent)

Out: Note: Flags indicate national team as defined under FIFA eligibility rules; some limited exceptions apply. Players may hold more than one non-FIFA nationality.

No.	Pos.	Nation	Player

=== ASIL ===
In: Note: Flags indicate national team as defined under FIFA eligibility rules; some limited exceptions apply. Players may hold more than one non-FIFA nationality.

No.	Pos.	Nation	Player
30	DF	ROU	Gabriel Frîncu (from Othellos Athienou)
32	MF	ROU	Alexandru Ciocalteu (from (Lebanon) Racing Beirut)

Out: Note: Flags indicate national team as defined under FIFA eligibility rules; some limited exceptions apply. Players may hold more than one non-FIFA nationality.

No.	Pos.	Nation	Player
11	FW	CYP	Kyriacos Christou (to Achyronas Liopetri)
77	FW	GNB	Adul Seidi (released)
22	MF	CYP	Stavros Christoudias (released)
2	DF	ARG	Daniel Blanco (released)

=== Digenis Voroklinis ===
In: Note: Flags indicate national team as defined under FIFA eligibility rules; some limited exceptions apply. Players may hold more than one non-FIFA nationality.

No.	Pos.	Nation	Player
54	FW	CYP	Kyriakos Chatziaros (from Ethnikos Latsion)
79	FW	CYP	Theodoros Papanicolaou (on loan from Ermis Aradippou)

Out: Note: Flags indicate national team as defined under FIFA eligibility rules; some limited exceptions apply. Players may hold more than one non-FIFA nationality.

No.	Pos.	Nation	Player
8	FW	CYP	Constantinos Nicolaides (to Omonia Aradippou)
10	MF	POR	Belarmino Tavares (released)
9	MF	SEN	Ibrahim Diallo (to ENTHOI Lakatamia)
15	FW	STP	Valter Rocha (released)
4	DF	POL	Daniel Pawlak (released)

=== Elpida Xylofagou ===
In: Note: Flags indicate national team as defined under FIFA eligibility rules; some limited exceptions apply. Players may hold more than one non-FIFA nationality.

No.	Pos.	Nation	Player
26	MF	BUL	Dimitar Petkov (from (Bulgaria) Septemvri Simitli)
8	MF	BUL	Pavel Petkov (from (Bulgaria) Dobrudzha Dobrich)

Out: Note: Flags indicate national team as defined under FIFA eligibility rules; some limited exceptions apply. Players may hold more than one non-FIFA nationality.

No.	Pos.	Nation	Player
9	FW	CYP	Demos Demosthenous (to Achyronas Liopetriou)
11	FW	CYP	Constantinos Constantinou (to Chalkanoras Idaliou)

=== ENAD Polis Chrysochous ===
In: Note: Flags indicate national team as defined under FIFA eligibility rules; some limited exceptions apply. Players may hold more than one non-FIFA nationality.

No.	Pos.	Nation	Player
4	DF	GRE	Nikos Barboudis (free agent)
80	GK	GRE	Grigoris Kiourtzidis (from PAEEK FC)

Out: Note: Flags indicate national team as defined under FIFA eligibility rules; some limited exceptions apply. Players may hold more than one non-FIFA nationality.

No.	Pos.	Nation	Player
94	FW	NED	Osman Kabba (released)
87	FW	CYP	Savvas Pikramenos (to AEZ Zakakiou)
55	DF	CYP	Andreas Papanastasiou (to Ethnikos Assia)

=== Enosis Neon Parekklisia ===
In: Note: Flags indicate national team as defined under FIFA eligibility rules; some limited exceptions apply. Players may hold more than one non-FIFA nationality.

No.	Pos.	Nation	Player
33	FW	ENG	Jordan Palmer-Samuels (from Karmiotissa Polemidion)
15	MF	CYP	Andreas Theofanous (from Omonia Aradippou)

Out: Note: Flags indicate national team as defined under FIFA eligibility rules; some limited exceptions apply. Players may hold more than one non-FIFA nationality.

No.	Pos.	Nation	Player
99	DF	RUS	Elvis Kryukov (to Ayia Napa)

=== ENTHOI Lakatamia ===
In: Note: Flags indicate national team as defined under FIFA eligibility rules; some limited exceptions apply. Players may hold more than one non-FIFA nationality.

No.	Pos.	Nation	Player
77	FW	GRE	Ioannis Sotiroglou (from (Sweden) Akropolis IF)
42	MF	SEN	Ibrahim Diallo (from Digenis Voroklinis)

Out: Note: Flags indicate national team as defined under FIFA eligibility rules; some limited exceptions apply. Players may hold more than one non-FIFA nationality.

No.	Pos.	Nation	Player
24	MF	CYP	Andreas Kallis (to Olympias Lympion)
10	MF	CYP	Petros Filaniotis (released)
61	GK	CYP	Kyriacos Panayiotou (released)
1	GK	CYP	Michalis Varvaritis (released)
30	DF	CYP	Michalis Ioannou (released)
14	MF	GRE	Dimosthenis Aggelinas (released)

=== Karmiotissa Polemidion ===
In: Note: Flags indicate national team as defined under FIFA eligibility rules; some limited exceptions apply. Players may hold more than one non-FIFA nationality.

No.	Pos.	Nation	Player
18	MF	POR	Edgar Marcelino (from (India) Pune)
70	FW	GRE	Dimitrios Popović (on loan from (Greece) PAOK)

Out: Note: Flags indicate national team as defined under FIFA eligibility rules; some limited exceptions apply. Players may hold more than one non-FIFA nationality.

No.	Pos.	Nation	Player
11	FW	ENG	Jordan Palmer-Samuels (to Enosis Neon Parekklisia)

=== Nikos & Sokratis Erimis ===
In: Note: Flags indicate national team as defined under FIFA eligibility rules; some limited exceptions apply. Players may hold more than one non-FIFA nationality.

No.	Pos.	Nation	Player
15	FW	BUL	Georgi Petrov (free agent)
18	DF	BUL	Iliyan Marchev (from (Bulgaria) Botev Vratsa)
81	MF	NGA	John Oyekunle (free agent)

Out: Note: Flags indicate national team as defined under FIFA eligibility rules; some limited exceptions apply. Players may hold more than one non-FIFA nationality.

No.	Pos.	Nation	Player
8	MF	CYP	Ioannis Demetriou (to Amathous Agiou Tychona)
7	FW	HUN	Alexander Ferenc (released)
2	DF	COD	Vinny Mayélé (released)
11	FW	MKD	Roberto Stojkov (released)
10	MF	ENG	Josh Shama (released)
77	FW	CYP	Giorgos Gekas (to Amathous Agiou Tychona)

=== Olympiakos Nicosia ===
In: Note: Flags indicate national team as defined under FIFA eligibility rules; some limited exceptions apply. Players may hold more than one non-FIFA nationality.

No.	Pos.	Nation	Player
99	FW	ZIM	Musa Mguni (from Ayia Napa)
16	DF	GRE	Angelos Papasterianos (from (Greece) Panargiakos)

Out: Note: Flags indicate national team as defined under FIFA eligibility rules; some limited exceptions apply. Players may hold more than one non-FIFA nationality.

No.	Pos.	Nation	Player
70	FW	UKR	Vitalii Doroshenko (released)
5	MF	ESP	David Álvarez (released)
17	DF	ESP	Regino (released)
7	DF	CYP	Nicos Kanetis (released)

=== Omonia Aradippou ===
In: Note: Flags indicate national team as defined under FIFA eligibility rules; some limited exceptions apply. Players may hold more than one non-FIFA nationality.

No.	Pos.	Nation	Player
88	FW	CYP	Constantinos Nicolaides (from Digenis Voroklinis)
77	FW	SLE	Ishmael Danjaji (from Ethnikos Latsion)

Out: Note: Flags indicate national team as defined under FIFA eligibility rules; some limited exceptions apply. Players may hold more than one non-FIFA nationality.

No.	Pos.	Nation	Player
3	DF	CYP	Christoforos Charalambous (to Ethnikos Assia)
46	MF	CYP	Andreas Theofanous (to Enosis Neon Parekklisia)
21	DF	ANG	João Comboio (released)
8	MF	ESP	Hector Micó (released)

=== Othellos Athienou ===
In: Note: Flags indicate national team as defined under FIFA eligibility rules; some limited exceptions apply. Players may hold more than one non-FIFA nationality.

No.	Pos.	Nation	Player
22	FW	TUN	Ismail Sassi (free agent)
19	MF	POR	Rúben Brígido (from Ermis Aradippou)

Out: Note: Flags indicate national team as defined under FIFA eligibility rules; some limited exceptions apply. Players may hold more than one non-FIFA nationality.

No.	Pos.	Nation	Player
30	DF	ROU	Gabriel Frîncu (to ASIL Lysi)
26	MF	CYP	Demetris Christofi (to Ethnikos Latsion)

=== PAEEK FC ===
In: Note: Flags indicate national team as defined under FIFA eligibility rules; some limited exceptions apply. Players may hold more than one non-FIFA nationality.

No.	Pos.	Nation	Player
9	FW	GRE	Thomas Tsitas (from (Greece) Anagennisi Karditsa)
68	MF	GRE	Vasilis Baxevanos (from (Greece) Tyrnavos)

Out: Note: Flags indicate national team as defined under FIFA eligibility rules; some limited exceptions apply. Players may hold more than one non-FIFA nationality.

No.	Pos.	Nation	Player
1	GK	GRE	Grigoris Kiourtzidis (to ENAD Polis Chrysochous)
11	FW	NGA	Boris Odwong (to ENY Digenis Ypsona)
