= Loukas Stylianou =

Cypriot footballer (born 1984)

Personal information
- Full name: Loukas Stylianou
- Date of birth: 5 July 1984 (age 42)
- Place of birth: Nicosia, Cyprus
- Height: 1.86 m (6 ft 1 in)
- Position: Defender

Team information
- Current team: Chalkanoras Idaliou
- Number: 99

Senior career*
Years	Team	Apps	(Gls)
2003–2006	Olympiakos Nicosia	40	(0)
2006–2007	Thrasyvoulos	4	(0)
2007	Omonia Aradippou	2	(0)
2007–2008	Digenis Morphou	13	(0)
2008–2009	Doxa Katokopia	14	(1)
2009	Anorthosis Famagusta	2	(0)
2010–2012	Digenis Morphou	12	(0)
2012–2013	PAEEK FC	18	(3)
2014–	Chalkanoras Idaliou	5	(0)

International career^{‡}
2009	Cyprus	1	(0)
- * Club domestic league appearances and goals as of 17 July 2009 ‡ National team caps and goals as of 9 December 2009

Loukas Stylianou (born 5 July 1984 in Nicosia, Cyprus) is a Cypriot football defender who currently plays for Chalkanoras Idaliou.

Stylianou played for Thrasyvoulos F.C. in the Greek Beta Ethniki during the 2006–07 season. In the summer of 2009 he signed in Anorthosis Famagusta and then for Digenis Morphou.

He has a twin brother, Demetris Stylianou who plays for Ermis Aradippou.
