= Massana =

Massana is a synonym to the Vespolina wine grape. It may also refer to:

== People ==
- Alfred Massana (1891–1924), Spanish footballer and brother of Santiago
- Antoni Massana (1890–1966), Spanish Jesuit priest and composer
- Pedro Massana (1923–1991), Spanish rower who competed in the 1952 Summer Olympics
- Ricardo Massana (1898–1988), Spanish rower who competed in the 1924 Summer Olympics
- Marcelino Massana (1918–1981), Catalan anarchist guerrilla
- Miguel Massana (born 1989), Spanish professional footballer
- Santiago Massana (1889–?), Spanish footballer and brother of Alfred
- Valentí Massana (born 1970), Spanish race walker and the Spanish national record holder in the men's 50 km walk

== Places ==
- La Massana, one of the seven parishes of the Principality of Andorra
  - FS La Massana, an Andorran football club

== Other uses ==
- Massana language, a Chadic language spoken in southern Chad and northern Cameroon by the Masa people
