= Ramiro González =

Ramiro González may refer to:

- Ramiro González (footballer, born 1980), Argentinean footballer
- Ramiro González (footballer, born 1990), Argentine-Chilean footballer
- Ramiro González (politician) (born 1962), Spanish politician
- Ramiro González (mexican personality), born 2001, Mexican personality

== See also ==
- Pedro Gonzalez Gonzalez, who appeared as Ramiro G. Gonzalez on You Bet Your Life
