= Schet =

Schet is a surname. Notable people with the surname include:

- Damiano Schet (born 1990), Dutch footballer
- Mitchell Schet (born 1988), Dutch footballer

== See also ==
- Steve Schets (born 1984), Belgian cyclist
- Schut
