= Nir Mansour =

Israeli footballer (born 1991)

Personal information
- Date of birth: 22 January 1991 (age 35)
- Place of birth: Israel
- Position: Defender

Senior career*
Years	Team	Apps	(Gls)
-2010	Real Madrid CF	0	(0)
	Panathinaikos F.C.	0	(0)
2012-2013	Akritas Chlorakas		
2013-2014	Anagennisi Deryneia FC		
2014/2015	Ayia Napa FC	1	(0)
2014/15-2016	Hapoel Jerusalem F.C.		
2016-2017	Agudat Sport Nordia Jerusalem		
2019-2020	Jerusalem		
- * Club domestic league appearances and goals

Nir Mansour (Hebrew: ניר מנצור; born 22 January 1991) is an Israeli footballer.
