= Gleison (footballer, born 1984) =

Brazilian footballer

Personal information
- Full name: Gleison Rezende Vilela
- Date of birth: 28 December 1984 (age 41)
- Place of birth: Cruzília, Brazil
- Height: 1.72 m (5 ft 8 in)
- Position: Striker

Team information
- Current team: Friburguense

Senior career*
Years	Team	Apps	(Gls)
2004	Taquaritinga	12	(6)
2004–2006	→ AEL Limassol (loan)	32	(14)
2006–2010	Friburguense	60	(34)
2008	→ Bangu (loan)		
2009	→ Comercial (loan)	28	(12)
2010	Figueirense	31	(16)
2011	Democrata GV	24	(11)
2012	Friburguense	12	(8)
2013–2014	Doxa Katokopias	30	(21)
2014–2015	Nea Salamina	27	(20)
2016–	Friburguense		
- * Club domestic league appearances and goals as of 17:23 May (UTC)

Gleison Rezende Vilela (born 28 December 1984), known as Gleison, is a Brazilian professional footballer playing for Nea Salamina in Cypriot First Division as a striker.

== Club career ==
On 1 July 2014 Gleison signed a contract with Cypriot club Nea Salamina.

== Honours ==
- Campeonato Catarinense 2008 in Figueirense
- Copa Rio 2016 in Friburguense
