= Andreas Kittou =

Cypriot footballer (born 1990)

Personal information
- Full name: Andreas Kittou
- Date of birth: 9 September 1990 (age 36)
- Place of birth: Paralimni, Cyprus
- Height: 1.87 m (6 ft 2 in)
- Position: Goalkeeper

Team information
- Current team: Ayia Napa
- Number: 1

Youth career
- 2004–2010: Enosis Neon Paralimni

Senior career*
Years	Team	Apps	(Gls)
2010–2014	Enosis Neon Paralimni	7	(0)
2014–2016	Ayia Napa	28	(0)
2016	Anorthosis	2	(0)
2016–2017	AEL Limassol	1	(0)
2017–	Ayia Napa	45	(0)
- * Club domestic league appearances and goals as of 14:54, 30 March 2019 (UTC)

Andreas Kittou (Greek: Ανδρέας Κίττου; born 9 September 1990 in Paralimni) is a Cypriot football goalkeeper who plays for Ayia Napa.

== Club statistics ==
As of match played 30 March 2019.

Club	Season	League			Cup		Total	
Club	Season	Division	Apps	Goals	Apps	Goals	Apps	Goals
Enosis Neon Paralimni	2010–11	Cypriot First Division	3	0	0	0	3	0
Enosis Neon Paralimni	2011–12	Cypriot First Division	1	0	0	0	1	0
Enosis Neon Paralimni	2012–13	Cypriot First Division	3	0	0	0	3	0
Enosis Neon Paralimni	2013–14	Cypriot First Division	0	0	0	0	0	0
Enosis Neon Paralimni	Total		7	0	0	0	7	0
Ayia Napa	2014–15	Cypriot First Division	15	0	1	0	16	0
Ayia Napa	2015–16	Cypriot First Division	13	0	1	0	14	0
Ayia Napa	Total		28	0	2	0	30	0
Anorthosis	2015–16	Cypriot First Division	2	0	0	0	2	0
AEL Limassol	2016–17	Cypriot First Division	1	0	0	0	1	0
Ayia Napa	2017–18	Cypriot Second Division	20	0	0	0	20	0
Ayia Napa	2018–19	Cypriot Second Division	25	0	0	0	25	0
Ayia Napa	Total		45	0	0	0	45	0
Career total			83	0	2	0	85	0
