= Marios Poutziouris =

Cypriot footballer

Personal information
- Full name: Marios Poutziouris
- Date of birth: 8 December 1993 (age 32)
- Place of birth: Larnaca, Cyprus
- Height: 1.78 m (5 ft 10 in)
- Position: Central midfielder

Team information
- Current team: Ypsonas Krasava
- Number: 18

Youth career
- 2006–2014: Ermis Aradippou

Senior career*
Years	Team	Apps	(Gls)
2010–2014	Ermis Aradippou	27	(1)
2014–2015	Othellos Athienou	31	(1)
2015–2016	Ethnikos Achna	30	(1)
2016–2018	Doxa Katokopias	51	(0)
2018–2019	Ermis Aradippou	19	(0)
2019–2020	Othellos Athienou	16	(3)
2020–2021	Alki Oroklini		
2021–2022	Ermis Aradippou		
2022–2023	Othellos Athienou	22	(1)
2023–	Ypsonas Krasava	17	(2)

International career
2014–2015	Cyprus U21	2	(0)
- * Club domestic league appearances and goals as of 10 June 2024

Marios Poutziouris (Greek: Μάριος Πουτζιουρής; born 8 December 1993) is a Cypriot footballer who plays as a central midfielder for Ypsonas Krasava.

== Career ==
On 17 August 2019, Poutziouris returned to Othellos Athienou.

== Honours ==
- Cypriot Super Cup: 2014
