= Vangelis Kyriakou =

Cyriot association football player

Personal information
- Date of birth: 3 February 1994 (age 32)
- Place of birth: Nicosia, Cyprus
- Height: 1.83 m (6 ft 0 in)
- Position: Right-back

Team information
- Current team: Krasava Ypsonas
- Number: 32

Youth career
- 2012–2014: Olympiakos Nicosia

Senior career*
| Years | Team | Apps | (Gls) |
| 2014–2015 | Othellos Athienou | 12 | (0) |
| 2015–2017 | Aris Limassol | 40 | (0) |
| 2017–2018 | ENP | 26 | (0) |
| 2018–2019 | Anagennisi Deryneia | 24 | (0) |
| 2019–2023 | Olympiakos Nicosia | 79 | (1) |
| 2023–2024 | Doxa Katokopias | 29 | (0) |
| 2024– | Krasava Ypsonas | 49 | (0) |

International career^{‡}
| 2022 | Cyprus | 1 | (0) |
- * Club domestic league appearances and goals as of 14 June 2026 ‡ National team caps and goals as of 3 April 2022

Vangelis Kyriakou (Greek: Βαγγέλης Κυριάκου; born 13 February 1994) is a Cypriot footballer who plays as a right-back for the Cypriot club Krasava Ypsonas.

== Club career ==
Kyriakou began his youth career at Olympiakos Nicosia and moved for his professional career to Othellos Athienou debuting in a 2–1 Cypriot First Division loss to APOEL on 6 October 2014. As per an interview at FIFPRO, he has indicated that his first salary was 3,000 euro per year. He then moved to Aris Limassol in 2015. After a couple of seasons as a starter with Aris, he moved to ENP where he helped the team win the 2017–18 Cypriot Second Division and get promoted. He then had a stint with Anagennisi Deryneia, before transferring to Olympiakos Nicosia his boyhood club in the First Division on 9 July 2019. He was appointed the captain of Olympiakos Nicosia in 2021.

== International career ==
He debuted with the Cyprus national team in a 2–0 2020–21 UEFA Nations League win over Estonia on 29 March 2022.

== Honours ==
ENP

- Cypriot Second Division: 2017-18
