= Moustapha Quaynor =

Ghanaian footballer

Personal information
- Full name: Moustapha Quaynor
- Date of birth: 17 July 1995 (age 31)
- Place of birth: Ghana
- Height: 1.75 m (5 ft 9 in)
- Position: Midfielder

Youth career
- Aduana Stars

Senior career*
Years	Team	Apps	(Gls)
2013	AEL Limassol	0	(0)
2013–2014	→ Alki Larnaca (loan)	20	(0)
2014–2016	→ Ermis Aradippou (loan)	33	(1)
2016	Strathmore	?	(?)
2016	St Albans Saints	2	(0)
2016	Pascoe Vale	32	(1)
2017	Vardar	0	(0)
2017	→ Pelister (loan)	2	(0)
- * Club domestic league appearances and goals as of 15 December 2017

Moustapha Quaynor (born 17 July 1995) is a Ghanaian footballer who most recently played for FK Vardar as a midfielder.

After initially joining FC Strathmore in Australia, Quaynor joined St Albans Saints SC for a brief stint in June 2016 before eventually joining Pascoe Vale FC.
