= Demetris Stylianou =

Cypriot footballer (born 1984)

Personal information
- Full name: Demetris Stylianou
- Date of birth: July 5, 1984 (age 42)
- Place of birth: Nicosia, Cyprus
- Height: 1.82 m (6 ft 0 in)
- Position: Goalkeeper

Team information
- Current team: P.O. Xylotymbou
- Number: 31

Senior career*
Years	Team	Apps	(Gls)
2001–2004	Olympiakos Nicosia	3	(0)
2004–2006	AEL Limassol	29	(0)
2006–2008	Olympiakos Nicosia	34	(0)
2008–2009	AEL Limassol	0	(0)
2009–2010	Ethnikos Achna	1	(0)
2010–2011	Aris Limassol	4	(0)
2011–2014	Alki Larnaca	29	(0)
2014–2017	Ermis Aradippou	33	(0)
2017–2018	Nea Salamina	0	(0)
2018–	P.O. Xylotymbou	13	(0)

International career
2004–2007	Cyprus U21	16	(0)
- * Club domestic league appearances and goals as of 20 April 2018

Demetris Stylianou (Greek: Δημήτρης Στυλιανού; born July 5, 1984, in Nicosia, Cyprus) is a Cypriot football goalkeeper who currently plays for P.O. Xylotymbou in the Cypriot Second Division.

He has a twin brother, Loukas Stylianou who plays for Chalkanoras Idaliou.

== International career ==
Stylianou got his first call up to the senior Cyprus side for 2018 FIFA World Cup qualifiers against Greece and Bosnia and Herzegovina in October 2016.
