= Jerome Agbo =

Ghanaian footballer

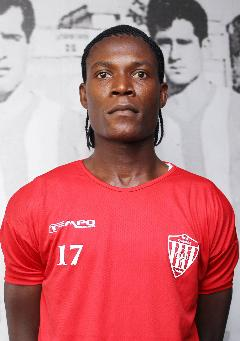

Personal information
- Full name: Jerome Kossi Agbo
- Date of birth: 19 June 1994 (age 32)
- Place of birth: Lomé, Togo
- Height: 5 ft 11 in (1.80 m)
- Position: Centre back

Senior career*
Years	Team	Apps	(Gls)
2012–2014	Nea Salamis	22	(0)
2014–2015	Omonia Aradippou	9	(0)
2015–2016	Digenis Oroklinis	24	(0)
2016–2017	Elpida Xylofagou	26	(1)
- * Club domestic league appearances and goals as of May 2017

Jerome Agbo (born 19 June 1994) is a Ghanaian footballer who last played for Cypriot Third Division side Elpida Xylofagou as a central defender.
