= Paris Andriopoulos =

Greek footballer (born 1994)

Personal information
- Full name: Paraskevas Andriopoulos
- Date of birth: 18 March 1994 (age 32)
- Place of birth: Thessaloniki, Greece
- Height: 1.82 m (6 ft 0 in)
- Position: Forward

Youth career
- 2005–2013: PAOK

Senior career*
| Years | Team | Apps | (Gls) |
| 2012–2013 | PAOK | 0 | (0) |
| 2013 | → Pierikos (loan) | 9 | (2) |
| 2013–2014 | AEL | 3 | (0) |
| 2014–2015 | Olympiakos Nicosia | 22 | (7) |
- * Club domestic league appearances and goals as of 31 May 2015

Paris Andriopoulos (Greek: Πάρης Ανδριόπουλος; born 18 March 1994) is a Greek professional footballer who plays as a forward.
