= Minas Antoniou =

Cypriot footballer (born 1994)

Personal information
- Full name: Minas Antoniou
- Date of birth: 22 February 1994 (age 32)
- Place of birth: Limassol, Cyprus
- Height: 1.85 m (6 ft 1 in)
- Position: Full-back

Team information
- Current team: Omonia Aradippou
- Number: 22

Youth career
- 2009–2012: AEL Limassol

Senior career*
Years	Team	Apps	(Gls)
2012–2015	AEL Limassol	2	(0)
2013–2014	→ Nikos & Sokratis Erimis (loan)	25	(10)
2014–2015	→ AEZ Zakakiou (loan)	22	(2)
2015–2017	Aris Limassol	45	(7)
2017–2019	APOEL	11	(1)
2019	→ Enosis Neon Paralimni (loan)	13	(5)
2019–2022	AEL Limassol	62	(2)
2022–2024	Anorthosis Famagusta	53	(0)
2024–2025	Karmiotissa	26	(1)
2025–	Omonia Aradippou	30	(2)

International career^{‡}
2010–2012	Cyprus U17	3	(0)
2012–2013	Cyprus U19	6	(1)
2014–2016	Cyprus U21	8	(1)
2018–	Cyprus	20	(0)
- * Club domestic league appearances and goals as of 14 June 2026 ‡ National team caps and goals as of 20 June 2024

Minas Antoniou (Greek: Μηνάς Αντωνίου; born 22 February 1994) is a Cypriot footballer who plays as a right wing-back for Cyprus First Division side Omonia Aradippou and the Cyprus national team.

== Club career ==
=== Anorthosis Famagusta ===
On 29 June 2022, Antoniou signed with Cypriot First Division club Anorthosis Famagusta on a two-year contract until 2024.

== International career ==
Anotoniou made his senior international debut on 23 March 2018 in a 0–0 friendly draw with Montenegro.
