= Louis Aniweta =

Footballer (born 1984)

Personal information
- Full name: Louis Aniweta Ifeanyichukwu
- Date of birth: 10 July 1984 (age 42)
- Place of birth: Onitsha, Nigeria
- Height: 1.88 m (6 ft 2 in)
- Position: Defensive midfielder

Youth career
- 2001–2002: Jasper United

Senior career*
Years	Team	Apps	(Gls)
2002–2003	Sporting Clube de Goa	38	(0)
2003–2004	East Bengal	35	(0)
2004–2006	Fransa-Pax FC	38	(0)
2005	→ KS Skënderbeu Korçë (loan)	33	(0)
2006–2007	KS Skënderbeu Korçë	30	(0)
2007–2008	Doxa Katokopias	23	(1)
2008–2009	Alki Larnaca	24	(0)
2009–2010	Nea Salamis Famagusta FC	20	(0)
2010–2011	APOP Kinyras	21	(0)
2011–2013	APEP	37	(4)
2013–2014	Ayia Napa	5	(0)
2014	APEP	12	(0)
2015	Pafos	3	(0)
2015–2016	ENAD Polis Chrysochous	19	(2)

International career
2009–2010	Rwanda	4	(0)
- * Club domestic league appearances and goals

Louis Aniweta Ifeanychukwu (born 10 July 1984) is a former professional footballer who played as a defensive midfielder. Born in Nigeria, he made four appearances for the Rwanda national team in 2009–10.

== Career ==
Aniweta was born in Onitsha, Anambra State, Nigeria. His previous team were Alki Larnaca and Doxa Katokopias. From 2005 to 2006 he played for KS Skënderbeu Korçë in the Albanian Superliga. Before that he played for Mohammedan AC.
