= Ramiro González (footballer, born 1980) =

Argentinean footballer

Ramiro Gonzalez
Personal information
- Full name: Ramiro Daniel Gonzalez
- Date of birth: 23 July 1980 (age 46)
- Place of birth: Argentina
- Position: Goalkeeper

Senior career*
Years	Team	Apps	(Gls)
199x–2000	Marseille	0	(0)
2000–2001	Airdrieonians	8	(0)
2001–2002	Ross County	3	(0)
2002	Real Ávila	7	(0)
2003–2004	Raith Rovers	24	(0)
2004–2006	La Plata	54	(0)
20xx–2007	Calahorra		
2007–2008	Marino	7	(0)
20xx–2009	Alki Larnaca		
2009–2011	Chalkanoras Idaliou		
2011	Montrose	14	(0)
2011–20xx	Ethnikos Assia		
- Omonia Aradippou
- * Club domestic league appearances and goals

Ramiro Gonzalez (born 23 July 1980) is an Argentinean former professional footballer who played as a goalkeeper. He works as the owner of RG Goalkeeper Gloves in his home country.

== Career ==
Born in Argentina, Gonzalez started his senior career with Olympique de Marseille. In 2000, he signed for Airdrieonians in the Scottish Championship, where he made eight league appearances and scored zero goals. After that, he played for Ross County, Real Ávila CF, Raith Rovers, La Plata Fútbol Club, CD Calahorra, Marino de Luanco, Alki Larnaca, Chalkanoras Idaliou, Montrose, Ethnikos Assia, and Omonia Aradippou before retiring.
