= Niamien Rodolph Amessan =

Ivorian footballer (born 1990)

Christo
Personal information
- Full name: Rodolph Niamien Amessan
- Date of birth: 27 September 1990 (age 36)
- Place of birth: Abidjan, Ivory Coast
- Height: 1.77 m (5 ft 10 in)
- Position: Winger

Team information
- Current team: Alcains
- Number: 10

Youth career
- 2008–2009: Académica

Senior career*
Years	Team	Apps	(Gls)
2019–2013	Académica	8	(0)
2009–2010	→ Tourizense (loan)	22	(3)
2011	→ Sporting Covilhã (loan)	14	(5)
2011–2012	→ US Créteil (loan)	18	(0)
2012–2013	→ Arouca (loan)	16	(2)
2013–2015	Ethnikos Achna	41	(2)
2015	União da Madeira	22	(1)
2015–2016	Famalicão	18	(3)
2016–2017	União de Leiria	12	(2)
2017	Racing-Union	6	(0)
2017–2018	Olhanense		
2018–2019	Onisilos Sotira	25	(13)
2019–2020	ASIL Lysi	7	(0)
2020	Ayia Napa	8	(1)
2020–2021	Sporting Covilhã	0	(0)
2021–2022	Alcains	34	(12)
2022–2023	Olhanense	12	(2)
2023	Carvalhais	9	(0)
2023–	Alcains	9	(1)
- * Club domestic league appearances and goals as of 16:47, 19 November 2023 (UTC)

Rodolph Niamen Amessan (born 27 September 1990), known as Christo, is an Ivorian professional footballer who plays as a winger for Alcains.

== Career ==
Christo signed for Olhanense, playing in the Campeonato de Portugal, for the 2017–18 season. On 23 May 2019, it was announced that Christo had joined ASIL Lysi of the Cypriot Second Division. After making seven appearances, he left the club on 2 January 2020 to join Ayia Napa, also in the Second Division.
