= Miguel Massana =

Spanish footballer

Miki Massana
Personal information
- Full name: Miquel Massana Macià
- Date of birth: 11 May 1989 (age 37)
- Place of birth: Lleida, Spain
- Height: 1.84 m (6 ft 0 in)
- Position: Midfielder

Youth career
- Lleida

Senior career*
Years	Team	Apps	(Gls)
2008–2011	Lleida	32	(0)
2011–2013	Lleida Esportiu	63	(2)
2013	Niki Volos	0	(0)
2013–2014	Santboià	12	(0)
2014	Amorebieta	15	(0)
2014–2015	AEK Larnaca	15	(0)
2015–2016	Ascó	35	(1)
2016–2017	Balaguer	28	(2)
- * Club domestic league appearances and goals as of 28 May 2017

Miguel 'Miki' Massana Macià (born 11 May 1989) is a Spanish professional footballer who plays as a midfielder.

Born in Lleida, Catalonia, Massana's professional input consisted of 15 games in the Cypriot First Division with AEK Larnaca FC, where he shared teams with a host of compatriots.
