= Damiano Schet =

Dutch footballer (born 1990)

Personal information
- Full name: Damiano Schet
- Date of birth: 8 April 1990 (age 36)
- Place of birth: Amsterdam, Netherlands
- Height: 1.78 m (5 ft 10 in)
- Position: Winger

Youth career
- Haarlem

Senior career*
Years	Team	Apps	(Gls)
2009–2010	Haarlem	0	(0)
2010–2011	IJsselmeervogels	24	(4)
2011–2013	Rijnsburgse Boys	47	(12)
2013	RKC Waalwijk	25	(2)
2014	AEK Larnaca	0	(0)
2014–2015	SC Cambuur	3	(0)
2015	Telstar	8	(0)
2016	FC Oss	13	(1)
2016–2017	Den Bosch	16	(3)
2017–2019	Katwijk	45	(3)
2019–2020	GVVV	11	(0)
2020–2021	Sportlust '46		
- * Club domestic league appearances and goals as of 17:15, 31 January 2022 (UTC)

Damiano Schet (born 8 April 1990, in Amsterdam) is a Dutch professional footballer who plays as a winger.

He formerly played for Haarlem, IJsselmeervogels, Rijnsburgse Boys, RKC Waalwijk, AEK Larnaca, SC Cambuur, Telstar and FC Oss.

== Career ==
=== Club career ===
In May 2019, Schet signed a deal with GVVV in the Dutch Tweede Divisie for the 2019–20 season. However, at the end of January 2020 it was confirmed, that Schet would leave the club at the end of the season.

In August 2020, Schet joined Sportlust '46.
