= Dimitris Christofi (footballer, born 1994) =

Cypriot footballer (born 1994)

Personal information
- Full name: Dimitris Christofi
- Date of birth: August 25, 1994 (age 32)
- Place of birth: Paphos, Cyprus
- Positions: Defensive midfielder; right back

Youth career
- 2011–2013: AEP Paphos

Senior career*
Years	Team	Apps	(Gls)
2013–2014	AEP Paphos	24	(0)
2014–2015	Olympiakos Nicosia	19	(0)
- * Club domestic league appearances and goals as of 09:00, 19 August 2015 (UTC) ‡ National team caps and goals as of 19 August 2015

Dimitris Christofi (Greek: Δημήτρης Χριστοφή; born 25 August 1994) is a Cypriot footballer who played for Olympiakos Nicosia as a midfielder. Christofi is a product of the AEP Paphos academy.
