= Boris Odwong =

Italian association football player (born 1991)

Personal information
- Full name: Boris Ofadim Odwong
- Date of birth: 20 January 1991 (age 35)
- Place of birth: Italy
- Height: 1.91 m (6 ft 3 in)
- Position: Striker

Youth career
- U.C. Sampdoria

Senior career*
Years	Team	Apps	(Gls)
2009–20xx	AS Viterbese Calcio		
- Termoidraulica Bari F.M.A.
2010/2011	ASD Savio Calcio		
2010/2011	A.C.D. Nardò		
2011	Floriana F.C.	8	(1)
2011–2012	Naxxar Lions F.C.		
2012–20xx	Rapid Ghidighici	27	(0)
2013–2014	Kalamata F.C.		
2014–2015	APEP FC	24	(4)
2015–2016	PAEEK	14	(2)
2016	Enosi Neon Ypsona-Digenis Ipsona	13	(4)
2016	Voluntas Calcio Spoleto		
2016–2017	A.E. Karaiskakis F.C.		
2017	Asteras Amaliadas		
2017	Tsiklitiras Pylos F.C.		
2018	Doxa Vyronas F.C.		
2018-2020	Nafplio 2017 F.C.		
2020-	Panargeiakos F.C.		
- * Club domestic league appearances and goals

Boris Odwong (Greek: Μπόρις Οντβόνγκ born 20 January 1991) is an Italian footballer who is last known to have played for Doxa Vyronas.

== Career ==
=== Malta ===
Staying with Floriana until the end of 2011, Odwong debuted in a 2–02 win over Mqabba. Drawing interest from Naxxar Lions, he score d three goals versus Birżebbuġa St. Peter's 4–2.

=== Moldova ===
Signing with Rapid Ghidighici approaching March 2012, the Sampdoria youth trainee was suspended by Rapid midway through November that year for giving tepid performances and unsportsmanlike behavior according to the management. When Greece's Kalamata requested that they give them the documents for the Nigerian-Italian, the Moldovan Football Federation responded that he was unavailable. In total, he made 7 appearances and did not score a goal in the Moldovan National Division.

== Personal life ==
Born in Italy, Odwong was raised in Rome, Italy.
