= Dion Esajas =

Dutch footballer

Personal information
- Full name: Dion Esajas
- Date of birth: 7 November 1980 (age 45)
- Place of birth: Amsterdam, Netherlands
- Height: 1.85 m (6 ft 1 in)
- Position: Forward

Senior career*
Years	Team	Apps	(Gls)
1997–2000	Haarlem	86	(19)
2000–2004	Volendam	90	(30)
2004–2006	Zwolle	58	(13)
2006–2007	Paderborn	6	(0)
2008	Quick Boys		
2009	Lisse		
2009–2010	Akritas Chlorakas	24	(4)
2010–2011	PAEEK	24	(5)
2011–2012	AEK Kouklia	25	(21)
2012–2013	Karmiotissa	23	(15)
2013–2014	ENAD Polis Chrysochous	21	(16)
2014–2015	Anagennisi Deryneia	15	(1)
2014	Akritas Chlorakas	5	(4)
- Nieuw Utrecht
2016–2020	EDO		

International career
1996-1997	Netherlands U17	3	(0)
1997	Netherlands U18	3	(0)
- * Club domestic league appearances and goals as of 17 October 2015

Dion Esajas (born 7 November 1980 in Amsterdam, Netherlands) is a retired football forward.

== Club career ==
He started his professional career with Haarlem in 1997, making his debut on 14 March 1998 in a 3–3 draw against Excelsior. He later moved to FC Volendam, where he played his only season in the Eredivisie, which was 2003–04. He later played for FC Zwolle and in 2006 moved to Germany, where he had a disappointing spell with SC Paderborn 07 and then returned to Netherlands to play with Quick Boys. After a season in Holland, he moved abroad to play in Cyprus for several years when he signed for Akritas Chlorakas. He also played for PAEEK, AEK Kouklia, Karmiotissa, ENAD Polis Chrysochous and Anagennisi Dherynia before returning to Holland.

In summer 2016, Esajas joined EDO from fellow amateur side Nieuw Utrecht.

== International career ==
Esajas played 3 games for the Netherlands national under-17 football team
