= Jamie Amihere Moore =

English footballer

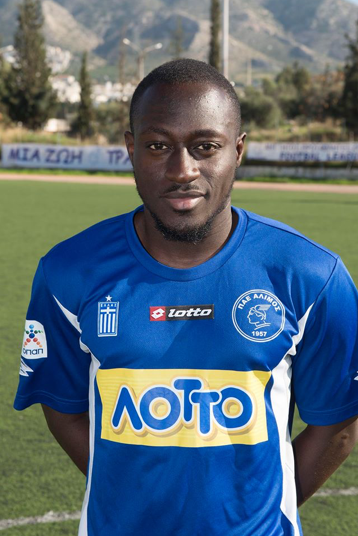

Personal information
- Date of birth: 19 March 1992 (age 34)
- Place of birth: Newham, London, England
- Position: Attacking midfielder

Senior career*
Years	Team	Apps	(Gls)
2013–2014	PO Ormidia	26	(12)
2014	Ethnikos Achna	0	(0)
2014–2015	→ A.O.T Alimos	7	(0)
- * Club domestic league appearances and goals as of 20:43, 27 December 2015 (UTC)

Jamie Amihere Moore (born 19 March 1992) is an English former professional footballer. He played as an attacking midfielder but could also play as a winger or forward.

== Career ==
Moore started his career in 2012 with PO Ormidia in the Third Division in Cyprus.

In July 2014, he joined Ethnikos Achna of the Cypriot First Division where he failed to make a league appearance for the Cypriot Side.

In September 2014, he signed for Football League (Greece) side A.O.T. Alimos F.C.
