= Jhonatan Rojas =

Colombian footballer (born 1988)

Personal information
- Full name: Jhonatan Rojas Restrepo
- Date of birth: 8 June 1988 (age 38)
- Place of birth: Pereira, Colombia
- Height: 1.76 m (5 ft 9 in)
- Positions: Attacking midfielder; striker

Youth career
- Deportivo Pereira
- Real Sociedad

Senior career*
Years	Team	Apps	(Gls)
2006–2008	Ariznabarra	45	(23)
2008–2009	Deportivo Alavés B	6	(1)
2009–2010	Harrow Borough	20	(3)
2010–2011	Lakua de Vitoria	29	(12)
2011–2012	Apollon Limassol	0	(0)
2013–2014	AEP Paphos FC		
2014–	AEZ Zakakiou		
- * Club domestic league appearances and goals

Jhonatan Rojas Restrepo (born 8 June 1988) is a Colombian footballer who plays for Cypriot First Division Club AEZ Zakakiou, as an attacking midfielder or striker, although he also can play as left-back.
