= Omonia Aradippou =

Cypriot football club

Omonoia Aradippou
- Full name: Omonoia Aradippou
- Nickname: Περιστέρια (Doves)
- Founded: 4 April 1929; 97 years ago
- Stadium: Antonis Papadopoulos Stadium Larnaca
- Capacity: 1,500
- Chairman: Costas Christoforou
- Manager: Ioannis Okkas
- League: First Division
- 2025–26: First Division, 9th of 14
- Website: omonoiaaradippou.com
Home colours	Away colours

Omonoia Aradippou (Greek: Ομόνοια Αραδίππου) is a Cypriot professional football club based in the Municipality of Aradippou, a settlement in the outskirts of the city of Larnaca.

The club was founded on 4 April 1929 and they were the Champions of the Cypriot Second Division for the season 2023–24. For the season 2025-26 they will compete again in the Cypriot First Division.

They have competed in the Cypriot First Division several times in the past. The 1995–1996 season was their most recent one in the First Division.

== Home Ground ==
Omonia Aradippou play their home games at the Municipal Aradippou stadium, but for the season 2024-25 the Antonis Papadopoulos Stadium will be their host

== Unification Tries ==
Omonia Aradippou has a long-standing rivalry with their neighboring club Ermis Aradippou.

However, through the years and decades there have been several tries and cases where both sides have negotiated their unification on a football level. The negotiations have always been brought down due to different economic and political issues raised by either sides.

People of Aradippou agree though that the Municipality of Aradippou should have had one and only football team, rather than the people been separated for economic and political issues. However, yet there has not been a settlement.

Thus Omonoia Aradippou will compete in the Cypriot First Division for the season 2025-26.

== Culture and Folklore Association ==
The Club is also affiliated with a Cultural and Folklore Association on an organized basis since 1981. The Cultural and Folklore Association covers a variety of issues (national, economic, social, cultural) with artistic events, lectures, demonstrations, street markets, blood donations and other activities.

== Current squad ==
As of 15 September 2026

No.	Pos.	Nation	Player
1	GK	BRA	Gabriel Pereira (on loan from APOEL)
2	MF	CYP	Andreas Soulis
3	DF	CYP	Andreas Christofi
5	MF	FRA	Adel Beggah
7	FW	CYP	Michalis Koumouris
8	MF	NED	Achraf El Bouchataoui
9	FW	CYP	Giorgos Pontikos
10	FW	GER	Josué Schmidt
11	FW	CYP	Konstantinos Anthimou
12	GK	SRB	Živko Živković
14	MF	NED	Jeremy van Mullem
15	DF	ESP	Unai García
17	DF	CYP	Efthymios Efthymiou
20	DF	ESP	Jairo Izquierdo
21	MF	CYP	Konstantinos Evripidou
22	DF	CYP	Minas Antoniou

No.	Pos.	Nation	Player
23	FW	SRB	Bogdan Petrović (on loan from Bačka Topola)
25	DF	CYP	Andreas Nikolaou
31	FW	ARG	Sebastián Lomónaco (on loan from Godoy Cruz)
34	DF	NED	Danny Henriques
35	MF	CYP	Paris Polykarpou
37	MF	CYP	Antonis Loizou
38	FW	GLP	Ange-Freddy Plumain
41	FW	VEN	Mathias Gonzalez (on loan from AEK Larnaca)
47	DF	CYP	Andreas Pappoulos
61	GK	CYP	Pavlos Papadopoulos
77	FW	GAB	Curtis Junior (on loan from AC Omonia)
81	DF	SVK	Vernon De Marco
88	GK	CYP	Giorgos Papacharalampous
91	DF	CYP	Konstantinos Panteli
93	MF	CYP	Giorgos Chatzigianni

=== Out on loan ===
Note: Flags indicate national team as defined under FIFA eligibility rules; some limited exceptions apply. Players may hold more than one non-FIFA nationality.

No.	Pos.	Nation	Player
—	MF	CYP	Antonis Loizou (at Livadia until 31 May 2026)

=== Technical staff ===
Position	Staff
Head coach	(Cyprus) Ioannis Okkas
Team manager	(Cyprus) George Eracleous
Assistant coach	(Cyprus) Christos Pierettis
Assistant coach	(Cyprus) Michalis Karatzis
Goalkeeper coach	(Cyprus) Andreas Kittos
Fitness coach	(Cyprus) Ioannis Koumis
Fitness coach	(Cyprus) Stavros Parpas
Physiotherapist	(Cyprus) Vasilis Milloshias
Physiotherapist	(Cyprus) Konstantinos Chatzittooulis

== Honours ==
- Cypriot Second Division
  - Champions (3): 1977–1978, 1992–1993, 2023–2024
