= Ayia Napa FC =

Cypriot football club

AO Ayia Napa
- Full name: Athlitikos Omilos Ayias Napas
- Founded: 14 July 1990; 36 years ago
- Ground: Paralimni Stadium, Paralimni
- Capacity: 5,800
- Chairman: Dr. Sergis Sergiou
- Manager: Vacant
- League: Second Division
- 2025–26: Second Division, 6th of 16
| Home colours | Away colours |

Athlitikos Omilos Ayia Napa (Greek: Αθλητικός Όμιλος Αγία Νάπα, Athletic Club Ayia Napa) is a Cypriot football club from the town of Ayia Napa. The club was founded in 1990 after the merger of two clubs: APEAN (Athlitiki Podosfairiki Enosis Ayias Napas; "Athletic Football Union of Ayia Napa") and ENAN (Enosis Neon Ayias Napas; "Youth Union Ayia Napa").

== History ==
The club started in the Third Division (1990–91). They were promoted to Second Division in season 2000–01 after finishing 2nd in Third division. The team once played against Omonia Nicosia in Cup tournament. It lost 4–0 in the first match but came 2–2 in the second match.

=== Promotion to First Division ===
The biggest achievement of AO Ayia Napa's history was in the 2005–06 season after the team finished 3rd in Cypriot Second Division and was promoted to the Cypriot First Division. Despite it being their maiden appearance in the First Division, Ayia Napa proved a formidable force for other First Division sides in the 2006–07 season. In their first match in the division, they achieved a surprise away draw against Anorthosis Famagusta, which were followed by two more draws, including one against First Division Heavyweights Omonia Nicosia. In their first 12 matches overall they achieved several draws, including another home draw against APOEL. However, they had to wait until the 13th matchday for their first victory, when the team beat Aris Limassol 4–1. By the midway point of the season, the team had lost just 5 times. On 14 January 2007, in the reverse fixture of their earlier draw, Ayia Napa beat Omonia Nicosia 2–1, arguably the most impressive result in the clubs' history. After that victory there were a few more successful results and the club looked like they may avoid relegation. However, the team lost their last seven First Division matches of the season and ended up relegated.

=== Cup qualification to the Quarter-finals ===
Another big achievement of Ayia Napa FC is the qualification to the cup's quarter-finals group stage in the 2007–08 season while the team was in the Cypriot Second Division. That season was the only team from Cypriot Second Division that qualified to quarter-finals. The club finished third in the group stages with wins against APOEL and Aris Limassol.

== Stadium ==
The team's stadium is Municipal Stadium of Ayia Napa, which is a multi-use stadium in Ayia Napa. It is currently used mostly for football matches and holds 2,000 people. However the stadium was not suitable for first division matches, so for the season 2006–07, when Ayia Napa plays in First Division, the team is using for home the Tasos Markou Stadium in Paralimni.

The UEFA European Under-19 Football Championship was hosted in Cyprus in 1998 and the UEFA European Under-16 Football Championship in 1992 and the Ayia Napa Stadium was used for two matches of Republic of Ireland in each competition; on 19 June 1998, their 5–2 victory against Croatia and four days later, their 3–0 Cyprus U-19 national team and qualified to the final where they went on to win the trophy. In 1992, the Irish were beaten by the Netherlands U-16 0–2 and tied by Spain 1–1.

== Players ==
As of 15 September 2026

Note: Flags indicate national team as defined under FIFA eligibility rules; some limited exceptions apply. Players may hold more than one non-FIFA nationality.

| No. | Pos. | Nation | Player |
|---|---|---|---|
| 1 | GK | CYP | Rafail Pittatziis |
| 3 | DF | CYP | Chrysostomos Ioakim |
| 4 | DF | CYP | Ioannis Rossos |
| 7 | FW | CYP | Giorgos Kikillos |
| 8 | MF | CYP | Gerasimos Fylaktou |
| 9 | FW | CYP | Panagiotis Ilia |
| 10 | MF | GRE | Vasilios Angelopoulos |
| 11 | FW | MDA | Nicolae Milinceanu (captain) |
| 16 | MF | CYP | Orestis Panagiotou (on loan from Ethnikos Achna) |
| 17 | MF | MDA | Cătălin Carp |
| 22 | DF | USA | Giorgos Mavrommatis |
| 23 | MF | CYP | Periklis Perikleous |

| No. | Pos. | Nation | Player |
|---|---|---|---|
| 24 | MF | ISR | Guy Kimhi |
| 26 | GK | CYP | Andreas Chatziprodromou |
| 27 | FW | CYP | Kyriakos Kimitri |
| 30 | MF | CYP | Stefanos Vasiliou |
| 33 | DF | GRE | Giannis Giorgalis |
| 35 | DF | NGR | Peter Ofornadu |
| 38 | FW | GRE | Georgios Vrettas |
| 41 | DF | CYP | Panagiotis Loizidis |
| 90 | FW | GRE | Christos Kountouriotis |
| — | MF | ITA | Matteo Martina |
| — | FW | CYP | Omiros Katsiou |
| — | MF | GRE | Christos Diamantopoulos |
| — | FW | GRE | Stefanos Paraskevopoulos |

== Managers ==
- (Greece) Nikos Kolompourdas (16 January 2013 – 25 February 2013)
- (Cyprus) Costas Loizou (26 February 2013 – 5 April 2013)
- (Cyprus) Marios Neophytou (5 April 2013 – 21 October 2013)
- (Cyprus) Zouvanis Zouvani (24 October 2013 – 13 January 2014)
- (Serbia) Dušan Mitošević (14 January 2014 – 17 April 2014)
- (Cyprus) Nikos Andronikou (6 June 2014 – 30 September 2014)
- (Cyprus) Giorgos Kosma (23 October 2014 – 28 January 2016)
- (Cyprus) Antonis Mertakkas (28 January 2016 – 14 February 2016)

== Honours ==
- Cypriot Second Division
  - Champions (2): 2011–12, 2013–14
