= List of Cypriot football transfers summer 2016 =

This is a list of Cypriot football transfers for the 2016–17 summer transfer window by club. Only transfers of clubs in the Cypriot First Division and Cypriot Second Division are included.

The summer transfer window opened on 9 June 2016, although a few transfers took place prior to that date. The window closed at midnight on 31 August 2016. Players without a club may join one at any time, either during or in between transfer windows.

== Cypriot First Division ==
=== AEK Larnaca ===
In: Note: Flags indicate national team as defined under FIFA eligibility rules; some limited exceptions apply. Players may hold more than one non-FIFA nationality.

No.	Pos.	Nation	Player
1	GK	CYP	Antonis Georgallides (from Omonia)
4	DF	ESP	Joan Truyols (from (Spain) Mallorca)
8	MF	ESP	Acorán (from (Spain) Ponferradina)
15	GK	ESP	Rubén Miño (from (Spain) Real Oviedo)
16	DF	CYP	Thomas Ioannou (from Pafos FC)
19	DF	ESP	Javier Garrido (from (Spain) Las Palmas)
70	MF	CYP	Constantinos Charalambides (from APOEL)

Out: Note: Flags indicate national team as defined under FIFA eligibility rules; some limited exceptions apply. Players may hold more than one non-FIFA nationality.

No.	Pos.	Nation	Player
1	GK	POL	Mateusz Taudul (on loan to AEZ Zakakiou)
3	DF	POL	Adam Marciniak (to (Poland) Arka Gdynia)
4	DF	ESP	Albert Serrán (to Doxa Katokopias)
13	GK	ESP	Mikel Saizar (released)
15	DF	CYP	Constantinos Kastanas (to Othellos Athienou)
16	DF	ROU	Emil Ninu (to (Israel) Hapoel Bnei Lod)
17	FW	CYP	Vassilis Chatzigiannakou (to Anagennisi Deryneia)
19	FW	CYP	Nestoras Mitidis (to (Netherlands) Roda JC Kerkrade)
23	FW	CYP	Demetris Kyprianou (to Ethnikos Achna)
25	GK	ESP	Toño (to (Spain) Real Sociedad)
28	FW	CYP	Constantinos Anthimou (to Othellos Athienou)
70	MF	BRA	Farley Rosa (loan return to (Brazil) Monte Azul)
—	MF	CYP	Paraskevas Choutris (to ASIL)
—	MF	CYP	Christoforos Kourtis (to ASIL)

=== AEL Limassol ===
In: Note: Flags indicate national team as defined under FIFA eligibility rules; some limited exceptions apply. Players may hold more than one non-FIFA nationality.

No.	Pos.	Nation	Player
1	GK	VEN	Rafael Romo (from (Italy) Udinese)
2	DF	CYP	Dossa Júnior (from (Turkey) Konyaspor)
5	MF	CPV	Babanco (from (Portugal) Estoril)
7	MF	HAI	Emmanuel Sarki (from (Poland) Wisła Kraków)
8	MF	BRA	Lucas Souza (from (Portugal) Tondela)
9	FW	ANG	Aguinaldo (from Doxa Katokopias)
10	MF	CIV	Aly Savane (from (Angola) Benfica de Luanda)
11	FW	ESP	Mikel Arruabarrena (from (Spain) Eibar)
12	MF	CYP	Marios Nicolaou (from (Finland) Inter Turku)
13	DF	HAI	Kevin Lafrance (from (Poland) Chrobry Głogów)
25	DF	ANG	Núrio Fortuna (on loan from (Portugal) Braga B)
31	GK	CYP	Andreas Kittos (from Anorthosis)
35	FW	CYP	Marios Elia (from Ethnikos Achna)
40	DF	CYP	Charis Kyriakou (from Ethnikos Achna)
83	MF	BRA	Danilo Bueno (from (Brazil) Botafogo Ribeirão Preto)
87	MF	GRE	Giorgos Georgiadis (from (Greece) Veria)
99	FW	BRA	Wellington (from (Romania) Pandurii Târgu Jiu)

Out: Note: Flags indicate national team as defined under FIFA eligibility rules; some limited exceptions apply. Players may hold more than one non-FIFA nationality.

No.	Pos.	Nation	Player
1	GK	POL	Łukasz Skowron (released)
3	DF	FRA	Bertrand Robert (to (Greece) Panthrakikos)
7	MF	VEN	Frank Feltscher (released)
8	MF	FRA	Mathieu Coutadeur (to (France) Stade Lavallois)
10	MF	CYP	Andreas Stavrou (to Karmiotissa)
22	FW	ROU	Mihai Dina (to (Romania) Râmnicu Vâlcea)
27	DF	CYP	Georgios Eleftheriou (to Nea Salamina)
28	MF	CYP	Antonis Vasiliou (to (Greece) Panachaiki)
29	FW	POL	Arkadiusz Piech (loan return to (Poland) Legia Warsaw)
32	GK	ARG	Matías Degra (to (Greece) AEL)
33	MF	MKD	Ostoja Stjepanović (to (Poland) Śląsk Wrocław)
50	DF	POR	João Paulo (released)
56	MF	CYP	Panos Theodorou (to Karmiotissa)
77	FW	ESP	Adrián Sardinero (to Apollon Limassol)
79	MF	CRO	Adnan Aganovic (to (Romania) Steaua București)
81	MF	CYP	Andreas Frangos (on loan to Aris Limassol)
94	MF	GHA	Carlos Ohene (to (Bulgaria) Beroe Stara Zagora)
99	DF	CYP	Evanthis Ioannou (to ENY Digenis Ypsona)

=== AEZ Zakakiou ===
In: Note: Flags indicate national team as defined under FIFA eligibility rules; some limited exceptions apply. Players may hold more than one non-FIFA nationality.

No.	Pos.	Nation	Player
9	FW	CYP	Andreas Pittaras (from Othellos Athienou)
32	MF	CYP	Antonis Katsis (from Ayia Napa)
15	DF	SRB	Nebojša Skopljak (from Ayia Napa)
3	DF	GRE	Lefteris Sakellariou (free agent)
7	FW	TUN	Ismail Sassi (from Othellos Athienou)
99	FW	CYP	Kristis Andreou (from Ayia Napa)
1	GK	CYP	Athos Chrysostomou (from Ermis Aradippou)
90	GK	CYP	Ellinas Sofroniou (from Nikos & Sokratis Erimis)
23	FW	GRE	Konstantinos Pangalos (from (Greece) Platanias)
22	DF	CYP	Christos Antoniou (from Apollon Limassol)
11	MF	CYP	Yiannis Pachipis (from Olympiakos Nicosia)
21	GK	POL	Mateusz Taudul (on loan from AEK Larnaca)
8	DF	BRA	Marco Aurélio (from Aris Limassol)
28	FW	ARG	Francisco Di Franco (on loan from Apollon Limassol)
4	MF	MWI	Tawonga Chimodzi (from (Greece) Platanias)
95	FW	BRA	Endrick (on loan from Apollon Limassol)
88	FW	CIV	Félicien Gbedinyessi (from ASIL)
10	MF	ARG	Nicolás Villafañe (from (Greece) Sparti)
25	DF	BRA	Douglas (from (Brazil) Monte Azul)
77	DF	CYP	Athos Solomou (from (Iran) Rah Ahan)
89	FW	BRA	Romão (from (Brazil) América FC)
14	MF	POR	Lisandro Semedo (from (England) Reading Reserves)

Out: Note: Flags indicate national team as defined under FIFA eligibility rules; some limited exceptions apply. Players may hold more than one non-FIFA nationality.

No.	Pos.	Nation	Player
1	GK	CYP	Michalis Photiou (to APEA Akrotiriou)
4	DF	CYP	Theodoros Kanetis (to APEP)
6	MF	CYP	Sergios Panayiotou (to Ayia Napa)
7	MF	CYP	Christos Nicolaou (to Enosis Neon Parekklisia)
8	MF	GRE	Vasilios Emmanouil (to PAEEK FC)
9	FW	CYP	Andreas Papathanasiou (to Alki Oroklini)
10	MF	CYP	Alexandros Garpozis (retired)
11	FW	GRE	Minas Chalkiadakis (released)
12	MF	CYP	Michalis Polydorou (to ENY Digenis Ypsona)
14	DF	CYP	Stavrinos Stylianou (to APEA Akrotiriou)
19	GK	CYP	Charalambos Kairinos (to Karmiotissa Polemidion)
20	FW	CYP	Nicolas Christodoulou (to APEA Akrotiriou)
26	GK	GRE	Stylianos Tentonis (to APEP)
33	FW	CYP	Andreas Christou (to Ayia Napa)
39	FW	GRE	Taxiarchis Thanelas (to Akritas Chlorakas)
50	DF	CYP	Constantinos Alexandrou (to APEP)
87	DF	CYP	Savvas Pikramenos (to Pafos FC)

=== Anagennisi Deryneia ===
In: Note: Flags indicate national team as defined under FIFA eligibility rules; some limited exceptions apply. Players may hold more than one non-FIFA nationality.

No.	Pos.	Nation	Player
3	DF	CYP	Nicos Efthymiou (from Othellos Athienou)
28	MF	POR	Rúben Brígido (from Othellos Athienou)
54	GK	POR	Jorge Vieira (from Karmiotissa)
70	FW	CYP	Vassilis Chatzigiannakou (from AEK Larnaca)
22	MF	ARM	Artur Yuspashyan (from (Armenia) Pyunik)
10	MF	GRE	Alexandros Natsiopoulos (from (Greece) Lamia)
45	MF	CYP	Georgios Christodoulou (on loan from APOEL)
20	FW	POR	José Emílio Furtado (from (Greece) Panserraikos)
11	MF	MNE	Vasko Kalezić (from (Moldova) Dacia)
25	DF	CYP	Rafael Anastasiou (on loan from APOEL)
19	DF	GRE	Nikos Barboudis (from ENAD Polis Chrysochous)
56	MF	ENG	Alistair Slowe (from Ayia Napa)
4	DF	CRO	Tomas Maricic (from (Australia) Adelaide Olympic)

Out: Note: Flags indicate national team as defined under FIFA eligibility rules; some limited exceptions apply. Players may hold more than one non-FIFA nationality.

No.	Pos.	Nation	Player
3	MF	CYP	Antonis Ioannou (loan return to Enosis Neon Paralimni)
4	DF	CYP	Kyriakos Krasas (to Digenis Akritas Morphou)
6	MF	FRA	Louis Malandjou (to Ormideia FC)
10	FW	CYP	Andreas Koullouris (to Achyronas Liopetriou)
11	FW	CYP	Martinos Solomou (to Onisilos Sotira 2014)
12	GK	CYP	Panayiotis Mertakkas (released)
17	MF	GHA	Samad Oppong (to PAEEK FC)
23	DF	CYP	Constantinos Kafkarkou (to Elpida Xylofagou)
55	DF	CYP	Antonis Moushis (to Enosis Neon Paralimni)
80	MF	CYP	Georgios Koutouna (to Achyronas Liopetriou)
89	GK	CYP	Ioannis Kasiakkis (on loan to Ayia Napa)

=== Anorthosis Famagusta ===
In: Note: Flags indicate national team as defined under FIFA eligibility rules; some limited exceptions apply. Players may hold more than one non-FIFA nationality.

No.	Pos.	Nation	Player
5	DF	ESP	Chus Herrero (from (Spain) Llagostera)
7	MF	POR	Carlitos (from APOEL)
9	FW	ESP	Airam López (from (Poland) Korona Kielce)
10	MF	ESP	Rubén Rayos (from (France) Sochaux)
11	DF	ESP	José Antonio Ríos (from (Spain) Llagostera)
15	MF	NGA	Shehu Abdullahi (from (Portugal) União da Madeira)
16	MF	CYP	Charalambos Aristotelous (from PAEEK FC)
17	DF	ESP	Iñigo Calderón (from (England) Brighton)
18	MF	USA	Louis Bennett (from (United States) Marquette Golden Eagles)
22	DF	ESP	Alberto (from (Australia) Western Sydney Wanderers)
23	MF	CYP	Giorgos Economides (from Omonia)
27	FW	ESP	Adrián Colunga (from (Spain) Mallorca)
33	DF	BRA	Guilherme Santos (from (Brazil) Sampaio Corrêa)
35	MF	CYP	Charalambos Mouzouros (from THOI Lakatamia)
44	DF	SRB	Milan Savić (from (Serbia) Novi Pazar)
91	GK	CYP	Giorgos Papadopoulos (from PAEEK FC)
97	GK	GRE	Dimitrios Katsimitros (from (Greece) Olympiacos)

Out: Note: Flags indicate national team as defined under FIFA eligibility rules; some limited exceptions apply. Players may hold more than one non-FIFA nationality.

No.	Pos.	Nation	Player
5	DF	GHA	Razak Nuhu (released)
6	MF	CYP	Christos Marangos (retired)
7	FW	ESP	Toni Calvo (to (Greece) Veria)
9	FW	RSA	Dino Ndlovu (to (Azerbaijan) Qarabağ FK)
10	MF	ARG	Nicolás Martínez (loan return to (Greece) Olympiacos)
11	MF	ESP	Andrea Orlandi (to APOEL)
15	DF	SWE	Markus Holgersson (to (Denmark) AaB Fodbold)
17	DF	GRE	Manolis Tzanakakis (loan return to (Greece) Olympiacos)
18	MF	GEO	Irakli Maisuradze (to Ermis Aradippou)
20	FW	GRE	Efthimis Koulouris (loan return to (Greece) PAOK)
22	DF	CYP	Demetris Economou (to Enosis Neon Paralimni)
23	DF	FRA	Léo Schwechlen (to (Turkey) Göztepe S.K.)
28	MF	CYP	Panayiotis Constantinou (to Enosis Neon Paralimni)
30	MF	CYP	Andreas Avraam (to (Greece) AEL)
33	FW	CYP	Andreas Makris (to (England) Walsall)
34	DF	CYP	Constantinos Laifis (to (Greece) Olympiacos)
31	GK	CYP	Andreas Kittos (to AEL Limassol)
35	DF	CYP	Panayiotis Loizides (to Omonia Aradippou)
36	DF	CYP	Adamos Andreou (released)
37	MF	CYP	Zacharias Theodorou (to Ayia Napa)
40	GK	ALB	Aldo Teqja (to (Albania) Kukësi)
91	MF	FRA	Jérémy Manzorro (loan return to (Bulgaria) Slavia Sofia)

=== APOEL ===
In: Note: Flags indicate national team as defined under FIFA eligibility rules; some limited exceptions apply. Players may hold more than one non-FIFA nationality.

No.	Pos.	Nation	Player
-	MF	CYP	Alex Konstantinou (loan return from Doxa Katokopias)
1	GK	ESP	Jordi Codina (loan return from Pafos FC)
2	DF	CYP	Kypros Christoforou (on loan from Aris Limassol)
3	DF	ESP	Roberto Lago (from (Spain) Getafe CF)
8	MF	ESP	Andrea Orlandi (from Anorthosis)
9	FW	BEL	Igor de Camargo (from (Belgium) Genk)
10	MF	ARG	Facundo Bertoglio (from (Ukraine) Dynamo Kyiv)
13	MF	POR	Carlitos (from Doxa Katokopias)
14	MF	ALB	Qazim Laçi (on loan from (Greece) Olympiacos)
70	MF	GRE	Giannis Gianniotas (on loan from (Greece) Olympiacos)
88	MF	BLR	Renan Bressan (from (Portugal) Rio Ave)

Out: Note: Flags indicate national team as defined under FIFA eligibility rules; some limited exceptions apply. Players may hold more than one non-FIFA nationality.

No.	Pos.	Nation	Player
–	DF	CYP	Christos Kallis (on loan to Alki Oroklini)
1	GK	ESP	Jordi Codina (to (Spain) Reus Deportiu)
3	DF	BRA	João Guilherme (to (Saudi Arabia) Al-Fateh)
10	MF	CYP	Constantinos Charalambides (to AEK Larnaca)
10	MF	ARG	Tomás De Vincenti (to (United Arab Emirates) Al Shabab)
13	MF	POR	Carlitos (to Anorthosis)
14	MF	CYP	Alex Konstantinou (to Nea Salamina)
15	DF	CYP	Marios Antoniades (to (Greece) Panionios)
17	MF	BIH	Semir Štilić (released)
22	DF	CYP	Paris Psaltis (on loan to Ermis Aradippou)
25	DF	CYP	Rafael Anastasiou (on loan to Anagennisi Deryneia)
33	DF	GRE	Kyriakos Aretas (on loan to Doxa Katokopias)
40	MF	CYP	Demetris Charalambous (to THOI Lakatamia)
45	MF	CYP	Georgios Christodoulou (on loan to Anagennisi Deryneia)
55	MF	POR	Estrela (to (Portugal) Varzim S.C.)
70	MF	GRE	Giannis Gianniotas (loan return to (Greece) Olympiacos, later loaned again to APOEL)
79	FW	ARG	Fernando Cavenaghi (released)
88	GK	CYP	Anastasios Kissas (to Apollon Limassol)
95	MF	CYP	Christos Djamas (to Othellos Athienou)
96	GK	CYP	Giorgos Tasouris (to Ethnikos Assia)

=== Apollon Limassol ===
In: Note: Flags indicate national team as defined under FIFA eligibility rules; some limited exceptions apply. Players may hold more than one non-FIFA nationality.

No.	Pos.	Nation	Player
6	DF	CYP	Andreas Karo (from (England) Nottingham Forest U21)
11	MF	ARG	Alejandro Barbaro (from (Uruguay) Nacional)
12	DF	BRA	Dudu Paraíba (from (Poland) Śląsk Wrocław)
16	MF	ESP	Miguel Bedoya (from (Bulgaria) Levski Sofia)
17	MF	POR	João Pedro (from (Portugal) Braga, previously on loan)
18	FW	POL	Arkadiusz Piech (from (Poland) Legia Warsaw)
21	FW	SRB	Luka Ratković (from (Serbia) Čukarički)
22	DF	FRA	Valentin Roberge (from (England) Sunderland)
30	DF	POR	Tiago Gomes (on loan from (Portugal) Braga)
46	GK	CYP	Anastasios Kissas (from APOEL)
55	DF	BRA	Paulo Vinícius (from (Portugal) Boavista)
70	GK	CYP	Michael Papastylianou (from (England) Bury)
77	FW	ESP	Adrián Sardinero (from AEL Limassol)
—	FW	ARG	Francisco Di Franco (from (Argentina) Boca Juniors)
—	DF	CIV	Mohamed Kone (from (Moldova) FC Saxan)
—	FW	BRA	Endrick (from (Brazil) Bahia)

Out: Note: Flags indicate national team as defined under FIFA eligibility rules; some limited exceptions apply. Players may hold more than one non-FIFA nationality.

No.	Pos.	Nation	Player
2	DF	BRA	Elízio (to (Portugal) Vizela)
4	DF	BRA	Freire (to (Portugal) Chaves)
9	FW	BRA	Thuram (loan return to (Brazil) Monte Azul)
11	MF	CRO	Dejan Mezga (to (Slovenia) Maribor)
14	DF	POR	Jaime (loan return to (Portugal) União da Madeira)
18	MF	BUL	Simeon Slavchev (loan return to (Portugal) Sporting CP)
22	MF	SRB	Luka Stojanović (on loan to (Belgium) Mouscron)
23	GK	ALB	Isli Hidi (to Olympiakos Nicosia)
29	FW	CYP	Georgios Kolokoudias (to Nea Salamina)
33	DF	POR	Monteiro (loan return to (Portugal) Braga B)
42	DF	CYP	Christos Wheeler (on loan to Karmiotissa)
44	GK	CYP	Panayiotis Panayiotou (on loan to Olympiakos Nicosia)
47	DF	CYP	Christos Antoniou (to AEZ Zakakiou)
49	DF	CYP	Vassilis Kyriacou (on loan to Olympiakos Nicosia)
53	FW	CYP	Theodoros Iosifides (on loan to Enosis Neon Paralimni)
—	FW	ARG	Francisco Di Franco (on loan to AEZ Zakakiou)
—	DF	CIV	Mohamed Kone (on loan to Karmiotissa)
—	FW	BRA	Endrick (on loan to AEZ Zakakiou)

=== Aris Limassol ===
In: Note: Flags indicate national team as defined under FIFA eligibility rules; some limited exceptions apply. Players may hold more than one non-FIFA nationality.

No.	Pos.	Nation	Player
16	DF	ROU	Andrei Radu (from (Romania) Dinamo București)
8	MF	CYP	Andreas Frangos (on loan from AEL Limassol)
9	FW	ALB	Vasil Shkurti (from (Greece) Xanthi)
15	DF	ESP	Alain Álvarez (from (Spain) Racing de Santander)
1	GK	BRA	Gott (from (Brazil) Coruripe)
31	GK	GRE	Nikos Giannakopoulos (on loan from (Greece) Panathinaikos)
19	FW	GHA	Sadat Bukari (from (Saudi Arabia) Al-Shoulla)
70	MF	NGA	Harmony Ikande (from (Israel) Maccabi Yavne)
5	DF	GRE	Nikos Pantidos (from (Slovakia) Dukla)
7	MF	ARG	Mariano Berriex (from (Chile) Rangers de Talca)
10	MF	BRA	Rogério Martins (from (Greece) Panthrakikos)
27	DF	POL	Tomasz Welna (from (Poland) Stomil Olsztyn)
39	GK	CYP	Simos Tsiakkas (from Omonia Aradippou)
23	FW	NGA	Ifeanyi Onyilo (from (Saudi Arabia) Al-Faisaly FC)
87	MF	SWE	Christer Youssef (from (Germany) Hansa Rostock)
93	FW	FRA	Donneil Moukanza (from (Bulgaria) Slavia Sofia)

Out: Note: Flags indicate national team as defined under FIFA eligibility rules; some limited exceptions apply. Players may hold more than one non-FIFA nationality.

No.	Pos.	Nation	Player
1	GK	CYP	George Loizou (to Ayia Napa)
4	DF	CYP	Kypros Christoforou (on loan to APOEL)
5	DF	BRA	Douglas (loan return to (Brazil) Monte Azul)
7	DF	CYP	Valentinos Pastelis (to Enosis Neon Parekklisia)
8	DF	BRA	Marco Aurélio (to AEZ Zakakiou)
12	DF	CYP	Christos Ieridis (on loan to Akritas Chlorakas)
15	GK	MKD	Edin Nuredinoski (released)
17	FW	CYP	Theodosis Kyprou (to Omonia)
18	MF	EQG	Randy (to (Greece) OFI)
19	FW	NGA	Mathew Boniface (released)
20	MF	CYP	Christos Charalabous (to Pafos FC)
25	MF	ROU	Cornel Predescu (to (Romania) Academica Clinceni)
27	MF	SVN	Ivica Guberac (to (Russia) Khimki)
28	MF	CYP	Giorgos Malekkides (on loan to Enosis Neon Parekklisia)
36	DF	MLT	Steve Borg (to (Malta) Valletta)
77	DF	CYP	Alexis Plakouas (to Alki Oroklini)
93	FW	GRE	Antonis Ranos (loan return to (Greece) Skoda Xanthi)

=== Doxa Katokopias ===
In: Note: Flags indicate national team as defined under FIFA eligibility rules; some limited exceptions apply. Players may hold more than one non-FIFA nationality.

No.	Pos.	Nation	Player
8	MF	POR	Tiago Gomes (from Nea Salamina)
9	FW	COL	Luis Arturo Peralta (from (Colombia) Once Caldas)
10	FW	ESP	Carles Coto (from Ethnikos Achna)
38	MF	CYP	Marios Poutziouris (from Ethnikos Achna)
13	DF	POR	Carlos Marques (from Pafos FC)
33	DF	ESP	Albert Serrán (from AEK Larnaca)
5	FW	POR	Rudy (from (Angola) C.R.D. Libolo)
91	FW	SEN	Bara Mamadou Ndiaye (from (Turkey) Gaziantep BB)
20	DF	GRE	Kyriakos Aretas (on loan from APOEL)

Out: Note: Flags indicate national team as defined under FIFA eligibility rules; some limited exceptions apply. Players may hold more than one non-FIFA nationality.

No.	Pos.	Nation	Player
5	DF	POR	Abel Pereira (released)
7	MF	CMR	Richard Emmanuel (released)
8	MF	ESP	Dani López (to (Romania) FC Viitorul Constanța)
9	FW	BRA	Ricardo Lobo (to (Japan) Tochigi SC)
11	MF	POR	Carlitos (to APOEL)
20	MF	ESP	Diego León (to (Qatar) Al-Mesaimeer)
31	DF	CYP	Giorgos Xenofontos (to APEP)
34	DF	BRA	Leandro (released)
36	DF	GRE	Dimitris Myrthianos (to (Greece) Panthrakikos)
77	MF	CYP	Alex Konstantinou (loan return to APOEL)
88	MF	CYP	Georgios Aresti (to Ethnikos Achna)
89	FW	ANG	Aguinaldo (to AEL Limassol)

=== Ermis Aradippou ===
In: Note: Flags indicate national team as defined under FIFA eligibility rules; some limited exceptions apply. Players may hold more than one non-FIFA nationality.

No.	Pos.	Nation	Player
26	DF	CYP	Ioannis Antoniou (from Ayia Napa)
6	DF	ESP	Alfonso Artabe (from (Belgium) Sint-Truidense V.V.)
7	FW	BRA	Ibson de Melo (from Pafos FC)
11	DF	BUL	Yordan Hristov (from (Bulgaria) PFC Botev Plovdiv)
1	GK	NED	Jordy Deckers (from (Netherlands) VVV-Venlo)
5	DF	CYP	Fotis Kezos (from Nea Salamina)
22	DF	CYP	Paris Psaltis (on loan from APOEL)
88	FW	CYP	Nicolas Alexiou (loan return from Elpida Xylofagou)
24	MF	NED	Pim Bouwman (from Enosis Neon Paralimni)
8	MF	UKR	Yaroslav Martynyuk (from (Uzbekistan) Olmaliq)
18	MF	GEO	Irakli Maisuradze (from Anorthosis)
9	FW	CUW	Elson Hooi (from (Netherlands) NAC Breda)
10	FW	ARG	Miguel Alba (from Pafos FC)
4	DF	ROU	Alexandru Benga (from (Romania) Petrolul)
19	FW	BRA	Muller Fernandes (from (Brazil) Botafogo)
29	FW	MTN	Dominique Da Silva (from (United Arab Emirates) Al Urooba)
—	FW	ZIM	Edward Mashinya (from Olympiakos Nicosia)
14	MF	BEL	Emmerik De Vriese (from Ethnikos Achna)
90	GK	CYP	Andreas Vassiliou (from Pafos FC)
89	GK	LTU	Vytautas Černiauskas (from (Romania) Dinamo București)

Out: Note: Flags indicate national team as defined under FIFA eligibility rules; some limited exceptions apply. Players may hold more than one non-FIFA nationality.

No.	Pos.	Nation	Player
4	MF	CYP	Panayiotis Frangeskou (to Alki Oroklini)
5	DF	ESP	Fran González (to (Thailand) Pattaya United F.C.)
6	MF	GAB	Ulysse Ndong (released)
11	MF	GRE	Andreas Vasilogiannis (to (Greece) Lamia)
12	GK	GRE	Leonidas Panagopoulos (released)
18	MF	URU	Christian Latorre (to (Uruguay) Liverpool)
19	FW	GUI	Alhassane Keita (to (Austria) SKN St. Pölten)
22	FW	CYP	Petros Kourou (on loan to Digenis Oroklinis)
23	FW	COD	Yannick Yenga (released)
25	FW	NED	Jessy Mayele (to (Belgium) Patro Eisden)
26	DF	CPV	Paulo Pina (to Olympiakos Nicosia)
27	MF	LBR	Theo Weeks (on loan to (Azerbaijan) Gabala)
31	GK	CYP	Athos Chrysostomou (to AEZ Zakakiou)
35	MF	POR	Diogo Rosado (released)
42	FW	GHA	Chris Dickson (to (England) Sutton United)
55	DF	CYP	Demetris Moulazimis (loan return to Omonia)

=== Ethnikos Achna ===
In: Note: Flags indicate national team as defined under FIFA eligibility rules; some limited exceptions apply. Players may hold more than one non-FIFA nationality.

No.	Pos.	Nation	Player
55	DF	CYP	Demetris Moulazimis (from Omonia)
88	MF	CYP	Georgios Aresti (from Doxa Katokopias)
25	FW	CYP	Demetris Kyprianou (from AEK Larnaca)
3	DF	BRA	Noel (from (Brazil) Americano)
11	FW	BRA	Jefinho (from (Brazil) Imperatriz)
9	FW	GEO	Nika Kacharava (on loan from (Russia) Rostov)
21	FW	GEO	Giorgi Iluridze (from (Russia) SKA-Khabarovsk Khabarovsk)
22	MF	ROU	Andrei Enescu (from (Romania) CS Municipal)
66	DF	BUL	Plamen Krachunov (from (Scotland) St Johnstone)
2	DF	BUL	Borislav Stoychev (from (Bulgaria) Cherno More)
77	MF	ROU	Bogdan Gavrilă (from (Romania) Dinamo)
28	DF	BUL	Filip Filipov (from (Bulgaria) Botev Plovdiv)
26	DF	MKD	Mite Cikarski (from (North Macedonia) Rabotnički)
7	FW	RUS	Nikolai Kipiani (from (Russia) Lokomotiv)
8	DF	GEO	Gia Grigalava (free agent)
95	DF	GEO	Patryk Procek (from (Poland) ROW Rybnik)
99	FW	ARG	Emilio Zelaya (from (Argentina) Argentinos Juniors)

Out: Note: Flags indicate national team as defined under FIFA eligibility rules; some limited exceptions apply. Players may hold more than one non-FIFA nationality.

No.	Pos.	Nation	Player
3	DF	BRA	Everton Bezerra (released)
4	DF	ROU	Alexandru Iacob (to Pafos FC)
7	FW	ESP	Carles Coto (to Doxa Katokopias)
8	MF	CYP	Marios Poutziouris (to Doxa Katokopias)
11	MF	ROU	Sebastian Cojocnean (to Enosis Neon Paralimni)
14	MF	BEL	Emmerik De Vriese (to Ermis Aradippou)
17	MF	GEO	Elguja Grigalashvili (to Othellos Athienou)
20	MF	AUT	Thomas Prager (to Enosis Neon Paralimni)
21	MF	GEO	Shota Grigalashvili (to (Kazakhstan) Irtysh)
25	DF	NGA	Ganiu Ogungbe (to Enosis Neon Paralimni)
30	MF	ENG	Krasniqi Kreshnic (to (England) Billericay Town F.C.)
31	FW	BRA	Guilherme de Paula (to (Malaysia) PDRM FA)
35	FW	CYP	Marios Elia (to AEL Limassol)
40	DF	CYP	Charis Kyriakou (to AEL Limassol)
41	DF	BRA	Samuel Araújo (released)
77	FW	GEO	Revaz Barabadze (to (Georgia (country)) FC Tskhinvali)
83	GK	MSR	Corrin Brooks-Meade (to Akritas Chlorakas)

=== Karmiotissa ===
In: Note: Flags indicate national team as defined under FIFA eligibility rules; some limited exceptions apply. Players may hold more than one non-FIFA nationality.

No.	Pos.	Nation	Player
5	MF	GRE	Giannis Taralidis (from (Greece) Kissamikos)
16	MF	SRB	Marko Adamović (from (Serbia) Voždovac)
19	GK	CYP	Charalambos Kairinos (from AEZ Zakakiou)
18	MF	VEN	Rubén Arocha (from (Venezuela) Deportivo Lara)
7	FW	CYP	Elias Vattis (from (Greece) Kissamikos)
3	DF	ARM	Taron Voskanyan (from (Armenia) Pyunik)
1	GK	MNE	Andrija Dragojević (from (Albania) Vllaznia Shkodër)
22	MF	GRE	Michaladreas Nyktaris (from (Greece) Chania)
27	FW	SVN	David Poljanec (from (Slovenia) Krško)
34	DF	GRE	Manolis Saliakas (on loan from (Greece) Olympiacos)
42	DF	CIV	Mohamed Kone (on loan from Apollon Limassol)
12	DF	CYP	Christos Wheeler (on loan from Apollon Limassol)
91	MF	ARM	David Manoyan (from (Armenia) FC Pyunik)
96	MF	GRE	Stelios Pozoglou (on loan from (Greece) PAOK FC)
97	MF	GRE	Giannis Tsolakidis (on loan from (Greece) PAOK FC)
6	MF	CYP	Panos Theodorou (from AEL Limassol)
20	MF	CYP	Andreas Stavrou (from AEL Limassol)
77	FW	CZE	Michal Ordoš (from (Czech Republic) SK Sigma Olomouc)
70	FW	GRE	Vasilis Papadopoulos (on loan from (Greece) PAOK)

Out: Note: Flags indicate national team as defined under FIFA eligibility rules; some limited exceptions apply. Players may hold more than one non-FIFA nationality.

No.	Pos.	Nation	Player
1	GK	POR	Jorge Vieira (to Anagennisi Deryneia)
6	MF	CYP	Christos Modestou (to Akritas Chlorakas)
8	MF	POR	Zé Vítor (to ENY Digenis Ypsona)
9	FW	CYP	Marios Pastellis (to Enosis Neon Parekklisia)
12	FW	NGA	David Opara (to Ethnikos Assia)
13	MF	CYP	Andreas Rousounidis (to ENY Digenis Ypsona)
16	MF	CYP	Neophytos Hadjispyrou (to Akritas Chlorakas)
18	MF	POR	Edgar Marcelino (released)
19	MF	CYP	Marios Louka (released)
21	MF	GRE	Nikolaos Soulidis (released)
70	MF	GRE	Dimitris Popovits (loan return to (Greece) PAOK FC)

=== Nea Salamina ===
In: Note: Flags indicate national team as defined under FIFA eligibility rules; some limited exceptions apply. Players may hold more than one non-FIFA nationality.

No.	Pos.	Nation	Player
5	DF	SRB	Goran Antonić (from (Serbia) Spartak Subotica)
10	MF	CYP	Dimitris Froxylias (from Enosis Neon Paralimni)
14	FW	CYP	Timotheos Pavlou (loan return from Othellos Athienou)
16	FW	NED	Nassir Maachi (from Pafos FC)
21	DF	ITA	Davide Grassi (from (Malaysia) Sarawak)
23	MF	GRE	Savvas Tsabouris (from (Greece) Kalloni)
29	FW	CYP	Georgios Kolokoudias (from Apollon Limassol)
38	MF	ARG	Matías Abelairas (from (Argentina) Independiente Rivadavia)
3	MF	BRA	Luciano Bebê (from Omonia)
33	GK	SVK	Robert Veselovsky (from (Czech Republic) Mladá)
70	MF	CYP	Alex Konstantinou (from APOEL)
27	DF	CYP	Georgios Eleftheriou (from AEL Limassol)
—	DF	CYP	Foivos Christodoulou (from (Germany) Hoffenheim U19)

Out: Note: Flags indicate national team as defined under FIFA eligibility rules; some limited exceptions apply. Players may hold more than one non-FIFA nationality.

No.	Pos.	Nation	Player
1	GK	LVA	Pāvels Šteinbors (to (Poland) Arka Gdynia)
2	DF	SRB	Marko Andić (to (Serbia) Spartak Subotica)
3	DF	CYP	Chrysanthos Mantzalos (on loan to Omonia Aradippou)
4	DF	SRB	Dragan Žarković (to (Serbia) Napredak Kruševac)
6	MF	GLP	Matthieu Bemba (to (Poland) Radomiak Radom)
10	FW	PAR	Aldo Adorno (to Othellos Athienou)
12	DF	CYP	Kyriacos Kyriacou (to Othellos Athienou)
14	FW	CYP	Timotheos Pavlou (to ASIL Lysi)
16	MF	CYP	Andreas Lemesios (on loan to Othellos Athienou)
17	FW	CYP	Stavrinos Constantinou (on loan to Othellos Athienou)
21	DF	CYP	Fotis Kezos (to Ermis Aradippou)
22	MF	POR	Tiago Gomes (to Doxa Katokopias)
23	MF	ESP	Simón Colina (released)
25	FW	BRA	Liliu (to (Malta) Gżira United)
50	DF	LBR	Solomon Grimes (released)
69	DF	CYP	Giorgos Velkov (to ASIL Lysi)
35	MF	CYP	Iasonas Ioannou (to Ayia Napa)

=== Omonia ===
In: Note: Flags indicate national team as defined under FIFA eligibility rules; some limited exceptions apply. Players may hold more than one non-FIFA nationality.

No.	Pos.	Nation	Player
–	DF	CYP	Demetris Moulazimis (loan return from Ermis Aradippou)
2	DF	BRA	Bruno Nascimento (from (Germany) 1. FC Köln)
3	DF	GRE	Aristidis Soiledis (from (Greece) AEK Athens)
5	DF	GRE	Athanasios Panteliadis (from (Greece) Asteras Tripolis)
10	MF	BRA	Cleyton (from (Turkey) Göztepe)
11	MF	ISR	Amir Agayev (from (Israel) Bnei Yehuda)
13	GK	GRE	Konstantinos Kotsaris (on loan from (Greece) Panathinaikos)
17	MF	CIV	Blati Touré (from (Spain) Recreativo de Huelva B)
18	GK	CRO	Dario Krešić (from (Germany) Bayer Leverkusen)
22	DF	GRE	Dimitris Konstantinidis (on loan from (Greece) PAOK)
24	DF	GRE	Loukas Vyntra (from (Israel) Hapoel Tel Aviv)
27	FW	ENG	Matt Derbyshire (from (England) Rotherham United)
99	FW	CYP	Theodosis Kyprou (from Aris Limassol)

Out: Note: Flags indicate national team as defined under FIFA eligibility rules; some limited exceptions apply. Players may hold more than one non-FIFA nationality.

No.	Pos.	Nation	Player
–	DF	CYP	Demetris Moulazimis (to Ethnikos Achna)
5	DF	CIV	Romaric (to (India) NorthEast United FC)
10	MF	BRA	Luciano Bebê (to Nea Salamina)
13	FW	NGA	Vincent Eze (to (Tunisia) CA Bizertin)
16	MF	POR	Cristóvão Ramos (released)
21	MF	POR	Nuno Assis (retired)
23	MF	CYP	Giorgos Economides (to Anorthosis)
24	DF	GRE	Anastasios Kantoutsis (to (Greece) Ergotelis)
27	FW	MLT	Andre Schembri (to (Portugal) Boavista)
30	FW	SVN	Andraž Kirm (to (Slovenia) Olimpija Ljubljana)
31	GK	ROU	Laurențiu Brănescu (loan return to (Italy) Juventus)
33	GK	CYP	Antonis Georgallides (to AEK Larnaca)
45	DF	EGY	Karim Hafez (loan return to (Belgium) Lierse)
53	DF	POR	Hélder Cabral (released)
65	MF	CYP	Constantinos Louvaris (released)
88	MF	BEL	Faysel Kasmi (loan return to (Belgium) Lierse)
90	DF	CRO	Ivan Runje (to (Poland) Jagiellonia Białystok)

== Cypriot Second Division ==
=== Akritas Chlorakas ===
In: Note: Flags indicate national team as defined under FIFA eligibility rules; some limited exceptions apply. Players may hold more than one non-FIFA nationality.

No.	Pos.	Nation	Player
10	MF	CYP	Neophytos Hadjispyrou (from Karmiotissa)
9	FW	GRE	Taxiarchis Thanelas (from AEZ Zakakiou)
5	DF	CYP	Nicolas Savva (from ENAD Polis Chrysochous)
7	FW	CYP	Giorgos Neophytou (from Enosis Neon Parekklisia)
81	DF	CYP	Loizos Kakoyiannis (from Enosis Neon Parekklisia)
—	GK	LVA	Igors Labuts (from (Latvia) Spartaks)
20	FW	CYP	Rafael Kourtellos (from Nikos & Sokratis Erimis)
12	DF	CYP	Christos Ieridis (on loan from Aris Limassol)
55	FW	TOG	Hugues Ayivi (from Pafos FC)
18	MF	CYP	Giorgos Sielis (free agent)
1	GK	MSR	Corrin Brooks-Meade (from Ethnikos Achna)
17	MF	CYP	Christos Modestou (from Karmiotissa)

Out: Note: Flags indicate national team as defined under FIFA eligibility rules; some limited exceptions apply. Players may hold more than one non-FIFA nationality.

No.	Pos.	Nation	Player
2	DF	CYP	Pavlos Zerpeteas (to Koloni Geroskipou)
5	DF	CYP	Christos Palates (to Peyia 2014)
10	FW	CYP	Christos Makris (to Peyia 2014)
80	GK	CYP	Theodosis Iosif (to Pafos FC)
96	MF	CYP	Christos Makri (to Peyia 2014)
97	DF	CYP	Stefanos Poullis (to ENY Digenis Ypsona)

=== Alki Oroklini ===
In: Note: Flags indicate national team as defined under FIFA eligibility rules; some limited exceptions apply. Players may hold more than one non-FIFA nationality.

No.	Pos.	Nation	Player
23	DF	CYP	Alexis Plakouas (from Aris Limassol)
8	MF	ESP	Pablo Suárez (from Olympiakos Nicosia)
92	DF	FRA	Johan Letzelter (from Othellos Athienou)
94	MF	FRA	Yoann Tribeau (from Othellos Athienou)
86	GK	GRE	Kiriakos Stratilatis (from (Greece) Kalloni)
20	FW	CYP	Andreas Papathanasiou (from AEZ Zakakiou)
14	DF	CYP	Christos Gavrielides (from Olympiakos Nicosia)
93	MF	FRA	Dylan Duventru (from (France) FC Mantes)
6	MF	CYP	Panayiotis Frangeskou (from Ermis Aradippou)
39	DF	CYP	Christos Kallis (on loan from APOEL)
5	DF	CYP	Stelios Parpas (from Enosis Neon Paralimni)

Out: Note: Flags indicate national team as defined under FIFA eligibility rules; some limited exceptions apply. Players may hold more than one non-FIFA nationality.

No.	Pos.	Nation	Player
1	GK	CYP	Leonidas Antoniou (released)
15	GK	CYP	Panayiotis Kythreotis (to Olympias Lympion)
20	MF	VEN	Héctor González (to P.O. Xylotymbou)
21	MF	CYP	Christodoulos Kountourettis (to ASIL)
77	MF	FRA	Arnaud Honoré (released)
81	FW	CYP	Giorgos Vassiliou (to Spartakos Kitiou)
99	MF	CYP	Tofallis Ttofalli (to Frenaros FC)

=== ASIL ===
In: Note: Flags indicate national team as defined under FIFA eligibility rules; some limited exceptions apply. Players may hold more than one non-FIFA nationality.

No.	Pos.	Nation	Player
7	FW	BUL	Kostadin Bashov (from Enosis Neon Paralimni)
69	DF	CYP	Giorgos Velkov (from Nea Salamina)
20	MF	CYP	Christoforos Kourtis (from AEK Larnaca)
27	MF	CYP	Paraskevas Choutris (from AEK Larnaca)
9	FW	CYP	Marcos Michael (from (Romania) FC Petrolul Ploiești)
10	MF	GRE	Giorgos Grammatikopoulos (from Digenis Akritas Morphou)
14	MF	MDA	Roman Bolbocian (from Elpida Xylofagou)
11	FW	CYP	Timotheos Pavlou (from Nea Salamina)
1	GK	CYP	Constantinos Zacharoudiou (from Digenis Ypsonas)
—	GK	CYP	Nektarios Kyriakou (from Troulloi FC)
21	FW	CYP	Markos Markou (from Othellos)
18	FW	ROU	Andrei Ionescu (from (Netherlands) FC Eindhoven)

Out: Note: Flags indicate national team as defined under FIFA eligibility rules; some limited exceptions apply. Players may hold more than one non-FIFA nationality.

No.	Pos.	Nation	Player
2	DF	ARG	Daniel Blanco (to Ormideia FC)
7	FW	CIV	Félicien Gbedinyessi (to AEZ Zakakiou)
10	FW	ALG	Hicham Chirouf (to Ormideia FC)
19	MF	CYP	Antonis Vassiliou (to Livadiakos/Salamina Livadion)
20	MF	CYP	Luka Mihajlović (to Digenis Akritas Morphou)
22	DF	CYP	Stavros Christoudias (to Digenis Akritas Morphou)
32	MF	ROU	Alexandru Ciocâlteu (to (Romania) Dunărea Călărași)

=== Ayia Napa ===
In: Note: Flags indicate national team as defined under FIFA eligibility rules; some limited exceptions apply. Players may hold more than one non-FIFA nationality.

No.	Pos.	Nation	Player
6	MF	CYP	Sergios Panayiotou (from AEZ Zakakiou)
21	DF	VEN	Andrés Rouga (from (Venezuela) Estudiantes de Mérida)
8	MF	CYP	Konstantinos Konstantinou (from Elpida Xylofagou)
11	FW	CYP	Nikos Panayides (from Digenis Akritas Ipsona)
10	MF	TUN	Mohamed Sassi (from (France) FC Mantes)
1	GK	CYP	George Loizou (from Aris Limassol)
77	MF	CYP	Andreas Alcibiades (from Othellos Athienou)
28	MF	GRE	Petros Kaminiotis (from (Greece) Chania)
99	FW	ZIM	Musa Mguni (from Olympiakos Nicosia)
23	MF	CYP	Zacharias Theodorou (from Anorthosis)
9	FW	POR	José Embaló (from (Iceland) Fjarðabyggðar)
33	DF	MKD	Bojan Markovski (from (North Macedonia) Rabotnichki)
30	FW	CYP	Andreas Christou (from AEZ Zakakiou)
15	GK	CYP	Ioannis Kasiakkis (on loan from Anagennisi Deryneia)
35	MF	CYP	Iasonas Ioannou (from Nea Salamina)

Out: Note: Flags indicate national team as defined under FIFA eligibility rules; some limited exceptions apply. Players may hold more than one non-FIFA nationality.

No.	Pos.	Nation	Player
3	DF	ENG	Michael Felgate (to Enosis Neon Paralimni)
4	DF	SRB	Nebojša Skopljak (to AEZ Zakakiou)
20	MF	CYP	Antonis Katsis (to AEZ Zakakiou)
25	MF	ENG	Alistair Slowe (to Anagennisi Deryneia)
37	DF	CYP	Eleftherios Mertakas (to Enosis Neon Paralimni)
92	DF	CYP	Elvis Kryukov (to Enosis Neon Parekklisia)
99	FW	CYP	Kristis Andreou (to AEZ Zakakiou)

=== ENAD Polis Chrysochous ===
In: Note: Flags indicate national team as defined under FIFA eligibility rules; some limited exceptions apply. Players may hold more than one non-FIFA nationality.

No.	Pos.	Nation	Player
7	FW	CYP	Grigoris Hadjivassilis (from Nikos & Sokratis Erimis)
4	DF	CYP	Christos Nicolaou (from Ethnikos Latsion FC)
93	GK	AUT	Miroslav Orlic (from (Bosnia and Herzegovina) FK Zvijezda 09)
28	MF	GRE	Spartakos Kotanidis (from Nikos & Sokratis Erimis)
19	MF	CYP	Angelos Mavrakis (from Nikos & Sokratis Erimis)
8	DF	CYP	Chrysis Antoniou (from Enosis Neon Parekklisia)
5	DF	CYP	Panayiotis Foklas (from APEP)
10	FW	CYP	Nikolas Theodorou (from (Greece) Kalamata)
—	MF	GRE	Anestis Zafiridis (from (Greece) Ionikos)
—	DF	ISL	Árni Rúnar Örvarsson (from (Faroe Islands) Tvøroyrar Bóltfelag)
18	MF	URU	Diego Denis (from (Uruguay) Villa Teresa)
44	MF	GRE	Alexandros Lavidas (from (Greece) APE Lagada)

Out: Note: Flags indicate national team as defined under FIFA eligibility rules; some limited exceptions apply. Players may hold more than one non-FIFA nationality.

No.	Pos.	Nation	Player
4	DF	GRE	Nikos Barboudis (to Anagennisi Deryneia)
5	DF	CYP	Nicolas Savva (to Akritas Chlorakas)

=== Enosis Neon Paralimni ===
In: Note: Flags indicate national team as defined under FIFA eligibility rules; some limited exceptions apply. Players may hold more than one non-FIFA nationality.

No.	Pos.	Nation	Player
—	MF	CYP	Marios Laifis (from THOI Lakatamia)
—	MF	CYP	Antonis Ioannou (loan return from Anagennisi Deryneia)
—	DF	CYP	Antonis Moushis (from Anagennisi Deryneia)
—	GK	FRA	Mathieu Valverde (from Anorthosis)
—	FW	CYP	Theodoros Iosifides (on loan from Apollon Limassol)
—	DF	CYP	Eleftherios Mertakas (from Ayia Napa)
—	MF	ROU	Sebastian Cojocnean (from Ethnikos Achna)
—	MF	AUT	Thomas Prager (from Ethnikos Achna)
—	MF	ESP	Jorge Troiteiro (from (Spain) Mérida)
—	DF	CYP	Demetris Economou (from Anorthosis)
—	DF	ENG	Michael Felgate (from Ayia Napa)
33	MF	CYP	Panayiotis Constantinou (from Anorthosis)

Out: Note: Flags indicate national team as defined under FIFA eligibility rules; some limited exceptions apply. Players may hold more than one non-FIFA nationality.

No.	Pos.	Nation	Player
3	DF	CYP	Adamos Pierettis (released)
4	MF	POR	Edson Silva (released)
5	DF	CYP	Stelios Parpas (from Alki Oroklini)
6	DF	CYP	Angelos Tsiaklis (to Olympiakos Nicosia)
7	FW	BUL	Kostadin Bashov (to ASIL Lysi)
8	MF	NED	Pim Bouwman (to Ermis Aradippou)
10	MF	MNE	Simon Vukčević (to (Portugal) G.D. Chaves)
18	FW	GRE	Vasilis Papadopoulos (loan return to (Greece) PAOK)
23	MF	SRB	Milan Svojić (released)
31	MF	SRB	Stefan Bukorac (released)
32	GK	CRO	Krševan Santini (to (Azerbaijan) Neftçi PFK)
28	DF	GRE	Vassilis Vallianos (to (Greece) OFI)
80	MF	CYP	Dimitris Froxylias (to Nea Salamina)
94	MF	BEL	Kenneth Van Ransbeeck (to (Italy) Benevento)

=== Enosis Neon Parekklisia ===
In: Note: Flags indicate national team as defined under FIFA eligibility rules; some limited exceptions apply. Players may hold more than one non-FIFA nationality.

No.	Pos.	Nation	Player
2	DF	GRE	Aristomenis Tzitzikalakis (on from (Greece) Atromitos)
8	FW	CYP	Marios Pastellis (from Karmiotissa)
9	FW	CYP	Demetris Kardanas (from APEP)
14	MF	CYP	Giorgos Malekkides (from Aris Limassol)
17	DF	CYP	Andreas Niokka (from Nikos & Sokratis Erimis)
18	GK	ROU	Victor Drenea (from THOI Lakatamia)
20	MF	CYP	Christos Nicolaou (from AEZ Zakakiou)
23	DF	CYP	Elvis Kryukov (from Ayia Napa)
77	MF	CYP	Valentinos Pastellis (from Aris Limassol)

Out: Note: Flags indicate national team as defined under FIFA eligibility rules; some limited exceptions apply. Players may hold more than one non-FIFA nationality.

No.	Pos.	Nation	Player
8	DF	CYP	Chrysis Antoniou (to ENAD Polis Chrysochous)
9	FW	CYP	Giorgos Neophytou (to Akritas Chlorakas)
15	MF	CYP	Andreas Theofanous (to APEP)
81	DF	CYP	Loizos Kakoyiannis (to Akritas Chlorakas)

=== Ethnikos Assia ===
In: Note: Flags indicate national team as defined under FIFA eligibility rules; some limited exceptions apply. Players may hold more than one non-FIFA nationality.

No.	Pos.	Nation	Player
—	MF	CYP	Eleftherios Panteli (from Iraklis Gerolakkou)
—	GK	CYP	Giorgos Tasouris (from APOEL)
26	FW	NGA	David Opara (from Karmiotissa)

Out: Note: Flags indicate national team as defined under FIFA eligibility rules; some limited exceptions apply. Players may hold more than one non-FIFA nationality.

No.	Pos.	Nation	Player

=== Olympiakos Nicosia ===
In: Note: Flags indicate national team as defined under FIFA eligibility rules; some limited exceptions apply. Players may hold more than one non-FIFA nationality.

No.	Pos.	Nation	Player
15	GK	CYP	Panayiotis Panayiotou (on loan from Apollon Limassol)
—	DF	CYP	Vassilis Kyriacou (on loan from Apollon Limassol)
8	MF	POR	Miguelito (from (Portugal) Amarante FC)
10	MF	POR	Hélder Castro (from (Portugal) C.D. Feirense)
5	DF	CYP	Angelos Tsiaklis (from Enosis Neon Paralimni)
1	GK	ALB	Isli Hidi (from Apollon Limassol)
11	MF	CYP	Marios Pechlivanis (from Austria Wien)
26	DF	POR	Paulo Pina (from Ermis Aradippou)
99	FW	GHA	Samuel Nii Noye Narh (from Achyronas Liopetriou)
7	FW	CYP	Pavlos Christodoulou (from Apoel Nicosia)
9	FW	POR	Romeu Torres ( (Bahrain) from Al Hala SC)
—	FW	GRE	Zinon Pitsiavas (from (Greece) Kozani)
17	FW	CYP	Constantinos Kouloumbris (from AC Omonia)
—	DF	CYP	Andreas Andreou (from Apollon Limassol)
44	DF	CYP	James Alexandrou (from AEZ Zakakiou)
20	FW	ALB	Ardit Prendi (from Panionios)

Out: Note: Flags indicate national team as defined under FIFA eligibility rules; some limited exceptions apply. Players may hold more than one non-FIFA nationality.

No.	Pos.	Nation	Player
8	MF	CYP	Michalis Ioannides (to THOI Lakatamia)
9	FW	CYP	Giorgos Loizou (to Chalkanoras Idaliou)
10	MF	CYP	Yiannis Pachipis (to AEZ Zakakiou)
14	DF	CYP	Christos Gavrielides (to Alki Oroklini)
18	FW	CYP	Demetris Vasiliades (to THOI Lakatamia)
31	DF	CYP	Thanasis Liasides (to THOI Lakatamia)
20	FW	ESP	Mario Martos (to Linares Deportivo)
22	MF	ESP	Pablo Daniel Suárez Barreiro (to Alki Oroklini)
23	GK	ESP	Salva (San Fernando CD)
37	FW	ZIM	Edward Mashinya (to Ermis Aradippou)
91	GK	GRE	Lefteris Chatziadamides (to THOI Lakatamia)
99	FW	ZIM	Musa Mguni (to Ayia Napa F.C.)
—	DF	CYP	Vassilis Kyriacou (loan return to Apollon Limassol)

=== Omonia Aradippou ===
In: Note: Flags indicate national team as defined under FIFA eligibility rules; some limited exceptions apply. Players may hold more than one non-FIFA nationality.

No.	Pos.	Nation	Player
—	FW	ENG	Sam Malsom (from Digenis Oroklinis)
—	FW	POR	Luisinho (from (Portugal) S.U. 1º de Dezembro)
—	FW	BUL	Georgi Kakalov (from (Turkey) Ergene Velimeşe Spor)
—	DF	GRE	Orestis Nikolopoulos (from (Greece) Fostiras)
—	MF	CYP	Tziovannis Kastanos (from Elpida Xylofagou)
—	DF	CYP	Chrysanthos Mantzalos (on loan from Nea Salamina)
—	DF	CYP	Panayiotis Loizides (from Anorthosis)
—	FW	GRE	Ilias Stavropoulos (from (Greece) Kampaniakos)

Out: Note: Flags indicate national team as defined under FIFA eligibility rules; some limited exceptions apply. Players may hold more than one non-FIFA nationality.

No.	Pos.	Nation	Player
4	DF	GRE	Angelos Eleftheriadis (released)
5	DF	CYP	Michalis Pericleous (released)
8	MF	ESP	Hector Micó (released)
9	FW	ARG	Kevin Levis (released)
10	FW	CYP	Nicolas Theodorou (released)
16	MF	CPV	Cuca Fernandes (released)
17	DF	CYP	Antonis Koudellis (released)
21	DF	ANG	Comboio (released)
23	GK	CYP	Simos Tsiakkas (to Aris Limassol)
25	DF	CYP	Constantinos Raymond Caughan (released)
77	FW	SLE	Ishmael Danjaji (released)

=== Othellos Athienou ===
In: Note: Flags indicate national team as defined under FIFA eligibility rules; some limited exceptions apply. Players may hold more than one non-FIFA nationality.

No.	Pos.	Nation	Player
10	MF	GEO	Elguja Grigalashvili (from Ethnikos Achna)
11	FW	CYP	Constantinos Anthimou (from AEK Larnaca)
12	FW	PAR	Aldo Adorno (from Nea Salamina)
—	DF	CYP	Kyriacos Kyriacou (from Nea Salamina)
15	DF	CYP	Constantinos Kastanas (from AEK Larnaca)
16	MF	CYP	Andreas Lemesios (on loan from Nea Salamina)
21	FW	CYP	Stavrinos Constantinou (on loan from Nea Salamina)
27	DF	CYP	Andreas Themistokleous (free agent)
91	MF	CYP	Christos Djamas (from APOEL)

Out: Note: Flags indicate national team as defined under FIFA eligibility rules; some limited exceptions apply. Players may hold more than one non-FIFA nationality.

No.	Pos.	Nation	Player
3	DF	CYP	Nicos Efthymiou (to Anagennisi Deryneia)
7	MF	CYP	Andreas Alcibiades (to Ayia Napa)
9	FW	CYP	Andreas Pittaras (to AEZ Zakakiou)
11	FW	CYP	Timotheos Pavlou (loan return to Nea Salamina)
15	FW	CYP	Markos Markou (to ASIL Lysi)
19	MF	POR	Rúben Brígido (to Anagennisi Deryneia)
22	FW	TUN	Ismail Sassi (to AEZ Zakakiou)
92	DF	FRA	Johan Letzelter (to Alki Oroklini)
94	MF	FRA	Yoann Tribeau (to Alki Oroklini)

=== PAEEK ===
In: Note: Flags indicate national team as defined under FIFA eligibility rules; some limited exceptions apply. Players may hold more than one non-FIFA nationality.

No.	Pos.	Nation	Player
—	MF	GRE	Christos Chatzipantelides (from THOI Lakatamia)
—	MF	GRE	Vasilios Emmanouil (from AEZ Zakakiou)
—	MF	GHA	Samad Oppong (from Anagennisi Deryneia)
—	FW	CYP	Chrysovalantis Kapartis (from THOI Lakatamias)
—	DF	GRE	Vangelis Tsiamis (from (Greece) Zakynthos)
—	GK	CYP	Michalis Varvaritis (from THOI Lakatamia)

Out: Note: Flags indicate national team as defined under FIFA eligibility rules; some limited exceptions apply. Players may hold more than one non-FIFA nationality.

No.	Pos.	Nation	Player
16	MF	CYP	Charalambos Aristotelous (to Anorthosis)
91	GK	CYP	Giorgos Papadopoulos (to Anorthosis)

=== Pafos FC ===
In: Note: Flags indicate national team as defined under FIFA eligibility rules; some limited exceptions apply. Players may hold more than one non-FIFA nationality.

No.	Pos.	Nation	Player
3	DF	CYP	Savvas Pikramenos (from AEZ Zakakiou)
—	MF	CYP	Giorgos Vasou (from Akritas Chlorakas)
—	MF	CYP	Christos Charalabous (from Aris Limassol)
—	FW	POR	Henrique Gomes (from (Portugal) Oriental)
—	MF	GNB	Leonel (from (Portugal) Oriental)
—	FW	ROU	Adrian Pătulea (from (Romania) Farul Constanţa)
—	GK	CYP	Panos Constantinou (from (Greece) Apollon Kalamarias)
—	GK	CYP	Theodosis Iosif (from Akritas Chlorakas)
—	DF	ROU	Alexandru Iacob (from Ethnikos Achna)
—	MF	POR	Manú (free agent)

Out: Note: Flags indicate national team as defined under FIFA eligibility rules; some limited exceptions apply. Players may hold more than one non-FIFA nationality.

No.	Pos.	Nation	Player
2	DF	NGA	Rasheed Alabi (to (Iran) Sanat Naft)
11	FW	ARG	Miguel Alba (to Ermis Aradippou)
13	DF	POR	Carlos Marques (to Doxa Katokopias)
16	FW	NED	Nassir Maachi (to Nea Salamina)
21	DF	CYP	Thomas Ioannou (to AEK Larnaca)
23	MF	CMR	Hervé Bodiong (loan return to (France) Tours FC)
44	MF	CRO	Jurica Grgec (to (Israel) Maccabi Sha'arayim)
46	GK	ESP	Jordi Codina (loan return to APOEL)
90	GK	CYP	Andreas Vassiliou (to Ermis Aradippou)
95	FW	BRA	Ibson de Melo (to Ermis Aradippou)
99	FW	TOG	Hugues Ayivi (to Akritas Chlorakas)

=== THOI Lakatamia ===
In: Note: Flags indicate national team as defined under FIFA eligibility rules; some limited exceptions apply. Players may hold more than one non-FIFA nationality.

No.	Pos.	Nation	Player
—	GK	SUI	Hrvoje Bukovski (on loan from (Switzerland) FC Wil 1900)
—	DF	CYP	Thanasis Liasides (from Olympiakos Nicosia)
—	DF	GRE	Angelos Zioulis (from AEL Limassol U-21)
—	MF	CYP	Alexandros Ierides (from APOEL U-21)
—	FW	CYP	Demetris Vasiliades (from Olympiakos Nicosia)
—	MF	CYP	Michalis Ioannides (from Olympiakos Nicosia)
—	GK	GRE	Lefteris Chatziadamides (from Olympiakos Nicosia)
—	FW	POR	Walter Patrick (from (Portugal) Moura)
—	MF	CYP	Demetris Charalambous (from APOEL)

Out: Note: Flags indicate national team as defined under FIFA eligibility rules; some limited exceptions apply. Players may hold more than one non-FIFA nationality.

No.	Pos.	Nation	Player
1	GK	CYP	Michalis Varvaritis (to PAEEK FC)
11	MF	GRE	Christos Chatzipantelides (to PAEEK FC)
17	MF	CYP	Marios Laifis (to Enosis Neon Paralimni)
19	FW	CYP	Chrysovalantis Kapartis (to PAEEK FC)
27	MF	CYP	Charalambos Mouzouros (to Anorthosis)
31	GK	ROU	Victor Drenea (to Enosis Neon Parekklisia)
