= 2016–17 Anorthosis Famagusta FC season =

Anorthosis Famagusta
2016–17 season
- Chairman: Charalambos Manoli
- Manager: (Spain) Antonio Puche from 18 May 2016 until 18 October 2016 (Israel) Ronny Levy from 26 October 2016
- Stadium: Antonis Papadopoulos Stadium

The 2016–17 season will be Anorthosis' 68th consecutive season in the Cypriot First Division, the top division of Cyprus football. It covers a period from 1 July 2016 to 30 May 2017.

== Season overview ==
=== Transfer activity ===
Anorthosis Famagusta commenced their summer transfer activity on 3 June, by signing Serbian football player Milan Savić from Novi Pazar for 1+2 years.

On 17 June, Anorthosis announced the signing of Spanish footballers Cristóbal Márquez Crespo from CD Toledo for 1+1 years. and Alberto Aguilar Leiva from Western Sydney Wanderers for a year.

== Players ==
| N | Pos. | Nat. | Name | Age | EU | Since | App | Goals | Ends | Transfer fee | Notes |
|---|---|---|---|---|---|---|---|---|---|---|---|
| 2 | RB | (Brazil) | Gabriel de Moura | 38 | | 2015 | 26 | 0 | 2017 | Free Transfer | |
| 4 | CM | (Portugal) | Pelé | 39 | EU | 2015 | 23 | 5 | 2017 | Free Transfer | |
| 5 | CB | (Spain) | Jesús María Herrero | 42 | EU | 2016 | 1 | 0 | 2017 | Free Transfer | |
| 6 | DM | (Cyprus) | Marios Nicolaou | 30 | EU | 2016 | 0 | 0 | 2016 | Youth system | |
| 7 | AM | (Portugal) | Carlitos | 33 | EU | 2016 | 1 | 0 | 2019 | €100,000 | |
| 8 | AM | (Spain) | Cristóbal Márquez Crespo | 42 | EU | 2016 | 0 | 0 | 2017 | Free Transfer | |
| 9 | AM | (Spain) | Airam Cabrera | 39 | EU | 2016 | 0 | 0 | 2018 | Free Transfer | |
| 10 | AM | (Spain) | Rubén Rayos | 40 | EU | 2016 | 1 | 0 | 2018 | Free Transfer | |
| 11 | LM | (Spain) | José Antonio Ríos | 36 | EU | 2016 | 1 | 0 | 2017 | Free Transfer | |
| 16 | AM | (Cyprus) | Charalambos Aristotelous | 31 | EU | 2016 | 0 | 0 | 2016 | Free Transfer | |
| 17 | RB | (Spain) | Iñigo Calderón (4th Captain) | 44 | EU | 2016 | 1 | 0 | 2018 | Free Transfer | |
| 18 | AM | (United States) | Louis Bennett | 31 | EU | 2016 | 0 | 0 | 2016 | Free Transfer | 2nd nationality: England |
| 19 | DM | (Brazil) | João Victor (Captain) | 38 | | 2015 | 27 | 3 | 2017 | Free Transfer | |
| 22 | LB | (Spain) | Alberto Aguilar Leiva | 42 | EU | 2016 | 0 | 0 | 2017 | Free Transfer | |
| 23 | CM | (Cyprus) | Giorgos Economides | 36 | EU | 2016 | 1 | 0 | 2019 | €30,000 | |
| 30 | AM | (Cyprus) | Demetris Theodorou | 29 | EU | 2016 | 0 | 0 | 2016 | Youth system | |
| 33 | LB | (Brazil) | Guilherme Santos | 38 | | 2016 | 1 | 0 | 2017 | Free Transfer | |
| 36 | RW | (Cyprus) | Stylianos Kallenos | 28 | EU | 2014 | 0 | 0 | 2019 | Youth system | |
| 38 | RW | (Cyprus) | Neofytos Kyriakou | 29 | EU | 2014 | 6 | 0 | 2018 | Free Transfer | |
| 39 | AM | (Cyprus) | Christos Hadjipaschalis | 27 | EU | 2015 | 1 | 0 | 2018 | Youth system | |
| 44 | CB | (Serbia) | Milan Savić | 32 | EU | 2016 | 0 | 0 | 2018 | Free Transfer | |
| 77 | CF | (Guinea-Bissau) | Esmaël Gonçalves | 35 | EU | 2016 (Winter) | 26 | 12 | 2019 | Free Transfer | 2nd nationality: Portugal |
| 88 | GK | (Slovenia) | Jan Koprivec (Vice-Captain) | 38 | EU | 2015 | 35 | 0 | 2017 | Free Transfer | |
| 91 | GK | (Cyprus) | Giorgos Papadopoulos | 35 | EU | 2016 | 0 | 0 | 2018 | Free Transfer | |
| | CF | (Cyprus) | Charalambos Mouzouros | 29 | EU | 2016 | 0 | 0 | 2016 | Youth system | |

- Last updated: 31 August 2016
- Source: anorthosisfc.com.cy
- Ordered by squad number.

== Transfers ==
=== In ===
| No. | Pos. | Nat. | Name | Age | EU | Moving from | Type | Transfer window | Ends | Transfer fee | Source |
|---|---|---|---|---|---|---|---|---|---|---|---|
| 5 | CB | (Spain) | Jesús María Herrero | 32 | EU | (Spain) UE Llagostera | Transfer | Summer | 2017 | Free Transfer | anorthosisfc.com.cy |
| 7 | RW | (Portugal) | Carlitos | 23 | EU | (Cyprus) APOEL | Transfer | Summer | 2019 | €100,000 | anorthosisfc.com.cy |
| 9 | CF | (Spain) | Airam López | 29 | EU | (Poland) Korona Kielce | Transfer | Summer | 2018 | Free Transfer | anorthosisfc.com.cy |
| 10 | AM | (Spain) | Rubén Rayos | 30 | EU | (France) FC Sochaux-Montbéliard | Transfer | Summer | 2018 | Free Transfer | anorthosisfc.com.cy |
| 11 | LM | (Spain) | José Antonio Ríos | 26 | EU | (Spain) UE Llagostera | Transfer | Summer | 2018 | Free Transfer | anorthosisfc.com.cy |
| 16 | CM | (Cyprus) | Charalambos Aristotelous | 21 | EU | (Cyprus) PAEEK FC | Transfer | Summer | 2019 | Free Transfer | |
| 17 | RB | (Spain) | Iñigo Calderón | 34 | EU | (England) Brighton | Transfer | Summer | 2018 | Free Transfer | anorthosisfc.com.cy |
| 18 | AM | (United States) | Louis Bennett | 21 | EU | (United States) Marquette Golden Eagles | Transfer | Summer | 2019 | Free Transfer | |
| 22 | LB | (Spain) | Alberto Aguilar Leiva | 32 | EU | (Australia) Western Sydney Wanderers | Transfer | Summer | 2017 | Free Transfer | anorthosisfc.com.cy |
| 23 | CM | (Cyprus) | Giorgos Economides | 26 | EU | (Cyprus) Omonia Nicosia | Transfer | Summer | 2019 | €30,000 | anorthosisfc.com.cy |
| 33 | LB | (Brazil) | Guilherme Santos | 28 | | (Brazil) Sampaio Corrêa | Transfer | Summer | 2017 | Free Transfer | anorthosisfc.com.cy |
| 35 | CM | (Cyprus) | Charalambos Mouzouros | 19 | EU | (Cyprus) THOI Lakatamia | Transfer | Summer | 2019 | Free Transfer | |
| 44 | CB | (Serbia) | Milan Savić | 22 | EU | (Serbia) FK Novi Pazar | Transfer | Summer | 2018 | Free Transfer | anorthosisfc.com.cy |
| 91 | GK | (Cyprus) | Giorgos Papadopoulos | 25 | EU | (Cyprus) PAEEK FC | Transfer | Summer | 2018 | Free Transfer | anorthosisfc.com.cy |

Total spending: ▼€130,000

=== Out ===
| No. | Pos. | Nat. | Name | Age | EU | Moving to | Type | Transfer window | Transfer fee | Source |
|---|---|---|---|---|---|---|---|---|---|---|
| 5 | LB | (Ghana) | Razak Nuhu | 25 | | | Released | Summer | Released | anorthosisfc.com.cy |
| 6 | CM | (Cyprus) | Christos Marangos | 33 | EU | | Retired | Summer | Retired | anorthosisfc.com.cy |
| 7 | RW | (Spain) | Toni Calvo | 29 | EU | (Greece) Veria F.C. | Transfer | Summer | Free Transfer | veriafc.gr |
| 8 | AM | (Spain) | Cristóbal Márquez Crespo | 32 | EU | (Spain) CF Fuenlabrada | Transfer | Summer | Free Transfer | cffuenlabrada.es |
| 9 | CF | (South Africa) | Dino Ndlovu | 26 | | (Azerbaijan) Qarabağ FK | Transfer | Summer | €200,000 | anorthosisfc.com.cy |
| 10 | AM | (Argentina) | Nicolás Martínez | 29 | | (Greece) Olympiacos Piraeus | Loan Return | Summer | Loan Return | |
| 11 | AM | (Spain) | Andrea Orlandi | 32 | EU | (Cyprus) APOEL Nicosia | Transfer | Summer | Contract End | apoelfc.com.cy |
| 15 | CB | (Sweden) | Markus Holgersson | 31 | EU | (Denmark) Aalborg Boldspilklub | Transfer | Summer | Contract End | aabsport.dk |
| 17 | RB | (Greece) | Manolis Tzanakakis | 24 | EU | (Greece) Olympiacos Piraeus | Transfer | Summer | Loan Return | |
| 18 | DM | (Georgia (country)) | Irakli Maisuradze | 28 | | (Cyprus) Ermis Aradippou | Transfer | Summer | Contract End | |
| 20 | CF | (Greece) | Efthimis Koulouris | 20 | EU | (Greece) PAOK | Transfer | Summer | Loan Return | |
| 22 | CB | (Cyprus) | Demetris Economou | 23 | EU | (Cyprus) Enosis Neon Paralimni | Transfer | Summer | Free Transfer | anorthosisfc.com.cy |
| 23 | CB | (France) | Léo Schwechlen | 27 | EU | (Turkey) Göztepe S.K. | Transfer | Summer | Contract End | goztepe.org.tr |
| 28 | AM | (Cyprus) | Panayiotis Constantinou | 20 | EU | | Released | Summer | Released | anorthosisfc.com.cy |
| 28 | AM | (Cyprus) | Andreas Avraam | 29 | EU | (Greece) AEL | Released | Summer | Free Transfer | anorthosisfc.com.cy |
| 33 | CF | (Cyprus) | Andreas Makris | 20 | EU | (England) Walsall | Transfer | Summer | €200,000 | anorthosisfc.com.cy |
| 34 | DM | (Cyprus) | Constantinos Laifis | 23 | EU | (Greece) Olympiacos | Transfer | Summer | €500,000 | anorthosisfc.com.cy |
| 31 | GK | (Cyprus) | Andreas Kittos | 25 | EU | (Cyprus) AEL Limassol | Transfer | Summer | Free Transfer | ael-fc.com |
| 35 | RB | (Cyprus) | Panayiotis Loizides | 35 | EU | (Cyprus) Omonia Aradippou | Transfer | Summer | Free Transfer | Omonoia Aradippou |
| 35 | AM | (Cyprus) | Adamos Andreou | 36 | EU | | Released | Summer | Released | |
| 37 | CM | (Cyprus) | Zacharias Theodorou | 23 | EU | (Cyprus) Ayia Napa | Transfer | Summer | Released | |
| 40 | CM | (Cyprus) | Aldo Teqja | 21 | EU | (Albania) FK Kukësi | Transfer | Summer | Free Transfer | Kerkida.net |
| 91 | LW | (France) | Jérémy Manzorro | 24 | EU | (Bulgaria) Slavia Sofia | Loan Return | Summer | Loan Return | |

▲ Total Income: €900,000

Extra Income:
€300,000 (Giorgi Aburjania resale to (Spain) Sevilla)
€100,000 (Dino Ndlovu appearance of (Azerbaijan) Qarabağ FK in (Europe) UEFA Europa League)

Net income: ▲€1,170,000

== Pre-season friendlies ==
| 14 July 2016 Friendly | Anorthosis Famagusta (Cyprus) | 1 – 1 | (Cyprus) Aris Limassol | Larnaca, Cyprus |
| 19:30 EET | Esmaël Gonçalves 10' | Report 1 Report 2 Report 3 | 37' Theodosis Kyprou | Stadium: Antonis Papadopoulos Stadium; Attendance: 1.000 |

| 21 July 2016 Friendly | Anorthosis Famagusta (Cyprus) | 0 – 0 | (Israel) Maccabi Sha'arayim | Opalenica, Poland |
| 19:00 EET | | Report 1 Report 2 | | Stadium: Remes Spa & Sporting center |

| 24 July 2016 Friendly | Anorthosis Famagusta (Cyprus) | 0 – 2 | (Israel) Hapoel Tel Aviv | Opalenica, Poland |
| 19:30 EET | Pelé (red card) 82' | Report 1 Report 2 Report 3 | 74' Omri Altman; 78' Omri Altman | Stadium: Remes Spa & Sporting center |

| 27 July 2016 Friendly | Anorthosis Famagusta (Cyprus) | 0 – 0 | (Poland) KS Polonia Środa | Opalenica, Poland |
| 19:30 EET | | Report 1 Report 2 | | Stadium: Remes Spa & Sporting center |

| 2 August 2016 Friendly | Anorthosis Famagusta (Cyprus) | 4 – 0 | (Cyprus) PAEEK | Larnaca, Cyprus |
| 19:00 EET | João Victor 32'; Esmaël Gonçalves 70' (pen.); Esmaël Gonçalves 76'; Stylianos Kallenos 84' | Report 1 Report 2 | | Stadium: Antonis Papadopoulos Stadium |

| 6 August 2016 Friendly | Anorthosis Famagusta (Cyprus) | 0 – 1 | (Cyprus) Ermis Aradippou FC | Larnaca, Cyprus |
| 19:00 EET | | Report 1 Report 2 | 60' Elson Hooi | Stadium: Antonis Papadopoulos Stadium |

| 13 August 2016 Friendly | Anorthosis Famagusta (Cyprus) | 0 – 0 | (Cyprus) Doxa Katokopias | Lakatamia, Nicosia, Cyprus |
| 19:30 EET | | Report 1 Report 2 | | Stadium: EN THOI Stadium |

| 19 August 2016 Friendly | Omonia Aradippou (Cyprus) | 0 – 5 | (Cyprus) Anorthosis Famagusta | Aradippou, Larnaca, Cyprus |
| 19:00 EET | | Report 1 | 30' Cristóbal Crespo; 45' Neofytos Kyriakou; 45' Rubén Rayos; 84' Rubén Rayos; 89' (pen.) Rubén Rayos | Stadium: Aradippou Municipal Stadium |

== Season 2016-17 ==
| 27 August 2016 Match Day 2 | Anorthosis (Cyprus) | 0 – 0 | (Cyprus) Nea Salamis Famagusta | Larnaca, Cyprus |
| 20:00 EET | Iñigo Calderón (yellow card) 22'; Isma (yellow card) 55'; João Victor (yellow card) 68'; Gabriel de Moura (yellow card) 84' | Report 1 Report 2 Soccerway; Highlights | (yellow card) 9' Davide Grassi; (yellow card) 68' China; (yellow card) 88' Emiliano Fusco; (yellow card) 90+1' Robert Veselovsky | Stadium: Antonis Papadopoulos Stadium; Attendance: 7.500 (7.000 Anorthosis)/(500 Nea Salamis); Referee: (Cyprus) Vasilis Demetriou; 1st ARef: (Cyprus) Michalis Sotiriou; 2nd ARef: (Cyprus) Sotiris Victoros; ERef 4th: (Cyprus) Kyriakos Chrystodoulou |

| 11 September 2016 Match Day 3 | Aris Limassol (Cyprus) | 1 – 2 | (Cyprus) Anorthosis | Limassol, Cyprus |
| 20:00 EET | M. Antoniou 5'; Maragoudakis (yellow card) 37'; Shkurtaj (yellow card) 48'; M. Antoniou (yellow card) 61'; Efstathiou (yellow card) 65'; Ikande (yellow card) 71' | Report 1 | (yellow card) 55' Rayo; 71' (pen.) Colunga; 72' Cabrera; (yellow card) 90+2' Ríos Reina | Stadium: Tsirion Stadium; Attendance: 2.500; Referee: (Cyprus) Leontios Trattou; 1st ARef: (Cyprus) Nikos Kalisperas; 2nd ARef: (Cyprus) Andreas Michaelides; ERef 4th: (Cyprus) Vasilis Demetriou |

| 17 September 2016 Match Day 4 | Anorthosis (Cyprus) | 2 – 2 | (Cyprus) AEZ Zakakiou | Larnaca, Cyprus |
| 20:00 EET | Carlitos (yellow card) 6'; Rayo 71'; Iñigo Calderón 90+2'; Gabriel de Moura (yellow card) 90+4' | Report | (yellow card) 33' Sassi; 49' Pangalos; (yellow card) 59' Mammides; (yellow card) 69' Katsis; 89' Gbedinyessi; (yellow card) 90+4' K. Andreou; (yellow card) 90+5' Chimodzi | Stadium: Antonis Papadopoulos Stadium; Referee: (Cyprus) Nicolas Neocleous; 1st ARef: (Cyprus) Marios Demetriades; 2nd ARef: (Cyprus) Marios Kalogirou; ERef 4th: (Cyprus) Andreas Orthodoxou |

| 21 September 2016 Match Day 1 | Anorthosis (Cyprus) | 0 – 0 | (Cyprus) APOEL | Larnaca, Cyprus |
| 18:00 EET | Isma (yellow card) 67'; Carlitos (yellow card) 70' | Report | (yellow card) 28' Astiz; (yellow card) 58' Lago; (yellow card) 63' Milanov | Stadium: Antonis Papadopoulos Stadium; Referee: (Cyprus) Christos Nicolaides; 1st ARef: (Cyprus) Charalambos Charalambous; 2nd ARef: (Cyprus) Charalambos Georgiou; ERef 4th: (Cyprus) Nicolas Athanasiou |

| 25 September 2016 Match Day 5 | AEK Larnaca (Cyprus) | 4 – 1 | (Cyprus) Anorthosis | Larnaca, Cyprus |
| 18:00 EET | Laban (yellow card) 6'; Tričkovski 16'; Joan Tomàs (yellow card) 32'; Murillo 38'; Boljević 69'; Larena 89' | Report | (yellow card) 6' Shehu; (yellow card) 11' (red card) Shehu; (yellow card) 70' Pelé; (yellow card) 72' Isma; (yellow card) 74' Guilherme; 77' Cabrera | Stadium: Neo GSZ Stadium; Referee: (Cyprus) Demetris Mashias; 1st ARef: (Cyprus) Ioannis Lazarou; 2nd ARef: (Cyprus) Athinodoros Ioannou; ERef 4th: (Cyprus) Avraam Tsoukkas |

| 1 October 2016 Match Day 6 | Anorthosis (Cyprus) | 0 – 0 | (Cyprus) AEL Limassol | Larnaca, Cyprus |
| 20:00 EET | Guilherme (yellow card) 34' | Report | (yellow card) 34' Mesca; (yellow card) 35' Aly Touré Savané; (yellow card) 58' Soares; (yellow card) 60' Airosa | Stadium: Antonis Papadopoulos Stadium; Referee: (Cyprus) Giorgos Nicolaou; 1st ARef: (Cyprus) Aristides Christou; 2nd ARef: (Cyprus) Pavlos Georgiou; ERef 4th: (Cyprus) Neofytos Neofytou |

| 15 October 2016 Match Day 7 | Omonoia Nicosia (Cyprus) | 2 – 0 | (Cyprus) Anorthosis | Nicosia, Cyprus |
| 18:00 EET | Sheridan 44' (pen.); Derbyshire (yellow card) 50'; Cleyton 57'; Margaça (yellow card) 62'; Katelaris (yellow card) 70' | Report | | Stadium: GSP Stadium; Referee: (Cyprus) Loucas Soteriou; 1st ARef: (Cyprus) Marios Kalogirou; 2nd ARef: (Cyprus) Kyriakos Kyriakou; ERef 4th: (Cyprus) Vasilis Demetriou |

| 1 October 2016 Match Day 8 | Anorthosis (Cyprus) | 2 – 2 | (Cyprus) Ermis Aradippou | Larnaca, Cyprus |
| 20:00 EET | Isma 22' (pen.); Cabrera 25'; Nicolaou (yellow card) 71'; Cabrera (yellow card) 90+2' | Report | (yellow card) 21' Benga; (yellow card) 27' Christofi; 72' (pen.) Alba; 90+3' Da Sylva | Stadium: Antonis Papadopoulos Stadium; Referee: (Cyprus) Vasilis Demetriou; 1st ARef: (Cyprus) Andreas P. Andreou; 2nd ARef: (Cyprus) Omiros Tziortzis; ERef 4th: (Cyprus) Nikolas Athanasiou |

| 31 October 2016 Match Day 9 | Anagennisi Deryneia (Cyprus) | 1 – 2 | (Cyprus) Anorthosis | Paralimni, Cyprus |
| 19:00 EET | Wesllem 8'; Furtado (yellow card) 36'; Brígido (yellow card) 74'; Yuspashyan (yellow card) 78' | Report 1 | 39' Pelé; (yellow card) 63' Pelé; 82' Isma | Stadium: Stadio Tasos Markou; Referee: (Cyprus) Charalambos Skapoullis; 1st ARef: (Cyprus) Stylianos Nikitas; 2nd ARef: (Cyprus) Christos E. Christou; ERef 4th: (Cyprus) Andreas M. Argyrou |

| 6 November 2016 Match Day 10 | Anorthosis (Cyprus) | 3 – 0 | (Cyprus) Doxa Katokopias | Larnaca, Cyprus |
| 16:00 EET | Isma 12'; Economides (yellow card) 37'; Chus Herrero (yellow card) 43'; Cabrera 66'; Shehu 84' | Report | (yellow card) 33' Demetriou; (yellow card) 49' Poutziouris | Stadium: Antonis Papadopoulos Stadium; Referee: (Cyprus) Christos Nicolaidis; 1st ARef: (Cyprus) Charalambos Charalambous; 2nd ARef: (Cyprus) Ioannis Lazarou; ERef 4th: (Cyprus) Ioannis Anastasiou |

== Cyprus Cup 2016-17 ==
| 26 October 2016 Round 1 | Anorthosis (Cyprus) | 2 – 1 (a.e.t) | (Cyprus) Othellos Athienou | Larnaca, Cyprus |
| 19:00 EET | Cabrera 50'; Guilherme Santos 94' | Report | 61' Christos Djamas | Stadium: Antonis Papadopoulos Stadium; Referee: (Cyprus) Kyriakos Christodoulou; 1st ARef: (Cyprus) Doros Touros; 2nd ARef: (Cyprus) Angela Kyriakou; ERef 4th: (Cyprus) Rovertos Kosta |

== Squad statistics ==
| No. | Pos. | Name | First Division | | Cyprus Cup | | Total | | Discipline | |
| No. | Pos. | Name | Apps | Goals | Apps | Goals | Apps | Goals | Yellow card | Red card |
|---|---|---|---|---|---|---|---|---|---|---|
| 1 | GK | (Cyprus) Kyriakos Panayiotou | 0 | 0 | 0 | 0 | 0 | 0 | 0 | 0 |
| 2 | RM | (Brazil) Gabriel | 10 | 0 | 0 | 0 | 0 | 0 | 2 | 0 |
| 4 | MF | (Portugal) Pele | 5+2 | 2 | 0 | 0 | 0 | 0 | 1 | 0 |
| 5 | DF | (Spain) Chus Herrero | 5 | 0 | 0 | 0 | 0 | 0 | 1 | 0 |
| 7 | ML | (Portugal) Carlitos | 5+1 | 0 | 0 | 0 | 0 | 0 | 2 | 0 |
| 9 | FW | (Spain) Cabrera | 6+3 | 4 | 0 | 0 | 0 | 0 | 1 | 0 |
| 10 | MF | (Spain) Rayo | 8+1 | 1 | 0 | 0 | 0 | 0 | 1 | 0 |
| 11 | MF | (Spain) Ríos Reina | 1+6 | 0 | 0 | 0 | 0 | 0 | 1 | 0 |
| 15 | MF | (Nigeria) Shehu | 4+2 | 1 | 0 | 0 | 0 | 0 | 0 | 1 |
| 16 | MF | (Cyprus) Charalambos Aristotelous | 0+3 | 0 | 0 | 0 | 0 | 0 | 0 | 0 |
| 17 | DF | (Spain) Iñigo Calderón | 8+2 | 1 | 0 | 0 | 0 | 0 | 1 | 0 |
| 18 | MF | (United States) Louis Bennett II | 0 | 0 | 0 | 0 | 0 | 0 | 0 | 0 |
| 19 | MF | (Spain) João Victor | 10 | 0 | 0 | 0 | 0 | 0 | 1 | 0 |
| 20 | MF | (Cyprus) Marios Nicolaou | 1+1 | 0 | 0 | 0 | 0 | 0 | 1 | 0 |
| 21 | MF | (Cyprus) Neofytos Kyriakou | 0+2 | 0 | 0 | 0 | 0 | 0 | 0 | 0 |
| 22 | DF | (Spain) Alberto | 3+1 | 0 | 0 | 0 | 0 | 0 | 0 | 0 |
| 23 | MF | (Cyprus) Giorgos Economides | 9 | 0 | 0 | 0 | 0 | 0 | 1 | 0 |
| 27 | FW | (Spain) Adrián Colunga | 5+1 | 1 | 0 | 0 | 0 | 0 | 0 | 0 |
| 33 | DF | (Brazil) Guilherme Santos | 10 | 0 | 0 | 0 | 0 | 0 | 2 | 0 |
| 36 | FW | (Cyprus) Stylianos Kallenos | 0 | 0 | 0 | 0 | 0 | 0 | 0 | 0 |
| 39 | MF | (Cyprus) Christos Hadjipaschalis | 0 | 0 | 0 | 0 | 0 | 0 | 0 | 0 |
| 44 | DM | (Serbia) Milan Savić | 0 | 0 | 0 | 0 | 0 | 0 | 0 | 0 |
| 77 | FW | (Guinea-Bissau) Isma | 10 | 3 | 0 | 0 | 0 | 0 | 3 | 0 |
| 88 | GK | (Slovenia) Jan Koprivec | 10 | 0 | 0 | 0 | 0 | 0 | 0 | 0 |
| 91 | GK | (Cyprus) Giorgos Papadopoulos | 0 | 0 | 0 | 0 | 0 | 0 | 0 | 0 |
| 97 | GK | (Greece) Demetris Katsimitros | 0 | 0 | 0 | 0 | 0 | 0 | 0 | 0 |

Statistics accurate as of 7 November 2016.
