= Stefanos Regakos =

Greek footballer

Personal information
- Date of birth: 23 October 1997 (age 29)
- Place of birth: Athens, Greece
- Height: 1.83 m (6 ft 0 in)
- Position: Striker

Youth career
- –2017: Atromitos
- 2017–2018: Lausanne-Sport

Senior career*
Years	Team	Apps	(Gls)
2018–2019	ASIL Lysi	9	(1)
2019–2020	Alki Oroklini	18	(4)

International career
2015	Greece U18	7	(2)
2014–2016	Greece U19	10	(1)
- * Club domestic league appearances and goals as of 1 March 2020

Stefanos Regakos (Greek: Στέφανος Ρεγκάκος; born 23 October 1997) is a Greek professional footballer who plays as a striker.
