= 2017–18 Albacete Balompié season =

Albacete Balompié
2017–18 season
- Manager: José Manuel Aira
- Stadium: Carlos Belmonte
- Segunda División: -
Home colours	Away colours

The 2017–18 season is the 77th season in Albacete Balompié ’s history.

== Squad ==
As of 1 September 2017

Note: Flags indicate national team as defined under FIFA eligibility rules; some limited exceptions apply. Players may hold more than one non-FIFA nationality.

No.	Pos.	Nation	Player
1	GK	CRC	Danny Carvajal
2	DF	ESP	Álvaro Arroyo
3	DF	ESP	David Morillas
4	DF	ESP	Adri Gómez
5	DF	FRA	Mickaël Gaffoor
6	MF	ESP	Rafa Gálvez
7	MF	ESP	Josan
8	MF	ESP	Dani Rodríguez
9	FW	ESP	Aridane Santana
10	FW	ESP	Quim Araújo
11	MF	ESP	José Fran
12	FW	ARG	Fabián Espíndola
13	GK	ESP	Tomeu Nadal

No.	Pos.	Nation	Player
14	MF	ESP	Néstor Susaeta
15	DF	MNE	Esteban Saveljich (on loan from Levante)
16	MF	ESP	Jon Erice
17	FW	ESP	Héctor Hernández (on loan from Atlético Madrid)
21	DF	ESP	Chus Herrero
22	DF	ESP	Carlos Delgado
23	DF	ARG	Mariano Bíttolo
24	FW	FRA	Jérémie Bela
—	DF	ESP	Nili Perdomo
—	MF	ESP	César de la Hoz (on loan from Betis)
—	MF	ESP	Pelayo
—	MF	ESP	Marc Rovirola

=== Transfers ===
- Albacete transfers, summer 2017

==== In ====
Date	Player	From	Type	Fee	Ref
29 June 2017	(Costa Rica) Danny Carvajal	(Costa Rica) Saprissa	Transfer	Free	
30 June 2017	(Honduras) Jona	(Spain) UCAM Murcia	Loan return	Free	
30 June 2017	(Spain) Manuel Miquel	(Spain) Socuéllamos	Loan return	Free	
30 June 2017	(Spain) Eneko Eizmendi	(Spain) Pontevedra	Loan return	Free	
1 July 2017	(Spain) Iván Sánchez	(Spain) Almería	Transfer	Free	
2 July 2017	(Spain) Quim Araújo	(Spain) Valencia Mestalla	Transfer	Free	
6 July 2017	(Spain) David Morillas	(Spain) UCAM Murcia	Transfer	Free	
2 August 2017	(Spain) Chus Herrero	(Cyprus) Anorthosis	Transfer	Free	
2 August 2017	(France) Jérémie Bela	(France) Dijon	Transfer	Free	
2 August 2017	(Spain) Néstor Susaeta	(Spain) Oviedo	Transfer	Free	
3 August 2017	(Spain) Jon Erice	(Spain) Oviedo	Transfer	Free	
4 August 2017	(Montenegro) Esteban Saveljich	(Spain) Levante	Loan	Free	
7 August 2017	(Argentina) Mariano Bíttolo	(Spain) Córdoba	Transfer	Free	
7 August 2017	(Argentina) Fabián Espíndola	(Mexico) Necaxa	Transfer	Free	
28 August 2017	(Spain) Pelayo	(Romania) CFR Cluj	Transfer	Free	
30 August 2017	(Spain) César de la Hoz	(Spain) Betis B	Loan	Free	
1 September 2017	(Spain) Nili Perdomo	(Spain) Barcelona B	Transfer	Free	
1 September 2017	(Spain) Héctor Hernández	(Spain) Atlético Madrid	Loan	Free	

==== Out ====
Date	Player	To	Type	Fee	Ref
30 June 2017	(Spain) Héctor Hernández	(Spain) Atlético Madrid	Loan return	Free	
1 July 2017	(Spain) Mode	TBD		Free	
2 July 2017	(Honduras) Jona	(Spain) Córdoba	Transfer	€400K	
28 July 2017	(Spain) Manuel Miquel	(Spain) Jumilla	Transfer	Free	
1 August 2017	(Spain) Fran Carnicer	(Spain) Murcia	Loan	Free	
4 August 2017	(Spain) Héctor Pizana	(Spain) Guijuelo	Loan	Free	
4 August 2017	(Spain) Iván Sánchez	(Spain) Elche	Loan	Free	
6 August 2017	(Spain) Isaac Aketxe	(Spain) Cartagena	Loan	Free	
11 August 2017	(Spain) Diego Manzano	(Spain) Guijuelo	Transfer	Free	
14 August 2017	(Spain) Cristian Galas	(Spain) Alcoyano	Loan	Free	
16 August 2017	(Spain) Sergio Molina	(Spain) Navalcarnero	Loan	Free	
28 August 2017	(Spain) Eneko Eizmendi	(Spain) UCAM Murcia	Transfer	Free	
31 August 2017	(Spain) Javi Noblejas	(Spain) Rayo Vallecano	Transfer	Free	
31 August 2017	(Spain) Eloy Gila	(Spain) Mirandés	Loan	Free	

== Competitions ==
=== Overall ===
Competition	Final position
Segunda División	-
Copa del Rey	-

=== Liga ===
==== League table ====
Pos	Team	Pld	W	D	L	GF	GA	GD	Pts	Promotion, qualification or relegation
15	Gimnàstic	42	15	7	20	44	50	−6	52 (Note: Alcorcón finished ahead of Reus and Gimnàstic on head-to-head points: Alcorcón 10 pts, Reus 5 pts, Gimnàstic 1 pt)	
16	Córdoba	42	15	6	21	57	65	−8	51	
17	Albacete	42	11	16	15	35	46	−11	49	
18	Almería	42	12	12	18	38	45	−7	48 (Note: Almería finished ahead of Cultural Leonesa on head-to head points: Cultural Leonesa 0–0 Almería, Almería 2–1 Cultural Leonesa)	
19	Cultural Leonesa (R)	42	11	15	16	54	67	−13	48	Relegation to Segunda División B

Source: La Liga
Rules for classification: 1) points; 2) head-to-head points; 3) head-to-head goal difference; 4) goal difference; 5) number of goals scored
(R) Relegated

==== Matches ====
Kickoff times are in CET. Win Draw Loss

Match	Opponent	Venue	Result
1	Granada	A	0–0
2	Córdoba	H	0–3
3	Alcorcón	A	1–0
4	Lugo	H	0–1
5	Nàstic	A	3–1
6	Oviedo	H	2–1
7	Numancia	A	5–1
8	Lorca	H	2–1
9	Osasuna	A	1–0
10	Sevilla At.	H	2–1
11	Cultural	A	0–0
12	Huesca	H	0–0
13	Rayo	A	1–1
14	Almería	H	2–0
15	Reus	A	1–1
16	Sporting	H	2–2
17	Cádiz	A	2–0
18	Valladolid	H	2–1
19	Zaragoza	H	0–0
20	Barcelona B	A	0–1
21	Tenerife	H	1–2

Match	Opponent	Venue	Result
22	Granada	H	2–1
23	Córdoba	A	1–0
24	Alcorcón	H	2–0
25	Lugo	A	1–1
26	Nàstic	H	0–1
27	Oviedo	A	0–0
28	Numancia	H	1–0
29	Lorca	A	1–2
30	Osasuna	H	0–0
31	Sevilla At.	A	1–2
32	Cultural	H	0–0
34	Rayo	H	0–1
33	Huesca	A	0–0
35	Almería	A	1–1
36	Reus	H	0–1
37	Sporting	A	2–1
38	Cádiz	H	1–1
39	Valladolid	A	3–2
40	Zaragoza	A	4–1
41	Barcelona B	H	0–0
42	Tenerife	A	1–1
