= 2016–17 Cypriot Second Division =

Cypriot Second Division
- Season: 2016–17
- Champions: Alki (1st title)
- Promoted: Alki; Pafos; Olympiakos
- Relegated: Akritas; ENAD; Parekklisia
- Matches: 182
- Goals: 501 (2.75 per match)
- Top goalscorer: Adrian Pătulea (26 goals)
- Biggest home win: Ayia Napa 8–1 Parekklisia (25 February 2017); THOI 8–1 Ethnikos (18 March 2017)
- Biggest away win: Parekklisia 0–7 Othellos (25 March 2017)
- Highest scoring: Ayia Napa 8–1 Parekklisia (25 February 2017); THOI 8–1 Ethnikos (18 March 2017)
- Longest winning run: 10 matches Alki
- Longest unbeaten run: 15 matches Alki
- Longest winless run: 12 matches Omonia Ar.
- Longest losing run: 6 matches Akritas
- All statistics correct as of 25 March 2017.

The 2016–17 Cypriot Second Division was the 62nd season of the Cypriot second-level football league. It began on 16 September 2016 and ended on 25 March 2017. Alki Oroklini won their first title.

== Team changes from 2015–16 ==
Teams promoted to 2016–17 Cypriot First Division

- Karmiotissa
- AEZ Zakakiou
- Anagennisi Deryneia

Teams relegated from 2015–16 Cypriot First Division

- Enosis Neon Paralimni
- Ayia Napa
- Pafos

Teams promoted from 2015–16 Cypriot Third Division

- Akritas Chlorakas
- Alki Oroklini
- Ethnikos Assia

Teams relegated to 2016–17 Cypriot Third Division

- Elpida Xylofagou
- Nikos & Sokratis Erimis
- Digenis Oroklinis

== Stadia and locations ==
Location of clubs in 2016–17 Cypriot Second Division

Note: Table lists clubs in alphabetical order.

Club	Location	Venue	Capacity
Akritas Chlorakas	Chloraka, Paphos	Chloraka Municipal Stadium	3,500
Alki Oroklini	Oroklini, Larnaca	Ammochostos Stadium	5,500
ASIL	Larnaca	Grigoris Afxentiou Stadium	2,000
Ayia Napa	Ayia Napa, Famagusta	Ayia Napa Municipal Stadium	2,000
EN Paralimni	Paralimni, Famagusta	Tasos Markou Stadium	5,800
EN Parekklisia	Parekklisia, Limassol	Parekklisia Community Stadium	3,000
ENAD	Polis, Paphos	Polis Chrysochous Municipal Stadium	1,300
Ethnikos	Nicosia	Makario Stadium	16,000
Olympiakos	Nicosia	Makario Stadium	16,000
Omonia Ar.	Aradippou, Larnaca	Aradippou Municipal Stadium	2,500
Othellos	Athienou, Larnaca	Othellos Athienou Stadium	5,000
PAEEK	Lakatamia, Nicosia	Keryneia-Epistrophi Stadium	2,000
Pafos	Paphos	Pafiako Stadium	9,394
THOI	Lakatamia, Nicosia	THOI Lakatamia Stadium	3,500

== League table ==
Pos	Team	Pld	W	D	L	GF	GA	GD	Pts	Qualification or relegation
1	Alki Oroklini (C, P)	26	21	3	2	60	15	+45	66	Promotion to the Cypriot First Division
2	Pafos (P)	26	17	6	3	51	24	+27	57	Promotion to the Cypriot First Division
3	Olympiakos Nicosia (P)	26	16	6	4	44	23	+21	54	Promotion to the Cypriot First Division
4	Othellos Athienou	26	15	4	7	53	33	+20	49	
5	Ayia Napa	26	13	7	6	51	29	+22	46	
6	Enosis Neon Paralimni	26	12	8	6	41	32	+9	44	
7	ENTHOI Lakatamia	26	9	6	11	32	33	−1	33	
8	ASIL Lysi	26	8	6	12	27	33	−6	30	
9	PAEEK	26	6	8	12	26	37	−11	26	
10	Omonia Aradippou	26	5	7	14	16	30	−14	22 (Note: Head-to-head record: Omonia 1–1 Ethnikos Assia, Ethnikos Assia 1–2 Omonia.)	
11	Ethnikos Assia	26	6	4	16	23	52	−29	22	
12	Akritas Chlorakas (R)	26	5	4	17	24	45	−21	19 (Note: Head-to-head record: Akritas 3–0 ENAD Polis Chrysochous, ENAD Polis Chrysochous 2–1 Akritas.)	Relegation to the Cypriot Third Division
13	ENAD Polis Chrysochous (R)	26	4	7	15	26	52	−26	19	Relegation to the Cypriot Third Division
14	Enosis Neon Parekklisia (Note: Enosis Neon Parekklisia were deducted three points.) (R)	26	4	6	16	27	64	−37	15	Relegation to the Cypriot Third Division

Source: CFA (in Greek), Soccerway
Rules for classification: 1) Points; 2) Head-to-head points; 3) Head-to-head goal difference; 4) Head-to-head goals scored; 5) Head-to-head away goals scored (only if two teams); 6) Goal difference; 7) Goals scored; 8) Play-off (only if deciding championship round, relegation round or relegation).
(C) Champions; (P) Promoted; (R) Relegated

== Results ==
Home \ Away	AKR	ALK	ASL	AYN	END	THO	PRL	PRK	ETH	OLY	OMA	OTH	PAE	PAF
Akritas Chlorakas	—	0–2	1–1	0–3	3–0	0–1	0–0	1–2	2–1	0–1	0–2	3–5	3–0	1–1
Alki Oroklini	5–1	—	2–0	2–2	5–0	3–0	3–0	5–0	1–0	0–2	3–1	4–0	2–0	2–1
ASIL Lysi	0–2	1–2	—	2–1	1–0	1–0	0–1	2–0	1–1	1–2	0–0	1–1	2–2	0–2
Ayia Napa	3–0	2–1	1–0	—	6–0	3–0	2–0	8–1	2–1	0–0	3–1	2–2	0–0	2–3
ENAD Polis Chrysochous	2–1	1–3	1–2	1–3	—	1–2	0–1	3–1	3–0	3–3	0–0	0–3	2–1	0–3
ENTHOI Lakatamia	2–0	0–1	1–2	1–3	0–0	—	2–1	2–0	8–1	0–1	1–2	0–1	1–1	0–0
Enosis Neon Paralimni	2–0	0–2	2–1	1–1	3–2	1–1	—	4–2	0–1	2–2	3–2	0–0	2–0	2–2
Enosis Neon Parekklisia	1–1	0–1	3–3	1–0	2–2	1–1	2–4	—	1–2	2–1	0–0	0–7	1–2	2–2
Ethnikos Assia	2–1	0–2	1–0	0–3	1–1	0–2	1–1	3–1	—	0–2	1–2	2–6	2–1	0–2
Olympiakos Nicosia	2–0	0–1	2–1	3–0	3–1	2–3	0–0	3–2	3–0	—	1–0	2–1	0–1	2–2
Omonia Aradippou	2–0	0–2	0–2	0–0	0–0	0–1	1–5	0–1	1–1	0–0	—	1–2	1–0	0–1
Othellos Athienou	1–0	3–3	0–2	4–0	3–2	2–1	1–3	2–0	2–0	1–3	1–0	—	2–0	1–2
PAEEK	2–3	1–1	3–1	1–1	0–0	2–2	1–2	3–1	1–0	1–2	1–0	0–1	—	2–2
Pafos	2–1	0–2	2–0	3–0	2–1	4–0	3–1	2–0	3–2	1–2	1–0	2–1	3–0	—

Source: Cyprus Football Association (in Greek)
Legend: Blue = home team win; Yellow = draw; Red = away team win.
For upcoming matches, an "a" indicates there is an article about the rivalry between the two participants.
