= 2015–16 Cypriot Cup for lower divisions =

Tournament details
- Country: Cyprus
- Dates: 18 November 2015 – 4 May 2016
- Teams: 8

Final positions
- Champions: Alki Oroklini (1st title)
- Runners-up: P.O. Xylotymbou

Tournament statistics
- Matches played: 9
- Goals scored: 20 (2.22 per match)
- Top goal scorer(s): Sergios Avraam (3 goals)

The 2015–16 Cypriot Cup for lower divisions was the 8th edition of the Cypriot Cup for lower divisions. A total of 8 clubs entered the competition. It began on 18 November 2015 with the semi-finals and concluded on 4 May 2016 with the final which was held at Dasaki Stadium. Alki Oroklini won their 1st cup trophy after beating P.O. Xylotymbou 2–1 in the final.

== Format ==
Only teams from the Cypriot Third Division and STOK Elite Division could participate. Participation was not compulsory. 8 of 30 participated that season.

The competition consisted of three rounds. In the first round each tie was played as a single leg and was held at the home ground of one of the two teams, according to the draw results. Each tie winner was qualifying to the next round. If a match was drawn, extra time was following. If extra time was drawn, there was a replay at the ground of the team who were away for the first game. If the rematch was also drawn, then extra time was following and if the match remained drawn after extra time the winner was decided by penalty shoot-out.

The next round were played in a two-legged format, each team playing a home and an away match against their opponent. The team which scored more goals on aggregate, was qualifying to the next round. If the two teams scored the same number of goals on aggregate, then the team which scored more goals away from home was advancing to the next round.

If both teams had scored the same number of home and away goals, then extra time was following after the end of the second leg match. If during the extra thirty minutes both teams had managed to score, but they had scored the same number of goals, then the team who scored the away goals was advancing to the next round (i.e. the team which was playing away). If there weren't scored any goals during extra time, the qualifying team was determined by penalty shoot-out.

The final was a single match.

== Quarter-finals ==
The quarter-finals draw took place on 2 November 2015 and the matches played on 18 November 2015.

Team 1	Score	Team 2
(C) Ethnikos Assia	1–4	Digenis Akritas Morphou (C)
(C) Alki Oroklini	2–0	Chalkanoras Idaliou (C)
(E) Peyia 2014	0–1	P.O. Xylotymbou (C)
(C) Akritas Chlorakas	1–0	Ethnikos Latsion (C)

== Semi-finals ==
The semi-finals draw took place on 1 December 2015 and the matches played on 9 December 2015 and 20 January 2016.

Team 1	Agg.	Team 2	1st leg	2nd leg
(C) P.O. Xylotymbou	4–0	Akritas Chlorakas (C)	3–0	1–0
(C) Digenis Akritas Morphou	1–3	Alki Oroklini (C)	0–1	1–2 (a.e.t.)

== Final ==
4 May 2016

Alki Oroklini	2–1	P.O. Xylotymbou
Nikolaou (o.g.); González 77'	Report	Konstantinou 70'

Dasaki Stadium, Dasaki Achnas
Attendance: 1.650
Referee: Konstantinos Fotiou

Cypriot Cup for lower divisions 2015–16 Winners
Alki Oroklini
1st Title

== Sources ==
- "Cyprus 2015/16". Rec.Sport.Soccer Statistics Foundation. 2016-09-01.
- Official website (in Greek)

== See also ==
- Cypriot Cup for lower divisions
- 2015–16 Cypriot Third Division
- 2015–16 STOK Elite Division
