= 2015–16 Cypriot Third Division =

Cypriot Third Division
- Season: 2015–16
- Champions: Akritas (3rd title)
- Promoted: Akritas; Alki; Ethnikos A.
- Relegated: Kouris; Amathus
- Matches played: 240
- Goals scored: 677 (2.82 per match)
- Top goalscorer: Dion Esajas (27 goals)

The 2015–16 Cypriot Third Division was the 45th season of the Cypriot third-level football league. Akritas Chlorakas won their 3rd title.

== Format ==
Sixteen teams participated in the 2015–16 Cypriot Third Division. All teams played against each other twice, once at their home and once away. The team with the most points at the end of the season crowned champions. The first three teams were promoted to the 2016–17 Cypriot Second Division and the last three teams were relegated to the 2016–17 STOK Elite Division. However, after the end of the season Nikos & Sokratis Erimis withdrew from the 2016–17 Cypriot Third Division, and so the 14th-placed team remained to Third Division.

=== Point system ===
Teams received three points for a win, one point for a draw and zero points for a loss.

== Changes from previous season ==
Teams promoted to 2015–16 Cypriot Second Division

- THOI Lakatamia
- ASIL Lysi
- PAEEK

Teams relegated from 2014–15 Cypriot Second Division

- APEP

Teams promoted from 2014–15 Cypriot Fourth Division

- Alki Oroklini
- P.O. Xylotymbou
- Iraklis Gerolakkou
- Olympias Lympion
- Kouris Erimis

Teams relegated to 2015-16 STOK Elite Division

- Finikas Ayias Marinas Chrysochous

== Stadia and locations ==
Locations of the 2015–16 Cypriot Third Division teams.

Club	Venue
Akritas	Chloraka Municipal Stadium
Alki Oroklini	Oroklini Municipal Stadium
Amathus	Ayios Tychonas Municipal Stadium
APEP	Kyperounda Municipal Stadium
Achyronas	Liopetri Municipal Stadium
Digenis	Makario Stadium
Ethnikos A.	Makario Stadium
Ethnikos L.	Latsia Municipal Stadium
ENY-Digenis	Stelios Chari Stadium
Iraklis Gerolakkou	Kykkos Stadium
Kouris Erimis	Erimi Municipal Stadium
MEAP	Theodorio Koinotiko
Olympias Lympion	Olympias Lympion Stadium
P.O. Xylotymbou	Xylotympou Municipal Stadium
Ormideia FC	Ormideia Municipal Stadium
Chalkanoras	Chalkanoras Stadium

== League standings ==
Pos	Team	Pld	W	D	L	GF	GA	GD	Pts	Promotion or relegation
1	Akritas Chlorakas (C, P)	30	21	4	5	72	21	+51	67 (Note: Akritas-Alki 3–0, Alki-Akritas 1–0)	Promoted to Cypriot Second Division
2	Alki Oroklini (P)	30	21	4	5	62	25	+37	67	Promoted to Cypriot Second Division
3	Ethnikos Assia (P)	30	18	3	9	64	34	+30	57	Promoted to Cypriot Second Division
4	MEAP Nisou	30	14	8	8	51	33	+18	50	
5	Achyronas Liopetriou	30	14	7	9	44	36	+8	49	
6	Chalkanoras Idaliou	30	14	5	11	44	34	+10	47	
7	P.O. Xylotymbou	30	12	8	10	36	43	−7	44	
8	Enosi Neon Ypsona-Digenis Ipsona	30	10	9	11	31	38	−7	39	
9	Olympias Lympion	30	11	5	14	38	48	−10	38 (Note: Olympias-Iraklis 1–1, Iraklis-Olympias 0–1)	
10	Iraklis Gerolakkou	30	10	8	12	39	41	−2	38	
11	Digenis Akritas Morphou	30	9	7	14	44	59	−15	34 (Note: Digenis-Ormidia FC 0–2, Ormidia FC-Digenis 2–4)	
12	Ormideia FC	30	9	7	14	37	50	−13	34	
13	Ethnikos Latsion	30	8	9	13	24	39	−15	33 (Note: Ethnikos Latsion-APEP 4–0, APEP-Etnikos Latsion 1–0)	
14	APEP	30	9	6	15	38	55	−17	33	Spared from relegation (Note: APEP were relegated at the end of the season. However, they maintained their place in the Cypriot Third Division, after replacing Nikos & Sokratis Erimis which withdrew before the start of the 2016–17 Cypriot Third Division.)
15	Kouris Erimis (R)	30	5	5	20	27	53	−26	20	Relegated to STOK Elite Division
16	Amathus Ayiou Tychona (R)	30	2	11	17	26	68	−42	17	Relegated to STOK Elite Division

Source: League standings at CFA
Rules for classification: 1) points; 2) head-to-head points; 3) head-to-head goal difference; 4) head-to-head away goals scored; 5) goal difference; 6) number of goals scored.
(C) Champions; (P) Promoted; (R) Relegated

== Results ==
Home \ Away	AKR	ALK	AMT	APP	ACH	DGN	ETS	ENL	ENY	IRK	KRS	MPN	POX	ORM	OLM	CHL
Akritas		3–0	3–1	7–1	2–0	3–1	2–0	4–0	4–0	5–1	4–0	2–1	6–1	5–0	3–0	3–1
Alki	1–0		1–0	3–0	2–1	3–0	1–1	4–0	2–1	0–0	4–3	1–1	3–0	3–2	4–0	0–1
Amathus	0–2	0–2		0–3	1–1	2–1	2–5	0–1	3–3	0–3	1–0	2–7	1–1	1–1	3–3	1–1
APEP	1–0	0–2	5–0		3–3	3–3	0–3	1–0	1–1	0–3 (Note: APEP Pitsilia – Iraklis Gerolakkou awarded 0–3. Originally 2–2.)	1–0	1–0	1–1	0–1	1–0	2–3
Achyronas	0–1	0–4	2–0	3–2		0–0	1–0	0–1	2–0	0–2	1–1	0–0	1–2	4–0	5–3	2–0
Digenis	4–1	0–5	1–1	1–1	5–3		1–2	1–1	1–0	2–3	1–2	2–2	1–3	0–2	2–1	0–2
Ethnikos Assia	1–1	0–2	4–0	2–1	0–1	3–1		3–1	4–2	3–2	5–0	2–1	4–0	0–1	0–1	1–2
Ethnikos Latsion	0–2	1–3	0–0	4–0	0–1	0–0	1–4		1–1	0–0	0–0	0–1	3–1	1–0	1–2	1–0
ENY-Digenis	0–0	2–3	0–0	0–2	1–1	0–3	1–2	1–1		1–1	1–0	2–0	1–0	1–0	2–1	1–0
Iraklis	2–0	1–0	2–2	2–1	0–1	1–2	1–4	0–0	2–3		2–0	1–1	0–0	0–1	0–1	2–1
Kouris	1–2	1–2	1–0	1–3	1–2	0–1	1–3	0–2	1–1	3–0		1–2	1–2	1–2	2–0	1–1
MEAP	3–2	3–1	1–1	3–0	1–0	6–0	2–2	0–1	0–1	1–3	3–1		4–2	1–1	2–1	2–0
POX	0–2	2–1	2–1	0–0	2–2	3–1	1–0	3–1	0–1	2–1	1–1	2–0		1–0	1–1	3–2
Ormideia FC	1–1	1–3	5–2	3–2	0–1	2–4	2–3	1–1	0–2	3–2	1–2	1–1	0–0		4–1	0–2
Olympias	0–2	0–1	2–0	4–1	1–3	3–2	1–3	2–1	1–0	1–1	4–1	0–1	1–0	1–1		2–1
Chalkanoras	0–0	1–1	5–1	2–1	1–3	1–3	1–0	4–0	2–1	3–1	1–0	0–1	2–0	4–1	0–0	

Source: Results
Legend: Blue = home team win; Yellow = draw; Red = away team win.

== See also ==
- Cypriot Third Division
- 2015–16 Cypriot First Division
- 2015–16 Cypriot Cup for lower divisions

== Sources ==
- "2015/16 Cypriot Third Division". Rec.Sport.Soccer Statistics Foundation. 2016-10-14.
- "League standings" (in Greek). Cyprus Football Association.
- "Results" (in Greek). Cyprus Football Association. Archived from the original on 2017-10-08.
- "Teams" (in Greek). Cyprus Football Association.
- "Scorers" (in Greek). Cyprus Football Association.
