= Pablo Suárez =

Spanish footballer (born 1984)

Personal information
- Full name: Pablo Daniel Suárez Barreiro
- Date of birth: 25 April 1984 (age 42)
- Place of birth: Vigo, Spain
- Height: 1.72 m (5 ft 8 in)
- Position: Left back

Youth career
- Celta

Senior career*
Years	Team	Apps	(Gls)
2002–2006	Celta B	102	(2)
2006–2007	Burgos	30	(0)
2007–2008	Benidorm	29	(1)
2008–2009	Águilas	34	(1)
2009–2010	Roquetas	30	(1)
2010–2011	Zamora	31	(0)
2011–2012	Pontevedra	?	(1)
2012–2014	Doxa	54	(3)
2014–2015	Castellón	23	(0)
2015–2016	Olympiakos Nicosia	24	(1)
2016–2017	Alki Oroklini	22	(1)
2017–2018	Karmiotissa	19	(2)
- * Club domestic league appearances and goals

Pablo Daniel Suárez Barreiro (born 25 April 1984) is a Spanish former professional footballer who played as a left back.
