= Nebojša Skopljak =

Serbian footballer

Personal information
- Date of birth: 12 May 1987 (age 39)
- Place of birth: Belgrade, SR Serbia, SFR Yugoslavia
- Height: 1.86 m (6 ft 1 in)
- Position: Defender

Youth career
- Red Star Belgrade
- Rad

Senior career*
Years	Team	Apps	(Gls)
2006–2007	Radnički Pirot	29	(0)
2007–2010	OFK Beograd	31	(0)
2010	→ Novi Pazar (loan)	13	(1)
2010–2011	Grbalj	28	(1)
2011–2012	Novi Sad	37	(1)
2013	Mornar	16	(0)
2013	Timok	4	(0)
2014	Proleter Novi Sad	24	(0)
2015	Kecskemét	13	(0)
2015–2016	Ayia Napa	16	(1)
2016–2017	AEZ Zakakiou	15	(0)
2017–2021	TSC	74	(2)
2021–2022	Proleter Novi Sad	24	(0)
Total		324	(6)

International career
2007	Serbia U21	2	(0)
- * Club domestic league appearances and goals as of 15 May 2022

Nebojša Skopljak (Serbian Cyrillic: Небојша Скопљак; born 12 May 1987) is a Serbian retired footballer who plays as a defender.
