= Kenneth Van Ransbeeck =

Belgian footballer

Personal information
- Date of birth: 6 December 1994 (age 31)
- Height: 1.82 m (6 ft 0 in)
- Position: Midfielder

Team information
- Current team: Nocerina
- Number: 23

Senior career*
Years	Team	Apps	(Gls)
2013–2014	Woluwe-Zaventem	15	(1)
2014–2015	Wolvertem Merchtem	11	(1)
2014–2016	Enosis Neon Paralimni	30	(3)
2016–2018	Catanzaro	39	(0)
2019	Rimini	10	(1)
2020	Taranto	7	(0)
2020–2021	Albalonga	29	(0)
2021	Nardò	12	(0)
2021–2022	Afragolese	17	(1)
2022–2024	Legnago	66	(7)
2024–2025	Pontedera	20	(1)
2025	Heraclea	5	(1)
2025–	Nocerina	17	(1)
- * Club domestic league appearances and goals as of 22 Juny 2026

Kenneth Van Ransbeeck (born 6 December 1994) is a Belgian footballer who plays as a midfielder for Italian Serie D club Nocerina.

== Club career ==
He made his Cypriot First Division debut for Enosis Neon Paralimni on 24 August 2015 in a game against Ayia Napa.

After not playing in the 2018–19 season, on 26 July 2019 he signed with Serie C club Rimini.

On 2 January 2020, he joined Serie D club Taranto.

On 3 July 2024, Van Ransbeeck signed with Pontedera.
