= Marios Nikolaou =

Cypriot footballer

Personal information
- Full name: Marios Nikolaou
- Date of birth: 26 July 1996 (age 30)
- Place of birth: Famagusta, Cyprus
- Position: Defender

Team information
- Current team: Ayia Napa (on loan from Anorthosis)

Youth career
- 2008–2016: Anorthosis Famagusta

Senior career*
| Years | Team | Apps | (Gls) |
| 2016– | Anorthosis Famagusta | 5 | (0) |
| 2017–2019 | → Anagennisi Deryneia (loan) | 29 | (1) |
| 2019– | → Ayia Napa (loan) | 16 | (1) |

International career
| 2016 | Cyprus U21 | 2 | (0) |
- * Club domestic league appearances and goals as of 21 May 2020

Marios Nikolaou (Greek: Μάριος Νικολάου; born 26 July 1996) is a Cypriot footballer who plays for Cypriot First Division club Ayia Napa FC on loan from Anorthosis Famagusta. He plays as a defender.

== Career ==
Ahead of the 2019–20 season, Nikolaou was loaned out to Ayia Napa FC from Anorthosis Famagusta.
