= Neofytos Kyriakou =

Cypriot footballer (born 1997)

Personal information
- Full name: Neofytos Kyriakou
- Date of birth: 29 October 1997 (age 29)
- Place of birth: Paphos, Cyprus
- Position: Attacking midfielder

Youth career
- –2014: Pafos

Senior career*
Years	Team	Apps	(Gls)
2014–2020	Anorthosis Famagusta	27	(0)
2017–2018	→ Doxa Katokopias (loan)	6	(0)

International career^{‡}
2013–	Cyprus U17	2	(0)
- * Club domestic league appearances and goals as of 10:50, 19 May 2019 (UTC) ‡ National team caps and goals as of 21:32, 23 July 2015 (UTC)

Neofytos Kyriakou (Greek: Νεόφυτος Κυριάκου; born 2 October 1997) is a Cypriot footballer who plays for the Cyprus under-17 national team as an attacking midfielder.

== Career ==
=== Anorthosis Famagusta ===
Neofytos Kyriakou made his debut for Anorthosis in a match against Doxa Katokopia.
