= Douglas Reis =

Brazilian footballer (born 1991)

Personal information
- Full name: Douglas Ozias Reis
- Date of birth: 7 May 1991 (age 35)
- Place of birth: São José do Rio Preto, Brazil
- Height: 1.90 m (6 ft 3 in)
- Position: Defender

Team information
- Current team: Onisilos Sotira 2014
- Number: 3

Senior career*
Years	Team	Apps	(Gls)
2012	Catanduvense	11	(0)
2012	Oeste	3	(0)
2013	Rio Verde GO	14	(0)
2013–2014	Aris Limassol	27	(0)
2015	Trindade	7	(0)
2015–2016	Aris Limassol	20	(2)
2016–2017	AEZ Zakakiou	16	(0)
2017	Capivariano	16	(1)
2018	Lagarto	10	(1)
2018–2020	Karmiotissa	43	(1)
2020–	Onisilos Sotira 2014	0	(0)
- * Club domestic league appearances and goals as of 20 May 2020

Douglas Ozias Reis (born 7 May 1991), known as Douglas Reis or simply Douglas, is a Brazilian footballer who plays for Onisilos Sotira 2014 as a defender.
