= Manu Miquel =

Spanish footballer

Personal information
- Full name: Manuel Miquel Serrano
- Date of birth: 23 August 1994 (age 32)
- Place of birth: Palma del Río, Spain
- Height: 1.72 m (5 ft 7 1/2 in)
- Position: Midfielder

Youth career
- Córdoba

Senior career*
| Years | Team | Apps | (Gls) |
| 2011–2013 | Córdoba B | 3 | (1) |
| 2013 | Córdoba | 2 | (0) |
| 2013–2016 | Albacete B | 40 | (8) |
| 2015–2017 | Albacete | 3 | (0) |
| 2016 | → Levante B (loan) | 2 | (1) |
| 2017 | → Socuéllamos (loan) | 9 | (0) |
| 2017–2019 | Jumilla | 39 | (2) |
| 2019–2020 | Don Benito | 22 | (1) |
| 2020–2021 | SS Reyes | 19 | (0) |
| 2021–2022 | Don Benito | 26 | (2) |
| 2022–2024 | Ciudad de Lucena | 8 | (0) |
- * Club domestic league appearances and goals as of 22 October 2023

Manuel "Manu" Miquel Serrano (born 23 August 1994) is a Spanish footballer who plays as a midfielder.

== Club career ==
Born in Palma del Río, Province of Córdoba, Andalusia, Miquel finished his formation with local Córdoba CF, making his senior debuts with the reserves in the lower leagues. On 2 June 2013 he played his first official game with the first team, starting in a 1–2 home loss against CD Mirandés in the Segunda División.

On 19 August 2013, Miquel joined Albacete Balompié of the Segunda División B. He would spend the most of his spell registered with the B-team in the Tercera División, however.

On 27 January 2016 Miquel moved to another reserve team, Atlético Levante UD also in the third tier.
