= Mateusz Taudul =

Polish footballer

Personal information
- Full name: Mateusz Taudul
- Date of birth: 12 November 1994 (age 32)
- Place of birth: Białystok, Poland
- Height: 1.85 m (6 ft 1 in)
- Position: Goalkeeper

Team information
- Current team: Wigry Suwałki
- Number: 43

Youth career
- Piast Białystok
- Jagiellonia Białystok
- 2008–2010: MSP Szamotuły
- 2011–2014: Everton

Senior career*
| Years | Team | Apps | (Gls) |
| 2011 | Miedź Legnica II | | |
| 2015 | Nadwiślan Góra | 6 | (0) |
| 2015–2017 | AEK Larnaca | 4 | (0) |
| 2016–2017 | → AEZ Zakakiou (loan) | 9 | (0) |
| 2017–2018 | AEZ Zakakiou | 26 | (0) |
| 2018–2019 | Omonia Aradippou | 15 | (0) |
| 2019–2020 | ASIL Lysi | 9 | (0) |
| 2020–2021 | AEZ Zakakiou | 7 | (0) |
| 2021 | Olimpia Zambrów | 13 | (0) |
| 2021–2022 | Alki Oroklini | 23 | (0) |
| 2022–2024 | Othellos Athienou | 54 | (0) |
| 2024– | Wigry Suwałki | 63 | (0) |
- * Club domestic league appearances and goals as of 23:30, 3 June 2026 (UTC)

Mateusz Taudul (born 12 November 1994) is a Polish professional footballer who plays as a goalkeeper for and captains III liga club Wigry Suwałki.

== Career ==
Having started in his hometown, including at Jagiellonia, he played for Everton's youth academy but refused to sign a professional contract.

He had since emigrated to Cyprus and established himself as a professional player there.

He was loaned out for a year from AÉK Larnaka to AÉ Zakakíou, after which he then signed a permanent contract with the latter in September 2017. He debuted for Omónia Aradíppou on 24 November 2018, in a 0–1 loss Second Division away match against Karmiótissa Páno Polemidión. On 23 May 2019, ASIL Lysi announced that they had signed Taudul. He left by mutual consent in April 2020 just a few days before his contract expired. He trained with the newly promoted Jagiellonia Białystok II in the summer of 2020 before he returned once more to AÉ Zakakíou In February 2021 he signed a half-year contract with Olimpia Zambrów. After his contract expired, he signed for Alkí Oróklini, debuting in a 2–3 loss against Olympiás Lybión on 11 September 2021.

On 9 July 2022, he moved to Othellos Athienou on a one-year deal. He made 28 league appearances throughout the 2022–23 campaign, which saw Othellos win the Cypriot Second Division and gain promotion to the top-tier. He penned a new one-year contract with the club on 29 July 2023. On 4 May 2024, having lost the starting spot to Panagiotis Panagiotou in March, with Othellos' relegation already confirmed and two more league games to go, Taudul terminated his contract by mutual consent.

On 25 July 2024, Taudul joined Polish fourth division returnees Wigry Suwałki.

== Honours ==
Olimpia Zambrów

- Polish Cup (Podlasie regionals): 2020–21

Othellos Athienou

- Cypriot Second Division: 2022–23

Wigry Suwałki

- Polish Cup (Podlasie regionals): 2025–26
