= Kristis Andreou =

Cypriot footballer (born 1994)

Personal information
- Full name: Kristis Andreou
- Date of birth: 12 August 1994 (age 32)
- Place of birth: Limassol, Cyprus
- Height: 1.82 m (5 ft 11 1/2 in)
- Position: Centre forward

Team information
- Current team: Aris Limassol
- Number: 14

Youth career
- AEL Limassol

Senior career*
Years	Team	Apps	(Gls)
2010–2013	AEL Limassol	6	(2)
2012–2013	→ FC Slovácko (loan)	0	(0)
2014–2015	Žalgiris Vilnius	32	(8)
2016	Ayia Napa	8	(0)
2016–2017	AEZ Zakakiou	21	(1)
2017–2019	Enosis Neon Paralimni	21	(3)
2020–	Aris Limassol	35	(7)

International career^{‡}
2012–2013	Cyprus U19	5	(1)
2012–	Cyprus U21	7	(0)
- * Club domestic league appearances and goals as of 14:41, 14 June 2020 (UTC) ‡ National team caps and goals as of 19 November 2013

Kristis Andreou (born 12 August 1994) is a Cypriot football player who plays as a centre forward for Aris Limassol.
