= Charalampos Aristotelous =

Cypriot footballer

Personal information
- Full name: Charalampos Aristotelous
- Date of birth: 26 January 1995 (age 31)
- Place of birth: Nicosia, Cyprus
- Position: Midfielder

Team information
- Current team: ASIL Lysi
- Number: 16

Youth career
- 2010–2013: PAEEK

Senior career*
Years	Team	Apps	(Gls)
2013–2016	PAEEK	74	(5)
2016–2017	Anorthosis Famagusta	0	(0)
2017–2018	Ermis Aradippou	3	(0)
2018–2022	PAEEK	20	(0)
2022–2023	AEZ Zakakiou	28	(0)
2023–	ASIL Lysi	27	(1)
- * Club domestic league appearances and goals as of 30 June 2024 ‡ National team caps and goals as of 08:40, 3 September 2016 (UTC)

Charalampos Aristotelous (Greek: Χαράλαμπος Αριστοτέλους; born 26 January 1995) is a Cypriot footballer who plays for Cypriot club ASIL Lysi as a midfielder. Aristotelous is a product of PAEEK's academy.

== Club ==
Updated 3 September 2016.

Club	Season	Championship		Cup		Europe		Other		Total	
Club	Season	Apps	Goals	Apps	Goals	Apps	Goals	Apps	Goals	Apps	Goals
PAEEK	2013–14	26	1	1	0	–		–		27	1
PAEEK	2014–15	24	1	3	0	–		–		27	1
PAEEK	2015–16	24	3	1	0	–		–		25	3
PAEEK	Total	74	5	5	0	–		–		79	5
Career total		74	5	5	0	–		–		79	5
