= Giorgos Economides =

Cypriot footballer (born 1990)

Personal information
- Full name: Giorgos Economides
- Date of birth: April 10, 1990 (age 36)
- Place of birth: Nicosia, Cyprus
- Height: 1.79 m (5 ft 10 in)
- Position: Midfielder

Youth career
- APOEL

Senior career*
Years	Team	Apps	(Gls)
2007–2011	APOEL	2	(0)
2009–2011	→ Digenis Morphou (loan)	33	(1)
2012–2013	PAEEK	13	(0)
2013–2014	Doxa Katokopias	27	(2)
2014–2016	Omonia	55	(2)
2016–2019	Anorthosis Famagusta	63	(0)
2019–2020	Olympiakos Nicosia	21	(1)
2020–2022	Doxa Katokopias	53	(1)
2022-2023	Karmiotissa Polemidion FC	19	(0)
2023-2024	Olympiakos Nicosia		

International career^{‡}
2006–2007	Cyprus U-19	1	(0)
2009–2012	Cyprus U-21	13	(0)
2014–	Cyprus	12	(0)
- * Club domestic league appearances and goals as of 3 May 2023 ‡ National team caps and goals as of 19 November 2019

Giorgos Economides (Greek: Γιώργος Οικονομίδης; born 10 April 1990) is a Cypriot footballer who played as a central midfielder for Olympiakos Nicosia and the Cyprus national team.

== Career statistics ==
=== Club ===
As of match played 19 May 2019

Club	Season	League		Cup		Europe		Total	
Club	Season	Apps	Goals	Apps	Goals	Apps	Goals	Apps	Goals
Doxa
Doxa	2013–14	27	2	7	2	–		34	4
Doxa	Total	27	2	7	2	–		34	4
Omonia
Omonia	2014–15	23	1	4	0	0	0	27	1
Omonia	2015–16	32	1	6	0	4	0	42	1
Omonia	Total	55	2	10	0	4	0	69	2
Anorthosis
Anorthosis	2016–17	28	0	6	0	–		34	0
Anorthosis	2017–18	23	0	5	0	–		28	0
Anorthosis	2018–19	11	0	2	0	1	0	14	0
Anorthosis	Total	62	0	13	0	1	0	76	0
Career total		144	4	29	2	5	0	189	6

=== International ===
As of match played 23 March 2018

Cyprus national team
Year	Apps	Goals
2014	0	0
2015	6	0
2016	0	0
2017	4	0
2018	1	0
Total	11	0

== Honours ==
APOEL

- Cypriot Cup (1): 2007–08
