= Chus Herrero =

Spanish footballer

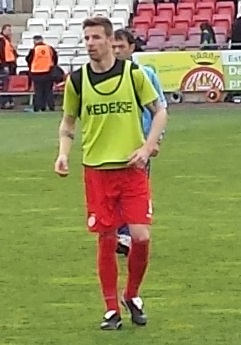
- Herreros training with Girona in 2014

Personal information
- Full name: Jesus María Herrero Gómez
- Date of birth: 10 February 1984 (age 42)
- Place of birth: Zaragoza, Spain
- Height: 1.83 m (6 ft 0 in)
- Position: Centre-back

Youth career
- Zaragoza

Senior career*
Years	Team	Apps	(Gls)
2004–2006	Zaragoza B	57	(2)
2005–2009	Zaragoza	47	(0)
2009–2012	Cartagena	77	(2)
2012–2014	Girona	40	(0)
2014–2015	Valladolid	16	(0)
2015–2016	Llagostera	26	(0)
2016–2017	Anorthosis	29	(1)
2017–2019	Albacete	32	(0)
2019–2020	Córdoba	27	(1)
2020–2022	Tarazona	52	(1)
2022–2023	Brea	32	(0)
2023–2024	Cuarte	35	(2)
Total		470	(9)
- * Club domestic league appearances and goals

Jesús María 'Chus' Herrero Gómez (born 10 February 1984) is a Spanish former professional footballer who played as a central defender.

== Club career ==
Herrero was born in Zaragoza, Aragon. A product of Real Zaragoza's youth academy, he made his debut with the first team on 27 October 2005, coming on as a 39th-minute substitute in a 1–1 home draw against Racing de Santander, but spent the vast majority of the season playing with the B side.

From 2006 to 2008, Herrero appeared in ten La Liga games each as Zaragoza were relegated in the second campaign. He contributed more significantly to help the club to return to the top flight after just one year, but would be released in July 2009, moving to FC Cartagena (recently promoted to Segunda División).

Herrero continued competing in the second tier the following years, representing Girona FC, Real Valladolid, UE Llagostera, Albacete Balompié and Córdoba CF.

== Career statistics ==
As of match played 13 March 2021

Appearances and goals by club, season and competition
Club	Season	League			National Cup		Other		Total	
Club	Season	Division	Apps	Goals	Apps	Goals	Apps	Goals	Apps	Goals
Zaragoza B	2004–05	Segunda División B	31	1	—		2 (Note: Appearances in Segunda División B play-offs)	0	33	1
Zaragoza B	2005–06	Segunda División B	26	1	—		—		26	1
Zaragoza B	Total		57	2	0	0	2	0	59	2
Zaragoza	2005–06	La Liga	5	0	0	0	—		5	0
Zaragoza	2006–07	La Liga	10	0	3	0	—		13	0
Zaragoza	2007–08	La Liga	10	0	2	0	—		12	0
Zaragoza	2008–09	Segunda División	22	0	0	0	—		22	0
Zaragoza	Total		47	0	5	0	0	0	52	0
Cartagena	2009–10	Segunda División	22	1	2	0	—		24	1
Cartagena	2010–11	Segunda División	21	0	0	0	—		21	0
Cartagena	2011–12	Segunda División	34	1	0	0	—		34	1
Cartagena	Total		77	2	2	0	0	0	79	2
Girona	2012–13	Segunda División	28	0	0	0	4 (Note: Appearances in La Liga play-offs)	0	32	0
Girona	2013–14	Segunda División	12	0	1	0	—		13	0
Girona	Total		40	0	1	0	4	0	45	0
Valladolid	2014–15	Segunda División	16	0	3	0	2	0	21	0
Llagostera	2015–16	Segunda División	26	0	1	0	—		27	0
Anorthosis	2016–17	Cypriot First Division	29	1	5	0	—		34	1
Albacete	2017–18	Segunda División	30	0	1	0	—		31	0
Albacete	2018–19	Segunda División	2	0	1	0	—		3	0
Albacete	Total		32	0	2	0	0	0	34	0
Córdoba	2018–19	Segunda División	12	1	0	0	—		12	1
Córdoba	2019–20	Segunda División B	15	0	1	0	—		16	0
Córdoba	Total		27	1	1	0	0	0	28	1
Tarazona	2020–21	Segunda División B	15	0	1	0	—		16	0
Career total			366	6	21	0	8	0	295	6
