= Alki Oroklini =

Cypriot football club

- Nickname: Αθάνατη (The Immortal)
- Founded: 1979; 47 years ago (as Omonia Oroklini)
- Dissolved: 2023
- Ground: Ammochostos Stadium, Larnaca, Cyprus
- Capacity: 5,500
- Website: www.alkiathanati.com
Home colours	Away colours

Alki Oroklini was a Cypriot professional football club based in Oroklini. The team was founded as Omonia Oroklinis in 1979. Omonia had one participation in the Fourth Division. In 2014 the team changed their name to Alki Oroklini, when business man Andy Loppas, who became the president of the team, renamed it to Alki as his favorite team was Alki Larnaca FC which was dissolved that year, due to financial problems. Alki managed the outstanding 3 promotions in 3 years from the fourth division to Cypriot first division, the highest tier in Cyprus. They withdrew from the Cypriot Second Division during the 2022–23 season.

== History ==
=== Omonia Oroklinis ===
The logo of Omonia Oroklini.

Omonia Oroklinis founded at 1979. Until 2013, the team was a member of the local association, Free Area of Famagusta Football Association (POEPA). The season 2012–13, took part to the finals of the CFA Integration Championship. They lost to Enosis Kokkinotrimithia, but they won their promotion to the 2013–14 Cypriot Fourth Division and became a member team of the Cyprus Football Association (CFA). The team able to avoid relegation. The team's colors were the green and white. Team's home ground was the Oroklini Community Stadium.

Omonia Oroklinis at CFA competitions
Season	Championship										Cup	
Season	Division	Position	Teams	Played	Won	Drawn	Lost	Goals		Points	Cup	Round
Season	Division	Position	Teams	Played	Won	Drawn	Lost	For	Against	Points	Cup	Round
2013–14	D	11	15	28	10	4	14	35	46	34	Lower Division Cup	Did not participated

=== Rename to Alki Oroklini ===
On 10 April 2014, the team's board of directors decided to rename the team to Alki Oroklini, when business man Andy Loppas, who became the president of the team, renamed it to Alki as his favorite team was Alki Larnaca FC which was dissolved that year, due to financial problems. The new president had a goal to promote the team to the Cypriot First Division. Alki Oroklini has no connection to Alki Larnaca, as the two teams never merged.

Alki Oroklini adopted the colors of Alki Larnaca (Blue and Red). The emblem of the team is similar to Alki Larnaca emblem. Furthermore, the nickname "Immortals" that was used as a nickname for Alki Larnaca is now being used for Alki Oroklini.

In the 2014–15 Cypriot Fourth Division season, Alki won the championship and promoted to the Cypriot Third Division. The next season, Alki took the second place of the league and was promoted to the Cypriot Second Division (they earned the same points with the champions team but they lost due to head-to-head records). Furthermore, they won the 2015–16 Cypriot Cup for lower divisions. At their first participation in the Second Division, the season 2016–17 Cypriot Second Division, the team won their promotion to the Cypriot First Division for the first time in their history, five rounds before the end of the championship. A few rounds later, they won the championship.

Alki Oroklini at CFA competitions
Season	Championship										Cup	
Season	Division	Position	Teams	Played	Won	Drawn	Lost	Goals		Points	Cup	Round
Season	Division	Position	Teams	Played	Won	Drawn	Lost	For	Against	Points	Cup	Round
2014–15	D	1	14	26	20	3	3	64	17	63	Lower Division Cup	Quarterfinals
2015–16	C	2	16	30	21	4	5	62	25	67	Lower Division Cup	Winner
2016–17	B	1	14	26	21	3	2	60	15	66	Cypriot Cup	A' round
2017–18	Α	11	14	36	11	6	19	48	73	39	Cypriot Cup	A' round
Points: Won=3 points, Drawn=1 point, Lost=0 points

== Home ground ==
Omonia Oroklinis home ground was the Oroklini Community Stadium. Alki Oroklini used that stadium for the first two seasons of their existence under that name. After they were promoted to the second division, they are using the Ammochostos Stadium.

== Players ==
As of 10 January 2022

Note: Flags indicate national team as defined under FIFA eligibility rules; some limited exceptions apply. Players may hold more than one non-FIFA nationality.

No.	Pos.	Nation	Player
1	GK	CYP	Giorgos Panayi
2	MF	CYP	Costas Charalambous (Captain)
5	MF	CYP	Iakovos Kaiserlides
6	DF	CYP	Sotiris Finiris
7	MF	CYP	Leandros Lillis (Vice-captain)
8	MF	ALB	Enea Kotrri
9	FW	CYP	Sergios Avraam
11	FW	GRE	Christos Efstathiou
14	DF	BRA	Anderson
15	DF	CYP	Constantinos Kastanas
19	FW	CYP	Marcos Michael

No.	Pos.	Nation	Player
20	MF	VEN	Rafael Acosta
21	DF	CYP	Chrysostomos Filippou
24	DF	CYP	Panayiotis Loizides
33	DF	CYP	Alexandros Theocharous
34	GK	CYP	Gregoris Ioakeim
35	FW	CYP	Gregorios Mouchli
43	GK	POL	Mateusz Taudul
55	MF	ARG	Esteban Sachetti
70	FW	CYP	Nicolas Theodorou
77	FW	CYP	Neofytos Raounas
88	MF	CYP	Sotiris Fiakas
—	FW	CRO	Vilim Posinković

For recent transfers, see List of Cypriot football transfers summer 2021.

=== Technical and medical staff ===
Position	Staff
Sporting Director	Panos Ziakas
Team manager	(Cyprus) Theodoros Theodorou
Head coach	(Bosnia and Herzegovina) Nedim Tutić
Assistant coach	(Cyprus) Stefanos Voskaridis
Goalkeeper coach	(Serbia) Jovan Savic
Fitness coach	(Cyprus) Christos Michael
Medical staff
Physiotherapist	(Cyprus) Kyriakos Andreou
Caregiver	(Cyprus) Panagiotis Hadjipanteli

== Honours ==
- Cypriot Second Division

Champions (1): 2016–17

- Cypriot Fourth Division

Champions (1): 2014–15

- Cypriot Cup for lower divisions

Winners (1): 2015–16

== External reference ==
- Omonia Oroklinis at Cyprus Football Association website (in Greek)
- Alki Oroklini at Cyprus Football Association website (in Greek)
- Alki Oroklini on Facebook
