= 2013–14 APOEL FC season =

APOEL
2013–14 season
- Chairman: Phivos Erotokritou (Until 4 December 2013); Prodromos Petrides (From 4 December 2013)
- Manager: Paulo Sérgio (Until 4 October 2013); Georgios Donis (From 11 October 2013)
- Stadium: GSP Stadium
- Cypriot First Division: 1st
- Cypriot Cup: Winners
- LTV Super Cup: Winners
- UEFA Champions League: Third qualifying round
- UEFA Europa League: Group stage
- Top goalscorer: League: Gustavo Manduca (13); All: Gustavo Manduca (16)
- Highest home attendance: 18,959 vs Zulte Waregem (29 August 2013 – UEFA Europa League)
- Lowest home attendance: 3,246 vs Alki Larnaca (19 February 2014 – Cypriot Cup)
- Average home league attendance: 8,520 (all competitions)
Home colours	Away colours	Third colours

The 2013–14 season was APOEL's 74th season in the Cypriot First Division and 86th year in existence as a football club. APOEL completed a historical domestic treble during the 2013–14 season, winning all the titles in Cyprus, the League, the Cup and the Super Cup.

== Season review ==
=== Head coach and chairman changes during season ===
On 4 October 2013, a day after the home defeat to Eintracht Frankfurt in the group stage of the UEFA Europa League, the club announced the termination of Paulo Sérgio's contract, due to a disappointing run of results domestically and abroad. Paulo Sérgio was replaced by Greek coach Georgios Donis, who on 11 October 2013 signed a contract until the end of the 2013–14 season.

Phivos Erotokritou, the chairman of APOEL since November 2008, resigned and on 4 December 2013 he was replaced by Prodromos Petrides, who had served again as chairman of APOEL from 2001 to 2006.

=== Pre-season and friendlies ===
The first training session for the season took place on 21 June 2013 at APOEL's training centre. On 6 July 2013, the team flew to Obertraun in Austria to perform the main stage of their pre-season training and returned to Cyprus on 20 July 2013. During the pre-season training stage in Austria, APOEL played six friendly matches against FK Baumit Jablonec (1–2 loss), SC Paderborn 07 (0–2 loss), FC Zbrojovka Brno (1–1 draw), FC Slovácko (2–2 draw), PAOK (0–1 loss) and TSG 1899 Hoffenheim (0–3 loss). After its return to Cyprus, the team played one more friendly match against Doxa Katokopias at GSP Stadium on 23 July 2013, in a match which APOEL won by 2–1.

=== LTV Super Cup ===
On 17 August 2013, APOEL beat Apollon Limassol 1–0 at GSP Stadium to lift Cypriot Super Cup. Paulo Sérgio's men picked up their first silverware of the season thanks to a 35th-minute goal from Portuguese defender Mário Sérgio.

=== Cypriot First Division ===
==== Regular season ====
On 2 September 2013, APOEL opened their competitive season with a 3–0 win at GSP Stadium against Enosis Neon Paralimni. Vinícius opened the scoring in the 58th minute, while Constantinos Charalambides and João Guilherme scored two late goals, both from direct free kicks. On 14 September 2013, APOEL suffered its first league defeat after losing 1–2 at AEL Limassol. Edwin Ouon and Orlando Sá scored two first half goals for AEL and APOEL scored in the 57th minute, when Diego Gaúcho put the ball into his own net after a cross from Esmaël Gonçalves. On 23 September 2013, APOEL drew 1–1 at home against AEK Larnaca. Nestoras Mitidis put the visitors in front in the 39th minute and Efstathios Aloneftis scored the equaliser for APOEL with a stunning solo effort in the 56th minute. On 28 September 2013, APOEL beat Nea Salamina by 1–0 at Ammochostos Stadium, with Mário Sérgio netting the game's only goal in the 45th minute, after trying a weak shot from the right side of the box that tricked Salamina's goalkeeper Srđan Blažić. On 7 October 2013, APOEL won Aris Limassol 1–0 at home under caretaker coach Yiannos Ioannou, with Nuno Morais scoring the only goal of the match in the 13th minute. On 19 October 2013, APOEL lost 0–2 against Ermis Aradippou at Ammochostos Stadium, in Georgios Donis debut as APOEL coach. Henrique scored the first goal for Ermis in the 81st minute by illegally using his right hand and the same player made it 2–0 from a penalty kick in the injury time. On 28 October 2013, APOEL earned three valuable points after beating Anorthosis 1–0 at GSP Stadium, thanks to a 52nd-minute goal by João Guilherme. On 2 November 2013, APOEL's disappointing run continued as the champions were defeated 0–2 by Apollon Limassol at Tsirion Stadium, thanks to Fotios Papoulis and Marcos Gullón second half goals. After this defeat APOEL dropped to the 6th place, eight points behind leaders Apollon Limassol. On 11 November 2013, APOEL easily beat last-placed Alki Larnaca 3–0 at home behind closed doors, with two goals from Mario Budimir and an own goal from Alki's player Constantinos Laifis. On 23 November 2013, APOEL drew 1–1 with Doxa Katokopias at Makario Stadium. Ricardo Fernandes put Doxa ahead after 41 minutes and Gustavo Manduca equalised for APOEL with a penalty in the 67th minute. On 2 December 2013, APOEL recorded their biggest win (by that time) in the season, beating AEK Kouklia 5–0 at home. Esmaël Gonçalves scored a hat-trick, while Gustavo Manduca and Constantinos Charalambides added a goal apiece in APOEL's victory. On 2 December 2013, APOEL beat Ethnikos Achna 2–0 at Dasaki Stadium, thanks to a goal from the penalty spot by Gustavo Manduca and a late goal from Cillian Sheridan. On 16 December 2013, APOEL beat Omonia 2–0 in Nicosia's derby and climbed up to fourth place. Gustavo Manduca opened the proceedings nine minutes after the interval with his fourth goal of the season, while Nuno Morais set up the final score 15 minutes from time after an individual effort. After this match APOEL were fourth with 26 points, only four points behind the leaders duo AEL and Apollon. On 22 December 2013, APOEL sealed their fourth consecutive league win by beating Enosis Neon Paralimni 3–0 at Tasos Markou Stadium. Efstathios Aloneftis got APOEL on the board just four minutes into the match and Marcelo Oliveira scored another one early in the second half, while Vinícius made it 0–3, in APOEL's final match of the year 2013. On 4 January 2014, APOEL drew 2–2 at home against AEL Limassol and remained four points five points off the top. Monteiro opened the scoring for AEL after only six minutes, but Efstathios Aloneftis and Gustavo Manduca struck twice in the space of three minutes to give APOEL the lead, before Orlando Sá equalise for AEL in the 34th minute. On 11 January 2014, APOEL drew their second league game in a row as they were held 1–1 by AEK Larnaca at GSZ Stadium and dropped to the 4th place, six points behind leaders AEL Limassol. Joan Tomás scored from the rebound after his penalty was saved by Urko Pardo in the 29th minute and two minutes later Constantinos Charalambides equalised for APOEL with a close-range effort, after Mário Sérgio's pass. On 19 January 2014, APOEL beat Nea Salamina 3–1 at home, in a match which was played behind closed doors. Gustavo Manduca opened the scoring with a direct free kick in the 29th minute and six minutes later César Santin scored his first official goal for APOEL to make it 2–0. Selim Benachour scored again for APOEL three minutes after the interval, while Hélio Roque just pulled one goal back for Nea Salamina in the 63rd minute. On 25 January 2014, APOEL came back from one down to beat Aris Limassol 3–1 at Tsirion Stadium. Mihai Dina gave Aris Limassol the lead in the 21st minute, but APOEL turned the match with a goal from Gustavo Manduca in the 43rd minute and an own goal from Maximiliano Oliva one minute later, before Vinícius score a third goal for APOEL in the 73rd minute. On 1 February 2014, APOEL ended Ermis Aradippou's 17-match unbeaten run with 3–0 win at GSP Stadium. Efstathios Aloneftis opened the scoring in the 35th minute and Tomás De Vincenti scored his first two official goals for APOEL in the 55th and 60th minute to make the final score 3–0. On 5 February 2014, APOEL continued their impressive form with a well deserved 2–1 win over Anorthosis at Antonis Papadopoulos Stadium and coupled with the unexpected draw of leaders AEL Limassol closed the gap at the top to four points. Tomás De Vincenti gave APOEL the lead in the 18th minute from the penalty spot and Roberto Colautti managed to equalise for Anorthosis in the 76th minute, but five minutes later Cillian Sheridan scored from close range to give his team an important win. On 9 February 2014, APOEL achieved an important 2–1 victory over Apollon Limassol at home and climbed up to second place. Gastón Sangoy gave Apollon the lead after just 11 minutes, but Tomás De Vincenti struck twice in the second half, first with a penalty in the 67th minute and seven minutes with an amazing shot from an incredibly difficult angle. On 15 February 2014, APOEL achieved an easy 3–1 win over last-placed Alki Larnaca at GSZ Stadium. Nuno Morais put APOEL ahead after 20 minutes, while Kaká and César Santin scored in the second half to make it 3–0, before Demetris Kyprianou score Alki's only goal five minutes before the end. On 22 February 2014, APOEL trashed Doxa Katokopias 5–1 at home and closed the gap at the top to one point only. Efstathios Aloneftis notched a hat-trick and Brazilian forward Gustavo Manduca scored the other two, while Doxa's consolation goal came from a powerful 40-yard shot from Nilson Antonio. On 9 March 2014, APOEL continued their impressive form with a 6–1 thrashing of AEK Kouklia at Pafiako Stadium. Within 25 minutes the game was all but over as a brace from Tomás De Vincenti, a Gustavo Manduca penalty and a red card for AEK Kouklia's Pantelis Pitsillos gave APOEL a 3–0 lead. AEK Kouklia managed to reduce the deficit through Alexandros Garpozis before the break but APOEL proved too strong as Nektarios Alexandrou and substitute César Santin with a couple completed the rout. On 15 March 2014, APOEL extended their winning streak to nine games with a 2–0 win over Ethnikos Achna at GSP Stadium. Gustavo Manduca opened the scoring with a direct free kick in the 17th minute and nine minutes later César Santin scored from close range after Nektarios Alexandrou's cross to make it 2–0 for APOEL. On 19 March 2014, APOEL were held to a goalless draw by Omonia at GSP Stadium and dropped to the third place, three points behind leaders AEL Limassol.

==== Play-offs ====
On 23 March 2014, in its first Championship play-off match, APOEL maintained the pressure on AEL Limassol with a slender 2–1 win over Ermis Aradippou at Ammochostos Stadium. Tomás De Vincenti opened the score when he converted a 42nd minute penalty and Efstathios Aloneftis headed in the second two minutes from the end, after an excellent cross by César Santin. An own goal from Kaká in the added time ensured a nervy finish for APOEL, which climbed up to second place, three points off the top. On 29 March 2014, in one of their best performances this season, APOEL thrashed Apollon Limassol 3–0 at GSP Stadium. Gustavo Manduca opened the score midway through the first half, while Cillian Sheridan doubled the score with a superb solo effort before Vinícius finish off a great APOEL move in the last minute. On 5 April 2014, APOEL were held to a goalless draw by Omonia at GSP Stadium and remained three points behind leaders AEL Limassol, which they also drew against Apollon. On 13 April 2014, APOEL got hard-earned 1–0 win over Anorthosis at Antonis Papadopoulos Stadium, breaking the deadlock through Vinícius in the 73rd minute. On 22 April 2014, APOEL thrashed AEL Limassol 3–0 at GSP Stadium and climbed to the top of the league table, level on points with AEL. APOEL got off to a great start when Efstathios Aloneftis crossed the ball and Nuno Morais headed past AEL keeper Karim Fegrouche in the fifth minute. Four minutes before half time Tiago Gomes released Constantinos Charalambides on the right side and his cross was headed past Fegrouche by César Santin. The icing on the cake came late on in the game when APOEL's midfielder Nuno Morais ran clear and set Gustavo Manduca up for an easy third goal. On 26 April 2014, APOEL's 23-match unbeaten run ended by Ermis Aradippou which won 2–1 at GSP Stadium and forced APOEL to their first home defeat of the season. Marco Tagbajumi gave Ermis the lead early in the second half, with APOEL unable to break down a resolute Ermis rearguard until the 80th minute when defender Marios Antoniades equalised from close range, but five minutes from time Dragan Žarković netted the winner. On 3 May 2014, APOEL were beaten 1–2 at Tsirion Stadium by Apollon Limassol and remained to the second place, six points off the top. Despite taking an early lead through Nuno Morais and seemingly in control of the game, APOEL collapsed for a second consecutive game and conceded two goals in each half by Apollon's striker Abraham Gneki Guié. On 7 May 2014, APOEL managed to defeat their bitter rivals Omonia 2–1 at home and closed the gap at the top to three points, taking advantage of AEL Limassol's 0–1 defeat by Apollon. Tomás De Vincenti opened the scoring for APOEL with a direct free kick in the 23rd minute, but fifteen minutes later Alípio equalised with the same way. The winning goal came from Aldo Adorno in the 76th minute, two minutes after he had come on as a substitute. On 11 May 2014, APOEL trashed Anorthosis 8–1 at home and after AEL's win the champion would be decided on the last day. Brazilian defender Kaká opened the score in the fifth minute and when Anorthosis defender Demetris Economou was sent off for tripping Irish forward Cillian Sheridan in the penalty area it was all over. Tomás De Vincenti grabbed a hat-trick, Kaká a brace with João Guilherme, Cillian Sheridan and Mário Sérgio also getting on the scoreboard, while Nuno Morais put the ball into his own net to score Anorthosis' only goal. On 17 May 2014, AEL Limassol hosted APOEL at Tsirion Stadium in the title decider match of the First Division. Unfortunately, the referee suspended the match just six minutes into the second half (when the score was still at 0–0), when firecrackers thrown by AEL fans, hit and injured APOEL's Brazilian defender Kaká, who was put on stretchers and rushed to hospital. After Cyprus Football Association's decision the match was replayed on 31 May 2014, behind closed doors at the neutral Antonis Papadopoulos Stadium. APOEL, who needed to win their league-deciding replay in order to pip AEL's charges on head-to-head record, scored through Cillian Sheridan on the brink of half-time and won their second consecutive league title, in one of the most hotly contested championships in recent years. Simultaneously, APOEL completed a historical domestic treble, winning all the season's titles in Cyprus, the League, the Cup and the Super Cup. However, on 6 June 2014, the Cyprus Football Association's (CFA) disciplinary committee – acting as an appeals board – unanimously cancelled on the CFA council's decision to repeat the 17 May championship final between AEL and APOEL, awarding the match to APOEL with a 0–3 score.

=== Cypriot Cup ===
==== First round ====
In the first round of the Cypriot Cup, APOEL were drawn to play a single knock-out match against Cypriot B2 Division side Digenis Oroklinis. The match was held on 19 December 2013, and APOEL needed extra time to beat Digenis Oroklinis 4–2 on the artificial turf of the Oroklini Municipal Stadium. Marios Elia opened the scoring in the 15th minute with a penalty kick and Andreas Parpas equalised for Digenis with a direct free kick in the 50th minute. Two minutes later, Cillian Sheridan put APOEL in front but Pantelis Tavrou equaliser in the 74th minute took the match to extra time. During the extra 30 minutes, APOEL were better side and struck twice with a header from Cillian Sheridan in the 104th minute and with a penalty kick from Gustavo Manduca seven minutes before the end.

==== Second round ====
APOEL were drawn to face AEL Limassol in a two-leg match-up for the second round of the Cypriot Cup. On 8 January 2014, in the first leg of their Cypriot Cup second round clash, APOEL secured a narrow 1–0 advantage over AEL Limassol at GSP Stadium after Irish striker Cillian Sheridan scored from close range in the 40th minute.

On 22 January 2014, APOEL recorded another 1–0 win over AEL Limassol at Tsirion Stadium for an aggregate 2–0 victory over last season's beaten finalists in the second round of the Cypriot Cup. Gustavo Manduca scored the only goal of the game in the 64th minute, converting Tomás De Vincenti's cross, to secure APOEL's progression into the quarter-finals for the first time since the 2009–10 season, also getting revenge over AEL Limassol who knocked them out at this stage of the competition in the last two seasons.

==== Quarter-finals ====
APOEL were drawn to face Alki Larnaca in a two-leg match-up for the quarter-finals of the Cypriot Cup. In the first-leg match which was held on 12 February 2014, Georgios Donis decided to rest many first-team players and as a result APOEL were held to a goalless draw by Alki at GSZ Stadium.

On 19 February 2014, APOEL easily beat Alki Larnaca 3–0 at GSP Stadium and qualified for the Cypriot Cup semi-finals for the first time in four years. After a goalless first half, APOEL made the breakthrough in the 46th minute with a goal from Constantinos Charalambides. Twenty minutes later, Gustavo Manduca scored another one for APOEL, while Constantinos Charalambides struck again with a beautiful long shot sixteen minutes before the end.

==== Semi-finals ====
APOEL were drawn to face Doxa Katokopias in a two-leg match-up for the semi-finals of the Cypriot Cup. On 2 April 2014, in first leg semi-final tie, APOEL all but booked their place in the final with a resounding 4–1 home win over Doxa Katokopias. Nektarios Alexandrou opened the scoring with a close range effort in the 20th minute, but Doxa equalised in the 62nd minute after Diogo Ramos headed the ball past APOEL's keeper. Marcelo Oliveira fired APOEL back into the lead a couple of minutes later and then Constantinos Charalambides bagged a brace to give APOEL a 4–1 win that would be enough to send them into the Cup final.

On 9 April 2014, despite fielding a team based only on reserve players, APOEL easily beat Doxa Katokopias 4–0 at Makario Stadium and reached the Cup final, with Christos Pipinis, a brace from Aldo Adorno and César Santin getting the goals.

==== Final ====
On 21 May 2014, APOEL won their 20th Cypriot Cup following a comfortable 2–0 win over Ermis Aradippou at GSP Stadium. The club had not won the trophy since the 2007–08 season but the first half goals from Tomás De Vincenti and Cillian Sheridan ensured that the cup would be going back to APOEL after a six-year absence.

It did not take long for Georgios Donis’ side to get the breakthrough. After some patient build-up play from APOEL, Tomás De Vincenti was played through and the Argentine showed great composure to give his side the lead after just six minutes. APOEL continued to dominate the game and on 28 minutes they doubled their lead. Tomás De Vincenti was involved again, laying the ball off to Tiago Gomes who shook off pressure from Ermis defence before playing the ball across goal with Cillian Sheridan on hand for an easy finish to give APOEL a significant lead. Ermis put up a good fight but were ultimately outplayed by a team with far more experience in the big matches.

=== UEFA Champions League ===
==== Third qualifying round ====
The team won the national league the previous season and as such entered the third qualifying round of the 2013–14 UEFA Champions League. APOEL were drawn against Slovenian side Maribor. In the first leg, APOEL drew 1–1 with Maribor at GSP Stadium. APOEL took the lead in the 21st minute with a goal by Nuno Morais. Maribor equalised in the 64th minute, when Marcos Tavares scored for the final score of 1–1. In the second leg, APOEL took the initiative from the first whistle and maintained a 60% ball possession at Ljudski vrt, but they only managed a goalless draw against Maribor and were eliminated on away goals rule after a 1–1 aggregate score.

=== UEFA Europa League ===
==== Play-off round ====
After being eliminated from the UEFA Champions League, APOEL dropped down into the UEFA Europa League play-off round, and was drawn against Belgian side Zulte Waregem. The first leg was held at the Constant Vanden Stock Stadium in Brussels and ended in a 1–1 draw. In the second leg, APOEL lost 2–1 at GSP Stadium and were eliminated.

==== Group stage ====

APOEL's 2013–14 UEFA Europa League starting line-up that managed to beat Bordeaux 2–1 at home and secured its first ever victory in the UEFA Europa League group stages.

Despite losing to Zulte Waregem in the play-off round, APOEL reinstated in Europa League, replacing the Turkish side Fenerbahçe who were banned because of the match-fixing case related to the 2010–11 Süper Lig title. APOEL were selected by a random drawing among all the losing teams from the play-off round. APOEL were drawn in Group F, alongside Bordeaux, Eintracht Frankfurt and Maccabi Tel Aviv. APOEL finished in third place with five points out of six matches.

== Squad ==
As of 29 January 2014

Note: Flags indicate national team as defined under FIFA eligibility rules; some limited exceptions apply. Players may hold more than one non-FIFA nationality.

No.	Pos.	Nation	Player
3	DF	BRA	João Guilherme
4	MF	CYP	Kostakis Artymatas
6	DF	BRA	Marcelo Oliveira
8	MF	POR	Tiago Gomes
9	FW	IRL	Cillian Sheridan
10	MF	CYP	Constantinos Charalambides (vice-captain)
11	MF	CYP	Nektarios Alexandrou
12	FW	PAR	Aldo Adorno
14	DF	GRE	Christos Pipinis
15	DF	CYP	Marios Antoniades
16	MF	BRA	Vinícius
17	MF	CYP	Marinos Satsias (captain)
18	MF	TUN	Selim Benachour
19	DF	CYP	Marios Elia
20	FW	CYP	Pieros Sotiriou

No.	Pos.	Nation	Player
21	MF	BRA	Gustavo Manduca
22	GK	GRE	Dionisis Chiotis
26	MF	POR	Nuno Morais (2nd vice-captain)
27	DF	ESP	Aritz Borda
28	DF	POR	Mário Sérgio (4th captain)
30	MF	ARG	Tomás De Vincenti
31	MF	CYP	Vasilios Papafotis
44	DF	CYP	Nicholas Ioannou
46	FW	CYP	Efstathios Aloneftis
70	FW	BRA	César Santin
73	DF	BRA	Kaká
77	DF	CYP	Athos Solomou
78	GK	ESP	Urko Pardo
88	GK	CYP	Tasos Kissas
96	GK	GRE	Konstantinos Vasilevski

For recent transfers, see List of Cypriot football transfers summer 2013.
Also, see List of Cypriot football transfers winter 2013–14.

=== Out on loan ===
Note: Flags indicate national team as defined under FIFA eligibility rules; some limited exceptions apply. Players may hold more than one non-FIFA nationality.

No.	Pos.	Nation	Player
—	MF	CYP	Markos Charalambous (at Olympiakos Nicosia)

=== International players ===
- (Cyprus) Nektarios Alexandrou
- (Cyprus) Efstathios Aloneftis
- (Cyprus) Marios Antoniades
- (Cyprus) Kostakis Artymatas
- (Cyprus) Constantinos Charalambides
- (Cyprus) Tasos Kissas
- (Cyprus) Athos Solomou
- (Cyprus) Pieros Sotiriou

- (Cyprus) Kostakis Artymatas (U-21)
- (Cyprus) Pieros Sotiriou (U-21)
- (Cyprus) Christos Djamas (U-21 & U-19)
- (Cyprus) Vasilios Papafotis (U-19)

=== Foreign players ===
EU Nationals

- (Greece) (Europe) Dionisis Chiotis
- (Greece) (Europe) Christos Pipinis
- (Portugal) (Europe) Nuno Morais
- (Portugal) (Europe) Mário Sérgio
- (Portugal) (Europe) Tiago Gomes
- (Republic of Ireland) (Europe) Cillian Sheridan
- (Spain) (Europe) Aritz Borda
- (Spain) (Belgium) (Europe) Urko Pardo

EU Nationals (Dual citizenship)

- (Brazil) (Italy) (Europe) Gustavo Manduca
- (Paraguay) (Spain) (Europe) Aldo Adorno
- (Tunisia) (France) (Europe) Selim Benachour
- (Argentina) (Italy) (Europe) Tomás De Vincenti

Non-EU Nationals

- (Brazil) Marcelo Oliveira
- (Brazil) João Guilherme
- (Brazil) Vinícius
- (Brazil) César Santin
- (Brazil) Kaká

=== Squad changes ===
In:

No.	Pos.	Nat.	Name	Age	EU	Moving from	Type	Transfer window	Ends	Transfer fee	Source
—	CM	(Cyprus)	Panayiotou	20	EU	Olympiakos Nicosia	Loan Return →	Summer	2014	—	—
20	CF	(Cyprus)	Sotiriou	20	EU	Olympiakos Nicosia	Transfer ✓	Summer	2017	€70K	apoelfc.com.cy
3	CB	(Brazil)	João Guilherme	27	Non-EU	Marítimo (Portugal)	Transfer ✓	Summer	2015	Free	apoelfc.com.cy
8	CM	(Portugal)	Gomes	27	EU	Blackpool (England)	Transfer ✓	Summer	2015	Free	apoelfc.com.cy
4	DM	(Cyprus)	Artymatas	20	EU	Enosis Neon Paralimni	Transfer ✓	Summer	2017	€120K	apoelfc.com.cy
25	LB	(Brazil)	Christian	24	Non-EU	Grêmio Anápolis (Brazil)	Loan →	Summer	2014	Undisclosed	apoelfc.com.cy
9	CF	(Republic of Ireland)	Sheridan	24	EU	Kilmarnock (Scotland)	Transfer ✓	Summer	2014	Undisclosed	apoelfc.com.cy
23	CF	(Portugal)	Gonçalves	22	EU	Rio Ave (Portugal)	Loan →	Summer	2014	Undisclosed	apoelfc.com.cy
16	CM	(Brazil)	Vinícius	27	Non-EU	Braga (Portugal)	Transfer ✓	Summer	2015	Free	apoelfc.com.cy
55	LB	(Portugal)	Cabral	29	EU	Académica (Portugal)	Transfer ✓	Summer	2014	Free	apoelfc.com.cy
70	CF	(Brazil)	Santin	32	Non-EU	Copenhagen (Denmark)	Transfer ✓	Winter	2015	€50K	apoelfc.com.cy
14	LB	(Greece)	Pipinis	29	EU	Asteras Tripolis (Greece)	Transfer ✓	Winter	2015	Free	apoelfc.com.cy
30	AM	(Argentina)	De Vincenti	24	EU	Olympiacos (Greece)	Loan →	Winter	2014	Free	apoelfc.com.cy
73	CB	(Brazil)	Kaká	32	Non-EU	Deportivo La Coruña (Spain)	Transfer ✓	Winter	2015	Free	apoelfc.com.cy

Total expenditure: ▼€240K

Out:

No.	Pos.	Nat.	Name	Age	EU	Moving to	Type	Transfer window	Transfer fee	Source
—	CB	(Cyprus)	Christofides	20	EU	Alki Larnaca	Loan →	Summer	Free	kerkida.net
—	CM	(Cyprus)	Panayiotou	20	EU	Alki Larnaca	Loan →	Summer	Free	24sports.com.cy
16	CF	(Israel)	Biton	25	Non-EU	Standard Liège (Belgium)	Loan return →	Summer	—	sigmalive.com
20	DM	(Greece)	Tziolis	28	EU	Monaco (France)	Loan return →	Summer	—	sigmalive.com
1	GK	(Cyprus)	Constantinou	27	EU	Aris Limassol	End of contract ✗	Summer	Free	kerkida.net
23	CM	(Portugal)	Pinto	29	EU	Legia Warsaw (Poland)	End of contract ✗	Summer	Free	apoelfc.com.cy
55	CB	(Greece)	Karipidis	30	EU	Apollon Limassol	Mutual consent ✗	Summer	Free	apoelfc.com.cy
55	RW	(Denmark)	Beckmann	29	EU	IF Elfsborg (Sweden)	Mutual consent ✗	Summer	Free	apoelfc.com.cy
30	CB	(Angola)	Zuela	29	EU	Apollon Smyrnis (Greece)	Mutual consent ✗	Summer	Free	apoelfc.com.cy
5	LB	(Poland)	Klukowski	32	EU	Free agent	Contract termination ✗	Summer	Free	apoelfc.com.cy
40	AM	(Cyprus)	Charalambous	20	EU	Olympiakos Nicosia	Loan →	Summer	Free	sentragoal.com.cy
24	CF	(Portugal)	Gonçalves	22	EU	Rio Ave (Portugal)	Mutual consent ✗ Loan return →	Winter	—	apoelfc.com.cy
7	CF	(Croatia)	Budimir	27	EU	Panetolikos (Greece)	Mutual consent ✗	Winter	Free	apoelfc.com.cy
25	LB	(Brazil)	Christian	25	Non-EU	Grêmio Anápolis (Brazil)	Mutual consent ✗ Loan return →	Winter	—	apoelfc.com.cy
55	LB	(Portugal)	Cabral	29	EU	Free agent	Mutual consent ✗	Winter	Free	apoelfc.com.cy

Total income: ▲€0

Last updated: 29 January 2014

== Club ==
=== Management ===
Position	Staff
Manager	(Greece) Georgios Donis
Assistant manager	(Greece) Makis Angelinas
Assistant manager / Scouter	(Serbia) Miodrag Medan
Goalkeeping coach	(Greece) Panagiotis Maliaritsis
Fitness coach	(Greece) Grigoris Georgitsas
Team doctor	(Cyprus) Costas Schizas

Last updated: 11 October 2013
Source: apoelfc.com.cy

=== Kit ===
Supplier: Puma
Sponsor(s): MTN, Cyprus Tourism Organization

Home	Away	Third

Source: apoelfc.com.cy

=== Other information ===
Chairman	(Cyprus) Phivos Erotokritou (Until 4 December 2013) (Cyprus) Prodromos Petrides (From 4 December 2013)
Ground (capacity and dimensions)	GSP Stadium (22,859 / 105x68 m)

Source: apoelfc.com.cy

== Squad stats ==
				Total						Cypriot First Division					Cypriot Cup					LTV Super Cup					Champions League & Europa League				
Country	N	P	Name	GS	A	Mins.	Gls.	Y	R	A	Mins.	Gls.	Y	R	A	Mins.	Gls.	Y	R	A	Mins.	Gls.	Y	R	A	Mins.	Gls.	Y	R
(Brazil)	3	CB	João Guilherme	40	41	3640	3	12		28	2440	3	8		4	390		1		1	90		1		8	720		2	
(Cyprus)	4	DM	Artymatas	9	15	776		2		9	362		1		5	324		1							1	90			
(Brazil)	6	CB	Oliveira	45	46	4052	2	17		31	2702	1	11		5	450	1	1		1	90				9	810		5	
(Croatia)	7	CF	Budimir	4	13	482	2	2	1	6	233	2	1		1	120				1	1				5	128		1	1
(Portugal)	8	CM	Gomes	18	27	1701		1		15	912		1		4	306				1	83				7	400			
(Republic of Ireland)	9	CF	Sheridan	21	39	2067	9	1		26	1180	5	1		7	517	4			1	90				5	280			
(Cyprus)	10	RM	Charalambides	37	48	3220	7	4		32	2189	3	1		7	505	4	1							9	526		2	
(Cyprus)	11	LM	Alexandrou	23	39	2183	4	4		22	1302	1	2		7	356	1	1		1	23				9	502	2	1	
(Paraguay)	12	RW	Adorno		5	144	3			4	111	1			1	33	2												
(Greece)	14	LB	Pipinis	12	14	867	1	4	1	10	536		3	1	4	331	1	1											
(Cyprus)	15	LB	Antoniades	19	19	1484	1	6		16	1270	1	4		2	150		2							1	64			
(Brazil)	16	CM	Vinícius	43	48	3632	5	9		32	2590	5	7		7	460				1	7				8	575		2	
(Cyprus)	17	DM	Satsias	1	5	107				4	17				1	90													
(Tunisia)	18	AM	Benachour	15	28	1474	1	2		19	943	1	1		3	271				1	89				5	171		1	
(Cyprus)	19	RB	Elia	2	3	239	1	1		1	29				2	210	1	1											
(Cyprus)	20	CF	Sotiriou	3	9	382		1		5	211														4	171		1	
(Brazil)	21	LW	Manduca	33	42	2770	16	6		29	2024	13	3		6	304	3	1		1	90				6	352		2	
(Greece)	22	GK	Chiotis	10	10	900	-4	1		2	180	-1			7	630	-1	1							1	90	-2		
(Portugal)	23	CF	Gonçalves	13	17	1173	5	2	1	10	655	3								1	67				6	451	2	2	1
(Brazil)	25	LB	Christian	11	13	1007		3		4	276		1		1	80		1		1	90				7	561		1	
(Portugal)	26	DM	Morais	49	52	4387	6	8		34	2925	5	6		7	517		1		1	90				10	855	1	1	
(Spain)	27	CB	Borda	17	20	1506		4	1	11	752		3	1	4	304									5	450		1	
(Portugal)	28	RB	Mário Sérgio	49	49	4381	3	6		35	3121	2	5		4	360				1	90	1	1		9	810			
(Argentina)	30	AM	De Vincenti	18	20	1399	13	6		16	1105	12	6		4	294	1												
(Cyprus)	31	RM	Papafotis		3	98				2	39				1	59													
(Cyprus)	46	LW	Aloneftis	34	42	3076	9	3		30	2262	8	2		3	185		1							9	629	1		
(Portugal)	55	LB	Cabral	10	11	864		1		7	590		1												4	274			
(Brazil)	70	CF	Santin	8	24	1078	7	1		20	921	6	1		4	157	1												
(Brazil)	73	CB	Kaká	9	10	816	3			6	456	3			4	360													
(Cyprus)	77	RB	Solomou	7	12	699		2		4	195		1		5	367									3	137		1	
(Spain)	78	GK	Pardo	44	44	3960	-34	2		34	3060	-24	1							1	90				9	810	-10	1	
(Cyprus)	88	GK	Kissas	1	1	120	-2								1	120	-2												
(Cyprus)	95	DM	Djamas																										
(Greece)	96	GK	Vasilevski																										

Last updated: 31 May 2014
Source: Match reports in competitive matches, apoelfc.com.cy
Ordered by start team, game starts and position on pitch (from back right to front left)
0 shown as blank
Country: when 2 flags, 1st flag = country that plays for internationally, 2nd flag = country of birth; N = number on jersey; P = Position; Name = Name on jersey (for more extended name, pause the mouse pointer on the name); GS = Game Started; A = Appearances.

=== Top scorers ===
R	Player	Position	League	Cup	Super Cup	Europe^{1}	Total
1	(Brazil) Manduca	LW	13	3	0	0	16
2	(Argentina) De Vincenti	AM	12	1	0	0	13
3	(Cyprus) Aloneftis	LW	8	0	0	1	9
3	(Republic of Ireland) Sheridan	CF	5	4	0	0	9
5	(Brazil) Santin	CF	6	1	0	0	7
5	(Cyprus) Charalambides	RM	3	4	0	0	7
7	(Portugal) Morais	DM	5	0	0	1	6
8	(Brazil) Vinícius	CM	5	0	0	0	5
8	(Portugal) Gonçalves	CF	3	0	0	2	5
10	(Cyprus) Alexandrou	LM	1	1	0	2	4
11	(Brazil) Kaká	CB	3	0	0	0	3
11	(Brazil) João Guilherme	CB	3	0	0	0	3
11	(Portugal) Mário Sérgio	RB	2	0	1	0	3
11	(Paraguay) Adorno	RW	1	2	0	0	3
15	(Croatia) Budimir	CF	2	0	0	0	2
15	(Brazil) Oliveira	CB	1	1	0	0	2
17	(Tunisia) Benachour	AM	1	0	0	0	1
17	(Cyprus) Antoniades	LB	1	0	0	0	1
17	(Greece) Pipinis	LB	0	1	0	0	1
17	(Cyprus) Elia	RB	0	1	0	0	1
Own goals			3	0	0	0	3
TOTAL			78	19	1	6	104

Last updated: 31 May 2014
^{1}Included both UEFA Champions League and Europa League competitions.
Source: Match reports in Competitive matches, apoelfc.com.cy

=== Captains ===
1. (Cyprus) Marinos Satsias
2. (Cyprus) Constantinos Charalambides
3. (Cyprus) Nektarios Alexandrou
4. (Portugal) Nuno Morais

== Pre-season friendlies ==
7 July 2013 Friendly	FK Baumit Jablonec (Czech Republic)	2–1	(Cyprus) APOEL	Sportplatz Obertraun, Obertraun
19:00 EET	Piták 59'; Rossi 81'	(Report)	Sheridan 55'

8 July 2013 Friendly	SC Paderborn 07 (Germany)	2–0	(Cyprus) APOEL	Sportplatz Bischofshofen, Bischofshofen
17:30 EET	Zeitz 21'; Brückner 40'	(Report)

11 July 2013 Friendly	FC Zbrojovka Brno (Czech Republic)	1–1	(Cyprus) APOEL	Sportplatz Bischofshofen, Bischofshofen
18:00 EET	Škoda 90+1' (pen.)	(Report)	Artymatas 67'

12 July 2013 Friendly	FC Slovácko (Czech Republic)	2–2	(Cyprus) APOEL	Sportanlage Finsterloch, Straßwalchen
18:00 EET	Kuncl 25'; Trousil 81'	(Report)	Manduca 17' (pen.), 40' (pen.)

17 July 2013 Friendly	PAOK (Greece)	1–0	(Cyprus) APOEL	Paltenstadion Rottenmann, Rottenmann
19:00 EET	Salpingidis 16'	(Report)

19 July 2013 Friendly	TSG 1899 Hoffenheim (Germany)	3–0	(Cyprus) APOEL	Sportplatz Bischofshofen, Bischofshofen
19:00 EET	Rudy 36' (pen.); Herdling 74'; Elyounoussi 82'	(Report)

23 July 2013 Friendly	APOEL (Cyprus)	2–1	(Cyprus) Doxa Katokopias	GSP Stadium, Nicosia
20:00 EET	Manduca 31' (pen.); Gonçalves 87'	(Report)	Pavlović 24'	Attendance: 8,000; Referee: Antonis Christodoulou

== Mid-season friendlies ==
15 November 2013 Friendly	APOEL (Cyprus)	3–1	(Cyprus) Olympiakos Nicosia	Archangelos Training Centre, Nicosia
16:00 EET	Sheridan 2', 3'; Papafotis 22'	(Report)	Sotiriou 65'	Attendance: Behind closed doors

14 January 2014 Friendly	APOEL (Cyprus)	3–1	(Cyprus) PAEEK	Archangelos Training Centre, Nicosia
15:45 EET	Benachour 8'; De Vincenti 35' (pen.); Adorno 61'	(Report)	Unknown 65'	Attendance: Behind closed doors

28 January 2014 Friendly	APOEL (Cyprus)	1–0	(Cyprus) Olympiakos Nicosia	Archangelos Training Centre, Nicosia
15:30 EET	Adorno 11'	(Report)		Attendance: Behind closed doors

== Competitions ==
=== Overall ===
Competition	Started round	Final position / round	First match	Last match
Cypriot First Division	—	Winners	2 September 2013	31 May 2014
UEFA Champions League	Third qualifying round	Third qualifying round	31 July 2013	6 August 2013
UEFA Europa League	Play-off round	Group stage	22 August 2013	12 December 2013
Cypriot Cup	1st round	Winners	19 December 2013	21 May 2014
LTV Super Cup	Final	Winners	17 August 2013	

Updated to match played 31 May 2014
Source: Competitions

=== Cypriot First Division ===
==== Classification ====
Pos	Team	Pld	W	D	L	GF	GA	GD	Pts	Qualification or relegation
1	AEL Limassol	26	19	5	2	48	16	+32	62	Qualification for the championship group
2	Apollon Limassol	26	19	2	5	47	19	+28	59 (Note: APOL 2–0 APOE; APOE 2–1 APOL)	Qualification for the championship group
3	APOEL	26	18	5	3	56	18	+38	59	Qualification for the championship group
4	Ermis Aradippou	26	15	7	4	44	28	+16	52	Qualification for the championship group
5	Omonia Nicosia	26	13	8	5	45	22	+23	47	Qualification for the championship group

Source: CFA, UEFA
Rules for classification: 1) points; 2) head-to-head points; 3) head-to-head goal difference; 4) head-to-head away goals scored; 5) goal difference; 6) number of goals scored

==== Results summary ====
Overall								Home						Away					
Pld	W	D	L	GF	GA	GD	Pts	W	D	L	GF	GA	GD	W	D	L	GF	GA	GD
36	25	6	5	78	25	+53	81	15	2	1	50	10	+40	10	4	4	28	15	+13

Last updated: 31 May 2014.
Source: UEFA

==== Results by round ====
Round	1	2	3	4	5	6	7	8	9	10	11	12	13	14	15	16	17	18	19	20	21	22	23	24	25	26	27	28	29	30	31	32	33	34	35	36
Ground	H	A	H	A	H	A	H	A	H	A	H	A	H	A	H	A	H	A	H	A	H	A	H	A	H	A	A	H	A	A	H	H	A	H	H	A
Result	W	L	D	W	W	L	W	L	W	D	W	W	W	W	D	D	W	W	W	W	W	W	W	W	W	D	W	W	D	W	W	L	L	W	W	W
Position	1	6	6	5	5	7	6	6	6	6	6	6	4	3	4	4	4	4	3	3	2	2	2	2	2	3	2	2	2	2	1	2	2	2	2	1

Updated to match(es) played on 31 May 2014. Source: apoelfc.com.cy
A = Away; H = Home; W = Win; D = Draw; L = Loss

=== Play-offs ===
The first 12 teams are divided into two groups. Points are carried over from the regular season.

==== Championship group ====
Pos	Team	Pld	W	D	L	GF	GA	GD	Pts	Qualification
1	APOEL (C)	36	25	6	5	80	25	+55	81 (Note: APOEL: 7 pts; AEL: 4 pts)	Qualification for the Champions League third qualifying round
2	AEL Limassol	36	25	6	5	68	29	+39	81	Qualification for the Champions League third qualifying round
3	Apollon Limassol	36	24	5	7	66	29	+37	77	Qualification for the Europa League play-off round (Note: Since cup winners APOEL qualified for the 2014-15 UEFA Champions League and the runners-up Ermis finished top-four, all of the Europa League spots revert into league positions.)
4	Ermis Aradippou	36	18	8	10	55	54	+1	62	Qualification for the Europa League third qualifying round
5	Omonia Nicosia	36	16	11	9	59	37	+22	59	Qualification for the Europa League second qualifying round
6	Anorthosis Famagusta	36	12	6	18	57	64	−7	42	

Source: CFA, UEFA
Rules for classification: 1) points; 2) head-to-head points; 3) head-to-head goal difference; 4) head-to-head goals scored; 5) goal difference; 6) number of goals scored.
(C) Champions

=== Matches ===
Kick-off times are in EET.

==== Regular season ====
2 September 2013 Matchweek 1	APOEL	3–0	E. N. Paralimni	GSP Stadium, Nicosia
19:00 EET	Vinícius 58'; Charalambides 86'; João Guilherme 90+4'	(Report 1) (Report 2)		Attendance: 6,757; Referee: Marios Panayi

14 September 2013 Matchweek 2	AEL Limassol	2–1	APOEL	Tsirion Stadium, Limassol
19:00 EET	Ouon 10'; Sá 40'	(Report 1) (Report 2)	Gaúcho 57' (o.g.)	Attendance: 6,354; Referee: Demetris Chrysostomou

23 September 2013 Matchweek 3	APOEL	1–1	AEK Larnaca	GSP Stadium, Nicosia
19:00 EET	Aloneftis 56'	(Report 1) (Report 2)	Mitidis 39'	Attendance: 6,428; Referee: Ioannis Anastasiou

28 September 2013 Matchweek 4	Nea Salamina	0–1	APOEL	Ammochostos Stadium, Larnaca
19:00 EET		(Report 1) (Report 2)	Mário Sérgio 45'	Attendance: 1,280; Referee: Antonis Christodoulou

7 October 2013 Matchweek 5	APOEL	1–0	Aris Limassol	GSP Stadium, Nicosia
19:00 EET	Morais 13'	(Report 1) (Report 2)		Attendance: 4,741; Referee: Demetris Masias

19 October 2013 Matchweek 6	Ermis Aradippou	2–0	APOEL	Ammochostos Stadium, Larnaca
19:00 EET	Henrique 81', 90+5' (pen.)	(Report 1) (Report 2)		Attendance: 1,390; Referee: Demetris Chrysostomou

28 October 2013 Matchweek 7	APOEL	1–0	Anorthosis	GSP Stadium, Nicosia
19:00 EET	João Guilherme 52'	(Report 1) (Report 2)		Attendance: 8,862; Referee: Leontios Trattos

2 November 2013 Matchweek 8	Apollon Limassol	2–0	APOEL	Tsirion Stadium, Limassol
15:00 EET	Papoulis 62'; Gullón 79'	(Report 1) (Report 2)		Attendance: 7,410; Referee: Marios Panayi

11 November 2013 Matchweek 9	APOEL	3–0	Alki Larnaca	GSP Stadium, Nicosia
19:00 EET	Budimir 25', 66'; Laifis 77' (o.g.)	(Report 1) (Report 2)		Attendance: Behind closed doors Referee: Giorgos Nikolaou

23 November 2013 Matchweek 10	Doxa Katokopias	1–1	APOEL	Makario Stadium, Nicosia
19:00 EET	Fernandes 41'; Kingson (red card) 90+4'	(Report 1) (Report 2)	Manduca 67' (pen.); Borda (yellow card) 90+3' (yellow-red card)	Attendance: 1,815; Referee: Christos Nicolaides

2 December 2013 Matchweek 11	APOEL	5–0	AEK Kouklia	GSP Stadium, Nicosia
19:00 EET	Gonçalves 30', 56', 84'; Manduca 44' (pen.); Charalambides 54'	(Report 1) (Report 2)	Kairinos (red card) 41'	Attendance: 3,707; Referee: Loukas Soteriou

7 December 2013 Matchweek 12	Ethnikos Achna	0–2	APOEL	Dasaki Stadium, Achna
19:00 EET	Coundoul (red card) 68'	(Report 1) (Report 2)	Manduca 70' (pen.); Sheridan 90+1'	Attendance: 886; Referee: Charalambos Skapoullis

16 December 2013 Matchweek 13	APOEL	2–0	Omonia	GSP Stadium, Nicosia
19:00 EET	Manduca 54'; Morais 74'	(Report 1) (Report 2)		Attendance: 12,054; Referee: Demetris Masias

22 December 2013 Matchweek 14	E. N. Paralimni	0–3	APOEL	Tasos Markou Stadium, Paralimni
15:00 EET		(Report 1) (Report 2)	Aloneftis 4'; Oliveira 53'; Vinícius 73'	Attendance: 1,380; Referee: Kostas Psevdiotis

4 January 2014 Matchweek 15	APOEL	2–2	AEL Limassol	GSP Stadium, Nicosia
15:00 EET	Aloneftis 26'; Manduca 29' (pen.)	(Report 1) (Report 2)	Monteiro 6'; Sá 34'; Sachetti (yellow card) 81' (yellow-red card)	Attendance: 9,816; Referee: Ioannis Anastasiou

11 January 2014 Matchweek 16	AEK Larnaca	1–1	APOEL	GSZ Stadium, Larnaca
15:00 EET	Tomás 29'	(Report 1) (Report 2)	Charalambides 31'	Attendance: 2,620; Referee: Christos Nicolaides

19 January 2014 Matchweek 17	APOEL	3–1	Nea Salamina	GSP Stadium, Nicosia
18:00 EET	Manduca 29'; Santin 35'; Benachour 48'	(Report 1) (Report 2)	Roque 63'	Attendance: Behind closed doors Referee: Marios Panayi

25 January 2014 Matchweek 18	Aris Limassol	1–3	APOEL	Tsirion Stadium, Limassol
18:00 EET	Dina 21'	(Report 1) (Report 2)	Manduca 43'; Oliva 44' (o.g.); Vinícius 73'	Attendance: 1,610; Referee: Thomas Mouskos

1 February 2014 Matchweek 19	APOEL	3–0	Ermis Aradippou	GSP Stadium, Nicosia
18:00 EET	Aloneftis 35'; De Vincenti 55', 60' (pen.)	(Report 1) (Report 2)		Attendance: 7,154; Referee: Leontios Trattos

5 February 2014 Matchweek 20	Anorthosis	1–2	APOEL	Antonis Papadopoulos Stadium, Larnaca
19:00 EET	Colautti 76'	(Report 1) (Report 2)	De Vincenti 18' (pen.); Sheridan 81'	Attendance: 4,035; Referee: Marios Panayi

9 February 2014 Matchweek 21	APOEL	2–1	Apollon Limassol	GSP Stadium, Nicosia
17:00 EET	De Vincenti 67' (pen.), 74'	(Report 1) (Report 2)	Sangoy 11'	Attendance: 10,601; Referee: Demetris Masias

15 February 2014 Matchweek 22	Alki Larnaca	1–3	APOEL	GSZ Stadium, Larnaca
18:00 EET	Kyprianou 85'	(Report 1) (Report 2)	Morais 20'; Kaká 61'; Santin 70'	Attendance: 773; Referee: Avraam Tsoukkas

22 February 2014 Matchweek 23	APOEL	5–1	Doxa Katokopias	GSP Stadium, Nicosia
18:00 EET	Aloneftis 22', 36', 52'; Manduca 45+1', 73'	(Report 1) (Report 2)	Toni (red card) 2'; Nilson 56'	Attendance: 3,920; Referee: Charalambos Skapoullis

9 March 2014 Matchweek 24	AEK Kouklia	1–6	APOEL	Pafiako Stadium, Paphos
16:00 EET	Pitsillos (red card) 23'; Garpozis 32'	(Report 1) (Report 2)	De Vincenti 16', 21'; Manduca 24' (pen.); Alexandrou 54'; Santin 71', 73'	Attendance: 1,187; Referee: Kostas Psevdiotis

15 March 2014 Matchweek 25	APOEL	2–0	Ethnikos Achna	GSP Stadium, Nicosia
16:00 EET	Manduca 17'; Santin 26'	(Report 1) (Report 2)		Attendance: 4,493; Referee: Marios Tsaggaris

19 March 2014 Matchweek 26	Omonia	0–0	APOEL	GSP Stadium, Nicosia
18:00 EET		(Report 1) (Report 2)		Attendance: 10,072; Referee: Demetris Masias

==== Play-offs ====
23 March 2014 Matchweek 1	Ermis Aradippou	1–2	APOEL	Ammochostos Stadium, Larnaca
17:30 EET	Kaká 90+6' (o.g.)	(Report 1) (Report 2)	De Vincenti 42' (pen.); Aloneftis 88'	Attendance: 1,317; Referee: Kostas Psevdiotis

29 March 2014 Matchweek 2	APOEL	3–0	Apollon Limassol	GSP Stadium, Nicosia
17:00 EET	Manduca 21'; Sheridan 52'; Vinícius 90'	(Report 1) (Report 2)		Attendance: 6,553; Referee: Marios Tsaggaris

5 April 2014 Matchweek 3	Omonia	0–0	APOEL	GSP Stadium, Nicosia
18:00 EET		(Report 1) (Report 2)		Attendance: 11,186; Referee: Christos Nicolaides

13 April 2014 Matchweek 4	Anorthosis	0–1	APOEL	Antonis Papadopoulos Stadium, Larnaca
18:30 EET		(Report 1) (Report 2)	Vinícius 73'	Attendance: 2,159; Referee: Marios Panayi

22 April 2014 Matchweek 5	APOEL	3–0	AEL Limassol	GSP Stadium, Nicosia
18:00 EET	Morais 5'; Santin 41'; Manduca 83'; Pipinis (yellow card) 90' (yellow-red card)	(Report 1) (Report 2)		Attendance: 13,985; Referee: Demetris Masias

26 April 2014 Matchweek 6	APOEL	1–2	Ermis Aradippou	GSP Stadium, Nicosia
18:00 EET	Antoniades 81'	(Report 1) (Report 2)	Tagbajumi 58'; Žarković 85'	Attendance: 4,262; Referee: Marios Tsaggaris

3 May 2014 Matchweek 7	Apollon Limassol	2–1	APOEL	Tsirion Stadium, Limassol
18:00 EET	Gneki Guié 26', 67'	(Report 1) (Report 2)	Morais 11'	Attendance: 2,844; Referee: Georgios Nicolaou

7 May 2014 Matchweek 8	APOEL	2–1	Omonia	GSP Stadium, Nicosia
18:00 EET	De Vincenti 23'; Adorno 76'	(Report 1) (Report 2)	Alípio 38'	Attendance: 6,149; Referee: Antonis Christodoulou

11 May 2014 Matchweek 9	APOEL	8–1	Anorthosis	GSP Stadium, Nicosia
18:00 EET	Kaká 5', 40'; De Vincenti 17' (pen.), 23', 32' (pen.); João Guilherme 52'; Sheridan 64'; Mário Sérgio 81'	(Report 1) (Report 2)	Economou (red card) 16'; Morais 85' (o.g.)	Attendance: 4,244; Referee: Kostas Psevdiotis

31 May 2014 Matchweek 10	AEL Limassol	0–3; Awarded (Note: The 17 May 2014 match was abandoned (at 0–0) after 52 minutes, when firecrackers thrown by AEL fans, hit and injured APOEL's player Kaká. The match was replayed behind closed doors at a neutral stadium on 31 May 2014 and APOEL achieved to win their second consecutive league title after beating AEL Limassol by 1–0. However, on 6 June 2014, the Cyprus Football Association's (CFA) disciplinary committee – acting as an appeals board – unanimously cancelled on the CFA council's decision to repeat the 17 May championship final, awarding APOEL a 3–0 win.)	APOEL	Antonis Papadopoulos Stadium, Larnaca
18:00 EET		(Report 1) (Report 2)	Sheridan 45+1'	Attendance: Behind closed doors Referee: Demetris Masias

=== UEFA Champions League ===
==== Qualifying phase ====
===== Third qualifying round =====
31 July 2013 First Leg	APOEL (Cyprus)	1–1	(Slovenia) Maribor	GSP Stadium, Nicosia
19:00 CET	Gonçalves 21'	(Report 1) (Report 2)	Tavares 64'	Attendance: 17,387; Referee: Serhiy Boyko

6 August 2013 Second Leg	Maribor (Slovenia)	0–0 (1–1 (a) agg.)	(Cyprus) APOEL	Ljudski vrt, Maribor
20:00 CET		(Report 1) (Report 2)	Gonçalves (red card) 86'	Attendance: 12,100; Referee: Aleksei Kulbakov

=== UEFA Europa League ===
==== Qualifying phase ====
===== Play-off round =====
22 August 2013 First Leg	Zulte Waregem (Belgium)	1–1	(Cyprus) APOEL	Constant Vanden Stock Stadium, Anderlecht
20:45 CET	Malanda 21'	(Report 1) (Report 2)	Alexandrou 88'	Attendance: 5,095; Referee: Marijo Strahonja

29 August 2013 Second Leg	APOEL (Cyprus)	1–2 (2–3 agg.)	(Belgium) Zulte Waregem	GSP Stadium, Nicosia
19:00 CET	Aloneftis 52'	(Report 1) (Report 2)	Habibou 12'; Naessens 90'	Attendance: 18,959; Referee: Andre Marriner

==== Group stage ====
Note: Despite losing to Zulte Waregem in the play-off round, APOEL reinstated in Europa League replacing the Turkish side Fenerbahçe who were banned because of the match-fixing case related to the 2010–11 Süper Lig title. APOEL were selected by a random drawing among all the losing teams from the play-off round.

===== Standings =====
Pos	Team	Pld	W	D	L	GF	GA	GD	Pts	Qualification	EIN	MTA	APO	BOR
1	(Germany) Eintracht Frankfurt	6	5	0	1	13	4	+9	15	Advance to knockout phase	—	2–0	2–0	3–0
2	(Israel) Maccabi Tel Aviv	6	3	2	1	7	5	+2	11	Advance to knockout phase	4–2	—	0–0	1–0
3	(Cyprus) APOEL	6	1	2	3	3	8	−5	5		0–3	0–0	—	2–1
4	(France) Bordeaux	6	1	0	5	4	10	−6	3		0–1	1–2	2–1	—

Source: Soccerway

===== Matches =====
19 September 2013 Matchweek 1	Maccabi Tel Aviv (Israel)	0–0	(Cyprus) APOEL	Bloomfield Stadium, Tel Aviv
19:00 CET		(Report 1) (Report 2)		Attendance: 11,772; Referee: Carlos Clos Gómez

3 October 2013 Matchweek 2	APOEL (Cyprus)	0–3	(Germany) Eintracht Frankfurt	GSP Stadium, Nicosia
21:05 CET		(Report 1) (Report 2)	Alexandrou 27' (o.g.); Lakić 59'; Jung 66'	Attendance: 13,729; Referee: Alexandru Tudor

24 October 2013 Matchweek 3	Bordeaux (France)	2–1	(Cyprus) APOEL	Stade Chaban-Delmas, Bordeaux
21:05 CET	Sané 24'; Henrique 90'	(Report 1) (Report 2)	Gonçalves 45'	Attendance: 10,404; Referee: Martin Strömbergsson

7 November 2013 Matchweek 4	APOEL (Cyprus)	2–1	(France) Bordeaux	GSP Stadium, Nicosia
19:00 CET	Alexandrou 14'; Budimir (red card) 50'; Morais 55'	(Report 1) (Report 2)	Sané 45+2'; N'Guémo (yellow card) 50' (yellow-red card)	Attendance: 11,853; Referee: Sébastien Delferiere

28 November 2013 Matchweek 5	APOEL (Cyprus)	0–0	(Israel) Maccabi Tel Aviv	GSP Stadium, Nicosia
21:05 CET		(Report 1) (Report 2)		Attendance: 13,052; Referee: István Vad

12 December 2013 Matchweek 6	Eintracht Frankfurt (Germany)	2–0	(Cyprus) APOEL	Commerzbank-Arena, Frankfurt
19:00 CET	Schröck 68'; Djakpa 77'	(Report 1) (Report 2)		Attendance: 32,400; Referee: Stephan Studer

=== LTV Super Cup ===
17 August 2013 Final	APOEL	1–0	Apollon Limassol	GSP Stadium, Nicosia
20:00 EET	Mário Sérgio 35'	(Report 1) (Report 2)		Attendance: 5,558; Referee: Ioannis Anastasiou

APOEL won the 2013 Cypriot Super Cup (13th title).

=== Cypriot Cup ===
==== First round ====
19 December 2013 Knock-out	Digenis Oroklinis	2–4 (a.e.t.)	APOEL	Oroklini Municipal Stadium, Oroklini
14:30 EET	Parpas 50'; Tavrou 74'	(Report 1) (Report 2)	Elia 15' (pen.); Sheridan 52', 104'; Manduca 113' (pen.)	Attendance: 250; Referee: Avraam Tsoukkas

==== Second round ====
8 January 2014 First Leg	APOEL	1–0	AEL Limassol	GSP Stadium, Nicosia
19:00 EET	Sheridan 40'	(Report 1) (Report 2)	Dedé (yellow card) 90' (yellow-red card)	Attendance: Behind closed doors Referee: Marios Tsaggaris

22 January 2014 Second Leg	AEL Limassol	0–1 (0–2 agg.)	APOEL	Tsirion Stadium, Limassol
15:00 EET		(Report 1) (Report 2)	Manduca 64'	Attendance: 5,076; Referee: Demetris Masias

==== Quarter-finals ====
12 February 2014 First Leg	Alki Larnaca	0–0	APOEL	GSZ Stadium, Larnaca
18:00 EET		(Report 1) (Report 2)		Attendance: 500; Referee: Kostas Psevdiotis

19 February 2014 Second Leg	APOEL	3–0 (3–0 agg.)	Alki Larnaca	GSP Stadium, Nicosia
17:00 EET	Charalambides 47', 74'; Manduca 65'	(Report 1) (Report 2)		Attendance: 3,246; Referee: Thomas Mouskos

==== Semi-finals ====
2 April 2014 First Leg	APOEL	4–1	Doxa Katokopias	GSP Stadium, Nicosia
19:00 EET	Alexandrou 20'; Oliveira 65'; Charalambides 72', 75'	(Report 1) (Report 2)	Ramos 62'	Attendance: 4,006; Referee: Ioannis Anastasiou

9 April 2014 Second Leg	Doxa Katokopias	0–4 (1–8 agg.)	APOEL	Makario Stadium, Nicosia
16:00 EET		(Report 1) (Report 2)	Pipinis 45'; Adorno 60', 69'; Santin 71'	Attendance: 207; Referee: Leontios Trattos

==== Final ====
21 May 2014 Final	Ermis Aradippou	0–2	APOEL	GSP Stadium, Nicosia
19:00 EET		(Report 1) (Report 2)	De Vincenti 6'; Sheridan 28'	Attendance: 11,463; Referee: Christos Nicolaides

APOEL won the 2013–14 Cypriot Cup (20th title).
