= List of Cypriot football transfers winter 2013–14 =

This is a list of Cypriot football transfers for the 2013–14 winter transfer window by club. Only transfers of clubs in the Cypriot First Division and Cypriot Second Division are included.

The winter transfer window opened on 1 January 2014, although a few transfers took place prior to that date. The window will close at midnight on 31 January 2014. Players without a club may join one at any time, either during or in between transfer windows.

== Cypriot First Division ==
=== AEK Kouklia ===
In: Note: Flags indicate national team as defined under FIFA eligibility rules; some limited exceptions apply. Players may hold more than one non-FIFA nationality.

| No. | Pos. | Nation | Player |
|---|---|---|---|
| — | MF | POR | Hugo Moutinho (from Aris Limassol) |
| 25 | DF | CYP | Panayiotis Ioannou (from Aris Limassol) |
| 81 | MF | BRA | Paulo Sérgio (from (Portugal) S.C. Beira-Mar) |
| 30 | DF | CYP | Pantelis Pitsillos (from Ermis Aradippou) |

Out: Note: Flags indicate national team as defined under FIFA eligibility rules; some limited exceptions apply. Players may hold more than one non-FIFA nationality.

| No. | Pos. | Nation | Player |
|---|---|---|---|
| 21 | MF | CYP | Angelos Efthymiou (to Akritas Chlorakas) |
| 39 | FW | ARG | Nicolás Gianni (to (Argentina) Club Atlético Fénix) |
| 6 | DF | ARG | Mauricio Mazzetti (to (Iraq) Duhok SC) |
| 24 | FW | CYP | Costas Solomou (to Akritas Chlorakas) |
| 31 | FW | URU | Diego Silva (to (Latvia) FC Jūrmala) |
| 28 | MF | CYP | Ioannis Varnavidis (to Akritas Chlorakas) |

=== AEK Larnaca ===
In: Note: Flags indicate national team as defined under FIFA eligibility rules; some limited exceptions apply. Players may hold more than one non-FIFA nationality.

| No. | Pos. | Nation | Player |
|---|---|---|---|
| 33 | DF | NED | Serginho Greene (from (Serbia) FK Vojvodina) |
| 28 | MF | ISR | Hasan Abu Zaid (on loan from (Israel) Maccabi Tel Aviv) |
| 35 | GK | ESP | Miguel Escalona (from (Spain) CD Guadalajara) |

Out: Note: Flags indicate national team as defined under FIFA eligibility rules; some limited exceptions apply. Players may hold more than one non-FIFA nationality.

| No. | Pos. | Nation | Player |
|---|---|---|---|
| 17 | MF | GRE | Ilias Mihalopoulos (to (Greece) Kallithea) |
| 5 | MF | NED | Gregoor van Dijk (released) |
| 26 | DF | GRE | Giorgos Zigogiannis (loan return to (Greece) Panionios) |
| 25 | MF | ARG | Vicente Monje (to (Greece) Olympiacos Volos) |
| 9 | FW | COL | Harold Reina (loan return to (Colombia) Deportivo Cali) |
| 4 | MF | GRE | Stelios Marangos (to (Greece) Kerkyra) |
| 10 | FW | SLE | Mustapha Bangura (released) |
| 8 | MF | ARG | Adrián Lucero (to (Greece) Apollon Smyrnis) |
| 15 | GK | LTU | Emilijus Zubas (loan return to (Latvia) FK Daugava) |

=== AEL Limassol ===
In: Note: Flags indicate national team as defined under FIFA eligibility rules; some limited exceptions apply. Players may hold more than one non-FIFA nationality.

| No. | Pos. | Nation | Player |
|---|---|---|---|
| 99 | FW | SRB | Andrija Kaluđerović (on loan from (China) Beijing Guoan) |
| 22 | DF | SVN | Nejc Potokar (from (Slovenia) NK Maribor) |
| 80 | MF | ESP | Edu Oriol (from (Azerbaijan) Khazar Lankaran) |
| 6 | MF | BUL | Stanislav Genchev (from (Bulgaria) PFC Litex Lovech) |

Out: Note: Flags indicate national team as defined under FIFA eligibility rules; some limited exceptions apply. Players may hold more than one non-FIFA nationality.

| No. | Pos. | Nation | Player |
|---|---|---|---|
| 25 | DF | ANG | Miguel Quiame (on loan to (Angola) Benfica de Luanda) |
| 13 | DF | BRA | Diego Gaúcho (released) |
| 9 | FW | BRA | Cássio (to (Brazil) São Caetano) |
| 89 | FW | CYP | Kristis Andreou (to (Lithuania) Žalgiris) |
| 86 | FW | POR | Tiago Targino (to (Poland) Jagiellonia Białystok) |
| 10 | FW | POR | Orlando Sá (to (Poland) Legia Warsaw) |

=== Alki Larnaca ===
In: Note: Flags indicate national team as defined under FIFA eligibility rules; some limited exceptions apply. Players may hold more than one non-FIFA nationality.

| No. | Pos. | Nation | Player |

Out: Note: Flags indicate national team as defined under FIFA eligibility rules; some limited exceptions apply. Players may hold more than one non-FIFA nationality.

| No. | Pos. | Nation | Player |
|---|---|---|---|
| 33 | DF | CYP | Constantinos Laifis (loan return to Anorthosis Famagusta) |

=== Anorthosis Famagusta ===
In: Note: Flags indicate national team as defined under FIFA eligibility rules; some limited exceptions apply. Players may hold more than one non-FIFA nationality.

| No. | Pos. | Nation | Player |
|---|---|---|---|
| 25 | MF | ARG | Leandro Becerra (free agent) |
| 34 | DF | CYP | Constantinos Laifis (loan return from Alki Larnaca) |

Out: Note: Flags indicate national team as defined under FIFA eligibility rules; some limited exceptions apply. Players may hold more than one non-FIFA nationality.

| No. | Pos. | Nation | Player |
|---|---|---|---|
| 21 | MF | ROU | George Galamaz (retired) |
| 4 | DF | MNE | Savo Pavicević (to (Serbia) Red Star Belgrade) |
| 9 | FW | CYP | Giannis Okkas (to Ermis Aradippou) |
| 5 | MF | ROU | Dan Alexa (retired) |

=== APOEL ===
In: Note: Flags indicate national team as defined under FIFA eligibility rules; some limited exceptions apply. Players may hold more than one non-FIFA nationality.

| No. | Pos. | Nation | Player |
|---|---|---|---|
| 70 | FW | BRA | César Santin (from (Denmark) F.C. Copenhagen) |
| 14 | DF | GRE | Christos Pipinis (from (Greece) Asteras Tripolis) |
| 30 | MF | ARG | Tomás De Vincenti (on loan from (Greece) Olympiacos) |
| 73 | DF | BRA | Kaká (from (Spain) Deportivo La Coruña) |

Out: Note: Flags indicate national team as defined under FIFA eligibility rules; some limited exceptions apply. Players may hold more than one non-FIFA nationality.

| No. | Pos. | Nation | Player |
|---|---|---|---|
| 23 | FW | POR | Esmaël Gonçalves (loan return to (Portugal) Rio Ave) |
| 7 | FW | CRO | Mario Budimir (to (Greece) Panetolikos) |
| 25 | MF | BRA | Christian (loan return to (Brazil) Grêmio Anápolis) |
| 55 | DF | POR | Hélder Cabral (released) |

=== Apollon Limassol ===
In: Note: Flags indicate national team as defined under FIFA eligibility rules; some limited exceptions apply. Players may hold more than one non-FIFA nationality.

| No. | Pos. | Nation | Player |
|---|---|---|---|
| 99 | FW | COL | Harold Reina (on loan from (Colombia) Deportivo Cali) |
| 17 | MF | ESP | Hugo López (from Enosis Neon Paralimni) |
| 3 | DF | GHA | Razak Nuhu (on loan from (England) Manchester City) |

Out: Note: Flags indicate national team as defined under FIFA eligibility rules; some limited exceptions apply. Players may hold more than one non-FIFA nationality.

| No. | Pos. | Nation | Player |
|---|---|---|---|
| 5 | DF | MKD | Bojan Markovski (released) |
| 21 | DF | ESP | José Catalá (released) |
| 77 | MF | CYP | Dimitris Froxylias (to Ethnikos Achna) |
| 12 | MF | ROU | Ștefan Grigorie (to (Romania) Brașov) |
| 15 | FW | NGA | Eze Vincent Okeuhie (on loan to Nea Salamina) |

=== Aris Limassol ===
In: Note: Flags indicate national team as defined under FIFA eligibility rules; some limited exceptions apply. Players may hold more than one non-FIFA nationality.

| No. | Pos. | Nation | Player |
|---|---|---|---|
| 5 | MF | NED | Tom Daemen (free agent) |
| 83 | MF | BRA | Eduardo Pincelli (from (Brazil) Duque de Caxias) |
| 77 | FW | FIN | Juha Hakola (from (Finland) KuPS) |
| 87 | MF | SWE | Christer Youssef (from (Sweden) Assyriska FF) |

Out: Note: Flags indicate national team as defined under FIFA eligibility rules; some limited exceptions apply. Players may hold more than one non-FIFA nationality.

| No. | Pos. | Nation | Player |
|---|---|---|---|
| 10 | MF | POR | Hugo Moutinho (to AEK Kouklia) |
| 16 | MF | BUL | Dimitar Petkov (to (Moldova) FC Tiraspol) |
| 25 | DF | CYP | Panayiotis Ioannou (to AEK Kouklia) |
| 2 | DF | NED | Rene Osei Kofi (released) |
| 55 | FW | CYP | Neophytos Chrysostomou (to (Greece) Episkopi) |
| 14 | DF | CYP | Marios Ioannou (to ENAD Polis Chrysochous) |
| 23 | MF | CYP | Andreas Theofanous (released) |
| 17 | MF | CYP | Demetris Theofanous (to Omonia Aradippou) |

=== Doxa Katokopias ===
In: Note: Flags indicate national team as defined under FIFA eligibility rules; some limited exceptions apply. Players may hold more than one non-FIFA nationality.

| No. | Pos. | Nation | Player |
|---|---|---|---|
| 12 | GK | ESP | Toni (from (Spain) Xerez CD) |
| 4 | DF | ESP | Dani Tortolero (from (Spain) Sabadell) |
| 99 | FW | POR | Diogo Ramos (free agent) |
| 16 | DF | CPV | Nilson Antonio (free agent) |

Out: Note: Flags indicate national team as defined under FIFA eligibility rules; some limited exceptions apply. Players may hold more than one non-FIFA nationality.

| No. | Pos. | Nation | Player |
|---|---|---|---|
| 17 | DF | POR | Tiago Costa (to (Portugal) Académico de Viseu) |
| 1 | GK | GHA | Richard Kingson (to (Turkey) Balıkesirspor) |
| 33 | DF | CYP | Elias Charalambous (to (Greece) Levadiakos) |
| 10 | MF | POR | Ricardo Fernandes (to Omonia) |
| 9 | FW | BRA | Ricardo Lobo (to (Brazil) Brusque) |
| 8 | MF | ESP | Dani López (on loan to (Spain) Almería B) |

=== Enosis Neon Paralimni ===
In: Note: Flags indicate national team as defined under FIFA eligibility rules; some limited exceptions apply. Players may hold more than one non-FIFA nationality.

| No. | Pos. | Nation | Player |
|---|---|---|---|
| 90 | DF | ITA | Mattia Cinquini (free agent) |
| 77 | MF | FRA | Julien Fernandes (free agent) |
| 23 | MF | ISR | Zion Tzemah (free agent) |
| 27 | FW | MKD | Besart Ibraimi (from (Ukraine) FC Sevastopol) |

Out: Note: Flags indicate national team as defined under FIFA eligibility rules; some limited exceptions apply. Players may hold more than one non-FIFA nationality.

| No. | Pos. | Nation | Player |
|---|---|---|---|
| 20 | FW | CZE | Ondřej Smetana (to (Germany) SV Elversberg) |
| 9 | MF | POR | Ricardo Catchana (to (Portugal) R.D. Águeda) |
| 21 | MF | SVN | Nikola Tolimir (to (Slovenia) Rudar Velenje) |
| 5 | DF | CRO | Igor Gal (released) |
| 24 | DF | CYP | Andreas Constantinou (to Ermis Aradippou) |
| 14 | MF | NGA | Salau Ibrahim (released) |
| 45 | FW | NGA | Monday Shinshima (released) |
| 28 | FW | UKR | Maksym Borovets (to (Ukraine) FC Poltava) |
| 7 | MF | ESP | Hugo López (to Apollon Limassol) |

=== Ermis Aradippou ===
In: Note: Flags indicate national team as defined under FIFA eligibility rules; some limited exceptions apply. Players may hold more than one non-FIFA nationality.

| No. | Pos. | Nation | Player |
|---|---|---|---|
| 17 | MF | GRE | Giannis Taralidis (from Nea Salamina) |
| 24 | DF | CYP | Andreas Constantinou (from Enosis Neon Paralimni) |
| 81 | MF | POR | Manú (free agent) |
| 77 | FW | CYP | Giannis Okkas (from Anorthosis Famagusta) |

Out: Note: Flags indicate national team as defined under FIFA eligibility rules; some limited exceptions apply. Players may hold more than one non-FIFA nationality.

| No. | Pos. | Nation | Player |
|---|---|---|---|
| 6 | FW | POR | Gonçalo Abreu (to (Portugal) A.D. Camacha) |
| 99 | GK | BRA | Elinton Andrade (to (Brazil) Duque de Caxias) |
| 88 | MF | BRA | Diogo Melo (to (Portugal) Portimonense) |
| 4 | DF | CYP | Pantelis Pitsillos (to AEK Kouklia) |
| 13 | FW | CYP | Nicolas Alexiou (to ASIL) |

=== Ethnikos Achna ===
In: Note: Flags indicate national team as defined under FIFA eligibility rules; some limited exceptions apply. Players may hold more than one non-FIFA nationality.

| No. | Pos. | Nation | Player |
|---|---|---|---|
| 80 | MF | CYP | Dimitris Froxylias (from Apollon Limassol) |
| 23 | DF | SVN | Milan Anđelković (free agent) |
| 99 | FW | SVN | Miran Burgič (from (Israel) Hapoel Ramat Gan) |
| 88 | MF | SUI | Fabian Stoller (from (Greece) Platanias) |

Out: Note: Flags indicate national team as defined under FIFA eligibility rules; some limited exceptions apply. Players may hold more than one non-FIFA nationality.

| No. | Pos. | Nation | Player |
|---|---|---|---|
| 17 | FW | GHA | Samad Oppong (released) |
| 53 | DF | CRO | Ernad Skulić (to (Croatia) NK Lučko) |
| 7 | FW | BRA | Liliu (to (Israel) Hapoel Ra'anana) |
| 18 | MF | ESP | Rubén Arroyo (to (Spain) CD Guadalajara) |

=== Nea Salamina ===
In: Note: Flags indicate national team as defined under FIFA eligibility rules; some limited exceptions apply. Players may hold more than one non-FIFA nationality.

| No. | Pos. | Nation | Player |
|---|---|---|---|
| 44 | DF | FRA | Kenny Gillet (free agent) |
| 20 | MF | GRE | Alexandros Kalogeris (on loan from (Greece) Panetolikos) |
| 15 | FW | NGA | Eze Vincent Okeuhie (on loan from Apollon Limassol) |
| 29 | FW | CMR | Justin Mengolo (on loan from Omonia) |

Out: Note: Flags indicate national team as defined under FIFA eligibility rules; some limited exceptions apply. Players may hold more than one non-FIFA nationality.

| No. | Pos. | Nation | Player |
|---|---|---|---|
| 11 | FW | CYP | Charalambos Demosthenous (to Anagennisi Dherynia) |
| 6 | FW | GRE | Giannis Taralidis (to Ermis Aradippou) |
| 9 | FW | HON | Allan Lalín (to (Greece) Paniliakos) |
| 12 | GK | MNE | Srđan Blažić (released) |
| 18 | MF | CYP | Elpidoforos Elia (released) |

=== Omonia ===
In: Note: Flags indicate national team as defined under FIFA eligibility rules; some limited exceptions apply. Players may hold more than one non-FIFA nationality.

| No. | Pos. | Nation | Player |
|---|---|---|---|
| 88 | MF | BRA | Serginho (from (Brazil) Bragantino) |
| 3 | MF | POR | Ricardo Fernandes (from Doxa Katokopias) |
| 22 | FW | ESP | Álex Rubio (from (Spain) Sevilla Atlético) |

Out: Note: Flags indicate national team as defined under FIFA eligibility rules; some limited exceptions apply. Players may hold more than one non-FIFA nationality.

| No. | Pos. | Nation | Player |
|---|---|---|---|
| 60 | MF | CPV | Marco Soares (to (Angola) Primeiro de Agosto) |
| 10 | MF | POR | Bruno Aguiar (released) |
| 5 | DF | BEL | Pieter Mbemba (to (Hungary) Kaposvári Rákóczi) |
| 29 | FW | CMR | Justin Mengolo (on loan to Nea Salamina) |
| 9 | FW | POL | Łukasz Gikiewicz (to (Kazakhstan) FC Tobol) |

== Cypriot Second Division ==
=== B1 Division ===
==== AEP Paphos ====
In: Note: Flags indicate national team as defined under FIFA eligibility rules; some limited exceptions apply. Players may hold more than one non-FIFA nationality.

| No. | Pos. | Nation | Player |

Out: Note: Flags indicate national team as defined under FIFA eligibility rules; some limited exceptions apply. Players may hold more than one non-FIFA nationality.

| No. | Pos. | Nation | Player |

==== Anagennisi Dherynia ====
In: Note: Flags indicate national team as defined under FIFA eligibility rules; some limited exceptions apply. Players may hold more than one non-FIFA nationality.

| No. | Pos. | Nation | Player |
|---|---|---|---|
| 46 | MF | GRE | Stavros Nicolaou (from Othellos Athienou) |
| 90 | FW | CYP | Charalambos Demosthenous (from Nea Salamina) |

Out: Note: Flags indicate national team as defined under FIFA eligibility rules; some limited exceptions apply. Players may hold more than one non-FIFA nationality.

| No. | Pos. | Nation | Player |
|---|---|---|---|
| 8 | FW | MAR | Hicham Chirouf (released) |
| 71 | MF | CYP | Kyriacos Apostolou (to ASIL Lysi) |

==== APEP Pitsilia ====
In: Note: Flags indicate national team as defined under FIFA eligibility rules; some limited exceptions apply. Players may hold more than one non-FIFA nationality.

| No. | Pos. | Nation | Player |

Out: Note: Flags indicate national team as defined under FIFA eligibility rules; some limited exceptions apply. Players may hold more than one non-FIFA nationality.

| No. | Pos. | Nation | Player |
|---|---|---|---|
| 12 | FW | CYP | Nicolas Theodorou (released) |
| 10 | MF | CYP | Andreas Kalos (released) |

==== Ayia Napa ====
In: Note: Flags indicate national team as defined under FIFA eligibility rules; some limited exceptions apply. Players may hold more than one non-FIFA nationality.

| No. | Pos. | Nation | Player |
|---|---|---|---|
| 28 | MF | ARG | Pablo Cortizo (from (Finland) Inter Turku) |
| 21 | MF | SWE | Nino Osmanagic (from (Sweden) Norrby IF) |

Out: Note: Flags indicate national team as defined under FIFA eligibility rules; some limited exceptions apply. Players may hold more than one non-FIFA nationality.

| No. | Pos. | Nation | Player |
|---|---|---|---|
| 7 | MF | NGA | Joshua Izuchukwu (to Nikos & Sokratis Erimis) |

==== Nikos & Sokratis Erimis ====
In: Note: Flags indicate national team as defined under FIFA eligibility rules; some limited exceptions apply. Players may hold more than one non-FIFA nationality.

| No. | Pos. | Nation | Player |
|---|---|---|---|
| 20 | MF | NGA | Joshua Izuchukwu (from Ayia Napa) |
| 21 | MF | POR | Zé Vítor (from (Portugal) União da Madeira) |

Out: Note: Flags indicate national team as defined under FIFA eligibility rules; some limited exceptions apply. Players may hold more than one non-FIFA nationality.

| No. | Pos. | Nation | Player |
|---|---|---|---|
| 11 | FW | CYP | Panayiotis Chailis (released) |
| 10 | MF | CYP | Angelos Perikleous (released) |
| 77 | MF | GRE | Nicolas Tzanetis (released) |

==== Olympiakos Nicosia ====
In: Note: Flags indicate national team as defined under FIFA eligibility rules; some limited exceptions apply. Players may hold more than one non-FIFA nationality.

| No. | Pos. | Nation | Player |

Out: Note: Flags indicate national team as defined under FIFA eligibility rules; some limited exceptions apply. Players may hold more than one non-FIFA nationality.

| No. | Pos. | Nation | Player |
|---|---|---|---|
| 25 | FW | CYP | Diogenis Sergidis (to Ethnikos Latsion) |
| 17 | FW | CYP | Constantinos Kafkarkou (to Adonis Idaliou) |
| 23 | FW | GHA | Godfred Bekoe (to (Bulgaria) Chernomorets Burgas) |

==== Omonia Aradippou ====
In: Note: Flags indicate national team as defined under FIFA eligibility rules; some limited exceptions apply. Players may hold more than one non-FIFA nationality.

| No. | Pos. | Nation | Player |
|---|---|---|---|
| 55 | MF | CYP | Demetris Theofanous (from Aris Limassol) |
| 42 | FW | CPV | José Semedo (from (Albania) KF Tirana) |

Out: Note: Flags indicate national team as defined under FIFA eligibility rules; some limited exceptions apply. Players may hold more than one non-FIFA nationality.

| No. | Pos. | Nation | Player |
|---|---|---|---|
| 11 | FW | CYP | Constantinos Constantinou (to Digenis Oroklinis) |
| 12 | FW | POR | Hardy Pinto-Moreira (released) |

==== Othellos Athienou ====
In: Note: Flags indicate national team as defined under FIFA eligibility rules; some limited exceptions apply. Players may hold more than one non-FIFA nationality.

| No. | Pos. | Nation | Player |
|---|---|---|---|
| 87 | MF | POR | Jorge Neves (from (Portugal) C.D. Fátima) |
| 90 | MF | SVN | Alen Romih (free agent) |

Out: Note: Flags indicate national team as defined under FIFA eligibility rules; some limited exceptions apply. Players may hold more than one non-FIFA nationality.

| No. | Pos. | Nation | Player |
|---|---|---|---|
| 22 | GK | POL | Maciej Zając (to Achyronas Liopetriou) |
| 26 | MF | GRE | Stavros Nicolaou (to Anagennisi Dherynia) |
| 7 | MF | CYP | Nicos Pieri (released) |

=== B2 Division ===
==== AEZ Zakakiou ====
In: Note: Flags indicate national team as defined under FIFA eligibility rules; some limited exceptions apply. Players may hold more than one non-FIFA nationality.

| No. | Pos. | Nation | Player |
|---|---|---|---|
| 54 | FW | CYP | Demetris Kardanas (from Enosis Neon Parekklisia) |
| 55 | FW | GRE | Giorgos Grammatikopoulos (from Ethnikos Assia) |

Out: Note: Flags indicate national team as defined under FIFA eligibility rules; some limited exceptions apply. Players may hold more than one non-FIFA nationality.

| No. | Pos. | Nation | Player |

==== ASIL Lysi ====
In: Note: Flags indicate national team as defined under FIFA eligibility rules; some limited exceptions apply. Players may hold more than one non-FIFA nationality.

| No. | Pos. | Nation | Player |
|---|---|---|---|
| 33 | DF | CYP | Andreas Kyriacou (from Onisilos Sotira) |
| 40 | MF | CYP | Kyriacos Apostolou (from Anagennisi Dherynia) |
| 88 | FW | CYP | Nicolas Alexiou (from Ermis Aradippou) |

Out: Note: Flags indicate national team as defined under FIFA eligibility rules; some limited exceptions apply. Players may hold more than one non-FIFA nationality.

| No. | Pos. | Nation | Player |
|---|---|---|---|
| 31 | DF | CYP | Damianos Damianou (released) |
| 6 | MF | CYP | Panayiotis Onisiforou (released) |

==== Chalkanoras Idaliou ====
In: Note: Flags indicate national team as defined under FIFA eligibility rules; some limited exceptions apply. Players may hold more than one non-FIFA nationality.

| No. | Pos. | Nation | Player |
|---|---|---|---|
| 33 | MF | CYP | Lambros Fylaktou (from ENAD Polis Chrysochous) |
| 99 | DF | CYP | Loukas Stylianou (from PAEEK FC) |

Out: Note: Flags indicate national team as defined under FIFA eligibility rules; some limited exceptions apply. Players may hold more than one non-FIFA nationality.

| No. | Pos. | Nation | Player |
|---|---|---|---|
| 11 | FW | CYP | Adamos Rodosthenous (to PAEEK FC) |
| 6 | DF | CYP | Chysovalantis Panayiotou (to Ethnikos Assia) |
| 17 | FW | CYP | Theodosis Kyprou (to (Greece) AEL Kalloni) |

==== Digenis Voroklinis ====
In: Note: Flags indicate national team as defined under FIFA eligibility rules; some limited exceptions apply. Players may hold more than one non-FIFA nationality.

| No. | Pos. | Nation | Player |
|---|---|---|---|
| 39 | FW | CYP | Constantinos Constantinou (from Omonia Aradippou) |

Out: Note: Flags indicate national team as defined under FIFA eligibility rules; some limited exceptions apply. Players may hold more than one non-FIFA nationality.

| No. | Pos. | Nation | Player |

==== Enosis Neon Parekklisia ====
In: Note: Flags indicate national team as defined under FIFA eligibility rules; some limited exceptions apply. Players may hold more than one non-FIFA nationality.

| No. | Pos. | Nation | Player |

Out: Note: Flags indicate national team as defined under FIFA eligibility rules; some limited exceptions apply. Players may hold more than one non-FIFA nationality.

| No. | Pos. | Nation | Player |
|---|---|---|---|
| 9 | FW | CYP | Demetris Kardanas (to AEZ Zakakiou) |

==== Karmiotissa Polemidion ====
In: Note: Flags indicate national team as defined under FIFA eligibility rules; some limited exceptions apply. Players may hold more than one non-FIFA nationality.

| No. | Pos. | Nation | Player |
|---|---|---|---|
| 37 | FW | ZIM | Edward Mashinya (from Onisilos Sotira) |

Out: Note: Flags indicate national team as defined under FIFA eligibility rules; some limited exceptions apply. Players may hold more than one non-FIFA nationality.

| No. | Pos. | Nation | Player |

==== Onisilos Sotira ====
In: Note: Flags indicate national team as defined under FIFA eligibility rules; some limited exceptions apply. Players may hold more than one non-FIFA nationality.

| No. | Pos. | Nation | Player |
|---|---|---|---|
| 2 | DF | CYP | Thomas Kaouras (from Achyronas Liopetriou) |

Out: Note: Flags indicate national team as defined under FIFA eligibility rules; some limited exceptions apply. Players may hold more than one non-FIFA nationality.

| No. | Pos. | Nation | Player |
|---|---|---|---|
| 9 | FW | ZIM | Edward Mashinya (to Karmiotissa Polemidion) |
| 8 | DF | CYP | Andreas Kyriacou (to ASIL Lysi) |

==== PAEEK FC ====
In: Note: Flags indicate national team as defined under FIFA eligibility rules; some limited exceptions apply. Players may hold more than one non-FIFA nationality.

| No. | Pos. | Nation | Player |
|---|---|---|---|
| 30 | FW | CYP | Adamos Rodosthenous (from Chalkanoras Idaliou) |
| 84 | FW | GRE | Evangelos Chaliotis (free agent) |

Out: Note: Flags indicate national team as defined under FIFA eligibility rules; some limited exceptions apply. Players may hold more than one non-FIFA nationality.

| No. | Pos. | Nation | Player |
|---|---|---|---|
| 8 | FW | COD | Serge Makofo (released) |
| 77 | FW | POR | Bruno Luz (released) |
| 5 | DF | CYP | Loukas Stylianou (to Chalkanoras Idaliou) |
