= Pedro Mendes (footballer, born 1993) =

Portuguese footballer

Personal information
- Full name: Pedro Rafael Amado Mendes
- Date of birth: 6 December 1993 (age 32)
- Place of birth: Barreiro, Portugal
- Height: 1.77 m (5 ft 9 1/2 in)
- Positions: Attacking midfielder; winger

Team information
- Current team: Comércio e Indústria
- Number: 7

Youth career
- 2002–2003: Barreirense
- 2003–2006: Quinta do Conde
- 2006–2007: Benfica
- 2007–2009: Corroios
- 2009–2010: Sporting CP
- 2010–2012: Vitória Setúbal

Senior career*
Years	Team	Apps	(Gls)
2011–2012	Vitória Setúbal	2	(0)
2013–2015	Libolo	3	(0)
2013	→ Mirandela (loan)	14	(0)
2014–2015	→ Moura (loan)	22	(0)
2015–2017	Oriental	32	(0)
2017	Pinhalnovense	5	(0)
2017–2018	Politehnica Iași	22	(3)
2018	Ventspils	7	(1)
2019	Gaz Metan Mediaș	2	(0)
2019	Universitatea Cluj	3	(0)
2020–2021	Southern	8	(0)
2021–2023	Sesimbra		
2023–	Comércio e Indústria		
- * Club domestic league appearances and goals as of 12 August 2024

Pedro Rafael Amado Mendes (born 6 December 1993) is a Portuguese professional footballer who plays as an attacking midfielder for Comércio e Indústria.

== Club career ==
=== Portugal ===
Born in Barreiro, Setúbal District of Angolan descent, Mendes spent the vast majority of his career in the Portuguese lower leagues. He joined Primeira Liga club Vitória F.C. as a 16-year-old, making his Primeira Liga debut with the first team on 6 November 2011 when he came on as a second-half substitute in a 0–0 home draw against Gil Vicente FC, being subsequently praised by manager Bruno Ribeiro.

Mendes also had a brief spell in the Angolan Girabola, with C.R.D. Libolo.

=== Romania ===
On 16 June 2017, Mendes left C.D. Pinhalnovense and joined CSM Politehnica Iași from the Romanian Liga I. He made his debut in the first league game of the season, against CS Universitatea Craiova.

Returned to the country after a very brief spell in Latvia with FK Ventspils, on 7 July 2019 Mendes signed a two-year contract with Liga II side FC Universitatea Cluj. Two months later, however, he left by mutual consent.

=== Hong Kong ===
On 26 October 2020, it was confirmed that Mendes had signed with Hong Kong Premier League club Southern. On 21 May 2021, Mendes left the club due to injury.
