= Luís Cortez =

Portuguese footballer (born 1994)

Personal information
- Full name: Luís Miguel Pereira Cortez
- Date of birth: 18 April 1994 (age 32)
- Place of birth: Setúbal, Portugal
- Height: 1.74 m (5 ft 8 1/2 in)
- Position: Midfielder

Team information
- Current team: Comércio e Indústria
- Number: 14

Youth career
- 2002–2008: Vitória Setúbal
- 2007–2009: Sporting

Senior career*
Years	Team	Apps	(Gls)
2012–2013	Sporting B	1	(0)
2013–2015	Belenenses	0	(0)
2013–2014	→ Torreense (loan)	19	(0)
2014	→ Atlético CP (loan)	6	(0)
2015	→ Casa Pia (loan)	13	(2)
2015	Torreense	2	(0)
2016	Varzim B	6	(0)
2016–2017	Ponte da Barca	28	(6)
2017	Freamunde		
2017–2018	Trofense		
2018–2020	Vitória Setúbal B	23	(1)
2019	Vitória Setúbal	1	(0)
2020–2021	Olhanense		
2021–	Comércio e Indústria		

International career
2010	Portugal U16	11	(3)
2011	Portugal U17	16	(1)
2012	Portugal U18	10	(1)
2013	Portugal U19	5	(0)
- * Club domestic league appearances and goals as of 12 August 2024

Luís Miguel Pereira Cortez (born 18 April 1994) is a Portuguese footballer who plays as a midfielder for Comércio e Indústria.

== Football career ==
On 18 May 2013, Cortez made his professional debut with Sporting B in a 2012–13 Segunda Liga match against Penafiel replacing Tobias Figueiredo (79th minute).
