= Jorge Neves =

Jorge Neves may refer to:

- Jorge Neves (footballer, born 1969), Portuguese football player and coach
- Jorge Neves (footballer, born 1987), Portuguese football player
