= Hugo López (footballer, born 1988) =

Spanish footballer (born 1988)

Personal information
- Full name: Hugo López Martínez
- Date of birth: 15 May 1983 (age 43)
- Place of birth: Gijón, Spain
- Height: 1.75 m (5 ft 9 in)
- Position: Midfielder

Team information
- Current team: Dhofar Club

Youth career
- Colegio Inmaculada
- 2002–2007: Barcelona

Senior career*
Years	Team	Apps	(Gls)
2007–2010	Almería B	59	(14)
2008–2009	→ Sporting Gijón B (loan)	24	(4)
2010–2011	Noja		
2011–2012	Atlético	11	(0)
2012	Slavia Sofia	4	(0)
2013	Ironi Ramat HaSharon	13	(0)
2013	Enosis Neon	15	(2)
2014–2015	Apollon Limassol	35	(10)
2015–2016	Hapoel Kfar Saba	30	(2)
2016–2017	Celaya	13	(1)
2017–2018	Dhofar Club		
2018–2019	Al Hamriyah		
2019	Al-Jabalain		
2019–	Dhofar Club		
- * Club domestic league appearances and goals as of 15:58, 13 May 2021 (UTC)

Hugo López Martínez (born 15 May 1988) is a Spanish professional footballer who plays as a midfielder for Dhofar Club.

== Football career ==
López was born in Gijón, Asturias. While playing for his high school of Colegio de la Inmaculada (Gijón), he was recruited by La Liga club FC Barcelona at the age of 14, remaining with the youth academy for five years. He began his senior career in the fourth division with UD Almería B, then moved to the third with another reserve team, Sporting de Gijón B.

For 2009–10, López returned to the fourth level and Almería's reserves, and also competed in that tier in the following season, with SD Noja. In the 2011 off-season he moved abroad and signed a one-year contract with Atlético Clube de Portugal, freshly promoted to division two.

López played his first official match with the Lisbon club in a League Cup 1–1 away draw against Portimonense SC, on 7 August 2011. He left at the end of the campaign, going on to compete in quick succession in Bulgaria, Israel, Cyprus, Mexico and Oman.

On 23 July 2019, López returned to Dhofar Club.

== Club statistics ==
As of 16 February 2016

Club	Season	League			Cup		Other		Total	
Club	Season	Division	Apps	Goals	Apps	Goals	Apps	Goals	Apps	Goals
Sporting B	2008–09	Segunda División B	24	4	—		2 (Note: Appearances in the Tercera División relegation play-offs)	0	26	4
Atlético	2011–12	Segunda Liga	11	0	2	0	—		13	0
Slavia Sofia	2012–13	A PFG	4	0	1	0	—		5	0
Ironi HaSharon	2012–13	Israeli Premier League	13	0	0	0	—		13	0
Enosis	2013–14	Cypriot First Division	15	2	0	0	—		15	2
Apollon Limassol	2013–14	Cypriot First Division	16	6	4	0	—		20	6
Apollon Limassol	2014–15	Cypriot First Division	19	5	1	0	6 (Note: Appearances in UEFA Europa League)	1	26	6
Apollon Limassol	Total		35	11	5	0	6	1	46	32
Hapoel Kfar Saba	2015–16	Israeli Premier League	23	2	4	0	—		27	2
Career total			125	19	12	0	8	1	145	20
