= Esmaël Gonçalves =

Bissau-Guinean footballer

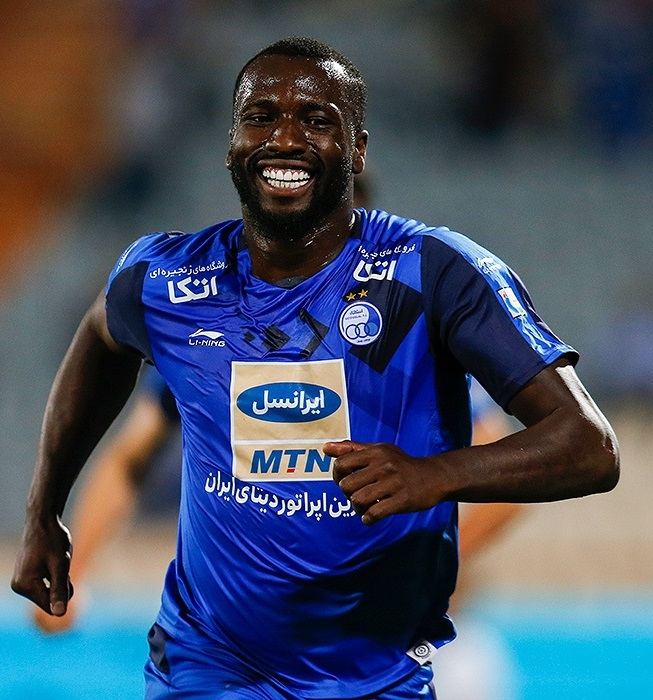
- Gonçalves with Esteghlal in 2019

Personal information
- Full name: Esmaël Ruti Tavares Cruz da Silva Gonçalves
- Date of birth: 25 June 1991 (age 35)
- Place of birth: Bissau, Guinea-Bissau
- Height: 1.84 m (6 ft 0 in)
- Positions: Striker; winger

Team information
- Current team: ASD Virtus Rosarno

Youth career
- 2005–2008: Boavista
- 2008–2011: Nice

Senior career*
Years	Team	Apps	(Gls)
2011–2012	Nice	18	(2)
2012–2015	Rio Ave	18	(1)
2013	→ St Mirren (loan)	12	(3)
2013–2014	→ APOEL (loan)	10	(3)
2014	→ Veria (loan)	15	(2)
2015	→ Anorthosis Famagusta (loan)	15	(9)
2015	Al-Ettifaq	0	(0)
2016–2017	Anorthosis Famagusta	33	(9)
2017–2018	Heart of Midlothian	35	(13)
2018	Pakhtakor Tashkent	21	(16)
2019	Esteghlal	13	(3)
2019–2020	Matsumoto Yamaga	9	(0)
2020–2021	Chennaiyin	16	(4)
2021–2022	Sheikh Russel	8	(2)
2022–2023	Livingston	8	(0)
2023	→ Raith Rovers (loan)	5	(1)
2025–	ASD Virtus Rosarno		

International career
2007–2008	Portugal U17	3	(0)
2018–	Guinea-Bissau	1	(0)
- * Club domestic league appearances and goals as of 8 April 2023

Esmaël Ruti Tavares Cruz da Silva Gonçalves (born 25 June 1991), also known as Isma, is a Bissau-Guinean footballer who plays as a center forward and winger for ASD Virtus Rosarno. He also plays for the Guinea-Bissau national team.

== Club career ==
=== Nice ===
Gonçalves was born in Bissau, the capital city of Guinea-Bissau, but moved to Portugal with his family at the age of three. He began his football career with Boavista. Gonçalves spent three years at the club before venturing to France to sign with Nice after being invited for a trial at the club. Prior to signing with the club, he drew interest from English club Liverpool. Gonçalves spent two years in Nice's youth academy before earning promotion to the club's reserve team in the Championnat de France amateur 2 for the 2010–11 season. Following a successful half season at reserve level, he was called up to the senior team in January 2011 and made his professional debut in a 2–0 defeat to Bordeaux, appearing as a substitute. That was his only senior team appearance of the campaign.

On 30 June 2011, Gonçalves signed his first professional contract, agreeing to a three-year deal until 2014. He was officially promoted to the senior team by manager Eric Roy and assigned the number 24 shirt for the 2011–12 season. He scored twice that season, including the winner in a 4–3 victory at Lyon on the last day, 20 May 2012.

=== Rio Ave ===
On 3 August 2012, Nice confirmed on its official website that Gonçalves would be returning to Portugal to join first division club Rio Ave. Gonçalves had previously expressed his desire to join the Vila do Conde-based club in order to be near his family.

==== St Mirren (loan) ====
On 22 January 2013, Gonçalves signed on loan with Scottish Premier League club St Mirren until the end of the 2012–13 season. The day after signing, he was quoted in the local newspaper Paisley Daily Express that he could be "the next Drogba".

Gonçalves scored his first goal for the club on his debut in the Scottish League Cup semi-final in a 3–2 win over Celtic at Hampden Park, with his being the club's first goal against the Glasgow side since March 2010. Three days later, he made his first Scottish Premier League appearance against Inverness Caledonian Thistle, nutmegging the goalkeeper in a 2–1 victory. In his first Scottish Cup appearance against St Johnstone, Gonçalves scored both goals of a 2–0 victory. He scored another goal against Celtic at St Mirren Park in a 2–1 loss in the sixth round of the Scottish Cup.

On 17 March 2013, Gonçalves played in the Scottish League Cup final against Hearts where he scored the equalising goal and provided an assist for Conor Newton's third in a 3–2 victory Buddies' first League Cup and their first major trophy since 1987. Shortly after scoring, he lifted his jersey, which had the inscription "Forca Fábio Faria" ("Come on Fábio Faria"), dedicating a goal to a player whose career ended after a heart condition. Gonçalves was then booked by the referee.

In a 1–1 draw against Celtic on 31 March, Gonçalves caused controversy when he dived to win the penalty after being fouled by Emilio Izaguirre, with television pictures proving that there was no contact. After the match, he was given a two-match ban by the SFA, after a complaint was issued for that dive, which he accepted. He told BBC Scotland that he would be happy to make a return to St. Mirren in the future. The club was willing to make his transfer permanent, but Rio Ave announced that this would not be the case, and said that such a deal would cost £400,000.

==== APOEL (loan) ====
On 3 July 2013, Gonçalves completed a season-long loan move to Cypriot side APOEL.

He scored on his debut against NK Maribor at GSP Stadium on 31 July, opening the scoring in a 1–1 first leg draw for the third qualifying round of the 2013–14 UEFA Champions League. On 24 October, he scored the equaliser against Bordeaux in APOEL's 2–1 defeat at Stade Chaban-Delmas for the third matchday of the UEFA Europa League group stage. He scored his first league goals in APOEL's 5–0 home victory against AEK Kouklia on 2 December, in a match which Gonçalves managed to score a hat-trick. On 31 December, APOEL terminated his contract by mutual consent.

On 14 January 2014, Veria signed Gonçalves on a one-year loan deal. He scored his first Super League goal in a defeat to PAOK.

=== Heart of Midlothian ===
After a stint in Cyprus with Anorthosis, Gonçalves signed for Scottish Premiership club Heart of Midlothian in January 2017. Hearts paid a transfer fee of about £170,000 for his services and he made his debut in a 4–1 win over Rangers on 1 February. Gonçalves scored 15 goals in 42 appearances for Hearts, until he was sold to Pakhtakor Tashkent for £350,000 in January 2018.

=== Asia ===
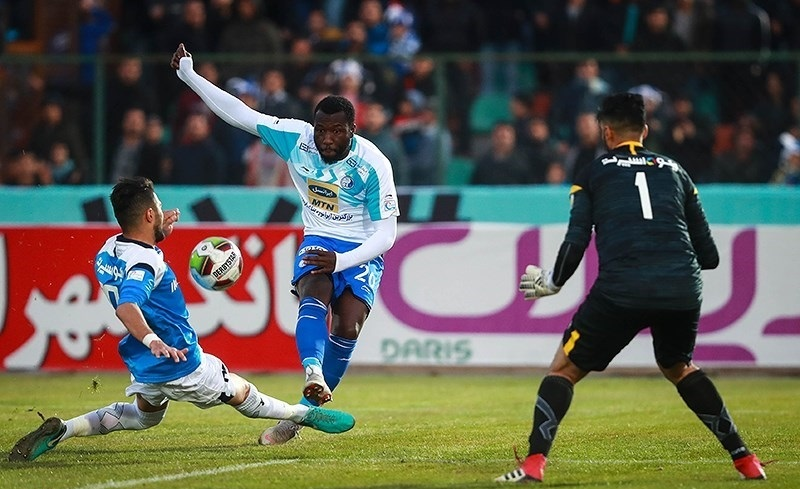
Moment of Isma first goal for Esteghlal against Paykan

Gonçalves signed for Uzbek club Pakhtakor Tashkent in January 2018.

On 26 January 2019, Gonçalves moved to Esteghlal on an 18-month-long contract. He was given the squad shirt number 20. He made his debut for the club on 7 February, in a 4–0 win against Paykan, coming on as an 81st-minute substitute for Morteza Tabrizi. He scored his first goal for Esteghlal in the same game just two minutes after coming on as a substitute. On 1 June, Esteghlal announced Isma's contract was terminated by mutual consent.

Gonçalves signed for Japanese club Matsumoto Yamaga in September 2019. On 23 November, he made his debut for the Japanese side as a substitute in a 1–0 defeat against Yokohama F. Marinos.

On 11 October 2020, Gonçalves joined Indian Super League club Chennaiyin FC on a one-year contract. On 24 November 2020, Gonçalves made his debut in the very first match of the season for Chennnaiyin FC and converted a crucial 26th-minute penalty in a 2–1 win for Chennaiyin over Jamshedpur.

Gonçalves would spend a season with Bangladesh Premier League side Sheikh Russel KC.

=== Livingston ===
On 31 May 2022, Gonçalves returned to Scotland and signed a two-year deal with Scottish Premiership side Livingston. He was loaned to Championship club Raith Rovers on 11 February 2023, and later that day scored in a Scottish Cup tie against Motherwell.

On 1 September 2023 Goncalves was released by Livingston after the two parties reached a mutual agreement over the termination of his contract. The forward failed to score for the club.

He signed for ASD Virtus Rosarno in July 2025.

== International career ==
Though born in Guinea-Bissau, Gonçalves is a naturalised citizen of Portugal. He has represented them at under-17 level. In 2010, he was called up to the Portugal under-20 team to participate in training sessions as the team was preparing for the 2011 FIFA U-20 World Cup. Gonçalves, however, showed up to the camp out of shape and was, ultimately, not considered for the tournament by coach Ilídio Vale.

He earned one cap for Guinea-Bissau on 22 March 2018, starting in a 2–0 friendly loss to Burkina Faso in Limeil-Brévannes, France.

== Career statistics ==
As of match played 8 April 2023

Appearances and goals by club, season and competition
Club	Season	League			National cup (Note: Includes Coupe de France, Taça de Portugal, Scottish Cup, Cypriot Cup, King Cup, Uzbekistan Cup)		League cup (Note: Includes Taça da Liga, Scottish League Cup)		Continental		Other		Total	
Club	Season	Division	Apps	Goals	Apps	Goals	Apps	Goals	Apps	Goals	Apps	Goals	Apps	Goals
Nice	2010–11	Ligue 1	1	0	0	0	0	0	—		—		1	0
Nice	2011–12	Ligue 1	17	2	2	1	0	0	—		—		19	3
Nice	Total		18	2	2	1	0	0	—		—		20	3
Rio Ave	2012–13	Primeira Liga	6	0	1	0	1	0	—		—		8	0
Rio Ave	2013–14	Primeira Liga	0	0	0	0	0	0	—		—		0	0
Rio Ave	2014–15	Primeira Liga	12	1	2	1	3	1	4 (Note: Appearances in UEFA Europa League)	1	—		21	4
Rio Ave	Total		18	1	3	1	4	1	4	1	—		29	4
St Mirren (loan)	2012–13	Scottish Premier League	12	3	2	3	2	2	—		—		16	8
APOEL (loan)	2013–14	Cypriot First Division	10	3	0	0	—		6 (Note: Two appearances and a goal in UEFA Champions League, four appearances and a goal in UEFA Europa League)	2	1 (Note: Appearance in Cypriot Super Cup)	0	17	5
Veria (loan)	2013–14	Super League Greece	15	2	0	0	—		—		—		15	2
Anorthosis Famagusta (loan)	2014–15	Cypriot First Division	15	9	3	2	—		—		—		18	11
Al-Ettifaq (loan)	2015–16	Saudi Pro League	0	0	2	1	0	0	—		—		2	1
Anorthosis Famagusta	2015–16	Cypriot First Division	14	1	1	0	—		—		—		15	1
Anorthosis Famagusta	2016–17	Cypriot First Division	19	8	2	2	—		—		—		21	10
Anorthosis Famagusta	Total		33	9	3	2	—		—		—		36	11
Heart of Midlothian	2016–17	Scottish Premiership	15	7	2	1	0	0	—		—		17	8
Heart of Midlothian	2017–18	Scottish Premiership	20	6	1	0	4	1	—		—		25	7
Heart of Midlothian	Total		35	13	3	1	4	1	—		—		42	15
Pakhtakor Tashkent	2018	Uzbekistan Super League	21	12	4	2	—		—		10	4	35	18
Esteghlal	2018–19	Persian Gulf Pro League	13	3	0	0	—		5 (Note: Appearances in AFC Champions League)	0	—		18	3
Matsumoto Yamaga	2019	J1 League	3	0	0	0	0	0	—		—		3	0
Matsumoto Yamaga	2020	J2 League	6	0	0	0	0	0	—		—		6	0
Matsumoto Yamaga	Total		9	0	0	0	0	0	—		—		9	0
Chennaiyin	2020–21	Indian Super League	16	4	0	0	—		—		—		16	4
Sheikh Russel	2021–22	Bangladesh Premier League	8	2	0	0	—		—		—		8	2
Livingston	2022–23	Scottish Premiership	8	0	0	0	4	0	—		—		12	0
Raith Rovers (loan)	2022–23	Scottish Championship	5	1	2	1	—		—		1 (Note: Appearance in Scottish Challenge Cup)	0	8	2
Career total			236	64	24	14	14	4	15	3	12	4	301	89

== Honours ==
St Mirren

- Scottish League Cup: 2012–13

APOEL

- Cypriot Super Cup: 2013

Individual

- Uzbekistan Super League top goalscorer: 2018
