= Hélder Cabral =

Portuguese footballer

Personal information
- Full name: Hélder José Vaz Cabral
- Date of birth: 7 May 1984 (age 42)
- Place of birth: Peniche, Portugal
- Height: 1.80 m (5 ft 11 in)
- Position: Left back

Team information
- Current team: Comércio e Indústria
- Number: 6

Youth career
- 1994–2000: Peniche
- 2000–2001: Sporting CP
- 2001–2003: Vitória Guimarães

Senior career*
Years	Team	Apps	(Gls)
2003–2007	Vitória Guimarães	21	(0)
2003–2004	→ Os Sandinenses (loan)	35	(7)
2004–2005	→ Valdevez (loan)	21	(0)
2006	→ Moreirense (loan)	13	(2)
2007–2008	Estrela Amadora	19	(1)
2008	Vejle	4	(0)
2009–2013	Académica	72	(1)
2013–2014	APOEL	7	(0)
2014–2015	Vitória Setúbal	17	(0)
2015–2016	Omonia	0	(0)
2017	Olhanense	10	(0)
2017–2018	Lusitano de Évora		
2018–2019	Vendas Novas		
2019–	Comércio e Indústria		
- * Club domestic league appearances and goals as of 12 August 2024

Hélder José Vaz Cabral (born 7 May 1984) is a Portuguese professional footballer who plays as a left back for Comércio e Indústria.

== Club career ==
Born in Peniche, Cabral played youth football for three clubs, spending six years in local Grupo Desportivo de Peniche's system and entering it at the age of ten. He played his last two years as a junior with Vitória SC, going on to start his senior career in the lower leagues on loan.

Returning to Guimarães in the 2005 summer, Cabral played the first part of the 2005–06 season – being subsequently loaned to Moreirense F.C. in the second division – and the entire 2006–07 with the first team, leaving in June 2007 to fellow Primeira Liga club C.F. Estrela da Amadora: he scored his only goal of the campaign on 6 January 2008 in a 4–1 home win against his former employer, helping the Lisbon outskirts side narrowly avoid relegation after finishing 13th.

In January 2009, after an unassuming spell in Denmark with Vejle Boldklub, Cabral returned to his country and joined Académica de Coimbra. He was irregularly played during his spell, but started as the team won the 2012 edition of the Portuguese Cup – the first in 73 years – after defeating Sporting Clube de Portugal 1–0 in the final.

On 7 August 2013, Cabral signed a one-year deal with the option of a further season with APOEL FC from Cyprus. He made his debut for his new team on 19 September, coming on as an 86th-minute substitute in a 0–0 away draw against Maccabi Tel Aviv F.C. in the group stage of the UEFA Europa League.

On 29 January 2014, APOEL terminated Cabral's contract by mutual consent.

== International career ==
Despite being born in Portugal, Cabral qualified to play for Cape Verde through his parents. In a January 2011 interview he added he would also like to represent the Portugal national team in the future, but preferred to "concentrate on (his) club duties for now".

== Honours ==
Académica

- Taça de Portugal: 2011–12

APOEL

- Cypriot First Division: 2013–14
- Cypriot Super Cup: 2013
