= Maximiliano Oliva =

Argentine footballer (born 1990)

Personal information
- Full name: Maximiliano Fernando Oliva
- Date of birth: 16 March 1990 (age 36)
- Place of birth: Gobernador Crespo, Argentina
- Height: 1.71 m (5 ft 7 in)
- Position: Left-back

Youth career
- River Plate

Senior career*
Years	Team	Apps	(Gls)
2006–2012	River Plate	2	(0)
2008–2010	→ Tigre (loan)	25	(0)
2010–2012	→ Indep. Rivadavia (loan)	30	(1)
2012–2013	San Martín SJ	2	(0)
2013–2014	Aris Limassol	29	(0)
2014–2015	Estudiantes	5	(0)
2015–2016	Crucero del Norte	12	(0)
2016–2018	Dinamo București	20	(0)
2018	→ Poli Timișoara (loan)	11	(0)
2018–2019	Enosis Neon Paralimni	25	(0)
2019–2020	Alvarado	9	(0)
2021	Boca Unidos	13	(1)
2022–2023	Tristán Suárez	20	(0)

International career
2006	Argentina U-17	13	(2)
2008–2010	Argentina U-20	2	(0)
- * Club domestic league appearances and goals as of 17:01, 7 April 2024 (UTC)

Maximiliano Fernando Oliva (born 16 March 1990 in Gobernador Crespo, Santa Fe), is an Argentine footballer who plays as a left-back.

Oliva made his debut for River Plate as a 17-year-old in a home loss to Colón on 24 November 2007. In 2008, he was part of River Plate's squad that won the Clausura tournament, but he did not feature in any of the games.

In January 2009 Oliva was selected to join the Argentina under-20 squad for the 2009 South American Youth Championship in Venezuela.

== Honours ==
=== Club ===
Dinamo București

- Cupa Ligii: 2016–17
