= Dragan Žarković =

Serbian footballer

Personal information
- Full name: Dragan Žarković
- Date of birth: 16 April 1986 (age 40)
- Place of birth: Belgrade, SFR Yugoslavia
- Height: 1.88 m (6 ft 2 in)
- Position: Centre-back

Youth career
- Obilić

Senior career*
Years	Team	Apps	(Gls)
2004–2005	Mladi Obilić	30	(4)
2005–2006	Grafičar Beograd	29	(10)
2006–2011	BSK Borča	127	(10)
2011–2012	Shahrdari Tabriz	27	(0)
2012–2013	Hajduk Kula	1	(0)
2012–2013	→ Novi Pazar (loan)	11	(0)
2013	Târgu Mureș	4	(0)
2013–2015	Ermis Aradippou	44	(2)
2015–2016	Nea Salamina	27	(0)
2016–2017	Napredak Kruševac	0	(0)
2017	→ Radnik Surdulica (loan)	12	(0)
2017–2018	Gostaresh Foolad	8	(0)
2018–2019	Radnik Surdulica	27	(0)
2019	OFK Bačka	14	(2)
2019	Ermis Aradippou	0	(0)
2020	OFK Bačka	0	(0)
Total		361	(28)
- * Club domestic league appearances and goals as of 14:12, 26 April 2019 (UTC)

Dragan Žarković (Serbian Cyrillic: Драган Жарковић; born 16 April 1986) is a Serbian football defender.

== Youth years ==
Born in Belgrade, SR Serbia, Žarković started playing and have spent 10 years in youth ranks of in his hometown club FK Obilić.

== Senior career ==
He turned professional in Obilić, but has gained first experience in Mladi Obilić, playing in third rank of Serbian football. Next year Žarković has spent in another Belgrade based 3rd league club Grafičar, where he has attracted attention to newly promoted second league club BSK Borča. With BSK, he has earned promotion to Serbian major league in 2010. In season 2011–12 he played in Shahrdari Tabriz in Azadegan League. After one year abroad, his new destination was his homeland; after two matches for FK Hajduk Kula he went on to Novi Pazar. After parting with Novi Pazar, Žarković has wore jersey of Târgu Mureș in second league of Romania for six months.

On 28 June 2019, Žarković returned to Cypriot club Ermis Aradippou FC. However, he was released on 12 November 2019 for personal reasons.
