= João Guilherme (footballer, born 1986) =

Brazilian footballer (born 1986)

Personal information
- Full name: João Guilherme Leme Amorim
- Date of birth: 21 April 1986 (age 40)
- Place of birth: Bilac, Brazil
- Height: 1.85 m (6 ft 1 in)
- Position: Centre-back

Youth career
- 2004–2005: Internacional

Senior career*
Years	Team	Apps	(Gls)
2005–2007	Internacional	16	(1)
2008–2013	Marítimo	109	(5)
2013–2016	APOEL	75	(4)
2016–2017	Al-Fateh	5	(0)
2017	Bangu	5	(1)
2018	Cruzeiro RS	11	(0)
2018	Volta Redonda	10	(0)
2020	Brasil de Farroupilha	3	(0)
Total		224	(11)

International career
2003	Brazil U17	6	(0)
- * Club domestic league appearances and goals

João Guilherme Leme Amorim (born 21 April 1986) is a Brazilian former professional footballer who plays as a centre-back.

== Club career ==
=== Internacional ===
João Guilherme started his career with Brazilian powerhouse Internacional where he played 16 games, and scored 1 goal.

=== Marítimo ===
In January 2008, Guilherme was officially announced as the first reinforcement of the year of Portuguese Liga club C.S. Marítimo, after completing a deal worth €200,000. He was signed along with Internacional teammate Bruno Grassi, both of whom joined up with former teammates Marcelo Boeck, Ediglê and Márcio Mossoró, who all signed for Marítimo earlier in the season from Internacional. He played for Maritimo from 2008 until 2013, appearing in 109 games and scoring 5 goals.

=== APOEL ===
On 14 June 2013, after six Portuguese Liga seasons, he signed a two-year contract with APOEL from Cyprus. He made his APOEL debut against NK Maribor at GSP Stadium on 31 July 2013, in a 1–1 first leg draw for the third qualifying round of the 2013–14 UEFA Champions League. He scored his first official goal for APOEL on 2 September 2013, in his team's 3–0 home win against Enosis Neon Paralimni for the Cypriot First Division. During the 2013–14 season, he appeared in four 2013–14 UEFA Europa League group stage matches for APOEL and won all the titles in Cyprus, the Cypriot League, the Cypriot Cup and the Cypriot Super Cup.

The next season, he appeared in five group stage matches in APOEL's 2014–15 UEFA Champions League campaign. On 19 December 2014, Guilherme signed a two-year contract extension with APOEL, running until June 2017. On 14 June 2016, one month after he won his third consecutive Cypriot First Division title with the club, João Guilherme's contract with APOEL was mutually terminated.

== International career ==
João Guilherme was the captain of the Brazil under-17 team that won the 2003 FIFA U-17 World Cup, appearing in all Brazil's matches and helping his team to win the trophy.

== Career statistics ==
As of 15 May 2016

Appearances and goals by club, season and competition
Club	Season	League			National cup		League cup		Continental		Other		Total	
Club	Season	Division	Apps	Goals	Apps	Goals	Apps	Goals	Apps	Goals	Apps	Goals	Apps	Goals
Marítimo	2007–08	Primeira Liga	3	0	0	0	0	0	—		—		3	0
Marítimo	2008–09	Primeira Liga	30	0	1	0	3	0	2 (Note: Appearances in UEFA Europa League)	0	—		36	0
Marítimo	2009–10	Primeira Liga	26	1	1	0	1	0	—		—		28	1
Marítimo	2010–11	Primeira Liga	14	1	0	0	1	0	6 (Note: Appearances in UEFA Europa League)	0	—		21	1
Marítimo	2011–12	Primeira Liga	24	1	3	0	4	1	—		—		31	2
Marítimo	2012–13	Primeira Liga	12	2	1	0	2	0	9 (Note: Appearances in UEFA Europa League)	0	—		24	2
Marítimo	Total		109	5	6	0	11	1	17	0	—		143	6
APOEL	2013–14	Cypriot First Division	28	3	4	0	—		8 (Note: Appearances in UEFA Champions League and UEFA Europa League)	0	1 (Note: Appearances in Cypriot Super Cup)	0	41	3
APOEL	2014–15	Cypriot First Division	26	0	5	0	—		9 (Note: Appearances in UEFA Champions League)	0	1	0	41	0
APOEL	2015–16	Cypriot First Division	21	1	3	0	—		5	0	1	0	30	1
APOEL	Total		75	4	12	0	—		22	0	3	0	112	4
Career total			184	9	18	0	11	1	39	0	3	0	255	10

== Honours ==
APOEL

- Cypriot First Division: 2013–14, 2014–15, 2015–16
- Cypriot Cup: 2013–14, 2014–15
- Cypriot Super Cup: 2013

Brazil U17

- FIFA Under-17 World Cup: 2003
