= Toni Lechuga =

Spanish footballer

Personal information
- Full name: Antonio Lechuga Mateos
- Date of birth: 15 February 1988 (age 38)
- Place of birth: Jerez de la Frontera, Spain
- Height: 1.93 m (6 ft 4 in)
- Position: Goalkeeper

Youth career
- Xerez

Senior career*
Years	Team	Apps	(Gls)
2006–2009	Xerez B	64	(0)
2008–2013	Xerez	15	(0)
2014	Doxa	16	(0)
2014–2015	Guadalajara	13	(0)
2015–2017	Burgos	64	(0)
2018	Arcos	10	(0)
2018–2019	Alcobendas Sport	40	(0)
2020	Torrijos	10	(0)
2020	Internacional Madrid	0	(0)
2021	Santfeliuenc	4	(0)
2021–2022	Jaén	10	(0)
- * Club domestic league appearances and goals

Antonio "Toni" Lechuga Mateos (born 15 February 1988) is a Spanish former professional footballer who played as a goalkeeper.

== Club career ==
Born in Jerez de la Frontera, Province of Cádiz, Toni started his career with hometown's Xerez CD, playing several seasons with the reserves, the first being 2006–07 in the Tercera División. In late 2008 he was called up to train with the first team, but again only appeared officially for the B side.

Toni served as third-choice – backing up Renan and Chema in the 2009–10 campaign and playing understudy to Chema and Francisco Lledó in 2010–11 – in the following years. On 6 April 2011 he renewed his contract with the Andalusians, extending his link to the club until 2014.

On 20 May 2012, Toni made his debut as a professional, appearing in a 3–2 Segunda División home win against Deportivo de La Coruña. He was promoted to backup the next season, starting the first seven matches as it ended in relegation.

Toni spent the 2013–14 campaign in the Cypriot First Division with Doxa Katokopias FC. He returned to his country subsequently, seeing out his career in the lower leagues and amateur football.

== Club statistics ==
As of 23 September 2015

Club	Season	League			Cup		Continental		Total	
Club	Season	Division	Apps	Goals	Apps	Goals	Apps	Goals	Apps	Goals
Xerez	2007–08	Segunda División	0	0	0	0	—		0	0
Xerez	2008–09	Segunda División	0	0	0	0	—		0	0
Xerez	2009–10	La Liga	0	0	0	0	—		0	0
Xerez	2010–11	Segunda División	0	0	0	0	—		0	0
Xerez	2011–12	Segunda División	3	0	0	0	—		3	0
Xerez	2012–13	Segunda División	12	0	0	0	—		12	0
Xerez	Total		15	0	0	0	—		15	0
Doxa	2013–14	Cypriot First Division	16	0	5	0	—		21	0
Guadalajara	2014–15	Segunda División B	13	0	0	0	—		13	0
Burgos	2015–16	Segunda División B	5	0	0	0	—		5	0
Career total			33	0	5	0	0	0	38	0
