= Kaká (footballer, born 1981) =

Brazilian footballer

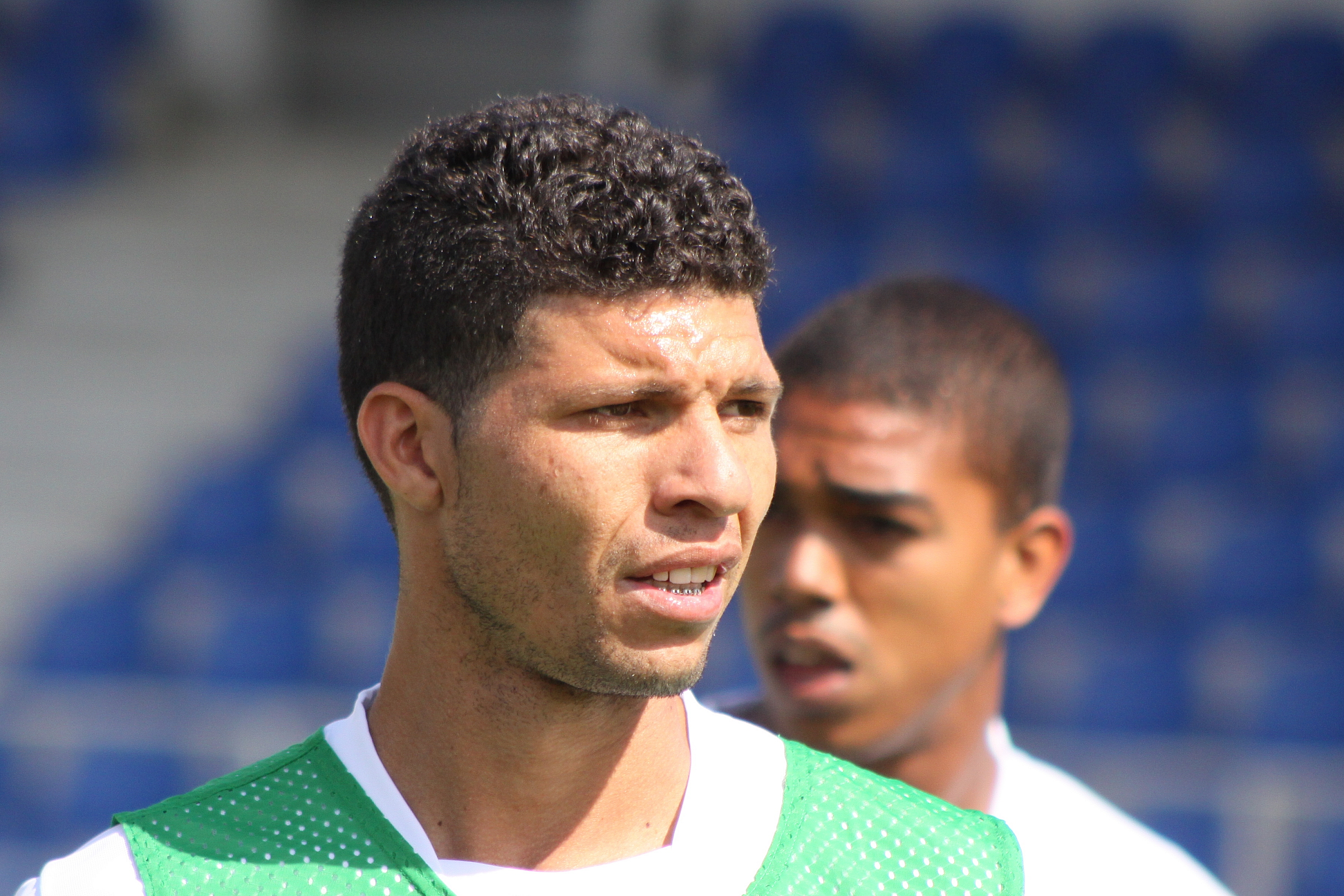
- Kaká in 2009

Personal information
- Full name: Claudiano Bezerra da Silva
- Date of birth: 16 May 1981 (age 45)
- Place of birth: São José do Belmonte, Brazil
- Height: 1.87 m (6 ft 2 in)
- Position: Centre-back

Senior career*
Years	Team	Apps	(Gls)
2002–2006	União Bandeirante		
2003	→ São Caetano (loan)	0	(0)
2003	→ Ituiutaba (loan)		
2004–2005	→ Luverdense (loan)		
2006	→ Jaciara (loan)		
2006–2008	Académica	52	(1)
2008–2012	Hertha BSC	15	(0)
2010	→ Omonia (loan)	8	(0)
2011	→ Braga (loan)	12	(0)
2011–2012	→ APOEL (loan)	20	(0)
2012–2013	Videoton	8	(0)
2013	→ Deportivo La Coruña (loan)	6	(0)
2013–2014	Deportivo La Coruña	11	(0)
2014–2015	APOEL	26	(3)
2015–2017	Tondela	45	(3)
2017–2018	Varzim	6	(0)
2018–2020	Anadia	41	(2)
- * Club domestic league appearances and goals as of 19 January 2020

Claudiano Bezerra da Silva (born 16 May 1981), known as Kaká (Portuguese pronunciation: [kaˈka]), is a Brazilian former professional footballer who played as a centre-back.

== Club career ==
Kaká was born in São José do Belmonte, Pernambuco. Until 2006 he was on contract to União Bandeirante Futebol Clube, also being loaned to several modest Brazilian clubs. For 2006–07 he made the move to Europe, joining Portuguese side Académica de Coimbra and being an undisputed starter in his second season in the Primeira Liga (all 30 games played, 2,700 minutes of action), as they finished in 12th position.

In May 2008, Kaká signed with Bundesliga's Hertha BSC for €1.9 million. He made his debut in the competition on 17 August, playing the full 90 minutes in a 2–0 away win against Eintracht Frankfurt, and finished his debut campaign with 12 matches. After only appearing twice for the Berlin-based team in the first half of 2009–10 – the season eventually ended in relegation – he was loaned to AC Omonia in Cyprus on 31 January 2010, helping it win the First Division title for the first time in seven years.

Kaká continued to be rarely played at Hertha after his return and, in another winter transfer window move, returned to Portugal and joined S.C. Braga, yet on loan. With the Minho club he established himself as a regular, finishing the 2010–11 season with 20 competitive appearances, including eight in the team's UEFA Europa League run to the final, with the player taking the field in the decisive game against FC Porto (1–0 loss).

At the end of the season, Kaká returned to Hertha. On the last day of the 2011 summer transfer window he was once again loaned, this time to Cypriot champions and UEFA Champions League contenders APOEL FC. Kaká made his debut in the Champions League on 19 October 2011 in a 1–1 draw with Porto at the Estádio do Dragão. He added a further three appearances in the competition as they eventually became the first Cypriot club to reach both the knockout stages and the quarter-finals for the first time ever.

On 28 August 2012, Kaká signed with Hungarian side Videoton FC. In late January of the following year he moved to La Liga, loaned to Deportivo de La Coruña, and the move was made permanent in July.

Kaká signed an 18-month contract with APOEL on 29 January 2014, returning to his former club after one and a half years. He made his debut on 9 February, coming on as an 84th-minute substitute in a 2–1 league home victory over Apollon Limassol, and scored his first goal one week later in his team's 3–1 defeat of Alki Larnaca FC.

On 17 May 2014, in the league title decider between AEL Limassol and APOEL, Kaká suffered a head injury when he was hit by a firecracker launched by the opposition's fans; the match was abandoned in the 51st minute when the score was still at 0–0, and replayed 15 days later. He eventually helped his team to the national championship, adding the domestic cup.

Kaká returned to Portugal in its top tier in the 2015 off-season, joining newly promoted C.D. Tondela.

== Club statistics ==
As of 9 October 2015

Club	Season	League			Cup		League Cup		Continental		Other		Total		
Club	Season	Division	Apps	Goals	Apps	Goals	Apps	Goals	Apps	Goals	Apps	Goals	Apps	Goals	
Académica	2006–07	Primeira Liga	22	0	4	0	—		—		—		26	0	
Académica	2007–08	Primeira Liga	30	1	1	0	1	0	—		—		32	1	
Académica	Total		52	1	5	0	1	0	—		—		58	1	
Hertha BSC	2008–09	Bundesliga	12	0	0	0	—		7 (Note: Appearances in UEFA Europa League)	0	—		19	0	
Hertha BSC	2009–10	Bundesliga	2	0	0	0	—		2	0	—		4	0	
Hertha BSC	2010–11	2. Bundesliga	1	0	0	0	—		—		—		1	0	
Hertha BSC	Total		15	0	0	0	—		9	0	—		24	0	
Omonia	2009–10	Cypriot First Division	8	0	0	0	—		—		—		8	0	
Braga	2010–11	Primeira Liga	12	0	0	0	0	0	8	0	—		20	0	
APOEL	2011–12	Cypriot First Division	20	0	1	0	—		4 (Note: Appearances in UEFA Champions League)	0	—		25	0	
Videoton	2012–13	Nemzeti Bajnokság I	8	0	1	0	3	0	1	0	—		13	0	
Deportivo	2012–13	La Liga	6	0	0	0	—		—		—		6	0	
Deportivo	2013–14	Segunda División	11	0	1	0	—		—		—		12	0	
Deportivo	Total		17	0	1	0	—		—		—		18	0	
APOEL	2013–14	Cypriot First Division	6	3	4	0	—		—		—		10	3	
APOEL	2014–15	Cypriot First Division	20	0	4	0	—		0	0	1 (Note: Appearance in Cypriot Super Cup)	0	25	0	
APOEL	Total		26	3	8	0	—		0	0	1	0	35	3	
Tondela	2015–16	Primeira Liga	7	1	0	0	—		—		—		7	1	
Tondela	Career total			164	5	16	0	4	0	22	0	1	0	207	5

== Honours ==
Omonia

- Cypriot First Division: 2009–10

Braga

- UEFA Europa League runner-up: 2010–11

APOEL

- Cypriot First Division: 2013–14, 2014–15
- Cypriot Cup: 2013–14, 2014–15
