= Jorge Neves (footballer, born 1987) =

Portuguese footballer

Personal information
- Full name: Jorge Filipe Pereira Neves
- Date of birth: 17 September 1987 (age 39)
- Place of birth: Fátima, Portugal
- Height: 1.77 m (5 ft 9 1/2 in)
- Position: Midfielder

Youth career
- 2000–2004: CADE
- 2004–2006: União Leiria

Senior career*
Years	Team	Apps	(Gls)
2006–2012	Fátima	113	(3)
2012–2013	Anagennisi Dherynia	23	(1)
2013	Fátima	11	(1)
2014	Othellos Athienou	14	(0)
2014–2015	União Leiria	10	(0)
2015–2018	Fátima	61	(2)
- * Club domestic league appearances and goals as of 20 May 2018

Jorge Filipe Pereira Neves (born 17 September 1987 in Fátima) is a Portuguese footballer who plays as a midfielder.
