= Diogo Ramos =

Portuguese footballer

Personal information
- Full name: Diogo Emanuel Alves Ramos
- Date of birth: 8 November 1986 (age 40)
- Place of birth: Grijó, Portugal
- Height: 1.83 m (6 ft 0 in)
- Position: Attacking midfielder

Team information
- Current team: Onisilos Sotira
- Number: 77

Youth career
- 1996–1999: AD Grijó
- 1999–2005: Porto
- 2001–2002: → Padroense (loan)

Senior career*
Years	Team	Apps	(Gls)
2005–2008	Freamunde	47	(16)
2008–2010	Gloria Bistriţa	20	(4)
2012–2013	Freamunde	41	(9)
2014–2015	Doxa	46	(14)
2015–2017	Freamunde	75	(17)
2017–2018	Varzim	32	(2)
2018–2019	Olympiakos Nicosia	28	(28)
2019–2020	Karmiotissa	20	(17)
2020–	Onisilos Sotira		
- * Club domestic league appearances and goals as of 14:24, 21 May 2020 (UTC)

Diogo Emanuel Alves Ramos (born 8 November 1986 in Grijó (Vila Nova de Gaia), Porto District) is a Portuguese footballer who plays for Cypriot club Onisilos Sotira 2014 as an attacking midfielder.
