= Christos Pipinis =

Greek footballer (born 1984)

Personal information
- Date of birth: 1 November 1984 (age 42)
- Place of birth: Athens, Greece
- Height: 1.84 m (6 ft 1/2 in)
- Position: Left back

Team information
- Current team: Ilisiakos
- Number: 3

Senior career*
Years	Team	Apps	(Gls)
2003–2006	Akratitos	45	(0)
2006–2007	Veria	11	(0)
2007–2009	Panserraikos	44	(0)
2009–2010	Thrasyvoulos	31	(1)
2010–2013	Asteras Tripolis	50	(2)
2014	APOEL	10	(0)
2014–2015	AEL Kalloni	12	(0)
2015–2016	Apollon Smyrnis	14	(0)
2016–	Ilisiakos		

International career
2012–2014	Greece	1	(0)
- * Club domestic league appearances and goals as of 3 October 2015

Christos Pipinis (Greek: Χρήστος Πιπίνης; born 1 November 1984) is a Greek professional footballer who lastly played for Apollon Smyrnis in the Super League Greece, as a left defender.

== Career ==
=== Greece ===
Born in Athens, Pipinis began playing football with local side Akratitos. He moved on to Veria, Panserraikos and Thrasyvoulos before joining Asteras Tripolis on a free transfer in June 2010.

=== APOEL ===
On 1 January 2014, aged 29, Pipinis moved abroad for the first time and signed an 18-month contract with Cypriot club APOEL. He made his debut on 4 January 2014, coming on as a 74th-minute substitute in APOEL's 2–2 home draw against AEL Limassol for the Cypriot First Division and scored his first official goal on 9 April 2014, in his team's 4–0 away win against Doxa Katokopias for the quarter-finals of the Cypriot Cup. Pipinis won his first ever career title, after APOEL won Ermis Aradippou 2–0 in the Cypriot Cup final and lifted the trophy. Ten days later, Pipinis won also the Cypriot First Division after APOEL's 1–0 away victory against AEL Limassol in the title deciding match of the competition. On 1 June 2014, APOEL terminated Pipinis' contract with the club by mutual consent. On 3 October 2015, Pipinis terminated his contract with Kalloni by mutual consent.

== Honours ==
APOEL

- Cypriot First Division: 2013–14
- Cypriot Cup: 2013–14
