= União Futebol Comércio e Indústria =

Portuguese football club

Comércio e Indústria
- Full name: União Futebol Comércio e Indústria
- Short name: Comércio e Indústria
- Founded: 24 June 1917; 108 years ago
- Ground: Campo da Bela Vista
- Capacity: 1,500
- President: Vitor Augusto
- Head coach: Luís Manuel
- League: Campeonato de Portugal (Série D)
- Website: http://ufci.pt/

União Futebol Comércio e Indústria is a football club based in Setúbal, Portugal. They currently compete in the Campeonato de Portugal, the fourth level of the Portuguese football league system.

The club was founded in 1917 under the name União dos Empregados do Comércio e Indústria de Setúbal, by Mário Gonçalves Pacheco, António Gonçalves Pacheco, José Mendes Nunes, Ildefonso Garrudo and Francisco dos Santos.

== Honours ==
- AF Setúbal – First Division

Winners (2): 1977–78, 1992–93

- AF Setúbal – Second Division

Winners (2): 2004–05, 2018–19

== Notable players ==
- José Mourinho (1985–1987)
- Albert Meyong (2020–2021)
