= 2013–14 Cypriot Fourth Division =

Cypriot Fourth Division
- Season: 2013–14
- Champions: EN Ypsona (1st title)
- Promoted: EN Ypsona; Amathus
- Relegated: OXEN; Kissos
- Matches played: 210
- Goals scored: 636 (3.03 per match)
- Top goalscorer: Andreas Ioannou (19 goals)

The 2013–14 Cypriot Fourth Division was the 29th season of the Cypriot fourth-level football league. Enosi Neon Ypsona won their 1st title.

== Format ==
Fifteen teams participated in the 2013–14 Cypriot Fourth Division. All teams played against each other twice, once at their home and once away. The team with the most points at the end of the season crowned champions. The first two teams were promoted to the 2014–15 Cypriot Third Division and the last two teams were relegated to regional leagues.

=== Point system ===
Teams received three points for a win, one point for a draw and zero points for a loss.

== Changes from previous season ==
Teams promoted to 2013–14 Cypriot Third Division

- MEAP Nisou
- Finikas Ayias Marinas Chrysochous
- THOI Lakatamia
- Konstantios & Evripidis Trachoniou

Teams relegated from 2012–13 Cypriot Third Division

- Frenaros FC
- Atromitos Yeroskipou ^{1}

^{1}Atromitos Yeroskipou withdrew from the 2013–14 Cypriot Fourth Division.

Teams promoted from regional leagues

- Digenis Akritas Ypsona
- Enosis Kokkinotrimithia
- Lenas Limassol
- Olympias Lympion
- Omonia Oroklinis
- OXEN Peristeronas

Teams relegated to regional leagues

- AEN Ayiou Georgiou Vrysoullon-Acheritou
- Dynamo Pervolion

== Stadia and locations ==
2013–14 Cypriot Fourth Division

Club	Venue
Amathus Ayiou Tychona	Germasogeia Municipal Stadium
ASPIS Pylas	Pyla Municipal Stadium
Digenis Akritas Ypsona	Stelios Chari Stadium
Elpida Astromeriti	Akaki Municipal Stadium
Enosi Neon Ypsona	Stelios Chari Stadium
Enosis Kokkinotrimithia	Kokkinotrimithia Municipal Stadium
Iraklis Gerolakkou	Kykkos Stadium
Kissos Kissonergas	Kissonerga Municipal Stadium
Livadiakos/Salamina Livadion	Ayia Pasaskevi Livadion Municipality Stadium
Lenas Limassol	Trachoni Municipal Stadium
Olympias Lympion	Olympias Lympion Stadium
Omonia Oroklinis	Oroklini Municipal Stadium
OXEN Peristeronas	Katokopia Peristerona Stadium
P.O. Xylotymvou	Xylotympou Municipal Stadium
Frenaros FC	Frenaros Municipal Stadium

== League standings ==
Pos	Team	Pld	W	D	L	GF	GA	GD	Pts	Promotion or relegation
1	Enosi Neon Ypsona (C, P)	28	21	3	4	67	27	+40	66	Promoted to Cypriot Third Division
2	Amathus Ayiou Tychona (P)	28	20	5	3	77	20	+57	65	Promoted to Cypriot Third Division
3	ASPIS Pylas	28	20	4	4	68	27	+41	64	
4	Iraklis Gerolakkou	28	16	4	8	55	25	+30	52	
5	Digenis Akritas Ypsona	28	13	9	6	44	28	+16	48	
6	Elpida Astromeriti	28	13	3	12	44	39	+5	42 (Note: Elpida 3p, 2–2, 2 a.; POX 3p, 2–2, 1 a.)	
7	P.O. Xylotymvou	28	12	6	10	44	39	+5	42	
8	Livadiakos/Salamina Livadion	28	11	3	14	32	49	−17	36 (Note: Livadiakos 6p; Frenaros FC 0p)	
9	Frenaros FC	28	11	3	14	43	45	−2	36	
10	Lenas Limassol	28	10	4	14	41	44	−3	34 (Note: Lenas 3p, 4–3; Omonia 3p, 3–4)	
11	Omonia Oroklinis	28	10	4	14	35	46	−11	34	
12	Olympias Lympion	28	8	7	13	39	39	0	31	
13	Enosis Kokkinotrimithia	28	8	4	16	24	56	−32	28	
14	OXEN Peristeronas (R)	28	6	3	19	23	58	−35	21	Relegated to regional leagues
15	Kissos Kissonergas (Note: Kissos FC Kissonergas withdrew from the league after the 22nd matchday. The decision to withdraw was taken after the team received heavy penalties by the judicial committee of the Cyprus Football Association. The rest Kissos FC' scheduled matches until the end of the season were cancelled and all the opponents awarded a 3–0 win over Kissos FC. Also, all the points the team already won were deducted and reduced to zero.) (R)	28	0	0	28	0	94	−94	0	Relegated to regional leagues

Source: League standings at CFA
Rules for classification: 1) points; 2) head-to-head points; 3) head-to-head goal difference; 4) head-to-head away goals scored; 5) goal difference; 6) number of goals scored.
(C) Champions; (P) Promoted; (R) Relegated

== Results ==
Home \ Away	AMT	ASP	DGN	ENY	ELP	ENK	IRK	KSS (Note: Kissos FC Kissonergas withdrew from the league after the 22nd matchday. The decision to withdraw was taken after the team received heavy penalties by the judicial committee of the Cyprus Football Association. The rest Kissos FC' scheduled matches until the end of the season were cancelled and all the opponents awarded a 3–0 win over Kissos FC. Also, all the points the team already won were deducted and reduced to zero.)	LSL	LNS	OLM	OMN	OXN	POX	FRN
Amathus		0–0	0–0	3–1	0–0	3–0	4–2	6–0	5–1	0–0	5–1	5–0	6–0	5–2	1–0
ASPIS	2–3		2–2	0–3	3–2	4–1	3–2	7–0	2–0	2–1	1–0	3–2	3–0	3–1	3–1
Digenis	0–1	1–1		0–0	1–0	2–0	3–2	3–0	1–0	3–3	1–1	3–1	5–1	1–1	3–1
ENY	2–1	3–2	5–2		4–1	7–1	1–1	3–0	2–0	0–0	2–1	5–1	2–1	4–1	3–2
Elpida	2–4	0–4	1–2	0–1		2–1	2–1	3–0	2–0	4–1	2–1	2–1	4–0	0–1	2–1
Enosis	2–1	0–5	0–0	0–1	1–0		0–3	3–0	0–1	3–1	0–2	1–1	1–0	0–5	2–2
Iraklis	2–1	0–1	1–0	2–1	0–0	2–0		3–0	8–1	1–0	3–1	3–0	2–0	4–0	2–0
Kissos (Note: Kissos FC Kissonergas withdrew from the league after the 22nd matchday. The decision to withdraw was taken after the team received heavy penalties by the judicial committee of the Cyprus Football Association. The rest Kissos FC' scheduled matches until the end of the season were cancelled and all the opponents awarded a 3–0 win over Kissos FC. Also, all the points the team already won were deducted and reduced to zero.)	0–3	0–3	0–3	0–3	0–3	0–3	0–3		0–3	0–3	0–3	0–3	0–3	0–3	0–3
Livadiakos	1–3	0–2	1–0	1–3	3–2	1–2	1–1	3–0		1–0	1–2	2–1	2–0	1–6	3–1
Lenas	0–3	1–4	0–1	1–2	1–1	0–3	1–0	5–0	2–0		3–2	3–1	3–0	2–1	1–2
Olympias	0–2	1–1	1–1	1–2	3–2	5–0	1–1	3–0	2–1	1–2		0–1	1–1	0–0	2–0
Omonia	1–1	0–3	2–1	1–2	1–2	3–0	0–3	3–0	0–1	2–1	2–1		3–0	1–0	1–1
OXEN	0–3	1–2	1–0	2–1	0–2	0–0	1–2	3–0	1–1	1–2	2–1	2–1		0–1	1–2
POX	0–3	1–0	1–3	2–1	1–2	2–0	1–0	3–0	1–1	5–4	1–1	0–0	3–0		0–2
Frenaros FC	1–5	1–2	1–2	0–3	3–1	3–0	2–1	4–0	0–1	1–0	2–1	1–2	5–2	1–1	

Source: Results at CFA
Legend: Blue = home team win; Yellow = draw; Red = away team win.

== See also ==
- Cypriot Fourth Division
- 2013–14 Cypriot First Division
- 2013–14 Cypriot Cup for lower divisions
- Cypriot football league system

== Sources ==
- Official website (in Greek)
- "2013/14 Cypriot Fourth Division". Rec.Sport.Soccer Statistics Foundation. 2016-01-14.
- "League standings" (in Greek). Cyprus Football Association. Archived from the original on December 24, 2015.
- "Results" (in Greek). Cyprus Football Association. Archived from the original on 2017-08-31.
- "Teams" (in Greek). Cyprus Football Association. Archived from the original on December 24, 2015.
- "Scorers" (in Greek). Cyprus Football Association. Archived from the original on December 24, 2015.
