= 2018–19 in Cypriot football =

Football in Cyprus
- Season: 2018–19

Men's football
- Super Cup: AEK Larnaca

The following article is a summary of the 2018–19 football season in Cyprus, which is the 77th season of competitive football in the country and runs from August 2018 to May 2019.

== UEFA competitions ==
=== UEFA Champions League ===
==== Qualifying phase and play-off round ====
===== First qualifying round =====
Team 1	Agg.	Team 2	1st leg	2nd leg
Sūduva Marijampolė (Lithuania)	3–2	(Cyprus) APOEL	3–1	0–1

=== UEFA Europa League ===
==== Champions Path ====
===== Qualifying phase and play-off round =====
====== Second qualifying round ======
Team 1	Agg.	Team 2	1st leg	2nd leg
APOEL (Cyprus)	5–2	(Estonia) Flora Tallinn	5–0	0–2

====== Third qualifying round ======
Team 1	Agg.	Team 2	1st leg	2nd leg
Hapoel Be'er Sheva (Israel)	3–5	(Cyprus) APOEL	2–2	1–3

====== Play-off round ======
Team 1	Agg.	Team 2	1st leg	2nd leg
APOEL (Cyprus)	1–1 (1–2 p)	(Kazakhstan) Astana	1–0	0–1 (a.e.t.)

==== Main Path ====
===== Qualifying phase and play-off round =====
====== First qualifying round ======
Team 1	Agg.	Team 2	1st leg	2nd leg
Stumbras (Lithuania)	1–2	(Cyprus) Apollon Limassol	1–0	0–2
Anorthosis Famagusta (Cyprus)	2–2 (a)	(Albania) Laçi	2–1	0–1

====== Second qualifying round ======
Team 1	Agg.	Team 2	1st leg	2nd leg
Dundalk (Republic of Ireland)	0–4	(Cyprus) AEK Larnaca	0–0	0–4
Željezničar (Bosnia and Herzegovina)	2–5	(Cyprus) Apollon Limassol	1–2	1–3

====== Third qualifying round ======
Team 1	Agg.	Team 2	1st leg	2nd leg
Sturm Graz (Austria)	0–7	(Cyprus) AEK Larnaca	0–2	0–5
Apollon Limassol (Cyprus)	4–1	(Belarus) Dynamo Brest	4–0	0–1

====== Play-off round ======
Team 1	Agg.	Team 2	1st leg	2nd leg
Trenčín (Slovakia)	1–4	(Cyprus) AEK Larnaca	1–1	0–3
Basel (Switzerland)	3–3 (a)	(Cyprus) Apollon Limassol	3–2	0–1

Notes

Order of legs reversed after original draw.

==== Group stage ====
===== Group A =====
Pos	Team	Pld	W	D	L	GF	GA	GD	Pts	Qualification	LEV	ZUR	AKL	LUD
1	(Germany) Bayer Leverkusen	6	4	1	1	16	9	+7	13	Advance to knockout phase	—	1–0	4–2	1–1
2	(Switzerland) Zürich	6	3	1	2	7	6	+1	10	Advance to knockout phase	3–2	—	1–2	1–0
3	(Cyprus) AEK Larnaca	6	1	2	3	6	12	−6	5		1–5	0–1	—	1–1
4	(Bulgaria) Ludogorets Razgrad	6	0	4	2	5	7	−2	4		2–3	1–1	0–0	—

Source: UEFA
Rules for classification: Group stage tiebreakers

===== Group H =====
Pos	Team	Pld	W	D	L	GF	GA	GD	Pts	Qualification	FRA	LAZ	APL	MAR
1	(Germany) Eintracht Frankfurt	6	6	0	0	17	5	+12	18	Advance to knockout phase	—	4–1	2–0	4–0
2	(Italy) Lazio	6	3	0	3	9	11	−2	9	Advance to knockout phase	1–2	—	2–1	2–1
3	(Cyprus) Apollon Limassol	6	2	1	3	10	10	0	7		2–3	2–0	—	2–2
4	(France) Marseille	6	0	1	5	6	16	−10	1		1–2	1–3	1–3	—

Source: UEFA
Rules for classification: Group stage tiebreakers

=== UEFA Youth League ===
==== Domestic Champions Path ====
===== First round =====
Team 1	Agg.	Team 2	1st leg	2nd leg
AEL Limassol (Cyprus)	1–4	(Greece) PAOK	1–2	0–2

== Men's football ==
=== Cypriot First Division ===
==== Regular season ====
Pos	Team	Pld	W	D	L	GF	GA	GD	Pts	Qualification or relegation
1	APOEL	22	15	4	3	45	20	+25	49	Qualification for the Championship round
2	Apollon Limassol	22	14	5	3	50	17	+33	47	Qualification for the Championship round
3	AEL Limassol	22	14	3	5	35	25	+10	45	Qualification for the Championship round
4	AEK Larnaca	22	11	6	5	37	16	+21	39	Qualification for the Championship round
5	Omonia	22	9	4	9	25	24	+1	31 (Note: Head to head record: Omonia 3–1 Nea Salamis, Nea Salamis 1–0 Omonia.)	Qualification for the Championship round
6	Nea Salamis Famagusta	22	9	4	9	28	30	−2	31	Qualification for the Championship round
7	Anorthosis Famagusta (Note: Anorthosis were deducted six points for use of unregistered player on a game against Apollon on 2 February 2019.)	22	9	7	6	27	26	+1	28	Qualification for the Relegation round
8	Pafos FC (Note: Pafos FC were deducted six points for use of unregistered player on a game against AEK Larnaca on 2 January 2019.)	22	7	6	9	24	36	−12	21	Qualification for the Relegation round
9	Doxa Katokopias	22	5	5	12	28	39	−11	20	Qualification for the Relegation round
10	Enosis Neon Paralimni	22	4	5	13	17	38	−21	17 (Note: Head to head record: Paralimni 2–0 Alki, Alki 1–2 Paralimni.)	Qualification for the Relegation round
11	Alki Oroklini	22	4	5	13	19	43	−24	17	Qualification for the Relegation round
12	Ermis Aradippou	22	2	4	16	19	40	−21	10	Qualification for the Relegation round

Source: Cyprus Football Association, Soccerway
Rules for classification: 1) Points; 2) Head-to-head points; 3) Head-to-head goal difference; 4) Head-to-head goals scored; 5) Head-to-head away goals scored (only if two teams); 6) Goal difference; 7) Goals scored; 8) Play-off (only if deciding championship round, relegation round or relegation).

==== Play-offs ====
Pos	Team	Pld	W	D	L	GF	GA	GD	Pts	Qualification
1	APOEL (C)	32	21	7	4	66	25	+41	70	Qualification for the Champions League second qualifying round
2	AEK Larnaca	32	18	8	6	51	23	+28	62	Qualification for the Europa League first qualifying round
3	Apollon Limassol	32	17	7	8	64	32	+32	58	Qualification for the Europa League first qualifying round
4	AEL Limassol	32	17	4	11	49	47	+2	55	Qualification for the Europa League second qualifying round (Note: AEL Limassol qualified for the Europa League second qualifying round by winning the 2018–19 Cypriot Cup.)
5	Nea Salamis Famagusta	32	12	8	12	41	47	−6	44	
6	Omonia	32	10	6	16	36	45	−9	36	

Updated to match(es) played on 20 May 2019. Source: CFA (in Greek)
Rules for classification: 1) Points; 2) Head-to-head points; 3) Head-to-head goal difference; 4) Head-to-head goals scored; 5) Head-to-head away goals scored (only if two teams); 6) Goal difference; 7) Goals scored; 8) Play-off (only if deciding champion or UEFA competitions).
(C) Champions
Notes:

Pos	Team	Pld	W	D	L	GF	GA	GD	Pts	Relegation
7	Anorthosis Famagusta (Note: Anorthosis were deducted six points for use of unregistered player on a game against Apollon on 2 February 2019.)	32	12	11	9	42	41	+1	41	
8	Pafos FC (Note: Pafos FC were deducted six points for use of unregistered player on a game against AEK Larnaca on 2 January 2019.)	32	12	8	12	39	50	−11	38	
9	Doxa Katokopias	32	9	8	15	47	50	−3	35	
10	Enosis Neon Paralimni	32	9	8	15	35	51	−16	35	
11	Alki Oroklini (R)	32	10	5	17	35	58	−23	35	Relegation to the Cypriot Second Division
12	Ermis Aradippou (R)	32	3	4	25	29	65	−36	13	Relegation to the Cypriot Second Division

Source: CFA
Rules for classification: 1) Points; 2) Head-to-head points; 3) Head-to-head goal difference; 4) Head-to-head goals scored; 5) Head-to-head away goals scored (only if two teams); 6) Goal difference; 7) Goals scored; 8) Play-off (only if deciding champion or UEFA competitions).
(R) Relegated

=== Cypriot Second Division ===
Pos	Team	Pld	W	D	L	GF	GA	GD	Pts	Qualification or relegation
1	Ethnikos Achna	27	18	8	1	58	20	+38	62	Promotion to Cypriot First Division
2	Olympiakos Nicosia	27	19	3	5	63	27	+36	60	Promotion to Cypriot First Division
3	Aris Limassol	27	18	5	4	55	30	+25	59	
4	Othellos Athienou	27	13	8	6	59	28	+31	47	
5	Anagennisi Deryneia	27	12	5	10	38	28	+10	41	
6	ASIL Lysi	27	11	6	10	32	33	−1	39	
7	Omonia Aradippou	27	12	2	13	39	36	+3	38	
8	Onisilos Sotira 2014	27	11	4	12	37	40	−3	37 (Note: Head to head record: Karmiotissa 2–1 Onisilos, Onisilos 3–1 Karmiotissa.)	
9	Karmiotissa	27	11	4	12	42	53	−11	37	
10	Ayia Napa	27	9	7	11	39	36	+3	34	
11	AEZ Zakakiou	27	9	6	12	36	47	−11	33	
12	Akritas Chlorakas	27	10	2	15	32	53	−21	32	
13	MEAP Nisou	27	7	6	14	38	48	−10	27	Relegation to the Cypriot Third Division
14	THOI Lakatamia	27	6	8	13	22	49	−27	26	Relegation to the Cypriot Third Division
15	PAEEK (R)	27	5	7	15	33	55	−22	22	Relegation to the Cypriot Third Division
16	Digenis Oroklinis (R)	27	3	5	19	25	65	−40	14	Relegation to the Cypriot Third Division

Updated to match(es) played on 24 April 2019. Source: CFA (in Greek)
Rules for classification: 1) Points; 2) Head-to-head points; 3) Head-to-head goal difference; 4) Head-to-head goals scored; 5) Head-to-head away goals scored (only if two teams); 6) Goal difference; 7) Goals scored; 8) Play-off (only if deciding championship round, relegation round or relegation).
(R) Relegated

=== Cypriot Third Division ===
Pos	Team	Pld	W	D	L	GF	GA	GD	Pts	Qualification or relegation
1	Digenis Akritas Morphou (C, P)	30	19	5	6	62	26	+36	62	Promotion to the Cypriot Second Division
2	Omonia Psevda (P)	30	18	4	8	50	35	+15	58	Promotion to the Cypriot Second Division
3	Enosi Neon Ypsona-Digenis Ipsona (P)	30	14	11	5	52	27	+25	53	Promotion to the Cypriot Second Division
4	P.O. Xylotymbou (P)	30	14	10	6	39	25	+14	52	Promotion to the Cypriot Second Division
5	ENAD Polis Chrysochous	30	14	5	11	45	35	+10	47	
6	Ethnikos Assia	30	12	7	11	44	44	0	43 (Note: Head to head record: E. Assia 1–2 Chalkanoras, Chalkanoras 0–2 E. Assia.)	
7	Chalkanoras Idaliou	30	12	7	11	52	50	+2	43	
8	Kouris Erimis	30	11	9	10	39	39	0	42	
9	Ormideia FC	30	11	8	11	44	39	+5	41	
10	Achyronas Liopetriou	30	9	13	8	42	42	0	40	
11	Elpida Astromeriti	30	11	6	13	38	49	−11	39	
12	Amathus Ayiou Tychona	30	11	5	14	37	42	−5	38 (Note: Head to head record: Amathus 2–1 APEA, APEA 2–2 Amathus.)	
13	APEA Akrotiriou (R)	30	10	8	12	43	50	−7	38	Relegation to the STOK Elite Division
14	Olympias Lympion (R)	30	9	6	15	43	53	−10	33	Relegation to the STOK Elite Division
15	Ethnikos Latsion (R)	30	7	4	19	30	52	−22	25	Relegation to the STOK Elite Division
16	Peyia 2014 (R)	30	1	6	23	25	77	−52	9	Relegation to the STOK Elite Division

Source: CFA
Rules for classification: 1) Points; 2) Head-to-head points; 3) Head-to-head goal difference; 4) Head-to-head goals scored; 5) Head-to-head away goals scored (only if two teams); 6) Goal difference; 7) Goals scored; 8) Play-off (only if deciding championship round, relegation round or relegation).
(C) Champions; (P) Promoted; (R) Relegated

=== STOK Elite Division ===
Pos	Team	Pld	W	D	L	GF	GA	GD	Pts	Qualification or relegation
1	Iraklis Gerolakkou (C, P)	26	17	2	7	56	33	+23	53	Promotion to Cypriot Third Division
2	Elia Lythrodonta (P)	26	14	5	7	40	26	+14	47	Promotion to Cypriot Third Division
3	APONA Anageias (P)	26	14	4	8	48	20	+28	46	Promotion to Cypriot Third Division
4	Kormakitis FC (P)	26	12	7	7	31	23	+8	43	Promotion to Cypriot Third Division
5	AEK Korakou	26	12	6	8	36	28	+8	42	
6	AEN Ayiou Georgiou Vrysoullon-Acheritou	26	12	4	10	39	35	+4	40 (Note: Head to head record: AEN Vrysoullon 4–1 APEP, APEP 0–0 AEN Vrysoullon.)	
7	APEP FC	26	11	7	8	41	29	+12	40	
8	ASPIS Pylas	26	9	6	11	32	33	−1	33 (Note: Head to head record: ASPIS: 10 points, Orfeas: 7 points, Finikas: 7 points, Doxa: 5 points.)	
9	Orfeas Nicosia	26	7	12	7	37	36	+1	33	
10	Finikas Ayias Marinas Chrysochous	26	9	6	11	32	37	−5	33	
11	Doxa Paliometochou	26	10	3	13	27	43	−16	33	
12	Atlas Aglandjias	26	11	2	13	36	38	−2	35	
13	Rotsidis Mammari (R)	26	8	8	10	41	38	+3	32	Relegation to the regional leagues
14	Livadiakos/Salamina Livadion (Note: On 11 September 2018, Livadiakos/Salamina Livadion informed Cyprus Football Association (CFA) that they are unable to participate in the league.) (R)	26	0	0	26	0	78	−78	0	Relegation to the regional leagues

Source: CFA
Rules for classification: 1) Points; 2) Head-to-head points; 3) Head-to-head goal difference; 4) Head-to-head goals scored; 5) Head-to-head away goals scored (only if two teams); 6) Goal difference; 7) Goals scored; 8) Play-off (only if deciding championship round, relegation round or relegation).
(C) Champions; (P) Promoted; (R) Relegated
