= 2016–17 STOK Elite Division =

STOK Elite Division
- Season: 2016–17
- Champions: Onisilos Sotira 2014 (1st title)
- Promoted: Onisilos Sotira 2014; APEA Akrotiriou; Finikas; Elpida
- Relegated: ASPIS Pylas; Koloni Geroskipou FC; Lenas Lemesou; Spartakos Kitiou
- Matches played: 161
- Goals scored: 485 (3.01 per match)
- Top goalscorer: Valentinos Aristidou (14 goals)

The 2016–17 STOK Elite Division was the 2nd season of the Cypriot fourth-level football league.

== Format ==
Fourteen teams participated in the 2016–17 STOK Elite Division. All teams played against each other twice, once at their home and once away. The team with the most points at the end of the season crowned champions. The first three teams were promoted to the 2016–17 Cypriot Third Division and the last two teams were relegated to the regional leagues.

=== Point system ===
Teams received three points for a win, one point for a draw and zero points for a loss.

== Changes from previous season ==
Teams promoted to 2016–17 Cypriot Third Division

- Livadiakos/Salamina Livadion
- Peyia 2014
- AEN Ayiou Georgiou Vrysoullon-Acheritou

Teams relegated from 2015–16 Cypriot Third Division

- Kouris Erimis
- Amathus Ayiou Tychona

Teams promoted from regional leagues

- Doxa Paliometochou
- Atlas Aglandjias
- Koloni Geroskipou FC

Teams relegated to regional leagues

- Enosis Kokkinotrimithia
- Adonis Idaliou

== Stadia and locations ==
Locations of the 2016–17 STOK Elite Division teams.

Club	Venue
Amathus	Ayios Tychonas Municipal Stadium
APEA Akrotiriou	Olympos Acheritou Stadium
ASPIS Pylas	Pyla Municipal Stadium
Atlas Aglandjias	Aglandjia Municipal Stadium
Elpida Astromeriti	Katokopia Municipal Stadium
Finikas Ayias Marinas Chrysochous	Euripides Municipal Stadium
Frenaros FC	Frenaros Municipal Stadium
Koloni Geroskipou FC	Geroskipou Municipality Stadium
Kornos FC	Kornos Municipal Stadium
Kouris Erimis	Erimi Municipal Stadium
Livadiakos/Salamina Livadion	Ayia Pasaskevi Livadion Municipality Stadium
Lenas Limassol	Trachoni Municipal Stadium
Onisilos Sotira	Sotira Municipal Stadium
Spartakos Kitiou	Kiti Municipal Stadium

== League standings ==
Pos	Team	Pld	W	D	L	GF	GA	GD	Pts	Qualification or relegation
1	Onisilos Sotira 2014 (C, P)	26	19	5	2	58	19	+39	62	Promotion to Cypriot Third Division
2	APEA Akrotiriou (P)	26	15	5	6	40	27	+13	50	Promotion to Cypriot Third Division
3	Finikas Ayias Marinas Chrysochous (P)	26	14	4	8	38	31	+7	46	Promotion to Cypriot Third Division
4	Elpida Astromeriti (P)	26	12	3	11	38	31	+7	39 (Note: Head-to-head: Elpida 7 points, Frenaros 6 points, Amathus 4 points.)	Promotion to Cypriot Third Division
5	Frenaros FC 2000	26	11	6	9	45	49	−4	39	
6	Amathus Ayiou Tychona (Note: Amathus were deducted three points as their fans stopped the home match against Elpida Astromeriti at the 79th minute, and the score was 2–0 for the away team.)	26	11	9	6	43	31	+12	39	
7	Kouris Erimis	26	11	5	10	39	37	+2	38 (Note: Head-to-head record: Kouris 1–0 Atlas, Atlas 1–1 Kouris.)	
8	Atlas Aglandjias	26	11	5	10	48	39	+9	38	
9	Doxa Paliometochou	26	11	4	11	47	45	+2	37	
10	Kornos FC 2013	26	10	6	10	44	47	−3	36 (Note: Head-to-head record: Kornos FC 2013 2–0 ASPIS, ASPIS 1–0 Kornos FC 2013.)	
11	ASPIS Pylas (R)	26	11	3	12	38	40	−2	36	Relegation to the regional leagues
12	Koloni Geroskipou FC (R)	26	7	7	12	37	43	−6	28	Relegation to the regional leagues
13	Lenas Lemesou (R)	26	3	5	18	32	62	−30	14	Relegation to the regional leagues
14	Spartakos Kitiou (R)	26	0	5	21	25	64	−39	5	Relegation to the regional leagues

Source: CFA
Rules for classification: 1) Points; 2) Head-to-head points; 3) Head-to-head goal difference; 4) Head-to-head goals scored; 5) Head-to-head away goals scored (only if two teams); 6) Goal difference; 7) Goals scored; 8) Play-off (only if deciding championship round, relegation round or relegation).
(C) Champions; (P) Promoted; (R) Relegated

== Results ==
Home \ Away	AMA	APEA	ASP	ATL	DOX	ELP	FIN	FRE	KOL	KOR	KOU	LEN	ONI	SPA
Amathus Ayiou Tychona	—	2–0	2–0	1–0	4–2	0–3	2–2	2–0	2–2	1–1	3–1	4–0	1–1	3–2
APEA Akrotiriou	2–0	—	2–1	0–2	3–2	1–0	0–1	4–0	3–2	4–2	2–1	0–0	0–2	2–1
ASPIS Pylas	2–2	1–2	—	1–0	2–3	1–0	1–2	3–1	0–2	1–0	1–3	2–1	0–0	3–0
Atlas Aglandjias	1–1	0–2	1–0	—	2–1	1–4	1–1	2–3	3–2	0–1	1–1	7–0	1–2	4–2
Doxa Paliometochou	0–3	0–1	0–0	3–3	—	2–2	2–4	2–1	3–2	2–3	2–0	3–0	1–4	1–0
Elpida Astromeriti	0–0	0–0	2–0	4–5	1–0	—	1–0	3–0	2–0	3–1	1–2	2–1	1–2	3–2
Finikas Ayias Marinas Chrysochous	0–1	1–0	2–3	1–3	3–2	1–0	—	0–1	2–1	2–1	1–0	4–2	3–0	2–0
Frenaros FC 2000	3–2	3–0	2–1	2–2	2–4	2–1	2–1	—	1–1	3–3	1–0	2–2	1–1	2–2
Koloni Geroskipou FC	2–1	1–1	1–2	2–0	0–1	2–1	0–0	4–2	—	0–1	2–1	4–2	1–4	2–2
Kornos FC 2013	0–2	1–4	2–0	0–2	0–5	2–0	1–1	3–2	3–0	—	1–1	6–1	1–4	4–1
Kouris Erimis	0–1	0–2	6–7	1–0	2–1	2–0	2–0	5–3	1–1	1–1	—	2–1	0–0	3–1
Lenas Lemesou	2–1	1–1	0–2	1–3	1–2	1–2	0–1	1–2	2–1	1–1	1–3	—	0–4	4–4
Onisilos Sotira 2014	1–0	3–0	3–2	3–1	1–1	3–1	5–1	0–1	2–1	3–0	3–0	2–1	—	2–0
Spartakos Kitiou	2–2	0–2	1–2	0–3	1–2	0–1	0–2	0–3	1–1	2–5	0–1	1–2	0–3	—

Source: Cyprus Football Association
Legend: Blue = home team win; Yellow = draw; Red = away team win.
For upcoming matches, an "a" indicates there is an article about the rivalry between the two participants.

== Sources ==
- "2015/16 STOK Elite Division". Rec.Sport.Soccer Statistics Foundation. 2016-10-14.
- "League standings". Cyprus Football Association.
- "Results". Cyprus Football Association.
- "Teams". Cyprus Football Association.
- "Scorers". Cyprus Football Association.

== See also ==
- STOK Elite Division
- 2016–17 Cypriot First Division
- 2016–17 Cypriot Second Division
- 2016–17 Cypriot Third Division
- 2016–17 Cypriot Cup for lower divisions
