= 2012–13 Cypriot Fourth Division =

Cypriot Fourth Division
- Season: 2012–13
- Champions: MEAP (2nd title)
- Promoted: MEAP; Finikas; THOI; K. & E. Trachoniou
- Relegated: AEN; Dynamo
- Matches played: 182
- Goals scored: 545 (2.99 per match)
- Top goalscorer: Demetris Maris (19 goals)

The 2012–13 Cypriot Fourth Division was the 28th season of the Cypriot fourth-level football league. MEAP Nisou won their 2nd title.

== Format ==
Fourteen teams participated in the 2012–13 Cypriot Fourth Division. All teams played against each other twice, once at their home and once away. The team with the most points at the end of the season crowned champions. The first four teams were promoted to the 2013–14 Cypriot Third Division and the last two teams were relegated to regional leagues.

=== Point system ===
Teams received three points for a win, one point for a draw and zero points for a loss.

== Changes from previous season ==
Teams promoted to 2012–13 Cypriot Third Division

- Digenis Oroklinis
- Karmiotissa Pano Polemidion
- Ethnikos Latsion FC

Teams relegated from 2011–12 Cypriot Third Division

- Anagennisi Germasogeias^{1}
- POL/AE Maroni^{2}

^{1}Withdrew from the 2012–13 Cypriot Fourth Division during the summer, before the start of the season.
^{2}Withdrew after 14th round of 2011–12 Cypriot Third Division for financial reasons. Not participated in 2012–13 Cypriot Fourth Division.

Teams promoted from regional leagues

- AEN Ayiou Georgiou Vrysoullon-Acheritou
- ASPIS Pylas
- Enosi Neon Ypsona
- Amathus Ayiou Tychona

Teams relegated to regional leagues

- Kedros Ayia Marina Skylloura
- AEK Kythreas
- AEK Korakou

Notes:

- Livadiakos/Salamina Livadion also secured participation in the 2012–13 Cypriot Fourth Division. The team secured their participation in the 2011–12 Cypriot Fourth Division through the amateur divisions. However, Cyprus Football Association decided that the team did not meet basic requirements for the registering as a member of the federation. After an extraordinary general meeting it was decided that the team was eventually able to join the Cyprus Football Association. But, because the 2011–12 Cypriot Fourth Division had already began, it was decided that the team would book a place to the 2012–13 Cypriot Fourth Division.

== Stadia and locations ==
2012–13 Cypriot Fourth Division

Club	Venue
AEN Ayiou Georgiou	Olympos Acheritou Stadium
Amathus Ayiou Tychona	Germasogeia Municipal Stadium
ASPIS Pylas	Pyla Municipal Stadium
Dynamo Pervolion	Pervolia Municipal Stadium
Elpida Astromeriti	Akaki Municipal Stadium
THOI Lakatamia	EN THOI Stadium
Enosi Neon Ypsona	Stelios Chari Stadium
Iraklis Gerolakkou	EN THOI Stadium
Kissos Kissonergas	Kissonerga Municipal Stadium
Konstantios & Evripidis Trachoniou	Trachoni Municipal Stadium
Livadiakos/Salamina Livadion	Ayia Pasaskevi Livadion Municipality Stadium
MEAP Nisou	Theodorio Koinotiko
P.O. Xylotymvou	Xylotympou Municipal Stadium
Finikas Ayias Marinas Chrysochous	Evripides Municipal Stadium

== League standings ==
Pos	Team	Pld	W	D	L	GF	GA	GD	Pts	Promotion or relegation
1	MEAP Nisou (C, P)	26	16	8	2	53	24	+29	56	Promoted to Cypriot Third Division
2	Finikas Ayias Marinas Chrysochous (P)	26	14	8	4	46	23	+23	50	Promoted to Cypriot Third Division
3	THOI Lakatamia (P)	26	13	6	7	49	29	+20	45	Promoted to Cypriot Third Division
4	Konstantios & Evripidis Trachoniou (P)	26	11	7	8	40	33	+7	40	Promoted to Cypriot Third Division
5	Enosi Neon Ypsona	26	8	12	6	38	36	+2	36 (Note: ENY 3p, 2–2, 1 a.; Iraklis 3p, 2–2, 0 a.)	
6	Iraklis Gerolakkou	26	11	3	12	45	44	+1	36	
7	Elpida Astromeriti	26	8	8	10	48	49	−1	32	
8	ASPIS Pylas	26	8	7	11	33	42	−9	31 (Note: ASPIS 12p; Kissos FC 10p; Livadiakos 7p; POX 2p)	
9	Kissos Kissonergas	26	9	4	13	40	59	−19	31	
10	Livadiakos/Salamina Livadion	26	7	10	9	31	33	−2	31	
11	P.O. Xylotymvou	26	8	7	11	38	33	+5	31	
12	Amathus Ayiou Tychona	26	7	9	10	31	43	−12	30	
13	AEN Ayiou Georgiou (R)	26	6	8	12	28	41	−13	26	Relegated to regional leagues
14	Dynamo Pervolion (R)	26	4	7	15	25	56	−31	19	Relegated to regional leagues

Source: League standings at CFA
Rules for classification: 1) points; 2) head-to-head points; 3) head-to-head goal difference; 4) head-to-head away goals scored; 5) goal difference; 6) number of goals scored.
(C) Champions; (P) Promoted; (R) Relegated

== Results ==
Home \ Away	AEN	AMT	ASP	DNM	ENY	THL	ELP	IRK	KSS	K&E	LSL	MPN	POX	FNK
AEN		2–1	1–0	1–2	3–1	0–1	0–1	2–2	3–1	1–5	1–1	2–1	0–1	1–1
Amathous	2–3		1–3	0–0	1–1	1–1	2–2	1–3	0–0	2–1	1–0	1–1	1–0	0–3
ASPIS	1–1	1–2		0–1	2–1	0–4	3–2	1–3	2–2	2–1	1–1	1–1	2–0	0–0
Dynamo	0–0	1–1	1–2		2–2	1–3	1–1	1–5	1–2	1–3	1–2	0–3	1–1	1–0
ENY	3–2	2–0	1–0	1–1		3–0	3–3	1–0	1–1	1–1	1–1	0–0	2–1	1–1
THOI	0–0	0–1	5–1	3–0	2–2		3–2	0–1	4–0	2–0	2–1	1–3	3–0	1–3
Elpida	0–0	1–1	3–2	2–3	4–1	2–6		4–0	3–0	2–1	3–0	1–1	1–1	0–1
Iraklis	2–0	0–1	2–2	3–2	2–1	1–1	3–2		4–0	0–2	2–3	1–2	1–3	4–2
Kissos	3–2	2–4	1–2	3–0	3–2	1–3	4–3	2–5		2–2	1–3	1–2	3–1	1–3
K & E	4–2	3–1	2–1	2–0	1–1	0–1	1–2	2–0	0–2		1–0	3–3	1–0	1–1
Livadiakos	1–0	2–2	1–1	4–1	0–2	0–0	1–1	1–0	0–2	1–2		1–1	2–2	3–0
MEAP	3–0	4–2	2–0	3–1	1–2	2–1	3–2	3–1	4–0	5–1	1–0		2–1	1–0
POX	3–0	3–1	2–3	5–2	3–1	1–1	5–0	2–0	1–2	0–0	0–0	1–1		1–2
Finikas	1–1	4–1	1–0	4–0	1–1	3–1	3–1	3–0	4–1	0–0	4–2	0–0	1–0	

Source: Results at CFA
Legend: Blue = home team win; Yellow = draw; Red = away team win.

== See also ==
- Cypriot Fourth Division
- 2012–13 Cypriot First Division
- 2012–13 Cypriot Cup for lower divisions
- Cypriot football league system

== Sources ==
- Official website (in Greek)
- "2012/13 Cypriot Fourth Division". Rec.Sport.Soccer Statistics Foundation. 2016-01-14.
- "League standings" (in Greek). Cyprus Football Association. Archived from the original on 2015-12-24.
- "Results" (in Greek). Cyprus Football Association. Archived from the original on 2015-12-24.
- "Teams" (in Greek). Cyprus Football Association. Archived from the original on 2015-12-24.
- "Scorers" (in Greek). Cyprus Football Association. Archived from the original on 2015-12-24.
