= 2015–16 STOK Elite Division =

STOK Elite Division
- Season: 2015–16
- Champions: Livadiakos/Salamina (1st title)
- Promoted: Livadiakos/Salamina; Peyia; AEN
- Relegated: Enosis K. Adonis
- Matches played: 182
- Goals scored: 591 (3.25 per match)
- Top goalscorer: Michalakis Kalogirou (25 goals)

The 2015–16 STOK Elite Division was the 1st season of the Cypriot fourth-level football league. Livadiakos/Salamina Livadion won their 1st title.

== Format ==
Fourteen teams participated in the 2015–16 STOK Elite Division. All teams played against each other twice, once at their home and once away. The team with the most points at the end of the season crowned champions. The first three teams were promoted to the 2016–17 Cypriot Third Division and the last two teams were relegated to the regional leagues.

=== Point system ===
Teams received three points for a win, one point for a draw and zero points for a loss.

== Changes from previous season ==
Teams of 2014–15 Cypriot Fourth Division

- AEN Ayiou Georgiou Vrysoullon-Acheritou
- Livadiakos/Salamina Livadion
- Adonis Idaliou
- ASPIS Pylas
- Elpida Astromeriti
- Lenas Limassol
- Frenaros FC
- Spartakos Kitiou
- Enosis Kokkinotrimithia

Teams promoted from regional leagues

- Peyia 2014
- Onisilos Sotira
- Kornos FC
- APEA Akrotiriou

Teams relegated from 2014–15 Cypriot Third Division

- Finikas Ayias Marinas Chrysochous

== Stadia and locations ==
Locations of the 2015–16 STOK Elite Division teams.

Club	Venue
Adonis Idaliou	Adonis Idaliou Stadium
AEN Ayiou Georgiou Vrysoullon-Acheritou	Olympos Acheritou Stadium
APEA Akrotiriou	Olympos Acheritou Stadium
ASPIS Pylas	Pyla Municipal Stadium
Elpida Astromeriti	Katokopia Municipal Stadium
Enosis Kokkinotrimithia	Kokkinotrimithia Municipal Stadium
Kornos FC	Kornos Municipal Stadium
Livadiakos/Salamina Livadion	Ayia Pasaskevi Livadion Municipality Stadium
Lenas Limassol	Trachoni Municipal Stadium
Onisilos Sotira	Sotira Municipal Stadium
Peyia 2014	Peyia Municipal Stadium
Spartakos Kitiou	Kiti Municipal Stadium
Finikas Ayias Marinas Chrysochous	Euripides Municipal Stadium
Frenaros FC	Frenaros Municipal Stadium

== League standings ==
Pos	Team	Pld	W	D	L	GF	GA	GD	Pts	Promotion or relegation
1	Livadiakos/Salamina Livadion (C, P)	26	20	2	4	78	19	+59	62	Promoted to Cypriot Third Division
2	Peyia 2014 (P)	26	17	3	6	42	17	+25	54	Promoted to Cypriot Third Division
3	AEN Ayiou Georgiou Vrysoullon-Acheritou (P)	26	16	4	6	54	28	+26	52	Promoted to Cypriot Third Division
4	Onisilos Sotira	26	16	3	7	64	30	+34	51	
5	Finikas Ayias Marinas Chrysochous	26	12	7	7	47	40	+7	43 (Note: Foinikas-Kornos FC 3-2, Kornos FC-Foinikas 1-1)	
6	Kornos FC	26	13	4	9	56	44	+12	43	
7	APEA Akrotiriou	26	11	5	10	38	30	+8	38	
8	Frenaros FC	26	10	7	9	37	35	+2	37	
9	Elpida Astromeriti	26	10	4	12	42	46	−4	34	
10	ASPIS Pylas	26	9	6	11	41	45	−4	33	
11	Lenas Limassol	26	8	5	13	31	39	−8	29	
12	Spartakos Kitiou	26	8	4	14	40	57	−17	28	
13	Enosis Kokkinotrimithia (R)	26	3	4	19	21	83	−62	13	Relegated to regional leagues
14	Adonis Idaliou (Note: Adonis Idaliou withdrew before the start of the league. All their matches were postponed and all their opponents awarded a 3–0 win.) (W)	26	0	0	26	0	78	−78	0	Relegated to regional leagues

Source: League standings at CFA
Rules for classification: 1) points; 2) head-to-head points; 3) head-to-head goal difference; 4) head-to-head away goals scored; 5) goal difference; 6) number of goals scored.
(C) Champions; (P) Promoted; (R) Relegated; (W) Withdrew

== Results ==
Home \ Away	ADN	AEN	APK	ASP	ELP	ENS	KRN	LSL	LNS	ONS	PYI	SPR	FNK	FRN
Adonis		0–3^{1}	0–3^{1}	0–3^{1}	0–3^{1}	0–3^{1}	0–3^{1}	0–3^{1}	0–3^{1}	0–3^{1}	0–3^{1}	0–3^{1}	0–3^{1}	0–3^{1}
AEN	3–0^{1}		1–0	3–1	4–0	6–4	1–3	0–1	0–0	2–0	0–1	3–2	1–1	3–0
APEA	3–0^{1}	3–1		1–2	3–0	2–0	0–2	0–3	0–0	0–3	2–1	0–1	3–1	3–1
ASPIS	3–0^{1}	0–5	1–1		4–2	3–0	3–3	0–1	4–1	0–4	1–2	1–0	1–2	0–0
Elpida	3–0^{1}	0–2	3–2	1–1		9–1	0–3^{2}	0–3	1–0	2–5	0–2	3–2	0–1	2–0
Enosis	3–0^{1}	1–3	0–4	1–1	1–1		0–5	0–8	1–4	1–3	0–3	1–1	1–2	1–0
Kornos FC	3–0^{1}	1–0	2–0	2–4	0–2	3–1		0–2	2–2	2–1	1–0	8–0	1–1	3–4
Livadiakos/Salamina	3–0^{1}	1–1	2–0	2–1	3–2	8–0	6–0		4–0	2–1	0–1	5–0	4–2	0–0
Lenas	3–0^{1}	0–2	0–1	3–0	2–0	0–0	2–1	0–2		1–2	0–1	2–1	2–2	3–4
Onisilos	3–0^{1}	3–0	1–1	2–0	3–4	2–0	7–1	3–5	3–0		2–3	2–1	1–1	1–0
Peyia	3–0^{1}	1–2	2–2	2–1	0–1	2–0	0–0	2–1	2–0	0–0		2–0	0–1	3–0
Spartakos	3–0^{1}	2–4	0–3	4–2	2–2	2–0	3–4	4–3	4–0	0–5	1–2		1–1	0–3
Finikas	3–0^{1}	2–2	3–1	1–2	1–0	8–1	3–2	0–5	2–1	3–2	0–3	0–2		2–2
Frenaros	3–0^{1}	1–2	0–0	2–2	1–1	3–0	2–1	2–1	0–2	1–2	2–1	1–1	2–1	

Source: Results
Legend: Blue = home team win; Yellow = draw; Red = away team win.
- ^{1} Adonis Idaliou withdrew before the start of the league. All their matches were cancelled and all the opponents awarded a 3–0 win.
- ^{2} Elpida Astromeriti - Kornos FC 2013 awarded 0-3. Originally 1-0.

== Sources ==
- "2015/16 STOK Elite Division". Rec.Sport.Soccer Statistics Foundation. 2016-10-14.
- "League standings" (in Greek). Cyprus Football Association. Archived from the original on 2017-10-08.
- "Results" (in Greek). Cyprus Football Association. Archived from the original on 2017-10-08.
- "Teams" (in Greek). Cyprus Football Association. Archived from the original on 2017-12-13.
- "Scorers" (in Greek). Cyprus Football Association. Archived from the original on 2017-12-13.

== See also ==
- STOK Elite Division
- 2015–16 Cypriot First Division
- 2015–16 Cypriot Cup for lower divisions
