= 2014–15 Cypriot Fourth Division =

Cypriot Fourth Division
- Season: 2014–15
- Champions: Alki (1st title)
- Promoted: Alki; P.O. Xylotymvou; Iraklis; Olympias; Kouris
- Matches played: 182
- Goals scored: 574 (3.15 per match)
- Top goalscorer: Pantelis Tavrou (25 goals)

The 2014–15 Cypriot Fourth Division was the 30th season of the Cypriot fourth-level football league. Alki Oroklini won their 1st title. The 2014–15 season was the last one ever for the Cypriot Fourth Division, as the league was dissolved and replaced by the STOK Elite Division.

== Format ==
Fourteen teams participated in the 2014–15 Cypriot Fourth Division. All teams played against each other twice, once at their home and once away. The team with the most points at the end of the season crowned champions. The first five teams were promoted to the 2015–16 Cypriot Third Division. All the other teams participated in 2015–16 STOK Elite Division.

=== Point system ===
Teams received three points for a win, one point for a draw and zero points for a loss.

== Changes from previous season ==
Teams promoted to 2014–15 Cypriot Third Division

- Enosi Neon Ypsona
- Amathus Ayiou Tychona

Teams relegated from 2013–14 Cypriot Third Division

- Spartakos Kitiou
- Adonis Idaliou
- Konstantios & Evripidis Trachoniou^{2}

^{1}Konstantios & Evripidis Trachoniou withdrew from the 2014–15 Cypriot Fourth Division.

Teams promoted from regional leagues

- AEN Ayiou Georgiou Vrysoullon-Acheritou
- Kouris Erimis

Teams relegated to regional leagues

- OXEN Peristeronas
- Kissos Kissonergas

Notes:

- Before the start of the season, Enosi Neon Ypsona and Digenis Akritas Ypsona were merged forming ENY-Digenis Ypsona, which took the place of Enosi Neon Ypsona in the Cypriot Third Division.
- Omonia Oroklinis renamed to Alki Oroklini.

== Stadia and locations ==
2014–15 Cypriot Fourth Division

Club	Venue
Adonis Idaliou	Adonis Idaliou Stadium
AEN Ayiou Georgiou Vrysoullon-Acheritou	Olympos Acheritou Stadium
Alki Oroklini	Oroklini Municipal Stadium
ASPIS Pylas	Pyla Municipal Stadium
Elpida Astromeriti	Akaki Municipal Stadium
Enosis Kokkinotrimithia	Kokkinotrimithia Municipal Stadium
Iraklis Gerolakkou	Kykkos Stadium
Kouris Erimis	Erimi Municipal Stadium
Livadiakos/Salamina Livadion	Ayia Pasaskevi Livadion Municipality Stadium
Lenas Limassol	Trachoni Municipal Stadium
Olympias Lympion	Olympias Lympion Stadium
P.O. Xylotymvou	Xylotympou Municipal Stadium
Spartakos Kitiou	Kiti Municipal Stadium
Frenaros FC	Frenaros Municipal Stadium

== League standings ==
Pos	Team	Pld	W	D	L	GF	GA	GD	Pts	Promotion or qualification
1	Alki Oroklini (C, O)	26	20	3	3	64	17	+47	63	Promoted to Cypriot Third Division
2	P.O. Xylotymvou (P)	26	17	4	5	63	21	+42	55	Promoted to Cypriot Third Division
3	Iraklis Gerolakkou (P)	26	16	1	9	50	31	+19	49	Promoted to Cypriot Third Division
4	Olympias Lympion (P)	26	13	7	6	40	21	+19	46	Promoted to Cypriot Third Division
5	Kouris Erimis (P)	26	13	6	7	43	31	+12	45	Promoted to Cypriot Third Division
6	AEN Ayiou Georgiou	26	12	7	7	36	36	0	43	STOK Elite Division
7	Livadiakos/Salamina Livadion	26	11	5	10	45	32	+13	38	STOK Elite Division
8	Adonis Idaliou	26	11	3	12	42	53	−11	36	STOK Elite Division
9	ASPIS Pylas	26	8	7	11	35	38	−3	31 (Note: ASPIS 4p; Elpida 1p)	STOK Elite Division
10	Elpida Astromeriti	26	9	4	13	40	40	0	31	STOK Elite Division
11	Lenas Limassol	26	9	3	14	35	51	−16	30	STOK Elite Division
12	Frenaros FC	26	7	3	16	35	61	−26	24	STOK Elite Division
13	Spartakos Kitiou	26	6	2	18	27	73	−46	20	STOK Elite Division
14	Enosis Kokkinotrimithia	26	1	3	22	19	69	−50	6	STOK Elite Division

Source: League standings at CFA
Rules for classification: 1) points; 2) head-to-head points; 3) head-to-head goal difference; 4) head-to-head away goals scored; 5) goal difference; 6) number of goals scored.
(C) Champions; (O) Play-off winners; (P) Promoted

== Results ==
Home \ Away	ADN	AEN	ALK	ASP	ELP	ENK	IRK	KRE	LSL	LNS	POX	OLL	SPR	FRN
Adonis		3–1	1–3	1–6	3–1	0–5	0–2	3–0	2–1	5–1	2–0	1–1	2–3	1–2
AEN	3–1		1–3	2–2	2–1	2–0	3–0	0–0	0–0	2–1	0–0	1–3	1–0	3–2
Alki	4–1	4–0		1–0	3–1	6–0	2–0	2–2	1–0	4–1	0–0	0–1	4–1	6–1
ASPIS	0–1	1–1	0–1		2–1	4–2	1–3	1–1	0–2	2–0	0–3	1–0	4–1	3–1
Elpida	6–0	0–2	0–2	2–2		6–0	0–2	0–1	1–4	4–1	2–0	1–1	2–3	4–0
Enosis	1–1	3–4	0–2	1–2	0–1		1–2	0–1	0–4	2–3	0–2	0–1	1–1	0–1
Iraklis	2–1	2–0	2–1	4–0	4–1	6–0		0–1	1–1	0–2	3–1	1–2	6–1	3–2
Kouris	1–2	0–0	2–1	1–0	5–1	2–1	0–2		4–2	0–1	1–3	1–1	4–1	4–2
Livadiakos	1–3	2–2	1–2	1–0	1–0	1–1	1–0	3–1		1–1	0–1	2–1	6–2	6–1
Lenas	3–4	0–1	1–4	2–1	1–2	5–0	2–0	0–3	1–0		0–3	1–1	2–0	2–1
POX	4–1	5–2	1–1	3–0	0–0	6–0	4–0	3–1	1–0	7–2		2–1	7–0	4–0
Olympias	0–0	2–0	0–2	0–0	0–1	2–0	1–3	0–0	2–1	2–1	3–0		4–0	4–1
Spartakos	1–0	1–2	0–2	2–2	0–1	2–0	1–2	2–6	0–3	1–0	0–3	0–3		3–1
Frenaros FC	1–3	0–1	0–3	1–1	1–1	2–1	2–0	0–1	4–1	1–1	2–0	1–4	5–1	

Source: Results at CFA
Legend: Blue = home team win; Yellow = draw; Red = away team win.

== See also ==
- Cypriot Fourth Division
- 2014–15 Cypriot First Division
- 2014–15 Cypriot Cup for lower divisions
- Cypriot football league system

== Sources ==
- Official website (in Greek)
- "2014/15 Cypriot Fourth Division". Rec.Sport.Soccer Statistics Foundation. 2016-01-14.
- "League standings" (in Greek). Cyprus Football Association. Archived from the original on December 24, 2015.
- "Results" (in Greek). Cyprus Football Association. Archived from the original on December 24, 2015.
- "Teams" (in Greek). Cyprus Football Association. Archived from the original on December 24, 2015.
- "Scorers" (in Greek). Cyprus Football Association. Archived from the original on December 24, 2015.
