= 2012–13 Cypriot Cup for lower divisions =

Tournament details
- Country: Cyprus
- Dates: 31 October 2012 – 3 April 2013
- Teams: 20

Final positions
- Champions: THOI Lakatamia (1st title)
- Runners-up: ENAD

The 2012–13 Cypriot Cup for lower divisions was the 5th edition of the Cypriot Cup for lower divisions. A total of 20 clubs entered the competition. It began on 26 October 2011 with the first round and concluded on 3 April 2013 with the final which was held at Poli Chrysochous Municipal Stadium. THOI Lakatamia won their 1st cup trophy after beating ENAD Polis Chrysochous 1–0 in the final.

== Format ==
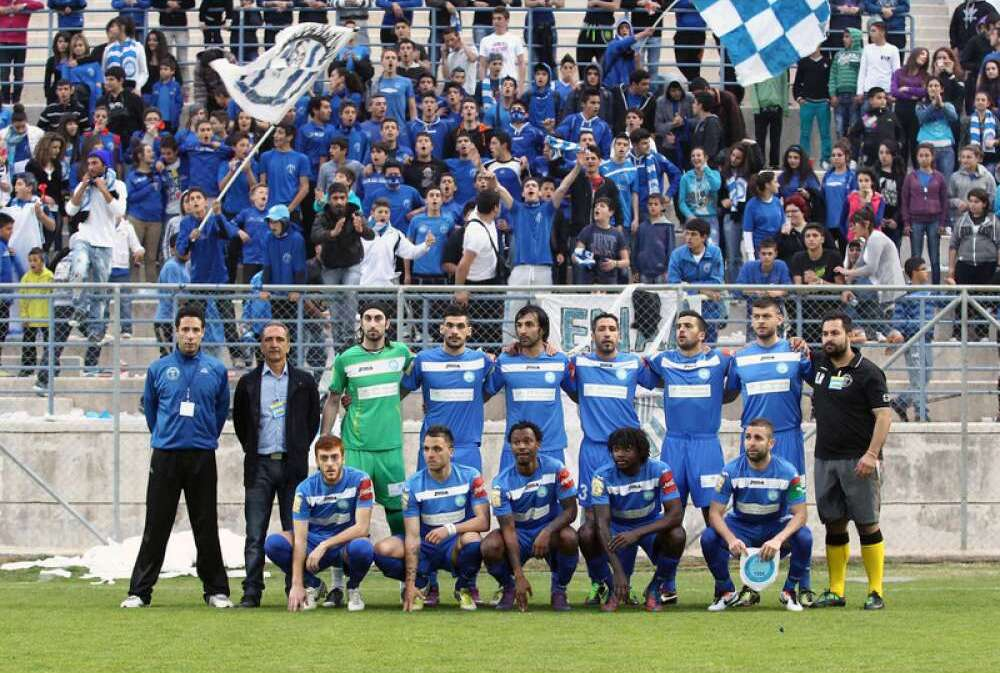
ENAD Polis Chrysochous at the final.

Only teams from the Cypriot Third Division and Cypriot Fourth Division could participate. Participation was not compulsory. 20 of 28 participated that season.

The competition consisted of five rounds. In the first and in the second round each tie was played as a single leg and was held at the home ground of one of the two teams, according to the draw results. Each tie winner was qualifying to the next round. If a match was drawn, extra time was following. If extra time was drawn, there was a replay at the ground of the team who were away for the first game. If the rematch was also drawn, then extra time was following and if the match remained drawn after extra time the winner was decided by penalty shoot-out.

The next two rounds were played in a two-legged format, each team playing a home and an away match against their opponent. The team which scored more goals on aggregate, was qualifying to the next round. If the two teams scored the same number of goals on aggregate, then the team which scored more goals away from home was advancing to the next round.

If both teams had scored the same number of home and away goals, then extra time was following after the end of the second leg match. If during the extra thirty minutes both teams had managed to score, but they had scored the same number of goals, then the team who scored the away goals was advancing to the next round (i.e. the team which was playing away). If there weren't scored any goals during extra time, the qualifying team was determined by penalty shoot-out.

The final was a single match.

== First round ==
12 out of the 20 teams were drawn to qualify directly to the second round, without needing to play any match.

Team 1	Result	Team 2
(C) ASIL Lysi	1 - 0	Elpida Astromeriti (D)
(C) Digenis Oroklinis	4 - 0	Dynamo Pervolion (D)
(D) Livadiakos/Salamina Livadion	2 - 4	MEAP Nisou (D)
(C) Spartakos Kitiou	3 - 0	Digenis Akritas Morphou (C)

== Second round ==
Team 1	Result	Team 2
(D) AEN	6 - 4	Kissos FC Kissonergas (D)
(C) ASIL Lysi	1 - 1 (6 - 5 p.)	Konstantios & Evripidis (D)
(C) Atromitos Yeroskipou	0 - 2	ENTHOI Lakatamia FC (D)
(C) Digenis Oroklinis	2 - 1	Iraklis Gerolakkou (D)
(D) Enosi Neon Ypsona	3 - 3 (3 - 1 p.)	Elpida Xylofagou (C)
(C) ENAD Polis Chrysochous FC	5 - 2	Enosis Neon Parekklisia F.C. (C)
(D) MEAP Nisou	3 - 3 (7 - 6 p.)	Spartakos Kitiou (C)
(C) Frenaros FC 2000	3 - 2	Adonis Idaliou (C)

== Quarter-finals ==
Team 1	Agg.	Team 2	1st leg	2nd leg
(D) AEN	2 - 2	Elpida Xylofagou (C)	1 - 1	1 - 1 (3 - 1 p.)
(C) ENAD Polis Chrysochous	3 - 2	Digenis Oroklinis (C)	2 - 1	1 - 1
(D) ENTHOI Lakatamia FC	6 - 3	Frenaros FC 2000 (C)	4 - 3	2 - 0
(C) Spartakos Kitiou	8 - 1	ASIL Lysi (C)	6 - 1	2 - 0

== Semi-finals ==
Team 1	Agg.	Team 2	1st leg	2nd leg
(D) ENTHOI Lakatamia FC	3 - 2	AEN (D)	3 - 1	0 - 1
(C) ENAD Polis Chrysochous	4 - 1	Spartakos Kitiou (C)	2 - 0	2 - 1

== Final ==
3 April 2013

THOI Lakatamia	1 – 0	ENAD Polis Chrysochous
Maris 61'	(Report)

Poli Chrysochous Municipal Stadium, Polis
Attendance: 1,500
Referee: Andreas Orthodoxou

Cypriot Cup for lower divisions 2012–13 Winners
THOI Lakatamia
1st Title

== Sources ==
- "Cyprus 2012/13". Rec.Sport.Soccer Statistics Foundation. 2016-01-14.
- Official website (in Greek)

== See also ==
- Cypriot Cup for lower divisions
- 2012–13 Cypriot Third Division
- 2012–13 Cypriot Fourth Division
