= 2014–15 Cypriot Third Division =

Cypriot Third Division
- Season: 2014–15
- Champions: THOI (3rd title)
- Promoted: THOI; ASIL; PAEEK FC
- Relegated: Finikas
- Matches played: 181
- Goals scored: 466 (2.57 per match)
- Top goalscorer: Dimos Sokratous (14 goals)

The 2014–15 Cypriot Third Division was the 44th season of the Cypriot third-level football league. THOI Lakatamia won their 3rd title.

== Format ==
Fourteen teams participated in the 2014–15 Cypriot Third Division. All teams played against each other twice, once at their home and once away. The team with the most points at the end of the season crowned champions. The first three teams were promoted to the 2015–16 Cypriot Second Division and the last team was relegated to the 2015–16 Cypriot Fourth Division.

=== Point system ===
Teams received three points for a win, one point for a draw and zero points for a loss.

== Changes from previous season ==
Teams promoted to 2014–15 Cypriot Second Division

- Elpida Xylofagou
- ENAD Polis Chrysochous

Teams relegated from 2013–14 Cypriot Second Division

- PAEEK FC
- ASIL Lysi
- Chalkanoras Idaliou
- Onisilos Sotira^{1}

^{1}Onisillos Sotira were dissolved after the end of the 2013–14 season due to financial problems.

Teams promoted from 2013–14 Cypriot Fourth Division

- Enosi Neon Ypsona^{1}
- Amathus Ayiou Tychona

^{1}Enosi Neon Ypsona merged with Digenis Akritas Ipsona to form ENY-Digenis Ipsona.

Teams relegated to 2014–15 Cypriot Fourth Division

- Spartakos Kitiou
- Adonis Idaliou
- Konstantios & Evripidis Trachoniou

== Stadia and locations ==
2014–15 Cypriot Third Division

Club	Venue
Akritas	Chloraka Municipal Stadium
Amathus	Germasogeia Municipal Stadium
ASIL	Stadium Grigoris Afxentiou
Achyronas	Liopetri Municipal Stadium
Digenis	Makario Stadium
Ethnikos A.	Makario Stadium
Ethnikos L.	Latsia Municipal Stadium
ENY-Digenis	Stelios Chari Stadium
THOI	EN THOI Stadium
MEAP	Theodorio Koinotiko
Ormideia FC	Ormideia Municipal Stadium
PAEEK FC	Stadium Keryneia Epistrophi
Finikas	Euripides Municipal Stadium
Chalkanoras	Chalkanoras Stadium

== League standings ==
Pos	Team	Pld	W	D	L	GF	GA	GD	Pts	Promotion or relegation
1	THOI Lakatamia (C, P)	26	16	8	2	45	19	+26	56	Promoted to Cypriot Second Division
2	ASIL Lysi (P)	26	12	10	4	37	16	+21	46	Promoted to Cypriot Second Division
3	PAEEK FC (P)	26	12	7	7	38	29	+9	43	Promoted to Cypriot Second Division
4	MEAP Nisou	26	11	8	7	34	32	+2	41	
5	ENY-Digenis Ipsona	26	10	8	8	35	32	+3	38	
6	Akritas Chlorakas	26	9	9	8	37	37	0	36	
7	Ethnikos Latsion FC	26	9	7	10	28	31	−3	34	
8	Ethnikos Assia	26	8	9	9	30	36	−6	33	
9	Achyronas Liopetriou	26	8	8	10	31	32	−1	32 (Note: Achyronas: 3pts, 4–3; Amathous: 3pts, 3–4)	
10	Amathus Ayiou Tychona	26	8	8	10	40	47	−7	32	
11	Chalkanoras Idaliou	25	8	6	11	36	38	−2	30 (Note: The match Chalkanoras – Finikas was declared void; it would not be rescheduled, and neither team got any points or goals attributed; it was counted in the matches played column but not in the matches lost column.)	
12	Digenis Morphou	26	7	8	11	25	33	−8	29	
13	Ormideia FC	26	6	10	10	32	38	−6	28	
14	Finikas Ayias Marinas (R)	25	2	4	19	18	46	−28	10	Relegated to STOK Elite Division

Source: League standings at CFA
Rules for classification: 1) points; 2) head-to-head points; 3) head-to-head goal difference; 4) head-to-head away goals scored; 5) goal difference; 6) number of goals scored.
(C) Champions; (P) Promoted; (R) Relegated

== Results ==
Home \ Away	ARK	AMT	ASL	ACR	DGN	ETA	ETL	THL	ENY	MPN	ORM	PKK	FNK	CHL
Akritas		2–2	1–1	1–3	0–0	1–1	3–0	1–2	3–0	1–2	3–2	2–1	3–0	1–1
Amathus	0–2		1–1	2–1	1–2	2–3	2–1	1–1	2–2	2–2	3–1	2–2	1–0	3–1
ASIL Lysi	5–1	2–1		0–0	4–1	4–0	0–0	1–1	0–0	0–2	3–0	3–0	1–1	0–0
Achyronas	1–1	3–1	1–2		1–0	2–0	2–0	0–2	0–0	0–1	1–0	2–3	1–0	0–3 (Note: Achyronas Liopetriou – Chalkanoras awarded 3–0 to Achyronas.)
Digenis	1–2	0–1	0–3	2–1		0–0	1–5	1–3	3–0 (Note: Digenis Morphou – ENY-Digenis Ipsona awarded 3–0 to Digenis.)	1–1	0–0	0–1	3–1	3–0 (Note: Digenis Morphou – Chalkanoras awarded 3–0 to Digenis.)
Ethnikos Assia	1–1	1–1	1–0	1–1	1–0		1–2	1–1	3–3	2–1	1–1	0–1	2–1	1–4
Ethnikos Latsion FC	0–0	1–2	0–1	3–2	2–0	1–0		0–3	0–1	1–1	1–1	1–0	1–0	1–2
THOI Lakatamia	3–1	6–1	0–0	2–1	2–1	3–2	0–0		1–0	0–2	2–2	1–0	2–0	0–0
ENY-Digenis	3–1	2–0	1–2	1–1	1–1	3–0	0–1	1–3		4–0	0–0	2–1	3–1	2–1
MEAP Nisou	4–1	1–0	0–1	0–0	1–1	1–1	1–0	0–1	3–1		1–4	1–4	1–1	1–2
Ormideia FC	1–0	2–2	2–1	1–1	1–1	0–1	2–3	0–0	2–0	1–2		1–2	0–1	5–3
PAEEK FC	1–1	4–3	1–0	1–1	0–0	1–0	2–2	3–0 (Note: PAEEK – THOI Lakatamia awarded 3–0 to PAEEK.)	1–1	2–2	4–0		0–2	1–0
Finikas	1–2	0–3	0–1	1–3	0–1	1–4	2–2	0–3	1–2	1–2	1–2	0–1		2–2
Chalkanoras	1–2	4–1	1–1	4–2	1–2	0–2	2–0	0–3	1–2	0–1	1–1	2–1	– (Note: Chalkanoras – Finikas was declared void; it was not rescheduled and neither team got any points or goals attributed; it was counted in the matches played column but not in the matches lost column.)	

Source: Results at CFA
Legend: Blue = home team win; Yellow = draw; Red = away team win.

== Sources ==
- "2014/15 Cypriot Third Division". Rec.Sport.Soccer Statistics Foundation. 2016-01-14.
- "League standings" (in Greek). Cyprus Football Association. Archived from the original on December 23, 2015.
- "Results" (in Greek). Cyprus Football Association. Archived from the original on December 23, 2015.
- "Teams" (in Greek). Cyprus Football Association. Archived from the original on December 23, 2015.
- "Scorers" (in Greek). Cyprus Football Association. Archived from the original on December 23, 2015.

== See also ==
- Cypriot Third Division
- 2014–15 Cypriot First Division
- 2014–15 Cypriot Cup for lower divisions
