= 2013–14 Cypriot Third Division =

Cypriot Third Division
- Season: 2013–14
- Champions: Elpida (2nd title)
- Promoted: Elpida; ENAD
- Relegated: Spartakos; Adonis; K&E Trachoniou
- Matches played: 182
- Goals scored: 518 (2.85 per match)
- Top goalscorer: Taxiarchis Thanelas (19 goals)

The 2013–14 Cypriot Third Division was the 43rd season of the Cypriot third-level football league. Elpida Xylofagou won their 2nd title.

== Format ==
Fourteen teams participated in the 2013–14 Cypriot Third Division. All teams played against each other twice, once at their home and once away. The team with the most points at the end of the season crowned champions. The first two teams were promoted to the 2014–15 Cypriot Second Division and the last three teams were relegated to the 2014–15 Cypriot Fourth Division.

=== Point system ===
Teams received three points for a win, one point for a draw and zero points for a loss.

== Changes from previous season ==
Teams promoted to 2013–14 Cypriot Second Division

- Karmiotissa Polemidion
- Enosis Neon Parekklisia
- Digenis Oroklinis
- ASIL Lysi

Teams relegated from 2012–13 Cypriot Second Division

- Akritas Chlorakas
- Ethnikos Assia

Teams promoted from 2012–13 Cypriot Fourth Division

- MEAP Nisou
- Finikas Ayias Marinas
- THOI Lakatamia
- Konstantios & Evripidis Trachoniou

Teams relegated to 2013–14 Cypriot Fourth Division

- Frenaros FC
- Atromitos Yeroskipou

== Stadia and locations ==
2013–14 Cypriot Third Division

Club	Venue
Adonis	Adonis Idaliou Stadium
Akritas	Chloraka Municipal Stadium
Achyronas	Liopetri Municipal Stadium
Digenis	Makario Stadium
Ethnikos A.	Makario Stadium
Ethnikos L.	Latsia Municipal Stadium
Elpida	Michalonikion Stadium
ENAD	Poli Chrysochous Municipal Stadium
THOI	EN THOI Stadium
Konstantios & Evripidis	Trachoni Municipal Stadium
MEAP	Theodorio Koinotiko
Ormideia FC	Ormideia Municipal Stadium
Spartakos	Kiti Municipal Stadium
Finikas	Euripides Municipal Stadium

== League standings ==
Pos	Team	Pld	W	D	L	GF	GA	GD	Pts	Promotion or relegation
1	Elpida Xylofagou (C, P)	26	18	8	0	43	10	+33	62	Promoted to Cypriot Second Division
2	ENAD Polis Chrysochous (P)	26	18	6	2	59	20	+39	60	Promoted to Cypriot Second Division
3	THOI Lakatamia	26	16	6	4	58	24	+34	54	
4	Achyronas Liopetriou	26	14	3	9	42	25	+17	45	
5	MEAP Nisou	26	12	2	12	35	40	−5	38	
6	Ormideia FC	26	9	9	8	32	31	+1	36 (Note: Ormideia: 4pts; Finikas: 1pt)	
7	Finikas Ayias Marinas	26	10	6	10	41	40	+1	36	
8	Ethnikos Assia	26	10	5	11	37	46	−9	35	
9	Akritas Chlorakas	26	9	5	12	25	35	−10	32	
10	Ethnikos Latsion FC	26	7	9	10	27	38	−11	30	
11	Digenis Morphou	26	6	7	13	24	40	−16	25 (Note: Digenis: 6pts; Spartakos: 0pts)	
12	Spartakos Kitiou (R)	26	7	4	15	31	52	−21	25	Relegated to Cypriot Fourth Division
13	Adonis Idaliou (R)	26	4	5	17	33	51	−18	17	Relegated to Cypriot Fourth Division
14	Konstantios & Evripidis Trachoniou (R)	26	3	3	20	31	66	−35	12	Relegated to Cypriot Fourth Division

Source: League standings at CFA
Rules for classification: 1) points; 2) head-to-head points; 3) head-to-head goal difference; 4) head-to-head away goals scored; 5) goal difference; 6) number of goals scored.
(C) Champions; (P) Promoted; (R) Relegated

== Results ==
Home \ Away	ADN	AKR	ACR	DGN	THL	ETA	ETL	ELP	ENAD	KET	MEP	ORM	SPR	FNK
Adonis		1–2	0–2	1–4	1–1	2–4	3–1	0–1	1–3	4–2	1–2	2–1	1–1	1–2
Akritas	2–1		1–0	1–3	0–3	1–0	0–1	0–1	0–3	1–0	2–0	0–1	1–0	0–0
Achyronas	2–1	2–0		1–0	2–0	5–3	1–1	0–1	1–3	4–0	3–0	1–2	4–2	1–0
Digenis	2–3	0–0	0–3		1–4	0–0	2–2	0–0	0–2	5–0	1–0	0–0	1–0	0–3
THOI	1–1	3–2	2–0	3–0		0–0	3–0	0–0	2–2	3–3	2–0	2–1	3–1	3–1
Ethnikos Assia	1–0	2–2	0–1	3–1	0–3		0–0	1–4	1–2	2–1	1–0	2–0	3–1	1–2
Ethnikos Latsion FC	1–1	3–1	0–0	1–0	0–1	2–3		0–2	1–1	4–2	2–1	1–1	1–1	0–2
Elpida Xylofagou	3–1	1–0	2–0	3–0	3–1	2–1	3–0 (Note: Elpida – Ethnikos Latsion: original score 0–1; awarded 3–0.)		0–0	3–0	1–1	1–1	3–0	3–1
ENAD	1–0	1–1	2–1	3–1	3–2	7–0	2–0	0–0		4–1	2–0	3–0	5–0	1–1
K & E	2–1	0–2	0–3	4–0	0–3	0–2	0–2	0–0	1–2		2–3	1–3	3–2	4–5
MEAP	2–0	3–2	2–1	2–2	0–3 (Note: MEAP – ENTHOI Lakatamia: original score 1–0; awarded 0–3)	1–2	1–2	0–1	3–5	2–1		2–1	3–1	3–1
Ormideia FC	2–2	2–2	0–0	1–0	1–3	3–0 (Note: Ormideia FC – Ethnikos Assia: original score 3–3; awarded 3–0.)	1–1	1–2	2–1	2–1	0–1		2–1	3–1
Spartakos	2–1	3–0	2–1	0–1	0–6	3–2	2–0	1–2	1–0	2–2	1–2	1–1		2–0
Finikas	4–3	1–2	1–3	0–0	2–1	3–3	4–1	1–1	0–1	2–1	0–1	0–0	4–1	

Source: Results at CFA
Legend: Blue = home team win; Yellow = draw; Red = away team win.

== See also ==
- Cypriot Third Division
- 2013–14 Cypriot First Division
- 2013–14 Cypriot Cup for lower divisions

== Sources ==
- "2013/14 Cypriot Third Division". Rec.Sport.Soccer Statistics Foundation. 2016-01-14.
- "League standings" (in Greek). Cyprus Football Association. Archived from the original on 2015-12-23.
- "Results" (in Greek). Cyprus Football Association. Archived from the original on 2015-12-23.
- "Teams" (in Greek). Cyprus Football Association. Archived from the original on 2015-12-23.
- "Scorers" (in Greek). Cyprus Football Association. Archived from the original on 2015-12-23.
