= 2015–16 Cypriot Second Division =

Cypriot Second Division
- Season: 2015–16
- Champions: Karmiotissa (1st title)
- Promoted: Karmiotissa; AEZ; Anagennisi
- Relegated: Elpida; N&S Erimis; Digenis
- Matches: 182
- Goals: 509 (2.8 per match)
- Top goalscorer: Andreas Kyprianou (22 goals)
- Longest winning run: 11 matches Olympiakos
- Longest unbeaten run: 23 matches Anagennisi
- Longest winless run: 25 matches Digenis
- Longest losing run: 12 matches N&S Erimis
- All statistics correct as of 26 March 2016.

The 2015–16 Cypriot Second Division was the 61st season of the Cypriot second-level football league. It began on 18 September 2015 and ended on 26 March 2016. Karmiotissa won their first title.

== Team changes from 2014–15 ==
Teams promoted to 2015–16 Cypriot First Division

- Enosis Neon Paralimni
- Pafos FC
- Aris Limassol

Teams relegated from 2014–15 Cypriot First Division

- Othellos Athienou

Teams promoted from 2014–15 Cypriot Third Division

- THOI Lakatamia
- ASIL Lysi
- PAEEK

Teams relegated to 2015–16 Cypriot Third Division

- APEP

== Stadia and locations ==
Location of clubs in 2014–15 Cypriot Second Division

Note: Table lists clubs in alphabetical order.

Club	Location	Venue	Capacity
AEZ	Zakaki, Limassol	Zakaki Community Stadium	2,000
Anagennisi	Deryneia, Famagusta	Anagennisi Football Ground	5,800
ASIL	Larnaca	Grigoris Afxentiou Stadium	2,000
Digenis	Oroklini, Larnaca	Koinotiko Stadio Oroklinis	1,500
Elpida	Xylofagou, Larnaca	Michalonikeio Stadio Xylofagou	2,000
ENAD	Polis, Paphos	Dimotiko Stadio Polis Chrysochous	1,300
EN Parekklisia	Parekklisia, Limassol	Parekklisias Stadium	3,000
Karmiotissa	Pano Polemidia, Limassol	Pano Polemidia Municipal Stadium	1,500
Nikos & Sokratis	Erimi, Limassol	Erimi Community Stadium	1,000
Olympiakos	Nicosia	Makario Stadium	16,000
Omonia Ar.	Aradippou, Larnaca	Aradippou Stadium	2,500
Othellos	Athienou, Larnaca	Othellos Athienou Stadium	2,500
PAEEK	Lakatamia, Nicosia	Keryneia Epistrophi Stadium	2,000
THOI	Lakatamia, Nicosia	EN THOI Stadium	3,500

== League table ==
Pos	Team	Pld	W	D	L	GF	GA	GD	Pts	Promotion or relegation
1	Karmiotissa (C, P)	26	20	1	5	54	19	+35	61	Promoted to Cypriot First Division
2	AEZ Zakakiou (P)	26	19	3	4	47	18	+29	60	Promoted to Cypriot First Division
3	Anagennisi Deryneia (P)	26	17	8	1	50	18	+32	59 (Note: DER 2–0 OLY; OLY 1–1 DER)	Promoted to Cypriot First Division
4	Olympiakos Nicosia (Note: Olympiakos Nicosia started the competition with three points deduction because they did not meet the financial criteria.)	26	20	2	4	51	19	+32	59	
5	Othellos Athienou	26	17	5	4	55	24	+31	56	
6	THOI Lakatamia	26	11	2	13	44	48	−4	35	
7	ENAD Polis Chrysochous	26	9	6	11	30	32	−2	33 (Note: ENAD 4–1 PAEEK; PAEEK 1–0 ENAD)	
8	PAEEK	26	10	3	13	32	29	+3	33	
9	Omonia Aradippou (Note: On 11 March 2016, Omonia Aradippou were deducted two points because they did not meet the financial criteria.)	26	9	5	12	28	29	−1	30	
10	Enosis Neon Parekklisia	26	6	8	12	34	37	−3	26	
11	ASIL Lysi	26	6	7	13	31	36	−5	25	
12	Elpida Xylofagou (R)	26	3	6	17	24	60	−36	15	Relegated to Cypriot Third Division
13	Nikos & Sokratis Erimis (R)	26	2	3	21	13	79	−66	9	Relegated to Cypriot Third Division
14	Digenis Oroklinis (R)	26	1	5	20	16	61	−45	8	Relegated to Cypriot Third Division

Source: CFA, Soccerway
Rules for classification: 1) points; 2) head-to-head points; 3) head-to-head goal difference; 4) head-to-head away goals scored; 5) goal difference; 6) number of goals scored
(C) Champions; (P) Promoted; (R) Relegated

== Sources ==
- "2015/16 Cypriot Second Division". Rec.Sport.Soccer Statistics Foundation. 2016-01-14.
