= 2016–17 Cypriot Third Division =

Cypriot Third Division
- Season: 2016–17
- Champions: P.O. Xylotymbou (1st title)
- Promoted: P.O. Xylotymbou; Digenis Oroklinis; Chalkanoras
- Relegated: Iraklis Gerolakkou; Elpida Xylofagou; AEN
- Matches: 240
- Goals: 677 (2.82 per match)
- Top goalscorer: Antreas Anastasiou (22 goals)
- Biggest home win: Ethnikos 6–0 Iraklis (12 November 2016)
- Biggest away win: Olympias 0–7 Ethnikos (29 April 2017)
- Highest scoring: ENY-Digenis 5–4 Elpida (30 April 2017)
- All statistics correct as of 30 April 2017.

The 2016–17 Cypriot Third Division was the 46th season of the Cypriot third-level football league. P.O. Xylotymbous won their 1st title.

== Format ==
Sixteen teams participated in the 2016–17 Cypriot Third Division. All teams played against each other twice, once at their home and once away. The team with the most points at the end of the season crowned champions. The first three teams were promoted to the 2016–17 Cypriot Second Division and the last three teams were relegated to the 2016–17 STOK Elite Division. However, after the end of the season Nikos & Sokratis Erimis withdrew from the 2016–17 Cypriot Third Division, and so the 14th-placed team remained to Third Division.

=== Point system ===
Teams received three points for a win, one point for a draw and zero points for a loss.

== Changes from previous season ==
Teams promoted to 2016–17 Cypriot Second Division

- Akritas Chlorakas
- Alki Oroklini
- Ethnikos Assia

Teams relegated from 2015–16 Cypriot Second Division

- Elpida Xylofagou
- Nikos & Sokratis Erimis
- Digenis Oroklinis

Teams promoted from 2015–16 STOK Elite Division

- Livadiakos/Salamina Livadion
- Peyia 2014
- AEN Ayiou Georgiou Vrysoullon-Acheritou

Teams relegated to 2016–17 STOK Elite Division

- Kouris Erimis
- Amathus Ayiou Tychona

== Stadia and locations ==
Locations of the 2016–17 Cypriot Third Division teams.

| Club | Venue |
|---|---|
| Achyronas | Liopetri Municipal Stadium |
| AEN Ayiou Georgiou Vrysoullon-Acheritou | Olympos Acheritou Stadium |
| APEP | Kyperounda Municipal Stadium |
| Chalkanoras | Chalkanoras Stadium |
| Digenis Akritas Morphou | Makario Stadium |
| Digenis Oroklinis | Koinotiko Stadio Oroklinis |
| Ethnikos L. | Latsia Municipal Stadium |
| Elpida | Michalonikeio Stadio Xylofagou |
| ENY-Digenis | Stelios Chari Stadium |
| Iraklis Gerolakkou | Kykkos Stadium |
| Livadiakos/Salamina Livadion | Ayia Pasaskevi Livadion Municipality Stadium |
| MEAP | Theodorio Koinotiko |
| Olympias Lympion | Olympias Lympion Stadium |
| Ormideia FC | Ormideia Municipal Stadium |
| Peyia 2014 | Peyia Municipal Stadium |
| P.O. Xylotymbou | Xylotympou Municipal Stadium |

== League standings ==
| Pos | Team | Pld | W | D | L | GF | GA | GD | Pts | Qualification or relegation |
|---|---|---|---|---|---|---|---|---|---|---|
| 1 | P.O. Xylotymbou (C, P) | 30 | 22 | 4 | 4 | 54 | 22 | +32 | 70 | Promotion to the Cypriot Second Division |
| 2 | Digenis Oroklinis (P) | 30 | 16 | 9 | 5 | 57 | 35 | +22 | 57 | Promotion to the Cypriot Second Division |
| 3 | Chalkanoras Idaliou (P) | 30 | 16 | 8 | 6 | 52 | 39 | +13 | 56 | Promotion to the Cypriot Second Division |
| 4 | Ethnikos Latsion | 30 | 15 | 9 | 6 | 59 | 25 | +34 | 54 | |
| 5 | Olympias Lympion | 30 | 13 | 7 | 10 | 42 | 47 | −5 | 46 | |
| 6 | Enosi Neon Ypsona-Digenis Ipsona | 30 | 12 | 7 | 11 | 42 | 45 | −3 | 43 | |
| 7 | Digenis Akritas Morphou | 30 | 12 | 6 | 12 | 48 | 48 | 0 | 42 | |
| 8 | Achyronas Liopetriou | 30 | 11 | 6 | 13 | 38 | 38 | 0 | 39 | |
| 9 | Peyia 2014 | 30 | 10 | 8 | 12 | 41 | 38 | +3 | 38 | |
| 10 | MEAP Nisou | 30 | 9 | 9 | 12 | 34 | 44 | −10 | 36 | |
| 11 | Ormideia FC | 30 | 10 | 5 | 15 | 30 | 34 | −4 | 35 (Note: Heaf to head record: Ormideia 3–1 APEP, APEP 1–0.) | |
| 12 | APEP FC | 30 | 8 | 11 | 11 | 32 | 40 | −8 | 35 | |
| 13 | Livadiakos/Salamina Livadion | 30 | 9 | 7 | 14 | 44 | 48 | −4 | 34 | |
| 14 | Iraklis Gerolakkou (R) | 30 | 8 | 8 | 14 | 41 | 48 | −7 | 32 | Relegation to the STOK Elite Division |
| 15 | Elpida Xylofagou (R) | 30 | 8 | 5 | 17 | 36 | 54 | −18 | 29 | Relegation to the STOK Elite Division |
| 16 | AEN Ayiou Georgiou Vrysoullon-Acheritou (R) | 30 | 5 | 3 | 22 | 27 | 71 | −44 | 18 | Relegation to the STOK Elite Division |

Source: CFA
Rules for classification: 1) Points; 2) Head-to-head points; 3) Head-to-head goal difference; 4) Head-to-head goals scored; 5) Head-to-head away goals scored (only if two teams); 6) Goal difference; 7) Goals scored; 8) Play-off (only if deciding championship round, relegation round or relegation).
(C) Champions; (P) Promoted; (R) Relegated

== Results ==
| Home \ Away | ACH | AEN | APEP | CHA | DMO | DOR | ETH | ELP | ENY | IRA | LSL | MEAP | OLY | OFC | PEY | POX |
|---|---|---|---|---|---|---|---|---|---|---|---|---|---|---|---|---|
| Achyronas Liopetriou | — | 3–2 | 1–0 | 3–1 | 1–4 | 1–2 | 0–2 | 3–0 | 2–1 | 2–1 | 2–2 | 2–2 | 3–0 | 1–2 | 0–1 | 2–1 |
| AEN Ayiou Georgiou Vrysoullon-Acheritou | 1–0 | — | 1–1 | 1–2 | 2–2 | 2–1 | 0–4 | 0–3 | 2–1 | 0–1 | 1–2 | 3–2 | 1–3 | 0–0 | 3–2 | 1–3 |
| APEP | 2–1 | 3–0 | — | 1–2 | 3–1 | 2–3 | 0–0 | 0–2 | 3–1 | 1–0 | 1–1 | 0–0 | 1–1 | 1–0 | 1–1 | 0–3 |
| Chalkanoras Idaliou | 1–0 | 3–2 | 0–0 | — | 1–4 | 1–0 | 1–0 | 3–2 | 2–2 | 1–0 | 5–3 | 5–1 | 2–2 | 1–1 | 2–0 | 1–1 |
| Digenis Akritas Morphou | 1–2 | 3–0 | 3–0 | 1–3 | — | 4–2 | 2–2 | 1–0 | 1–2 | 5–2 | 0–4 | 2–1 | 0–1 | 0–2 | 0–0 | 0–2 |
| Digenis Oroklinis | 0–0 | 4–0 | 3–3 | 1–0 | 5–2 | — | 1–1 | 3–0 | 2–1 | 5–3 | 1–0 | 0–0 | 3–1 | 3–0 | 2–1 | 3–2 |
| Ethnikos Latsion | 0–0 | 3–0 | 3–1 | 1–2 | 4–0 | 2–2 | — | 2–2 | 5–0 | 6–0 | 1–0 | 1–1 | 2–4 | 2–1 | 1–0 | 2–1 |
| Elpida Xylofagou | 2–1 | 2–1 | 3–2 | 0–1 | 1–1 | 0–0 | 1–4 | — | 1–2 | 1–1 | 1–1 | 0–3 | 0–1 | 1–0 | 0–1 | 0–1 |
| ENY-Digenis | 3–0 | 4–0 | 0–1 | 0–0 | 0–0 | 1–4 | 2–0 | 5–4 | — | 1–1 | 3–1 | 0–3 | 2–1 | 2–2 | 2–0 | 1–0 |
| Iraklis Gerolakkou | 1–0 | 4–0 | 1–1 | 0–1 | 1–2 | 1–1 | 0–0 | 4–1 | 1–2 | — | 1–0 | 2–2 | 0–1 | 3–1 | 2–0 | 1–2 |
| Livadiakos/Salamina Livadion | 0–0 | 3–2 | 0–1 | 3–1 | 1–1 | 2–2 | 2–3 | 2–3 | 4–1 | 2–1 | — | 2–2 | 0–2 | 2–1 | 2–1 | 1–3 |
| MEAP Nisou | 0–2 | 2–1 | 1–1 | 1–4 | 0–2 | 0–1 | 1–0 | 2–1 | 0–1 | 3–4 | 2–0 | — | 1–0 | 0–1 | 1–1 | 1–1 |
| Olympias Lympion | 2–1 | 3–1 | 0–0 | 2–2 | 1–3 | 1–1 | 0–7 | 3–2 | 2–0 | 3–3 | 1–0 | 0–1 | — | 1–0 | 2–1 | 0–1 |
| Ormideia FC | 1–3 | 3–0 | 3–1 | 2–2 | 0–2 | 0–1 | 0–1 | 1–2 | 1–0 | 2–1 | 1–2 | 2–0 | 2–1 | — | 2–1 | 0–1 |
| Peyia 2014 | 2–2 | 1–0 | 4–1 | 3–1 | 3–0 | 3–1 | 0–0 | 2–0 | 2–2 | 0–0 | 3–2 | 0–1 | 4–1 | 0–0 | — | 1–2 |
| P.O. Xylotymbou | 1–0 | 4–0 | 1–0 | 2–1 | 2–1 | 1–0 | 1–0 | 3–1 | 0–0 | 2–1 | 1–0 | 5–0 | 1–1 | 1–0 | 5–3 | — |

Source: Cyprus Football Association
Legend: Blue = home team win; Yellow = draw; Red = away team win.
For upcoming matches, an "a" indicates there is an article about the rivalry between the two participants.

== Season statistics ==
=== Top scorers ===
Including matches played on 30 April 2017; Source: Cyprus Football Association

| Rank | Player | Club | Goals |
|---|---|---|---|
| 1 | (Cyprus) Antreas Anastasiou | D. Oroklinis | 22 |
| 2 | (Venezuela) Héctor González | P.O. Xylotymbou | 18 |
| 3 | (England) Omar Rowe | Ethnikos L. | 17 |
| 4 | (Cyprus) Pantelis Tavrou | P.O. Xylotymbou | 14 |
| 5 | (Cyprus) Christos Makris | Peyia 2014 | 12 |
| 5 | (Cyprus) Nikolas Papazaxariou | MEAP | 12 |
| 5 | (Cyprus) Andreas Christodoulou | Elpida | 12 |
| 8 | (Cyprus) Nikolas Peppos | Livadiakos | 11 |
| 9 | (Cyprus) Konstantinos Dionisiou | Chalkanoras | 10 |
| 9 | (Ghana) George Ohenebeng | D. Morphou | 10 |
| 9 | (Cyprus) Michalakis Kalogirou | AEN | 10 |
| 9 | (Cyprus) Nikolas Christofides | Peyia 2014 | 10 |

== Sources ==
- "2015/16 Cypriot Third Division". Rec.Sport.Soccer Statistics Foundation. 2016-10-14.
- "League standings" (in Greek). Cyprus Football Association.
- "Results" (in Greek). Cyprus Football Association. Archived from the original on 2017-10-08.
- "Teams" (in Greek). Cyprus Football Association.
- "Scorers" (in Greek). Cyprus Football Association.

== See also ==
- Cypriot Third Division
- 2016–17 Cypriot First Division
- 2016–17 Cypriot Second Division
- 2016–17 Cypriot Cup for lower divisions
