= 2012–13 Cypriot Third Division =

Cypriot Third Division
- Season: 2012–13
- Champions: Karmiotissa (1st title)
- Promoted: Karmiotissa; EN Parekklisia; Digenis Or. ASIL
- Relegated: Frenaros; Atromitos
- Matches played: 182
- Goals scored: 494 (2.71 per match)
- Top goalscorer: Marios Grouni (22 goals)

The 2012–13 Cypriot Third Division was the 42nd season of the Cypriot third-level football league. Karmiotissa Polemidion won their 1st title.

== Format ==
Fourteen teams participated in the 2012–13 Cypriot Third Division. All teams played against each other twice, once at their home and once away. The team with the most points at the end of the season crowned champions. The first four teams were promoted to the 2013–14 Cypriot B2 Division and the last two teams were relegated to the 2013–14 Cypriot Fourth Division.

=== Point system ===
Teams received three points for a win, one point for a draw and zero points for a loss.

== Changes from previous season ==
Teams promoted to 2012–13 Cypriot Second Division

- AEK Kouklia
- Nikos & Sokratis Erimis
- AEZ Zakakiou

Teams relegated from 2011–12 Cypriot Second Division

- APOP Kinyras^{1}
- Enosis Neon Parekklisia
- Atromitos Yeroskipou

^{1}APOP Kinyras was relegated to the 2012–13 Cypriot Fourth Division after FIFA's decision.

Teams promoted from 2011–12 Cypriot Fourth Division

- Digenis Oroklinis
- Karmiotissa Polemidion
- Ethnikos Latsion FC

Teams relegated to 2012–13 Cypriot Fourth Division

- Anagennisi Germasogeias^{1}
- POL/AE Maroni^{2}

^{1}Anagennisi Germasogeias withdrew from 2012–13 Cypriot Fourth Division.

^{2}POL/AE Maroni withdrew from 2011–12 Cypriot Third Division.

== Stadia and locations ==
2012–13 Cypriot Third Division

Club	Venue
Adonis	Adonis Idaliou Stadium
ASIL	Stadium Grigoris Afxentiou
Atromitos	Geroskipou Municipality Stadium
Achyronas	Liopetri Municipal Stadium
Digenis M.	Makario Stadium
Digenis Or.	Oroklini Municipal Stadium
Ethnikos L.	Latsia Municipal Stadium
Elpida	Michalonikion Stadium
ENAD	Poli Chrysochous Municipal Stadium
EN Parekklisia	Parekklisia Municipal Stadium
Karmiotissa	Pano Polemidia Municipal Stadium
Ormideia FC	Ormideia Municipal Stadium
Spartakos	Kiti Municipal Stadium
Frenaros FC	Frenaros Municipal Stadium

== League standings ==
Pos	Team	Pld	W	D	L	GF	GA	GD	Pts	Promotion or relegation
1	Karmiotissa Polemidion (C, P)	26	17	5	4	49	19	+30	56	Promoted to Cypriot B2 Division
2	Enosis Neon Parekklisia (P)	26	15	8	3	54	20	+34	53	Promoted to Cypriot B2 Division
3	Digenis Oroklinis (P)	26	14	9	3	40	26	+14	51	Promoted to Cypriot B2 Division
4	ASIL Lysi (P)	26	15	5	6	41	22	+19	50	Promoted to Cypriot B2 Division
5	ENAD Polis Chrysochous	26	12	9	5	39	22	+17	45	
6	Spartakos Kitiou	26	12	5	9	38	37	+1	41	
7	Adonis Idaliou	26	9	10	7	38	35	+3	37	
8	Ethnikos Latsion FC	26	8	5	13	27	34	−7	29	
9	Ormideia FC	26	7	6	13	33	33	0	27	
10	Achyronas Liopetriou	26	5	8	13	26	55	−29	23	
11	Elpida Xylofagou	26	4	10	12	22	43	−21	22 (Note: Elpida: 4pts; Digenis: 1pt)	
12	Digenis Morphou	26	5	7	14	27	43	−16	22	
13	Frenaros FC (R)	26	5	6	15	32	52	−20	21	Relegated to Cypriot Fourth Division
14	Atromitos Yeroskipou (R)	26	5	5	16	28	53	−25	17 (Note: Atromitos Yeroskipou had 3 points deducted.)	Relegated to Cypriot Fourth Division

Source: rsssf.com
Rules for classification: 1) points; 2) head-to-head points; 3) head-to-head goal difference; 4) head-to-head away goals scored; 5) goal difference; 6) number of goals scored.
(C) Champions; (P) Promoted; (R) Relegated

== Results ==
Home \ Away	ADN	ASL	ATR	ACR	DGM	DGO	ETL	ELP	END	ENP	KRM	ORM	SPR	FRN
Adonis		0–1	7–5	3–2	2–1	2–2	0–0	2–1	0–0	1–1	1–2	1–0	1–1	3–1
ASIL	0–1		2–1	3–0	4–0	1–2	1–0	4–1	1–1	2–2	0–0	1–0	0–1	3–2
Atromitos	3–3	1–2		2–1	2–0	0–0	0–1	2–2	0–1	0–2	2–1	1–0	2–2	2–1
Achyronas	2–5	0–2	3–0		2–0	0–0	1–2	0–2	0–3	1–1	2–1	1–1	2–1	0–0
Digenis M.	0–1	0–1	3–0	6–2		1–1	1–1	1–2	3–2	0–0	0–0	1–1	1–4	1–0
Digenis Or.	1–0	3–1	1–1	1–1	3–1		3–2	4–0	1–1	1–1	1–0	2–1	0–1	2–0
Ethnikos	0–0	1–2	2–1	1–1	1–0	0–1		3–2	1–3	1–2	2–3	2–0	0–1	1–1
Elpida	1–1	1–1	1–0	1–1	0–0	1–1	0–2		1–1	1–3	1–1	0–4	0–2	0–0
ENAD	1–0	0–3	4–0	3–0	2–2	1–3	3–1	1–0		0–0	0–0	1–0	5–0	3–0
ENP	3–1	1–0	1–0	9–0	3–2	4–0	0–1	4–0	4–1		0–1	1–1	2–0	4–1
Karmiotissa	1–1	1–0	4–0	4–0	3–1	3–0	1–0	2–0	2–1	1–0		4–0	3–2	2–0
Ormideia FC	3–0	1–3	2–1	0–1	0–1	1–2	2–0	1–1	0–1	1–1	1–2		4–0	3–2
Spartakos	1–0	1–1	4–1	3–2	4–1	0–1	3–1	0–2	0–0	0–1	1–5	1–1		2–1
Frenaros FC	2–2	1–2	3–1	1–1	2–0	2–4	2–1	2–1	0–0	3–4	3–2	2–5	0–3	

Source: rsssf.com
Legend: Blue = home team win; Yellow = draw; Red = away team win.

== See also ==
- Cypriot Third Division
- 2012–13 Cypriot First Division
- 2012–13 Cypriot Cup for lower divisions

== Sources ==
- "2012/13 Cypriot Third Division". Rec.Sport.Soccer Statistics Foundation. 2016-01-14.
- "League standings" (in Greek). Cyprus Football Association. Archived from the original on 2014-07-29.
- "Results" (in Greek). Cyprus Football Association. Archived from the original on 2014-07-29.
- "Teams" (in Greek). Cyprus Football Association. Archived from the original on 2013-07-20.
- "Scorers" (in Greek). Cyprus Football Association. Archived from the original on 2015-12-23.
