= 2014–15 Cypriot Second Division =

Cypriot Second Division
- Season: 2014–15
- Champions: EN Paralimni (2nd title)
- Promoted: EN Paralimni; Pafos FC; Aris
- Relegated: APEP
- Matches: 182
- Goals: 462 (2.54 per match)
- Top goalscorer: Chris Dickson (19 goals)
- All statistics correct as of 8 April 2015.

The 2014–15 Cypriot Second Division was the 60th season of the Cypriot second-level football league and it began on 20 September 2014. There was a new league system in place with the eight teams of the B1 Division, merging with the eight teams of the B2 Division, creating a unified Second Division. Before the season, Alki Larnaca was dissolved due to financial problems and AEK Kouklia and AEP Paphos merged to create Pafos FC, reducing the total of clubs competing from 16 to 14. Enosis Neon Paralimni won their 2nd title.

== Team Changes from 2013–14 ==
Teams promoted to 2014–15 Cypriot First Division

- Ayia Napa
- Othellos Athienou

Teams relegated from 2013–14 Cypriot First Division

- AEK Kouklia
- Alki Larnaca
- Aris Limassol
- Enosis Neon Paralimni

Teams promoted from 2013–14 Cypriot Third Division

- Elpida Xylofagou
- ENAD Polis Chrysochous

Teams relegated to 2014–15 Cypriot Third Division

- ASIL Lysi
- Chalkanoras Idaliou
- Onisilos Sotira
- PAEEK

== Stadia and locations ==
Location of clubs in 2014–15 Cypriot Second Division

Note: Table lists clubs in alphabetical order.

Club	Location	Venue	Capacity
AEZ	Zakaki, Limassol	Zakaki Municipal Stadium	2,000
Anagennisi	Deryneia, Famagusta	Anagennisi Football Ground	5,800
APEP	Kyperounta, Limassol District	Kyperounda Stadium	6,000
Aris	Limassol	Tsirion Stadium	13,331
Digenis V.	Oroklini, Larnaca	Koinotiko Stadio Oroklinis	1,500
Elpida	Xylofagou, Larnaca	Michalonikeio Stadio Xylofagou	2,000
ENAD	Polis, Paphos	Dimotiko Stadio Polis Chrysochous	1,000
EN Paralimni	Paralimni	Tasos Markou Stadium	5,800
EN Parekklisia	Parekklisia, Limassol	Parekklisias Stadium	3,000
Karmiotissa	Pano Polemidia, Limassol	Pano Polemidia Municipal Stadium	1,500
Nikos & Sokratis	Erimi, Limassol	Erimi Community Stadium	1,000
Olympiakos	Nicosia	Makario Stadium	16,000
Omonia Ar.	Aradippou, Larnaca	Aradippou Stadium	2,500
Pafos FC	Paphos	Geroskipou Stadium	2,000

== League table ==
Pos	Team	Pld	W	D	L	GF	GA	GD	Pts	Promotion or relegation
1	Enosis Neon Paralimni (C, P)	26	19	6	1	57	13	+44	63	Promoted to Cypriot First Division
2	Pafos FC (P)	26	19	5	2	55	19	+36	62	Promoted to Cypriot First Division
3	Aris Limassol (Note: On 24 December 2014, Aris Limassol were deducted three points because they did not meet the financial criteria.) (P)	26	16	4	6	35	25	+10	49	Promoted to Cypriot First Division
4	AEZ Zakakiou	26	12	8	6	29	19	+10	44	
5	Karmiotissa	26	12	2	12	36	29	+7	38 (Note: KAR: 3 pts; DER: 3pts)	
6	Anagennisi Deryneia	26	10	8	8	27	26	+1	38	
7	Elpida Xylofagou	26	9	7	10	29	34	−5	34	
8	Nikos & Sokratis Erimis	26	8	5	13	35	48	−13	29 (Note: N&S: 9 pts; ENAD: 4 pts; OLY: 4 pts)	
9	ENAD Polis Chrysochous	26	7	8	11	30	30	0	29	
10	Olympiakos Nicosia (Note: Olympiakos Nicosia started the league with three points deduction because they did not meet the financial criteria. On 3 November 2014, Olympiakos Nicosia were deducted three more points after FIFA decision, but on 28 January 2015, FIFA cancelled their initial decision and returned the three points to Olympiakos. On 24 December 2014, Olympiakos Nicosia were deducted three more points because they did not meet the financial criteria.)	26	10	5	11	34	42	−8	29	
11	Omonia Aradippou	26	8	4	14	35	37	−2	28	
12	Enosis Neon Parekklisia	26	7	4	15	26	39	−13	25	
13	Digenis Oroklinis	26	4	6	16	16	49	−33	18	
14	APEP (Note: APEP started the league with three points deduction because they did not meet the financial criteria. On 24 December 2014, APEP were deducted three more points because they did not meet the financial criteria.) (R)	26	4	2	20	18	52	−34	8	Relegated to Cypriot Third Division

Source: CFA, Soccerway
Rules for classification: 1) points; 2) head-to-head points; 3) head-to-head goal difference; 4) head-to-head away goals scored; 5) goal difference; 6) number of goals scored
(C) Champions; (P) Promoted; (R) Relegated

== Sources ==
- "2014/15 Cypriot Second Division". Rec.Sport.Soccer Statistics Foundation. 2016-01-14.
