= Georgios Dimizas =

Greek footballer (born 1994)

Personal information
- Full name: Georgios Dimizas
- Date of birth: 24 July 1994 (age 32)
- Place of birth: Sitia, Crete, Greece
- Height: 1.87 m (6 ft 2 in)
- Position: Goalkeeper

Youth career
- –2010: Olympiacos
- 2010–2012: Kallithea

Senior career*
Years	Team	Apps	(Gls)
2012–2014	MEAP Nisou		
2014–2015	Niki Volos	2	(0)
2015	Panachaiki	3	(0)
2015–2017	Triglia Rafinas		
2017–2020	Kavala		
2020–2021	Anagennisi Deryneia		
2021	Episkopi	14	(0)
2021–2022	Irodotos	17	(0)
2022–2023	P.A.O. Rouf	0	(0)
2023	Ellas Pontion	0	(0)
- * Club domestic league appearances and goals as of 20 March 2022

Georgios Dimizas (Greek: Γεώργιος Δήμιζας; born 24 July 1994) is a former Greek professional footballer who played as a goalkeeper.

== Honours ==
MEAP Nisou

- Cypriot Fourth Division: 2012–13

Kavala

- Gamma Ethniki: 2018–19
