= Ormideia FC =

Cypriot football club

- Founded: 2006
- Ground: Ormideia Municipality Stadium
- League: Third Division
- 2025–26: Third Division, 10th of 16

Ormideia FC is a Cypriot football club based in Ormideia. Founded in 2006, was playing sometimes in Third and in Fourth Division.

Ormideia FC at CFA's competitions.
Season	League										Cup	
Season	Division	Position	Teams	Played	Won	Drawn	Lost	Goals		Points	Competition	Round
Season	Division	Position	Teams	Played	Won	Drawn	Lost	For	Against	Points	Competition	Round
2009–10	D	6	15	28	11	10	7	42	39	43	Cypriot Cup for lower divisions	Quarterfinals
2010–11	D	1	14	26	17	7	2	52	24	28	Cypriot Cup for lower divisions	Quarterfinals
2011–12	C	11	14	26	8	6	12	27	33	30	Cypriot Cup for lower divisions	Not wanted to participate
2012–13	C	9	14	26	5	8	13	33	33	27	Cypriot Cup for lower divisions	Not wanted to participate
2013–14	C	6	14	26	9	9	8	32	31	32	Cypriot Cup for lower divisions	Semifinals
2014–15	C	13	14	26	6	10	10	32	38	28	Cypriot Cup for lower divisions	Not wanted to participate
2015–16	C	12	16	30	9	7	14	37	50	34	Cypriot Cup for lower divisions	Not wanted to participate
2016–17	C	12	16	30	10	5	15	31	35	35	Cypriot Cup for lower divisions	Not wanted to participate
Points: Won=3 points, Drawn=1 points, Lost=0 points

== Honours ==
- Cypriot Fourth Division
  - Champions (1): 2011
