= 2014–15 Cypriot Cup for lower divisions =

Tournament details
- Country: Cyprus
- Dates: 5 November 2014 – 8 April 2015
- Teams: 12

Final positions
- Champions: Akritas (1st title)
- Runners-up: PAEEK FC

The 2014–15 Cypriot Cup for lower divisions was the 7th edition of the Cypriot Cup for lower divisions. A total of 12 clubs entered the competition. It began on 5 November 2014 with the first round and concluded on 8 April 2015 with the final which was held at Geroskipou Municipality Stadium. Akritas Chlorakas won their 1st cup trophy after beating PAEEK FC 1–0 in the final.

== Format ==
Only teams from the Cypriot Third Division and Cypriot Fourth Division could participate. Participation was not compulsory. 12 of 28 participated that season.

The competition consisted of four rounds. In the first round each tie was played as a single leg and was held at the home ground of one of the two teams, according to the draw results. Each tie winner was qualifying to the next round. If a match was drawn, extra time was following. If extra time was drawn, there was a replay at the ground of the team who were away for the first game. If the rematch was also drawn, then extra time was following and if the match remained drawn after extra time the winner was decided by penalty shoot-out.

The next two rounds were played in a two-legged format, each team playing a home and an away match against their opponent. The team which scored more goals on aggregate, was qualifying to the next round. If the two teams scored the same number of goals on aggregate, then the team which scored more goals away from home was advancing to the next round.

If both teams had scored the same number of home and away goals, then extra time was following after the end of the second leg match. If during the extra thirty minutes both teams had managed to score, but they had scored the same number of goals, then the team who scored the away goals was advancing to the next round (i.e. the team which was playing away). If there weren't scored any goals during extra time, the qualifying team was determined by penalty shoot-out.

The final was a single match.

== First round ==
4 out of the 12 teams were drawn to qualify directly to the second round, without needing to play any match.

Team 1	Result	Team 2
(D) Adonis Idaliou	0 - 1	Achyronas Liopetriou (C)
(C) Digenis Akritas Morphou	1 - 2	Amathus Ayiou Tychona (C)
(C) Ethnikos Assia F.C.	1 - 0	ENTHOI Lakatamia FC (C)
(C) PAEEK FC	1 - 0	Chalkanoras Idaliou (C)
(D) Alki Oroklini	bye
(C) ENY-Digenis Ipsona	bye
(C) Akritas Chlorakas	bye
(D) Elpida Astromeriti	bye

== Quarter-finals ==
Team 1	Agg.	Team 2	1st leg	2nd leg
(D) Alki Oroklini	0 - 5	Achyronas Liopetriou (C)	0 - 4	0 - 1
(C) Amathus Ayiou Tychona	4 - 3	ENY-Digenis Ipsona (C)	2 - 0	2 - 3
(D) Elpida Astromeriti	3 - 5	Akritas Chlorakas (C)	2 - 2	1 - 3
(C) PAEEK FC	3 - 2	Ethnikos Assia F.C. (C)	2 - 2	1 - 0

== Semi-finals ==
Team 1	Agg.	Team 2	1st leg	2nd leg
(C) Akritas Chlorakas	4 - 0	Amathus Ayiou Tychona (C)	1 - 0	3 - 0
(C) Achyronas Liopetriou	3 - 3 (a.)	PAEEK FC (C)	2 - 2	1 - 1

== Final ==
8 April 2015

Akritas Chlorakas	1 – 0	PAEEK FC
Varnavidis 69'	(Report)

Geroskipou Municipality Stadium, Geroskipou
Attendance: 650
Referee: Chrysovalantis Theouli

Cypriot Cup for lower divisions 2014–15 Winners
Akritas Chlorakas
1st Title

== Sources ==
- "Cyprus 2014/15". Rec.Sport.Soccer Statistics Foundation. 2016-01-14.
- Official website (in Greek)

== See also ==
- Cypriot Cup for lower divisions
- 2014–15 Cypriot Third Division
- 2014–15 Cypriot Fourth Division
