= AEN Ayiou Georgiou Vrysoullon-Acheritou =

Cypriot football club

- Founded: 2004
- Ground: Olympos Acheritou Stadium
- League: STOK Elite Division
- 2021–22: STOK Elite Division, 8th

AEN Ayiou Georgiou Vrysoullon-Acheritou is a Cypriot football club based in Ayios Georgios Vrysoullon, Cyprus. The team has played once in the Third Division and four times in the Fourth Divion/STOK Elite Division. It participated once in the Cypriot Cup for lower divisions in 2012–13, losing in the semi-finals to ENTHOI Lakatamia FC who were also in the Fourth Division.

== History ==
The team was founded in 2004 by the merging of Olympos Acheritou and Dynamo Acheritou.

Olympos Acheritou was a Cypriot club founded in 1959 in Acheritou, located in the Famagusta District, currently under the de facto control of Northern Cyprus. After the Turkish invasion of Cyprus in 1974, Olympos moved to the Agios Georgios (refugee settlement). They played 7 times in Cypriot Fourth Division before the 2004 merger. It also participated in the 1987–88 and 1989–90 Cypriot Cups.

== Record ==
AEN Ayiou Georgiou Vrysoullon-Acheritou at CFA's competitions.
Season	League										Cup	
Season	Division	Position	Teams	Played	Won	Drawn	Lost	Goals		Points	Competition	Round
Season	Division	Position	Teams	Played	Won	Drawn	Lost	For	Against	Points	Competition	Round
2012–13	D	13	14	26	6	8	12	28	41	26	Cypriot Cup for lower divisions	Semifinals
2013–14	Participation at Famagusta-Larnaca Football Federation.											
2014–15	D	6	14	26	12	7	7	36	36	43	Cypriot Cup for lower divisions	Not wanted to participate
2015–16	Elite Division	3	14	26	16	4	6	54	28	52	Cypriot Cup for lower divisions	Not wanted to participate
2016–17	C	16	16	30	5	3	22	27	72	18	Cypriot Cup for lower divisions	Not wanted to participate
Points: Won=3 points, Drawn=1 points, Lost=0 points
