= Pervolia =

Pervolia Περβόλια
- Village
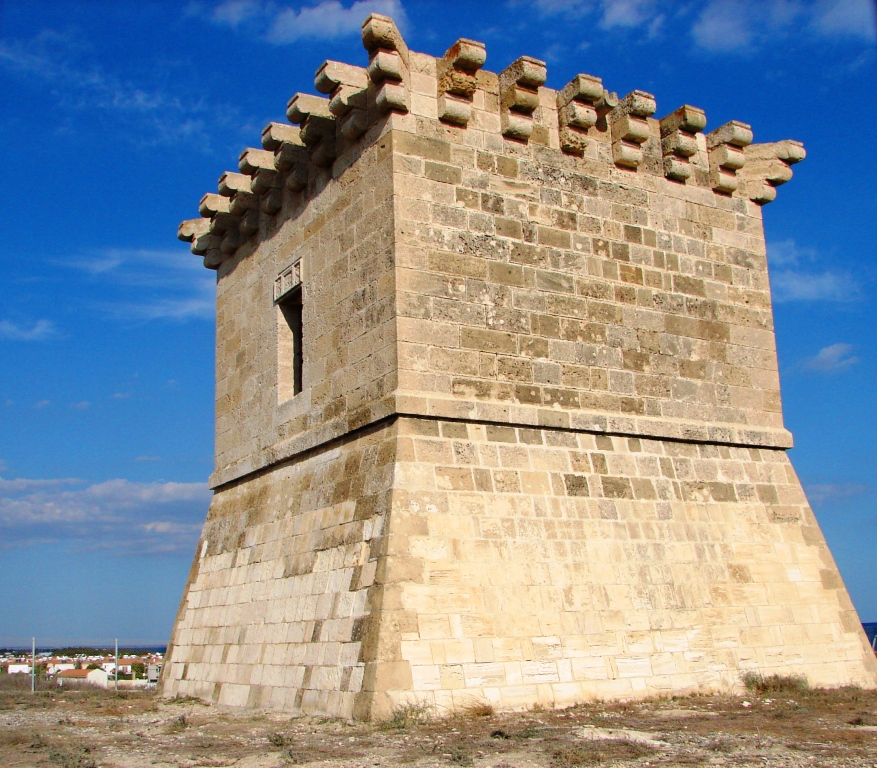
- The tower of Regaena

- Location in Cyprus
- Coordinates: 34°49′51″N 33°34′42″E
- Country: Cyprus
- District: Larnaca District

Population (2011)
  - Total: 3,009
- Time zone: UTC+2 (EET)
  - Summer (DST): UTC+3 (EEST)
- Website: http://www.pervolia.eu/en

Pervolia (Greek: Περβόλια; Turkish: Bahçalar), also spelled Perivolia (Greek: Περιβόλια), is a village located in the Larnaca District of Cyprus.

== History ==
In ancient years, Pervolia was a resting place for kings and wealthy people in the area. It was named after Greek word ‘pervoli’ for its abundant gardens, fertile soil, and thousands of productive trees. It used to belong to the royal family of the House of Lusignan during the Frankish Period of Cyprus, which lasted from 1191 until 1489. The last owner of this period was Charles Lusignan, who was persecuted by King James II of Cyprus because he supported Queen Charlotte. King James II of Cyprus took off Pervolia from Charles by issuing a decree. Pervolia was sold to the Podokatares family from Greece during the Venetian Period of Cyprus, and the last owner was Ektoras Podokatoras from 1489 to 1571.

== Monuments and points of interest ==
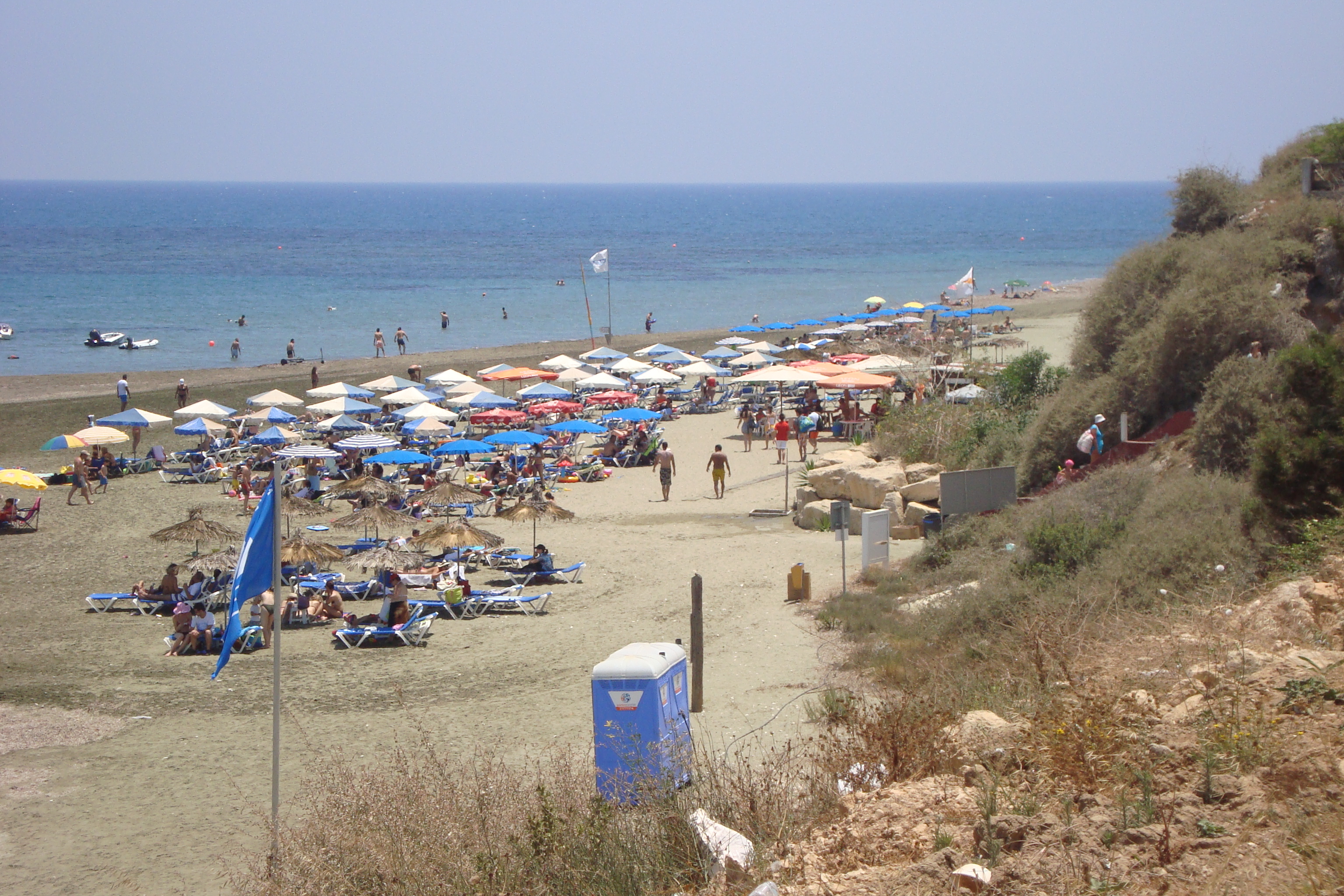
Faros beach

One of landmarks of Pervolia is the Light house of Pervolia. Tower of Regaena is Venetian watchtower, small stone tower built during Venetian occupation 1489–1570. It is used as observation point in order to send messages in case of attacks from sea. One of churches Agios Leontios the Miracle-maker is from 1500. Second church built 1903. is dedicated to the Great Martyr Agia Eirini. Faros beach is situated in Pervolia.

== Population ==
In 1881, Pervolia had 375 residents. This increased to 734 by 1960, followed by 1,144 by 1993, then 1,920 by 2001, and finally 3,009 by 2011. In the summer, the village changes appearance since it is flooded by thousands of local and foreign visitors, with over 5,000 people moving around the village on a daily basis.
