= Lenas Limassol =

Cypriot football club

- Founded: 1961; 64 years ago
- Ground: Trachoni Community Stadium
- 2016–17: 13th (relegated)

Lenas Limassol is a Cypriot association football club based in Agios Ioannis area of Limassol. It has 2 participations in Cypriot Fourth Division.
