= Enosis Neon Parekklisia FC =

Cypriot football club

ENP Pareklissias
- Full name: Enosis Neon Parekklisia; Ένωση Νέων Παρεκκλησιάς
- Founded: 2006; 19 years ago
- Ground: Parekklisia Community Stadium
- Capacity: 3.000
- Chairman: Polys Argyridis
- Manager: Kyriacos Fylaktou
- 2014–15: Second Division, 14th (relegated)
Home colours	Away colours

Enosis Neon Parekklisia Football Club (Greek: Ένωση Νέων Παρεκκλησιάς) is a football club based in Parekklisia, Limassol, Cyprus and competes in Cypriot Second Division.

== History ==
The club was founded in 2006 playing in black and yellow and is the theoretical continuation of AMEP Parekklisia and ATE-PEK Parekklisias. The team initially struggled in the fourth division but won promotion to the third division, winning the championship for the season 2009–10. In the 2014–2015 season, the club was playing in the second division but was relegated after one season.

== Titles ==
- Cypriot Fourth Division (1): 2010
