= Pyla =

Pyla: Πύλα (Greek); Pile (Turkish)
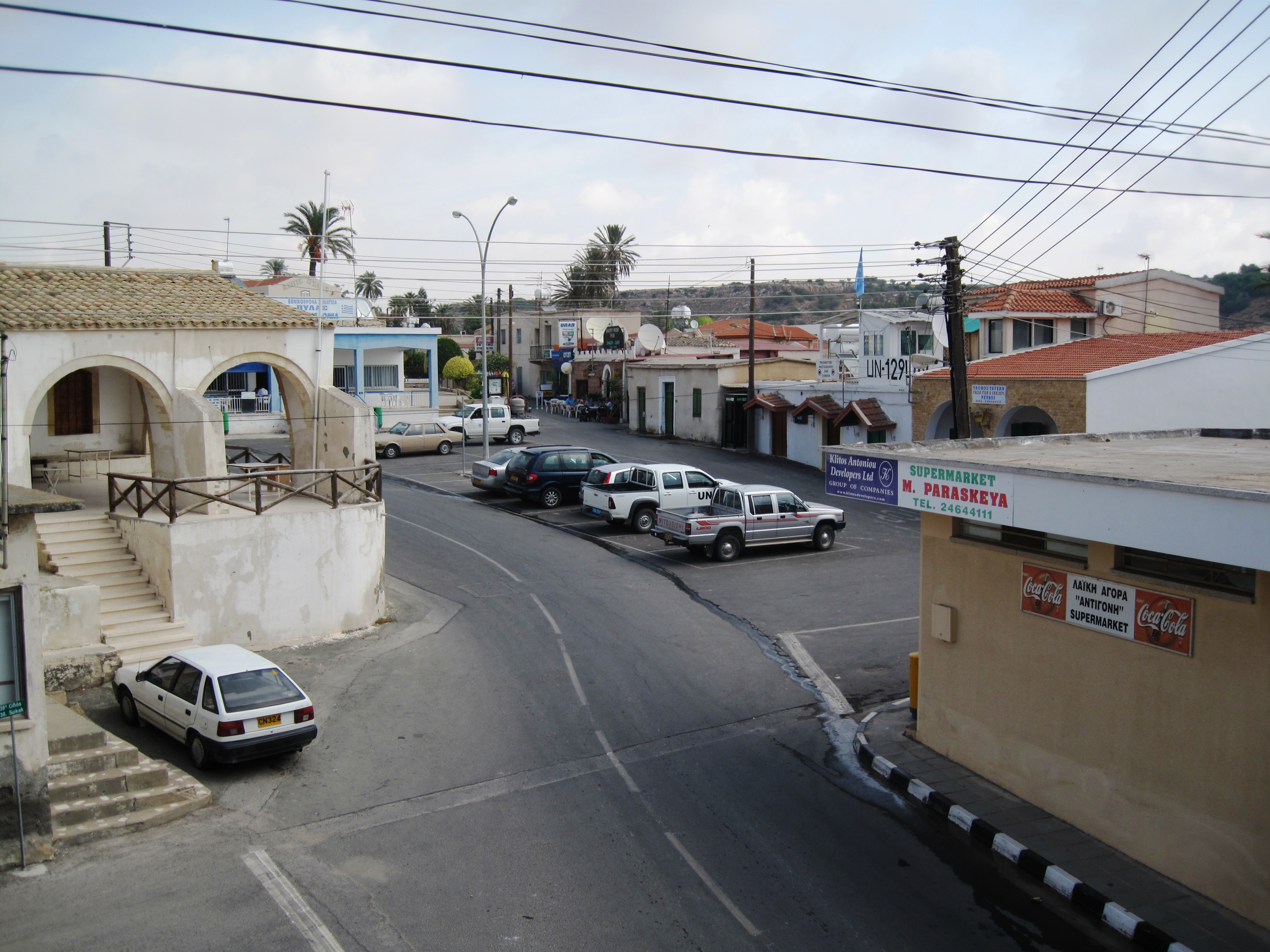
- A view from Pyla in 2009

- Location within Cyprus
- Coordinates: 35°00′50″N 33°41′33″E
- Country: Cyprus
- District: Larnaca

Population (2011)
  - Total: 2,771
- Time zone: UTC+2 (EET)
  - Summer (DST): UTC+3 (EEST)

Pyla (Greek: Πύλα (IPA: [ˈpila]); Turkish: Pile) is a village in Larnaca District, Cyprus. It is one of only four villages located within the United Nations Buffer Zone, the other three being Athienou, Troulloi and Deneia. Pyla is located in the eastern part of the island, adjacent to the British Sovereign Base Area of Dhekelia. From a legal point of view, it is administered as all other areas controlled by the government of the Republic of Cyprus, but policed by UN peacekeepers.

The village is notable in the respect that it is the only settlement in Cyprus still inhabited by both its original Greek Cypriot and Turkish Cypriot inhabitants. 850 of the inhabitants are Greek Cypriots and 487 are Turkish Cypriots. The village has three churches and one mosque.

Pyla-Kokkinokremos is an archaeological site dating to the Late Bronze Age.

== History ==
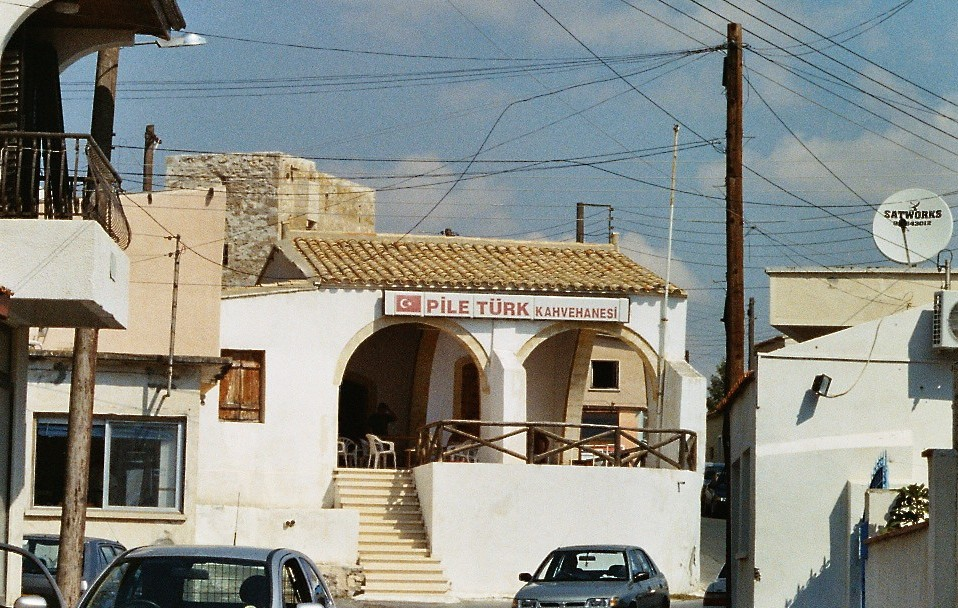
Turkish cafeteria in the centre of Pyla

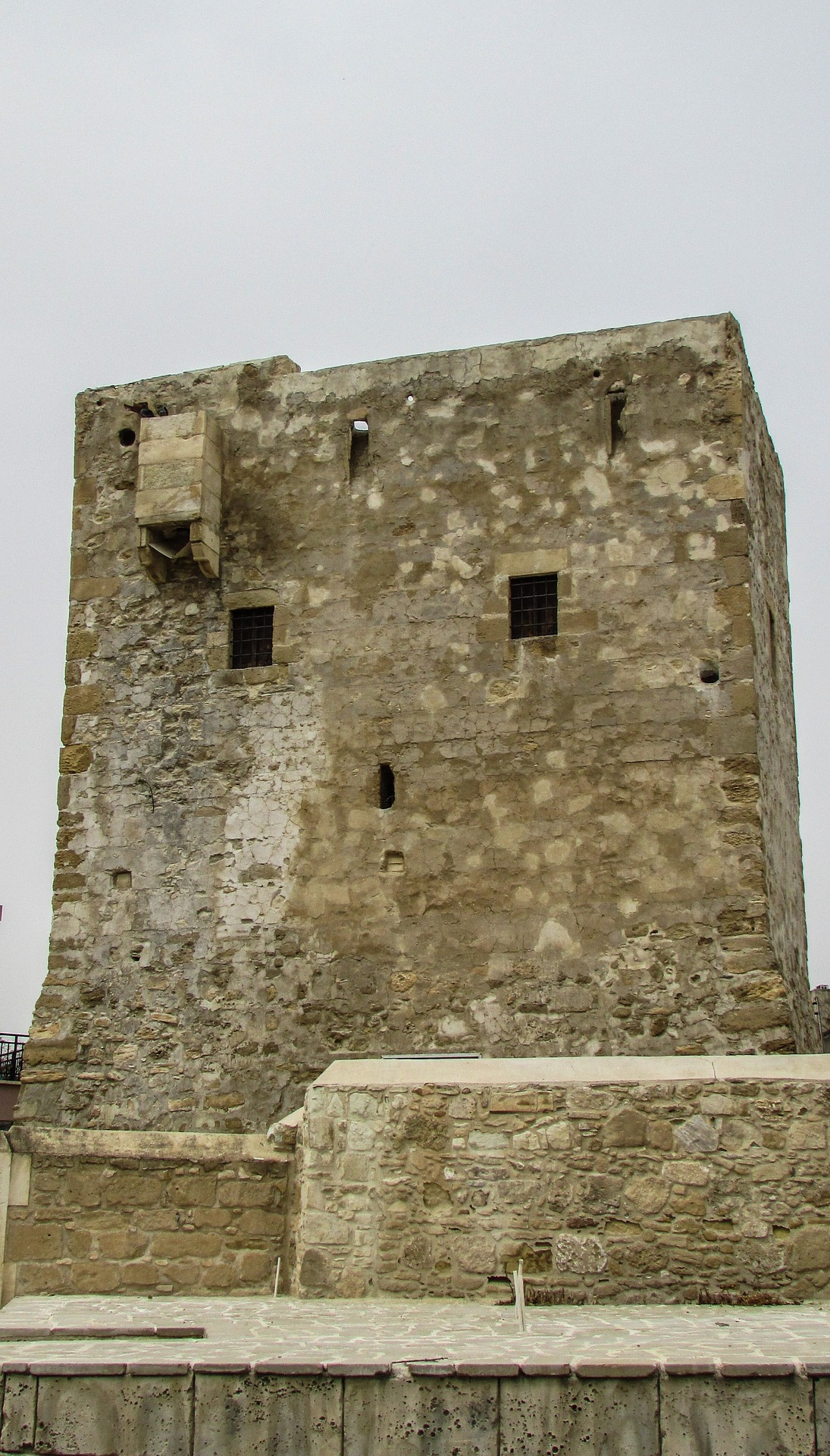
Medieval watchtower in Pyla

Pyla is among the oldest villages in Cyprus. The village was first inhabited during the Middle Ages. On several old maps it is marked with the names Pila or Pilla.

The name of the village is Greek which leads to the assumption that the village existed during the Byzantine years. The name "Pyla" is after the Greek word "πύλη" (entrance), probably because it was the only way to travel to the plain of Mesaoria. The University of Central Lancashire has a campus in the village, the only British university to have a site on the island.

== Pyla Tourist Area ==
Pyla Tourist Area is the area that neighbours the sea and belongs to the administrative division of the village of Pyla.

Several of the most luxurious hotels in Cyprus are located in the tourist area of Pyla, such as: Golden Bay, Lordos Beach and Sandy Beach. This strip is lined with a mix of taverns and restaurants, as well as tourist shops and boutiques, which all run parallel to the beachside which offers organised facilities, as well as kiosks and ice-cream stands. Pyla Tourist Area continues through the new Larnaca-Dhekelia sea road, onwards to the C.T.O. (Cyprus Tourist Organisation) beach.

== Sports ==
Currently, Aspis FC is the only football club in the village of Pyla. Also, the village hosts a volleyball club, named Finikas.

== 2023 crisis ==
On 18 August 2023, Turkish soldiers from the Cyprus Turkish Peace Force Command, Security Forces Command, de facto Turkish Cypriot Police and Turkish-Cypriot civilians alike came in conflict with UNFICYP soldiers and vehicles for blocking a road attempted to be built by the Turkish authorities in the island, which plans to connect the village of Arsos that lies within the occupied side to the village of Pyla in the buffer zone, bypassing the road in the northeast that passes through British military base checkpoints. UNFICYP, citing its duty to maintain the status quo, stated its intentions to halt and stop the road construction through peaceful means. Footage that reached media outlets and social media reflects UN jeeps blocking the construction site of the road with Turkish construction vehicle operators removing the vehicles forcefully. This assault on the UN forces drew international condemnation from Greece, France, the United States, the European Union and the United Kingdom. Criticism from UN and Cypriot authorities stated that the construction would have negative repercussions on the stagnant negotiations to resolve the island's division. Three peacekeepers were seriously injured and required hospitalisation. The Turkish president accused the UN force of bias against Turkish Cypriots and added that Turkey will not allow any "unlawful" behaviour toward Turks on Cyprus. The U.N. Security Council said that the incident was a violation of the status quo that is contrary to council resolutions and condemned the assault on the peacekeepers. The U.N. Secretary-General António Guterres said that “threats to the safety of U.N. peacekeepers and damage to U.N. property are unacceptable and may constitute serious crimes under international law".

On 9 October 2023, both the Turkish side and UNFICYP announced that they have reached an agreement and, further, Turkish Cypriot Foreign Minister Tahsin Ertuğruloğlu stated that the construction of the road will continue.

== Famous people from Pyla ==
- Anna Vissi
