= Elpida Xylofagou =

Cypriot football club

- Nickname: Elpis
- Founded: 1959; 67 years ago
- Ground: Michalonikion Stadio, Xylofagou
- Capacity: 2000
- Chairman: Antonis Theophanous
- Manager: Giannakis Pontikos
- 2019–20: Third Division, 7th
Home colours	Away colours

Elpida Xylofagou is a Cypriot football club based in the village of Xylofagou in Larnaca district. The club, which was established in 1959, currently competes in the Cypriot Second Division, after a successful campaign in the Cypriot Third Division, from which it gains the promotion. Their colors are white and blue.

In recent years, the team has also regularly participated in the Cypriot Cup.

== Stadium ==
The team uses the Michalonikion Stadion, as a home stadium. The stadium has a capacity of 2,000 fans.

== Achievements ==
- Cypriot Third Division Winners: 2

1987, 2014

- Cypriot Cup for lower divisions Winners: 1

2009
