= Enosis Neon THOI Lakatamia =

Cypriot football club

- Full name: Enosis Neon THOI Lakatamia; Ένωσις Νέων Θρησκευτικό Ορθόδοξο Ίδρυμα Λακατάμιας
- Founded: 1926
- Ground: THOI Lakatamia Stadium; Lakatamia
- Capacity: 3,500
- League: Third Division
- 2025–26: Third Division, 12th of 16
Home colours	Away colours

Enosis Neon THOI Lakatamia (Greek: Ένωση Νέων ΘΟΪ Λακατάμια; Youth Union THOI Lakatamia) is a Cypriot football club based in Lakatamia, Nicosia. Their colours are blue and yellow and their stadium is the Municipal Stadium of Lakatamia. In 2005–2006, it was playing in the Cypriot First Division.

== Achievements ==
- Cypriot Third Division Winners: 3

1983, 2000, 2015

- Cypriot Fourth Division Winners: 1

1999

- Cypriot Cup for lower divisions Winners: 1

2013
