= Spartakos Kitiou =

- Full name: Spartakos Kitiou
- Founded: 1958; 68 years ago
- Ground: Kiti Municipality Stadium
- Chairman: Michalis Koungas
- Manager: Nuno Manta Santos
- League: Second Division
- 2025–26: Second Division, 10th of 16

Spartakos Kitiou FC is a Cypriot football club based in Kiti, Cyprus. Founded in 1958, the club was promoted to the 2024–25 Cypriot Second Division after years of playing in lower leagues.

In 2024 they also qualified for the small club cup final.

== Honours ==
- Cypriot Fourth Division:
  - Champions (1): 2006
