= Finikas Ayias Marinas Chrysochous =

Cypriot football club

Finikas Ayias
- Full name: Finikas Ayias Marinas Chrysochous
- Founded: 1973
- Ground: Dimotiko Stadio; Ayia Marina Chrysochous, Paphos District, Cyprus
- Capacity: 1,000
- Manager: (Cyprus) Kostas Tantchou
- League: STOK Elite Division
- Website: https://www.cfa.com.cy/En/roster/12601716/55255
| Home colours | Away colours |

Finikas Ayias Marinas Chrysochous is a Cypriot professional football club based in Ayia Marina Chrysochous, Paphos District, Cyprus. It was founded in 1973, and is currently playing in the STOK Elite Division, Cypriot fourth division.
