= Livadia, Larnaca =

Livadia Λιβάδια (Greek)
- Municipal District
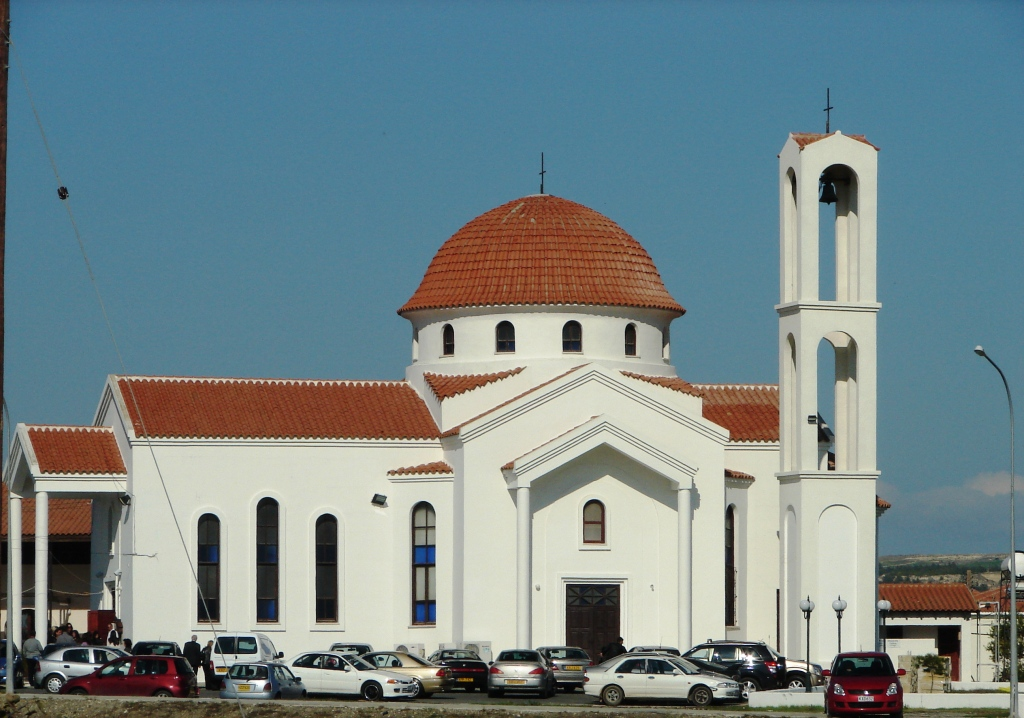

- Location in Cyprus
- Coordinates: 34°56′58″N 33°37′52″E
- Country: Cyprus
- District: Larnaca District
- Municipality: Larnaca Municipality

Government
  - Deputy Mayor: Marios Armenis

Population (2011)
  - Total: 7,206
- Time zone: UTC+2 (EET)
  - Summer (DST): UTC+3 (EEST)

Livadia (Greek: Λιβάδια [locally [liˈvaθca]]) is a municipal district of the Larnaca Municipality and suburb of Larnaca. It has been a settlement since the Middle Bronze Age.
