= Astromeritis =

Astromeritis: Αστρομερίτης (Greek); Astromerit (Turkish)
- Astromeritis in 2023

- Location in Cyprus
- Coordinates: 35°8′0″N 33°2′0″E
- Country: Cyprus
- District: Nicosia District

Government
  - Type: Community council
  - President: MOKA
- Elevation: 160 m (520 ft)

Population (2011)
  - Total: 2,307
- Time zone: UTC+2 (EET)
  - Summer (DST): UTC+3 (EEST)
- Postal code: 2722
- Website: http://www.astromeritis.org/

Astromeritis (Greek: Αστρομερίτης; Turkish: Astromerit) is a large village in the Morphou Department of the Nicosia District of Cyprus. It is located 30 km (18.64 mi) from the capital Nicosia. At the 2011 census it had a population of 2,307.

== Green Line crossing ==
Astromeritis is the location of one of the six de facto crossings across the UN Buffer Zone between the area effectively controlled by the Republic of Cyprus and the Northern Cyprus. The town on the northern side of the border is Zodeia (Turkish: Bostancı). The crossing is only for vehicular traffic.

The crossing was opened on 31 August 2005.
