= Agios Tychonas =

Agios Tychonas Άγιος Τύχωνας
- Village and Municipal District
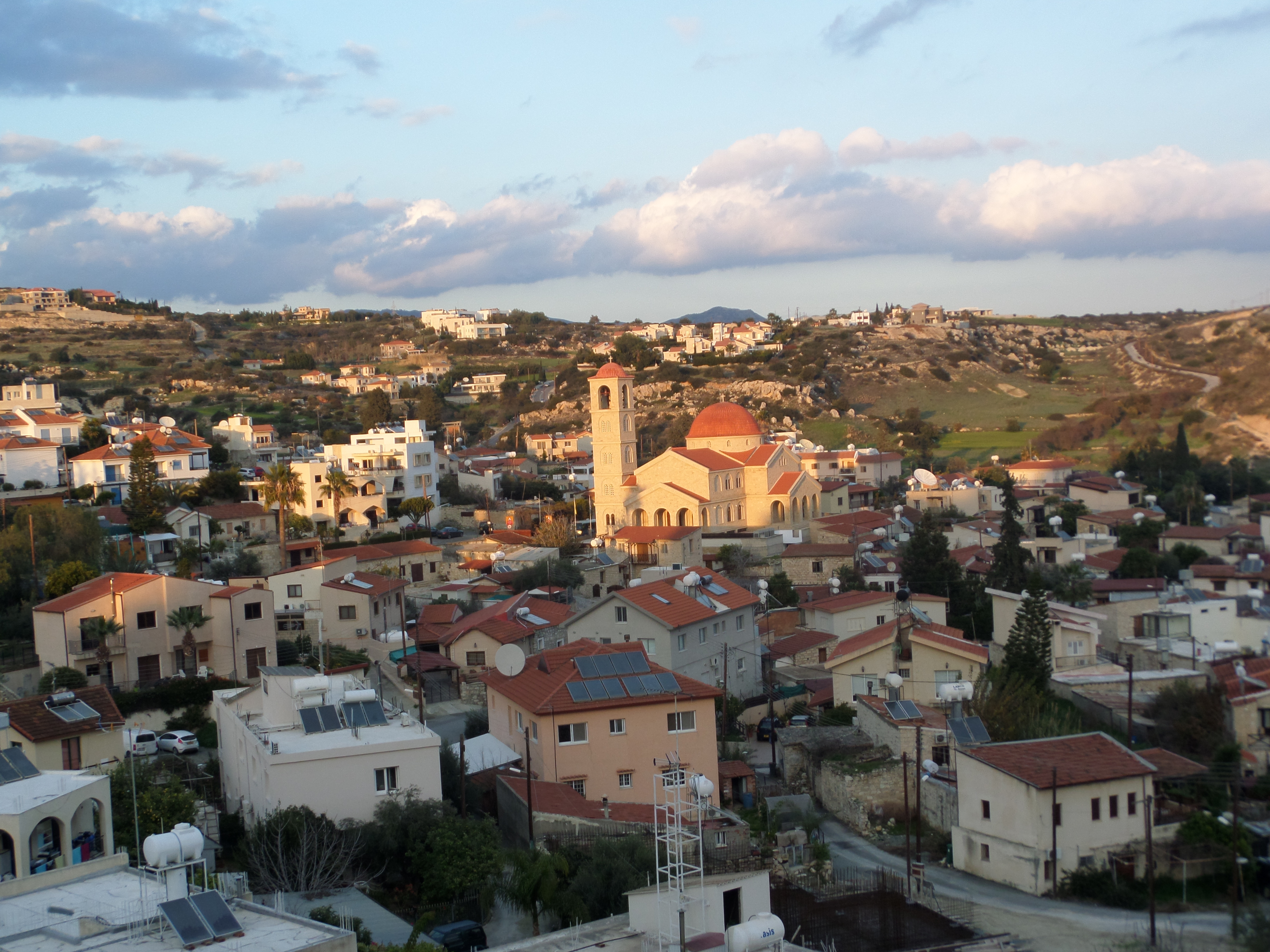
- Traditional center of Agios Tychonas

- Location in Cyprus
- Coordinates: 34°43′34″N 33°8′26″E
- Country: Cyprus
- District: Limassol District
- Municipality: Amathounta Municipality

Government
  - Deputy Mayor: Iraklis Irakleous
- Elevation: 246 ft (75 m)

Population (2021)
  - Total: 4,502
- Time zone: UTC+2 (EET)
  - Summer (DST): UTC+3 (EEST)
- Website: agiostychonas.org.cy

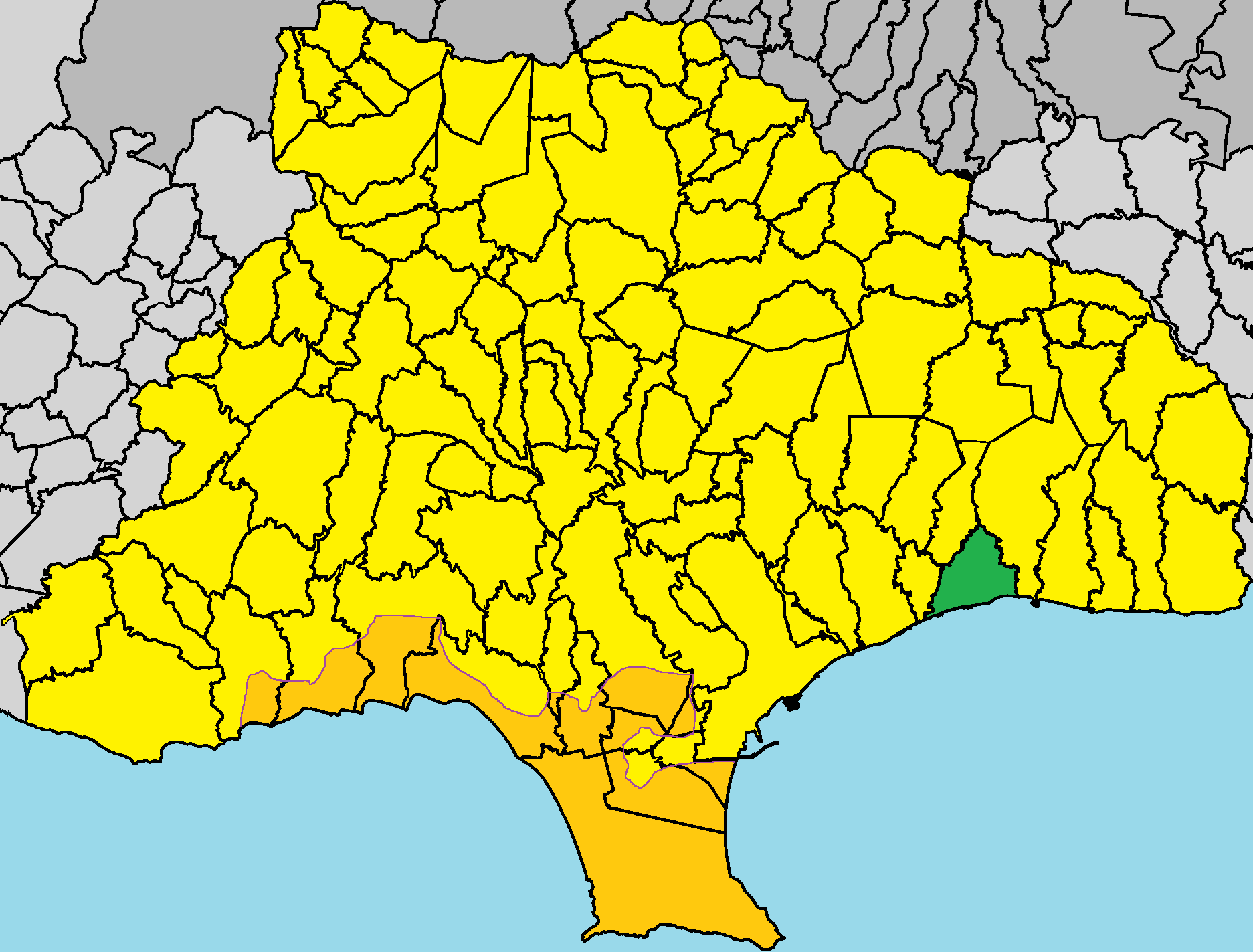
Agios Tychonas in Limassol District.

Agios Tychonas (Greek: Άγιος Τύχωνας) is a village and a municipal district of the Amathounta Municipality in the Limassol District of Cyprus, located east of Limassol. The ancient ruins of Amathus are near the town.

Agios Tychonas is named for Saint Tychon of Amathus, a 5th-century bishop of Amathus.

== History ==
The village preserves material remains from multiple periods of Cypriot history, including the Ancient Greek, Byzantine, and Medieval eras. Dominating the area is the ancient city-kingdom of Amathus, situated along the coastal front of Agios Tychonas. According to tradition, the city derived its name from Amathousa, the mother of Kinyras, the legendary king of Paphos.

One theory holds that the original settlement of Agios Tychonas was constructed using limestone blocks transported from Amathus following its final destruction in 1191. The village formerly maintained a church dedicated to Saint Tychon, the second bishop of Amathus; the structure, located near the coastline, is now abandoned.

== Tourism ==
Agios Tychonas has undergone significant tourist development. Within the community are numerous luxury hotels and tourist apartments. Seven of its beaches have been awarded the European Union's Blue Flag for meeting environmental criteria relating to cleanliness and the quality of services provided. The beaches are equipped with breakwaters to ensure swimmer safety, as well as lifeguard coverage.

A variety of water sports are available along the Agios Tychonas coastline, including water-skiing, sailing, parasailing, canoeing, speedboating, jet-skiing, and other motorized water activities. The community also hosts Cyprus's only dedicated sailing center. Additionally, at the harbor of Ancient Amathus, a diving school offers dives both for training and for exploring the marine life. The waters of Agios Tychonas are home to more than two hundred species of fish, and divers can also see the ancient columns of the Amathus harbor lying on the seabed a short distance from the shore.

Agios Tychonas is also home to a 6 kilometres (3.7 mi) coastal walkway extending from the Poseidonia Hotel in the west to the chapel of Saint Barbara in the east. At the walkway's endpoint there is a park and a children's play area.

== Βιβλιογραφία ==
- Καρούζης, Γιώργος (2001). Περιδιαβάζοντας την Κύπρο: Λεμεσός (πόλη και επαρχία) (πρώτη ed.). Λευκωσία: ΣΕΛΑΣ Κέντρο Μελετών, Ερευνών & Εκδόσεων. pp. 107–109. ISBN 9963-566-67-7.
