= Karim Mekkaoui =

Lebanese footballer (born 2003)

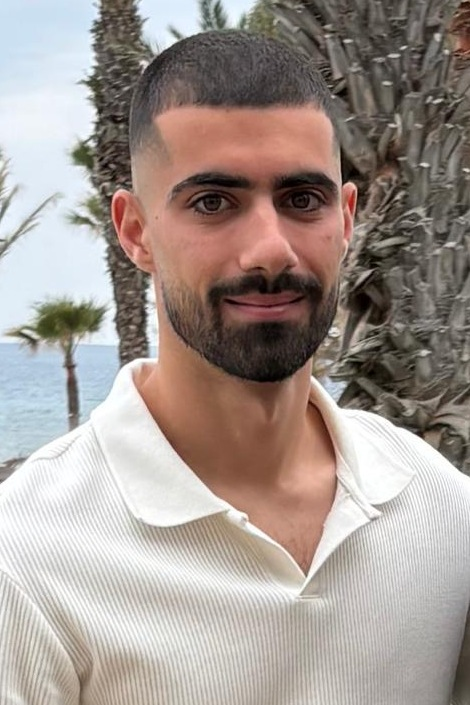
- Mekkaoui in 2026

Personal information
- Full name: Karim Muhieddine Mekkaoui
- Date of birth: 19 April 2001 (age 25)
- Place of birth: Beirut, Lebanon
- Height: 1.73 m (5 ft 8 in)
- Position: Winger

Team information
- Current team: Ethnikos Achna

Youth career
- 2017–2018: Safa

Senior career*
Years	Team	Apps	(Gls)
2018–2021	Racing Beirut		
2021–2022	Othellos Athienou	16	(2)
2022–2023	Ayia Napa	25	(3)
2023–2026	Omonia Aradippou	55	(6)
2026	Doxa Katokopias	4	(0)
2026–	Ethnikos Achna	0	(0)

International career^{‡}
2019	Lebanon U19	3	(1)
2021–2023	Lebanon U23	10	(1)
2025	Lebanon	3	(0)
- * Club domestic league appearances and goals as of 3 May 2026 ‡ National team caps and goals as of 8 September 2025

Karim Muhieddine Mekkaoui (Arabic: كريم محيي الدين مكاوي; born 19 April 2001) is a Lebanese professional footballer who plays as a winger for Cypriot club Ethnikos Achna.

== Club career ==
=== Racing Beirut ===
Mekkaoui played for Lebanese side Safa's youth team in 2017, but left due to limited senior playing time. He joined Racing Beirut mid-2017–18 season in 2018, and made his Lebanese Premier League debut under coach Roda Antar aged 16. He "quickly caught the eye with his skills, high technique, and scoring sense" while playing for the club. Mekkaoui was awarded the 2018–19 Lebanese Premier League Best Young Player while playing for them. Following this season, Mekkaoui had a trial with Dutch club AZ Alkmaar, but did not sign due to passport-related issues.

=== Cyprus ===
In 2021, Mekkaoui signed for Cypriot Second Division side Othellos Athienou on a two-year contract, and scored twice in 16 games in the 2021–22 season. In 2022, Mekkaoui signed for Second Division side Ayia Napa, making 25 league appearances and scoring three goals in 2022–23. In 2023, he moved to side Omonia Aradippou, helping the club achieve promotion to the Cypriot First Division in his first season. Mekkaoui played 55 games between 2023 and 2026, scoring six goals in the process.

On 28 January 2026, Mekkaoui joined Doxa Katokopias mid-2025–26 Second Division. During a match against Omonia 29M on 21 February, he suffered a pelvic fracture and was sidelined for the rest of the season. On 6 July 2026, Mekkaoui moved to newly relegated Second Division side Ethnikos Achna, ahead of the 2026–27 season.

== International career ==
Mekkaoui played for Lebanon internationally at the under-14 level and progressed through the youth teams. He played for the under-23 team at the 2024 AFC U-23 Asian Cup qualification.

Mekkaoui was first called up to the Lebanon national team ahead of the friendly match against Oman on 28 May 2025, and made his debut as a second-half substitute.

== Personal life ==
Mekkaoui cited France international Paul Pogba and Lebanon international Mohamad Haidar as his football idols. He is a supporter of the Portugal national team and Spanish side Real Madrid.

== Career statistics ==
=== Club ===
As of match played 21 February 2026

Appearances and goals by club, season and competition
Club	Season	League			Cypriot Cup		Total	
Club	Season	Division	Apps	Goals	Apps	Goals	Apps	Goals
Othellos Athienou	2021–22	Cypriot Second Division	16	2	—		16	2
Ayia Napa	2022–23	Cypriot Second Division	25	3	—		25	3
Omonia Aradippou	2023–24	Cypriot Second Division	25	5	1	0	26	5
Omonia Aradippou	2024–25	Cypriot First Division	20	1	2	1	22	2
Omonia Aradippou	2025–26	Cypriot First Division	10	0	2	0	12	0
Omonia Aradippou	Total		55	6	5	1	60	7
Doxa Katokopias	2025–26	Cypriot Second Division	4	0	0	0	4	0
Ethnikos Achna	2026–27	Cypriot Second Division	0	0	0	0	0	0
Career total			100	11	5	1	105	12

=== International ===
As of match played 8 September 2025

Appearances and goals by national team and year
National team	Year	Apps	Goals
Lebanon	2025	3	0
Total		3	0

== Honours ==
Individual

- Lebanese Young Player of the Year: 2018–19

Omonia Aradippou

- Cypriot Second Division: 2023–24
