= Jason Puncheon =

English football player and manager

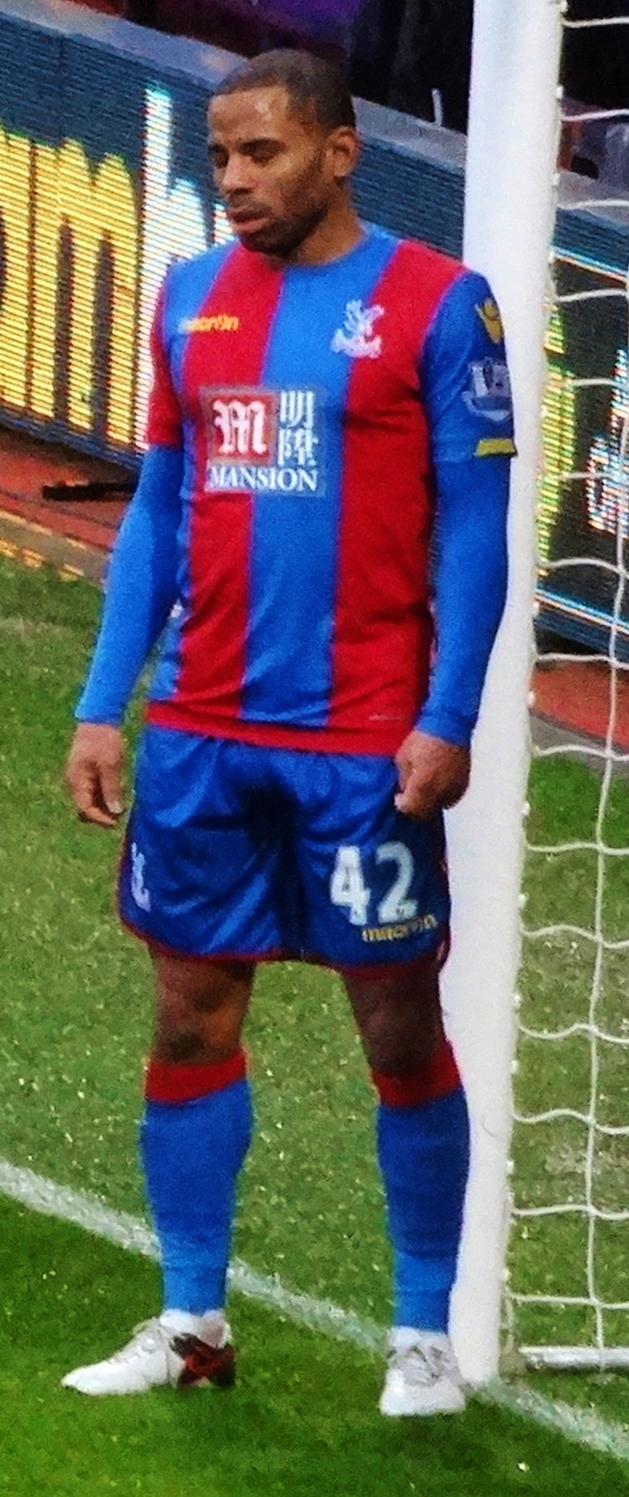
- Puncheon in 2016

Personal information
- Full name: Jason David Ian Puncheon
- Date of birth: 18 June 1986 (age 40)
- Place of birth: Croydon, England
- Height: 5 ft 8 in (1.73 m)
- Position: Midfielder

Senior career*
| Years | Team | Apps | (Gls) |
| 2003–2004 | Wimbledon | 8 | (0) |
| 2004–2006 | Milton Keynes Dons | 26 | (1) |
| 2006 | Fisher Athletic | 1 | (0) |
| 2006 | Lewes | 1 | (0) |
| 2006–2008 | Barnet | 78 | (15) |
| 2008–2010 | Plymouth Argyle | 6 | (0) |
| 2008 | → Milton Keynes Dons (loan) | 9 | (1) |
| 2009 | → Milton Keynes Dons (loan) | 18 | (3) |
| 2009–2010 | → Milton Keynes Dons (loan) | 24 | (7) |
| 2010–2014 | Southampton | 74 | (9) |
| 2010–2011 | → Millwall (loan) | 7 | (5) |
| 2011 | → Blackpool (loan) | 11 | (3) |
| 2011 | → Queens Park Rangers (loan) | 2 | (0) |
| 2013–2014 | → Crystal Palace (loan) | 20 | (3) |
| 2014–2019 | Crystal Palace | 133 | (12) |
| 2019 | → Huddersfield Town (loan) | 6 | (0) |
| 2019–2022 | Pafos | 65 | (5) |
| 2022–2023 | Anorthosis Famagusta | 16 | (0) |
| 2024 | Kissos Kissonergas | | |
| Total | | 508 | (64) |

Managerial career
- 2023–2024: Peyia 2014
- 2024: AEZ Zakakiou
- 2024: Ayia Napa
- 2024–2025: Akritas Chlorakas
- * Club domestic league appearances and goals

Jason David Ian Puncheon (born 18 June 1986) is an English professional football manager and former player who played as a midfielder.

Puncheon started his career at Wimbledon, moving with the team as they became Milton Keynes Dons. After being released, he had a brief spell in non-league with Fisher Athletic and Lewes before climbing back up the English football pyramid, eventually playing in the top-flight with Blackpool. He went on to make more than 200 Premier League appearances.

Following his goal against Everton on his Blackpool debut, Puncheon has scored in all of the top four divisions of English league football, scoring for Barnet in League Two, Milton Keynes Dons and Southampton in League One, Millwall in the Championship and Blackpool, Southampton and Crystal Palace in the Premier League. He has also scored in an FA Cup final, opening the scoring in the 2016 final for Crystal Palace as they eventually lost to Manchester United.

Puncheon spent the final years of his playing career in the Cypriot First Division, with Pafos and later Anorthosis Famagusta. After retirement, he started his managerial journey with Cypriot Second Division side Peyia 2014. Following an unsuccessful spell managing in the First Division with AEZ Zakakiou and a stint in charge of Ayia Napa, Puncheon led Akritas Chlorakas to top-flight promotion for only the second time in their history, finishing third in the 2024–25 Second Division.

== Club career ==
=== Early career ===
Born in Croydon, Greater London, Puncheon began his career with Wimbledon, and moved with the team to Milton Keynes, where the club became Milton Keynes Dons in 2004. He was released in January 2006. He moved to Barnet in June of the same year, after brief spells in non-league with Fisher Athletic and Lewes. He was named 2006–07 FA Cup Player of the Third Round and in the following season after scoring a succession of brilliant goals (including a last minute 35-yard free kick versus Bradford City) was named in the PFA League Two Team of the Year.

=== Plymouth Argyle ===
Plymouth Argyle signed Puncheon from Barnet for £250,000 in 2008. He endured an unsuccessful 18-month spell at the club, making only six league appearances. He was loaned to former club MK Dons three times in two years, where he scored 12 goals in 61 appearances.

=== Southampton ===
On 30 January 2010, Puncheon joined Southampton which then led to his loan deal at MK Dons to be cut short. He scored his first goal in a 5–1 victory over Walsall, and scored again a few days later, in a 5–0 victory over Huddersfield Town. He was unable to contribute to Southampton winning the 2009–10 Football League Trophy as he was cup-tied.

At the start of the 2010–11 season, he was a regular in the first team. However, when Alan Pardew lost his job just days after a 4–0 win away to Bristol Rovers, Southampton hired Nigel Adkins as manager. Under Adkins, he stayed in the first team, but found himself under increasing pressure from Alex Oxlade-Chamberlain for his place. Eventually Adkins lost patience with Puncheon's erratic performances, and dropped him to the bench in favour of 17-year-old Oxlade-Chamberlain, who was later sold to Arsenal for a reported £15m. On 16 November 2010, Puncheon moved on an emergency loan deal to Millwall. He scored his first goal in his first game for Millwall in their 1–0 victory over Middlesbrough. On 1 January 2011, Puncheon scored a hat-trick in the 3–0 victory over Crystal Palace.

On 31 January 2011, Puncheon joined Blackpool on loan until the end of the season. He made his debut in the Premier League, scoring a goal, at Everton on 5 February. He scored his second goal against Chelsea on 7 March at Bloomfield Road. Puncheon re-joined the Saints after Blackpool's failed attempt to fight off relegation. On 31 August 2011, Puncheon joined Queens Park Rangers on loan until 2 January 2012.

He returned to the Saints after his unsuccessful loan spell at QPR, but on 21 January 2012, he publicly criticised executive chairman Nicola Cortese. However just days later, it was revealed that Puncheon had apologised to Cortese and would be available for selection in the first team. He then started the next two matches: a 1–1 draw in the FA Cup at Millwall and a 1–1 draw in the Championship against Cardiff City.

He scored his first goal of the 2012–13 season with a 30-yard volley in a League Cup win at Stevenage. He scored his first Premier League goal for Southampton in a 4–1 home victory against Aston Villa. His second came when Southampton won 3–1 away to QPR. He scored his third Premier League goal in the 61st minute against Reading to secure Southampton a vital 1–0 victory and move them out of the relegation zone. His fourth was scored to give Southampton a 2–2 draw away to the then-champions of Europe, Chelsea. On 9 February 2013, he scored his fifth in Southampton's 3–1 home win against 2011–12 champions Manchester City. He also made headlines in January 2013 when during a match against Everton, he appeared to have left the field for a brief moment, and on his return fans began chants implying he had a toilet break.

On 1 March 2013, Puncheon signed a new contract with Southampton, expiring in 2016.

=== Crystal Palace ===
On 21 August 2013, Puncheon signed a one-year loan with Crystal Palace. He missed a penalty as Palace lost 2–0 away to Tottenham Hotspur on 11 January 2014, but made up for his miss by scoring the only goal of their 1–0 win against Stoke City the following weekend. On 31 January 2014, Puncheon made his loan spell into a permanent move, for a fee of around £1.75m. Puncheon's three goals in January and a further three in back-to-back wins in April that lifted Palace away from the relegation zone, led boss Tony Pulis to issue a 'hands off' warning to other clubs interested in signing Puncheon.

On 16 August 2014, in Palace's first match of the new season away to Arsenal, Puncheon took a corner which was headed in by Brede Hangeland for the first goal of the game. He was sent off for his second booking in the 89th minute, after which Arsenal scored their winning goal. On 17 January 2015, Puncheon scored his third goal of the season and second in as many games against Burnley in a 3–2 away win. Crystal Palace had come from 2 goals down to claim victory to boost their survival hopes. Palace manager Alan Pardew praised Puncheon's performance, describing him as "the best player on the pitch by a country mile".

On 6 April 2015, Puncheon scored the winning goal for Crystal Palace against Manchester City. Puncheon's goal came from a freekick which went past Manchester City's goalkeeper Joe Hart. He opened the scoring in the 2016 FA Cup final against Manchester United with a goal in the 78th minute, but Palace went on to lose the match 2–1 after extra time.

On 18 July 2017, Puncheon replaced Scott Dann as captain. In January 2018, manager Roy Hodgson announced that Puncheon would play no further part in the 2017–18 season following a cruciate ligament injury sustained while playing against Manchester City.

In May 2019, Crystal Palace issued a statement that Puncheon would leave the club at the end of the 2018–19 season after having made 169 appearances and scored 16 goals.

==== Loan to Huddersfield Town ====
On 4 January 2019, Puncheon signed for Premier League club Huddersfield Town on loan until the end of the season.

=== Cyprus ===
In August 2019, Puncheon completed a move to Cypriot football with First Division side Pafos. After three seasons with the club, he moved to Anorthosis Famagusta, where he spent one season before retiring in 2023.

After a year in management, Puncheon briefly came out of retirement to play for fifth tier side Kissos Kissonergas.

== Managerial career ==
=== Peyia 2014 ===
Puncheon was appointed head coach of Cypriot Second Division club Peyia 2014 ahead of the 2023–24 season. He left the role at the end of January in his first season.

=== AEZ Zakakiou ===
On 10 February 2024, Puncheon was appointed head coach of Cypriot First Division club AEZ Zakakiou. He was sacked less than one month later after failing to win any of his first seven games.

=== Ayia Napa ===
On 29 October 2024, Puncheon was appointed manager of Second Division side Ayia Napa on a contract until the end of the season. On 19 November, it was announced that Puncheon's contract had been mutually terminated, having won both his games in charge with no goals conceded.

=== Akritas Chlorakas ===
On 20 November 2024, a day after leaving Ayia Napa, Puncheon was appointed head coach of Akritas Chlorakas. Akritas finished third in the 2024–25 season, earning promotion to the First Division, with Puncheon winning the PASP Second Division Manager of the Season award. However, in June 2025, he was forced to resign as he did not have a UEFA Pro Licence, which is mandatory for all Cypriot First Division head coaches. He was unable to obtain special dispensation from the Cyprus Football Association, despite his previous experience managing in the top-flight with AEZ.

== Personal life ==
Puncheon is of Jamaican descent and was eligible for the Jamaica national team.

In December 2017, Puncheon was arrested and charged with possession of an offensive weapon, common assault, and a public order offence of "causing fear or provocation of violence" after a fight outside a nightclub in Reigate. On 5 January 2018, Puncheon appeared in court where he denied the charge of assault. The charge of possessing an offensive weapon was withdrawn and he was bailed to appear again in court on 4 June. He later changed his plea to guilty and was given a community order requiring him to carry out 210 hours of unpaid work, and pay the doorman involved £250 compensation.

== Career statistics ==
Appearances and goals by club, season and competition
| Club | Season | League | | | National cup (Note: Includes FA Cup, Cypriot Cup) | | League cup (Note: Includes Football League Cup/EFL Cup) | | Other (Note: Includes appearances in Football League Trophy and the Football League play-offs) | | Total | |
| Club | Season | Division | Apps | Goals | Apps | Goals | Apps | Goals | Apps | Goals | Apps | Goals |
|---|---|---|---|---|---|---|---|---|---|---|---|---|
| Wimbledon | 2003–04 | First Division | 8 | 0 | 0 | 0 | 0 | 0 | 0 | 0 | 8 | 0 |
| Milton Keynes Dons | 2004–05 | League One | 25 | 1 | 2 | 0 | 2 | 0 | 2 | 0 | 31 | 1 |
| Milton Keynes Dons | 2005–06 | League One | 1 | 0 | 0 | 0 | 1 | 0 | 1 | 0 | 3 | 0 |
| Milton Keynes Dons | Total | | 26 | 1 | 2 | 0 | 3 | 0 | 3 | 0 | 34 | 1 |
| Fisher Athletic | 2005–06 | Isthmian League Premier | 1 | 0 | — | | — | | 0 | 0 | 1 | 0 |
| Lewes | 2005–06 | Conference South | 1 | 0 | — | | — | | 0 | 0 | 1 | 0 |
| Barnet | 2006–07 | League Two | 37 | 5 | 4 | 1 | 2 | 0 | 2 | 0 | 45 | 6 |
| Barnet | 2007–08 | League Two | 41 | 10 | 5 | 0 | 1 | 1 | 1 | 0 | 48 | 11 |
| Barnet | Total | | 78 | 15 | 9 | 1 | 3 | 1 | 3 | 0 | 93 | 17 |
| Plymouth Argyle | 2008–09 | Championship | 6 | 0 | 0 | 0 | 1 | 0 | 0 | 0 | 7 | 0 |
| Milton Keynes Dons (loan) | 2008–09 | League One | 27 | 4 | 0 | 0 | — | | 2 | 0 | 29 | 4 |
| Milton Keynes Dons (loan) | 2009–10 | League One | 24 | 7 | 3 | 0 | 1 | 0 | 4 | 1 | 32 | 8 |
| Milton Keynes Dons (loan) | Total | | 51 | 11 | 3 | 0 | 1 | 0 | 6 | 1 | 61 | 12 |
| Southampton | 2009–10 | League One | 19 | 3 | — | | — | | — | | 19 | 3 |
| Southampton | 2010–11 | League One | 15 | 0 | 1 | 0 | 2 | 0 | 1 | 0 | 19 | 0 |
| Southampton | 2011–12 | Championship | 8 | 0 | 1 | 0 | 0 | 0 | — | | 9 | 0 |
| Southampton | 2012–13 | Premier League | 32 | 6 | 1 | 0 | 1 | 1 | — | | 34 | 7 |
| Southampton | Total | | 74 | 9 | 3 | 0 | 3 | 1 | 1 | 0 | 81 | 10 |
| Millwall (loan) | 2010–11 | Championship | 7 | 5 | — | | — | | — | | 7 | 5 |
| Blackpool (loan) | 2010–11 | Premier League | 11 | 3 | — | | — | | — | | 11 | 3 |
| Queens Park Rangers (loan) | 2011–12 | Premier League | 2 | 0 | — | | — | | — | | 2 | 0 |
| Crystal Palace (loan) | 2013–14 | Premier League | 20 | 3 | 2 | 0 | 0 | 0 | — | | 22 | 3 |
| Crystal Palace | 2013–14 | Premier League | 14 | 4 | 0 | 0 | 0 | 0 | — | | 14 | 4 |
| Crystal Palace | 2014–15 | Premier League | 37 | 6 | 2 | 0 | 0 | 0 | — | | 39 | 6 |
| Crystal Palace | 2015–16 | Premier League | 31 | 2 | 4 | 1 | 0 | 0 | — | | 35 | 3 |
| Crystal Palace | 2016–17 | Premier League | 36 | 0 | 1 | 0 | 2 | 0 | — | | 39 | 0 |
| Crystal Palace | 2017–18 | Premier League | 10 | 0 | 0 | 0 | 2 | 0 | — | | 12 | 0 |
| Crystal Palace | 2018–19 | Premier League | 5 | 0 | — | | 3 | 0 | — | | 8 | 0 |
| Crystal Palace | Total | | 153 | 15 | 9 | 1 | 7 | 0 | 0 | 0 | 169 | 16 |
| Huddersfield Town (loan) | 2018–19 | Premier League | 6 | 0 | 1 | 0 | — | | — | | 7 | 0 |
| Pafos | 2019–20 | Cypriot First Division | 16 | 0 | 0 | 0 | — | | — | | 16 | 0 |
| Pafos | 2020–21 | Cypriot First Division | 29 | 4 | 1 | 0 | — | | — | | 30 | 4 |
| Pafos | 2021–22 | Cypriot First Division | 23 | 1 | 1 | 0 | — | | — | | 24 | 1 |
| Pafos | Total | | 68 | 5 | 2 | 0 | 0 | 0 | 0 | 0 | 80 | 5 |
| Anorthosis | 2022–23 | Cypriot First Division | 16 | 0 | 1 | 0 | — | | — | | 17 | 0 |
| Career total | | | 508 | 64 | 30 | 2 | 18 | 2 | 13 | 1 | 569 | 69 |

=== Managerial ===
As of end of 2024-2025 season

| Team | From | To | Record | | | | | | | |
| Team | From | To | P | W | D | L | GF | GA | GD | W% |
|---|---|---|---|---|---|---|---|---|---|---|
| Peyia 2014 | 1 July 2023 | 30 January 2024 | 18 | 8 | 3 | 7 | 25 | 18 | +7 | 44.4 |
| AEZ Zakakiou | 10 February 2024 | 7 March 2024 | 7 | 0 | 2 | 5 | 4 | 11 | −7 | 0.0 |
| Ayia Napa | 29 October 2024 | 19 November 2024 | 2 | 2 | 0 | 0 | 2 | 0 | +2 | 100.0 |
| Akritas Chlorakas | 20 November 2024 | June 2025 | 21 | 14 | 0 | 7 | 35 | 19 | +16 | 66.7 |
| Total | | | 48 | 24 | 5 | 19 | 66 | 48 | +18 | 50.0 |

== Honours ==
=== Player ===
Southampton

- Football League One runner-up: 2010–11

Crystal Palace

- FA Cup runner-up: 2015–16

Individual

- PFA Team of the Year: 2007–08 League Two, 2009–10 League One

=== Manager ===
Individual

- PASP Manager of the Season: 2024–25 Second Division

Sporting positions
| Preceded by Scott Dann | Captain of Crystal Palace; 2017–2018 | Succeeded by Luka Milivojević |
