= 2023–24 Cypriot Second Division =

Cypriot Second Division
- Season: 2023–24
- Dates: 15 September 2023 – 28 April 2024
- Champions: Omonia Aradippou (3rd title)
- Promoted: Omonia Aradippou; Omonia 29M; Enosis Neon Paralimni
- Relegated: ENAD Polis Chrysochous; Ermis Aradippou; P.O. Xylotymbou 2006
- Matches: 232
- Goals: 594 (2.56 per match)
- Top goalscorer: Michalis Charalambous (24 goals)
- Longest winning run: Enosis Neon Paralimni (6 matches)
- Longest unbeaten run: PAEEK (14 matches)
- Longest losing run: Ermis Aradippou (10 matches)

The 2023–24 Cypriot Second Division was the 69th season of the Cypriot second-level football league. The campaign started on the 15th of September 2023 and concluded on the 28th of April 2024.

== Teams ==
The league consisted of sixteen teams; ten teams remaining from the previous season, three teams promoted from the Cypriot Third Division, and three teams relegated from the Cypriot First Division.

Teams promoted to 2023-24 Cypriot First Division

- Othellos Athienou
- AEZ Zakakiou
- Ethnikos Achna

Teams relegated from 2022–23 Cypriot First Division

- Akritas Chlorakas
- Enosis Neon Paralimni
- Olympiakos Nicosia

Teams promoted from 2022–23 Cypriot Third Division

- ASIL Lysi
- Digenis Akritas Morphou
- ENAD Polis Chrysochous

Teams relegated to 2023–24 Cypriot Third Division

- Anagennisi Deryneia
- Olympias Lympion
- Alki Oroklini (withdrawn)

== Stadia and locations ==
Note: Table lists clubs in alphabetical order.

Club	Location
Achyronas-Onisilos	Sotira
Akritas Chlorakas	Chloraka
ASIL	Larnaca
Ayia Napa	Ayia Napa
Digenis Akritas Morphou	Morphou
ENAD Polis Chrysochous	Polis
Ermis Aradippou	Aradippou
Krasava ENY Ypsonas	Ypsonas
MEAP Nisou	Nisou
Olympiakos Nicosia	Nicosia
Omonia Aradippou	Aradippou
Omonia 29M	Nicosia
PAEEK	Lakatamia
Peyia 2014	Pegeia
P.O. Xylotymbou 2006	Xylotymbou

== Regular season ==
During the regular season, each team faced each other once (either at home or away). Afterwards, the table split into two groups, with the top eight teams entering the Promotion Round and the bottom eight teams entering the Relegation Round.

=== League table ===
Pos	Team	Pld	W	D	L	GF	GA	GD	Pts	Qualification
1	Enosis Neon Paralimni	15	10	3	2	22	11	+11	33	Qualification for the Promotion Round
2	Olympiakos Nicosia	15	9	3	3	20	10	+10	30	Qualification for the Promotion Round
3	Omonia Aradippou	15	8	5	2	20	10	+10	29	Qualification for the Promotion Round
4	Omonia 29M	15	8	4	3	18	11	+7	28	Qualification for the Promotion Round
5	Krasava ENY Ypsonas	15	7	6	2	20	11	+9	27 (Note: Head-to-head points: Krasava ENY Ypsonas 3, Peyia 2014 0.)	Qualification for the Promotion Round
6	Peyia 2014	15	8	3	4	24	11	+13	27	Qualification for the Promotion Round
7	ASIL Lysi	15	6	5	4	16	14	+2	23	Qualification for the Promotion Round
8	Ayia Napa	15	6	3	6	17	19	−2	21	Qualification for the Promotion Round
9	Achyronas-Onisilos	15	4	7	4	16	14	+2	19 (Note: Goal difference: Achyronas-Onisilos +2, Digenis Akritas Morphou -2.)	Qualification for the Relegation Round
10	Digenis Akritas Morphou	15	5	4	6	14	16	−2	19	Qualification for the Relegation Round
11	MEAP Nisou	15	4	3	8	11	19	−8	15	Qualification for the Relegation Round
12	P.O. Xylotymbou 2006	15	3	5	7	16	22	−6	14 (Note: Goal difference: P.O. Xylotymbou 2006 -6, PAEEK -7.)	Qualification for the Relegation Round
13	PAEEK	15	4	2	9	17	24	−7	14	Qualification for the Relegation Round
14	Akritas Chlorakas	15	3	3	9	15	22	−7	12 (Note: Head-to-head points: Akritas Chlorakas 3, ENAD Polis Chrysochous 0.)	Qualification for the Relegation Round
15	ENAD Polis Chrysochous	15	3	3	9	14	21	−7	12	Qualification for the Relegation Round
16	Ermis Aradippou	15	2	1	12	17	42	−25	7	Qualification for the Relegation Round

Source: CFA (in Greek)
Rules for classification: 1) Points; 2) Head-to-head points; 3) Head-to-head goal difference; 4) Head-to-head goals scored; 5) Head-to-head away goals scored (only if two teams); 6) Goal difference; 7) Goals scored; 8) Play-off (only if deciding championship round, relegation round or relegation).

=== Results ===
Home \ Away	ACH	AKR	ASI	AYI	DAM	EPC	ENP	ERM	KEY	MEA	OLY	OMO	O29	PAE	PEY	POX
Achyronas-Onisilos	—	2–1	—	3–0	0–0	—	0–3	—	—	—	1–2	—	—	1–1	0–1	—
Akritas Chlorakas	—	—	—	1–2	1–3	—	0–1	—	1–1	—	1–2	—	—	2–0	1–2	—
ASIL Lysi	0–0	2–0	—	0–0	2–1	—	1–3	—	—	1–1	—	1–2	1–1	—	—	—
Ayia Napa	—	—	—	—	—	2–0	—	6–3	1–1	0–1	0–0	—	—	3–2	0–3	1–0
Digenis Akritas Morphou	—	—	—	0–1	—	—	0–2	2–1	1–2	—	0–3	—	—	1–0	2–2	—
ENAD Polis Chrysochous	2–2	1–2	1–2	—	0–1	—	0–1	—	—	1–2	—	0–1	1–1	—	—	—
Enosis Neon Paralimni	—	—	—	2–1	—	—	—	2–1	0–0	1–0	1–1	—	—	2–1	1–1	2–1
Ermis Aradippou	0–3	1–1	0–2	—	—	1–3	—	—	—	—	—	1–2	0–3	—	—	6–2
Krasava ENY Ypsonas	1–2	—	1–1	—	—	2–0	—	2–0	—	—	—	0–0	2–0	—	—	3–3
MEAP Nisou	1–1	0–2	—	—	0–0	—	—	1–2	1–0	—	—	—	0–1	0–4	—	—
Olympiakos Nicosia	—	—	2–0	—	—	1–3	—	2–0	0–1	1–0	—	1–0	—	0–1	—	1–1
Omonia Aradippou	0–0	3–1	—	1–0	0–0	—	3–1	—	—	2–1	—	—	1–1	—	0–2	—
Omonia 29M	1–1	1–0	—	2–0	0–3	—	1–0	—	—	—	1–2	—	—	—	2–0	—
PAEEK	—	—	0–2	—	—	2–0	—	3–1	1–2	—	—	1–5	0–2	—	—	1–1
Peyia 2014	—	—	2–0	—	—	0–0	—	8–0	0–2	0–1	0–2	—	—	2–0	—	1–0
P.O. Xylotymbou 2006	1–0	1–1	0–1	—	2–0	1–2	—	—	—	3–2	—	0–0	0–1	—	—	—

Source: CFA (in Greek)
Legend: Blue = home team win; Yellow = draw; Red = away team win.
For upcoming matches, an "a" indicates there is an article about the rivalry between the two participants.

== Promotion Round ==
The top eight teams from the regular season faced each other twice more (once at home and once away), with the top three teams earning promotion to the Cypriot First Division. Results from the regular season were carried over into this round.

=== League table ===
Pos	Team	Pld	W	D	L	GF	GA	GD	Pts	Promotion
1	Omonia Aradippou (C, P)	14	10	2	2	26	9	+17	61	Promotion to the Cypriot First Division
2	Omonia 29M (P)	14	9	3	2	28	10	+18	58	Promotion to the Cypriot First Division
3	Enosis Neon Paralimni (P)	14	6	3	5	22	22	0	54 (Note: Head-to-head points: Enosis Neon Paralimni 6, Olympiakos Nicosia 0.)	Promotion to the Cypriot First Division
4	Olympiakos Nicosia	14	7	3	4	23	11	+12	54	
5	Krasava ENY Ypsonas	14	5	2	7	19	25	−6	44	
6	ASIL Lysi	14	6	2	6	20	22	−2	43	
7	Peyia 2014	14	1	2	11	9	33	−24	32	
8	Ayia Napa	14	2	3	9	18	33	−15	30	

Source: CFA (in Greek)
Rules for classification: 1) Points; 2) Head-to-head points; 3) Head-to-head goal difference; 4) Head-to-head goals scored; 5) Head-to-head away goals scored (only if two teams); 6) Goal difference; 7) Goals scored; 8) Play-off (only if deciding championship round, relegation round or relegation).
(C) Champions; (P) Promoted

=== Results ===
Home \ Away	ASI	AYI	ENP	KEY	OLY	OMO	O29	PEY
ASIL Lysi	—	3–2	1–2	2–1	0–2	0–0	0–4	4–0
Ayia Napa	1–2	—	1–3	3–3	0–3	1–4	1–5	2–2
Enosis Neon Paralimni	3–4	0–3	—	1–2	2–1	0–2	2–1	0–0
Krasava ENY Ypsonas	0–2	2–0	2–2	—	1–5	1–0	2–3	1–0
Olympiakos Nicosia	1–0	1–1	1–2	1–0	—	2–2	0–0	4–0
Omonia Aradippou	3–1	2–0	2–0	3–1	1–0	—	1–2	2–0
Omonia 29M	0–0	3–0	1–1	2–0	1–0	1–2	—	2–0
Peyia 2014	3–1	0–3	1–4	1–3	1–2	0–2	1–3	—

Source: CFA (in Greek)
Legend: Blue = home team win; Yellow = draw; Red = away team win.
For upcoming matches, an "a" indicates there is an article about the rivalry between the two participants.

== Relegation Round ==
The bottom eight teams from the regular season faced each other twice more (once at home and once away), with the bottom three teams being relegated to the Cypriot Third Division. Results from the regular season were carried over into this round.

=== League table ===
Pos	Team	Pld	W	D	L	GF	GA	GD	Pts	Relegation
9	Digenis Akritas Morphou	14	10	2	2	27	13	+14	51	
10	PAEEK	14	9	5	0	30	10	+20	46	
11	Achyronas-Onisilos	14	4	5	5	16	18	−2	36	
12	Akritas Chlorakas	14	7	2	5	20	11	+9	35	
13	MEAP Nisou	14	4	6	4	18	19	−1	33	
14	ENAD Polis Chrysochous (R)	14	4	2	8	18	20	−2	26	Relegation to the Cypriot Third Division
15	Ermis Aradippou (R)	14	4	1	9	11	28	−17	20 (Note: Head-to-head points: Ermis Aradippou 6, P.O. Xylotymbou 2006 0.)	Relegation to the Cypriot Third Division
16	P.O. Xylotymbou 2006 (R)	14	1	3	10	12	33	−21	20	Relegation to the Cypriot Third Division

Source: CFA (in Greek)
Rules for classification: 1) Points; 2) Head-to-head points; 3) Head-to-head goal difference; 4) Head-to-head goals scored; 5) Head-to-head away goals scored (only if two teams); 6) Goal difference; 7) Goals scored; 8) Play-off (only if deciding championship round, relegation round or relegation).
(R) Relegated

=== Results ===
Home \ Away	ACH	AKR	DAM	EPC	ERM	MEA	PAE	POX
Achyronas-Onisilos	—	3–0	0–0	1–1	0–1	1–1	1–1	1–0
Akritas Chlorakas	3–0	—	1–0	0–0	3–0	1–1	1–2	4–0
Digenis Akritas Morphou	2–1	1–0	—	3–0	1–0	3–1	3–3	2–1
ENAD Polis Chrysochous	2–1	0–1	3–4	—	1–2	1–0	0–1	3–1
Ermis Aradippou	0–1	0–2	0–3	0–5	—	1–2	1–3	2–1
MEAP Nisou	2–2	3–1	0–2	1–0	0–0	—	0–3	1–1
PAEEK	3–0	1–0	3–1	3–1	5–0	1–1	—	1–1
P.O. Xylotymbou 2006	2–4	0–3	0–2	2–1	1–4	2–5	0–0	—

Source: CFA (in Greek)
Legend: Blue = home team win; Yellow = draw; Red = away team win.
For upcoming matches, an "a" indicates there is an article about the rivalry between the two participants.
