= 2022–23 Cypriot Second Division =

Cypriot Second Division
- Season: 2022–23
- Dates: 9 September 2022 – 30 April 2023
- Champions: Othellos Athienou (1st title)
- Runner up: AEZ Zakakiou
- Promoted: Othellos Athienou; AEZ Zakakiou; Ethnikos Achna
- Relegated: Anagennisi Deryneia; Olympias Lympion; Alki Oroklini
- Matches: 218
- Goals: 551 (2.53 per match)
- Top goalscorer: Dimitrios Diamantopoulos (15 goals)
- Biggest home win: Achyronas-Onisilos 8–1 Alki Oroklini (22 December 2022)
- Biggest away win: Olympias Lympion 0–8 P.O. Xylotymbou (29 April 2023)
- Highest scoring: Achyronas-Onisilos 8–1 Alki Oroklini (22 December 2022)
- Longest unbeaten run: Othellos Athienou (7 matches)
- Longest winless run: Olympias Lympion (13 matches)
- Longest losing run: Olympias Lympion (9 matches)

The 2022–23 Cypriot Second Division was the 68th season of the Cypriot second-level football league. The campaign started on the 9th of September 2022 and concluded on the 30th of April 2023.

== Teams ==
The league consisted of sixteen teams; eleven teams remaining from the previous season, four teams promoted from the Cypriot Third Division, and two teams relegated from the Cypriot First Division.

Teams promoted to 2022-23 Cypriot First Division

- Karmiotissa
- Nea Salamis Famagusta
- Akritas Chlorakas
- Enosis Neon Paralimni

Teams relegated from 2021–22 Cypriot First Division

- Ethnikos Achna
- PAEEK

Teams promoted from 2021–22 Cypriot Third Division

- Peyia 2014
- MEAP Nisou
- Krasava ENY
- AEZ Zakakiou

Teams relegated to 2022-23 Cypriot Third Division

- ASIL Lysi
Locations of the 2025–26 Cypriot Second Division teams.

Note: Table lists clubs in alphabetical order.

Club	Location
Achyronas-Onisilos	Sotira
AEZ Zakakiou	Zakaki
Alki Oroklini	Oroklini
Anagennisi Deryneia	Deryneia
Ayia Napa	Ayia Napa
Ermis Aradippou	Aradippou
Ethnikos Achna	Achna
Krasava ENY Ypsonas	Ypsonas
MEAP Nisou	Nisou
Olympias Lympion	Lympia
Omonia Aradippou	Aradippou
Othellos Athienou	Athienou
PAC Omonia 29M	Nicosia
PAEEK	Lakatamia
Peyia 2014	Pegeia
P.O. Xylotymbou	Xylotymbou

== Regular season ==
During the regular season, each team faced each other once (either at home or away). Afterwards, the table split into two groups, with the top eight teams entering the Promotion Round and the bottom eight teams entering the Relegation Round.

=== League table ===
Pos	Team	Pld	W	D	L	GF	GA	GD	Pts	Qualification
1	AEZ Zakakiou	15	9	4	2	23	9	+14	31	Qualification for the Promotion Round
2	Othellos Athienou	15	10	0	5	23	15	+8	30	Qualification for the Promotion Round
3	Ethnikos Achna	15	9	2	4	24	19	+5	29	Qualification for the Promotion Round
4	Achyronas-Onisilos	15	8	3	4	26	13	+13	27	Qualification for the Promotion Round
5	Peyia 2014	15	7	5	3	18	12	+6	26	Qualification for the Promotion Round
6	PAC Omonia 29M	15	7	4	4	18	12	+6	25	Qualification for the Promotion Round
7	Omonia Aradippou	15	6	5	4	22	18	+4	23	Qualification for the Promotion Round
8	MEAP Nisou	15	7	1	7	13	15	−2	22	Qualification for the Promotion Round
9	PAEEK	15	6	4	5	16	16	0	22	Qualification for the Relegation Round
10	Ermis Aradippou	15	5	5	5	16	18	−2	20	Qualification for the Relegation Round
11	Krasava Ypsonas	15	5	4	6	26	24	+2	19	Qualification for the Relegation Round
12	P.O. Xylotymbou	15	5	3	7	23	28	−5	18	Qualification for the Relegation Round
13	Ayia Napa	15	5	2	8	18	18	0	17	Qualification for the Relegation Round
14	Anagennisi Deryneia	15	3	4	8	17	24	−7	13	Qualification for the Relegation Round
15	Alki Oroklini	15	2	3	10	10	33	−23	9	Qualification for the Relegation Round
16	Olympias Lympion	15	1	1	13	8	27	−19	4	Qualification for the Relegation Round

Source: CFA
Rules for classification: 1) Points; 2) Head-to-head points; 3) Head-to-head goal difference; 4) Head-to-head goals scored; 5) Head-to-head away goals scored (only if two teams); 6) Goal difference; 7) Goals scored; 8) Play-off (only if deciding championship round, relegation round or relegation).

=== Results ===
Home \ Away	ACH	AEZ	ALK	ANA	AYI	ERM	ETH	KRA	MEA	OLY	OMO	O29	PAE	PEY	POX
Achyronas-Onisilos	—		8–1	3–3			2–1	2–0			0–2		0–1		2–0
AEZ Zakakiou	0–0	—			1–0		1–2		1–0	2–0		0–0			
Alki Oroklini		0–0	—	0–5	2–0	1–3		1–3	0–1					0–0	
Anagennisi Deryneia		0–3		—	0–3	0–0		1–1	0–1	2–0			1–0	1–2	
Ayia Napa	2–0				—		1–2		1–1	1–1		2–0			1–2
Ermis Aradippou	0–1	2–1			0–3	—			0–1	1–0		1–1	1–1	1–3	
Ethnikos Achna			3–0	2–0		1–2	—	0–4			2–2		2–2		3–2
Krasava Ypsonas		1–2			1–0	2–2		—	1–3	3–0		1–1	1–3	2–2	
MEAP Nisou	0–3						0–1		—	1–0	1–2	0–1			2–1
Olympias Lympion	0–2		1–2				0–1			—	0–2	1–3			3–4
Omonia Aradippou		1–4	0–0	2–2	4–0	0–0		4–3			—			0–2	
PAC Omonia 29M	1–0		3–0	3–1			0–1				0–2	—	1–2		1–0
PAEEK		2–2	1–0		0–2				0–1	0–2	1–0		—		1–1
Peyia 2014	1–1	0–1			2–1		0–1		1–0	1–0		1–1	1–2	—	
P.O. Xylotymbou		0–2	4–3	2–1		2–3		2–1			1–1			1–1	—

Updated to match(es) played on 7 January 2023. Source: CFA
Legend: Blue = home team win; Yellow = draw; Red = away team win.
For upcoming matches, an "a" indicates there is an article about the rivalry between the two participants.

== Promotion Round ==
The top eight teams from the regular season face each other twice more (once at home and once away), with the top three teams earning promotion to the Cypriot First Division. Results from the regular season were carried over into this round.

=== League table ===
Pos	Team	Pld	W	D	L	GF	GA	GD	Pts	Promotion
1	Othellos Athienou (C, P)	14	9	2	3	23	13	+10	59	Promotion to the Cypriot First Division
2	AEZ Zakakiou (P)	14	7	4	3	23	12	+11	56	Promotion to the Cypriot First Division
3	Ethnikos Achna (P)	14	7	5	2	22	8	+14	55	Promotion to the Cypriot First Division
4	PAC Omonia 29M	14	7	4	3	14	11	+3	50	
5	Achyronas-Onisilos	14	2	7	5	16	21	−5	40	
6	Peyia 2014	14	3	4	7	7	17	−10	39	
7	MEAP Nisou	14	3	2	9	11	26	−15	33	
8	Omonia Aradippou	14	1	6	7	7	15	−8	32	

Source: CFA (in Greek)
Rules for classification: 1) Points; 2) Head-to-head points; 3) Head-to-head goal difference; 4) Head-to-head goals scored; 5) Head-to-head away goals scored (only if two teams); 6) Goal difference; 7) Goals scored; 8) Play-off (only if deciding championship round, relegation round or relegation).
(C) Champions; (P) Promoted

=== Results ===
Home \ Away	ACH	AEZ	ETH	MEA	OMO	OTH	O29	PEY
Achyronas-Onisilos	—	1–4	0–4	5–0	0–0	0–2	0–1	1–1
AEZ Zakakiou	0–0	—	2–2	0–0	4–1	2–0	1–3	4–0
Ethnikos Achna	1–1	1–0	—	5–0	1–0	2–1	1–1	3–0
MEAP Nisou	4–4	0–2	0–1	—	0–1	1–2	1–2	0–1
Omonia Aradippou	2–2	1–2	0–0	0–1	—	0–0	0–1	0–1
Othellos Athienou	1–0	3–1	1–0	2–3	2–1	—	4–1	2–0
PAC Omonia 29M	1–2	0–0	1–0	1–0	0–0	1–1	—	1–0
Peyia 2014	0–0	0–1	1–1	0–1	1–1	1–2	1–0	—

Updated to match(es) played on 30 April 2023. Source: CFA
Legend: Blue = home team win; Yellow = draw; Red = away team win.
For upcoming matches, an "a" indicates there is an article about the rivalry between the two participants.

== Relegation Round ==
The bottom eight teams from the regular season face each other twice more (once at home and once away), with the bottom three teams being relegated to the Cypriot Third Division. Results from the regular season were carried over into this round.

=== League table ===
Pos	Team	Pld	W	D	L	GF	GA	GD	Pts	Relegation
9	P.O. Xylotymbou	12	6	3	3	23	11	+12	39	
10	PAEEK	12	4	5	3	19	14	+5	39	
11	Ermis Aradippou	12	5	2	5	16	14	+2	37	
12	Krasava Ypsonas	12	4	4	4	25	19	+6	35	
13	Ayia Napa	12	5	2	5	12	15	−3	34	
14	Anagennisi Deryneia (R)	12	6	2	4	19	22	−3	33	Relegation to the Cypriot Third Division
15	Olympias Lympion (R)	12	1	4	7	13	32	−19	11	Relegation to the Cypriot Third Division
16	Alki Oroklini (R)	0	0	0	0	0	0	0	6	Relegation to the Cypriot Third Division

Source: CFA (in Greek)
Rules for classification: 1) Points; 2) Head-to-head points; 3) Head-to-head goal difference; 4) Head-to-head goals scored; 5) Head-to-head away goals scored (only if two teams); 6) Goal difference; 7) Goals scored; 8) Play-off (only if deciding championship round, relegation round or relegation).
(R) Relegated

Notes:

- Alki Oroklini has been deducted 3 points.

=== Results ===
Home \ Away	ALK	ANA	AYI	ERM	KRA	OLY	PAE	POX
Alki Oroklini	—	CANCL	CANCL	CANCL	1–8	CANCL	CANCL	CANCL
Anagennisi Deryneia	CANCL	—	2–0	0–2	2–2	2–2	2–1	1–0
Ayia Napa	CANCL	0–1	—	1–0	1–0	2–0	3–3	1–0
Ermis Aradippou	2–0	2–3	2–0	—	2–2	0–0	0–1	1–3
Krasava Ypsonas	CANCL	4–1	1–1	2–3	—	4–1	3–1	2–3
Olympias Lympion	CANCL	2–4	0–1	0–2	2–4	—	0–0	0–8
PAEEK	CANCL	4–0	3–0	2–1	1–1	3–4	—	0–0
P.O. Xylotymbou	CANCL	3–1	3–2	0–1	1–0	2–2	0–0	—

Updated to match(es) played on 29 April 2023. Source: CFA
Legend: Blue = home team win; Yellow = draw; Red = away team win.
For upcoming matches, an "a" indicates there is an article about the rivalry between the two participants.
