= Jad Smaira =

Lebanese footballer (born 2003)

Personal information
- Full name: Jad Victor Karim Smaira
- Date of birth: 9 November 2003 (age 23)
- Place of birth: Zug, Switzerland
- Height: 1.95 m (6 ft 5 in)
- Position: Centre-back

Team information
- Current team: Karmiotissa
- Number: 44

Youth career
- 2020–2021: Dubai City
- 2024: Dordrecht

College career
Years	Team	Apps	(Gls)
2021–2023	Holy Cross Crusaders	25	(0)

Senior career*
Years	Team	Apps	(Gls)
2024–2025	AEK Athens B	0	(0)
2025–2026	Achyronas-Onisilos	29	(0)
2026–	Karmiotissa	2	(0)

International career^{‡}
2025–2026	Lebanon U23	6	(0)
2024–	Lebanon	5	(0)
- * Club domestic league appearances and goals as of 6 November 2026 ‡ National team caps and goals as of 17 November 2026

Jad Victor Karim Smaira (Arabic: جاد فيكتور كريم سميرة; born 9 November 2003) is a footballer who plays as a centre-back for Cypriot First Division club Karmiotissa. Born in Switzerland, he plays for the Lebanon national team.

== Early life ==
Smaira was born in Zug, Switzerland, to parents Karim and Johanna. He has two younger brothers, Nadim and Rayan. During his childhood, he relocated to Dubai, United Arab Emirates, due to his father's work. Smaira attended the Lycée Libanais Francophone Privé in Dubai.

== Club career ==
Smaira began his football career at Dubai City, where he won the Dubai Super Cup trophy. In 2021, he joined the Holy Cross Crusaders, the soccer team of the College of the Holy Cross in Worcester, Massachusetts. During his three seasons at the club, Smaira made 25 appearances in the Patriot League conference of the NCAA Division I, starting in 23 matches. In February 2024, he signed with Dordrecht's under-21 team on a contract lasting until the end of the season.

After spending half a season at AEK Athens B in the Super League Greece 2, Smaira transferred to Achyronas-Onisilos in the Cypriot Second Division on a one-year contract on 16 January 2025. On 2 June 2026, his contract was extended until summer 2026.

Smaira joined Cypriot First Division side Karmiotissa on 21 July 2026. He made his debut on 25 September 2026, as a second-half substitute in a 5–0 defeat to Apollon Limassol, in which he received a red card.

== International career ==
Smaira received his first call-up to the Lebanon national team in December 2024, ahead of two friendly matches against Kuwait. He made his international debut in both games, appearing as a substitute on each occasion. Smaira was called up to the under-23 team for the 2026 AFC U-23 Asian Cup qualification, where he contributed to the team's first-ever qualification for the final tournament. He was called up for the final tournament, held in Saudi Arabia in January 2026.

== Personal life ==
Smaira holds Lebanese, Greek, and Canadian nationality. He is fluent in French, Arabic, and English. During his studies at the College of the Holy Cross, he completed an internship at PwC Middle East in Dubai in the summer of 2022.

== Career statistics ==
=== Club ===
As of match played 6 November 2026

Appearances and goals by club, season and competition
Club	Season	League			National cup (Note: Includes Greek Cup, Cypriot Cup)		Total	
Club	Season	Division	Apps	Goals	Apps	Goals	Apps	Goals
AEK Athens B	2024–25	Super League Greece 2	0	0	—		0	0
Achyronas-Onisilos	2024–25	Cypriot Second Division	7	0	—		7	0
Achyronas-Onisilos	2025–26	Cypriot Second Division	22	0	1	0	23	0
Achyronas-Onisilos	Total		29	0	1	0	30	0
Karmiotissa	2026–27	Cypriot First Division	2	0	0	0	2	0
Career total			31	0	1	0	32	0

=== International ===
As of match played 17 November 2026

Appearances and goals by national team and year
National team	Year	Apps	Goals
Lebanon	2024	2	0
Lebanon	2025	0	0
Lebanon	2026	3	0
Total		5	0

== See also ==
- List of Lebanon international footballers born outside Lebanon
