= 2021–22 Cypriot Second Division =

Cypriot Second Division
- Season: 2021–22
- Dates: 10 September 2021 – 14 May 2022
- Champions: Karmiotissa (2nd title)
- Runner up: Nea Salamis Famagusta
- Promoted: Karmiotissa; Nea Salamis Famagusta; Akritas Chlorakas; Enosis Neon Paralimni
- Relegated: ASIL Lysi
- Matches: 240
- Goals: 614 (2.56 per match)
- Top goalscorer: Ioannis Chatzivasilis (20 goals)
- Biggest home win: Onisilos Sotira 6-0 Omonia Aradippou (20 November 2021)
- Biggest away win: Alki Oroklini 0-6 Karmiotissa (14 May 2022)
- Highest scoring: Achyronas Liopetriou 6-2 Ermis Aradippou (30 April 2022)
- Longest unbeaten run: Karmiotissa (12 matches)
- Longest winless run: Achyronas Liopetriou (11 matches)
- Longest losing run: ASIL (6 matches)

The 2021–22 Cypriot Second Division is the 67th season of the Cypriot second-level football league. The campaign started on the 10th of September 2021 and concluded on the 14th of May 2022.

== Teams ==
The league consisted of sixteen teams; ten teams remaining from the previous season, two teams promoted from the Cypriot Third Division, and four teams relegated from the Cypriot First Division.

Teams promoted to 2021-22 Cypriot First Division

- PAEEK
- Aris Limassol

Teams relegated from 2020–21 Cypriot First Division

- Nea Salamis Famagusta
- Ermis Aradippou
- Enosis Neon Paralimni
- Karmiotissa

Teams promoted from 2020–21 Cypriot Third Division

- Omonia 29M
- Olympias Lympion

Teams relegated to 2021–22 Cypriot Third Division

- Kouris Erimis
- Digenis Akritas Morphou
- AEZ Zakakiou
- Omonia Psevda
- THOI Lakatamia
- Enosi Neon Ypsona-Digenis

Note: Table lists clubs in alphabetical order.

Club	Location
Achyronas Liopetriou	Liopetri
Akritas Chlorakas	Chlorakas
Alki Oroklini	Oroklini
Anagennisi Deryneia	Deryneia
ASIL	Larnaca
Ayia Napa	Ayia Napa
Enosis Neon Paralimni	Paralimni
Ermis Aradippou	Aradippou
Karmiotissa	Pano Polemidia
Nea Salamis Famagusta	Ammochostos
Olympias Lympion	Lympia
Omonia Aradippou	Aradippou
Onisilos Sotira	Sotira
Othellos Athienou	Athienou
PAC Omonia 29M	Nicosia
P.O. Xylotymbou	Xylotymbou

== Season ==
During the season, each team faced each other twice, home and away.

=== League table ===
Pos	Team	Pld	W	D	L	GF	GA	GD	Pts	Result
1	Karmiotissa (C, P)	30	19	6	5	52	20	+32	63	Promotion to the Cypriot First Division
2	Nea Salamis Famagusta (P)	30	20	3	7	59	24	+35	63	Promotion to the Cypriot First Division
3	Akritas Chlorakas (P)	30	17	7	6	49	26	+23	58	Promotion to the Cypriot First Division
4	Enosis Neon Paralimni (P)	30	16	9	5	48	24	+24	57	Promotion to the Cypriot First Division
5	Alki Oroklini	30	14	5	11	36	38	−2	47	
6	Ermis Aradippou	30	12	8	10	43	42	+1	44	
7	Othellos Athienou	30	13	3	14	40	53	−13	42	
8	P.O. Xylotymbou	30	10	8	12	39	42	−3	38	
9	Anagennisi Deryneia	30	10	7	13	33	40	−7	37	
10	PAC Omonia 29M	30	9	9	12	31	33	−2	36	
11	Omonia Aradippou	30	9	8	13	30	44	−14	35	
12	Onisilos Sotira	30	9	6	15	34	44	−10	33	
13	Ayia Napa	30	8	7	15	41	52	−11	31	
14	Achyronas Liopetriou	30	8	7	15	28	41	−13	31	
15	Olympias Lympion	30	7	7	16	23	44	−21	28	
16	ASIL (R)	30	5	8	17	28	47	−19	23	Relegation to the Cypriot Third Division

Source: CFA
Rules for classification: 1) Points; 2) Head-to-head points; 3) Head-to-head goal difference; 4) Head-to-head goals scored; 5) Head-to-head away goals scored (only if two teams); 6) Goal difference; 7) Goals scored; 8) Play-off (only if deciding championship round, relegation round or relegation).
(C) Champions; (P) Promoted; (R) Relegated
