= Mahmoud Kojok =

Mahmoud Kojok may refer to:

- Mahmoud Ahmad Kojok (born 1990), Lebanese association football midfielder
- Mahmoud Mohammad Kojok (born 1991), Lebanese association football striker
