= 2025–26 Cypriot Second Division =

Cypriot Second Division
- Season: 2025–26
- Dates: 12 September 2025 - 25 April 2026
- Champions: Nea Salamina
- Promoted: Nea Salamina; Karmiotissa; Omonia 29M
- Relegated: Ethnikos Latsion; AEZ; Achyronas-Onisilos
- Matches: 232
- Goals: 628 (2.71 per match)
- Top goalscorer: Steve Ambri (20 goals)
- Biggest home win: Omonia 29M 7–0 MEAP (10 January 2026)
- Biggest away win: Achyronas 0–5 Omonia 29M (3 January 2026)
- Highest scoring: Ayia Napa 5-5 ASIL (21 March 2026)
- Longest winning run: 11 matches Nea Salamina (19 December 2025 - 7 March 2026)
- Longest unbeaten run: 27 matches Nea Salamina (12 September 2025 - 4 April 2026)
- Longest winless run: 16 matches Achyronas (3 January 2026 - 25 April 2026)
- Longest losing run: 6 matches Achyronas (13 September 2025 - 1 November 2025)

The 2025–26 Cypriot Second Division is the 71st season of the Cypriot second-level football league. The campaign started on the 12th of September 2025 and finished on the 25th of April 2026.

== Teams ==
The league consisted of sixteen teams; ten teams remaining from the previous season, three teams promoted from the Cypriot Third Division, and three teams relegated from the Cypriot First Division.

Teams promoted to 2025-26 Cypriot First Division

- Krasava Ypsonas
- Olympiakos Nicosia
- Akritas Chlorakas

Teams relegated from 2024–25 Cypriot First Division

- Karmiotissa
- Nea Salamis Famagusta
- Omonia 29M

Teams promoted from 2024–25 Cypriot Third Division

- Ethnikos Latsion
- APEA Akrotiri
- Iraklis Gerolakkou

Teams relegated to 2025-26 Cypriot Third Division

- Anagennisi Deryneia
- Othellos Athienou
- Peyia 2014 (Dissolved)

== Stadia and locations ==
Locations of the 2025–26 Cypriot Second Division teams.

Note: Table lists clubs in alphabetical order.

Club	Location	Stadium	Capacity
Achyronas-Onisilos	Sotira	Liopetri Community Stadium	1,000
AEZ Zakakiou	Limassol	Kouklia Community Stadium	1,500
APEA Akrotiri	Akrotiri	Kouklia Community Stadium	1,500
ASIL	Larnaca	Olympias Lympion Ground	1,000
Ayia Napa	Ayia Napa	Ayia Napa Municipal Stadium	2,000
Chalkanoras Idaliou	Dali, Nicosia	Chalkanoras Stadium	1,000
Digenis Akritas Morphou	Nicosia	Katokopia Stadium	3,500
Doxa Katokopias	Katokopia	Katokopia Stadium	3,500
Ethnikos Latsion	Latsia, Nicosia	Katokopia Stadium	3,500
Iraklis Gerolakkou	Kato Deftera, Nicosia	Keryneia Epistrofi Stadium	2,500
Karmiotissa	Limassol	Pano Polemidia Community Stadium	1,500
MEAP Nisou	Nisou, Nicosia	Theodorio Community Stadium	1,000
Nea Salamis Famagusta	Larnaca	Ammochostos Stadium	5,500
Omonia 29M	Nicosia	Katokopia Stadium	3,500
PAEEK	Lakatamia, Nicosia	Keryneia Epistrofi Stadium	2,500
Spartakos Kitiou	Kiti	Dromolaxia Community Stadium	500

== Regular season ==
During the regular season, each team faced each other once (either at home or away). Afterwards, the table split into two groups, with the top eight teams entering the Promotion Round and the bottom eight teams entering the Relegation Round.

=== League table ===
Pos	Team	Pld	W	D	L	GF	GA	GD	Pts	Qualification
1	Nea Salamis Famagusta	15	13	2	0	27	5	+22	41	Qualification for the Promotion Round
2	PAEEK	15	8	5	2	23	8	+15	29	Qualification for the Promotion Round
3	Doxa Katokopias	15	8	3	4	21	12	+9	27	Qualification for the Promotion Round
4	Omonia 29M	15	7	5	3	30	15	+15	26	Qualification for the Promotion Round
5	Ayia Napa	15	7	5	3	20	15	+5	26	Qualification for the Promotion Round
6	Karmiotissa	15	8	3	4	25	15	+10	24	Qualification for the Promotion Round
7	ASIL Lysi	15	6	5	4	14	13	+1	23	Qualification for the Promotion Round
8	MEAP Nisou	15	6	3	6	18	27	−9	21	Qualification for the Promotion Round
9	Digenis Akritas Morphou	15	6	2	7	23	18	+5	20	Qualification for the Relegation Round
10	APEA Akrotiri	15	5	3	7	19	23	−4	18	Qualification for the Relegation Round
11	Chalkanoras Idaliou	15	5	2	8	23	26	−3	17	Qualification for the Relegation Round
12	Spartakos Kitiou	15	3	7	5	15	20	−5	16	Qualification for the Relegation Round
13	Iraklis Gerolakkou	15	2	7	6	11	19	−8	13	Qualification for the Relegation Round
14	Ethnikos Latsion	15	3	3	9	11	28	−17	12	Qualification for the Relegation Round
15	AEZ Zakakiou	15	2	4	9	11	23	−12	10	Qualification for the Relegation Round
16	Achyronas-Onisilos	15	1	1	13	6	30	−24	4	Qualification for the Relegation Round

Updated to match(es) played on 11 January 2026. Source: CFA
Rules for classification: 1) Points; 2) Head-to-head points; 3) Head-to-head goal difference; 4) Head-to-head goals scored; 5) Head-to-head away goals scored (only if two teams); 6) Goal difference; 7) Goals scored; 8) Play-off (only if deciding championship round, relegation round or relegation).

Notes:

- Karmiotissa FC has been deducted 3 points.

=== Results ===
Home \ Away	ACH	AEZ	APE	ASI	AYI	CHA	DIG	DOX	ETH	IRA	KAR	MEA	NSF	O29	PAE	SPA
Achyronas-Onisilos	—		0–1	0–1	1–2				0–1	1–2		0–1		0–5		0–2
AEZ Zakakiou	0–2	—	1–1			1–1			2–0	0–1				2–4		2–2
APEA Akrotiri			—	3–0	3–3		0–4	1–2	3–0			1–2		0–3		0–0
ASIL Lysi		2–0		—	1–1		1–0	1–2			1–0	0–0	0–1		1–1	
Ayia Napa		1–0			—				2–0		0–0		0–2	0–1	0–0	2–0
Chalkanoras Idaliou	5–1		1–0	1–2	1–2	—			4–2	1–1				2–1		2–3
Digenis Akritas Morphou	1–1	1–2			1–2	3–2	—	0–2			3–1		0–2		0–2	
Doxa Katokopias	2–0	0–0			1–1	2–1		—		1–0	0–1		0–1		0–2	
Ethnikos Latsion				1–0			0–3	0–2	—			1–4	0–2	1–1		1–1
Iraklis Gerolakkou			1–2	1–1	2–4		1–1		0–1	—		1–1		0–0		1–1
Karmiotissa	3–0	3–0	1–2			2–0			3–2	2–0	—				2–1	
MEAP Nisou		1–0			2–0	1–2	0–3	3–2			1–3	—	1–4		0–2	
Nea Salamis Famagusta	3–0	2–1	2–0			1–0				0–0	0–0		—		2–1	
Omonia 29M				1–1			0–3	1–1			3–2	7–0	2–3	—	0–0	
PAEEK	1–0	2–0	3–2			4–0			1–1	3–0					—	0–0
Spartakos Kitiou				1–2			2–0	0–4			2–2	1–1	0–2	0–1		—

Updated to match(es) played on 11 January 2026. Source: CFA
Legend: Blue = home team win; Yellow = draw; Red = away team win.
For upcoming matches, an "a" indicates there is an article about the rivalry between the two participants.

== Promotion Round ==
The top eight teams from the regular season face each other twice more (once at home and once away), with the top three teams earning promotion to the Cypriot First Division. Results from the regular season were carried over into this round.

=== League table ===
Pos	Team	Pld	W	D	L	GF	GA	GD	Pts	Promotion
1	Nea Salamis Famagusta (C, P)	14	11	2	1	29	10	+19	76	Promotion to the Cypriot First Division
2	Karmiotissa (P)	14	8	5	1	29	11	+18	53	Promotion to the Cypriot First Division
3	Omonia 29M (P)	14	7	6	1	30	18	+12	53	Promotion to the Cypriot First Division
4	PAEEK	14	4	5	5	19	23	−4	46	
5	Doxa Katokopias	14	4	3	7	13	23	−10	42	
6	Ayia Napa	14	4	3	7	22	28	−6	41	
7	ASIL Lysi	14	2	2	10	18	37	−19	31	
8	MEAP Nisou	14	2	2	10	13	23	−10	29	

Updated to match(es) played on 25 April 2026. Source: CFA (in Greek)
Rules for classification: 1) Points; 2) Head-to-head points; 3) Head-to-head goal difference; 4) Head-to-head goals scored; 5) Head-to-head away goals scored (only if two teams); 6) Goal difference; 7) Goals scored; 8) Play-off (only if deciding championship round, relegation round or relegation).
(C) Champions; (P) Promoted

=== Results ===
Home \ Away	ASI	AYI	DOX	KAR	MEA	NSF	O29	PAE
ASIL Lysi	—	2–3	2–0	2–6	2–1	1–2	0–1	1–3
Ayia Napa	5–5	—	1–2	0–2	0–2	0–2	0–2	6–3
Doxa Katokopias	1–0	0–3	—	1–1	0–2	0–2	1–2	0–0
Karmiotissa	5–0	3–0	2–2	—	1–0	1–0	1–1	2–1
MEAP Nisou	0–0	0–2	0–2	1–3	—	2–4	3–3	1–2
Nea Salamis Famagusta	4–1	3–0	2–1	1–0	1–0	—	2–1	4–1
Omonia 29M	3–1	2–2	5–1	2–2	1–0	2–2	—	2–0
PAEEK	3–1	0–0	1–2	0–0	2–1	0–0	3–3	—

Updated to match(es) played on 25 April 2026. Source: CFA
Legend: Blue = home team win; Yellow = draw; Red = away team win.
For upcoming matches, an "a" indicates there is an article about the rivalry between the two participants.

== Relegation Round ==
The bottom eight teams from the regular season face each other twice more (once at home and once away), with the bottom three teams being relegated to the Cypriot Third Division. Results from the regular season were carried over into this round.

=== League table ===
Pos	Team	Pld	W	D	L	GF	GA	GD	Pts	Relegation
9	Chalkanoras Idaliou	14	8	4	2	24	11	+13	45	
10	Spartakos Kitiou	14	7	2	5	27	16	+11	39	
11	APEA Akrotiri	14	6	3	5	19	15	+4	39	
12	Digenis Akritas Morphou	14	5	4	5	22	20	+2	39	
13	Iraklis Gerolakkou	14	6	6	2	16	11	+5	37	
14	Ethnikos Latsion (R)	14	5	3	6	17	18	−1	30	Relegation to the Cypriot Third Division
15	AEZ Zakakiou (R)	14	4	4	6	21	29	−8	26	Relegation to the Cypriot Third Division
16	Achyronas-Onisilos (R)	14	0	4	10	12	38	−26	8	Relegation to the Cypriot Third Division

Updated to match(es) played on 25 April 2026. Source: CFA (in Greek)
Rules for classification: 1) Points; 2) Head-to-head points; 3) Head-to-head goal difference; 4) Head-to-head goals scored; 5) Head-to-head away goals scored (only if two teams); 6) Goal difference; 7) Goals scored; 8) Play-off (only if deciding championship round, relegation round or relegation).
(R) Relegated

=== Results ===
Home \ Away	ACH	AEZ	APE	CHA	DIG	ETH	IRA	SPA
Achyronas-Onisilos	—	0–3	1–1	0–3	0–4	1–1	1–1	0–2
AEZ Zakakiou	4–2	—	1–1	2–4	2–3	1–0	0–0	2–4
APEA Akrotiri	3–1	2–3	—	0–1	1–0	2–1	0–1	4–0
Chalkanoras Idaliou	3–0	3–0	3–1	—	2–2	2–3	0–0	1–0
Digenis Akritas Morphou	5–1	1–1	1–1	0–0	—	2–0	1–0	1–5
Ethnikos Latsion	3–1	1–1	0–1	3–1	2–1	—	0–0	0–3
Iraklis Gerolakkou	3–2	4–1	0–2	0–0	2–1	2–1	—	2–1
Spartakos Kitiou	2–2	4–0	2–0	0–1	3–0	0–2	1–1	—

Updated to match(es) played on 25 April 2026. Source: CFA
Legend: Blue = home team win; Yellow = draw; Red = away team win.
For upcoming matches, an "a" indicates there is an article about the rivalry between the two participants.
