= Agop Donabidian =

Association football player and coach (born 1981)

Personal information
- Full name: Agop Misak Donabidian
- Date of birth: 28 October 1981 (age 45)
- Place of birth: Qamishli, Syria
- Height: 1.69 m (5 ft 7 in)
- Position: Defender

Team information
- Current team: Athletico (coach)

Senior career*
Years	Team	Apps	(Gls)
2000–2006	Homenetmen Beirut		(13)
2006	Lokomotiv Vitebsk	4	(0)
2006–2010	Nejmeh		(1)
2010–2013	Homenetmen Beirut		
2013–2015	Salam Zgharta	37	(0)
2015–2018	Homenetmen Beirut		

International career
2002	Lebanon U23		
2000–2003	Lebanon	18	(0)

Managerial career
- 2018–: Athletico (coach)
- * Club domestic league appearances and goals

Agop Misak Donabidian (Arabic: اكوب ميساك دونابيديان; born 28 October 1981) is a football coach and former player who is a coach at Lebanese football academy Athletico. Born in Syria, he played for the Lebanon national team.

== Early life ==
Donabidian was born in Qamishli, Syria, to Lebanese parents of Armenian descent.

== Club career ==
On 5 December 2006, Donabidian joined Nejmeh.

Donabidian, who was captain of Salam Zgharta, was released by his club in summer 2015. On 5 October 2015, he signed for Homenetmen Beirut.

== International career ==
Donabidian played for the Lebanon national team at the 2000 WAFF Championship, 2002 FIFA World Cup qualifiers, and 2004 AFC Asian Cup qualifiers.

== Managerial career ==
Donabidian became a coach at the Athletico academy in 2018.

== Honours ==
Homenetmen

- Lebanese Second Division: 2002–03

Nejmeh

- Lebanese Premier League: 2008–09
- Lebanese Super Cup: 2009

Salam Zgharta

- Lebanese FA Cup: 2013–14

Individual

- Lebanese Premier League Best Young Player: 1999–2000

== See also ==
- List of Lebanon international footballers born outside Lebanon
