= Majed Osman =

Lebanese footballer (born 1994)

- Osman with Lebanon in 2024

Personal information
- Full name: Majed Sobhi Osman
- Date of birth: 9 June 1994 (age 32)
- Place of birth: Hammersmith, England
- Height: 6 ft 0 in (1.82 m)
- Positions: Winger; attacking midfielder

Team information
- Current team: Ansar
- Number: 66

Youth career
- 2005–2012: Brentford FC CST
- 2017–2018: Morecambe

College career
| Years | Team | Apps | (Gls) |
| 2012–2013 | WV Mountaineers | 27 | (8) |
| 2014–2016 | Xavier Musketeers | 37 | (4) |

Senior career*
| Years | Team | Apps | (Gls) |
| 2015 | FC Tucson | 4 | (1) |
| 2017 | Rushall Olympic | | |
| 2017–2018 | Airbus UK Broughton | | |
| 2018–2019 | Corinthian-Casuals | 16 | (4) |
| 2019–2020 | Safa | 3 | (0) |
| 2020–2021 | Al-Ramtha | 26 | (3) |
| 2021–2022 | Ansar | 17 | (1) |
| 2022–2024 | Dewa United | 63 | (11) |
| 2024–2025 | Persik Kediri | 30 | (3) |
| 2025– | Ansar | 20 | (1) |

International career^{‡}
| 2021–2025 | Lebanon | 15 | (2) |
- * Club domestic league appearances and goals as of 10:17, 3 August 2026 (UTC) ‡ National team caps and goals as of 14 October 2025

Majed Sobhi Osman (/ˈmɑːdʒɪd ɒzˈmɛn/ mah-jid oz-MEN; Arabic: ماجد صبحي عثمان, Lebanese Arabic pronunciation: ['meːʒid ʕos'meːn]; born 9 June 1994) is a professional footballer who plays as a winger or attacking midfielder for Lebanese Premier League club Ansar. Born in England, he has played for the Lebanon national team.

After playing in the lower divisions of English and American football, Osman joined Safa in Lebanese Premier League in summer 2019. Following the cancellation of the 2019–20 season, Osman moved to Jordan at Al-Ramtha in February 2020, helping them to a third-place finish in his first season. He returned to Lebanon in summer 2021, signing for reigning champions Ansar, before moving to Indonesia where he played for Dewa United and Persik Kediri.

== Early life ==
Osman was born in Hammersmith, Greater London, England, to Lebanese father Sobhi and English mother Linda. He attended the International School of London, while playing for the Brentford FC Community Sports Trust (Brentford FC CST). Osman has a brother, and is a practicing Muslim.

== Youth and college career ==
Osman began his youth career at the Brentford FC CST when he was about 12 years old, before moving to the United States in 2012, where he played college football for West Virginia Mountaineers. He scored three goals in 12 games in 2012, and five goals in 15 games the next season. Osman was part of the All-Mid-American Conference (MAC) First Team in 2013.

In 2014 Osman moved to Xavier Musketeers, Xavier University's varsity sports team. However, due to an injury, he was ruled out of the 2014 season. He debuted in the 2015 season, scoring two goals in 18 games; in 2016 he scored two goals in 19 games. In summer 2017, Osman returned to England, joining Morecambe's under-23 team.

== Club career ==
=== Early career ===
Osman began his senior career in the United States in 2015 at USL Premier Development League (PDL) club FC Tucson, scoring on his debut on 16 May 2015. He finished the 2015 season with one goal in four appearances. While training for Morecambe, on 25 September 2017 Osman joined Northern Premier League (NPL) Premier Division club Rushall Olympic. On 11 November 2017, he moved to Airbus UK Broughton in the Cymru Alliance.

=== Corinthian-Casuals ===
In 2018, Osman moved to Isthmian League side Corinthian-Casuals. He scored his first league goal on 2 March 2019, in a 2–2 draw against Haringey Borough. On 13 April 2019, Osman scored a brace against Wingate & Finchley, helping his side win 3–1. Osman scored a total of four goals in 16 league games during the 2018–19 season.

=== Safa ===
Osman with Safa in 2019

On 22 July 2019, Osman joined Lebanese Premier League side Safa. He featured for the club in all three 2019–20 league games to date, before the season was cancelled due to the ongoing economic crisis in Lebanon and the impending arrival of the coronavirus pandemic.

=== Al-Ramtha ===
On 26 February 2020, Osman moved to Jordanian Pro League club Al-Ramtha on a one-and-a-half-year contract. He made his debut in the league on 6 March 2020, against defending champions Al-Faisaly in a 0–0 draw away from home. Osman scored his first goal against Al-Wehdat in the league on 10 September 2020, in a 1–0 victory. His first league assist came on 19 September, in a 2–1 home win against Shabab Al-Ordon. Osman played 21 league games during the 2020 season, missing one game for being positive to COVID-19; he helped Al-Ramtha finish in third place, and had his contract extended a further six months.

On 10 May 2021, Osman scored a brace in the 2021 Jordanian Pro League through two long-range efforts, helping Al-Ramtha beat Al-Hussein 5–1 at home. Osman refused to be called up for Al-Ramtha's game against Al-Baqa'a on 26 June, following financial disagreements with the club. He left for Lebanon the following day.

=== Ansar ===
On 20 July 2021, Lebanese Premier League reigning-champions Ansar announced the signing of Osman. He played 17 league games for Ansar, scoring once on 29 April 2022, in a 1–1 draw against Ahed. Osman also appeared in the 2022 AFC Cup, playing all three group-stage games.

=== Dewa United ===
On 13 July 2022, Osman joined Dewa United of the Indonesian Liga 1. He debuted on 7 August against Persita, losing 1–0 away from home. Osman scored and assisted both of Dewa United's goals against PSIS Semarang on 29 August; despite being down to 10 men, Dewa United won 2–1. He finished the 2022–23 season with seven goals and three assists. On 9 June 2023, Dewa United renewed Osman's contract a further year.

=== Persik Kediri ===
On 16 July 2024, Osman moved to fellow Liga 1 team Persik Kediri. On 12 June 2025, Osman officially left Persik Kediri.

=== Return to Ansar ===
Osman returned to Ansar in August 2025, ahead of the 2025–26 season.

== International career ==
Eligible to represent Lebanon internationally through his father, Osman was first called up to the national team for a training camp in the United Arab Emirates, to be held between 9 and 17 November 2020. However, as he tested positive for COVID-19, he was unable to join the camp. Osman made his debut on 29 March 2021, coming on as an 84th-minute substitute for Bassel Jradi in a 1–1 friendly draw against Kuwait. He scored his first goal on 21 November 2023, in a 1–1 draw against Bangladesh in the 2026 FIFA World Cup qualification.

== Career statistics ==
=== International ===
As of match played 14 October 2025

Appearances and goals by national team and year
| National team | Year | Apps | Goals |
|---|---|---|---|
| Lebanon | 2021 | 3 | 0 |
| Lebanon | 2022 | 0 | 0 |
| Lebanon | 2023 | 3 | 1 |
| Lebanon | 2024 | 4 | 0 |
| Lebanon | 2025 | 5 | 1 |
| Total | | 15 | 2 |

Scores and results list Lebanon's goal tally first, score column indicates score after each Osman goal.

List of international goals scored by Majed Osman
| No. | Date | Venue | Opponent | Score | Result | Competition |
|---|---|---|---|---|---|---|
| 1 | 21 November 2023 | Bashundhara Kings Arena, Dhaka, Bangladesh | Bangladesh | 1–0 | 1–1 | 2026 FIFA World Cup qualification |
| 2 | 20 March 2025 | Al-Khor SC Stadium, Al Khor, Qatar | Timor-Leste | 1–0 | 4–0 | Friendly |

== Honours ==
Al-Ramtha

- Jordanian Pro League: 2021

Ansar

- Lebanese Premier League: 2025–26
- Lebanese Super Cup: 2021
- Lebanese FA Cup runner-up: 2021–22

Individual

- All-MAC First Team: 2013

== See also ==
- List of Lebanon international footballers born outside Lebanon
