= Krikor Alozian =

Lebanese footballer

Personal information
- Full name: Krikor Agob Alozian
- Date of birth: 24 April 1979 (age 47)
- Place of birth: Aleppo, Syria
- Position: Midfielder

Senior career*
Years	Team	Apps	(Gls)
1999–2002	Homenetmen Beirut		
2002–2006	Tripoli (Note: Olympic Beirut changed its name to AC Tripoli in 2005.)		
2006–2015	Sagesse		

International career
1998–2004	Lebanon	13	(0)
- * Club domestic league appearances and goals

Krikor Agob Alozian (Arabic: كريكور اكوب ألوزيان; born 24 April 1979) is a former professional footballer who played as a midfielder. Born in Syria, he played for the Lebanon national team.

== Club career ==
Alozian spent most of his career at Sagesse, having previously played for Homenetmen Beirut and Tripoli.

== International career ==
Alozian played for the Lebanon national team from 1999 to 2004.

== See also ==
- List of Lebanon international footballers born outside Lebanon
