= Newton (footballer, born 1976) =

Footballer (born 1976)

Personal information
- Full name: Newton Santos de Oliveira
- Date of birth: 24 July 1976 (age 50)
- Place of birth: Rio de Janeiro, Brazil
- Position: Striker

Senior career*
Years	Team	Apps	(Gls)
2000	Portuguesa		
2000–2001	Ansar		
2001–2002	Portuguesa		
2002–2003	Al-Wehda		
2003	CFZ do Rio		
2004–2006	Akhaa Ahli Aley		
2006	Portuguesa		
2006–2007	Penang FA		
2007	Portuguesa		

International career
2000–2001	Lebanon	7	(1)
- * Club domestic league appearances and goals

Newton Santos de Oliveira (born 24 July 1976), or simply Newton (Arabic: نيوتن), is a former footballer who played as a striker. Born in Brazil, he played for the Lebanon national team at the 2000 AFC Asian Cup.

== Club career ==
Newton was born in Rio de Janeiro, the second largest city of Brazil.

According to the annual reports of international transfers and returns to Brazil made by the Brazilian Football Confederation, he was transferred from Associação Atlética Portuguesa (RJ) to the Saudi Arabian side Al-Wahda on 26 December 2002; from CFZ do Rio to Al-Akhaa Al-Ahli on 25 October 2004; from Al-Akhaa Al-Ahli to Associação Atlética Portuguesa (RJ) on 20 March 2006; from Associação Atlética Portuguesa (RJ) to the Malaysian team Penang FA on 10 April 2006 and from Penang FA to Associação Atlética Portuguesa (RJ) on 28 March 2007.

== International career ==
Born in Brazil, Newton is of Lebanese descent; he represented the Lebanon national football team at the 2000 AFC Asian Cup.

== Career statistics ==
=== International ===
Appearances and goals by national team and year
National team	Year	Apps	Goals
Lebanon	2000	5	1
Lebanon	2001	2	0
Total		7	1

Scores and results list Lebanon's goal tally first, score column indicates score after each Newton goal.

List of international goals scored by Newton
No.	Date	Venue	Opponent	Score	Result	Competition
1	10 September 2000	Camille Chamoun Sports City Stadium, Beirut, Lebanon	United Arab Emirates	1–?	2–2	Friendly

== See also ==
- List of Lebanon international footballers born outside Lebanon
