= List of Lebanon international footballers born outside Lebanon =

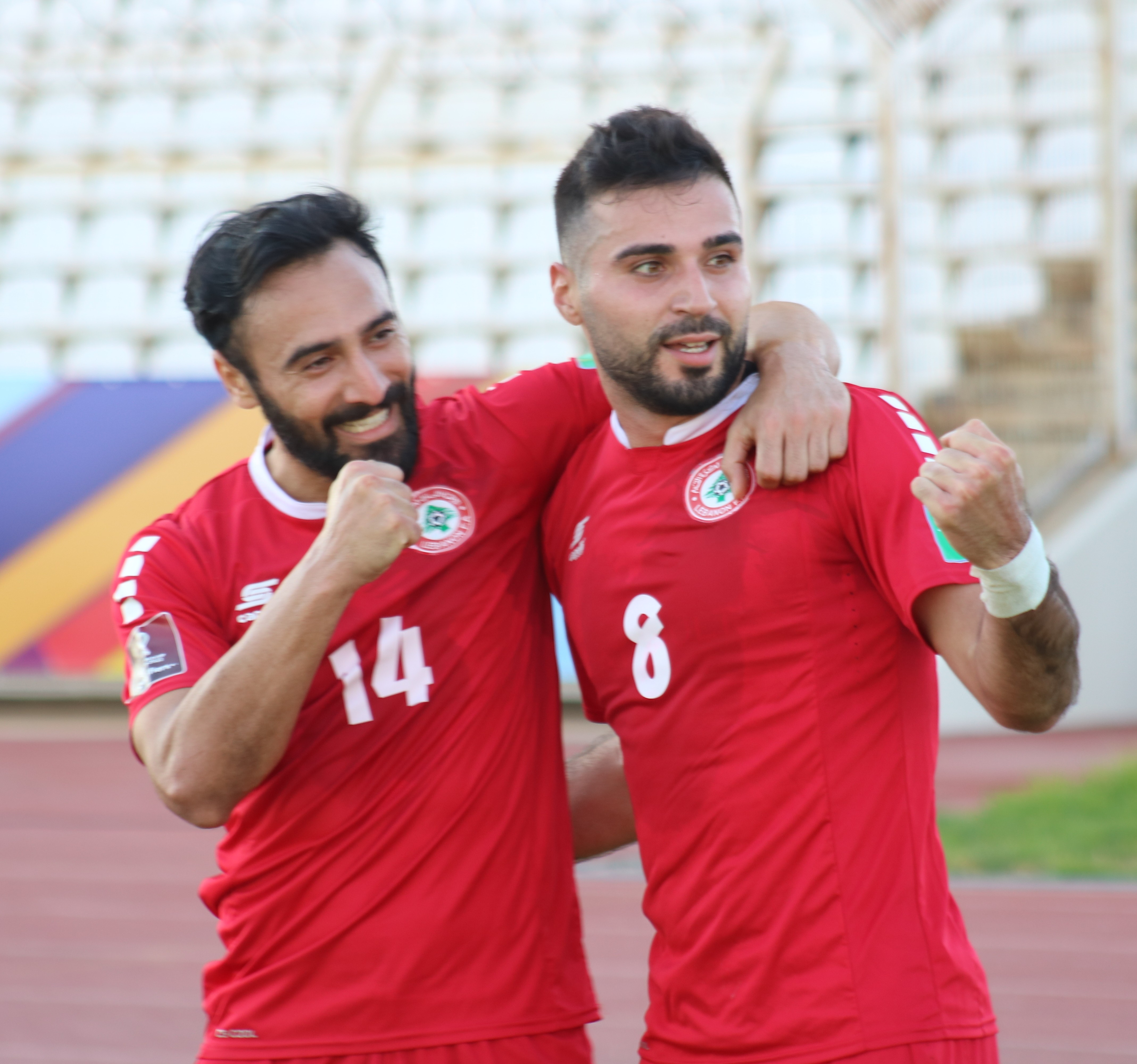
Nader Matar (left) and Soony Saad (right), born in the Ivory Coast and the United States respectively, celebrating a goal for Lebanon in 2021

The Lebanon national football team has used footballers born outside Lebanon throughout its history with varying success. As a result of the dominance of clubs founded by the Armenian diaspora in Lebanon, between the 1940s and 1960s the national team heavily featured Lebanese players of Armenian origin. The established presence of Armenians in the team led the Lebanese Football Association (LFA) to naturalise several Armenian players born in Armenia during the 1990s to play internationally for Lebanon. Most notably, Vardan Ghazaryan was the national team's all-time top goalscorer until 2023.

In preparation for the 2000 AFC Asian Cup, the LFA naturalised five Brazilian-born players of Lebanese descent; their presence was generally not well received, as it was felt that they did not improve the level of the team, and Lebanon were eliminated in the first round without registering a win. At the 2019 Asian Cup, nine of the 23 called-up players were born outside Lebanon; contrary to 2000, their inclusion was seen positively. Diaspora recruitment continued through the 2023 Asian Cup, where 12 players were foreign-born.

== History ==
=== Armenians in Lebanon ===
Armenian-born player Vardan Ghazaryan was Lebanon's all-time leading goalscorer until 2023.

Following the Armenian genocide in 1915, many Armenians emigrated to Lebanon; as of 2021, Lebanon was home to the eighth-largest Armenian diaspora in the world. Between the 1940s and 1960s, clubs founded by the Armenian diaspora, such as Homenetmen and Homenmen, dominated Lebanese domestic football; during this period many Lebanese players of Armenian origin played for the Lebanon national team.

The large presence of Armenians in Lebanon pushed the Lebanese Football Association (LFA) to naturalise Armenian players born outside Lebanon. In 1993, the LFA naturalised Babken Melikyan via a presidential decree, ratified by Prime Minister Rafic Hariri, in order to play for the Lebanon national team at the 1994 FIFA World Cup qualification. Jamal Taha, born in Egypt to an Egyptian father and Lebanese mother, was also naturalised alongside Melikyan. Melikyan's example set the trend for other Armenian players to take advantage of the decree to gain citizenship and play for Lebanon during the 1990s, such as Gurgen Engibaryan, Gevorg Karapetyan, and Armen Igitbashyan. The most impactful Armenian to play for the national team was Vardan Ghazaryan; he obtained Lebanese citizenship through naturalisation in 1994, and was the national team's all-time top goalscorer until 2023.

After Homenetmen and Homenmen were relegated to the lower divisions in the early 2000s, the Armenian presence in the national team fell. By the mid-2000s, Armenian representation in the national team had ceased, with Agop Donabidian among the last players of Armenian origin to represent "the Cedars".

=== 2000 Asian Cup ===
With over six million people worldwide having Lebanese descent, compared to the four million Lebanese living in Lebanon, the LFA sought to take advantage of the sizeable Lebanese diaspora to improve football in Lebanon. Despite the positive impact of the Lebanese diaspora in various sports – such as basketball, tennis, and rugby – football did not initially benefit in the same way.

In Lebanon's first participation at the AFC Asian Cup in 2000, which they hosted, they called up five Brazilian players of Lebanese heritage: Luís Fernandes, Gilberto, Jadir Morgenstern, Marcílio, and Newton. According to Jamal Taha, Lebanon's captain at the tournament, there was no communication between the local players and the naturalised players due to the language barrier. Lebanon were eventually knocked out in the first round without winning a single match. The general sentiment regarding the Brazilian players was that they did not improve the level of the national team, and were in fact "harmful" due to the lack of integration with the other players.

=== 2019 and 2023 Asian Cups ===
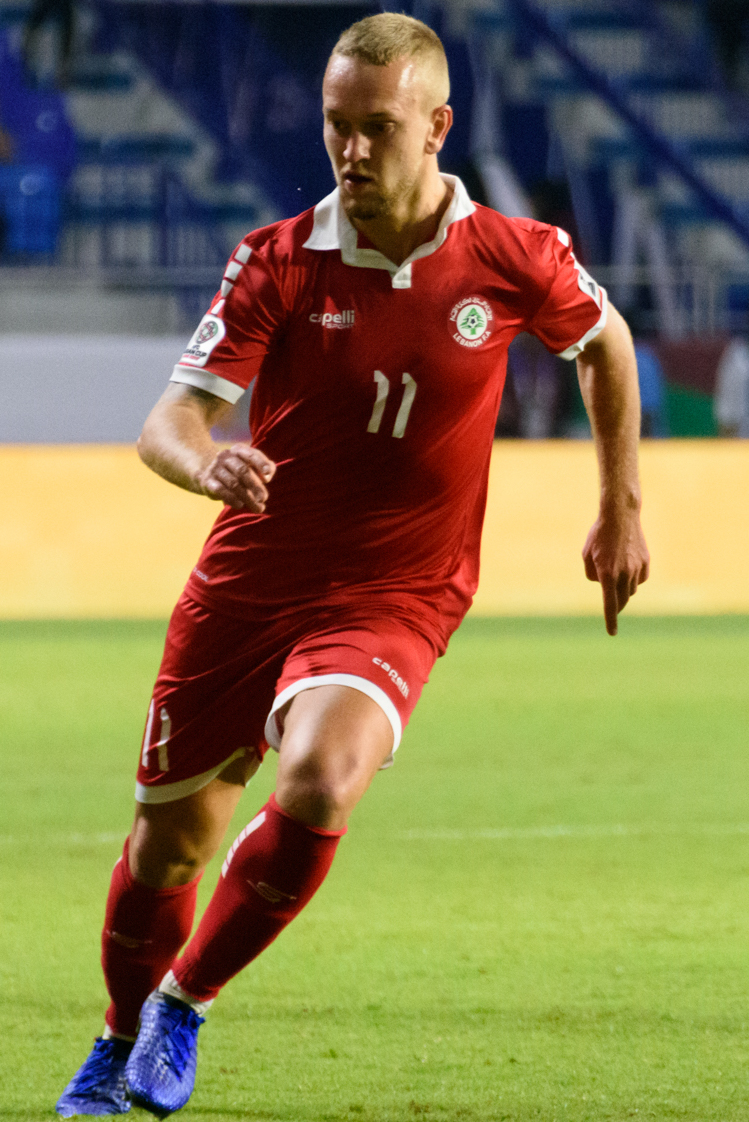
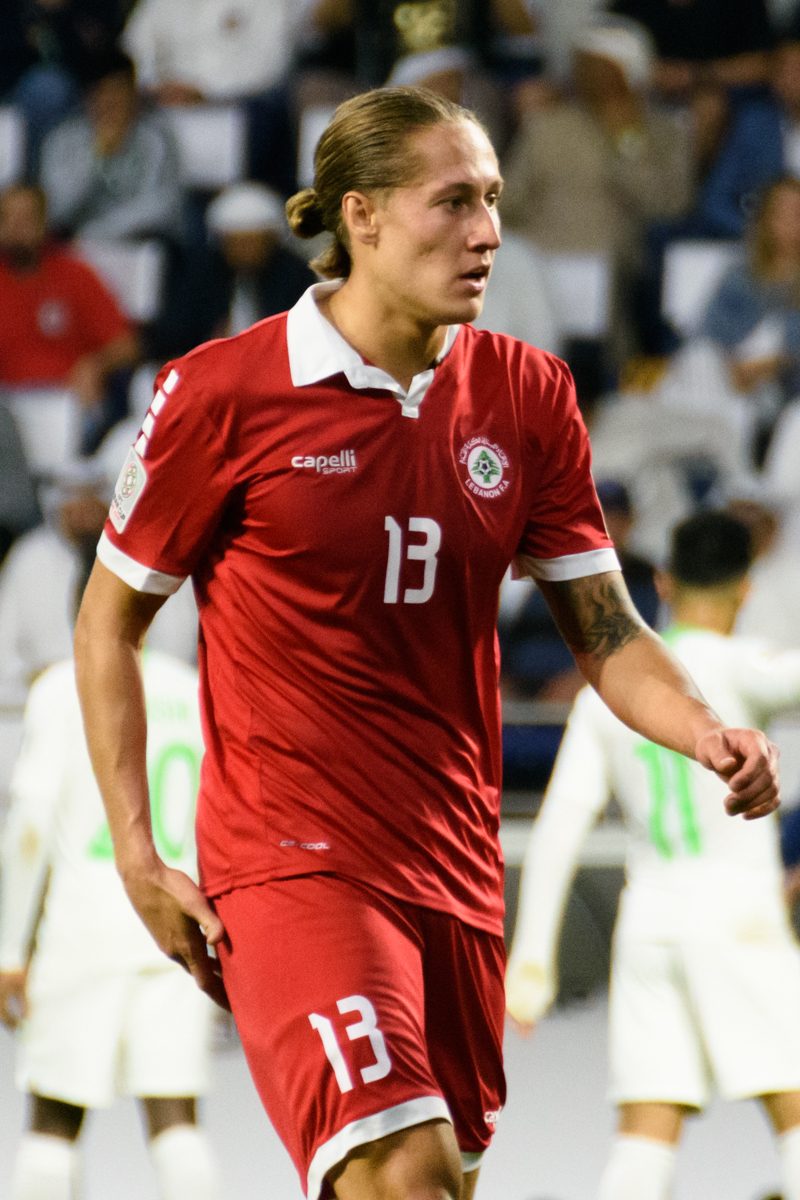
Swedish-born brothers Alexander Michel Melki (left) and Felix Michel Melki (right) played for Lebanon at the 2019 Asian Cup.

At the 2019 Asian Cup, Lebanon's second participation, nine of the 23 players called up were born outside Lebanon. Compared to the 2000 Asian Cup, the addition of foreign-born players of Lebanese descent was well received: Hassan Maatouk, captain of the national team, stated: "It's a good thing for us that we have some players from outside the country that can come and help us." Several players born outside Lebanon communicated with their teammates in English.

Lebanon continued the trend of calling up players born abroad during the 2022 FIFA World Cup qualification campaign, in which the team reached the final round of qualifying for the second time. Wael Chehayeb of the LFA stated: "[People with Lebanese origins] give us more options when looking for players as we don't have a big population, and some of them have a European football education which is good for us." At the 2023 Asian Cup, Lebanon continued to call up foreign-born players, with 12 of the 26 players in the squad born outside Lebanon.

== Nationality and eligibility ==
Under FIFA eligibility rules, a player must hold the nationality of the association they represent. Diaspora recruitment is facilitated by Lebanon's nationality law, which permits dual citizenship and grants nationality through paternal descent, extending to a paternal grandfather.

However, under Decree No. 15 of 1925, children of Lebanese fathers automatically acquire Lebanese nationality, while children of Lebanese mothers and foreign fathers do not have the same right. In 2026, Lebanese football scout Ahmmed Choker said that more than 20 footballers with Lebanese maternal heritage had expressed interest in representing Lebanon but were unable to do so because they could not obtain citizenship through their mothers. Even among eligible players, slow government processing of citizenship paperwork has at times prevented the LFA from registering recruits with FIFA in time for major tournaments, including the 2023 Asian Cup.

== List of players ==
This is a list of football players who represented the Lebanon national football team in international football and were born outside Lebanon.

The following players:

1. have played at least one game for the full (senior male) Lebanon national team; and
2. were born outside Lebanon.

This list includes players who have dual citizenship with Lebanon and/or have become naturalised Lebanese citizens. The players are ordered per modern-day country of birth; if the country at the time of birth differs from the current, this is indicated with a footnote.

As of match played 17 November 2026

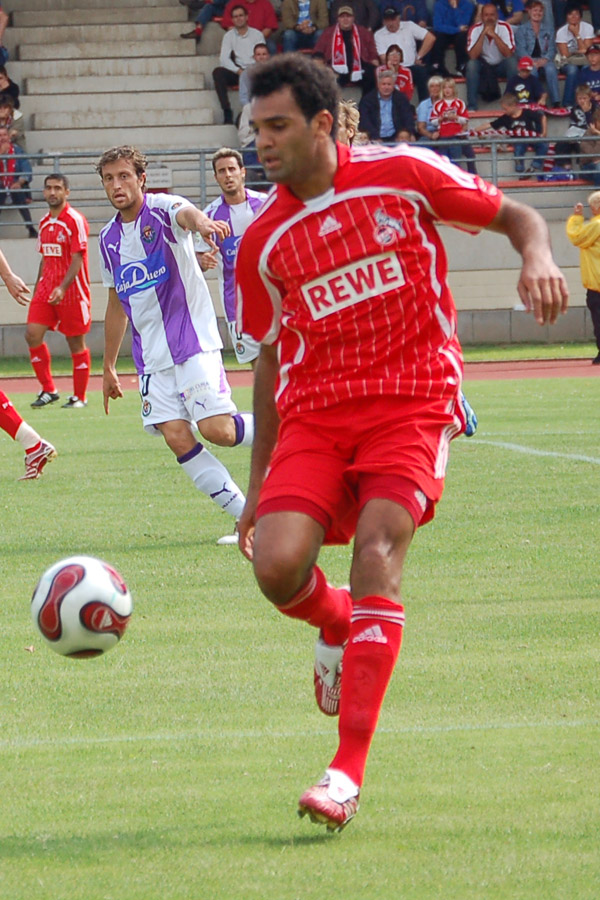
Roda Antar, born in Sierra Leone, is Lebanon's most-capped foreign-born player with 82 caps.

List of players
Country of birth	Player	Caps	Goals	Period
Armenia (Note: At the time part of the Soviet Union)	Gurgen Engibaryan	50	1	1995–2001
Armenia	Vardan Ghazaryan	66	21	1995–2001
Armenia	Armen Igitbashyan	13	0	1995–1996
Armenia	Gevorg Karapetyan	41	2	1996–1999
Armenia	Babken Melikyan	36	3	1993–1997
Australia	Austin Ayoubi	1	0	2026–present
Australia	Buddy Farah	20	1	2000–2004
Australia	Yahya El Hindi	4	0	2019–2023
Australia	Khoder Kaddour	5	0	2025–present
Australia	Jackson Khoury	1	0	2024
Australia	Ramy Najjarine	1	0	2025
Australia	Michael Reda	8	0	2000
Brazil	Luís Fernandes	10	1	2000–2004
Brazil	Gilberto	11	7	2000–2001
Brazil	João Gabriel Maklouf	4	0	2026–present
Brazil	Marcílio	15	2	2000–2003
Brazil	Jadir Morgenstern	17	2	2000–2001
Brazil	Newton	5	0	2000–2001
Brazil	Salomão Salha	6	0	2001
Bulgaria	Samir Ayass	13	1	2017–2019
Canada	Gabriel Bitar	16	0	2022–present
Colombia	Samy Merheg	14	7	2024–present
Denmark	Bassel Jradi	26	3	2015–2024
Egypt	Jamal Taha	71	12	1993–2000
England	Jed Chouman	3	0	2014
England	Hady Ghandour	1	0	2021
England	Majed Osman	15	2	2021–present
France	Alexis Khazzaka	2	0	2013
Germany	Omar Chaaban	25	2	2017–present
Germany	Husseyn Chakroun	10	5	2024–present
Germany	Karim Darwich	34	3	2020–present
Germany	Malek Fakhro	12	5	2024–present
Germany	Hilal El-Helwe	53	9	2015–2024
Germany	Reda Khadra	2	0	2026–present
Germany	Khaled Mohssen	1	0	2020
Germany	Hassan Oumari	2	0	2016
Germany	Joan Oumari	36	4	2013–2022
Iraq	Haitham Zein	50	17	1997–2004
Ivory Coast	Hussein El Dor	5	0	2021–2022
Ivory Coast	Wehbi Fawaz	4	0	2026–present
Ivory Coast	Mehdi Khalil	58	0	2013–present
Ivory Coast	Mahmoud Kojok	2	0	2016
Ivory Coast	Nader Matar	71	4	2012–2024
Kuwait	Ali Alaaeddine	1	0	2019
Kuwait	Hassan Daher	9	0	2010–2013
Kuwait	Ali Nasseredine	22	9	2003–2006
Kuwait	Ziad Al Samad	47	0	1999–2012
Liberia	Fouad Hijazi	49	1	1993–2003
Liberia	Wael Nazha	32	8	1993–1998
Mexico	Pedro Budib	4	2	2025–present
Mexico	Daniel Kuri	16	0	2022–2025
Nigeria	Hassan El Mohamad	21	0	2012–2017
Norway	Adnan Haidar	37	1	2012–2019
Saudi Arabia	Ahmad El Choum	19	0	2003–2008
Saudi Arabia	Sami El Choum	4	0	2003
Saudi Arabia	Ahmad El Khodor	4	0	2008–2010
Saudi Arabia	Ahmad El Naamani	33	0	1997–2006
Sierra Leone	Tarek El Ali	5	2	2007–2011
Sierra Leone	Faisal Antar	53	5	1998–2007
Sierra Leone	Roda Antar	82	20	1998–2016
Sierra Leone	Walid Shour	41	1	2021–present
Sweden	Mouhammed-Ali Dhaini	26	0	2020–2024
Sweden	George Felix Melki	33	1	2018–2024
Sweden	Robert Alexander Melki	29	0	2018–2024
Sweden	Mohamed Ramadan	1	0	2015
Sweden	Leonardo Shahin	9	0	2024–present
Switzerland	Jad Smaira	5	0	2024–present
Syria	Krikor Alozian	13	0	1998–2004
Syria	Agop Donabidian	15	0	2000–2003
Syria	Vatche Sarkissian	2	0	1985
Ukraine	Chadi Harb	3	0	2014
United States	Soony Saad	38	7	2013–2024
Venezuela	Jihad Ayoub	26	2	2021–present
Venezuela	Rabie El Kakhi	4	0	2011–2013

== List of countries ==
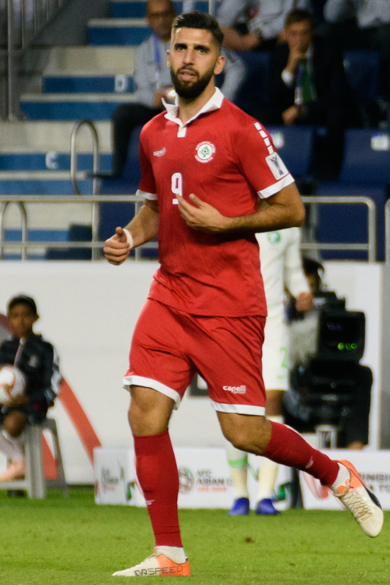
Germany has produced the most foreign-born Lebanese internationals (nine), led by Hilal El-Helwe with 53 caps.

List of countries
Country of birth	Total	Most-capped player (caps)
Germany	9	Hilal El-Helwe (53)
Australia	7	Buddy Farah (20)
Brazil	7	Jadir Morgenstern (17)
Armenia	5	Vardan Ghazaryan (66)
Ivory Coast	5	Nader Matar (71)
Sweden	5	George Felix Melki (33)
Kuwait	4	Ziad Al Samad (47)
Saudi Arabia	4	Ahmad El Naamani (33)
Sierra Leone	4	Roda Antar (82)
England	3	Majed Osman (15)
Syria	3	Agop Donabidian (15)
Liberia	2	Fouad Hijazi (49)
Mexico	2	Daniel Kuri (16)
Venezuela	2	Jihad Ayoub (26)
Bulgaria	1	Samir Ayass (13)
Canada	1	Gabriel Bitar (16)
Colombia	1	Samy Merheg (14)
Denmark	1	Bassel Jradi (26)
Egypt	1	Jamal Taha (71)
France	1	Alexis Khazzaka (2)
Iraq	1	Haitham Zein (50)
Nigeria	1	Hassan El Mohamad (21)
Norway	1	Adnan Haidar (37)
Switzerland	1	Jad Smaira (5)
Ukraine	1	Chadi Harb (3)
United States	1	Soony Saad (38)

== See also ==
- Lebanese diaspora
- Lists of Lebanese diaspora
- List of Lebanon international footballers
- List of Lebanon women's international footballers
