= Ahmad El Naamani =

Lebanese footballer

Personal information
- Full name: Ahmad Youssef El Naamani
- Date of birth: 12 October 1979 (age 47)
- Place of birth: Mecca, Saudi Arabia
- Height: 1.85 m (6 ft 1 in)
- Position: Defender

Senior career*
Years	Team	Apps	(Gls)
1999–2005	Safa		(18)
2005–2011	Nejmeh		(4)
2011–2013	Akhaa Ahli Aley	24	(4)
Total			(26)

International career
2002	Lebanon U23		
1997–2006	Lebanon	52	(0)
- * Club domestic league appearances and goals

Ahmad Youssef El Naamani (Arabic: أحمد يوسف النعماني; born 12 October 1979) is a former footballer who played as a defender. Born in Saudi Arabia, he played for the Lebanese national team during the 2000 AFC Asian Cup.

== Club career ==
El Naamani joined Nejmeh on 9 September 2005.

== See also ==
- List of Lebanese people in Saudi Arabia
- List of Lebanon international footballers born outside Lebanon
