= 2024–25 Cypriot Second Division =

Cypriot Second Division
- Season: 2024–25
- Dates: 13 September 2024 – 26 April 2025
- Champions: Krasava Ypsonas (1st title)
- Runner up: Olympiakos Nicosia
- Promoted: Krasava Ypsonas; Akritas Chlorakas; Olympiakos Nicosia
- Relegated: Anagennisi Deryneia; Othellos Athienou; Peyia 2014
- Matches: 232
- Goals: 452 (1.95 per match)
- Top goalscorer: Christos Iordanidis; Dimitrios Grammenos (17 goals each)
- Biggest home win: Othellos Athienou 8–0 Peyia 2014 (12 April 2025)
- Biggest away win: Peyia 2014 2014 0–7 Chalkanoras Idaliou (26 April 2025)
- Highest scoring: Spartakos Kitiou 4–5 Achyronas-Onisilos FC (28 September 2024)
- Longest unbeaten run: Krasava Ypsonas (9 matches)
- Longest winless run: Peyia 2014 (15 matches)
- Longest losing run: Peyia 2014 (8 matches)

The 2024–25 Cypriot Second Division was the 70th season of the Cypriot second-level football league. The campaign started on the 13th of September 2024 and concluded on the 26th of April 2025.

== Teams ==
The league consisted of sixteen teams; ten teams remaining from the previous season, three teams promoted from the Cypriot Third Division, and three teams relegated from the Cypriot First Division.

Teams promoted to 2024-25 Cypriot First Division

- Omonia Aradippou
- Omonia 29M
- Enosis Neon Paralimni

Teams relegated from 2023–24 Cypriot First Division

- Doxa Katokopias
- Othellos Athienou
- AEZ Zakakiou

Teams promoted from 2023–24 Cypriot Third Division

- Chalkanoras Idaliou
- Anagennisi Deryneia
- Spartakos Kitiou

Teams relegated to 2024-25 Cypriot Third Division

- ENAD Polis Chrysochous
- Ermis Aradippou
- Podosfairikos Omilos Xylotymbou 2006

== Stadia and locations ==
Locations of the 2024–25 Cypriot Second Division teams.

Note: Table lists clubs in alphabetical order.

Club	Location
Achyronas-Onisilos	Sotira
AEZ Zakakiou	Zakaki
Akritas Chlorakas	Chloraka
Anagennisi Deryneia	Deryneia
ASIL	Larnaca
Ayia Napa	Ayia Napa
Chalkanoras Idaliou	Dali
Digenis Akritas Morphou	Morphou
Doxa Katokopias	Katokopia
Krasava ENY Ypsonas	Ypsonas
MEAP Nisou	Nisou
Olympiakos Nicosia	Nicosia
Othellos Athienou	Athienou
PAEEK	Lakatamia
Peyia 2014	Pegeia
Spartakos Kitiou	Kiti

== Regular season ==
During the regular season, each team faced each other once (either at home or away). Afterwards, the table split into two groups, with the top eight teams entering the Promotion Round and the bottom eight teams entering the Relegation Round.

=== League table ===
Pos	Team	Pld	W	D	L	GF	GA	GD	Pts	Qualification
1	Krasava Ypsonas	15	11	2	2	24	8	+16	35	Qualification for the Promotion Round
2	Digenis Akritas Morphou	15	10	1	4	24	19	+5	31	Qualification for the Promotion Round
3	Akritas Chlorakas	15	8	3	4	24	14	+10	27	Qualification for the Promotion Round
4	Olympiakos Nicosia	15	7	5	3	22	8	+14	26	Qualification for the Promotion Round
5	AEZ Zakakiou	15	7	4	4	20	15	+5	25	Qualification for the Promotion Round
6	ASIL Lysi	15	7	4	4	19	15	+4	25	Qualification for the Promotion Round
7	Achyronas-Onisilos	15	8	0	7	25	26	−1	24	Qualification for the Promotion Round
8	PAEEK	15	6	6	3	22	17	+5	24	Qualification for the Promotion Round
9	Doxa Katokopias	15	7	3	5	19	15	+4	24	Qualification for the Relegation Round
10	Spartakos Kitiou	15	6	0	9	23	24	−1	18	Qualification for the Relegation Round
11	MEAP Nisou	15	5	2	8	20	22	−2	17	Qualification for the Relegation Round
12	Chalkanoras Idaliou	15	5	1	9	21	30	−9	16	Qualification for the Relegation Round
13	Ayia Napa	15	4	3	8	8	22	−14	15	Qualification for the Relegation Round
14	Anagennisi Deryneia	15	3	3	9	21	31	−10	12	Qualification for the Relegation Round
15	Othellos Athienou	15	3	2	10	14	25	−11	11	Qualification for the Relegation Round
16	Peyia 2014	15	2	3	10	10	25	−15	9	Qualification for the Relegation Round

Source: CFA
Rules for classification: 1) Points; 2) Head-to-head points; 3) Head-to-head goal difference; 4) Head-to-head goals scored; 5) Head-to-head away goals scored (only if two teams); 6) Goal difference; 7) Goals scored; 8) Play-off (only if deciding championship round, relegation round or relegation).

=== Results ===
Home \ Away	ACH	AEZ	AKR	ANA	ASI	AYI	CHA	DIG	DOX	KRA	MEA	OLY	OTH	PAE	PEY	SPA
Achyronas-Onisilos	—	2–1	0–1	3–2		0–1		2–4				2–1			1–0	
AEZ Zakakiou		—	0–2		1–1	2–0		3–2	1–1	2–3				0–0		1–0
Akritas Chlorakas			—		4–0	3–0	3–0			0–3	2–0			0–0		3–1
Anagennisi Deryneia		1–0	3–3	—		1–1		1–2	1–2					1–1	4–1	1–3
ASIL Lysi	3–1			3–0	—		0–1		0–0		2–0	0–2	1–0		2–0	
Ayia Napa					1–1	—	2–1			0–0	0–3		0–1	0–2		1–0
Chalkanoras Idaliou	2–1	1–2		3–2			—	3–2				0–1	2–1		3–3	
Digenis Akritas Morphou			1–0		1–2	2–1		—	1–0	1–4	2–1			1–0		1–0
Doxa Katokopias	1–2		2–0			0–1	2–0		—			0–0	3–1	2–4		
Krasava Ypsonas	1–0			1–0	1–2		3–1		2–0	—	3–1	0–0	1–0			
MEAP Nisou	2–0	2–3		1–4			3–2		0–1		—	3–0	1–1		2–0	
Olympiakos Nicosia		0–0	0–0	4–0		5–0		1–2				—		3–0	2–0	
Othellos Athienou	1–3	0–2	1–2	3–0				1–2				1–1	—		2–1	
PAEEK	2–3				2–2		3–1			1–0	1–1		2–0	—		3–2
Peyia 2014		0–2	3–1			1–0		0–0	0–1	0–1				1–1	—	0–3
Spartakos Kitiou	4–5				1–0		2–1		2–4	0–1	1–0	0–2	4–1			—

Updated to match(es) played on 8 January 2025. Source: CFA
Legend: Blue = home team win; Yellow = draw; Red = away team win.
For upcoming matches, an "a" indicates there is an article about the rivalry between the two participants.

== Promotion Round ==
The top eight teams from the regular season face each other twice more (once at home and once away), with the top three teams earning promotion to the Cypriot First Division. Results from the regular season were carried over into this round.

=== League table ===
Pos	Team	Pld	W	D	L	GF	GA	GD	Pts	Promotion
1	Krasava Ypsonas (C, P)	14	8	3	3	22	9	+13	62	Promotion to the Cypriot First Division
2	Olympiakos Nicosia (P)	14	10	1	3	24	11	+13	56	Promotion to the Cypriot First Division
3	Akritas Chlorakas (P)	14	9	0	5	24	15	+9	54	Promotion to the Cypriot First Division
4	AEZ Zakakiou	14	8	1	5	18	16	+2	50	
5	Digenis Akritas Morphou	14	5	3	6	27	26	+1	49	
6	ASIL Lysi	14	6	0	8	17	24	−7	43	
7	PAEEK	14	3	2	9	14	22	−8	35	
8	Achyronas-Onisilos	14	1	2	11	11	34	−23	29	

Source: CFA (in Greek)
Rules for classification: 1) Points; 2) Head-to-head points; 3) Head-to-head goal difference; 4) Head-to-head goals scored; 5) Head-to-head away goals scored (only if two teams); 6) Goal difference; 7) Goals scored; 8) Play-off (only if deciding championship round, relegation round or relegation).
(C) Champions; (P) Promoted

== Relegation Round ==
The bottom eight teams from the regular season face each other twice more (once at home and once away), with the bottom three teams being relegated to the Cypriot Third Division. Results from the regular season were carried over into this round.

=== League table ===
Pos	Team	Pld	W	D	L	GF	GA	GD	Pts	Relegation
9	Doxa Katokopias	14	5	1	8	26	24	+2	40	
10	Spartakos Kitiou	14	6	2	6	25	24	+1	38	
11	Ayia Napa	14	7	2	5	20	19	+1	38	
12	Chalkanoras Idaliou	14	6	3	5	29	21	+8	37	
13	MEAP Nisou	14	5	4	5	15	13	+2	36	
14	Anagennisi Deryneia (R)	14	7	3	4	25	19	+6	36	Relegation to the Cypriot Third Division
15	Othellos Athienou (R)	14	6	2	6	20	16	+4	31	Relegation to the Cypriot Third Division
16	Peyia 2014 (R)	14	5	1	8	11	35	−24	25	Relegation to the Cypriot Third Division

Source: CFA (in Greek)
Rules for classification: 1) Points; 2) Head-to-head points; 3) Head-to-head goal difference; 4) Head-to-head goals scored; 5) Head-to-head away goals scored (only if two teams); 6) Goal difference; 7) Goals scored; 8) Play-off (only if deciding championship round, relegation round or relegation).
(R) Relegated
