= Chadi Harb =

Lebanese footballer (born 1993)

Personal information
- Full name: Chadi Marwan Harb
- Date of birth: 23 March 1993 (age 33)
- Place of birth: Rohatyn, Ukraine
- Height: 1.71 m (5 ft 7 in)
- Position: Forward

Senior career*
Years	Team	Apps	(Gls)
2013–2016	Mabarra		
2016–2017	Shabab Arabi		
2017–2019	Sagesse		

International career
2014	Lebanon	3	(0)
- * Club domestic league appearances and goals

Chadi Marwan Harb (Arabic: شادي مروان حرب; born 23 March 1993) is a former footballer who played as a forward. Born in Ukraine, he played for the Lebanon national team.

== International career ==
Harb was first called up to the Lebanon national team in October 2014, as part of a mixed squad of senior and Olympic players for friendly matches against Qatar and Saudi Arabia. He played for Lebanon in three friendly games in 2014, against Qatar, Saudi Arabia, and the United Arab Emirates.

== Personal life ==
Harb's brother, Daniel, is also a footballer.

== See also ==
- List of Lebanon international footballers born outside Lebanon
