= Mahmoud Kojok (footballer, born 1990) =

Lebanese footballer (born 1990)

Personal information
- Full name: Mahmoud Ahmad Kojok
- Date of birth: 29 April 1990 (age 36)
- Place of birth: Abidjan, Ivory Coast
- Height: 1.80 m (5 ft 11 in)
- Positions: Midfielder; full-back

Senior career*
Years	Team	Apps	(Gls)
2011–2014	Ansar	20	(2)
2013–2014	→ Safa (loan)	9	(0)
2014–2018	Racing Beirut	86	(2)
2021–2022	Sporting	0	(0)
Total		115	(4)

International career
2016	Lebanon	2	(0)
- * Club domestic league appearances and goals

Mahmoud Ahmad Kojok (Arabic: محمود أحمد كجك; born 29 April 1990) is a former footballer who played as a midfielder or full-back. Born in the Ivory Coast, he played for the Lebanon national team.

== Club career ==
Kojok joined Safa on a one-year loan from Ansar on 18 September 2013. On 14 August 2014, Kojok moved to Racing Beirut. He returned from retirement in summer 2021, signing for newly promoted Sporting.

== International career ==
Kojok played for Lebanon in two friendlies in 2016, against Bahrain and Uzbekistan.

== Honours ==
Ansar

- Lebanese FA Cup: 2011–12
- Lebanese Super Cup: 2012

Safa

- Lebanese Super Cup: 2013

Racing Beirut

- Lebanese Challenge Cup: 2016, 2017

== See also ==
- List of Lebanon international footballers born outside Lebanon
