= Achyronas-Onisilos FC =

Cypriot football club

Achyronas-Onisilos
- Full name: Achyronas-Onisilos Football Club
- Founded: 2022; 4 years ago
- Ground: Sotira Municipal Stadium, Sotira
- Capacity: 2,500
- Chairman: Petros Giannidis
- Manager: Panayiotis Spyrou
- League: Third Division
- 2025–26: Second Division, 16th of 16 (relegated)
- Website: www.achyronas-onisilosfc.com

Achyronas-Onisilos Football Club (Greek: Ποδοσφαιρικός Όμιλος Αχυρώνας-Ονήσιλος) is a Cypriot football club based in Sotira and Liopetri in the province of Famagusta, founded in 2022 as a merger of Achyronas Liopetriou and Onisilos Sotira 2014.

== History ==
The club was officially formed on 23 June 2022 from the merger of Achyronas Liopetriou and Onisilos Sotira 2014. The headquarters of the team is the Municipal Stadium Sotiras while the training sessions are held at the Community Stadium of Liopetri. They participate in the Cypriot Second Division.

== Current squad ==
As of 14 September, 2025

Note: Flags indicate national team as defined under FIFA eligibility rules; some limited exceptions apply. Players may hold more than one non-FIFA nationality.

| No. | Pos. | Nation | Player |
|---|---|---|---|
| 2 | DF | GRE | Stelios Cani |
| 3 | DF | CYP | Adamos Kosma |
| 4 | DF | LBN | Jad Smaira |
| 5 | DF | SWE | Joseph Khalife |
| 6 | MF | CYP | Loukas Xiouros |
| 7 | FW | CYP | Omiros Katsiou |
| 10 | MF | CYP | Konstantinos Michail |
| 12 | GK | CYP | Georgios Michail |
| 13 | DF | CYP | Andreas Andreou |
| 14 | MF | GRE | Georgios Georgoulakis |
| 15 | MF | CYP | Konstantinos Konstantinou (on loan from Anorthosis) |
| 16 | FW | NGA | Lawal Abubakar |

| No. | Pos. | Nation | Player |
|---|---|---|---|
| 19 | MF | CYP | Panagiotis Markou (on loan from Anorthosis) |
| 21 | DF | CYP | Petros Paschali (on loan from Anorthosis) |
| 22 | FW | NED | Delano Costella |
| 24 | DF | CYP | Prokopios Terizis |
| 27 | MF | CYP | Orestis Panagiotou |
| 43 | FW | CYP | Pantelis Tavrou |
| 55 | DF | CYP | Dimitris Moulazimis |
| 77 | FW | EGY | Ali Mido |
| 98 | GK | CYP | Elenios Georgiou |
| 99 | GK | GER | Kilian Neufeld |
| -- | GK | RUS | Platon Mamedov |
