= Aradippou =

Aradippou Αραδίππου (Greek)
- Municipality
- Location in Cyprus
- Coordinates: 34°57′10″N 33°35′24″E
- Country: Cyprus
- District: Larnaca District

Government
  - Type: Municipality
  - Mayor: Christodoulos Partou

Population (2011)
  - Total: 19,228
- Time zone: UTC+2 (EET)
  - Summer (DST): UTC+3 (EEST)
- Website: www.aradippou.org.cy

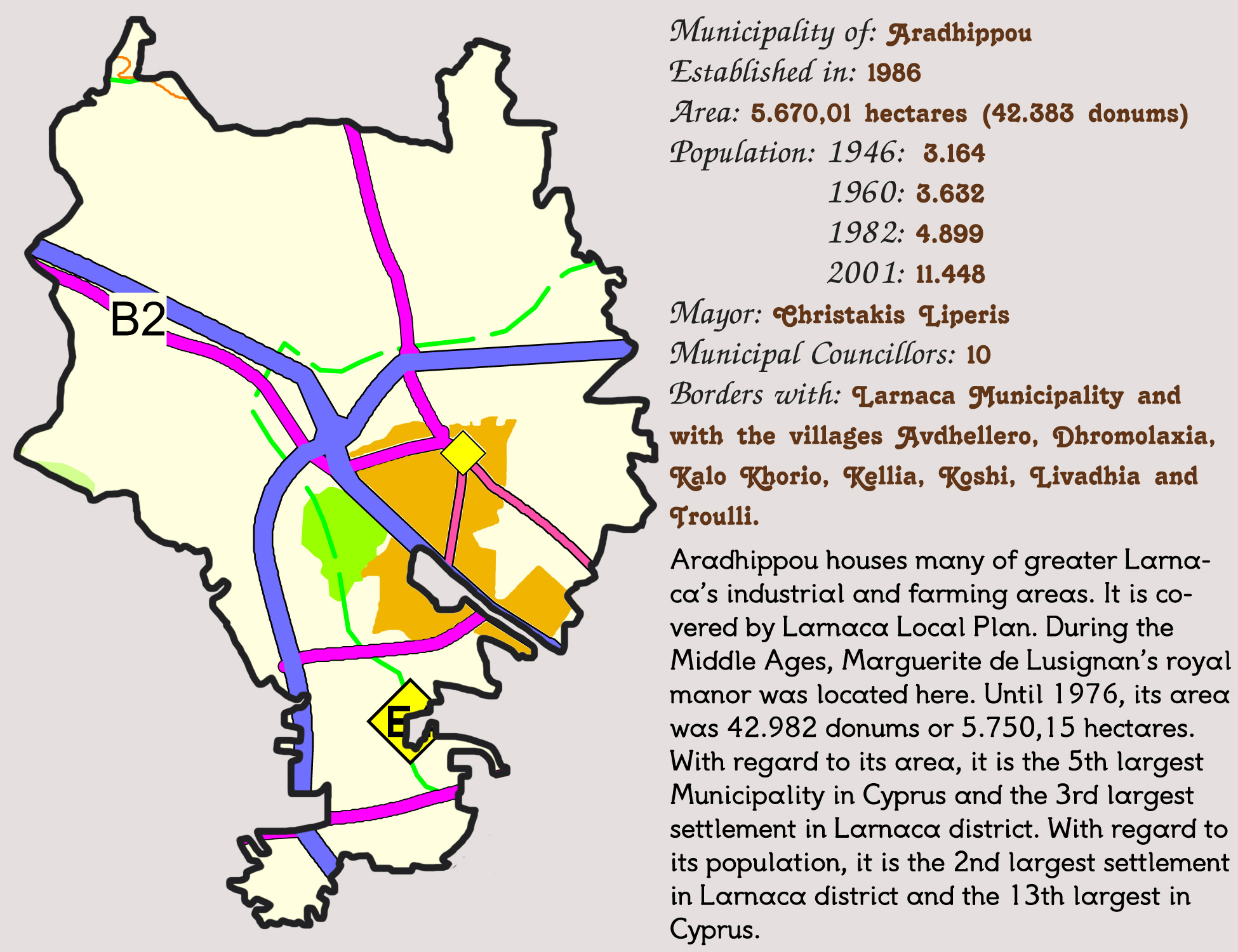
Concise presentation of Aradippou

Aradippou (Greek: Αραδίππου [locally [aɾaˈðipʰu]]) is a town and municipality in Cyprus, located on the outskirts of the city of Larnaca. It was established in 1986 following a referendum of local residents. It has a population of approximately 20,000. After it received town status, Aradippou defined its municipal limits and is now the second-largest municipality of Cyprus as it extends over an area of 42,982 square governmental acres.

== Name ==
The name Aradippou derives from its first settler, either King Aradippos or Radippos, with two versions of its origin. The first suggests Aradippos came from the island of Arados off the coast of Syria. The second version refers to Radippos (or Rhodippos), of Greek descent, who settled near the southern shores of Cyprus after the Trojan War, founding a settlement there.

== History ==
According to archaeological findings, Aradippou has been inhabited since the time of the Achaeans.

During the Middle Ages, it was known as the Court of the Despotissa due to a royal mansion belonging to Margarita de Lusignan, sister of King Leon VI and granddaughter of Amalric. This mansion was destroyed in 1425 by Mamluk raids.

Aradippou was established as a municipality in 1986, following a referendum on February 23, where 98% of the residents voted in favor of transforming the Improvement Council (ancestor of the community council institution) into a municipality. The first municipal council was elected on May 25, 1986, and assumed duties on June 1, 1986.

== Twinned cities ==
- Neapolis, Greece (since 2001)
- Mouresi, Greece

== Football clubs ==
- Ermis Aradippou
- Omonia Aradippou
