= Peyia 2014 =

Cypriot football club

- Founded: 2014
- Dissolved: 2025
- Ground: Peyia Municipal Stadium
- Capacity: 3,830
- Chairman: Femis Sagirov
- Manager: Demetris Ioannou
- 2024–25: Second Division, 16th of 16 (relegated)

Peyia 2014 (Greek: Πέγεια 2014) was a Cypriot football club based in Peyia of the Paphos District. It merged with AS Mandrion to form Akamas-Mandria 2025 FC.

== History ==
The club was founded in 2014 after the merger of two clubs: Peyia FC 2012 and PAS Peyia.

In March 2024 Femis Sagirov, the former owner of Ukrainian club FC Peremoha Dnipro and of Geroskipou FC, became the chairman of the club.
