= Othellos Athienou FC =

Cypriot football club

- Full name: Αθλητικός Σύλλογος Οθέλλος Αθηαίνου; Athletic Club Othellos Athienou
- Founded: 1933; 93 years ago
- Ground: Giannis Papadakis Stadium; Athienou
- Capacity: 5,500; 2,000
- Chairman: Antonis Chilimintris
- Manager: Oakis Stellenivos
- League: Third Division
- 2024–25: Second Division, 15h of 16 (relegated)
- Website: www.acothellos.com
Home colours	Away colours

Othellos Athienou (Greek: Οθέλλος Αθηαίνου) is a Cypriot football club based in Athienou, Larnaca and competes in the Cypriot first Division. The football department is the only activity of the club at the moment, which participated for the second time in the Cypriot First Division, the top football level division in Cyprus after 8 years from the first season in top flight. The club colours are green and white.

== History ==
Othellos was founded in 1933. The club colours are green and white and they play in Othellos Athienou Stadium. In 1967, the club joined the Cyprus Football Association (CFA) and since then has participated regularly in the all championships of the Association.

Othellos from its foundation has demonstrated "rich" athletic and social activity. From 1987, Othellos is accommodated in its privately owned residence. In 2003 the club acquired the ownership of its football ground.

== Players ==
As of 20 February, 2025

Note: Flags indicate national team as defined under FIFA eligibility rules; some limited exceptions apply. Players may hold more than one non-FIFA nationality.

No.	Pos.	Nation	Player
1	GK	CYP	Demetris Tziakouris
2	DF	CYP	Vasilios Tziakouri
4	DF	CYP	Tryfanos Sofroniou
5	DF	CYP	Kyriacos Kyriacou (Captain)
6	MF	CMR	Simplice Levis
7	FW	GRE	Georgios Stamoulis
8	MF	CYP	Anthos Loizidis
9	FW	CYP	Dimitris Raspas
10	MF	CYP	Dimitris Flouris
11	FW	UKR	Yaroslav Levshyn
15	DF	NGA	Joseph Ogbonna
17	FW	GRE	Pavlos Plakias
18	DF	MAD	Thierno Millimono
21	MF	CYP	Andreas Chatzidimitriou

No.	Pos.	Nation	Player
22	MF	GHA	Charles Toku
23	FW	ITA	Salif Sangare
24	GK	CYP	Andreas Mallouri
25	DF	LVA	Artūrs Ļotčikovs
26	FW	CYP	Lampros Vasiliou
28	DF	CYP	Panagiotis Kylilis
35	DF	CYP	Christodoulos Pavli
38	GK	CYP	Michalis Sofroniou
41	MF	ISR	Shon Weiss
57	DF	CYP	Grigorios Mouchli
70	FW	CYP	Demis Maisuradze
77	MF	BEL	Giorgi Iosava
79	DF	CYP	Andreas Schizas
99	DF	CYP	Andreas Panagiotou

=== Out on loan ===
Note: Flags indicate national team as defined under FIFA eligibility rules; some limited exceptions apply. Players may hold more than one non-FIFA nationality.

No.	Pos.	Nation	Player

== Achievements ==
- Cypriot Second Division Winners: 1

2022–23

- Cypriot Third Division Winners: 2

1990–91, 1993–94

- Cypriot Fourth Division Winners: 1

2004
