= Sotira, Famagusta =

Sotira: Σωτήρα (Greek); Sotira (Turkish)
- Municipality
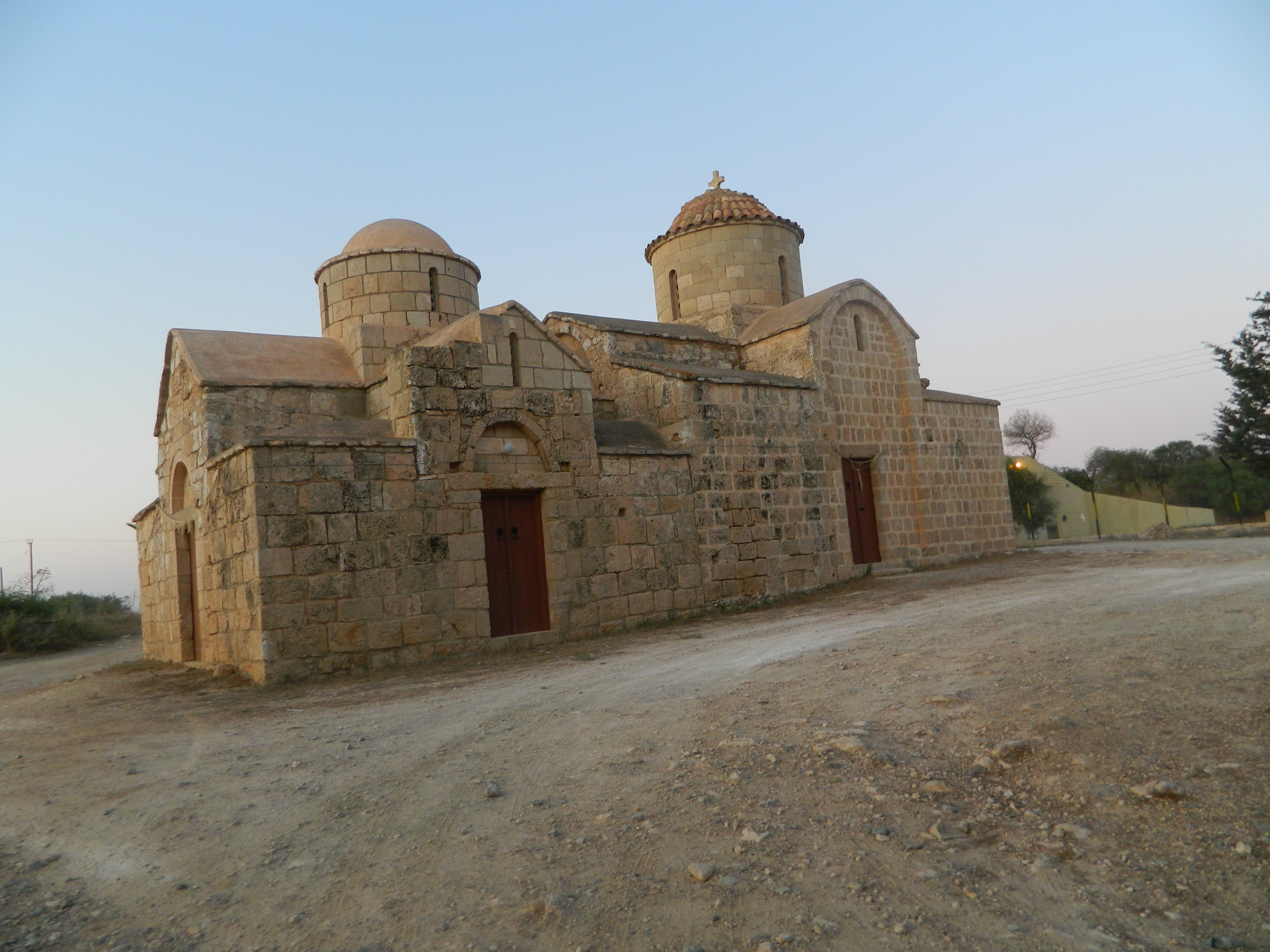
- Agios Georgios Chortakio

- Location within Cyprus
- Coordinates: 35°01′36″N 33°57′01″E
- Country: Cyprus
- District: Famagusta District

Population (2011)
  - Total: 5,474
- Website: www.sotira.org.cy

Sotira (Greek: Σωτήρα; Turkish: Sotira) is a town in the Famagusta District of Cyprus, west of Paralimni. In 2011, it had a population of 5,474.

== Gallery ==
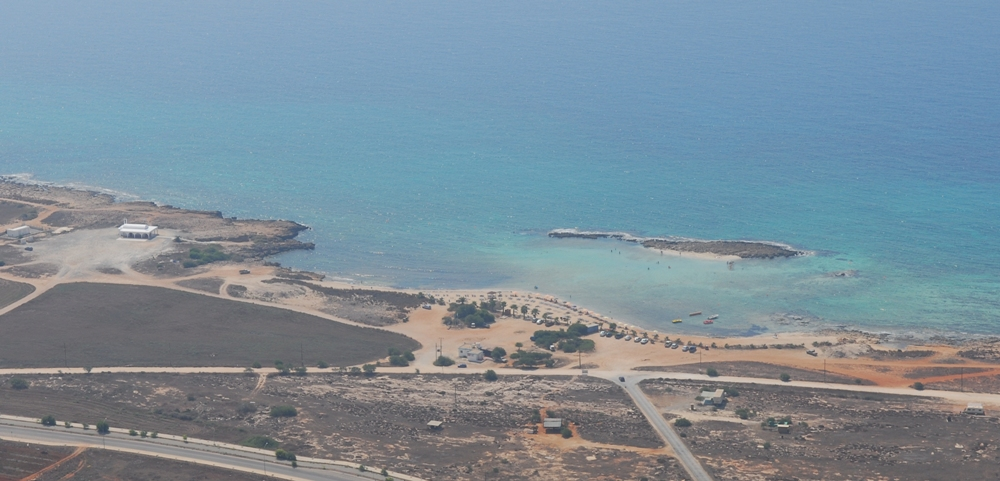
Aerial view of the beach and the chapel

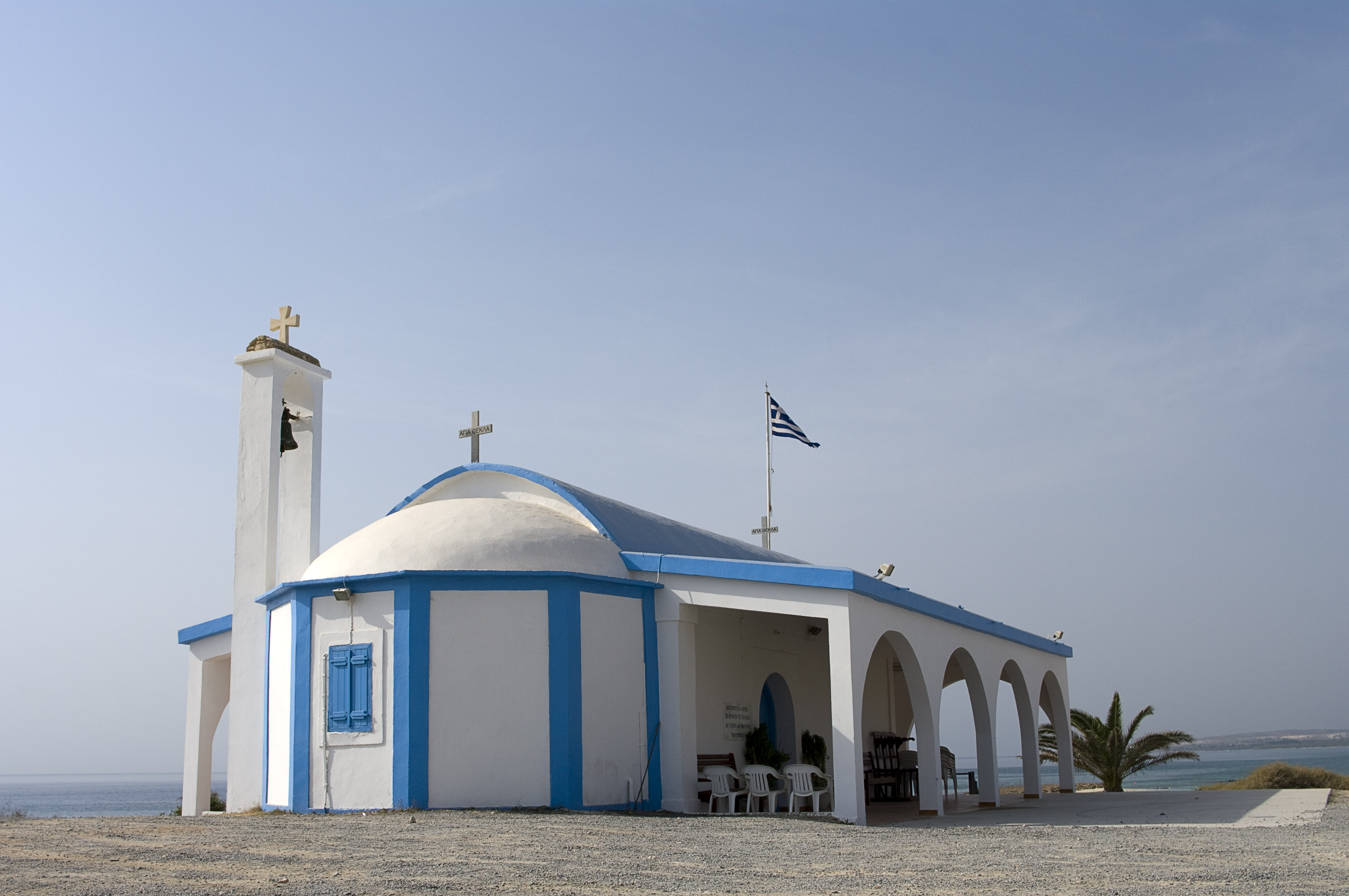
St Thekla chapel

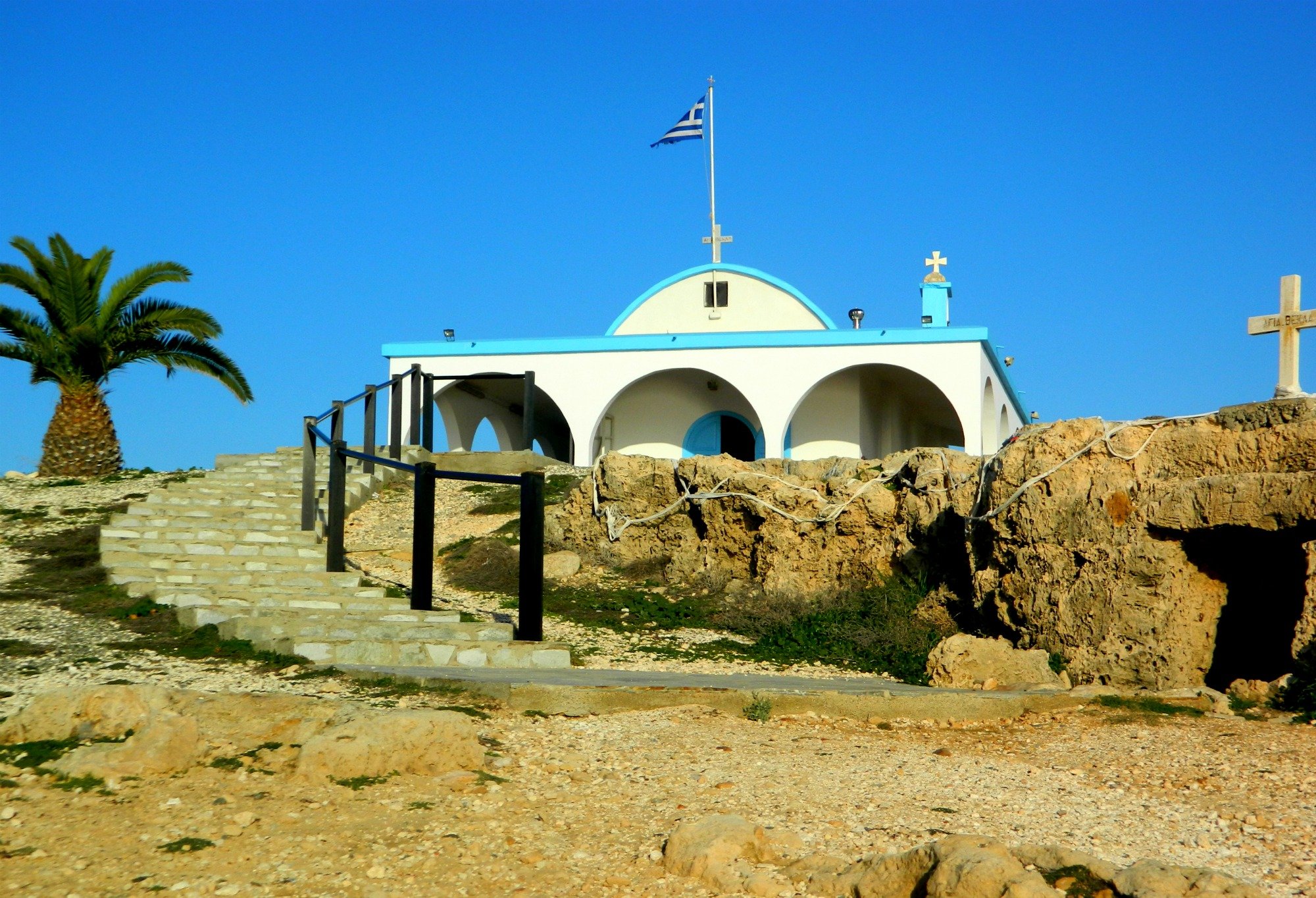
St Thekla chapel

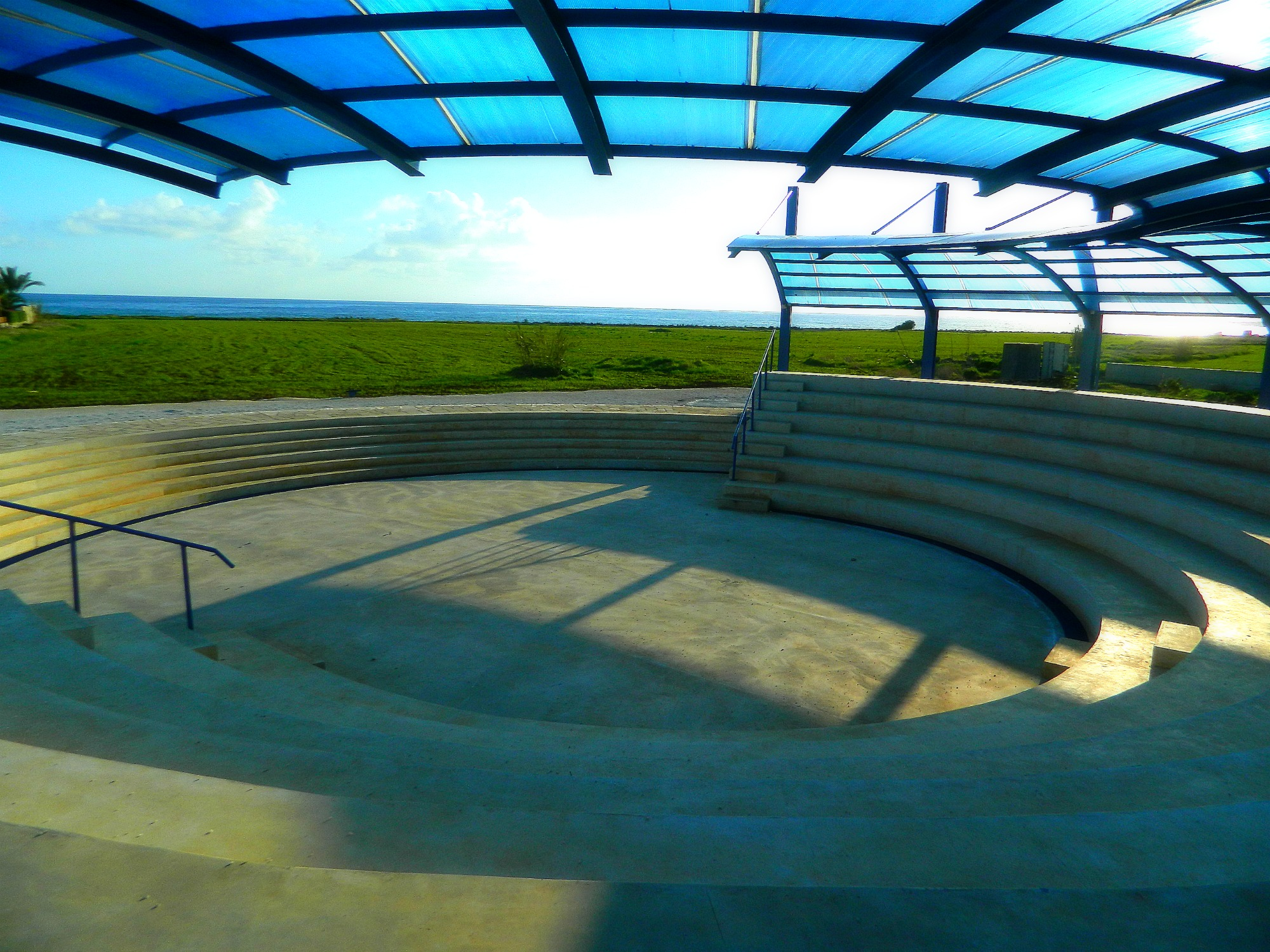
Sotira's municipal amphitheatre

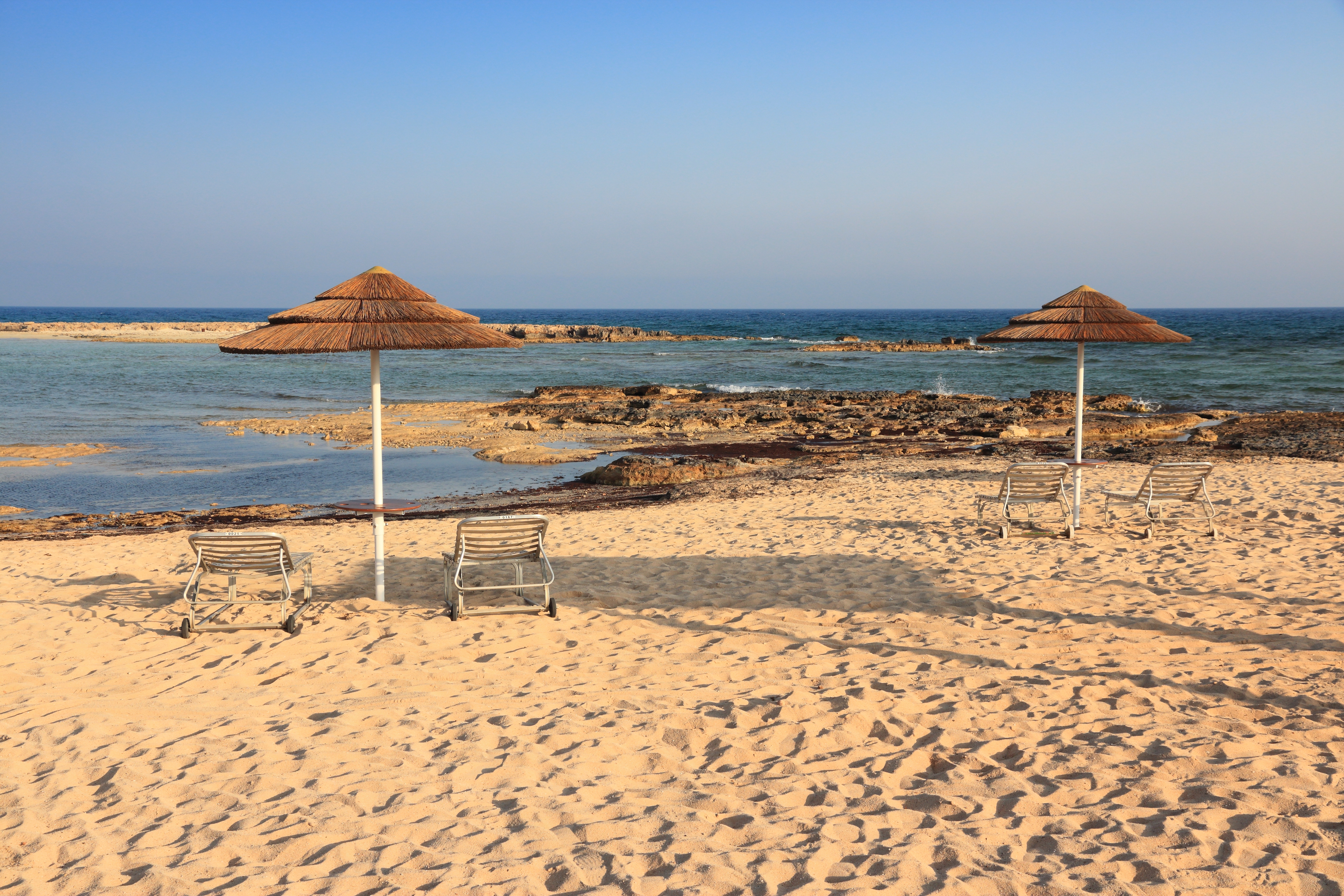
The beach of Ayia Thekla

== See also ==
- Onisilos Sotira, the town's football club
