= 2011–12 Cypriot Fourth Division =

Cypriot Fourth Division
- Season: 2011–12
- Champions: Digenis (2nd title)
- Promoted: Digenis; Karmiotissa; Ethnikos
- Relegated: Kedros; AEK Korakou; AEK Kythreas
- Matches: 209
- Goals: 572 (2.74 per match)
- Top goalscorer: Peter Kiška (20 goals)

The 2011–12 Cypriot Fourth Division was the 27th season of the Cypriot fourth-level football league. Digenis Oroklinis won their 2nd title.

== Format ==
Fifteen teams participated in the 2011–12 Cypriot Fourth Division. All teams played against each other twice, once at their home and once away. The team with the most points at the end of the season crowned champions. The first three teams were promoted to the 2012–13 Cypriot Third Division and the last three teams were relegated to regional leagues.

=== Point system ===
Teams received three points for a win, one point for a draw and zero points for a loss.

== Changes from previous season ==
Teams promoted to 2011–12 Cypriot Third Division

- Ormideia FC
- POL/AE Maroni
- Achyronas Liopetriou

Teams relegated from 2010–11 Cypriot Third Division

- Digenis Oroklinis
- MEAP Nisou
- Iraklis Gerolakkou

Teams promoted from regional leagues

- Elpida Astromeriti
- AEK Korakou
- Kedros Ayia Marina Skylloura

Teams relegated to regional leagues

- Anagennisi Trachoniou
- ASPIS Pylas
- Enosis Kokkinotrimithia

Notes:

- AEK Kythreas also participated in 2011–12 Cypriot Fourth Division. AEK's relegation during 2009–10 Cypriot Fourth Division forced the team to suspend operations. The team resumed operations in the 2011–12 season. According to a specific regulation, the refugees football clubs that were resuming their operations could participate in the Cypriot Fourth Division. So, AEK's application to participate in the fourth division was accepted.
- Levadiakos/Salamina Livadion also secured their participation in the 2011–12 Cypriot Fourth Division through the amateur divisions. However, Cyprus Football Association decided that the team did not meet basic requirements for the registering as a member of the federation. After an extraordinary general meeting it was decided that the team was eventually able to join the Cyprus Football Association. But, because the 2011–12 Cypriot Fourth Division had already began, it was decided that the team would book a place to the 2012–13 Cypriot Fourth Division, the next seasons' championship.

== Stadia and locations ==
2011–12 Cypriot Fourth Division

Club	Venue
AEK Korakou	Kakopetria Municipal Stadium
AEK Kythreas	Kykkos Stadium
Digenis Oroklinis	Oroklini Municipal Stadium
Dynamo Pervolion	Pervolia Municipal Stadium
Ethnikos Latsion FC	Latsia Municipal Stadium
Elpida Astromeriti	Akaki Municipal Stadium
THOI Lakatamia	EN THOI Stadium
Iraklis Gerolakkou	Kykkos Stadium
Karmiotissa Pano Polemidion	Pano Polemidia Municipal Stadium
Kedros Ayia Marina Skylloura	Stadium Keryneia Epistrophi
Kissos Kissonergas	Kissonerga Municipal Stadium
Konstantios & Evripidis Trachoniou	Trachoni Municipal Stadium
MEAP Nisou	Theodorio Koinotiko
P.O. Xylotymvou	Xylotympou Municipal Stadium
Finikas Ayias Marinas Chrysochous	Evripides Municipal Stadium

== League standings ==
Pos	Team	Pld	W	D	L	GF	GA	GD	Pts	Promotion or relegation
1	Digenis Oroklinis (C, P)	28	19	7	2	69	24	+45	64	Promoted to Cypriot Third Division
2	Karmiotissa Pano Polemidion (P)	28	17	6	5	60	22	+38	57	Promoted to Cypriot Third Division
3	Ethnikos Latsion FC (P)	28	14	5	9	33	23	+10	47	Promoted to Cypriot Third Division
4	P.O. Xylotymvou	28	12	10	6	41	22	+19	46 (Note: POX 4p; THOI 1p)	Qualification for promotion play-off (Note: Because APOP Kinyras (which would participate in the 2012–13 Cypriot Third Division) was relegated after a FIFA decision to the Cypriot Fourth Division, the 4th placed team P.O. Xylotymvou played a single relegation playoff match against the 12th placed team of the 2011–12 Cypriot Third Division, Achyronas Liopetriou. Achyronas won (2–2 full-time score, 5–4 penalty) and remained in the Third Division.)
5	THOI Lakatamia	28	12	10	6	31	19	+12	46	
6	Konstantios & Evripidis Trachoniou	28	12	5	11	42	43	−1	41	
7	Finikas Ayias Marinas Chrysochous	28	10	8	10	31	29	+2	38 (Note: Foinikas 3p, 2–2, 1 a.; Kissos FC 3p, 2–2, 0 a.)	
8	Kissos Kissonergas	28	11	5	12	53	53	0	38	
9	Elpida Astromeriti	28	9	9	10	37	41	−4	36 (Note: Elpida 6p; Iraklis 0p)	
10	Iraklis Gerolakkou	28	10	6	12	38	44	−6	36	
11	MEAP Nisou	28	8	11	9	35	30	+5	35 (Note: MEAP 7p; Dynamo 6p; Kedros 4p)	
12	Dynamo Pervolion	28	11	2	15	33	49	−16	35	
13	Kedros Ayia Marina Skylloura (R)	27	10	5	12	26	39	−13	35 (Note: The match between Kedros Ayia Marina Skylloura and AEK Korakou was declared void; it would not be rescheduled, and neither team got any points or goals attributed; it was counted in the matches played column but not in the matches lost column.)	Relegated to regional leagues
14	AEK Korakou (R)	27	4	2	21	21	68	−47	14	Relegated to regional leagues
15	AEK Kythreas (R)	28	2	5	21	22	66	−44	11	Relegated to regional leagues

Source: League standings at CFA
Rules for classification: 1) points; 2) head-to-head points; 3) head-to-head goal difference; 4) head-to-head away goals scored; 5) goal difference; 6) number of goals scored.
(C) Champions; (P) Promoted; (R) Relegated

== Results ==
Home \ Away	AKR	AKK	DGN	DNM	THL	ETN	ELP	IRK	KRM	KDR	KSS	KET	MPN	POX	FNK
AEK Korakou		3–0	2–1	1–4	0–0	0–0	0–1	0–1	1–2	0–2	1–2	3–1	1–0	0–1	1–4
AEK Kythreas	2–0		1–3	0–1	1–2	0–3	3–1	0–1	0–3	0–2	1–5	0–1	2–3	0–5	0–0
Digenis	7–1	5–1		2–1	0–0	2–0	3–1	5–2	4–2	2–0	3–0	2–0	3–0	4–1	2–0
Dinamo	3–1	2–0	0–3		1–0	1–0	3–0	1–1	0–3	2–1	1–3	0–2	0–2	2–6	1–0
THOI	2–1	3–1	2–2	1–0		1–0	1–1	3–1	0–0	0–1	1–1	0–1	2–1	0–0	0–0
Ethnikos	3–0	2–1	1–1	1–0	1–0		1–1	1–2	1–2	3–2	2–0	1–0	1–1	2–0	2–2
Elpida	4–0	1–1	0–3	2–0	0–0	2–1		1–0	0–0	3–1	2–0	1–2	2–2	1–2	2–2
Iraklis	4–0	3–0	3–2	1–3	0–1	0–1	1–2		2–1	2–2	3–0	3–3	0–2	0–0	0–2
Karmiotissa	4–1	6–0	0–0	1–0	1–1	2–0	5–2	4–0		7–0	2–0	4–1	1–0	0–3 (Note: The match between Karmiotissa and P.O. Xylotymvou was interrupted at 0–1; It was awarded 0–3 to P.O. Xylotymvou.)	1–0
Kedros	– (Note: The match Kedros between Ayia Marina Skylloura and AEK Korakou was declared void; it would not be rescheduled, and neither team got any points or goals attributed; it was counted in the matches played column but not in the matches lost column.)	2–1	0–0	0–1	1–0	2–1	3–1	0–1	1–1		2–1	0–1	0–0	0–1	0–2
Kissos	6–0	3–2	2–4	7–3	1–4	1–0	2–1	4–4	0–3	2–2		1–3	3–1	0–3	2–1
K & E	4–0	2–2	2–3	4–3	0–2	0–2	3–2	1–2	0–2	4–0	2–6		0–0	0–0	1–1
MEAP	2–1	2–2	0–0	5–0	0–1	0–1	1–1	1–1	2–1	0–1	1–1	3–1		1–1	4–1
POX	6–3	0–0	0–1	0–0	1–0	0–1	1–2	2–0	2–2	3–0	0–0	0–1	1–1		1–0
Finikas	2–0	2–1	2–2	2–0	2–4	0–1	0–0	2–0	1–0	0–1	1–0	0–2	1–0	1–1	

Source: Results at CFA
Legend: Blue = home team win; Yellow = draw; Red = away team win.

== Playoff ==
19 August 2012
16:30

Achyronas Liopetriou	2–2	P.O. Xylotymvou
Elia 52', 75'		Panagi 55', 59'
Penalties
	5–4

Dasaki Stadium, Achna
Attendance: 1,500
Referee: Marios Ioannou

Source: Result at CFA

== See also ==
- Cypriot Fourth Division
- 2011–12 Cypriot First Division
- 2011–12 Cypriot Cup for lower divisions
- Cypriot football league system

== Sources ==
- Official website (in Greek)
- "2011/12 Cypriot Fourth Division". Rec.Sport.Soccer Statistics Foundation. 2016-01-14.
- "League standings" (in Greek). Cyprus Football Association. Archived from the original on 2015-09-23.
- "Results" (in Greek). Cyprus Football Association.
- "Teams" (in Greek). Cyprus Football Association.
- "Scorers" (in Greek). Cyprus Football Association.
