= 2011–12 Cypriot Third Division =

Football league season

Cypriot Third Division
- Season: 2011–12
- Champions: AEK Kouklia (1st title)
- Promoted: AEK Kouklia; Nikos & Sokratis; AEZ
- Relegated: Anagennisi; POL/AEM
- Matches: 182
- Goals: 489 (2.69 per match)
- Top goalscorer: Dion Esajas (21 goals)

The 2011–12 Cypriot Third Division was the 41st season of the Cypriot third-level football league. AEK Kouklia won their 1st title.

== Format ==
Fourteen teams participated in the 2011–12 Cypriot Third Division. All teams played against each other twice, once at their home and once away. The team with the most points at the end of the season crowned champions. The first three teams were promoted to the 2012–13 Cypriot Second Division and the last three teams were relegated to the 2012–13 Cypriot Fourth Division.

However, in the summer, because APOP Kinyras (which would participate in the 2012–13 Cypriot Third Division) was relegated to the 2012–13 Cypriot Fourth Division after FIFA's decision, the 12th placed team Achyronas Liopetriou played a single relegation playoff match against the 4th placed team of the 2011–12 Cypriot Fourth Division, P.O. Xylotymvou for a place in the 2012–13 Cypriot Third Division.

=== Point system ===
Teams received three points for a win, one point for a draw and zero points for a loss.

== Changes from previous season ==
Teams promoted to 2011–12 Cypriot Second Division

- Ethnikos Assia
- Enosis Neon Parekklisia
- Ayia Napa

Teams relegated from 2010–11 Cypriot Second Division

- ASIL Lysi
- Digenis Akritas Morphou
- Adonis Idaliou

Teams promoted from 2010–11 Cypriot Fourth Division

- Ormideia FC
- POL/AE Maroni
- Achyronas Liopetriou

Teams relegated to 2011–12 Cypriot Fourth Division

- Digenis Oroklinis
- MEAP Nisou
- Iraklis Gerolakkou

== Stadia and locations ==
2011–12 Cypriot Third Division

Club	Venue
Adonis	Adonis Idaliou Stadium
AEZ	Zakaki Municipal Stadium
AEK	Kouklia Municipal Stadium
Anagennisi	Germasogeia Municipal Stadium
ASIL	Stadium Grigoris Afxentiou
Achyronas	Liopetri Municipal Stadium
Digenis	Makario Stadium
Elpida	Michalonikion Stadium
ENAD	Poli Chrysochous Municipal Stadium
Nikos & Sokratis	Erimi Municipal Stadium
Ormideia FC	Ormideia Municipal Stadium
POL/AEM	Maroni Municipal Stadium
Spartakos	Kiti Municipal Stadium
Frenaros FC	Frenaros Municipal Stadium

== League standings ==
Pos	Team	Pld	W	D	L	GF	GA	GD	Pts	Promotion or relegation
1	AEK Kouklia (C, P)	26	20	1	5	62	16	+46	61	Promoted to Cypriot Second Division
2	Nikos & Sokratis Erimis (P)	26	16	5	5	42	26	+16	53	Promoted to Cypriot Second Division
3	AEZ Zakakiou (P)	26	16	4	6	43	28	+15	52	Promoted to Cypriot Second Division
4	ASIL Lysi	26	13	7	6	56	26	+30	46	
5	Adonis Idaliou	26	12	6	8	43	33	+10	42	
6	ENAD Polis Chrysochous	26	10	8	8	39	33	+6	38	
7	Spartakos Kitiou	26	11	4	11	36	28	+8	37	
8	Digenis Akritas Morphou	26	9	6	11	33	35	−2	33	
9	Frenaros FC	26	6	14	6	29	33	−4	32	
10	Elpida Xylofagou	26	8	7	11	26	36	−10	31	
11	Ormideia FC	26	8	6	12	27	33	−6	30	
12	Achyronas Liopetriou (O)	26	8	4	14	32	46	−14	28	Qualification for relegation play-off
13	Anagennisi Germasogeias (R)	26	5	8	13	21	38	−17	23	Relegated to Cypriot Fourth Division
14	POL AE Maroni (D, R)	26	0	0	26	0	78	−78	0	(Note: POL/AE Maroni withdrew after 14th round for financial reasons. All their matches are awarded 0–3 against them.)

Source: League standings at CFA
Rules for classification: 1) points; 2) head-to-head points; 3) head-to-head goal difference; 4) head-to-head away goals scored; 5) goal difference; 6) number of goals scored.
(C) Champions; (D) Disqualified; (O) Play-off winners; (P) Promoted; (R) Relegated

== Results ==
Home \ Away	ADN	AEZ	AEK	ANG	ASL	ACR	DGN	ELP	END	NSE	ORM	POL (Note: POL/AE Maroni withdrew after the 14th round for financial reasons. All their matches are awarded 0–3 against them.)	SPR	FRN
Adonis		1–2	1–2	1–1	0–0	3–3	3–1	1–0	1–0	4–2	2–1	3–0	2–1	1–2
AEZ	2–1		3–2	1–0	2–1	4–1	2–1	6–0	0–0	2–1	2–0	3–0	2–1	2–0
AEK	3–0	2–0		2–0	1–0	5–0	4–1	2–0	3–0	1–0	2–1	3–0	2–3	6–0
Anagennisi	1–2	2–2	2–1		0–0	0–0	0–0	1–0	0–2	0–1	0–0	3–0	0–3	2–0
ASIL	2–2	6–0	2–1	3–0		3–0	1–2	4–1	3–2	7–1	2–1	3–0	4–1	0–0
Achyronas	1–0	0–1	1–3	2–1	0–2		3–1	3–1	5–3	1–2	1–0	3–0	1–3	0–2
Digenis	0–3	1–2	0–1	1–0	2–2	1–0		3–1	1–2	1–2	3–0	3–0	2–1	1–1
Elpida	1–0	1–1	0–3	5–3	2–0	1–1	1–1		0–0	0–1	2–1	3–0	2–1	0–0
ENAD	1–1	3–0	0–3	4–0	3–3	3–1	3–1	1–0		1–1	2–2	3–0	1–0	2–2
Nikos & Sokratis	3–2	1–0	1–0	4–1	3–1	3–0	0–0	0–1	2–0		1–0	3–0	0–0	3–1
Ormideia FC	1–2	1–0	1–6	3–0	1–0	1–0	1–0	1–1	3–0	1–1		3–0	0–0	1–3
POL/AEM (Note: POL/AE Maroni withdrew after the 14th round for financial reasons. All their matches are awarded 0–3 against them.)	0–3	0–3	0–3	0–3	0–3	0–3	0–3	0–3	0–3	0–3	0–3		0–3	0–3
Spartakos	1–2	1–0	0–1	0–0	0–3	1–0	2–3	2–0	1–0	0–0	3–0	3–0		3–0
Frenaros FC	2–2	1–1	0–0	1–1	1–1	2–2	0–0	0–0	0–0	2–3	0–0	3–0	3–2	

Source: Results at CFA
Legend: Blue = home team win; Yellow = draw; Red = away team win.

== Relegation playoff ==
19 August 2012
16:30

Achyronas Liopetriou	2–2	P.O. Xylotymvou
Elia 52', 75'		Panagi 55', 59'
Penalties
	5–4

Dasaki Stadium, Achna
Attendance: 1,500
Referee: Marios Ioannou

Source: Result at CFA

== See also ==
- Cypriot Third Division
- 2011–12 Cypriot First Division
- 2011–12 Cypriot Cup for lower divisions

== Sources ==
- "2011/12 Cypriot Third Division". Rec.Sport.Soccer Statistics Foundation. 2016-01-14.
- "League standings" (in Greek). Cyprus Football Association.
- "Results" (in Greek). Cyprus Football Association.
- "Teams" (in Greek). Cyprus Football Association.
- "Scorers" (in Greek). Cyprus Football Association.
- "3. DIVISION". Soccerway. Archived from the original on September 25, 2014.
