= 2011–12 Cypriot Cup for lower divisions =

Tournament details
- Country: Cyprus
- Dates: 26 October 2011 – 1 April 2012
- Teams: 20

Final positions
- Champions: Digenis (1st title)
- Runners-up: AEK Kouklia

The 2011–12 Cypriot Cup for lower divisions was the 4th edition of the Cypriot Cup for lower divisions. A total of 20 clubs entered the competition. It began on 26 October 2011 with the first round and concluded on 1 April 2012 with the final which was held at Parekklisia Municipal Stadium. Digenis Morphou won their 1st cup trophy after beating AEK Kouklia 2–1 in the final.

== Format ==
Only teams from the Cypriot Third Division and Cypriot Fourth Division could participate. Participation was not compulsory. 24 of 28 participated that season.

The competition consisted of five rounds. In the first and in the second round each tie was played as a single leg and was held at the home ground of one of the two teams, according to the draw results. Each tie winner was qualifying to the next round. If a match was drawn, extra time was following. If extra time was drawn, there was a replay at the ground of the team who were away for the first game. If the rematch was also drawn, then extra time was following and if the match remained drawn after extra time the winner was decided by penalty shoot-out.

The next two rounds were played in a two-legged format, each team playing a home and an away match against their opponent. The team which scored more goals on aggregate, was qualifying to the next round. If the two teams scored the same number of goals on aggregate, then the team which scored more goals away from home was advancing to the next round.

If both teams had scored the same number of home and away goals, then extra time was following after the end of the second leg match. If during the extra thirty minutes both teams had managed to score, but they had scored the same number of goals, then the team who scored the away goals was advancing to the next round (i.e. the team which was playing away). If there weren't scored any goals during extra time, the qualifying team was determined by penalty shoot-out.

The final was a single match.

== First round ==
12 out of the 20 teams were drawn to qualify directly to the second round, without needing to play any match.

Team 1	Result	Team 2
(D) Konstantios & Evripidis	3 - 0	Elpida Xylofagou (D)
(C) MEAP Nisou	1 - 0	ENTHOI Lakatamia FC (C)
(D) P.O. Xylotymvou 2006	2 - 4 (aet)	Digenis Oroklinis (D)
(D) Finikas Ayias Marinas	1 - 0	Kissos FC Kissonergas (D)
(C) Achyronas Liopetriou	bye
(C) Adonis Idaliou	bye
(C) AEK Kouklia	bye
(C) AEZ Zakakiou	bye
(C) ASIL Lysi	bye
(C) Digenis Morphou	bye
(D) Elpida Astromeriti	bye
(C) ENAD Polis Chrysochous	bye
(C) Frenaros FC 2000	bye
(D) Kedros Ayia Marina	bye
(C) POL/AE Maroni	bye
(C) Spartakos Kitiou	bye

== Second round ==
Team 1	Result	Team 2
(C) Adonis Idaliou	0 - 3	ENAD Polis Chrysochous FC (C)
(C) AEZ Zakakiou	3 - 2	Konstantios & Euripidis (D)
(C) AEK Kouklia F.C.	6 - 2	Elpida Astromeriti (D)
(C) ASIL Lysi	3 - 2	POL/AE Maroni (C)
(C) Achyronas Liopetriou	1 - 0	Digenis Oroklinis (D)
(C) Spartakos Kitiou	2 - 4	MEAP Nisou (D)
(D) Finikas Ayias Marinas	1 - 0	Kedros Ayia Marina (D)
(C) Frenaros FC 2000	1 - 2	Digenis Morphou (C)

== Quarter-finals ==
Team 1	Agg.	Team 2	1st leg	2nd leg
(C) AEZ Zakakiou	7 - 0	ASIL Lysi (C)	3 - 0	4 - 0
(C) AEK Kouklia	8 - 3	Foinikas Ayias Marinas (D)	5 - 1	2 - 3
(C) ENAD Polis Chrysochous	8 - 1	Achyronas Liopetriou (C)	4 - 0	4 - 1
(D) MEAP Nisou	2 - 4	Digenis Morphou (C)	1 - 3	1 - 1

== Semi-finals ==
Team 1	Agg.	Team 2	1st leg	2nd leg
(C) AEK Kouklia F.C.	(a.) 5 - 5	AEZ Zakakiou (C)	3 - 1	2 - 4
(C) Digenis Morphou	3 - 1	ENAD Polis Chrysochous (C)	1 - 1	2 - 0

== Final ==
1 April 2012

Digenis Morphou	2 – 1 (a.e.t.)	AEK Kouklia
Konstantinou 24'; Evangelou 102'	(Report)	36' Monteiro

Parekklisia Municipal Stadium, Parekklisia
Attendance: 700

Cypriot Cup for lower divisions 2011–12 Winners
Digenis Morphou
1st Title

== Sources ==
- "Cyprus 2011/12". Rec.Sport.Soccer Statistics Foundation. 2016-01-14.
- Official website (in Greek)

== See also ==
- Cypriot Cup for lower divisions
- 2011–12 Cypriot Third Division
- 2011–12 Cypriot Fourth Division
