= 2008–09 Cypriot Cup for lower divisions =

Tournament details
- Country: Cyprus
- Dates: 11 October 2008 – 29 March 2009
- Teams: 19

Final positions
- Champions: Elpida (1st title)
- Runners-up: Digenis Or.

The 2008–09 Cypriot Cup for lower divisions was the 1st edition of the Cypriot Cup for lower divisions. A total of 19 clubs entered the competition. It began on 11 October 2008 with the first round and concluded on 29 March 2009 with the final which was held at Dasaki Stadium. Elpida won their 1st cup trophy after beating Digenis 2–1 in the final.

== Format ==
Only teams from the Cypriot Third Division and Cypriot Fourth Division could participate. Participation was not compulsory. 19 of 28 participated that season.

The competition consisted of five rounds. In the first and in the second round each tie was played as a single leg and was held at the home ground of one of the two teams, according to the draw results. Each tie winner was qualifying to the next round. If a match was drawn, extra time was following. If extra time was drawn, there was a replay at the ground of the team who were away for the first game. If the rematch was also drawn, then extra time was following and if the match remained drawn after extra time the winner was decided by penalty shoot-out.

The next two rounds were played in a two-legged format, each team playing a home and an away match against their opponent. The team which scored more goals on aggregate, was qualifying to the next round. If the two teams scored the same number of goals on aggregate, then the team which scored more goals away from home was advancing to the next round.

If both teams had scored the same number of home and away goals, then extra time was following after the end of the second leg match. If during the extra thirty minutes both teams had managed to score, but they had scored the same number of goals, then the team who scored the away goals was advancing to the next round (i.e. the team which was playing away). If there weren't scored any goals during extra time, the qualifying team was determined by penalty shoot-out.

The final was a single match.

== First round ==
13 out of the 19 teams were drawn to qualify directly to the second round, without needing to play any match.

Team 1	Result	Team 2
(D) Dafni Troulloi	2 - 4	Adonis Idaliou (C)
(C) Kissos FC Kissonergas	0 - 2	AEK Kouklia F.C. (C)
(C) Frenaros FC 2000	1 - 0	Spartakos Kitiou (C)
(C) Akritas Chlorakas	bye
(C) Anagennisi Deryneia	bye
(D) Anagennisi Germasogeias	bye
(D) ASPIS Pylas	bye
(C) Digenis Oroklinis	bye
(C) Elpida Xylofagou	bye
(D) Enosis Neon Parekklisia	bye
(D) Konstantios & Evripidis Trachoniou	bye
(D) Nikos & Sokratis Erimis	bye
(C) Olympos Xylofagou	bye
(C) Othellos Athienou	bye
(D) P.O. Xylotymvou 2006	bye
(D) Sourouklis Troullon	bye

== Second round ==
In the second round participated the winners of the first round ties.

Team 1	Result	Team 2
(C) Akritas Chlorakas	1 - 0	AEK Kouklia F.C. (C)
(D) Anagennisi Germasogeias	1 - 1 (4 - 5 p.)	Digenis Oroklinis (C)
(D) ASPIS Pylas	1 - 3	Anagennisi Deryneia (C)
(D) Enosis Neon Parekklisia F.C.	0 - 2	Konstantios & Evripidis (D)
(D) Nikos & Sokratis Erimis	0 - 1	Adonis Idaliou (C)
(C) Olympos Xylofagou	2 - 0	Frenaros FC 2000 (C)
(D) P.O. Xylotymvou 2006	3 - 2 (aet.)	Othellos Athienou F.C. (C)
(D) Sourouklis Troullon	0 - 3	Elpida Xylofagou (C)

== Quarter-finals ==
Team 1	Agg.	Team 2	1st leg	2nd leg
(C) Adonis Idaliou	2 - 3	Elpida Xylofagou (C)	1 - 2	1 - 1
(C) Digenis Oroklinis	5 - 3	Konstantios & Evripidis (D)	3 - 3	2 - 0
(C) Olympos Xylofagou	1 - 10	Anagennisi Deryneia (C)	1 - 4	0 - 6
(D) P.O. Xylotymvou 2006	2 - 3	Akritas Chlorakas (C)	0 - 1	2 - 2

== Semi-finals ==
Team 1	Agg.	Team 2	1st leg	2nd leg
(C) Anagennisi Deryneia	1 - 2	Digenis Oroklinis (C)	1 - 0	0 - 2
(C) Elpida Xylofagou	3 - 1	Akritas Chlorakas (C)	2 - 0	1 - 1

== Final ==
29 March 2009

Elpida Xylofagou	2 – 1 (a.e.t.)	Digenis Oroklinis
Papakyriakou 109'; Thoma 116'	(Report)	105' Nicolaou

Dasaki Stadium, Achna
Attendance: 1,000
Referee: Vasilis Demetriou

Cypriot Cup for lower divisions 2008–09 Winners
Elpida Xylofagou
1st Title

== Sources ==
- "Cyprus 2008/09". Rec.Sport.Soccer Statistics Foundation. 2016-01-14.
- Official website (in Greek)

== See also ==
- Cypriot Cup for lower divisions
- 2008–09 Cypriot Third Division
- 2008–09 Cypriot Fourth Division
