= 2010–11 Cypriot Cup for lower divisions =

Tournament details
- Country: Cyprus
- Dates: 27 October 2010 – 30 March 2011
- Teams: 24

Final positions
- Champions: Ethnikos Assia (1st title)
- Runners-up: ENAD

The 2010–11 Cypriot Cup for lower divisions was the 3rd edition of the Cypriot Cup for lower divisions. A total of 24 clubs entered the competition. It began on 27 October 2010 with the first round and concluded on 30 March 2011 with the final which was held at GSP Stadium. Ethnikos Assia won their 1st cup trophy after beating ENAD Polis Chrysochous 1–0 in the final.

== Format ==
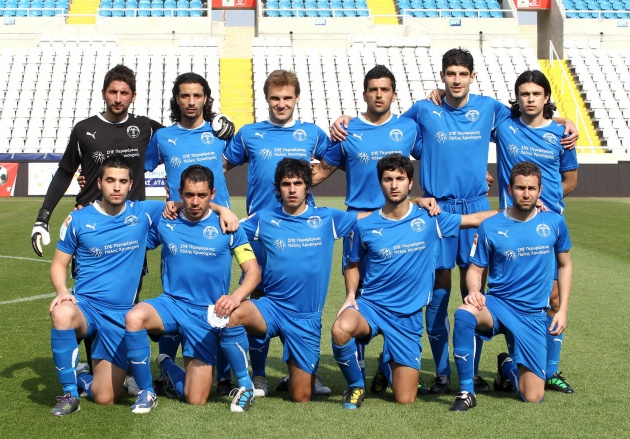
ENAD Polis Chrysochous at the final.

Only teams from the Cypriot Third Division and Cypriot Fourth Division could participate. Participation was not compulsory. 24 of 28 participated that season.

The competition consisted of five rounds. In the first and in the second round each tie was played as a single leg and was held at the home ground of one of the two teams, according to the draw results. Each tie winner was qualifying to the next round. If a match was drawn, extra time was following. If extra time was drawn, there was a replay at the ground of the team who were away for the first game. If the rematch was also drawn, then extra time was following and if the match remained drawn after extra time the winner was decided by penalty shoot-out.

The next two rounds were played in a two-legged format, each team playing a home and an away match against their opponent. The team which scored more goals on aggregate, was qualifying to the next round. If the two teams scored the same number of goals on aggregate, then the team which scored more goals away from home was advancing to the next round.

If both teams had scored the same number of home and away goals, then extra time was following after the end of the second leg match. If during the extra thirty minutes both teams had managed to score, but they had scored the same number of goals, then the team who scored the away goals was advancing to the next round (i.e. the team which was playing away). If there weren't scored any goals during extra time, the qualifying team was determined by penalty shoot-out.

The final was a single match.

== First round ==
Team 1	Result	Team 2
(C) AEZ Zakakiou	1 - 2	AEK Kouklia F.C. (C)
(C) Digenis Oroklinis	2 - 0	Spartakos Kitiou (C)
(D) Ethnikos Latsion	2 - 2 (4 - 3 p.)	Elpida Xylofagou (C)
(C) ENTHOI Lakatamia FC	2 - 3	Ethnikos Assia F.C. (D)
(C) Enosis Neon Parekklisia F.C.	1 - 3	Anagennisi Germasogeias (C)
(D) Konstantios & Evripidis	1 - 0	Kissos FC Kissonergas (D)
(C) MEAP Nisou	3 - 1 (aet.)	Ayia Napa F.C. (C)
(D) Ormideia FC	2 - 0	Dynamo Pervolion (D)
(D) POL/AE Maroni	3 - 1	Achyronas Liopetriou (D)
(D) P.O. Xylotymvou 2006	3 - 2	Nikos & Sokratis Erimis (C)
(D) Finikas Ayias Marinas	2 - 0	ASPIS Pylas (D)
(C) Frenaros FC 2000	1 - 1 (2 - 3 p.)	ENAD Polis Chrysochous FC (C)

== Second round ==
4 out of the 12 teams were drawn to qualify directly to quarterfinals, without needing to play any match.

Team 1	Result	Team 2
(C) Anagennisi Germasogeias	0 - 5	Ormideia FC (D)
(D) Foinikas Ayias Marinas Chrysochous	3 - 3 (0 - 3 p.)	MEAP Nisou (C)
(D) POL/AE Maroni	1 - 3	Konstantios & Euripidis (D)
(C) AEK Kouklia F.C.	0 - 2	P.O. Xylotymvou 2006 (D)
(C) Digenis Oroklinis	bye
(D) Ethnikos Assia	bye
(D) Ethnikos Latsion	bye
(C) ENAD Polis Chrysochous	bye

== Quarter-finals ==
Team 1	Agg.	Team 2	1st leg	2nd leg
(C) ENAD Polis Chrysochous	5 - 2	P.O. Xylotymvou 2006 (D)	3 - 1	2 - 1
(D) Konstantios & Euripidis	3 - 4	Digenis Oroklinis (C)	2 - 2	1 - 2
(D) Ethnikos Latsion	0 - 9	MEAP Nisou (C)	0 - 6	0 - 3
(C) Ethnikos Assia F.C.	4 - 2	Ormideia FC (D)	2 - 2	2 - 0

== Semi-finals ==
Team 1	Agg.	Team 2	1st leg	2nd leg
(C) Ethnikos Assia F.C.	3 - 2	MEAP Nisou (C)	2 - 1	1 - 1
(C) ENAD Polis Chrysochous	4 - 2	Digenis Oroklinis (C)	3 - 0	1 - 2

== Final ==
30 March 2011

Ethnikos Assia	1 – 0	ENAD Polis Chrysochous
Bruno 25'	(Report)

GSP Stadium, Nicosia
Referee: Demetris Masias

Cypriot Cup for lower divisions 2010–11 Winners
Ethnikos Assia
1st Title

== Sources ==
- "Cyprus 2010/11". Rec.Sport.Soccer Statistics Foundation. 2015-12-03.
- Official website (in Greek)

== See also ==
- Cypriot Cup for lower divisions
- 2010–11 Cypriot Third Division
- 2010–11 Cypriot Fourth Division
