= 2010–11 Cypriot Cup =

Tournament details
- Country: Cyprus
- Dates: 10 November 2010 – 18 May 2011
- Teams: 28

Final positions
- Champions: Omonia (13th title)
- Runners-up: Apollon
- UEFA Europa League: Omonia

The 2010–11 Cypriot Cup was the 69th edition of the Cypriot Cup. A total of 28 clubs entered the competition. It began on 10 November 2010 with the first round and concluded on 18 May 2011 with the final which was held at GSZ Stadium. Omonia won their 13th Cypriot Cup trophy after beating Apollon 4–3 on penalties in the final.

== Format ==
In the 2010–11 Cypriot Cup, participated all the teams of the Cypriot First Division and the Cypriot Second Division. Teams from the two lower divisions (Third and Fourth) competed in a separate cup competition.

The competition consisted of five rounds. All rounds, except the final, were played in a two-legged format, each team playing a home and an away match against their opponent. The team which scored more goals on aggregate, was qualifying to the next round. If the two teams scored the same number of goals on aggregate, then the team which scored more goals away from home was advancing to the next round.

If both teams had scored the same number of home and away goals, then extra time was following after the end of the second leg match. If during the extra thirty minutes both teams had managed to score, but they had scored the same number of goals, then the team who scored the away goals was advancing to the next round (i.e. the team which was playing away). If there weren't scored any goals during extra time, the qualifying team was determined by penalty shoot-out.

The final was a single match.

The cup winner secured a place in the 2011–12 UEFA Europa League.

== Bracket ==
Second Round
1	APOEL	1	0	1
16	Apollon	1	2	3
8	AEP Paphos	0	1	1
9	Olympiakos	0	3	3
5	Doxa Katokopias	0	1	1
12	AEK Larnaca	1	4	5
4	Anorthosis	2	1	3
13	APEP	0	0	0
6	Enosis Neon Paralimni	0	3	3
11	Alki Larnaca	1	4	5
3	Ermis Aradippou	0	1	1
14	Ethnikos Achna	1	1	2
7	Omonia	6	2	8
10	Atromitos Yeroskipou	0	2	2
2	AEL	0	0	0
15	Aris Limassol	1	0	1

Quarter-finals
Apollon	1	3	4
Olympiakos	1	2	3
AEK Larnaca	1	1	2
Anorthosis	2	1	3
Alki Larnaca	0	2	2
Ethnikos Achna	3	0	3
Omonia	3	3	6
Aris Limassol	0	1	1

Semi-finals
Apollon	1	2	3
Anorthosis	1	1	2
Ethnikos Achna	0	1	1
Omonia (a.e.t.)	1	1	2

Final
Apollon	1 (3)
Omonia (p)	1 (4)

== First round ==
In the first round participated 13 of the 14 the teams of the Cypriot Second Division and 11 of 14 teams of the Cypriot First Division. The three first division teams and the one second division team which were qualified for 2009–10 Cypriot Cup's semifinals (Aris Limassol, AEL Limassol, APOEL and Apollon Limassol) did not participated in this round.

The Cypriot First Division teams were not drawn together and played the second leg at home. The first legs were played on November 10, 2010. The second legs were played on November 24, December 1 and 8, 2010.

Team 1	Agg.	Team 2	1st leg	2nd leg
APEP	2–2 (a)	ASIL Lysi	1–0	1–2
Chalkanoras Idaliou	0–6	Omonia	0–4	0–2
Adonis Idaliou	3–5	Ermis Aradippou	3–2	0–3
Digenis Morphou	1–3	AEK Larnaca	0–1	1–2 (a.e.t.)
Nea Salamis	0–4	Ethnikos Achna	0–2	0–2
Omonia Aradippou	0–6	Enosis Neon Paralimni	0–3	0–3
Othellos Athienou	1–6	Doxa Katokopias	1–4	0–2
Anagennisi Dherynia	1–3	Olympiakos	0–1	1–2
Atromitos Yeroskipou	4–4 (a)	APOP Kinyras	1–2	3–2 (a.e.t.)
Onisilos Sotira	0–6	Alki Larnaca	0–2	0–4
Akritas Chlorakas	0–8	Anorthosis	0–3	0–5
PAEEK	5–7	AEP Paphos	2–3	3–4

== Second round ==
In the second round participated the winners of the first round ties and the four first division teams which were qualified for 2009–10 Cypriot Cup's semifinals. The first legs were played on January 12,19,26, 2011. The second legs were played on January 19,26, February 2,16, 2011.

Team 1	Agg.	Team 2	1st leg	2nd leg
Doxa Katokopias	1–5	AEK Larnaca	0–1	1–4
Enosis Neon Paralimni	3–5	Alki Larnaca	0–1	3–4
Ermis Aradippou	1–2	Ethnikos Achna	0–1	1–1
Omonia	8–2	Atromitos Yeroskipou	6–0	2–2
APOEL	1–3	Apollon	1–1	0–2
AEL	0–1	Aris Limassol	0–1	0–0
Anorthosis	3–0	APEP	2–0	1–0
AEP Paphos	1–3	Olympiakos	0–0	1–3

== Quarter-finals ==
The first legs were played on March 9,16 2011. The second legs were played on March 16, April 6, 2011.

Team 1	Agg.	Team 2	1st leg	2nd leg
Alki Larnaca	2–3	Ethnikos Achna	0–3	2–0
AEK Larnaca	2–3	Anorthosis	1–2	1–1
Olympiakos	3–4	Apollon	1–1	2–3
Omonia	6–1	Aris Limassol	3–0	3–1

== Semi-finals ==
The first legs were played on April 20, 2011. The second legs were played on May 4, 2011.

Team 1	Agg.	Team 2	1st leg	2nd leg
Apollon	3–2	Anorthosis	1–1	2–1
Omonia	2–1	Ethnikos Achna	1–0	1–1 (a.e.t.)

== Final ==
18 May 2011
18:30 EEST

Apollon	1–1 (a.e.t.)	Omonia
Charalambous 84' (o.g.)	Report	Konstantinou 12'
Penalties
Mrdaković (penalty scored); Bangura (penalty scored); Stavrou (penalty missed); Semedo (penalty scored); Erice (penalty missed)	3–4	(penalty scored) Konstantinou; (penalty scored) Efrem; (penalty scored) Rueda; (penalty scored) Aguiar

GSZ Stadium, Larnaca
Attendance: 13,000
Referee: (Switzerland) Massimo Busacca

Apollon	Omonia

Cypriot Cup 2010-11 Winners
AC Omonia
13th title

== Sources ==
- Official website (in Greek)
- "2010/11 Cyprus Cup". Rec.Sport.Soccer Statistics Foundation. 2016-01-14.
- Papamoiseos, Stelios (2013). Από την ενοποίηση... στα αστέρια [From unification... to the stars] (in Greek). Nicosia: The writer. pp. 158–159.

== See also ==
- Cypriot Cup
- 2010–11 Cypriot First Division
- 2010–11 Cypriot Second Division
