= 2008–09 Cypriot Fourth Division =

Cypriot Fourth Division
- Season: 2008–09
- Champions: Achyronas (3rd title)
- Promoted: Achyronas; ENAD; Iraklis
- Relegated: Sourouklis; APEP; Dafni
- Matches played: 182
- Goals scored: 623 (3.42 per match)

The 2008–09 Cypriot Fourth Division was the 24th season of the Cypriot fourth-level football league. Achyronas Liopetriou won their 3rd title.

== Format ==
Fourteen teams participated in the 2008–09 Cypriot Fourth Division. All teams played against each other twice, once at their home and once away. The team with the most points at the end of the season crowned champions. The first three teams were promoted to the 2009–10 Cypriot Third Division and the last three teams were relegated to regional leagues.

=== Point system ===
Teams received three points for a win, one point for a draw and zero points for a loss.

== Changes from previous season ==
Teams promoted to 2008–09 Cypriot Third Division

- Digenis Oroklinis
- Othellos Athienou
- Orfeas Nicosia

Teams relegated from 2007–08 Cypriot Third Division

- Anagennisi Germasogeias
- ENAD Polis Chrysochous
- Iraklis Gerolakkou

Teams promoted from regional leagues

- Konstantios & Evripidis Trachoniou
- Nikos & Sokratis Erimis
- Dafni Troulloi

Teams relegated to regional leagues

- Ethnikos Latsion FC
- SEK Agiou Athanasiou
- FC Episkopi

== League standings ==
Pos	Team	Pld	W	D	L	GF	GA	GD	Pts	Promotion or relegation
1	Achyronas Liopetriou (C, P)	26	16	6	4	57	35	+22	54	Promoted to Cypriot Third Division
2	ENAD Polis Chrysochous (P)	26	15	3	8	53	34	+19	48	Promoted to Cypriot Third Division
3	Iraklis Gerolakkou (P)	26	14	4	8	52	42	+10	46	Promoted to Cypriot Third Division
4	P.O. Xylotymvou	26	13	5	8	58	37	+21	44	
5	Anagennisi Germasogeias	26	12	5	9	50	38	+12	41 (Note: Anagennisi 3p, 2–2, 1 a.; ASPIS 3p, 2–2, 0 a.)	
6	ASPIS Pylas	26	12	5	9	42	37	+5	41	
7	Nikos & Sokratis Erimis	26	11	5	10	54	46	+8	38	
8	Enosis Kokkinotrimithia	26	11	4	11	37	37	0	37	
9	Ellinismos Akakiou	26	10	5	11	47	47	0	35	
10	Konstantios & Evripidis Trachoniou	26	9	7	10	36	39	−3	34 (Note: K & E 3p, 3–2; ENP 3p, 2–3)	
11	Enosis Neon Parekklisia	26	10	4	12	35	49	−14	34	
12	Sourouklis Troullon (R)	26	7	6	13	38	53	−15	27	Relegated to regional leagues
13	APEP Pelendriou (R)	26	6	7	13	35	46	−11	25	Relegated to regional leagues
14	Dafni Troulloi (R)	26	1	4	21	29	83	−54	7	Relegated to regional leagues

Source: League standings at CFA
Rules for classification: 1) points; 2) head-to-head points; 3) head-to-head goal difference; 4) head-to-head away goals scored; 5) goal difference; 6) number of goals scored.
(C) Champions; (P) Promoted; (R) Relegated

== Results ==
Home \ Away	ANG	APP	ASP	ACR	DFN	ELN	END	ENK	ENP	IRK	KET	NSE	POX	SRK
Anagennisi		3–0	1–0	1–1	3–0	3–2	1–2	0–0	2–1	4–1	1–2	3–3	2–3	5–0
APEP	2–3		1–1	2–3	5–1	1–3	2–0	0–0	2–0	0–4	0–1	2–1	1–1	2–2
ASPIS	2–1	2–1		2–2	3–1	1–3	1–3	4–0	2–1	3–2	1–1	4–3	0–2	2–0
Achyronas	3–1	2–0	2–0		5–1	3–1	0–2	3–0	4–0	1–5	4–4	3–0	2–1	3–0
Dafni	0–2	2–2	0–3	1–2		1–2	0–5	1–4	3–0	0–3	0–1	2–5	1–1	1–4
Ellinismos	1–0	2–5	1–2	0–0	4–2		3–2	2–2	3–0	5–1	2–1	0–1	1–0	1–3
ENAD	3–3	1–2	2–1	3–0	4–1	4–2		1–0	1–1	1–2	2–0	3–0	2–2	3–1
Enosis	2–0	3–1	0–1	2–1	3–0	2–1	1–2		3–4	1–0	2–0	1–0	2–1	2–0
ENP	0–2	2–1	2–0	1–2	5–2	1–1	1–0	1–0		1–1	2–0	1–2	3–2	3–2
Iraklis	2–0	2–2	3–2	1–1	3–2	3–2	1–0	4–2	2–1		2–1	2–1	2–3	3–3
K & E	1–1	0–0	0–0	0–1	4–2	3–2	3–1	5–3	3–0	1–2		0–1	2–2	1–1
N & S	3–2	4–0	1–1	3–4	6–1	2–2	3–4	1–1	2–2	2–1	0–1		4–3	3–0
P.O. Xylotymvou	2–3	2–1	3–2	2–3	1–1	3–0	2–0	3–1	6–0	1–0	4–0	2–1		5–1
Sourouklis	2–3	1–0	1–2	2–2	3–3	1–1	1–2	1–0	1–2	2–0	3–1	1–2	2–1	

Source: Results at CFA
Legend: Blue = home team win; Yellow = draw; Red = away team win.

== See also ==
- Cypriot Fourth Division
- 2008–09 Cypriot First Division
- 2008–09 Cypriot Cup for lower divisions

== Sources ==
- Official website (in Greek)
- "2008/09 Cypriot Fourth Division". Rec.Sport.Soccer Statistics Foundation. 2016-01-14.
- "League standings" (in Greek). Cyprus Football Association. Archived from the original on August 4, 2014.
- "Results" (in Greek). Cyprus Football Association. Archived from the original on August 4, 2014.
- "Teams" (in Greek). Cyprus Football Association. Archived from the original on December 23, 2015.
