= 2009–10 Cypriot Cup for lower divisions =

Tournament details
- Country: Cyprus
- Dates: 4 November 2009 – 31 March 2010
- Teams: 23

Final positions
- Champions: Chalkanoras (1st title)
- Runners-up: AEK Kouklia

The 2009–10 Cypriot Cup for lower divisions was the 2nd edition of the Cypriot Cup for lower divisions. A total of 23 clubs entered the competition. It began on 4 November 2009 with the first round and concluded on 31 March 2010 with the final which was held at Geroskipou Municipality Stadium. Chalkanoras won their 1st cup trophy after beating AEK Kouklia 1–0 in the final.

== Format ==
Only teams from the Cypriot Third Division and Cypriot Fourth Division could participate. Participation was not compulsory. 23 of 29 participated that season.

The competition consisted of five rounds. In the first and in the second round each tie was played as a single leg and was held at the home ground of one of the two teams, according to the draw results. Each tie winner was qualifying to the next round. If a match was drawn, extra time was following. If extra time was drawn, there was a replay at the ground of the team who were away for the first game. If the rematch was also drawn, then extra time was following and if the match remained drawn after extra time the winner was decided by penalty shoot-out.

The next two rounds were played in a two-legged format, each team playing a home and an away match against their opponent. The team which scored more goals on aggregate, was qualifying to the next round. If the two teams scored the same number of goals on aggregate, then the team which scored more goals away from home was advancing to the next round.

If both teams had scored the same number of home and away goals, then extra time was following after the end of the second leg match. If during the extra thirty minutes both teams had managed to score, but they had scored the same number of goals, then the team who scored the away goals was advancing to the next round (i.e. the team which was playing away). If there weren't scored any goals during extra time, the qualifying team was determined by penalty shoot-out.

The final was a single match.

== First round ==
9 out of the 23 teams were drawn to qualify directly to the second round, without needing to play any match.

Team 1	Result	Team 2
(C) AEZ Zakakiou	4 - 1	ENTHOI Lakatamia FC (C)
(D) Anagennisi Germasogeias	1 - 4	Achyronas Liopetriou (C)
(C) Digenis Oroklinis	1 - 0	Adonis Idaliou (C)
(C) Ethnikos Assia F.C.	1 - 0	Nikos & Sokratis Erimis (D)
(C) Elpida Xylofagou	0 - 1	AEK Kouklia F.C. (C)
(D) Orfeas Nicosia	0 - 2	Ormideia FC (D)
(C) Spartakos Kitiou	3 - 3 (2 - 4 p.)	Chalkanoras Idaliou (C)
(C) Anagennisi Deryneia	bye
(D) Anagennisi Trachoniou	bye
(D) ASPIS Pylas	bye
(D) Enosis Neon Parekklisia F.C.	bye
(D) Karmiotissa Pano Polemidion	bye
(C) Kissos FC Kissonergas	bye
(D) Konstantios & Evripidis	bye
(D) Olympos Xylofagou	bye
(D) P.O. Xylotymvou 2006	bye

== Second round ==
In the second round participated the winners of the first round ties.

Team 1	Result	Team 2
(C) Anagennisi Deryneia	1 - 2	AEK Kouklia F.C. (C)
(D) ASPIS Pylas	2 - 1	Enosis Neon Parekklisia F.C. (D)
(C) Achyronas Liopetriou	0 - 1	Kissos FC Kissonergas (C)
(C) Ethnikos Assia F.C.	3 - 1 (aet.)	Olympos Xylofagou (D)
(D) Karmiotissa Pano Polemidion	1 - 4	AEZ Zakakiou (C)
(D) Ormideia FC	3 - 1	Anagennisi Trachoniou (D)
(D) P.O. Xylotymvou 2006	4 - 1	Konstantios & Evripidis Trachoniou (D)
(C) Chalkanoras Idaliou	4 - 1	Digenis Oroklinis (C)

== Quarter-finals ==
Team 1	Agg.	Team 2	1st leg	2nd leg
(C) AEZ Zakakiou	3 - 10	Kissos FC Kissonergas (C)	2 - 4	1 - 6
(C) AEK Kouklia F.C.	4 - 2	Ormideia FC (D)	3 - 0	1 - 2
(D) P.O. Xylotymvou 2006	2 - 3	ASPIS Pylas (D)	0 - 1	2 - 2
(C) Chalkanoras Idaliou	7 - 5	Ethnikos Assia F.C. (C)	5 - 2	2 - 3

== Semi-finals ==
Team 1	Agg.	Team 2	1st leg	2nd leg
(D) ASPIS Pylas	4 - 6	Chalkanoras Idaliou (C)	2 - 3	2 - 3
(C) Kissos FC Kissonergas	2 - 3	AEK Kouklia F.C. (C)	0 - 2	2 - 1

== Final ==
31 March 2010

Chalkanoras Idaliou	1 – 0	AEK Kouklia
Tavrou 27'	(Report)

Geroskipou Municipality Stadium, Geroskipou
Referee: Antonis Christodoulou

Cypriot Cup for lower divisions 2009–10 Winners
Chalkanoras Idaliou
1st Title

== Sources ==
- "Cyprus 2009/10". Rec.Sport.Soccer Statistics Foundation. 2016-01-14.
- Official website (in Greek)

== See also ==
- Cypriot Cup for lower divisions
- 2009–10 Cypriot Third Division
- 2009–10 Cypriot Fourth Division
