= 2010–11 Cypriot Fourth Division =

Cypriot Fourth Division
- Season: 2010–11
- Champions: Ormideia (1st title)
- Promoted: Ormideia; POL/AEM; Achyronas
- Relegated: Anagennisi; ASPIS; Enosis K.
- Matches played: 182
- Goals scored: 528 (2.9 per match)
- Top goalscorer: Giorgos Nicolaou (23 goals)

The 2010–11 Cypriot Fourth Division was the 26th season of the Cypriot fourth-level football league. Ormideia FC won their 1st title.

== Format ==
Fourteen teams participated in the 2010–11 Cypriot Fourth Division. All teams played against each other twice, once at their home and once away. The team with the most points at the end of the season were crowned champions. The first three teams were promoted to the 2011–12 Cypriot Third Division and the last three teams were relegated to regional leagues.

=== Point system ===
Teams received three points for a win, one point for a draw and zero points for a loss.

== Changes from previous season ==
Teams promoted to 2010–11 Cypriot Third Division

- Enosis Neon Parekklisia
- Nikos & Sokratis Erimis
- Anagennisi Germasogeias

Teams relegated from 2009–10 Cypriot Third Division

- THOI Lakatamia
- Kissos Kissonergas
- Achyronas Liopetriou

Teams promoted from regional leagues

- POL/AE Maroni
- Dynamo Pervolion
- Finikas Ayias Marinas Chrysochous

Teams relegated to regional leagues

- Orfeas Nicosia
- Ellinismos Akakiou
- Olympos Xylofagou
- AEK Kythreas

== Stadia and locations ==
2010–11 Cypriot Fourth Division

Club	Venue
Anagennisi Trachoniou	Trachoni Municipal Stadium
ASPIS Pylas	Pyla Municipal Stadium
Achyronas Liopetriou	Liopetri Municipal Stadium
Dynamo Pervolion	Pervolia Municipal Stadium
Ethnikos Latsion FC	Pervolia Municipal Stadium
Enosis Kokkinotrimithia	Kokkinotrimithia Municipal Stadium
THOI Lakatamia	EN THOI Stadium
Karmiotissa Pano Polemidion	Pano Polemidia Municipal Stadium
Kissos Kissonergas	Kissonerga Municipal Stadium
Konstantios & Evripidis Trachoniou	Trachoni Municipal Stadium
P.O. Xylotymvou	Xylotympou Municipal Stadium
Ormideia FC	Ormideia Municipal Stadium
POL/AE Maroni	Maroni Municipal Stadium
Finikas Ayias Marinas	Evripides Municipal Stadium

== League standings ==
Pos	Team	Pld	W	D	L	GF	GA	GD	Pts	Promotion or relegation
1	Ormideia FC (C, P)	26	17	7	2	52	24	+28	58	Promoted to Cypriot Third Division
2	POL/AE Maroni (P)	26	17	5	4	52	27	+25	56	Promoted to Cypriot Third Division
3	Achyronas Liopetriou (P)	26	12	9	5	35	21	+14	45	Promoted to Cypriot Third Division
4	Karmiotissa Pano Polemidion	26	13	5	8	49	36	+13	44	
5	THOI Lakatamia	26	12	4	10	41	39	+2	40	
6	P.O. Xylotymvou	26	10	8	8	42	37	+5	38	
7	Kissos Kissonergas	26	11	3	12	40	44	−4	36	
8	Ethnikos Latsion FC	26	9	5	12	24	37	−13	32 (Note: Ethnikos 8p, 5–3; Dinamo 4p, 6–6; K & E 4p, 4–6)	
9	Dynamo Pervolion	26	8	8	10	44	41	+3	32	
10	Konstantios & Evripidis Trachoniou	26	9	5	12	35	35	0	32	
11	Finikas Ayias Marinas Chrysochous	26	8	7	11	37	42	−5	31	
12	Anagennisi Trachoniou (R)	26	6	8	12	31	45	−14	26 (Note: Anagennisi 3p, 4–2; ASPIS 3P, 2–4)	Relegated to regional leagues
13	ASPIS Pylas (R)	26	7	5	14	25	41	−16	26	Relegated to regional leagues
14	Enosis Kokkinotrimithia (R)	26	2	3	21	21	59	−38	9	Relegated to regional leagues

Source: League standings at CFA
Rules for classification: 1) points; 2) head-to-head points; 3) head-to-head goal difference; 4) head-to-head away goals scored; 5) goal difference; 6) number of goals scored.
(C) Champions; (P) Promoted; (R) Relegated

== Results ==
Home \ Away	ANG	ASP	ACR	DNM	THL	ETL	ENK	KRM	KSS	KET	POX	ORM	POL	FNK
Anagennisi T.		3–0	0–0	2–2	0–2	2–0	2–2	4–4	2–1	0–1	1–2	3–1	1–3	1–0
ASPIS	2–1		0–1	0–0	0–2	1–2	1–0	0–1	1–0	3–2	3–2	1–3	3–3	3–2
Achyronas	2–0	1–0		2–1	3–1	2–0	1–2	2–2	0–0	1–0	2–1	1–1	4–1	0–0
Dynamo	5–0	1–0	2–0		2–3	1–1	3–2	3–2	3–0	3–1	1–3	1–1	1–1	1–2
THOI	3–0	2–0	3–1	2–2		1–0	3–1	1–2	2–2	1–4	1–0	0–2	3–1	1–1
Ethnikos	3–0 (Note: The match between Ethnikos Latsion and Anagennisi Trachoniou was interrupted at 2–0; It was awarded 3–0 to Ethnikos.)	0–1	0–3 (Note: The match between Ethnikos Latsion and Achyronas Liopetriou was interrupted at 1–3; It was awarded 0–3 to Achyronas.)	2–1	1–0		3–2	0–2	0–1	2–1	2–2	1–2	1–1	1–0
Enosis	0–1	0–0	0–3	1–3	1–2	0–1		2–1	2–4	1–1	1–2	0–2	0–2	0–2
Karmiotissa	1–0	3–1	0–0	1–1	3–2	5–0	3–1		2–1	2–1	2–1	0–1	2–3	3–0
Kissos	2–1	2–1	1–0	2–0	2–2	5–1	4–0	3–1		0–1	1–0	1–3	1–5	3–2
K & E	0–0	0–0	1–3	2–1	2–1	0–0	3–1	1–3	4–1		4–2	0–1	2–3	1–2
P.O. Xylotymvou	2–2	4–1	1–1	2–1	0–1	1–1	2–1	3–1	2–0	1–0		1–1	0–0	4–1
Ormideia FC	2–2	2–0	1–1	4–2	5–1	1–0	6–1	2–1	1–0	1–1	2–2		2–1	3–1
POL/AEM	3–1	2–1	2–0	3–1	1–0	2–1	2–0	0–0	3–0	2–0	5–1	1–0		1–2
Finikas	2–2	2–2	1–1	2–2	3–1	0–1	2–0	3–2	5–3	0–2	1–1	1–2	0–1	

Source: Results at CFA
Legend: Blue = home team win; Yellow = draw; Red = away team win.

== See also ==
- Cypriot Fourth Division
- 2010–11 Cypriot First Division
- 2010–11 Cypriot Cup for lower divisions
- Cypriot football league system

== Sources ==
- Official website (in Greek)
- "2010/11 Cypriot Fourth Division". Rec.Sport.Soccer Statistics Foundation. 2016-01-14.
- "League standings" (in Greek). Cyprus Football Association. Archived from the original on 2015-12-24.
- "Results" (in Greek). Cyprus Football Association. Archived from the original on 2015-12-24.
- "Teams" (in Greek). Cyprus Football Association. Archived from the original on 2015-12-24.
- "Scorers" (in Greek). Cyprus Football Association. Archived from the original on 2015-12-24.
