= 2009–10 Cypriot Cup =

Tournament details
- Country: Cyprus
- Dates: 23 September 2009 – 15 May 2010
- Teams: 28

Final positions
- Champions: Apollon (6th title)
- Runners-up: APOEL

The 2009–10 Cypriot Cup was the 68th edition of the Cypriot Cup. A total of 28 clubs entered the competition. It began on 23 September 2009 with the first round and concluded on 15 May 2010 with the final which was held at GSZ Stadium. Apollon won their 6th Cypriot Cup trophy after beating APOEL 2–1 in the final.

== Format ==
In the 2009–10 Cypriot Cup, participated all the teams of the Cypriot First Division and the Cypriot Second Division. Teams from the two lower divisions (Third and Fourth) competed in a separate cup competition.

The competition consisted of five rounds. All rounds, except the final, were played in a two-legged format, each team playing a home and an away match against their opponent. The team which scored more goals on aggregate, was qualifying to the next round. If the two teams scored the same number of goals on aggregate, then the team which scored more goals away from home was advancing to the next round.

If both teams had scored the same number of home and away goals, then extra time was following after the end of the second leg match. If during the extra thirty minutes both teams had managed to score, but they had scored the same number of goals, then the team who scored the away goals was advancing to the next round (i.e. the team which was playing away). If there weren't scored any goals during extra time, the qualifying team was determined by penalty shoot-out.

The final was a single match.

The cup winner secured a place in the 2010–11 UEFA Europa League.

== Bracket ==
Second Round
1	APOEL (a.e.t.)	0	4	4
16	Ethnikos Achna	2	0	2
8	Ermis Aradippou	4	0	4
9	Enosis Neon Paralimni	0	2	2
5	Aris Limassol	0	1	1
12	AEK Larnaca	0	0	0
4	APOP Kinyras	4	2	6
13	AE Paphos	1	4	5
6	APEP	1	1	2
11	Doxa Katokopias	1	0	1
3	AEL	0	2	2
14	Omonia	1	0	1
7	Nea Salamis	1	0	1
10	Apollon	0	2	2
2	Anorthosis	6	1	7
15	AO Ayia Napa	0	2	2

Quarter-finals
APOEL	5	1	6
Ermis Aradippou	0	0	0
Aris Limassol	1	1	2
APOP Kinyras	1	0	1
APEP	0	0	0
AEL	0	2	2
Apollon	3	3	6
Anorthosis	1	2	3

Semi-finals
APOEL	0	2	2
Aris Limassol	0	0	0
AEL	0	0	0
Apollon	1	1	2

Final
APOEL	1
Apollon	2

== First round ==
In the first round participated all the teams of the Cypriot Second Division and 10 of 14 teams of the Cypriot First Division. The four first division teams which were qualified for 2008–09 Cypriot Cup's semifinals (APOP Kinyras, AEL Limassol, APOEL and Apollon Limassol) did not participated in this round. The Cypriot First Division teams were not drawn together and played the second leg at home.

The draw for the first round took place on 1 September 2009. The first legs were played on 23 and 30 September 2009. The second legs were played on 30 September and 21, 28 October 2009.

Team 1	Agg.	Team 2	1st leg	2nd leg
Othellos	1–8	Anorthosis	0–3	1–5
Digenis Morphou	1–2	Nea Salamis	1–1	0–1
Olympiakos	2–8	Omonia	1–3	1–5
Omonia Aradippou	1–7	AE Paphos	1–0	0–7
ASIL Lysi	2–4	APEP	0–3	2–1
MEAP Nisou	1–2	Doxa Katokopias	0–2	1–0
Alki Larnaca	1–1 (a)	Ethnikos Achnas	1–1	0–0
Atromitos Yeroskipou	2–6	Ermis Aradippou	2–2	0–4
Onisilos Sotira	1–3	Aris Limassol	1–2	0–1
Akritas Chlorakas	0–3	Enosis Neon Paralimni	0–0	0–3
AO Ayia Napa	2–0	PAEEK FC	2–0	0–0
Frenaros FC	2–5	AEK Larnaca	2–2	0–3

== Second round ==
Teams that qualified for last year's semifinals entered in this round, along with the 12 winners of the previous round. The draw for the second round took place on 17 November 2009. The first leg matched were played on 25 November 2009 and the second legs on 16 December 2009.

Team 1	Agg.	Team 2	1st leg	2nd leg
Ermis Aradippou	4–2	Enosis Neon Paralimni	4–0	0–2
Nea Salamis	1–2	Apollon	1–0	0–2
Anorthosis	7–2	AO Ayia Napa	6–0	1–2
APOP Kinyras	6–5	AE Paphos	4–1	2–4
Aris Limassol	1–0	AEK Larnaca	0–0	1–0
APEP	2–1	Doxa Katokopias	1–1	1–0
AEL	2–1	Omonia	0–1	2–0
APOEL	4–2	Ethnikos Achna	0–2	4–0 (a.e.t.)

== Quarter-finals ==
The first legs for the quarterfinals were played on 27 January and on 2, 3 and 10 February 2010. The second legs were played on 10 and 17 February 2010.

Team 1	Agg.	Team 2	1st leg	2nd leg
APEP	0–2	AEL	0–0	0–2
Aris Limassol	2–1	APOP Kinyras	1–1	1–0
APOEL	6–0	Ermis Aradippou	5–0	1–0
Apollon	6–3	Anorthosis	3–1	3–2

== Semi-finals ==
The first legs were played on 14 April 2010 and the second legs on 27 and 28 April 2010.

Team 1	Agg.	Team 2	1st leg	2nd leg
APOEL	2–0	Aris Limassol	0–0	2–0
AEL	0–2	Apollon	0–1	0–1

== Final ==
15 May 2010
19:00 EEST

Apollon	2–1	APOEL
Bangura 1'; Merkis 71'	Report	Żewłakow 23'

GSZ Stadium, Larnaca
Attendance: 12,000
Referee: (Italy) Roberto Rosetti

Cypriot Cup 2009-10 Winners
Apollon Limassol
6th Title

== Sources ==
- Official website (in Greek)
- "2009/10 Cyprus Cup". Rec.Sport.Soccer Statistics Foundation. 2016-01-14.
- Papamoiseos, Stelios (2013). Από την ενοποίηση... στα αστέρια [From unification... to the stars] (in Greek). Nicosia: The writer. pp. 154–155.

== See also ==
- Cypriot Cup
- 2009–10 Cypriot First Division
- 2009–10 Cypriot Second Division
