= Andreas Anastasiou =

Cypriot footballer (born 1995)

Personal information
- Full name: Andreas Anastasiou
- Date of birth: 13 June 1995 (age 31)
- Place of birth: Larnaca, Cyprus
- Position: Forward

Team information
- Current team: Digenis Oroklinis
- Number: 9

Youth career
- 2006–2011: P.O. Xylotymbou

Senior career*
Years	Team	Apps	(Gls)
2011–2014	Alki	12	(1)
2014–2015	ASIL Lysi	9	(5)
2015–2016	P.O. Xylotymbou	28	(2)
2016–	Digenis Oroklinis	36	(22)
- * Club domestic league appearances and goals as of 4 November 2017

Andreas Anastasiou (born 13 June 1995 in Larnaca) is a Cypriot football forward who currently plays for Digenis Oroklinis. He started his career at P.O. Xylotymbou but in 2011 took a transfer to Cypriot First Division club, Alki Larnaca.

== Honors ==
=== Individual ===
- Cypriot Third Division Top goalscorer: 2016–17 (22 Goals)
