= 2010–11 Cypriot Third Division =

Cypriot Third Division
- Season: 2010–11
- Champions: Ethnikos (1st title)
- Promoted: Ethnikos; EN Parekklisia; Ayia Napa
- Relegated: Digenis Or. MEAP; Iraklis
- Matches played: 182
- Goals scored: 475 (2.61 per match)
- Top goalscorer: Dinah Diawara (13 goals); Tiago Rosado (13 goals); Nikos Panagidis (13 goals)

The 2010–11 Cypriot Third Division was the 40th season of the Cypriot third-level football league. Ethnikos Assia won their 1st title.

== Format ==
Fourteen teams participated in the 2010–11 Cypriot Third Division. All teams played against each other twice, once at their home and once away. The team with the most points at the end of the season crowned champions. The first three teams were promoted to the 2011–12 Cypriot Second Division and the last three teams were relegated to the 2011–12 Cypriot Fourth Division.

=== Point system ===
Teams received three points for a win, one point for a draw and zero points for a loss.

== Changes from previous season ==
Teams promoted to 2010–11 Cypriot Second Division

- Chalkanoras Idaliou
- Anagennisi Deryneia
- Adonis Idaliou

Teams relegated from 2009–10 Cypriot Second Division

- Frenaros FC
- Ayia Napa
- MEAP Nisou

Teams promoted from 2009–10 Cypriot Fourth Division

- Enosis Neon Parekklisia
- Nikos & Sokratis Erimis
- Anagennisi Germasogeias

Teams relegated to 2010–11 Cypriot Fourth Division

- THOI Lakatamia
- Kissos Kissonergas
- Achyronas Liopetriou

== Stadia and locations ==
2010–11 Cypriot Third Division

Club	Venue
Ayia Napa	Ayia Napa Municipal Stadium
AEZ	Zakaki Municipal Stadium
AEK	Chloraka Municipal Stadium
Anagennisi G.	Germasogeia Municipal Stadium
Digenis Or.	Oroklini Municipal Stadium
Elpida	Michalonikion Stadium
Ethnikos	Makario Stadium
ENAD	Poli Chrysochous Municipal Stadium
EN Parekklisia	Parekklisia Municipal Stadium
Iraklis	Kykkos Stadium
MEAP	Theodorio Koinotiko
Nikos & Sokratis	Erimi Municipal Stadium
Spartakos	Kiti Municipal Stadium
Frenaros	Frenaros Municipal Stadium

== League standings ==
Pos	Team	Pld	W	D	L	GF	GA	GD	Pts	Promotion or relegation
1	Ethnikos Assia (C, P)	26	15	7	4	43	23	+20	52	Promoted to Cypriot Second Division
2	Enosis Neon Parekklisia (P)	26	13	9	4	49	29	+20	48	Promoted to Cypriot Second Division
3	Ayia Napa (P)	26	12	11	3	39	14	+25	47 (Note: Ayia Napa 4p; ENAD 1p)	Promoted to Cypriot Second Division
4	ENAD Polis Chrysochous	26	13	8	5	36	24	+12	47	
5	Spartakos Kitiou	26	11	7	8	38	33	+5	40	
6	AEK Kouklia	26	11	6	9	32	36	−4	39	
7	Frenaros FC	26	7	13	6	28	23	+5	34	
8	AEZ Zakakiou	26	9	6	11	35	46	−11	33	
9	Anagennisi Germasogeias	26	8	7	11	31	38	−7	31	
10	Nikos & Sokratis Erimis	26	7	8	11	33	41	−8	29 (Note: Nikos & Sokratis 4p; Elpida 1p)	
11	Elpida Xylofagou	26	7	8	11	25	34	−9	29	
12	Digenis Oroklinis (R)	26	5	9	12	31	41	−10	24	Relegated to Cypriot Fourth Division
13	MEAP Nisou (R)	26	5	6	15	31	44	−13	21	Relegated to Cypriot Fourth Division
14	Iraklis Gerolakkou (R)	26	4	5	17	24	49	−25	17	Relegated to Cypriot Fourth Division

Source: League standings at CFA
Rules for classification: 1) points; 2) head-to-head points; 3) head-to-head goal difference; 4) head-to-head away goals scored; 5) goal difference; 6) number of goals scored.
(C) Champions; (P) Promoted; (R) Relegated

== Results ==
Home \ Away	ANP	AEZ	AEK	ANG	DGN	ETN	ELP	END	ENP	IRK	MPN	NSE	SPR	FRN
Ayia Napa		1–0	8–0	3–0	0–0	0–0	1–1	1–0	3–1	4–0	2–0	2–0	1–1	0–0
AEZ	1–0		3–2	3–0	3–1	2–2	2–1	1–1	1–1	3–1	1–0	2–2	3–2	2–1
AEK	0–2	3–0		0–0	2–0	1–3	3–1	1–0	1–1	2–1	1–1	2–1	1–2	0–1
Anagennisi	3–0	1–1	0–1		1–3	0–1	1–0	0–2	0–2	3–3	3–2	3–1	1–1	1–1
Digenis	1–1	1–0	2–2	3–6		2–2	1–2	2–3	1–1	2–0	3–0	0–1	1–0	1–1
Ethnikos	1–2	3–0	2–0	0–1	2–1		2–2	3–0	0–0	3–0	2–4	3–2	2–2	1–0
Elpida	1–2	3–0	1–0	1–0	2–1	0–1		0–0	1–2	2–0	1–1	0–0	0–2	0–0
ENAD	0–0	2–0	2–0	2–0	2–2	1–1	3–1		2–2	4–2	2–1	2–0	2–1	2–0
ENP	1–1	5–3	2–3	3–1	2–0	3–1	5–0	1–1		3–0	2–1	2–1	1–1	1–1
Iraklis	1–1	2–1	0–1	0–1	1–1	0–1	1–0	1–2	1–2		4–3	2–0	0–1	1–1
MEAP	0–3	4–0	1–2	2–2	1–0	0–1	2–2	0–1	0–2	3–0		0–2	1–1	1–1
Nikos & Sokratis	0–0	1–1	2–2	1–1	3–1	0–3	2–0	1–0	0–1	4–3	3–1		4–5	1–1
Spartakos	1–0	3–1	0–0	0–2	2–0	0–2	0–1	3–0	3–2	0–0	0–2	4–1		3–1
Frenaros FC	1–1	3–1	0–2	2–0	1–1	0–1	2–2	0–0	2–1	1–0	3–0	0–0	4–0	

Source: Results at CFA
Legend: Blue = home team win; Yellow = draw; Red = away team win.

== See also ==
- Cypriot Third Division
- 2010–11 Cypriot First Division
- 2010–11 Cypriot Cup for lower divisions

== Sources ==
- "2010/11 Cypriot Third Division". Rec.Sport.Soccer Statistics Foundation. 2016-01-14.
- "League standings" (in Greek). Cyprus Football Association. Archived from the original on 2014-07-29.
- "Results" (in Greek). Cyprus Football Association. Archived from the original on 2017-11-15.
- "Teams" (in Greek). Cyprus Football Association. Archived from the original on 2015-12-21.
- "Scorers" (in Greek). Cyprus Football Association. Archived from the original on 2015-12-21.
