= 2013–14 Cypriot Second Division =

Cypriot Second Division
- Season: 2013–14
- Champions: B1: Ayia Napa (2nd title); B2: Karmiotissa (1st title)
- Promoted: B1: Ayia Napa; Othellos; B2: Karmiotissa; EN Parekklisia
- Relegated: B1: Nikos & Sokratis; Olympiakos; APEP; AEP; B2: PAEEK; ASIL; Chalkanoras; Onisilos

The 2013–14 Cypriot Second Division was the 59th season of the Cypriot second-level football league. It began on 14 September 2013 and ended on 12 May 2014. There was a new league system in place with the league being split into a two tier system, Divisions B1 and B2. The first two teams of B1 Division were promoted to Cypriot First Division and the last four teams were relegated to B2 Division. The last four teams of the 2013–14 Cypriot First Division were relegated to 2013–14 B1 Division, meaning the First Division would drop in size by two teams (12 teams in total).

== Team Changes from 2012–13 ==
Teams promoted to 2013–14 Cypriot First Division

- Aris Limassol
- Ermis Aradippou
- AEK Kouklia

Teams relegated from 2012–13 Cypriot First Division to 2013–14 B1 Division

- Ayia Napa
- AEP Paphos
- Olympiakos Nicosia

Teams relegated from 2012–13 Cypriot Second Division to 2013–14 B2 Division

- PAEEK
- AEZ Zakakiou
- Onisilos Sotira
- Chalkanoras

Teams relegated from 2012–13 Cypriot Second Division to 2013–14 Cypriot Third Division

- Akritas Chlorakas
- Ethnikos Assia

Teams promoted from 2012 to 2013 Cypriot Third Division to 2013–14 B2 Division

- Karmiotissa Polemidion
- EN Parekklisia
- Digenis Voroklinis
- ASIL Lysi

== Stadia and locations ==
=== B1 Division ===
Location of clubs in 2013–14 Cypriot Second Division B1

Note: Table lists clubs in alphabetical order.

Club	Location	Venue	Capacity
Anagennisi	Deryneia, Famagusta	Anagennisi Football Ground	5,800
APEP	Kyperounta, Limassol District	Kyperounda Stadium	6,000
Ayia Napa	Ayia Napa	Municipal Stadium	2,000
Nikos & Sokratis	Erimi, Limassol	Erimi Community Stadium	1,000
Olympiakos	Nicosia	Makario Stadium	16,000
Omonia Ar.	Aradippou	Aradippou Stadium	4,500
Othellos	Athienou, Larnaca	Othellos Athienou Stadium	2,500
AEP Paphos	Paphos	Pafiako Stadium	9,394

=== B2 Division ===
Location of clubs in 2013–14 Cypriot Second Division B2

Note: Table lists clubs in alphabetical order.

Club	Location	Venue	Capacity
AEZ	Zakaki, Limassol	Zakaki Municipal Stadium	2,000
ASIL	Larnaca	Grigoris Afxentiou	2,000
Chalkanoras	Dali	Chalkanoras Stadium	2,000
Digenis V.	Oroklini	Koinotiko Stadio Oroklinis	1,500
EN Parekklisia	Parekklisia	Parekklisias Stadium	3,000
Karmiotissa	Pano Polemidia	Pano Polemidia Municipal Stadium	1,500
Onisilos	Sotira	Koinotiko Sotiras	2,000
PAEEK	Lakatamia	Keryneia Epistrophi	2,000

== League table ==
=== B1 Division ===
Pos	Team	Pld	W	D	L	GF	GA	GD	Pts	Promotion or relegation
1	Ayia Napa (C, P)	28	19	6	3	58	29	+29	63	Promoted to Cypriot First Division
2	Othellos Athienou (P)	28	17	4	7	55	25	+30	55	Promoted to Cypriot First Division
3	Anagennisi Deryneia	28	16	3	9	67	36	+31	51	
4	Omonia Aradippou	28	13	6	9	41	33	+8	45	
5	Nikos & Sokratis Erimis (R)	28	10	3	15	48	49	−1	33	Relegated to Cypriot B2 Division
6	Olympiakos Nicosia (Note: Olympiakos deducted 6 points) (R)	28	9	2	17	36	43	−7	23	Relegated to Cypriot B2 Division
7	APEP (Note: APEP deducted 3 points) (R)	28	6	4	18	22	61	−39	19	Relegated to Cypriot B2 Division
8	AEP Paphos (Note: Paphos deducted 30 points) (R)	28	6	4	18	24	75	−51	−8	Relegated to Cypriot B2 Division

Source: Soccerway
Rules for classification: 1) points; 2) head-to-head points; 3) head-to-head goal difference; 4) head-to-head away goals scored; 5) goal difference; 6) number of goals scored
(C) Champions; (P) Promoted; (R) Relegated

=== B2 Division ===
Pos	Team	Pld	W	D	L	GF	GA	GD	Pts	Promotion or relegation
1	Karmiotissa (C, P)	28	17	7	4	55	23	+32	58	Promoted to Cypriot B1 Division
2	Enosis Neon Parekklisia (P)	28	13	8	7	41	33	+8	47	Promoted to Cypriot B1 Division
3	AEZ Zakakiou	28	13	8	7	38	26	+12	47	
4	Digenis Oroklinis	28	11	7	10	28	29	−1	40	
5	PAEEK (R)	28	10	8	10	34	28	+6	38	Relegated to Cypriot Third Division
6	ASIL Lysi (R)	28	10	3	15	28	38	−10	33	Relegated to Cypriot Third Division
7	Chalkanoras Idaliou (R)	28	9	5	14	39	37	+2	32	Relegated to Cypriot Third Division
8	Onisilos (R)	28	3	6	19	13	62	−49	15	Relegated to Cypriot Third Division

Source: Soccerway
Rules for classification: 1) points; 2) head-to-head points; 3) head-to-head goal difference; 4) head-to-head away goals scored; 5) goal difference; 6) number of goals scored
(C) Champions; (P) Promoted; (R) Relegated

== Sources ==
- "2013/14 Cypriot Second Division". Rec.Sport.Soccer Statistics Foundation. 2016-01-14.
