= 2008–09 Cypriot Third Division =

Cypriot Third Division
- Season: 2008–09
- Champions: Akritas (2nd title)
- Promoted: Akritas; Frenaros; Othellos
- Relegated: Anagennisi Tr. Orfeas; Olympos
- Matches played: 182
- Goals scored: 519 (2.85 per match)
- Top goalscorer: Marios Thoma (17 goals)

The 2008–09 Cypriot Third Division was the 38th season of the Cypriot third-level football league. Akritas Chlorakas won their 2nd title.

== Format ==
Fourteen teams participated in the 2008–09 Cypriot Third Division. All teams played against each other twice, once at their home and once away. The team with the most points at the end of the season crowned champions. The first three teams were promoted to the 2009–10 Cypriot Second Division and the last three teams were relegated to the 2009–10 Cypriot Fourth Division.

=== Point system ===
Teams received three points for a win, one point for a draw and zero points for a loss.

== Changes from previous season ==
Teams promoted to 2008–09 Cypriot Second Division

- PAEEK FC
- Ethnikos Assia
- Chalkanoras Idaliou

Teams relegated from 2007–08 Cypriot Second Division

- Anagennisi Deryneia
- Akritas Chlorakas
- Olympos Xylofagou

Teams promoted from 2007–08 Cypriot Fourth Division

- Digenis Oroklinis
- Othellos
- Orfeas Nicosia

Teams relegated to 2008–09 Cypriot Fourth Division

- Anagennisi Germasogeias
- ENAD Polis Chrysochous
- Iraklis Gerolakkou

== League standings ==
Pos	Team	Pld	W	D	L	GF	GA	GD	Pts	Promotion or relegation
1	Akritas Chlorakas (C, P)	26	16	6	4	46	23	+23	54	Promoted to Cypriot Second Division
2	Frenaros FC (P)	26	14	6	6	51	28	+23	48	Promoted to Cypriot Second Division
3	Othellos Athienou (P)	26	13	7	6	34	22	+12	46	Promoted to Cypriot Second Division
4	Digenis Oroklinis	26	10	9	7	36	32	+4	39 (Note: Digenis 3p, 5–4; AEZ 3p, 4–5)	
5	AEZ Zakakiou	26	11	6	9	42	35	+7	39	
6	Kissos Kissonergas	26	11	5	10	36	38	−2	38 (Note: Kissos FC 6p; AEK 0p)	
7	AEK Kouklia	26	11	5	10	33	27	+6	38	
8	Spartakos Kitiou	26	10	7	9	48	37	+11	37	
9	Adonis Idaliou	26	10	6	10	39	31	+8	36	
10	Elpida Xylofagou	26	8	9	9	34	40	−6	33	
11	Anagennisi Deryneia	26	8	8	10	32	35	−3	32	
12	Anagennisi Trachoniou (R)	26	9	4	13	38	51	−13	31	Relegated to Cypriot Fourth Division
13	Orfeas Nicosia (R)	26	7	4	15	24	44	−20	25	Relegated to Cypriot Fourth Division
14	Olympos Xylofagou (R)	26	1	4	21	26	76	−50	7	Relegated to Cypriot Fourth Division

Source: League standings at CFA
Rules for classification: 1) points; 2) head-to-head points; 3) head-to-head goal difference; 4) head-to-head away goals scored; 5) goal difference; 6) number of goals scored.
(C) Champions; (P) Promoted; (R) Relegated

== Results ==
Home \ Away	ADN	AEZ	AEK	AKR	AND	ANT	DGN	ELP	KSS	OTL	OLM	ORF	SPR	FRN
Adonis		0–2	1–1	0–1	2–0	2–2	0–1	3–2	0–0	3–0	4–0	1–2	1–1	1–1
AEZ	3–0		2–3	2–0	0–4	0–0	4–0	3–0	1–0	3–2	1–1	1–0	3–0	1–1
AEK	0–0	0–0		1–0	1–0	0–2	3–1	3–0	1–2	1–2	3–1	0–1	2–1	2–3
Akritas	2–0	3–0	1–0		1–2	5–3	1–0	5–0	1–0	1–1	3–1	1–0	1–1	1–0
Anagennisi D.	0–2	1–1	1–3	1–1		3–2	1–1	0–0	2–0	1–0	3–2	2–0	2–2	0–1
Anagennisi T.	1–5	1–4	1–1	2–2	1–0		2–1	2–5	1–0	1–3	1–0	4–1	1–2	3–2
Digenis	1–0	5–0	1–3	1–1	1–1	2–1		1–1	1–1	1–0	6–2	4–0	3–1	1–0
Elpida	3–1	0–0	1–2	0–3	2–1	2–1	1–1		5–2	1–0	3–1	3–0	1–2	0–0
Kissos	0–4	2–1	2–1	5–1	1–1	2–0	0–0	2–0		1–0	1–2	3–2	4–1	1–1
Othellos	2–0	2–1	1–0	0–0	2–1	3–1	0–0	3–0	3–1		3–1	1–0	2–2	2–1
Olympos	0–2	1–5	0–1	1–5	0–3	0–2	2–2	3–3	2–4	0–1		1–2	1–1	0–2
Orfeas	0–1	2–1	0–0	1–2	0–0	4–1	0–1	0–0	1–2	0–0	5–1		1–0	1–5
Spartakos	2–4	4–1	1–0	0–2	4–1	1–2	5–0	0–0	1–0	0–0	6–3	6–0		4–1
Frenaros FC	4–2	3–2	2–1	1–2	5–1	1–0	2–0	1–1	5–0	1–1	4–0	3–1	1–0	

Source: Results at CFA
Legend: Blue = home team win; Yellow = draw; Red = away team win.

== See also ==
- Cypriot Third Division
- 2008–09 Cypriot First Division
- 2008–09 Cypriot Cup for lower divisions

== Sources ==
- "2008/09 Cypriot Third Division". Rec.Sport.Soccer Statistics Foundation. 2016-01-14.
- "League standings" (in Greek). Cyprus Football Association. Archived from the original on 2017-10-17.
- "Results" (in Greek). Cyprus Football Association. Archived from the original on 2014-07-29.
- "Teams" (in Greek). Cyprus Football Association. Archived from the original on 2015-12-21.
- "Scorers" (in Greek). Cyprus Football Association. Archived from the original on 2015-12-21.
