= Andreas Kyprianou =

Cypriot footballer (born 1988)

Personal information
- Full name: Andreas Kyprianou
- Date of birth: December 5, 1988 (age 37)
- Place of birth: Larnaca, Cyprus
- Height: 1.79 m (5 ft 10 1/2 in)
- Position: Striker

Team information
- Current team: Alki Larnaca 1948

Senior career*
Years	Team	Apps	(Gls)
2007–2010	Nea Salamina	39	(5)
2010	Anorthosis	0	(0)
2011	Ionikos	3	(0)
2011–2012	Omonia Aradippou	23	(13)
2012–2013	Aris Limassol	19	(11)
2013–2014	Anagennisi Deryneia	23	(19)
2014–2015	Enosis Neon Paralimniou	0	(0)
2015–2017	Anagennisi Deryneia	29	(23)
2017–2018	Nea Salamina	17	(2)
2018–2019	Ethnikos Achna	15	(4)
2019–2020	Othellos Athienou	19	(13)
2020–2021	Digenis Akritas Morphou	31	(9)
2021–2022	Omonia Aradippou	12	(2)
2022–2023	Spartakos Kitiou	36	(27)
2024–	Alki Larnaca 1948		

International career
2008–2011	Cyprus U-21		
- * Club domestic league appearances and goals as of 21:32, 25 December 2024 (UTC)

Andreas Kyprianou (Greek: Ανδρέας Κυπριανού; born December 5, 1988) is a football striker, who plays for Alki Larnaca.

== Career ==
Born in Larnaca, Kyprianou began playing youth football with Nea Salamina Famagusta FC at age 10. He was promoted to the first team and made 39 league appearances, scoring five goals, for the club.

He was signed by Anorthosis at age 21 in June 2010. He made his official debut with Anorthosis on December 1, 2010, in a cup match against Akritas. On January 25, 2011, he moved to Greece and signed a contract with Ionikos F.C. In June 2011, he moved to Omonia Aradippou and he became the top scorer in the 2011–12 Cypriot Second Division by scoring 13 goals in 23 appearances. Next season (2012–13) Kyprianou scored 11 goals in playing in 19 matches.

In 2013–14 he moved to Anagennisi Dherynia again in the second division where he was the second goalscorer and the most productive striker of the league with 19 goals in 23 league matches.

In June 2014 he signed a contract with Enosis Neon Paralimni in order to help the team to return to the first division.
