= 2016–17 Cypriot Cup for lower divisions =

Tournament details
- Country: Cyprus
- Dates: 26 October 2016 – 11 May 2017
- Teams: 10

Final positions
- Champions: P.O. Xylotymbou (1st title)
- Runners-up: Ethnikos Latsion

Tournament statistics
- Matches played: 11
- Goals scored: 38 (3.45 per match)

The 2016–17 Cypriot Cup for lower divisions was the 9th edition of the Cypriot Cup for lower divisions. A total of 9 clubs entered the competition. It began on 26 October 2016 with the first round.

== Format ==
Only teams from the Cypriot Third Division and STOK Elite Division could participate. Participation was not compulsory. 9 of 30 participated that season.

The competition consisted of four rounds. In the first round each tie was played as a single leg and was held at the home ground of one of the two teams, according to the draw results. Each tie winner was qualifying to the next round. If a match was drawn, extra time was following. If extra time was drawn, there was a replay at the ground of the team who were away for the first game. If the rematch was also drawn, then extra time was following and if the match remained drawn after extra time the winner was decided by penalty shoot-out.

The next round were played in a two-legged format, each team playing a home and an away match against their opponent. The team which scored more goals on aggregate, was qualifying to the next round. If the two teams scored the same number of goals on aggregate, then the team which scored more goals away from home was advancing to the next round.

If both teams had scored the same number of home and away goals, then extra time was following after the end of the second leg match. If during the extra thirty minutes both teams had managed to score, but they had scored the same number of goals, then the team who scored the away goals was advancing to the next round (i.e. the team which was playing away). If there weren't scored any goals during extra time, the qualifying team was determined by penalty shoot-out.

The final was a single match.

== First round ==
The first round draw took place on 13 October 2016 and the matches played on 26 October 2016.

Team 1	Score	Team 2
(C) APEP Pitsilias	1–2	Ethnikos Latsion (C)
(E) Doxa Paliometochou	1–6	P.O. Xylotymbou (C)

== Quarter-finals ==
The quarter-finals draw took place on 15 November 2016 and the matches played on 30 November 2016.

Team 1	Score	Team 2
(C) Ethnikos Latsion	3–2	Koloni Geroskipou (E)
(C) P.O. Xylotymbou	2–1	Ormideia (C)
(C) Achyronas Liopetriou	0–5	Chalkanoras Idaliou (C)
(C) Peyia 2014	1–4	Digenis Akritas Morphou (C)

== Semi-finals ==
The semi-finals draw took place on 24 January 2017 and the matches played on 8 and 15 February 2017.

Team 1	Agg.	Team 2	1st leg	2nd leg
(C) Digenis Akritas Morphou	1–3	Ethnikos Latsion (C)	1–1	0–2
(C) Chalkanoras Idaliou	1–2	P.O. Xylotymbou (C)	0–0	1–2

== Final ==
11 May 2017
17:00 EEST

Ethnikos Latsion	1–2	P.O. Xylotymbou
Therapontos 46'	Report	Tavrou 15', 17'

AEK Arena, Larnaca
Attendance: 1,181
Referee: Marios Christoforou

Ethnikos	Xylotymbou

== Sources ==
- "Cyprus 2015/16". Rec.Sport.Soccer Statistics Foundation. 2016-09-01.
- Official website (in Greek)

== See also ==
- Cypriot Cup for lower divisions
- 2016–17 Cypriot Third Division
- 2016–17 STOK Elite Division
