= Francisco Varela (footballer, born 2000) =

Portuguese footballer

Personal information
- Full name: Francisco Oliveira Alves Varela
- Date of birth: 20 August 2000 (age 26)
- Place of birth: Almada, Portugal
- Height: 1.80 m (5 ft 11 in)
- Position: Midfielder

Team information
- Current team: Penafiel
- Number: 50

Youth career
- 2008–2012: Monte de Caparica
- 2012: Foot 7
- 2013: Almada
- 2013–2014: Charneca de Caparica
- 2014–2017: Cova da Piedade
- 2017: Sacavenense
- 2017–2019: Cova da Piedade

Senior career*
| Years | Team | Apps | (Gls) |
| 2019–2021 | Cova da Piedade | 13 | (0) |
| 2021–2022 | POX | 12 | (0) |
| 2022 | Ourense | 10 | (0) |
| 2023 | Sertanense | 8 | (0) |
| 2023–2024 | Pero Pinheiro | 25 | (2) |
| 2024–2025 | Portimonense | 19 | (0) |
| 2026 | Beroe | 15 | (0) |
| 2026– | Penafiel | 3 | (0) |
- * Club domestic league appearances and goals as of 12 September 2026

Francisco Oliveira Alves Varela (born 20 August 2000) is a Portuguese professional footballer who plays as a midfielder for Liga Portugal 2 club Penafiel.

== Football career ==
He made his professional debut for Cova da Piedade on 26 January 2020 in the LigaPro.
