= Marios Kokkinoftas =

Cypriot footballer

Personal information
- Full name: Marios Kokkinoftas
- Date of birth: 15/3/2003
- Position: Center back

Team information
- Current team: Karmiotissa FC
- Number: 20

Youth career
- 2019–2020: APOEL

Senior career*
Years	Team	Apps	(Gls)
2020-2023	APOEL	1	(0)
2022-2023	→ Olympias Lympion (loan)	23	(1)
2023-25	Akritas Chlorakas	2	(0)
2025-	Karmiotissa FC	24	(3)

International career
2019	Cyprus U17	2	(0)
2021	Cyprus U19	3	(0)
- * Club domestic league appearances and goals as of 6 September 2026

Marios Kokkinoftas (born 15 March 2003) is a Cypriot footballer who plays as a center back for Karmiotissa FC.

== Career ==
He made his professional debut for APOEL in a 1–0 loss against Karmiotissa. He has played as a centre back.

== International career ==
He made two appearances for the Cyprus U17 team and also captained the team
