= 2009–10 Cypriot Third Division =

Cypriot Third Division
- Season: 2009–10
- Champions: Chalkanoras (2nd title)
- Promoted: Chalkanoras; Adonis; Anagennisi
- Relegated: THOI; Kissos; Achyronas
- Matches played: 182
- Goals scored: 544 (2.99 per match)
- Top goalscorer: Alessandro Soares (18 goals)

The 2009–10 Cypriot Third Division was the 39th season of the Cypriot third-level football league. Chalkanoras Idaliou won their 2nd title.

== Format ==
Fourteen teams participated in the 2009–10 Cypriot Third Division. All teams played against each other twice, once at their home and once away. The team with the most points at the end of the season crowned champions. The first three teams were promoted to the 2010–11 Cypriot Second Division and the last three teams were relegated to the 2010–11 Cypriot Fourth Division.

=== Point system ===
Teams received three points for a win, one point for a draw and zero points for a loss.

== Changes from previous season ==
Teams promoted to 2009–10 Cypriot Second Division

- Akritas Chlorakas
- Frenaros FC
- Othellos Athienou

Teams relegated from 2008–09 Cypriot Second Division

- Chalkanoras Idaliou
- THOI Lakatamia
- Ethnikos Assia

Teams promoted from 2008–09 Cypriot Fourth Division

- Achyronas Liopetriou
- ENAD Polis Chrysochous
- Iraklis Gerolakkou

Teams relegated to 2009–10 Cypriot Fourth Division

- Anagennisi Trachoniou
- Orfeas Nicosia
- Olympos Xylofagou

== Stadia and locations ==
2009–10 Cypriot Third Division

Club	Venue
AEZ	Zakaki Municipal Stadium
AEK	Chloraka Municipal Stadium
Adonis	Adonis Idaliou Stadium
Anagennisi	Anagennisi Football Ground
Achyronas	Liopetri Municipal Stadium
Digenis	Xylotympou Municipal Stadium
Elpida	Michalonikion Stadium
Ethnikos	Stadium Keryneia Epistrophi
ENAD	Poli Chrysochous Municipal Stadium
THOI	EN THOI Stadium
Kissos	Kissonerga Municipal Stadium
Iraklis	Kykkos Stadium
Spartakos	Kiti Municipal Stadium
Chalkanoras	Chalkanoras Stadium

== League standings ==
Pos	Team	Pld	W	D	L	GF	GA	GD	Pts	Promotion or relegation
1	Chalkanoras Idaliou (C, P)	26	18	5	3	74	24	+50	59	Promoted to Cypriot Second Division
2	Adonis Idaliou (P)	26	12	11	3	47	28	+19	47	Promoted to Cypriot Second Division
3	Anagennisi Deryneia (P)	26	13	7	6	42	29	+13	46	Promoted to Cypriot Second Division
4	ENAD Polis Chrysochous	26	10	7	9	41	36	+5	37 (Note: ENAD 4p; AEZ 1p)	
5	AEZ Zakakiou	26	10	7	9	42	41	+1	37	
6	AEK Kouklia	26	9	8	9	37	39	−2	35	
7	Elpida Xylofagou	26	9	7	10	25	32	−7	34	
8	Spartakos Kitiou	26	9	6	11	41	36	+5	33	
9	Iraklis Gerolakkou	26	9	5	12	40	50	−10	32 (Note: Iraklis 4p; Ethnikos 1p)	
10	Ethnikos Assia	26	8	8	10	32	40	−8	32	
11	Digenis Oroklinis	26	8	7	11	36	50	−14	31	
12	THOI Lakatamia (R)	26	7	6	13	37	48	−11	27	Relegated to Cypriot Fourth Division
13	Kissos Kissonergas (R)	26	6	8	12	30	39	−9	26	Relegated to Cypriot Fourth Division
14	Achyronas Liopetriou (R)	26	5	6	15	20	52	−32	21	Relegated to Cypriot Fourth Division

Source: League standings at CFA
Rules for classification: 1) points; 2) head-to-head points; 3) head-to-head goal difference; 4) head-to-head away goals scored; 5) goal difference; 6) number of goals scored.
(C) Champions; (P) Promoted; (R) Relegated

== Results ==
Home \ Away	ADN	AEZ	AEK	ANG	ACR	DGN	THL	ETN	ELP	END	IRK	KSS	SPR	CHL
Adonis		3–0	3–2	2–0	5–1	3–1	1–0	4–1	2–1	2–2	2–1	0–0	1–1	2–2
AEZ	0–2		0–2	3–0	1–1	1–2	2–2	3–2	1–0	1–1	2–0	5–1	1–0	1–3
AEK	1–0	2–2		2–4	4–1	4–0	3–1	2–0	1–0	0–0	0–1	0–5	2–2	0–0
Anagennisi	1–1	1–2	4–1		2–0	4–0	1–1	2–0	1–1	2–1	2–2	2–1	0–3	2–0
Achyronas	1–1	0–1	1–0	1–2		2–1	0–1	2–2	0–2	3–1	2–1	0–1	4–3	0–0
Digenis	2–2	1–1	1–1	0–1	0–0		4–0	0–4	2–0	3–0	3–2	0–1	4–3	4–3
THOI	1–4	1–3	2–2	1–3	3–0	2–0		1–1	4–1	3–2	2–4	3–0	2–1	1–2
Ethnikos	0–0	2–2	2–1	0–2	2–0	1–1	1–1		1–0	1–2	2–2	2–1	3–2	3–1
Elpida	2–1	2–1	3–0	2–1	1–1	1–0	2–2	0–0		3–2	0–0	1–1	1–0	1–1
ENAD	0–2	4–1	2–2	1–1	1–0	2–2	3–1	2–0	2–0		0–2	3–0	4–1	1–2
Iraklis	2–2	0–6	1–2	0–1	2–0	4–1	2–1	1–0	0–1	2–3		4–3	3–2	0–3
Kissos	2–2	2–2	1–2	0–0	1–0	1–2	2–1	1–2	2–0	0–0	2–2		0–1	1–3
Spartakos	0–0	1–0	0–0	2–1	6–0	1–1	2–0	2–0	3–0	0–1	2–1	1–1		1–4
Chalkanoras	4–0	6–0	3–1	2–2	8–0	6–1	2–0	5–0	3–0	2–1	6–1	1–0	2–1	

Source: Results at CFA
Legend: Blue = home team win; Yellow = draw; Red = away team win.

== See also ==
- Cypriot Third Division
- 2009–10 Cypriot First Division
- 2009–10 Cypriot Cup for lower divisions

== Sources ==
- "2009/10 Cypriot Third Division". Rec.Sport.Soccer Statistics Foundation. 2016-01-14.
- "League standings" (in Greek). Cyprus Football Association. Archived from the original on December 21, 2015.
- "Results" (in Greek). Cyprus Football Association. Archived from the original on July 29, 2014.
- "Teams" (in Greek). Cyprus Football Association. Archived from the original on December 21, 2015.
- "Scorers" (in Greek). Cyprus Football Association. Archived from the original on December 21, 2015.
