= Roman Bolbocian =

Moldovan-Greek footballer

Personal information
- Date of birth: 13 May 1987 (age 39)
- Place of birth: Chișinău, Moldova
- Height: 1.88 m (6 ft 2 in)
- Position: Midfielder

Team information
- Current team: Digenis Oroklinis
- Number: 14

Youth career
- 1997–2005: Skoda Xanthi

Senior career*
Years	Team	Apps	(Gls)
2005–2007	Skoda Xanthi	0	(0)
2007–2008	Asteras Tripolis	0	(0)
2008–2009	Ilioupoli	34	(2)
2010	Lokomotiv Plovdiv	0	(0)
2010–2012	Digenis Morphou	35	(3)
2012–2013	Chalkanoras Idaliou	19	(0)
2013–2014	Elpida Xylofagou	23	(4)
2014	Digenis Oroklinis	12	(0)
2015	Fokikos	6	(0)
2015–2016	Elpida Xylofagou	23	(1)
2016–2018	ASIL	37	(0)
2018–	Digenis Oroklinis	27	(2)
- * Club domestic league appearances and goals as of 31 May 2019

Roman Bolbocian (born 13 May 1987) is a Moldovan/Greek footballer who currently plays for Digenis Oroklinis as a midfielder.

Born in Moldova, in 2005, he received a Greek passport.

== Career ==
Bolbocian was born in Moldova, but moved to Greece when was 10. He began his career with a Greek club Skoda Xanthi. In Greece he also played for Asteras Tripolis and Ilioupoli, before moving to Bulgaria in February 2010, signing a contract with Lokomotiv Plovdiv.
