= 2012–13 Cypriot Second Division =

Cypriot Second Division
- Season: 2012–13
- Champions: Aris (5th title)
- Promoted: Aris; AEK Kouklia; Ermis
- Relegated: PAEEK; AEZ; Onisilos; Chalkanoras; Akritas; Ethnikos
- Matches played: 194
- Goals scored: 534 (2.75 per match)
- Top goalscorer: Stamatis Pantos (16 goals)

The 2012–13 Cypriot Second Division was the 58th season of the Cypriot second-level football league. It began on 15 September 2012 and ended on 11 May 2013. The defending champions were Doxa Katokopias. Aris Limassol and AEK Kouklia finished equal on points but Aris Limassol won the championship because they had a better goal difference than AEK Kouklia in the matches played between the two teams.

== Team Changes from 2011–12 ==
Teams promoted to 2012–13 Cypriot First Division

- Doxa Katokopias
- Ayia Napa
- AEP Paphos

Teams relegated from 2011–12 Cypriot First Division

- Aris Limassol
- Anagennisi Deryneia
- Ermis Aradippou

Teams promoted from 2011–12 Cypriot Third Division

- Champions: AEK Kouklia
- Runners-up: Nikos & Sokratis Erimis, AEZ Zakakiou

Teams relegated to 2012–13 Cypriot Third Division

- APOP Kinyras
- Enosis Neon Parekklisia
- Atromitos Yeroskipou

== League table ==
Pos	Team	Pld	W	D	L	GF	GA	GD	Pts	Qualification or relegation
1	Aris Limassol	26	16	7	3	64	21	+43	55	Qualification for promotion group
2	Ermis Aradippou	26	15	7	4	41	23	+18	52	Qualification for promotion group
3	AEK Kouklia	26	16	2	8	55	28	+27	50	Qualification for promotion group
4	Anagennisi Deryneia	26	12	7	7	28	23	+5	43	Qualification for promotion group
5	APEP	26	12	6	8	35	25	+10	42	
6	Nikos & Sokratis Erimis	26	12	5	9	37	33	+4	41	
7	Omonia Aradippou	26	9	8	9	40	40	0	35	
8	Othellos Athienou	26	9	7	10	28	35	−7	34	
9	PAEEK (R)	26	9	6	11	35	37	−2	33	Relegated to Cypriot B2 Division
10	AEZ Zakakiou (R)	26	10	2	14	34	45	−11	32	Relegated to Cypriot B2 Division
11	Onisilos Sotira (Note: Onisilos Sotira started the league with three points deduction because they did not met the financial criteria.) (R)	26	8	8	10	21	32	−11	29	Relegated to Cypriot B2 Division
12	Chalkanoras Idaliou (R)	26	8	5	13	34	42	−8	29	Relegated to Cypriot B2 Division
13	Akritas Chlorakas (Note: On 28 November 2012, Akritas Chlorakas were deducted three points because they did not met the financial criteria.) (R)	26	4	5	17	23	42	−19	14	Relegated to Cypriot Third Division
14	Ethnikos Assia (R)	26	3	3	20	25	74	−49	12	Relegated to Cypriot Third Division

Source: CFA
(R) Relegated

=== Promotion group ===
Pos	Team	Pld	W	D	L	GF	GA	GD	Pts	Qualification
1	Aris Limassol (C, P)	32	19	8	5	75	29	+46	65 (Note: ARIS: 6 pts (GD: +3); AEK: 6 pts (GD: -3))	Promoted to Cypriot First Division
2	AEK Kouklia (P)	32	21	2	9	69	37	+32	65	Promoted to Cypriot First Division
3	Ermis Aradippou (P)	32	17	7	8	47	34	+13	58	Promoted to Cypriot First Division
4	Anagennisi Deryneia	32	13	8	11	31	29	+2	47	Qualification for promotion play-offs

Source: CFA
Rules for classification: 1) points; 2) goal difference; 3) number of goals scored.
(C) Champions; (P) Promoted

==== Results ====
Home \ Away	AEK/K	DER	ARI	ERM
AEK Kouklia		2–1	2–1	3–1
Anagennisi Deryneia	1–2		0–0	0–1
Aris Limassol	3–4	1–0		3–1
Ermis Aradippou	2–1	0–1	1–3	

Source: CFA
Legend: Blue = home team win; Yellow = draw; Red = away team win.

== Season statistics ==
=== Top scorers ===
Including matches played on 11 May 2013; Source: CFA

Rank	Player	Club	Goals
1	(Cyprus) Stamatis Pantos	AEK Kouklia	16
2	(Cyprus) Giorgos Kavazis	AEZ Zakakiou	13
2	(Brazil) Wender	Aris Limassol	13
4	(Nigeria) Marco Tagbajumi	APEP	12
4	(Portugal) Ângelo	AEK Kouklia	12
6	(Cyprus) Demos Demosthenous	Othellos Athienou	11
6	(Cyprus) Andreas Kyprianou	Aris Limassol	11
8	(Portugal) Wesllem	Anagennisi Deryneia	10
8	(Portugal) Pedro Alves	Aris Limassol	10
8	(Portugal) Hardy Pinto	Omonia Aradippou	10
8	(Greece) Panagiotis Linardos	AEZ Zakakiou	10
8	(Cyprus) Constantinos Mintikkis	Omonia Aradippou	10

== Sources ==
- "2012/13 Cypriot Second Division". Rec.Sport.Soccer Statistics Foundation. 2016-01-14.

== See also ==
- 2012–13 Cypriot First Division
- 2012–13 Cypriot Cup
