= Karmiotissa FC =

Cypriot football club

Karmiotissa
- Full name: Karmiotissa Football Club
- Founded: 1979; 47 years ago
- Ground: Ammochostos Stadium, Larnaca
- Capacity: 5,500
- Chairman: Vacant
- Manager: Alexis Garpozis
- League: First Division
- 2025–26: Second Division, 2nd of 14 (promoted)
- Website: karmiotissafc.football
Home colours	Away colours

Karmiotissa Football Club (Greek: Καρμιώτισσα Πολεμιδιών, romanized: Karmiotissa Polemidion) is a football club based in Pano Polemidia, Limassol, Cyprus. They compete in the Cypriot First Division. The club's colors are orange and white.

The home ground of the football team is the Community Stadium of Pano Polemidia. In the 2022–23 season, they mostly played in Stelios Kyriakides Stadium in Paphos. The club's name comes from the chapel of Virgin Mary Karmiotissa located in Pano Polemidia. Cypriot businessman Stavros Demosthenous owned the club from 2023 until his death in 2025.

== History ==
Karmiotissa was founded in 1979, and initially played in the amateur leagues organised by STOK. Their first appearance in a CFA competition came in the 1986–87 season when the club competed in the Fourth Division. The second one came in 2009, when a 4–0 win against Enosi Neon Ypsona earned Karmiotissa promotion to the Fourth Division.

Karmiotissa remained in the fourth division until the 2011–12 season, when a second-place finish meant they were promoted to the Third Division. The following season, they earned promotion for the second year in a row by winning the 2012–13 Third Division. Karmiotissa competed in the Second Division until the 2015–16 season, when they won the league to earn promotion to the First Division for the first time ever, however they were not able to avoid relegation in the 2016–17 season. They returned to the top flight in the 2020–21 season, but finished in last place and were relegated once more. Karmiotissa won the Second Division for the second time in the 2021–22 season to return to the First Division.

In 2022, Russian businessman Dmitry Punin acquired the club. Residing in the Limassol area, he is active in wine and real estate business, formerly also in gambling. In the first season under his ownership, Karmiotissa were able to safely avoid relegation from the First Division, finishing in 10th place. In November 2022, the team's emblem was changed. On 8 February 2023, all-time topscorer of the Russian national team Aleksandr Kerzhakov joined Karmiotissa as the new head coach.

On the 17th October, 2025 the chairman Stavros Demosthenous was shot dead whilst leaving his house.

The progress of Karmiotissa in CFA competitions
Season	Championship										Cup	
Season	Division	Place	Teams	Matches	Wins	Draws	Losses	Goals		Points	Competition	Phase
Season	Division	Place	Teams	Matches	Wins	Draws	Losses	For	Against	Points	Competition	Phase
2009–10	D'	8	15	28	11	6	11	46	53	39	Lower Divisions' Cup	Second phase
2010–11	D'	4	14	26	13	5	8	49	36	44	Not participated.	
2011–12	D'	2	15	28	17	6	5	60	22	57	Not participated.	
2012–13	C'	1	14	26	17	5	4	49	19	56	Not participated.	
2013–14	Β2	1	8	28	17	7	4	55	23	58	Cypriot Cup	First phase
2014–15	B'	5	14	26	12	2	12	36	29	38	Cypriot Cup	Quarter-finals
Awarded points: Win=3 points, Draw=1 point, Loss=0 points

== Players ==
As of 15 September 2026

Note: Flags indicate national team as defined under FIFA eligibility rules; some limited exceptions apply. Players may hold more than one non-FIFA nationality.

No.	Pos.	Nation	Player
1	GK	GRE	Nikos Giannakopoulos
4	DF	FRA	Sadio Dembélé
5	DF	RUS	Aleksandr Martynov (on loan from Aris Limassol)
7	MF	NED	Mateja Bajunović
8	MF	GLP	Curtis Yebli
9	FW	BRA	Patrick Luan
10	MF	SCO	Alastair Reynolds
11	MF	CYP	Iakovos Savvidis
14	FW	CYP	Nikolas Chatzivarnava
18	GK	CYP	Andreas Violaris
19	MF	CYP	Stelios Panagiotou
20	DF	CYP	Marios Kokkinoftas
21	MF	CYP	Petros Psychas
22	DF	ESP	Rubén García
23	MF	GEO	Alexandre Kutateladze
26	MF	ALB	Xhuljo Tabaku

No.	Pos.	Nation	Player
27	MF	AUS	Manolis Pavlis
28	MF	FRA	Malcolm Elhmidi
30	MF	CYP	Marios Theocharous (on loan from Aris Limassol)
32	GK	CYP	Marinos Christou
33	DF	BRA	Julio César (on loan from Aris Limassol)
34	FW	NED	Jaël Pawirodihardjo (on loan from Aris Limassol)
42	DF	FRA	Nassim Ouammou
44	DF	LBN	Jad Smaira
57	MF	CYP	Artemis Spanos
70	FW	CYP	Themistoklis Themistokleous
77	MF	GRE	Panagiotis Tachtsidis
97	DF	GRE	Angelos Argyriou
99	GK	CYP	Dimitrios Priniotaki
—	DF	SEN	Aboubacar Loucoubar (on loan from Aris Limassol)
—	MF	CYP	Theodosis Kyprou

== Honours ==
- Cypriot Second Division
  - Champions: 2015–16, 2021–22
- Cypriot Third Division
  - Champions: 2012–13
