= 2009–10 Cypriot Fourth Division =

Cypriot Fourth Division
- Season: 2009–10
- Champions: EN Parekklisia (1st title)
- Promoted: EN Parekklisia; N.&S. Erimis; Anagennisi G.
- Relegated: Orfeas; Ellinismos; Olympos; AEK
- Matches played: 210
- Goals scored: 692 (3.3 per match)
- Top goalscorer: Constantinos Constantinou (27 goals)

The 2009–10 Cypriot Fourth Division was the 25th season of the Cypriot fourth-level football league. Enosis Neon Parekklisia won their 1st title.

== Format ==
Fifteen teams participated in the 2009–10 Cypriot Fourth Division. All teams played against each other twice, once at their home and once away. The team with the most points at the end of the season crowned champions. The first three teams were promoted to the 2010–11 Cypriot Third Division and the last four teams were relegated to regional leagues.

=== Point system ===
Teams received three points for a win, one point for a draw and zero points for a loss.

== Changes from previous season ==
Teams promoted to 2009–10 Cypriot Third Division

- Achyronas Liopetriou
- ENAD Polis Chrysochous
- Iraklis Gerolakkou

Teams relegated from 2008–09 Cypriot Third Division

- Anagennisi Trachoniou
- Orfeas Nicosia
- Olympos Xylofagou

Teams promoted from regional leagues

- Ethnikos Latsion FC
- Karmiotissa Pano Polemidion
- Ormideia FC

Teams relegated to regional leagues

- Sourouklis Troullon
- APEP Pelendriou
- Dafni Troulloi

Notes:

- AEK Kythreas also participated in the 2009–10 Cypriot Fourth Division. AEK's relegation during 2006–07 Cypriot Fourth Division forced the team to suspend operations. The team resumed operations in the 2009–10 season. According to a specific regulation, the refugees football clubs that were resuming their operations could participate in the Cypriot Fourth Division. So, AEK's application to participate in the fourth division was accepted.

== Stadia and locations ==
2009–10 Cypriot Fourth Division

Club	Venue
AEK Kythreas	Kykkos Stadium
Anagennisi Germasogeias	Germasogeia Municipal Stadium
Anagennisi Trachoniou	Trachoni Municipal Stadium
ASPIS Pylas	Pyla Municipal Stadium
Ethnikos Latsion FC	Latsia Municipal Stadium
Ellinismos Akakiou	Ellinismos Akakiou Stadium
Enosis Neon Parekklisia	Parekklisia Municipal Stadium
Enosis Kokkinotrimithia	Kokkinotrimithia Municipal Stadium
Karmiotissa Pano Polemidion	Pano Polemidia Municipal Stadium
Konstantios & Evripidis Trachoniou	Trachoni Municipal Stadium
Nikos & Sokratis Erimis	Erimi Municipal Stadium
Olympos Xylofagou	Makario Stadium Xylofagou
Orfeas Nicosia	Orfeas Stadium
P.O. Xylotymvou	Xylotympou Municipal Stadium
Ormideia FC	Ormideia Municipal Stadium

== League standings ==
Pos	Team	Pld	W	D	L	GF	GA	GD	Pts	Promotion or relegation
1	Enosis Neon Parekklisia (C, P)	28	22	2	4	73	27	+46	68	Promoted to Cypriot Third Division
2	Nikos & Sokratis Erimis (P)	28	18	5	5	69	35	+34	59	Promoted to Cypriot Third Division
3	Anagennisi Germasogeias (P)	28	17	3	8	71	43	+28	54	Promoted to Cypriot Third Division
4	Konstantios & Evripidis Trachoniou	28	14	6	8	48	28	+20	48	
5	ASPIS Pylas	28	13	5	10	52	43	+9	44	
6	Ormideia FC	28	11	10	7	42	39	+3	43	
7	Anagennisi Trachoniou	28	11	6	11	42	40	+2	39 (Note: Anagennisi 8p; Karmiotissa 5p; Ethninos 3p)	
8	Karmiotissa Pano Polemidion	28	11	6	11	46	53	−7	39	
9	Ethnikos Latsion FC	28	12	3	13	54	47	+7	39	
10	Enosis Kokkinotrimithia	28	11	5	12	29	39	−10	38	
11	P.O. Xylotymvou	28	10	6	12	41	49	−8	36	
12	Orfeas Nicosia (R)	28	10	4	14	40	47	−7	34	Relegated to regional leagues
13	Olympos Xylofagou (R)	28	5	5	18	28	59	−31	20	Relegated to regional leagues
14	Ellinismos Akakiou (Note: Ellinismos Akakiou 3 points deducted.) (R)	28	5	3	20	29	66	−37	15	Relegated to regional leagues
15	AEK Kythreas (Note: AEK Kythreas 9 points deducted.) (R)	28	2	7	19	28	77	−49	4	Relegated to regional leagues

Source: League standings at CFA
Rules for classification: 1) points; 2) head-to-head points; 3) head-to-head goal difference; 4) head-to-head away goals scored; 5) goal difference; 6) number of goals scored.
(C) Champions; (P) Promoted; (R) Relegated

== Results ==
Home \ Away	AEK	ANG	ANT	ASP	ETN	ELN	ENK	ENP	KAR	KET	N&S	OLM	ORF	POX	ORM
AEK Kythreas		1–7	2–1	1–4	4–4	1–2	3–3	0–2	1–6	1–1	2–7	0–1	0–0	1–2	0–0
Anagennisi G.	2–0		4–3	2–1	2–0	4–0	3–1	0–2	3–1	1–0	1–2	1–3	1–2	3–2	4–2
Anagennisi T.	1–0	2–1		2–1	3–1	1–2	2–1	2–1	0–0	0–1	2–3	6–0	1–1	0–0	1–1
ASPIS	3–1	5–3	2–3		1–4	1–1	1–0	1–1	1–1	0–3 (Note: The game ASPIS-K&E Trahoniou originally ended 1–1. It was awarded to K&E Trahoniou with 0–3.)	1–1	2–1	1–0	5–2	1–2
Ethnikos Latsion FC	2–2	2–3	0–2	0–1		3–1	4–2	2–1	5–2	0–1	3–2	5–1	3–2	4–5	0–0
Ellinismos	0–1	0–6	2–1	1–2	0–2		1–2	0–1	4–5	1–4	1–2	2–2	0–1	0–1	3–2
Enosis Kok.	2–1	1–2	1–0	2–0	2–1	1–4		0–4	2–1	2–0	1–0	2–0	1–0	1–3	1–2
ENP	4–1	5–3	3–0	2–4	2–1	5–1	3–0		5–1	3–1	2–1	3–0	6–2	2–0	3–2
Karmiotissa	1–0	1–1	1–1	1–5	2–1	3–1	0–0	0–4		1–3	2–0	2–0	1–0	3–1	1–2
K & E	5–0	1–1	3–1	1–1	1–0	2–2	1–0	0–1	0–2		1–1	4–0	4–0	1–2	3–1
N & S	5–0	1–1	4–1	1–0	3–0	4–0	3–0	1–3	4–2	2–0		4–3	4–1	2–1	4–1
Olympos	3–3	0–3	2–0	2–3	0–1	1–0	0–0	3–0	0–2	0–2	1–2		1–2	1–1	1–1
Orfeas	2–0	1–6	0–2	1–4	1–0	4–0	0–1	1–2	5–1	1–1	2–3	4–1		0–0	3–1
POX	4–2	1–2	1–2	2–1	0–3	3–0	0–0	0–3	2–1	2–3	1–1	3–1	0–3		1–1
Ormideia FC	3–0	3–1	2–2	2–0	1–3	1–0	0–0	0–0	2–2	2–1	2–2	1–0	2–1	3–1	

Source: Results at CFA
Legend: Blue = home team win; Yellow = draw; Red = away team win.

== See also ==
- Cypriot Fourth Division
- 2009–10 Cypriot First Division
- 2009–10 Cypriot Cup for lower divisions
- Cypriot football league system

== Sources ==
- Official website (in Greek)
- "2009/10 Cypriot Fourth Division". Rec.Sport.Soccer Statistics Foundation. 2016-01-14.
- "League standings" (in Greek). Cyprus Football Association. Archived from the original on 2014-08-04.
- "Results" (in Greek). Cyprus Football Association. Archived from the original on 2014-08-04.
- "Teams" (in Greek). Cyprus Football Association. Archived from the original on 2015-12-24.
- "Scorers" (in Greek). Cyprus Football Association. Archived from the original on 2015-12-24.
