= Angelos Argyriou =

Greek footballer (born 2003)

Personal information
- Date of birth: 21 April 2003 (age 23)
- Place of birth: Athens, Greece
- Height: 1.82 m (6 ft 0 in)
- Position: Right-back

Team information
- Current team: Anagennisi Karditsa
- Number: 97

Youth career
- 2016–2020: Panionios

Senior career*
Years	Team	Apps	(Gls)
2020–2022	Panionios	17	(1)
2022–2024	Olympiacos B	39	(1)
2024–2025	Atromitos	0	(0)
2025	Asteras Tripolis	0	(0)
2025	Asteras Tripolis B	10	(0)
2025–2026	Olympiacos B	20	(0)
2026–	Anagennisi Karditsa	0	(0)
- * Club domestic league appearances and goals as of 21 March 2026

Angelos Argyriou (Greek: Άγγελος Αργυρίου; born 21 April 2003) is a Greek professional footballer who plays as a right-back for Super League 2 club Anagennisi Karditsa.
