= Podosfairikos Omilos Xylotymbou 2006 =

Cypriot football club

POX FC
- Full name: P.O XYLOTYMBOU
- Short name: POX FC
- Founded: 10 July 2006; 19 years ago
- Ground: Xylotymbou Municipality Stadium, Xylotymbou, Cyprus
- Chairman: Marios Vassiliou
- Coach: Eugenio Sena
Home colours	Away colours

POX FC (Greek: Ποδοσφαιρικός Όμιλος Ξυλοτύμβου) is a Cypriot football club based in the village of Xylotymbou. The club was formed in 2006 after a merger of two Xylotymbou clubs, Kimonas Xylotympou and Omonia Xylotymbou. The club won their first professional title in 2017, by winning the Cypriot Third Division. The team did not register itself for any league from 2024/25 and now it does not exist anymore.

== Players ==
=== First team squad ===
As of 26 December 2023

Note: Flags indicate national team as defined under FIFA eligibility rules; some limited exceptions apply. Players may hold more than one non-FIFA nationality.

No.	Pos.	Nation	Player
1	GK	MDA	Cătălin Moraru
2	MF	CYP	Charalambos Mouzouros
3	DF	CYP	Christos Efstathiou
4	DF	POR	João Rodrigues
5	DF	BRA	Aristeu Campanati (Captain)
7	MF	POR	Gonçalo Ferreira
8	MF	ANG	Carlitos
10	FW	ANG	Chico Banza
11	FW	CYP	Giorgos Pontikos
13	DF	BRA	Jaílson
14	DF	CYP	Andreas Assiotis
17	DF	CYP	Stylianos Kallenos
19	MF	CYP	Loizos Fotiou

No.	Pos.	Nation	Player
20	DF	CYP	Constantinos Nicolaou
31	DF	CYP	Christos Paroutis
36	GK	SUI	Bojan Milosavljević
40	GK	SVK	Adam Kováč
42	MF	POR	Diogo Barbosa
44	MF	CYP	Nicolas Constantinou
45	DF	CYP	Konstantinos Kyriakou
50	MF	POR	Francisco Varela (vice-captain)
67	GK	CYP	Christian Nicos Demetriou
77	FW	COL	Yair Castro
88	MF	CYP	Arsenios Demetriou
99	MF	CYP	Marko Antoni Melas

For recent transfers, see List of Cypriot football transfers summer 2021

== League history ==
P.O. Xylotymbou at CFA competitions
Season	Championship										Cup	
Season	Division	Position	Teams	Played	Won	Drawn	Lost	Goals		Points	Cup	Round
Season	Division	Position	Teams	Played	Won	Drawn	Lost	For	Against	Points	Cup	Round
2007–08	D	11	14	26	9	6	11	39	43	33	Not participate	
2008–09	D	4	14	26	13	5	8	58	37	44	Lower Division Cup	Quarter-finals
2009–10	D	11	15	28	10	6	12	41	49	36	Lower Division Cup	Quarter-finals
2010–11	D	6	14	26	10	8	8	42	37	38	Lower Division Cup	Quarter-finals
2011–12	D	4	15	28	11	10	6	41	22	46	Lower Division Cup	First round
2012–13	D	11	14	26	8	7	11	38	33	31	Not participate	
2013–14	D	7	15	28	12	6	10	44	39	42	Not participate	
2014–15	D	2	14	26	17	4	5	63	21	55	Not participate	
2015–16	C	7	16	30	12	8	10	36	43	44	Lower Division Cup	Runner-up
2016–17	C	1	16	30	22	4	4	54	22	70	Lower Division Cup	Winner
2017–18	B	12	14	26	7	5	14	29	44	26	Cypriot Cup	First round
2018–19	C	4	16	30	14	10	6	39	25	52	Lower Division Cup	Round of 16
Standings: Win=3 points, Draw=1 point, Lose=0 points

== Honours ==
- Cypriot Third Division
  - Winners (1): 2016–17
- Cypriot Cup for lower divisions:
  - Winners (1): 2016–17 (shared)
