= Kedros Ayia Marina Skylloura =

Cypriot football club

- Founded: 1967; 58 years ago
- League: Third Division
- 2022–23: STOK Elite Division, 4th (promoted)

Kedros Ayia Marina Skylloura is a Cypriot association football club based in Agia Marina (Skylloura), located in the Nicosia District. Its colours are green and white. It has 1 participation in Cypriot Fourth Division. They were promoted to the Cypriot Third Division in 2023.
