= Costas Elia =

Cypriot footballer (born 1976)

Personal information
- Full name: Costas Elia
- Date of birth: 9 June 1976 (age 50)
- Place of birth: Famagusta, Cyprus
- Height: 1.80 m (5 ft 11 in)
- Position: Striker

Team information
- Current team: Anagennisi Dherynia
- Number: 9

Senior career*
Years	Team	Apps	(Gls)
1998–2002	Enosis Neon Paralimni	72	(19)
2002–2003	Skoda Xanthi	1	(1)
2003	Olympiakos Nicosia	9	(5)
2003–2008	Enosis Neon Paralimni	71	(25)
2008–2009	Alki Larnaca	17	(4)
2009–2010	ASIL	7	(1)
2010–2012	Anagennisi Dherynia	36	(10)

International career^{‡}
2004	Cyprus	1	(0)
- * Club domestic league appearances and goals as of May 2012 ‡ National team caps and goals as of July 2009

Costas Elia (Greek: Kώστας Ηλία, born 9 June 1976 in Famagusta, Cyprus) is a retired Cypriot football striker who has played for the national team of Cyprus. He also played for Anagennisi Dherynia, Skoda Xanthi, Olympiakos Nicosia, Enosis Neon Paralimni and Alki Larnaca.
