= Oroklini =

Oroklini Ορόκλινη Voroklini
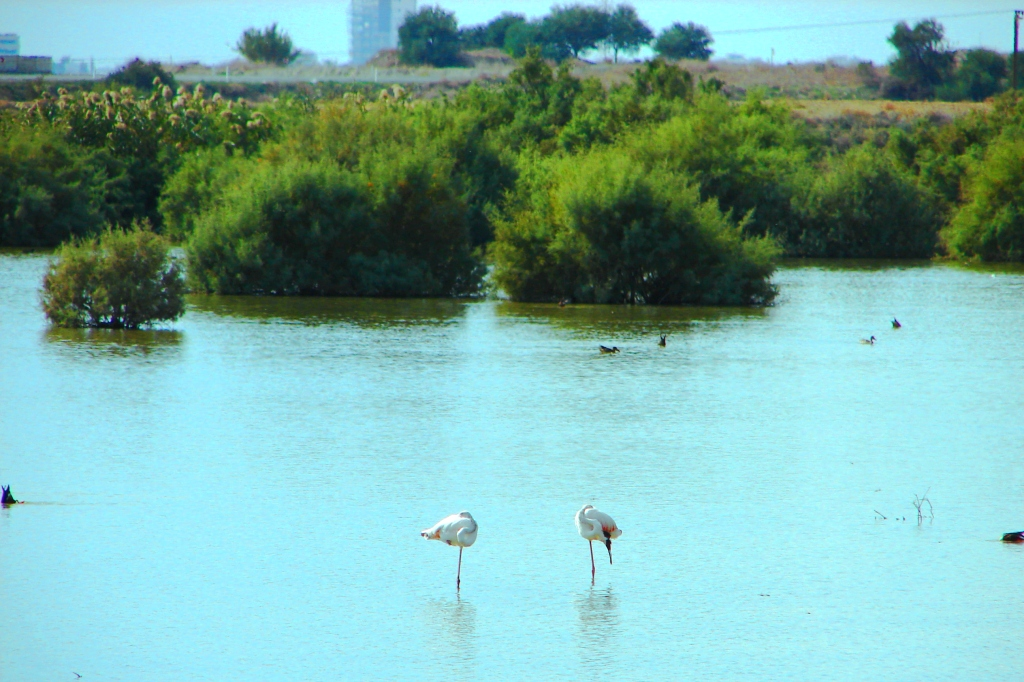
- Oroklini Lake in October 2011

- Location in Cyprus
- Coordinates: 34°58′58″N 33°39′16″E
- Country: Cyprus
- District: Larnaca District

Government
  - Type: Community
  - Council president: Neophytos Facontes

Population (2011)
  - Total: 6,134
- Time zone: UTC+2 (EET)
  - Summer (DST): UTC+3 (EEST)
- Website: https://voroklini.org

Voroklini (Greek: Βορόκληνη), more commonly known by its unofficial name Oroklini (Ορόκλινη), is a village in Larnaca District, Cyprus. Situated to the northeast of Larnaca, its population in 2011 was 6,134. The village houses residents from both Cyprus and abroad, with British citizens by far making up the largest percentage of its foreign-born population.

While the name of Oroklini refers mainly to the village behind Oroklini Lake, some coastal neighbourhoods in Livadia and on Dhekelia Road are usually also designated as outskirts of Oroklini.

== History ==
The area around the village was inhabited in ancient times, when there was intense mining in the region, especially for copper. It was an estate of despots and was probably destroyed by Saracens. In his Chronicle, Leontios Machairas mentions raids by the Saracens in the region during the reign of Janus of Cyprus (1398–1432). Oroklini and the surrounding villages were abandoned in the 15th century, resettled at a later date, abandoned again, then resettled again in the 16th century. In the 17th century, Venetian documents refer to the area as Vorochini. The village has also been found in historical documents under the names Porocumi and Voroclini. During the Venetian era, the village was abandoned yet again. Finally, it was permanently settled in the 18th century.

== Industry ==
Although copper is no longer mined, there are a number of quarries of grey soil, umber, and tera alba.

== Bird protection area ==
Oroklini Lake is designated as a Special Protection Area (SPA) and was subject to a three-year project starting in January 2012 to bring the lake to "favourable conservation status". The black-winged stilt and spur-winged lapwing were the main target species along with 58 bird species that migrate through, or overwinter within, the SPA. The shallow salt lakes are also home to greater flamingo. The lake has been designated an Important Bird Area (IBA) by BirdLife International.

== Churches ==
There are several deserted chapels in the area next to the mountainside. The old small church of the Archangel Michael from the 17th century is built in the Byzantine style. It was rebuilt in 1867. The new church of the Archangel Michael was built in 1986. The small church of the Prophet Elias was built in the 16th century on the hilltop west of the village. There was also the Church of Saint Thomas, which was a monastery from the 10th century.
