= AEK Kouklia =

AE Kouklion
- Full name: Athlitiki Enosi Kouklion
- Founded: 20 October 1968; 57 years ago
- Ground: Pafiako Stadium, Pafos, Cyprus
- Capacity: 9,394
- Chairman: Christakis Kaizer
- Manager: Stavros Fitidis
- Website: aekouklion.com
Home colours	Away colours

AE Kouklion (Greek: Αθλητική Ένωση Κουκλιων) was a Cypriot football team based in Kouklia of Paphos District. It was founded on 20 October 1968 and was dissolved on 9 June 2014, in order to be merged with AEP Paphos and create a new team, Pafos FC.

== History ==
AEK was started by young people from Kouklia, Paphos to get young people involved in sports and away from drugs and other harmful habits. In Paphos, there wasn't a regional league back then, so the team played friendly games with teams from other areas around Paphos.

In 1971, the Football Federation of Rural Clubs of Paphos (POASP) was founded. AEK participated in the federation's competitions from 1973 to 2006, winning many championships and cups. In 2006, AEK became champions in the 1st division of POASP and subsequently secured the promotion to Cypriot 5th Division (membership championship), enabling its entry into the Cyprus Football Federation (CFA) and the Cypriot Fourth Division. In its inaugural participation, the team secured a 2nd-place finish and earned promotion to the 3rd division. AEK remained in this division for five consecutive seasons, finishing 9th in the 2007-08 season, 7th in 2008-09, and 6th in 2009-10. During this period, AEK reached the final of the Cypriot Cup for lower divisions, but was defeated by Chalkaronas Idaliou (1–0).

In the 2010-11 season, AEK again finished in 6th place. However, in the 2011-12 season, AEK won the 3rd division, securing promotion to the 2nd division. Despite this success, AEK faced disappointment in the final of the Cypriot Cup for lower divisions, losing to Digenis Akritas Morphou with a score of 2–1.

Following this season, AEK rose to the Cypriot First Division in 2012-13 season by securing 2nd place in the Second division. In the 2013-14 season, AEK participated in the First Division. They finished 12th and were relegated back to the Second Division, narrowly missing out on staying in the First Division by just 2 points.

== Paphos FC ==
Following the end of the 2013–14 season, talks commenced between the officials of the AEK Kouklion and AEP Paphos regarding the merger of the two clubs. The results of the talks were as following:

a) The dissolution of AEP, which, burdened by debts, faced continual point deductions and had been demoted to the B2 group of the Second Division with the risk of further relegations. No formal merger attempt was made to avoid transferring AEP's debts to the new group, a scenario undesirable to both sides. Assets of AEP, such as pitches and buildings, would be transferred to the new team.

b) The rebranding of AEK Kouklion as Pafos FC (incorporating AEP) to establish a team representing the entirety of Paphos city and district, garnering support from fans and stakeholders of both AEP and Paphos at large.

On June 9, 2014, both groups separately approved the outlined plans, followed by the inaugural gathering of supporters of the new entity at the AEP building on June 10, 2014, attended by political and football figures of Paphos. Christakis Kaiser, the president of AEK Kouklion, assumed the presidency of Paphos FC.

== League history ==
The following table shows the progress of the team in time (for those seasons found data).

Season	Division	Place
2008–09	C	7th
2009–10	C	6th
2010–11	C	6th
2011–12	C	1st
2012–13	B	2nd
2013–14	Cypriot First Division	

== Honours ==
- Cypriot Third Division: 1

2011–12

- Cypriot Second Division:

Runner-up: 2012–13

- Cypriot Cup for lower divisions:

Runner-up: (2) 2009–10, 2011–12

== Managers ==
- Demetris Ioannou (22 June 2013 – 8 April 2014)
- Stavros Fitidis (8 April 2014–)
