= Dafni Troulloi =

- Founded: 1952; 73 years ago
- Ground: Troulloi Community Stadium

Dafni Troulloi is a Cypriot women's association football club based in Troulloi, located in the Larnaca District. Its stadium is the Troulloi Community Stadium and its colours are green and white. The team is competing in Cypriot First Division (women).

Previous it had a men association football team which had 1 participation in Cypriot Fourth Division. In 2015 the men's team merged with Sourouklis Troullon to form Troulloi FC 2015.
