= Oroklini-Troulloi FC =

Cypriot football club

Oroklini-Troulloi
- Full name: Oroklini-Troulloi FC 2020
- Founded: 1952
- Ground: Gipedo Troulloi, Troulloi
- Capacity: 1,000
- Chairman: Valentinos Alamangos
- Manager: Savvas Theodorou
- 2019–20: Third Division, 15th
Home colours	Away colours

Oroklini-Troulloi FC 2020 (Greek: Ορόκλινη-Τρούλλοι FC 2020) is a Cypriot football club which is based in the village of Troulloi in Larnaca district. The club was founded in 1952 as Digenis Oroklinis. In the 2014–2015 season the team competed in the Cypriot Second Division for the first time in its history.

== History ==
Digenis was founded in 1952 under the name Athletic Club Omonia Oroklinis. In 1983 the general meeting of the association decided to rename to Digenis. The club's emblem contained the date 1983 when the name changed. The team's colours are white, blue and green.

Oroklini-Troulloi FC 2020 was founded in June 2020 by the consolidation of Digenis Oroklinis and the Troulloi FC 2015 team, which had been formed three years earlier by a merger of Sourouklis Troullon and Dafni Troulloi. The new team moved from Oroklini to Troulloi.

The club has many appearances in the Third and Fourth Division.

== Current squad ==
As of 6 September 2018

Note: Flags indicate national team as defined under FIFA eligibility rules; some limited exceptions apply. Players may hold more than one non-FIFA nationality.

No.	Pos.	Nation	Player
2	DF	CYP	Kyriacos Paraskeva
3	DF	CYP	Zannetos Koumasis
4	DF	CYP	Andreas Chimonas (Captain)
5	DF	CYP	Theodoros Theodorou
6	MF	GER	Yannick Rolff
7	FW	BUL	Yordan Dimitrov
8	MF	CYP	Kyriacos Apostolou
9	FW	CYP	Nicolas Alexiou
10	MF	CYP	Chrysostomos Chrysostomou
12	DF	CYP	Agathangelos Nikiforou
14	MF	MDA	Roman Bolbocian
16	DF	GHA	Anderson Darkwa
17	MF	CMR	Sorel Chemin

No.	Pos.	Nation	Player
19	FW	CYP	Loizos Shikki
20	MF	CYP	Andreas Chapeshis
21	MF	CYP	Andreas Nicolaou
22	DF	CYP	Louben Stylianou
23	MF	CYP	Georgios Loizides
27	MF	CYP	Paraskevas Choutris
29	FW	CYP	Ioan Paisios Stef
32	GK	CYP	Gavriel Constantinou
33	FW	CYP	Vladislav Breguntov (on loan from Apollon Limassol)
40	GK	CYP	Ioannis Michael (on loan from AEK Larnaca)
69	DF	CYP	Georgios Velkov
93	FW	CYP	Nicos Pitsillides

For recent transfers, see List of Cypriot football transfers summer 2018.

== League history ==
The following table shows the progress of the team in time (for those seasons found data).

Season	Division	Place
2008–09	C	5th
2009–10	C	11th
2010–11	C	12th
2011–12	D	1st
2012–13	C	3rd
2013–14	B2	4th
2014–15	B	13th

== Honours ==
- Cypriot Fourth Division: 2

2007–08, 2011–12

- Cypriot Cup for lower divisions:

Runner-up: (1) 2008–09
