= POL/AE Maroni =

Cypriot football club

POL/AE Maroni was a Cypriot football club based in Maroni, Cyprus. They were played 1 season in Cypriot Third Division and 1 season in Fourth Division. They dissolved at 2012.
