= Nikos & Sokratis Erimis =

Cypriot football club

Nicos & Socratis Erimis
- Full name: Ethnikos Syllogos Nicos & Sokratis Erimis
- Founded: 1956
- Dissolved: 2016
- Ground: Erimi Community Stadium, Limassol, Cyprus
- Capacity: 1,000
- Chairman: Stavros Christoforou
- Manager: Hristo Arangelov
- League: Cypriot Second Division
- 2014–15: 8th
Home colours	Away colours

Nicos & Socratis Erimis (Greek: Νίκος & Σωκράτης Ερήμης) is a Cypriot football club based in Erimi, Limassol. The club was founded in 1956. Since 2013 the club competes in the Cypriot Second Division. The club colors are yellow and black.

== History ==
In 2009, the club won its promotion to a national division from the amateur League of STOK moving into Cypriot Fourth Division. In the final the club lost 2–1 at extra time against Constantios & Evripidis Trachoni.

== Stadium ==
The team's home ground is Erimi Community Stadium of 1000 capacity.

== League history ==
The following table shows the progress of the team in time (for those seasons found data).

Season	Division	Place
2008–09	D	7th
2009–10	D	2nd
2010–11	C	10th
2011–12	C	2nd
2012–13	B	6th
2013–14	B1	5th
2014–15	B	8th
