= Kissos FC Kissonergas =

- Full name: ΑΘΛΗΤΙΚΟΣ ΣΥΛΛΟΓΟΣ ΚΙΣΣΟΣ ΚΙΣΣΟΝΕΡΓΑΣ
- Nickname: ΚΙΣΣΟΝΕΡΓΙΤΕΣ
- Founded: 1990
- Ground: Kissonerga Municipality Stadium
- Capacity: 200
- Manager: Mauros K.
- League: POASP Championship

Kissos FC Kissonergas is a Cypriot football club based in Kissonerga of the Paphos District. They play regional football in Cyprus in the fifth tier, as part of the POASP federation.

== History ==
The club was founded in 2007 after the merger of two clubs: Kissos Kissonergas and AEM Mesogis. The team played 3 times in Cypriot Third Division and 4 times in Cypriot Fourth Division The club refounded then again in 2015 and is since then playing in the POASP division of smaller football teams in Paphos.
