= Erdenebat Batsuuri =

Mongolian general

Major General Erdenebat Batsuuri
- Батсуурийн Эрдэнэбат
- Education: National University of Defense; United States Army War College; Air Command and Staff College
- Military career
- Allegiance: Mongolia
- Branch: Mongolian Air Force
- Service years: 1990s–present
- Rank: Major general
- Commands: United Nations Peacekeeping Force in Cyprus; Gang Suppression Force
- Conflicts: South Sudanese Civil War; Cypriot conflict; Haitian conflict

Erdenebat Batsuuri (Mongolian: Батсуурийн Эрдэнэбат) is a Mongolian military officer. He has participated in various UN peacekeeping missions in Africa, Asia, Europe, and North America. Since 2026, he has served as the commander of the Gang Suppression Force (GSF), a United Nations-backed anti-gang military force in Haiti.

== Biography ==
Batsuuri graduated from the National University of Defense in Ulaanbaatar, Mongolia; the United States Army War College in Carlisle, Pennsylvania; and the Air Command and Staff College in Montgomery, Alabama. He also completed the Army Operations Course in Kingston, Canada.

Batsuuri participated in UN peacekeeping operations in Iraq, Kosovo, Sierra Leone, and Sudan. Batsuuri served as a contingent commander of the United Nations Mission in Liberia (UNMIL) from 2010 to 2011. He served as a battalion commander in the United Nations Mission in South Sudan (UNMISS) from 2013 to 2014, and later served as the chief of staff of the UNMISS South Sector from 2018 to 2019 and the Juba Sector from 2021 to 2022. Batsuuri was a member of the Mongolian Armed Forces general staff from 2014 to 2018, then the chief of staff of the Mongolian Air Force command from 2020 to 2023.

In January 2024, Batsuuri became the commander of the United Nations Peacekeeping Force in Cyprus (UNFICYP), succeeding Major General Ingrid Margrethe Gjerde. During his tenure, military violations at the United Nations Buffer Zone in Cyprus decreased from over 300 in 2024 to 149 by 2026. He left his command in January 2026 and was succeeded by Major General Mohammad Asadullah Minhazul Alam.

In May 2026, Batsuuri became the commander of the Gang Suppression Force (GSF), a UN-backed force tasked with combatting gangs in Haiti. He succeeded Godfrey Otunge.

Military offices
Preceded by Ingrid Margrethe Gjerde	Commander of the United Nations Peacekeeping Force in Cyprus; 2024–2026	Succeeded by Mohammad Asadullah Minhazul Alam
Preceded by Godfrey Otunge	Commander of the Gang Suppression Force; 2026–present	Incumbent
