= Pyrgos, Cyprus =

Pyrgos, Cyprus may refer to:

- Pyrgos, Limassol, a village in Cyprus
- Kato Pyrgos, a village in Cyprus
- Pano Pyrgos, a village in Cyprus
