= Deneia =

Deneia: Δένεια (Greek); Denya (Turkish)
- Village
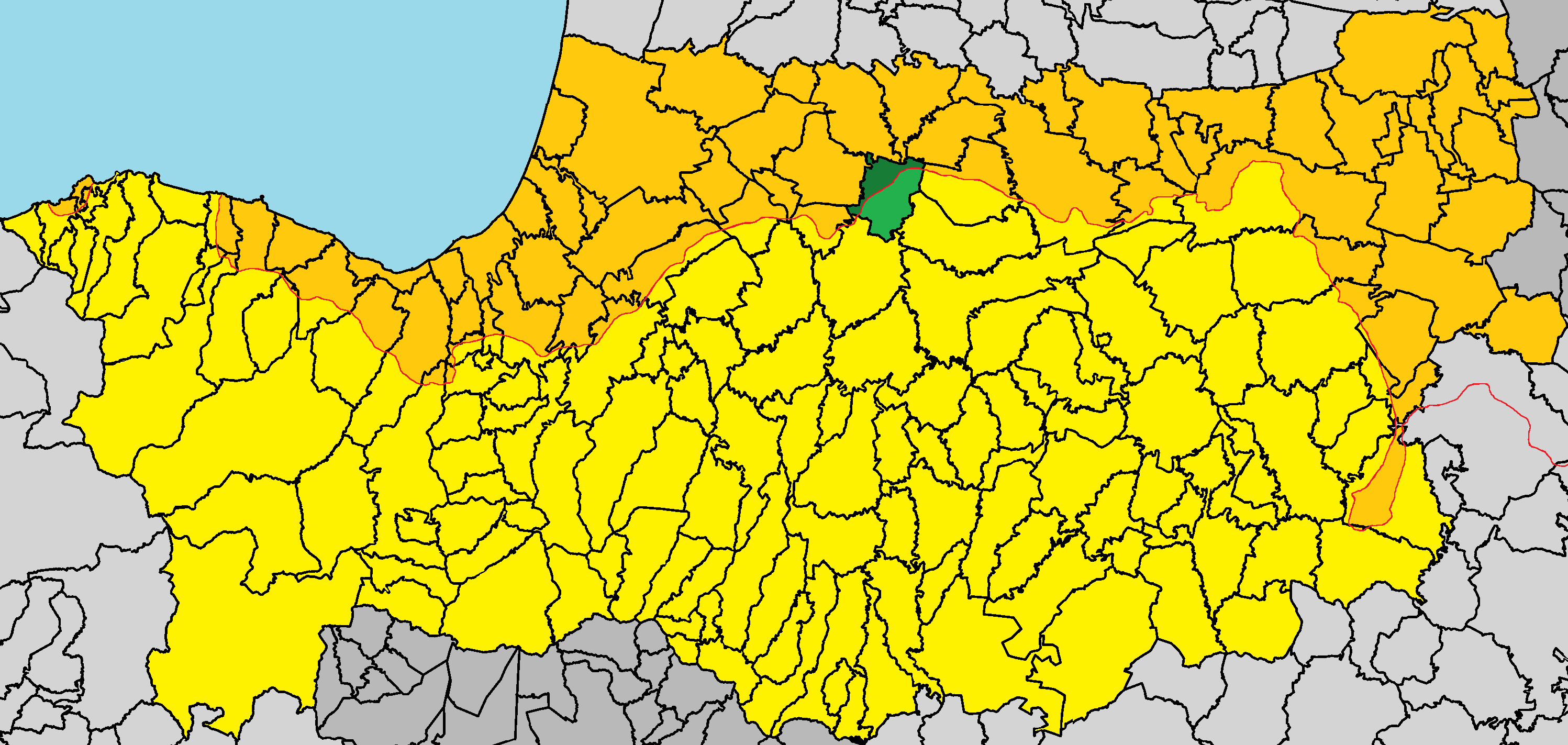

- Location in Cyprus
- Coordinates: 35°9′58″N 33°8′43″E
- Country: Cyprus
- District: Nicosia District

Population (2011)
  - Total: 373
- Time zone: UTC+2 (EET)
  - Summer (DST): UTC+3 (EEST)

Deneia (Greek: Δένεια [locally [ˈðeɲˑa]]; Turkish: Denya) is a village in the Nicosia District of Cyprus, west of Mammari. It is one of only four villages located within the United Nations Buffer Zone, the other three being Pyla, Athienou and Troulloi.

== Demographics ==
Historically, Deneia has been a mixed village. In the Ottoman census of 1831, the village had a Turkish Cypriot majority, with 17 Turkish Cypriot and 8 Greek Cypriot male inhabitants recorded. However, in 1891, both ethnic groups constituted half the village's population, with 82 Turkish Cypriot and 84 Greek Cypriots. Between 1891 and 1946, the village's Turkish Cypriot population did not increase, whilst the Greek Cypriot population continually increased. In 1960, Greek Cypriots constituted 61.5% of the population of 324 people (196 Greek Cypriots, 128 Turkish Cypriots). The Turkish Cypriots of the village fled to secure Turkish Cypriot enclaves in Fotta, Krini, Ortaköy and Lefka in 1964, in the wake of intercommunal violence. During the Turkish invasion of Cyprus in 1974, Greek Cypriot inhabitants also fled the village as the Turkish army advanced to the village, but they returned after the army withdrew. Turkish Cypriot inhabitants were relocated to Şirinevler (Agios Ermolaos), where they were given land. Today, the original Greek Cypriot inhabitants live in the village, while the Turkish Cypriot quarter lies in ruins.
