= Blue Beret Camp =

Headquarters of the United Nations Peacekeeping Force in Cyprus

- Cyprus
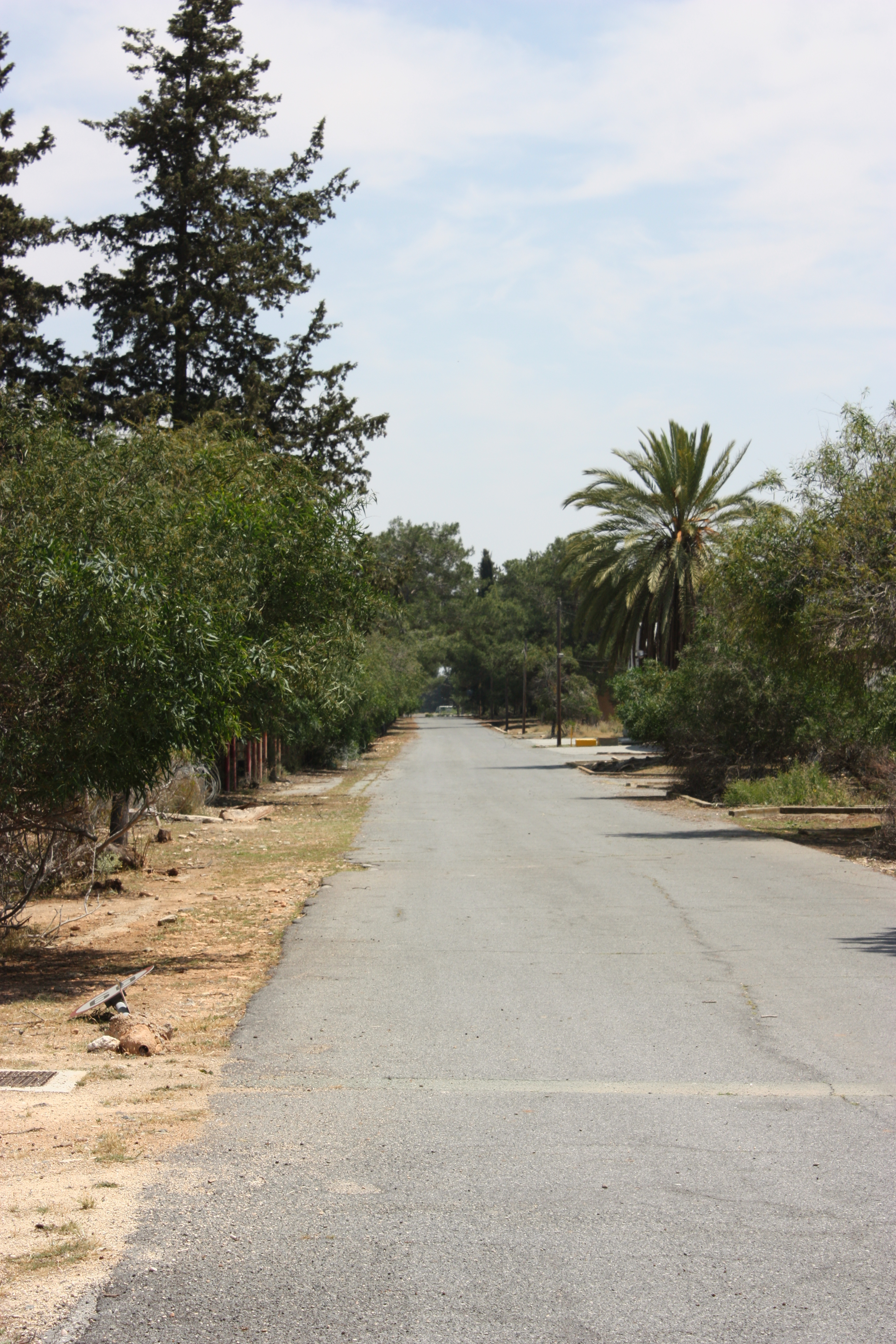
- The road to the Blue Beret Camp, headquarters of UNFICYP.

Site information
- Type: Barracks
- Owner: Republic of Cyprus
- Operator: United Nations Peacekeeping Force in Cyprus

Location
- Location within Cyprus
- Coordinates: 35.15512°N 33.29070°E

Site history
- Built: 1964
- In use: 1964-Present

Garrison information
- Occupants: United Nations Peacekeeping Force in Cyprus

Blue Beret Camp is a base camp and headquarters located at the former Nicosia International Airport on the west side of the city of Nicosia, on the Mediterranean island of Cyprus, which forms the headquarters of the United Nations Peacekeeping Force in Cyprus (UNFICYP).

== History ==
The camp was established within the United Nations Buffer Zone in Cyprus in 1964 to provide a command centre and residential accommodation for troops of the seven contingents serving with the United Nations Peacekeeping Force in Cyprus ('UNFICYP'). In 1972 Kurt Waldheim, Secretary-General of the United Nations visited the camp and in 2001 Bertie Ahern, the Irish Taoiseach, visited the camp.

== Wayne's Keep ==
Close by is Wayne's Keep, a Commonwealth War Graves Commission cemetery that contains graves primarily for aircrew who died during the Second World War.
