= Church Panagia Galoktisti =

Church in Nicosia District, Cyprus

Coordinates: 35.166420530686814°N 32.67327754592798°E

Galoktisti
- Church Panagia Galoktisti
- Galoktisti
- Location: Kato Pyrgos, Cyprus
- Country: Cyprus
- Denomination: Greek Orthodox

Architecture
- Architectural type: Byzantine
- Years built: 12th–14th century

Church Panagia Galoktisti (Greek: Παναγίας της Γαλόκτιστης) or Galoktisti is one of the oldest churches in Cyprus built in the 12th–14th century, and is located on a hill between the two villages Kato Pyrgos and Pano Pyrgos. It is 80 kilometers west of Nicosia. The church was given the name Galoktisti as it means "Built with Milk" in Greek, referencing the construction of the church. To solidify the church, instead of water, goat's milk was fermented with mud, and to this day the church is washed with a lime cross goat's milk liquid for preservation purposes, and by believers as a sign of faith, and to be healed of various different problems. The inside of the church forms the shape of a cross despite its square external appearance, and contains hagiographies which date back to the 12th–14th century.

== History ==
The area where the church now stands was once home to a village called "To Horkoui" during the Frankish occupation. The village was inhabited by several shepherds who suffered a devastating animal disease that decimated their herds. In desperation, the villagers prayed to Panagia (Virgin Mary) for help and promised to build a larger church in her honour if she would heal their animals. It is believed that Panagia answered their prayers and the herds quickly recovered. What happens after this is contentious.

The first belief is that the villagers of Horkoui then began construction on a larger church, using water from a nearby spring. However, their efforts were thwarted when the building was mysteriously torn down every night. This continued until the villagers realized that Panagia was asking for something more than a simple temple. They replaced the water with goat's milk and used it to ferment the clay used in the construction. When they attempted to add water again, the stones would not stick together. Thus, the church was completed the church entirely with milk.

The second belief is that the shepherds of the area had so much milk after the miracle that they fermented the clay with milk instead of water in order to bind the stones of the church together. However, when attempts to switch to water were made at some point, the stones did not stick to each other, which was interpreted by the villagers that the will of Panagia was that her temple be built with milk.

From then until this day, Panagia Galokstisti is considered a miracle worker, and many people from Cyprus resort there in the hope that Panagia would aid them in overcoming their problems of breastfeeding and lack of breast milk. There are miracles narrated in the village. One of them is about a family from Potamos tou Kampos. According to the narrative, the woman had no milk to nurse her child, so her and the child mounted their donkey and came to Church Panagia Galoktistis. After praying, the lady immediately began to feel milk flow from the woman's breasts.

An icon of Panagia Galoktistis is located in the church of Saints Constantine and Helen, in the center of the village, for security reasons. This icon was significant as Christians used to spend the whole night praying with the icon of the Virgin Mary in Panagia Galoktistis, however one night whilst they were prayed, they fell asleep and discovered when they woke up that the icon of Virgin Mary was no longer there. It was worried that Turkish people might have stolen it. However, when they returned to the church, the icon was there, filled with water, surrounded by holy flowers, and with candles still burning. For safety reasons, the icon was subsequently transferred to the church of Saints Constantine and Helen, located in the center of their village. People go there to pray when they are in need of help from God and Panagia.

=== Present day ===
The church still stands today, and is a popular tourist attraction and place of worship for not only Greek Cypriots but Turkish Cypriots in the Kato Pyrgos area. The church has notably been accepted and used by Turkish Cypriots despite the conflicts between Turkey and Cyprus, even after Turkey's invasion of Cyprus. Younger Turkish Cypriot people also go to Church Panagia Galoktistis to pray to this day. The reputation of the church has spread to areas such as Paphos, where many go to worship and see the church up close.

== Architecture and features ==
The Panagia Galoktisti temple consists of two phases of construction. The main church is a small single-room vaulted structure, to which a square narthex was added in the west. The narthex features a furnace dome, a typical characteristic of Middle Byzantine-era monuments in Cyprus. The temple was constructed using local volcanic stones, sandstones, and cobbles from the nearby river. Lime plaster was used as a binding material, which was originally used to cover the outer surfaces of the walls with red-printed decoration of geometric elements. The roof is covered with hydraulic mortar and the floor with pebbles. The temple has two rectangular entrances to the narthex, one on the north and one on the west wall, and a small window in the arch of the sacred step. The temple was once full of frescoes, but only two superimposed layers have been identified, and they have suffered extensive damage.

The reconstruction of the iconographic cycle of the temple is difficult since no scene has survived from the original layer. On the north wall of the main church, Saints Constantine and Helen are depicted, while Saint Auxibius is preserved on the arch of the holy step. An unidentified saint is located on the north wall of the narthex, and on the pesso (Greek: πεσσό) of the northern spherical triangle is depicted Saint John the Forerunner, who was part of the prayer scene. The figure of an archangel is on the south wall. Part of the scene of the Nativity of Christ is preserved in the furnace or apse.

The interior of the church was most likely adorned with frescoes, however, the original frescoes have not survived, with the exception of a few remaining depictions, such as the Saint Auxibius in the arch of the sacred step, Saints Constantine and Helen on the north wall, and a partial depiction of the Birth of Christ on the apse.

Based on the style and architecture of the temple, the Department of Antiquities (the directors, Marina Solomidou-Ieronimidos, Georgios Filotheos) which undertook the restoration of the temple, decided that the main church was likely constructed in the 11th century based on architectural and stylistic elements, while the narthex and the second phase of wall painting were added in the 12th century. Its iconography was dated from the 12th-14th century. The temple's large-scale Ephesian icon, which depicts the infant Virgin Mary as Kykkotissa, dates back to the end of the 13th century and is known to be a remarkable feature of the temple.
