= United Nations Peacekeeping Force in Cyprus =

United Nations peacekeeping mission in Cyprus

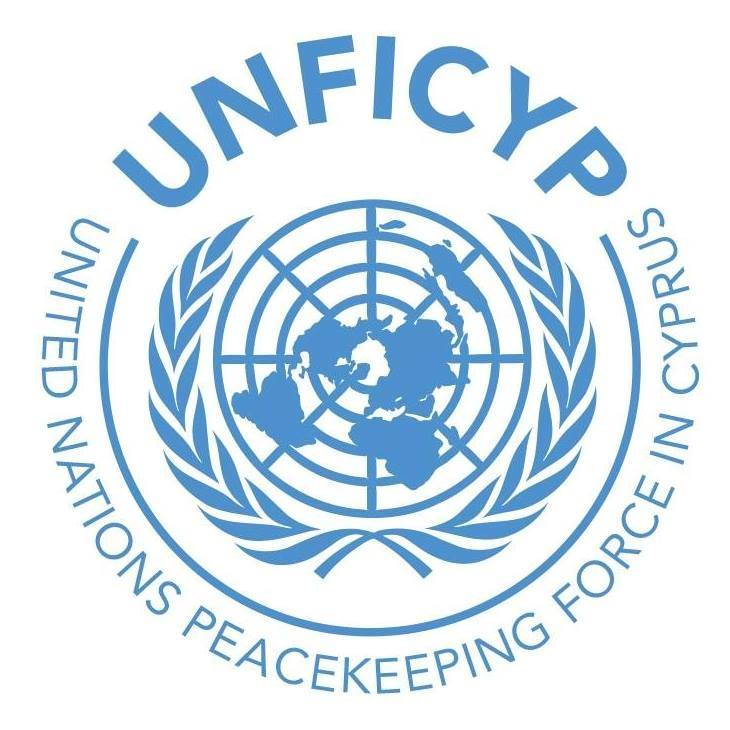

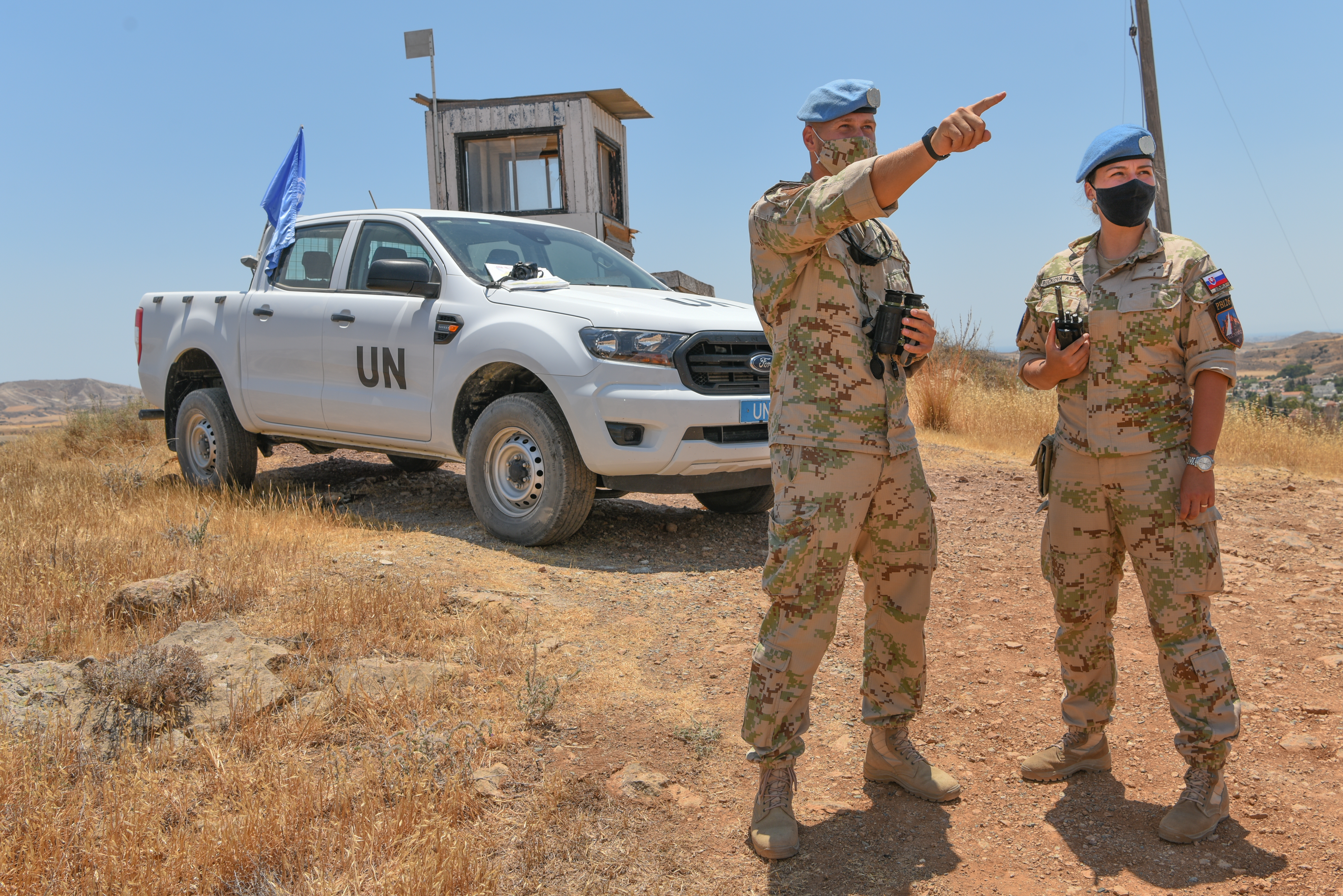
- UNFICYP peacekeepers patrolling the buffer zone.
- Abbreviation: UNFICYP
- Formation: 1964
- Type: Peacekeeping force
- Legal status: Active
- Headquarters: Blue Beret Camp, Nicosia International Airport
- Special Representative and Head of Mission: Khassim Diagne (Senegal)
- Force Commander: Lieutenant General Minhazul Alam (Bangladesh)
- Senior Adviser: Aderemi Adekoya (Nigeria)
- Chief Mission Support: Joel Cohen (Australia)
- Parent organization: Department of Peace Operations
- Budget: US$57,611,600 (1 July 2025–30 June 2026)
- Website: UNFICYP Home page

The United Nations Peacekeeping Force in Cyprus (UNFICYP) is a United Nations Peacekeeping Force that was established under United Nations Security Council Resolution 186 in 1964 to prevent a recurrence of fighting following intercommunal violence between the Greek Cypriots and Turkish Cypriots, to contribute to the maintenance and restoration of law and order and to facilitate a return to normal conditions. Major General Erdenebat Batsuuri (Mongolia) was appointed as the Force Commander in 2024, preceded by Ingrid Gjerde (Norway). The current Force Commander is Lt. General Mohammad Asadullah Minhazul Alam of the Bangladesh Army.

Initially, UNFICYP consisted of military and civilian contingents drawn from Australia, Austria, Canada, Denmark, Finland, Ireland, New Zealand, Sweden, and the United Kingdom. However, over its long history the Force has been the subject of various UNSC resolutions and reorganisations, and currently comprises contingents from Argentina, Australia, Austria, Bangladesh, Bosnia-Herzegovina, Brazil, Canada, Chile, Finland, Germany, Ghana, Hungary, India, Indonesia, Ireland, Italy, Jordan, Mongolia, Montenegro, Nepal, the Netherlands, Pakistan, Paraguay, Serbia, Slovakia, Romania, Russia, and the United Kingdom.

As of 31 October 2025, the Mission has a strength 727 military personnel, 60 police officers, and 148 civilian staff. The mandate for UNFICYP was last renewed by the UN Security Council on 30 January 2026 and extended until 31 January 2027. Turkey has criticized all the renewals.

== History ==
United Nations Peacekeeping Force in Cyprus (UNFICYP) is a United Nations peacekeeping force that was established under United Nations Security Council Resolution 186 in 1964 to prevent a recurrence of fighting following intercommunal violence between the Greek Cypriots and Turkish Cypriots, to contribute to the maintenance and restoration of law and order and to facilitate a return to normal conditions.

Following the 1974 Greek Cypriot coup d'état and the Turkish invasion of Cyprus, the United Nations Security Council (UNSC) extended and expanded the mission to prevent the dispute turning into war, and UNFICYP was redeployed to patrol the United Nations Buffer Zone in Cyprus, and assist in the maintenance of the military status quo. Since its establishment, the force has also worked in concert with the Special Representative of the Secretary-General and representatives of the two communities to seek an amicable diplomatic solution to the Cyprus dispute.

On 5 December 2006, the United Nations Secretary-General Kofi Annan recommended a further six-month extension in the mandate of the UN mission that has been deployed on the island for over four decades. Mr. Annan said that while the situation remained "calm and stable with no major violations of the ceasefire lines," he regretted the continued stalemate in the political process and the "missed opportunities" over the past 10 years.

=== Fatalities ===
As of 31 December 2025, UNFICYP has suffered 187 fatalities since 1964, with 145 of these being due to an accident or illness.

Country	Total Deaths
Argentina	4
Australia	3
Austria	16
Bulgaria	1
Canada	29
Cyprus	3
Denmark	24
Finland	13
India	1
Ireland	9
Kenya	1
Slovakia	2
Sweden	17
United Kingdom	60
Undetermined	1

== Deployment ==
UNFICYP is headquartered from the Blue Beret Camp next to the abandoned airport of Nicosia. The current force commander is Lieutenant General Mohammad Asadullah Minhazul Alam of Bangladesh. Force Commander of United Nations Peacekeeping Force in Cyprus.

=== Prior to 1974 ===
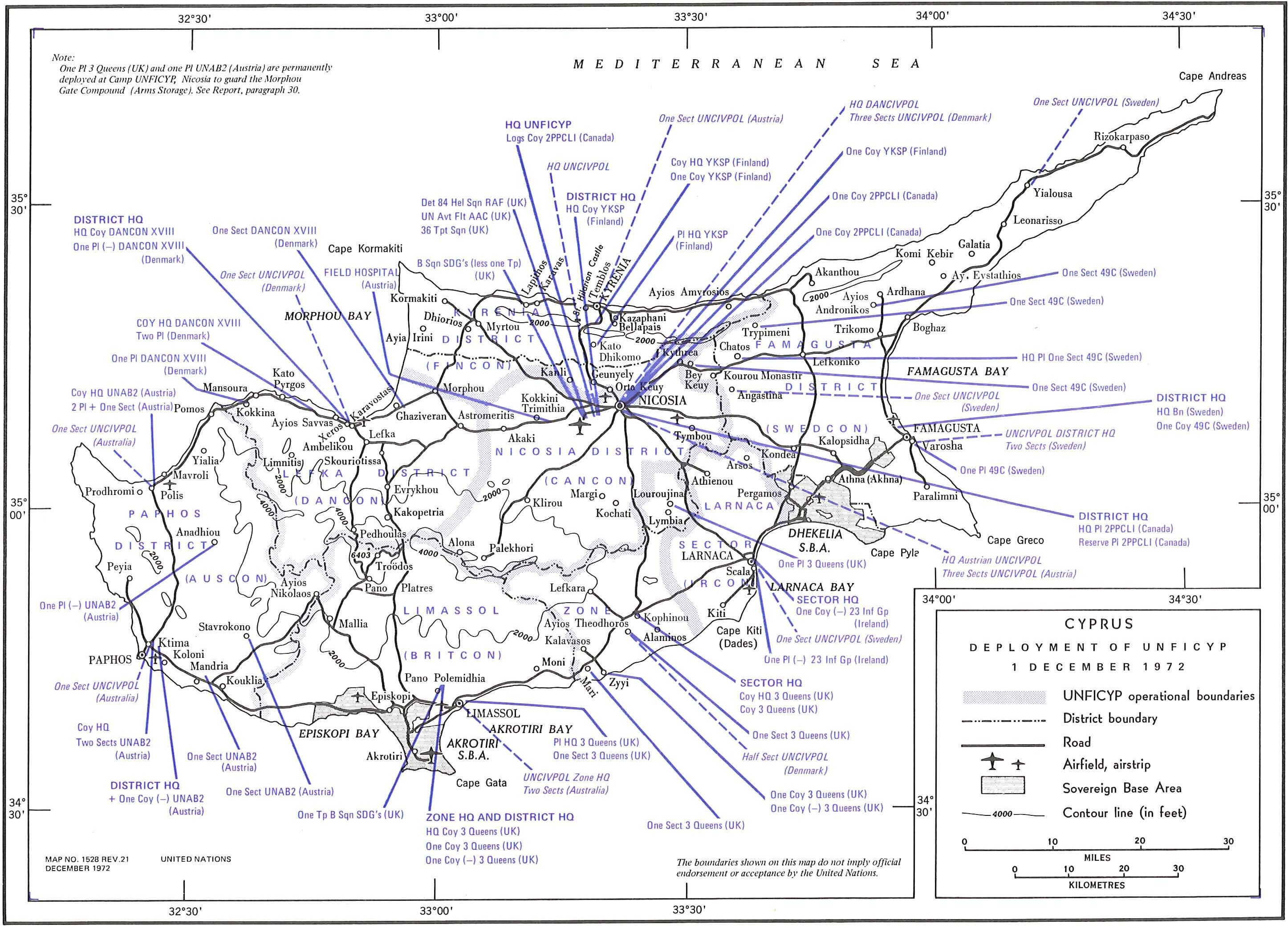
UNFICYP deployments as of December 1972.

Upon UNFICYP's arrival on the island, the national contingents were each assigned a sector, which mostly coincided with the boundaries of the civil districts:

- Paphos District – Austrian contingent
- Lefka District (consisting of the Western part of Nicosia District) – Danish contingent
- Limassol Zone (consisting of Limassol District-New Zealand contingent and the Western half of Larnaka District) – British contingent
- Nicosia District – Canadian contingent
- Larnaca Sector (consisting of the Eastern half of Larnaka District) – Irish contingent
- Kyrenia District – Finnish contingent
- Famagusta District – Swedish contingent

When, in October 1973, the Irish contingent was withdrawn from Cyprus in support of the United Nations Emergency Force during the Yom Kippur War, the Austrian contingent was relocated from Paphos District (which was subsequently absorbed by the British contingent) to Larnaca District to replace them, with the Western half, which had previously been patrolled by the British contingent, absorbed into the Austrian sector.

Canada in UNFICYP – From 15 March 1964 to 15 June 1993, Canada maintained a battalion-sized contingent of peace-support troops in UNFICYP. During this period, the Canadian contingent went through 59 rotations and some 25,000 CAF personnel completed six-month tours on the island. With Denmark, Ireland and Finland, Canada was one of the four original contributors of troops to UNFICYP, committed by the government of Prime Minister Lester B. Pearson on 12 March 1964. The lead elements of the initial rotation of the Canadian contingent arrived on 15 March 1964, followed by a brigade headquarters, the 1st Battalion, Royal 22e Régiment, and a Reconnaissance Squadron from The Royal Canadian Dragoons mounted in Ferret scout cars that were transported to Cyprus by HMCS Bonaventure. By 1993, when Canada withdrew its combat arms contingent from UNFICYP, every infantry battalion of the Regular Force had deployed to Cyprus at least once, and Regular Force artillery and armoured regiments had reorganized for infantry duties to take their turns. The current contribution are small numbers of staff officers on one-year rotations. The operation name “Snowgoose” dates from July 1974, when the Canadian contingent in UNFICYP — originally made up of 1 Commando, Canadian Airborne Regiment, and the Airborne Field Squadron (the combat engineer element of the Canadian Airborne Regiment) — was rapidly augmented by 2 Commando and 3 Commando in response to the Turkish invasion of Cyprus that began on 20 July 1974.

=== Since 1993 ===
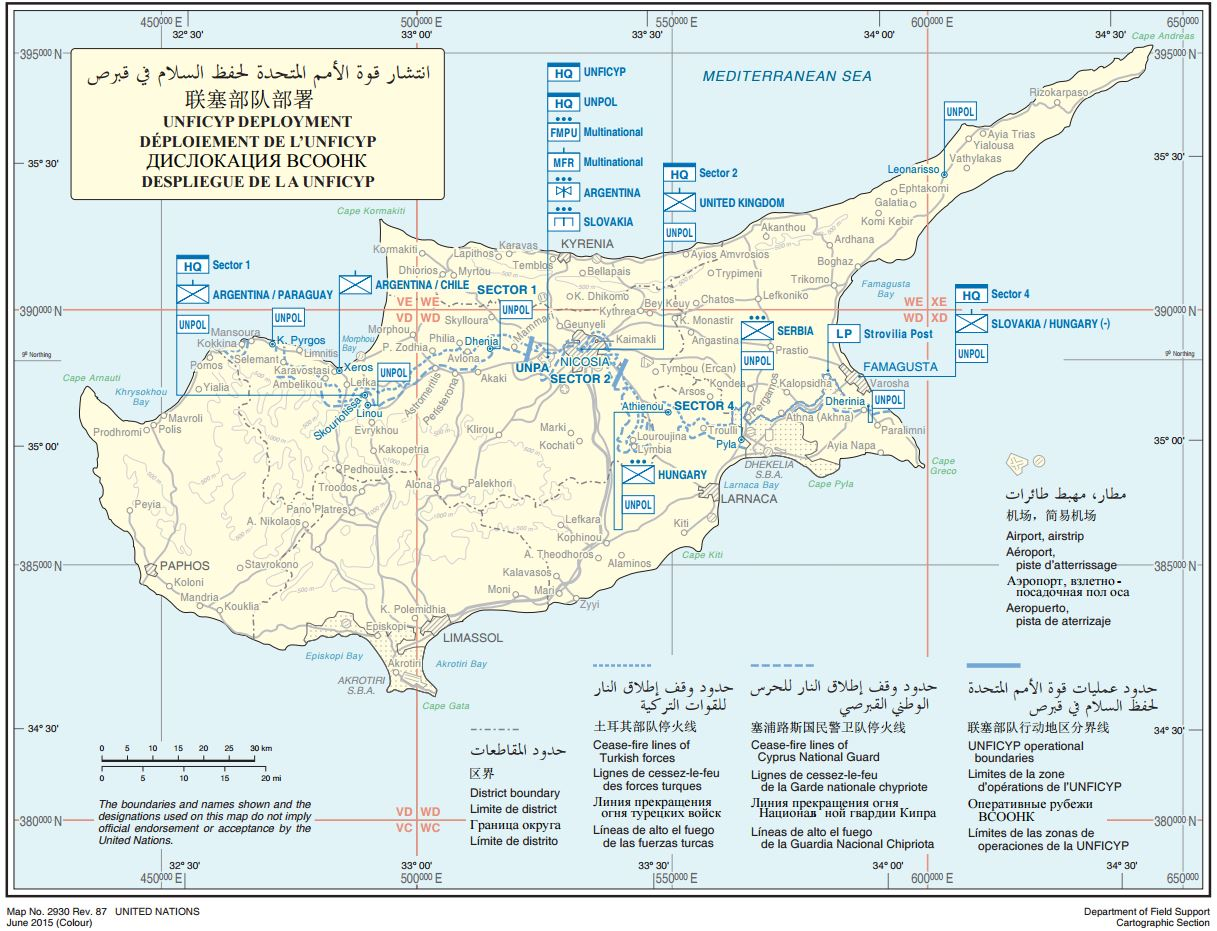
UNFICYP deployment as of 2015

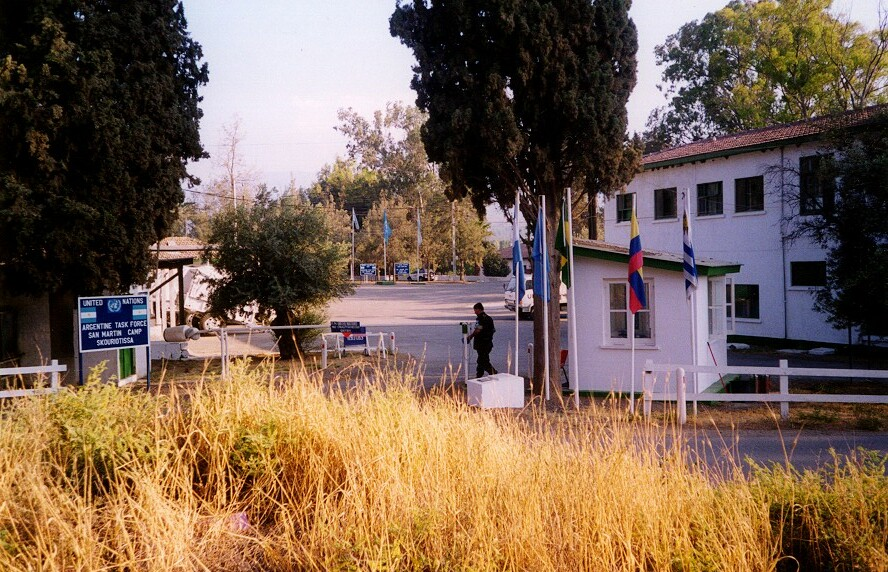
The Argentine Contingent's San Martin Camp

As of 31 May 2012, the total strength (military personnel and civilian police) of UNFICYP was 926 individuals. The 858 military personnel were from Argentina, Austria, Brazil, Canada, Chile, China, Croatia, Hungary, Paraguay, Peru, Serbia, Slovakia and the United Kingdom.

On 31 October 2019, Ghana began contributing to the peacekeeping forces in Cyprus.

UNFICYP's military personnel are mostly divided up into national contingents, with each major contingent being responsible for one of the buffer zone's three remaining sectors. The Argentine contingent includes soldiers from the Argentine military forces, including the Argentine Army and the Argentine Marines, as well as from Brazil, Paraguay and Chile; whereas the Slovak contingent includes soldiers from Croatia.

- Sector 1 starts at Kokkina exclave and covers approximately 90 kilometres to Mammari, west of Nicosia. It has been the responsibility of the Argentinian Contingent since October 1993. Sector One Headquarters and Command Company are located in San Martin Camp, which is near Skouriotissa village. Support Company finds its home at Roca Camp, near Xeros in the north. The two line companies composed of 212 troops are deployed along four permanently manned patrol bases while also conducting mobile patrols from the San Martin and Roca camps.
- Sector 2 starts at Mammari, west of Nicosia and covers 30 kilometres to Kaimakli, east of Nicosia. Since 1993, has been the responsibility of the 183-strong British contingent, which deploys using the name Operation TOSCA.
- Sector 4 (the actual 3rd Sector, but because of UNFICYP history still named Sector 4) starts at Kaimakli, east of Nicosia and covers 65 Kilometres to the village of Dhernia, on the east coast of Cyprus. Since 1993, it has been the responsibility of the Slovak and Hungarian contingent with 202 Soldiers.

In addition to the main sector contingents, there are several other military units under UNFICYP command, including:

- Military Observer Liaison Officers – involved at all levels across the Force in daily negotiations and liaison functions with both opposing forces (OPFOR).
- Force Military Police Unit (FMPU) – one of only two remaining multi-national sub units within UNFICYP, the other being the Mobile Force Reserve. The FMPU is commanded by a major of the UK Royal Military Police (RMP), with 7 other members of the RMP as part of the 25 strong unit. Other contributing nationalities are Argentina (6), Hungary (5) and Slovakia (6).
- Mobile Force Reserve (MFR) – high readiness reserve able to react to any incident anywhere on the island. Formed from the Permanent Force Reserve in 1997, the unit is composed of Argentinean, British, Hungarian and Slovak peacekeepers, a mix of customs and cultures, where the four different nationalities work together. From 1997 until their departure in 2001 a select contingent of each rotation of Austrian soldiers was part of the MFR. The unit is equipped with Alvis Tactica APCs, which are armed with general-purpose machine guns. The MFR is trained in public order and major incident reaction techniques. In addition, the MFR is also trained for air mobile operations using Bell 212 helicopters to rapidly insert into trouble areas.
- The UN Flight (ARGAIR) – the flight is equipped with three helicopters and, since 1994, has been staffed by 28 airmen from the Argentine Air Force. They use Hughes 500 and Bell 212 helicopters and, by 2003, had logged a total of 10,000 flight hours without accident. During the 2006 Israel-Lebanon conflict the Lebanese Prime Minister Fuad Siniora was brought in and out of Lebanon by one of their helicopters.
- Force Engineers – engineering support to UNFICYP is provided by the Integrated Support Services (ISS) and consists of the Chief Engineer (CE), the Force Engineer (FE), the Force Engineer HQ Unit, Support Services Workshop Units, (SSWU) Sector Engineers and Engineering Elements from each contingent.

There are 69 civilian police officers supplied by Brazil, Bosnia and Herzegovina, Jordan, Indonesia, Ireland, Italy, Germany, Montenegro, the Netherlands. In addition, UNFICYP has 147 civilian staff members, 39 of whom were internationally recruited and 108 locally recruited.

UNFICYP military strength (troops and staff officers) as of 31 October 2025:

Country	Strength
Argentina	220
Austria	3
Bangladesh	1
Brazil	2
Canada	1
Chile	6
Ecuador	2
Ghana	1
Hungary	9
India	1
Mongolia	3
Pakistan	2
Paraguay	12
Russian Federation	4
Serbia	6
Slovakia	219
Slovenia	6
United Kingdom	234
18	732

== Buffer Zone ==
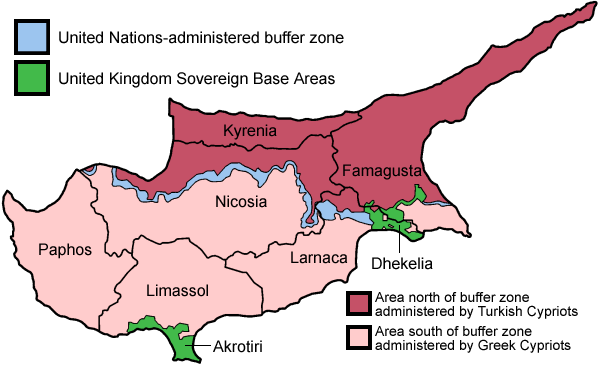
The UN buffer zone is shown in light blue on the map

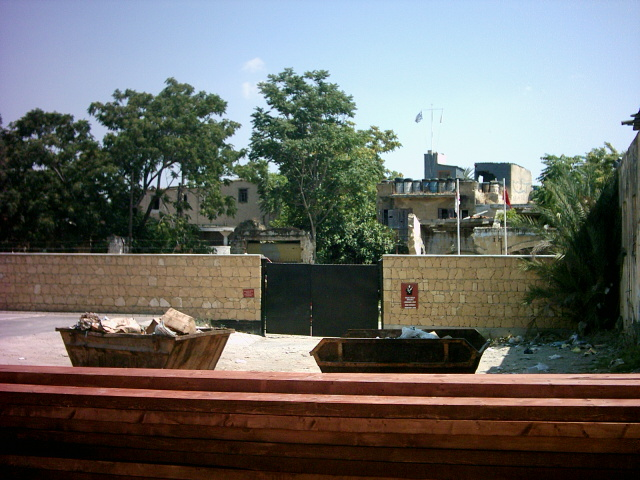
The buffer zone near Nicosia's Paphos Gate

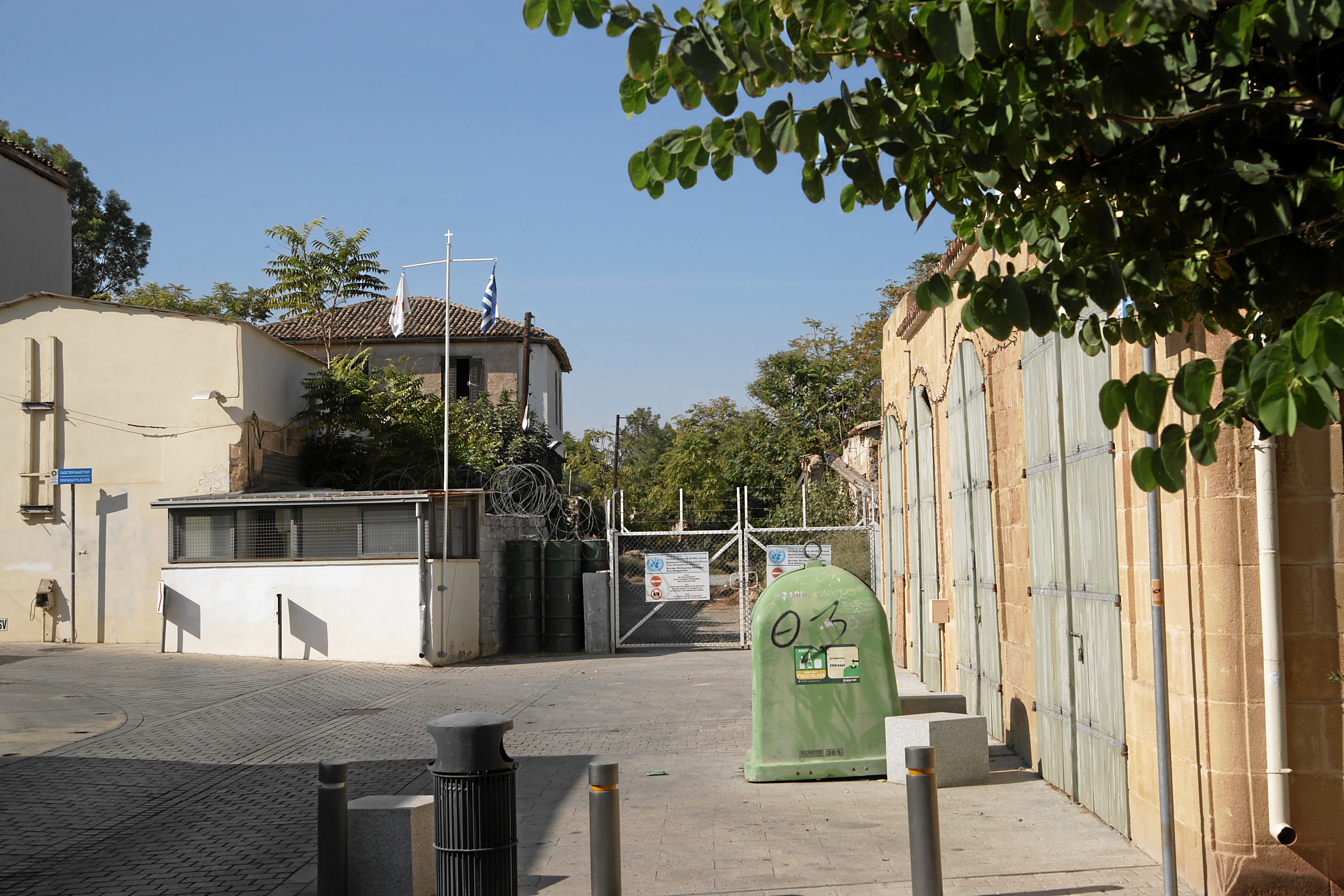
Gate in the UN buffer zone

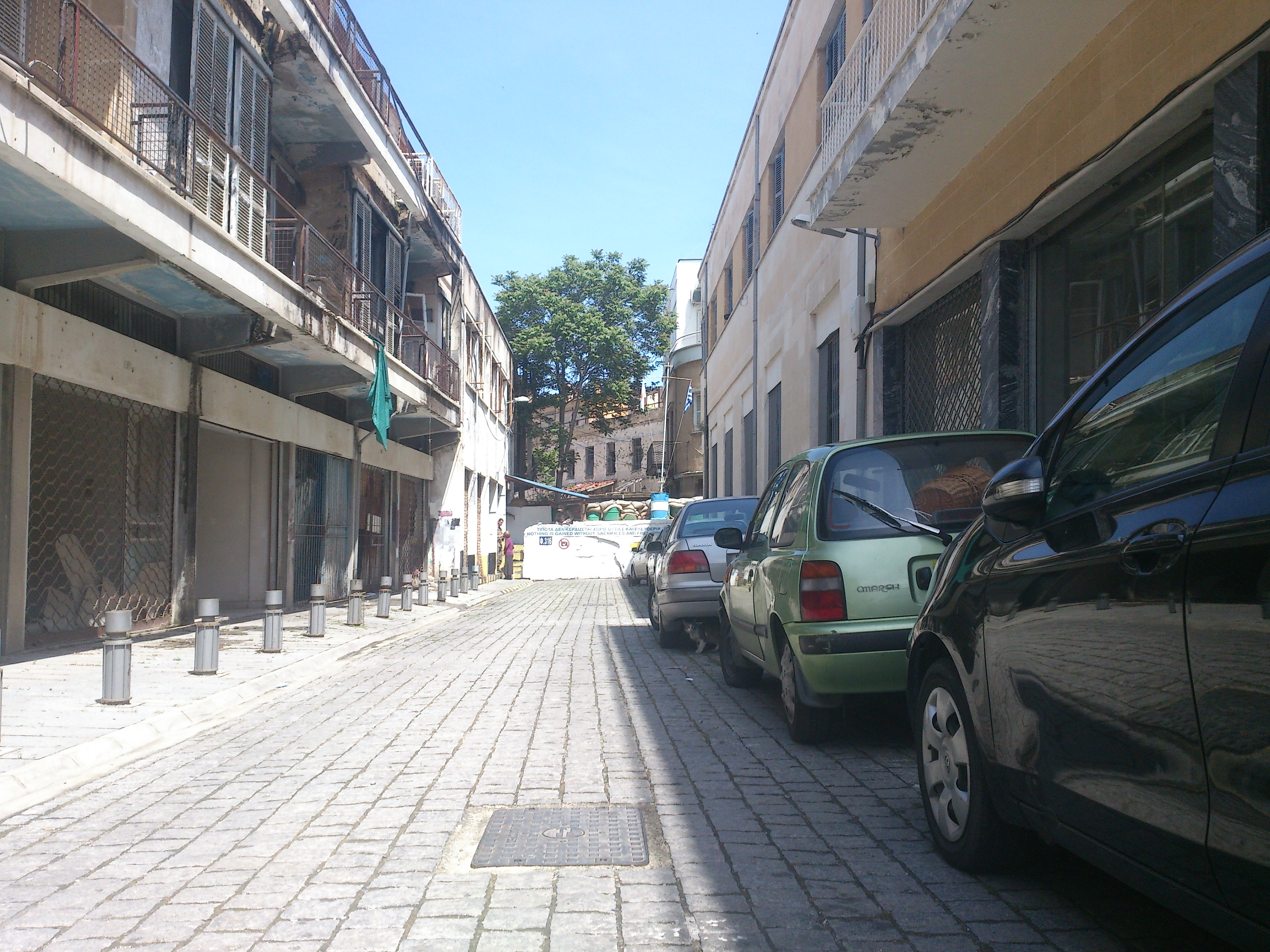
Nicosia guard post in the UN buffer zone

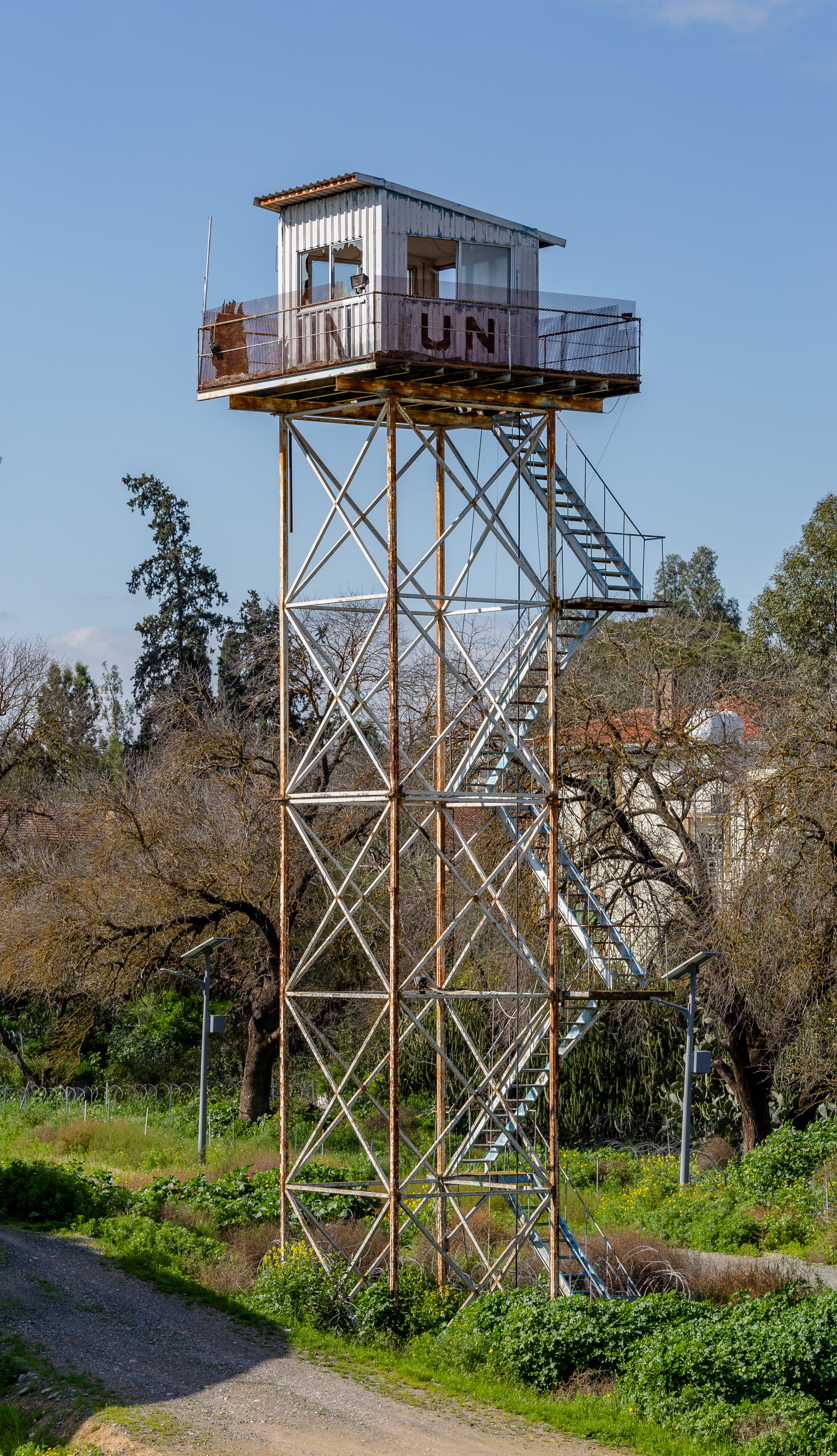
UN tower in the buffer zone

The United Nations Buffer Zone in Cyprus is a demilitarised zone, patrolled by UNFICYP, that was established in 1974 following the Turkish invasion of Cyprus, and de facto partitions the island into the area controlled by the Government of Cyprus (which is the de jure government for the entire island save for the British Sovereign Base Areas) in the south and that under the illegal Turkish occupation in the north. The zone runs for more than 180.5 kilometres (112.2 mi) along what is colloquially known as the Green Line and has an area of 346 square kilometres (134 sq mi).

The zone stretches for 180 km from the western part of near Kato Pyrgos to the east just south of Famagusta. It cuts through the center of the old town of Nicosia, separating the city into southern and northern sections. There is also a buffer zone around the Kokkina exclave in western Cyprus. The width of the zone ranges from 3.3 metres (11 ft) in central Nicosia, to 7.4 kilometres (4.6 mi) at the village of Athienou. There is no buffer zone along the common border between the eastern British Sovereign Base Area and the area under the Republic of Cyprus control or Turkish Army control.

The buffer zone is home to some 10,000 people and there are several villages and farms located within. The village of Pyla is famous for being the only village in Cyprus where Greek Cypriots and Turkish Cypriots live side by side. Other villages are Dhenia, Mammari, Athienou and Troulli while Lymbia lies partially within the zone.

Turkish forces built a barrier on the zone's northern side, consisting mainly of barbed-wire fencing, concrete wall segments, watchtowers, anti-tank ditches, and minefields. This line is also referred to as the Attila Line on some maps, named after the Turkish code-name for the 1974 military invasion: Operation Atilla. The closed off zone has become a haven for Cyprus' wildlife, an example of an involuntary park.

== Finances ==
The annual cost for maintaining UNFICYP is estimated at US$57,390,000. This includes the voluntary contribution by the Government of Cyprus of one third of the cost of the force and the annual amount of US$6,500,000 contributed by the Government of Greece. Turkey does not directly contribute to the force's budget. The operational cost of UNFICYP just during the period from 16 June 1993 to 31 October 2010 was US$2.91 billion.

== Controversies ==
=== Neutrality of UNFICYP ===
UNFICYP's neutrality mandate dictates the erasure of signs, flags, and emblems in spaces under its authority.

The fact that a third of UNFICYP's budget is covered by one party to the conflict (RoC; i.e., the Greek Cypriots) and one Guarantor (Greece) calls into question the UN's neutrality and constitutes “a conflict of interest" One interlocutor acknowledged that the way the budget of UNFICYP is organized "opens [UNFICYP] to criticism." One added: "How can we be impartial if we take part of the budget from one side?"

In January 2022, around a handball match between Cyprus and Turkey in the qualification for the 2024 European Championship, the decision of the Greek Cypriots not to allow a Turkish player who had tested positive with COVID-19 to be brought to Northern Cyprus with all the safety measures taken was criticized by the de facto TRNC Ministry of Foreign Affairs. The ministry also criticized the UNFICYP for not playing a "facilitating role" to in the Turkish team's request, claiming "UNFICYP has moved away from the principle of neutrality, which is one of the most fundamental elements of peace operations, and has become a symbol of the status quo that serves the interests of the Greek Cypriot side." The player was eventually flown to Turkey instead.

Soydemir noted that "not the organization but the individuals can be affected by this approach and their neutrality might be hampered naturally."

=== Removal of UNFICYP from Northern Cyprus ===
In July 2018, the Turkish Cypriot president, Mustafa Akinci, called for a separate State of Force Agreement (SOFA) between Northern Cyprus and UNFICYP, and sent a letter to the UN Security Council for the reassessment of the UNFICYP's mandate and stated that UNFICYP continues to cooperate with the authorities of Northern Cyprus absent a legal basis and specified that Northern Cyprus stood ready to prepare a document with the UN dealing with all aspects of their relations.

In October 2022, UNFICYP was given an ultimatum by Northern Cyprus (the de facto administration in the north) demanding it recognize the Turkish Republic of Northern Cyprus or to leave the 2 bases it currently has in the north. Ersin Tatar, the president of Northern Cyprus, stated that in line with the Brahimi Report of the UN, the consent of Northern Cyprus for the stationing of UNFICYP is a must. Tahsin Ertuğruloğlu, the foreign minister of Northern Cyprus, stated that the deadline for the ultimatum for requesting the approval of Northern Cyprus for the operations of UNFICYP in Northern Cyprus is the end of October 2022.

On 28 September 2023, Turkey called for a written agreement between Northern Cyprus and UNFICYP regarding relations between the two. Turkey said "An agreement is necessary to delimit the functions of UNFICYP vis a vis its interactions with Northern Cyprus. The attitude and practice of double standards by UNFICYP regarding the sovereignty of the TRNC and regarding the most fundamental humanitarian needs of Turkish Cypriots, are incompatible with UNFICYP’s obligation to remain neutral and they damage its prestige. In this context, it was noted that once again the need has arisen for the activities of the peacekeeping forces in the TRNC to be placed on a legal basis through a written agreement with the authorities of the TRNC. Turkey will continue to guarantee security and peace for Turkish Cypriots in the context of Turkey’s rights emanating from international law and treaties."

== See also ==
- Cypriot refugees
- Republic of Cyprus
- Turkish Republic of Northern Cyprus
- United Nations High Commissioner for Refugees Representation in Cyprus
