= Mammari =

Mammari: Μάμμαρι (Greek); Mammari (Turkish)
- Location in Cyprus
- Coordinates: 35°10′27″N 33°12′10″E
- Country: Cyprus
- District: Nicosia District

Government
  - Mayor: Odysseas Koumoulis

Population (2001)
  - Total: 1,052
- Time zone: UTC+2 (EET)
  - Summer (DST): UTC+3 (EEST)

Mammari (Greek: Μάμμαρι; Turkish: Mammari) is a village located in the Nicosia District of Cyprus north of Kokkinotrimithia and partly within the UN Buffer Zone.
