= Troulloi =

Troulloi Τρούλλοι
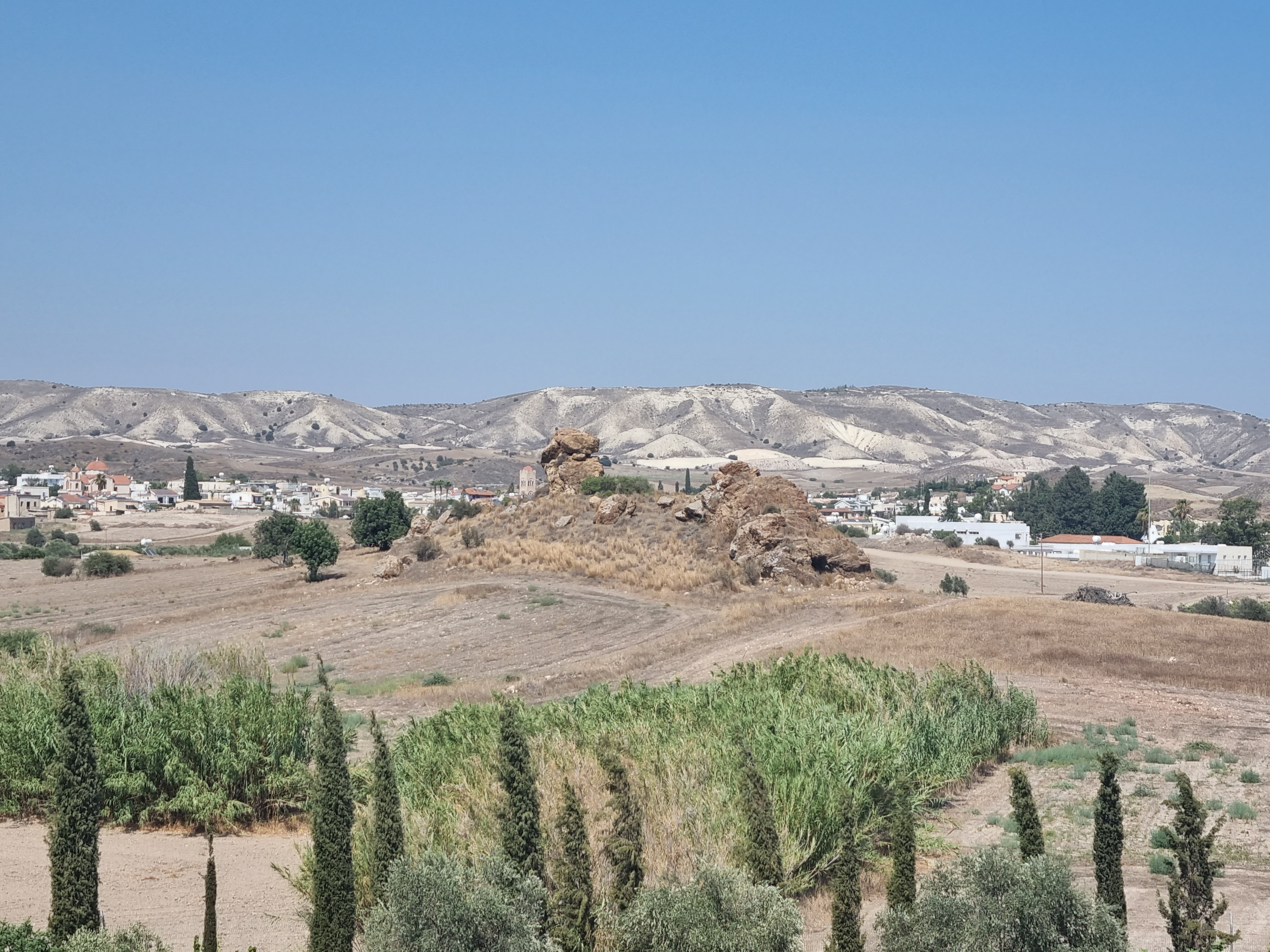
- View of Troulloi from the Panagia Rodon to Amaranton Monastery

- Location in Cyprus
- Coordinates: 35°1′55″N 33°36′54″E
- Country: Cyprus
- District: Larnaca District

Population (2011)
  - Total: 1,175
- Time zone: UTC+2 (EET)
  - Summer (DST): UTC+3 (EEST)

Troulloi or Troulli (Greek: Τρούλλοι, locally [ˈtrulːi]) is a village in the Larnaca District, Cyprus. It is one of only four villages located within the United Nations Buffer Zone, the other three being Pyla, Athienou and Deneia. In 2011 Troulloi had a population of 1,175 people according to the Statistical Service of the Republic of Cyprus, 2014-04-17. The village's patron saint is Άγιος Μάμας (Saint Mamas), celebrated on 2 September each year.
