= Ingrid Margrethe Gjerde =

Norwegian military officer

Ingrid Margrethe Gjerde Ingrid Margrethe Gjerde
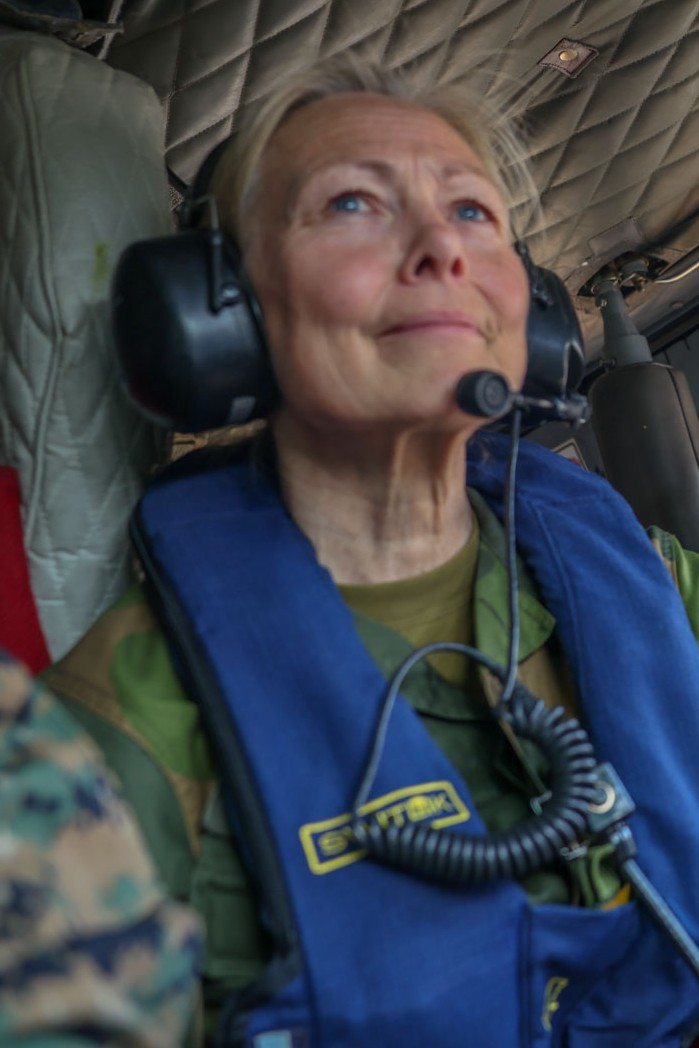
- Born: 29 July 1968 (age 58); Bærum, Norway
- Education: University of Oslo; United States Army Command and General Staff College
- Military career
- Commands: Norwegian Military Academy (2013–2016); UNFICYP (2021–2023); Norwegian Defence Staff (2023–)
- Awards: Defence Service Medal with Laurel Branch; Defence Service Medal with two stars; Defence Medal for International Operations with one star; Medal for Defence Operations Abroad – Afghanistan II; Military Service Medal Army with three stars; Order of the cavalier of Madara; United Nations Medal – UNIFIL 2; United Nations Medal – UNFICYP 4; NATO Medal – ISAF; NATO medal for the former Yugoslavia; Norwegian Veterans' Association for International Operations Badge of Honour; Oslo Military Society Badge of Honour; Norwegian defence shooting badge; Norwegian defence military sports badge with Laurel Branch; Cross for the Four Day Marches

Ingrid Margrethe Gjerde (born 29 July 1968) is a Norwegian military officer with the rank of lieutenant general. Since 2023 she has been head of the Norwegian Defence Staff.

== Career ==
Born in Bærum on 29 July 1968, Gjerde has Norwegian military education, a degree in political science from the University of Oslo, and further education from the United States Army Command and General Staff College.

From 2006 to 2009 she was chief of His Majesty the King's Guard, the first woman in this position. She was head of the Norwegian Military Academy from 2013, and chief of staff of the Norwegian Army from 2016 to 2018, the first women in both these positions.

From 2021 to 2023 she headed the United Nations Peacekeeping Force in Cyprus (UNFICYP).

She was promoted to lieutenant general and appointed chief of the Defence Staff in 2023, succeeding Elisabeth Natvig.
