= Patrick Thursby =

Brigadier Patrick Thursby OBE

Personal details
- Born: Patrick Dehany Francis Thursby; 29 December 1922 Belfast
- Died: 9 July 1994 (aged 71) Surrey

Military service
- Allegiance: United Kingdom
- Branch/service: British Army
- Years of service: 1941–1973
- Rank: Brigadier
- Battles/wars: Second World War

Brigadier Patrick Dehany Francis Thursby, OBE; 29 December 1922 – July 1994) was a British officer who served in the Second World War and played a major role in devising and establishing the Green Line in Cyprus.

== Life and career ==
Thursby was born in Belfast, the son of Francis Delany Victor Thursby, an officer in the Suffolk Regiment who was stationed in Belfast during the Troubles of 1922. Educated at Cheltenham College, he joined the Royal Corps of Signals as a soldier in 1941 before commissioning into the Royal Engineers. During the Second World War he was posted to India, where he served in Burma and transferred to his father's regiment.

After the war he became Adjutant of the 2nd Battalion, before commanding B Company in Ferozapore at the time that India was partitioned in August 1947. In 1952 he transferred into the Parachute Regiment, commanding C Company 3 PARA in Egypt, before commanding C Company with the 1st Battalion of the Suffolk Regiment fighting the EOKA terrorists in Cyprus in 1956. In 1962 he was given command of 1 PARA, taking them to Bahrain and Cyprus. It was here that he assisted with devising the Green Line, for which he was later appointed an OBE. Promoted to Brigadier in 1967, he commanded 44th (TA) Parachute Brigade and retired from active service in 1973.

After he retired from the active list, he headed up the Army Sports Control Board for 15 years before retiring fully in 1988. He also held the position of Chairman of the Army Parachute Association, was appointed Honorary Colonel of 10th Parachute Battalion and was elected a Freeman of the City of London.
