= Pano Pyrgos =

Village in Nicosia District, Cyprus

Pano Pyrgos: Πάνω Πύργος (Greek); Yukarı Pirgo (Turkish)
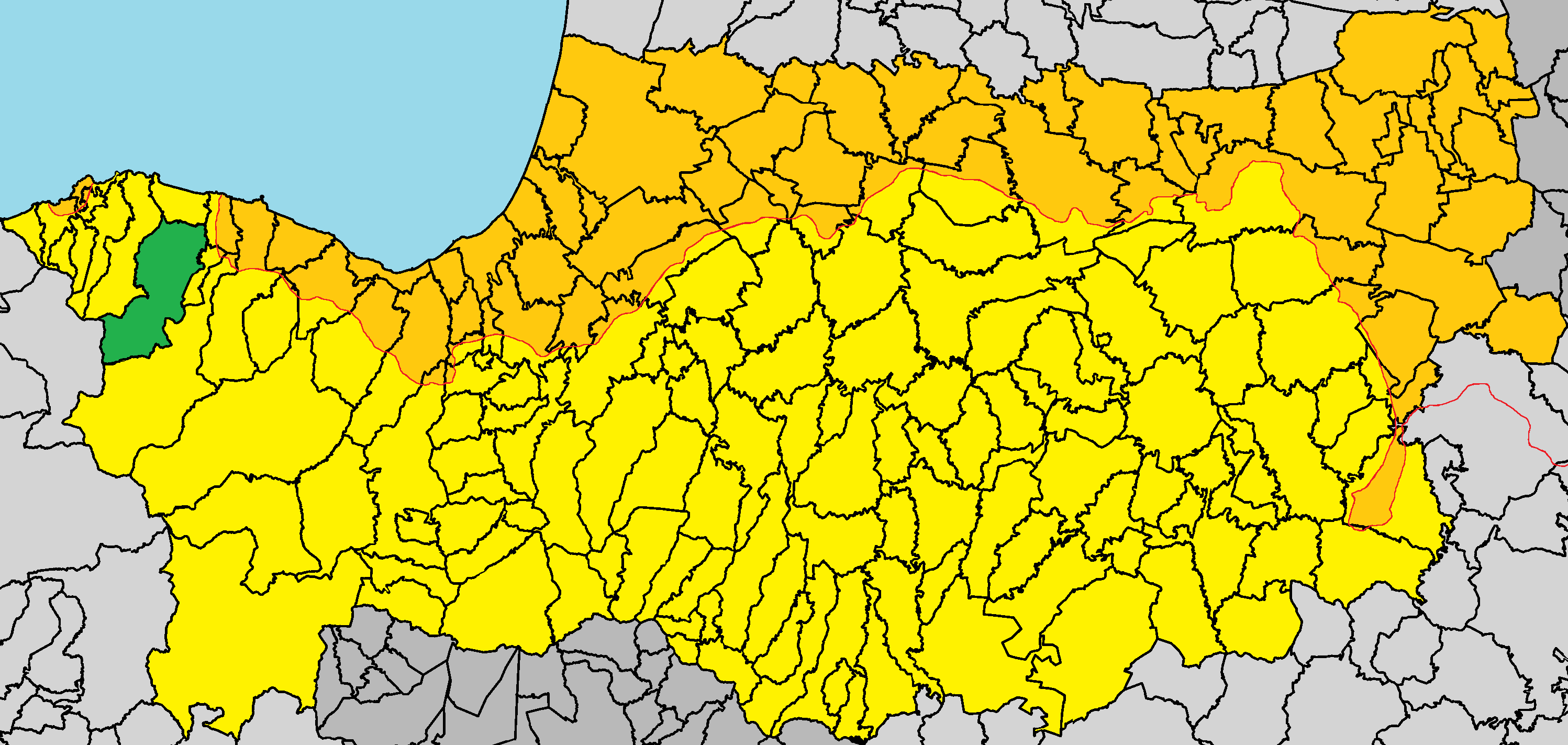
- Pano Pyrgos in Nicosia District

- Location in Cyprus
- Coordinates: 35°09′15″N 32°40′54″E
- Country: Cyprus
- District: Nicosia District

Population (2011)
  - Total: 22
- Time zone: UTC+2 (EET)
  - Summer (DST): UTC+3 (EEST)

Pano Pyrgos (Greek: Πάνω Πύργος; Turkish: Yukarı Pirgo) is a village in Cyprus. It is controlled by the Republic of Cyprus. Due to its location, being surrounded by the Troodos Mountains, the Turkish controlled exclave of Kokkina, and the Green Line, it is rather isolated and difficult to reach and gets significant numbers of visitors only in August during summer vacation.
