= Kato Pyrgos =

Village in Nicosia District, Cyprus

Kato Pyrgos: Κάτω Πύργος (Greek); Aşağı Pirgo (Turkish)
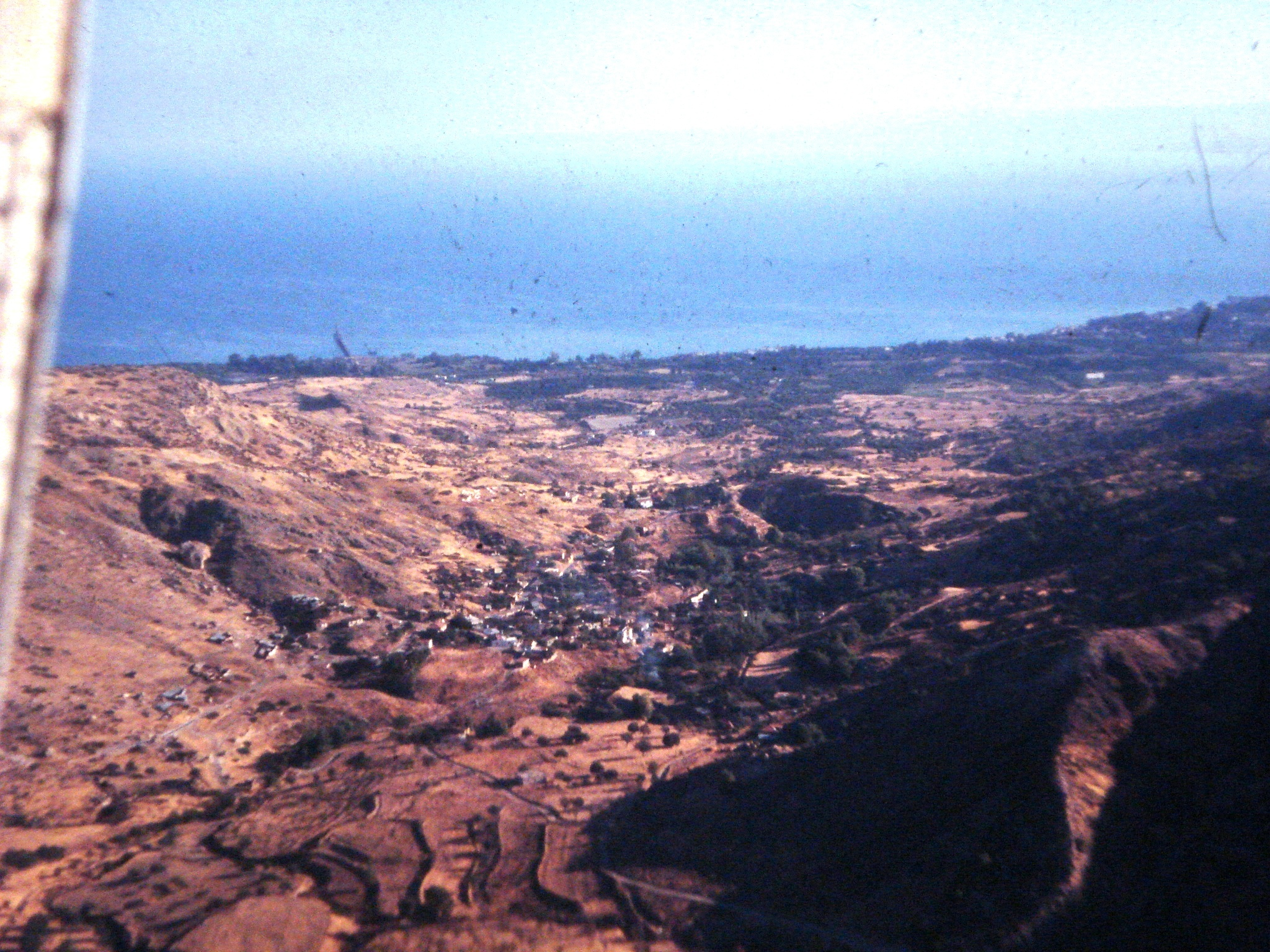
- Kato Pyrgos

- Location in Cyprus
- Coordinates: 35°10′52″N 32°41′08″E
- Country: Cyprus
- District: Nicosia District

Population (2011)
  - Total: 1,036
- Time zone: UTC+2 (EET)
  - Summer (DST): UTC+3 (EEST)

Kato Pyrgos (Greek: Κάτω Πύργος; Turkish: Aşağı Pirgo) is a village in Cyprus. Kato Pyrgos is the only Greek Cypriot village located on Morphou Bay that is controlled by the Republic of Cyprus.

Due to its location, being surrounded by the Troodos Mountains, the Turkish controlled exclave of Kokkina, and the Green Line, it is rather isolated and difficult to reach, and gets significant numbers of visitors only in August during summer vacation.

A Green Line crossing point was opened near Kato Pyrgos on 18 October 2010 to facilitate travel from there to Nicosia.

== Notable Places ==
- Church Panagia Galoktistis
