= Norwegian Veterans' Association for International Operations =

The Norwegian Veterans' Association for International Operations (NVIO) (Norwegian: Norges Veteranforbund for Internasjonale Operasjoner), is an organization of Norwegian veterans of military operations outside Norway, under the command of United Nations and NATO, founded in 1961. Membership has passed 7200, and it is the largest of the organizations for veterans in Norway.

== History ==
Its first name was ”Norske militære FN-observatørers landsforbund” (English: Norwegian Military UN Observers' National Association). Later this was changed to ”FN-befalets landforbund" (English: UN Officers' National Association), and in 1988 it was changed again, this time to ”FN-veteranenes Landsforbund" (FNVLF) (English: The UN Veterans' National Association) also opening up the organization for membership for regular soldiers.
