= Athienou =

Athienou Αθηένου, Αθηαίνου (Greek)
- Municipality
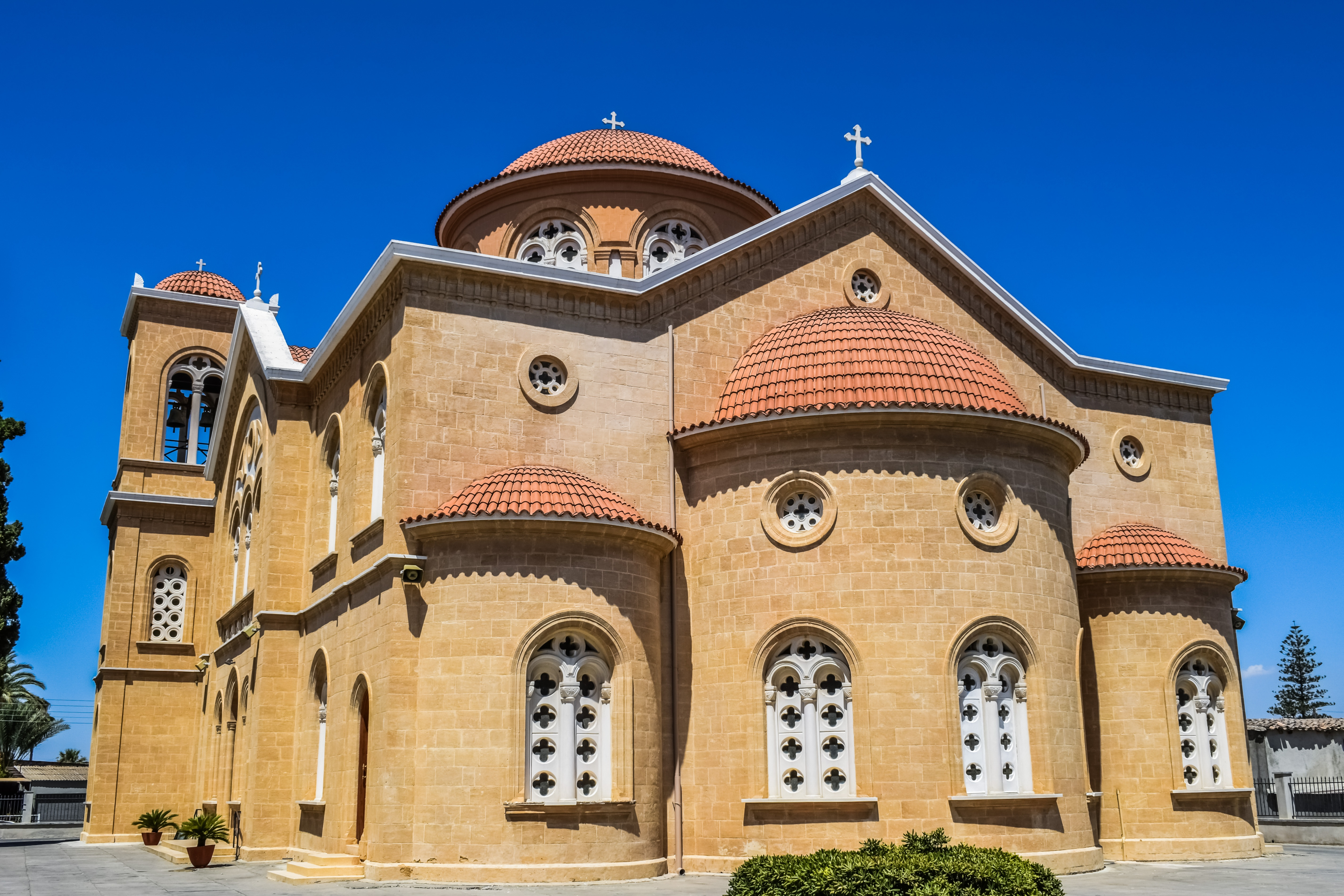
- Church of Panayia Chriseleousa

- Location within Cyprus
- Coordinates: 35°04′N 33°32′E
- Country: Cyprus
- District: Larnaca District

Government
  - Mayor: Kyriakos Kareklas

Population (2021)
  - Total: 9,721
- Time zone: UTC+2 (EET)
  - Summer (DST): UTC+3 (EEST)
- Postal code: 7600
- Website: www.athienou.org.cy

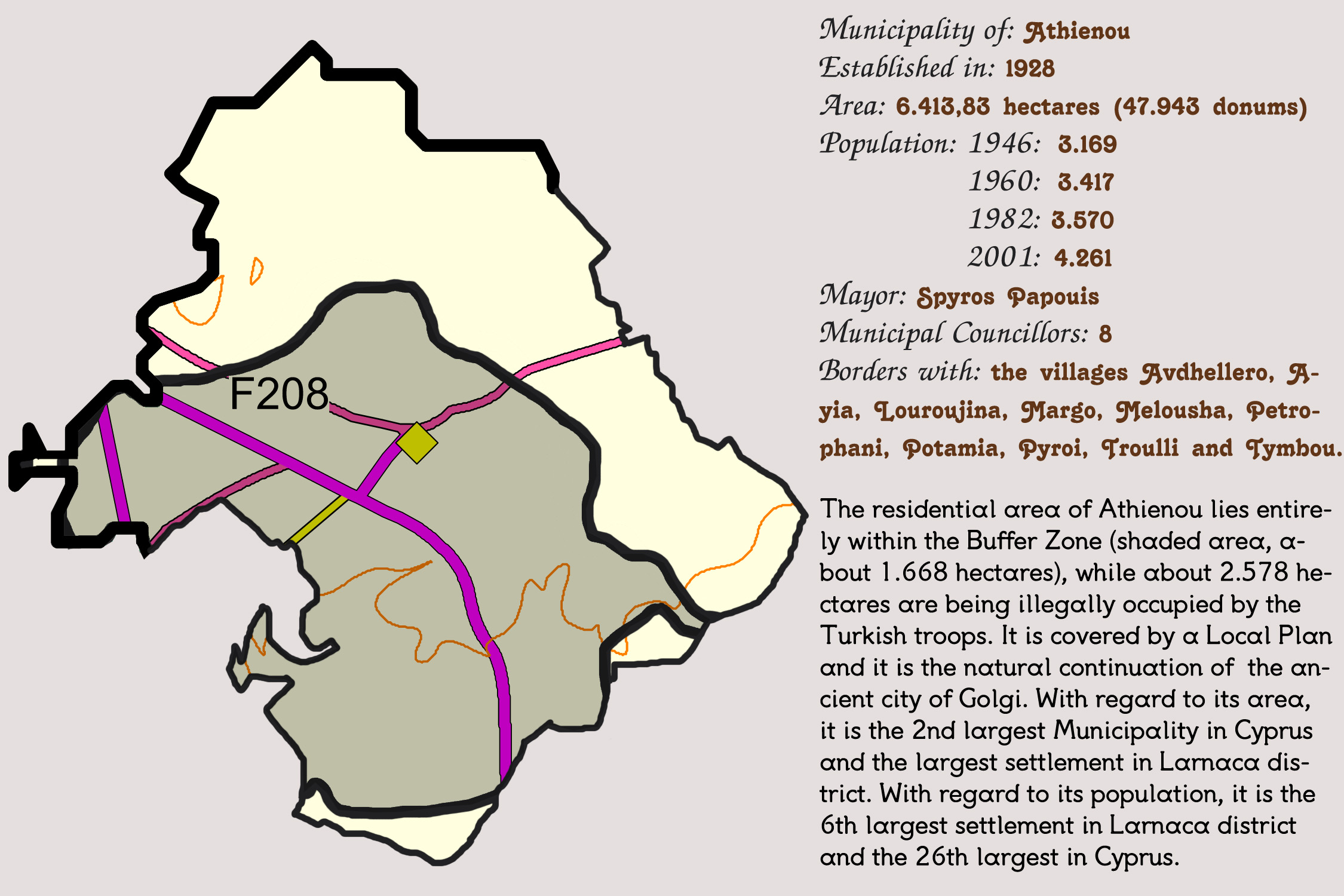
Concise presentation of Athienou

Athienou (Greek: Αθηένου or Αθηαίνου, locally [aθiˈenu]) is a village in Larnaca District, Cyprus. It is one of only four villages located within the United Nations Buffer Zone, the other three being: Pyla, Troulloi and Deneia. Today, Athienou has a population of around 10,000 people. Since 1990, it has been home to Davidson College's Athienou Archaeological Project. The town's city hall includes a museum of local history and culture that was established in 2008.

== Toponymy ==
It is considered by many, that the name of the village Athienou, derived from the ancient Greek word, "Atta" (Greek: Αττα) or "Atha" (Greek: Αθθα), meaning large rock, which characterized the rocky land of the village. According to another theory, the name derives from a Lusignan called Étienne, who lived in the area, and the people who lived in the village were mentioning his house as "Etienne's Place" (Greek: "Στου Ετιένου", stou etiennou), and in later years that changed into Athienou.

== History ==
It has been a settlement since Middle Bronze Age. In ancient time, the town Golgoi [el] existed near modern Athienou.

Golgoi was traditionally said to have been founded by Golgos from Sikyon in the Peloponnese. This link is reinforced by an archaic limestone relief discovered at the site and now housed in the Metropolitan Museum of Art in New York. The relief depicts a Chimaera, a symbol associated with Sikyon and featured on its coinage.

== Notable people from Athienou ==
- Archbishop George III of Cyprus
