= Mohammad Asadullah Minhazul Alam =

Bangladesh army general

Minhazul Alam
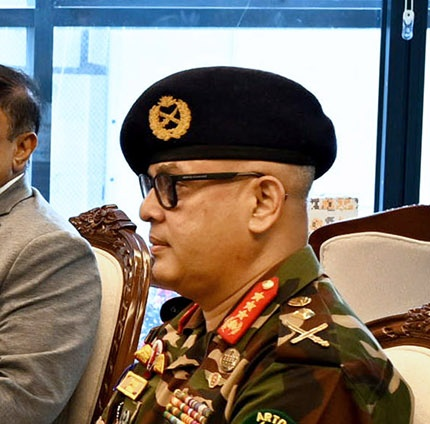
- Alam in 2026
- Born: 1971 (age 54–55); Anwara,Chittagong
- Education: Bangladesh Military Academy
- Military career
- Allegiance: Bangladesh
- Branch: Bangladesh Army
- Service years: 1991–present
- Rank: Lieutenant General
- Unit: East Bengal Regiment
- Commands: Force Commander, UNFICYP; GOC of ARTDOC; GOC of 10th Infantry Division; Commandant of Defence Services Command and Staff College; Managing Director of Bangladesh Machine Tools Factory; Commandant of Bangladesh Infantry Regimental Centre
- Awards: Maroon Parachute Wing, Sword of Honour (BMA)

Mohammad Asadullah Minhazul Alam is a three-star general and Force Commander of UNFICYP. Prior to that, he served as GOC of the ARTDOC of Bangladesh Army and before that as GOC of the 10th Infantry Division and area commander, Cox's Bazar Area. He also served as Commandant of the Defence Services Command and Staff College (DSCSC).

== Military career ==
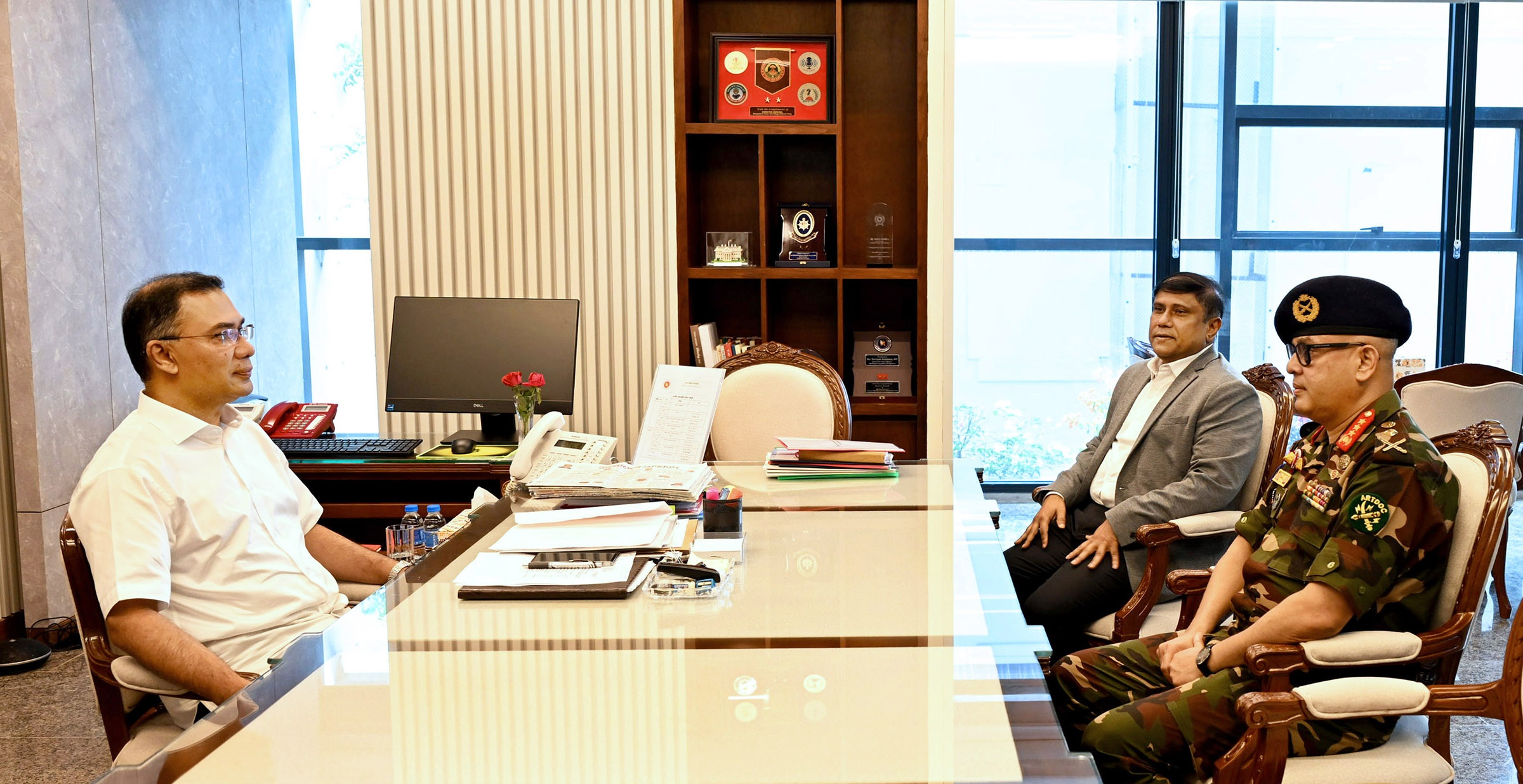
Alam meeting PM Tarique Rahman before departing for Cyprus

Alam was commissioned with the 25th BMA LC in the Corps of Infantry on 20 December 1991. He won the Sword of Honour in the Bangladesh Military Academy for the best all-round performance, besides winning the prestigious Tactics Plaque for best performance in training on military tactics. He also topped the Army Commando Course - 6.

As brigadier, he briefly served as the chief instructor of the Defence Services Command and Staff College. Afterwards, he was promoted to major general and made the Managing Director of the Bangladesh Machine Tools Factory. He was later made Commandant of the Mirpur Staff College in 2024. He most recently served as GOC of the 10th Infantry Division.

After serving as GOC of ARTDOC, he was appointed as the Force Commander of UNFICYP.

=== UN Mission ===
Alam served in United Nations peacekeeping missions, as Sector Commander in United Nations Multidimensional Integrated Stabilization Mission in the Central African Republic (MINUSCA) (2020-2021) and Military Observer in United Nations Transitional Administration in East Timor (UNTAET) (1999-2000).

On 9 April 2026 UN Secretary-General António Guterres appointed Lieutenant General Minhazul Alam as Force Commander of the United Nations Peacekeeping Force in Cyprus (UNFICYP).
