= United Nations Buffer Zone in Cyprus =

UN-administered demilitarised zone on Cyprus

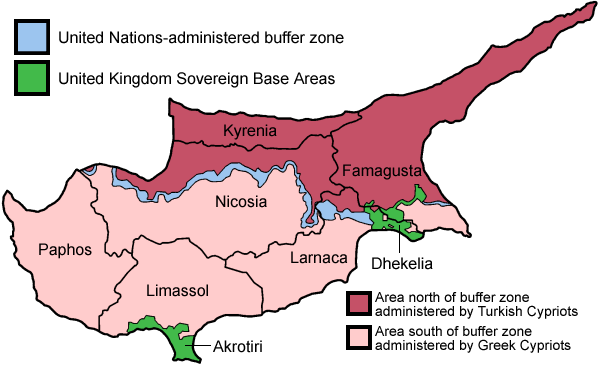
- The UN Buffer Zone is shown in light blue on the map.
- Formation: 4 March 1964
- Type: Demilitarized zone (until 1990)
- Special Representative: Khassim Diagne
- Commander: Maj. Gen. Mohammad Asadullah Minhazul Alam
- Parent organization: United Nations Peacekeeping Force in Cyprus

The United Nations Buffer Zone in Cyprus is a former demilitarized zone, patrolled by the United Nations Peacekeeping Force in Cyprus (UNFICYP), that was established between 1964 and 1990. It was extended on 9 August after the Battle of Tillyria and extended again in 1974 after the ceasefire of 16 August 1974, following the Turkish invasion of Cyprus and the de facto partition of the island into the area controlled by the Republic of Cyprus (excluding the British Sovereign Base Areas) and the largely unrecognized Turkish Republic of Northern Cyprus in the north. The zone, also known as the Green Line (Greek: Πράσινη Γραμμή, Prasini Grammi; Turkish: Yeşil Hat), stretches for 180 kilometres (112 miles) from Paralimni in the east to Kato Pyrgos in the west, where a separate section surrounds Kokkina.

The dividing line is also referred to as the Attila Line, named after Turkey's 1974 military invasion, codenamed Operation Attila. The Turkish army has built a barrier on the zone's northern side, consisting mainly of barbed-wire fencing, concrete wall segments, watchtowers, anti-tank ditches, and minefields. The zone cuts through the centre of Nicosia, separating the city into southern and northern sections. In total, it spans an area of 346 square kilometres (134 sq mi), varying in width from less than 20 metres (66 ft) to more than 7 kilometres (4.3 mi). After the fall of the Berlin Wall in 1989, Nicosia remains the last divided capital in Europe. Some 10,000 people live in several villages and work on farms located within the zone; the village of Pyla is famous for being one of the few remaining villages in Cyprus where Greek and Turkish Cypriots still live side by side. Other villages are Deneia, Athienou, and Troulloi. Some areas are untouched by human interference and have remained a safe haven for flora and fauna.

== History ==
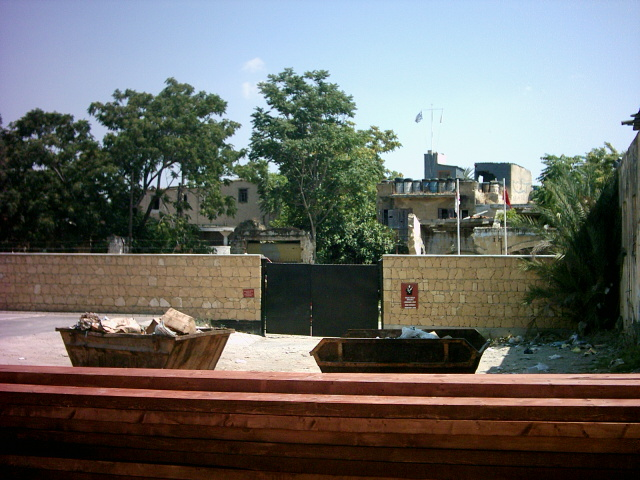
View from the Turkish Cypriot side to the Greek Cypriot side at Uray sk, next to the Turkish Public Market

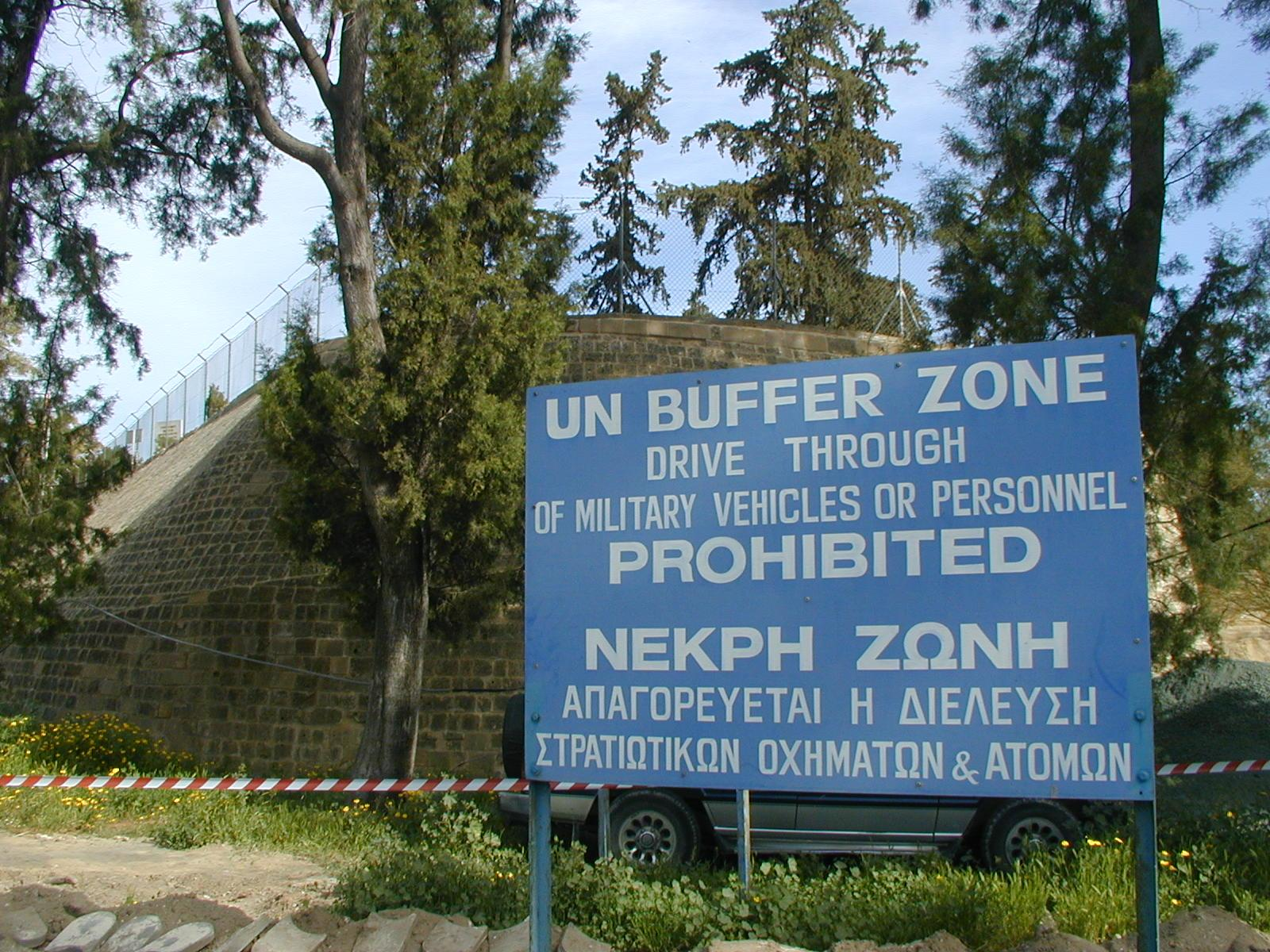
UN Buffer Zone warning sign on the Greek Cypriot side near Ledra crossing, with a view towards the Turkish side

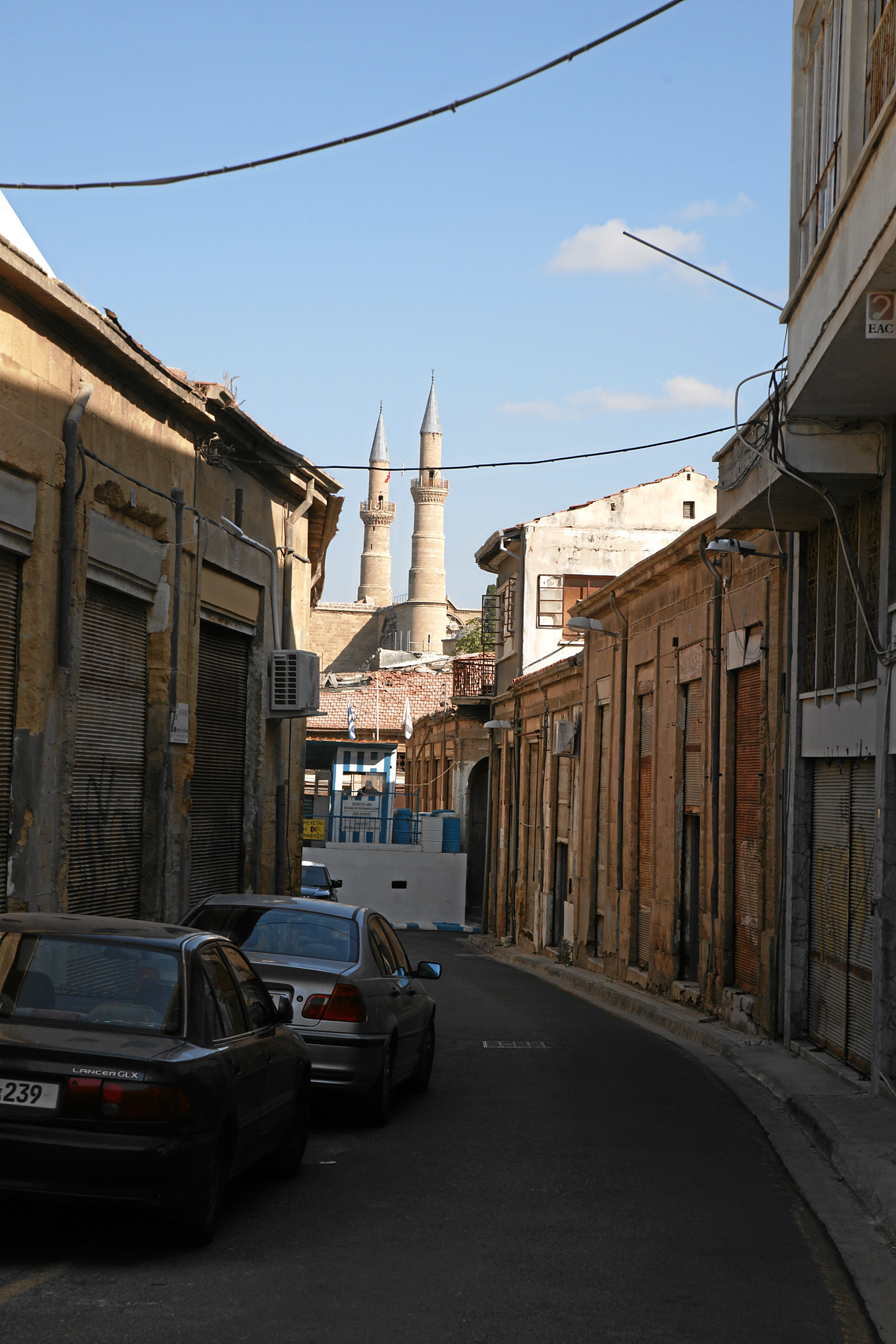
UN buffer zone guard post in Nicosia

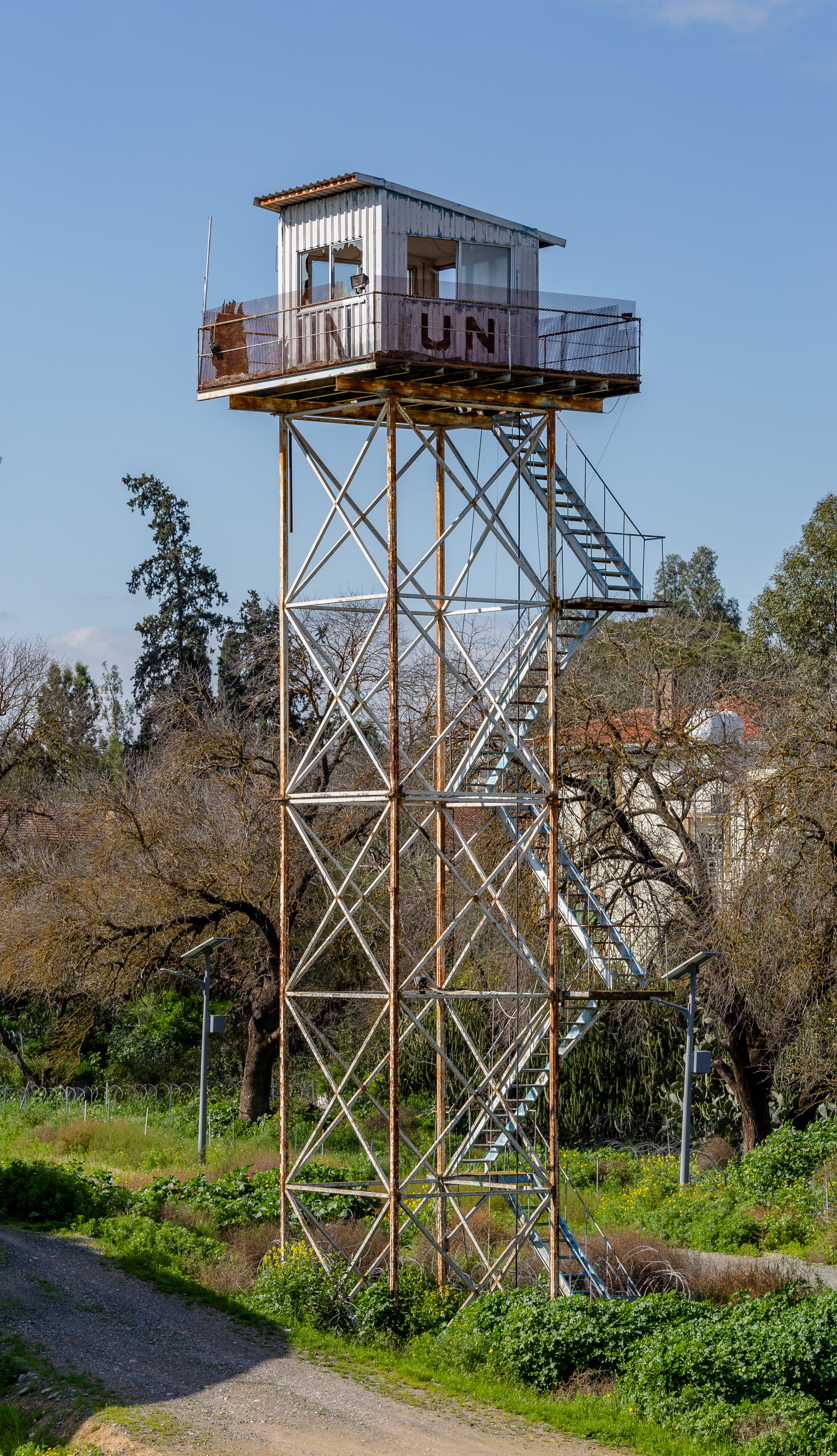
UN tower in the buffer zone

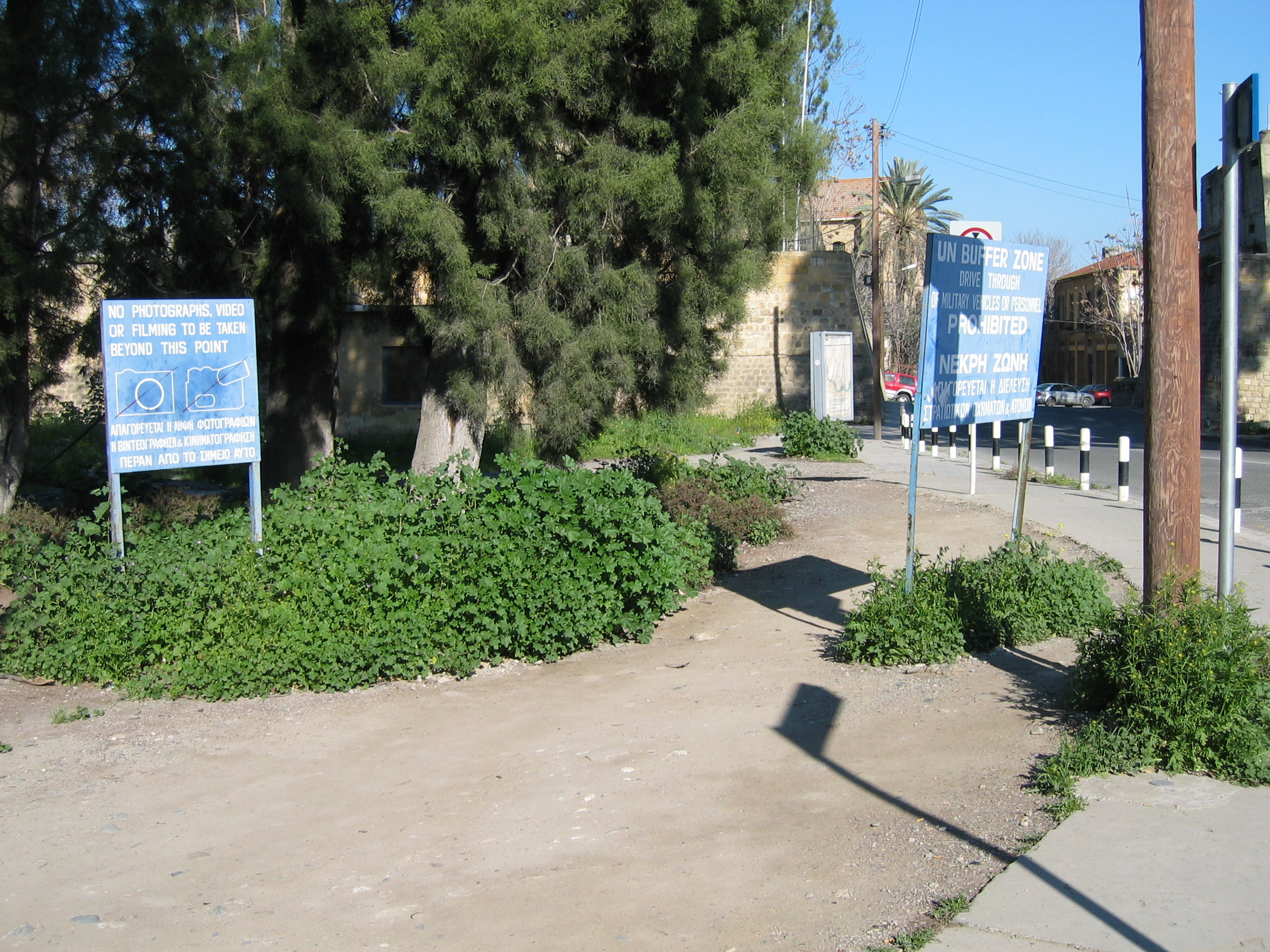
Buffer zone in Nicosia

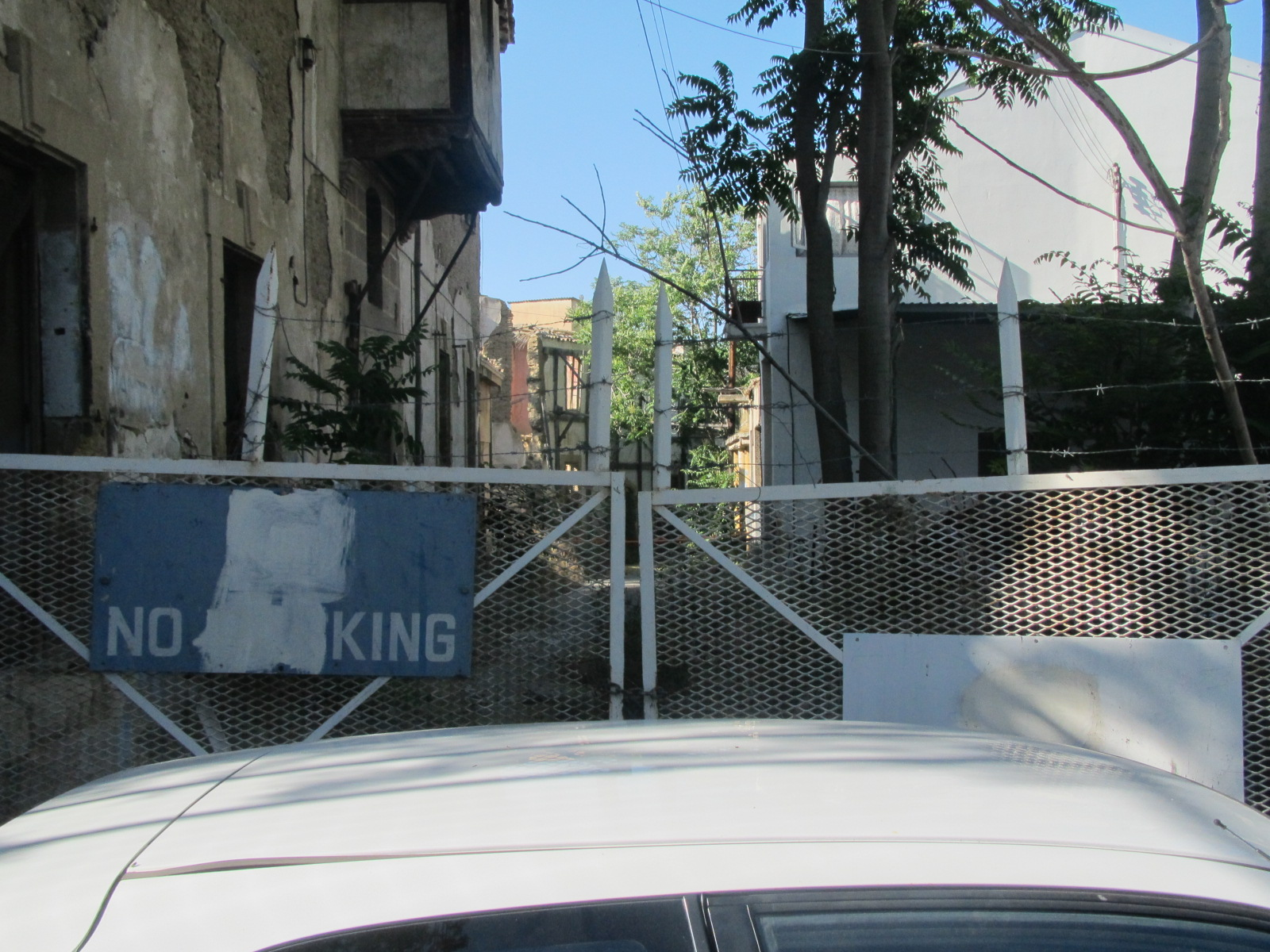
Parking gate in the buffer zone

A buffer zone in Cyprus was first established in the last days of 1963, when Major-General Peter Young was the commander of the British Joint Force (later known as the Truce Force and a predecessor of the present UN force). This Force was set up in the wake of the intercommunal violence of Christmas 1963. On 30 December 1963, following a 'high powered' twelve hour meeting chaired by Duncan Sandys (British Secretary of State for Commonwealth Relations), General Young drew the agreed cease-fire line on a map with a green chinagraph pencil, which was to become known as the "Green Line". Brigadier Patrick Thursby also assisted in devising and establishing the Green Line.

This map was then passed to General Young's intelligence officer, who was waiting in a nearby building and told to "Get on with it". Intelligence Corps NCOs then copied the map for distribution to the Truce Force units. Further copies of the map would then have been produced 'in house' for use by Truce Force patrols.

The Green Line became impassable following the July 1974 Turkish invasion of Cyprus during which Turkey occupied approximately 37% of Cypriot territory, in response to a short-lived Greek Cypriot coup. A "security zone" was established after the Tripartite Conference of Geneva in July 1974. Pursuant to United Nations Security Council Resolution 353 of 1974, the foreign ministers of Greece, Turkey, and the United Kingdom convened in Geneva on 25 July 1974. According to UNFICYP, the text of the joint declaration transmitted to the Secretary-General of the United Nations was as follows:

A security zone of a size to be determined by representatives of Greece, Turkey, and the United Kingdom, in consultation with UNFICYP, was to be established at the limit of the areas occupied by the Turkish armed forces. This zone was to be entered by no forces other than those of UNFICYP, which was to supervise the prohibition of entry. Pending the determination of the size and character of the security zone, the existing area between the two forces was not to be breached by any forces.

— Tripartite Conference & Geneva Declaration,

The UN Security Council then adopted the above declaration with Resolution 355. When the coup dissolved, the Turkish Armed Forces advanced to capture approximately 37% of the island and met the "Green Line". The meandering Buffer Zone marks the southernmost points that the Turkish troops occupied during the Turkish Invasion of Cyprus in August 1974, running between the ceasefire lines of the Cypriot National Guard and Turkish army that de facto divides Cyprus into two, cutting through the capital of Nicosia. With the self-proclamation of the internationally unrecognized "Turkish Republic of Northern Cyprus", the Buffer Zone became its de facto southern border.

Traffic across the buffer zone was very limited until 2003, when the number of crossings and the rules governing them were relaxed.

In March 2021 Cyprus erected a barbed wire fence on the Buffer Zone to curb illegal immigration.

== Sectors ==
=== Sector One ===
Starts at Kokkina exclave and covers approximately 90 kilometres (55 mi) to Mammari, west of Nicosia. Since 16 October 1993, it has been the responsibility of the Argentinian Contingent with approximately 212 soldiers. Sector One Headquarters and Command Company are located in San Martin Camp, which is near Skouriotissa village. Support Company finds its home at Roca Camp, near Xeros in the north. The two line companies are deployed along four permanently staffed patrol bases while also conducting mobile patrols from the San Martin and Roca camps.

=== Sector Two ===
Starts at Mammari, west of Nicosia and covers 30 kilometres (20 mi) to Kaimakli, east of Nicosia. Since 1993, it has been the responsibility of the British contingent, which deploys using the name Operation TOSCA.

=== Sector Three ===
Sector 3 was patrolled by Canadian troops until their departure in 1993. It was then absorbed into Sectors 2 and 4.

=== Sector Four ===
Starting at Kaimakli, east of Nicosia and covers 65 kilometres (40 mi) to the village of Dherinia, on the east coast of Cyprus and has been the responsibility of the Slovak contingent, with 202 soldiers.

== Populated places ==
There are four villages within the buffer zone:

Name	Population (2021)
Athienou	9,721
Deneia	373
Pyla	2,771
Troulloi	1,175

== Crossings ==
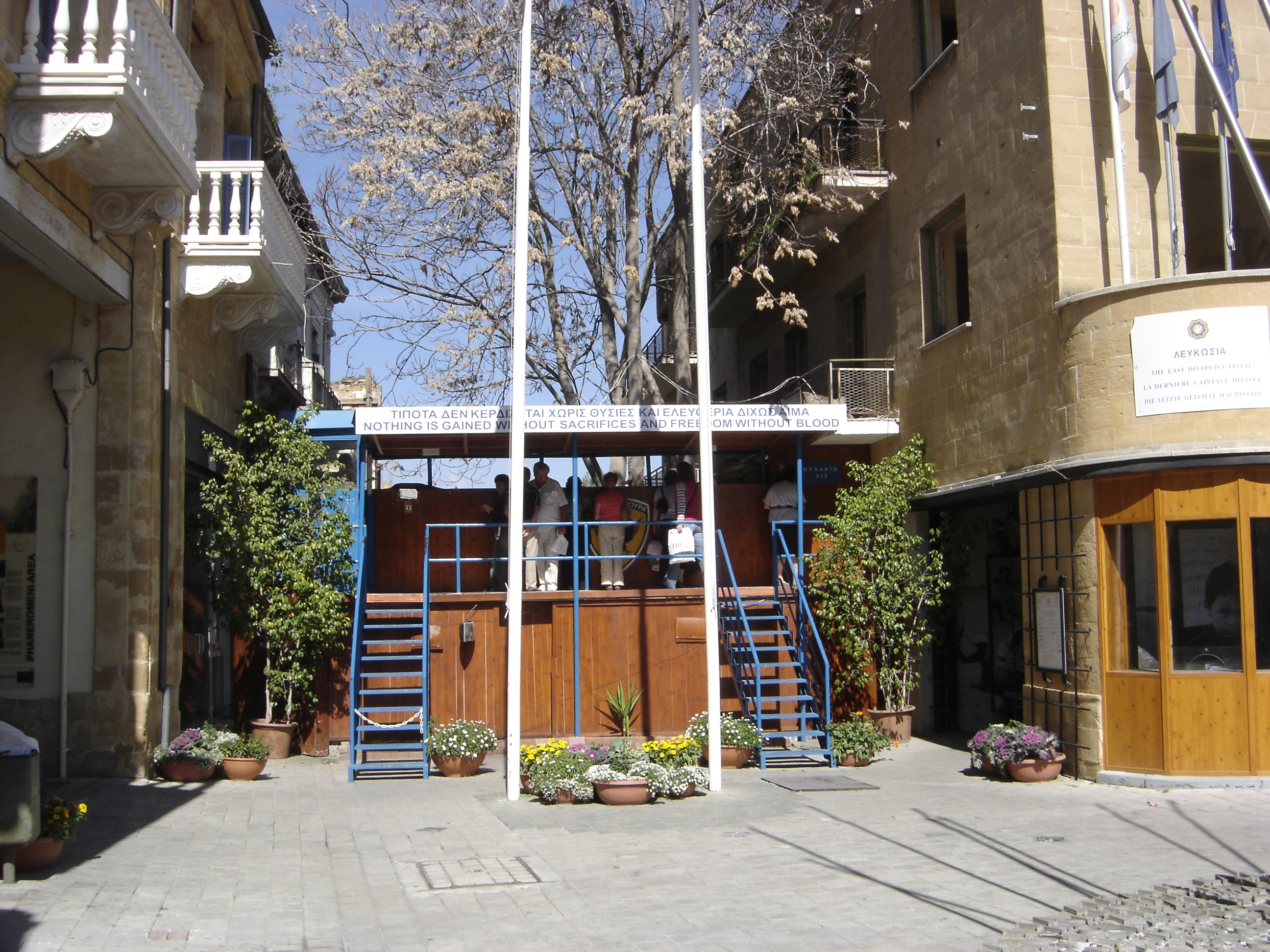
Ledra Street, once cut by the Green Line in Nicosia

After a nearly 30-year ban on crossings, the Turkish Cypriot administration significantly eased travel restrictions across the dividing line in April 2003, allowing Greek Cypriots to cross at the Ledra Palace Crossing just outside the walls of old Nicosia. This was only made possible after the decision of the ECHR (Djavit An vs Turkey, Application No.20652/92).

These are the crossings now available (west to east):

Cyprus area under the control of the Republic of Cyprus	Cyprus area under the control of Northern Cyprus	Notes
Limnitis (Λιμνίτης, Yeşilırmak)	Limnitis (Λιμνίτης, Yeşilırmak)	
Aplic (Οδόφραγμα Λεύκας, Aplic)	Lefka (Λεύκα, Lefke)	
Astromeritis (Αστρομερίτης)	Zodeia (Ζώδεια, Bostancı)	No pedestrians
Ayios Dhometios (Άγιος Δομέτιος)	Metehan	
Ledra Palace	Ledra Palace	No motor vehicles
Ledra Street (οδός Λήδρας, Lokmacı Caddesi)	Ledra Street (οδός Λήδρας, Lokmacı Caddesi)	No motor vehicles
Pyla (Πύλα, Pile)	Pergamos (Πέργαμoς, Beyarmudu)	
Agios Nikolaos (Άγιος Νικόλαος)	Strovilia (Akyar)	Crossing point controls carried out by SBA police on the one side, and by the police of the de facto Turkish Republic of Northern Cyprus on the other side
Deryneia (Δερύνεια, Derinya)	Famagusta (Αμμόχωστος, Gazimağusa)	

Before Cypriot accession to the European Union, there were restrictions on Green Line crossings by foreigners imposed by the Republic of Cyprus, but these were abolished for EU citizens by EU regulation 866/2004. Generally, citizens of any country are permitted to cross the line, including Greek and Turkish Cypriots. A 2005 EU report stated that "a systematic illegal route through the northern part to the government-controlled areas exists" allowing an influx of asylum seekers.

== Incidents ==
On 11 August 1996, Greek Cypriots demonstrated with a march against the Turkish occupation of Cyprus. The demonstrators' demand was the complete withdrawal of Turkish troops and the return of Cypriot refugees to their homes and properties. Among the demonstrators was Cypriot refugee Tassos Isaac, who was beaten to death by the Turkish far-right group Grey Wolves.

Another man, Solomos Solomou (Tassos Isaac's cousin), was shot to death by a Northern Cyprus minister during the same protests on 14 August 1996. Aged 26, Solomou was one of many mourners who entered the Buffer Zone three days after Isaac's funeral, on 14 August, to lay a wreath on the spot where he had been beaten to death. As Solomou was climbing to a flagpole to remove the flag of Turkey, he was fired upon by Minister of Agriculture and Natural Resources of Northern Cyprus Kenan Akin. An investigation by authorities of the Republic of Cyprus followed, and the suspects were named as Kenan Akin and Erdal Haciali Emanet (Turkish-born Chief of Special Forces of Northern Cyprus). International legal proceedings were instigated, and arrest warrants for both were issued via Interpol. During the demonstrations on 14 August 1996, two British soldiers were also shot at and wounded by the Turkish forces: Neil Emery and Jeffrey Hudson, both from 39th Regiment Royal Artillery. Bombardier Emery was shot in his arm, whilst Gunner Hudson was shot in the leg by a high velocity rifle round and was airlifted to hospital in Nicosia, then on to RAF Akrotiri.

In August 2023, de facto Turkish security forces (police and military) attacked members of the UN peacekeeping force inside the UN buffer zone at the Pyla. The clashes started over unauthorised construction work in an area under UN control. Turkish bulldozers removed UN trucks, cement bollards and barbed wire from the zone. The incident occurred at the Sector 4 and three peacekeepers were seriously injured and required hospitalisation. Turkish president Recep Tayyip Erdoğan accused the UN force of bias against Turkish Cypriots and added that Turkey will not allow any "unlawful" behaviour toward Turks on Cyprus. The UN Security Council said that the incident was a violation of the status quo that is contrary to council resolutions and condemned the assault on the peacekeepers. The UN Secretary-General António Guterres said that "threats to the safety of U.N. peacekeepers and damage to U.N. property are unacceptable and may constitute serious crimes under international law".

=== Activism ===
The buffer zone between the checkpoints that divide Ledra Street was used as a space for activism from 15 October 2011 up until June 2012 by the Occupy Buffer Zone movement influenced by the wider Occupy protests around the world.

== See also ==
- Cyprus problem
- Cypriot refugees
- United Nations High Commissioner for Refugees Representation in Cyprus
- List of territories governed by the United Nations
- Sovereign Base Areas Customs and Immigration
- Pyla
- Louroujina
- Kokkina
