= List of Cypriot football transfers summer 2012 =

This is a list of Cypriot football transfers for the 2012–13 summer transfer window by club. Only transfers of clubs in the Cypriot First Division and Cypriot Second Division are included.

The summer transfer window opened on 1 June 2012, although a few transfers took place prior to that date. The window closed at midnight on 31 August 2012. Players without a club may join one at any time, either during or in between transfer windows.

== Laiki Bank League ==
=== AEK Larnaca ===
In: Note: Flags indicate national team as defined under FIFA eligibility rules; some limited exceptions apply. Players may hold more than one non-FIFA nationality.

No.	Pos.	Nation	Player
17	MF	CAN	Issey Nakajima-Farran (from (Australia) Brisbane Roar)
8	MF	NED	Tom Daemen (from (Netherlands) MVV)
10	FW	SLE	Mustapha Bangura (from Apollon Limassol)
2	DF	CYP	Eleftherios Mertakas (from Enosis Neon Paralimni)
24	MF	CYP	Demetris Kyriakou (from Anagennisi Dherynia)
14	GK	MNE	Novica Gačević (free agent)
16	FW	NED	Nassir Maachi (from (Netherlands) PEC Zwolle)
21	MF	ESP	Igor Gabilondo (from (Spain) Athletic Bilbao)
28	FW	CRO	Ivan Antolek (from (Croatia) NK Varaždin)
12	DF	FRA	Kenny Gillet (from (Scotland) Inverness CT)
6	DF	ESP	David Catala (from (Spain) Celta Vigo)
55	GK	ISR	Guy Haimov (on loan from (Israel) Maccabi Tel Aviv)
14	MF	CYP	Christos Marangos (from Anorthosis Famagusta)
1	GK	ESP	Pulpo Romero (on loan from Doxa Katokopias)

Out: Note: Flags indicate national team as defined under FIFA eligibility rules; some limited exceptions apply. Players may hold more than one non-FIFA nationality.

No.	Pos.	Nation	Player
28	MF	ESP	Luis Morán (loan return to (Spain) Sporting de Gijón)
4	DF	NED	Kevin Hofland (retired)
6	DF	MLT	Luke Dimech (to (Malta) Mosta)
14	GK	ITA	Marco Fortin (retired)
33	DF	CYP	Michalis Prodromou (to Akritas Chloraka)
22	MF	CYP	Artemis Savva (to ASIL Lysi)
16	MF	NGA	Yakubu Alfa (released)
10	MF	ESP	Gonzalo García (to (Israel) Maccabi Tel Aviv)
12	FW	CYP	Lenos Georgiou (to Digenis Oroklinis)
30	GK	CYP	Andreas Photiou (to Aris Limassol)
14	GK	MNE	Novica Gačević (released)
8	MF	GRE	Giannis Skopelitis (to Anorthosis Famagusta)
1	GK	BRA	Alexandre Negri (on loan to Doxa Katokopias)

=== AEL Limassol ===
In: Note: Flags indicate national team as defined under FIFA eligibility rules; some limited exceptions apply. Players may hold more than one non-FIFA nationality.

No.	Pos.	Nation	Player
—	MF	CYP	Martinos Christofi (loan return from Enosis Neon Parekklisia)
21	DF	ANG	Marco Airosa (on loan from (Portugal) C.D. Nacional)
3	MF	BRA	Maykon (from (Portugal) U.D. Leiria)
17	FW	POR	Paulo Sérgio (from (Portugal) Vitória Guimarães)
15	DF	CYP	Christos Theophilou (from Apollon Limassol)
10	MF	POR	Rui Miguel (from (Romania) Astra Ploiești)
8	FW	GHA	Ebo Andoh (from (Portugal) F.C. Porto U19)
19	FW	CYP	Michalis Constantinou (from Anorthosis Famagusta)
9	FW	POR	Orlando Sá (from (England) Fulham)

Out: Note: Flags indicate national team as defined under FIFA eligibility rules; some limited exceptions apply. Players may hold more than one non-FIFA nationality.

No.	Pos.	Nation	Player
10	MF	POR	Silas (to AEP Paphos)
19	FW	POR	Henrique (to Olympiakos Nicosia)
44	DF	POR	Hugo Sousa (to AEP Paphos)
25	MF	POR	Kaby (to (Serbia) Red Star Belgrade)
4	DF	CYP	Pantelis Pitsillos (to Enosis Neon Parekklisia)
8	MF	CYP	Angelos Perikleous (to Ethnikos Achna)
—	MF	CYP	Martinos Christofi (on loan to AEK Kouklia)
16	DF	CPV	Nilson Antonio (to (Bulgaria) CSKA Sofia)
17	FW	CPV	Cafú (to Alki Larnaca)

=== AEP Paphos ===
In: Note: Flags indicate national team as defined under FIFA eligibility rules; some limited exceptions apply. Players may hold more than one non-FIFA nationality.

No.	Pos.	Nation	Player
31	MF	BIH	Vladan Grujic (from Aris Limassol)
10	MF	POR	Silas (from AEL Limassol)
50	FW	BRA	Serjão (from Ethnikos Achna)
22	MF	GRE	Pashalis Melissas (from (Greece) Levadiakos)
6	DF	GRE	Dimitrios Ioannou (from (Greece) Levadiakos)
84	MF	CYP	Lambros Fylaktou (from APOP Kinyras)
—	FW	GRE	Giannis Nyktaris (from (Greece) Ethnikos Asteras)
9	MF	GRE	Dimitrios Kiliaras (from (Greece) Levadiakos)
44	FW	GRE	Stathis Karamalikis (from (Greece) Panetolikos)
33	GK	ESP	Manolo Reina (from (Spain) FC Cartagena)
29	DF	GRE	Dimitris Petkakis (from (Greece) Panionios)
12	FW	BRA	Saulo (from (Portugal) Académica de Coimbra)
27	FW	BRA	Andrezinho (from (Australia) Perth Glory)
30	MF	ISR	Messay Dego (from (Israel) Maccabi Herzliya)
11	FW	ANG	Aguinaldo (on loan from (Angola) C.R.D. Libolo)
44	DF	POR	Hugo Sousa (from AEL Limassol)
17	MF	POR	Cris (from (Portugal) C.D. Feirense)
23	MF	BRA	Balú (from (Greece) Panthrakikos)

Out: Note: Flags indicate national team as defined under FIFA eligibility rules; some limited exceptions apply. Players may hold more than one non-FIFA nationality.

No.	Pos.	Nation	Player
9	FW	BUL	Dormushali Saidhodzha (to (Turkey) Kasımpaşa S.K.)
18	MF	CYP	Giorgos Sielis (to Anorthosis Famagusta)
33	MF	CYP	Giorgos Georgiou (retired)
3	DF	SEN	Momo Coly (released)
11	DF	CYP	Giannis Sampson (released)
15	MF	CYP	Onisiforos Pachtalias (to Akritas Chloraka)
99	FW	CYP	Charalambos Pittakas (to Aris Limassol)
44	FW	GRE	Stathis Karamalikis (to (Greece) Apollon Smyrnis)
17	GK	CYP	Nikolas Asprogenous (to Ethnikos Assia)
4	DF	CYP	Alexandros Demetriou (to Aris Limassol)
55	MF	POR	Miguel Vargas (released)
30	MF	ISR	Messay Dego (released)
—	FW	GRE	Giannis Nyktaris (released)
20	MF	CYP	Liasos Louka (to AEK Kouklia)

=== Alki Larnaca ===
In: Note: Flags indicate national team as defined under FIFA eligibility rules; some limited exceptions apply. Players may hold more than one non-FIFA nationality.

No.	Pos.	Nation	Player
24	MF	CYP	Giorgos Panagi (loan return from Anagennisi Dherynia)
—	MF	TOG	Guillaume Brenner (free agent)
83	GK	ENG	Corrin Brooks-Meade (loan return from Ermis Aradippou)
70	FW	BRA	Pedrinho (from (Portugal) U.D. Oliveirense)
—	MF	ARG	Leonardo Morales (from (Argentina) Atlético de Rafaela)
19	MF	ESP	Mario Martínez (from (Spain) Real Unión)
7	MF	NED	Youssouf Hersi (free agent)
4	DF	ENG	Wayne Thomas (from (Greece) Atromitos)
55	DF	ISR	Nisso Kapiloto (from (Israel) Maccabi Tel Aviv)
40	MF	ANG	Stélvio (from (Angola) C.R. Caála)
17	FW	CPV	Cafú (from AEL Limassol)
15	MF	CYP	Gerasimos Fylaktou (from Digenis Morphou)
33	GK	CYP	Antonis Georgallides (from Omonia)
26	MF	ZIM	Noel Kaseke (from Omonia)
7	DF	BRA	James Dens (from (Croatia) HNK Hajduk Split)
6	DF	ITA	Bruno Cirillo (from (Greece) PAOK)
21	MF	ESP	Cristian Hidalgo (from (Spain) Elche CF)

Out: Note: Flags indicate national team as defined under FIFA eligibility rules; some limited exceptions apply. Players may hold more than one non-FIFA nationality.

No.	Pos.	Nation	Player
18	MF	CYP	Siniša Dobrašinović (to (Kazakhstan) FC Zhetysu)
7	FW	BUL	Kostadin Bashov (to (Bulgaria) Litex Lovech)
30	MF	CYP	Simos Krassas (to Aris Limassol)
21	DF	CYP	Paraskevas Christou (to (Romania) Universitatea Cluj)
88	GK	SRB	Nenad Rajić (released)
24	MF	CYP	Giorgos Panagi (to Ermis Aradippou)
—	MF	TOG	Guillaume Brenner (released)
—	MF	ARG	Leonardo Morales (released)
2	MF	CYP	Antonis Katsis (on loan to Ayia Napa)
15	FW	ROU	Ciprian Tănasă (to (Moldova) Sheriff Tiraspol)
70	FW	BRA	Pedrinho (released)
19	MF	ESP	Mario Martínez (to Olympiakos Nicosia)
7	MF	NED	Youssouf Hersi (to (Australia) Sydney Wanderers)
4	DF	ENG	Wayne Thomas (to (Greece) Veria)
1	GK	POL	Paweł Kapsa (to Olympiakos Nicosia)

=== Anorthosis ===
In: Note: Flags indicate national team as defined under FIFA eligibility rules; some limited exceptions apply. Players may hold more than one non-FIFA nationality.

No.	Pos.	Nation	Player
15	FW	CYP	Constantinos Mintikkis (loan return from Ethnikos Assia)
36	FW	CYP	Marcos Michael (loan return from Enosis Neon Parekklisia)
37	MF	CYP	Adamos Hadjigeorgiou (loan return from Anagennisi Dherynia)
41	FW	CYP	Christoforos Christofi (loan return from Ethnikos Assia)
12	GK	CYP	Christos Mastrou (from Anagennisi Dherynia)
3	DF	POR	Paulo Jorge (from APOEL)
17	FW	CZE	Jan Rezek (from (Czech Republic) Viktoria Plzeň)
40	DF	CYP	Demetris Economou (from Enosis Neon Paralimni)
1	GK	MNE	Srđan Blažić (from (Greece) Panetolikos)
7	FW	ESP	Toni Calvo (from (Bulgaria) Levski Sofia)
88	DF	BRA	William Boaventura (from APOEL)
18	MF	CYP	Giorgos Sielis (from AEP Paphos)
8	MF	BRA	Juliano Spadacio (from (Romania) Astra Ploiești)
33	DF	SVN	Branko Ilič (free agent)
99	MF	ISR	Moshe Ohayon (from (Switzerland) FC Luzern)
27	FW	ROU	Emil Jula (on loan from (Germany) MSV Duisburg)
16	GK	FRA	Mathieu Valverde (from (France) Olympique Lyonnais)
22	DF	POR	Pedro Almeida (from (Portugal) U.D. Leiria)
19	MF	GRE	Giannis Skopelitis (from AEK Larnaca)
10	FW	ISR	Barak Yitzhaki (on loan from Maccabi Tel Aviv)

Out: Note: Flags indicate national team as defined under FIFA eligibility rules; some limited exceptions apply. Players may hold more than one non-FIFA nationality.

No.	Pos.	Nation	Player
54	MF	GRE	Giorgos Makris (loan return to (Greece) Atromitos)
31	GK	POL	Adam Stachowiak (loan return to (Poland) Górnik Zabrze)
1	GK	SVK	Matúš Kozáčik (to (Czech Republic) Viktoria Plzeň)
22	DF	CPV	Janicio Martins (released)
4	MF	BUL	Stanislav Angelov (to (Bulgaria) Levski Sofia)
19	FW	CYP	Michalis Constantinou (to AEL Limassol)
8	MF	MAR	Jaouad Zairi (released)
7	DF	GEO	Davit Kvirkvelia (to (Georgia (country)) Dila Gori)
15	FW	CYP	Constantinos Mintikkis (to Omonia Aradippou)
41	FW	CYP	Christoforos Christofi (to Ethnikos Achnas)
3	DF	BUL	Igor Tomašić (released)
37	MF	CYP	Adamos Hadjigeorgiou (on loan to Anagennisi Dherynia)
83	DF	NED	Civard Sprockel (to (Bulgaria) CSKA Sofia)
28	MF	BUL	Marquinhos (to (China) Changchun Yatai)
41	MF	CYP	Zacharias Theodorou (on loan to Ayia Napa)
6	MF	CYP	Christos Marangos (to AEK Larnaca)
36	FW	CYP	Marcos Michael (on loan to Olympiakos Nicosia)

=== APOEL ===
In: Note: Flags indicate national team as defined under FIFA eligibility rules; some limited exceptions apply. Players may hold more than one non-FIFA nationality.

No.	Pos.	Nation	Player
—	DF	CYP	Andreas Charalambous (loan return from Ethnikos Assia)
—	MF	CYP	Marios Theodorou (loan return from Ethnikos Assia)
—	FW	CYP	Achilleas Vasiliou (loan return from Doxa Katokopias)
28	DF	POR	Mário Sérgio (from (Ukraine) Metalurh Donetsk)
30	DF	ANG	Francisco Zuela (from (Russia) FC Kuban)
46	FW	CYP	Efstathios Aloneftis (from Omonia)
27	DF	ESP	Aritz Borda (from (Spain) Recreativo Huelva)
18	MF	TUN	Selim Benachour (from (Portugal) C.S. Marítimo)
7	FW	CRO	Mario Budimir (from (Greece) Ergotelis)
5	DF	CAN	Michael Klukowski (from (Turkey) Manisaspor)
55	DF	GRE	Christos Karipidis (from Omonia)
20	MF	GRE	Alexandros Tziolis (on loan from (France) AS Monaco)

Out: Note: Flags indicate national team as defined under FIFA eligibility rules; some limited exceptions apply. Players may hold more than one non-FIFA nationality.

No.	Pos.	Nation	Player
—	MF	CYP	Marios Theodorou (to PAEEK FC)
3	DF	POR	Paulo Jorge (to Anorthosis Famagusta)
4	DF	BRA	Kaká (loan return to (Germany) Hertha BSC)
98	DF	BRA	William Boaventura (to Anorthosis Famagusta)
81	MF	BRA	Marcinho (to (Bulgaria) Levski Sofia)
7	DF	GRE	Savvas Poursaitides (retired)
11	FW	MKD	Ivan Tričkovski (to (Belgium) Club Brugge)
12	MF	CYP	Emilios Panayiotou (on loan to Olympiakos Nicosia)
8	FW	BRA	Aílton (to (Russia) Terek Grozny)

=== Apollon Limassol ===
In: Note: Flags indicate national team as defined under FIFA eligibility rules; some limited exceptions apply. Players may hold more than one non-FIFA nationality.

No.	Pos.	Nation	Player
—	MF	CYP	Marios Charalambous (loan return from Ermis Aradippou)
22	DF	CYP	Giannis Demetriou (loan return from Enosis Neon Parekklisia)
96	MF	CYP	Stelios Demetriou (loan return from Ermis Aradippou)
5	DF	MKD	Bojan Markovski (from Enosis Neon Paralimni)
22	DF	BRA	Paulinho (from Olympiakos Nicosia)
27	DF	CYP	Angelis Charalambous (from Ermis Aradippou)
11	FW	CYP	Alex Konstantinou (free agent)
19	MF	ARG	Sebastián Setti (from (Ukraine) Chornomorets Odesa)
13	MF	ARG	Emmanuel Serra (from River Plate Ecuador)
88	MF	CYP	Giorgos Vasiliou (from Aris Limassol)
18	MF	CRO	Ivan Parlov (from (Austria) SV Mattersburg)
83	GK	POR	Bruno Vale (from (Portugal) U.D. Oliveirense)
81	DF	POR	Miguelito (from (Portugal) Vitória Setúbal)
9	FW	GRE	Dimitris Souanis (from (Greece) Skoda Xanthi)
26	FW	GRE	Fotios Papoulis (from (Greece) OFI)
97	MF	CYP	Andreas Frangou (from Anagennisi Germasogias)
10	MF	GRE	Giorgos Theodoridis (from (Greece) Panetolikos)
29	FW	ESP	Roberto García (from (Spain) SD Huesca)
30	FW	CPV	Dady (from (Portugal) S.C. Olhanense)
14	DF	ESP	Iván Amaya (from (Spain) Real Murcia)

Out: Note: Flags indicate national team as defined under FIFA eligibility rules; some limited exceptions apply. Players may hold more than one non-FIFA nationality.

No.	Pos.	Nation	Player
37	DF	BRA	Thiago Sales (loan return to (Brazil) Avaí)
12	FW	PER	Gianfranco Labarthe (loan return to (Peru) Universidad San Martín)
11	FW	POR	João Paulo (to (Portugal) Estoril Praia)
14	DF	MAR	Chakib Benzoukane (released)
80	MF	CZE	Miroslav Matušovič (released)
38	DF	CZE	Martin Kolář (released)
17	GK	CZE	Aleš Chvalovský (released)
79	MF	FRA	Stéphane Noro (to (France) RC Strasbourg)
74	MF	SEN	Ousmane Cissokho (to (France) FC Rouen)
24	MF	POR	Zé Vítor (to (Greece) Veria)
22	DF	CYP	Giannis Demetriou (to Enosis Neon Parekklisia)
4	MF	NGA	Waheed Oseni (to Ethnikos Achna)
9	FW	MKD	Hristijan Kirovski (to (Israel) Ironi Nir Ramat HaSharon)
15	DF	FRA	Samuel Néva (released)
10	FW	SLE	Mustapha Bangura (to AEK Larnaca)
96	DF	CYP	Stelios Demetriou (to Ermis Aradippou)
21	DF	CYP	Christos Theophilou (to AEL Limassol)
—	FW	CYP	Michalis Sykas (to Nikos & Sokratis Erimi)
—	MF	CYP	Stavrinos Stylianou (to Nikos & Sokratis Erimi)

=== Ayia Napa ===
In: Note: Flags indicate national team as defined under FIFA eligibility rules; some limited exceptions apply. Players may hold more than one non-FIFA nationality.

No.	Pos.	Nation	Player
23	DF	POR	Ginho (from APOP Kinyras)
10	MF	POR	Ricardo Catchana (from APOP Kinyras)
11	FW	POR	Manuel Riera (free agent)
12	FW	BRA	Jackson Souza (from (Portugal) U.D. Tocha)
26	MF	POR	Marquinhos (from (Portugal) Amarante)
7	MF	BIH	Branislav Nikić (free agent)
19	FW	CYP	Georgios Kolokoudias (from Anagennisi Dherynia)
16	MF	POR	Hugo Soares (from Anagennisi Dherynia)
4	DF	POR	Fabeta (from (Portugal) Gondomar S.C.)
31	GK	CYP	Athos Chrysostomou (from Ethnikos Achna)
8	DF	GRE	Nikos Barboudis (from ENAD Polis Chrysochous)
32	MF	CYP	Antonis Katsis (on loan from Alki Larnaca)
21	DF	POR	Fausto Lúcio (from (Portugal) Louletano D.C.)
2	DF	ISR	Uri Peso (from (Israel) Hapoel Jerusalem)
24	MF	CYP	Zacharias Theodorou (on loan from Anorthosis Famagusta)
15	MF	BRA	Robson (from (Australia) Gold Coast United)
9	MF	SRB	Predrag Lazić (from Aris Limassol)
28	FW	POR	Vítor Afonso (from (Portugal) Oriental)
6	MF	BRA	Paulo Sérgio (from (Malaysia) PKNS FC)

Out: Note: Flags indicate national team as defined under FIFA eligibility rules; some limited exceptions apply. Players may hold more than one non-FIFA nationality.

No.	Pos.	Nation	Player
4	DF	CYP	Costas Loizou (retired)
8	MF	CYP	Spyros Machattos (to Achyronas Liopetriou)
17	MF	CYP	Christos Pierettis (to Onisilos Sotira)
6	DF	CYP	Panayiotis Kosma (to Onisilos Sotira)
16	FW	CYP	Costas Georgiou (to Onisilos Sotira)
19	MF	CYP	Manolis Manoli (to Anagennisi Dherynia)
11	MF	HUN	Lajos Terjék (to Ermis Aradippou)
33	DF	CYP	Panayiotis Dionysiou (to Othellos Athienou)
7	MF	POR	Ludgero da Silveira (to Omonia Aradippou)
31	MF	POR	Jorge Tavares (released)
10	MF	CYP	Nicolas Manoli (to Othellos Athienou)
13	DF	CYP	Petros Chatziaros (to Digenis Oroklinis)
15	DF	CYP	Antonis Moushis (to Onisilos Sotira)

=== Doxa Katokopias ===
In: Note: Flags indicate national team as defined under FIFA eligibility rules; some limited exceptions apply. Players may hold more than one non-FIFA nationality.

No.	Pos.	Nation	Player
62	GK	GRE	Christos Athanasopoulos (from (Greece) Aiolikos)
1	GK	BRA	Felipe Gomes (from (Brazil) Moto Club)
8	MF	POR	Castanheira (from (Portugal) G.D. Chaves)
—	DF	GNB	Valter Fernandes (from (Portugal) C.D. Pinhalnovense)
26	MF	CIV	Gaossou Fofana (from (Portugal) Sporting Covilhã)
25	DF	BRA	João Leonardo (from (Brazil) Marcílio Dias)
34	DF	BRA	Leandro da Silva (from (Brazil) Paraná)
3	DF	ESP	Pablo Suárez (from (Spain) Pontevedra)
20	MF	ESP	Brais Lorenzo (from (Sweden) Ljungskile SK)
13	DF	POR	Carlos Marques (from Olympiakos Nicosia)
14	DF	ENG	Michael Weir (from (Portugal) C.D. Nacional)
16	FW	FRA	Amick Ciani (from (Belgium) K.A.S. Eupen)
7	MF	FRA	Francis Laurent (from (England) Lincoln City)
6	DF	GRE	Stefanos Siontis (from (Greece) Panetolikos)
10	MF	POR	Ricardo Fernandes (from (Greece) Panetolikos)
23	MF	ESP	Jorge Troiteiro (from (Spain) Burgos)
30	GK	ESP	Pulpo Romero (from (Spain) Orihuela)
9	FW	CPV	Toy (from (Portugal) Olhanense)
7	MF	POR	Carlos André (from Olympiakos Nicosia)
99	MF	CIV	Adama Bamba (free agent)
44	MF	CIV	Lamine N'Dao (free agent)
30	GK	BRA	Alexandre Negri (on loan from AEK Larnaca)

Out: Note: Flags indicate national team as defined under FIFA eligibility rules; some limited exceptions apply. Players may hold more than one non-FIFA nationality.

No.	Pos.	Nation	Player
—	DF	POR	Diogo Vila (to (Portugal) Naval)
88	FW	CYP	Achilleas Vasiliou (loan return to APOEL)
23	GK	POR	Jorge (to AEK Kouklia)
1	GK	CYP	Kyriacos Ioannou (to PAEEK FC)
17	DF	POR	Éder (to (Spain) CD San Fernando)
18	FW	POR	Milton (to Aris Limassol)
24	DF	POR	Gonçalo Costa (to (Portugal) U.D. Leiria)
45	FW	GNB	Adul Baldé (released)
11	MF	POR	Pedro Mendes (to (Bulgaria) PSFC Chernomorets Burgas)
9	FW	POR	Pedro Bonifácio (to Anagennisi Dherynia)
15	DF	CMR	William Modibo (to (Portugal) C.D. Tondela)
20	DF	FRA	Maxime Larroque (released)
8	MF	POR	Cuco (released)
7	FW	ROU	Lucian Pârvu (to (Romania) CS Otopeni)
6	MF	POR	João Pedro (released)
27	FW	SWE	Michel Adzic (to Ermis Aradippou)
62	GK	GRE	Christos Athanasopoulos (to (Greece) Paniliakos)
7	MF	FRA	Francis Laurent (released)
—	DF	GNB	Valter Fernandes (to (Portugal) Vitória Guimarães)
21	FW	POR	Hardy Pinto (to AEK Kouklia)
11	MF	SWE	Nino Osmanagić (to Akritas Chloraka)
20	MF	ESP	Brais Lorenzo (to Akritas Chloraka)
30	GK	ESP	Pulpo Romero (on loan to AEK Larnaca)

=== Enosis Neon Paralimni ===
In: Note: Flags indicate national team as defined under FIFA eligibility rules; some limited exceptions apply. Players may hold more than one non-FIFA nationality.

No.	Pos.	Nation	Player
17	MF	CYP	Demos Goumenos (from Ermis Aradippou)
42	MF	BRA	Leonardo Souza (free agent)
4	MF	CYP	Kostakis Artymatas (from (England) Nottingham Forest U21)
8	FW	CYP	Georgios Tofas (from Anagennisi Dherynia)
5	DF	BRA	Anderson (free agent)
19	DF	EQG	Rui (from (Spain) UD Logroñés)
1	GK	MLT	Andrew Hogg (from (Malta) Valletta)
3	MF	MTN	Yoann Langlet (from (Greece) Veroia)
55	DF	POR	Carlos Milhazes (from (Portugal) G.D. Chaves)
29	DF	CYP	Demetris Moulazimis (loan return from Ermis Aradippou)
7	MF	SVN	Dejan Krljanović (from (Slovenia) NK Celje)
10	MF	POR	Filipe da Costa (from (Greece) Panserraikos)
20	FW	NGA	Emmanuel Okoduwa (free agent)
24	DF	CYP	Andreas Constantinou (free agent)
2	DF	GRE	Aris Galanopoulos (from (Greece) OFI)
28	DF	ESP	Carlos Quesada (from (Spain) Atlético Baleares)
18	DF	GRE	Stavros Stathakis (on loan from (Greece) Skoda Xanthi)
23	GK	SEN	Bouna Coundoul (from (Finland) VPS)
13	MF	ARG	Aldo Duscher (from (Spain) RCD Espanyol)
14	FW	SVK	Tomáš Oravec (from (Romania) Astra Ploiești)

Out: Note: Flags indicate national team as defined under FIFA eligibility rules; some limited exceptions apply. Players may hold more than one non-FIFA nationality.

No.	Pos.	Nation	Player
18	FW	ISR	Idan Sade (loan return to (Israel) F.C. Ashdod)
5	DF	MKD	Bojan Markovski (to Apollon Limassol)
77	MF	SRB	Enver Alivodić (to (Serbia) FK Novi Pazar)
9	FW	FRA	Cédric Moukouri (to (Réunion) Saint-Pauloise)
31	GK	BUL	Georgi Petkov (to (Bulgaria) Slavia Sofia)
1	GK	MKD	Petar Miloševski (retired)
20	DF	BEL	Matthias Trenson (to (Belgium) K.V.C. Westerlo)
25	DF	CYP	Demetris Economou (to Anorthosis Famagusta)
7	MF	BEL	Kristof Imschoot (to (Belgium) Cappellen)
13	MF	CYP	Chrysis Michael (retired)
15	MF	ZAM	Justine Zulu (to (South Africa) Golden Arrows)
8	MF	SRB	Radovan Krivokapić (to (Greece) Iraklis)
27	FW	SCO	Mark Burchill (to (Thailand) Esan United)
30	DF	CYP	Eleftherios Mertakas (to AEK Larnaca)
14	DF	BEL	Jimmy De Wulf (released)
2	DF	COD	Mike Mampuya (released)
28	DF	ESP	Carlos Quesada (to (Spain) UCAM Murcia)
21	FW	CPV	José Semedo (to Nea Salamina)

=== Ethnikos Achna ===
In: Note: Flags indicate national team as defined under FIFA eligibility rules; some limited exceptions apply. Players may hold more than one non-FIFA nationality.

No.	Pos.	Nation	Player
99	FW	CMR	Emmanuel Kenmogne (from Olympiakos Nicosia)
18	MF	POR	Vítor Lima (from (Greece) Doxa Drama)
88	MF	GLP	Matthieu Bemba (from (Netherlands) FC Emmen)
1	GK	POL	Arkadiusz Malarz (from (Greece) Panachaiki)
8	MF	POR	Oliveira (from (Portugal) U.D. Oliveirense)
6	MF	CYP	Angelos Perikleous (from AEL Limassol)
11	MF	ARG	Marcelo Penta (from (Greece) Pierikos)
12	GK	MKD	Marko Jovanovski (from (North Macedonia) FK Shkëndija)
5	DF	BRA	Allyson (from (Portugal) Penafiel)
26	FW	CYP	Christoforos Christofi (from Anorthosis Famagusta)
3	DF	BRA	Marco Aurélio (from Olympiakos Nicosia)
32	DF	GRE	Nikos Arabatzis (from (Greece) AEL)
13	MF	NGA	Waheed Oseni (from Apollon Limassol)
9	FW	POR	Marco Paixão (from (Iran) Naft Tehran)
44	GK	CRO	Marko Šarlija (from Olympiakos Nicosia)

Out: Note: Flags indicate national team as defined under FIFA eligibility rules; some limited exceptions apply. Players may hold more than one non-FIFA nationality.

No.	Pos.	Nation	Player
21	MF	BRA	Eduardo Pincelli (to Nea Salamina)
75	MF	BRA	Wender (to Aris Limassol)
22	GK	CYP	Athos Chrysostomou (to Ayia Napa)
12	GK	LVA	Jevgēņijs Sazonovs (to (Latvia) FK Jelgava)
1	GK	MKD	Edin Nuredinoski (to (Azerbaijan) FC Baku)
8	MF	GER	Lars Schlichting (released)
5	DF	MNE	Nikola Vukčević (to (Montenegro) Budućnost Podgorica)
19	MF	SRB	Saša Stojanović (to (Serbia) Radnički Niš)
9	FW	CRO	Ivan Babić (released)
3	DF	SRB	Ivica Milutinović (to (Serbia) BSK Borča)
33	MF	CYP	Petros Filaniotis (to Omonia Aradippou)
50	FW	BRA	Serjão (to AEP Paphos)
23	MF	MKD	Stojan Ignatov (to (North Macedonia) FK Metalurg)
32	DF	CYP	Constantinos Samaras (to Ermis Aradippou)

=== Nea Salamina ===
In: Note: Flags indicate national team as defined under FIFA eligibility rules; some limited exceptions apply. Players may hold more than one non-FIFA nationality.

No.	Pos.	Nation	Player
29	GK	HUN	Zoltán Kovács (from Aris Limassol)
33	DF	CYP	Nikos Englezou (on loan from (Greece) AEK Athens)
2	MF	BRA	Eduardo Pincelli (from Ethnikos Achna)
1	GK	POL	Maciej Czyzniewski (from (Poland) Nielba Wągrowiec)
26	DF	HUN	Károly Graszl (from (Hungary) Kaposvár)
25	FW	CPV	Pedro Moreira (from (Portugal) Estoril Praia)
4	DF	BRA	Rodrigo Ribeiro (from (Brazil) A.D.Cabofriense)
9	FW	CPV	José Semedo (from Enosis Neon Paralimni)

Out: Note: Flags indicate national team as defined under FIFA eligibility rules; some limited exceptions apply. Players may hold more than one non-FIFA nationality.

No.	Pos.	Nation	Player
1	GK	SVN	Dejan Milič (released)
42	GK	ESP	Ángel Pindado (to (Spain) Real Ávila)
2	DF	CYP	Nicos Photiou (to Anagennisi Dherynia)
14	MF	ESP	Diego León (to (Greece) Kerkyra)
6	MF	EST	Martin Vunk (to (Greece) Panachaiki)
20	MF	CYP	Rafael Yiangoudakis (to Nikos & Sokratis Erimi)
22	DF	URU	Carlos García (to (Uruguay) Racing Club de Montevideo)
16	DF	SRB	Nino Pekarić (released)
33	FW	GHA	Samuel Yeboah (released)

=== Olympiakos Nicosia ===
In: Note: Flags indicate national team as defined under FIFA eligibility rules; some limited exceptions apply. Players may hold more than one non-FIFA nationality.

No.	Pos.	Nation	Player
45	FW	CYP	Christoforos Xenofontos (loan return from Ethnikos Assia)
80	FW	CYP	Valantis Kapartis (loan return from Chalkanoras Idaliou)
9	FW	POR	Henrique (from AEL Limassol)
17	DF	POR	Tiago Costa (from (Portugal) Rio Ave)
23	MF	MLI	Mamadou Djikiné (from (Portugal) Vitória Setúbal)
10	FW	NED	Abdenasser El Khayati (free agent)
44	MF	CPV	Nené (from (Portugal) Arouca)
12	FW	BRA	Cesinha (from (Macau) Windsor Arch Ka I)
7	MF	NGA	Samson (from (Portugal) Sporting Covilhã)
1	GK	CRO	Marko Šarlija (from (Azerbaijan) FC Baku)
7	FW	AUS	Robert Stambolziev (from (Greece) Thrasyvoulos)
22	GK	SVN	Gregor Šmajd (from (Slovenia) NK Šenčur)
14	MF	SVN	Luka Pavlin (from (Slovenia) FC Koper)
10	MF	POR	Hélder Castro (from (Romania) Universitatea Cluj)
4	DF	RUS	Boris Rotenberg (on loan from (Russia) Dynamo Moscow)
5	DF	CGO	Lucien Aubey (from (France) Stade de Reims)
70	MF	ESP	Mario Martínez (from Alki Larnaca)
33	DF	CYP	Giorgos Pelagias (from (Italy) Barletta Calcio)
45	MF	CYP	Emilios Panayiotou (on loan from APOEL)
1	GK	POL	Paweł Kapsa (from Alki Larnaca)
18	FW	CYP	Marcos Michael (on loan from Anorthosis Famagusta)
78	MF	NGA	Sani Kaita (free agent)

Out: Note: Flags indicate national team as defined under FIFA eligibility rules; some limited exceptions apply. Players may hold more than one non-FIFA nationality.

No.	Pos.	Nation	Player
3	DF	BRA	Marco Aurélio (to Ethnikos Achna)
76	DF	POR	Carlos Marques (to Doxa Katokopias)
2	DF	BRA	Paulinho (to Apollon Limassol)
5	DF	BIH	Delimir Bajić (to (Greece) Olympiacos Volos)
18	FW	CMR	Emmanuel Kenmogne (to Ethnikos Achna)
99	FW	GER	Mustafa Kučuković (released)
39	FW	SEN	Moussa Koita (released)
25	MF	SRB	Dejan Rusmir (released)
1	GK	LTU	Ernestas Šetkus (to (Bulgaria) Botev Plovdiv)
7	MF	POR	Carlos André (to Doxa Katokopias)
44	MF	CPV	Nené (to (Portugal) Sporting Covilhã)
45	FW	CYP	Christoforos Xenofontos (to Ethnikos Assia)
80	FW	CYP	Valantis Kapartis (to Chalkanoras Idaliou)
7	MF	NGA	Samson (released)
10	FW	NED	Abdenasser El Khayati (released)
1	GK	CRO	Marko Šarlija (to Ethnikos Achna)

=== Omonia ===
In: Note: Flags indicate national team as defined under FIFA eligibility rules; some limited exceptions apply. Players may hold more than one non-FIFA nationality.

No.	Pos.	Nation	Player
1	GK	SUI	Johnny Leoni (from (Switzerland) FC Zürich)
17	DF	FRA	Anthony Scaramozzino (from (France) Châteauroux)
4	DF	MNE	Savo Pavićević (from (Israel) Maccabi Tel Aviv)
27	MF	ISR	Oz Raly (from (Israel) Bnei Yehuda)
26	GK	ISR	Ohad Levita (from (Israel) Hapoel Be'er Sheva)
60	MF	CPV	Marco Soares (from (Portugal) U.D. Leiria)
14	DF	BRA	Danielson (from (Portugal) C.D. Nacional)
8	MF	ALG	Hameur Bouazza (from (England) Millwall)
21	MF	POR	Nuno Assis (from (Portugal) Vitória Guimarães)
6	MF	POR	João Alves (from (Portugal) Vitória Guimarães)
23	DF	POR	João Paulo (from (Portugal) Vitória Guimarães)
30	MF	MLT	André Schembri (from (Greece) Panionios)

Out: Note: Flags indicate national team as defined under FIFA eligibility rules; some limited exceptions apply. Players may hold more than one non-FIFA nationality.

No.	Pos.	Nation	Player
8	MF	FRA	Bryan Bergougnoux (loan return to (Italy) U.S. Lecce)
16	MF	ZIM	Noel Kaseke (to Alki Larnaca)
17	FW	CYP	Theodosis Kyprou (on loan to Ermis Aradippou)
46	FW	CYP	Efstathios Aloneftis (to APOEL)
6	MF	SUI	Vero Salatić (to (Switzerland) Grasshopper)
13	MF	CYP	Constantinos Makrides (to (Ukraine) Metalurh Donetsk)
15	GK	CYP	Giorgos Loizou (to AEZ Zakakiou)
26	FW	CYP	Ioannis Chadjivasilis (on loan to Aris Limassol)
30	GK	CYP	Antonis Georgallides (to Alki Larnaca)
20	DF	ALG	Sofiane Cherfa (on loan to (Greece) Panthrakikos)
8	MF	ALG	Hameur Bouazza (to (Spain) Racing de Santander)
29	DF	ESP	Iago Bouzón (to (Spain) Xerez CD)
5	DF	GRE	Christos Karipidis (to APOEL)
27	MF	ISR	Oz Raly (to (Israel) Bnei Yehuda)

== Cypriot Second Division ==
=== AEK Kouklia ===
In: Note: Flags indicate national team as defined under FIFA eligibility rules; some limited exceptions apply. Players may hold more than one non-FIFA nationality.

No.	Pos.	Nation	Player
2	MF	BEL	Fangio Buyse (from Akritas Chloraka)
1	GK	POR	Jorge (from Doxa Katokopia)
17	MF	CPV	Bruno Spencer (from Ethnikos Assia)
5	DF	POR	Nuno Gomes (from Akritas Chloraka)
7	MF	POR	Ivan Forbes (from Akritas Chloraka)
3	DF	CYP	Marios Papademetriou (from Akritas Chloraka)
22	MF	CYP	Andreas Andreou (from Akritas Chloraka)
9	FW	CYP	Stamatis Pantos (from Enosis Neon Parekklisia)
93	MF	CYP	Martinos Christofi (on loan from AEL Limassol)
23	DF	CYP	Giorgos Tofaridis (from (Netherlands) VV de Bataven)
87	FW	CYP	Savvas Pikramenos (from Othellos Athienou)
21	FW	POR	Hardy Pinto (from Doxa Katokopia)
6	DF	CYP	Demos Sokratous (from Enosis Neon Parekklisia)
80	MF	CYP	Liasos Louka (from AEP Paphos)

Out: Note: Flags indicate national team as defined under FIFA eligibility rules; some limited exceptions apply. Players may hold more than one non-FIFA nationality.

No.	Pos.	Nation	Player
9	FW	NED	Dion Esajas (to Karmiotissa)
90	MF	ZIM	Shingayi Kaondera (released)
2	DF	CYP	Filippos Filippou (released)
5	DF	CYP	Vryonis Vryoni (Finikas Agias Marinas)
6	MF	CYP	Andreas Karamanis (to Karmiotissa)
8	MF	CYP	Nicolas Kissonergis (to AEZ Zakakiou)
11	MF	CYP	Antonis Antoniou (to AEZ Zakakiou)
23	DF	CYP	Filippos Filippou (to Atromitos Yeroskipou)
1	GK	CYP	Andreas Theodorou (to ENAD Polis Chrysochous)

=== AEZ Zakakiou ===
In: Note: Flags indicate national team as defined under FIFA eligibility rules; some limited exceptions apply. Players may hold more than one non-FIFA nationality.

No.	Pos.	Nation	Player
—	FW	SLE	Allie Andrew (from ASIL)
—	MF	CYP	Nicolas Kissonergis (from AEK Kouklia)
—	MF	CYP	Constantinos Kissonergis (from Nikos & Sokratis Erimi)
—	GK	CYP	Giorgos Charalambous (from Aris Limassol)
—	MF	CYP	Valentinos Pastellis (from APEP)
—	MF	CYP	Marios Pastellis (from Konstantios & Evripidis Trachoniou)
—	MF	GHA	Yaw Rush (from Karmiotissa)
—	MF	CYP	Antonis Antoniou (from AEK Kouklia)
—	GK	CYP	Giorgos Loizou (from Omonia)

Out: Note: Flags indicate national team as defined under FIFA eligibility rules; some limited exceptions apply. Players may hold more than one non-FIFA nationality.

No.	Pos.	Nation	Player
27	DF	CYP	Spyros Christoforou (released)

=== Akritas Chloraka ===
In: Note: Flags indicate national team as defined under FIFA eligibility rules; some limited exceptions apply. Players may hold more than one non-FIFA nationality.

No.	Pos.	Nation	Player
12	GK	POR	José Eduardo (from APOP Kinyras)
21	DF	CYP	Christos Palates (from APOP Kinyras)
5	DF	GRE	Theodoros Galanis (from APOP Kinyras)
8	MF	CYP	Michalis Agathangelou (from APOP Kinyras)
4	DF	CYP	Nicos Savva (from Atromitos Yeroskipou)
20	MF	CYP	Onisiforos Pachtalias (from AEP Paphos)
9	FW	POR	Felipe Barros (from (Portugal) C.D. Santa Clara)
10	FW	POR	Miguel Herlein (from (Portugal) S.L. Benfica U19)
17	FW	GNB	Ibraima Baldé (from (Portugal) Vizela)
7	MF	FRA	Samir Bensayah (from (France) Stade de Reims)
11	MF	FRA	Wesley Conil (from (France) Levallois 92)
40	MF	SWE	Nino Osmanagić (from Doxa Katokopias)
11	MF	ESP	Brais Lorenzo (from Doxa Katokopias)
17	MF	NED	Luciano Dompig (from (Belgium) Cercle Brugge)
3	DF	ISR	Nir Mantsur (from (Greece) Panathinaikos U21)

Out: Note: Flags indicate national team as defined under FIFA eligibility rules; some limited exceptions apply. Players may hold more than one non-FIFA nationality.

No.	Pos.	Nation	Player
10	FW	CYP	Marios Neophytou (to APEP)
2	MF	BEL	Fangio Buyse (to AEK Kouklia)
5	DF	POR	Nuno Gomes (to AEK Kouklia)
17	MF	POR	Ivan Forbes (to AEK Kouklia)
3	DF	CYP	Marios Papademetriou (to AEK Kouklia)
22	MF	CYP	Andreas Andreou (to AEK Kouklia)
33	DF	CYP	Giorgos Constanti (to Nicos & Socratis Erimis)
27	MF	CYP	Evgenios Kyriacou (to Karmiotissa)
11	FW	CYP	Demetris Kardanas (to Konstantios & Evripidis Trachoniou)
32	MF	CYP	Marios Adamou (to Kissos FC Kissonergas)
77	GK	CYP	Marios Savva (to Kissos FC Kissonergas)
40	FW	POR	Ângelo Henriques (to Chalkanoras Idaliou)
55	DF	CYP	Michalis Paschali (to APEP)
7	FW	FRA	Mamadou Diawara (to (Portugal) Belenenses)
8	FW	NGA	Marco Tagbajumi (to APEP)
89	FW	POR	Vivaldo (to (Portugal) Futebol Benfica)
17	FW	GNB	Ibraima Baldé (to (Portugal) Oriental)

=== Anagennisi Dherynia ===
In: Note: Flags indicate national team as defined under FIFA eligibility rules; some limited exceptions apply. Players may hold more than one non-FIFA nationality.

No.	Pos.	Nation	Player
10	FW	CYP	Christoforos Christofi (from Onisilos Sotira)
17	MF	CYP	Marios Laifis (from Omonia Aradippou)
18	MF	CYP	Manolis Manoli (from Ayia Napa)
11	MF	CYP	Andreas Koullouris (from Achyronas Liopetriou)
7	MF	CYP	Adamos Hadjigeorgiou (on loan from Anorthosis Famagusta)
15	MF	CYP	Panayiotis Mavroudis (from Onisillos Sotira)
9	FW	POR	Bonifácio (from Doxa Katokopias)
1	GK	CYP	Michalis Morfis (from PAEEK FC)
2	DF	CYP	Nicos Photiou (from Nea Salamina)
21	MF	BRA	Wesllem (from (Portugal) Leixões S.C.)
14	MF	POR	Jorge Neves (from (Portugal) C.D. Fátima)
8	MF	ENG	Harrison Bayley (from (England) Hayes & Yeading)
89	FW	CYP	Christos Maouris (from Ethnikos Assia)
93	FW	CYP	Paschalis Chatzithomas (from P.O.Xylotymbou 2006)

Out: Note: Flags indicate national team as defined under FIFA eligibility rules; some limited exceptions apply. Players may hold more than one non-FIFA nationality.

No.	Pos.	Nation	Player
21	MF	AUT	Mato Šimunović (to (Kazakhstan) FC Ordabasy)
26	MF	CYP	Giorgos Panagi (loan return to Alki Larnaca)
70	MF	CYP	Adamos Hadjigeorgiou (loan return to Anorthosis Famagusta)
1	GK	CYP	Christos Mastrou (to Anorthosis Famagusta)
10	FW	CYP	Georgios Tofas (to Enosis Neon Paralimni)
19	FW	CYP	Georgios Kolokoudias (to Ayia Napa)
14	MF	CYP	Demetris Kyriakou (to AEK Larnaca)
71	MF	CYP	Kyriacos Apostolou (to Ermis Aradippou)
18	FW	CYP	Costas Elia (to Achyronas Liopetriou)
16	MF	POR	Hugo Soares (to Ayia Napa)
12	GK	SVK	Pavol Penksa (to (Hungary) ZTE)
78	DF	GRE	Spyros Gogolos (to (Greece) Olympiacos Volos)
30	MF	GRE	Thanasis Pindonis (to (Greece) Olympiacos Volos)
86	MF	SLE	Shaka Bangura (released)
32	FW	SRB	Milan Belić (released)
93	FW	CYP	Paschalis Chatzithomas (on loan to Achyronas Liopetriou)

=== APEP Pitsilia ===
In: Note: Flags indicate national team as defined under FIFA eligibility rules; some limited exceptions apply. Players may hold more than one non-FIFA nationality.

No.	Pos.	Nation	Player
10	FW	CYP	Marios Neophytou (from Akritas Chloraka)
3	DF	CYP	Stefanos Matsoukas (from APOP Kinyras)
18	MF	CYP	Elias Elia (from Aris Limassol)
14	MF	MLI	Manuel Kanté (from Atromitos Yeroskipou)
5	DF	CYP	Michalis Paschali (from Akritas Chloraka)
23	FW	NGA	Marco Tagbajumi (from Akritas Chloraka)
99	DF	COD	Alain Logombe (free agent)

Out: Note: Flags indicate national team as defined under FIFA eligibility rules; some limited exceptions apply. Players may hold more than one non-FIFA nationality.

No.	Pos.	Nation	Player
10	MF	ESP	Juanjo (to Aris Limassol)
15	MF	MAR	Hamid Rhanem (released)
30	MF	CYP	Valentinos Pastellis (to AEZ Zakakiou)
77	GK	CYP	Rafael Christoforou (to Aris Limassol)
2	GK	CYP	Andreas Iakovou (to ENAD Polis Chrysochous)

=== Aris Limassol ===
In: Note: Flags indicate national team as defined under FIFA eligibility rules; some limited exceptions apply. Players may hold more than one non-FIFA nationality.

No.	Pos.	Nation	Player
—	GK	UKR	Stefanos Azof (from (Greece) Veria)
17	GK	CYP	Charalambos Kairinos (from Enosis Neon Parekklisia)
99	FW	CYP	Charalambos Pittakas (from AEP Paphos)
7	MF	GNB	Bafodé Carvalho (from (Portugal) Louletano D.C.)
28	FW	POR	Milton Andrade (from Doxa Katokopias)
8	FW	POR	Pedro Alves (from (Portugal) S.C.U. Torreense)
11	FW	CYP	Andreas Kyprianou (from Omonia Aradippou)
9	FW	CYP	Alekos Alekou (from (Hungary) Soproni VSE)
19	DF	CYP	Kyriakos Pelendritis (from Enosis Neon Parekklisia)
11	MF	CYP	Simos Krassas (from Alki Larnaca)
10	MF	ESP	Juanjo (from APEP)
14	DF	CYP	Marios Ioannou (from Atromitos Yeroskipou)
27	FW	CYP	Ioannis Chadjivasilis (on loan from Omonia)
—	GK	CYP	Rafael Christoforou (from APEP)
4	DF	CYP	Alexandros Demetriou (from AEP Paphos)
40	GK	CYP	Andreas Photiou (from AEK Larnaca)
15	MF	BRA	Wender (from Ethnikos Achna)

Out: Note: Flags indicate national team as defined under FIFA eligibility rules; some limited exceptions apply. Players may hold more than one non-FIFA nationality.

No.	Pos.	Nation	Player
8	MF	BIH	Vladan Grujic (to AEP Paphos)
14	MF	ROU	Claudiu Ionescu (loan return to (Moldova) FC Milsami)
88	MF	POR	Alberto Louzeiro (to (Bulgaria) Beroe Stara Zagora)
29	GK	HUN	Zoltán Kovács (to Nea Salamina)
4	DF	ANG	João Comboio (to Omonia Aradippou)
1	GK	CYP	Giorgos Charalambous (to AEZ Zakakiou)
5	DF	SRB	Dragan Radosavljević (to (Serbia) FK Radnički 1923)
22	MF	SRB	Predrag Lazić (to Ayia Napa)
55	DF	SVK	Maroš Klimpl (released)
3	DF	EST	Andrei Stepanov (released)
10	FW	ARG	Silvio González (to (Argentina) Club Atlético Tigre)
51	GK	CMR	Gilbert N'Djema (released)
69	DF	CMR	Carl Lombe (released)
7	FW	POL	Łukasz Sosin (released)
16	FW	BRA	Gelson Rodrigues (released)
19	MF	CYP	Giorgos Vasiliou (to Apollon Limassol)
30	MF	CYP	Costas Markou (to Nicos & Socratis Erimis)
28	FW	POR	Milton Andrade (released)

=== Chalkanoras Idaliou ===
In: Note: Flags indicate national team as defined under FIFA eligibility rules; some limited exceptions apply. Players may hold more than one non-FIFA nationality.

No.	Pos.	Nation	Player
2	DF	CYP	Giorgos Costa (from Ethnikos Assia)
5	DF	CYP	Theofanis Lagos (from Digenis Morphou)
16	GK	GRE	Giorgos Kaplanidis (from Ethnikos Latsion FC)
8	MF	MDA	Roman Bolbocian (from Digenis Morphou)
22	FW	POR	Ângelo Henriques (from Akritas Chloraka)
10	FW	CYP	Kyriacos Chailis (from PAEEK FC)
15	DF	CYP	Grigoris Grigoriou (from Spartakos Kitiou)

Out: Note: Flags indicate national team as defined under FIFA eligibility rules; some limited exceptions apply. Players may hold more than one non-FIFA nationality.

No.	Pos.	Nation	Player
23	FW	CYP	Valantis Kapartis (loan return to Olympiakos Nicosia)
18	DF	CYP	Iacovos Tsolakides (to Ermis Aradippou)
16	DF	CYP	Apostolos Michael (to Othellos Athienou)
9	FW	LVA	Aleksejs Koļesņikovs (to Othellos Athienou)
12	MF	CYP	Kyriakos Stylianou (to Othellos Athienou)
19	FW	ZIM	Thabani Moyo (released)
6	MF	ROU	Marian Stan (to Adonis Idaliou)
10	DF	CYP	Panayiotis Panayiotou (to PAEEK FC)
24	DF	CYP	Giorgos Georgiou (to Ethnikos Latsion FC)

=== Ermis Aradippou ===
In: Note: Flags indicate national team as defined under FIFA eligibility rules; some limited exceptions apply. Players may hold more than one non-FIFA nationality.

No.	Pos.	Nation	Player
10	MF	CYP	Charis Loizou (from Onisilos Sotira)
25	MF	CYP	Savvas Christodoulou (from Spartakos Kitiou)
18	DF	CYP	Iacovos Tsolakides (from Chalkanoras Idaliou)
21	FW	CYP	Theodosis Kyprou (on loan from Omonia)
3	DF	CYP	Stelios Demetriou (from Apollon Limassol)
20	MF	CYP	Marios Charalambous (on loan from Apollon Limassol)
22	MF	POR	Bruno Rocha (from Adonis Idaliou)
7	MF	CYP	Kyriacos Apostolou (from Anagennisi Dherynia)
16	GK	CYP	Nicolas Anastasiou (free agent)
8	MF	POR	Pedro Lopo (from Othellos Athienou)
11	MF	HUN	Lajos Terjék (from Ayia Napa)
21	MF	CYP	Giorgos Panagi (from Alki Larnaca)
7	FW	ZIM	Obadiah Tarumbwa (from APOP Kinyras)
32	DF	CYP	Constantinos Samaras (from Ethnikos Achna)
25	GK	GRE	Dimitrios Sotiriou (from (Greece) AEL)
26	MF	GRE	Stavros Nicolaou (from (Greece) Thrasyvoulos)
—	DF	CYP	Adamos Constantinou (from Nea Salamina U21)
24	FW	SWE	Michel Adzic (from Doxa Katokopia)

Out: Note: Flags indicate national team as defined under FIFA eligibility rules; some limited exceptions apply. Players may hold more than one non-FIFA nationality.

No.	Pos.	Nation	Player
3	DF	CYP	Stelios Demetriou (to (Bulgaria) Lokomotiv Plovdiv)
64	MF	CYP	Marios Charalambous (loan return to Apollon Limassol)
83	GK	ENG	Corrin Brooks-Meade (loan return to Alki Larnaca)
12	DF	CYP	Angelis Charalambous (to Apollon Limassol)
17	MF	CYP	Demos Goumenos (to Enosis Neon Paralimni)
29	DF	CYP	Demetris Moulazimis (loan return to Enosis Neon Paralimni)
7	FW	CYP	Marios Zannetou (to Onisilos Sotira)
25	MF	CYP	Panayiotis Onisiforou (to ASIL Lysi)
21	MF	GRE	Giannis Goumas (to (Greece) Kerkyra)
23	MF	SEN	Cheikh Gadiaga (to (Greece) Ergotelis)
7	MF	CYP	Kyriacos Apostolou (to Omonia Aradippou)
18	DF	CYP	Iacovos Tsolakides (to Elpida Xylofagou)

=== Ethnikos Assia ===
In: Note: Flags indicate national team as defined under FIFA eligibility rules; some limited exceptions apply. Players may hold more than one non-FIFA nationality.

No.	Pos.	Nation	Player
—	FW	CYP	Christoforos Xenofontos (from Olympiakos Nicosia)
—	DF	GRE	Notis Kestelidis (from (Greece) Makedonikos)
—	GK	GRE	Panayiotis Sampanidis (from (Greece) Iraklis U21)
—	MF	GRE	Periklis Papadopoulos (from (Greece) Elimeia Kozanis)
—	DF	GRE	Vangelis Mangas (from (Greece) Levadiakos U21)
—	GK	CYP	Nikolas Asprogenous (from AEP Paphos)
—	FW	GUI	Dinah Diawara (from ASIL Lysi)
—	DF	CYP	Stelios Mina (from PAEEK FC)
—	FW	LTU	Eimantas Marozas (from PAEEK FC)

Out: Note: Flags indicate national team as defined under FIFA eligibility rules; some limited exceptions apply. Players may hold more than one non-FIFA nationality.

No.	Pos.	Nation	Player
8	FW	CYP	Constantinos Mintikkis (loan return to Anorthosis Famagusta)
10	FW	CYP	Christoforos Christofi (loan return to Anorthosis Famagusta)
21	DF	CYP	Andreas Charalambous (loan return to APOEL)
91	MF	CYP	Marios Theodorou (loan return to APOEL)
19	FW	CYP	Christoforos Xenofontos (loan return to Olympiakos Nicosia)
9	FW	CPV	Mateus Lopes (to Omonia Aradippou)
17	MF	CPV	Bruno Spencer (to AEK Kouklia)
2	DF	CYP	Giorgos Costa (to Chalkanoras Idaliou)
24	DF	CYP	Stelios Mina (to PAEEK FC)
5	DF	CYP	Giannos Stylianou (to PAEEK FC)
6	MF	CYP	Nicolas Violaris (to Adonis Idaliou)
7	FW	CYP	Christos Maouris (to Anagennisi Dherynia)
18	DF	CYP	Demetris Daskalakis (to (Greece) Ergotelis)

=== Nikos & Sokratis Erimis ===
In: Note: Flags indicate national team as defined under FIFA eligibility rules; some limited exceptions apply. Players may hold more than one non-FIFA nationality.

No.	Pos.	Nation	Player
—	DF	GRE	Costas Grigoriou (free agent)
—	MF	CYP	Christos Nicolaou (from Atromitos Yeroskipou)
—	DF	CYP	Giorgos Constanti (from Akritas Chloraka)
14	FW	CYP	Demetris Theofanous (from Enosis Neon Parekklisia)
—	FW	CYP	Michalis Sykas (from Apollon Limassol)
—	MF	CYP	Stavrinos Stylianou (from Apollon Limassol)
30	MF	CYP	Costas Markou (from Aris Limassol)
—	MF	CYP	Rafael Yiangoudakis (from Nea Salamina)

Out: Note: Flags indicate national team as defined under FIFA eligibility rules; some limited exceptions apply. Players may hold more than one non-FIFA nationality.

No.	Pos.	Nation	Player
—	MF	CYP	Constantinos Kissonergis (to AEZ Zakakiou)

=== Omonia Aradippou ===
In: Note: Flags indicate national team as defined under FIFA eligibility rules; some limited exceptions apply. Players may hold more than one non-FIFA nationality.

No.	Pos.	Nation	Player
1	GK	ARG	Ramiro González (free agent)
—	FW	CYP	Constantinos Mintikkis (from Anorthosis Famagusta)
—	DF	CYP	Pieris Kastanas (from Othellos Athienou)
—	MF	EST	Deniss Malov (from MEAP Nisou)
—	FW	CPV	Mateus Lopes (from Ethnikos Assia)
—	MF	POR	Ludgero da Silveira (from Ayia Napa)
—	DF	CYP	Demetris Kattos (from Digenis Morphou)
—	DF	CYP	Kyriacos Kyriacou (from APOP Kinyras)
—	MF	CYP	Petros Filaniotis (from Ethnikos Achna)
—	DF	ANG	João Comboio (from Aris Limassol)
—	MF	CYP	Kyriacos Apostolou (from Ermis Aradippou)

Out: Note: Flags indicate national team as defined under FIFA eligibility rules; some limited exceptions apply. Players may hold more than one non-FIFA nationality.

No.	Pos.	Nation	Player
33	GK	HUN	Zoltán Nagy (retired)
42	MF	BRA	Ricardo Malzoni (released)
86	MF	GNB	Rodilson (released)
11	FW	MAR	Hicham Chirouf (to PAEEK FC)
55	FW	GEO	Levan Kebadze (to Achyronas Liopetriou)
14	DF	CYP	Nicolas Katsouris (to Spartakos Kitiou)
21	FW	CYP	Andreas Kyprianou (to Aris Limassol)
3	DF	CYP	Michalis Michael (to ASIL Lysi)

=== Onisilos Sotira ===
In: Note: Flags indicate national team as defined under FIFA eligibility rules; some limited exceptions apply. Players may hold more than one non-FIFA nationality.

No.	Pos.	Nation	Player
4	DF	CYP	Thomas Kaouras (from Spartakos Kitiou)
—	MF	CYP	Demetris Koumi (from Achironas Liopetriou)
9	MF	CYP	Christos Pierettis (from Ayia Napa)
6	DF	CYP	Panayiotis Kosma (from Ayia Napa)
11	FW	CYP	Costas Georgiou (from Ayia Napa)
8	FW	CYP	Marios Zannetou (from Ermis Aradippou)
83	GK	POL	Michal Kula (from PO Xylotympou)
—	MF	GRE	Kyriakos Kesidis (from (Greece) GAS Svoronos)
1	GK	CYP	Charis Liotatis (from Frenaros FC)
19	FW	CYP	Giorgos Loizou (from Kedros Agias Marinas)
—	DF	CYP	Constantinos Neos (from (England) Altrincham)
14	MF	ARG	Dante Formica (from Ermis Aradippou)
5	DF	CYP	Antonis Moushis (from Ayia Napa)
7	FW	POR	Guti Ribeiro (from (Malta) St. Andrews)

Out: Note: Flags indicate national team as defined under FIFA eligibility rules; some limited exceptions apply. Players may hold more than one non-FIFA nationality.

No.	Pos.	Nation	Player
30	MF	CYP	Charis Loizou (to Ermis Aradippou)
33	FW	CYP	Christoforos Christofi (to Anagennisi Dherynia)
11	MF	GRE	Spyros Kontopoulos (to Othellos Athienou)
9	FW	CYP	Demos Demosthenous (to Othellos Athienou)
13	FW	CYP	Tziovannis Siepis (to Othellos Athienou)
1	GK	SVK	Peter Kostolani (to Othellos Athienou)
7	MF	CYP	Panayiotis Mavroudis (to Anagennisi Dherynia)
16	FW	CYP	Kyriakos Chatziaros (to ASIL Lysi)
83	DF	POL	Paweł Odrzywolski (released)
23	DF	BUL	Kristian Uzunov (to Frenaros FC)
77	MF	CMR	Maurice Hongla (released)
19	FW	SVK	Richard Chorvatovič (released)
26	FW	GUI	Aliou Traore (released)

=== Othellos Athienou ===
In: Note: Flags indicate national team as defined under FIFA eligibility rules; some limited exceptions apply. Players may hold more than one non-FIFA nationality.

No.	Pos.	Nation	Player
4	DF	CYP	Apostolos Michael (from Chalkanoras Idaliou)
3	DF	CYP	Panayiotis Dionysiou (from Ayia Napa)
6	MF	CYP	Andreas Vasiliou (from Adonis Idaliou)
34	DF	CYP	Nicos Efthimiou (on loan from Anorthosis Famagusta)
12	MF	CYP	Kyriakos Stylianou (from Chalkanoras Idaliou)
10	MF	GRE	Spyros Kontopoulos (from Onisilos Sotira)
9	FW	CYP	Demos Demosthenous (from Onisilos Sotira)
19	FW	CYP	Tziovannis Siepis (from Onisilos Sotira)
1	GK	SVK	Peter Kostolani (from Onisilos Sotira)
7	MF	CYP	Nicolas Manoli (from Ayia Napa)
47	FW	LVA	Aleksejs Koļesņikovs (from Chalkanoras Idaliou)
44	DF	CYP	Andreas Chimonas (from Elpida Xylofagou)

Out: Note: Flags indicate national team as defined under FIFA eligibility rules; some limited exceptions apply. Players may hold more than one non-FIFA nationality.

No.	Pos.	Nation	Player
6	MF	IRL	Matthew Cassidy (to (England) Hyde)
9	FW	POL	Adrian Mielec (released)
8	MF	POR	Pedro Lopo (to Ermis Aradippou)
87	FW	CYP	Savvas Pikramenos (to AEK Kouklia)
24	DF	CYP	Pieris Kastanas (to Omonia Aradippou)
10	FW	BIH	Slaviša Dugić (to (Bosnia and Herzegovina) FK Borac Banja Luka)
19	FW	COD	Egola Empela (to Digenis Oroklinis)
11	MF	CYP	Adamos Efstathiou (to PAEEK FC)

=== PAEEK FC ===
In: Note: Flags indicate national team as defined under FIFA eligibility rules; some limited exceptions apply. Players may hold more than one non-FIFA nationality.

No.	Pos.	Nation	Player
2	DF	CYP	Panayiotis Panayiotou (from Chalkanoras Idaliou)
—	MF	GRE	Nikolaos Gavalas (from (Greece) Kallithea)
6	MF	FRA	Sami Cauty (from (France) Bourges)
10	MF	SVN	Miroslav Grbić (from (Slovenia) NK Domžale)
—	MF	SCO	Jordan Lowdon (from (Scotland) Celtic U20)
—	FW	LTU	Eimantas Marozas (from (Poland) Górnik Zabrze)
41	GK	CYP	Kyriacos Ioannou (from Doxa Katokopias)
17	MF	CYP	Marios Theodorou (from APOEL)
21	FW	CYP	Constantinos Constantinou (from APOP Kinyras)
40	MF	CYP	Giorgos Economides (from (England) Barnet)
21	DF	CYP	Stelios Mina (from Ethnikos Assia)
4	DF	CYP	Giannos Stylianou (from Ethnikos Assia)
—	MF	CYP	Pantelis Konomi (from APOEL U21)
—	MF	CYP	Marios Nicolaou (from Olympiakos Nicosia U21)
—	DF	GRE	Nikos Triantafyllou (from (Greece) Ethnikos Asteras)
1	GK	GRE	Alexandros Paschalakis (from (Greece) Levadiakos)
—	DF	GRE	Panayiotis Zonas (from (Greece) Thrasyvoulos)
3	DF	GRE	Giorgos Vidalis (from (Greece) Kallithea)
7	FW	GRE	Christos Kanellopoulos (from (Greece) Fokikos)
11	FW	MAR	Hicham Chirouf (from Omonia Aradippou)
8	MF	GRE	Demetris Toskas (from (Greece) Pierikos)
—	MF	CYP	Adamos Efstathiou (from Othellos Athienou)
—	DF	CYP	Loukas Stylianou (free agent)

Out: Note: Flags indicate national team as defined under FIFA eligibility rules; some limited exceptions apply. Players may hold more than one non-FIFA nationality.

No.	Pos.	Nation	Player
3	DF	IND	Netan Sansara (to (Denmark) FC Vestsjælland)
27	MF	POR	Patrício Telmo (to (Portugal) Sertanense)
11	MF	LVA	Viktors Morozs (to (Latvia) FK Spartaks Jūrmala)
13	MF	BUL	Iliya Tafrov (released)
8	MF	GER	Pascal Nägele (to (Germany) SV Curslack-Neuengamme)
44	DF	MTN	Moise Kandé (released)
1	GK	CYP	Michalis Morfis (to Anagennisi Dherynia)
4	DF	CYP	Sotiris Ptinis (to Ethnikos Latsion FC)
20	FW	CYP	Kyriacos Chailis (to Chalkanoras Idaliou)
—	MF	SCO	Jordan Lowdon (to (Scotland) Brechin City F.C.)
—	DF	GRE	Nikos Triantafyllou (released)
21	DF	CYP	Stelios Mina (to Ethnikos Assia)
—	FW	LTU	Eimantas Marozas (to Ethnikos Assia)

== See also ==
- (Bulgaria) List of Bulgarian football transfers summer 2012
- (Netherlands) List of Dutch football transfers summer 2012
- (England) List of English football transfers summer 2012
- (Malta) List of Maltese football transfers summer 2012
- (Germany) List of German football transfers summer 2012
- (Greece) List of Greek football transfers summer 2012
- (Portugal) List of Portuguese football transfers summer 2012
- (Spain) List of Spanish football transfers summer 2012
- (Latvia) List of Latvian football transfers summer 2012
- (Serbia) List of Serbian football transfers summer 2012
