= 2015–16 Gamma Ethniki =

Gamma Ethniki
- Season: 2015–16

The 2015–16 Gamma Ethniki was the 33rd season since the official establishment of the third tier of Greek football in 1983. It started on 27 September 2015 and ended on 8 May 2016.

64 teams were separated into four groups, according to geographical criteria.

Zakynthiakos and Paniliakos withdrew from the league before the group draw.

== Group 1 ==
=== Teams ===
Location of teams in Group 1 of 2015–16 Gamma Ethniki

Team	Location	Last season
Nestos Chrysoupoli	Chrysoupoli	EPS Kavala champion, promotion play-off Group 1 winner
~~Serres F.C.~~	~~Serres~~	~~FL North, 12th~~
Apollon Kalamarias	Kalamaria	FL North, 11th
Vyzantio Kokkinochoma	Kokkinochoma	Group 1, 9th
Kavala	Kavala	Group 1, 3rd
Ethnikos Neo Agioneri	Neo Agioneri	Group 1, 6th
Evros Soufli	Soufli	Group 1, 11th
Ethnikos Alexandroupoli	Alexandroupoli	Group 1, 10th
APE Langadas	Langadas	EPS Macedonia champion, promotion play-off Group 2 winner
Kampaniakos	Chalastra	Group 1, 5th
Aris	Thessaloniki	Group 1, 2nd
Iraklis Ambelokipi	Ampelokipi	Group 1, 7th
Apollon Krya Vrysi	Krya Vrysi	EPS Pella champion, promotion play-off Group 3 winner
Eordaikos	Ptolemaida	EPS Kozani champion, promotion play-off Group 4 winner
Doxa Drama	Drama	Group 1, 4th
Thyella Filotas	Filotas	Group 1, 8th
Kozani	Kozani	Group 2, 10th

=== Standings ===
Pos	Team	Pld	W	D	L	GF	GA	GD	Pts	Promotion or relegation
1	Aris (C, P)	32	28	3	1	76	17	+59	87	Promotion to Football League
2	Nestos Chrysoupoli	32	21	3	8	66	35	+31	66	
3	Doxa Dramas	32	18	9	5	47	24	+23	63	
4	Kavala	32	16	10	6	53	24	+29	58	
5	Apollon Kalamarias	32	16	5	11	46	29	+17	53	
6	APE Langadas	32	15	8	9	50	34	+16	53	
7	Ethnikos Neo Agioneri	32	14	8	10	34	24	+10	50	
8	Kampaniakos	32	13	8	11	45	31	+14	47	
9	Eordaikos	32	12	10	10	35	35	0	46	
10	Kozani (R)	32	13	5	14	41	49	−8	44	Relegation to FCA championships
11	Vyzantio Kokkinochoma (R)	32	11	4	17	46	50	−4	37	Relegation to FCA championships
12	Thyella Filotas (R)	32	10	5	17	32	38	−6	35	Relegation to FCA championships
13	Apollon Krya Vrysi (R)	32	9	7	16	27	43	−16	34	Relegation to FCA championships
14	Iraklis Ambelokipi (R)	32	8	4	20	32	57	−25	28	Relegation to FCA championships
15	Ethnikos Alexandroupoli (R)	32	6	9	17	20	45	−25	25 (Note: Ethnikos Alexandroupoli deducted two points for this season and also two points for the 2016–17 season by Hellenic Football Federation.)	Relegation to FCA championships
16	Evros Soufli (R)	32	5	7	20	32	86	−54	22	Relegation to FCA championships
17	Serres F.C. (R)	32	2	5	25	10	71	−61	5 (Note: Serres F.C. withdrew from the league on 1 January 2016. They were deducted six points for this season and also six points for the 2016–17 season by Hellenic Football Federation.)	Relegation to FCA championships

Source: Hellenic Football Federation (in Greek)
Rules for classification: 1st points; 2nd head-to-head points; 3rd head-to-head goal difference
(C) Champions; (P) Promoted; (R) Relegated

== Group 2 ==
=== Teams ===
Location of teams in Group 2 of 2015–16 Gamma Ethniki

Team	Location	Last season
Pydna Kitros	Kitros	EPS Pierias champion, promotion play-off Group 6 winner
Pierikos	Katerini	FL North, 8th & North Group Relegation Play-offs, 6th
Oikonomos	Tsaritsani	Group 2, 8th
Dotieas Agia	Agia	Group 2, 11th
Ethnikos Filippiada	Filippiada	Group 2, 9th
Aiginiakos	Aiginio	FL North, 7th & North Group Relegation Play-offs, 5th
Thesprotos	Igoumenitsa	Group 2, 5th
A.E. Karaiskakis	Arta	Group 2, 2nd
Acheron Kanallaki	Kanallaki	EPS Preveza-Lefkada champion, promotion play-off Group 8 winner
A.E. Farkadona	Farkadona	EPS Trikala champion, promotion play-off Group 5 winner
Achilleas Neokaisareia	Neokaisareia	Group 2, 3rd
Niki Volos	Nea Ionia Volos	SL, 17th (they were actually relegated to Football League, but they voluntarily relegated one more category lower, to Third Division)
Rigas Feraios	Velestino	Group 2, 7th
Pyrasos	Nea Anchialos	Group 2, 6th
Tyrnavos	Tyrnavos	FL North, 10th & North Group Relegation Play-offs, 4th
Opountios	Martino	Group 2, 4th
~~Fokikos~~	~~Amfissa~~	~~FL North, 13th~~

=== Standings ===
Pos	Team	Pld	W	D	L	GF	GA	GD	Pts	Promotion or relegation
1	Aiginiakos (C, P)	32	25	3	4	74	20	+54	78	Promotion to Football League
2	A.E. Karaiskakis	32	20	9	3	52	24	+28	69	
3	Niki Volos	32	18	10	4	47	22	+25	64	
4	Pydna Kitros	32	18	8	6	50	22	+28	62	
5	Thesprotos	32	14	10	8	43	29	+14	52	
6	Rigas Feraios	32	14	9	9	43	28	+15	51	
7	Pierikos	32	14	12	6	35	24	+11	48 (Note: Pierikos were deducted six points for this season by Football League.)	
8	Achilleas Neokaisareia	32	14	6	12	46	49	−3	48	
9	Ethnikos Filippiada	32	10	10	12	23	25	−2	40	
10	Pyrasos (R)	32	10	9	13	32	38	−6	39	Relegation to FCA championships
11	Oikonomos (R)	32	10	9	13	32	47	−15	39	Relegation to FCA championships
12	Dotieas Agia (R)	32	9	7	16	24	37	−13	34	Relegation to FCA championships
13	Tyrnavos (R)	32	7	12	13	25	30	−5	33	Relegation to FCA championships
14	Acheron Kanallaki (R)	32	8	7	17	21	33	−12	31	Relegation to FCA championships
15	Opountios (R)	32	5	12	15	23	36	−13	27	Relegation to FCA championships
16	A.E. Farkadona (R)	32	5	4	23	29	64	−35	13 (Note: A.E. Farkadona were deducted six points for this season by Hellenic Football Federation.)	Relegation to FCA championships
17	Fokikos (R)	32	0	5	27	9	80	−71	−1 (Note: Fokikos withdrew from the league on 1 January 2016. They were deducted six points for this season and also six points for the 2016–17 season by Hellenic Football Federation.)	Relegation to FCA championships

Source: Source
Rules for classification: 1st points; 2nd head-to-head points; 3rd head-to-head goal difference
(C) Champions; (P) Promoted; (R) Relegated

== Group 3 ==
=== Teams ===
Location of teams in Group 3 of 2015–16 Gamma Ethniki

Team	Location	Last season
Kanaris Nenita	Nenita	EPS Chios champion, promotion play-off Group 10 winner
Kalamata	Kalamata	Group 3, 7th
Panargiakos	Argos	Group 3, 2nd
Chalkida	Chalkida	EPS Evia champion, promotion play-off Group 7 winner
PAO Varda	Varda	Group 3, 10th
Doxa Nea Manolada	Nea Manolada	Group 3, 5th
Panarkadikos	Tripoli	Group 3, 6th
~~Iraklis Psachna~~	~~Psachna~~	~~FL South, 10th & North Group Relegation Play-offs, 5th~~
Sparti	Sparta	EPS Laconia champion, promotion play-off Group 13 winner
Vyzas	Megara	Group 3, 9th
Levante	Agioi Pantes, Galaro	EPS Zakynthos champion, promotion play-off Group 12 winner
Enosi Ermionida	Kranidi	FL South, 5th & North Group Relegation Play-offs, 4th
A.O.Loutraki	Loutraki	Group 3, 8th
Aiolikos	Mytilene	Group 3, 3rd

=== Standings ===
Pos	Team	Pld	W	D	L	GF	GA	GD	Pts	Promotion or relegation
1	Sparti (C, P)	26	18	5	3	43	16	+27	59	Promotion to Football League
2	Panargiakos	26	15	6	5	45	23	+22	51	
3	Panarkadikos	26	15	6	5	38	17	+21	51	
4	Aiolikos	26	14	5	7	55	24	+31	47	
5	PAO Varda	26	13	5	8	39	27	+12	44	
6	A.O.Loutraki	26	11	8	7	35	24	+11	41	
7	Doxa Nea Manolada	26	12	4	10	34	30	+4	40	
8	Enosi Ermionida	26	10	8	8	33	28	+5	38	
9	Chalkida	26	10	7	9	29	16	+13	37	
10	Kalamata (R)	26	9	4	13	27	31	−4	31	Relegation to FCA championships
11	Vyzas (R)	26	9	3	14	25	47	−22	30	Relegation to FCA championships
12	Levante (R)	26	5	2	19	22	62	−40	17	Relegation to FCA championships
13	Kanaris Nenita (R)	26	4	4	18	17	48	−31	16	Relegation to FCA championships
14	Iraklis Psachna (R)	26	3	1	22	7	56	−49	4 (Note: Iraklis Psachna withdrew from the league on 19 February 2016. They were deducted six points for this season and also six points for the 2016–17 season by Hellenic Football Federation.)	Relegation to FCA championships

Source: Hellenic Football Federation (in Greek)
Rules for classification: 1st points; 2nd head-to-head points; 3rd head-to-head goal difference
(C) Champions; (P) Promoted; (R) Relegated

== Group 4 ==
=== Teams ===
Location of teams in Group 4 of 2015–16 Gamma Ethniki

Team	Location	Last season
A.E. Irakleio	Irakleio	EPS Athens champion, promotion play-off Group 9 winner
Fostiras	Tavros	FL South, 12th
P.A.O. Krousonas	Krousonas	Group 4, 9th
Ermis Zoniana	Zoniana	EPS Rethymno champion, promotion play-off Group 14 winner
AO Trachones Alimos	Alimos	FL South, 11th
OFI	Heraklion	SL, 16th (they were actually relegated to Football League, but they voluntarily relegated one more category lower, to Third Division)
Glyfada	Glyfada	Group 4, 6th
Ilisiakos	Zografou	Group 4, 10th
A.E. Kifisia	Kifisia	Group 4, 2nd
Triglia Rafina	Rafina	Group 4, 8th
Asteras Vari	Vari	Group 4, 5th
Atromitos Piraeus	Piraeus (Kaminia neighborhood)	Group 4, 4th
Ethnikos Piraeus	Piraeus	Group 4, 7th
Ionikos	Nikaia	Group 4, 3rd
Episkopi	Rethimno	FL South, 9th & North Group Relegation Play-offs, 6th
Ialysos	Ialysos	EPS Dodecanese champion, promotion play-off Group 11 winner

=== Standings ===
Pos	Team	Pld	W	D	L	GF	GA	GD	Pts	Promotion or relegation
1	OFI (C, P)	30	21	5	4	53	11	+42	68	Promotion to Football League
2	Fostiras	30	19	6	5	43	22	+21	63	
3	Triglia Rafina	30	16	9	5	44	25	+19	57	
4	Ethnikos Piraeus	30	17	5	8	44	29	+15	56	
5	Ialysos	30	16	7	7	41	31	+10	55	
6	Ermis Zoniana	30	15	5	10	45	37	+8	50	
7	Ionikos	30	14	7	9	37	23	+14	49	
8	Ilisiakos	30	14	4	12	37	28	+9	46	
9	A.E. Kifisia	30	13	7	10	38	32	+6	46	
10	Asteras Vari (R)	30	11	8	11	33	30	+3	41	Relegation to FCA championships
11	P.A.O. Krousonas (R)	30	9	5	16	28	43	−15	32	Relegation to FCA championships
12	Atromitos Piraeus (R)	30	8	8	14	26	42	−16	32	Relegation to FCA championships
13	Episkopi (R)	30	7	8	15	29	31	−2	29	Relegation to FCA championships
14	A.E. Irakleio (R)	30	7	5	18	41	55	−14	26	Relegation to FCA championships
15	Glyfada (R)	30	3	4	23	19	55	−36	10 (Note: Glyfada was deducted three points for this season by Hellenic Football Federation.)	Relegation to FCA championships
16	AO Trachones Alimos (R)	30	2	3	25	16	66	−50	9	Relegation to FCA championships

Source: Source
Rules for classification: 1st points; 2nd head-to-head points; 3rd head-to-head goal difference
(C) Champions; (P) Promoted; (R) Relegated
