= Sadik Balarabe =

English association football player

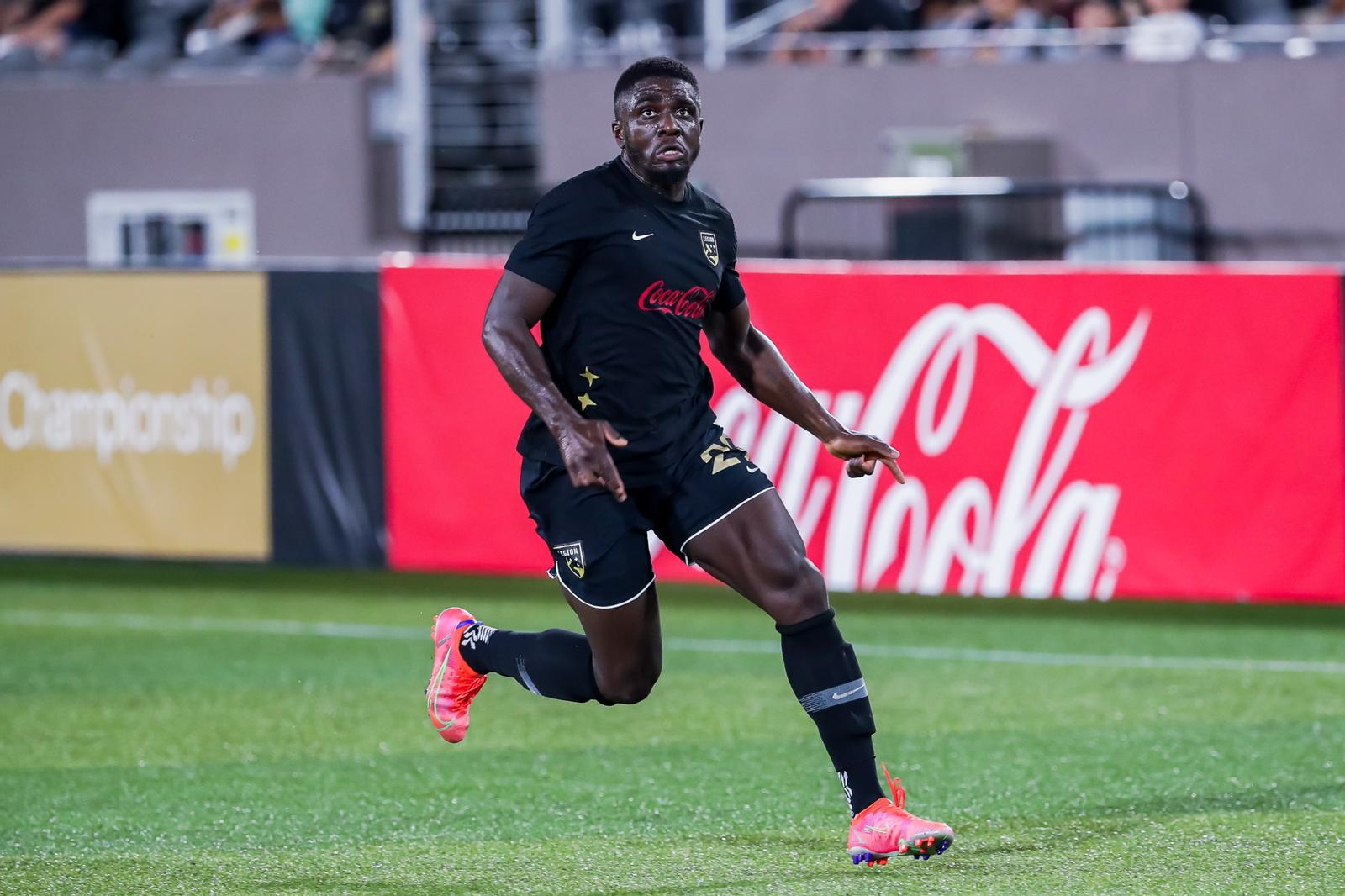
- Balarabe in action for Birmingham Legion

Personal information
- Full name: Sadik Olaniyi Salisu Balarabe
- Date of birth: 26 June 1992 (age 34)
- Place of birth: London, England
- Height: 1.80 m (5 ft 11 in)
- Position: Forward

Team information
- Current team: Aslanköy GSD (on loan from Mağusa Türk Gücü)

Youth career
- Reading

College career
Years	Team	Apps	(Gls)
2011–2012	Jackson Jets	29	(30)
2013–2014	Saginaw Valley State Cardinals	17	(5)

Senior career*
Years	Team	Apps	(Gls)
2013	Chicago Inferno	5	(1)
2014	AO Levante		
2015	Iraklis Psachna	13	(1)
2015–2016	Niki Volos	20	(4)
2016–2017	Gil Vicente	0	(0)
2017–2018	Torbalispor	22	(13)
2018	Salihli Belediyespor	7	(2)
2019	Mağusa Türk Gücü	15	(4)
2019–2020	Urraca	20	(11)
2020	Ibiza Islas Pitiusas	5	(3)
2020	Hemel Hempstead Town	3	(2)
2020	Dulwich Hamlet	3	(0)
2021	Cray Wanderers	4	(0)
2021–2022	Mağusa Türk Gücü	25	(7)
2022	Birmingham Legion	12	(2)
2023	Welling United	3	(0)
2023	Erith & Belvedere	0	(0)
2023–2024	VCD Athletic	11	(0)
2025	Mağusa Türk Gücü	14	(0)
2025–	→ Aslanköy GSD (loan)	0	(0)
- * Club domestic league appearances and goals as of 14:55, 4 December 2024 (UTC)

Sadik Olaniyi Balarabe (born 26 June 1992) is an English footballer who plays as a forward for Aslanköy GSD on loan from Mağusa Türk Gücü.

== Career ==
In 2011, Balarabe headed to America to study at Jackson College, scoring 11 goals in 12 games in his first season and a further 19 goals in his second year. He spent two years studying at Jackson College before finishing his studies with Saginaw Valley State University, who he scored six goals in 17 games for in the 2013 season. He also played in the USL Premier Development League for Chicago Inferno, making five appearances.

In the summer of 2014, Balarabe arrived in Greece to join AO Levante before moving up divisions to join Greek Football League side Iraklis Psachna. in January 2015. He made his professional debut on 26 January, coming on as a 65th minute substitute in a 0–0 draw with Kallithea.

Ahead of the following season, Balarabe joined Gamma Ethniki side Niki Volos in July 2015.

He then joined Portuguese LigaPro side Gil Vicente on a two-year deal in September 2016.

In January 2019, he joined KTFF Süper Lig side Mağusa Türk Gücü after spells in Turkey with Torbalispor and Salihli Belediyespor. Balarabe finished the season with 16 goals in 22 games as he helped lead his side to the league and cup double.

On 10 August 2019, Balarabe joined Tercera División side Urraca. After half a season with Urraca, he joined fellow Tercera División side Ibiza Islas Pitiusas until the end of the season.

In October 2020, Balarabe returned to England to join National League South side Hemel Hempstead Town. He scored on his debut after coming on as a substitute in a 4–1 loss to Eastbourne Borough. The following month, he joined division rivals Dulwich Hamlet, making his debut in a 3–1 defeat against Havant & Waterlooville.

In May 2021, Balarabe joined Isthmian League side Cray Wanderers.

In September 2021, Balarabe returned to Northern Cyprus to rejoin Mağusa Türk Gücü.

In July 2022, Balarabe returned to America for the first time since completing college to join USL Championship side Birmingham Legion. Balarabe scored on his debut coming off the bench against Atlanta United 2. Following the 2022 season, Balarabe was released by Birmingham.

In March 2023, Balarabe joined National League South side Welling United on a deal until the end of the season. Later that day, he scored on his debut against Ebbsfleet United in the Kent Senior Cup.

In February 2023, he joined Ykkönen side FF Jaro on trial, playing one match in the cup.

In September 2023, Balarabe joined Isthmian League side Erith & Belvedere. He made five appearances for the club all in the cup, scoring two goals. He later went on to play for Southern Counties East Football League side VCD Athletic. He later spent time playing in Sunday league football for Under The Radar alongside YouTubers TBJZL and Manny.

After a spell back at Mağusa Türk Gücü, Balarabe joined fellow Northern Cyprus side Aslanköy GSD on loan in July 2025.

== Personal life ==
Balarabe attended Stationers' Crown Woods Academy in Eltham whilst growing up.

== Career statistics ==
As of 16 May 2022

Appearances and goals by club, season and competition
Club	Season	League			Cup		Continental		Other		Total	
Club	Season	Division	Apps	Goals	Apps	Goals	Apps	Goals	Apps	Goals	Apps	Goals
Chicago Inferno	2013	PDL	5	1	0	0	—		0	0	5	1
Iraklis Psachna	2014–15	Football League	13	1	0	0	—		0	0	13	1
Niki Volos	2015–16	Gamma Ethniki	20	4	0	0	—		0	0	20	4
Torbalispor	2017–18	Bölgesel Amatör Ligi	22	13	0	0	—		0	0	22	13
Salihli Belediyespor	2018–19	Bölgesel Amatör Ligi	7	2	0	0	—		0	0	7	2
Mağusa Türk Gücü	2018–19	KTFF Süper Lig	15	4	7	12	—		0	0	22	16
Urraca	2019–20	Tercera División	20	11	1 (Note: Appearances in Copa del Rey)	0	—		0	0	21	11
Ibiza Islas Pitiusas	2019–20	Tercera División	5	3	0	0	—		1 (Note: Appearances in Tercera División play-offs)	0	6	3
Hemel Hempstead Town	2020–21	National League South	3	2	1	0	—		0	0	4	2
Dulwich Hamlet	2020–21	National League South	3	0	0	0	—		0	0	3	0
Cray Wanderers	2021–22	Isthmian League Premier Division	4	0	0	0	—		0	0	4	0
Mağusa Türk Gücü	2021–22	KTFF Süper Lig	25	7	7	6	—		0	0	32	13
Career total			142	48	17	18	0	0	1	0	160	66

== Honours ==
Mağusa Türk Gücü

- KTFF Süper Lig: 2018–2019, 2021–22
- Cypriot Cup: 2019, 2022

Individual

- Cypriot Cup Golden Boot: 2019, 2022
