= Liveris =

Liveris is a surname. Notable people with the surname include:

- Andrew Liveris (born 1954), Australian executive
- Georgios Liveris (born 1932), Greek sports shooter
- Stelios Liveris (born 1984), Greek footballer

== See also ==
- Liveri, municipality in Italy
- Liveris Andritsos (born 1959) Greek basketballer
