= Ibrahima Baldé =

Ibrahima Baldé may refer to:

- Ibrahima Baldé (footballer, born 1989), Senegalese football forward
- Ibrahima Baldé (footballer, born 2003), French football forward

== See also ==
- Ibraima Baldé (born 1986), Bissau-Guinean former football striker
