= Stathis Karamalikis =

Greek footballer

Personal information
- Full name: Efstathios Karamalikis
- Date of birth: 4 December 1981 (age 44)
- Place of birth: Zakynthos, Greece
- Height: 1.88 m (6 ft 2 in)
- Position: Striker

Team information
- Current team: Zakynthos

Youth career
- Zakynthiakos

Senior career*
Years	Team	Apps	(Gls)
2003–2004	Diagoras	30	(25)
2004–2008	Ethnikos Piraeus	84	(28)
2007	→ Levadiakos (loan)	15	(7)
2008	→ Ilioupoli (loan)	22	(16)
2008–2010	Thrasyvoulos	47	(16)
2009	→ Panetolikos (loan)	13	(6)
2010–2012	Panetolikos	38	(7)
2012–2013	Apollon Smyrnis	29	(5)
2013–2015	Zakynthiakos	43	(42)
2015–2016	Zakynthos	11	(0)
2016	Tsivili		
2016–2018	Katastari		
2018–2019	Zakynthos		

Managerial career
- 2018–2020: Zakynthos
- 2021–2023: Ethnikos Skoulikado
- 2023–2024: Zakynthos
- * Club domestic league appearances and goals

Stathis Karamalikis (Greek: Στάθης Καραμαλίκης; born 4 December 1981) is a Greek former professional football who played as a striker.
