= Zakynthos Football Clubs Association =

Association football governing body in Zakynthos Prefecture, Greece

- Full name: Zakynthos Football Clubs Association; Greek: Ένωση Ποδοσφαιρικών Σωματείων Ζακύνθου
- Short name: Zakynthos F.C.A.; Greek: Ε.Π.Σ. Ζακύνθου
- Founded: 1987; 39 years ago
- Headquarters: Zakynthos, Greece
- FIFA affiliation: Hellenic Football Federation
- President: Nikolaos Kontonis
- Website: epszakynthos.gr

Zakynthos Football Clubs Association (Greek: Ένωση Ποδοσφαιρικών Σωματείων Ζακύνθου) is one of the newest Greek amateur association football governing bodies, representing teams from Zakynthos Prefecture. The association was founded in 1987 after breaking up from Elis Football Clubs Association. Its offices are housed in Zakynthos and it is a member of Hellenic Football Federation.

== Organization ==
The association and organizes a regional football league and cup.

== Championships ==
The structure of the E.P.S. Zakynthos league is as follows:

- 1st Division (8 Teams)
- 2nd Division (10 Teams)

Source: and

== List of champions ==
=== Championships ===
- 1987–88 A.P.S. Zakynthos
- 1988–89 A.E.S. Esperos
- 1989–90 A.P.S. Zakynthos
- 1990–91 A.E.S. Esperos
- 1991–92 Angerikos
- 1992–93 A.E.S. Esperos
- 1993–94 A.P.S. Zakynthos
- 1994–95 Angerikos
- 1995–96 Pantokratora AC
- 1996–97 A.P.S. Zakynthos
- 1997–98 Doxa Lithakia
- 1998–99 A.O. Asteras Macherado
- 1999–00 A.E. Lagana
- 2000–01 A.O.P. Stratos
- 2001–02 A.O. Asteras Macherado
- 2002–03 Aris Agios Dimitrios
- 2003–04 A.O. Tsilivi
- 2004–05 A.O. Asteras Macherado
- 2005–06 Z.A.G.O. Peiratis Laganas
- 2006–07 A.O. Tsilivi
- 2007–08 A.O. Katastari
- 2008–09 A.O. Tsilivi
- 2009–10 A.O.Asteras Macherado
- 2010–11 A.O. Tsilivi
- 2011–12 Thiella Ampelokipon A.O.
- 2012–13 Thiella Ampelokipon A.O.
- 2013–14 A.O.P. Zakynthiakos
- 2014–15 A.O. Levante
- 2015–16 A.O. Tsilivi
- 2016–17 A.O.P. Zakynthiakos
- 2017–18 A.O. Katastari
- 2018–19 A.O. Tsilivi
- 2019–20 A.O. Ethnikos Skoulikadou
- 2020–21 cancelled due to COVID pandemic
- 2021–22 A.O. Tsilivi
- 2022–23 A.O. Levante
- 2023–24 Thiella Ampelokipon A.O.
- 2024–25 Thiella Ampelokipon A.O.
- 2025–26 Thiella Ampelokipon A.O.

=== Performance by club ===
Club	Titles	Season
A.O. Tsilivi	7	2004, 2007, 2009, 2011, 2016, 2019, 2022
Thiella Ampelokipon A.O.	5	2012, 2013, 2024, 2025, 2026
A.P.S. Zakynthos	4	1988, 1990, 1994, 1997
A.O. Asteras Macherado	4	1999, 2002, 2005, 2010
A.E.S. Esperos	3	1989, 1991, 1993
Angerikos	2	1992, 1995
A.O.P. Zakynthiakos	2	2014, 2017
A.O. Katastari	2	2008, 2018
A.O. Levante	2	2015, 2023
Pantokratora AC	1	1996
Doxa Lithakia	1	1998
A.E. Lagana	1	2000
A.O.P. Stratos	1	2001
Aris Agios Dimitrios	1	2003
Z.A.G.O. Peiratis Laganas	1	2006
A.O. Ethnikos Skoulikadou	1	2020

=== Cup ===
- 1987–88 A.P.S. Zakynthos
- 1988–89 A.P.S. Zakynthos
- 1989–90 A.P.S. Zakynthos
- 1990–91 A.P.S. Zakynthos
- 1991–92 A.P.S. Zakynthos
- 1992–93 A.P.S. Zakynthos
- 1993–94 A.P.S. Zakynthos
- 1994–95 A.P.S. Zakynthos
- 1995–96 A.P.S. Zakynthos
- 1996–97 A.P.S. Zakynthos
- 1997–98 A.P.S. Zakynthos
- 1998–99 A.P.S. Zakynthos
- 1999–00 A.P.S. Zakynthos
- 2000–01 A.O. Asteras Macherado
- 2001–02 A.P.S. Zakynthos
- 2002–03 A.O. Asteras Macherado
- 2003–04 A.P.S. Zakynthos
- 2004–05 A.P.S. Zakynthos
- 2005–06 A.P.S. Zakynthos
- 2006–07 Z.A.G.O. Peiratis Laganas
- 2007–08 A.O. Tsilivi
- 2008–09 A.O. Katastari
- 2009–10 A.O. Tsilivi
- 2010–11 A.O. Tsilivi
- 2011–12 Thiella Ampelokipon A.O.
- 2012–13 Thiella Ampelokipon A.O.
- 2013–14 A.O.P. Zakynthiakos
- 2014–15 A.O. Levante
- 2015–16 A.O. Katastari
- 2016–17 A.O. Katastari
- 2017–18 A.O. Tsilivi
- 2018–19 A.O. Katastari
- 2019–20 AE Agiou Leon/Koiliomenou
- 2020–21 cancelled due to COVID pandemic
- 2021–22 A.O. Katastari
- 2022–23 A.P.S. Zakynthos
- 2023–24 A.P.S. Zakynthos
- 2024–25 A.P.S. Zakynthos
- 2025–26 A.P.S. Zakynthos

=== Performance by club ===
Club	Titles	Season
A.P.S. Zakynthos	21	1988, 1989, 1990, 1991, 1992, 1993, 1994, 1995, 1996, 1997, 1998, 1999, 2000, 2002, 2004, 2005, 2006, 2023, 2024, 2025, 2026
A.O. Katastari	5	2009, 2016, 2017, 2019, 2022
A.O. Tsilivi	4	2008, 2010, 2011, 2018
A.O. Asteras Macherado	2	2001, 2003
Thiella Ampelokipon A.O.	2	2012, 2013
Z.A.G.O. Peiratis Laganas	1	2007
A.O.P. Zakynthiakos	1	2014
A.O. Levante	1	2015
AE Agiou Leon/Koiliomenou	1	2020

== Teams in national divisions ==
Two teams participate in national divisions in the 2026–27 season :

- Super League Greece 2
  - Zakynthos
- Gamma Ethniki:
  - A.O. Levante
