= Stelios Liveris =

Greek footballer

Personal information
- Full name: Stylianos Liveris
- Date of birth: 8 December 1984 (age 41)
- Place of birth: Zakynthos, Greece
- Height: 1.69 m (5 ft 7 in)
- Position: Midfielder

Youth career
- Zakynthiakos

Senior career*
Years	Team	Apps	(Gls)
–2002	Zakynthiakos		
2002–2004	Zakynthos		
2004–2006	Paniliakos	49	(1)
2006–2007	Kalamata	12	(0)
2007–2012	Zakynthos	55	(15)
2012–2013	Thyella Ampelokipoi		
2013–2016	Zakynthiakos		
2016–2018	Katastari		
2018–2021	Tsivili		
2021–2022	Ethnikos Skoulikados		
2022–2023	Tsivili		
2023–2026	Zakynthos		
- * Club domestic league appearances and goals

Stelios Liveris (Greek: Στέλιος Λιβέρης) is a Greek footballer who plays as a midfielder.

== Career ==
Stelios Livers has played for Paniliakos and Kalamata in Beta Ethniki the 2nd higher division of Greece. The next 5 seasons he plays for Zakynthos in 4th (2007–2008) and 3rd (2008–2012) division of Greece.
