= Apostolos Stikas =

Greek footballer

Personal information
- Date of birth: 20 September 1996 (age 30)
- Place of birth: Patras, Greece
- Height: 1.85 m (6 ft 1 in)
- Position: Centre-back

Team information
- Current team: Zakynthos
- Number: 22

Youth career
- Panegialios

Senior career*
Years	Team	Apps	(Gls)
2014–2018	Panegialios	37	(1)
2018	Racing Fondi	0	(0)
2018–2019	Cesena	8	(2)
2018–2019	→ Mezzolara (loan)	17	(2)
2019–2021	Kavala	35	(2)
2021	Chania	0	(0)
2022	Kavala	24	(1)
2022−2023	Veria	11	(0)
2023–2024	Niki Volos	21	(1)
2024	Kalamata	0	(0)
2025	Kavala	13	(2)
2025–2026	Anagennisi Karditsa	14	(2)
2026	Kavala	9	(0)
2026–	Zakynthos	3	(0)
- * Club domestic league appearances and goals as of 19 September 2026

Apostolos Stikas (Greek: Απόστολος Στίκας; born 20 September 1996) is a Greek professional footballer who plays as a centre-back for Super League 2 club Zakynthos.

== Career statistics ==
=== Club ===
As of match played 3 June 2025

Appearances and goals by club, season and competition
Club	Season	League			National cup (Note: Includes Greek Cup)		Continental		Other		Total	
Club	Season	Division	Apps	Goals	Apps	Goals	Apps	Goals	Apps	Goals	Apps	Goals
Panegialios	2015-16	Football League	3	0	–		–		–		3	0
Panegialios	2016-17	Football League	24	1	1	0	–		–		25	1
Panegialios	2017-18	Football League	10	0	3	0	–		–		13	0
Panegialios	Total		37	1	4	0	–		–		41	1
Cesena	2018-19	Serie D	8	2	–		–		–		8	2
Mezzolara (loan)	2018-19	Serie D	17	2	–		–		–		17	2
Kavala	2019-20	Football League	19	0	2	0	–		–		21	0
Kavala	2020-21	Football League	18	2	–		–		–		18	2
Kavala	2021-22	Super League Greece 2	24	1	–		–		–		24	1
Kavala	Total		61	3	2	0	–		–		63	7
Chania	2021-22	Super League Greece 2	1	0	–		–		–		1	0
Veria	2022-23	Super League Greece 2	15	1	2	0	–		–		17	1
Niki Volos	2023-24	Super League Greece 2	21	1	5	0	–		–		26	1
Kavala	2024-25	Super League Greece 2	13	2	–		–		–		13	2
Anagennisi Karditsa	2025-26	Super League Greece 2	–		–		–		–		–	–
Career Total			173	12	13	0	–		–		186	12
