= A.P.S. Zakynthos =

Association football club in Greece

- Full name: Athlitikos Podosfairikos Sillogos Zakynthos
- Nickname: Κυανοκίτρινοι (The Blue-Yellows)
- Founded: 1961; 65 years ago
- Ground: Zakynthians Olympic Champions Ground
- Capacity: 2,000
- Chairman: Dionysis Rapsomanikis
- Manager: Ilias Fyntanis
- League: Super League Greece 2
- 2025–26: Gamma Ethniki (Group 4), 2nd (promoted)
- Website: https://zakynthosfc.com/
Home colours	Away colours

A.P.S. Zakynthos (Greek: Α.Π.Σ. Ζάκυνθος, Αθλητικός Ποδοσφαιρικός Σύλλογος Ζάκυνθος) is a Greek professional football club, based in Zakynthos. It was founded in 1961.

== History ==
The club was officially founded in 1969 after the merger of two other local clubs, one of them founded in 1961, explaining the older foundation date on the team's logo.

The team had the chance to win promotion to Beta Ethniki in 1973 and in 1975 when they won the local championship of Elis - Zakynthos, thus taking part to the promotion play-offs against other local unions' champions from southern Greece.

However, they failed to be promoted, finishing in their promotion group's 2nd place both times while only the 1st teams of each play-off group were to be promoted.

From the middle of the 1970s until the early 1980s, the team was participating in a new amateur championship named "Ethniki Erasitechniki", which was the 3rd highest level of football at the time in Greece. It is also the first format of the today's Gamma Ethniki championship. In 1982, the club was relegated to newly created Greek 4th National Division and in 1987 when they were relegated to local championships.

The years that followed the club was constantly promoting and relegating between Delta Ethniki and Zakynthos' local championship.

Finally in 1997, they were able to avoid being relegated again from Delta Ethniki. In the years that followed they kept performing continuously in the league by regularly finishing in the top-half of the table.

In 2006, they were promoted for their first ever time to semi-professional Gamma Ethniki after winning the championship in Delta Ethniki's 6th Group.

However, their debut in the division was not ideal and they were relegated again in the 4th tier of Greece after finishing last in their group in 2006–07 season.

They re-won the title in their group the next season, though, and were instantly repromoted to Gamma Ethniki where they stabilized. In 2011–12 season the team achieved its highest ever position finishing 3rd in their group and competing in the promotion play-offs without success.

=== Beta Ethniki ===
After finishing 7th in the Northern Group of 2013 Gamma Ethniki Zakynthos was promoted to Beta Ethniki, being favoured by HFF's decision to increase the number of teams in the upper division, and the inability of a number of other clubs to support their participation to the upcoming Beta Ethniki season due to financial problems. This led to an increased number of teams from the 3rd division being promoted with Zakynthos being amidst them, as it was made official in July 2013.

Zakynthos made their first Beta Ethniki appearance playing in the Northern Group where they finished 9th, managing to avoid relegation with ease. The next season it was the most successful in the team's history as they managed to finish 5th in their group, their highest position ever.

In the 2015-16 season, Beta Ethniki merged again in one group of 18 clubs with Zakynthos taking part for 3rd straight season in the division. However, the club experienced financial problems and they faced the deduction of 3 points that proved to be costly in their relegation battle. They ended up finishing 15th, just one point away from safety and they returned to amateur divisions.

To this day, the 2nd tier of Greece is the highest level of football that APS Zakynthos has ever competed.

== Season to season ==
Season	Tier	Division	Place	Notes
1970–71	3	A΄ EPS Ilis	4th	
1971–72	3	A΄ EPS Ilis	2nd	
1972–73	3	A΄ EPS Ilis	1st	Champions, Qualified for the champions' championship, remained
1973–74	3	A΄ EPS Ilis	2nd	
1974–75	3	A΄ EPS Ilis	1st	Champions, Qualified for the champions' championship, remained
1975–76	3	A΄ EPS Ilis	2nd	
1976–77	3	A΄ EPS Ilis	2nd	Runners-up, Promoted
1977–78	3	Ethniki Erasitechniki	18th	Relegated, -2 pts
1978–79	4	A΄ EPS Ilis	1st	Champions, Promoted
1979–80	3	Ethniki Erasitechniki	6th	
1980–81	3	Ethniki Erasitechniki	18th	-12 points
1981–82	3	Ethniki Erasitechniki	14th	Relegated, -6 pts
1982–83	5	A΄ EPS Ilis	1st	1st in 2nd group, Promoted through play-offs against Xenofon Krestena
1983–84	4	Delta Ethniki	12th	Relegated
1984–85	5	A΄ EPS Ilis	1st	1st in 2nd group, Promoted through play-offs against Ethnikos Pyrgou
1985–86	4	Delta Ethniki	2nd	
1986–87	4	Delta Ethniki	7th	Relegated
1987–88	5	A΄ EPS Zakynthou	5th	
1988–89	5	A΄ EPS Zakynthou	2nd	
1989–90	5	A΄ EPS Zakynthou	1st	Champions, Promoted
1990–91	4	Delta Ethniki	14th	
1991–92	4	Delta Ethniki	17th	Relegated
1992–93	5	A΄ EPS Zakynthou	1st	Champions, Promoted
1993–94	4	Delta Ethniki	12th	Relegated
1994–95	5	A΄ EPS Zakynthou	1st	Champions, Promoted
1995–96	4	Delta Ethniki	15th	Relegated, -6 pts
1996–97	5	A΄ EPS Zakynthou	1st	Champions, Promoted

Season	Tier	Division	Place	Notes
1997–98	4	Delta Ethniki	4th	
1998–99	4	Delta Ethniki	3rd	
1999–2000	4	Delta Ethniki	9th	
2000–01	4	Delta Ethniki	6th	
2001–02	4	Delta Ethniki	9th	
2002–03	4	Delta Ethniki	6th	
2003–04	4	Delta Ethniki	7th	
2004–05	4	Delta Ethniki	3rd	
2005–06	4	Delta Ethniki	1st	Champions, Promoted
2006–07	3	Gamma Ethniki (South)	18th	Relegated
2007–08	4	Delta Ethniki	1st	Champions, Promoted
2008–09	3	Gamma Ethniki (North)	6th	
2009–10	3	Gamma Ethniki (South)	4th	
2010–11	3	Football League 2 (North)	13th	
2011–12	3	Football League 2 (South)	3rd	Promotion Play-Offs
2012–13	3	Football League 2 (North)	7th	Promoted
2013–14	2	Football League (South)	9th	
2014–15	2	Football League (North)	5th	Relegation Play-Offs
2015–16	2	Football League	15th	Relegated
2016–17	4	A΄ EPS Zakynthou	1st	Champions, Promoted
2017–18	3	Gamma Ethniki	9th	Relegated
2018–19	4	A΄ EPS Zakynthou	2nd	Promoted
2019–20	4	Gamma Ethniki	4th	
2020–21	4	Gamma Ethniki	1st	Promoted
2021–22	2	Super League Greece 2 (South)	17th	Relegated
2022–23	3	Gamma Ethniki	9th	
2023–24	3	Gamma Ethniki	4th	
2024–25	3	Gamma Ethniki	8th	
2025–26	3	Gamma Ethniki	2nd	Promoted
2026–27	2	Super League Greece 2		

== Players ==
=== Current squad ===
As of 5 October 2026

Note: Flags indicate national team as defined under FIFA eligibility rules; some limited exceptions apply. Players may hold more than one non-FIFA nationality.

No.	Pos.	Nation	Player
3	DF	GRE	Stavros Petavrakis
7	FW	ARG	Maximiliano Cuadra
8	MF	GRE	Nikolaos Lolis
9	FW	GRE	Argyris Marnezos
10	MF	ARG	Juan Neira (captain)
11	MF	GRE	Christos Kryparakos
13	GK	GRE	Ilias Gogakis
14	DF	GRE	Konstantinos Gyftomitros
17	DF	GRE	Gurjinder Singh
18	DF	GRE	Konstantinos Lazaridis
19	MF	ARG	Iván Silva
21	FW	GRE	Michalis Bastakos
22	DF	GRE	Apostolos Stikas

No.	Pos.	Nation	Player
24	GK	NGR	Adebayo Adeleye
26	MF	ALB	Ergys Kaçe
28	FW	GBS	João Mário
30	DF	POR	Miguel Rodrigues
31	MF	GRE	Paschalis Kassos
66	GK	GRE	Konstantinos Tsogas
68	MF	GRE	Konstantinos Panagiotoudis
70	MF	ENG	Kareem Ben-Kmayal
72	DF	GRE	Theofanis Roibas
77	MF	GRE	Dimitrios Ananiadis
80	FW	ESP	Dani Selma
85	DF	GRE	Panagiotis Tsitskas
99	FW	GRE	Pavlos Chatzidimitriou

== Honours ==
APS Zakynthos has traditionally been the strongest football club in the island of Zakynthos. They are the team with the most wins of the Zakynthos Local Championships' Top Division and domestic cup.

The club has also emerged as one of the best teams in the regions of the Ionian Islands and Western Greece during the last years, having won the title twice in their regional group in Delta Ethniki.

- Fourth Division

Winners (3): 2005–06, 2007–08, 2020–21

- Zakynthos Local Division

Winners (5) – record: 1987–88, 1989–90, 1993–94, 1996–97, 2016–17

- Zakynthos Local Cup

Winners (21) – record: 1987–88, 1988–89, 1989–90, 1990–91, 1991–92, 1992–93, 1993–94, 1994–95, 1995–96, 1996–97, 1997–98, 1998–99, 1999–2000, 2001–02, 2003–04, 2004–05, 2005–06, 2022–23, 2023–24, 2024–25, 2025–26

- Elis Local Division

Winners (5): 1972–73, 1974–75, 1978–79, 1982–83, 1984–85

- Elis Local Cup

Winners (2): 1972–73, 1976–77

== Notable players ==
- (Greece) Stelios Liveris
- (Greece) Stathis Karamalikis
- (Greece) Thanasis Dinas
- (Greece) Alexandros Apostolopoulos
- (Poland) Tomasz Moskal
- (Slovenia) Enes Rujović
- (Scotland) Ross McVey
