= Dani Selma =

Spanish footballer

Personal information
- Full name: Daniel Selma Mercader
- Date of birth: 1 March 2001 (age 25)
- Place of birth: L'Eliana, Spain
- Height: 1.86 m (6 ft 1 in)
- Position: Striker

Team information
- Current team: Zakynthos
- Number: 80

Youth career
- 2006–2010: Marítimo Cabañal
- 2010–2012: Alboraya
- 2012–2015: Levante
- 2015–2017: La Vall
- 2017–2018: San José
- 2018–2020: Alboraya

Senior career*
| Years | Team | Apps | (Gls) |
| 2020–2022 | Acero | 47 | (5) |
| 2022–2023 | Tenerife B | 26 | (9) |
| 2022–2024 | Tenerife | 5 | (0) |
| 2023–2024 | → San Fernando (loan) | 16 | (3) |
| 2024 | → Alcoyano (loan) | 17 | (2) |
| 2024–2025 | Amorebieta | 36 | (5) |
| 2025–2026 | Pontevedra | 12 | (1) |
| 2026 | Marbella | 20 | (1) |
| 2026– | Zakynthos | 1 | (0) |
- * Club domestic league appearances and goals as of 5 October 2026

Daniel "Dani" Selma Mercader (born 1 March 2001) is a Spanish footballer who plays as a striker for Super League Greece 2 club Zakynthos.

== Club career ==
Born in L'Eliana, Valencian Community, Selma represented UD Marítimo Cabañal, Alboraya UD (two stints), Levante UD, Club La Vall and CF San José as a youth. In 2020, after finishing his formation, he joined Tercera División side CD Acero.

On 28 January 2022, Selma signed for CD Tenerife and was assigned to the reserves in Tercera División RFEF. He made his first team debut on 10 December, coming on as a late substitute for Borja Garcés in a 2–2 Segunda División away draw against Villarreal CF B.

On 20 August 2023, Selma was loaned to Primera Federación side San Fernando CD for the 2023–24 season. The following 16 January, he moved to fellow league team CD Alcoyano also in a temporary deal.

On 24 July 2024, Selma signed for SD Amorebieta, recently relegated to division three.

On 7 January 2026, Selma joined Marbella until 30 June 2026.

On 29 September 2026, Selma signed for Super League Greece 2 club Zakynthos on a free transfer.
