= 2026 Cuiabá Esporte Clube season =

Cuiabá Esporte Clube
2026 season
- Manager: Eduardo Barros
- Stadium: Arena Pantanal
- Campeonato Brasileiro Série B: 14th
- Top goalscorer: League: Kauan Cristtyan (6); All: Kauan Cristtyan (6)

During the 2026 season, Cuiabá Esporte Clube competed in the Campeonato Brasileiro Série B, the Campeonato Mato-Grossense, and the Copa do Brasil.

== Transfers ==
=== In ===
Pos.	Player	Transferred from	Fee	Date	Source
DF	(Brazil) Marlon	(Brazil) América Mineiro	Free	5 January 2026	
FW	(Brazil) Hernandes Rodrigues	(South Korea) Daejeon Hana Citizen	Free	28 January 2026	
FW	(Brazil) Vinicius Peixoto	(Brazil) EC São Bernardo	Undisclosed	25 February 2026	
FW	(Brazil) Rodrigo Rodrigues	(Brazil) Mirassol	Loan	25 February 2026	
MF	(Brazil) Raul	(Brazil) Athletico Paranaense	Loan	1 March 2026	
FW	(Brazil) Jean Dias	(Brazil) Atlético Goianiense	Undisclosed	6 July 2026	
FW	(Brazil) Fábio Gomes	Unattached	Undisclosed	20 July 2026	

=== Out ===
Pos.	Player	Transferred to	Fee	Date	Source
FW	(Brazil) Hernandes Rodrigues	(Vietnam) Thể Công–Viettel FC	Undisclosed	1 August 2026	
DF	(Brazil) Marlon	(Brazil) Remo	Undisclosed	13 August 2026	

== Competitions ==
=== Overall record ===
Competition	First match	Last match	Starting round	Final position	Record							
Competition	First match	Last match	Starting round	Final position	Pld	W	D	L	GF	GA	GD	Win %
Campeonato Brasileiro Série B	21 March 2026	14 November 2026	Matchday 1	14th	38	11	14	13	34	33	+1	28.95
Campeonato Mato-Grossense					0	0	0	0	0	0	+0	—
Copa do Brasil	4 March 2026		Second round	Second round	1	0	1	0	1	1	+0	0.00
Total					39	11	15	13	35	34	+1	28.21

Source: Competitions

=== Campeonato Brasileiro Série B ===
Pos	Team	Pld	W	D	L	GF	GA	GD	Pts
12	Botafogo-SP	38	14	9	15	45	41	+4	51
13	Athletic	38	11	15	12	46	46	0	48
14	Cuiabá	38	11	14	13	34	33	+1	47
15	Náutico	38	12	10	16	41	51	−10	46
16	Ceará	38	11	11	16	39	48	−9	44

Source: CBF
Rules for classification: 1) points; 2) wins; 3) goal difference; 4) goals scored; 5) head-to-head results (only between 2 teams); 6) fewest red cards; 7) fewest yellow cards; 8) drawing of lots.

==== Matches ====
21 March 2026 1	Cuiabá	0–0	Sport
20:30 UTC−3

31 March 2026 2	Fortaleza	0–0	Cuiabá
19:00 UTC−3

4 April 2026 3	Cuiabá	0–2	Ceará
18:00 UTC−3

12 April 2026 4	Operário Ferroviário	0–0	Cuiabá
18:00 UTC−3

19 April 2026 5	Goiás	0–2	Cuiabá
18:00 UTC−3

22 April 2026 6	Cuiabá	1–1	Botafogo-SP
21:30 UTC−3

2 May 2026 7	Cuiabá	1–1	Criciúma
18:30 UTC−3

9 May 2026 8	Athletic	0–0	Cuiabá
18:00 UTC−3

16 May 2026 9	Cuiabá	0–0	Novorizontino
20:30 UTC−3

22 May 2026 10	Náutico	1–0	Cuiabá
19:00 UTC−3

31 May 2026 11	Cuiabá	2–0	CRB
20:30 UTC−3

9 June 2026 12	Ponte Preta	1–2	Cuiabá
19:00 UTC−3

14 June 2026 13	Cuiabá	1–0	Vila Nova
17:00 UTC−3

21 June 2026 14	Avaí	1–0	Cuiabá
11:00 UTC−3

25 June 2026 15	Cuiabá	2–2	Londrina
20:30 UTC−3

2 July 2026 16	Cuiabá	1–0	América Mineiro
20:00 UTC−3

12 July 2026 17	São Bernardo	2–2	Cuiabá
16:00 UTC−3

17 July 2026 18	Juventude	2–0	Cuiabá
19:00 UTC−3

23 July 2026 19	Cuiabá	0–1	Atlético Goianiense
20:30 UTC−3

27 July 2026 20	Sport	1–1	Cuiabá
19:30 UTC−3

9 August 2026 21	Cuiabá	1–1	Fortaleza
18:00 UTC−3

15 August 2026 22	Ceará	1–3	Cuiabá
16:00 UTC−3

19 August 2026 23	Cuiabá	1–0	Operário Ferroviário
20:30 UTC−3

22 August 2026 24	Cuiabá	1–1	Goiás
18:30 UTC−3

29 August 2026 25	Botafogo-SP	1–2	Cuiabá
18:30 UTC−3

4 September 2026 26	Criciúma	2–0	Cuiabá
19:30 UTC−3

8 September 2026 27	Cuiabá	3–0	Athletic
20:30 UTC−3

13 September 2026 28	Novorizontino	1–1	Cuiabá
18:30 UTC−3

21 September 2026 29	Cuiabá	3–0	Náutico
21:30 UTC−3

27 September 2026 30	CRB	3–0	Cuiabá
16:00 UTC−3

3 October 2026 31	Cuiabá	2–0	Ponte Preta
17:00 UTC−3

7 October 2026 32	Vila Nova	0–0	Cuiabá
20:30 UTC−3

11 October 2026 33	Cuiabá	0–1	Avaí
18:30 UTC−3

20 October 2026 34	Londrina	1–0	Cuiabá
19:30 UTC−3

26 October 2026 35	América Mineiro	1–0	Cuiabá
18:30 UTC−3

1 November 2026 36	Cuiabá	1–2	São Bernardo
17:30 UTC−3

7 November 2026 37	Cuiabá	1–2	Juventude
19:00 UTC−3

14 November 2026 38	Atlético Goianiense	1–0	Cuiabá
16:30 UTC−3

=== Copa do Brasil ===
4 March 2026 Second round	Santa Catarina	1–1 (5–4 p)	Cuiabá
20:00 UTC−3
