= A.E. Irakleio F.C. =

Greek football club

Irakleio
- Full name: Irakleio Athlitiki Enosi
- Founded: 1929; 97 years ago
- Ground: Municipal Stadium; Irakleio, Attica, Greece
- Capacity: 2,000
- Chairman: Theodoros Tserpes
- Manager: Nikolaos Kounadis
- League: Athens FCA First Division
- 2025–26: Athens FCA First Division (Group 2), 10th
- Website: http://www.fcirakleio.gr
Home colours	Away colours

Irakleio Athlitiki Enosi (Greek: Ηράκλειο Αθλητική Ένωση) is a Greek football club based in Irakleio, Attica.

== History ==
The club was founded in 1929. They played in the 2015–16 Gamma Ethniki.

== Honours ==
League

- Athens FCA First Division
  - Winners (1): 2014–15 (1st group)

Cup

- Athens FCA Cup
  - Runners up (1): 2013-14
