= APO Kanaris Nenita F.C. =

Greek football club

APO Kanaris Nenita
- Full name: Athlitikos Podosferiklos Omilos Kanaris Nenita
- Founded: 1958; 68 years ago
- Ground: Kallimasia Municipal Ground
- Capacity: 1,500
- Chairman: Panagiotis Vounousakis
- Manager: Dimosthenis Kavouras
- League: Chios FCA First Division
- 2025–26: Chios FCA First Division, 5th
- Website: http://kanarischios.gr/
Home colours	Away colours

APO Kanaris Nenita F.C. is a Greek football club, based in Nenita, Chios.

The club was founded in 1958. They played for the first time in Gamma Ethniki in the season 2015–16.

== Honors ==
=== Domestic Titles and honors ===
  - Chios FCA Champions: 10
    - 1981–82, 1983–84, 1985–86, 1995–96, 2005–06, 2012–13, 2014–15, 2016–17, 2017–18, 2018–19
  - Chios FCA Cup Winners: 3
    - 1987–88, 2009–10, 2022–23
