= A.E. Farkadona F.C. =

A.E. Farkadona
- Full name: Athlitiki Enosi Farkadona
- Founded: 1967; 59 years ago
- Ground: Municipal Farkadona Stadium "K.Theodorou - Ap.Oikonomoulas"
- Capacity: 3,500
- League: Trikala FCA Second Division
- 2025–26: Trikala FCA Second Division, 5th
- Website: http://www.aefarkadonas.gr

A.E. Farkadona F.C. (Greek: Α.Ε. Φαρκαδόνας) is a Greek football club, based in Farkadona, Trikala.

The club was founded in 1967. They played in Gamma Ethniki for the season 2015–16.

== Honours ==
=== Domestic Titles and honours ===
  - Trikala FCA Championship: 2
    - 2004–05, 2014–15
  - Thessaly FCA Cup: 3
    - 2006–07, 2008–09, 2015–16
