= Eleftherios Mertakas =

Cypriot footballer (born 1985)

Elefhterios Mertakas
Personal information
- Full name: Eleftherios Mertakas
- Date of birth: March 16, 1985 (age 41)
- Place of birth: Paralimni, Cyprus
- Height: 1.74 m (5 ft 9 in)
- Position: Defender

Team information
- Current team: Ayia Napa
- Number: 30

Youth career
- Enosis Neon Paralimni

Senior career*
Years	Team	Apps	(Gls)
2004–2012	Enosis Neon Paralimni	110	(2)
2012–2014	AEK Larnaca	36	(0)
2015–2016	Ayia Napa	36	(1)
2016–2018	Enosis Neon Paralimni	46	(2)
2019–	Ayia Napa	16	(0)

International career^{‡}
2013–2014	Cyprus	2	(0)
- * Club domestic league appearances and goals as of 31 May 2019 ‡ National team caps and goals as of 9 September 2014

Eleftherios Mertakas (Greek: Ελευθέριος Μέρτακας; born March 16, 1985, in Paralimni) is a Cypriot football, who plays for Ayia Napa as a defender.
