= Milton Mendes (footballer, born 1979) =

Portuguese footballer

Milton
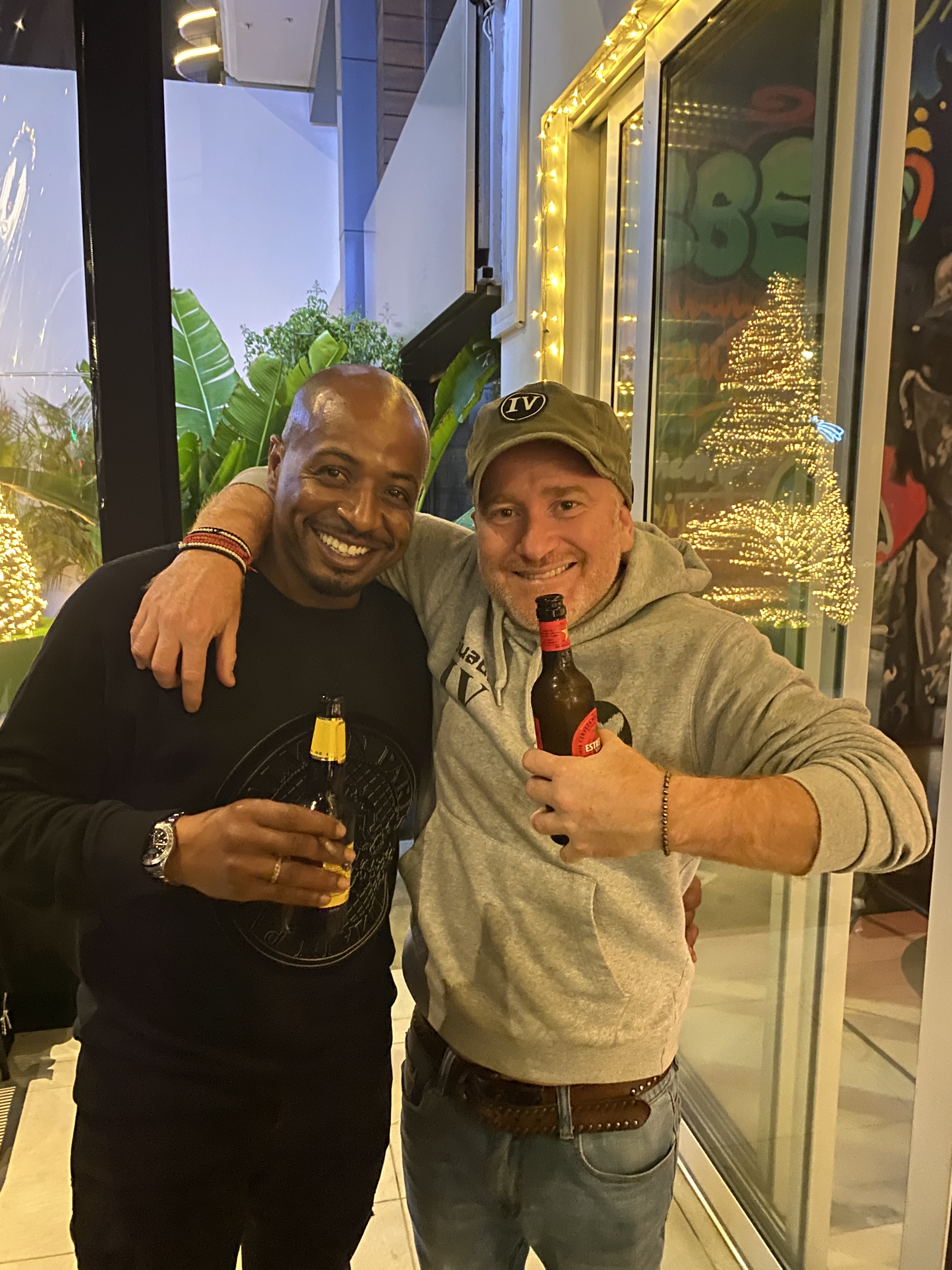

Personal information
- Full name: Milton Andrade Vaz Mendes
- Date of birth: 7 October 1979 (age 47)
- Place of birth: Amadora, Portugal
- Height: 1.75 m (5 ft 9 in)
- Position: Winger

Youth career
- 1990–1998: Norwich

Senior career*
Years	Team	Apps	(Gls)
1998–2001	Norwich	69	(33)
2001–2002	Tires		
2002–2003	Praiense		
2003–2004	Loures		
2004–2005	Barreirense	34	(10)
2005	Portomosense	2	(0)
2005–2006	Lixa	22	(3)
2006–2008	Freamunde	56	(5)
2008–2009	Doxa	36	(3)
2010	AEK Larnaca	12	(7)
2010–2011	Akritas Chlorakas	23	(8)
2011	PAEEK	14	(3)
2012	Doxa	15	(3)
2012–2013	Othellos Athienou	6	(1)
2013–2014	Elpida	24	(10)
2014–2015	Villeparisis		
2015–2016	Amathus	24	(7)
2016–2017	ENY Digenis Ypsona	21	(5)
- * Club domestic league appearances and goals as of 7 April 2019

Milton Andrade Vaz Mendes (born 7 October 1979 in Amadora, Lisbon), known simply as Milton, is a Portuguese footballer who plays as a winger.
