= Constantinos Mintikkis =

Cypriot footballer (born 1989)

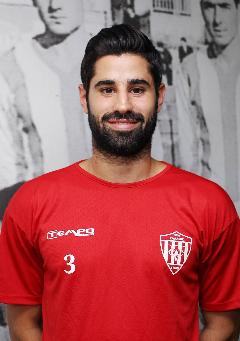

Personal information
- Full name: Constantinos Mintikkis
- Date of birth: July 14, 1989 (age 37)
- Place of birth: Nicosia, Cyprus
- Height: 1.76 m (5 ft 9 1/2 in)
- Positions: Winger; full back

Youth career
- Anorthosis Famagusta

Senior career*
Years	Team	Apps	(Gls)
2006–2011	Anorthosis Famagusta	3	(0)
2007–2008	→ Digenis Morphou (loan)	12	(2)
2008–2009	→ ENTHOI Lakatamia (loan)	22	(5)
2009–2010	→ AEK Larnaca (loan)	21	(4)
2010–2011	→ ASIL (loan)	24	(3)
2011–2012	→ Ethnikos Assia (loan)	7	(1)
2012–2013	Omonia Aradippou	20	(10)
2013–2015	Nea Salamina	42	(0)
2015–2018	AEK Larnaca	26	(0)
2017–2018	→ Nea Salamina (loan)	26	(2)
2018–2019	Nea Salamina	22	(2)
2019–2021	Doxa Katokopias	37	(0)
2021–2022	APOEL	0	(0)

International career^{‡}
- Cyprus U21
2014–	Cyprus	1	(0)
- * Club domestic league appearances and goals as of 00:54, 7 June 2021 (UTC) ‡ National team caps and goals as of 6 September 2019

Constantinos Mintikkis (Greek: Κωνσταντίνος Μιντίκκης; born 14 July 1989) is a former Cypriot footballer.

== International ==
On 15 November 2014, he had his first called in Cyprus national football team for the UEFA Euro 2016 qualifying match against Andorra on 16 November 2014. He was on bench.

He made his international debut on 6 September 2019 in a 2020 Euro qualifier against Kazakhstan, as a starter.
