= Hugo Soares (Portuguese footballer) =

Portuguese footballer

Personal information
- Full name: Hugo Henrique Rocha Soares
- Date of birth: 16 October 1982 (age 44)
- Place of birth: Miragaia, Portugal
- Height: 1.78 m (5 ft 10 in)
- Position: Midfielder

Youth career
- 1995–1996: Paivense
- 1996–2001: Porto

Senior career*
Years	Team	Apps	(Gls)
2001–2002	Porto B	27	(0)
2003–2004	Sanjoanense	36	(3)
2004–2005	Ribeira Brava	38	(1)
2005–2006	Madalena	26	(0)
2006–2007	Espinho	18	(0)
2007–2008	Gondomar	24	(0)
2008–2009	Moreirense	32	(0)
2009–2011	Penafiel	49	(0)
2011–2012	Anagennisi	22	(2)
2012–2013	Ayia Napa	23	(0)
2013–2014	Ethnikos Achna	17	(0)
2014–2016	Cinfães	39	(0)
2016–2020	Paivense	102	(1)
2021–2023	Nespereira	41	(0)
- * Club domestic league appearances and goals as of 15:06, 26 December 2023 (UTC)

Hugo Henrique Rocha Soares (born 16 October 1982) is a Portuguese former professional footballer who played as a midfielder.
