= Chicago Inferno =

Chicago Inferno Soccer Club
- Full name: The Chicago Inferno Soccer Club
- Founded: 2009
- Ground: Crystal Lake (Illinois)
- Club DOC: Ewerton Andrade
- Website: http://www.chicagoinferno.net

The Chicago Inferno is an American soccer club based in Crystal Lake, Illinois, United States. The team originally played from 2012 to 2014 in the USL Premier Development League, the fourth division of the American soccer pyramid, in the Heartland Division of the Central Conference. In 2015 Chicago Inferno - Crystal Lake was launched as a branch and continues to operate today serving both youth and high school level competitive teams.

== History ==
The Chicago Inferno was founded in 2009 to compete in the National Soccer League of Chicago. In 2011, the club joined the Great Lakes Division of the USL Premier Development League (PDL), one of the top amateur leagues in the country alongside the National Premier Soccer League (NPSL), and considered the fourth tier of the American soccer pyramid.
