= Petros Filaniotis =

Cypriot footballer (born 1980)

Petros Philaniotis
Personal information
- Full name: Petros Philaniotis
- Date of birth: April 13, 1980 (age 46)
- Place of birth: Nicosia, Cyprus
- Height: 1.73 m (5 ft 8 in)
- Position: Midfielder

Youth career
- PAEEK FC

Senior career*
| Years | Team | Apps | (Gls) |
| 2001–2003 | PAEEK | 0 | (0) |
| 2003–2009 | AEL Limassol | 115 | (22) |
| 2009–2012 | Ethnikos Achna | 65 | (7) |
| 2012–2013 | Omonia Aradippou | 25 | (7) |
| 2013–2014 | Digenis Akritas Morphou | 18 | (9) |
| 2014–2016 | ENTHOI Lakatamia | 36 | (7) |

International career^{‡}
| 2005 | Cyprus | 4 | (0) |
- * Club domestic league appearances and goals as of 7 November 2015 ‡ National team caps and goals as of July 2009

Petros Philaniotis (Greek: Πέτρος Φιλανιώτης; born April 13, 1980, in Nicosia, Cyprus) is a retired Cypriot international football who played as an attacking midfielder. AEL FC signed him from PAEEK FC. In January 2009 he moved to Ethnikos Achna FC for 3 years where he enjoyed a fruitful spell with 2 goals in his first two games and several assists.
