= Costas Markou =

Cypriot footballer (born 1988)

Personal information
- Full name: Constantinos Markou
- Date of birth: March 27, 1988 (age 38)
- Place of birth: Limassol, Cyprus
- Height: 1.68 m (5 ft 6 in)
- Position: Midfielder

Team information
- Current team: Ayia Napa
- Number: 30

Senior career*
Years	Team	Apps	(Gls)
2006–2012	Aris Limassol	112	(8)
2012–2013	Nikos & Sokratis Erimis	24	(9)
2013–	Ayia Napa	27	(6)
- * Club domestic league appearances and goals as of 21:23, 31 October 2015 (UTC)

Constantinos Markou (Greek: Κωνσταντίνος Μάρκου; born 27 March 1988 in Limassol) is a Cypriot footballer who plays for Ayia Napa.
