= Nuno Gomes (footballer, born 1978) =

Portuguese footballer

- Gomes in 2025

Personal information
- Full name: Nuno Miguel Gomes Bentes Lampreia
- Date of birth: 27 September 1978 (age 48)
- Place of birth: Lisbon, Portugal
- Height: 1.80 m (5 ft 11 in)
- Position: Defender

Team information
- Current team: Serbia (assistant)

Youth career
- 1990–1991: Beira-Mar Almada
- 1991–1996: Sporting CP

Senior career*
Years	Team	Apps	(Gls)
1996–1999	Lourinhanense	42	(0)
1999–2000	Felgueiras	46	(11)
2001–2002	Campomaiorense	44	(2)
2002–2004	Chaves	32	(3)
2004–2009	Varzim	103	(11)
2009–2010	União Leiria	0	(0)
2010–2011	Covilhã	17	(0)
2011–2012	Akritas Chlorakas	25	(1)
2012–2013	AEK Kouklia	27	(5)
Total		336	(33)

Managerial career
- 2016–2017: Othellos Athienou (assistant)
- 2017–2018: Cova Piedade (assistant)
- 2018: Chicago Fire (assistant)
- 2018–2019: Chaves (assistant)
- 2019–2020: Estoril (assistant)
- 2020–2022: Reading (assistant)
- 2023: Guadalajara (assistant)
- 2024–2025: Tigres UANL (assistant)
- 2025: Oviedo (assistant)
- 2025–: Serbia (assistant)
- * Club domestic league appearances and goals

Nuno Miguel Gomes Bentes Lampreia (born 27 September 1978) is a Portuguese former professional footballer who played as a defender. He is currently assistant manager of the Serbia national team.

He amassed Segunda Liga totals of 230 games and 27 goals over 11 seasons, mainly with Varzim.

== Playing career ==
Gomes was born in Lisbon. An unsuccessful youth graduate from Sporting CP's famed youth system, he made his professional debut with F.C. Felgueiras, moving in January 2001 to S.C. Campomaiorense in what would be his first Primeira Liga experience, with relegation.

Gomes then returned to the Segunda Liga where he remained seven seasons, with G.D. Chaves (two years) and Varzim SC. At the end of 2008–09, in which he scored seven league goals for the latter side, he signed with U.D. Leiria who had recently returned to the top division.

Having made no competitive appearances for Leiria in the 2009–10 campaign, Gomes was released and joined second-tier club S.C. Covilhã. He retired at the age of 35, after two years in the Cypriot Second Division with as many teams.

Gomes was part of the Portuguese squad that won the 1995 UEFA European Under-16 Championship in Belgium.

== Coaching career ==
Gomes began working as a youth manager in Cyprus, returning to Portugal in 2017 to take charge of C.D. Cova da Piedade's under-17 squad. The following year, he joined Chicago Fire FC as an assistant, later revealing that he got the job through his friend and former Varzim teammate Aleksandar Sarić, who worked at the American club as goalkeeper coach.

In December 2018, Gomes was appointed assistant manager at Chaves. On 8 September 2020, in the same capacity, he moved to Reading of the EFL Championship as part of Veljko Paunović's staff.

Gomes subsequently continued to work under Paunović, now in the Mexican Liga MX at C.D. Guadalajara and Tigres UANL. In March 2025, the pair moved to the Spanish Segunda División with Real Oviedo, acheving promotion to La Liga.

In October 2025, Gomes joined Paunović's staff at the Serbia national team.
