= Guillaume Brenner =

Footballer (born 1986)

Personal information
- Full name: Guillaume Walter Brenner
- Date of birth: 10 February 1986 (age 40)
- Place of birth: Beauvais, France
- Height: 1.75 m (5 ft 9 in)
- Position: Midfielder

Youth career
- 2000–2001: US Chantilly
- 2001–2004: Nantes

Senior career*
| Years | Team | Apps | (Gls) |
| 2004–2005 | Nantes B | 1 | (0) |
| 2005–2007 | Louhans-Cuiseaux | 11 | (0) |
| 2007–2008 | Czarni Żagań | 1 | (0) |
| 2008–2009 | Olympique Noisy-le-Sec | 14 | (1) |
| 2009–2011 | Alki Larnaca | 21 | (2) |
| 2013–2014 | GS Saint-Sébastien | | |

International career
| 2006–2012 | Togo | 8 | (0) |
- * Club domestic league appearances and goals

Guillaume Walter Brenner (born 10 February 1986) is a former professional footballer who played as a midfielder. Born in France, he represented Togo at international level.

== Personal life ==
Brenner was born in Beauvais, France. He holds both French and Togolese nationalities.

== Club career ==
He began his career with US Chantilly and joined the academy of FC Nantes one year later, playing there in the youth teams for four years. Additionally, he played one game for the reserve team and signed in July 2005 with CS Louhans-Cuiseaux. Brenner played 11 games for Louhans-Cuiseaux in the Championnat National. He signed a contract in January 2008 with Polish II liga club Czarni Żagań. After one year in Poland, Brenner went back to France in December 2008 and signed for Olympique Noisy-le-Sec in the Championnat de France amateur. He left the club after a half year, in summer 2009, to join Cypriot club Alki Larnaca of the Cypriot First Division.

== International career ==
He debuted for the Togo national team in 2006 and has eight international caps.
