= Jorge Troiteiro =

Spanish footballer

Personal information
- Full name: Jorge Troiteiro Carrasco
- Date of birth: 9 April 1984 (age 42)
- Place of birth: Almansa, Spain
- Height: 1.64 m (5 ft 5 in)
- Position: Midfielder

Youth career
- –1996: CP Mérida
- 1996–2001: Barcelona
- 2001–2003: Atlético Madrid

Senior career*
Years	Team	Apps	(Gls)
2003	Atlético Madrid C	2	(0)
2003–2006	Mérida UD	82	(10)
2006–2007	Linares	15	(1)
2007–2008	Melilla	32	(5)
2008–2009	Lucena	41	(3)
2010	Villanovense	19	(1)
2010–2011	Extremadura	20	(1)
2011–2012	Burgos	30	(2)
2012–2013	Doxa	31	(4)
2013–2016	Mérida AD	79	(12)
2016–2017	Enosis Neon	24	(5)
2017	Hospitalet	2	(0)
2017–2018	Azuaga	20	(3)
2018–2019	Olivenza	36	(2)
2019–2021	Calamonte	？	(？)
2021–2023	CD Nueva Ciudad	？	(？)
2023–2024	Racing Mérida	？	(？)
- * Club domestic league appearances and goals as of 8 March 2020

Jorge Troiteiro Carrasco (born 9 April 1984) is a Spanish former footballer who played as an attacking midfielder.

== Football career ==
Born in Almansa, Albacete, Castile-La Mancha, to fellow footballer Luis, Troiteiro emigrated at the age of two months to Mérida, Extremadura. Representing CP Mérida, he caught the eye of FC Barcelona at the age of 12 and attended the La Masia academy for five years, where he bunked with fellow Manchego Andrés Iniesta.

Already having a release clause of 350 million pesetas, Troiteiro left Barcelona for Atlético Madrid, making his senior debut in a couple of matches for the latter's C-team in Tercera División. At the end of his 18-month spell, he went back to his adopted home and joined Mérida UD in 2003. He never played any higher than Segunda División B, where he made 223 appearances and scored 21 goals for eight clubs, suffering four relegations including three in consecutive seasons. Abroad, he played for Doxa Katokopias FC and Enosis Neon Paralimni FC in Cyprus; the former was his career's only professional output, in the 2012–13 First Division.
