= A.O. Levante F.C. =

Greek football club

A.O. Levante
- Full name: Athlitikos Omilos Levante; Αθλητικός Όμιλος Λεβάντε
- Founded: 5 May 1991; 35 years ago
- Ground: Machairado Municipal Stadium
- Capacity: 300
- Chairman: Dionysios Kalandrias
- Manager: Christos Gerolymatos
- League: Gamma Ethniki
- 2025–26: Zakynthos FCA First Division, 2nd (promoted)
- Website: https://ao-levante.blogspot.com/

Athlitikos Omilos Levante is a Greek association football club representing Agioi Pantes and Galaro on the island of Zakynthos. Founded on 5 May 1991, the club competes in the Gamma Ethniki, the third tier of the Greek football league system. It returned to national competition for the 2026–27 season and was assigned to Group 6.

== History ==
Levante was founded on 5 May 1991 and represents the villages of Agioi Pantes and Galaro. The club lists red and blue as its official colours.

In 2014–15, Levante won the Zakynthos FCA First Division for the first time and also won the association cup, completing a local double.

The club qualified for the Gamma Ethniki through the 2015 promotion play-offs and made its debut in the national competition in 2015–16. It finished twelfth in Group 3 and was relegated after one season.

Levante won its second Zakynthos FCA First Division championship in 2022–23.

In 2024–25, the club finished as runner-up behind Thyella Ampelokipon. The championship was decided after Levante drew 1–1 with A.O. Katastariou on the fifth matchday of the play-offs.

Levante again finished second in 2025–26, behind champions Thyella Ampelokipon. After Thyella did not enter the Gamma Ethniki, the Zakynthos Football Clubs Association invited the runner-up to take its place. Levante accepted the invitation and was subsequently placed in Group 6 for the 2026–27 season.

== Ground ==
For the 2026–27 season, the Hellenic Football Federation's official fixture list designates Machairado Municipal Ground as the venue for Levante's home matches.

== Colours and crest ==
The club's official colours are red and blue. Its crest includes red-and-blue stripes, the map of Zakynthos, and a bat, and local sports media commonly refer to the team as “the Bats”. The club shares colours and crest with namesake Spanish club Levante UD, which uses the bat as it is associated with its hometown, Valencia. Valencia CF also carries the same bat.

== Honours ==
- Zakynthos FCA First Division
  - Winners (2): 2014–15, 2022–23
  - Runners-up (2): 2024–25, 2025–26
- Zakynthos FCA Cup
  - Winners (1): 2014–15
