= A.O. Katastari F.C. =

Greek football club

A.O. Katastari
- Full name: Athlitikos Omilos Katastari
- Founded: 1990; 36 years ago
- Ground: Romyri Municipal Ground
- Chairman: Spyros Patrinos
- Manager: Spyros Marinos
- League: Zakynthos FCA First Division
- 2025–26: Zakynthos FCA First Division, 6th
- Website: http://www.zantefc.gr/

A.O. Katastari Football Club is a Greek football club, based in Katastari, Zakynthos, Greece.

== Honours ==
- Zakynthos FCA
  - Champions 2007–08, 2017–18
  - Cup winners 2008–09, 2015–16, 2016–17
