= Ibraima Baldé =

Guinea-Bissauan footballer (born 1986)

Personal information
- Full name: Ibraima Fali Baldé
- Date of birth: 15 January 1986 (age 40)
- Place of birth: Bissau, Guinea-Bissau
- Height: 1.81 m (5 ft 11 in)
- Position: Striker

Youth career
- 1999–2004: Estrela Amadora

Senior career*
| Years | Team | Apps | (Gls) |
| 2004 | Estrela Amadora | 5 | (1) |
| 2004 | Tourizense | 10 | (0) |
| 2005 | Ribeira Brava | 10 | (1) |
| 2005–2006 | Torreense | 23 | (9) |
| 2006–2008 | Odivelas | 35 | (11) |
| 2008 | Ştiinţa | 7 | (3) |
| 2009 | Beira-Mar | 7 | (1) |
| 2009–2010 | Politehnica Iaşi | 10 | (1) |
| 2011 | Vizela | 8 | (2) |
| 2012–2013 | Oriental | 11 | (0) |
| 2013 | Marítimo Graciosa | 9 | (3) |
| 2015–2016 | Atlético Cacém | 0 | (0) |

International career
| 2007 | Guinea-Bissau | 1 | (0) |
- * Club domestic league appearances and goals

Ibraima Fali Baldé (born 15 January 1986 in Bissau) is a Guinea-Bissauan footballer who plays as a striker.
