= Zakynthiakos F.C. =

Zakynthiakos
- Full name: Athlitikos Omilos Podosfairou Zakynthiakos
- Ground: Zakynthos Municipal Stadium
- Capacity: 1,000
- Chairman: Koronios Dionysios
- Manager: Karypidis Savvas
- League: Gamma Ethniki (Group 3)
- 2014-15: Gamma Ethniki (Group 3)4th

Zakynthiakos Football Club is a Greek football club based in Zakynthos, Greece.

== Players ==
=== Current squad ===
Note: Flags indicate national team as defined under FIFA eligibility rules; some limited exceptions apply. Players may hold more than one non-FIFA nationality.

No.	Pos.	Nation	Player
—	GK	GRE	Diamantis Leandros
—	GK	GRE	Kladis Dionysios
—	DF	BUL	Atanas Pashkulev
—	DF	GRE	Kokas Lampros
—	DF	GRE	Solomos Nikolaos
—	DF	GRE	Nikou Asterios
—	DF	GRE	Botonis Georgios
—	DF	GRE	Kolovakis Ioannis
—	DF	GRE	Tziaferis Athanasios
—	DF	GRE	Theodosis Theodoros
—	DF	GRE	Kitos Stavros
—	MF	GRE	Kostakis Marios

No.	Pos.	Nation	Player
—	MF	GRE	Stelios Liveris
—	MF	GRE	Velianitis Ioannis
—	MF	GRE	Mallias Charis
—	MF	ALB	Pagia Tsakos
—	MF	ALB	Claydee Tsalekou
—	MF	GRE	Kalogeris Nikolaos
—	MF	GRE	Sourpis Stylianos
—	MF	GRE	Pettas Rafail
—	MF	GRE	Kolla Orestis
—	FW	GRE	Karamalikis Efstathios
—	FW	GRE	Fotiadis Pavlos
—	FW	GRE	Barbarousis Georgios

== Honours ==
=== Domestic Titles and honours ===
  - Zakynthos FCA Championship: 2
    - 2013–14, 2016–17
  - Zakynthos FCA Cup: 1
    - 2013–14
