= List of Cypriot football transfers summer 2008 =

This is a list of Cypriot football transfers for the 2008–09 summer transfer window by club. Only transfers of clubs in the Cypriot First Division are included.

The summer transfer window opened on 1 June 2008, although a few transfers took place prior to that date. The window closed at midnight on 31 August 2008. Players without a club may join one at any time, either during or in between transfer windows.

== Marfin Laiki League ==
=== AEK Larnaca ===
In: Note: Flags indicate national team as defined under FIFA eligibility rules; some limited exceptions apply. Players may hold more than one non-FIFA nationality.

No.	Pos.	Nation	Player
—	GK	CMR	Joslain Mayebi (from (France) FC Metz)
—	DF	BRA	Marcelo (from CA Metropolitano)
—	FW	ARG	Omar Monesterolo (from (Malta) Valletta FC)
—	DF	CYP	Demetris Daskalakis (from APOEL)
—	MF	BRA	Magno Mocelin (from Omonia)
—	FW	NGR	Joseph Nwafor (from (Greece) OFI)
—	MF	ISR	Erez Mesika (from (Israel) Maccabi Tel Aviv)
—	GK	BUL	Ivaylo Petrov (from (Bulgaria) CSKA Sofia)
—	MF	ARG	Alejandro Gavatorta (from (Switzerland) FC Thun)
—	GK	CZE	Jiří Bobok (from (Czech Republic) FK Jablonec)
—	FW	GBS	Dionisio Mendes (from (Tunisia) Stade Tunisien)
—	MF	GBS	Ednilson (from (Serbia) Partizan Belgrade)
—	MF	CZE	Martin Abraham (from (Czech Republic) Slavia Praha)

Out: Note: Flags indicate national team as defined under FIFA eligibility rules; some limited exceptions apply. Players may hold more than one non-FIFA nationality.

No.	Pos.	Nation	Player
4	DF	CYP	Paraskevas Christou (to APOEL)
33	GK	CYP	Sofronis Avgousti (loan return to Apollon Limassol)
89	FW	POR	João Paiva (to (Switzerland) FC Luzern)
10	FW	CYP	Marios Neophytou (to Nea Salamina)
16	MF	BIH	Esad Razić (to Alki Larnaca)
19	DF	BRA	Tininho (released)
1	GK	SVK	Peter Hodulík (released)
3	DF	VEN	José Manuel Rey (to (Venezuela) Caracas FC)
39	FW	NGR	Sunny Ekeh Kingsley (to (Ukraine) Metalurg Donetsk)
—	FW	ARG	Omar Monesterolo (to (Israel) Hapoel Bnei Lod)
—	MF	ARG	Alejandro Gavatorta (to (Romania) Politehnica Iaşi)

=== AEL Limassol ===
In: Note: Flags indicate national team as defined under FIFA eligibility rules; some limited exceptions apply. Players may hold more than one non-FIFA nationality.

No.	Pos.	Nation	Player
—	FW	ROU	Adrian Mihalcea (from Aris Limassol)
—	DF	POR	Júnior (from Doxa Katokopia)
—	DF	ROU	Adrian Iordache (from Alki Larnaca)
—	DF	FRA	Edwin Ouon (from Aris Limassol)
—	FW	SRB	Nemanja Čorović (loan return from APOEL)
—	MF	CYP	Marios Louka (from APOEL)
—	MF	SEN	Cheikh Gadiaga (from Alki Larnaca)
—	MF	POR	Pedro Miguel Torrao (from Nea Salamina)
—	DF	CYP	Loizos Kakoyiannis (from Omonia)
—	GK	CMR	Pierre Ebede (from (France) FC Metz)
—	GK	CYP	Demetris Stylianou (from Olympiakos Nicosia)
—	MF	PER	Julio García (from (Peru) Cienciano del Cuzco)
—	FW	ARG	Silvio González (from Olympiakos Nicosia)
—	FW	GHA	Peter Oforiquaye (from (Israel) Kiryat Shmona)
—	DF	FRA	Jérémie Rodrigues (from (France) US Boulogne)

Out: Note: Flags indicate national team as defined under FIFA eligibility rules; some limited exceptions apply. Players may hold more than one non-FIFA nationality.

No.	Pos.	Nation	Player
—	DF	SRB	Predrag Ocokoljić (to Anorthosis)
—	MF	POR	Tiquinho (to Anorthosis)
—	DF	CYP	Giannis Sampson (to AEP Paphos)
—	DF	SRB	Aleksandar Todorovski ( (Serbia) FK Rad)
—	DF	POR	Zé Nando (to (Portugal) F.C. Penafiel)
—	FW	GHA	Moses Sakyi (to (Portugal) S.C. Olhanense)
—	FW	POR	Filipe Azevedo (released)
—	DF	POR	Daniel Carriço (Loan return to (Portugal) Sporting CP)
—	FW	SEN	Seyni N'Diaye (retired)
—	MF	CRO	Igor Musa (to (Croatia) Zrinjski Mostar)
—	DF	MTN	Moise Kandé (on loan to PAEEK FC)
—	FW	CYP	Nicolas Vitorović (to Chalkanoras Idaliou)

=== AEP Paphos ===
In: Note: Flags indicate national team as defined under FIFA eligibility rules; some limited exceptions apply. Players may hold more than one non-FIFA nationality.

No.	Pos.	Nation	Player
—	DF	SLO	Almir Tanjič (from Enosis Neon Paralimni)
—	DF	POR	Hugo Coelho (from Olympiakos Nicosia)
—	MF	BRA	Leonardo de Oliveira (from Olympiakos Nicosia)
—	DF	CYP	Giannis Sampson (from AEL Limassol)
—	DF	GER	Marco Förster (from (Greece) AEL])
—	MF	SEN	Ismail Ba (from Omonia)
—	GK	NED	Joost Terol (from (Greece) Veria)
—	MF	BRA	André Caldeira (from (Israel) Maccabi Petah Tikva)
—	MF	POR	José António Calado (from APOP Kinyras Peyias)
—	DF	GHA	Imoro Lukman (from (Israel) Bnei Yehuda)
—	FW	CYP	Kyriacos Chailis (from Omonia)
—	GK	CYP	Demetris Leoni (from Omonia)
—	FW	SRB	Milan Belić (from Anorthosis)
—	MF	GAM	Jatto Ceesay (from (Netherlands) FC Omniworld)
—	DF	BRA	Tinga (from APOP Kinyras Peyias)
—	FW	NED	Ronny Van Es (from (Greece) Panthrakikos)
—	MF	CYP	Giorgos Vasiliou (from Aris Limassol)

Out: Note: Flags indicate national team as defined under FIFA eligibility rules; some limited exceptions apply. Players may hold more than one non-FIFA nationality.

No.	Pos.	Nation	Player
—	FW	POR	José Chevela (to Olympiakos Nicosia)
—	MF	POR	Ricardo Nunes (to Aris Limassol)
—	MF	SLO	Spasoje Bulajič (to (Slovenia) NK Celje)
—	DF	CYP	Charalambos Charalambous (to Atromitos Yeroskipou)
—	FW	GRE	Petros Dimitriadis (released)
—	GK	GRE	Angelos Georgiou (to Nea Salamina)
—	MF	BUL	Hristo Telkiyski (released)
—	DF	CYP	Lakis Nikita (to Akritas Chloraka)

=== Alki Larnaca ===
In: Note: Flags indicate national team as defined under FIFA eligibility rules; some limited exceptions apply. Players may hold more than one non-FIFA nationality.

No.	Pos.	Nation	Player
—	MF	NGR	Lewis Aniweta (from Doxa Katokopias)
—	MF	POR	Hugo Machado (from Olympiakos Nicosia)
—	MF	POR	Rui Dolores (from Nea Salamina)
—	FW	BRA	Gabriel Lima (from APOP Kinyras Peyias)
—	FW	CYP	Costas Elia (from Enosis Neon Paralimni)
—	MF	IRI	Ferydoon Zandi (from Olympiakos Nicosia)
—	DF	CYP	Loukas Louka (from Anorthosis)
—	MF	ROU	Bogdan Andone (from Apollon Limassol)
—	GK	ALB	Isli Hidi (from (Ukraine) Kryvbas Kryvyi Rih)
—	DF	ALB	Blerim Rrustemi (from (Germany) Rot-Weiß Erfurt)
—	MF	POR	Rui Andrade (from Doxa Katokopias)
—	FW	CYP	Elias Vattis (from Omonia)
—	MF	SRB	Petar Đenić (from Olympiakos Nicosia)
—	MF	SEN	Lamine Sakho (from (France) Montpellier HSC)
—	FW	POR	Edgar (from (Portugal) Boavista)
—	FW	GUI	Kaba Diawara (from (Turkey) Ankaragücü)

Out: Note: Flags indicate national team as defined under FIFA eligibility rules; some limited exceptions apply. Players may hold more than one non-FIFA nationality.

No.	Pos.	Nation	Player
—	GK	HUN	Ádám Vezér (to Ethnikos Assia)
—	DF	CHI	Alex Von Schwedler (to (Portugal) Belenenses)
—	MF	BRA	Jocivalter Liberato (to Atromitos Yeroskipou)
—	FW	BRA	Clayton (to Omonia)
—	MF	CYP	Antonis Panagi (to Olympiakos Nicosia)
—	MF	CYP	Kyriakos Apostolou (to Ayia Napa FC)
—	DF	ROU	Adrian Iordache (to AEL Limassol)
—	MF	SEN	Cheikh Gadiaga (to AEL Limassol)
—	MF	ANG	Carlos Chaínho (retired)
—	FW	SRB	Dragan Isailović (to Ermis Aradippou)
—	GK	GRE	Nikos Kouvarakis (to Ermis Aradippou)
—	FW	ARG	Diego Rivarola (to (Chile) Santiago Morning)
—	DF	URU	Carlos García (Released)
—	FW	URU	Julio Rodríguez (to (Chile) Antofagasta)
—	MF	POR	Mário Carlos (to Ermis Aradippou)
—	FW	BRA	Alessandro Soares (to Ermis Aradippou)
—	MF	POR	Rui Dolores (to (Portugal) Beira-Mar)
—	DF	CYP	Michalis Markou (on loan to Ermis Aradippou)
—	MF	POR	Rui Andrade (on loan to Ermis Aradippou)
—	MF	BRA	Renato (to AO Ayia Napa)

=== Anorthosis Famagusta ===
In: Note: Flags indicate national team as defined under FIFA eligibility rules; some limited exceptions apply. Players may hold more than one non-FIFA nationality.

No.	Pos.	Nation	Player
—	DF	SRB	Predrag Ocokoljić (from AEL Limassol)
—	MF	GRE	Giannis Skopelitis (from (Greece) Atromitos)
—	MF	CYP	Stefanos Voskaridis (from (Greece) Kallithea)
—	MF	POR	Tiquinho (from AEL Limassol)
—	MF	MNE	Siniša Dobrašinović (from Omonia)
—	DF	CYP	Giorgos Theodotou (from Omonia)
—	DF	GRE	Georgios Georgiou (from (Portugal) Atromitos)
—	DF	NED	Jeffrey Leiwakabessy (from (Germany) Alemannia Aachen)
—	MF	FRA	Cédric Bardon (from (Israel) Bnei Yehuda)
—	DF	GRE	Traianos Dellas (from (Greece) AEK Athens)
—	MF	BRA	Sávio (from (Brazil) Desportiva Capixaba)
—	MF	IRQ	Hawar Mulla Mohammed (from (Qatar) Al-Khor)

Out: Note: Flags indicate national team as defined under FIFA eligibility rules; some limited exceptions apply. Players may hold more than one non-FIFA nationality.

No.	Pos.	Nation	Player
—	DF	GRE	Savvas Poursaitidis (to APOEL)
—	MF	SLO	Anton Žlogar (to Omonia)
—	DF	RWA	Hamad Ndikumana (to Omonia)
—	DF	EGY	Amir Megahed (to (Turkey) Hacettepe SK)
—	MF	BRA	William Boaventura (to (Ukraine) Metallurg Donetsk)
—	DF	CYP	Loukas Louka (to Alki Larnaca)
—	MF	BUL	Metodi Deyanov (released)
—	FW	SRB	Milan Belić (to AEP Paphos)
—	DF	GRE	Theodoros Tripotseris (to (Greece) Levadiakos)

=== APEP Pitsilia ===
In: Note: Flags indicate national team as defined under FIFA eligibility rules; some limited exceptions apply. Players may hold more than one non-FIFA nationality.

No.	Pos.	Nation	Player
—	FW	BRA	Gelson (from (Switzerland) FC Locarno)
—	FW	NGR	David Opara (unknown)
—	DF	HUN	Gábor Nagy (from (Switzerland) FC Aarau)
—	GK	CYP	Charalambos Kairinos (from Nea Salamina)
—	FW	BRA	Paulo Vogt (on loan from (Ukraine) Metalurh Donetsk)
—	FW	TUN	Salema Kasdaoui (from (Tunisia) Espérance Tunis)
—	MF	TUN	Sami Gtari (from (Tunisia) Stade Tunisien)
—	DF	CRO	Boris Bjelkanović (from (Slovenia) Bonifika Izola)

Out: Note: Flags indicate national team as defined under FIFA eligibility rules; some limited exceptions apply. Players may hold more than one non-FIFA nationality.

No.	Pos.	Nation	Player
—	GK	GRE	Eleftherios Mappas (to Chalkanoras Idaliou)
—	GK	ENG	William Viner (released)
—	DF	CYP	Nikos Themistokleous (released)
—	MF	FRA	Addnane El Archi (released)
—	MF	CYP	Marios Christodoulou (to Ermis Aradippou)

=== APOEL ===
In: Note: Flags indicate national team as defined under FIFA eligibility rules; some limited exceptions apply. Players may hold more than one non-FIFA nationality.

No.	Pos.	Nation	Player
—	DF	GRE	Savvas Poursaitidis (from Anorthosis Famagusta)
—	DF	CYP	Marios Elia (loan return from Ethnikos Achna)
—	FW	POL	Marcin Żewłakow (from (Belgium) FCV Dender EH)
—	FW	CYP	Andreas Papathanasiou (from Ermis Aradippou)
—	DF	CYP	Paraskevas Christou (from AEK Larnaca)
—	GK	GRE	Dionisis Chiotis (from (Greece) Kerkyra)
—	MF	BRA	Jean Paulista (from (Poland) Wisła Kraków)
—	MF	CYP	Demetris Kyriakou (loan return from Digenis Akritas Morphou)
—	MF	POL	Kamil Kosowski (from (Spain) Cádiz CF)
—	FW	NGR	Benjamin Onwuachi (On loan from (Greece) Ionikos)
—	MF	CYP	Nektarios Alexandrou (from (Greece) AEL)

Out: Note: Flags indicate national team as defined under FIFA eligibility rules; some limited exceptions apply. Players may hold more than one non-FIFA nationality.

No.	Pos.	Nation	Player
—	MF	CYP	Constantinos Makrides (to (Ukraine) Metalurh Donetsk)
—	FW	GRE	Nikos Machlas (Retired)
—	FW	SRB	Nemanja Corović (loan return to (Cyprus) AEL Limassol)
—	MF	CYP	Marios Louka (to AEL Limassol)
—	DF	GRE	Michalis Kapsis (to (Greece) Levadiakos)
—	DF	CYP	Demetris Daskalakis (to AEK Larnaca)
—	FW	BRA	Zé Carlos (to (Portugal) C.D. Trofense)
—	FW	CYP	Sotiris Vourkou (On loan to Doxa Katokopias)
—	MF	CYP	Panayiotis Panayiotou (On loan to Digenis Akritas Morphou)

=== Apollon Limassol ===
In: Note: Flags indicate national team as defined under FIFA eligibility rules; some limited exceptions apply. Players may hold more than one non-FIFA nationality.

No.	Pos.	Nation	Player
—	FW	BRA	David (from Doxa Katokopias)
—	MF	MAR	Abdelkarim Kissi (from Enosis Neon Paralimni)
—	FW	BUL	Hristo Yovov (from Aris Limassol)
—	GK	CYP	Sofronis Avgousti (loan return from AEK Larnaca)
—	MF	CYP	Giorgos Sielis (from (Greece) Chaidari F.C.)
—	DF	MNE	Duško Đurišić (from (Germany) SC Paderborn 07)
—	MF	ARG	Daniel Quinteros (from (Argentina) Club Atlético Banfield)
—	GK	POR	André Queirós (from (Portugal) D.Sandinenses)
—	FW	SEN	Serigne Diop (from (Ukraine) Metalurh Donetsk)
—	DF	ARG	Federico Domínguez (from (Argentina) Gimnasia La Plata)

Out: Note: Flags indicate national team as defined under FIFA eligibility rules; some limited exceptions apply. Players may hold more than one non-FIFA nationality.

No.	Pos.	Nation	Player
—	MF	ROU	Bogdan Andone (to Alki Larnaca)
—	MF	ISR	Lior Asulin (loan return to (Israel) Hapoel Tel Aviv)
—	GK	CYP	Michalis Fani (on loan to ASIL Lyssi)
—	MF	CYP	Michalis Demetriou (on loan to APOP Kinyras Peyias)
—	DF	CYP	Periklis Moustakas (on loan to APOP Kinyras Peyias)
—	DF	ROU	Adrian Iencsi (to (Austria) Kapfenberger SV)
—	MF	ARG	Mariano Torresi (loan return to (Argentina) Godoy Cruz)
—	GK	BUL	Ventsislav Velinov (to (Bulgaria) PFC CSKA Sofia)
—	FW	SEN	Serigne Diop (on loan to PAEEK FC)

=== APOP Kinyras Peyias ===
In: Note: Flags indicate national team as defined under FIFA eligibility rules; some limited exceptions apply. Players may hold more than one non-FIFA nationality.

No.	Pos.	Nation	Player
—	DF	FRA	Sébastien Grimaldi (from (France) AS Saint-Priest)
—	FW	POR	Luís Miguel (from (Portugal) Madalena F.C.)
—	MF	BEL	Fangio Buyse (from Doxa Katokopias)
—	MF	ARG	Julián Kmet (from (Argentina) Ferro Carril Oeste)
—	DF	ARG	Martín Vitali (from (Argentina) Nueva Chicago)
—	DF	POR	Lionel Medeiros (from Omonia)
—	FW	BRA	Rafael Jaques (from (Brazil) SC Ulbra)
—	GK	GER	Elvis Eckardt (from (Germany) FC Thüringen Weida)
—	MF	CYP	Michalis Demetriou (on loan from Apollon Limassol)
—	DF	CYP	Periklis Moustakas (on loan from Apollon Limassol)
—	FW	SRB	Nemanja Mijailović (from (Serbia) FK Bask)
—	FW	POR	Bernardo Vasconcelos (from Omonia)
—	MF	CIV	Lionel Bah (from (France) US Boulogne)
—	FW	CIV	Alain Liri (from (France) US Boulogne)

Out: Note: Flags indicate national team as defined under FIFA eligibility rules; some limited exceptions apply. Players may hold more than one non-FIFA nationality.

No.	Pos.	Nation	Player
—	MF	POR	Tiago Carneiro (to Olympiakos Nicosia)
—	MF	POR	José António Calado (to AEP Paphos)
—	MF	GRE	Nikolaos Chatzis (to Atromitos Yeroskipou)
—	FW	BRA	Gabriel Lima (to Alki Larnaca)
—	DF	BRA	Tinga (to AEP Paphos)
—	DF	BUL	Rosen Kirilov (to (Romania) FC Vaslui)
—	FW	POL	Emmanuel Olisadebe (to (China) Henan Construction)
—	FW	SRB	Nemanja Mijailović (to Doxa Katokopia)

=== Atromitos Yeroskipou ===
In: Note: Flags indicate national team as defined under FIFA eligibility rules; some limited exceptions apply. Players may hold more than one non-FIFA nationality.

No.	Pos.	Nation	Player
—	MF	CYP	Charalambos Charalambous (from AEP Paphos)
—	DF	BRA	Jose de Sousa (from Nea Salamina)
—	FW	CYP	Costas Solomou (from AEP Paphos)
—	MF	BRA	Jocivalter (from Alki Larnaca)
—	MF	CYP	Marios Constantinou (from Akritas Chloraka)
—	MF	GRE	Nikolaos Chatzis (from APOP Kinyras Peyias)
—	DF	POR	Jorge Teixeira (from (Portugal) C.D. Fátima)
—	MF	POR	Paulo Gomes (from (Portugal) F.C. Paços de Ferreira)
—	DF	POR	Hugo Costa (from (Portugal) U.D. Leiria)
—	GK	SVK	Ján Mucha (from (Slovakia) ŠK Slovan Bratislava)
—	FW	MOZ	Fumo (from (Portugal) S.C. Olhanense)
—	DF	GER	Michael Kümmerle (from (Germany) Hessen Kassel)
—	DF	HUN	Aladár Virágh (from (Hungary) Diósgyőri VTK)
—	FW	ARG	Roberto Demus (from (Argentina) Club Almirante Brown)
—	FW	POR	João Paulo (from Doxa Katokopias)
—	DF	POR	Pedro Pereira (from Doxa Katokopias)
—	FW	SEN	Ladji Keita (from (Portugal) Rio Ave)
—	FW	HUN	Zsolt Nagy (from (Ukraine) Prykarpattya Ivano-Frankivsk)
—	MF	BRA	Guilherme (from Ethnikos Achnas)

Out: Note: Flags indicate national team as defined under FIFA eligibility rules; some limited exceptions apply. Players may hold more than one non-FIFA nationality.

No.	Pos.	Nation	Player
—	MF	GRE	Manolis Skyvalos (to AO Ayia Napa)
—	DF	GRE	Spiros Daskalakis (to PAEEK FC)
—	MF	CYP	Giannis Pachtalias (retired)
—	FW	CZE	Zdenek Valnoha (released)
—	GK	HUN	Tomas Papp (to Akritas Chloraka)
—	FW	HUN	Gabor Fekete (to Aris Limassol)
—	GK	POR	Sérgio Leite (to (Portugal) Boavista)
—	GK	POL	Andrzej Ignachuk (released)
—	MF	CYP	Costas Solomou (to Aris Limassol)
—	FW	ARG	Roberto Demus (to (Peru) Coronel Bolognesi)

=== Doxa Katokopia ===
In: Note: Flags indicate national team as defined under FIFA eligibility rules; some limited exceptions apply. Players may hold more than one non-FIFA nationality.

No.	Pos.	Nation	Player
—	MF	POR	Margaça (from (Portugal) Mafra)
—	MF	ANG	Celson (from Atlético Clube de Portugal)
—	FW	CYP	Georgios Eleftheriou (from Nea Salamina)
—	GK	CPV	Ernesto (from (Portugal) Estoril-Praia)
—	MF	POR	Pedro Duarte (from (Portugal) Estoril-Praia)
—	DF	BRA	Rodrigão (from (Portugal) F.C. Vizela)
—	FW	BRA	Serjão (from (Portugal) F.C. Vizela)
—	MF	POR	Saavedra (from (Portugal) Odivelas F.C.)
—	FW	POR	Milton (from (Portugal) Freamunde)
—	DF	CYP	Loukas Stylianou (from Digenis Morphou)
—	MF	POR	Carlos André (from (Portugal) Madalena FC)
—	DF	POR	Comboio (from (Portugal) C.D. Portosantense)
—	FW	NGR	Charles Obi (from (Portugal) Boavista)
—	FW	SRB	Nemanja Mijailović (from APOP Kinyras Peyias)
—	FW	CYP	Sotiris Vourkou (loan from APOEL F.C.)

Out: Note: Flags indicate national team as defined under FIFA eligibility rules; some limited exceptions apply. Players may hold more than one non-FIFA nationality.

No.	Pos.	Nation	Player
—	DF	VEN	Raúl González (to Enosis Neon Paralimni)
—	GK	ARM	Armen Ambartsumyan (to Enosis Neon Paralimni)
—	MF	BEL	Fangio Buyse (to APOP Kinyras Peyias)
—	DF	POR	Júnior (to AEL Limassol)
—	DF	GRE	Demetris Morales (released)
—	FW	BRA	David da Costa (to Apollon Limassol)
—	DF	NGR	Rasheed Alabi (to Omonia)
—	MF	NGR	Lewis Aniweta (to Alki Larnaca)
—	DF	CYP	Evdokimos Serdaris (to Digenis Morphou)
—	GK	GRE	Dimitris Rizos (to (Greece) PAOK FC)
—	DF	CYP	Neophytos Neophytou (to Chalkanoras Idaliou)
—	FW	ANG	Hélder Neto (to (Portugal) A.C. Vila Meã)
—	DF	GRE	Demetris Ignatiades (to Aris Limassol)
—	FW	POR	João Paulo (to Atromitos Yeroskipou)
—	MF	POR	Rui Andrade (to Alki Larnaca)
—	DF	POR	Pedro Pereira (to Atromitos Yeroskipou)

=== Enosis Neon Paralimni ===
In: Note: Flags indicate national team as defined under FIFA eligibility rules; some limited exceptions apply. Players may hold more than one non-FIFA nationality.

No.	Pos.	Nation	Player
—	DF	VEN	Raúl González (from Doxa Katokopia)
—	MF	POR	Alhandra (from (Portugal) U.D. Leiria)
—	MF	IRL	Matt Cassidy (from (England) Bolton Wanderers)
—	GK	ARM	Armen Ambartsumyan (from Doxa Katokopias)
—	DF	ARG	Javier Menghini (from (Chile) Everton de Viña del Mar)
—	FW	CYP	Giorgos Nicolaou (from Nea Salamina)
—	FW	GRE	Alekos Kaklamanos (from (Greece) Kerkyra)
—	DF	GHA	Koffi Amponsah (from (Greece) Apollon Kalamarias)
—	MF	POR	Hugo Faria (from (Portugal) U.D. Leiria)
—	FW	CYP	Giorgos Kolokoudias (from (Greece) Panserraikos F.C.)

Out: Note: Flags indicate national team as defined under FIFA eligibility rules; some limited exceptions apply. Players may hold more than one non-FIFA nationality.

No.	Pos.	Nation	Player
—	MF	CYP	Eleftherios Eleftheriou (to Ethnikos Achna)
—	FW	CYP	Costas Elia (to Alki Larnaca)
—	DF	SLO	Almir Tanjič (to AEP Paphos)
—	MF	BRA	Paquito (loan return to (Switzerland) FC Lucerne)
—	MF	NGR	Eric Ejiofor (to Alki Larnaca)
—	MF	MKD	Igor Jančevski (released)
—	MF	SRB	Pavle Popara (to (Bulgaria) Slavia Sofia)
—	MF	CYP	Adamos Efstathiou (to Digenis Morphou)
—	MF	MAR	Abdelkarim Kissi (to Apollon Limassol)
—	DF	SUI	Henri Siqueira (to (Switzerland) AC Bellinzona)
—	FW	CYP	Demetris Christofi (to AC Omonia)
—	GK	GRE	Vassilis Mitilinaios (to (Greece) Panachaiki)

=== Ethnikos Achna ===
In: Note: Flags indicate national team as defined under FIFA eligibility rules; some limited exceptions apply. Players may hold more than one non-FIFA nationality.

No.	Pos.	Nation	Player
—	MF	GHA	Daniel Edusei (from (Greece) Egaleo F.C.)
—	MF	CYP	Eleftherios Eleftheriou (from Enosis Neon Paralimni)
—	GK	MLI	Mahamadou Sidibè (from (Greece) PAS Giannina)
—	FW	GRE	Dimosthenis Manousakis (from (Greece) Ionikos F.C.)
—	FW	BUL	Zoran Janković (from (Bulgaria) Litex Lovech)
—	FW	CYP	Alekos Alekou (from Aris Limassol)
—	DF	MKD	Vanče Šikov (from (Greece) Olympiacos)
—	MF	SLE	Sahr Lahai (from (Sierra Leone) Giants FC)
—	FW	KOS	Genc Iseni (from (North Macedonia) FK Renova)
—	FW	CYP	Yiasoumis Yiasoumi (from Aris Limassol)

Out: Note: Flags indicate national team as defined under FIFA eligibility rules; some limited exceptions apply. Players may hold more than one non-FIFA nationality.

No.	Pos.	Nation	Player
—	GK	ARG	Guillermo Álvarez (released)
—	DF	CYP	Marios Elia (loan return to APOEL FC)
—	MF	BRA	Guilherme Weisheimer (to Atromitos Yeroskipou)
—	FW	SLO	Patrik Ipavec (to (Slovenia) FC Koper)
—	DF	SLO	Aleš Puš (to (Slovenia) NK Celje)
—	MF	CYP	Charalambos Loizou (to Ermis Aradippou)
—	FW	CYP	Constantinos Georgiades (to Digenis Akritas Morphou)
—	FW	KOS	Genc Iseni (released)
—	DF	BRA	Eduardo Angeli (released)

=== Omonia ===
In: Note: Flags indicate national team as defined under FIFA eligibility rules; some limited exceptions apply. Players may hold more than one non-FIFA nationality.

No.	Pos.	Nation	Player
—	MF	CZE	David Kobylík (from (Germany) Arminia Bielefeld)
—	DF	GER	Thomas Scheuring (from (Germany) SSV Reutlingen)
—	DF	NGR	Rasheed Alabi (from Doxa Katokopia)
—	DF	RWA	Hamad Ndikumana (from Anorthosis FC)
—	FW	SLE	Mustapha Bangura (from Nea Salamina)
—	FW	BRA	Clayton (from Alki Larnaca)
—	DF	CYP	Elias Charalambous (from (Greece) PAOK)
—	DF	GER	Timo Wenzel (from (Germany) FC Augsburg)
—	GK	CYP	Nikolas Asprogenis (free agent)
—	MF	ALB	Klodian Duro (from (Albania) SK Tirana)
—	MF	SLO	Anton Žlogar (from Anorthosis Famagusta)
—	DF	CYP	Theofanis Lagos (from Chalkanoras Idaliou)
—	FW	CYP	Demetris Christofi (from Enosis Neon Paralimni)
—	FW	ARG	Francisco Aguirre (from (Switzerland) FC St. Gallen)
—	MF	CYP	Efstathios Aloneftis (from (Germany) Energie Cottbus)
—	FW	ROU	Claudiu Niculescu (from (Germany) MSV Duisburg)
—	MF	CYP	Ioannis Okkas (from (Spain) Celta de Vigo)
—	DF	SRB	Aleksandar Pantić (from (Serbia) FK Crvena zvezda)

Out: Note: Flags indicate national team as defined under FIFA eligibility rules; some limited exceptions apply. Players may hold more than one non-FIFA nationality.

No.	Pos.	Nation	Player
—	DF	CYP	Akis Ioakim (to Olympiakos Nicosia)
—	DF	CYP	Nicolas Georgiou (retired)
—	DF	CYP	Loizos Kakoyiannis (AEL Limassol)
—	DF	CYP	Giorgos Theodotou (to Anorthosis FC)
—	GK	CYP	Demetris Leoni (to AEP Paphos)
—	GK	GRE	Ilias Stogiannis (to (Greece) Panetolikos F.C.)
—	MF	POR	Edgar Marcelino (to (Spain) Racing Ferrol)
—	MF	SEN	Ismail Ba (to AEP Paphos)
—	MF	BRA	Magno Mocelin (to AEK Larnaca)
—	FW	CYP	Kyriacos Chailis (to AEP Paphos)
—	MF	MNE	Siniša Dobrasinović (to Anorthosis FC)
—	DF	CPV	Nélson Veiga (released)
—	FW	ZIM	Musawengosi Mguni (to (United Arab Emirates) Al-Shabab)
—	FW	POR	Bernardo Vasconcelos (to APOP Kinyras Peyias)
—	FW	CYP	Elias Vattis (to Alki Larnaca)
—	DF	GER	Thomas Scheuring (released)
—	DF	CYP	Giorgos Tsikkos (on loan to MEAP Nisou)

== See also ==
- List of Belgian football transfers summer 2008
- List of Danish football transfers summer 2008
- List of Dutch football transfers summer 2008
- List of English football transfers summer 2008
- List of German football transfers summer 2008
- List of Greek football transfers 2008-09
- List of Maltese football transfers summer 2008
- List of Italian football transfers summer 2008 (July)
- List of Italian football transfers summer 2008 (August)
- List of Scottish football transfers 2008-09
- List of Spanish football transfers summer 2008
- List of Turkish football transfers 2008-09
