= List of Cypriot football transfers winter 2008–09 =

This is a list of Cypriot football transfers for the 2008–09 winter transfer window by club. Only transfers of the Cypriot First Division are included.

The winter transfer window opened on 1 January 2009, although a few transfers took place prior to that date. The window closed at midnight on 1 February 2009. Players without a club may join one at any time, either during or in between transfer windows.

== Player Transfers ==
=== AEK Larnaca ===
In: Note: Flags indicate national team as defined under FIFA eligibility rules; some limited exceptions apply. Players may hold more than one non-FIFA nationality.

| No. | Pos. | Nation | Player |
|---|---|---|---|
| 13 | MF | MAR | Abdelkarim Kissi (from Apollon Limassol) |
| 86 | MF | CYP | Kyriacos Pavlou (on loan from AC Omonia) |
| 24 | DF | EGY | Amir Azmy (from (Turkey) Hacettepe SK) |
| 32 | FW | BRA | Silva (from Alki Larnaca) |
| 77 | MF | POR | Tiquinho (from Anorthosis FC) |
| 35 | GK | SRB | Miloš Adamović (Free Agent) |
| 4 | DF | CPV | Nélson Veiga (Free Agent) |
| 35 | FW | SRB | Milan Belić (from AEP Paphos) |

Out: Note: Flags indicate national team as defined under FIFA eligibility rules; some limited exceptions apply. Players may hold more than one non-FIFA nationality.

| No. | Pos. | Nation | Player |
|---|---|---|---|
| 40 | FW | NGR | Joseph Nwafor (to (Israel) Hakoah Amidar Ramat Gan) |
| 18 | DF | CYP | Demetris Daskalakis (to (Greece) Ethnikos Asteras) |
| 16 | DF | BRA | Marcelo Costa (Released) |
| 88 | DF | SRB | Dejan Ilić (Released) |
| 14 | MF | MAR | Hamid Rhanem (to APOP Kinyras Peyias) |
| 21 | MF | GBS | Ednilson (Released) |
| 9 | FW | GBS | Dionisio Mendes (to (Israel) Bnei Sakhnin) |
| 1 | GK | CMR | Joslain Mayebi (to (Israel) Hakoah Amidar Ramat Gan) |
| 35 | GK | BUL | Ivaylo Petrov (to (Bulgaria) CSKA Sofia) |
| 26 | MF | CZE | Martin Abraham (Released) |
| 27 | DF | CZE | Pavel Pergl (to (Germany) Dynamo Dresden) |

=== AEL Limassol ===
In: Note: Flags indicate national team as defined under FIFA eligibility rules; some limited exceptions apply. Players may hold more than one non-FIFA nationality.

| No. | Pos. | Nation | Player |
|---|---|---|---|
| 8 | FW | ANG | Freddy (from Enosis Neon Paralimni) |
| 55 | MF | POR | Miguel Vargas (from APOP Kinyras Peyias) |
| 99 | MF | BRA | Clayton (from AC Omonia) |
| 5 | MF | CYP | Stelios Parpas (from Aris Limassol) |

Out: Note: Flags indicate national team as defined under FIFA eligibility rules; some limited exceptions apply. Players may hold more than one non-FIFA nationality.

| No. | Pos. | Nation | Player |
|---|---|---|---|
| 9 | FW | SRB | Nemanja Čorović (to Digenis Morphou) |
| 10 | MF | PER | Julio García (to Enosis Neon Paralimni) |
| 33 | MF | CYP | Petros Filaniotis (to Ethnikos Achna) |

=== AEP Paphos ===
In: Note: Flags indicate national team as defined under FIFA eligibility rules; some limited exceptions apply. Players may hold more than one non-FIFA nationality.

| No. | Pos. | Nation | Player |
|---|---|---|---|
| 12 | GK | MKD | Jane Nikolovski (from APOEL FC) |
| 69 | DF | POR | Jorge Teixeira (from Atromitos Yeroskipou) |
| 99 | FW | SEN | Ladji Keita (from Atromitos Yeroskipou) |
| 38 | MF | CZE | Martin Kolar (from (Sweden) Helsingborgs IF) |
| 32 | MF | GRE | Nikolaos Chatzis (from Atromitos Yeroskipou) |
| 50 | FW | SLE | Mustapha Bangura (on loan from AC Omonia) |

Out: Note: Flags indicate national team as defined under FIFA eligibility rules; some limited exceptions apply. Players may hold more than one non-FIFA nationality.

| No. | Pos. | Nation | Player |
|---|---|---|---|
| 25 | MF | BRA | Leonardo de Oliveira (Released) |
| 1 | GK | NED | Joost Terol (to (Netherlands) AGOVV Apeldoorn) |
| 24 | MF | GAM | Jatto Ceesay (to Digenis Morphou) |
| 19 | FW | NED | Ronny Van Es (to (Greece) Doxa Dramas) |
| 5 | DF | CYP | Themis Agathokleous (to Akritas Chlorakas) |
| 13 | GK | CYP | Demetris Leoni (to Anorthosis FC) |
| 15 | DF | GER | Marco Förster (to (Greece) Anagennisi Karditsa) |
| 10 | FW | SRB | Sása Jovanović (to Akritas Chlorakas) |
| 11 | FW | SRB | Milan Belić (to AEK Larnaca) |
| 21 | FW | CYP | Charalambos Demosthenous (on loan to Atromitos Yeroskipou) |

=== Alki Larnaca ===
In: Note: Flags indicate national team as defined under FIFA eligibility rules; some limited exceptions apply. Players may hold more than one non-FIFA nationality.

| No. | Pos. | Nation | Player |
|---|---|---|---|
| 23 | MF | URU | Fabrizio Cetraro (from (Uruguay) C.A. Progreso) |
| 40 | GK | ARG | Ramiro González (from (Spain) Pinatar CF) |
| 48 | MF | BLR | Mikalay Strizhkov (unknown) |
| 77 | DF | ROU | Pompiliu Stoica (from (Russia) Tom Tomsk) |
| 29 | FW | POL | Tomasz Sajdak (from (Finland) HJK Helsinki) |
| 55 | FW | BRA | Pepe (from (South Africa) Bidvest Wits) |
| 56 | DF | BRA | Dimitri ( (Brazil) Vitória SP) |

Out: Note: Flags indicate national team as defined under FIFA eligibility rules; some limited exceptions apply. Players may hold more than one non-FIFA nationality.

| No. | Pos. | Nation | Player |
|---|---|---|---|
| — | MF | POR | Rui Andrade (to Atromitos Yeroskipou) |
| 8 | MF | ROU | Bogdan Andone (to Ermis Aradippou) |
| 14 | MF | BRA | Leandro Naldoni (Released) |
| 99 | FW | POR | Edgar (Released) |
| 32 | FW | BRA | Silva (to AEK Larnaca) |
| 89 | MF | SEN | Lamine Sakho (Released) |

=== Anorthosis FC ===
In: Note: Flags indicate national team as defined under FIFA eligibility rules; some limited exceptions apply. Players may hold more than one non-FIFA nationality.

| No. | Pos. | Nation | Player |
|---|---|---|---|
| 18 | MF | ROU | Eugen Trică (from (Romania) CFR Cluj) |
| 31 | GK | CYP | Demetris Leoni (from AEP Paphos) |
| 80 | MF | CYP | Alexandros Garpozis (from Apollon Limassol) |
| 70 | FW | CYP | Giorgos Tofas (on loan from (Greece) AEK Athens) |

Out: Note: Flags indicate national team as defined under FIFA eligibility rules; some limited exceptions apply. Players may hold more than one non-FIFA nationality.

| No. | Pos. | Nation | Player |
|---|---|---|---|
| 7 | MF | POR | Tiquinho (to AEK Larnaca) |
| 10 | MF | POR | Paulo Costa (on loan to APOEL) |
| 77 | FW | CYP | Stefanos Voskaridis (on loan to Enosis Neon Paralimni) |

=== APEP Pitsilia ===
In: Note: Flags indicate national team as defined under FIFA eligibility rules; some limited exceptions apply. Players may hold more than one non-FIFA nationality.

| No. | Pos. | Nation | Player |
|---|---|---|---|
| 30 | MF | MOZ | Fumo (from Atromitos Yeroskipou) |
| 39 | MF | FRA | Amadou Sanokho (Free Agent) |
| 29 | GK | ITA | Luigi Gennamo (from Free Agent) |

Out: Note: Flags indicate national team as defined under FIFA eligibility rules; some limited exceptions apply. Players may hold more than one non-FIFA nationality.

| No. | Pos. | Nation | Player |
|---|---|---|---|
| 1 | GK | FRA | Christophe Ott (to (France) Pau FC) |
| 11 | FW | NGR | Andrew Esealuka (to Aris Limassol) |
| 92 | DF | CRO | Boris Bjelkanović (to Atromitos Yeroskipou) |

=== Apoel ===
In: Note: Flags indicate national team as defined under FIFA eligibility rules; some limited exceptions apply. Players may hold more than one non-FIFA nationality.

| No. | Pos. | Nation | Player |
|---|---|---|---|
| 16 | MF | POR | Paulo Costa (On loan from Anorthosis) |

Out: Note: Flags indicate national team as defined under FIFA eligibility rules; some limited exceptions apply. Players may hold more than one non-FIFA nationality.

| No. | Pos. | Nation | Player |
|---|---|---|---|
| 12 | GK | MKD | Jane Nikolovski (to (Cyprus) AEP Paphos) |
| 9 | FW | CYP | Andreas Papathanasiou (On loan to Ermis Aradippou) |

=== Apollon Limassol ===
In: Note: Flags indicate national team as defined under FIFA eligibility rules; some limited exceptions apply. Players may hold more than one non-FIFA nationality.

| No. | Pos. | Nation | Player |
|---|---|---|---|
| 83 | MF | GER | Ioannis Masmanidis (from (Germany) 1. FC Nürnberg) |
| 81 | DF | ISL | Haraldur Freyr Guðmundsson (from (Denmark) Aalesunds FK) |
| 87 | FW | CHI | Mauricio Pinilla (from (Brazil) Vasco de Gama) |
| 36 | DF | POR | Diogo Luís (from (Portugal) Leixões S.C.) |

Out: Note: Flags indicate national team as defined under FIFA eligibility rules; some limited exceptions apply. Players may hold more than one non-FIFA nationality.

| No. | Pos. | Nation | Player |
|---|---|---|---|
| 3 | DF | ARG | Federico Domínguez (to (Uruguay) Club Nacional de Football) |
| 5 | MF | HUN | Gábor Korolovszky (to Aris Limassol) |
| 99 | DF | CYP | Petros Konnafis (to Olympiakos Nicosia) |
| 6 | MF | MAR | Abdelkarim Kissi (to AEK Larnaca) |
| 44 | MF | CYP | Giorgos Sielis (on loan to Olympiakos Nicosia) |
| 7 | FW | BUL | Hristo Yovov (to (Bulgaria) PFC Levski Sofia) |
| 19 | MF | CYP | Alexandros Garpozis (to Anorthosis FC) |
| 28 | GK | POR | André Queirós (Released) |

=== APOP Kinyras Peyias ===
In: Note: Flags indicate national team as defined under FIFA eligibility rules; some limited exceptions apply. Players may hold more than one non-FIFA nationality.

| No. | Pos. | Nation | Player |
|---|---|---|---|
| 15 | MF | MAR | Hamid Rhanem (from AEK Larnaca) |
| 80 | MF | GRE | Giannis Retsas (from (Greece) Kerkyra) |
| 70 | MF | BRA | Guilherme Weisheimer (from Atromitos Yeroskipou) |
| 10 | MF | POR | Edgar Marcelino (from (Spain) Racing de Ferrol) |
| 21 | FW | CPV | José Semedo (from (Portugal) Rio Ave F.C.) |

Out: Note: Flags indicate national team as defined under FIFA eligibility rules; some limited exceptions apply. Players may hold more than one non-FIFA nationality.

| No. | Pos. | Nation | Player |
|---|---|---|---|
| 13 | DF | POR | Carlos Marques (to (Portugal) C.D. Pinhalnovense) |
| 6 | DF | POR | Lionel Medeiros (Released) |
| 17 | MF | ARG | Julián Kmet (Released) |
| 31 | FW | POR | Luís Miguel (to Enosis Neon Paralimni) |
| 55 | MF | POR | Miguel Vargas (to AEL Limassol) |

=== Atromitos Yeroskipou ===
In: Note: Flags indicate national team as defined under FIFA eligibility rules; some limited exceptions apply. Players may hold more than one non-FIFA nationality.

| No. | Pos. | Nation | Player |
|---|---|---|---|
| 32 | DF | POR | Rui Andrade (from Alki Larnaca) |
| 31 | FW | COD | Papi Kimoto (from (Belgium) R.F.C. de Liège) |
| 19 | FW | CYP | Charalambos Demosthenous (on loan from AEP Paphos) |
| 84 | DF | CRO | Boris Bjelkanović (from APEP Pitsilia) |

Out: Note: Flags indicate national team as defined under FIFA eligibility rules; some limited exceptions apply. Players may hold more than one non-FIFA nationality.

| No. | Pos. | Nation | Player |
|---|---|---|---|
| 29 | FW | SEN | Ladji Keita (to AEP Paphos) |
| 25 | DF | POR | Jorge Teixeira (to AEP Paphos) |
| 11 | MF | GRE | Nikolaos Chatzis (to AEP Paphos) |
| 10 | FW | MOZ | Fumo (to APEP Pitsilia) |
| 4 | DF | POR | Hugo Costa (Released) |
| 30 | FW | HUN | Zsolt Nagy (to ASIL Lysi) |
| 3 | DF | HUN | Aladár Virágh (to Anagennisi Dherynia) |
| 7 | MF | BRA | Guilherme (from APOP Kinyras Peyias) |

=== Doxa Katokopia ===
In: Note: Flags indicate national team as defined under FIFA eligibility rules; some limited exceptions apply. Players may hold more than one non-FIFA nationality.

| No. | Pos. | Nation | Player |
|---|---|---|---|
| 6 | DF | CPV | Spencer (from (Portugal) F.C. Maia) |
| 2 | MF | POR | Luís Torres (from Atlético Clube de Portugal) |
| 30 | FW | CPV | Mateus (from (Portugal) Rio Ave F.C.) |
| 77 | DF | POR | Mario Silva (from (Portugal) Boavista) |

Out: Note: Flags indicate national team as defined under FIFA eligibility rules; some limited exceptions apply. Players may hold more than one non-FIFA nationality.

| No. | Pos. | Nation | Player |
|---|---|---|---|
| 20 | FW | SRB | Nemanja Mijailović (to (Montenegro) FK Buducnost Podgorica) |
| 30 | FW | NGR | Charles Obi (Released) |

=== Enosis Neon Paralimni ===
In: Note: Flags indicate national team as defined under FIFA eligibility rules; some limited exceptions apply. Players may hold more than one non-FIFA nationality.

| No. | Pos. | Nation | Player |
|---|---|---|---|
| 50 | MF | NGR | Blessing Kaku (from (Israel) Maccabi Petah Tikva) |
| 31 | FW | POR | Luís Miguel (from APOP Kinyras Peyias) |
| 77 | FW | CYP | Stefanos Voskaridis (on loan from Anorthosis FC) |
| 15 | DF | NGR | Eric Ejiofor (from Alki Larnaca) |
| 60 | MF | PER | Julio García (from AEL Limassol) |
| 99 | FW | GAM | Mustapha Kamal N'Daw (from (Greece) Veria) |
| 37 | MF | SVK | Mário Breška (on loan from (Germany) 1. FC Nürnberg) |

Out: Note: Flags indicate national team as defined under FIFA eligibility rules; some limited exceptions apply. Players may hold more than one non-FIFA nationality.

| No. | Pos. | Nation | Player |
|---|---|---|---|
| 9 | MF | ANG | Freddy (to AEL Limassol) |
| 6 | MF | CPV | Puma (to PAEEK FC) |
| 23 | MF | CPV | Néné (to (Spain) Pontevedra) |
| 18 | MF | COD | Jeff Tutuana (to AO Ayia Napa) |

=== Ethnikos Achna ===
In: Note: Flags indicate national team as defined under FIFA eligibility rules; some limited exceptions apply. Players may hold more than one non-FIFA nationality.

| No. | Pos. | Nation | Player |
|---|---|---|---|
| 21 | MF | BRA | Eduardo Pincelli (from Chalkanoras Idaliou) |
| 33 | MF | CYP | Petros Filaniotis (from AEL Limassol) |
| 28 | MF | SEN | Abdoulaye Niang (from (Greece) Kavala) |

Out: Note: Flags indicate national team as defined under FIFA eligibility rules; some limited exceptions apply. Players may hold more than one non-FIFA nationality.

| No. | Pos. | Nation | Player |
|---|---|---|---|
| 3 | DF | BRA | Eduardo Angeli (Released) |
| 21 | FW | BUL | Zoran Janković (to (Serbia) FK Inđija) |
| 16 | MF | CYP | Elipidoforos Elia (on loan to Olympiakos Nicosia) |
| — | FW | KOS | Genc Iseni (to (North Macedonia) FK Milano) |

=== Omonia ===
In: Note: Flags indicate national team as defined under FIFA eligibility rules; some limited exceptions apply. Players may hold more than one non-FIFA nationality.

| No. | Pos. | Nation | Player |
|---|---|---|---|
| 32 | FW | SRB | Dušan Đokić (on loan from (Belgium) Club Brugge) |
| 18 | DF | POL | Rafał Kosznik (from (Poland) Lechia Gdańsk) |
| 14 | MF | GRE | Dimitrios Grammozis (from (Greece) Ergotelis) |

Out: Note: Flags indicate national team as defined under FIFA eligibility rules; some limited exceptions apply. Players may hold more than one non-FIFA nationality.

| No. | Pos. | Nation | Player |
|---|---|---|---|
| 18 | DF | CYP | Theofanis Lagos (on loan to Nea Salamina) |
| 11 | MF | CYP | Kyriacos Pavlou (on loan to AEK Larnaca) |
| 20 | FW | SLE | Mustapha Bangura (on loan to AEP Paphos) |
| 17 | MF | CZE | David Kobylík (to (Czech Republic) Sigma Olomouc) |
| 6 | DF | BRA | Marcelo Pletsch (Released) |
| 22 | MF | BRA | Clayton (to AEL Limassol) |

== See also ==
- (Belgium) List of Belgian football transfers winter 2008–09
- (Denmark) List of Danish football transfers winter 2008-09
- (Netherlands) List of Dutch football transfers winter 2008-09
- (England) List of English football transfers winter 2008-09
- (Germany) List of German football transfers winter 2008–09
- (Italy) List of Italian football transfers winter 2008–09
- (Malta) List of Maltese football transfers winter 2008-09
- (Spain) List of Spanish football transfers winter 2008-09
