= List of Cypriot football transfers winter 2010–11 =

This is a list of Cypriot football transfers for the 2010–11 winter transfer window by club. Only transfers by clubs of the Cypriot First Division and Cypriot Second Division are included.

The winter transfer window opened on 1 January 2011, although a few transfers took place prior to that date. The window closed at midnight on 31 January 2011. Players without a club may join one at any time, either during or in between transfer windows.

== Marfin Laiki League ==
=== AEK Larnaca ===
In:

No.	Pos.	Nation	Player
—	FW	ESP	Gorka Pintado (on loan from (England) Swansea City)
—	MF	BEL	Tom Caluwé (free transfer from (Belgium) Sint-Truidense V.V.)
—	MF	ARG	Gonzalo Cabrera (from Doxa Katokopias)
—	FW	CYP	Alekos Alekou (from APOP Kinyras Peyias)

Out:

No.	Pos.	Nation	Player
—	FW	ESP	Arnal (to Doxa Katokopias)
—	MF	BRA	Jean Paulista (released)
—	DF	CYP	Kyriacos Kyriacou (on loan to Nea Salamina)
—	FW	CYP	Pierakis Kastanas (on loan to Othellos Athienou F.C.)
—	DF	CYP	Michalis Demetriou (to Chalkanoras Idaliou)

=== AEL Limassol ===
In:

No.	Pos.	Nation	Player
—	GK	POL	Arkadiusz Malarz (from (Greece) AEL)
—	MF	POR	Silas (from (Portugal) U.D. Leiria)
—	MF	BRA	Eli (from (Bulgaria) Cherno More)
—	DF	GRE	Vangelis Koutsopoulos (from APOEL)
—	MF	CHI	Nicolás Crovetto (from (Italy) A.S. Taranto Calcio)
—	FW	POR	Henrique (from Doxa Katokopias F.C.)
—	DF	POR	Carlos Marques (from APOP Kinyras Peyias FC)

Out:

No.	Pos.	Nation	Player
—	GK	SVK	Kamil Čontofalský (to (Greece) AEL)
—	MF	SVK	Balázs Borbély (released)
—	DF	RWA	Hamad Ndikumana (to (Cyprus) APOP Kinyras Peyias FC)
—	MF	EIR	Matthew Cassidy (released)

=== AEP Paphos ===
In:

No.	Pos.	Nation	Player
—	DF	GHA	Ransford Addo (free agent)
—	FW	POR	Bernardo Vasconcelos (from (Israel) Hapoel Be'er Sheva)
—	MF	ESP	Jonathan Aspas (free agent)

Out:

No.	Pos.	Nation	Player
—	MF	POL	Maciej Scherfchen (to (Poland) Warta Poznań)
—	FW	POR	Pedro Moutinho (to (Scotland) Falkirk F.C.)
—	DF	SVK	Stanislav Velický (released)
—	MF	SRB	Ivan Jovanović (released)

=== Alki Larnaca ===
In:

No.	Pos.	Nation	Player
—	FW	POR	António Semedo (from (Romania) Unirea Urziceni)
—	MF	BRA	Roberto Brum (from (Brazil) Santos FC)
—	GK	POL	Radosław Cierzniak (from (Poland) Korona Kielce)
—	MF	EIR	Robbie Gibbons (from (England) Nottingham Forest F.C.)
—	MF	ARG	Darío Fernández (from (Israel) Beitar Jerusalem F.C.)
—	MF	SVN	Luka Žinko (from (Russia) FC Amkar Perm)

Out:

No.	Pos.	Nation	Player
—	GK	CYP	Demetris Leoni (released)
—	FW	FRA	Christian Nadé (released)
—	FW	BRA	Bruno Quadros (to (Brazil) Clube Atlético Linense)
—	MF	CYP	Marios Zachariou (to ASIL)
—	MF	GRE	Demetris Maris (to Doxa Katokopia)
—	MF	CYP	Eleftherios Eleftheriou (retired)
—	MF	CYP	Michalis Markou (retired)
—	FW	FRA	Kevin Nadé (on loan to ASIL)

=== Anorthosis ===
In:

No.	Pos.	Nation	Player
—	MF	SRB	Marko Ljubinković (from (Serbia) FK Sloboda Point Sevojno)
—	DF	BUL	Stanislav Angelov (from (Romania) FC Steaua Bucuresti)
—	DF	NED	Civard Sprockel (from (Netherlands) Vitesse Arnhem)
—	GK	POL	Wojciech Kowalewski (from (Russia) FC Sibir Novosibirsk)
—	DF	NED	Jürgen Colin (from (Netherlands) RKC Waalwijk)
—	FW	ARG	Emanuel Perrone (from (Greece) Atromitos F.C.)
—	MF	NGA	Richard Eromoigbe (from (Nigeria) Warri Wolves F.C.)

Out:

No.	Pos.	Nation	Player
—	DF	ESP	Biel Medina (released)
—	FW	ARG	Lucas Concistre (to (Chile) Ñublense)
—	FW	BOL	Ronald García (loan return to (Greece) Aris Thessaloniki F.C.)
—	GK	ARG	Marcos Argüello (to (Bolivia) Club Bolívar)
—	DF	ARG	Pablo Frontini (to (Bolivia) Club Bolívar)
—	FW	CYP	Andreas Kyprianou (to (Greece) Ionikos F.C.)
—	FW	MNE	Marko Vidović (to (Bulgaria) Levski Sofia)
—	FW	ARG	Damián Lizio (to (Bolivia) Club Bolívar)
—	DF	GRE	Georgios Georgiou (to (Greece) OFI)
—	GK	CYP	Nikolas Asprogenis (loan return to AC Omonia)

=== APOEL ===
In: Note: Flags indicate national team as defined under FIFA eligibility rules; some limited exceptions apply. Players may hold more than one non-FIFA nationality.

No.	Pos.	Nation	Player

Out: Note: Flags indicate national team as defined under FIFA eligibility rules; some limited exceptions apply. Players may hold more than one non-FIFA nationality.

No.	Pos.	Nation	Player
—	DF	GRE	Vangelis Koutsopoulos (to AEL Limassol)

=== Apollon Limassol ===
In: Note: Flags indicate national team as defined under FIFA eligibility rules; some limited exceptions apply. Players may hold more than one non-FIFA nationality.

No.	Pos.	Nation	Player

Out: Note: Flags indicate national team as defined under FIFA eligibility rules; some limited exceptions apply. Players may hold more than one non-FIFA nationality.

No.	Pos.	Nation	Player

=== APOP Kinyras Peyias ===
In: Note: Flags indicate national team as defined under FIFA eligibility rules; some limited exceptions apply. Players may hold more than one non-FIFA nationality.

No.	Pos.	Nation	Player
—	MF	ARG	Roberto Carboni (free agent)
—	FW	HUN	Thomas Sowunmi (from (Hungary) BFC Siófok)
—	MF	POR	Manuel Lopes (from (Greece) Panthrakikos F.C.)
—	FW	NGA	Jeremiah Ani (free agent)
—	DF	RWA	Hamad Ndikumana (from AEL Limassol)

Out: Note: Flags indicate national team as defined under FIFA eligibility rules; some limited exceptions apply. Players may hold more than one non-FIFA nationality.

No.	Pos.	Nation	Player
—	FW	CIV	Franck Madou (to (Ukraine) FC Zorya Luhansk)
—	MF	ANG	Diangi Matusiwa (to (Belgium) K.V.K. Tienen)
—	MF	CYP	Constantinos Samaras (to Ermis Aradippou)
—	MF	ISR	Yehiel Tzagai (to (Israel) Hapoel Be'er Sheva F.C.)
—	MF	POR	Edgar Marcelino (to (Portugal) G.D. Estoril Praia)
—	MF	CYP	Giannis Retsas (released)
—	MF	CYP	Pavlos Neofytou (released)
—	FW	CYP	Alekos Alekou (to AEK Larnaca)
—	DF	POR	Carlos Marques (to AEL Limassol)

=== Doxa Katokopia ===
In: Note: Flags indicate national team as defined under FIFA eligibility rules; some limited exceptions apply. Players may hold more than one non-FIFA nationality.

No.	Pos.	Nation	Player
—	DF	ESP	Iván Benítez (from (Spain) Atlético Madrid B)
—	FW	ESP	Arnal Llibert (from AEK Larnaca)
—	MF	GAM	Seyfo Soley (free agent)
—	DF	GRE	Demetris Maris (from Alki Larnaca)
—	GK	SRB	Igor Kojić (free agent)

Out: Note: Flags indicate national team as defined under FIFA eligibility rules; some limited exceptions apply. Players may hold more than one non-FIFA nationality.

No.	Pos.	Nation	Player
—	DF	ARG	Andrés Imperiale (to Aris Limassol)
—	FW	ZIM	Thabani Moyo (released)
—	MF	POR	Marco Bicho (to (Angola) Clube Desportivo Primeiro de Agosto)
—	MF	ALB	Geri Malaj (on loan to Atromitos Yeroskipou)
—	FW	POR	Henrique (to AEL Limassol)
—	MF	ARG	Gonzalo Cabrera (to AEK Larnaca)
—	MF	ARG	Matías Escobar (to Enosis Neon Paralimni)
—	DF	POR	Igor Pita (to (Portugal) C.S. Marítimo)
—	MF	POR	Élio (to (Portugal) S.C. Beira-Mar)
—	GK	HUN	Zsolt Posza (to (Hungary) Balatonlelle SE)
—	FW	FRA	Daniel Gomez (released)

=== Enosis Neon Paralimni ===
In: Note: Flags indicate national team as defined under FIFA eligibility rules; some limited exceptions apply. Players may hold more than one non-FIFA nationality.

No.	Pos.	Nation	Player
—	FW	CMR	Hervé Onana (on loan from (Belgium) Sint-Truidense V.V.)
—	DF	CYP	Demetris Moulazimis (loan return from (Italy) Ascoli Primavera)
—	GK	BUL	Georgi Petkov (from (Bulgaria) PFC Levski Sofia)
—	MF	ARG	Matías Escobar (from Doxa Katokopia)
—	FW	MKD	Zoran Baldovaliev (from (Israel) Hapoel Ironi Kiryat Shmona F.C.)

Out: Note: Flags indicate national team as defined under FIFA eligibility rules; some limited exceptions apply. Players may hold more than one non-FIFA nationality.

No.	Pos.	Nation	Player
—	FW	SLE	Paul Kpaka (to Chalkanoras Idaliou)
—	FW	MKD	Krste Velkovski (to (North Macedonia) FK Rabotnički)
—	FW	SRB	Ivan Pejčić (released)

=== Ermis Aradippou ===
In: Note: Flags indicate national team as defined under FIFA eligibility rules; some limited exceptions apply. Players may hold more than one non-FIFA nationality.

No.	Pos.	Nation	Player
—	MF	CYP	Constantinos Samaras (from APOP Kinyras)
—	MF	POR	Filipe Pastel (from (Canada) Montreal Impact)
—	DF	BUL	Yordan Petkov (from (Bulgaria) PFC Slavia Sofia)
—	MF	MOZ	Eduardo Jumisse (from (Portugal) Portimonense S.C.)
—	FW	ARG	Dante Formica (from (Paraguay) Club Sport Colombia)

Out: Note: Flags indicate national team as defined under FIFA eligibility rules; some limited exceptions apply. Players may hold more than one non-FIFA nationality.

No.	Pos.	Nation	Player
—	MF	CYP	Giorgos Constanti (released)
—	MF	PAN	Gabriel Gómez (to (Colombia) La Equidad)
—	DF	POR	Joel (released)
—	MF	BRA	Fabinho (to (Latvia) Skonto FC)
—	FW	CYP	Kyriacos Chailis (to Nea Salamina)
—	MF	POR	Paulo Costa (to Aris Limassol)
—	MF	NGA	Azubuike Oliseh (released)

=== Ethnikos Achna ===
In: Note: Flags indicate national team as defined under FIFA eligibility rules; some limited exceptions apply. Players may hold more than one non-FIFA nationality.

No.	Pos.	Nation	Player

Out: Note: Flags indicate national team as defined under FIFA eligibility rules; some limited exceptions apply. Players may hold more than one non-FIFA nationality.

No.	Pos.	Nation	Player

=== Olympiakos Nicosia ===
In: Note: Flags indicate national team as defined under FIFA eligibility rules; some limited exceptions apply. Players may hold more than one non-FIFA nationality.

No.	Pos.	Nation	Player
—	GK	ALB	Isli Hidi (from (Albania) Dinamo Tirana)
—	DF	CPV	Paulo de Pina (from (Portugal) C.D. Fátima)

Out: Note: Flags indicate national team as defined under FIFA eligibility rules; some limited exceptions apply. Players may hold more than one non-FIFA nationality.

No.	Pos.	Nation	Player
—	FW	BRA	Brasilia (to (Brazil) Uberaba Sport Club)
—	DF	BRA	Fernando de Abreu (to (Finland) IFK Mariehamn)
—	GK	ALB	Arjan Beqaj (released)

=== Omonia ===
In: Note: Flags indicate national team as defined under FIFA eligibility rules; some limited exceptions apply. Players may hold more than one non-FIFA nationality.

No.	Pos.	Nation	Player

Out: Note: Flags indicate national team as defined under FIFA eligibility rules; some limited exceptions apply. Players may hold more than one non-FIFA nationality.

No.	Pos.	Nation	Player
—	MF	GRE	Dimitrios Grammozis (to (Greece) Kerkyra)

== Cypriot Second Division ==
=== Adonis Idaliou ===
In: Note: Flags indicate national team as defined under FIFA eligibility rules; some limited exceptions apply. Players may hold more than one non-FIFA nationality.

No.	Pos.	Nation	Player
—	FW	CYP	Constantinos Georgiades (free agent)
—	FW	CYP	Sozos Fasouliotis (from Othellos Athienou)
—	MF	CYP	Panayiotis Onisiforou (from Nea Salamina)

Out: Note: Flags indicate national team as defined under FIFA eligibility rules; some limited exceptions apply. Players may hold more than one non-FIFA nationality.

No.	Pos.	Nation	Player
—	DF	CYP	Giorgos Ioannou (to Akritas Chlorakas)
—	FW	POR	Ângelo (released)
—	DF	CYP	Pantelis Tavrou (released)

=== Akritas Chlorakas ===
In: Note: Flags indicate national team as defined under FIFA eligibility rules; some limited exceptions apply. Players may hold more than one non-FIFA nationality.

No.	Pos.	Nation	Player
—	MF	CPV	Nilton Fernandes (from (Bulgaria) PSFC Chernomorets Burgas)
—	FW	MAR	Yassine El Alaoui (free agent)
—	FW	MOZ	Fumo (free agent)
—	DF	CYP	Giorgos Ioannou (from Adonis Idaliou)

Out: Note: Flags indicate national team as defined under FIFA eligibility rules; some limited exceptions apply. Players may hold more than one non-FIFA nationality.

No.	Pos.	Nation	Player
—	FW	CMR	Jaspa Dipa (released)
—	MF	GRE	Sakis Arazos (released)
—	DF	CYP	Lakis Nikita (released)

=== Anagennisi Deryneia ===
In: Note: Flags indicate national team as defined under FIFA eligibility rules; some limited exceptions apply. Players may hold more than one non-FIFA nationality.

No.	Pos.	Nation	Player
—	MF	SRB	Zoran Stjepanović (from PAEEK FC)
—	FW	CYP	Georgios Kolokoudias (from Digenis Akritas Morphou)
—	FW	SLE	Brima Koroma (from (Faroe Islands) B36 Torshavn)

Out: Note: Flags indicate national team as defined under FIFA eligibility rules; some limited exceptions apply. Players may hold more than one non-FIFA nationality.

No.	Pos.	Nation	Player
—	MF	POR	Marco Freitas (to (Portugal) C.F. Caniçal)
—	FW	GRE	Christos Panayiotopoulos (released)
—	MF	EIR	Michael Roddy (released)

=== APEP Pitsilia ===
In: Note: Flags indicate national team as defined under FIFA eligibility rules; some limited exceptions apply. Players may hold more than one non-FIFA nationality.

No.	Pos.	Nation	Player
—	MF	POL	Robert Hirsz (from (Poland) Lechia Gdańsk)
—	MF	FRA	Ludovic Jiulivert (free agent)
—	GK	POL	Maciej Czyzniewski (free agent)
—	DF	CZE	Karel Kratochvil (free agent)

Out: Note: Flags indicate national team as defined under FIFA eligibility rules; some limited exceptions apply. Players may hold more than one non-FIFA nationality.

No.	Pos.	Nation	Player
—	MF	GER	Heiner Backhaus (released)
—	MF	FRA	Franck Akamba (released)
—	GK	SCO	Derek Soutar (released)
—	FW	COD	Papi Kimoto (released)

=== Aris Limassol ===
In: Note: Flags indicate national team as defined under FIFA eligibility rules; some limited exceptions apply. Players may hold more than one non-FIFA nationality.

No.	Pos.	Nation	Player
—	MF	POR	Paulo Costa (from Ermis Aradippou)
—	DF	ARG	Andrés Imperiale (from Doxa Katokopia)

Out: Note: Flags indicate national team as defined under FIFA eligibility rules; some limited exceptions apply. Players may hold more than one non-FIFA nationality.

No.	Pos.	Nation	Player
—	DF	BEN	John Glélé (released)
—	FW	NGA	David Opara (released)
—	MF	CYP	Adamos Efstathiou (to Omonia Aradippou)
—	MF	POR	João Paulo (released)

=== ASIL ===
In: Note: Flags indicate national team as defined under FIFA eligibility rules; some limited exceptions apply. Players may hold more than one non-FIFA nationality.

No.	Pos.	Nation	Player
—	MF	CYP	Marios Zachariou (from Alki Larnaca F.C.)
—	FW	FRA	Kevin Nade (on loan from Alki Larnaca F.C.)

Out: Note: Flags indicate national team as defined under FIFA eligibility rules; some limited exceptions apply. Players may hold more than one non-FIFA nationality.

No.	Pos.	Nation	Player
—	MF	CYP	Giorgos Odysseos (released)
—	DF	CYP	Avraam Avraam (released)

=== Atromitos Yeroskipou ===
In: Note: Flags indicate national team as defined under FIFA eligibility rules; some limited exceptions apply. Players may hold more than one non-FIFA nationality.

No.	Pos.	Nation	Player
—	MF	ALB	Geri Malaj (on loan from Doxa Katokopias F.C.)
—	FW	MAR	Hicham Chirouf (from (France) FC Mulhouse)

Out: Note: Flags indicate national team as defined under FIFA eligibility rules; some limited exceptions apply. Players may hold more than one non-FIFA nationality.

No.	Pos.	Nation	Player
—	FW	GRE	Demetris Papastergiou (released)
—	DF	LVA	Aleksandrs Solovjovs (released)
—	DF	GRE	Giannis Sfakianakis (released)
—	FW	HAI	Abel Thermeus (released)
—	FW	FRA	Axel Bossekota (released)

=== Chalkanoras Idaliou ===
In: Note: Flags indicate national team as defined under FIFA eligibility rules; some limited exceptions apply. Players may hold more than one non-FIFA nationality.

No.	Pos.	Nation	Player
—	DF	SCO	Jamie McKenzie (from (Republic of Ireland) Galway United F.C.)
—	FW	SLE	Paul Kpaka (from Enosis Neon Paralimni FC)
—	DF	CYP	Michalis Demetriou (from AEK Larnaca)

Out: Note: Flags indicate national team as defined under FIFA eligibility rules; some limited exceptions apply. Players may hold more than one non-FIFA nationality.

No.	Pos.	Nation	Player
—	MF	POR	Mário Carlos (released)
—	FW	BRA	Alessandro Soares (to (Brazil) Funorte Esporte Clube)

=== Digenis Akritas Morphou ===
In: Note: Flags indicate national team as defined under FIFA eligibility rules; some limited exceptions apply. Players may hold more than one non-FIFA nationality.

No.	Pos.	Nation	Player
—	DF	GRE	Demetris Ignatiades (free agent)
—	MF	ROU	Robert Neagoe (free agent)
—	MF	POR	Cristiano Filipe Tavares Piedade (free agent)
—	MF	BEL	Gérard Lifondja (free agent)

Out: Note: Flags indicate national team as defined under FIFA eligibility rules; some limited exceptions apply. Players may hold more than one non-FIFA nationality.

No.	Pos.	Nation	Player
—	DF	POL	Przemysław Otuszewski (to (Poland) Warta Poznań)
—	MF	SVK	Peter Kiška (released)
—	MF	POR	Filipe Falardo (to Atlético Clube de Portugal)
—	MF	POL	Łukasz Masłowski (released)
—	GK	CYP	Alexandros Kleovoulou (released)
—	MF	GRE	Thanasis Noutsos (released)
—	MF	CYP	Georgios Theodosiou (released)
—	FW	CYP	Georgios Kolokoudias (to Anagennisi Dherynia)

=== Nea Salamina ===
In: Note: Flags indicate national team as defined under FIFA eligibility rules; some limited exceptions apply. Players may hold more than one non-FIFA nationality.

No.	Pos.	Nation	Player
—	MF	MAR	Hamid Rhanem (free agent)
—	FW	CYP	Kyriacos Chailis (from Ermis Aradippou)
—	MF	EST	Martin Vunk (from (Sweden) Syrianska FC)
—	DF	CYP	Kyriacos Kyriacou (on loan from AEK Larnaca F.C.)
—	MF	POR	Rui Figueiredo (from Onisilos Sotira)

Out: Note: Flags indicate national team as defined under FIFA eligibility rules; some limited exceptions apply. Players may hold more than one non-FIFA nationality.

No.	Pos.	Nation	Player
—	FW	GER	Joseph Laumann (to (Vietnam) Ninh Bình)
—	MF	CYP	Panayiotis Onisiforou (to Adonis Idaliou)
—	MF	GRE	Stavros Tsoukalas (loan return to (Greece) PAOK FC)
—	DF	GRE	Christos Tripsas (released)
—	MF	BRA	José de Souza (released)
—	MF	CZE	Lukáš Vaculík (released)

=== Omonia Aradippou ===
In: Note: Flags indicate national team as defined under FIFA eligibility rules; some limited exceptions apply. Players may hold more than one non-FIFA nationality.

No.	Pos.	Nation	Player
—	MF	EST	Deniss Malov (from (Estonia) FC Levadia Tallinn)
—	MF	CYP	Adamos Efstathiou (from Aris Limassol F.C.)

Out: Note: Flags indicate national team as defined under FIFA eligibility rules; some limited exceptions apply. Players may hold more than one non-FIFA nationality.

No.	Pos.	Nation	Player
—	MF	BEN	Florent Raimy (to (Malta) Marsaxlokk F.C.)
—	MF	BRA	Carlão (released)

=== Onisilos Sotira ===
In: Note: Flags indicate national team as defined under FIFA eligibility rules; some limited exceptions apply. Players may hold more than one non-FIFA nationality.

No.	Pos.	Nation	Player
—	MF	POR	Rodilson (free agent)
—	MF	LVA	Juris Hlibovs (from (Latvia) FK Daugava Rīga)

Out: Note: Flags indicate national team as defined under FIFA eligibility rules; some limited exceptions apply. Players may hold more than one non-FIFA nationality.

No.	Pos.	Nation	Player
—	MF	ENG	Harrison Bayley (released)
—	MF	SLE	Sahr Lahai (released)
—	MF	POR	Rui Figueiredo (to Nea Salamis Famagusta FC)
—	MF	CYP	Costas Kastanos (to Achyronas Liopetriou)

=== Othellos Athienou F.C. ===
In: Note: Flags indicate national team as defined under FIFA eligibility rules; some limited exceptions apply. Players may hold more than one non-FIFA nationality.

No.	Pos.	Nation	Player
—	MF	FRA	Karim Boudjema (from (Singapore) Etoile FC)
—	FW	POR	Sérgio Grilo (from (Portugal) Moreirense F.C.)
—	FW	CYP	Pierakis Kastanas (on loan from AEK Larnaca)

Out: Note: Flags indicate national team as defined under FIFA eligibility rules; some limited exceptions apply. Players may hold more than one non-FIFA nationality.

No.	Pos.	Nation	Player
—	MF	CYP	Savvas Thoupos (released)
—	FW	CYP	Sozos Fasouliotis (to Adonis Idaliou)

=== PAEEK FC ===
In: Note: Flags indicate national team as defined under FIFA eligibility rules; some limited exceptions apply. Players may hold more than one non-FIFA nationality.

No.	Pos.	Nation	Player
—	FW	GRE	Georgios Vakouftsis (from (Greece) Niki Volos)
—	FW	POR	Pedras (from (Portugal) F.C. Tirsense)

Out: Note: Flags indicate national team as defined under FIFA eligibility rules; some limited exceptions apply. Players may hold more than one non-FIFA nationality.

No.	Pos.	Nation	Player
—	FW	BUL	Mario Metushev (releases)
—	MF	SRB	Zoran Stjepanović (to Anagennisi Dherynia)
