= Đenić =

Đenić (Serbian Cyrillic: Ђeнић; also transliterated Djenić) is a Serbian surname. It may refer to:

- Dejan Đenić (born 1986), Serbian football striker
- Petar Đenić (born 1977), Serbian football midfielder

== See also ==
- Denice (given name)
