= Pedro Pereira =

Pedro Pereira may refer to:

- Pedro Pereira (footballer, born 1978), Portuguese footballer
- Pedro Pereira (footballer, born 1984), Portuguese footballer
- Pedro Pereira (footballer, born 1998), Portuguese footballer
- Pedro Álvares Pereira (13??–1385), Portuguese noble
- Pedro Homem Pereira, the 17th and last Captain-major of Portuguese Ceylon 1591–1594
- Pedro Queiroz Pereira (1949–2018), Portuguese businessman and competition driver
- Pedro Teotónio Pereira (1902–1972), Portuguese politician and diplomat
