= Ejiofor =

Ejiofor is a Nigerian surname. It may refer to:

- Chiwetel Ejiofor (born 1977), British actor
- Duke Ejiofor (born 1995), American football player
- Eric Ejiofor (born 1979), Nigerian football player
- Linda Ejiofor (born 1986), Nigerian actress
- Zuby Ejiofor (born 2004), American basketball player
