= Rui Andrade =

Rui Andrade may refer to:

- Rui Andrade (footballer) (born 1977), Portuguese footballer
- Rui Andrade (racing driver) (born 1999), Angolan-Portuguese racing driver
