= Pedro Torrão =

Portuguese footballer

Personal information
- Full name: Pedro Miguel Ferreira Silva Torrão
- Date of birth: 12 March 1977 (age 49)
- Place of birth: Vila Franca de Xira, Portugal
- Height: 1.70 m (5 ft 7 in)
- Position: Midfielder

Youth career
- 1989–1995: Vilafranquense
- 1995–1996: Sporting CP

Senior career*
Years	Team	Apps	(Gls)
1996–1998	Lourinhanense	16	(3)
1998	Salgueiros	1	(0)
1998–1999	União Lamas	30	(4)
1999–2001	Campomaiorense	61	(1)
2001–2004	Alverca	86	(1)
2004–2005	União Leiria	19	(0)
2005–2007	Beira-Mar	36	(1)
2007	Omonia	12	(0)
2008	Nea Salamina	9	(1)
2008–2010	AEL Limassol	38	(0)
2010–2011	Torreense	4	(0)
2011–2012	Vilafranquense		
Total		312	(11)

International career
1997	Portugal U20	3	(0)
1999	Portugal U21	1	(0)
- * Club domestic league appearances and goals

Pedro Miguel Ferreira Silva Torrão (born 12 March 1977) is a Portuguese retired footballer who played as a midfielder.

== Club career ==
Born in Vila Franca de Xira, Lisbon District, Torrão made his professional debut with S.C. Salgueiros in January 1998 after unsuccessfully emerging through local U.D. Vilafranquense's youth ranks and having a one-and-a-half-year spell with the farm team of Sporting CP. In the following seasons he played in the two major divisions in Portuguese football, with relative impact; successively, he represented C.F. União de Lamas, S.C. Campomaiorense, F.C. Alverca (which he helped promote from the second division in 2003), U.D. Leiria and S.C. Beira-Mar.

In late January 2007, at nearly 30, Torrão left the Aveiro side and joined AC Omonia, but only lasted there a few months, moving clubs in the country in the summer after signing with Nea Salamis Famagusta FC.

After again failing to impress, he joined a third side in Cyprus, AEL Limassol, in the 2008 off-season, where he firmly established as first-choice in the playmaker position, rejoining former teammate – in Sporting's academy, Alverca and Leiria – Miguel Vargas; also, he suffered a severe hip injury which sidelined him for several months.
