= Geri Malaj =

Albanian footballer

Personal information
- Full name: Geri Malaj Kola
- Date of birth: 14 October 1989 (age 37)
- Place of birth: Qyteti Stalin, Albania
- Height: 1.86 m (6 ft 1 in)
- Position: Midfielder

Youth career
- 2001–2007: Deportivo La Coruña

Senior career*
| Years | Team | Apps | (Gls) |
| 2006–2010 | Deportivo B | | |
| 2010–2011 | Doxa Katokopia | 4 | (0) |
| 2011 | Atromitos Yeroskipou | 0 | (0) |
| 2011–2012 | Deportivo Dorneda | | |
| 2012–2013 | Bergantiños | 19 | (4) |
| 2013 | Cerceda | 1 | (0) |
| 2013–2014 | Deportivo Dorneda | 59 | (14) |
| 2014–2019 | Atlético Arteixo | 24 | (6) |
| 2019–2020 | Laracha | 19 | (5) |
| 2020–2022 | Silva SD | 25 | (0) |

International career
| 2007 | Albania U21 | 1 | (0) |
- * Club domestic league appearances and goals as of 20 November 2016

Geri Malaj Kola (born 14 October 1989) is an Albanian footballer who plays as a central midfielder for Spanish club Atlético Arteixo.
