= Carlos Fernandes (footballer, born 1978) =

Portuguese footballer

Personal information
- Full name: Carlos Miguel Brandão Fernandes
- Date of birth: 5 May 1978 (age 48)
- Place of birth: Lisbon, Portugal
- Height: 1.87 m (6 ft 2 in)
- Position: Left-back

Team information
- Current team: Varzim (manager)

Youth career
- 1987–1989: Tenente Valdez
- 1989–1996: Sporting CP

Senior career*
Years	Team	Apps	(Gls)
1996–1999	Sporting CP	2	(0)
1997–1998	→ Lourinhanense (loan)	30	(7)
1998–1999	→ Campomaiorense (loan)	12	(0)
1999–2002	Farense	76	(2)
2002–2004	Belenenses	61	(6)
2004–2006	Boavista	28	(1)
2006–2008	Braga	42	(1)
2008–2009	Marítimo	2	(0)
2009	Marítimo B	4	(0)
2009–2011	Olhanense	49	(3)
2011–2012	Naval	4	(0)
Total		310	(20)

International career
1997–1998	Portugal U20	11	(1)
1999	Portugal U21	1	(0)
2001	Portugal B	1	(0)

Managerial career
- 2022–2023: Vianense
- 2023–2026: União Santarém
- 2026–: Varzim
- * Club domestic league appearances and goals

Carlos Miguel Brandão Fernandes (born 5 May 1978) is a Portuguese former professional footballer who played as a left-back. He is currently manager of Varzim.

He amassed Primeira Liga totals of 272 games and 13 goals over 15 seasons, mainly in representation of Farense and Braga (three years apiece). He started his 16-year senior career with Sporting CP.

== Playing career ==
Fernandes was born in Lisbon. During his professional career, the unsuccessful product of Sporting CP's youth system represented, among other clubs, C.F. Os Belenenses and Boavista FC, having made his Primeira Liga debut with S.C. Campomaiorense in 1998. In mid-January 2006 he joined S.C. Braga, appearing in seven UEFA Cup matches over the course of his two full seasons.

In July 2008, Fernandes signed with C.S. Marítimo, recently qualified for the UEFA Cup. He was released in January 2009, moving in July to S.C. Olhanense which in turn had returned to the top division after 34 years.

In the subsequent top-flight campaign, Fernandes was first-choice left-back and also scored twice. On 12 December 2009, he opened the score at home against S.L. Benfica in an eventual 2–2 draw; Olhanense also managed to stay up, after finishing in 13th position.

== Coaching career ==
Fernandes started his managerial career in March 2022, being appointed at fourth division club SC Vianense. On 28 April 2023, he was dismissed.

On 7 December 2023, Fernandes signed for União de Santarém in the same league. He led his team to promotion to Liga 3 in his first season, taking the place of bankrupt Vitória de Setúbal.
