= Miguel Vargas (footballer, born 1978) =

Portuguese footballer

Personal information
- Full name: Miguel Rodrigo Pereira Vargas
- Date of birth: 18 November 1978 (age 47)
- Place of birth: Lisbon, Portugal
- Height: 1.65 m (5 ft 5 in)
- Position: Winger

Youth career
- 1988–1997: Sporting CP

Senior career*
Years	Team	Apps	(Gls)
1997–2000	Sporting CP	0	(0)
1997–1998	→ Académica (loan)	21	(3)
1998–1999	→ Lourinhanense (loan)	16	(14)
1999	→ Paços Ferreira (loan)	16	(4)
1999–2000	→ Espinho (loan)	15	(1)
2000–2001	Sporting B	19	(6)
2001–2004	Alverca	59	(10)
2004	União Leiria	2	(0)
2005–2006	Estoril	23	(5)
2006–2008	APOP	56	(15)
2009–2011	AEL Limassol	60	(8)
2011–2012	AEP	26	(11)
2013	Ayia Napa	7	(2)
Total		320	(79)

International career
1998	Portugal U21	3	(0)
- * Club domestic league appearances and goals

Miguel Rodrigo Pereira Vargas (born 18 November 1978) is a Portuguese former footballer who played as a winger.

== Club career ==
An unsuccessful Sporting CP youth graduate, Lisbon-born Vargas only appeared for its reserves as a senior, also being loaned three times, the first at Académica de Coimbra where he made his Primeira Liga debut at age 19.

After his release in the summer of 2001, Vargas moved to F.C. Alverca, experiencing his most steady period in his country with three consecutive seasons – two of those in the top division – being relegated in 2003–04. Subsequently, he moved to U.D. Leiria, but quickly changed to G.D. Estoril Praia of the second level, initially on loan.

Vargas began playing abroad in the 2006 off-season, his first stop being with Cyprus' APOP Kinyras FC, being instrumental as the side managed to remain in the First Division during his tenure. He moved clubs in the same country in the January transfer window of 2009, signing with AEL Limassol and rejoining former Sporting (youth), Alverca and Leiria teammate Pedro Torrão; again an undisputed starter, he provided several assists to his team's goals while also scoring twice in as many wins (against Doxa Katokopias FC for the game's only and at Nea Salamis Famagusta FC, a 3–1 win, both in the 2009–10 campaign).
