= Niche (footballer) =

Bissau-Guinean footballer

Personal information
- Full name: Dionisio Fernandes Mendes
- Date of birth: September 21, 1981 (age 45)
- Place of birth: Bissau, Guinea-Bissau
- Height: 1.84 m (6 ft 0 in)
- Position: Striker

Senior career*
Years	Team	Apps	(Gls)
2000–2001	Lourinhanense	29	(9)
2001–2002	Torreense	13	(6)
2002–2004	Vilafranquense	58	(29)
2004–2005	Leixões	43	(6)
2006	Barreirense	14	(5)
2006–2008	Stade Tunisien	49	(25)
2008	AEK Larnaca	11	(0)
2009	Bnei Sakhnin	10	(0)
2009–2010	Fátima	13	(0)
2010–2011	Torreense	16	(2)
2011	APEP	1	(0)
2012	Stade Tunisien	10	(0)

International career
2003–2012	Guinea-Bissau	12	(2)
- * Club domestic league appearances and goals as of 1 September 2008

Dionísio Fernandes Mendes (born May 21, 1981, in Bissau), commonly nicknamed Niche, is a Bissau-Guinean football striker.

== Career ==
Some of his other former teams include Lourinhanense, Torreense, Vilafranquense, Leixões, Barreirense, Stade Tunisien and AEK Larnaca of Cyprus.
