= Loukas Louka (footballer) =

Cypriot footballer (born 1978)

Personal information
- Full name: Loukas Louka
- Date of birth: 17 April 1978 (age 48)
- Place of birth: Larnaca, Cyprus
- Height: 1.79 m (5 ft 10 in)
- Position: Defender

Senior career*
Years	Team	Apps	(Gls)
1997–2002	Anorthosis	65	(12)
2002–2003	Ethnikos Asteras	12	(2)
2003–2008	Anorthosis	76	(6)
2008–2009	Alki Larnaca	28	(0)
2009–2011	AEK Larnaca	26	(2)

International career
1999–2007	Cyprus	21	(0)
- * Club domestic league appearances and goals as of May 14, 2011

Loukas Louka (born 17 April 1978 in Larnaca, Cyprus) is a Cypriot football defender who played for Anorthosis Famagusta FC. He also played in Greece for Ethnikos Asteras.

Louka has made 21 appearances for the Cyprus national football team.
