= List of Greek football transfers summer 2008 =

This is a list of Greek football transfers for the 2008 summer transfer window. Only moves featuring at least one Super League Greece club are listed.

== Transfers ==
Date	Name	Moving from	Moving to	Fee
31 August 2008	(Argentina) Agustín Pelletieri	Lanús	AEK Athens	Loan
31 August 2008	(Algeria) Rafik Djebbour	Panionios	AEK Athens	€2,800,000
14 August 2008	(United States) Clint Mathis	Ergotelis	Major League Soccer (Real Salt Lake)	Free
17 August 2008	(Brazil) Diogo Luis Santo	Portuguesa	Olympiacos	€9,000,000
2 August 2008	(Greece) Sokratis Papastathopoulos	AEK Athens	Genoa	€4,000,000
1 August 2008	(Greece) Sotiris Kyrgiakos	Eintracht Frankfurt	AEK Athens	Free
31 July 2008	(Greece) Angelos Basinas	Real Mallorca	AEK Athens	Free
30 July 2008	(Brazil) Rodrigo de Souza Cardoso	Flamengo	Panathinaikos	Free
17 July 2008	(Brazil) Gilberto Silva	Arsenal FC	Panathinaikos	€2,500,000
5 July 2008	(Greece) Avraam Papadopoulos	Aris	Olympiacos	€2,500,000
5 July 2008	(Croatia) Ante Rukavina	Hajduk Split	Panathinaikos	€2,300,000
24 June 2008	(Serbia) Vladimir Mudrinić	FK Smederevo	Thrasyvoulos	Free
24 June 2008	(Argentina) Roberto Battión	Argentinos Juniors	Aris	Free
24 June 2008	(Poland) Piotr Włodarczyk	Zagłębie Lubin	Aris	Free
24 June 2008	(South Africa) Glen Salmon	PAOK	Supersport United	Free
23 June 2008	(Ivory Coast) Ibrahima Bakayoko	AEL	PAOK	Free
21 June 2008	(Greece) Lazaros Christodoulopoulos	PAOK	Panathinaikos	€2,200,000
20 June 2008	(Brazil) Anderson Marcelo da Silva	Boavista	Asteras Tripolis	Free
19 June 2008	(Argentina) Ignacio Scocco	UNAM Pumas	AEK Athens	€1,300,000
19 June 2008	(Greece) Dimitris Mavrogenidis	Iraklis	Thrasyvoulos	Free
19 June 2008	(Greece) Giannis Chloros	Iraklis	Thrasyvoulos	Free
15 June 2008	(Chile) Pablo Contreras	Braga	PAOK	Free
13 June 2008	(Brazil) Alexandre Silva Cleyton	AEL	Panathinaikos	€1,600,000
12 June 2008	(Serbia) Vladimir Ivić	Aris	PAOK	Free
10 June 2008	(Australia) Nathan Burns	Adelaide United FC	AEK Athens	Free
9 June 2008	(Slovakia) Jozef Kožlej	AEL	Thrasyvoulos	Free
5 June 2008	(Greece) Ilias Anastasakos	Thrasyvoulos	PAOK	Free
5 June 2008	(Hungary) Dániel Tőzsér	AEK Athens	Genk	€1,500,000
3 June 2008	(Greece) Giannis Papadopoulos	Iraklis	Olympiacos	€800,000
3 June 2008	(Greece) Aggelos Digkozis	Skoda Xanthi	Panserraikos	Free
3 June 2008	(Greece) Fotis Kipouros	AEL	Panserraikos	Free
2 June 2008	(Greece) Anestis Agritis	Kickers Offenbach	Iraklis	Free
2 June 2008	(Croatia) Anthony Šerić	Panathinaikos	Beşiktaş	Free
30 May 2008	(Slovenia) Dino Seremet	Kallithea	AEL	Free
28 May 2008	(Greece) Konstantinos Chalkias	Aris	PAOK	Free
27 May 2008	(Austria) Gernot Plassnegger	SK Austria Kärnten	Ergotelis	Free
27 May 2008	(Portugal) Daniel Márcio Fernandes	PAOK	VfL Bochum	€1,150,000
26 May 2008	(Greece) Konstantinos Andriolas	Atromitos	Panionios	Free
26 May 2008	(Brazil) Alexandre D'Acol	-	Panionios	Free
23 May 2008	(Slovakia) Pavel Kovać	Apollon Kalamarias	Olympiacos	Free
21 May 2008	(Greece) Giannis Barkoglou	Apollon Kalamarias	Panionios	Free
20 May 2008	(Sweden) Daniel Majstorović	Basel	AEK Athens	Free
16 May 2008	(Greece) Antonis Rikka	Skoda Xanthi	AEK Athens	€600,000
16 May 2008	(Greece) Dimitris Kiliaras	Ergotelis	Panionios	Free
2 May 2008	(Brazil) Maciel Lima Barbosa da Cunha	U.D. Leiria	Skoda Xanthi	Free
