= Alejandro Gavatorta =

Argentine footballer

Personal information
- Full name: Alejandro Roberto Gavatorta
- Date of birth: March 21, 1980 (age 46)
- Place of birth: Gálvez, Santa Fe, Argentina
- Height: 1.80 m (5 ft 11 in)
- Position: Midfielder

Senior career*
Years	Team	Apps	(Gls)
2001–2004	Colón	23	(0)
2004	Aosta Sarre	4	(0)
2005–2007	Politehnica Iași	44	(2)
2007–2008	FC Thun	45	(1)
2008–2009	Politehnica Iași	15	(0)
Total		131	(3)
- * Club domestic league appearances and goals as of 18 October 2015

Alejandro Roberto Gavatorta (born 21 March 1980) is an Argentine retired football midfielder.

== Career ==
Gavatorta was born on 21 March 1980 in Gálvez, Santa Fe, Argentina. He made his Argentine Primera División debut, playing for Colón on 3 March 2002 when coach Jorge Fossati sent him in the 65th minute to replace Gerardo Solano in a 1–1 draw against Chacarita Juniors. He made 23 league appearances for Colón over the course of three seasons, before moving to Italy at Aosta Sarre in Serie D.

Gavatorta left Italy after a few months to join Romanian club, Politehnica Iași, making his Divizia A debut on 12 March 2005, as coach Ionuț Popa sent him in the 43rd minute to replace Irinel Ionescu in a 2–0 away loss to Rapid București. He netted his first goal on 14 May 2005 in a 2–1 home loss to Național București. His second goal was scored on 12 August 2006 in another 2–1 loss to Național București.

In 2007, Gavatorta went to play for FC Thun, making his Swiss Super League debut on 11 February when coach Heinz Peischl used him the entire match in a 2–1 away victory against FC Schaffhausen. He scored his only league goal on 12 August 2007 in a 5–2 home loss to FC Aarau, totaling 45 appearances in the competition.

In September 2008, the midfielder returned to Politehnica Iași. On 23 May 2009, Gavatorta made his last Divizia A appearance in a 4–1 away loss to Otopeni, having a total of 59 matches with two goals in the competition.

== After retirement ==
After his playing career ended, Gavatorta worked as a scout and junior coach.
