= Rui Figueiredo =

Portuguese footballer

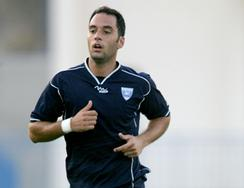

Personal information
- Full name: Rui Jorge Costa Figueiredo
- Date of birth: April 7, 1983 (age 43)
- Place of birth: Barcelos, Portugal
- Height: 1.80 m (5 ft 11 in)
- Position: Midfielder

Team information
- Current team: Cabreiros

Senior career*
Years	Team	Apps	(Gls)
2000–2005	Gil Vicente	19	(1)
2005–2007	C.D. Aves	22	(1)
2007–2009	APEP	26	(3)
2009–2010	Onisilos Sotira	38	(8)
2010	Nea Salamina	12	(0)
2012–2014	Varzim	84	(4)
2014–2015	Limianos	29	(4)
2015–2016	Vilaverdense	16	(1)
2016–2017	Brito	7	(1)
2017–2018	Esposende	8	(2)
2018–	Cabreiros	17	(2)
- * Club domestic league appearances and goals

Rui Jorge Costa Figueiredo (known as Rui Figueiredo) (born 7 April 1983 in Barcelos, Portugal) is a Portuguese football midfielder who plays for SC Cabreiros.

As a kid he joined Gil Vicente, a well-known club in Portugal's Premier league. He made his debut when 17 years old against S.L. Benfica and played for six years, in more than 60 games, in the league.

Then he joined C.D. Aves, becoming an important player in the Portuguese Second Division. He came with C.D. Aves to first division again and played in 2006. He also played for Portugal u-16 becoming European Champion in Israel 2000, also winning the Toulon Tournament in 2003. Figueiredo has 54 caps and 10 goals to his credit.

After playing a season for APEP Pitsilias in the Cypriot First Division, he was a regular starter, he moved to Onisilos Sotira he scored 8 league goals becoming the second best scorer of the team. This season 2010-2011 he moved to Nea Salamis Famagusta FC.
