= Almir Tanjič =

Slovenian footballer

Personal information
- Full name: Almir Tanjič
- Date of birth: 16 January 1979 (age 47)
- Place of birth: Slovenia
- Height: 1.77 m (5 ft 10 in)
- Position: Defender

Senior career*
Years	Team	Apps	(Gls)
1998–2005	Primorje	178	(7)
2005–2008	EN Paralimni	63	(1)
2008–2010	AEP Paphos	37	(0)
2010–2011	Primorje	15	(0)
2014	Bilje	1	(0)

International career^{‡}
2004	Slovenia	3	(0)
- * Club domestic league appearances and goals as of 12 July 2010 ‡ National team caps and goals as of 8 December 2009

Almir Tanjič (born 16 January 1979) is a Slovenian retired football midfielder.

== International career ==
Tanjič has made three appearances for the senior Slovenia national football team, all in 2004.
