= Peter Hodulík =

Slovak footballer

Peter Hodulik
Personal information
- Date of birth: 3 January 1981 (age 45)
- Place of birth: Slovak
- Position: Goalkeeper

Team information
- Current team: PFK Piešťany

Peter Hodulík (born 3 January 1981) is a Slovak football goalkeeper who currently plays for the Majstrovstvá regiónu club PFK Piešťany.

== Clubs ==
- 1998-2001: Alemannia Aachen
- 2001-2006: FC Senec
- 2003-2006: FC Spartak Trnava
- 2006–2008: AEK Larnaca
- ?–2011: ŠK Bernolákovo
- 2011–present: PFK Piešťany
