= Thomas Scheuring =

German footballer

Personal information
- Date of birth: 13 December 1981 (age 44)
- Place of birth: Göppingen, Germany
- Height: 1.79 m (5 ft 10 in)
- Position: Defender

Senior career*
| Years | Team | Apps | (Gls) |
| 2003–2004 | VfL Kirchheim/Teck | | |
| 2004–2008 | SSV Reutlingen | | |
| 2008 | Omonia | | |
| 2009–2011 | VfR Aalen | 62 | (1) |
| 2011–2012 | Waldhof Mannheim | 34 | (1) |
- * Club domestic league appearances and goals

Thomas Scheuring (born 13 December 1981) is a German former professional footballer who played as a defender.

== Career ==
Scheuring was born in Göppingen, Baden-Württemberg. Having been released by AC Omonia he signed for VfR Aalen on 28 May 2009.
