= Ádám Vezér =

Hungarian footballer

Personal information
- Full name: Ádám Vezér
- Date of birth: 21 September 1974 (age 52)
- Place of birth: Budapest, Hungary
- Height: 1.89 m (6 ft 2 in)
- Position: Goalkeeper

Senior career*
Years	Team	Apps	(Gls)
1991–1993	BVSC Budapest	25	(0)
1993–1994	Cegled	–	(–)
1994	Siofok Banyasz	3	(0)
1995–2000	Budapest Honved	150	(0)
2000–2001	Maccabi Tel Aviv	14	(0)
2001–2003	Beitar Be'er Sheva	–	(–)
2003–2004	Anagennisi Deryneia	26	(0)
2004–2007	Omonia	23	(0)
2007–2008	Alki Larnaca	12	(0)
2008	Ethnikos Assia	6	(0)
2009	Elpida Xylofagou	14	(0)
2009–2010	Vecsés FC	26	(0)
2010–2012	BKV Előre SC	49	(0)
2012–2014	Monori SE	–	(-)
- * Club domestic league appearances and goals

Ádám Vezér (born 21 September 1974) is a retired Hungarian goalkeeper who last played for Monori SE in the Hungarian National Championship III.

== Honours ==
- UEFA Cup Winners' Cup:
  1st Round: 1996/97
