= Deportivo Dorneda CF =

Deportivo Dorneda
- Full name: Club Deportivo Dorneda Club de Fútbol
- Founded: 1956
- Ground: O Condús, Dorneda, Oleiros, Galicia, Spain
- Capacity: 1,000
- Chairman: Emilio Suárez
- Manager: Carlos Brizzola
- 2014–15: Preferente Autonómica – North, 20th of 20 (relegated)
Home colours

Club Deportivo Dorneda CF was a Spanish football club based in the parish of Dorneda, Oleiros, Galicia. Founded in 1956, it was dissolved in 2015. The club's home ground is Estadio O Condús, which has a capacity of 1,000 spectators.

== Season to season ==
Season	Tier	Division	Place	Copa del Rey
1956–57	6	2ª Reg.		
1957–58	5	1ª Reg.	9th	
1958–59	5	1ª Reg.	7th	
1959–60	6	2ª Reg.		
1960–61	6	2ª Reg.	4th	
1961–62	6	2ª Reg.	7th	
1962–63	6	2ª Reg.	4th	
1963–64	6	2ª Reg.	6th	
1964–65	6	2ª Reg.	7th	
1965–66	6	2ª Reg.	10th	
1966–67	6	2ª Reg.	10th	
1967–68	6	2ª Reg.	8th	
1968–69	6	2ª Reg.	10th	
1969–70	6	2ª Reg.	10th	
1970–71	6	2ª Reg.	4th	
1971–72	6	2ª Reg.	10th	
1972–73	6	2ª Reg.	10th	
1973–74	6	2ª Reg.	10th	
1974–75	6	3ª Reg.	4th	
1975–76	6	3ª Reg.	2nd	

Season	Tier	Division	Place	Copa del Rey
1976–77	5	2ª Reg.	10th	
1977–78	8	3ª Reg.	4th	
1978–79	8	3ª Reg.	2nd	
1979–80	7	2ª Reg.	10th	
1980–81	7	2ª Reg.	6th	
1981–82	7	2ª Reg.	7th	
1982–83	7	2ª Reg.	11th	
1983–84	7	2ª Reg.	19th	
1984–85	8	3ª Reg.	1st	
1985–86	7	2ª Reg.	5th	
1986–87	7	2ª Reg.	16th	
1987–88	7	2ª Reg.	11th	
1988–89	7	2ª Reg.	11th	
1989–90	7	2ª Reg.	6th	
1990–91	7	2ª Reg.	5th	
1991–92	7	2ª Reg.	13th	
1992–93	8	3ª Reg.	12th	
1993–94	8	3ª Reg.	11th	
1994–95	8	3ª Reg.	2nd	
1995–96	8	3ª Reg.	3rd	

Season	Tier	Division	Place	Copa del Rey
1996–97	8	3ª Reg.	4th	
1997–98	8	3ª Reg.	2nd	
1998–99	8	3ª Reg.	2nd	
1999–2000	8	3ª Reg.	5th	
2000–01	8	3ª Reg.	5th	
2001–02	8	3ª Reg.	5th	
2002–03	8	3ª Reg.	7th	
2003–04	8	3ª Reg.	8th	
2004–05	8	3ª Reg.	3rd	
2005–06	8	3ª Reg.	1st	

Season	Tier	Division	Place	Copa del Rey
2006–07	7	2ª Aut.	1st	
2007–08	6	1ª Aut.	2nd	
2008–09	5	Pref. Aut.	16th	
2009–10	5	Pref. Aut.	3rd	
2010–11	5	Pref. Aut.	2nd	
2011–12	4	3ª	10th	
2012–13	4	3ª	16th	
2013–14	4	3ª	19th	
2014–15	5	Pref. Aut.	20th	

- 3 seasons in Tercera División
