= Giorgos Ioannou =

Greek artist (1926–2017)

- Γιώργος Ιωάννου
- Born: 10 December 1926; Athens, Greece
- Died: 13 February 2017 (aged 90); Athens, Greece
- Movement: Pop art

Giorgos (also mentioned as Yorgos or Georges) Ioannou (10 December 1926 – 13 February 2017) was a Greek artist.

== Biography ==
Born in Athens, he is considered to have been one of the main representatives of the Pop Art movement in Greece.

By adopting the main aspects of pop art and utilizing the techniques employed by comic books, he turned to satirizing social and political reality, creating compositions with a surrealistic atmosphere and symbolic allusions.
