= S.C. Lourinhanense =

Portuguese football club

Lourinhanense
- Full name: Sporting Clube Lourinhanense
- Founded: 1926
- Ground: Estádio Municipal, Lourinhã, Portugal
- Capacity: 2,000
- Chairman: Paulo Marta
- Manager: Nélson Franco
- League: District League Of Lisbon
- 2010–11: 8th
- Website: sclourinhanense.net

Sporting Clube Lourinhanense, simply Lourinhanense, is a Portuguese football club based in Lourinhã, Lisbon. It currently plays in the Regional Championships, and holds home games at Estádio Municipal da Lourinhã, with a capacity of 2,000 seats.

The club was founded in 1926, and served for a time as the farm team of league giants Sporting Clube de Portugal.

== History ==
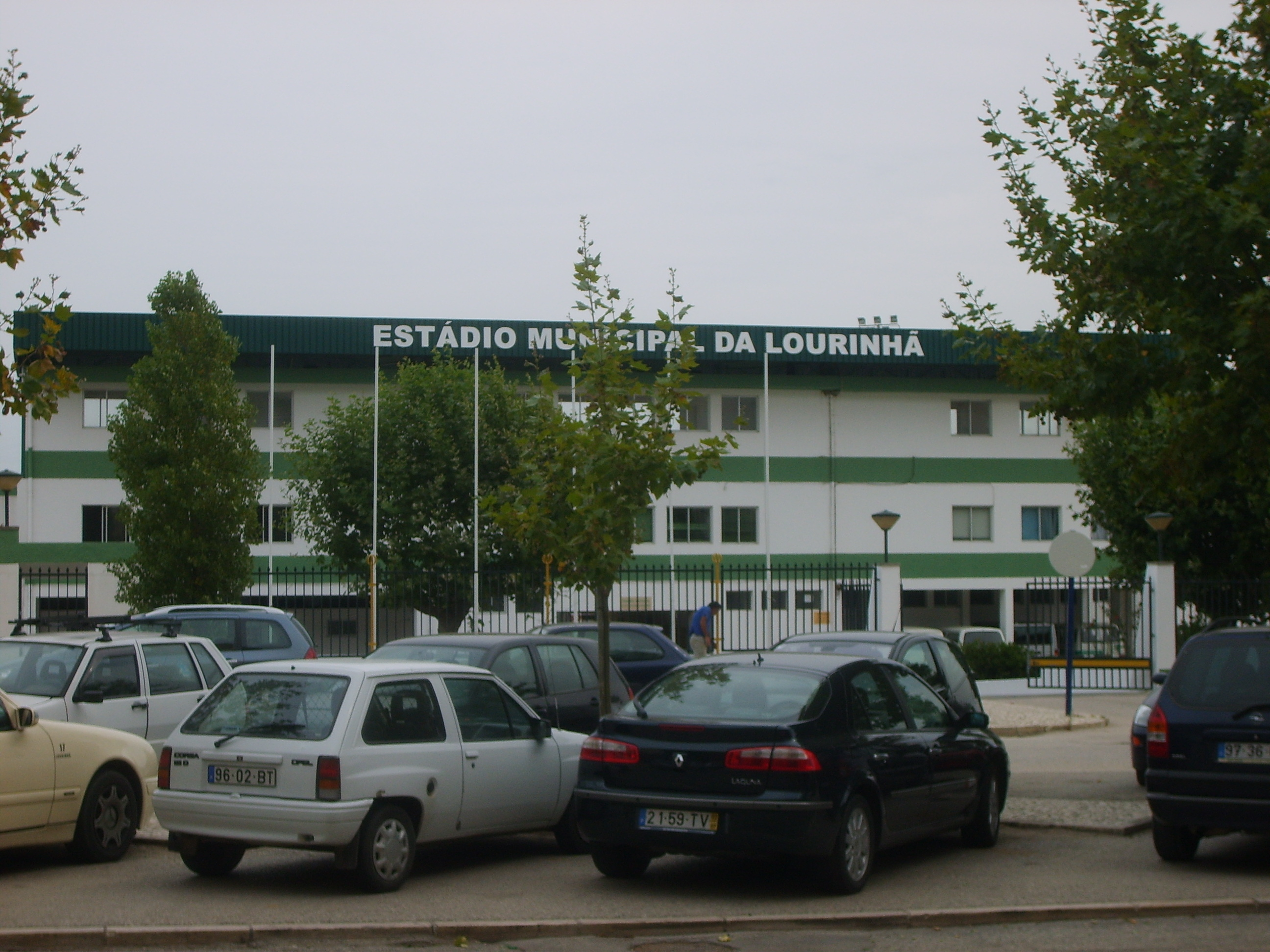
Estadio Municipal da Lourinhã

In 1993 Tiago, a goalkeeper who went on to have a very large spell with Sporting Clube de Portugal, arrived at the club, and stayed for two years before returning to his alma mater. Apart from him, other players groomed at Sporting would eventually represent the club: Luís Boa Morte, Carlos Fernandes and Miguel Vargas, amongst others.

Later on, Lourinhanense signed a new protocol of cooperation, now with F.C. Alverca, receiving players like Manú, who later played for S.L. Benfica.

In the season of 2005–06, the main team played in the championship of the 1st Division of Honor, in Lisbon's Football Association. After a third place in the following year, it was declared that the side's main objective was to achieve financial sanitation.

== Appearances ==
- Tier 3: 6

== League and Cup history ==
Season		Pos.	Pl.	W	D	L	GS	GA	P	Portuguese Cup	Notes
1990–91	Série D	4	34	18	11	5	53	27	45	did not participated	
1991–92	Série D	3	34	17	11	6	48	31	47	did not participated	
1992–93	Série D	1	34	23	8	3	61	52	54	did not participated	
1993–94	Zona Centro	4	34	13	12	9	48	43	38	did not participated	
1994–95	Zona Centro	6	34	12	12	10	48	43	36	did not participated	
1995–96	Zona Centro	14	34	18	11	5	53	27	45	did not participated	
1996–97	Série D	1	34	25	7	3	80	18	82	did not participated	
1997–98	Zona Centro	5	34	14	11	9	55	39	53	did not participated	
1998–99	Zona Centro	3	34	17	11	6	61	34	62	did not participated	
1999–2000	Zona Centro	9	38	16	8	14	59	48	56	did not participated	
2000–01	Zona Centro	19	36	4	7	25	30	82	19	did not participated	
2001–02	Série D	4	34	17	3	4	53	30	64	did not participated	
2002–03	Série D	3	32	19	4	9	63	30	61	did not participated	
2003–04	Série D	7	34	16	9	9	54	40	57	did not participated	
2004–05	Série E	17	34	4	5	25	22	73	17	1st Preliminary	
2005–06	Honra da AF Lisboa	12	34	10	11	13	47	59	41	did not participated	
2006–07	I Divisão – Série 1 da AF Lisboa	3	30	16	6	8	68	36	54	did not participated	
2007–08	I Divisão – Série 1 da AF Lisboa	11	30	10	7	13	46	42	37	did not participated	
2008–09	I Divisão – Série 1 da AF Lisboa	5	30	22	3	5	78	28	50	did not participated	
2009–10	I Divisão – Série 1 da AF Lisboa	1	30	22	3	5	78	28	69	did not participated	
2010–11	Honra da AF Lisboa	8	17	8	3	6	31	25	27	did not participated	
2011–12	I Divisão – Honra da AF Lisboa		align=right	align=right	align=right	align=right	align=right	align=right	align=right		

== Current squad ==
Note: Flags indicate national team as defined under FIFA eligibility rules; some limited exceptions apply. Players may hold more than one non-FIFA nationality.

No.	Pos.	Nation	Player
1	GK	POR	Adrian Neves
2	MF	POR	Sérgio Plácido
3	DF	POR	Diogo Correia
4	DF	BRA	Tiago Bonfim
5	DF	POR	Vitor Ferreira
6	DF	POR	Nelson Costa
7	FW	POR	André Pereira
8	FW	BRA	Maycon Barth
9	FW	POR	Rodrigo Oliveira
10	MF	POR	Guilherme Ramos
11	MF	BRA	Fabricio Silva

No.	Pos.	Nation	Player
16	MF	CHI	Francisco Canales
17	MF	POR	Sérgio Nascimento
20	DF	POR	Ricardo Manuel
21	FW	POR	Amilcar Feliciano
23	FW	POR	Miguel Pereira
24	FW	POR	Ricardo Canoa
25	DF	POR	Carlos Ribeiro
26	MF	POR	Filipe Alves
28	MF	POR	André Lourenço
30	FW	POR	César Ribeiro
50	DF	POR	Filipe Pedro
99	GK	POR	Sérgio Nobre

=== Backroom staff ===
- Néson Franco – Manager
- Miguel Rodrigues – Assistant manager
- João Ribeiro – Director of football
- João Gonçalves – Doctor
- Hélio Mateus – Masseur
- Paulo Marta – Chairman

==== Previous staff ====
- Luís Brás

== Kit ==
The traditional symbols of the club are the green and white colours in a broken shield. In the white side lays a black laurel with golden fruits, with two flowers of a first quarter and the Sun, everything in golden. In the green side, a lion in golden next to the initials SCL, also in golden.

The alternative kit is all yellow.
