= Joseph Nwafor =

Nigerian footballer

Personal information
- Full name: Joseph Obinna Nwafor
- Date of birth: May 5, 1983 (age 43)
- Place of birth: Lagos, Nigeria
- Height: 1.85 m (6 ft 1 in)
- Position: Striker

Senior career*
Years	Team	Apps	(Gls)
2002–2003	Doxa Katokopia	12	(6)
2003	Aris Limassol	23	(14)
2003–2004	Paniliakos	10	(6)
2004–2008	OFI	101	(17)
2008	AEK Larnaca	15	(7)
2009	Hakoah Amidar Ramat Gan	13	(8)
2010	Dolphins F.C.	20	(17)
2011	Becamex Binh Duong	14	(8)
2012	Unión Comercio	31	(4)
2013	Baghdad FC		
- * Club domestic league appearances and goals

Joseph Obinna Nwafor (born May 5, 1983) is a Nigerian professional football striker who most recently played for Unión Comercio in the Peruvian Primera División.
