= Pedro Pereira (footballer, born 1978) =

Portuguese footballer

Personal information
- Full name: Pedro dos Santos Pereira
- Date of birth: 28 July 1978 (age 48)
- Place of birth: Lisbon, Portugal
- Height: 1.74 m (5 ft 8 1/2 in)
- Position: Defender

Youth career
- 1991–1992: SL Olivais
- 1993–1997: Olivais Moscavide

Senior career*
Years	Team	Apps	(Gls)
1997–2001	Olivais Moscavide		
2001–2003	Seixal	58	(7)
2003–2004	Real Massamá		
2005	Imortal		
2005–2007	Atlético	23	(1)
2007	Juventude Évora	8	(0)
2008	Doxa	14	(0)
2008–2010	Atromitos	42	(1)
2010–2011	Madalena	23	(0)
2011–2013	Sintrense	24	(0)
Total		192	(9)
- * Club domestic league appearances and goals

Pedro dos Santos Pereira (born 28 July 1978, in Lisbon) is a Portuguese retired footballer who played mainly as a defender.
