= Marcelo (footballer, born January 1987) =

Brazilian footballer

Personal information
- Full name: Marcelo Costa Resende Siqueira
- Date of birth: January 27, 1987 (age 39)
- Place of birth: Porto Alegre, Brazil
- Height: 1.86 m (6 ft 1 in)
- Positions: Defensive midfielder; centre back

Youth career
- Grêmio FBPA

Senior career*
Years	Team	Apps	(Gls)
2007–2008	CA Metropolitano	?	(1)
2008–2009	AEK Larnaca	?	(?)
2009–2010	Ethnikos Achna	5	(0)
2011–2012	ASA	12	(0)
- * Club domestic league appearances and goals

Marcelo Costa Resende Siqueira (born January 27, 1987, in Porto Alegre) is a Brazilian football player, last played for Agremiação Sportiva Arapiraquense.
