= Petar Đenić =

Serbian footballer

Personal information
- Full name: Petar Đenić
- Date of birth: 14 April 1977 (age 49)
- Place of birth: Niš, Yugoslavia
- Height: 1.91 m (6 ft 3 in)
- Position: Centre back

Senior career*
Years	Team	Apps	(Gls)
1995–1997	Sinđelić Niš	45	(7)
1997–2000	Radnički Niš	74	(7)
2000–2002	Red Star Belgrade	4	(0)
2002–2006	LR Ahlen	79	(2)
2006–2008	Olympiakos Nicosia	33	(3)
2008–2009	Alki Larnaca	27	(1)
2010–2011	Radnički Niš		
2014–2015	Lienden	5	(0)

International career
2000	FR Yugoslavia	1	(0)
- * Club domestic league appearances and goals

Petar Đenić (Serbian Cyrillic: Петар Ђeнић; born 14 April 1977) is a Serbian retired footballer who played as a centre back.

== Club career ==
A native of Niš, Serbia's third-largest city, Đenić started his career with the hometown teams, FK Sinđelić Niš and, later, FK Radnički Niš. He subsequently played for Crvena Zvezda, Ahlen, Olympiakos Nicosia, Alki Larnaca and Lienden. Before the transfer to Red Star Belgrade, he was on trial at German club Bayern Munich.

== International career ==
He played one match for the FR Yugoslavia national team in a friendly match against Greece held on 13 December 2000.
