= Legal release =

Legal instrument

A legal release is a legal instrument that acts to terminate any legal liability between the releasor and the releasee(s), signed by the releasor. A release may also be made orally in some circumstances. Releases are routinely used by photographers, in film production, by documentary filmmakers, oral history project, or by radio and music producers when they photograph, film, video or record the voice or performance of individuals to be sure that the person consents or will not later object to the material being used for whatever purpose the release (or anyone they may assign the release rights to) wishes, i.e. that the release wishes to use the images, sounds or any other rendering that is a result of the recording made of the releasor (or property owned by the releasor for which the releasor may claim some other right such as industrial design rights, trademark or trade dress rights). This will help in insuring the copyright owner has a clean chain of title for any work if it is later published, broadcast, shown in a public cinema or otherwise made public.

Releases are very often used to ensure that litigation is terminated when a settlement or compromise between the plaintiff(s) and defendant(s) is reached. A general release may release any claims known or unknown that the releasor may have against the releasee. The release may also be very specific, i.e. dealing with specific acts between the parties and not applying to any other acts.

Generally a release is of the form:

For good and valuable consideration, the receipt of which is hereby acknowledged, I, the releasor, release the releasee for any and all claims I may have against the releasee up to the date of the signing of this release [relating to or arising from _____________].

/signed/

However, most releases are much more detailed in the recitation of what is being released and the extent of the release (where it is valid, when it become valid if there are conditions on its validity, the amount of consideration if it is substantial) and they are either copied and modified as necessary from various form books or drafting manuals used by lawyers or are preprinted forms that are purchased from legal form publishers.

Releases should be drafted by a lawyer, solicitor or civil law notary (not in the United States), except perhaps in the most routine of situations; if the release is not correctly drafted or does not recite any necessary limitations the releasee may find out later that the release did not cover all circumstances, and the releasor may find that the release was too general and released some claim, right or entitlement that the releasor should have retained.

== Examples ==
- Current TV had a number of release forms for viewer created content.
- English Wikipedia provides a template for users wishing to release all rights to their images. Template:No rights reserved
- dpcorner.com, a longer model release form
