= Lionel Medeiros =

Portuguese footballer

Personal information
- Full name: Lionel Jesus Gonçalves Medeiros
- Date of birth: 14 April 1977 (age 49)
- Place of birth: Orléans, France
- Height: 1.86 m (6 ft 1 in)
- Position: Centre-back

Senior career*
Years	Team	Apps	(Gls)
1996–1998	Orléans		
1998–2002	Varzim	104	(0)
2002–2006	Vitória Guimarães	37	(1)
2006–2007	Académica	15	(0)
2007–2008	Omonia	0	(0)
2008–2009	APOP	5	(0)
Total		161	(1)
- * Club domestic league appearances and goals

Lionel Jesus Gonçalves Medeiros (born 14 April 1977 in Orléans, France) is a Portuguese retired footballer who played as a central defender. He is 186 cm (6 ft 1 in) tall.

== Career ==
In 2001, Medeiros debuted with Varzim Sport Club in Póvoa de Varzim, Portugal, and joined Vitória de Guimarães the following year. He remained with the team until the 2006-07 season, when he joined Associação Académica de Coimbra – Organismo Autónomo de Futebol in Coimbra, Portugal.
