= Abdelkarim Kissi =

Moroccan footballer

Personal information
- Date of birth: 5 May 1980 (age 46)
- Place of birth: Oujda, Morocco
- Height: 1.80 m (5 ft 11 in)
- Position: Midfielder

Senior career*
Years	Team	Apps	(Gls)
1998–2000	Mouloudia Oujda		
2000–2002	Maghreb de Fès		
2002–2004	Rubin Kazan	18	(0)
2004–2005	Litex Lovech	11	(1)
2006	Heerenveen	20	(0)
2007	Beroe Stara Zagora	8	(1)
2007–2008	Enosis Neon Paralimni	23	(2)
2008	Apollon Limassol	9	(0)
2009	AEK Larnaca	10	(0)
2009–2010	Ermis Aradippou	14	(0)
2010–2012	Ethnikos Achna	51	(1)
2013	Wydad de Fès		
2013	Mouloudia Oujda		
2014–2015	US Témara		

International career
2001–2008	Morocco	41	(0)
- * Club domestic league appearances and goals

Abdelkarim Kissi (Arabic: عبد الكريم قيسي; born 5 May 1980) is a Moroccan former professional footballer who played as a midfielder.

== Career ==
Kissi's former teams are Mouloudia Oujda, Maghreb Fez, Rubin Kazan, Litex Lovech, SC Heerenveen, Enosis Neon Paralimni and Apollon Limassol. From April 2007, he played for the Bulgarian club Beroe Stara Zagora.

== Trivia ==
Kissi was also part of the Moroccan national squad that took part in the Africa Cup of Nations in Ghana.
