= Demetris Daskalakis =

Greek-Cypriot footballer (born 1977)

Personal information
- Full name: Demetris Daskalakis
- Date of birth: November 18, 1977 (age 48)
- Place of birth: Athens, Greece
- Height: 1.85 m (6 ft 1 in)
- Position: Central defender

Senior career*
Years	Team	Apps	(Gls)
1999–2000	Ethnikos Assia	26	(1)
2000–2008	APOEL	132	(12)
2008	AEK Larnaca	6	(0)
2009	Ethnikos Asteras	14	(2)
2009–2010	Olympiakos Nicosia	23	(3)
2010–2011	PAEEK FC	14	(0)
2012–2013	Ergotelis	8	(0)
2013–2014	Ethnikos Latsion	21	(3)

International career^{‡}
2001–2008	Cyprus	11	(0)
- * Club domestic league appearances and goals as of June 13, 2011 ‡ National team caps and goals as of 22 August 2008

Demetris Daskalakis (Greek: Δημήτρης Δασκαλάκης) (born November 18, 1977, in Greece) is a Greek football defender who last played for Ergotelis. He also played for the national team of Cyprus. He had been a part of APOEL for eight years and won three championships (2002, 2004, 2007), two cups (2006, 2008) and two Super cups (2002, 2004). He was signed by AEK Larnaca on June 4, 2008. He then moved to Ethnikos Asteras and later returned to Cyprus to play for Olympiakos Nicosia. He has been reported to have been linked with a number of high-profile clubs, including Partizan Belgrade and Manchester City; however, there has been no reported interest from either.
