= Leonardo Oliveira =

Brazilian footballer (born 1978)

Personal information
- Full name: Leonardo Pereira de Oliveira
- Date of birth: 17 January 1978 (age 48)
- Place of birth: Campos dos Goytacazes, Brazil
- Height: 1.80 m (5 ft 11 in)
- Position: Defensive midfielder

Senior career*
Years	Team	Apps	(Gls)
1997–1998	América-RN		
1998–1999	União São João		
2000–2001	Mérida	53	(1)
2002–2003	União São João		
2003–2004	Juventud Unida		
2004	Istres	8	(0)
2004–2005	Servette	9	(0)
2005–2006	St. Gallen	15	(1)
2007–2008	Olympiakos Nicosia	13	(2)
2008–2009	AEP Paphos	5	(0)
2009	São Carlos		
2010	Americano	1	(0)
- * Club domestic league appearances and goals

Leonardo Pereira de Oliveira (born 17 January 1978) is a Brazilian former footballer who played as a midfielder. His clubs include AEP Paphos of Cyprus, Istres, Servette, St. Gallen and Olympiakos Nicosia.
