= Tiquinho (footballer, born 1985) =

Angolan footballer

Personal information
- Full name: Fábio André da Silva Ferraz
- Date of birth: 14 July 1985 (age 41)
- Place of birth: Sesimbra, Portugal
- Height: 1.73 m (5 ft 8 in)
- Position: Winger

Youth career
- 1996–1999: Sesimbra
- 1999–2004: Benfica

Senior career*
Years	Team	Apps	(Gls)
2004–2007	Marítimo B	46	(1)
2007–2008	AEL Limassol	31	(6)
2008	Anorthosis	0	(0)
2009	AEK Larnaca	10	(4)
2009–2010	AEP	17	(1)
2011	Alzira	14	(0)
2012	Interclube		
2013	Nacional Benguela		
2013–2014	Alfarim	4	(1)
2015–2016	Moura	6	(0)

International career
2001–2002	Portugal U17	10	(3)
2009–2011	Angola	2	(0)
- * Club domestic league appearances and goals as of 8 May 2016

Fábio André da Silva Ferraz (born 14 July 1985), commonly known as Tiquinho, is a Portuguese-Angolan professional footballer who plays as a right winger.

== Club career ==
Tiquinho was born in Sesimbra, Setúbal District. After unsuccessfully emerging through S.L. Benfica's youth system the 19-year-old signed for C.S. Marítimo but, during his three-year spell in Madeira, he played almost exclusively with the reserves in the third division, only being called to the first team's substitutes bench on two occasions.

In the summer of 2007, Tiquinho moved to Cyprus, going on to remain in the country for the following three years in representation of AEL Limassol, Anorthosis Famagusta FC – no official games – AEK Larnaca FC and AEP Paphos FC. He then went on to play in Spain, Angola and ended his career in Moura, which competes in Campeonato de Portugal, the third-level of Portuguese football.

Tiquinho is international for the academy teams of Portugal, and for the Angola national football team.
