= Eleftherios Eleftheriou =

Cypriot footballer (born 1974)

Elefthérios Eleftheríou
Personal information
- Date of birth: 12 June 1974 (age 52)
- Place of birth: Larnaca, Cyprus
- Height: 1.80 m (5 ft 11 in)
- Position: Attacking midfielder

Senior career*
Years	Team	Apps	(Gls)
1995–2005	AEK Larnaca	164	(51)
2005–2008	Enosis Neon Paralimni	61	(15)
2008–2009	Ethnikos Achnas	17	(2)
2009–2010	Alki Larnaca	23	(7)

International career^{‡}
2000–2002	Cyprus	15	(0)
- * Club domestic league appearances and goals as of July 2009 ‡ National team caps and goals as of July 2009

Elefthérios Eleftheríou (born 12 June 1974 in Larnaca, Cyprus) is a Cypriot football midfielder who played for Alki Larnaca. He also played for Enosis Neon Paralimni and AEK Larnaca.

== Honours ==
AEK Larnaca

- Cypriot Cup: 2003–04
