= Julián Kmet =

Argentine footballer

Personal information
- Full name: Julián Andrés Kmet
- Date of birth: 21 November 1977 (age 48)
- Place of birth: Lanús, Argentina
- Height: 1.80 m (5 ft 11 in)
- Position: Midfielder

Youth career
- Lanús

Senior career*
Years	Team	Apps	(Gls)
1997–1998	Lanús	36	(10)
1998–2000	Sporting CP	1	(0)
1999	→ Lanús (loan)	17	(2)
2000	→ Lanús (loan)	22	(1)
2001–2002	Nueva Chicago	33	(4)
2002	Estudiantes LP	13	(0)
2003	Newell's Old Boys	11	(0)
2004	Nueva Chicago	13	(1)
2004–2005	Gimnasia LP	16	(3)
2005	Argentinos Juniors	8	(0)
2005–2006	Gimnasia y Esgrima	21	(1)
2007–2008	Ferro Carril Oeste	41	(4)
2008–2009	APOP	1	(0)
Total		233	(26)
- * Club domestic league appearances and goals

Julián Andrés Kmet (born 21 November 1977) is an Argentine retired footballer who played as a midfielder.

He amassed Argentine Primera División totals of 190 games and 22 goals over 11 seasons, representing mainly Lanús.

== Club career ==
Born in Lanús, Buenos Aires Province of Ukrainian descent, Kmet scored a career-best ten goals in 36 Primera División games for local Club Atlético Lanús in the 1997–98 season, aged only 20. He was subsequently signed as a promising young talent by Sporting CP, but failed to adjust overall and, after two loans to his former club, left in early 2000 amidst accusations of discrimination.

From 2001 to late 2006, Kmet appeared for several teams in his country's top flight. After that, he signed with Club Ferro Carril Oeste of the Primera B Nacional, retiring at 31 after a few months in Cyprus with APOP Kinyras FC.

== Personal life ==
Born in Argentina, Kmet is of Paraguayan descent through his mother. He became a citizen of Paraguay. His son Luca plays for the Paraguay national under-20 football team.
