= Guilherme Weisheimer =

Brazilian footballer (born 1981)

Personal information
- Date of birth: October 22, 1981 (age 45)
- Place of birth: Porto Alegre, Brazil
- Height: 1.83 m (6 ft 0 in)
- Position: Forward

Senior career*
Years	Team	Apps	(Gls)
2000–2002	Grêmio	34	(8)
2003	Criciúma		
2003	SC Ulbra		
2005	SER Caxias		
2005	Veranópolis		
2005–2007	Aris Thessaloniki	14	(1)
2007–2008	AC Omonia	24	(9)
2008	Ethnikos Achna	13	(3)
2008	Atromitos Yeroskipou	19	(1)
2009	APOP Kinyras Peyias	13	(2)
2009–2010	Ermis Aradippou	24	(1)
2010–2011	Ahva Arraba	15	(6)
2011–2012	Maccabi Herzliya	35	(3)
2013	Novo Hamburgo	9	(1)
2014	União Frederiquense		
2014	São José		
2015	Esportivo		
2016	Panelefsiniakos	12	(1)
- * Club domestic league appearances and goals as of 01:20, 18 May 2011 (UTC)

Guilherme Weisheimer (born October 22, 1981) was a former Brazilian striker.

He began playing football for Gremio youth team from the age of 10. He played for first time to Gremio's senior team in 2000–01, playing at the same team with Ronaldinho. He played 34 games with Gremio, in championship and Cup, and scored 8 goals until December 2002. In January 2003 he was loan transferred to Criciúma Esporte Clube for 6 months. He returned in the summer of 2003 to his team Gremio, to be again loan transferred to Ulbra (3rd Division team) until December 2003.

In January 2005, he returned to his country to play for the teams Caxias and Veranopolis. One year later, in January 2006 he signed for the Greek club Aris Salonica, to be transferred twelve months later for AC Omonia.
