= Hamid Rhanem =

Moroccan footballer (born 1981)

Personal information
- Full name: Hamid Rhanem
- Date of birth: January 29, 1981 (age 45)
- Place of birth: Romorantin-Lanthenay, France
- Height: 1.83 m (6 ft 0 in)
- Position: Midfielder

Senior career*
Years	Team	Apps	(Gls)
2002–2003	C.D. Aves		
2003–2004	S.C. Salgueiros	33	(2)
2004–2005	Associação Naval 1º de Maio	23	(3)
2005–2006	Asteras Tripolis	17	(2)
2006–2007	Ayia Napa	15	(4)
2007	Enosis Neon Paralimni	8	(1)
2008	AEK Larnaca	18	(2)
2009	APOP Kinyras Peyias	12	(3)
2010	Digenis Akritas Morphou	8	(1)
2011	Nea Salamina	12	(1)
2012–2013	Blois		
2013–2014	Romorantin	2	(0)
2017–2018	Blois	2	(0)

International career^{‡}
- Morocco
- * Club domestic league appearances and goals ‡ National team caps and goals as of 21 January 2008

Hamid Rhanem (born January 29, 1981) is a French football midfielder. His former teams are AEK Larnaca, Enosis Neon Paralimni, Ayia Napa FC, Associação Naval 1º de Maio, S.C. Salgueiros, C.D. Aves and Nea Salamina.

== Honours ==
APOP Kinyras

- Cypriot Cup: 2008–09
