= Boris Bjelkanović =

Croatian footballer

Personal information
- Full name: Boris Bjelkanović
- Date of birth: 27 September 1984 (age 42)
- Place of birth: Banja Luka, SFR Yugoslavia
- Height: 1.95 m (6 ft 5 in)
- Position: Center back

Youth career
- Cres

Senior career*
Years	Team	Apps	(Gls)
2004-2006	Krk		
2006–2007	Kamen Ingrad	10	(0)
2007–2008	Bonifika	28	(10)
2008–2009	APEP	5	(0)
2009–2010	Atromitos	5	(1)
2009–2010	Celje	13	(1)
2010–2011	Pomorac	10	(1)
2011–2012	Honvéd	1	(0)
2011–2012	Honvéd II	23	(3)
2012–2013	Putnok	11	(0)
2013–2014	Lushnja	15	(1)
2014	Pomorac	5	(0)
2015	FC Rosengård	19	(0)
2016	BW 90	17	(4)
2017	Österlen FF	18	(2)
2018	Prespa Birlik	20	(1)
2019	Balkan	15	(1)
2020–2021	Malmö City	11	(0)
- * Club domestic league appearances and goals as of 15:12, 10 May 2020 (UTC)

Boris Bjelkanović (born 27 September 1984 in Banja Luka) is a Croatian football player who most recently played for Malmö City.
