= Kyriacos Chailis =

Cypriot football striker (born 1978)

Personal information
- Full name: Kyriacos Chailis
- Date of birth: 23 February 1978 (age 48)
- Place of birth: Famagusta, Cyprus
- Height: 1.80 m (5 ft 11 in)
- Position: Striker

Senior career*
Years	Team	Apps	(Gls)
1998–2000	Anorthosis	19	(3)
2000–2001	Digenis Morphou	23	(12)
2001–2003	Anorthosis	19	(4)
2003–2005	Digenis Morphou	49	(19)
2005–2007	Nea Salamina	48	(27)
2007–2008	AC Omonia	23	(6)
2008–2010	AEP Paphos	56	(14)
2010	Ermis Aradippou	10	(1)
2011	Nea Salamina	12	(3)
2011	Omonia Aradippou	12	(5)
2012	PAEEK FC	14	(5)
2012	Chalkanoras Idaliou	0	(0)

International career^{‡}
2007	Cyprus	1	(0)
- * Club domestic league appearances and goals as of May 2012 ‡ National team caps and goals as of December 03, 2007

Kyriacos Chailis (Greek: Κυριάκος Χαιλής; born February 23, 1978, in Famagusta) is a Cypriot football striker who recently released from Chalkanoras Idaliou.
