= Milan Belić =

Serbian football manager and player

Personal information
- Full name: Milan Belić
- Date of birth: 29 August 1977 (age 49)
- Place of birth: Odžaci, SFR Yugoslavia
- Height: 1.73 m (5 ft 8 in)
- Position: Striker

Youth career
- Vojvodina

Senior career*
Years	Team	Apps	(Gls)
1996–2002	Vojvodina	100	(29)
1996–1997	→ Solunac Karađorđevo (loan)		
2002	OFK Beograd	2	(0)
2002–2003	1. FC Nürnberg	7	(0)
2003–2005	Vojvodina	46	(16)
2005–2006	APOP Kinyras	18	(6)
2006–2007	Ethnikos Achna	22	(11)
2007–2008	Anorthosis	21	(2)
2008–2009	AEP Paphos	13	(0)
2009	AEK Larnaca	5	(1)
2009–2010	Ethnikos Achna	23	(2)
2010–2011	Nea Salamis		
2011	Radnički Sombor	14	(3)
2012	Anagennisi Deryneia	11	(0)
Total		282	(70)

Managerial career
- 2018–2019: Kabel
- 2019–2020: Bečej
- 2021–2022: Kabel
- * Club domestic league appearances and goals

Milan Belić (Serbian Cyrillic: Милан Белић; born 29 August 1977) is a Serbian football manager and former player.

== Club career ==
Born in Odžaci, Belić started out at Vojvodina in the mid-1990s, becoming a team captain and making 100 league appearances for the club. He subsequently moved to OFK Beograd in May 2002, appearing in just two games, before transferring to Bundesliga side 1. FC Nürnberg that summer.

After a year in Germany, Belić returned to his parent club Vojvodina in 2003. He spent another two seasons with the Lale, before moving abroad for the second time and joining Cypriot side APOP Kinyras. While playing for Anorthosis, Belić won the Cypriot First Division in the 2007–08 campaign.

== International career ==
In January 2001, Belić represented FR Yugoslavia at the Millennium Super Soccer Cup in India, as the team won the tournament. He made two (unofficial) appearances in the process.

== Managerial career ==
In July 2019, Belić was appointed as manager of Serbian League Vojvodina club Bečej. He resigned from his position in September 2020.

== Honours ==
Anorthosis

- Cypriot First Division: 2007–08
