= Luís Miguel (footballer, born 1979) =

Portuguese footballer

Personal information
- Full name: Luís Miguel da Costa Lobo
- Date of birth: 9 October 1979 (age 47)
- Place of birth: Guimarães, Portugal
- Height: 1.78 m (5 ft 10 in)
- Position: Forward

Youth career
- 1992–1994: Vitória Guimarães
- 1994–1996: Ribeira de Pena
- 1996–1998: Pevidém

Senior career*
Years	Team	Apps	(Gls)
1998–2000	Pevidém	34	(15)
2000–2001	Extremadura	0	(0)
2001–2002	Tirsense	7	(0)
2002	Caçadores Taipas	6	(0)
2003	Mirandela		
2003–2008	Madalena	66	(13)
2006	→ Moreirense (loan)	7	(1)
2008	APOP	10	(3)
2009	Enosis Neon	2	(1)
2009–2010	Gondomar	11	(2)
2010–2011	Académico Viseu	8	(1)
2011–2012	Terras de Bouro	4	(1)
2012–2013	Torcatense	13	(2)
Total		168	(39)
- * Club domestic league appearances and goals

Luís Miguel da Costa Lobo (born 9 October 1979), known as Luís Miguel, is a Portuguese retired footballer who played mainly as a forward.

== Club career ==
Born in Guimarães, Luís Miguel spent his entire career in Portugal with modest teams: Pevidém SC, F.C. Tirsense, Clube Caçadores das Taipas, SC Mirandela, F.C. da Madalena, Moreirense FC, Gondomar S.C. and Académico de Viseu FC. In his country, he never competed in higher than the third division.

Miguel also played in Spain with CF Extremadura (only represented the reserves), and Cyprus (APOP Kinyras FC, Enosis Neon Paralimni FC). On 26 October 2004, whilst at the service of Madalena, he scored a hat-trick against Primeira Liga club U.D. Leiria in a Taça de Portugal tie, but in a 3–4 home defeat.
