= Ronny van Es =

Dutch footballer (born 1978)

Ron van Es
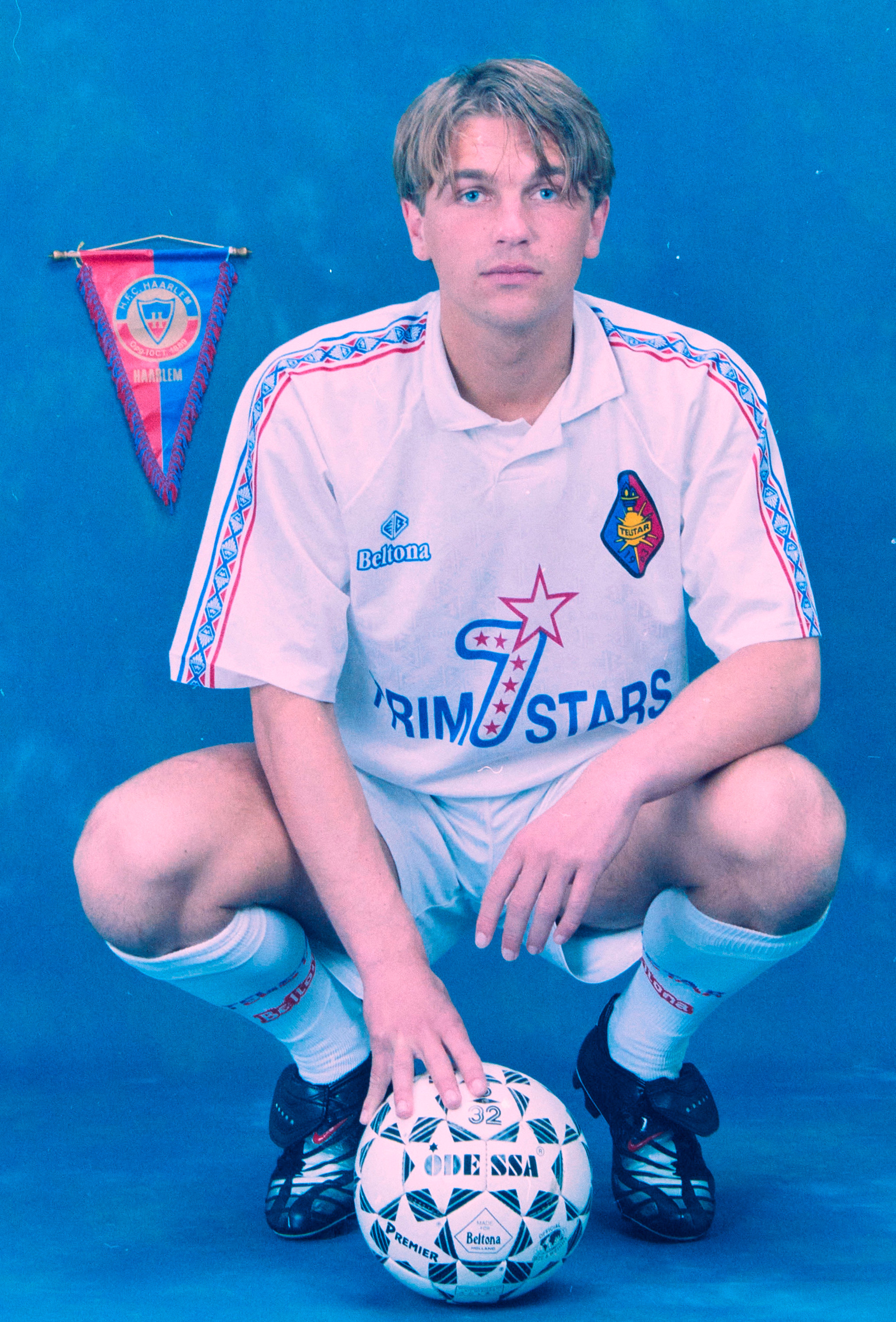

Personal information
- Full name: Ronald van Es
- Date of birth: May 22, 1978 (age 48)
- Place of birth: Velsen, Netherlands
- Height: 1.80 m (5 ft 11 in)
- Position: Striker

Senior career*
Years	Team	Apps	(Gls)
1996–2000	Telstar	104	(17)
2000–2002	Haarlem	38	(5)
2002–2004	Rio Ave	57	(15)
2004	Maia		
2004–2007	Stormvogels Telstar	77	(12)
2007–2008	Panthrakikos	21	(10)
2008	AEP Paphos	1	(0)
2009	Doxa Drama	10	(3)
2009–2013	AFC	65	(17)
- * Club domestic league appearances and goals

Ronny van Es (born 22 May 1978 in Velsen, Netherlands) is a Dutch retired footballer.

== Club career ==
After his Portuguese adventure Van Es returned to his former club Stormvogels Telstar in 2004/2005. He went on a new foreign adventure in July 2007, when he signed a one-year contract at Greek second tier club Panthrakikos with an option for another year. He made a good 2007–08 season helping his Greek club to promote. Despite the successes, he signed a new 2-year contract at Cypriot side AEP Paphos until 2010. On January 10, 2009 however he signed a contract and moved to Greek outfit Doxa Drama. He left after a half year Doxa Drama of Greece and signed in the Netherlands with Topklasse team AFC.

== Player agent ==
He retired in 2013 to become a player agent, representing doping suspect Kevin van Essen among others.
