= Eric Ejiofor =

Nigerian footballer

Personal information
- Date of birth: 17 December 1979 (age 46)
- Place of birth: Asaba, Delta, Nigeria
- Height: 1.81 m (5 ft 11 in)
- Position: Defender

Youth career
- 1994–1995: Asaba United
- 1995–1998: Katsina United

Senior career*
Years	Team	Apps	(Gls)
1998	Katsina United		
1999	Shooting Stars F.C.		
1999–2002	Enyimba		
2002–2004	Maccabi Haifa	36	(1)
2004–2005	F.C. Ashdod	32	(1)
2005–2009	Enosis Neon Paralimni	75	(1)

International career
2000–2002	Nigeria	14	(0)
- * Club domestic league appearances and goals

Eric Ejiofor (born 17 December 1979) is a Nigerian former professional footballer who played as a defender.

== Club career ==
Ejiofor played for Asaba United and Katsina United during his youth career, making his senior debut with Katsina United in 1998. He subsequently played for Shooting Stars and Enyimba, gaining experience in the Nigerian league.

In 2002, he moved to Israel to join Maccabi Haifa, where he remained until 2004. During the 2003–04 season, he helped the club win the Israeli Premier League. In 2004, he transferred to Ashdod, where he played for one season.

In 2005, he joined Enosis Neon Paralimni in Cyprus, playing in the Cypriot First Division until 2009. He subsequently retired from professional football.

== International career ==
Ejiofor represented the Nigerian national team from 2000 to 2002, making 14 appearances and scoring no goals.

He represented Nigeria at the 2002 Africa Cup of Nations, held in Mali. In the same year, he was also included in Nigeria's squad for the 2002 FIFA World Cup, co-hosted by South Korea and Japan.

== Honours ==
Maccabi Haifa

- Israeli Premier League: 2003–04
