= Rui Andrade (footballer) =

Portuguese footballer (born 1977)

Personal information
- Full name: Rui Miguel Rodrigues Pereira de Andrade
- Date of birth: 6 December 1977 (age 48)
- Place of birth: Lisbon, Portugal
- Height: 1.74 m (5 ft 8 1/2 in)
- Position: Midfielder

Youth career
- 1987–1988: GD Chelas
- 1991–1992: Palmense
- 1992–1996: Oriental

Senior career*
| Years | Team | Apps | (Gls) |
| 1996–1999 | Oriental | 19 | (0) |
| 1999–2000 | Fanhões | | |
| 2000–2001 | Oriental | 35 | (7) |
| 2001–2002 | Operário | 33 | (1) |
| 2002–2003 | Olhanense | 32 | (1) |
| 2003–2004 | Covilhã | 31 | (2) |
| 2004–2005 | Marco | 19 | (0) |
| 2005 | Pinhalnovense | 9 | (0) |
| 2006–2007 | Atlético | 36 | (3) |
| 2007 | Mafra | 10 | (0) |
| 2008 | Doxa | 18 | (0) |
| 2008 | Ermis | 5 | (0) |
| 2009–2010 | Atromitos | 17 | (0) |
| 2010–2011 | Charneca Caparica | | |
| Total | | 264 | (14) |
- * Club domestic league appearances and goals

Rui Miguel Rodrigues Pereira de Andrade (born 6 December 1977 in Lisbon) is a Portuguese retired footballer who played as a midfielder.
