= Demetris Leoni =

Cypriot footballer (born 1977)

Personal information
- Full name: Demetris Leoni
- Date of birth: January 13, 1977 (age 49)
- Place of birth: Limassol, Cyprus
- Height: 1.85 m (6 ft 1 in)
- Position: Goalkeeper

Team information
- Current team: Karmiotissa Polemidion (goalkeeping coach)

Senior career*
Years	Team	Apps	(Gls)
1994–2004	AEL	138	(0)
2004–2008	Omonia	35	(0)
2008	AE Paphos	9	(0)
2009	Anorthosis	0	(0)
2009–2010	Alki	44	(0)
2011–2013	APEP	42	(0)
2013–2014	Ayia Napa	21	(0)
2014–2015	Pafos FC	8	(0)
2015–2017	ENY Digenis Ypsona	39	(0)

International career
2000–2001	Cyprus	2	(0)

Managerial career
- 2018–: Omonia (goalkeeping coach)
- * Club domestic league appearances and goals as of 10 October 2014

Demetris Leoni (Greek: Δημήτρης Λεωνή; born January 13, 1977, in Limassol, Cyprus) is a Cypriot retired goalkeeper and goalkeeping coach of Omonia. He also played for AEL Limassol, Omonia, AEP, Alki Larnaca and APEP.
