= 2008–09 Enosis Neon Paralimni F.C. season =

Enosis Neon Paralimni
2008–09 season
- Chairman: (Cyprus) Adamos Loizou
- Manager: (Cyprus) Marios Constantinou (Bulgaria) Eduard Eranosyan
- Top goalscorer: League: 4 Goals: Freddy; All: 6 Goals: Freddy
- Highest home attendance: 3,500 vs Omonia (1 September 2008)
- Lowest home attendance: 800 vs Atromitos (25 October 2008)

The 2008–09 season (started 9 July 2008) is Enosis' 40th consecutive season in the Cypriot First Division. The team finished 6th in the league in the previous season. The first training session for the season took place at the training ground at Paralimni Municipal Stadium on 9 July 2008. Manager Marios Constantinou resigned the club in December 2008 due to the club's consecutive bad results of the team in the Cypriot First Division, and was replaced by Eduard Eranosyan.

== Current squad ==
Last Update: 31 December 2008 Note: Flags indicate national team as defined under FIFA eligibility rules; some limited exceptions apply. Players may hold more than one non-FIFA nationality.

No.	Pos.	Nation	Player
1	GK	MKD	Petar Miloševski
2	DF	GHA	Koffi Amponsah
3	DF	ENG	Michael Felgate
4	DF	CYP	Marios Karas
5	DF	SLO	Bekim Kapič
6	MF	POR	Hugo Faria
7	DF	VEN	Raúl González
8	DF	ARG	Javier Menghini
10	MF	BRA	Edmar
11	FW	CYP	Giorgos Nicolaou
14	MF	POR	Alhandra

No.	Pos.	Nation	Player
16	MF	IRL	Matthew Cassidy
17	MF	CYP	Demos Goumenos (captain)
19	FW	CYP	Giorgos Kolokoudias
20	GK	ARM	Armen Ambartsumyan
21	MF	CYP	Georgios Kolanis
25	FW	GRE	Alekos Kaklamanos
30	MF	CYP	Eleftherios Mertakas
31	FW	POR	Luís Miguel
33	DF	CYP	Panayiotis Spyrou
50	MF	NGR	Blessing Kaku
TBD	FW	CYP	Stefanos Voskaridis

=== Transfers 2008/09 ===
In Note: Flags indicate national team as defined under FIFA eligibility rules; some limited exceptions apply. Players may hold more than one non-FIFA nationality.

No.	Pos.	Nation	Player
—	DF	VEN	Raúl González (Signed from Doxa Katokopias)
—	MF	POR	Alhandra (Signed from U.D. Leiria)
—	MF	IRL	Matt Cassidy (Signed Sfrom Bolton Wanderers F.C.)
—	GK	ARM	Armen Ambartsumyan (Signed from Doxa Katokopias)
—	DF	ARG	Javier Menghini (Signed from Corporación Deportiva Everton de Viña del Mar)
—	FW	CYP	Giorgos Nicolaou (Signed from Nea Salamina)
—	FW	GRE	Alekos Kaklamanos (Signed from Kerkyra)
—	DF	GHA	Koffi Amponsah (Signed from Apollon Kalamarias)
—	MF	POR	Hugo Faria (Signed from U.D. Leiria)
—	FW	CYP	Georgios Kolokoudias (Signed from Panserraikos F.C.)

Out Note: Flags indicate national team as defined under FIFA eligibility rules; some limited exceptions apply. Players may hold more than one non-FIFA nationality.

No.	Pos.	Nation	Player
—	MF	CYP	Eleftherios Eleftheriou (Signed to Ethnikos Achna)
—	FW	CYP	Costas Elia (Signed to Alki Larnaca)
—	DF	SLO	Almir Tanjič (Signed to AEP Paphos)
—	MF	BRA	Paquito (Signed to FC Lucerne)
—	MF	NGR	Eric Ejiofor (Signed to Alki Larnaca)
—	MF	MKD	Igor Jančevski (Released)
—	MF	SRB	Pavle Popara (Signed to PFC Slavia Sofia)
—	MF	CYP	Adamos Efstathiou (Signed to Digenis Morphou)
—	MF	MAR	Abdelkarim Kissi (Signed to Apollon Limassol)
—	DF	SUI	Henri Siqueira (Signed to AC Bellinzona)
—	FW	CYP	Demetris Christofi (Signed to AC Omonia)
—	GK	GRE	Vassilis Mitilinaios (Signed to Panachaiki)

=== Winter Period ===
In: Note: Flags indicate national team as defined under FIFA eligibility rules; some limited exceptions apply. Players may hold more than one non-FIFA nationality.

No.	Pos.	Nation	Player
—	MF	NGR	Blessing Kaku (Signed from Maccabi Petah Tikva)
—	FW	POR	Luís Miguel (Signed from APOP Kinyras Peyias)
—	FW	CYP	Stefanos Voskaridis (On loan from Anorthosis FC)

Out: Note: Flags indicate national team as defined under FIFA eligibility rules; some limited exceptions apply. Players may hold more than one non-FIFA nationality.

No.	Pos.	Nation	Player
—	MF	ANG	Freddy (Signed to AEL Limassol)
—	MF	CPV	Puma (Released)
—	MF	CPV	Néné (Released)
—	MF	COD	Jeff Tutuana (Released)

=== Captains ===
1. (Cyprus) Demos Goumenos
2. (Cyprus) Marios Karas
3. (Cyprus) Panayiotis Spyrou

Source: enpfc.com

=== Foreign players ===
Teams in the Cypriot First Division can register up to eighteen non-EU nationals and players with European ancestry.

EU Nationals

- (Armenia) (Bulgaria) (European Union) Armen Ambartsumyan
- (England) (European Union) Michael Felgate
- (Greece) (European Union) Alekos Kaklamanos
- (Republic of Ireland) (European Union) Matthew Cassidy
- (North Macedonia) (European Union) Petar Miloševski
- (Portugal) (European Union) Alhandra
- (Portugal) (European Union) Hugo Faria
- (Portugal) (European Union) Luís Miguel
- (Slovenia) (European Union) Bekim Kapič

EU Nationals (Dual citizenship)

- (Brazil) (Spain) Edmar
- (Nigeria) (Belgium) Blessing Kaku
- (Venezuela) (Italy) Raúl González

Non-EU Nationals

- (Argentina) Javier Menghini
- (Ghana) Koffi Amponsah

=== International players ===
- (Cyprus) Marios Karas
- (Cyprus) Giorgos Nicolaou
- (Cyprus) Demos Goumenos
- (Cyprus) Panayiotis Spyrou
- (Armenia) Armen Ambartsumyan
- (Ghana) Koffi Amponsah
- (North Macedonia) Petar Miloševski
- (Nigeria) Blessing Kaku

== Club ==
=== Management ===
Position	Staff
Manager	(Bulgaria) (Armenia) Eduard Eranosyan
Assistant manager	
Fitness coach	(Cyprus) Giorgos Georgiou
Goalkeeping coach	(Cyprus) Giorgos Frangou
Team doctor	(Cyprus) Costas Constantinou

Last updated: 9 Jul 2008
Source: enpfc.com

=== Kit ===
Supplier: Lotto
Sponsor(s): Elian Developers

Home	Away	Third colours

Source: enpfc.com

=== Other information ===
Chairman	(Cyprus) Adamos Loizou
Ground (capacity and dimensions)	Paralimni Municipal Stadium (9,782 / 105x70 m)

Source: enpfc.com

== Pre-season matches and friendlies ==
Enosis left on 23 July for Pravets, Bulgaria to perform most of their pre-season training. The team returned on 4 August. While in Bulgaria Enosis played three friendly matches.

2008-07-26

(Israel) Hapoel Ra'anana	1 – 2	(Cyprus) Enosis
19'	(Report)	Kaklamanos 37', Nicolaou 77'

Pravets, Bulgaria

2008-07-30

(Bulgaria) PFC Litex Lovech	3 – 4	(Cyprus) Enosis
(pen) 23', 75', 90+'	(Report)	Goumenos 4' 59', Kaklamanos 66', Pieretis 89'

Pravets, Bulgaria
Attendance: 500

2008-08-02

(Bulgaria) Levski Sofia	2 – 0	(Cyprus) Enosis
Ivanov (pen) 7', Ognyanov 44'	(Report)

Georgi Asparuhov Stadium, Sofia, Bulgaria
Attendance: 500

2008-08-05

(Cyprus) Enosis	2 – 0	(Cyprus) Onisilos
Freddy 59', 79'	(Report)

Paralimni Stadium, Paralimni
Attendance: 200

2008-08-09

(Cyprus) Enosis	1 – 3	(Cyprus) AEP
Kaklamanos 6'	(Report)	Lukman 27', Ba 36', Chailis (pen) 45'

Paralimni Stadium, Paralimni

2008-08-09

(Cyprus) Enosis	1 – 0	(Cyprus) PAEEK FC
Nicolaou 4'	(Report)

Paralimni Stadium, Paralimni

2008-08-12

(Cyprus) Enosis	1 – 0	(Cyprus) Alki
Goumenos 81'	(Report)

Paralimni Stadium, Paralimni
Attendance: 300

2008-08-17

(Cyprus) Enosis	1 – 1	(Cyprus) Ethnikos Achnas
Faria 20'	(Report)	Janković 37'

Paralimni Stadium, Paralimni

2008-08-20

(Cyprus) Enosis	1 – 0	(Cyprus) Atromitos
Spyrou 78'	(Report)

Paralimni Stadium, Paralimni

2008-08-22

(Cyprus) Enosis	3 – 1	(Cyprus) Ayia Napa
Karas 20', Freddy 37', Nicolaou 85'	(Report)	Yiannakou (pen) 87'

Paralimni Stadium, Paralimni

2008-08-24

(Cyprus) Apollon	2 – 1	(Cyprus) Enosis
Garpozis (pen) 27', Okkarides 85'	(Report)	Freddy 65'

Tsirion Stadium, Limassol

2008-09-05

(Cyprus) Enosis	0 – 0	(Cyprus) Anorthosis

Paralimni Municipal Stadium, Paralimni

2008-10-10

(Cyprus) Anorthosis	1 – 0	(Cyprus) Enosis
Nicolaou (pen)

Antonis Papadopoulos Stadium, Larnaca

== Competitions ==
=== Marfin Laiki League ===
==== Classification ====
Pos	Team	Pld	W	D	L	GF	GA	GD	Pts	Qualification or relegation
8	Doxa Katokopias	26	8	7	11	37	39	−2	31	Qualification for second round, Group B
9	AEP Paphos	26	5	12	9	30	38	−8	27	Qualification for second round, Group C
10	Enosis Neon Paralimni	26	6	7	13	23	43	−20	25	Qualification for second round, Group C
11	APEP	26	5	8	13	28	44	−16	23	Qualification for second round, Group C
12	Alki Larnaca	26	4	7	15	27	50	−23	19	Qualification for second round, Group C

Source: cfa.com.cy (in Greek)
Rules for classification: 1) points; 2) head-to-head points; 3) head-to-head goal difference; 4) head-to-head goals scored; 5) goal difference; 6) number of goals scored.
Teams qualified for Group A played out one spot in the second qualifying round of the UEFA Champions League and two spots in the UEFA Europa League, one in the second and one in the first qualifying round.
A spot in the third qualifying round of UEFA Europa League was awarded to the winners of the 2008–09 Cypriot Cup.
Teams qualified for Group C played out one additional relegation spot.
Points gained in the First round were taken over into the Second round groups.

==== Results summary ====
Overall								Home						Away					
Pld	W	D	L	GF	GA	GD	Pts	W	D	L	GF	GA	GD	W	D	L	GF	GA	GD
16	4	4	8	15	30	−15	16	2	2	4	6	13	−7	2	2	4	9	17	−8

Last updated: January 4, 2009.
Source: soccerway.com

==== Results by round ====
Round	1	2	3	4	5	6	7	8	9	10	11	12	13	14	15	16	17	18	19	20	21	22	23	24	25	26	27	28	29	30	31	32
Ground	H	A	H	H	A	H	A	H	A	H	A	H	A	A	H	A																
Result	L	W	W	D	L	W	L	L	D	D	L	L	W	L	L	D																

Updated to match(es) played on January 3, 2009. Source:
A = Away; H = Home; W = Win; D = Draw; L = Loss

==== Playoffs table ====
Pos	Team	Pld	W	D	L	GF	GA	GD	Pts	Qualification or relegation
9	AEP Paphos	32	7	15	10	39	44	−5	36	
10	Enosis Neon Paralimni	32	8	8	16	27	51	−24	32	
11	APEP	32	7	10	15	33	51	−18	31	
12	Alki Larnaca (R)	32	6	9	17	39	59	−20	27	Relegation to Cypriot Second Division

Source: cfa.com.cy (in Greek)
Rules for classification: 1) points; 2) head-to-head points; 3) head-to-head goal difference; 4) head-to-head goals scored; 5) goal difference; 6) number of goals scored.
(R) Relegated

==== Matches ====
Time at EET

2008-09-01
19:00

Enosis	0 – 2	AC Omonia
	(report)	Duro (pen.) 15'; Okkas (pen.) 29'

Paralimni Stadium, Paralimni
Attendance: 4.000
Referee: Marios Tsangaris

2008-09-13
19:00

APOP Kinyras	1 – 3	Enosis
Vargas (pen.) 39'	(report)	Freddy 7' 9'; Kaklamanos 37'

Peyia Municipal Stadium, Peyia
Attendance: 1.800
Referee: Leontios Trattos

2008-09-20
19:00

Enosis	2 – 1	AEK
Freddy 19'; Spyrou 84'	(report)	Abraham 88'

Paralimni Stadium, Paralimni
Attendance: 1.000
Referee: Demetris Chrystostomou

2008-09-27
19:00

Enosis	1 – 1	Alki
Freddy (pen.) 63'	(report)	Silva 66'

Paralimni Stadium, Paralimni
Attendance: 1.270
Referee: Stelios Trifonos

2008-10-18
19:00

Apollon	4 – 0	Enosis
Sangoy G. 6' 14'; Babangida 80'; Solomou 90+3'	(report)

Tsirion Stadium, Limassol
Attendance: 5.800
Referee: Marios Stamatis

2008-10-25
18:00

Enosis	1 – 0	Atromitos
H. Faria 35'	(report)

Paralimni Stadium, Paralimni
Attendance: 800
Referee: Leontios Trattos

2008-11-01
19:00

APOEL	1 – 0	Enosis
Onwuachi 11'	(report)

GSP Stadium, Nicosia
Attendance: 5.608
Referee: Leontios Trattos

2008-11-09
17:00

Enosis	0 – 3	Anorthosis
	(report)	Sosin 70'; Hawar M. 74' (pen.) 84'

Paralimni Stadium, Paralimni
Attendance: 3.400
Referee: Demetris Chrysostomou

2008-11-15
14:30

APEP	0 – 0	Enosis
	(report)

Tsirion Stadium, Limassol
Attendance: 675
Referee: Christos Nicolaides

2008-11-23
17:00

Enosis	1 – 1	Doxa
Kaklamanos 84'	(report)	Nuno 4'

Paralimni Stadium, Paralimni
Attendance: 954
Referee: Yiannakis Ioannou

2008-11-29
15:30

Ethnikos	0 – 0	Enosis
Lars 16'; Yiasemakis 76'	(report)	Goumenos 52'

Dasaki Stadium, Achna
Attendance: 279
Referee: Costas Kapitanis

2008-12-07
17:00

Enosis	0 – 3	AEL
	(report)	Pulpo 23'; Krassas 77'; Teophanous 85'

Paralimni Stadium, Paralimni
Attendance: 900
Referee: Giannis Anastasiou

2008-12-13
15:30

AEP	0 – 2	Enosis
	(report)	Kolokoudias 14'; Edmar 44'; Amponsah (red card) 65'

Pafiako Stadium, Paphos
Attendance: 1.500
Referee: Panikos Kailis

2008-12-22
19:00

Omonia	7 – 1	Enosis
Alabi 5'; Kaiafas 18'; Cafú 20'; Duro 70'; Karas 49' (o.g.); Aloneftis 85' (pen.); Christofi 88'	(report)	Goumenos 31'

GSP Stadium, Nicosia
Attendance: 6.672
Referee: Leontios Trattos

2008-12-28
14:30

Enosis	1 – 2	APOP Kinyras
Kaku 26' (pen.)	(report)	Vargas 7' (pen.); Buyse 68'

Paralimni Stadium, Paralimni
Referee: Christos Nicolaides

2009-01-03
18:00

AEK	2 – 2	Enosis
Tiquinho 38' 71'	(report)	Kaklamanos 69'; Luís Miguel 88'

GSZ Stadium, Larnaca
Attendance: 914
Referee: Marios Panagi

2009-01-11
18:00

Alki	–	Enosis

Ammochostos Stadium, Larnaca
Referee:

=== Cypriot Cup ===
==== First Round ====
2008-09-24
16:00

Halkanoras	2 – 3	Enosis
Pauli 28' Neofytou 78'	(report)	Freddy 13', 84'; Kaklamanos 75'

Dhali Municipal Stadium, Dhali
Attendance: 300
2008-10-04
16:00

Enosis	0 – 0	Halkanoras

Paralimni Stadium, Paralimni
