= Armen Ambartsumyan =

Armen Ambartsumyan may refer to:

- Armen Ambartsumyan (footballer, born 1978), Bulgarian-Armenian football goalkeeper
- Armen Ambartsumyan (footballer, born 1994), Russian-Armenian footballer
