= Giorgos Nicolaou =

Cypriot footballer (born 1982)

Personal information
- Full name: Giorgos Nicolaou
- Date of birth: 22 May 1982 (age 44)
- Place of birth: Paralimni, Cyprus
- Height: 1.81 m (5 ft 11 in)
- Position: Striker

Team information
- Current team: Ormideia
- Number: 11

Youth career
- Enosis Neon Paralimni

Senior career*
Years	Team	Apps	(Gls)
1999–2004	Enosis Neon Paralimni	68	(12)
2004–2005	AC Omonia	18	(5)
2005–2006	Panachaiki	13	(5)
2006–2007	Olympiakos Nicosia	23	(9)
2007–2008	Nea Salamina	17	(3)
2008–2009	Enosis Neon Paralimni	9	(0)
2009–2010	Ayia Napa F.C.	21	(2)
2010–	Ormideia	25	(24)

International career^{‡}
2004–2006	Cyprus	5	(0)
- * Club domestic league appearances and goals as of July 2009 ‡ National team caps and goals as of July 2009

Giorgos Nicolaou (Greek: Γιώργος Νικολάου) born 22 May 1982 in Paralimni, Cyprus is a Cypriot football striker who currently plays for Ormideia F.C. He started his career at Enosis Neon Paralimni and he also played for Panachaiki AC Omonia, Olympiakos Nicosia and Nea Salamina.
