= Demos Goumenos =

Cypriot footballer (born 1978)

Personal information
- Full name: Demosthenis Goumenos
- Date of birth: 25 December 1978 (age 47)
- Place of birth: Paralimni, Cyprus
- Height: 1.80 m (5 ft 11 in)
- Position: Midfielder

Team information
- Current team: Enosis Neon Paralimniou
- Number: 17

Youth career
- Enosis Neon Paralimni

Senior career*
| Years | Team | Apps | (Gls) |
| 1997–2011 | Enosis Neon Paralimniou | 287 | (37) |
| 2011–2012 | Ermis Aradippou | 19 | (0) |
| 2012–2013 | Enosis Neon Paralimniou | 20 | (0) |
| 2013–2014 | Ayia Napa | 27 | (5) |
| 2014–2015 | Enosis Neon Paralimniou | 3 | (1) |

International career^{‡}
| 2004–2005 | Cyprus | 4 | (0) |
- * Club domestic league appearances and goals as of 13 August 2014 ‡ National team caps and goals as of July 2009

Demos Goumenos (born 25 December 1978 in Paralimni, Cyprus) is a Cypriot football midfielder who played for Ayia Napa. He has been the captain of Enosis for many years.
