= Javier Menghini =

Argentine footballer

Personal information
- Full name: Javier Damián Menghini
- Date of birth: 27 February 1980 (age 46)
- Place of birth: La Plata, Argentina
- Height: 1.82 m (6 ft 0 in)
- Position: Centre back

Youth career
- Estudiantes LP

Senior career*
Years	Team	Apps	(Gls)
2001–2004	Estudiantes LP	3	(0)
2002–2003	→ Defensa y Justicia (loan)		
2004–2005	Godoy Cruz	18	(0)
2005–2008	Everton	97	(8)
2008–2009	Enosis Neon Paralimni	27	(1)
2009–2010	Alki Larnaca	29	(1)
2010–2011	Defensa y Justicia	25	(1)
2012–2014	Villa San Carlos	43	(0)
- * Club domestic league appearances and goals as of 23 August 2018

Javier Menghini (born 27 February 1980 in La Plata, Argentina) is a retired Argentine footballer who played as defender.

== Playing career ==
=== Club ===
Everton

- Primera División de Chile (1): 2008 Apertura

Alki Larnaca

- Cypriot Second Division (1): 2009–10

Villa San Carlos

- Primera B Metropolitana (1): 2012–13
