= Michael Felgate =

English footballer

Personal information
- Full name: Michael Peter Felgate
- Date of birth: 1 April 1991 (age 35)
- Place of birth: Eastbourne, England
- Position: Defender

Senior career*
Years	Team	Apps	(Gls)
2008–2010	Enosis Neon Paralimni	7	(0)
2009–2010	→ Alki Larnaca (loan)		
2010–2016	Ayia Napa	83	(5)
2016–2017	Enosis Neon Paralimni	17	(0)
2017–2019	Anagennisi Deryneia	48	(3)
2019–2020	ASIL Lysi	11	(1)
2020–2021	Digenis Akritas Morphou	20	(0)
2021–2023	Anagennisi Deryneia	48	(5)
- * Club domestic league appearances and goals

Michael Peter Felgate (born 1 April 1991) is an English footballer who plays as a defender.

== Career ==
On 2 September 2012, Felgate made his debut for Ayia Napa in the Cypriot First Division, playing the full match in a 5-0 loss to Omonia Nicosia.

Ahead of the 2019/20 season, Felgate joined ASIL Lysi. He joined Digenis Akritas Morphou for the 2020-21 season before returning to Anagennisi Deryneia.

== Personal life ==
Felgate lived in England before moving to Cyprus at a young age. He has expressed a desire to represent the Cyprus national football team.
