= Alexandros Kaklamanos =

Greek footballer (born 1974)

Alekos Kaklamanos
Personal information
- Full name: Alexandros Kaklamanos
- Date of birth: 20 May 1974 (age 52)
- Place of birth: Rhodes, Greece
- Height: 1.87 m (6 ft 2 in)
- Position: Striker

Senior career*
Years	Team	Apps	(Gls)
1993–1995	Ialysos	56	(17)
1995–1997	Olympiacos	32	(6)
1997–1998	Athinaikos	31	(3)
1998–1999	Panelefsiniakos	26	(7)
1999–2000	Charleroi	20	(6)
2000–2003	Gent	84	(40)
2003–2005	Standard Liège	34	(8)
2005–2006	APOEL	20	(3)
2006–2007	Ergotelis	14	(2)
2007–2008	Kerkyra	29	(12)
2008–2009	Enosis Neon Paralimni	18	(3)
2009–2011	Rodos	59	(16)
2011–2012	R.U. Saint-Gilloise	29	(7)
2012–2013	Kleanthis Paradeisi		
2013	Thrasyvoulos	11	(0)
2014–2015	Peramaikos	12	(4)
2015–2020	Kleovoulos Lindos	125	(75)
2020–2022	Diagoras Vati		
2022–2023	Kleovoulos Lindos		
- * Club domestic league appearances and goals

Alexandros Kaklamanos (Greek: Αλέξανδρος Κακλαμάνος; born 20 May 1974) is a former Greek footballer who played as a striker.

== Club career ==
He played in many teams such as Ialysos, Olympiacos, Athinaikos, Panelefsiniakos, Charleroi, Gent, Standard Liège, APOEL, Ergotelis, Kerkyra, Enosis Neon Paralimni and Rodos For the season 2011–2012, he was signed by R.U. Saint-Gilloise. He also has played for Kleanthis Paradeisiou, Peramaikos and Thrasyvoulos.
