= Bekim Kapić =

Slovenian footballer (born 1979)

Personal information
- Full name: Bekim Kapić
- Date of birth: 2 January 1979 (age 47)
- Place of birth: Ljubljana, SFR Yugoslavia
- Height: 1.85 m (6 ft 1 in)
- Position: Defender

Senior career*
| Years | Team | Apps | (Gls) |
| 1999–2001 | Livar | 22 | (0) |
| 2001–2003 | Koper | 54 | (2) |
| 2003–2005 | Mura | 51 | (4) |
| 2005–2009 | Enosis Neon Paralimni | 97 | (1) |
| 2009–2010 | Ayia Napa | 20 | (1) |
| 2010–2012 | Celje | 36 | (0) |
| 2012–2014 | Szeged 2011 | 40 | (2) |

International career^{‡}
| 2002 | Slovenia | 1 | (0) |
- * Club domestic league appearances and goals ‡ National team caps and goals as of 9 December 2009

Bekim Kapić (born 2 January 1979) is a retired Slovenian football defender.

He has been capped for the Slovenian national team once, against China in February 2002.
