= Panayiotis Spyrou =

Cypriot footballer (born 1976)

Panikos Spyrou
Personal information
- Full name: Panayiotis Spyrou
- Date of birth: October 17, 1976 (age 50)
- Place of birth: Nicosia, Cyprus
- Height: 1.83 m (6 ft 0 in)
- Position: Defender

Senior career*
Years	Team	Apps	(Gls)
1997–2000	Enosis Neon Paralimni	29	(2)
1998–1999	→ Anorthosis Famagusta (on loan)	14	(0)
1999–2000	APOEL	22	(0)
2000–2002	Alki Larnaca	20	(2)
2003-2004	→ Apollon Limassol (on loan)	12	(0)
2002–2005	Olympiakos Nicosia	53	(3)
2005–2011	Enosis Neon Paralimni	138	(5)
2012	Anagennisi Dherynia	11	(0)
Total		299	(12)

International career^{‡}
2002–2003	Cyprus	11	(0)
- * Club domestic league appearances and goals as of January 2012 ‡ National team caps and goals as of July 2009

Panayiotis Spyrou (Greek: Παναγιώτης (Πανίκκος) Σπύρου) born October 17, 1976, in Nicosia, Cyprus is a Cypriot football defender who last played for Anagennisi Dherynia. His former teams are Alki Larnaca, Olympiakos Nicosia, APOEL and Enosis Neon Paralimni where he spent most of his playing years.
