= Raúl González (footballer, born 1985) =

Venezuelan footballer

Raúl Gonzalez
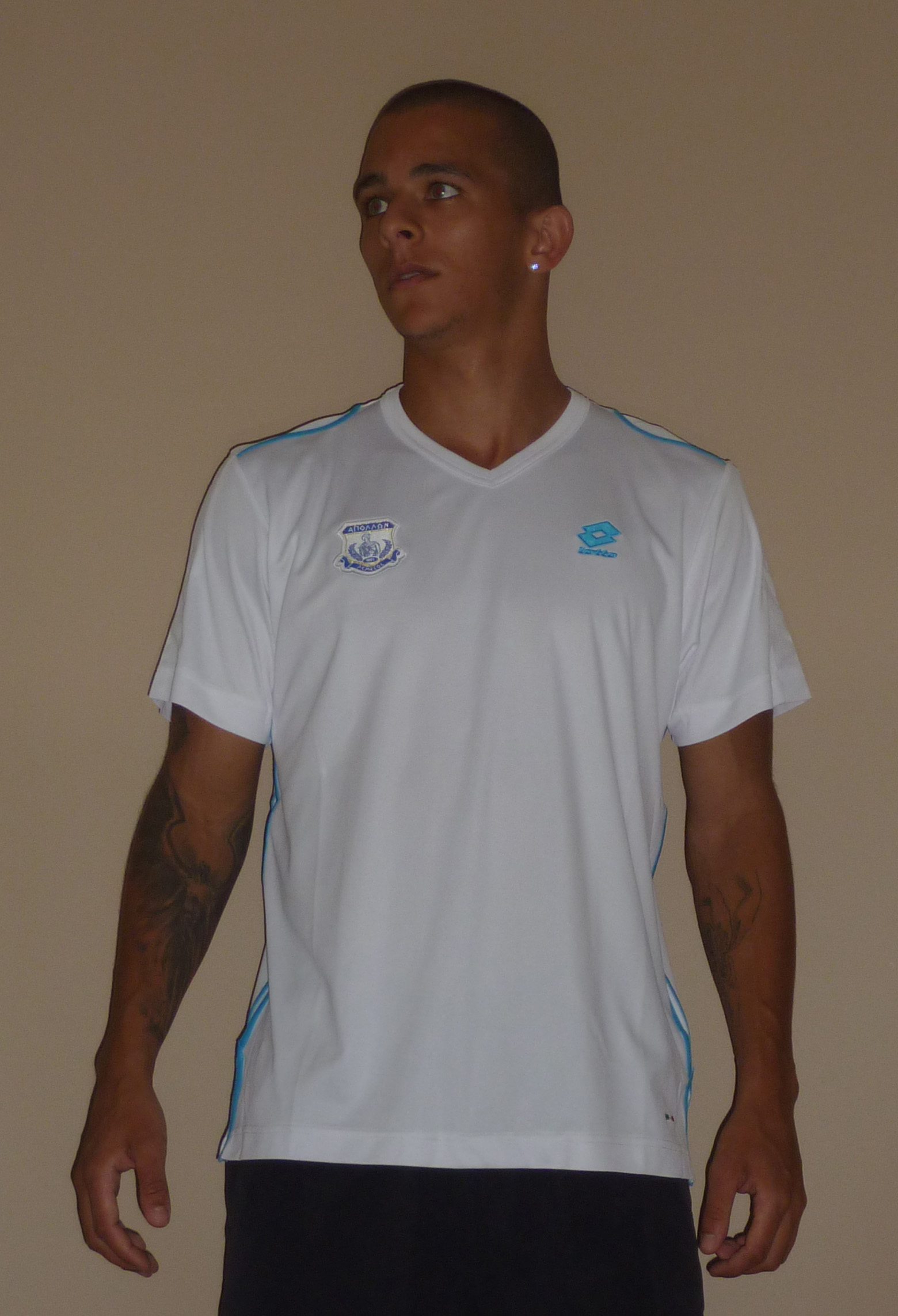

Personal information
- Full name: Raúl Eduardo González Guzmán
- Date of birth: 28 June 1985 (age 41)
- Place of birth: Valencia, Venezuela
- Height: 1.72 m (5 ft 7 1/2 in)
- Positions: Right-back; right winger

Senior career*
Years	Team	Apps	(Gls)
2002–2005	Deportivo Italchacao		
2005	Aragua	12	(0)
2006–2007	Caracas	28	(1)
2007	Portuguesa	14	(0)
2007–2008	Doxa Katokopia	28	(0)
2008–2010	Enosis Neon Paralimni	41	(2)
2010–2011	Apollon Limassol	19	(0)
2011–2012	Anagennisi Dherynia	10	(0)
2012	Carabobo	8	(0)
2012–2014	GKS Bełchatów	24	(0)
2013–2014	GKS Bełchatów II	7	(1)
2014–2015	Dóxa Katokopia	29	(0)
2015–2016	Rozwój Katowice	27	(0)
2016–2017	P.O. Xylotymbou	28	(2)
2017–2019	Ayia Napa	50	(1)
2019–2020	ASIL Lysi	18	(0)
2020–2021	Oroklini-Troulloi	19	(1)
2022–2023	Alki Oroklini	9	(0)

International career
2011	Venezuela	1	(0)
- * Club domestic league appearances and goals as of 28 June 2024

Raúl Eduardo González Guzmán (born 28 June 1985), known as "El Pollo", is a Venezuelan professional footballer.

This right-footed player plays preferably as right winger, but his good defense means that he also can be used as right back. He is the youngest brother of Héctor González, also a known Venezuelan footballer.

== Club career ==
He formed almost integrally in the Social Center Ítalo Venezuelan of the city of Valencia. He debuted with the first team of the Deportivo Italchacao in 2002, participating even in Copa Libertadores. In 2004 received the call to form part of the Youthful National Selection that would participate in the 22a, edition of the South American Championship Under-20 "Youth of America" Colombia 2005, where Venezuela advanced to the final round and occupied the sixth position.

In 2005, he joined Aragua FC, where he made 12 league appearances. In January 2006, he signed with the Caracas FC, one of the successful and largest teams of the country, where he won his first silweare, the 2005 league title.. In January 2007, González moved to Portuguesea FC. That same year, he joined Doxa Katokopia, a Cypriot club recently promoted to the Cypriot First Division. A year later, González moved to fellow Cypriot top-flight club Enosis Neon Paralimni. In 2010, he joined Apollon Limassol.

Ahead of the 2019–20 season, González joined ASIL Lysi.
