= Alhandra (footballer) =

Portuguese footballer

Personal information
- Full name: Luís Miguel Assunção Joaquim
- Date of birth: 5 March 1979 (age 47)
- Place of birth: Vila Franca de Xira, Portugal
- Height: 1.70 m (5 ft 7 in)
- Position: Left-back

Youth career
- 1987–1989: Alhandra
- 1989–1998: Sporting CP

Senior career*
Years	Team	Apps	(Gls)
1998–1999	Sporting CP	0	(0)
1998–1999	→ Lourinhanense (loan)	27	(4)
1999–2000	Alverca	2	(0)
2000–2001	Porto B	15	(3)
2001–2002	Académica	43	(7)
2002–2008	União Leiria	133	(5)
2008–2009	Enosis Neon	23	(1)
2009–2010	Gil Vicente	3	(0)
2010–2011	Eléctrico	10	(0)
2011	Monsanto	1	(0)
2012	Riachense	2	(0)
Total		259	(20)

International career
1998–1999	Portugal U20	16	(2)
2000–2002	Portugal U21	15	(0)
- * Club domestic league appearances and goals

Luís Miguel Assunção Joaquim (born 5 March 1979), known as Alhandra, is a Portuguese former professional footballer who played mainly as a left-back. He could also appear as a midfielder.

== Club career ==
Alhandra was born in Vila Franca de Xira, Lisbon District. An unsuccessful graduate of Sporting CP's youth academy, he started professionally with its farm team, S.C. Lourinhanense. After a brief spell with FC Porto's reserves he lived his most steady period with U.D. Leiria, helping the side to participations in the UEFA Intertoto Cup and being regularly used over the course of six Primeira Liga seasons (a maximum of 30 league games in 2005–06 and a minimum of 16 in 2007–08, with the latter campaign ending in relegation).

On 2 April 2008, Alhandra signed a two-year contract with Enosis Neon Paralimni FC, adding to the massive Portuguese contingent at the Cypriot club. He returned to Portugal after one sole season, joining Segunda Liga team Gil Vicente F.C. and being released at the end of the campaign.

Subsequently, Alhandra resumed his career in the lower leagues of his country, retiring in 2012 at the age of 33.
