= Edmar (footballer, born 1982) =

Brazilian footballer

Personal information
- Full name: Edmar Lacerda da Silva
- Date of birth: April 19, 1982
- Place of birth: Minas Gerais, Brazil
- Height: 1.75 m (5 ft 9 in)
- Position: Defender

Team information
- Current team: 1º de Dezembro

Senior career*
Years	Team	Apps	(Gls)
2003–2005	Ceuta	?	(?)
2005–2006	Atlético CP	66	(13)
2006–2007	→O. & M. (loan)	1	(0)
2007	Atlético CP	13	(3)
2007	Doxa Katokopias	16	(4)
2008–2010	Enosis Neon Paralimni	51	(6)
2010–2011	Alki Larnaca	27	(3)
2011–2015	AEL Limassol	108	(9)
2015–2017	Doxa Katokopias	59	(5)
2017–2018	Karmiotissa	24	(2)
2018–	1º de Dezembro	50	(0)
- * Club domestic league appearances and goals as of 13 February 2019

Edmar Lacerda da Silva or simply Edmar (19 April 1982) is a Brazilian defender who plays for 1º de Dezembro.
