= Vassilis Mytilinaios =

Greek footballer

Vassilis Mytilinaios (Greek: Βασίλης Μυτιληναίος; born 7 March 1982, in Genk, Belgium) is a Greek football goalkeeper.

He played for Akratitos, Apollon Smyrnis, Ionikos, Alki Larnaca, ENTHOI Lakatamia and since 2006 has played for Enosis Neon Paralimni in Cyprus.

Mytilinaios made one appearance for Apollon Smyrnis during the 2002–03 Beta Ethniki season.
