= Matthew Cassidy =

English footballer

Personal information
- Full name: Matthew Stephen Cassidy
- Date of birth: 2 October 1988 (age 38)
- Place of birth: Blackpool, England
- Position: Midfielder

Team information
- Current team: A.F.C. Blackpool

Youth career
- 2004–2005: Bolton Wanderers

Senior career*
Years	Team	Apps	(Gls)
2005–2008	Bolton Wanderers	1	(0)
2009–2010	Enosis Neon Paralimni	32	(0)
2010–2011	AEL Limassol	1	(0)
2011–2012	Othellos	24	(0)
2012–2013	Hyde United	18	(0)
2017–	A.F.C. Blackpool	0	(0)

International career^{‡}
2003–2004	Republic of Ireland U17	2	(0)
2004–2005	Republic of Ireland U18	3	(0)
2005–2007	Republic of Ireland U19	6	(0)
- * Club domestic league appearances and goals as of 17:31, 22 April 2013 (UTC) ‡ National team caps and goals as of 6 August 2008

Matthew Stephen Cassidy (born 2 October 1988) is a footballer who plays for A.F.C. Blackpool as a midfielder.

== Club career ==
=== Early career ===
Born in Blackpool, he started his career playing for Bolton Wanderers Youth and Reserve sides from the 2005–06 to the 2007–08 season and was named Academy Player of the Year in 2007.He also played for the Liverpool Dream Team of the late 90s In the summer of 2007 he made his first team debut for Bolton in a defeat to Hibernian.

=== Leaving for Cyprus ===
After leaving Bolton in the summer of 2008, he was offered contracts at a number of English clubs including Doncaster Rovers and Luton Town, but Cassidy turned down these offers to accept a contract at Cypriot First Division club Enosis Neon Paralimni. after being impressed with the set up there. in the Cypriot First Division with Enosis Neon Paralimni. He was Ireland's first ever footballing export to Cyprus.

He made his debut for the Cypriot club on 29 August 2009, in his side's 3–0 defeat to Apollon Limassol, coming on as a second-half substitute. On 6 December 2009, he made his first start for the club in a 2–0 win over APEP. After one year with Enosi Neon Paralimniou he left the club having made a total of 17 appearances scoring no goals. After leaving Enosis, Cassidy moved to one of the biggest clubs of the island of Cyprus, AEL Limassol. Cassidy signed a five-year contract with the club on 9 June 2010. He made his debut, coming on as a 70th-minute substitute in their 2–1 defeat to AEK Larnaca. But after just the one appearance, he left the club for Othellos, serving just one year with of his five-year contract.

=== Return to England ===
On 10 August 2012, he returned to England and signed for Conference National newcomers Hyde. He made his debut for the club in their 2–1 home defeat to Luton Town on 17 August 2012. He left before the end of the season.

In July 2017 Cassidy signed for A.F.C. Blackpool.

== International career ==
He has represented the Republic of Ireland at U17, U18 and U19 youth levels. In 2006 and 2007, Cassidy played in multiple games during Ireland's qualification tournament for the 2006 UEFA under-19 Championships.
