= Armen Ambartsumyan (footballer, born 1978) =

Bulgarian-Armenian footballer

Personal information
- Date of birth: 18 February 1978 (age 48)
- Place of birth: Plovdiv, Bulgaria
- Height: 1.87 m (6 ft 1 1/2 in)
- Position: Goalkeeper

Youth career
- 1990–1996: Sokol Komatevo

Senior career*
Years	Team	Apps	(Gls)
1997–1998	Maritsa Plovdiv	21	(0)
1998–2001	Botev Plovdiv	70	(1)
2001–2003	Marek Dupnitsa	53	(0)
2003–2007	Slavia Sofia	63	(1)
2007–2008	Doxa Katokopia	6	(0)
2008–2010	Enosis Neon	9	(0)
2010–2012	Botev Plovdiv	23	(0)
Total		236	(2)

International career
2002–2004	Armenia	8	(0)

Managerial career
- 2012–2017: Beroe (Goalkeeping coach)
- 2016–2019: Bulgaria (Goalkeeping coach)
- 2019–2020: Levski Sofia (Goalkeeping coach)
- * Club domestic league appearances and goals as of 18 May 2010

Armen Ambartsumyan (Armenian: Արմեն Համբարձումյան; Bulgarian: Армен Амбарцумян; born 18 February 1978 in Plovdiv, Bulgaria) is a former Bulgarian-Armenian football goalkeeper.

He was a member of the Armenia national team, and has participated in 8 international matches since his debut in away friendly match against Andorra on 7 June 2002.

== National team statistics ==
Armenia national team
Year	Apps	Goals
2002	1	0
2003	1	0
2004	6	0
Total	8	0
