= Marios Karas =

Cypriot footballer (born 1974)

Personal information
- Full name: Marios Karas
- Date of birth: October 24, 1974 (age 52)
- Place of birth: Famagusta, Cyprus
- Height: 1.85 m (6 ft 1 in)
- Position: Defender

Youth career
- Enosis Neon Paralimni

Senior career*
Years	Team	Apps	(Gls)
1992–2009	Enosis Neon Paralimni	213	(10)
2009–2011	Agia Napa		

International career^{‡}
1997–2000	Cyprus	4	(0)

Managerial career
- 2020: Enosis Neon Paralimni
- * Club domestic league appearances and goals as of December 2020 ‡ National team caps and goals as of December 2020

Marios Karas (born October 24, 1974) is a Cypriot retired football defender. He last played for Agia Napa after many years at Enosis Neon Paralimni. He was appointed as assistant manager at Enosis Neon Paralimni in 2012 after retiring as a player and currently serves as caretaker manager.
