= Paralimni =

Paralimni: Παραλίμνι (Greek); Paralimni (Turkish)
- Town and Municipal District
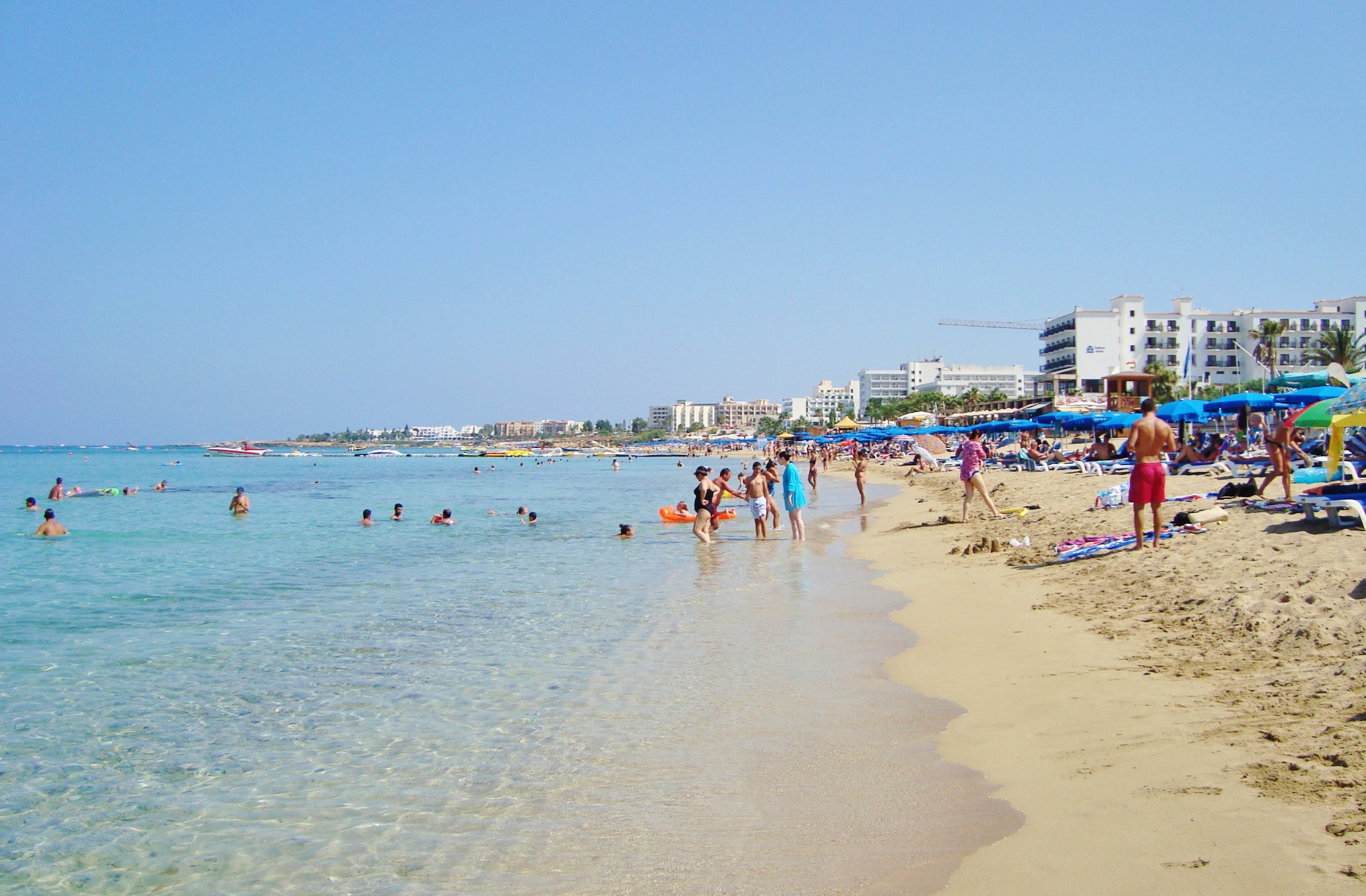
- Paralimni's Protaras resort in July 2011

- Location in Cyprus
- Coordinates: 35°2′0″N 33°59′0″E
- Country: Cyprus
- District: Famagusta District
- Municipality: Paralimni–Deryneia

Government
  - Deputy Mayor: Kleanthis Koutsoftas

Population (2011)
  - Total: 40,000
- Time zone: UTC+2 (EET)
  - Summer (DST): UTC+3 (EEST)
- Postal code: 5280-5297

Paralimni (Greek: Παραλίμνι; Turkish: Paralimni) is a town and municipal district of Paralimni–Deryneia Municipality in the Famagusta District of Cyprus. The town's population in 2011 was 15,000. Since the 1974 Turkish invasion of Cyprus, it has increased in size and status, primarily due to refugees fleeing from Northern Cyprus. It is the main commuter town for people working in the tourist sectors of nearby Ayia Napa and Protaras. It is also the temporary administrative center of the Famagusta District.

== Overview ==
Paralimni is located in southeast Cyprus. It is 110 km east of the capital city Nicosia. It was traditionally a suburb of Famagusta, just 10 km to the north, until the Turkish occupation of the town. It is near the Mediterranean coast, about 80 m above sea level. The town is located at the southeast end of the island's central plateau Mesaoria, which is why the plain extends around the town in the north and the coastal hills rise to the south.

== History ==
The word Paralimni is Greek and means "by the lake". The town is built on the shores of a shallow lake, which fills with water in the winter (the only time it experiences rainfall) and dries up at every other time of year. At the beginning of the 20th century, the whole lakebed was reclaimed for agricultural purposes. Paralimni has not always been where it is now; it was originally built on a hill between Deryneia and its present location. In the 15th century, it was moved inland to avoid detection by pirates. It is said that the first people to settle in Paralimni arrived just after the capture of the nearby town of Famagusta by the Ottoman Turks in 1571. The first settlement was called Saint Demetrius, and this place still bears his name today.

In 1986, after a referendum, the area was declared a municipality with the name Paralimni. In May, the first elections were held for the office of mayor and municipal council; Nikos Vlittis was elected the first mayor, and served from 1986 to 2006. In December 2006, he lost the election to Andreas Evaggelou, who served as mayor until 2011. The town is a stronghold for the Democratic Rally. Architecturally, Paralimni has been undistinguished, as very little remains of the original village. Outside of the town centre, most houses are little more than small rectangular blocks; their main selling points are their attractive gardens, especially when the trees are in bloom. Younger generations who earn higher salaries have been spending larger amounts of money on the construction of more modern and attractive houses in the town.

The town square of Paralimni hosts a large church and numerous cafes, bars, and shops. Since it has rapidly grown in size, Cyprus' largest food retailers like Carrefour have built or rented branches there. Many local supermarkets are also present. The countryside surrounding Paralimni has red soil rich in zinc, which is famous for producing very nutritious potatoes. It is also known for its picturesque windmills, which are used to draw water from underground aquifers to irrigate the surrounding land. Many of these windmills are now derelict, having been replaced by electric or diesel-powered pumps. Before the rise of tourism, the rich agricultural land surrounding Paralimni was the source of its wealth, and is still of great importance today.

The town is home to the football team Enosis Neon Paralimni FC and the basketball team Enosis Neon Paralimni BC. Paralimni's lake is home to the Cyprus grass snake, which was declared extinct in the 1960s until being rediscovered in 1994. As a result, the lake was designated a Site of Community Interest (SCI). The nearby tourist resort Protaras comes under the administrative jurisdiction of Paralimni.

== Climate ==
Climate data for Paralimni
Month	Jan	Feb	Mar	Apr	May	Jun	Jul	Aug	Sep	Oct	Nov	Dec	Year
Mean daily maximum °C (°F)	16.0 (60.8)	16.1 (61.0)	18.7 (65.7)	22.2 (72.0)	26.8 (80.2)	30.8 (87.4)	33.1 (91.6)	33.3 (91.9)	31.2 (88.2)	27.7 (81.9)	21.7 (71.1)	17.3 (63.1)	24.6 (76.3)
Daily mean °C (°F)	12.3 (54.1)	12.0 (53.6)	14.2 (57.6)	17.4 (63.3)	21.8 (71.2)	25.7 (78.3)	28.2 (82.8)	28.5 (83.3)	26.1 (79.0)	22.8 (73.0)	17.6 (63.7)	13.7 (56.7)	20.0 (68.0)
Mean daily minimum °C (°F)	8.6 (47.5)	7.9 (46.2)	9.7 (49.5)	12.5 (54.5)	16.8 (62.2)	20.6 (69.1)	23.4 (74.1)	23.7 (74.7)	20.9 (69.6)	18.0 (64.4)	13.4 (56.1)	10.1 (50.2)	15.5 (59.9)
Average precipitation mm (inches)	70.0 (2.76)	62.0 (2.44)	35.0 (1.38)	15.0 (0.59)	7.50 (0.30)	2.50 (0.10)	0.50 (0.02)	0.30 (0.01)	1.20 (0.05)	25.0 (0.98)	45.0 (1.77)	87.0 (3.43)	351.0 (13.82)
Average precipitation days (≥ 1 mm)	8.2	5.6	4.7	3.5	1.2	0.3	0.1	0.1	0.6	2.5	4.9	7.3	38.9
Source: Meteorological Service (Cyprus)

== Notable people ==
- Eleanna Christinaki, basketball player
- Michalis Konstantinou, footballer
- Tasos Markou, EOKA soldier, went missing in action during the Turkish invasion of Cyprus
- Solomos Solomou, killed by a Turkish officer at the UN Buffer Zone in 1996

== Gallery ==
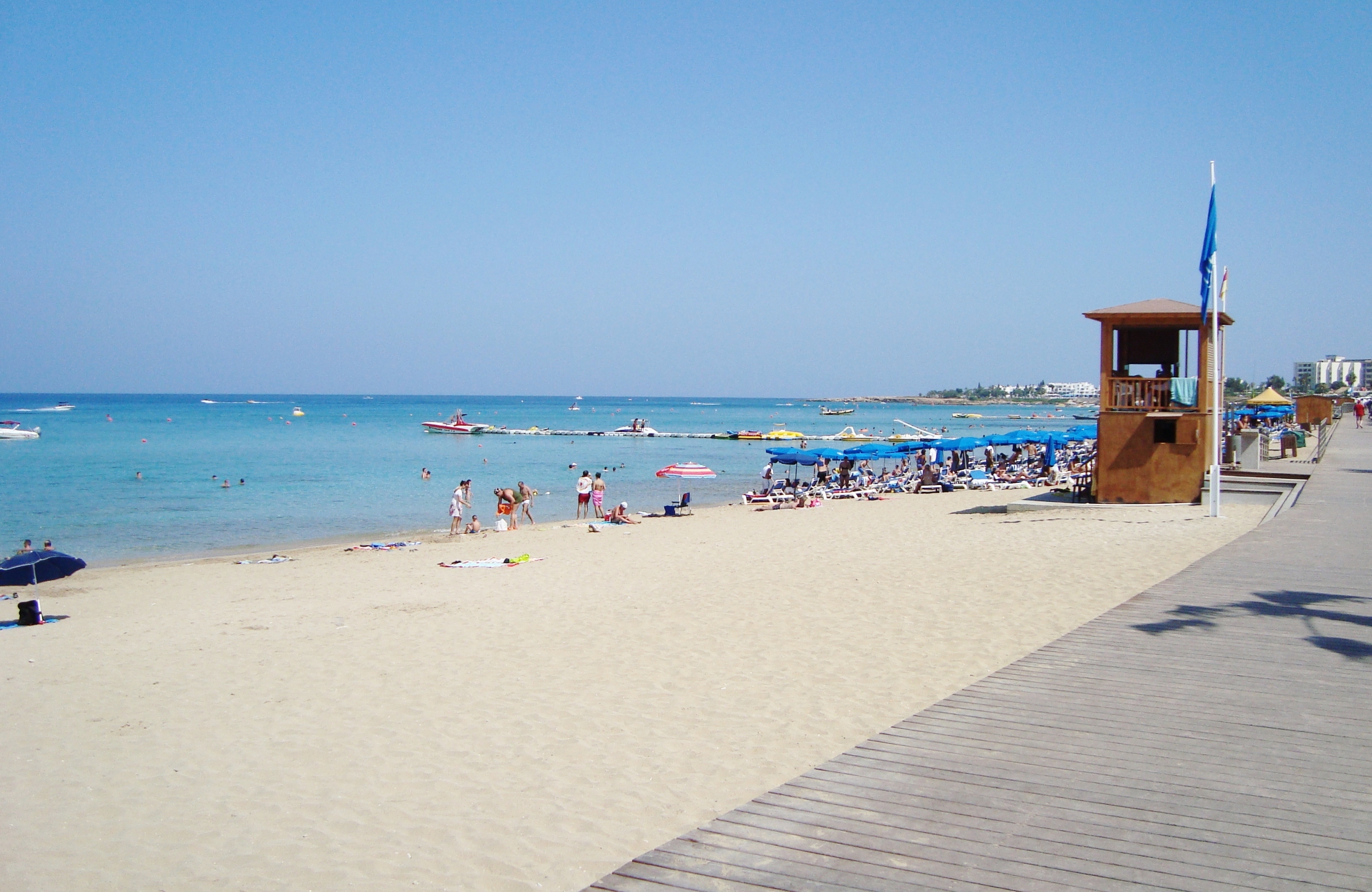
A Protaras beach in summer

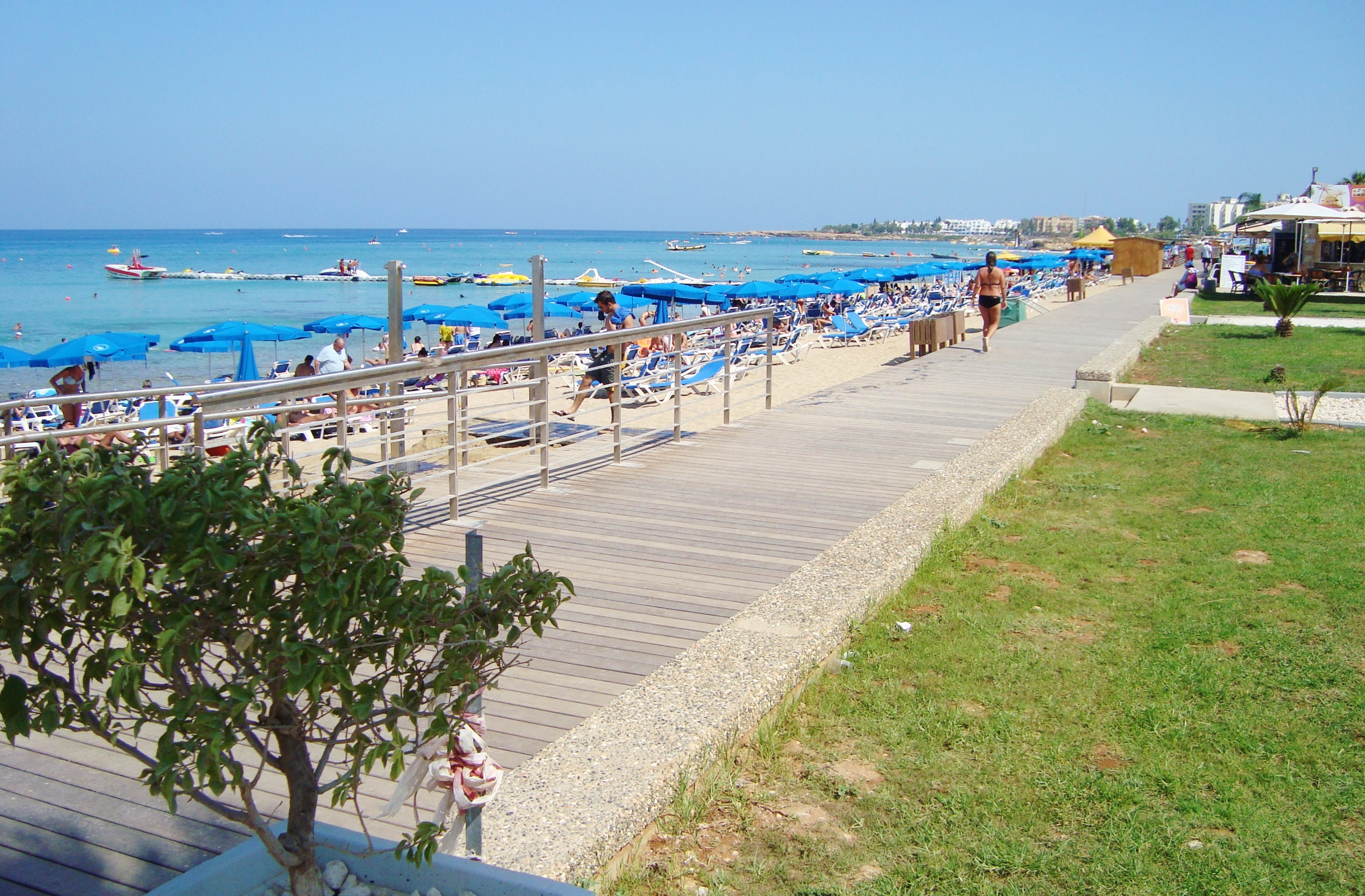
A wooden pedestrian road beside the beach

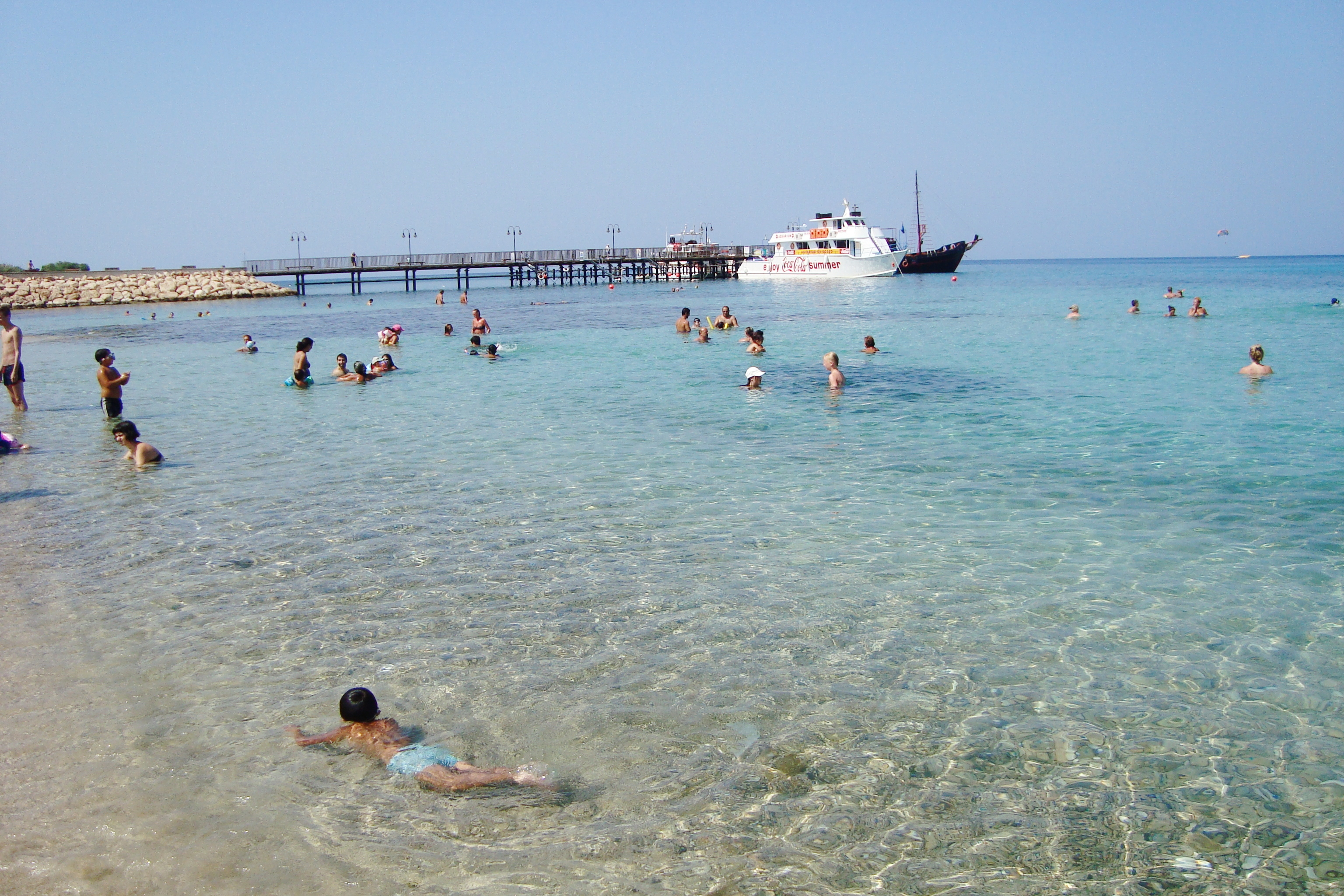
The promenade next to the beach

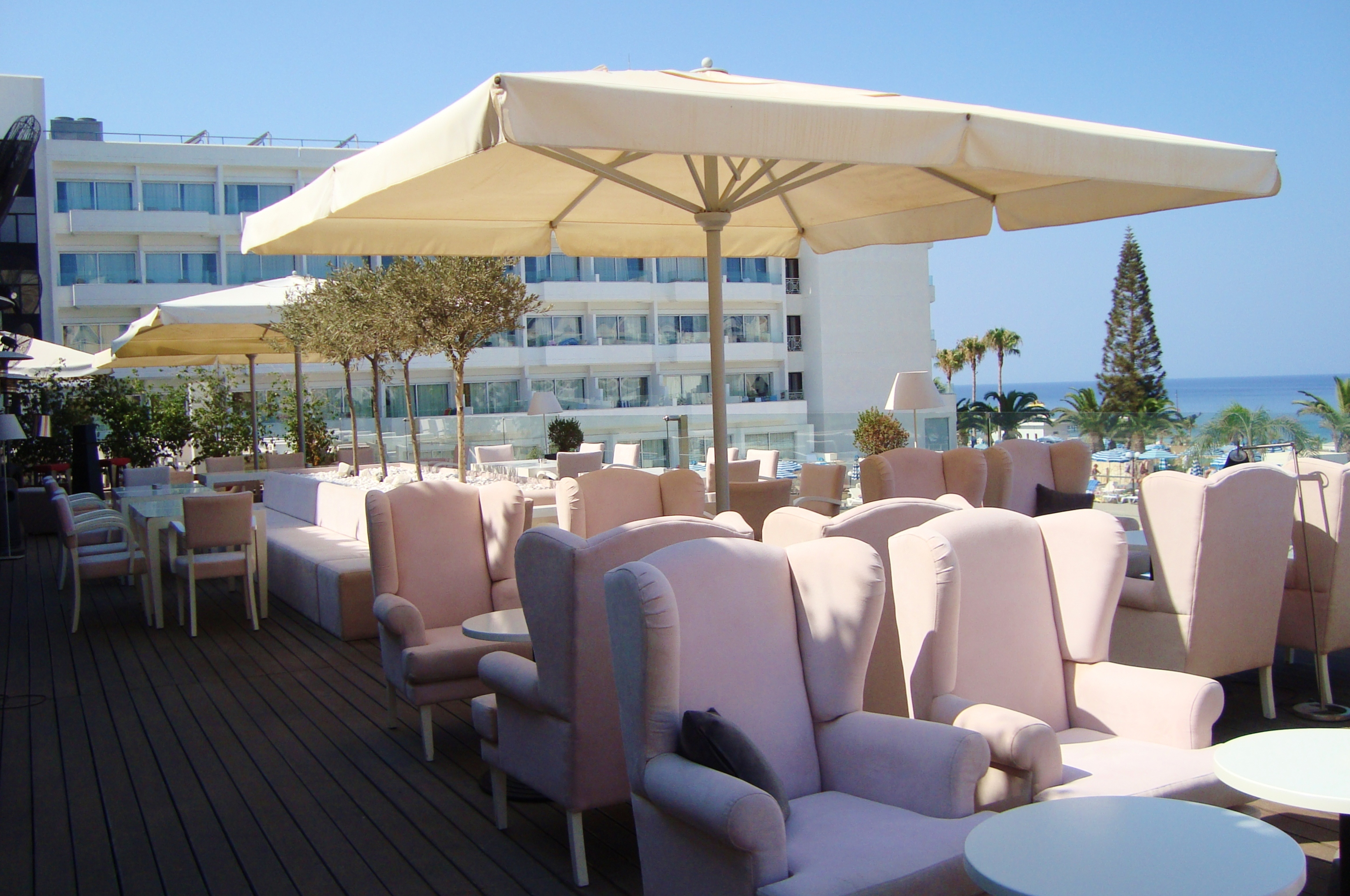
A cafe with a view of the beach

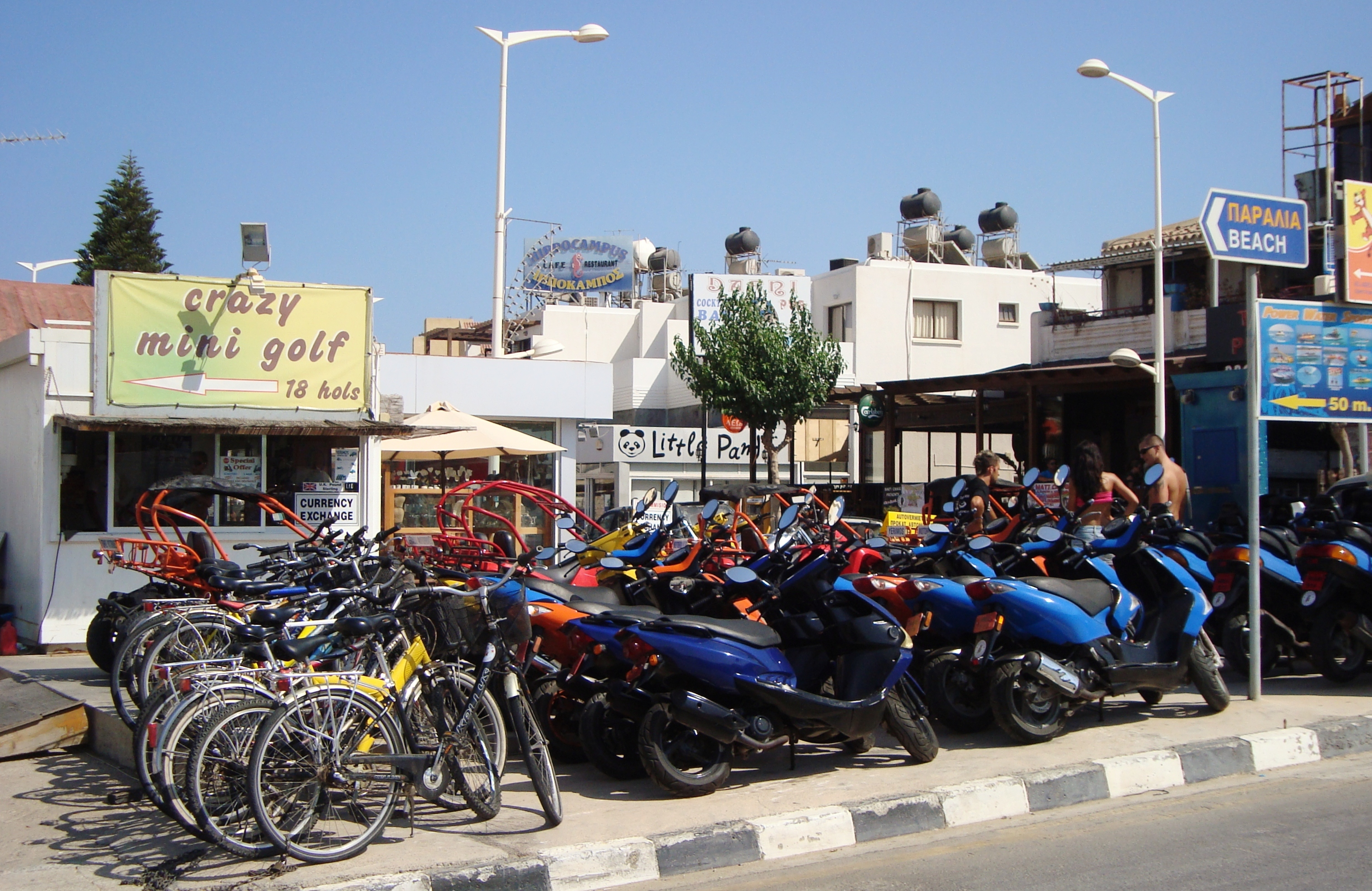
A motorbike rental shop

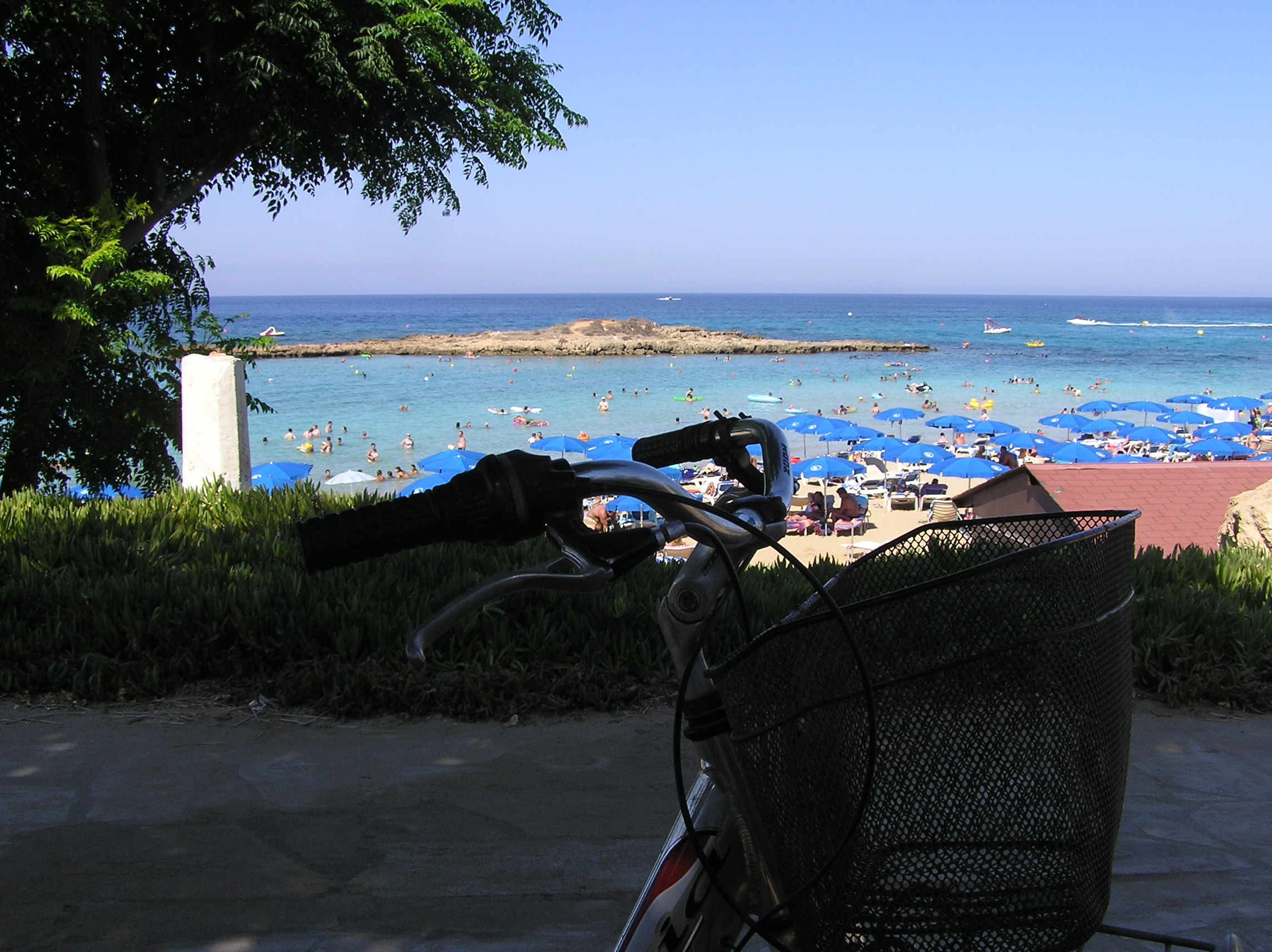
Fig Tree Bay

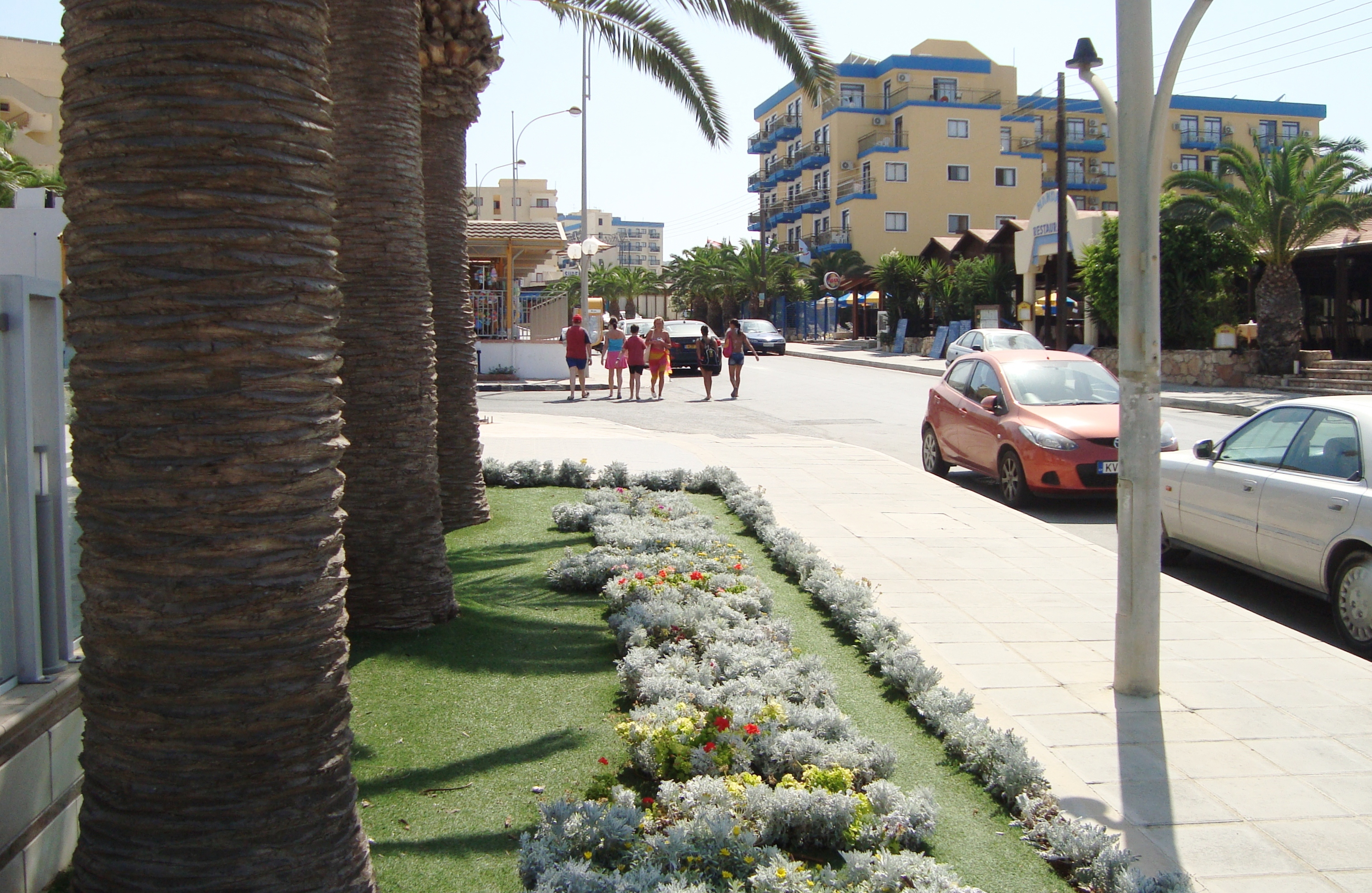
A typical road in Protaras

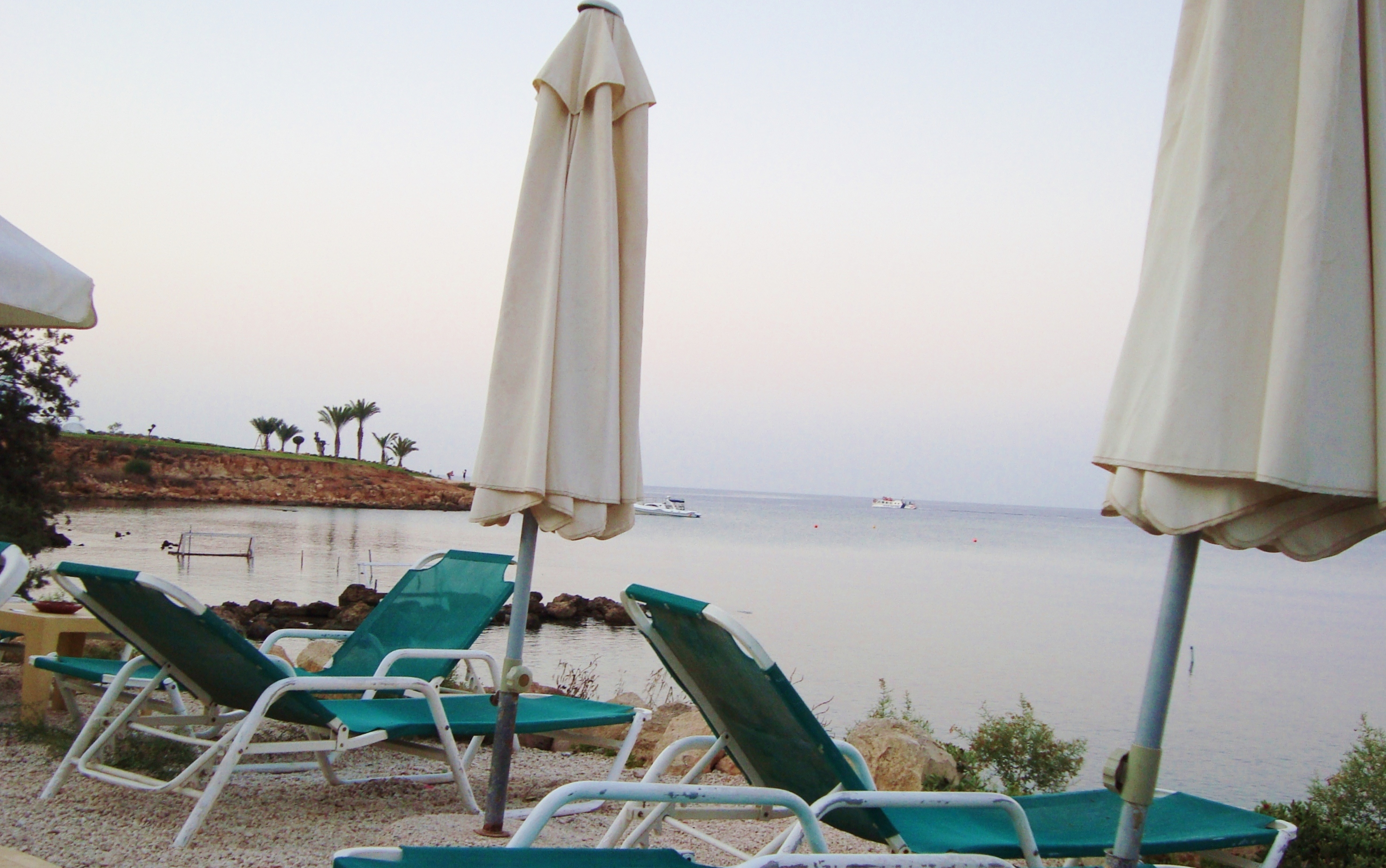
Sirena Bay beach

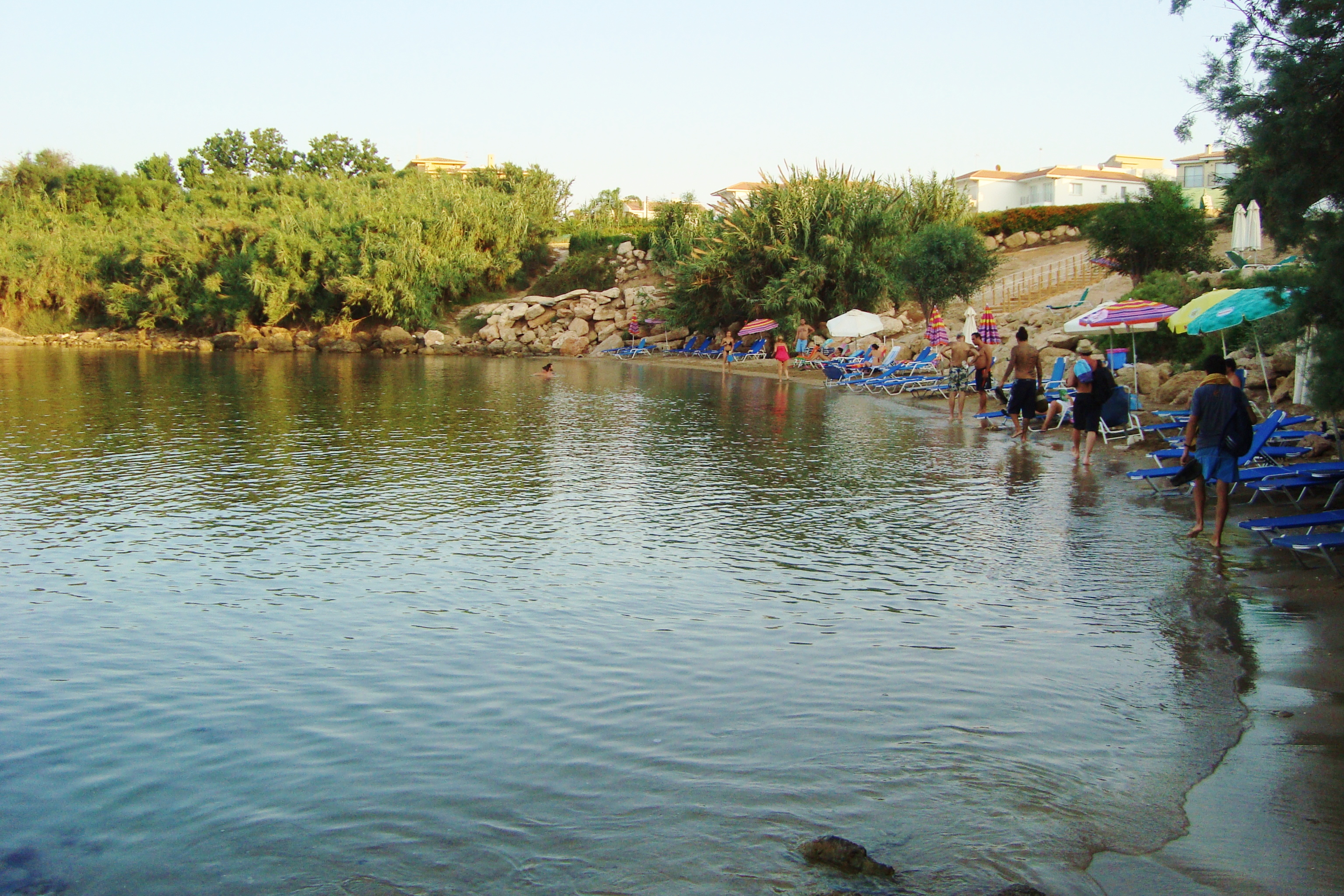
Sirena Bay

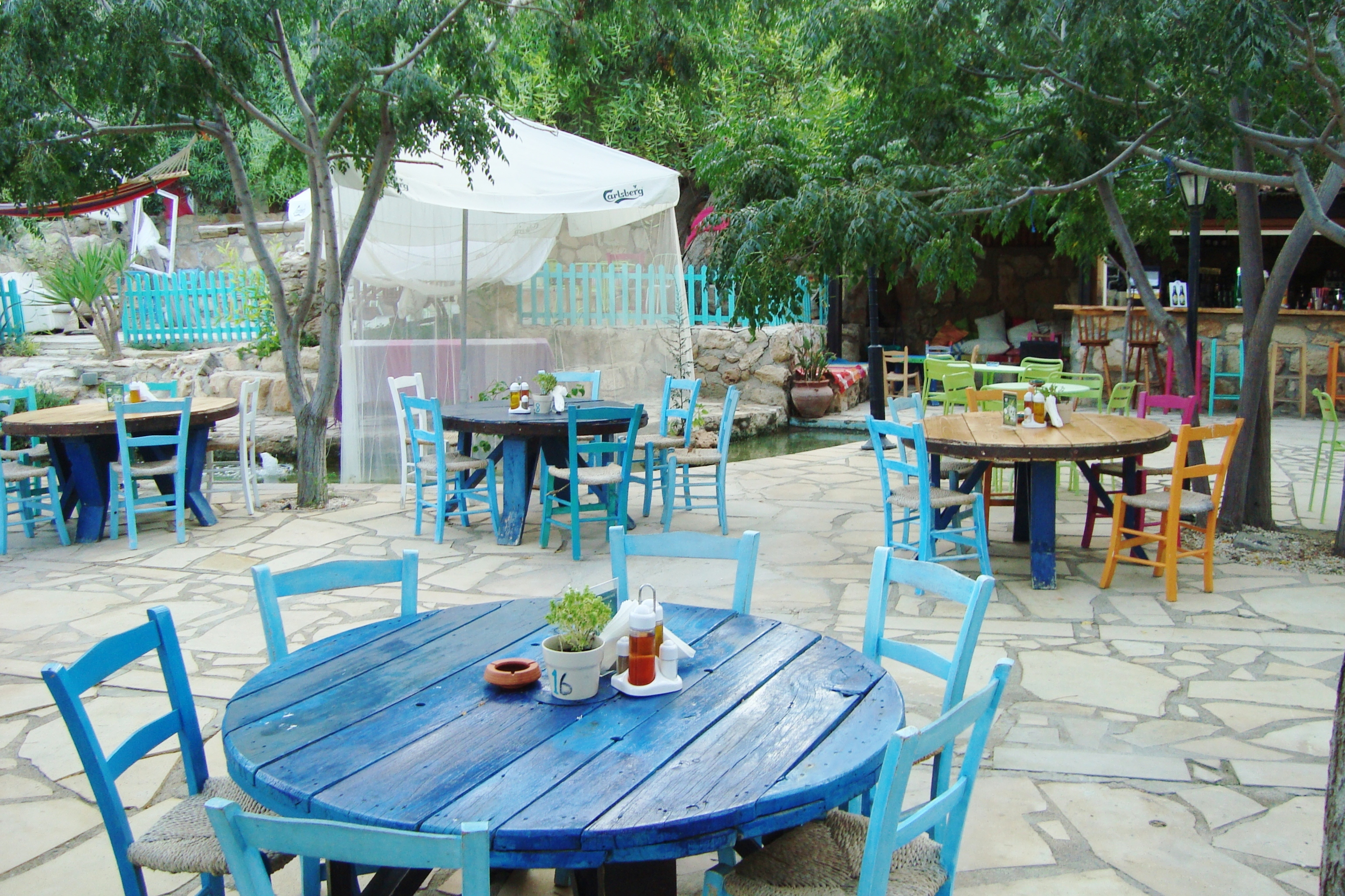
A taverna at Sirena Bay

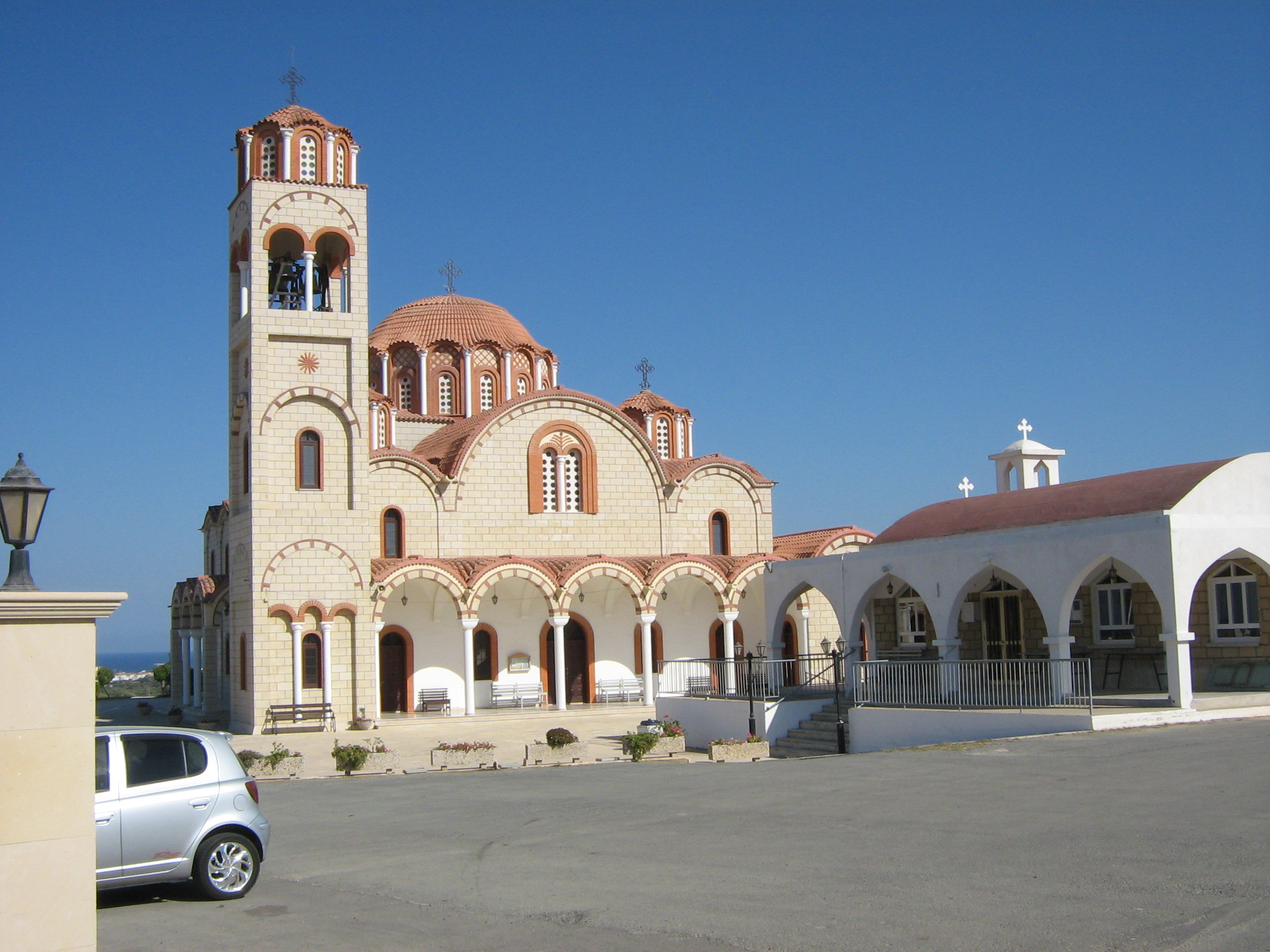
The Church of St. Barbara

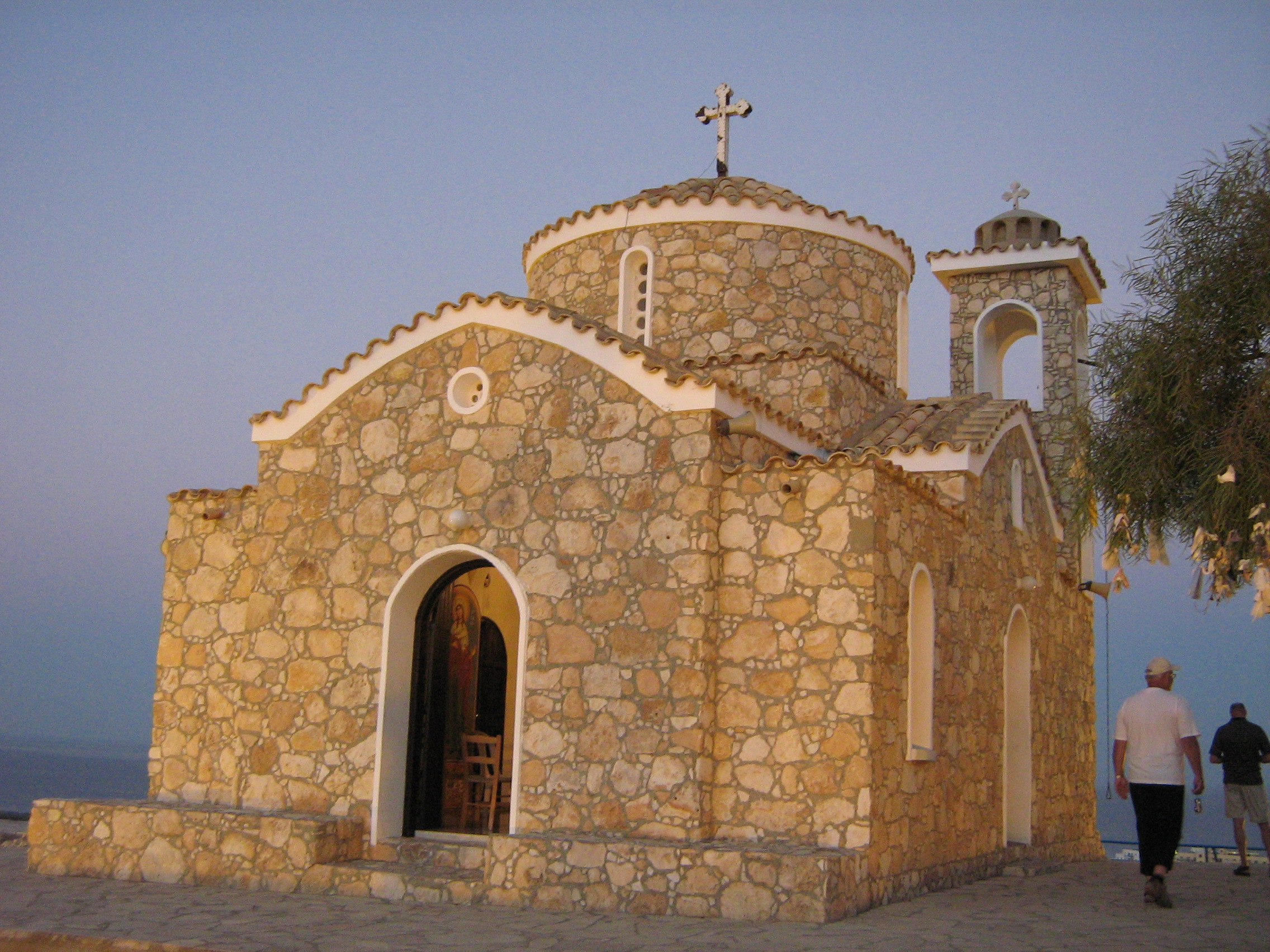
The Church of St. Elias

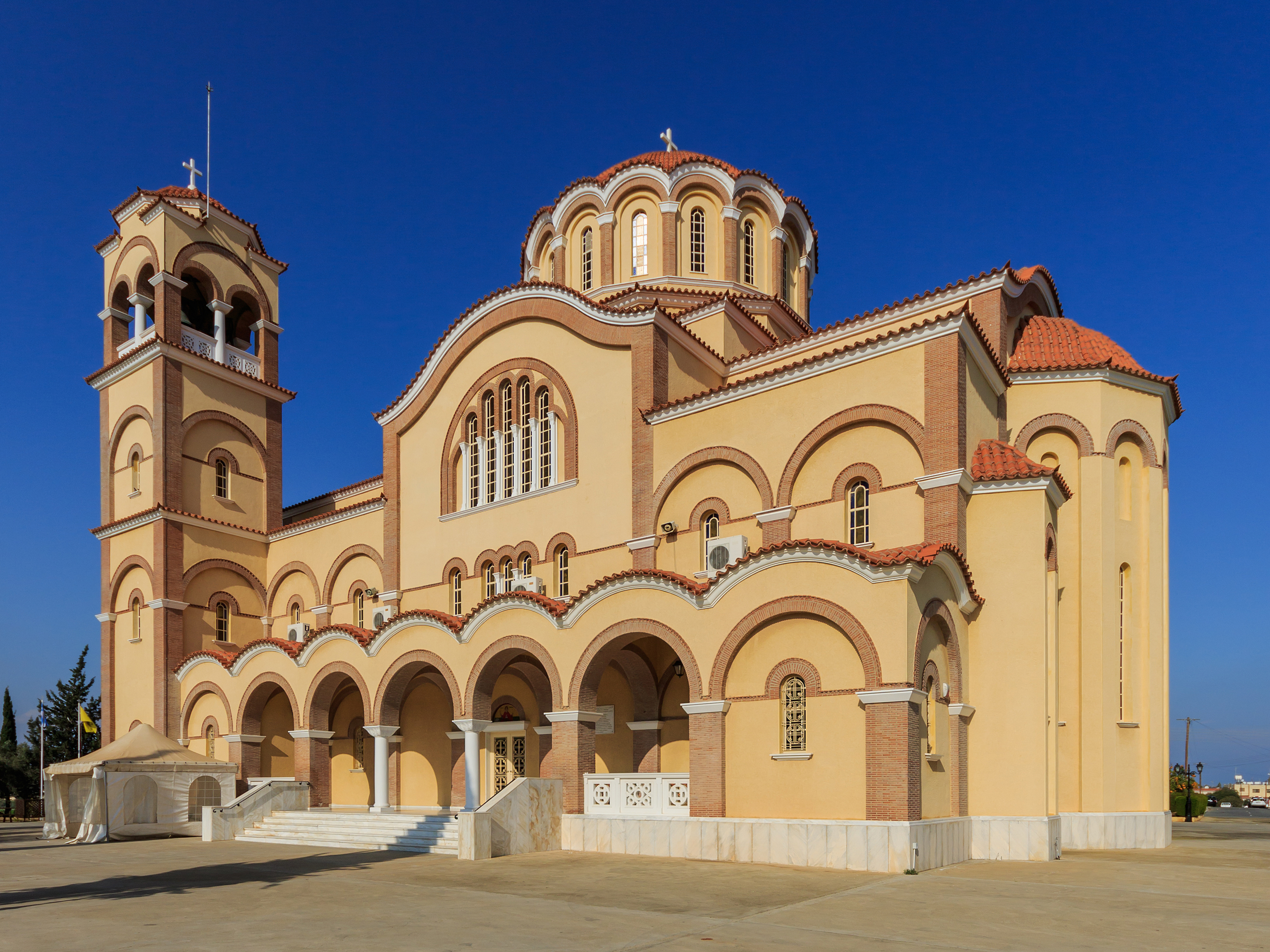
The Church of St. Demetrius

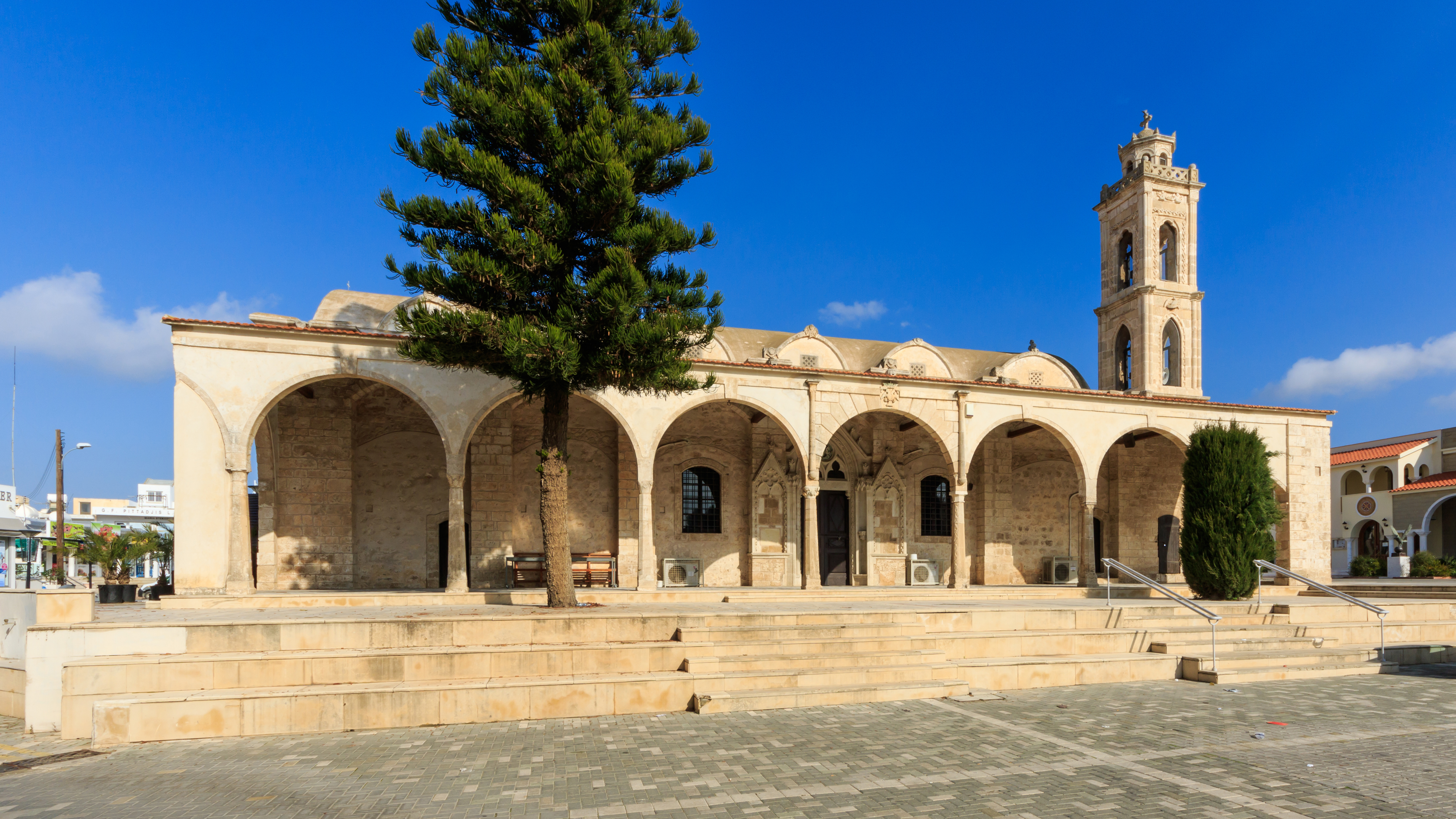
St. George Old Church

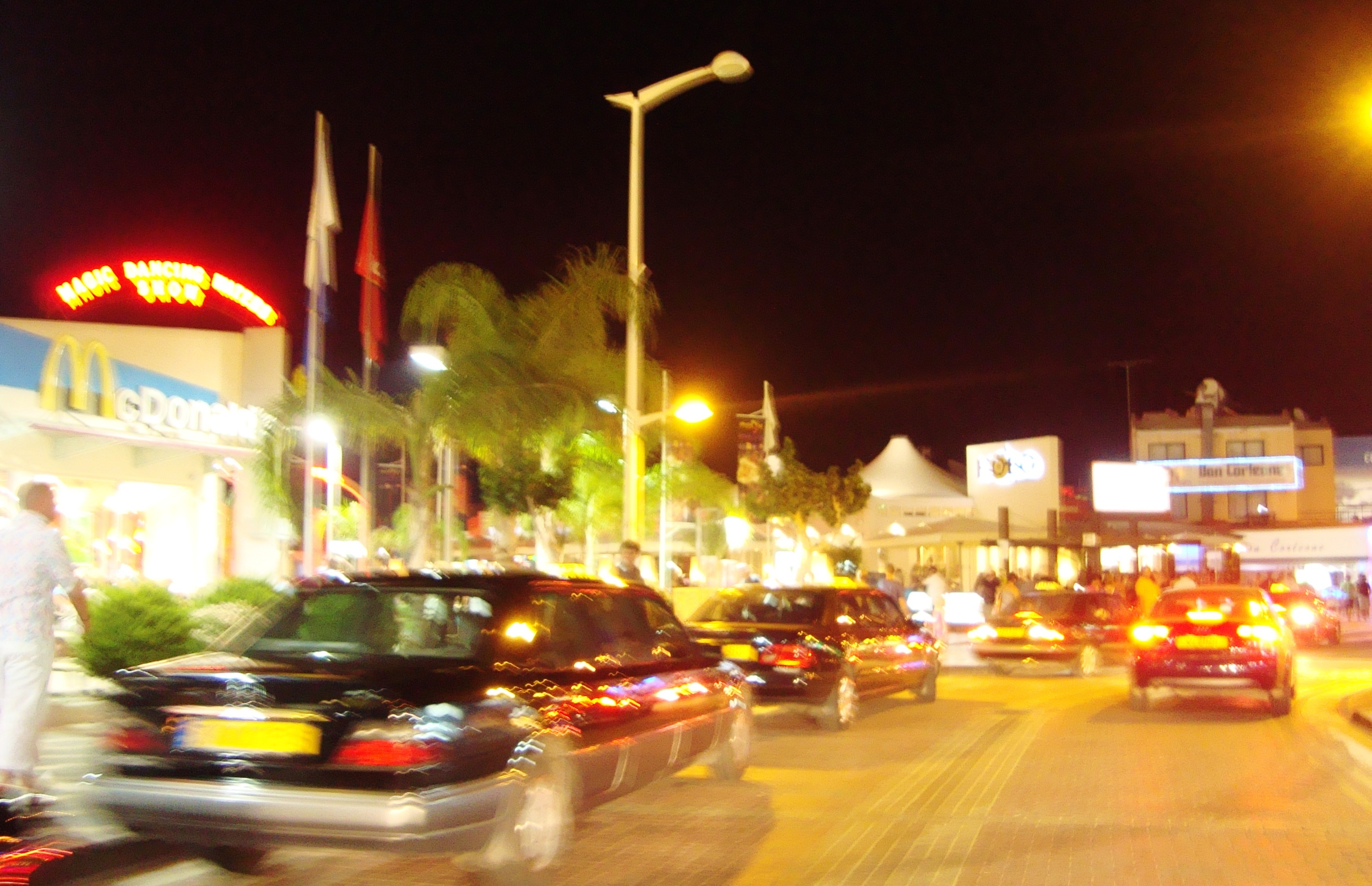
A Protaras street at night

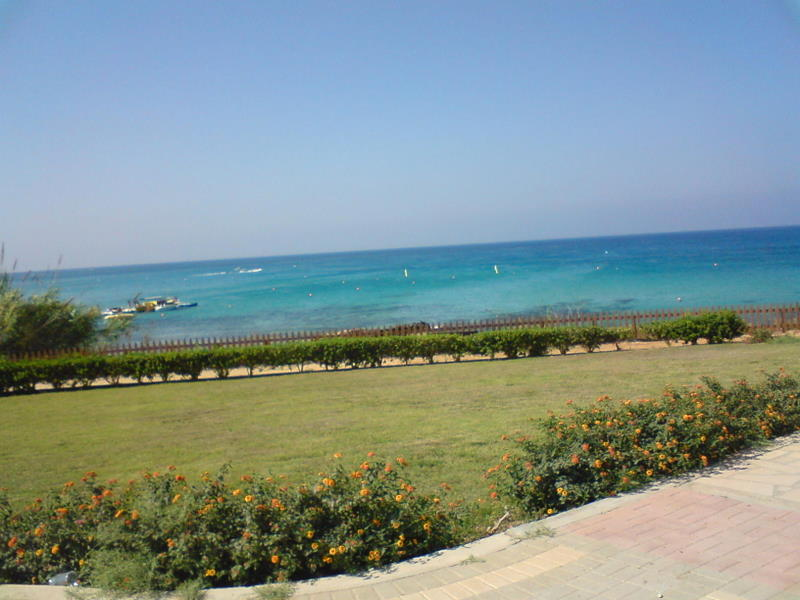
Gardens in Protaras

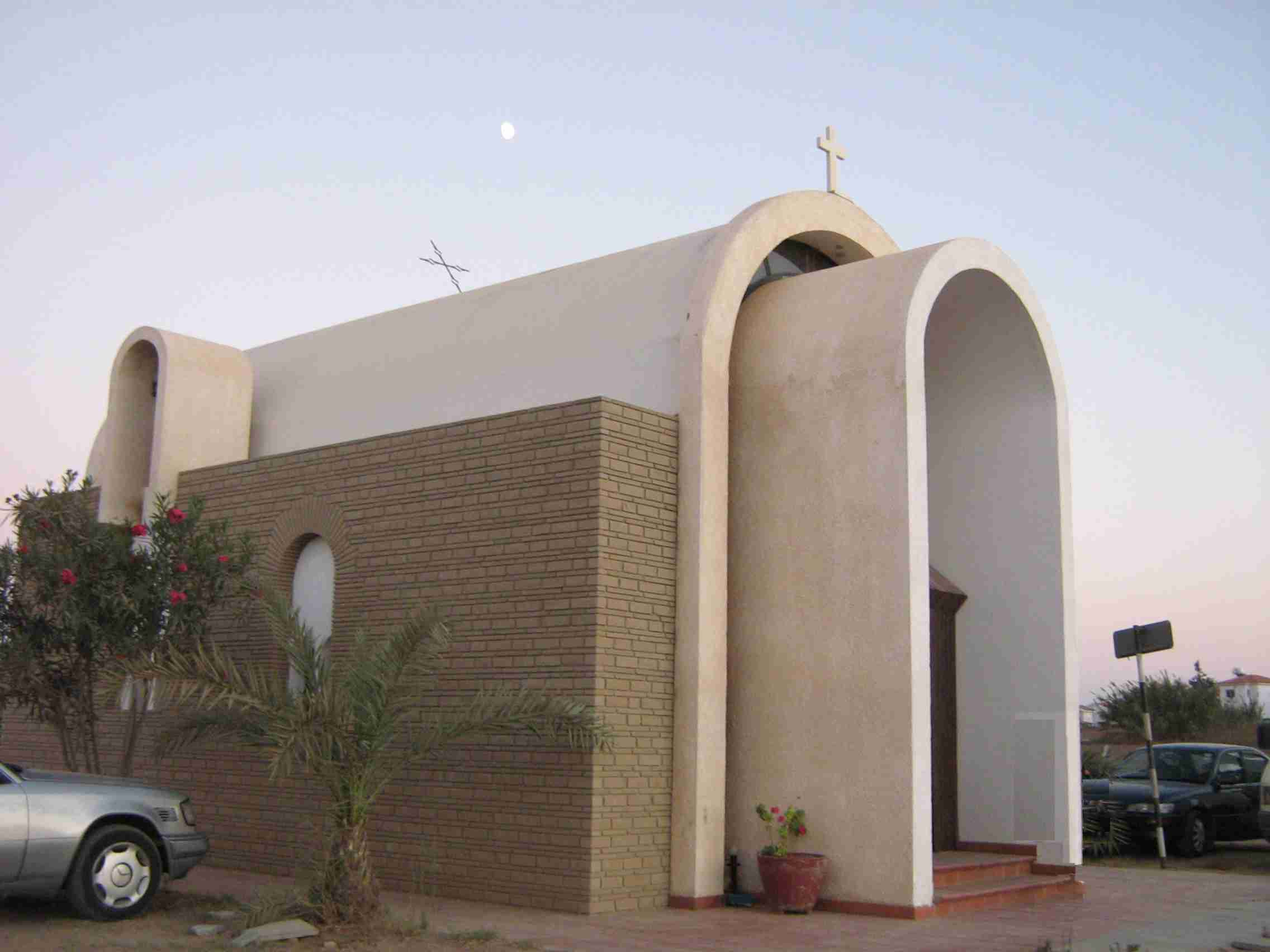
Agia Triada church

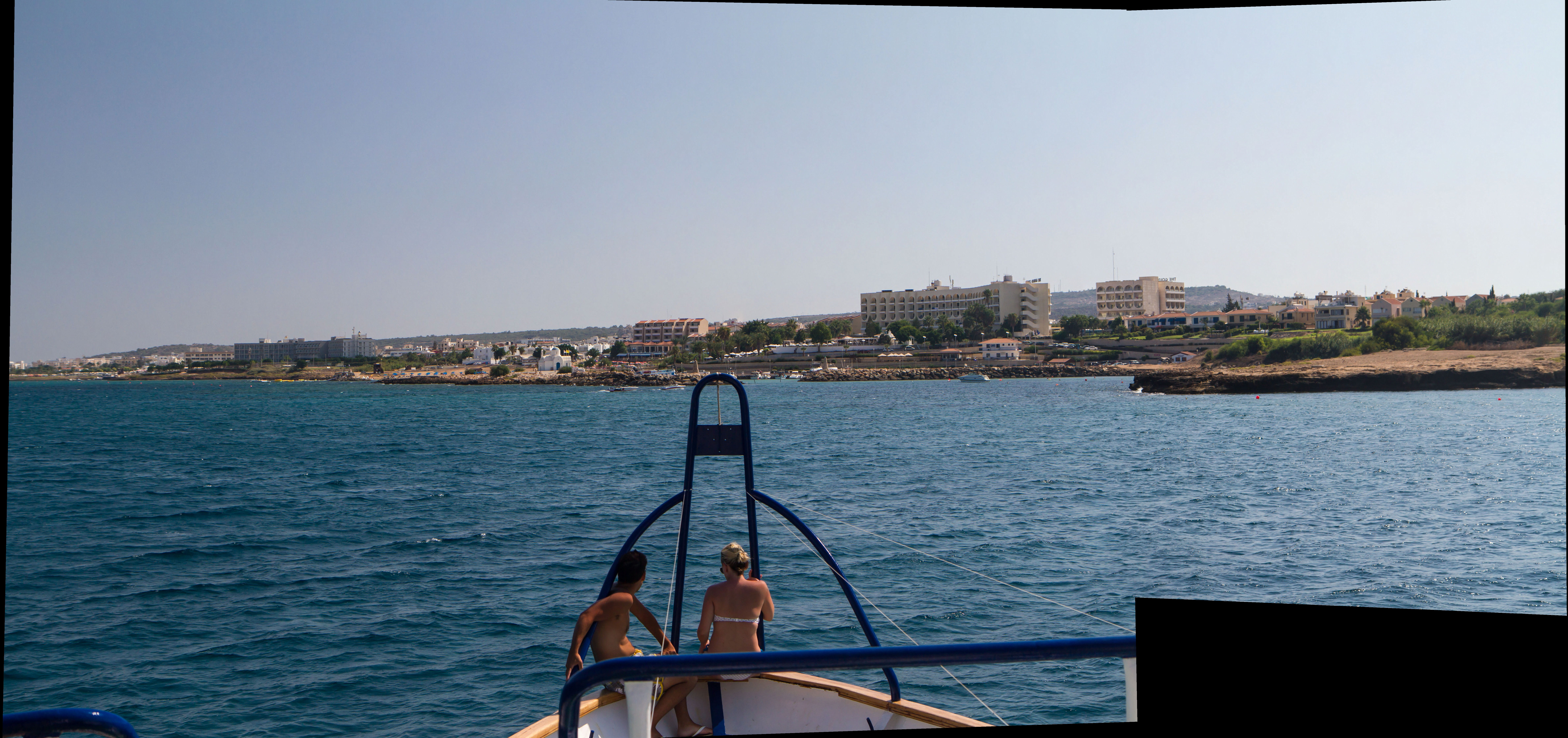
view from the sea

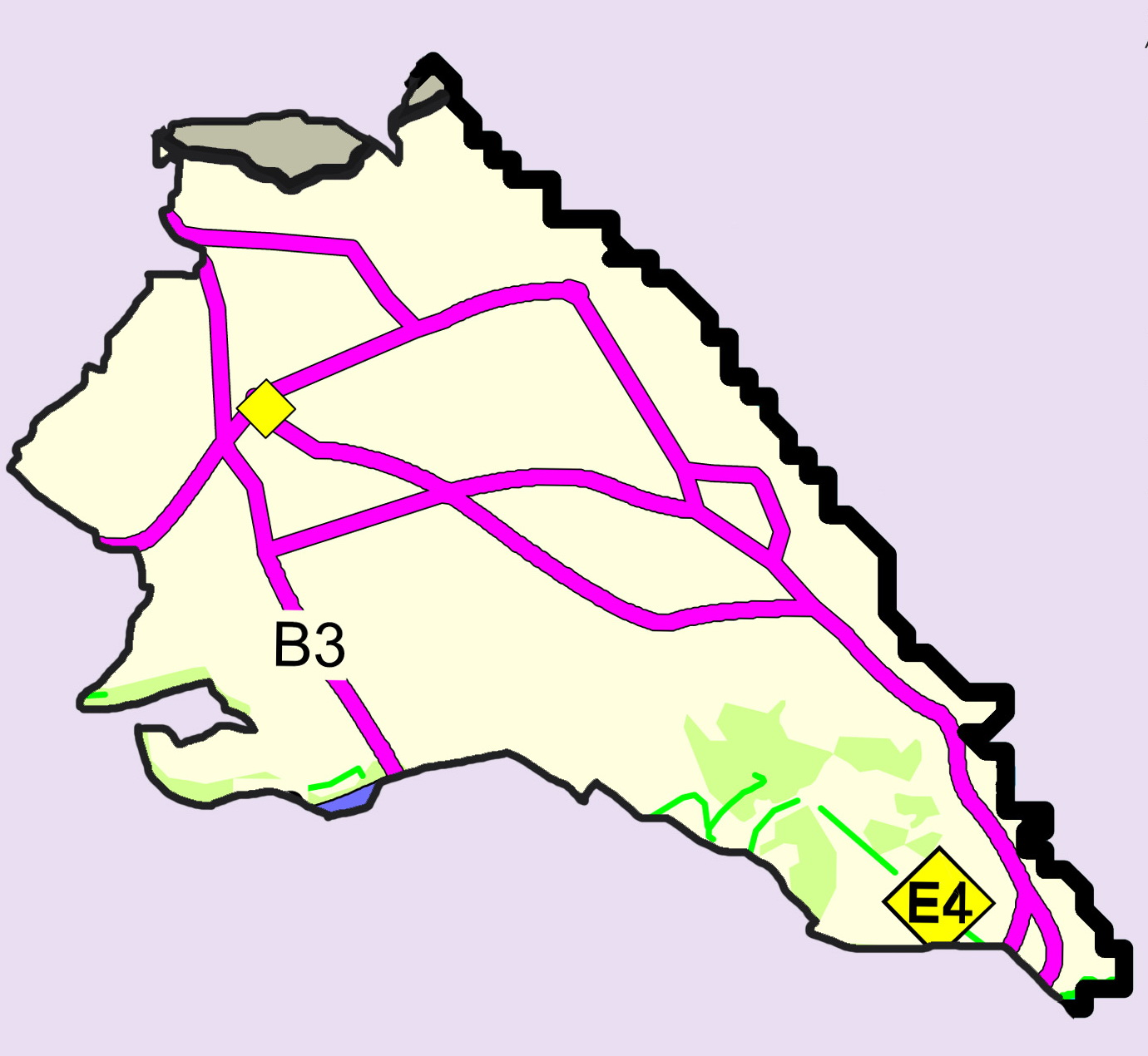
Municipal area and road network of Paralimni

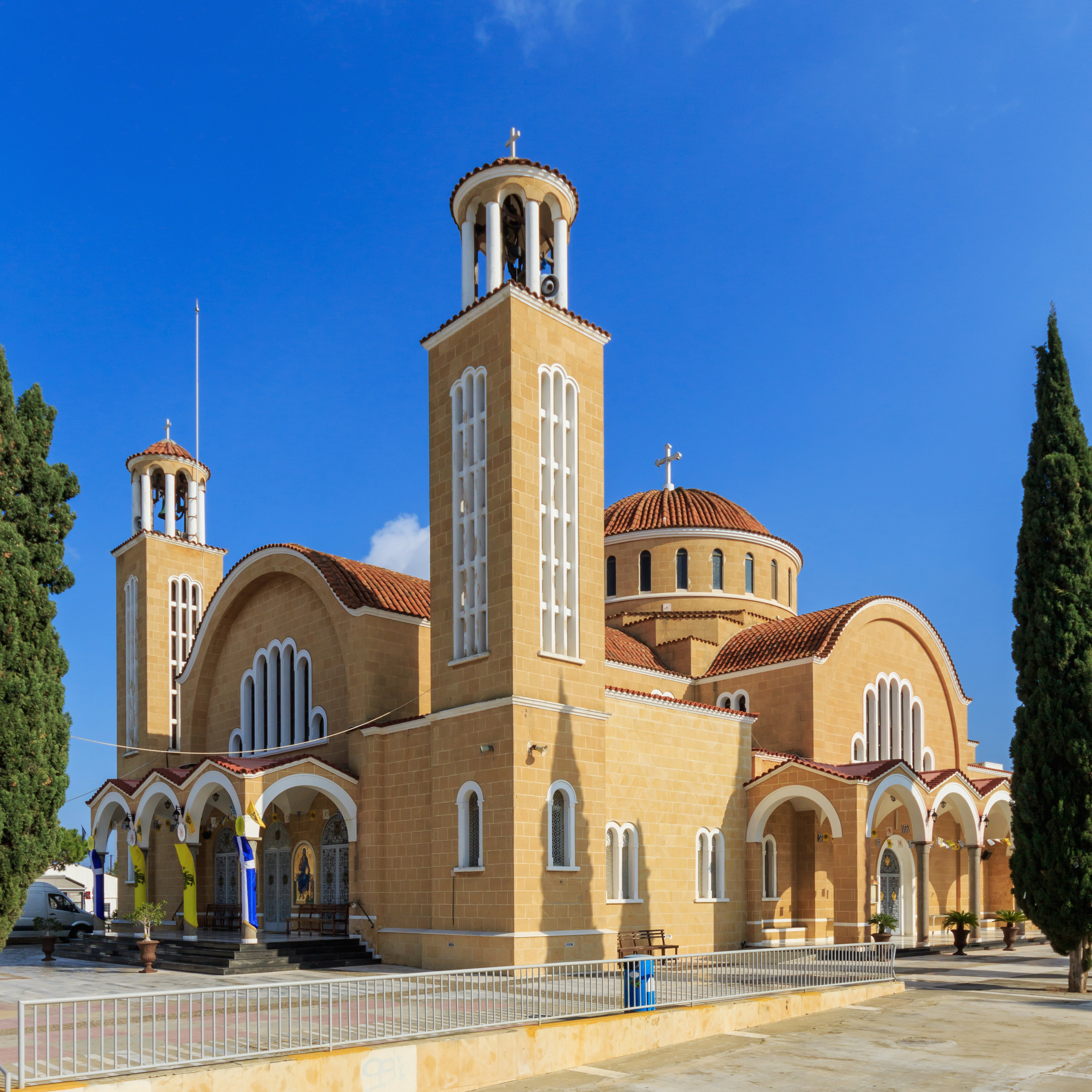
St. George's Cathedral in Paralímni

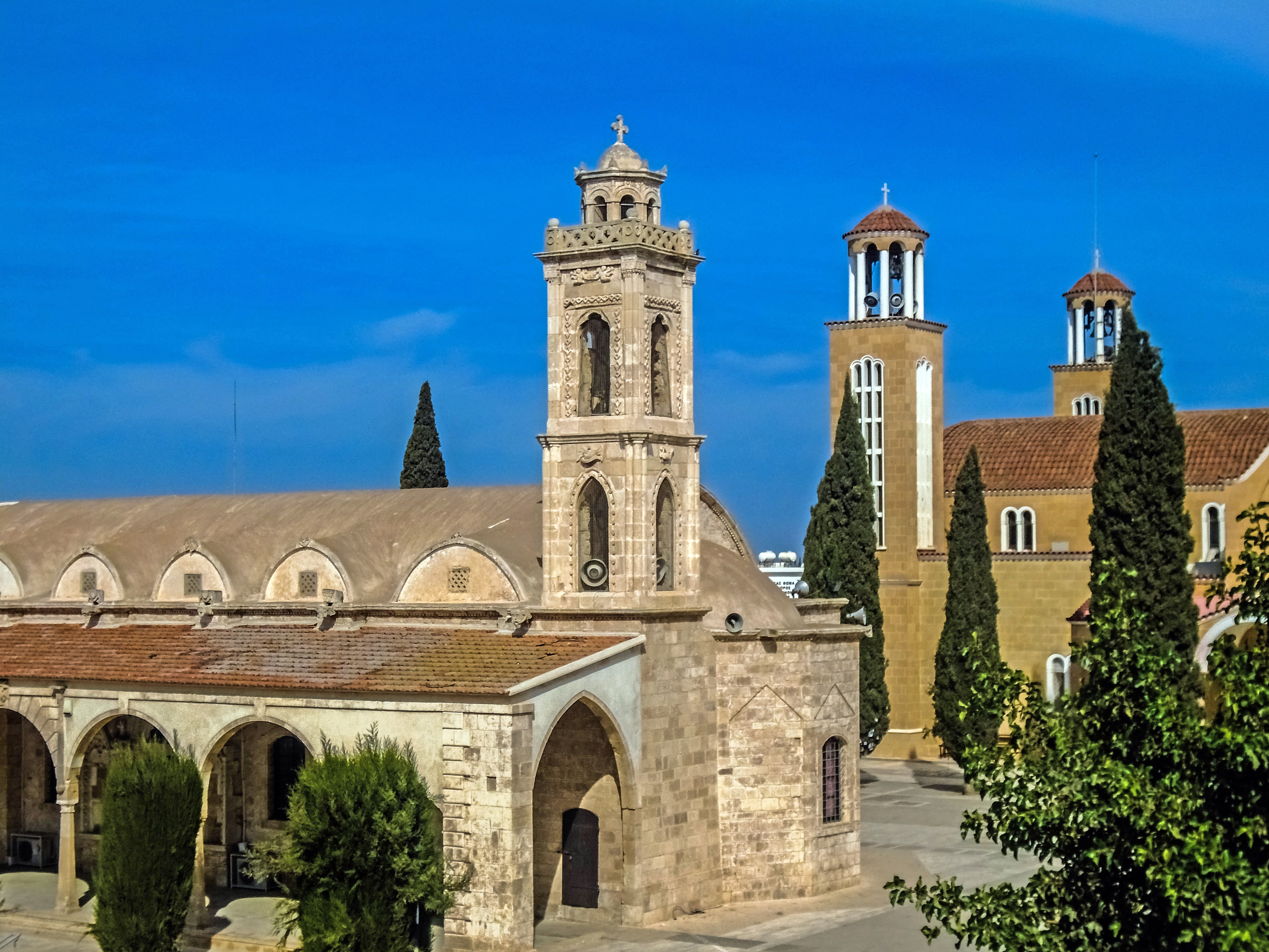
Old and New Cathedral of Paralímni

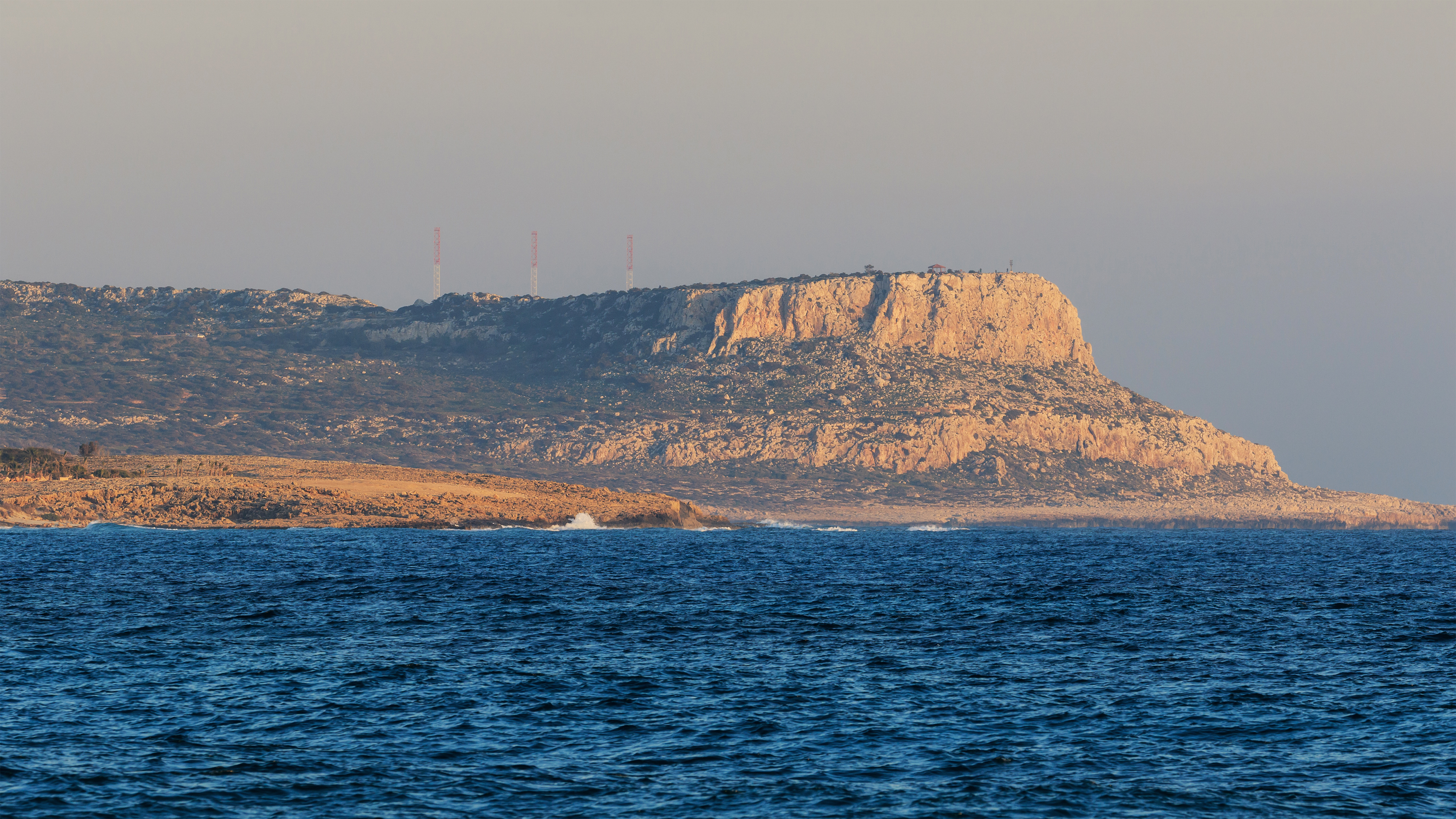
Cape Greco in the territory of the community of Paralimni

== See also ==
- Enosis Neon Paralimni FC
- Famagusta District
- Ayia Napa
