= Enosis Neon Paralimni FC =

Cypriot football club

Enosis Neon Paralimni
- Full name: Enosis Neon Paralimni (Athletic Union of Paralimni)
- Nickname: Βυσσινί (Crimsons)
- Founded: 1936; 90 years ago
- Ground: Paralimni Municipal Stadium "Tasos Marcou"; Paralimni
- Capacity: 5,800
- Chairman: Christodoulos Konstantinopoulos
- Manager: Constantinos Makrides
- League: Second Division
- 2025–26: First Division, 14th of 14 (relegated)
Home colours	Away colours

Enosis Neon Paralimni Football Club (Greek: Ένωση Νέων Παραλιμνίου, Enosi Neon Paralimniou; lit. 'Youth Union of Paralimni'), commonly referred to as ENP, is a Cypriot professional football club based in Paralimni. Currently playing in the Cypriot First Division, it holds home games at the Paralimni Municipal Stadium "Tasos Marcou", with the capacity of 5,800.

== History ==
Enosis Neon Paralimniou was founded in April 1944, following the merger of two Paralimni clubs, Heracles and People's Love.

The club's emblem is the Parthenon, with a trumpeter and the year 1936 inscription, birth year of the club Heracles. The only reason why founders decided to adopt the year 1936 as the new club's birth year instead of the year 1944 has purely to do with Heracles official papers. On those, it was clear that whenever the club's members decided to cease its operations, all of its assets (movable and immovable property) would go straight to the Church. In view of that and in order to avoid any legal implications, the newly born club of Enosis was reckoned by the authorities as a continuation of the club Heracles of Paralimni, absorbing the other club, People's Love.

The first football match played in Paralimni took place in the first half of the year 1945, some weeks before the end of World War II, against a German team of POWs (no further details found). The first recorded encounter was on 16 September 1945, against a mixed team from Anorthosis and EHAN, both of Famagusta (a final 4–5 loss).

The team's colours of claret and blue were introduced by the Parnerou brothers, who were both supporters of West Ham United, acquainted with player Bobby Moore and grew up in East London. Moore donated West Ham United kits for the team to play in 1971, two years after the team's promotion to the Cypriot First Division. These colours became an established part of the club itself. In March 2023, ahead of West Ham's UEFA Europa Conference League tie with AEK Larnaca, West Ham visited Enosis, with West Ham sporting director Mark Noble being a guest of honour at Enosis.

Until the early 1960s, Enosis took part only in local competitions, since the Cyprus Football Association (CFA) had repeatedly denied its participation in its competitions, stating that only clubs based in towns could take part. The CFA's denial was the reason why Enosis joined E.A.P.O., a village-based club association. In 1965, the CFA changed its rules and Enosis finally managed to join and participate in the second division. From the very beginning, the side tried to win promotion to the first division and, after four attempts, managed to finish first, in the football season of 1968–69. Since then, Enosis has taken part in all 45 editions of first division, being one of only five clubs never to have been demoted into the second division until 2013–14, when it was relegated for the first time to the second division after finishing 13th in the league.

== Honours ==
- Cypriot First Division:
  - Runner-up: 1974–75
- Cypriot Cup:
  - Runner-up: 1973–74, 1974–75, 1980–81, 1982–83
- Super Cup:
  - Runner-up: 1981, 1983
- Cypriot Second Division :
  - Champions (3): 1968–69, 2014–15, 2017–18

== History in European competition ==
=== Overall ===
Competition	Pld	W	D	L	GF	GA	GD
UEFA Cup Winners' Cup	4	1	0	3	4	15	-11
UEFA Cup	4	0	0	4	4	21	-17
UEFA Intertoto Cup	2	0	0	2	1	5	−4
Total	10	1	0	9	9	41	–32

=== Matches ===
Season	Competition	Round	Club	1st leg	2nd leg	Agg.
1975–76	UEFA Cup	1R	(West Germany) MSV Duisburg	1–7 (A)	2–3 (H) (Note: "Home" leg played at Niederrheinstadion)	3–10
1976–77	UEFA Cup	1R	(West Germany) Kaiserslautern	1–3 (H)	0–8 (A)	1–11
1981–82	European Cup Winners' Cup	1R	(Hungary) Vasas	1–0 (H)	0–8 (A)	1–8
1983–84	European Cup Winners' Cup	1R	(Belgium) Beveren	2–4 (H)	1–3 (A)	3–7
2002	UEFA Intertoto Cup	1R	(Austria) Bregenz	0–2 (H)	1–3 (A)	1–5

== Players ==
As of 15 September 2026

Note: Flags indicate national team as defined under FIFA eligibility rules; some limited exceptions apply. Players may hold more than one non-FIFA nationality.

No.	Pos.	Nation	Player
1	GK	CYP	Panagiotis Panagiotou
4	DF	CYP	Sean Ioannou
5	MF	MAR	Jalil Saadi
7	MF	NED	Luciano Narsingh
9	FW	GRE	Theodoros Fanourakis
10	FW	SRI	Sam Durrant
12	MF	DEN	Jonas Goldschadt
16	DF	CYP	Adamos Panagi
17	MF	CYP	Afxentis Ioannou
18	MF	CYP	Michalis Solomou
19	FW	ESP	Javi Navarro
20	MF	CYP	Konstantinos Karagiannis

No.	Pos.	Nation	Player
21	DF	CYP	Thomas Nikolaou
22	DF	CYP	Petros Paschali
25	DF	DEN	Rasmus Thelander
30	FW	AUT	Nicolai Bösch
34	GK	POL	Tymoteusz Seweryn
41	DF	CYP	Dimitris Chrysostomou
70	DF	CYP	Ektoras Stefanou
77	FW	SEN	Souleymane Bamba
88	FW	CYP	Dimitris Solomou
90	DF	CYP	Symeon Solomou
94	MF	FRA	Andrea Vennettilli
99	FW	CYP	Michalis Charalambous

=== Out on loan ===
Note: Flags indicate national team as defined under FIFA eligibility rules; some limited exceptions apply. Players may hold more than one non-FIFA nationality.

No.	Pos.	Nation	Player

== Club officials ==
=== Board of directors ===
Position	Staff
Executive Directors	(Cyprus) Christodoulos Konstantinopoulos
Executive Directors	(Cyprus) Athanasios Andronikidis
Executive Directors	(Cyprus) Apostolos Metaxas
Media Officer / Spokesman	(Cyprus) Giorgos Ioannidis
General Secretary	(Cyprus) Kyriakos Kyriakidis
Law Department	(Cyprus) Angelos Savvidis
Members	(Cyprus) Nikolaos Elefthyriou
Members	(Cyprus) Konstantinos Panagiotou
Members	(Cyprus) Alexandros Papadakis
Members	(Cyprus) Ioannis Apostolidis
Members	(Cyprus) Sokratis Kypriakis
Members	(Cyprus) Pavlos Nikolaou
Members	(Cyprus) Savvas Konstantinidis
Members	(Cyprus) Charalampos Mitsotakis
Members	(Cyprus) Loukas Giannakis
Members	(Cyprus) Iraklis Karapetakis

=== Technical and medical staff ===
Position	Staff
Football Director	(Cyprus) Giorgos Kosma
General manager	(Cyprus) Andronikos Christoforidis
Team manager	(Cyprus) Michalis Voutsos
Head coach	(Cyprus) Constantinos Makrides
Assistant coach	(Croatia) Danijel Vuković
Fitness coach	(Cyprus) Anastasios Angelidis
Rehabilitation coach	(Cyprus) Epaminondas Alafousos
Goalkeeper coach	(Cyprus) Manolis Iraklidis
Sports Scientist	(Cyprus) Dimitrios Damoulakis
Medical staff
Team doctor (orthopaedist)	(Cyprus) Kostas Charalampou
Team doctor (Pathologist)	(Cyprus) Christos Marinidis
Physiotherapist	(Cyprus) Evangelos Kyprianidis
Assistant Physiotherapist	(Cyprus) Thanasos Loukaidis
Caregiver	(Cyprus) Stanislaos Papagiannis

== Sponsorship ==
As of 2025, the club’s shirt sponsor is MeridianBet.

== Notable managers ==
- (Czechoslovakia) Svatopluk Pluskal (1971–78), (1983–85)
- (England) Vic Buckingham (1982)
- (Montenegro) Slobodan Vučeković (1993–1996)
- (Germany) Gerhard Prokop (1996–1997)
- (Bulgaria) Angel Kolev (1998–1999)
- (Bosnia and Herzegovina) Nenad Starovlah (1999–2000)
- (Israel) Eli Guttman (2004–2006)
- (Israel) Nir Klinger (1 July 2006 – 12 September 2007)
- (Cyprus) Marios Constantinou (2007–2008)
- (Cyprus) Panayiotis Xiourouppas (2008)
- (Bulgaria) Eduard Eranosyan (2008)
- (Cyprus) Antonis Kleftis & Adamos Adamou (2008–2009)
- (North Macedonia) Čedomir Janevski (10 June 2009 – 10 January 2011)
- (Cyprus) Nikodimos Papavasiliou (18 Jan 2011 – 9 January 2012)
- (Israel) Nir Klinger (11 Jan 2012 – 8 April 2012)
- (Cyprus) Marios Karas (April 2012 – May 2012)
- (Cyprus) Zouvanis Zouvani (May 2012 – Oct 2012)
- (Netherlands) Ton Caanen (27 September 2012 – 30 June 2013)
- (Serbia) Saša Jovanović (1 July 2013 – 11 October 2013)
- (Cyprus) Marios Karas (interim) (12 Oct 2013 – 1 December 2013)
- (Cyprus) Nikos Andronikou (2 Dec 2013 – 15 April 2014)
- (Cyprus) Marios Constantinou (10 June 2014 – 10 November 2014)
- (Greece) Nikos Karageorgiou (16 Nov 2014 – 5 November 2015)
- (Belgium) Ronny Van Geneugden (10 Nov 2015 – 21 May 2016)
- (Cyprus) Kostas Kaiafas (27 May 2016 – 13 February 2017)
- (Cyprus) Giorgos Kosma (13 Feb 2017 – 25 March 2017)
- (Cyprus) Apostolos Makrides (26 June 2017 – 24 October 2017)
- (Netherlands) André Paus (31 Oct 2017 – 14 November 2018)
- (Denmark) Carit Falch (29 Nov 2018 – 23 April 2019)
- (Cyprus) Giorgos Kosma (23 Apr 2019 – 27 September 2019)
- (Argentina) Gustavo Siviero (30 Sep 2019 – 20 January 2020)
- (North Macedonia) Čedomir Janevski (20 Jan 2020 – 31 May 2020)
- (Cyprus) Marios Karas (1 Jun 2020 – 21 September 2020)
- (Spain) Carlos Alós (21 Sep 2020 – 11 April 2021)
- (Greece) Sotiris Antoniou (12 Apr 2021 – 10 July 2021)
- (Cyprus) Marinos Satsias (17 July 2021 – 30 June 2023)
- (Italy) Manuele Blasi (25 July 2023 – 14 November 2023)
- (Spain) David Caneda (16 November 2023 – April 2024)

== See also ==
- 2008–09 Enosis Neon Paralimni F.C. season
