= List of Cypriot football transfers summer 2011 =

This is a list of Cypriot football transfers for the 2011–12 summer transfer window by club. Only transfers of clubs in the Cypriot First Division and Cypriot Second Division are included.

The summer transfer window opened on 9 June 2011, although a few transfers took place prior to that date. The window closed at midnight on 31 August 2011. Players without a club may join one at any time, either during or in between transfer windows.

== Marfin Laiki League ==
=== AEK Larnaca ===
In: Note: Flags indicate national team as defined under FIFA eligibility rules; some limited exceptions apply. Players may hold more than one non-FIFA nationality.

No.	Pos.	Nation	Player
—	MF	POR	Saavedra (loan return from Doxa Katokopias)
—	DF	CYP	Michalis Michael (loan return from ASIL Lysi)
—	MF	CYP	Michalis Demetriou (loan return from Chalkanoras Idaliou)
—	GK	CYP	Panayiotis Kythreotis (loan return from Omonia Aradippou)
—	DF	CYP	Kyriacos Kyriacou (loan return from Nea Salamina)
—	MF	CYP	Kyriacos Pavlou (from APOP Kinyras Peyias)
—	FW	CMR	Njongo Priso (from (Malta) Valletta)
—	MF	NGA	Yakubu Alfa (free agent)
—	DF	ESP	Albert Serrán (from (England) Swansea City)
—	FW	SRB	Miljan Mrdaković (from Apollon Limassol)
—	MF	ESP	Gonzalo García (from (Netherlands) FC Groningen)
—	DF	NED	Tim de Cler (from (Netherlands) Feyenoord)
—	MF	GRE	Giannis Skopelitis (from Anorthosis Famagusta)
—	DF	ESP	Ander Murillo (from (Spain) Celta de Vigo)
—	FW	ESP	Gorka Pintado (from (England) Swansea City)
—	DF	POR	Diogo Vila (on loan from Doxa Katokopia)

Out: Note: Flags indicate national team as defined under FIFA eligibility rules; some limited exceptions apply. Players may hold more than one non-FIFA nationality.

No.	Pos.	Nation	Player
—	FW	CYP	Alekos Alekou (to Nea Salamina)
—	DF	CYP	Loukas Louka (released)
—	DF	NED	Danny Schenkel (to (Netherlands) Telstar)
—	FW	BRA	Alan (released)
—	FW	EST	Andres Oper (released)
—	DF	CYP	Orthodoxos Ioannou (to Ermis Aradippou)
—	MF	ARG	Gonzalo Cabrera (loan return to (Argentina) Boca Juniors)
—	FW	ESP	Gorka Pintado (loan return to (England) Swansea City)
—	MF	POR	Saavedra (to Ermis Aradippou)
—	DF	CYP	Michalis Michael (to Omonia Aradippou)
—	MF	CYP	Michalis Demetriou (to Enosis Neon Parekklisia)
—	MF	BEL	Tom Caluwé (to (Belgium) Londerzeel)
—	DF	CYP	Christos Theophilou (to Apollon Limassol)
—	MF	GRE	Giorgos Lambropoulos (to Nea Salamina)
—	MF	POR	Renato Margaça (to Omonia)
—	DF	CYP	Kyriacos Kyriacou (to APOP Kinyras)

=== AEL Limassol ===
In: Note: Flags indicate national team as defined under FIFA eligibility rules; some limited exceptions apply. Players may hold more than one non-FIFA nationality.

No.	Pos.	Nation	Player
—	FW	BRA	Serjão (loan return from Alki Larnaca)
—	DF	CYP	Pantelis Pitsillos (loan return from Aris Limassol)
—	FW	SLE	Allie Andrew (loan return from APEP)
—	FW	CYP	Angelos Perikleous (loan return from Atromitos Yeroskipou)
—	MF	BRA	Edmar (from Alki Larnaca)
—	MF	CYP	Georgios Eleftheriou (from Doxa Katokopias)
—	DF	CPV	Nilson (from (Portugal) Portimonense S.C.)
—	GK	CYP	Simos Tsiakkas (from APEP)
—	MF	BRA	Bebê (from (Portugal) G.D. Estoril Praia)
—	FW	POR	Monteiro (from (Portugal) C.D. Santa Clara)
—	GK	ARG	Matías Degra (from (Greece) Asteras Tripolis)
—	FW	CPV	Cafú (from Anorthosis Famagusta)
—	GK	ALB	Isli Hidi (from Olympiakos Nicosia)
—	DF	POR	Carlitos (from (Portugal) Atlético CP)
—	FW	CIV	Vouho (from (Portugal) S.C. Covilhã)
—	DF	CMR	Patrick Leugueun (from (France) Vannes OC)
—	MF	ANG	Dédé (from Olympiakos Nicosia)
—	DF	ANG	Marco Airosa (on loan from (Portugal) C.D. Nacional)
—	FW	NGA	Benjamin Onwuachi (from (Greece) Kavala)

Out: Note: Flags indicate national team as defined under FIFA eligibility rules; some limited exceptions apply. Players may hold more than one non-FIFA nationality.

No.	Pos.	Nation	Player
—	MF	BIH	Dušan Kerkez (to Aris Limassol)
—	MF	POR	Zé Vítor (released)
—	MF	NED	Nicky Hofs (to (Netherlands) Vitesse Arnhem)
—	MF	NED	Mike Zonneveld (to (Netherlands) NAC Breda)
—	FW	POL	Grzegorz Rasiak (to (Poland) Jagiellonia Białystok)
—	MF	POR	Miguel Vargas (to AEP Paphos)
—	MF	CYP	Alexandros Garpozis (to AEP Paphos)
—	DF	CYP	Loizos Kakoyiannis (to AEP Paphos)
—	GK	CYP	Charalambos Kairinos (to Enosis Neon Parekklisia)
—	FW	ARG	Silvio González (to Aris Limassol)
—	FW	BRA	Serjão (to Ermis Aradippou)
—	FW	SLE	Allie Andrew (to ASIL)
—	DF	GRE	Vangelis Koutsopoulos (to (Greece) Levadiakos)
—	GK	POL	Arkadiusz Malarz (to (Greece) Panachaiki)
—	MF	BRA	Eli Marques (to (Bulgaria) Slavia Sofia)
—	MF	CHI	Nicolás Corvetto (to (Chile) Coquimbo Unido)
—	GK	LVA	Artūrs Vaičulis (to Atromitos Yeroskipou)
—	MF	CYP	Pavlos Pafitis (to APOP Kinyras Peyias)
—	DF	POR	Carlos Marques (to Alki Larnaca)
—	FW	ANG	Freddy (to Omonia)
—	MF	POR	Hélio Roque (on loan to Nea Salamina)
—	MF	CYP	Martinos Christofi (on loan to Enosis Neon Parekklisia)

=== Alki Larnaca ===
In: Note: Flags indicate national team as defined under FIFA eligibility rules; some limited exceptions apply. Players may hold more than one non-FIFA nationality.

No.	Pos.	Nation	Player
—	FW	ESP	Arnal (from Doxa Katokopias)
—	FW	POR	Bernardo Vasconcelos (from AEP Paphos)
—	DF	POR	Santamaria (from AEP Paphos)
—	FW	ARG	David Solari (from AEP Paphos)
—	MF	ESP	Jonathan Aspas (from AEP Paphos)
—	MF	NGA	Richard Eromoigbe (from Anorthosis Famagusta)
—	DF	MKD	Robert Popov (free agent)
—	MF	GAM	Seyfo Soley (from Doxa Katokopias)
—	MF	CYP	Antonis Katsis (on loan from Omonia)
—	DF	CYP	Constantinos Samaras (from Ermis Aradippou)
—	GK	CYP	Demetris Stylianou (from Aris Limassol)
—	DF	HAI	Frantz Bertin (from (Greece) OFI)
—	FW	ANG	Luwamo Garcia (from (Greece) Ethnikos Asteras)
—	DF	POR	Carlos Marques (from AEL Limassol)
—	MF	CYP	Giorgos Panagi (from Omonia)
—	MF	MKD	Nikola Gligorov (from Ermis Aradippou)
—	DF	GNB	Bruno Fernandes (from Ermis Aradippou)
—	MF	ROU	Dragoş Firţulescu (from (Romania) Universitatea Craiova)
—	DF	CYP	Elias Charalambous (from Omonia)

Out: Note: Flags indicate national team as defined under FIFA eligibility rules; some limited exceptions apply. Players may hold more than one non-FIFA nationality.

No.	Pos.	Nation	Player
—	FW	BRA	Serjão (loan return to AEL Limassol)
—	MF	BRA	Edmar (to AEL Limassol)
—	MF	SVN	Luka Žinko (to (Slovenia) Rudar Velenje)
—	MF	SVN	Anton Žlogar (to (Italy) Pordenone)
—	DF	SRB	Aleksandar Pantić (to (Bosnia and Herzegovina) Rudar Prijedor)
—	FW	JOR	Odai Al-Saify (loan return to (Greece) Skoda Xanthi)
—	FW	POR	António Semedo (to (Azerbaijan) Khazar Lankaran)
—	MF	BRA	Roberto Brum (released)
—	DF	CYP	Andreas Constantinou (released)
—	FW	AUS	Dimitris Hatzimouratis (to (Australia) Oakleigh Cannons)
—	DF	ISR	Haim Megrelashvili (to (Israel) Maccabi Haifa)
—	MF	VEN	Héctor González (to Ermis Aradippou)
—	MF	CYP	Marios Zachariou (to PAEEK FC)
—	GK	ENG	Corrin Brooks-Meade (to Ermis Aradippou)
—	MF	EIR	Robbie Gibbons (to Ermis Aradippou)
—	DF	ARG	Daniel Blanco (to Ermis Aradippou)
—	DF	MKD	Robert Popov (to (Switzerland) SC Kriens)
—	MF	GAM	Seyfo Soley (released)
—	MF	NGA	Richard Eromoigbe (released)

=== Anagennisi Dherynia ===
In: Note: Flags indicate national team as defined under FIFA eligibility rules; some limited exceptions apply. Players may hold more than one non-FIFA nationality.

No.	Pos.	Nation	Player
—	FW	CYP	Giorgos Tofas (from (England) Queens Park Rangers)
—	DF	CYP	Christos Kotsonis (from Ethnikos Achna)
—	GK	CYP	Panayiotis Charalambous (from Enosis Neon Paralimni)
—	MF	POR	Hugo Soares (from (Portugal) Penafiel)
—	MF	CRO	Robert Alviž (from (Albania) Kastrioti)
—	MF	CYP	Demetris Kyriakou (from APOEL)
—	DF	VEN	Raúl González (from Apollon Limassol)
—	MF	GRE	Athanasios Pindonis (from (Greece) Kallithea)
—	MF	AUT	Mato Šimunović (from (Slovenia) NK Domžale)
—	DF	GRE	Spyros Gogolos (from (Greece) Agrotikos Asteras)
—	FW	BIH	Ivan Jolić (from (Albania) Skënderbeu Korçë)
—	GK	SVK	Pavol Penksa (from (Slovakia) MFK Ružomberok)
—	FW	ZIM	Thabani Moyo (free agent)

Out: Note: Flags indicate national team as defined under FIFA eligibility rules; some limited exceptions apply. Players may hold more than one non-FIFA nationality.

No.	Pos.	Nation	Player
—	MF	HUN	Lajos Terjék (to Ayia Napa FC)
—	MF	CYP	Panayiotis Kosma (to Ayia Napa FC)
—	GK	HUN	Balázs Farkas (released)
—	FW	CYP	Kyriacos Chadjaros (released)
—	MF	CYP	Antreas Antreou (released)

=== Anorthosis ===
In: Note: Flags indicate national team as defined under FIFA eligibility rules; some limited exceptions apply. Players may hold more than one non-FIFA nationality.

No.	Pos.	Nation	Player
—	FW	POR	Miguel Pedro (loan return from Ermis Aradippou)
—	FW	CYP	Constantinos Mintikkis (loan return from ASIL Lysi)
—	DF	CYP	Loukas Stylianou (loan return from Digenis Morphou)
—	DF	BUL	Igor Tomašić (from (Greece) Kavala)
—	MF	SRB	Nemanja Vučićević (from (Greece) Kavala)
—	FW	BRA	Evandro Roncatto (from Ermis Aradippou)
—	DF	SRB	Marko Andić (from (Hungary) Videoton)
—	FW	CZE	Jan Rezek (On loan from (Czech Republic) Viktoria Plzeň)
—	GK	BUL	Dimitar Ivankov (from (Turkey) Bursaspor)
—	FW	BUL	Emil Angelov (from (Turkey) Karabükspor)
—	MF	BUL	Marquinhos (from (Bulgaria) CSKA Sofia)
—	GK	POL	Adam Stachowiak (on loan from (Poland) Górnik Zabrze)
—	FW	CYP	Michalis Constantinou (from Omonia)

Out: Note: Flags indicate national team as defined under FIFA eligibility rules; some limited exceptions apply. Players may hold more than one non-FIFA nationality.

No.	Pos.	Nation	Player
—	GK	CYP	Nikolas Asprogenous (loan return to Omonia)
—	DF	ESP	Álvaro Brachi (loan return to (Spain) RCD Espanyol B)
—	MF	ESP	Carles Coto (to (Georgia (country)) Dinamo Tbilisi)
—	FW	CPV	Cafú (to AEL Limassol)
—	MF	NGA	Richard Eromoigbe (to Alki Larnaca)
—	MF	SCO	Mark Fotheringham (released)
—	MF	SRB	Marko Ljubinković (to (Serbia) FK Vojvodina)
—	MF	GRE	Giannis Skopelitis (to AEK Larnaca)
—	FW	ARG	Emanuel Perrone (to (Greece) Asteras Tripolis)
—	DF	CYP	Loukas Stylianou (released)
—	FW	POR	Miguel Pedro (to (Portugal) C.D. Feirense)
—	MF	CYP	Christos Sotiriou (to Achyronas Liopetriou)
—	FW	CYP	Christoforos Christofi (on loan to Ethnikos Assia)
—	GK	BUL	Dimitar Ivankov (released)
—	FW	BUL	Emil Angelov (to (Bulgaria) PFC Beroe)

=== APOEL ===
In: Note: Flags indicate national team as defined under FIFA eligibility rules; some limited exceptions apply. Players may hold more than one non-FIFA nationality.

No.	Pos.	Nation	Player
—	MF	CYP	Achilleas Vasiliou (loan return from PAEEK FC)
12	MF	PAR	Aldo Adorno (from Apollon Limassol)
6	DF	BRA	Marcelo Oliveira (from (Greece) Atromitos)
5	MF	BIH	Sanel Jahić (from (Greece) AEK Athens)
78	GK	ESP	Urko Pardo (from (Romania) Rapid București)
73	DF	BRA	Kaká (on loan from (Germany) Hertha BSC)
18	MF	TUN	Tijani Belaid (from (England) Hull City)

Out: Note: Flags indicate national team as defined under FIFA eligibility rules; some limited exceptions apply. Players may hold more than one non-FIFA nationality.

No.	Pos.	Nation	Player
—	FW	POL	Adrian Sikora (to (Poland) Podbeskidzie Bielsko-Biała)
—	GK	CYP	Kyriacos Ioannou (to Doxa Katokopias)
—	DF	NED	Joost Broerse (to (Netherlands) SBV Excelsior)
—	FW	SRB	Nenad Mirosavljević (to Olympiakos Nicosia)
—	MF	CYP	Chrysis Michael (to Enosis Neon Paralimni)
—	DF	MKD	Boban Grnčarov (to (Belgium) Lierse S.K.)
—	MF	CYP	Demetris Kyriakou (to Anagennisi Dherynia)
—	MF	CYP	Marios Theodorou (on loan to Ethnikos Assia)
—	DF	CYP	Andreas Charalambous (on loan to Ethnikos Assia)
—	MF	CYP	Achilleas Vasiliou (on loan to Doxa Katokopias)
—	DF	GRE	Christos Kontis (Retired)

=== Apollon Limassol ===
In: Note: Flags indicate national team as defined under FIFA eligibility rules; some limited exceptions apply. Players may hold more than one non-FIFA nationality.

No.	Pos.	Nation	Player
—	DF	ARG	Federico Martorell (loan return from Ermis Aradippou)
—	FW	CYP	Stamatis Pantos (loan return from Akritas Chlorakas)
—	FW	NGA	Felix Ogbuke (loan return from (Poland) Legia Warszawa)
—	FW	MKD	Hristijan Kirovski (from (North Macedonia) FK Skopje)
—	DF	SRB	Milovan Sikimić (from (France) RC Strasbourg)
—	MF	FRA	Stéphane Noro (from (France) RC Strasbourg)
—	DF	BRA	Luciano Amaral (from (Portugal) C.S. Marítimo)
—	DF	CYP	Christos Theophilou (from AEK Larnaca)
—	MF	CZE	Miroslav Matušovič (from (Czech Republic) MFK Havířov)
—	MF	POR	Davide (from (Portugal) Associação Naval)
—	FW	POR	João Paulo (on loan from (Azerbaijan) Khazar Lankaran)
—	MF	SEN	Ousmane Cissokho (from (France) AJ Auxerre Reserves)
—	FW	CYP	Andreas Pittaras (from Ermis Aradippou)
—	DF	CYP	Stelios Demetriou (from Ermis Aradippou)
—	MF	GRE	Andreas Vasilogiannis (on loan from (Greece) Olympiacos)
—	MF	MAR	Rachid Hamdani (from (France) Clermont Foot)
—	FW	FRA	Helton Dos Reis (from (France) Grenoble Foot)

Out: Note: Flags indicate national team as defined under FIFA eligibility rules; some limited exceptions apply. Players may hold more than one non-FIFA nationality.

No.	Pos.	Nation	Player
—	DF	VEN	Raúl González (to Anagennisi Dherynia)
—	MF	ISR	Baruch Dego (to (Israel) Hapoel Ramat Gan)
—	DF	RSA	Nasief Morris (to (South Africa) SuperSport United)
—	MF	PAR	Aldo Adorno (to APOEL)
—	FW	SRB	Miljan Mrdaković (to AEK Larnaca)
—	MF	POL	Kamil Kosowski (to (Poland) GKS Bełchatów)
—	MF	ARG	Daniel Quinteros (retired)
—	FW	CPV	José Semedo (to Enosis Neon Paralimni)
—	DF	ARG	Federico Martorell (to (Venezuela) Deportivo Táchira)
—	FW	NGA	Felix Ogbuke (released)
—	FW	CYP	Stamatis Pantos (to Enosis Neon Parekklisia)

=== Aris Limassol ===
In: Note: Flags indicate national team as defined under FIFA eligibility rules; some limited exceptions apply. Players may hold more than one non-FIFA nationality.

No.	Pos.	Nation	Player
—	MF	BIH	Vladan Grujić (from AEP Paphos)
—	MF	BIH	Dušan Kerkez (from AEL Limassol)
—	MF	SRB	Predrag Lazić (from (Serbia) FK Sloboda Point Sevojno)
—	FW	ARG	Silvio González (from AEL Limassol)
—	FW	BRA	Gelson Rodrigues (from Ethnikos Achna)
—	FW	BRA	Ricardo Malzoni (from Omonia Aradippou)
—	GK	HUN	Zoltán Kovács (from (Hungary) Kaposvári RFC)
—	DF	SVK	Maroš Klimpl (from (Serbia) FK Sloboda Point Sevojno)
—	DF	SRB	Dragan Radosavljević (from (Serbia) FK Sloboda Point Sevojno)
—	MF	ROU	Claudiu Ionescu (from (Moldova) FC Milsami)

Out: Note: Flags indicate national team as defined under FIFA eligibility rules; some limited exceptions apply. Players may hold more than one non-FIFA nationality.

No.	Pos.	Nation	Player
—	DF	CYP	Pantelis Pitsillos (loan return to AEL Limassol)
—	FW	BRA	David (to APEP Pistilia)
—	MF	POR	Paulo Costa (released)
—	MF	SWE	Björn Enqvist (to POL/AEM Maroni)
—	GK	CYP	Demetris Stylianou (to Alki Larnaca)
—	FW	BEL	Jorrit D'Haeseleer (released)
—	MF	CYP	Andreas Kareklas (to Akritas Chlorakas)
—	FW	CYP	Demetris Kardanas (to Akritas Chlorakas)

=== Enosis Neon Paralimni ===
In: Note: Flags indicate national team as defined under FIFA eligibility rules; some limited exceptions apply. Players may hold more than one non-FIFA nationality.

No.	Pos.	Nation	Player
—	FW	FRA	Cédric Moukouri (from (France) UJA Alfortville)
—	FW	BRA	Sidnei (from (Portugal) Rio Ave)
—	MF	CYP	Chrysis Michael (from APOEL)
—	DF	COD	Mike Mampuya (from Doxa Katokopias)
—	FW	CYP	Onisiforos Roushias (from (England) Middlesbrough Reserves)
—	MF	SRB	Enver Alivodić (from (Serbia) BSK Borča)
—	MF	GRE	Kostas Kiassos (from (Greece) OFI)
—	FW	CPV	José Semedo (from Apollon Limassol)
—	DF	MAR	Tarik Bengelloun (from (Scotland) Greenock Morton)
—	FW	GHA	Shaibu Yakubu (from (Greece) OFI)

Out: Note: Flags indicate national team as defined under FIFA eligibility rules; some limited exceptions apply. Players may hold more than one non-FIFA nationality.

No.	Pos.	Nation	Player
—	DF	BEL	Laurent Fassotte (to Ermis Aradippou)
—	MF	CMR	Hervé Onana (loan return to (Belgium) Sint-Truidense V.V.)
—	FW	ZIM	Obadiah Tarumbwa (to APOP Kinyras Peyias)
—	DF	ENG	Michael Felgate (to Ayia Napa FC)
—	MF	ARG	Matías Escobar (to (Argentina) Club Atlético Tigre)
—	MF	BRA	Alex da Siva (to Omonia)
—	MF	CYP	Demos Goumenos (to Ermis Aradippou)
—	FW	MKD	Zoran Baldovaliev (to (Saudi Arabia) Najran SC)
—	FW	BEL	Dieter Van Tornhout (to Nea Salamina)
—	GK	CYP	Panayiotis Charalambous (to Anagennisi Dherynia)
—	MF	SLE	Abdul Rahman Kamara (to ASIL)
—	FW	CYP	Constantinos Constantinou (to APOP Kinyras Peyias)
—	DF	CYP	Constantinos Pris (to Omonia Aradippou)
—	DF	CYP	Demetris Moulazimis (on loan to Ermis Aradippou)

=== Ermis Aradippou ===
In: Note: Flags indicate national team as defined under FIFA eligibility rules; some limited exceptions apply. Players may hold more than one non-FIFA nationality.

No.	Pos.	Nation	Player
—	MF	CYP	Demos Goumenos (from Enosis Neon Paralimni)
—	DF	CYP	Angelis Charalambous (from (Scotland) Motherwell)
—	FW	FRA	Mickaël Antoine-Curier (from (Scotland) Hamilton Academical)
—	MF	BRA	Elias (from (Portugal) Portimonense S.C.)
—	FW	AUS	Danny Invincibile (from (Scotland) St Johnstone)
—	FW	ENG	Julian Gray (from (England) Walsall F.C.)
—	DF	GNB	Bruno Fernandes (from (Romania) Târgu Mureş)
—	GK	ALB	Arjan Beqaj (from Olympiakos Nicosia)
—	MF	MKD	Nikola Gligorov (from (North Macedonia) FK Rabotnički)
—	DF	CYP	Periklis Moustakas (from Doxa Katokopias)
—	DF	CYP	Apostolos Michael (from Onisilos Sotiras)
—	DF	CYP	Orthodoxos Ioannou (from AEK Larnaca)
—	MF	VEN	Héctor González (from Alki Larnaca)
—	GK	ENG	Corrin Brooks-Meade (from Alki Larnaca)
—	MF	EIR	Robbie Gibbons (from Alki Larnaca)
—	DF	ARG	Daniel Blanco (from Alki Larnaca)
—	DF	BEL	Laurent Fassotte (from Enosis Neon Paralimni)
—	MF	LBN	Zakaria Charara (from (Bahrain) Al-Shabab Club)
—	DF	URU	Rodrigo Gómez (from (Venezuela) Mineros de Guayana)
—	FW	BRA	Serjão (from AEL Limassol)
—	MF	POR	Saavedra (from AEK Larnaca)
—	FW	CYP	Marios Zannetou (from Enosis Neon Paralimni)
—	DF	CYP	Demetris Moulazimis (from Enosis Neon Paralimni)

Out: Note: Flags indicate national team as defined under FIFA eligibility rules; some limited exceptions apply. Players may hold more than one non-FIFA nationality.

No.	Pos.	Nation	Player
—	MF	CYP	Antonis Katsis (loan return to Omonia)
—	DF	ARG	Federico Martorell (loan return to Apollon Limassol)
—	FW	POR	Miguel Pedro (loan return to Anorthosis Famagusta)
—	MF	MOZ	Eduardo Jumisse (loan return to Portimonense)
—	FW	BRA	Evandro Roncatto (to Anorthosis Famagusta)
—	DF	ARG	Juan Gill (to (Venezuela) Estudiantes de Mérida)
—	MF	GLP	Matthieu Bemba (to (Netherlands) FC Emmen)
—	FW	BRA	Joeano (to (Portugal) F.C. Arouca)
—	DF	BUL	Yordan Petkov (retired)
—	DF	POR	Miguel Oliveira (to (Portugal) Moreirense)
—	MF	POR	Filipe Pastel (to (Portugal) Penafiel)
—	GK	SRB	Aleksandar Čanović (released)
—	DF	CYP	Constantinos Samaras (to Alki Larnaca)
—	GK	CYP	Athos Chrysostomou (to Ethnikos Achna)
—	FW	CYP	Andreas Pittaras (to Apollon Limassol)
—	MF	GEO	Levan Maghradze (to Ethnikos Achna)
—	FW	ENG	Julian Gray (to Nea Salamina)
—	FW	FRA	Mickaël Antoine-Curier (to Ethnikos Achna)
—	DF	GNB	Bruno Fernandes (to Alki Larnaca)
—	MF	MKD	Nikola Gligorov (to Alki Larnaca)
—	GK	ALB	Arjan Beqaj (retired)
—	MF	BRA	Wender (to Ethnikos Achna)
—	DF	CYP	Stelios Demetriou (to Apollon Limassol)
—	MF	POR	Sebastião Nogueira (to (Portugal) Atlético CP)
—	DF	CYP	Apostolos Michael (to Chalkanoras Idaliou)

=== Ethnikos Achna ===
In: Note: Flags indicate national team as defined under FIFA eligibility rules; some limited exceptions apply. Players may hold more than one non-FIFA nationality.

No.	Pos.	Nation	Player
—	FW	EST	Ats Purje (from AEP Paphos)
—	MF	SRB	Saša Stojanović (from (Israel) Hapoel Haifa)
—	DF	MNE	Nikola Vukčević (from (Montenegro) Budućnost Podgorica)
—	GK	CYP	Athos Chrysostomou (from Ermis Aradippou)
—	FW	FRA	Mickaël Antoine-Curier (from Ermis Aradippou)
—	MF	GEO	Levan Maghradze (from Ermis Aradippou)
—	MF	BRA	Wender (from Ermis Aradippou)
—	FW	CRO	Ivan Babić (from (Albania) KS Kastrioti)
—	FW	SRB	Marko Pavićević (from (Serbia) FK Sloboda Sevojno)
—	GK	LVA	Jevgēņijs Sazonovs (from Atromitos Yeroskipou)
—	DF	GRE	Giorgos Machlelis (from (Greece) Panathinaikos U-21)

Out: Note: Flags indicate national team as defined under FIFA eligibility rules; some limited exceptions apply. Players may hold more than one non-FIFA nationality.

No.	Pos.	Nation	Player
—	FW	MKD	Filip Ivanovski (to (North Macedonia) FK Vardar)
—	FW	BRA	Gelson Rodrigues (to Aris Limassol)
—	DF	MKD	Vanče Šikov (to (Ukraine) Volyn Lutsk)
—	DF	CYP	Christos Kotsonis (to Anagennisi Dherynia)
—	DF	POR	Luís Torres (to (Israel) Hapoel Be'er Sheva)
—	GK	CZE	Milan Zahálka (to Chalkanoras Idaliou)
—	MF	SRB	Ivan Petrović (to (Serbia) OFK Beograd)
—	DF	SRB	Predrag Ocokoljić (to (Serbia) FK Rad)
—	FW	SUI	Slaviša Dugić (to Othellos Athienou)
—	MF	AFG	Djelaludin Sharityar (released)
—	MF	BRA	Elias (to Ermis Aradippou)

=== Nea Salamina ===
In: Note: Flags indicate national team as defined under FIFA eligibility rules; some limited exceptions apply. Players may hold more than one non-FIFA nationality.

No.	Pos.	Nation	Player
—	MF	GRE	Christos Chatzipantelidis (from (Greece) Doxa Drama)
—	FW	CYP	Alekos Alekou (from AEK Larnaca)
—	DF	LBR	Solomon Grimes (from (Greece) Ethnikos Piraeus)
—	GK	ESP	Albert Marrama (from (Greece) Ilioupoli)
—	FW	BEL	Dieter Van Tornhout (from Enosis Neon Paralimni)
—	DF	CYP	Costas Adamou (from Adonis Idaliou)
—	DF	URU	Carlos García (from APEP Pitsilia)
—	DF	ESP	Iván Benítez (from Doxa Katokopias)
—	MF	CYP	Rafael Yiangoudakis (from APEP Pitsilia)
—	MF	GRE	Giorgos Lambropoulos (from AEK Larnaca)
—	MF	BRA	Cassiano (from (Brazil) São José-PA)
—	MF	GRE	Dimosthenis Manousakis (from (Greece) A.O. Trikala)
—	DF	SRB	Nino Pekarić (from (Serbia) RFK Novi Sad)
—	DF	CPV	Jimmy Modeste (from AEP Paphos)
—	MF	GHA	Imoro Lukman (from APOP Kinyras)
—	MF	ESP	Diego León (from (Germany) Wacker Burghausen)
—	MF	BIH	Branislav Nikić (from (Bosnia and Herzegovina) NK Zvijezda Gradačac)
—	FW	ENG	Julian Gray (from Ermis Aradippou)
—	MF	POR	Hélio Roque (on loan from AEL Limassol)

Out: Note: Flags indicate national team as defined under FIFA eligibility rules; some limited exceptions apply. Players may hold more than one non-FIFA nationality.

No.	Pos.	Nation	Player
—	DF	CYP	Kyriacos Kyriacou (loan return to AEK Larnaca)
—	MF	CYP	Liasos Louka (to AEP Paphos)
—	MF	CYP	Marios Louka (to AEK Kouklia)
—	DF	CYP	Nikos Nicolaou (to PAEEK FC)
—	MF	CYP	Theodoros Katsiaris (to POL/AEM Maroni)
—	DF	SVN	Jan Pahor (to (Slovenia) NK Ankaran)
—	MF	NGA	Joshua Izuchukwu (to APEP)
—	DF	CYP	Lambros Lambrou (released)
—	FW	SRB	Milan Belić (to (Serbia) Radnički Sombor)
—	FW	CYP	Andreas Koullouris (to Achironas Liopetri)
—	MF	POR	Rui Figueiredo (to (Portugal) Varzim S.C.)
—	FW	CYP	Kyriacos Chailis (to Omonia Aradippou)
—	MF	CYP	Antonis Panagi (to Omonia Aradippou)
—	MF	BRA	Cassiano (to (Brazil) São José-PA)
—	MF	GRE	Dimosthenis Manousakis (to (Greece) AEL Kalloni)

=== Olympiakos Nicosia ===
In: Note: Flags indicate national team as defined under FIFA eligibility rules; some limited exceptions apply. Players may hold more than one non-FIFA nationality.

No.	Pos.	Nation	Player
—	GK	LVA	Andrejs Pavlovs (from AEP Paphos)
—	DF	BRA	Marco Aurélio (from (Greece) Veria)
—	MF	VEN	César Castro (from (Greece) Panserraikos)
—	DF	ESP	Pablo Amo (from (Greece) Panserraikos)
—	FW	SRB	Nenad Mirosavljević (from APOEL)
—	DF	BIH	Delimir Bajić (from (Iran) Nassaji Mazandaran)
—	FW	SEN	Moussa Koita (from (Bulgaria) Chernomorets Burgas)

Out: Note: Flags indicate national team as defined under FIFA eligibility rules; some limited exceptions apply. Players may hold more than one non-FIFA nationality.

No.	Pos.	Nation	Player
—	GK	ALB	Isli Hidi (to AEL Limassol)
—	DF	POR	Júnior (retired)
—	MF	ANG	Dédé (to AEL Limassol)
—	DF	BRA	Carlos André (to (Portugal) C.D. Tondela)
—	FW	POR	João Paulo (to (Azerbaijan) Khazar Lankaran)
—	DF	BRA	Rodrigo (released)
—	MF	CYP	Andreas Alcibiades (on loan to PAEEK FC)
—	DF	CYP	Panayiotis Panayiotou (to Chalkanoras Idaliou)
—	FW	CYP	Valantis Kapartis (on loan to Chalkanoras Idaliou)

=== Omonia ===
In: Note: Flags indicate national team as defined under FIFA eligibility rules; some limited exceptions apply. Players may hold more than one non-FIFA nationality.

No.	Pos.	Nation	Player
—	MF	CYP	Antonis Katsis (loan return from Ermis Aradippou)
—	GK	CYP	Nikolas Asprogenous (loan return from Anorthosis Famagusta)
—	MF	CYP	Ioannis Chadjivasilis (from Atromitos Yeroskipou)
—	MF	BRA	Alex da silva (from Enosis Neon Paralimni)
—	GK	URU	Damián Frascarelli (from APOP Kinyras Peyias)
—	FW	CRO	Josip Tadić (from (Germany) Arminia Bielefeld)
—	MF	POR	Renato Margaça (from AEK Larnaca)
—	MF	SUI	Vero Salatic (from (Switzerland) Grasshopper)
—	DF	ALG	Sofiane Cherfa (from (France) Châteauroux)
—	FW	ANG	Freddy (from AEL Limassol)

Out: Note: Flags indicate national team as defined under FIFA eligibility rules; some limited exceptions apply. Players may hold more than one non-FIFA nationality.

No.	Pos.	Nation	Player
—	GK	CYP	Nikolas Asprogenous (to AEP Paphos)
—	DF	CYP	Elias Charalambous (to Alki Larnaca)
—	FW	COD	Lomana LuaLua (to (England) Blackpool)
—	MF	CYP	Antonis Katsis (On loan to Alki Larnaca)
—	DF	ESP	Víctor Espasandín (released)
—	MF	CYP	Giorgos Panagi (to Alki Larnaca)
—	DF	GER	Timo Wenzel (to (Greece) Kerkyra)
—	MF	ESP	José Manuel Rueda (to (Spain) Xerez CD)
—	FW	CYP	Theodosis Kyprou (On loan to Chalkanoras Idaliou)
—	FW	CYP	Michalis Konstantinou (to Anorthosis Famagusta)
—	FW	CRO	Josip Tadić (to (Poland) Lechia Gdańsk)

== Cypriot Second Division ==
=== AEP Paphos ===
In: Note: Flags indicate national team as defined under FIFA eligibility rules; some limited exceptions apply. Players may hold more than one non-FIFA nationality.

No.	Pos.	Nation	Player
—	DF	SEN	Momo Coly (from APOP Kinyras Peyias)
—	DF	SEN	Gora Tall (from APOP Kinyras Peyias)
—	MF	CYP	Alexandros Garpozis (from AEL Limassol)
—	GK	CYP	Nikolas Asprogenous (from Omonia)
—	GK	HUN	Zsolt Sebők (from (Hungary) Videoton FC)
—	MF	CYP	Liasos Louka (from Nea Salamina)
—	FW	CYP	Charalambos Pittakas (from APEP)
—	FW	GHA	Lloyd Owusu (from (England) Luton Town)
—	FW	POR	Cascavel (from (Portugal) Penafiel)
—	MF	POR	Miguel Vargas (from AEL Limassol)
—	DF	CYP	Loizos Kakoyiannis (from AEL Limassol)
—	FW	BUL	Dormushali Saidhodzha (from (Bulgaria) PFC Lokomotiv Sofia)

Out: Note: Flags indicate national team as defined under FIFA eligibility rules; some limited exceptions apply. Players may hold more than one non-FIFA nationality.

No.	Pos.	Nation	Player
—	GK	LVA	Andrejs Pavlovs (to Olympiakos Nicosia)
—	FW	POR	Bernardo Vasconcelos (to Alki Larnaca)
—	DF	POR	Santamaria (to Alki Larnaca)
—	FW	ARG	David Solari (to Alki Larnaca)
—	MF	ESP	Jonathan Aspas (to Alki Larnaca)
—	FW	EST	Ats Purje (to Ethnikos Achnas)
—	MF	BEL	Fangio Buyse (to Akritas Chlorakas)
—	MF	CYP	Thanasis Athanasiou (to Akritas Chlorakas)
—	FW	BUL	Ventsislav Ivanov (to (Bulgaria) Minyor Pernik)
—	DF	GHA	Ransford Addo (released)
—	GK	EST	Artur Kotenko (to (Azerbaijan) Ravan Baku)
—	DF	CPV	Jimmy Modeste (to Nea Salamina)
—	FW	GHA	Lloyd Owusu (to (England) Barnet)

=== Akritas Chlorakas ===
In: Note: Flags indicate national team as defined under FIFA eligibility rules; some limited exceptions apply. Players may hold more than one non-FIFA nationality.

No.	Pos.	Nation	Player
—	MF	CYP	Andreas Kareklas (from Aris Limassol)
—	FW	CYP	Demetris Kardanas (from Aris Limassol)
—	DF	CYP	Michalis Constantinou (from PAEEK FC)
—	DF	CYP	Michalis Paschali (from Digenis Akritas Morphou)
—	MF	POR	Tiago Rosado (from ENAD Polis Chrysochous)
—	MF	CYP	Thanasis Athanasiou (from AEP Paphos)
—	MF	BEL	Fangio Buyse (from AEP Paphos)
—	FW	GRE	Ioannis Sotiroglou (from APOP Kinyras Peyias)
—	DF	CYP	Giorgos Constanti (free agent)
—	DF	FRA	Mamadou Diawara (from (France) Clermont Foot B)
—	FW	POR	Ivan Forbes (free agent)
—	GK	BUL	Vladimir Dimitrov (from (Bulgaria) Sportist Svoge)
—	FW	ITA	Marco Tagbajumi (from PAEEK FC)
—	FW	POR	Vivaldo (from Doxa Katokopias)

Out: Note: Flags indicate national team as defined under FIFA eligibility rules; some limited exceptions apply. Players may hold more than one non-FIFA nationality.

No.	Pos.	Nation	Player
—	DF	CYP	Stelios Demetriou (to Ermis Aradippou)
—	MF	CYP	Constantinos Kissonergis (to Enosis Neon Parekklisia)
—	FW	POR	Milton (to PAEEK FC)
—	GK	POR	José Eduardo (to APOP Kinyras Peyias)
—	FW	GRE	Ioannis Sotiroglou (to THOI Lakatamias)
—	MF	POR	Tiago Rosado (to Karmiotissa Polemidion)

=== APEP Pitsilia ===
In: Note: Flags indicate national team as defined under FIFA eligibility rules; some limited exceptions apply. Players may hold more than one non-FIFA nationality.

No.	Pos.	Nation	Player
—	DF	CYP	Stelios Longras (from Chalkanoras Idaliou)
—	GK	CYP	Demetris Leoni (free agent)
—	DF	RWA	Lewis Aniweta (from APOP Kinyras Peyias)
—	MF	ESP	Juanjo (from ASIL)
—	DF	POR	Nuno Rodrigues (from Othellos Athienou)
—	MF	NGA	Joshua Izuchukwu (from Nea Salamina)
—	FW	GNB	Dionísio (from (Portugal) Torreense)

Out: Note: Flags indicate national team as defined under FIFA eligibility rules; some limited exceptions apply. Players may hold more than one non-FIFA nationality.

No.	Pos.	Nation	Player
—	FW	SLE	Allie Andrew (loan return to AEL Limassol)
—	GK	CYP	Simos Tsiakkas (to AEL Limassol)
—	DF	CYP	Kyriakos Pelendritis (loan return to AEL Limassol)
—	DF	CYP	Rafael Panayiotou (to Enosis Neon Parekklisia)
—	DF	URU	Carlos García (to Nea Salamina)
—	DF	CYP	Rafael Yiangoudakis (to Nea Salamina)
—	FW	CYP	Charalambos Pittakas (to AEP Paphos)

=== APOP Kinyras Peyias ===
In: Note: Flags indicate national team as defined under FIFA eligibility rules; some limited exceptions apply. Players may hold more than one non-FIFA nationality.

No.	Pos.	Nation	Player
—	FW	ZIM	Edward Mashinya (from Omonia Aradippou)
—	DF	GRE	Theodoros Galanis (from Atromitos Yeroskipou)
—	FW	POR	Vieirinha (from (Portugal) Gondomar S.C.)
—	GK	POR	José Eduardo (from Akritas Chlorakas)
—	DF	CYP	Stefanos Matsoukas (from N & S Erimis)
—	MF	CYP	Pavlos Pafitis (from AEL Limassol)
—	FW	CYP	Vyronas Neofytou (from AEZ Zakakiou)
—	FW	POR	Ricardo Catchana (from (Portugal) Mafra)
—	GK	GRE	Ioannis Riganas (from (Greece) Rodos)
—	FW	POR	Riera (from FC Andorra)
—	DF	CYP	Christos Constantinou (from Ayia Napa)
—	FW	CYP	Constantinos Constantinou (to Enosis Neon Paralimni)
—	DF	POR	Ginho (from (Portugal) Penafiel)
—	FW	CYP	Giorgos Loizou (from Adonis Idaliou)
—	MF	FRA	Jimmy Dechêne (from (France) Besançon RC)
—	FW	ZIM	Obadiah Tarumbwa (from Enosis Neon Paralimni)
—	DF	CYP	Kyriacos Kyriacou (from AEK Larnaca)

Out: Note: Flags indicate national team as defined under FIFA eligibility rules; some limited exceptions apply. Players may hold more than one non-FIFA nationality.

No.	Pos.	Nation	Player
—	MF	CYP	Kyriacos Pavlou (to AEK Larnaca)
—	DF	POR	Miguel Ângelo (to (Portugal) F.C. Arouca)
—	FW	NGA	Jeremiah Ani (to (Malta) Sliema Wanderers)
—	DF	SEN	Momo Coly (to AEP Paphos)
—	DF	SEN	Gora Tall (to AEP Paphos)
—	GK	URU	Damián Frascarelli (to Omonia)
—	MF	POR	Manuel Lopes (to Doxa Katokopia)
—	FW	GRE	Ioannis Sotiroglou (to Akritas Chlorakas)
—	GK	CYP	Andreas Karseras (to Atromitos Yeroskipou)
—	DF	RWA	Lewis Aniweta (to APEP Pitsilia)
—	MF	GHA	Imoro Lukman (to Nea Salamina)
—	FW	HUN	Thomas Sowunmi (to (Hungary) BFC Siófok)
—	FW	POR	Vieirinha (released)
—	MF	CYP	Stavros Christodoulou (to Akritas Chlorakas)
—	FW	CYP	Vyronas Neofytou (released)

=== Atromitos Yeroskipou ===
In: Note: Flags indicate national team as defined under FIFA eligibility rules; some limited exceptions apply. Players may hold more than one non-FIFA nationality.

No.	Pos.	Nation	Player
—	MF	CYP	Marios Ioannou (from PAEEK FC)
—	MF	CYP	Christos Nicolaou (from APEP)
—	MF	MLI	Manuel Kanté (from (Switzerland) FC Baulmes)
—	DF	BIH	Nikola Mikelini (from (Romania) Astra Ploieşti)
—	DF	BUL	Dimitar Nakov (from (Bulgaria) Pirin Blagoevgrad)
—	FW	CYP	Christos Makris (from AEK Kouklia)
—	MF	BUL	Asparuh Vasilev (from (Bulgaria) Akademik Sofia)
—	MF	SVN	Jalen Pokorn (from (Slovenia) Triglav Kranj)
—	FW	COD	Tcham N'Toya (from (Israel) Maccabi Ahi Nazareth)
—	FW	BUL	Borislav Hazurov (from (Bulgaria) Bansko)
—	GK	CYP	Andreas Karseras (from APOP Kinyras Peyias)
—	GK	SVK	Marek Prošovský (from (Slovakia) Rimavská Sobota)
—	GK	LVA	Artūrs Vaičulis (from AEL Limassol)
—	GK	CYP	Marios Savva (on loan from AEK Kouklia)

Out: Note: Flags indicate national team as defined under FIFA eligibility rules; some limited exceptions apply. Players may hold more than one non-FIFA nationality.

No.	Pos.	Nation	Player
—	FW	CYP	Angelos Perikleous (loan return to AEL Limassol)
—	MF	CYP	Demos Sokratous (loan return to Omonia)
—	MF	CYP	Ioannis Chadjivasilis (to Omonia)
—	GK	POR	Alemão (to Othellos Athienou)
—	MF	CYP	Panayiotis Assiotis (to Enosis Neon Parekklisia)
—	FW	MAR	Hicham Chirouf (to Omonia Aradippou)
—	DF	GRE	Theodoros Galanis (to APOP Kinyras Peyias)
—	GK	LVA	Jevgēņijs Sazonovs (to Ethnikos Achna)
—	MF	LVA	Viktors Morozs (to PAEEK FC)
—	GK	CYP	Andreas Karseras (released)
—	GK	CYP	Christos Efstathiou (to AEK Kouklia)
—	GK	LVA	Artūrs Vaičulis (released)

=== Ayia Napa ===
In: Note: Flags indicate national team as defined under FIFA eligibility rules; some limited exceptions apply. Players may hold more than one non-FIFA nationality.

No.	Pos.	Nation	Player
—	MF	GRE	Spiros Kontopoulos (from ASIL Lysi)
—	MF	HUN	Lajos Terjék (from Anagennisi Derynia)
—	DF	CYP	Antonis Moushis (from Omonia Aradippou)
—	FW	CYP	Martinos Solomou (from Onisilos Sotira)
—	FW	CYP	Christos Pierettis (from PAEEK FC)
—	MF	CYP	Panayiotis Kosma (from Anagennisi Derynia)
—	MF	POR	Ludgero (from (Portugal) A.D. Camacha)
—	DF	ENG	Michael Felgate (from Enosis Neon Paralimni)

Out: Note: Flags indicate national team as defined under FIFA eligibility rules; some limited exceptions apply. Players may hold more than one non-FIFA nationality.

No.	Pos.	Nation	Player
—	DF	CYP	Christos Constantinou (to APOP Kinyras Peyias)

=== Chalkanoras Idaliou ===
In: Note: Flags indicate national team as defined under FIFA eligibility rules; some limited exceptions apply. Players may hold more than one non-FIFA nationality.

No.	Pos.	Nation	Player
—	MF	CYP	Antonis Antoniou (from Digenis Akritas Morphou)
—	MF	CYP	Christos Panayiotou (from PAEEK FC)
—	FW	CYP	Valantis Kapartis (on loan from Olympiakos Nicosia)
—	MF	ROU	Marian Stan (from (Romania) Astra Giurgiu)
—	MF	CYP	Adamos Rodosthenous (from Adonis Idaliou)
—	DF	CYP	Marios Theophanous (from Omonia Aradippou)
—	MF	CYP	Feidias Panayiotou (free agent)
—	MF	CYP	Kyriacos Stylianou (from PAEEK FC)
—	GK	CZE	Milan Zahálka (from Ethnikos Achna)
—	FW	LVA	Aleksejs Koļesņikovs (from Othellos Athienou)
—	FW	CYP	Theodosis Kyprou (on loan from Omonia)
—	DF	CYP	Panayiotis Panayiotou (from Olympiakos Nicosia)
—	DF	CYP	Apostolos Michael (from Ermis Aradippou)

Out: Note: Flags indicate national team as defined under FIFA eligibility rules; some limited exceptions apply. Players may hold more than one non-FIFA nationality.

No.	Pos.	Nation	Player
—	MF	CYP	Michalis Demetriou (loan return to AEK Larnaca)
—	FW	CYP	Andreas Pittaras (loan return to Ermis Aradippou)
—	MF	CYP	Marios Themistokleous (retired)
—	DF	CYP	Stelios Longras (to APEP Pitsilia)
—	MF	SEN	Hanne Tanou (released)
—	DF	SCO	Jamie McKenzie (released)
—	DF	CYP	Sotiris Ptinis (to PAEEK FC)
—	GK	ARG	Ramiro González (to Ethnikos Assia)

=== Doxa Katokopia ===
In: Note: Flags indicate national team as defined under FIFA eligibility rules; some limited exceptions apply. Players may hold more than one non-FIFA nationality.

No.	Pos.	Nation	Player
—	GK	POR	Jorge (from (Portugal) Gondomar)
—	DF	POR	Tiago Conceição (from (Portugal) Real Sport Clube)
—	DF	POR	Gonçalo Costa (from (Portugal) Mafra)
—	DF	POR	Éder (from (Portugal) Mafra)
—	MF	POR	Cuco (from (Portugal) C.D. Aves)
—	MF	POR	João Pedro (from (Portugal) Gondomar)
—	MF	POR	Pedro Mendes (from (Portugal) Gondomar)
—	MF	POR	Hardy Pinto (from (England) Dorchester Town)
—	FW	POR	Bonifácio (from (Portugal) Mafra)
—	GK	CYP	Kyriacos Ioannou (from APOEL)
—	FW	POR	Dani Rodrigues (from Omonia Aradippou)
—	FW	POR	Vivaldo (from (Portugal) G.D.R. Monsanto)
—	DF	POR	Diogo Vila (on loan from (Portugal) Padroense)
—	DF	POR	Bruno Silva (from (Portugal) Académica Coimbra)
—	DF	POR	Abel Pereira (on loan from (Portugal) Benfica)
—	MF	GRE	Ioannis Konti (from (Greece) Zakynthos F.C.)
—	MF	MOZ	Manuel Lopes (from APOP Kinyras Peyias)
—	FW	CYP	Achilleas Vasiliou (on loan from APOEL)
—	FW	ROU	Lucian Pârvu (from (Romania) CS Otopeni)
—	MF	FRA	Maxime Larroque (from AEL Limassol)
—	DF	CMR	William Modibo (from (Portugal) Arouca)
—	MF	ARG	Esteban Sachetti (from (Spain) CD San Fernando)
—	MF	SWE	Nino Osmanagić (from (Sweden) Norrby IF)
—	FW	GNB	Adul Baldé (from (Portugal) Pinhalnovense)

Out: Note: Flags indicate national team as defined under FIFA eligibility rules; some limited exceptions apply. Players may hold more than one non-FIFA nationality.

No.	Pos.	Nation	Player
—	MF	POR	Saavedra (loan return to AEK Larnaca)
—	MF	CYP	Georgios Eleftheriou (to AEL Limassol)
—	FW	ESP	Arnal (to Alki Larnaca)
—	DF	ESP	Iván Benítez (to Nea Salamina)
—	GK	SRB	Igor Kojić (to (Portugal) Santa Clara)
—	DF	CYP	Periklis Moustakas (to Ermis Aradippou)
—	DF	GRE	Demetris Maris (to Omonia Aradippou)
—	DF	COD	Mike Mampuya (to Enosis Neon Paralimni)
—	MF	GAM	Seyfo Soley (to Alki Larnaca)
—	GK	HUN	Zoltán Nagy (to Omonia Aradippou)
—	DF	ESP	Paco Borrego (to (Spain) Elche)
—	MF	GRE	Ioannis Konti (released)
—	FW	POR	Vivaldo (to Akritas Chlorakas)
—	DF	POR	Diogo Vila (on loan to AEK Larnaca)

=== Enosis Neon Parekklisia ===
In: Note: Flags indicate national team as defined under FIFA eligibility rules; some limited exceptions apply. Players may hold more than one non-FIFA nationality.

No.	Pos.	Nation	Player
—	DF	CYP	Giorgos Kanellas (from MEAP Nisou)
—	MF	CYP	Constantinos Kissonergis (from Akritas Chlorakas)
—	DF	CYP	Kyriakos Pelendritis (from APEP)
—	DF	CYP	Rafael Panayiotou (from APEP)
—	MF	CYP	Panayiotis Assiotis (from Atromitos Yeroskipou)
—	MF	CYP	Demos Sokratous (from AC Omonia)
—	GK	CYP	Charalambos Kairinos (from AEL Limassol)
—	FW	CYP	Stamatis Pantos (from Apollon Limassol)

Out: Note: Flags indicate national team as defined under FIFA eligibility rules; some limited exceptions apply. Players may hold more than one non-FIFA nationality.

No.	Pos.	Nation	Player

=== Ethnikos Assia ===
In: Note: Flags indicate national team as defined under FIFA eligibility rules; some limited exceptions apply. Players may hold more than one non-FIFA nationality.

No.	Pos.	Nation	Player
—	DF	GRE	Demetris Ignatiadis (from Digenis Akritas Morphou)
—	FW	CYP	Christoforos Christofi (on loan from Anorthosis Famagusta)
—	GK	ARG	Ramiro González (from (Scotland) Montrose F.C.)
—	MF	CYP	Marios Theodorou (on loan from APOEL)
—	DF	CYP	Andreas Charalambous (on loan from APOEL)
—	DF	CYP	Demetris Daskalakis (from PAEEK FC)
—	MF	CYP	Adamos Efstathiou (from Omonia Aradippou)

Out: Note: Flags indicate national team as defined under FIFA eligibility rules; some limited exceptions apply. Players may hold more than one non-FIFA nationality.

No.	Pos.	Nation	Player

=== Omonia Aradippou ===
In: Note: Flags indicate national team as defined under FIFA eligibility rules; some limited exceptions apply. Players may hold more than one non-FIFA nationality.

No.	Pos.	Nation	Player
—	DF	CYP	Michalis Michael (from AEK Larnaca)
—	DF	GRE	Demetris Maris (from Doxa Katokopias)
—	FW	CYP	Constantinos Georgiades (from Adonis Idaliou)
—	FW	MAR	Hicham Chirouf (from Atromitos Yeroskipou)
—	GK	HUN	Zoltán Nagy (from Doxa Katokopias)
—	MF	GNB	Rodilson (from Onisilos Sotira)
—	FW	CYP	Andreas Kyprianou (from (Greece) Ionikos)
—	DF	CYP	Constantinos Pris (from Enosis Neon Paralimni)
—	DF	NED	Stanley Tailor (from (Netherlands) AGOVV Apeldoorn)
—	MF	CYP	Antonis Panagi (from Nea Salamina)

Out: Note: Flags indicate national team as defined under FIFA eligibility rules; some limited exceptions apply. Players may hold more than one non-FIFA nationality.

No.	Pos.	Nation	Player
—	GK	CYP	Panayiotis Kythreotis (loan return to AEK Larnaca)
—	FW	BRA	Ricardo Malzoni (to Aris Limassol)
—	FW	CYP	Kyriakos Panteli (released)
—	MF	ROU	Marian Galbenu (to Digenis Voroklinis)
—	DF	CYP	Antonis Moushis (to Ayia Napa FC)
—	FW	ZIM	Edward Mashinya (to APOP Kinyras Peyias)
—	FW	POR	Dani Rodrigues (to Doxa Katokopias)
—	DF	CYP	Marios Theophanous (to Chalkanoras Idaliou)

=== Onisilos Sotira ===
In: Note: Flags indicate national team as defined under FIFA eligibility rules; some limited exceptions apply. Players may hold more than one non-FIFA nationality.

No.	Pos.	Nation	Player
—	FW	CYP	Tziovannis Siepis (from Frenaros FC)
—	DF	POL	Paweł Odrzywolski (from (Poland) MKS Kluczbork)
—	MF	GRE	Spiros Kontopoulos (from Ayia Napa FC)
—	DF	BUL	Kristian Uzunov (from (Bulgaria) FK Akademik Sofia)
—	DF	CMR	Maurice Hongla (from (Malta) Sannat Lions F.C.)
—	FW	SVK	Richard Chorvatovič (from (Slovakia) ŠK SFM Senec)

Out: Note: Flags indicate national team as defined under FIFA eligibility rules; some limited exceptions apply. Players may hold more than one non-FIFA nationality.

No.	Pos.	Nation	Player
—	DF	CYP	Apostolos Michael (to Ermis Aradippou)
—	FW	CYP	Martinos Solomou (to Ayia Napa FC)
—	FW	CYP	Chrysostomos Chrysostomou (to Othellos Athienou)
—	MF	GNB	Rodilson (to Omonia Aradippou)

=== Othellos Athienou ===
In: Note: Flags indicate national team as defined under FIFA eligibility rules; some limited exceptions apply. Players may hold more than one non-FIFA nationality.

No.	Pos.	Nation	Player
—	GK	POR	Alemão (from Atromitos Yeroskipou)
—	FW	POL	Mateusz Fryc (from (Poland) ZKS Granat Skarżysko)
—	FW	CYP	Chrysostomos Chrysostomou (from Onisilos Sotira)
—	FW	POL	Adrian Mielec (from (Poland) Rozwój Katowice)
—	FW	SUI	Slaviša Dugić (from Ethnikos Achna)

Out: Note: Flags indicate national team as defined under FIFA eligibility rules; some limited exceptions apply. Players may hold more than one non-FIFA nationality.

No.	Pos.	Nation	Player
—	FW	COD	Ngola Mbella (to PAEEK FC)
—	DF	CYP	Petros Petrou (released)
—	DF	POR	Nuno Rodrigues (to APEP Pitsilia)
—	FW	POR	Sérgio Grilo (released)
—	GK	BUL	Abdi Abdikov (released)
—	FW	LVA	Aleksejs Koļesņikovs (to Chalkanoras Idaliou)
—	FW	POL	Rafał Wiącek (to (Poland) Wisła Puławy)

=== PAEEK ===
In: Note: Flags indicate national team as defined under FIFA eligibility rules; some limited exceptions apply. Players may hold more than one non-FIFA nationality.

No.	Pos.	Nation	Player
—	FW	COD	Ngola Mbella (from Othellos Athienou)
—	FW	POR	Milton (from Akritas Chlorakas)
—	DF	CYP	Nikos Nicolaou (from Nea Salamina)
—	MF	CYP	Marios Zachariou (from Alki Larnaca)
—	DF	CYP	Sotiris Ptinis (from Chalkanoras Idaliou)
—	FW	ITA	Marco Tagbajumi (from (Portugal) A.D. Camacha)
—	MF	POR	Joca (from (Spain) Lorca Atlético)
—	DF	ENG	Netan Sansara (from (England) Corby Town)
—	MF	GER	Pascal Nägele (from (Spain) Levante UD B)
—	MF	LVA	Viktors Morozs (from Atromitos Yeroskipou)

Out: Note: Flags indicate national team as defined under FIFA eligibility rules; some limited exceptions apply. Players may hold more than one non-FIFA nationality.

No.	Pos.	Nation	Player
—	MF	CYP	Achilleas Vasiliou (loan return to APOEL)
—	MF	CYP	Christos Panayiotou (to Chalkanoras Idaliou)
—	DF	CYP	Demetris Daskalakis (to Ethnikos Assia)
—	MF	CYP	Kyriacos Stylianou (to Chalkanoras Idaliou)
—	MF	CYP	Marios Ioannou (to Atromitos Yeroskipou)
—	MF	CYP	Kyriacos Charalambous (to ASIL Lysi)
—	FW	CYP	Christos Pierettis (to Ayia Napa FC)
—	DF	CYP	Michalis Constantinou (to Akritas Chlorakas)
—	FW	ITA	Marco Tagbajumi (to Akritas Chlorakas)
—	MF	CYP	Marios Zachariou (released)

== See also ==
- (Bulgaria) List of Bulgarian football transfers summer 2011
- (Netherlands) List of Dutch football transfers summer 2011
- (England) List of English football transfers summer 2011
- (Malta) List of Maltese football transfers summer 2011
- (Germany) List of German football transfers summer 2011
- (Greece) List of Greek football transfers summer 2011
- (Portugal) List of Portuguese football transfers summer 2011
- (Spain) List of Spanish football transfers summer 2011
- (Latvia) List of Latvian football transfers summer 2011
- (Serbia) List of Serbian football transfers summer 2011
