= 2007–08 APOEL FC season =

APOEL
2007–08 season
- Chairman: Kyriakos Zivanaris
- Manager: Marinos Ouzounidis (Until 6 January 2008); Ivan Jovanović (From 8 January 2008)
- Stadium: GSP Stadium, Nicosia
- Cypriot First Division: 2nd
- Cypriot Cup: Winners
- Cyprus FA Shield: Runners-up
- UEFA Champions League: First qualifying round
- Top goalscorer: League: Constantinos Makrides (13); All: Constantinos Makrides (15)
- Highest home attendance: 17,446 vs Omonia (8 December 2007)
- Lowest home attendance: 373 vs Aris Limassol (30 January 2008)
- Average home league attendance: 6,445 (all competitions)
Home colours	Away colours	Third colours

The 2007–08 season was APOEL's 68th season in the Cypriot First Division and 80th year in existence as a football club.

The club won the championship the previous season so it played in the UEFA Champions League qualifiers.

Manager Marinos Ouzounidis left the club by mutual consent on 6 January 2008, due to the club's lower-than-expected performance in the Cypriot First Division and two days later he was replaced by Ivan Jovanović who managed to help the club to win the Cypriot Cup at the end of the season.

== Squad ==
Last update: 16 April 2008

Note: Flags indicate national team as defined under FIFA eligibility rules; some limited exceptions apply. Players may hold more than one non-FIFA nationality.

No.	Pos.	Nation	Player
1	GK	CYP	Michalis Morfis
4	DF	GRE	Michalis Kapsis
5	DF	ROU	Daniel Florea
7	MF	CYP	Constantinos Charalambides
8	DF	FRA	Bark Seghiri
9	FW	GRE	Nikos Machlas
11	MF	CYP	Marios Louka
12	GK	MKD	Jane Nikolovski
14	DF	NED	Joost Broerse
15	DF	CYP	Marios Antoniades
17	MF	CYP	Marinos Satsias (captain)
18	DF	CYP	Demetris Daskalakis
20	MF	CYP	Constantinos Makrides

No.	Pos.	Nation	Player
23	MF	POR	Helio Pinto
24	DF	GRE	Christos Kontis
26	DF	POR	Nuno Morais
30	FW	SRB	Nenad Mirosavljević
31	FW	BRA	Zé Carlos
32	DF	ALB	Altin Haxhi
33	MF	CYP	Chrysis Michael
40	MF	CYP	Giorgos Economides
60	GK	CYP	Kyriacos Ioannou
69	FW	SRB	Nemanja Corović
71	MF	CYP	Marios Theodorou
77	DF	CYP	Panayiotis Panayiotou
88	GK	CYP	Tasos Kissas

=== Squad changes ===
In:

No.	Pos.	Nat.	Name	Age	EU	Moving from	Type	Transfer window	Ends	Transfer fee	Source
26	DM	(Portugal)	Morais	23	EU	Chelsea (England)	Transfer ✓	Summer	2009	Free	reuters.com
12	GK	(North Macedonia)	Nikolovski	33	Non-EU	Slaven Belupo (Croatia)	Transfer ✓	Summer	2009	Free	—
6	DM	(Brazil)	Emerson	35	EU	AEK Athens (Greece)	Transfer ✓	Summer	2008	Free	uefacup.com
21	LW	(Brazil)	Tavares	23	Non-EU	Porto Alegre (Brazil)	Transfer ✓	Summer	2010	Free	—
14	CF	(Brazil)	Evilasio	27	Non-EU	Porto Alegre (Brazil)	Transfer ✓	Summer	2008	Free	—
31	CF	(Brazil)	Zé Carlos	32	EU	Braga (Portugal)	Transfer ✓	Summer	2009	Free	uefa.com
7	RW	(Brazil)	Rubens	22	Non-EU	Villa Rio (Brazil)	Loan →	Summer	2008	Free	—
69	CF	(Serbia)	Corović	31	Non-EU	AEL Limassol	Loan →	Summer	2008	Free	—
32	LB	(Albania)	Haxhi	32	EU	Ergotelis (Greece)	Transfer ✓	Winter	2009	Free	—
14	CB	(Netherlands)	Broerse	28	EU	Utrecht (Netherlands)	Transfer ✓	Winter	2009	Free	nu.nl
30	CF	(Serbia)	Mirosavljević	30	Non-EU	Smederevo (Serbia)	Transfer ✓	Winter	2009	Free	—
7	RW	(Cyprus)	Charalambides	26	EU	Carl Zeiss Jena (Germany)	Transfer ✓	Winter	2010	Free	—

Total expenditure: ▼€0

Out:

No.	Pos.	Nat.	Name	Age	EU	Moving to	Type	Transfer window	Transfer fee	Source
9	LW	(Costa Rica)	Gómez	32	Non-EU	Deportivo Saprissa (Costa Rica)	Loan return →	Summer	—	—
99	CF	(Cyprus)	Neophytou	30	EU	AEK Larnaca	End of contract ✗	Summer	Free	—
22	LB	(Cyprus)	Sampson	25	EU	AEL Limassol	End of contract ✗	Summer	Free	—
29	CF	(Argentina)	Solari	26	EU	UNAM (Mexico)	Transfer ✓	Summer	€200K	—
6	CB	(Cyprus)	Okkarides	29	EU	Apollon Limassol	End of contract ✗	Summer	Free	—
12	GK	(Cyprus)	Kythreotis	26	EU	ASIL Lysi	End of contract ✗	Summer	Free	—
7	RW	(Peru)	Barreto	24	Non-EU	Universidad San Martín (Peru)	Mutual consent ✗	Summer	Free	—
14	CF	(Brazil)	Evilasio	27	Non-EU	Pelita Bandung Raya (Indonesia)	Contract termination ✗	Winter	Free	—
19	RB	(Cyprus)	Elia	28	EU	Ethnikos Achna	Loan →	Winter	Free	—
7	RW	(Brazil)	Rubens	23	Non-EU	Villa Rio (Brazil)	Loan return →	Winter	—	—
21	LW	(Brazil)	Tavares	23	Non-EU	Maribor (Slovenia)	Mutual consent ✗	Winter	Free	—
22	LM	(Greece)	Sapanis	31	EU	Ionikos (Greece)	Mutual consent ✗	Winter	Free	—
6	DM	(Brazil)	Emerson	35	EU	Madureira (Brazil)	Mutual consent ✗	Winter	Free	—
10	AM	(Portugal)	Fernandes	29	EU	Metalurh Donetsk (Ukraine)	Transfer ✓	Winter	€200K	—

Total income: ▲€400K

Last updated: 31 January 2008

== Club ==
=== Management ===
Position	Staff
Manager	(Serbia) (Greece) Ivan Jovanović
Assistant manager	(Cyprus) Yiannos Ioannou
Team manager	(Cyprus) Michalis Hadjipieris
Goalkeeping coach	(Albania) Foto Strakosha
Fitness coach	(Cyprus) Petros Papapetrou
Team doctor	(Cyprus) Costas Schizas

Last updated: 16 April 2008
Source: apoelfc.com.cy

=== Kit ===
Supplier: Lotto
Sponsor(s): MTN

Home	Away	Third

Source: apoelfc.com.cy

=== Other information ===
Chairman	(Cyprus) Kyriakos Zivanaris
Ground (capacity and dimensions)	GSP Stadium (22,859 / 105x68 m)

Source: apoelfc.com.cy

== Competitions ==
=== Overall ===
Competition	Started round	Final position / round	First match	Last match
Marfin Laiki League	—	2nd	2 September 2007	10 May 2008
UEFA Champions League	1st qualifying	1st qualifying	17 July 2007	24 July 2007
Cypriot Cup	4th round	Winners	24 October 2007	17 May 2008
Cyprus FA Shield	Final	Runners-up	25 August 2008	

Updated to match played 20 May 2008
Source: Competitions

=== Marfin Laiki League ===
==== Classification ====
Pos	Team	Pld	W	D	L	GF	GA	GD	Pts	Qualification or relegation
1	Anorthosis Famagusta	26	19	7	0	49	13	+36	64	Qualification for second round, Group A
2	APOEL	26	16	5	5	51	19	+32	53	Qualification for second round, Group A
3	Omonia	26	14	6	6	36	22	+14	48	Qualification for second round, Group A
4	AEK Larnaca	26	12	5	9	34	32	+2	41	Qualification for second round, Group A
5	Apollon Limassol	26	10	9	7	40	33	+7	39	Qualification for second round, Group B

Source: soccerway.com

==== Results summary ====
Overall								Home						Away					
Pld	W	D	L	GF	GA	GD	Pts	W	D	L	GF	GA	GD	W	D	L	GF	GA	GD
32	18	7	7	58	28	+30	61	12	2	2	33	10	+23	6	5	5	25	18	+7

Last updated: 11 May 2008.
Source: soccerway.com

==== Results by round ====
Round	1	2	3	4	5	6	7	8	9	10	11	12	13	14	15	16	17	18	19	20	21	22	23	24	25	26	27	28	29	30	31	32
Ground	H	A	H	A	H	H	A	H	A	H	A	H	A	A	H	A	H	A	A	H	A	H	A	H	A	H	A	H	A	H	H	A
Result	W	L	W	L	W	W	D	W	W	W	D	W	D	D	L	D	L	W	W	W	W	W	W	W	L	W	W	D	L	W	D	L

Updated to match(es) played on 11 May 2008. Source: apoelfc.com.cy
A = Away; H = Home; W = Win; D = Draw; L = Loss

==== Playoffs table ====
The first 12 teams are divided into 3 groups. Points are carried over from the first round.

==== Group A ====
Pos	Team	Pld	W	D	L	GF	GA	GD	Pts	Qualification
1	Anorthosis Famagusta (C)	32	20	12	0	58	19	+39	72	Qualification for Champions League first qualifying round
2	APOEL	32	18	7	7	58	28	+30	61	Qualification for UEFA Cup first qualifying round
3	Omonia	32	14	10	8	42	31	+11	52	Qualification for UEFA Cup first qualifying round
4	AEK Larnaca	32	14	8	10	46	42	+4	50	

(C) Champions

=== Matches ===
All times for the Domestic Competitions at EET

==== Regular season ====
2 September 2007
19:30

APOEL	3–2	Doxa
Machlas 53', 70'; Michael 71' (pen.)	Report	Da Costa 26', 84'

GSP Stadium, Nicosia
Attendance: 7,950
Referee: Panikos Andronikou

15 September 2007
20:00

Anorthosis	1–0	APOEL
Nikolaou 57'	Report

Antonis Papadopoulos Stadium, Larnaca
Attendance: 7,922
Referee: Panayiotis Gerasimou

23 September 2007
19:00

APOEL	4–0	APOP Kinyras
Michael 14', 71' (pen.); Makrides 30'; Machlas 42'	Report

GSP Stadium, Nicosia
Attendance: 6,549
Referee: Harris Glykis

29 September 2007
18:00

EN Paralimni	1–0	APOEL
Eleftheriou 44'	Report

Tasos Markos Stadium, Paralimni
Attendance: 2,332
Referee: Panikos Andronikou

7 October 2007
18:00

APOEL	3–1	Nea Salamis
Satsias 65'; Machlas 68'; Fernandes 79'	Report	Dolores 63'

GSP Stadium, Nicosia
Attendance: 6,934
Referee: Panikos Andronikou

21 October 2007
19:00

APOEL	2–0 Awarded (Note: Match abandoned (at 2–0) after 46 minutes due to rioting by Apollon fans. APOEL awarded the match with the existing (before interruption) 2–0 score.)	Apollon
Pinto 30'; Machlas 36'	Report

GSP Stadium, Nicosia
Attendance: 10,389
Referee: Stelios Trifonos

28 October 2007
18:00

Olympiakos	2–2	APOEL
González 27'; Panigutti 67'	Report	Machlas 50'; Makrides 74'

GSP Stadium, Nicosia
Attendance: 6,844
Referee: Antonis Constantinides

4 November 2007
18:00

APOEL	1–0	AEK
Makrides 55' (pen.)	Report

GSP Stadium, Nicosia
Attendance: 6,576
Referee: Leontios Trattou

11 November 2007
18:00

Alki	0–4	APOEL
	Report	Machlas 21', 59'; Makrides 67'; Fernandes 70'

Ammochostos Stadium, Larnaca
Attendance: 1,951
Referee: Harris Glykis

25 November 2007
17:30

APOEL	2–1	Ethnikos Achna
Kontis 16'; Michael 74'	Report	Georgiades 59'

GSP Stadium, Nicosia
Attendance: 6,931
Referee: Leontios Trattou

2 December 2007
18:00

Aris	2–2	APOEL
Mihalcea 62'; Seper 75'	Report	Makrides 13'; Michael 90+5' (pen.)

Tsirion Stadium, Limassol
Attendance: 2,456
Referee: Petros Panayides

8 December 2007
19:00

APOEL	1–0	Omonia
Makrides 16' (pen.)	Report

GSP Stadium, Nicosia
Attendance: 17,446
Referee: Stelios Trifonos

15 December 2007
19:00

AEL	1–1	APOEL
Tiquinho 62'	Report	Pinto 43'

Tsirion Stadium, Limassol
Attendance: 5,645
Referee: Marios Tsaggaris

22 December 2007
17:00

Doxa	2–2	APOEL
Kamal 52'; Da Costa 88'	Report	Daskalakis 11'; Makrides 38' (pen.)

Makario Stadium, Nicosia
Attendance: 3,850
Referee: Antonis Constantinides

5 January 2008
19:00

APOEL	0–1	Anorthosis
	Report	Skopelitis 90+1'

GSP Stadium, Nicosia
Attendance: 12,968
Referee: Costas Kapitanis

12 January 2008
17:00

APOP Kinyras	1–1	APOEL
Efthymiou 90+2'	Report	Corović 84'

Peyia Municipal Stadium, Peyia, Paphos
Attendance: 1,670
Referee: Stelios Tryfonos

20 January 2008
18:00

APOEL	0–1	EN Paralimni
	Report	Freddy 45'

GSP Stadium, Nicosia
Attendance: 4,256
Referee: Marios Panayi

26 January 2008
19:00

Nea Salamis	1–3	APOEL
Louka 83' (pen.)	Report	Zé Carlos 36', 45', 59'

Ammochostos Stadium, Larnaca
Attendance: 807
Referee: Marios Tsaggaris

2 February 2008
17:00

Apollon	0–2 Awarded (Note: Match abandoned (at 2–2) after 90+8 minutes due attack to the referee by Apollon players and pitch invasion by Apollon fans. APOEL awarded a 2–0 win.)	APOEL
Risso 30' (pen.); Torresi 32'	Report	Zé Carlos 19'; Michael 90+3' (pen.)

Tsirion Stadium, Limassol
Attendance: 5,676
Referee: Marios Stamatis

10 February 2008
16:30

APOEL	4–0	Olympiakos
Corović 19'; Makrides 44'; Broerse 86'; Charalambides 89'	Report

GSP Stadium, Nicosia
Attendance: 5,554
Referee: Panayiotis Gerasimou

13 February 2008
18:00

AEK	0–3	APOEL
	Report	Zé Carlos 58', 67'; Makrides 81'

GSZ Stadium, Larnaca
Attendance: 3,500
Referee: Christos Ilia

26 February 2008
19:00

APOEL	3–0	Alki
Machlas 15'; Broerse 86'; Satsias 90+2'	Report

GSP Stadium, Nicosia
Attendance: 3,976
Referee: Marios Tsaggaris

1 March 2008
15:00

Ethnikos Achna	0–2	APOEL
	Report	Machlas 23'; Makrides 79'

Dasaki Stadium, Achna, Famagusta
Attendance: 1,300
Referee: Harris Glykis

8 March 2008
17:00

APOEL	3–0	Aris
Charalambides 45', 88'; Louka 72'	Report

GSP Stadium, Nicosia
Attendance: 3,884
Referee: Panikos Andronikou

15 March 2008
19:00

Omonia	2–1	APOEL
Cafú 21'; Maris 78'	Report	Mirosavljević 36'

GSP Stadium, Nicosia
Attendance: 15,789
Referee: Christos Ilia

23 February 2008
18:00

APOEL	2–0	AEL
Makrides 52' (pen.), 67'	Report

GSP Stadium, Nicosia
Attendance: 4,993
Referee: Stelios Tryfonos

==== Playoffs ====
29 March 2008
17:30

Omonia	1–2	APOEL
Kaiafas 21' (pen.)	Report	Michael 42' (pen.); Charalambides 80'

GSP Stadium, Nicosia
Attendance: 11,306
Referee: Georgios Kasnaferis

6 April 2008
18:00

APOEL	1–1	Anorthosis
Zé Carlos 90+2'	Report	Nikolaou 82'

GSP Stadium, Nicosia
Attendance: 10,027
Referee: Michalis Koukoulakis

12 April 2008
19:00

AEK	1–0	APOEL
Paiva 85'	Report

GSZ Stadium, Larnaca
Attendance: 925
Referee: Leontios Trattou

20 April 2008
18:00

APOEL	2–1	AEK
Michael 62' (pen.); Mirosavljević 73'	Report	Adorno 82'

Antonis Papadopoulos Stadium, Larnaca (Note: Match played in a neutral stadium because APOEL handed stadium ban after their supporters displayed a banner with racist content in a previous game.)
Attendance: 2,740
Referee: Yiannis Anastasiou

3 May 2008
19:00

APOEL	2–2	Omonia
Makrides 33'; Kontis 69'	Report	Kaseke 31'; Chailis 54'

GSP Stadium, Nicosia
Attendance: 3,693
Referee: Panayiotis Gerasimou

10 May 2008
19:00

Anorthosis	3–0	APOEL
Sosin 9', 49', 58'	Report

Antonis Papadopoulos Stadium, Larnaca
Attendance: 3,000
Referee: Marios Tsaggaris

=== UEFA Champions League ===
==== First qualifying round ====
17 July 2007
19:00 CET

APOEL (Cyprus)	2–0	(Belarus) BATE Borisov
Michael 42' (pen.); Machlas 61'	Report

GSP Stadium, Nicosia
Attendance: 10,971
Referee: Olivier Thual

24 July 2007
17:00 CET

BATE Borisov (Belarus)	3–0 (a.e.t.)	(Cyprus) APOEL
Stasevich 14'; Platonaw 74'; Bliznyuk 104'	Report

Gorodskoi Stadion, Borisov
Attendance: 4,500
Referee: William Collum

BATE won 3–2 on aggregate.

=== Cyprus FA Shield ===
25 August 2007
20:00 EET

APOEL	1–2	Anorthosis
Pinto 68'	Report	Boaventura 17'; Nicolaou 59' (pen.)

GSP Stadium, Nicosia
Attendance: 5,356
Referee: Iraklis Tsikinidis

=== Cypriot Cup ===
==== Fourth round ====
24 October 2007
18:00 EET

APOEL	6–0	Olympos Xylofagou
Tavares 7', 52'; Corović 43'; Fernandes 73'; Makrides 76'	Report

GSP Stadium, Nicosia
Attendance: 1,322
Referee: Demetris Demetriou

31 October 2007
14:00 EET

Olympos Xylofagou	0–3	APOEL
	Report	Tavares 42'; Corović 60'; Sapanis 78'

GSZ Stadium, Larnaca
Attendance: 39
Referee: Yiannakis Ioannou

APOEL won 9–0 on aggregate.

==== Group B ====
Final table
Pos	Team	Pld	W	D	L	GF	GA	GD	Pts	Qualification
1	Anorthosis (A)	6	4	2	0	10	4	+6	14	Advanced to Semi-Finals
2	APOEL (A)	6	3	2	1	9	4	+5	11	Advanced to Semi-Finals
3	Ayia Napa (B)	6	2	0	4	6	12	−6	6	
4	Aris Limassol (A)	6	1	0	5	9	14	−5	3	

Rules for classification: 1) Points; 2) Head-to-head points; 3) Head-to-head goal difference; 4) Head-to-head away goals scored; 5) Goal difference; 6) Goals scored.
5 December 2007
18:00 EET

Anorthosis	1–1	APOEL
Sosin 84' (pen.)	Report	Satsias 50' (pen.)

Antonis Papadopoulos Stadium, Larnaca
Attendance: 3,000
Referee: Panikos Andronikou

19 December 2007
16:30 EET

APOEL	3–1	Ayia Napa
Torres 2'; Sapanis 18'; Tavares 27'	Report	Skourides 79'

GSP Stadium, Nicosia
Attendance: 936
Referee: Yiannis Anastasiou

16 January 2008
18:30 EET

Aris	0–2	APOEL
	Report	Louka 35'; Torres 90+2'

Tsirion Stadium, Limassol
Attendance: 246
Referee: Yiannis Anastasiou

30 January 2008
18:30 EET

APOEL	3–1	Aris
Corović 37'; Mirosavljević 88', 90+1'	Report	Alekou 74'

GSP Stadium, Nicosia
Attendance: 373
Referee: Demetris Demetriou

2 April 2008
18:00 EET

APOEL	0–0	Anorthosis
	Report

GSP Stadium, Nicosia
Attendance: 1,757
Referee: Leontios Trattou

16 April 2008
17:00 EET

Ayia Napa	1–0	APOEL
Achilleos 33'	Report

Tasos Markou Stadium, Paralimni, Famagusta
Attendance: 15
Referee: Stelios Zafiris

==== Semi-finals ====
30 April 2008
17:30 EET

Omonia	2–1	APOEL
Mguni 8'; Pletsch 33'	Report	Makrides 80'

GSP Stadium, Nicosia
Attendance: 11,920
Referee: Ilias Mazarakos

7 May 2008
17:30 EET

APOEL	2–0	Omonia
Michael 41'; Mirosavljević 72'	Report

GSP Stadium, Nicosia
Attendance: 12,737
Referee: Georgios Kasnaferis

APOEL won 3–2 on aggregate.

==== Final ====
17 May 2008
20:00 EET

APOEL	2–0	Anorthosis
Morais 53'; Mirosavljević 76'	Report

GSP Stadium, Nicosia
Attendance: 20,280
Referee: Dimitris Kalopoulos

APOEL won the 2007–08 Cypriot Cup (19th title).
