= Evilásio =

Evilásio is a Portuguese masculine given name, mainly found in Brazil.

== People ==
- pt:Evilásio Neri Caon (1929), Brazilian lawyer and journalist
- pt:Evilásio Tenorio (1950), bishop of Recife, Brazil
- pt:Evilásio Cavalcante Farias (1952), Brazilian politician
- Evilásio Leite da Costa, Brazilian footballer
- Duas Caras Brazilian TV soap character Evilásio Caó
