= List of English football transfers winter 2006–07 =

This is a list of English football transfers for the 2006–07 season. Only moves from the Premier League and Championship, as well as any other prominent moves from the lower leagues, are listed.

The winter transfer window opened on 1 January 2006, with a few transfers taking place prior to that date. Players without a club could join one, either during or in between transfer windows. Clubs below Premier League level could also sign players on loan at any time. If need be, clubs could sign a goalkeeper on an emergency loan, if all others were unavailable.

== Post-window signings ==
Date	Name	Nat	Moving from	Moving to	Fee
1 September 2006	Olivier Bernard	(France)	Unattached (Note: Previous club: Rangers)	Newcastle United	Free
4 September 2007	Andy Webster	(Scotland)	(Scotland) Hearts	Wigan Athletic	Undisclosed
8 September 2006	Stéphane Henchoz	(Switzerland)	Unattached (Note: Previous club: Wigan Athletic)	Blackburn Rovers	Free
12 September 2006	Didier Agathe	(France)	Unattached (Note: Previous club: Celtic)	Aston Villa	Free
14 September 2006	Danny Mills	(England)	Manchester City	Hull City	Two-month loan
29 September 2006	Pavel Srníček	(Czech Republic)	Unattached (Note: Previous club: Beira-Mar)	Newcastle United	Free
29 September 2006	Lee Hendrie	(England)	Aston Villa	Stoke City	Two-month loan
3 October 2006	Chris Sutton	(England)	Unattached (Note: Previous club: Birmingham City)	Aston Villa	Free
27 October 2006	Chris Kirkland	(England)	Liverpool	Wigan Athletic	Undisclosed
27 October 2006	Graham Stack	(Republic of Ireland)	Reading	Leeds United	Three-month loan
14 December 2006	Gábor Király	(Hungary)	Crystal Palace	Aston Villa	One-month loan

== January transfer window ==
Date	Name	Nat	Moving from	Moving to	Fee
1 January 2007	Andreas Granqvist	(Sweden)	(Sweden) Helsingborg	Wigan Athletic	Three-month loan
1 January 2007	Stephan Andersen	(Denmark)	Charlton Athletic	(Norway) Brøndby	Undisclosed
1 January 2007	Zheng Zhi	(China)	(China) Shandong Luneng	Charlton Athletic	Five-month loan
1 January 2007	Kristofer Hæstad	(Norway)	(Norway) IK Start	Wigan Athletic	Five-month loan
1 January 2007	Michael Kightly	(England)	Grays Athletic	Wolverhampton Wanderers	Nominal fee
1 January 2007	Michael McIndoe	(Scotland)	Barnsley	Wolverhampton Wanderers	£250k
1 January 2007	Ade Akinbiyi	(Nigeria)	Sheffield United	Burnley	£750k
2 January 2007	Henrik Larsson	(Sweden)	(Sweden) Helsingborg	Manchester United	Ten-week loan
2 January 2007	Moses Ashikodi	(Antigua and Barbuda)	(Scotland) Rangers	Watford	Nominal fee
2 January 2007	Adel Taarabt	(France)	(France) Lens	Tottenham Hotspur	Season-long loan
2 January 2007	Ben Alnwick	(England)	Sunderland	Tottenham Hotspur	£900k
2 January 2007	Márton Fülöp	(Hungary)	Tottenham Hotspur	Sunderland	£500k
2 January 2007	Liam Lawrence	(England)	Sunderland	Stoke City	£500k
2 January 2007	Carlos Edwards	(Trinidad and Tobago)	Luton Town	Sunderland	£1.5m
3 January 2007	Tore André Flo	(Norway)	Unattached (Note: Previous club: Valerenga)	Leeds United	Free
4 January 2007	Vincenzo Montella	(Italy)	(Italy) AS Roma	Fulham	Six-month loan
4 January 2007	Luke Chadwick	(England)	Stoke City	Norwich City	£200k
4 January 2007	David Jones	(England)	Manchester United	Derby County	£1m
5 January 2007	Luís Boa Morte	(Portugal)	Fulham	West Ham United	Undisclosed
5 January 2007	Lee Williamson	(England)	Rotherham United	Watford	£1m (Note: Combined fee)
5 January 2007	Will Hoskins	(England)	Rotherham United	Watford	£1m
5 January 2007	David Unsworth	(England)	Sheffield United	Wigan Athletic	Free
5 January 2007	Neill Collins	(Scotland)	Sunderland	Wolverhampton Wanderers	£150k
5 January 2007	Andy Webster	(Scotland)	Wigan Athletic	(Scotland) Rangers	Five-month loan
8 January 2007	Paul Ifill	(Barbados)	Sheffield United	Crystal Palace	£750k
8 January 2007	Phil Bardsley	(England)	Manchester United	Aston Villa	Five-month loan
8 January 2007	Anthony Stokes	(Republic of Ireland)	Arsenal	Sunderland	£2m
8 January 2007	Matthew Kilgallon	(England)	Leeds United	Sheffield United	£1.75m
8 January 2007	Nigel Quashie	(Scotland)	West Bromwich Albion	West Ham United	£1.5m
9 January 2007	Rory Delap	(Republic of Ireland)	Sunderland	Stoke City	Free
10 January 2007	Clint Dempsey	(United States)	(United States) Major League Soccer (New England Revolution) (Note: In Major League Soccer, all player contracts are owned by the league, not by individual teams.)	Fulham	£2m
11 January 2007	Mike Pollitt	(England)	Wigan Athletic	Burnley	Five-month loan
11 January 2007	Arnold Mvuemba	(France)	(France) Rennes	Portsmouth	Five-month loan
11 January 2007	Jonathan Stead	(England)	Sunderland	Sheffield United	£750k
11 January 2007	Djimi Traoré	(Mali)	Charlton Athletic	Portsmouth	£1m
11 January 2007	Peter Whittingham	(England)	Aston Villa	Cardiff City	Undisclosed
11 January 2007	Gary Teale	(Scotland)	Wigan Athletic	Derby County	£600k
11 January 2007	Ben Thatcher	(Wales)	Manchester City	Charlton Athletic	£500k
11 January 2007	Rowan Vine	(England)	Luton Town	Birmingham City	Undisclosed
11 January 2007	Stephen Pearson	(Scotland)	(Scotland) Celtic	Derby County	£750k
12 January 2007	Alan Thompson	(England)	(Scotland) Celtic	Leeds United	Five-month loan
12 January 2007	Eric Djemba-Djemba	(Cameroon)	Aston Villa	Burnley	Five-month loan
15 January 2007	Mamadou Seck	(Senegal)	(France) Le Havre	Sheffield United	Free
15 January 2007	Luton Shelton	(Jamaica)	(Sweden) Helsingborg	Sheffield United	£2m
16 January 2007	David Weir	(Scotland)	Everton	(Scotland) Rangers	Free
17 January 2007	David Dunn	(England)	Birmingham City	Blackburn Rovers	Undisclosed
17 January 2007	David Marshall	(Scotland)	(Scotland) Celtic	Norwich City	Five-month loan
17 January 2007	Dean Windass	(England)	Bradford City	Hull City	Five-month loan
18 January 2007	Calum Davenport	(England)	Tottenham Hotspur	West Ham United	Undisclosed
18 January 2007	Giuseppe Rossi	(Italy)	Manchester United	(Italy) Parma	Five-month loan
18 January 2007	Matthew Spring	(England)	Watford	Luton Town	£200k
18 January 2007	Darren Potter	(England)	Liverpool	Wolverhampton Wanderers	Undisclosed
18 January 2007	Lauren	(Cameroon)	Arsenal	Portsmouth	£500k
19 January 2007	Dominic Matteo	(Scotland)	Blackburn Rovers	Stoke City	Free
19 January 2007	Andy Griffin	(England)	Portsmouth	Stoke City	Five-month loan
22 January 2007	Joey Guðjónsson	(Iceland)	(Netherlands) AZ Alkmaar	Burnley	£150k
22 January 2007	Milan Baroš	(Czech Republic)	Aston Villa	(France) Lyon	Undisclosed (Note: Milan Baros swapped for John Carew, with and undisclosed fee being paid for each)
22 January 2007	John Carew	(Norway)	(France) Lyon	Aston Villa	Undisclosed
22 January 2007	Stephen Warnock	(England)	Liverpool	Blackburn Rovers	Undisclosed
22 January 2007	Kepa Blanco	(Spain)	Sevilla	West Ham United	Five-month loan
22 January 2007	Lucas Neill	(Australia)	Blackburn Rovers	West Ham United	Undisclosed
23 January 2007	Neil Shipperley	(England)	Sheffield United	Brentford	Free (Note: Contract with Sheffield United terminated on 15 January.)
23 January 2007	Leon Knight	(England)	(Wales) Swansea City	Milton Keynes Dons	Undisclosed
23 January 2007	Ricardo Rocha	(Portugal)	(Portugal) Benfica	Tottenham Hotspur	Undisclosed
23 January 2007	Ashley Young	(England)	Watford	Aston Villa	£9.65m
24 January 2007	Simon Davies	(Wales)	Everton	Fulham	Undisclosed
24 January 2007	Jordy Brouwer	(Netherlands)	(Netherlands) Ajax	Liverpool	Undisclosed
24 January 2007	Ahmed Fathi	(Egypt)	(Egypt) Ismaily	Sheffield United	£700k
24 January 2007	Claudio Reyna	(United States)	Manchester City	(United States) Major League Soccer (New York Red Bulls)	Free
25 January 2007	Lee Dong-Gook	(South Korea)	(South Korea) Pohang Steelers	Middlesbrough	Undisclosed
25 January 2007	Ugo Ehiogu	(England)	Middlesbrough	(Scotland) Rangers	Free
25 January 2007	Christopher Samba	(Democratic Republic of the Congo)	(Germany) Hertha Berlin	Blackburn Rovers	Undisclosed
25 January 2007	Salif Diao	(Senegal)	Liverpool	Stoke City	Free
26 January 2007	Steve Kabba	(England)	Sheffield United	Watford	£500k
26 January 2007	Mikkel Andersen	(Denmark)	(Denmark) Akademisk Boldklub	Reading	Undisclosed
27 January 2007	Alexey Smertin	(Russia)	(Russia) Dynamo Moscow	Fulham	Undisclosed
28 January 2007	Madjid Bougherra	(Algeria)	Sheffield Wednesday	Charlton Athletic	£2.5m
29 January 2007	Stern John	(Trinidad and Tobago)	Coventry City	Sunderland	Undisclosed
29 January 2007	Jay McEveley	(Scotland)	Blackburn Rovers	Derby County	£600k
29 January 2007	Manuel Fernandes	(Portugal)	(Portugal) Benfica	Everton	Five-month loan
29 January 2007	Oliver Bozanic	(Australia)	(Australia) Central Coast Mariners	Reading	Free
29 January 2007	Alan Bennett	(Republic of Ireland)	(Republic of Ireland) Cork City	Reading	Undisclosed
30 January 2007	Edgar Davids	(Netherlands)	Tottenham Hotspur	(Netherlands) Ajax	Undisclosed
30 January 2007	Alexandre Song	(Cameroon)	Arsenal	Charlton Athletic	Five-month loan
30 January 2007	David Prutton	(England)	Southampton	Nottingham Forest	Five-month loan
30 January 2007	Bruno Berner	(Switzerland)	(Switzerland) Basel	Blackburn Rovers	Undisclosed
30 January 2007	Oguchi Onyewu	(United States)	(Belgium) Standard Liège	Newcastle United	Five-month loan
30 January 2007	Massimo Maccarone	(Italy)	Middlesbrough	(Italy) Siena	Free
30 January 2007	Julius Aghahowa	(Nigeria)	(Ukraine) Shakhtar Donetsk	Wigan Athletic	Undisclosed
30 January 2007	Lee Hendrie	(England)	Aston Villa	Stoke City	Five-month loan
30 January 2007	Dean Kiely	(Republic of Ireland)	Portsmouth	West Bromwich Albion	Free
30 January 2007	Björn Runström	(Sweden)	Fulham	Luton Town	One-month loan
30 January 2007	Marek Saganowski	(Poland)	(France) Troyes	Southampton	Five-month loan
30 January 2007	Greg Halford	(England)	Colchester United	Reading	Undisclosed
31 January 2007	Sebastian Larsson	(Sweden)	Arsenal	Birmingham City	£1m
31 January 2007	Gareth Williams	(Scotland)	Leicester City	Watford	Undisclosed
31 January 2007	Craig Fleming	(England)	Norwich City	Rotherham United	Free
31 January 2007	Michael Ball	(England)	(Netherlands) PSV Eindhoven	Manchester City	Undisclosed
31 January 2007	Russell Hoult	(England)	West Bromwich Albion	Stoke City	Free
31 January 2007	Reto Ziegler	(Switzerland)	Tottenham Hotspur	(Italy) Sampdoria	Five-month loan
31 January 2007	Geoff Horsfield	(England)	Sheffield United	Leicester City	Five-month loan
31 January 2007	Michael Duberry	(England)	Stoke City	Reading	Undisclosed
31 January 2007	Matthew Upson	(England)	Birmingham City	West Ham United	£6m
31 January 2007	Jon Macken	(Republic of Ireland)	Crystal Palace	Derby County	Free
31 January 2007	Pavel Pergl	(Czech Republic)	(Czech Republic) Sparta Prague	Preston North End	Five-month loan
31 January 2007	Wayne Henderson	(Republic of Ireland)	Brighton & Hove Albion	Preston North End	£150k
31 January 2007	Seyfo Soley	(The Gambia)	(Belgium) K.R.C. Genk	Preston North End	Five-month loan
31 January 2007	Johan Cavalli	(France)	(France) Istres	Watford	Free
31 January 2007	Álvaro Arbeloa	(Spain)	(Spain) Deportivo La Coruña	Liverpool	£2.6m
31 January 2007	Shaun Maloney	(Scotland)	(Scotland) Celtic	Aston Villa	£1.1m
31 January 2007	David Thompson	(England)	Portsmouth	Bolton Wanderers	Undisclosed
31 January 2007	Tyrone Mears	(England)	West Ham United	Derby County	Five-month loan
31 January 2007	Jonathan Fortune	(England)	Charlton Athletic	Stoke City	Five-month loan
31 January 2007	Javier Mascherano	(Argentina)	West Ham United	Liverpool	Undisclosed (Note: Move agreed on deadline day, but not ratified until 20 February 2007)

== Post-window deals ==
Date	Name	Nat	Moving from	Moving to	Fee
19 February 2007	Jemal Johnson	(United States)	Wolverhampton Wanderers	Leeds United	Loan

== See also ==
- List of English football transfers Summer 2007
