= Christos Kotsonis =

Cypriot footballer (born 1976)

Personal information
- Full name: Christos Kotsonis
- Date of birth: June 13, 1976 (age 50)
- Place of birth: Famagusta, Cyprus
- Height: 1.76 m (5 ft 9 in)
- Position: Midfielder

Team information
- Current team: Anagennisi Dherynia
- Number: 6

Senior career*
Years	Team	Apps	(Gls)
1996–2004	Anorthosis Famagusta	132	(9)
1998–1999	Enosis Neon Paralimni → loan	20	(0)
2002	Ethnikos Achnas → loan	4	(0)
2004–2005	AEK Larnaca	18	(0)
2005–2011	Ethnikos Achnas	115	(2)
2011–2012	Anagennisi Dherynia	19	(0)

International career^{‡}
2000–2002	Cyprus	6	(0)
- * Club domestic league appearances and goals as of 23 March 2012 ‡ National team caps and goals as of July 2009

Christos Kotsonis (born June 13, 1976, in Cyprus) is a Cypriot midfielder who plays for Anagennisi Dherynia. His former teams are Anorthosis Famagusta, Enosis Neon Paralimni and AEK Larnaca.
