= Georgios Lampropoulos =

Greek footballer

Personal information
- Full name: Georgios Lampropoulos
- Date of birth: 26 October 1984 (age 42)
- Place of birth: Athens, Greece
- Position: Midfielder

Team information
- Current team: Ilisiakos
- Number: 25

Youth career
- 2005–2006: Chaidari

Senior career*
Years	Team	Apps	(Gls)
2006	Egaleo	4	(0)
2006–2009	Chaidari	?	(?)
2009–2011	AEK Larnaca	48	(4)
2011–2013	Nea Salamina	68	(11)
2013–2014	Levadiakos	14	(1)
2014–2015	Nea Salamina	21	(2)
2015–2016	Ayia Napa	22	(2)
2017–	Ilisiakos		
- * Club domestic league appearances and goals as of 23:39, 24 October 2015 (UTC)

Georgios Lampropoulos (born 26 October 1984) is a Greek football midfielder who plays for Ilisiakos. He started his career at Haidari, and he also played for Egaleo, Haidari, AEK Larnaca and Nea Salamina.
