= José Eduardo (footballer, born 1981) =

Portuguese footballer

Personal information
- Full name: José Eduardo da Silva Barbosa Alves
- Date of birth: 24 March 1981 (age 45)
- Place of birth: Famalicão, Portugal
- Height: 1.87 m (6 ft 2 in)
- Position: Goalkeeper

Youth career
- 1990–1991: Famalicão
- 1991–2000: Porto

Senior career*
Years	Team	Apps	(Gls)
2000–2002	Porto B	32	(0)
2002–2003	Portimonense	0	(0)
2003	Pampilhosa	18	(0)
2004	Progresul București	0	(0)
2004–2006	Hapoel Jerusalem	11	(0)
2007–2008	Aves	1	(0)
2008–2010	Penafiel	50	(0)
2010–2011	Akritas Chlorakas	24	(0)
2011–2012	APOP	24	(0)
2012–2013	Akritas Chlorakas	10	(0)
2013–2014	Finikas	15	(0)
2015–2016	ENAD	4	(0)
Total		189	(0)
- * Club domestic league appearances and goals

José Eduardo da Silva Barbosa Alves (born 24 March 1981 in Vila Nova de Famalicão, Braga District), known as José Eduardo, is a Portuguese former footballer who played as a goalkeeper.
