= Mustapha Ndaw =

Gambian footballer

Personal information
- Date of birth: 15 November 1981 (age 44)
- Place of birth: Gambia
- Height: 1.97 m (6 ft 6 in)
- Position: Striker

Senior career*
Years	Team	Apps	(Gls)
1998–1999	Real de Banjul	?	(?)
1999–2002	Anderlecht	0	(0)
2000–2001	→ FCV Dender EH (loan)	10	(3)
2003	B71 Sandoy	4	(3)
2004–2005	KAA Gent	?	(?)
2006	B68 Toftir	3	(2)
2007	AEK Larnaca	24	(3)
2007	Doxa Katokopia	11	(2)
2008–2009	Veria	25	(3)
2009	Enosis Neon Paralimni	10	(1)
2010	Teteks Tetovo	8	(0)

International career^{‡}
2007	Gambia	3	(0)
- * Club domestic league appearances and goals as of July 8, 2010 ‡ National team caps and goals as of July 8, 2010

Mustapha Ndaw (born 15 November 1981) is a Gambian international football forward.

== Club career ==
Ndaw Begin playing still in Gambia with Real de Banjul where he was spotted by R.S.C. Anderlecht that bought him in 1999. He ended up playing mostly for the Anderlecht B team, besides the loan during the 2000-01 season to the FCV Dender EH. In 2003, he moved to the Faroe Islands where he signed with B71 Sandoy before returning to Belgium to sign with K.A.A. Gent and playing with them the 2004-05 season. In 2006, he signed with another Faroese club, B68 Toftir, before moving to Cyprus where he represented AEK Larnaca and Doxa Katokopia. In the winter break of the 2007-08 season Greek club Veria FC signed him, but after a year he returned to Cyprus this time to play with Enosis Neon Paralimni FC. After 6 months without a club he signed with Macedonian club FK Teteks in January 2010 where he played the rest of the season.

Ndaw was member of the Gambian national team.

== External sources ==
- Mustapha Ndaw at National-Football-Teams.com
- Mustapha Ndaw at Soccerway (archived)
- Stats from Macedonia at Macedonianfootball.
