= Nemanja Čorović =

Serbian footballer

Personal information
- Full name: Nemanja Čorović
- Date of birth: 26 October 1975 (age 51)
- Place of birth: Zadar, SR Croatia, SFR Yugoslavia
- Height: 1.91 m (6 ft 3 in)
- Position: Striker

Senior career*
Years	Team	Apps	(Gls)
- Mogren
1997	Budućnost Podgorica	14	(2)
1997–2002	Čukarički	92	(24)
2002	Maribor	9	(0)
2003–2005	Pomorac	30	(21)
2005–2007	AEL Limassol	44	(22)
2007–2008	→ APOEL (loan)	14	(2)
2008–2009	AEL Limassol	2	(0)
2009–2010	Digenis Morphou	29	(14)
- * Club domestic league appearances and goals

Nemanja Čorović (Serbian Cyrillic: Немања Чоровић; born 26 October 1975) is a retired Serbian footballer.

== Career ==
Čorović started his career in Montenegrin clubs FK Mogren and FK Budućnost Podgorica, before moving to Belgrade to play with FK Čukarički. He later transferred to Slovenian NK Maribor, subsequently played for Croatian NK Pomorac, before moving to Cyprus, where he played for AEL FC and became the fan's favorite player. On summer of 2007 he was given on loan to APOEL where he won the Cypriot Cup. He finished his career in Digenis Morphou in the Cypriot Second Division after the 2009–10 season.
