= Robert Popov =

Macedonian footballer

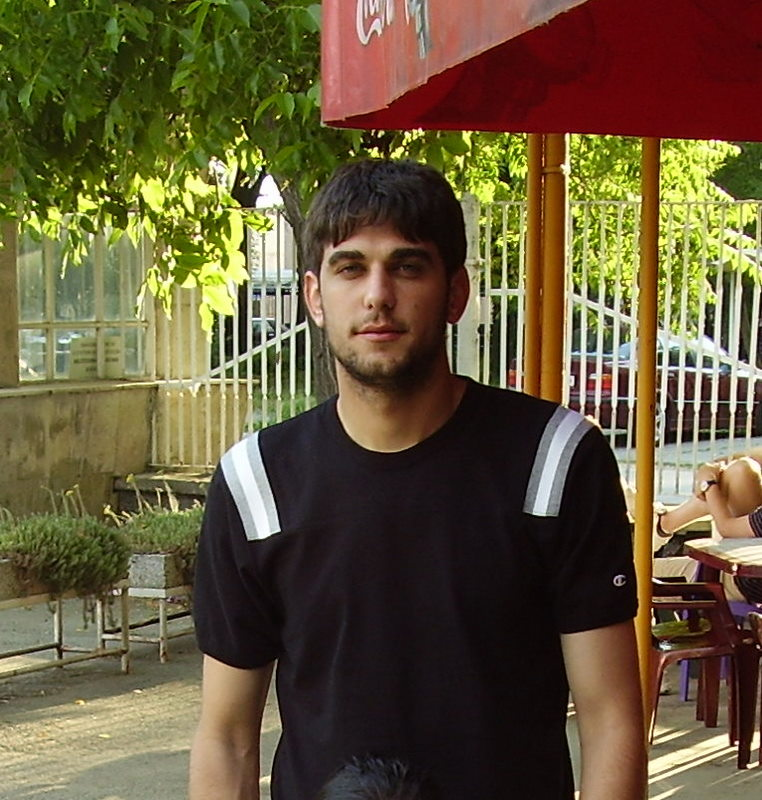

Personal information
- Date of birth: 16 April 1982 (age 44)
- Place of birth: Strumica, SR Macedonia
- Height: 1.85 m (6 ft 1 in)
- Position: Defender

Youth career
- 1993–2000: Belasica

Senior career*
Years	Team	Apps	(Gls)
2000–2003	Belasica	72	(7)
2003–2008	Litex Lovech	61	(2)
2008–2010	Auxerre	6	(0)
2008–2010	Auxerre B	28	(0)
2011–2012	Kriens	13	(1)
2012–2015	Wettswil-Bonstetten	31	(4)
2015–2016	FC Birmensdorf		

International career
2001–2009	Macedonia	17	(0)
- * Club domestic league appearances and goals as of 1 June 2014

Robert Popov (Macedonian: Роберт Попов; born 16 April 1982 in Strumica) is a retired footballer from North Macedonia.

== Club career ==
Robert is a right defender or defensive midfielder. He started his career with FK Belasica. In 2003 Popov signed with Litex Lovech for a fee of €200.000. In May 2004 he helped them win the Bulgarian Cup. In January 2008 Robert Popov signed with AJ Auxerre. Popov had a serious injury while at Auxerre but when he recovered, he did not play much so both Popov and the club mutually agreed to terminate his contract in the summer of 2010.

== International career ==
He made his senior debut for Macedonia in a July 2001 friendly match against Qatar and has earned a total of 17 caps, scoring no goals. His final international was a November 2009 friendly against Iran.

== Personal life ==
He is the older brother of former national team left back Goran Popov.
