= Nikos Nicolaou (footballer, born 1978) =

Cypriot footballer (born 1978)

Personal information
- Full name: Nikos Nicolaou
- Date of birth: June 28, 1978 (age 48)
- Place of birth: Cyprus
- Position: Central defender

Senior career*
| Years | Team | Apps | (Gls) |
| 2002–2005 | Nea Salamis Famagusta | | |
| 2005–2009 | Olympiakos Nicosia | | |
| 2009–2011 | Nea Salamis Famagusta | | |

Managerial career
- 2017–: Othellos
- * Club domestic league appearances and goals

Nikos Nicolaou (Greek: Νίκος Νικολάου, born 28 June 1978 in Cyprus), is a Cypriot football defender who last played for Nea Salamis Famagusta. He should not be confused with his namesake that played for Anorthosis Famagusta.
