= Federico Martorell =

Argentine footballer

Personal information
- Full name: Federico Martorell Rigo
- Date of birth: 16 March 1981 (age 45)
- Place of birth: Rosario, Argentina
- Height: 1.83 m (6 ft 0 in)
- Position: Centre-back

Senior career*
Years	Team	Apps	(Gls)
2002–2003	Newell's Old Boys	1	(0)
2004–2005	Atlético Tucumán	52	(6)
2005–2006	Platense	21	(1)
2006	Coronel Bolognesi	21	(3)
2007	Universidad de Chile	17	(0)
2008	O'Higgins	26	(1)
2008–2009	Thrasyvoulos	14	(3)
2009–2010	Levadiakos	14	(0)
2010–2011	Apollon Limassol	0	(0)
2010–2011	→ Ermis Aradippou (loan)	10	(0)
2012	Deportivo Táchira	20	(1)
2012–2013	Instituto	14	(1)
2013–2014	Sportivo Belgrano	16	(2)
2014	Santamarina	15	(0)
2015	Cobresal	11	(1)
2015–2016	San Luis	21	(1)
2016–2017	Cobresal	21	(0)
Total		294	(20)

Managerial career
- 2018–2019: Newell's Old Boys (youth)
- 2020: Audax Italiano (assistant)
- 2021: Unión La Calera (assistant)
- 2022–2024: Everton (assistant)
- 2024: Defensa y Justicia (assistant)
- 2025: O'Higgins (assistant)
- 2026: Universidad de Chile (assistant)
- * Club domestic league appearances and goals

Federico Martorell Rigo (born 16 March 1981) is an Argentine retired footballer who played as centre-back in Argentina.

== Club career ==
His professional debut came in 2002 with Newell's Old Boys in Santa Fe.

=== Greece ===
Martorell started his career in Greece playing for Thrasyvoulos. In Fyli Federico had 14 caps and scored 3 goal.

As a result of his good performance Levadeiakos offered a contract to Federico. In Livadia he had also 14 caps.

=== Cyprus ===
After 2 years in Super League Federico moved to Apollon Limassol on a free transfer. He made his debut on a 1–0 defeat against FC Sibir Novosibirsk for the UEFA Europa League. Later, he was given on loan to Ermis Aradippou. In May 2011, he was released from Apollon.

=== Venezuela ===
He signed a contract with Deportivo Táchira for the 2012 season.

== Coaching career ==
Martorell has served as assistant coach of Francisco Meneghini since 2020. In 2026, he follow him to Universidad de Chile.

== Honours ==
Cobresal

- Primera División de Chile (1): 2015 Clausura
