= Malzoni =

Brazilian footballer

Personal information
- Full name: Ricardo Malzoni Conceição
- Date of birth: 5 January 1984 (age 42)
- Place of birth: Curitiba, Brazil
- Height: 1.79 m (5 ft 10 1/2 in)
- Position: Forward

Youth career
- –2002: Coritiba

Senior career*
Years	Team	Apps	(Gls)
2003	Fluminense	0	(0)
2004–2005	Coritiba	0	(0)
2006	Joinville		
2006–2007	Barbate		
2008	Rio Branco		
2008	SERC Guarani		
2009	Atletico Trivento		
2009–2010	J. Malucelli		
2010–2011	Omonia Aradippou		(8)
2011–2012	Aris Limassol	3	(0)
Total		3	(0)

International career^{‡}
2001	Brazil U17	1	(1)
- * Club domestic league appearances and goals as of 22:16, 20 December 2018 (UTC) ‡ National team caps and goals as of 14:42, 20 July 2018 (UTC)

Ricardo Malzoni Conceição (born 5 January 1984), commonly known as Malzoni, is a retired Brazilian footballer who played as a forward.

== International career ==
Adryelson represented Brazil at the 2001 FIFA U-17 World Championship, scoring once against Trinidad and Tobago.

== Career statistics ==
=== Club ===
Club	Season	League			Cup		Other		Total	
Club	Season	Division	Apps	Goals	Apps	Goals	Apps	Goals	Apps	Goals
Aris Limassol	2011–12	Cypriot First Division	3	0	0	0	0	0	3	0
Career total			3	0	0	0	0	0	3	0
