= Artūrs Vaičulis =

Latvian footballer

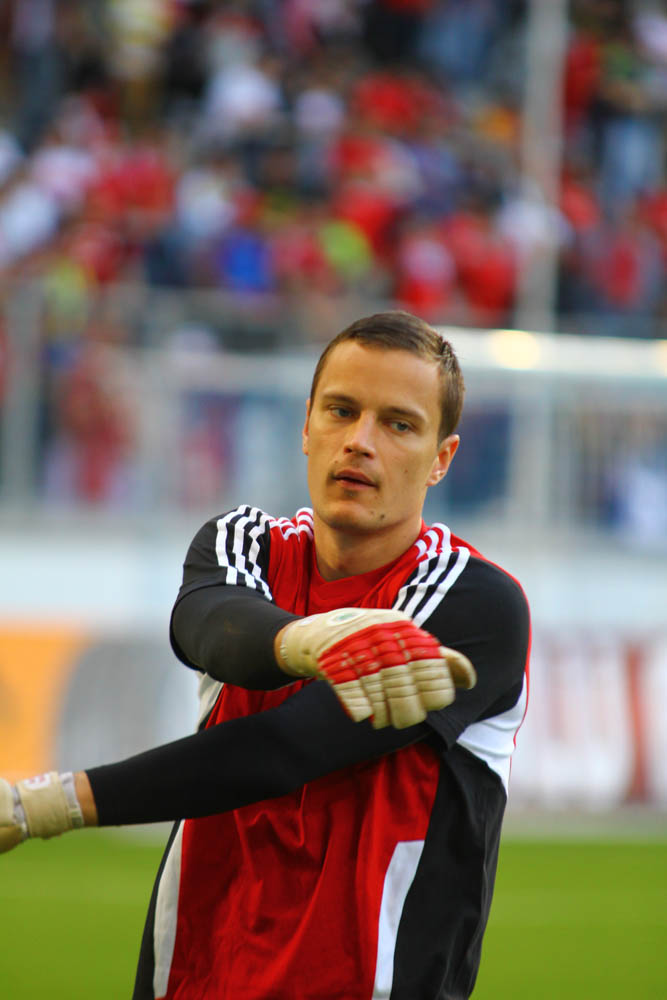
- Vaičulis in 2013

Personal information
- Date of birth: 26 February 1990 (age 36)
- Place of birth: Riga, Latvian SSR, Soviet Union (now Republic of Latvia)
- Height: 1.87 m (6 ft 2 in)
- Position: Goalkeeper

Youth career
- 2003–2005: FK Auda
- 2005–2006: Skonto
- 2006–2008: St Mirren
- 2008–2009: Rangers

Senior career*
Years	Team	Apps	(Gls)
2008–2009	Rangers	0	(0)
2009	→ Cowdenbeath (loan)	1	(0)
2009–2010	AEP Paphos	2	(0)
2010–2011	AEL Limassol	0	(0)
2011–2012	Atromitos Yeroskipou		(0)
2012–2013	Daugava Rīga	58	(0)
2014	Kruoja Pakruojis	6	(0)
2014–2016	FK Liepāja	15	(0)

International career
2007–2008	Latvia U17	6	(0)
2008–2009	Latvia U19	7	(0)
2009–2012	Latvia U21	12	(0)
- * Club domestic league appearances and goals

Artūrs Vaičulis (born 26 February 1990) is a Latvian former professional footballer who played s a goalkeeper.

== Club career ==
Artūrs Vaičulis was born in Riga and as a kid he started playing football at his local youth club FK Auda. Soon after he transferred to Skonto Rīga academy, making a remarkable progress. In his last season with Skonto Vaičulis also trained with the first team but did not make any first team appearances and as a youngster was neither assigned to the first team squad. In 2006 Vaičulis left Skonto, having received an offer from the Scottish Premier League club St Mirren academy to join the club. After several remarkable performances throughout the period of two years with St Mirren he accepted an offer to join the Scottish giants Rangers in January 2008. Vaičulis mostly played for the Glasgow club's youth team and was occasionally involved in the reserve team action. Due to the strong competition among goalkeepers he left Rangers in July 2009 to sign a one-year contract with the Cypriot First Division club AEP Paphos.

The following season Vaičulis served as the AEP back-up keeper and, eventually, made his debut for the club in a league match against Ermis Aradippou in April 2010. He appeared once more, playing his second match in the next row of the championship against Doxa Katokopia. At the end of the season Vaičulis left AEP Paphos and joined the fellow league club AEL Limassol in October 2010. At AEL he yet again served as the back-up keeper, not making a single league appearance throughout the year. In order to regain playing practice Vaičulis dropped a league lower, joining the Cypriot Second Division club Atromitos Yeroskipou in July 2011. His contract was terminated in November the same year by mutual consent due to the club's financial struggle.

Before the start of the 2012 season Vaičulis returned to his homeland Latvia, joining Daugava Rīga. Playing a substantial role throughout the season he helped the club retain a place in the top tier of Latvian football as well as reach the quarter-finals of the Latvian Cup. On account of additional inflow of funding in 2013, Daugava managed to strengthen their squad and finished the league in the top 4, with Vaičulis helping to achieve the club's best ever domestic result so far. His overall performance throughout the season was praised by the manager of Latvia national team Aleksandrs Starkovs and enabled him to receive his first senior international call-up in May 2013.

In March 2014 Vaičulis moved to the neighboring country Lithuania, signing a one-year deal with Kruoja Pakruojis. He left the club in July, having played six league matches, and returned to Latvia, joining the newly formed club FK Liepāja. Outrivaling the first keeper Raivo Varažinskis, he became a first eleven player in the second half of the season and helped the club finish the league in the 4th position, therefore, repeating the success formerly achieved together with Daugava Rīga.

== International career ==
Vaičulis is a former member of Latvia U-17, Latvia U-19 and Latvia U-21 football teams. He received his first ever senior international call-up for the friendly matches against Qatar and Turkey on 24 and 28 May 2013. During both matches Vaičulis was an unused substitute.
