= Maxime Larroque =

French footballer (born 1989)

Personal information
- Full name: Maxime Guy Alfred Larroque
- Place of birth: Toulouse, France
- Positions: Defender; midfielder

Senior career*
Years	Team	Apps	(Gls)
2007–2009	OFI	5	(0)
2008–2009	→ Anagennisi Arta (loan)		
2009–2011	AEL Limassol	11	(0)
2011–2012	Doxa Katokopias		
2013–2014	Colomiers	21	(0)
2014	Nikos & Sokratis Erimis		
- * Club domestic league appearances and goals

Maxime Guy Alfred Larroque (born 20 February 1989) is a French former professional footballer who played as a defender or midfielder.

== Career ==
At the age of 17, Larroque trained with Olympiacos, Greece's most successful club.

In 2008, he was sent on loan to Anagennisi Arta in the Greek lower leagues from Greek top flight side OFI.

In 2009, he signed for AEL Limassol in the Cypriot top flight.

In 2014, Larroque signed for Cypriot lower league team Nikos & Sokratis Erimis from Colomiers in the French third division.

In 2022, he arrived in Dubai and started his career in real estate.
