= Athos Chrysostomou =

Cypriot footballer (born 1981)

Personal information
- Full name: Chrysanthos Chrysostomou
- Date of birth: August 6, 1981 (age 45)
- Place of birth: Limassol, Cyprus
- Height: 1.82 m (6 ft 0 in)
- Position: Goalkeeper

Team information
- Current team: Girne Halk Evi
- Number: 1

Senior career*
Years	Team	Apps	(Gls)
1999–2005	AEL Limassol	67	(0)
2005–2006	Egaleo	0	(0)
2006–2009	Alki Larnaca	61	(0)
2009–2011	Ermis Aradippou	34	(0)
2011–2012	Ethnikos Achna	3	(0)
2012–2013	Ayia Napa	13	(0)
2013–2016	Ermis Aradippou	10	(0)
2016–2017	AEZ Zakakiou	8	(0)
2017–2018	Girne Halk Evi	32	(0)
2018–2019	Onisilos Sotira	3	(0)
2019–	Girne Halk Evi	18	(0)
- * Club domestic league appearances and goals as of 21:18, 8 February 2020 (UTC)

Athos Chrysostomou (born August 6, 1981) is a Cypriot football goalkeeper who plays for Girne Halk Evi of KTFF 1. Lig . His former teams were Egaleo, AEL Limassol, Alki Larnaca, Ethnikos Achna, Ayia Napa, Ermis Aradippou and AEZ Zakakiou.
