= Rubens Torres =

Brazilian footballer

Personal information
- Full name: Rubens Vieira Torres
- Date of birth: December 25, 1984 (age 41)
- Place of birth: Imperatriz, Brazil
- Height: 1.78 m (5 ft 10 in)
- Position: Midfielder

Senior career*
Years	Team	Apps	(Gls)
2004–2006	Vasco da Gama	28	(1)
2006	Madureira		
2006–2007	Vasco da Gama		
2007	15 de Novembro		
2007	→ Goiás (loan)	0	(0)
2007–2008	APOEL	5	(0)
2008	JV Lideral		
2009	America-RJ		
2010	Imperatriz		
2011	Sampaio Corrêa		
2012	Imperatriz		
- * Club domestic league appearances and goals

Rubens Vieira Torres (born in Imperatriz, Brazil) is a Brazilian footballer.

His former teams are: APOEL in Cyprus, Club de Regatas Vasco da Gama, Madureira Esporte Clube, Clube 15 de Novembro, Goiás Esporte Clube, America Football Club (RJ) and Sampaio Corrêa.

Rubens made 27 competitive appearances for CR Vasco da Gama.

Between 2015 and 2019, Rubens played for Imperatriz, a Brazilian club in the state of Maranhão, winning the title of Maranhão champion in 2015.

In 2021, Rubens agrees with Tocantinópolis, a Brazilian club from the state of Tocantins, to compete in the Brazilian championship series D.
