= Antonis Katsis =

Cypriot footballer (born 1989)

Personal information
- Full name: Antonis Katsis
- Date of birth: September 6, 1989 (age 37)
- Place of birth: Larnaca, Cyprus
- Height: 1.75 m (5 ft 9 in)
- Positions: Midfielder; right-back

Team information
- Current team: ASIL Lysi
- Number: 32

Youth career
- AEK Larnaca

Senior career*
Years	Team	Apps	(Gls)
2006–2009	AEK Larnaca	42	(0)
2009–2011	AC Omonia	2	(1)
2010–2011	→ Ermis Aradippou (loan)	3	(0)
2011–2013	Alki Larnaca	14	(0)
2012–2013	→ Ayia Napa(loan)	22	(0)
2013–2014	Ethnikos Achna	26	(0)
2014–2015	Nea Salamina	5	(0)
2015–2016	Ayia Napa	15	(0)
2016–2017	AEZ Zakakiou	16	(0)
2017–2019	Othellos Athienou	50	(3)
2019–2020	Omonia Aradippou	18	(0)
2020–2022	Othellos Athienou	58	(1)
2022	Achyronas-Onisilos	0	(0)
2022–2024	Ermis Aradippou	49	(1)
2024–2025	ASIL Lysi	22	(1)

International career
2009–2011	Cyprus U21	8	(0)
2011	Cyprus	1	(0)
- * Club domestic league appearances and goals as of 16:25, 21 May 2025 (UTC)

Antonis Katsis (born 6 September 1989, in Larnaca) is a Cypriot footballer who plays as central midfielder for ASIL Lysi in the Cypriot Second Division.

== Career ==
He has been elected through the Academies of AEK Larnaca. Since 2006 he was promoted to the first team of AEK Larnaca. For the 2009–2010, he transferred to AC Omonia where he celebrated his first title.

== International career ==
He played for the first time with the national team on the 11 November 2011 in a friendly match against Scotland where Cyprus lost 1–2.

== Honours ==
AC Omonia

- Cypriot Championship: 2010
