= Orthodoxos Ioannou =

Cypriot footballer (born 1986)

Personal information
- Full name: Orthodoxos Ioannou
- Date of birth: March 4, 1986 (age 40)
- Place of birth: Larnaca, Cyprus
- Height: 1.80 m (5 ft 11 in)
- Position: Defender

Youth career
- –2002: Nea Salamina

Senior career*
Years	Team	Apps	(Gls)
2003–2009	Nea Salamina	50	(1)
2003–2005	→Othellos Athienou (loan)	?	(?)
2005–2006	→Anagennisi Dherynia (loan)	?	(?)
2009–2011	AEK Larnaca F.C.	31	(1)
2011–2013	Ermis Aradippou	50	(1)
2013–2014	Othellos Athienou	10	(0)
2014–2015	Omonia Aradippou	6	(0)

International career^{‡}
2007–2009	Cyprus U21	9	(0)
- * Club domestic league appearances and goals as of 7 February 2015 ‡ National team caps and goals as of 2009

Orthodoxos Ioannou (Greek: Ορθόδοξος Ιωάννου; born 4 March 1986 in Larnaca, Cyprus) is a Cypriot football defender who last played for Omonia Aradippou.
