= Serjão (footballer, born 1979) =

Brazilian footballer

Personal information
- Full name: Sérgio Luis Gardino da Silva
- Date of birth: 9 December 1979 (age 46)
- Place of birth: Alvorada, Brazil
- Height: 1.85 m (6 ft 1 in)
- Position: Striker

Senior career*
Years	Team	Apps	(Gls)
2002	Pelotas		
2002	Grêmio	0	(0)
2003	Esportivo Bento Gonçalves		
2004	Novo Hamburgo		
2004	Defensor	0	(0)
2004–2006	Portimonense	48	(14)
2006–2007	Académica	8	(1)
2006–2007	→ Vizela (loan)	30	(6)
2007–2008	Vizela	27	(1)
2008–2009	Doxa	31	(24)
2009–2011	AEL Limassol	27	(3)
2010–2011	→ Alki Larnaca (loan)	24	(9)
2011–2012	Ermis	9	(2)
2012	Ethnikos Achna	16	(5)
2012–2013	AEP	16	(0)
2013–2014	União Frederiquense		
2014	Tupy		
2014	Inter Santa Maria		
2014	São Gabriel		
2014	Bagé		
2015	Prudentópolis	14	(4)
2015	Bagé		(11)
- * Club domestic league appearances and goals

Sérgio Luis Gardino da Silva (born 9 December 1979), commonly known as Serjão, is a Brazilian former footballer who played as a striker.

== Football career ==
Born in Alvorada, Rio Grande do Sul, Serjão only played lower league or amateur football in his country. In 2004, after a very brief spell in Uruguay, he moved to Portugal after signing with Portimonense SC in the second division, where his performances attracted the attention of Académica de Coimbra in the Primeira Liga, who acquired the player in the 2006 January transfer window.

Serjão scored his first and only goal in the top level of Portuguese football in just his second appearance, contributing to a 3–0 home win against F.C. Paços de Ferreira on 4 February 2006. However, shortly after, he returned to division two, going on to spend two seasons with F.C. Vizela.

For the 2008–09 campaign, Serjão signed with Doxa Katokopias F.C. in the Cypriot First Division. He scored a career-best 24 goals to help his team to the eighth position among 14 clubs, but netted only 19 times in the next four years combined, also playing in the country's top flight and representing AEL Limassol, Alki Larnaca FC, Ermis Aradippou, Ethnikos Achna FC and AEP Paphos FC.
