= Kyriakos Kyriakou =

Cypriot footballer (born 1989)

Personal information
- Full name: Kyriakos Kyriakou
- Date of birth: 20 June 1989 (age 37)
- Place of birth: Larnaca, Cyprus
- Height: 1.73 m (5 ft 8 in)
- Position: Left-back

Team information
- Current team: ASIL Lysi
- Number: 12

Youth career
- AEK Larnaca

Senior career*
Years	Team	Apps	(Gls)
2007–2011	AEK Larnaca	29	(0)
2011	→ Nea Salamina (loan)	2	(0)
2011–2012	APOP Kinyras	24	(0)
2012–2013	Omonia Aradippou	19	(1)
2013–2014	Anagennisi Deryneia	24	(1)
2014–2016	Nea Salamina	24	(0)
2016–2019	Othellos Athienou	53	(1)
2019–2020	Ermis Aradippou	8	(0)
2020–2023	Othellos Athienou		
2023–	ASIL Lysi	32	(0)

International career
2009	Cyprus U21	1	(0)
- * Club domestic league appearances and goals as of 21:36, 25 December 2024 (UTC)

Kyriakos Kyriakou (Greek: Κυριάκος Κυριάκου; born 20 June 1989 in Larnaca), is a Cypriot professional footballer who plays for ASIL Lysi in the Cypriot Second Division.

== Career ==
He began his career at AEK Larnaca, progressed through the youth academies, and in 2006 was promoted to the first team.
