= Evilásio (footballer) =

Brazilian footballer (born 1980)

Personal information
- Full name: Evilásio Leite da Costa
- Date of birth: March 18, 1980 (age 46)
- Place of birth: Brazil
- Height: 1.87 m (6 ft 2 in)
- Position: Striker

Senior career*
Years	Team	Apps	(Gls)
2002	Vasco da Gama AC		
2003	Nacional		
2005	Esportivo		
2005–2007	Porto Alegre Futebol Clube	?	(?)
2007	APOEL	0	(0)
2008–2009	Pelita Jaya		
2010	Esportivo		
2010	Futebol Clube Santa Cruz		
2010	Rio Branco Football Club		
2011–	Futebol Clube Santa Cruz		
- * Club domestic league appearances and goals

Evilasio Leite da Costa (born in Brazil), known as just Evilásio, is a Brazilian footballer, who is playing for Futebol Clube Santa Cruz.

== Club career ==
He briefly played for APOEL in Cyprus, coming from Porto Alegre Futebol Clube, in Brazil with his friend Marcos Tavares.

Evilásio has played in the Copa do Brasil for Vasco da Gama AC, Nacional and Esportivo.
