= Constantinos Georgiades =

Cypriot footballer

Personal information
- Full name: Constantinos Georgiades
- Date of birth: February 5, 1985 (age 41)
- Place of birth: Nicosia, Cyprus
- Height: 1.88 m (6 ft 2 in)
- Position: Striker

Youth career
- Digenis Akritas Morphou

Senior career*
Years	Team	Apps	(Gls)
2001–2005	Digenis Akritas Morphou	16	(0)
2006–2007	Apollon Limassol	2	(0)
2007–2008	Ethnikos Achnas	16	(2)
2008–2009	Digenis Akritas Morphou		
2009–2010	POL/AEM Maroniou		
2010–2011	Ermis Aradippou		
2011	Adonis Idaliou	5	(1)

International career^{‡}
2005–2006	Cyprus U21	8	(6)
2008–	Cyprus	1	(0)
- * Club domestic league appearances and goals as of Sep 1, 2008 ‡ National team caps and goals as of Sep 1, 2008

Constantinos Georgiades (Greek: Κωνσταντίνος Γεωργιάδης) (born 5 February 1985 in Nicosia) is a Cypriot former U21 national, footballer who last played for Adonis Idaliou in Cyprus as a striker. It is his second spell at the club after a three-year absence (2005–2008). His former teams are Apollon Limassol and Ethnikos Achnas.

== The beginning ==
Georgiades began his career in the youth teams of Digenis Morphou when he was 12 years old and by the age of 15 he had moved to the first team. Although he was a part of the squadron, he had to wait 2 years to play his first competitive match at the age of 17 in the final match of the 2001–2002 Cypriot Second Division championship.

Like many other Cypriot athletes, Georgiades' career suffered because of the Conscription in Cyprus. He managed, however, to continue to train with the hope of some day breaking into the first team. When he was released from the army in 2004, he remained a part of Digenis but did not feature regularly because of the manager's decision to play mostly experienced players in the squad. That year, he was on the bench when Digenis featured in the 2005 Cypriot Cup final and lost to AC Omonia Nicosia 2–0.

The 2005–2006 season started hopefully for Georgiades with the new manager, Savvas Constantinou, giving him a start in the first match of the season against Omonia. He impressed the fans with his technical ability but could not make an impact because of the superiority of the opponent. As the season progressed Georgiades did not play regularly but managed to score a memorable hat-trick for the U21 against Syria. A few weeks later he dislocated his shoulder, causing him to miss the rest of the season.

== Apollon Limassol ==
Frustrated at not getting a chance at Digenis, he left the club, He became a free-agent and pursued his luck elsewhere. After some trials with Apollon Limassol, the coach Bernd Stange signed him for the club. Unfortunately for him, he was not eligible to play until January 2007 and by that time Stange quit his post for personal reasons. Georgiades tried to break his way into the team but the imposing figure of Łukasz Sosin, the championship's top scorer for three consecutive seasons, was blocking him. At the end of the season Apollon hired Sinisa Gogic as the manager and without even seeing Georgiades play, he told him to find a new club. A new search began with the hope that this time he would find a club where he would play regularly.

== Ethnikos Achnas ==
The next path of his career was Ethnikos Achnas. At the beginning of the 2007–2008 season Georgiades featured in the first match against Nea Salamina where Achna lost 2–0. He did not feature again until the 7th day of the season against Anorthosis. He featured again for a cup match and at the next match with APOEL, scored his first goal in the Cypriot championship. On 2 December, Georgiades put an impressive performance once again this time against his old club Apollon opening the score with a powerful header and helped Ethnikos to win following 5 consecutive defeats.

On the 6th of February, one day after his 23rd birthday he gained his first cap for the men's national team in the home match against Ukraine. The match ended 1–1.

== Return to Digenis ==
On 27 August he signed a contract with boyhood club Digenis Akritas Morphou. He returns to the club after three years.

He was released by Digenis Akritas Morphou in April 2009. After spending one year helping POL/AEMaroniou advancing to the Cypriot Fourth Division he returns to Cypriot First Division, signing a contract with Ermis Aradippou in July 2010.
