= David (footballer, born 1977) =

Brazilian footballer

Personal information
- Full name: David Pereira da Costa
- Date of birth: March 15, 1977
- Place of birth: Olinda, Brazil
- Height: 1.80 m (5 ft 11 in)
- Position: Striker

Senior career*
Years	Team	Apps	(Gls)
1999	Íbis	11	(10)
1999	Unibol	20	(19)
1999–2000	Atlético Cucujães	30	(27)
2001–2002	Juventude Évora	33	(36)
2002–2003	Lusitano Évora	37	(40)
2003–2004	Portomosense	34	(30)
2004–2005	Torreense	35	(35)
2005–2006	Aves	20	(18)
2006	União Madeira	24	(22)
2006–2007	Atlético CP	18	(20)
2007–2008	Doxa	30	(30)
2008–2009	Apollon Limassol	20	(29)
2009–2010	Ethnikos Achna	20	(34)
2010–2011	Aris Limassol	22	(27)
2011–2012	APEP	33	(40)
- * Club domestic league appearances and goals

David Pereira da Costa (born 15 March 1977), simply known as David, is a former Brazilian footballer who played as a striker.

David's most memorable moment of his thirteen-year career was scoring the winner in a fourth round Taça de Portugal tie against Porto at the Estádio do Dragão whilst playing for Atlético CP.
