= Panayiotis Kythreotis =

Cypriot footballer (born 1980)

Personal information
- Full name: Panayiotis Kythreotis
- Date of birth: August 19, 1980 (age 46)
- Place of birth: Nicosia, Cyprus
- Position: Goalkeeper

Senior career*
Years	Team	Apps	(Gls)
2000–2006	AEK Larnaca		
2006–2007	APOEL	1	(0)
2007–2008	ASIL Lysi		
2008	Aris Limassol		
2009	Chalkanoras Idaliou		
2009–2011	AEK Larnaca	9	(0)
2010–2011	→ Omonia Aradippou (loan)	18	(0)
- * Club domestic league appearances and goals

Panayiotis Kythreotis (Greek: Παναγιώτης Κυθρεώτης; born 19 August 1980) is a former Cypriot football player, who played as a goalkeeper. He has also played for Aris Limassol, ASIL Lysi, APOEL and Chalkanoras Idaliou.

== Honours ==
AEK Larnaca

- Cypriot Cup: 2003–04
