= Marios Louka =

Cypriot footballer (born 1982)

Personal information
- Full name: Marios Louka
- Date of birth: December 9, 1982 (age 43)
- Place of birth: Larnaca, Cyprus
- Height: 1.82 m (6 ft 0 in)
- Position: Attacking midfielder

Senior career*
Years	Team	Apps	(Gls)
2002–2006	Nea Salamina	69	(15)
2006–2008	APOEL	32	(2)
2008–2009	AEL Limassol	19	(2)
2009	Ermis Aradippou	5	(2)
2010–2011	Nea Salamina	25	(2)
2011–2013	AEK Kouklia	49	(16)
2013–2014	Ayia Napa	23	(3)
2014–2016	Karmiotissa Polemidion	14	(2)

International career
2001–2003	Cyprus U21	7	(1)
- * Club domestic league appearances and goals as of 22:20, 28 May 2016 (UTC)

Marios Louka (Greek: Μάριος Λουκά; born December 9, 1982) is a Cypriot footballer playing for Karmiotissa Polemidion. He previously played for Ayia Napa F.C., Nea Salamina, Ermis Aradippou, AEL Limassol and APOEL.
