= Seyfo Soley =

Gambian footballer (born 1980)

Personal information
- Date of birth: 16 February 1980 (age 46)
- Place of birth: Lamin, Gambia
- Height: 1.88 m (6 ft 2 in)
- Position: Midfielder

Senior career*
Years	Team	Apps	(Gls)
1998–1999	Banjul Hawks	0	(0)
1999–2000	F.C. Nieuwkerken-Sint-Niklaas	24	(1)
2000–2002	K.S.C Lokeren SNW	49	(0)
2002–2003	Genk	41	(2)
2003–2004	Al-Hilal	0	(0)
2004–2006	Genk	43	(2)
2006–2007	Preston North End	6	(0)
2011	Doxa Katokopia	7	(0)
- Alki Larnaca

International career
2000–2007	Gambia	10	(1)
- * Club domestic league appearances and goals

Seyfo Soley (born 16 February 1980) is a Gambian former professional footballer who played as a midfielder. He captained the Gambia national team. He is the former husband of the First Lady of Sierra Leone, Fatima Bio.

== Career ==
Soley was born in Lamin, the Gambia. He played for Banjul Hawks FC, K.S.C. Lokeren Oost-Vlaanderen, Al-Hilal and K.R.C. Genk, prior to signing for Preston North End in January 2007.

Soley made his debut for Preston North End in the 2007 fifth round of the FA Cup which Preston lost 3–1 to Manchester City. In June 2007 Preston that he had left the club after rejecting the club's offer of a new contract.

On 26 July 2008, Soley played as a trialist for Motherwell in the second half of their 4–0 friendly win over Bradford City.

Soley trialled with Norwich City in the 2008–09 season under Glenn Roeder but was not offered a permanent deal. Though he was out of contract for three years, the 30-year-old midfielder made plans to move to the Cyprus premier-tier side Apollon Limassol in 2010, and the deal took effect in January 2011, after Apollon Limassol exhausted their 17-foreign-player limit.
