= Famagusta derby =

Football matches played in Cyprus

- Other names: Varoshi derby Anorthosis–Nea Salamina derby
- Locale: Famagusta; Larnaca (temporarily)
- Teams: Anorthosis Famagusta; Nea Salamis Famagusta
- Competitions: Cypriot First Division, Cypriot Cup
- First game: Anorthosis 3–1 Nea Salamis (28 September 1953) (friendly)
- First official game: Anorthosis 2–3 Nea Salamis (20 November 1955)
- Last game: Anorthosis 2-0 Nea Salamis (16 January 2021)
- Next game
- Meetings total: 126
- Most wins: Anorthosis (69)
- Most goals: Anorthosis (210)
- Largest victory: Anorthosis 7-1 Nea Salamis (1 February 1998)

The Famagusta derby (Greek: Ντέρμπι Αμμοχώστου) refers to the Famagusta's local derby, football matches played between Anorthosis Famagusta and Nea Salamis Famagusta. It is one of the rivalries of Cypriot football. The rivalry is also indicative of social, cultural and political differences.

Until 1974 the games between the two teams were taking place in Famagusta. After the Turkish invasion of Cyprus and the occupation of Famagusta by the Turkish army, the games between the two teams are taking place in Larnaca, where the two teams have their headquarters.

In recent decades the political differences, the local conflicts and the social divide were some of the elements of the rivalry between the two teams; however, due to the uprooting of the two teams, now their games are a tribute and remembrance of their occupied city.

The matches between the two teams are also called the Varoshi derby (Greek: Βαρωσιώτικο ντέρμπι) because of Varosha, the name of an area in the modern city of Famagusta.

== Background ==
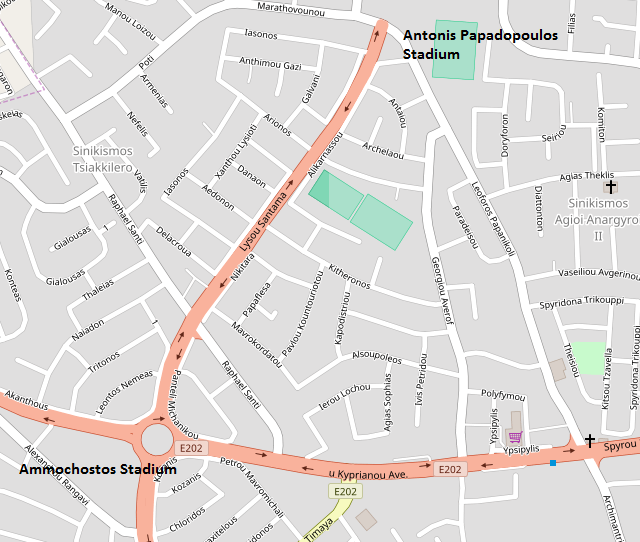
Map of Larnaca which indicates the positions of Nea Salamina's and Anorthosis' stadiums

Anorthosis and Nea Salamis are the most important and historical teams of Famagusta. Anorthosis was founded in 1911 and Nea Salamina in 1948.

=== Anorthosis' foundation and early years ===
The club Anorthosis Famagusta was founded on 30 January 1911. The early years did not develop sporting action but mainly national, spiritual, cultural and social. In 1929 the club began to develop sporting action. However, the young members of the club were active at football much earlier. Since the early 1920s, they formed a group called the "Greek Football Team of Varosha" (Greek: Ποδοσφαιρική Ομάδα Ελλήνων Βαρωσίων). In 1929, that team officially joined Anorthosis and the players, who were all members of Anorthosis, became the first football team of the club. After that, Anorthosis took part in the first unofficial national leagues, the Cities' Championships (πρωταθλήματα πόλεων). The Cyprus Football Association (CFA) was founded in 1934, with Anorthosis being one of the founding members.

In 1947, Anorthosis along with EPA Larnaca and Pezoporikos Larnaca called for statutory change, which sought primarily for the presidency of CFA to rotate through all cities. These teams that have raised this request asking for equal treatment once thought that the clubs of Nicosia (where the CFA resided), especially APOEL, were enjoying the favor of the CFA. The request was discussed at a general meeting of the Federation on 27 August 1947, but only these three teams voted in favor of this proposal. After this result, the three teams left the CFA and created their own federation, the Football Sports Federation of Cyprus (Ποδοσφαιρική Αθλητική Ομοσπονδία Κύπρου, ΠΑΟΚ), established in Larnaca. Later on, five more clubs joined the new federation. A climate of conflict prevailed between the two federations. The conflict ended over a year later, when the Football Sports Federation of Cyprus dissolved, and the three unions (Anorthosis, EPA, Pezoporikos) reintegrated into the CFA in the autumn of 1948. This followed the establishment of leftist unions, including Nea Salamina.

=== Nea Salamis' foundation and early years ===
When Nea Salamis Famagusta was founded, Greece was entering a period of civil war between leftists and rightists. The situation in Greece affected Cyprus, both politically and socially; most athletes were also involved in politics. At this time, Famagusta had two sports clubs: Evagoras Gymnastic Association, or GSE (Greek: Γυμναστικός Σύλλογος Ευαγόρας) and Anorthosis Famagusta. The GSE had many talented leftist athletes on its rosters. At Anorthosis, many players were also leftists. Under the influence of the contemporary right-wing political climate, the GSE and Anorthosis began to restrict leftist athletes. In early 1947, a group of people from Famagusta (including leftists, members and non-members of GSE and Anorthosis) concluded that there was a space for another sports club in the city. Due to the existing restrictions, they envisioned a club which would appeal to everyone in Famagusta regardless of political affiliation.

On 14 February 1948, the decision was made to establish the club, and on 7 March 1948 the Nea Salamina sports club was formed as the first leftist athletic club in Cyprus. Negative attitudes towards the left-wing athletes prevailed in other Cypriot cities and some other clubs also were formed.

Due to their left-wing political beliefs, members of the new clubs were not accepted into the Cyprus Football Association (CFA) and they established a new football federation (the Cyprus Amateur Football Federation, or CAFF) in December 1948. The new federation organized leagues and cups, which attracted thousands of fans. The CAFF matches became more popular than those of the CFA.

CAFF members favored the unification of football in Cyprus. They tried for three years to persuade the CFA to accept them as members, without any success. The existence of two football federations (with two separate championships) in a country such as Cyprus was unprecedented. The situation created economic hardship, and hampered the development and the improvement of Cypriot football. The clubs felt that sports should reflect fraternity and friendship rather than discrimination. In December 1952, the first issue of the sports newspaper Athlitiki supported the unification of Cypriot football. Foreign coaches of the CFA clubs also supported unification, leading CFA to respond that "their statements opposed the spirit of the Federation". Coaches of CFA's teams were initially hostile towards consolidation supporters. In summer 1953, the majority of Cypriot sportspeople expressed support for football unification. In August of that year Nea Salamina, Omonia, Alki Larnaca and Antaeus Limassol submitted a joint application to the CFA to join the Cypriot First Division. On 19 September, the CFA accepted Nea Salamina, Omonia and Antaeus for membership. However, the organization's negative attitude towards those clubs continued. First, the league rejected applications from Alki, Orfeas Nicosia and Neos Asteras (although the first two joined a year later), and second, arguing that according to its constitution, only one team may participate in the Cypriot First Division and two teams in the second division. The CAFF clubs accepted these conditions in the interest of unification. In an ad hoc meeting of CAFF, members agreed that Omonia would join the first division and Nea Salamina and Antaeus the second division. Following these decisions, CAFF disbanded.

=== First match (friendly) ===
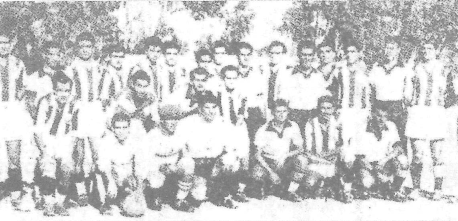
The first match after the unification of Cypriot football between Nea Salamina and Anorthosis at GSE Stadium, Famagusta, in 1953

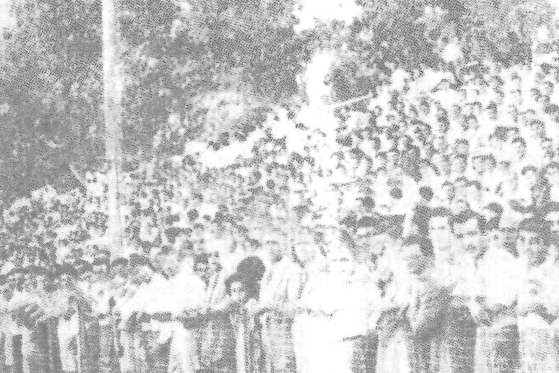
The fans at the first game after the unification of Cypriot football between Nea Salamina and Anorthosis at GSE Stadium, Famagusta, in 1953

The first match between teams from the two federations (a friendly game) was played by Nea Salamina and Anorthosis at GSE Stadium on 27 September 1953. The stadium was packed with 5,200 fans of the two Famagustian clubs. The final result was 3–1 in favor of Anorthosis, and the match was described by Athlitiki as an evidence of superior sportsmanship and brotherhood of fans.

The historical for Cypriot football match meant that the unification of Cyprus football was now a reality. It was the first match between a right-wing and a left-wing club in Cyprus. The match was scheduled to start at 3:25 pm. The stands of the stadium were overwhelmed with people and at 2:15 pm were already full. The stadium was filled with 5,200 fans of both teams. The entrance was set at one shilling. Total earnings had amounted to 260 pounds, a significant amount in that era. Anorthosis won 3–1 with goals from Panos Siailo (49' and 70') and Loizo Chatziloizou (64'). Nea Salamina had temporarily equalized with Antonis Vrachimis "Tzioumpis".

Players:

Anorthosis lineup: Costas Hadjigeorgiou "Kotsios", Moses Mantzalos, Xanthos Sarris (46' Phaedrus Farmakalidis), Eugene Zervidis "Voskaris" (46' George Procopius "Prokopis"), Pambos Charalambous, Aristos Raphael (captain ), Loizos Hadjiloizou, Costakis Antoniades (Marios Papadopolos "China"), Costakis Xanthoullis, Panos Siailos, Antonis Papadopoulos

Nea Salamina lineup: Michael Sophocles "Blakkis", Takis Kkafas, Andreas Elias "Andrellis" (captain), Antrikkis, Andreas Paschalis "Fokkis", Paraschos Georgios (Andreas Papathomas), Mustafa Nitae, Vassos Kostanta (Andreas Spyrou), George Avetisian "Tziortzis", Anthony Vrachimis "Tzioumpis", Sotiris Photios "Tirimo"

Anorthosis played with striped jerseys of white and blue colors and white shorts, while Nea Salamina played with white shirts and red shorts. Referee of the meeting was the Englishman Dickinson.

=== First official match ===
The first official match between the two teams took place on 20 November 1955, for the 1955–56 Cypriot First Division (After the unification of Cypriot football, Nea Salamina joined the Cypriot Second division, so the first official match between the two teams was played in 1955 when they were promoted to the Cypriot first division). The match was part of the first round of the championship in their common headquarters in GSE Stadium. Typically, the home team was Anorthosis. Nea Salamina won 3–2. This victory was the first for Nea Salamina against Anorthosis, but also their first in the Cypriot First Division.

Teams:

Anorthosis lineup: –

Nea Salamina lineup: Michael Sophocles "Blakkis", Kalafatis Fokkis, Takis Kkafas, Vasoudi, Andreas Elias "Andrellis", Anthony Vrachimis "Tzioumpis", George Avetisian "Tziortzis", Kostakis, Sotiris Photiou "Tirimo", Mitsios Deryneiotis

=== Host stadiums ===
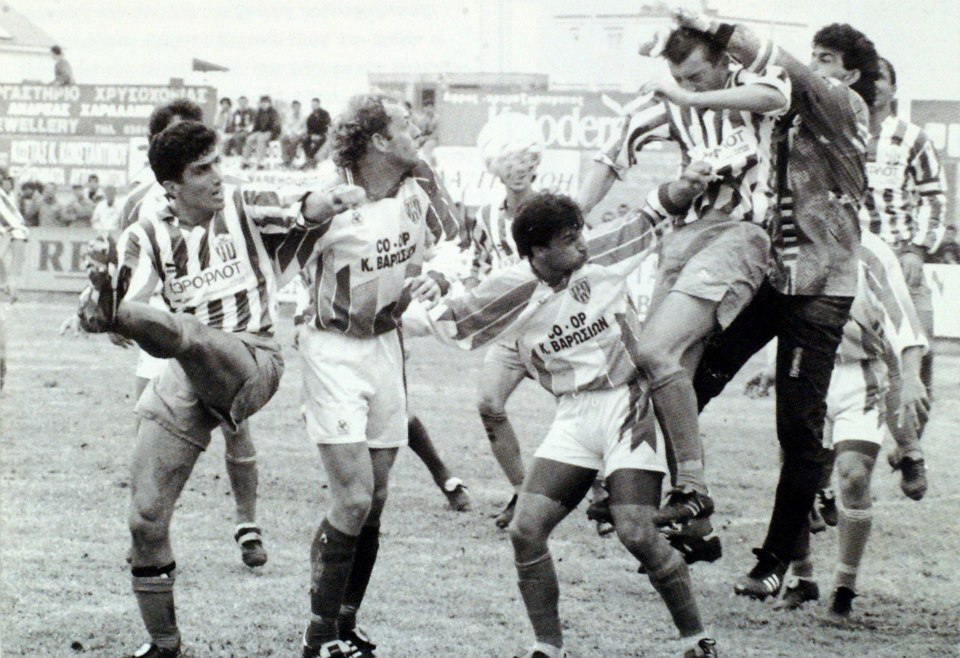
Famagusta derby in the 1994–95 season

Anorthosis were using the GSE Stadium as their home until 1974. Nea Salamina used that stadium from 1953 (until 1974), after the unification of Cypriot football (GSE authorities did not allow use of GSE Stadium during the period 1948–1953). Therefore, the games between the two teams from 1953 to 1974 were played at GSE Stadium. The last match between the two teams in GSE Stadium was on 7 April 1974, in the 1973–74 Cypriot First Division. Anorthosis won 1–0.

After the Turkish invasion of Cyprus and the occupation of Famagusta by the Turkish troops, the two teams were using football stadiums in other cities and regions of Cyprus. Therefore, the matches between the two teams were played at various stadiums.

The first match between the two teams after the occupation of Famagusta was held on 16 February 1975 in the 1974–75 Cypriot First Division. The home team was Anorthosis. The game was played at the Paralimni Municipal Stadium, the temporary home ground of Anorthosis. Nea Salamina won 1–0.

In 1986, the construction of Antonis Papadopoulos Stadium was completed and since then is the home stadium of Anorthosis. The same stadium was also the home stadium of Nea Salamina from 1987 until 1991. In 1991, the construction of Ammochostos Stadium was completed, and the stadium is used as the home of Nea Salamina to this day. The only exception was the 2004–05 Cypriot First Division when Nea Salamina used Antonis Papadopoulos Stadium as their home due to the need of improvement of Ammochostos Stadium, in order to be able to host Cypriot First Division matches. Thus, during this period the matches between the two teams were both played at Antonis Papadopoulos Stadium.

== Records and statistics ==
=== Overall statistics ===
The table below presents the history of all matches between Anorthosis and Nea Salamina for the official competitions (Cypriot First Division, Cypriot Cup).

Competition	Games	Anorthosis won	Drawn	Nea Salamis won	Anorthosis GF	Nea Salamis GF
Cypriot First Division	115	62	32	21	199	116
Cypriot Cup	9	5	3	1	10	5
Total	124	67	35	22	209	121

With Anorthosis as home team The table below presents the history of all matches with Anorthosis as home team (from 1953 to 1974 and from 1987 to 1991 the two teams used the same stadium as home ground).

Competition	Games	Anorthosis won	Drawn	Nea Salamis won	Anorthosis GF	Nea Salamis GF
Cypriot First Division	57	35	14	8	109	58
Cypriot Cup	5	3	1	1	5	3
Total	62	38	15	9	114	61

With Nea Salamis as home team The table below presents the history of all matches with Nea Salamis as home team (from 1953 to 1974 and from 1987 to 1991 the two teams used the same stadium as home ground).

Competition	Games	Anorthosis won	Drawn	Nea Salamis won	Anorthosis GF	Nea Salamis GF
Cypriot First Division	58	27	18	13	90	58
Cypriot Cup	4	2	2	0	5	2
Total	62	29	20	13	95	60

=== Results per competition ===
The two teams played against each other in two competitions: Cypriot First Division and Cypriot Cup.

==== Cypriot First Division ====
In the Cypriot First Division, the two teams competed in 56 official seasons. Furthermore, they also competed in the 1963–64 Cypriot First Division, which was abandoned. The two teams only played one match against each other that season that counted as official.

The two teams faced each other two times in each season. Exceptions were: a) In the 1994–95 Cypriot First Division, three games were played because the league consisted of three rounds (two games with Anorthosis as home team and one game with Nea Salamina as home team), b) In the 2015–16 Cypriot First Division, four games were played because for the first time, the two teams took part in the same group for the second phase of the league.

In the 1979–80, 2001–02, 2003–04, 2008–09 and 2010–11 seasons, the Famagusta derby was not held because Nea Salamina took part in the Cypriot Second Division.

The table below shows all the results of the two teams in the Cypriot First Division.

Season	Round	Date	Home team	Stadium	Result
1955-56	1st round	20-11-1955	Nea Salamis	GSE Stadium	3 – 2
1955-56	9th round	24-03-1956	Anorthosis	Famagusta Municipal Stadium	0 – 0
1956-57	3rd round	09-12-1956	Anorthosis	GSE Stadium	3 – 1
1956-57	6th round	27-01-1957	Nea Salamis	GSE Stadium	0 – 1
1957-58	9th round	19-01-1958	Anorthosis	GSE Stadium	2 – 0
1957-58	17th round	11-05-1958	Nea Salamis	GSE Stadium	1 – 3
1959-60	2nd round	18-10-1959	Anorthosis	GSE Stadium	3 – 1
1959-60	13th round	21-02-1960	Nea Salamis	GSE Stadium	1 – 2
1960-61	1st round	16-10-1960	Anorthosis	GSE Stadium	2 – 1
1960-61	19th round	14-05-1961	Nea Salamis	GSE Stadium	1 – 2
1961-62	19th round	30-05-1962	Anorthosis	GSE Stadium	3 – 1
1961-62	10th round	18-03-1962	Nea Salamis	GSE Stadium	3 – 1
1962-63	3rd round	04-11-1962	Nea Salamis	GSE Stadium	1 – 5
1962-63	22nd round	28-04-1963	Anorthosis	GSE Stadium	4 – 1
1963-64	4th round	10-11-1963	Nea Salamis	GSE Stadium	2 – 0
1964-65	2nd round	22-11-1964	Anorthosis	GSE Stadium	0 – 0
1964-65	19th round	19-05-1965	Nea Salamis	GSE Stadium	1 – 1
1965-66	6th round	19-12-1965	Nea Salamis	GSE Stadium	2 – 3
1965-66	19th round	15-05-1966	Ανόρθωση	GSE Stadium	1 – 4
1966-67	4th round	20-11-1966	Nea Salamis	GSE Stadium	2 – 0
1966-67	20th round	09-04-1967	Anorthosis	GSE Stadium	1 – 2
1967-68	11th round	28-01-1968	Nea Salamis	GSE Stadium	0 – 3
1967-68	16th round	03-03-1968	Anorthosis	GSE Stadium	6 – 5
1968-69	3rd round	27-10-1968	Nea Salamis	GSE Stadium	1 – 0
1968-69	16th round	23-02-1969	Anorthosis	GSE Stadium	2 – 0
1969-70	8th round	23-11-1969	Anorthosis	GSE Stadium	0 – 0
1969-70	16th round	28-01-1970	Nea Salamis	GSE Stadium	0 – 0
1970-71	11th round	27-12-1970	Anorthosis	GSE Stadium	1 – 3
1970-71	21st round	31-03-1971	Nea Salamis	GSE Stadium	1 – 1
1971-72	8th round	05-12-1971	Nea Salamis	GSE Stadium	3 – 3
1971-72	19th round	27-02-1972	Anorthosis	GSE Stadium	1 – 2
1972-73	9th round	10-12-1972	Anorthosis	GSE Stadium	1 – 0
1972-73	23rd round	01-04-1973	Nea Salamis	GSE Stadium	1 – 0
1973-74	10th round	16-12-1973	Nea Salamis	GSE Stadium	0 – 0
1973-74	23rd round	07-04-1974	Anorthosis	GSE Stadium	1 – 0
1974-75	12th round	16-02-1975	Anorthosis	Paralimni Municipal Stadium	0 – 1
1974-75	26th round	25-05-1975	Nea Salamis	GSZ Stadium (1928)	1 – 1
1975-76	12th round	28-12-1975	Nea Salamis	Anagennisi Football Ground	0 – 0
1975-76	25th round	04-04-1976	Anorthosis	GSZ Stadium (1928)	4 – 2
1976-77	1st round	02-10-1976	Anorthosis	Aradippou Municipal Stadium	0 – 0
1976-77	30th round	08-05-1977	Nea Salamis	GSZ Stadium (1928)	1 – 1
1977-78	7th round	26-11-1977	Anorthosis	GSZ Stadium (1928)	1 – 1
1977-78	21st round	05-03-1978	Nea Salamis	Dasaki Stadium	1 – 1
1978-79	9th round	03-12-1978	Anorthosis	Dasaki Stadium	3 – 4
1978-79	23rd round	17-03-1979	Nea Salamis	GSZ Stadium (1928)	2 – 0
1980-81	10th round	04-01-1981	Nea Salamis	GSZ Stadium (1928)	2 – 1
1980-81	22nd round	05-04-1981	Anorthosis	Dasaki Stadium	3 – 1
1981-82	11th round	27-12-1981	Nea Salamis	Dasaki Stadium	1 – 1
1981-82	23rd round	27-03-1982	Anorthosis	GSZ Stadium (1928)	0 – 4
1982-83	11th round	19-12-1982	Anorthosis	Dasaki Stadium	3 – 2
1982-83	23rd round	02-04-1983	Nea Salamis	GSZ Stadium	1 – 3
1983-84	2nd round	09-10-1983	Anorthosis	Dasaki Stadium	1 – 1
1983-84	14th round	21-01-1984	Nea Salamis	GSZ Stadium	0 – 0
1984-85	13th round	23-01-1985	Nea Salamis	GSZ Stadium	0 – 0
1984-85	25th round	18-05-1985	Anorthosis	Tsirio Stadium	1 – 0
1985-86	12th round	04-01-1986	Anorthosis	Tsirio Stadium	1 – 0
1985-86	24th round	29-03-1986	Nea Salamis	GSZ Stadium	1 – 0
1986-87	3rd round	18-10-1986	Nea Salamis	GSZ Stadium	1 – 1
1986-87	17th round	22-02-1987	Anorthosis	An. Papadopoulos	0 – 0
1987-88	2nd round	11-10-1987	Anorthosis	An. Papadopoulos	1 – 0
1987-88	16th round	16-03-1988	Nea Salamis	An. Papadopoulos	2 – 2
1988-89	11th round	18-12-1988	Nea Salamis	An. Papadopoulos	0 – 1
1988-89	25th round	25-03-1989	Anorthosis	An. Papadopoulos	0 – 2
1989-90	1st round	01-10-1989	Nea Salamis	An. Papadopoulos	0 – 1
1989-90	26th round	19-05-1990	Anorthosis	An. Papadopoulos	2 – 0
1990-91	3rd round	14-10-1990	Nea Salamis	An. Papadopoulos	0 – 1
1990-91	15th round	27-01-1991	Anorthosis	An. Papadopoulos	0 – 0
1991-92	11th round	29-12-1991	Nea Salamis	Ammochostos	1 – 3
1991-92	23rd round	04-04-1992	Anorthosis	An. Papadopoulos	2 – 1
1992-93	10th round	13-12-1992	Nea Salamis	Ammochostos	1 – 2
1992-93	23rd round	02-05-1993	Anorthosis	An. Papadopoulos	1 – 1
1993-94	13th round	16-01-1994	Nea Salamis	Ammochostos	0 – 0
1993-94	25th round	23-04-1994	Anorthosis	An. Papadopoulos	3 – 0
1994-95	5th round	24-09-1994	Anorthosis	An. Papadopoulos	3 – 1
1994-95	15th round	10-12-1994	Nea Salamis	Ammochostos	3 – 0
1994-95	24th round	04-03-1995	Anorthosis	An. Papadopoulos	3 – 1
1995-96	3rd round	14-10-1995	Nea Salamis	Ammochostos	0 – 1
1995-96	15th round	10-02-1996	Anorthosis	An. Papadopoulos	3 – 2
1996-97	12th round	21-12-1996	Anorthosis	An. Papadopoulos	2 – 0
1996-97	24th round	20-04-1997	Nea Salamis	Ammochostos	1 – 1
1997-98	3rd round	05-10-1997	Nea Salamis	Ammochostos	0 – 3
1997-98	15th round	01-02-1998	Anorthosis	An. Papadopoulos	7 – 1
1998-99	13th round	20-12-1998	Anorthosis	An. Papadopoulos	5 – 3
1998-99	25th round	24-04-1999	Nea Salamis	Ammochostos	2 – 3
1999-00	3rd round	03-10-1999	Anorthosis	An. Papadopoulos	1 – 0
1999-00	15th round	23-01-2000	Nea Salamis	Ammochostos	1 – 4
2000-01	3rd round	30-09-2000	Anorthosis	An. Papadopoulos	2 – 1
2000-01	15th round	20-01-2001	Nea Salamis	Ammochostos	1 – 1
2002-03	3rd round	14-09-2002	Anorthosis	Paralimni Stadium	0 – 0
2002-03	15th round	05-01-2003	Nea Salamis	Ammochostos	0 – 2
2004-05	12th round	18-12-2004	Anorthosis	An. Papadopoulos	4 – 2
2004-05	25th round	08-05-2005	Nea Salamis	An. Papadopoulos	0 – 2
2005-06	1st round	29-08-2005	Nea Salamis	Ammochostos	2 – 5
2005-06	14th round	08-01-2006	Anorthosis	An. Papadopoulos	2 – 0
2006-07	11th round	19-11-2006	Nea Salamis	Ammochostos	1 – 0
2006-07	24th round	21-04-2007	Anorthosis	An. Papadopoulos	4 – 1
2007-08	12th round	09-12-2007	Nea Salamis	Ammochostos	0 – 4
2007-08	25th round	15-03-2008	Anorthosis	An. Papadopoulos	5 – 0
2009-10	3rd round	20-09-2009	Nea Salamis	Ammochostos	1 – 2
2009-10	16th round	11-01-2010	Anorthosis	An. Papadopoulos	4 – 1
2011-12	2nd round	11-09-2011	Anorthosis	An. Papadopoulos	1 – 1
2011-12	15th round	07-01-2012	Nea Salamis	Ammochostos	0 – 3
2012-13	8th round	04-11-2012	Anorthosis	An. Papadopoulos	1 – 0
2012-13	21st round	10-02-2013	Nea Salamis	Ammochostos	2 – 1
2013-14	11th round	30-11-2013	Nea Salamis	Ammochostos	0 – 3
2013-14	24th round	09-03-2014	Anorthosis	An. Papadopoulos	1 – 1
2014-15	8th round	03-11-2014	Nea Salamis	Ammochostos	2 – 3
2014-15	19th round	08-02-2015	Anorthosis	An. Papadopoulos	1 – 0
2015-16	2nd round	29-08-2015	Nea Salamis	Ammochostos	1 – 3
2015-16	15th round	20-12-2015	Anorthosis	An. Papadopoulos	2 – 1
2015-16	30th round	02-04-2016	Nea Salamis	Ammochostos	0 – 1
2015-16	35th round	07-05-2016	Anorthosis	An. Papadopoulos	1 – 1
2016-17	2nd round	27-08-2016	Anorthosis	An. Papadopoulos	0 – 0
2016-17	15th round	16-12-2016	Nea Salamis	Ammochostos	2 – 1
2017-18	1st round	20-08-2017	Nea Salamis	Ammochostos	1 – 1
2017-18	14th round		Anorthosis	An. Papadopoulos	

==== Cypriot Cup ====
For the Cypriot Cup, the two teams faced each other four times in knockout games (three times in the quarter-finals and one time in the semi-finals) and one time in the group stage. Anorthosis qualified three times and Nea Salamina one time. In the 2003–04 Cypriot Cup, the two teams participated in the same group of four teams (round of 16). Anorthosis took 2nd place and qualified for the next round, while Nea Salamina took third place and was eliminated.

Season	Round	Date	Home team	Stadium	Results	Qualified
1963-64	Quarterfinals	14-06-1964	Anorthosis	GSE Stadium	1 – 0	Anorthosis
1963-64	Quarterfinals	24-06-1964	Nea Salamina	GSE Stadium	1 – 2	Anorthosis
1965-66	Semifinals	19-06-1966	Nea Salamina	GSE Stadium	1 – 0	Nea Salamina
1969-70	Quarterfinals	11-04-1970	Anorthosis	GSE Stadium	3 – 1	Anorthosis
1969-70	Quarterfinals	15-04-1970	Nea Salamina	GSE Stadium	1 – 1	Anorthosis
1970-71	Quarterfinals	16-05-1971	Anorthosis	GSE Stadium	2 – 1	Anorthosis
1970-71	Quarterfinals	19-05-1971	Nea Salamina	GSE Stadium	0 – 0	Anorthosis
2003-04	Group	24.01.2004	Nea Salamina	Ammochostos	0 – 0	Anorthosis
2003-04	Group	03.02.2004	Anorthosis	An. Papadopoulos	1 – 0	Anorthosis

=== Head-to-head ranking in the Cypriot First Division ===
The table below shows the positions the two teams finished per period in the Cypriot First Division.

P.	56	57	58	60	61	62	63	65	66	67	68	69	70	71	72	73	74	75	76	77	78	79	81	82	83	84	85	86	87	88	89	90	91	92	93	94	95	96	97	98	99	00	01	03	05	06	07	08	10	12	13	14	15	16	17
1		1	1	1		1	1																														1		1	1	1	1			1			1							
2					2																				2								2	2		2		2						2							2				
3	3								3	3																	3								3		3										3		3						
4							4		4						4	4												4			4											4	4			4				4					
5	5	5				5		5		5	5		5						5		5	5	5			5		5						5	5																		5	5	
6				6									6					6						6							6		6												6	6						6		6	6
7			7					7				7					7			7			7							7		7																		7		7			7
8					8						8			8	8														8	8								8	8	8															
9												9												9												9																	9		
10														10					10		10						10					10									10						10								
11																		11								11																									11				
12																									12																		12	12											
13																13	13			13									13																			13	13						
14																																																							
15																						15																																	
16																																																							

Key:
Anorthosis
Nea Salamina

• Total: Anorthosis was higher 49 times, Nea Salamina was higher 6 times.

=== Statistic per stadium ===
The tables below present the history of all matches between Anorthosis and Nea Salamina for the official competitions (Cypriot First Division, Cypriot Cup) per stadium.

At GSE Stadium, the common stadium of the two teams before the occupation of Famagusta, 34 league matches were played between the two teams. Anorthosis won 17, Nea Salamina won 10 and the remaining 7 ended in a draw.

Stadium	Competition	Games	Anorthosis wins	Drawn	Nea Salamina wins	Anorthosis GF	Nea Salamis GF
GSE Stadium	Cypriot First Division	34	17	7	10	58	44
GSE Stadium	Cypriot Cup	7	4	2	1	9	5
GSE Stadium	Total	41	21	9	11	67	49
Antonis Papadopoulos Stadium	Cypriot First Division	33	24	8	1	68	23
Antonis Papadopoulos Stadium	Cypriot Cup	1	1	0	0	1	0
Antonis Papadopoulos Stadium	Total	34	25	8	1	69	23
Ammochostos Stadium	Cypriot First Division	23	15	4	4	47	22
Ammochostos Stadium	Cypriot Cup	1	0	1	0	0	0
Ammochostos Stadium	Total	24	15	5	4	47	22
GSZ Stadium (1928)	Cypriot First Division	7	1	3	3	8	13
Dasaki Stadium	Cypriot First Division	6	2	3	1	12	10
GSZ Stadium	Cypriot First Division	5	1	3	1	4	3
Tsirio Stadium	Cypriot First Division	2	2	0	0	2	0
Famagusta Municipal Stadium	Cypriot First Division	1	0	1	0	0	0
Paralimni Municipal Stadium	Cypriot First Division	1	0	0	1	0	1
Anagennisi Football Ground	Cypriot First Division	1	0	1	0	0	0
Paralimni Stadium	Cypriot First Division	1	0	1	0	0	0
Aradippou Municipal Stadium	Cypriot First Division	1	0	1	0	0	0
Total		124	67	35	22	209	121

With Anorthosis as home team The tables below present the history of all matches with Anorthosis as home team for the official competitions (Cypriot First Division, Cypriot Cup) per stadium.

Stadium	Competition	Games	Anorthosis wins	Drawn	Nea Salamina wins	Anorthosis GF	Nea Salamis GF
Antonis Papadopoulos Stadium	Cypriot First Division	28	20	7	1	61	21
Antonis Papadopoulos Stadium	Cypriot Cup	1	1	0	0	1	0
Antonis Papadopoulos Stadium	Total	29	21	7	1	62	21
GSE Stadium	Cypriot First Division	16	10	2	4	31	21
GSE Stadium	Cypriot Cup	4	2	1	1	4	3
GSE Stadium	Total	20	12	3	5	35	24
Dasaki Stadium	Cypriot First Division	4	2	1	1	10	8
GSZ Stadium (1928)	Cypriot First Division	3	1	1	1	5	7
Tsirio Stadium	Cypriot First Division	2	2	0	0	2	0
Famagusta Municipal Stadium	Cypriot First Division	1	0	1	0	0	0
Paralimni Municipal Stadium	Cypriot First Division	1	0	0	1	0	1
Paralimni Stadium	Cypriot First Division	1	0	1	0	0	0
Aradippou Municipal Stadium	Cypriot First Division	1	0	1	0	0	0
Total		62	38	15	9	114	61

With Nea Salamis as home team

The tables below present the history of all matches with Nea Salamis as home team for the official competitions (Cypriot First Division, Cypriot Cup) per stadium.

Stadium	Competition	Games	Anorthosis wins	Drawn	Nea Salamina wins	Anorthosis GF	Nea Salamis GF
Ammochostos Stadium	Cypriot First Division	23	15	4	4	47	22
Ammochostos Stadium	Cypriot Cup	1	0	1	0	0	0
Ammochostos Stadium	Total	24	15	5	4	47	22
GSE Stadium	Cypriot First Division	18	7	5	6	27	23
GSE Stadium	Cypriot Cup	3	2	1	0	5	2
GSE Stadium	Total	21	9	6	6	32	25
Antonis Papadopoulos Stadium	Cypriot First Division	5	4	1	0	7	2
GSZ Stadium	Cypriot First Division	5	1	3	1	4	3
GSZ Stadium (1928)	Cypriot First Division	4	0	2	2	3	6
Dasaki Stadium	Cypriot First Division	2	0	2	0	2	2
Anagennisi Football Ground	Cypriot First Division	1	0	1	0	0	0
Total		62	29	20	13	95	60

=== Results frequency ===
Total

The table below shows the frequency of the results of the games between the two teams (regardless of home team and competition).

Result	Frequency	Anorthosis win	Nea Salamina win
0–0	16	-	-
1–0	22	16	6
1–1	17	-	-
2–0	11	7	4
2–1	15	10	5
2–2	1	-	-
3–0	6	5	1
3–1	13	11	2
3–2	6	5	1
3–3	1	-	-
4–0	2	1	1
4–1	5	4	1
4–2	2	2	0
4–3	1	0	1
5–0	1	1	0
5–1	1	1	0
5–2	1	1	0
5–3	1	1	0
6–5	1	1	0
7-1	1	1	0
Total	124	67	22

Analytics

The table below shows the frequency of the results of the games between the two teams by home teams (regardless of competition).

Result	Anorthosis home	Nea Salamis home
0–0	8	8
0–1	2	6
0–2	1	2
0–3	0	4
0–4	1	1
1–0	10	4
1–1	7	10
1–2	2	5
1–3	1	5
1–4	1	1
1–5	0	1
2–0	5	3
2-1	5	3
2–2	0	1
2–3	0	3
2–5	0	1
3–0	1	1
3–1	6	1
3–2	2	1
3–3	0	1
3–4	1	0
4–1	3	0
4–2	2	0
5–0	1	0
5–3	1	0
6–5	1	0
7–1	1	0
Total	62	62

=== Players in both teams ===
The following table shows players who played for both Famagusta teams.

Player	Seasons in Anorthosis	Seasons in Nea Salamina
Pambis Andreou	1997-1999	1987-1997, 1999-2003
Marko Anđić	2011-2015	2015-2016
Demetris Assiotis	1992-1997	2003
Paris Elia	1997-1998	1998-2000, 2005-2006
Andreas Melanarkitis	1996-1997, 1999-2001	1997-1998
Milan Belić	2007-2008	2010-2011
Lambros Lambrou	1998–1999, 2006-2009	2010-2011
Marios Neophytou	1999-2003	2008-2009
Nikos Nicolaou	2001-2009	1991-2001
Hamad Ndikumana	2007-2008	2006-2007
Siniša Dobrašinović	2008-2009	2013-2014
Ioannis Okkas	1997–2000, 2009-2014	1993-1997
Giorgos Panagi	2007-2009	2002-2007, 2013-2014
Giannis Skopelitis	2007, 2008–2011, 2012-2013	2015-2017
Klimenti Tsitaishvili	2003-2006, 2008-2009	2009-2010
Stavros Foukaris	1992-2002	2002-2003
Kyriacos Chailis	1998-2000, 2001-2003	2005-2007, 2011
Marco Haber	2004-2006	2006-2007

== Sources ==
- Επιτρόπου, Τάσος (2014-11-15). "Ένα ντέρμπι με συναισθηματική αξία" (in Greek). dinataathlitika.gr. Archived from the original on 2016-12-03.
- Μιχαήλ, Μιχάλης (2016-04-01). "Τα καμάρια της Αμμοχώστου και το Βαρωσιώτικο ντέρμπι!" (in Greek). Archived from the original on 2016-05-25.
- "Δήμος Αμμοχώστου-Αθλητισμός" (in Greek). Archived from the original on 2016-12-02.
- Προϊστορία Νέα Σαλαμίνα vs Ανόρθωση

== Bibliography ==
- Gavreilides, Michalis; Papamoiseos, Stelios (2001). Ένας αιώνας Κυπριακό ποδόσφαιρο [One century Cypriot football] (in Greek). Nicosia: The writer. ISBN 9963-8720-1-8.
- Meletiou, Giorgos (2011). Κυπριακό ποδόσφαιρο 1900–1960 [Cypriot Football 1900–1960] (in Greek). Nicosia: Power Publishing. ISBN 978-9963-688-87-6.
- Stilianou, Pampos; Georgiou, Neofitos (1988). Νέα Σαλαμίνα, 40 χρόνια πρωτοπόρας αθλητικής πορείας [Nea Salamina, 40 years pioneering sports history] (in Greek). Cyprus: Nea Salamis Famagusta.
- Stilianou, Pampos (1998). 50 χρόνια Νέα Σαλαμίνα 1948–1998 [50 years Nea Salamina 1948–1998] (in Greek). Cyprus: Nea Salamis Famagusta. ISBN 9963-8370-0-X.
- Papamoiseos, Stelios (2013). Από την ενοποίηση... στα αστέρια [From unification... to the stars] (in Greek). Nicosia: The writer. pp. 150–151.
- Stephanidis, Giorgos (2015). Μεγάλες Στιγμές Κυπριακού Ποδοσφαίρου 1934-2014 [Important moments of Cypriot Football 1934-2014] (in Greek). Cyprus. pp. 141–148. ISBN 978-9963-8841-3-1.
