= List of APOEL FC seasons =

APOEL FC (Greek: ΑΠΟΕΛ Ποδόσφαιρο) is a professional football club founded in 1926 and based in Nicosia, Cyprus. This list has details about APOEL's achievements in major Cypriot and European competitions.

APOEL is the most successful football club in Cyprus with an overall tally of 28 Championships, 21 Cups and 14 Super Cups. Also, they have appeared 42 times in European competitions, qualifying to the UEFA Champions League group stages for the first time in their history during the 2009–10 season. They participated again in the Champions League group stages in the 2011–12 season, qualifying for the quarter-finals of the competition by topping their group and eliminating Lyon in the last 16, becoming the only Cypriot club to reach the UEFA Champions League quarter-finals. APOEL qualified for the third time to the Champions League group stages in the 2014–15 season. They also participated in the group stages of the 2013–14 and 2015–16 UEFA Europa League, managing to reach the last 16 of the competition during the 2016–17 season, when they topped their group and eliminated Athletic Bilbao in the round of 32. APOEL is the only Cypriot club who have reached the group stages (and the knockout stages) of both major UEFA competitions (UEFA Champions League & UEFA Europa League).

== Key ==
Key to league record:

- P = Played
- W = Games won
- D = Games drawn
- L = Games lost
- F = Goals for
- A = Goals against
- Pts = Points
- Pos = Final position

Key to divisions:

- 1st = Cypriot First Division
- A' Ethniki = Alpha Ethniki (Greece)

Key to rounds:

- X = Competition not held
- PR = Preliminary round
- Q1 = 1st Qualifying round
- Q2 = 2nd Qualifying round
- Q3 = 3rd Qualifying round
- PO = Play-off round
- R1 = Round 1
- R2 = Round 2
- R3 = Round 3
- Grp = Group stage
- R32 = Round of 32
- R16 = Last 16
- QF = Quarter-finals
- SF = Semi-finals
- RU = Runners-up
- W = Winners

1st or W	Winners
2nd or RU	Runners-up

== Seasons ==
Season	League									Cup	Europe / Other	
Season	Division	P	W	D	L	F	A	Pts	Pos	Cup	Europe / Other	
1934–35	1st	14	7	1	6	25	20	15	3rd	RU		
1935–36	1st	14	12	0	2	52	15	24	1st	SF		
1936–37	1st	12	8	3	1	41	12	19	1st	W		
1937–38	1st	6	5	1	0	29	11	11	1st	SF		
1938–39	1st	11	9	2	0	36	11	20	1st	RU		
1939–40	1st	10	7	2	1	30	10	16	1st	SF		
1940–41	1st	7	6	0	1	41	8	12	2nd	W		
1944–45	1st	10	8	1	1	40	13	17	2nd	RU		
1945–46	1st	10	7	1	2	37	12	15	2nd	RU		
1946–47	1st	12	12	0	0	44	9	24	1st	W		
1947–48	1st	8	7	1	0	37	7	15	1st	RU		
1948–49	1st	14	14	0	0	51	20	28	1st	RU		
1949–50	1st	14	8	1	5	38	21	17	3rd	QF		
1950–51	1st	14	6	6	2	38	21	18	2nd	W		
1951–52	1st	14	10	2	2	48	23	22	1st	SF	Pakkos Shield	RU
1952–53	1st	14	6	5	3	33	25	17	3rd	QF	Pakkos Shield	RU
1953–54	1st	16	10	2	4	22	18	22	2nd	QF		
1954–55	1st	18	8	7	3	37	25	23	3rd	R1		
1955–56	1st	16	9	3	4	30	16	21	2nd	X		
1956–57	1st	16	2	6	8	20	31	10	9th	X		
1957–58	1st	16	5	5	6	20	23	15	6th	X		
1958–59	League abandoned									SF		
1959–60	1st	20	8	7	5	35	22	23	3rd	X		
1960–61	1st	24	13	2	9	62	41	28	5th	X		
1961–62	1st	24	8	6	10	48	46	22	9th	R1		
1962–63	1st	22	13	6	3	49	26	32	2nd	W		
1963–64	1st	7	5	1	1	18	7	11	2nd	RU	Pakkos Shield	W
1963–64	1st	7	5	1	1	18	7	11	2nd	RU	UEFA Cup Winners' Cup	R1
1964–65	1st	20	16	2	2	68	23	34	1st	R1	Pakkos Shield	RU
1965–66	1st	20	7	3	10	43	29	17	7th	R1	European Cup	PR
1966–67	1st	22	15	3	4	89	33	33	2nd	QF		
1967–68	1st	22	6	6	10	55	44	18	9th	W		
1968–69	1st	22	9	2	11	32	33	20	8th	W	Pakkos Shield	RU
1968–69	1st	22	9	2	11	32	33	20	8th	W	UEFA Cup Winners' Cup	R1
1969–70	1st	22	9	5	8	35	32	23	4th	SF	UEFA Cup Winners' Cup	R1
1970–71	1st	22	8	10	4	30	19	26	3rd	SF		
1971–72	1st	22	8	5	9	29	23	21	7th	SF		
1972–73	1st	26	17	8	1	35	11	42	1st	W		
1973–74	A' Ethniki	34	11	5	18	39	48	27	14th		European Cup	R1
1974–75	1st	Unofficial participation								R1		
1975–76	1st	28	17	8	3	65	18	42	2nd	W		
1976–77	1st	30	22	7	1	77	15	51	2nd	R1	UEFA Cup Winners' Cup	R2
1977–78	1st	30	17	7	6	47	20	41	2nd	W	UEFA Cup	R1
1978–79	1st	30	20	4	6	54	18	44	2nd	W	UEFA Cup Winners' Cup	R1
1979–80	1st	28	23	2	3	72	19	48	1st	QF	Stylianakis Shield	RU
1979–80	1st	28	23	2	3	72	19	48	1st	QF	UEFA Cup Winners' Cup	PR
1980–81	1st	26	13	10	3	41	16	36	2nd	R1	Stylianakis Shield	RU
1980–81	1st	26	13	10	3	41	16	36	2nd	R1	European Cup	R1
1981–82	1st	26	10	14	2	29	14	34	3rd	SF	UEFA Cup	R1
1982–83	1st	26	11	10	5	33	20	32	3rd	SF		
1983–84	1st	26	12	9	5	42	23	33	4th	W		
1984–85	1st	26	13	8	5	43	26	34	2nd	QF	Stylianakis Shield	W
1984–85	1st	26	13	8	5	43	26	34	2nd	QF	UEFA Cup Winners' Cup	R1
1985–86	1st	26	22	3	1	61	12	47	1st	RU	UEFA Cup	R1
1986–87	1st	30	19	9	2	58	11	47	2nd	QF	Stylianakis Shield	W
1986–87	1st	30	19	9	2	58	11	47	2nd	QF	European Cup	R2
1987–88	1st	30	22	3	5	66	23	47	2nd	SF		
1988–89	1st	28	15	4	9	48	38	34	3rd	SF	UEFA Cup	R1
1989–90	1st	26	18	5	3	45	19	41	1st	R2		
1990–91	1st	26	13	9	4	48	23	35	3rd	R1	Cyprus FA Shield	RU
1990–91	1st	26	13	9	4	48	23	35	3rd	R1	European Cup	R1
1991–92	1st	26	18	6	2	68	26	60	1st	QF		
1992–93	1st	26	12	7	7	52	39	43	4th	W	Cyprus FA Shield	W
1992–93	1st	26	12	7	7	52	39	43	4th	W	UEFA Champions League	R1
1993–94	1st	26	17	5	4	64	25	56	3rd	SF	Cyprus FA Shield	W
1993–94	1st	26	17	5	4	64	25	56	3rd	SF	UEFA Cup Winners' Cup	R1
1994–95	1st	33	13	7	13	43	43	46	5th	W		
1995–96	1st	26	19	7	0	65	21	64	1st	W	Cyprus FA Shield	RU
1995–96	1st	26	19	7	0	65	21	64	1st	W	UEFA Cup Winners' Cup	R1
1996–97	1st	26	12	4	10	57	43	40	5th	W	Cyprus FA Shield	W
1996–97	1st	26	12	4	10	57	43	40	5th	W	UEFA Cup	R1
1997–98	1st	26	8	7	11	48	51	31	7th	QF	Cyprus FA Shield	W
1997–98	1st	26	8	7	11	48	51	31	7th	QF	UEFA Cup Winners' Cup	R1
1998–99	1st	26	19	2	5	70	29	59	3rd	W		
1999–00	1st	26	14	4	8	58	31	46	3rd	RU	Cyprus FA Shield	RU
1999–00	1st	26	14	4	8	58	31	46	3rd	RU	UEFA Cup	PR
2000–01	1st	26	12	8	6	58	37	44	5th	SF	UEFA Cup	R1
2001–02	1st	26	18	5	3	66	22	59	1st	R1		
2002–03	1st	26	16	7	3	55	24	55	3rd	SF	Cyprus FA Shield	W
2002–03	1st	26	16	7	3	55	24	55	3rd	SF	UEFA Champions League	Q3
2002–03	1st	26	16	7	3	55	24	55	3rd	SF	UEFA Cup	R2
2003–04	1st	26	20	5	1	56	20	65	1st	SF	UEFA Cup	R1
2004–05	1st	26	17	7	2	56	21	58	2nd	SF	Cyprus FA Shield	W
2004–05	1st	26	17	7	2	56	21	58	2nd	SF	UEFA Champions League	Q2
2005–06	1st	26	19	5	2	62	22	62	3rd	W	UEFA Cup	R1
2006–07	1st	26	20	4	2	59	22	64	1st	SF	Cyprus FA Shield	RU
2006–07	1st	26	20	4	2	59	22	64	1st	SF	UEFA Cup	Q2
2007–08	1st	32	18	7	7	58	28	61	2nd	W	Cyprus FA Shield	RU
2007–08	1st	32	18	7	7	58	28	61	2nd	W	UEFA Champions League	Q1
2008–09	1st	32	26	4	2	62	17	82	1st	SF	LTV Super Cup	W
2008–09	1st	32	26	4	2	62	17	82	1st	SF	UEFA Cup	R1
2009–10	1st	32	19	8	5	53	24	65	2nd	RU	LTV Super Cup	W
2009–10	1st	32	19	8	5	53	24	65	2nd	RU	UEFA Champions League	Grp
2010–11	1st	32	24	2	6	63	22	74	1st	R2	UEFA Europa League	PO
2011–12	1st	32	20	6	6	46	19	66	2nd	R2	LTV Super Cup	W
2011–12	1st	32	20	6	6	46	19	66	2nd	R2	UEFA Champions League	QF
2012–13	1st	32	23	4	5	62	19	73	1st	R2	UEFA Europa League	PO
2013–14	1st	36	25	6	5	80	25	81	1st	W	LTV Super Cup	W
2013–14	1st	36	25	6	5	80	25	81	1st	W	UEFA Champions League	Q3
2013–14	1st	36	25	6	5	80	25	81	1st	W	UEFA Europa League	Grp
2014–15	1st	32	17	11	4	52	26	62	1st	W	Cypriot Super Cup	RU
2014–15	1st	32	17	11	4	52	26	62	1st	W	UEFA Champions League	Grp
2015–16	1st	36	26	5	5	91	26	83	1st	SF	Cypriot Super Cup	RU
2015–16	1st	36	26	5	5	91	26	83	1st	SF	UEFA Champions League	PO
2015–16	1st	36	26	5	5	91	26	83	1st	SF	UEFA Europa League	Grp
2016–17	1st	36	24	8	4	77	24	80	1st	RU	Cypriot Super Cup	RU
2016–17	1st	36	24	8	4	77	24	80	1st	RU	UEFA Champions League	PO
2016–17	1st	36	24	8	4	77	24	80	1st	RU	UEFA Europa League	R16
2017–18	1st	36	27	5	4	92	35	86	1st	SF	Cypriot Super Cup	RU
2017–18	1st	36	27	5	4	92	35	86	1st	SF	UEFA Champions League	Grp
2018–19	1st	32	21	7	4	66	25	70	1st	RU	Cypriot Super Cup	RU
2018–19	1st	32	21	7	4	66	25	70	1st	RU	UEFA Champions League	Q1
2018–19	1st	32	21	7	4	66	25	70	1st	RU	UEFA Europa League	PO
2019–20	1st	23	11	7	5	36	16	40	3rd	X	Cypriot Super Cup	W
2019–20	1st	23	11	7	5	36	16	40	3rd	X	UEFA Champions League	PO
2019–20	1st	23	11	7	5	36	16	40	3rd	X	UEFA Europa League	R32
2020–21	1st	40	17	9	14	48	39	60	8th	SF	UEFA Europa League	PO
2021–22	1st	32	14	10	8	48	41	52	3rd	QF		
