= Cypriot First Division top goalscorers =

Established in 1934, the Cypriot First Division is the top-tier league of Cypriot football. This article contains the list of the competition's top goalscorers from the 1960–61 season onwards, as well as various player records.

The contents of this article are accurate as of the 2023–24 season.

== List of top goalscorers ==
=== By season ===
Season	Top scorer(s)	Club(s)	Goals
1960–61	(Cyprus) Panikos Krystallis	Apollon Limassol	26
1961–62	(Cyprus) Michalis Shialis	Pompoi	22
1962–63	(Cyprus) Panikos Papadopoulos	AEL Limassol	24
1963–64	Championship abandoned		
1964–65	(Cyprus) Kostakis Pierides	Olympiakos Nicosia	21
1965–66	(Cyprus) Panikos Efthymiades	Olympiakos Nicosia	20
1966–67	(Cyprus) Andreas Stylianou	APOEL	29
1967–68	(Cyprus) Pamboullis Papadopoulos	AEL Limassol	31
1968–69	(Cyprus) Panikos Efthymiades	Olympiakos Nicosia	17
1969–70	(Cyprus) Tasos Constantinou	EPA Larnaca	24
1970–71	(Cyprus) Andreas Stylianou (Cyprus) Kostas Vasiliades (Cyprus) Panikos Efthymiades	APOEL; Apollon Limassol; Olympiakos Nicosia	11
1971–72	(Cyprus) Sotiris Kaiafas	Omonia	12
1972–73	(Cyprus) Sotiris Kaiafas	Omonoia	17
1973–74	(Cyprus) Sotiris Kaiafas	Omonia	20
1974–75	(Cyprus) Andros Savva	Omonia	21
1975–76	(Cyprus) Sotiris Kaiafas	Omonia	39
1976–77	(Cyprus) Sotiris Kaiafas	Omonia	44
1977–78	(Cyprus) Andreas Kanaris	Omonia	20
1978–79	(Cyprus) Sotiris Kaiafas	Omonia	28
1979–80	(Cyprus) Sotiris Kaiafas	Omonia	23
1980–81	(Cyprus) Sotiris Kaiafas	Omonia	14
1981–82	(Cyprus) Sotiris Kaiafas	Omonia	19
1982–83	(Cyprus) Panikos Hatziloizou	Aris Limassol	17
1983–84	(Cyprus) Sylvester Vernon (Cyprus) Lenos Kittos	Pezoporikos; Ermis Aradippou	14
1984–85	(Cyprus) Giorgos Savvidis	Omonia	24
1985–86	(Cyprus) Yiannos Ioannou	APOEL	22
1986–87	(Bulgaria) Spas Dzhevizov	Omonia	32
1987–88	(Cyprus) Tasos Zouvanis	E.N. Paralimni	23
1988–89	(England) Nigel McNeal	Nea Salamina	19
1989–90	(Serbia) (Cyprus) Siniša Gogić	APOEL	19
1990–91	(Bosnia and Herzegovina) Suad Beširević (Cyprus) Panikos Xiourouppas	Apollon Limassol; Omonia	19
1991–92	(Hungary) József Dzurják	Omonia	21
1992–93	(Serbia) Slađan Šćepović	Apollon Limassol	25
1993–94	(Serbia) (Cyprus) Siniša Gogić	Anorthosis	26
1994–95	(Cyprus) Pambis Andreou	Nea Salamina	25
1995–96	(Hungary) József Kiprich	APOEL	25
1996–97	(Cyprus) Michalis Konstantinou	E.N. Paralimni	17
1997–98	(Germany) (Cyprus) Rainer Rauffmann	Omonia	42
1998–99	(Germany) (Cyprus) Rainer Rauffmann	Omonia	35
1999–2000	(Germany) (Cyprus) Rainer Rauffmann	Omonia	34
2000–01	(Germany) (Cyprus) Rainer Rauffmann	Omonia	30
2001–02	(Poland) Wojciech Kowalczyk	Anorthosis	22
2002–03	(Cyprus) Marios Neophytou	Anorthosis	33
2003–04	(Poland) Łukasz Sosin (Slovakia) Jozef Kožlej	Apollon Limassol; Omonia	21
2004–05	(Poland) Łukasz Sosin	Apollon Limassol	21
2005–06	(Poland) Łukasz Sosin	Apollon Limassol	28
2006–07	(Argentina) Esteban Solari	APOEL	20
2007–08	(Brazil) David da Costa (Poland) Łukasz Sosin	Doxa Katokopias; Anorthosis	16
2008–09	(Brazil) Serjão	Doxa Katokopias	24
2009–10	(Brazil) Joeano (Cape Verde) José Semedo	Ermis Aradippou; APOP Kinyras	22
2010–11	(Serbia) Miljan Mrdaković	Apollon Limassol	21
2011–12	(Angola) Freddy	Omonia	17
2012–13	(Portugal) Bernardo Vasconcelos	Alki Larnaca	18
2013–14	(Argentina) Gastón Sangoy (Nigeria) Marco Tagbajumi (Portugal) Jorge Monteiro	Apollon Limassol; Ermis Aradippou; AEL Limassol	18
2014–15	(Benin) Mickaël Poté	Omonia	17
2015–16	(Argentina) Fernando Cavenaghi (Brazil) André Alves (Bulgaria) Dimitar Makriev	APOEL; AEK Larnaca; Nea Salamina	19
2016–17	(England) Matt Derbyshire	Omonia	24
2017–18	(England) Matt Derbyshire	Omonia	23
2018–19	(Slovakia) Adam Nemec	Pafos FC	16
2019–20	(North Macedonia) Ivan Trichkovski	AEK Larnaca	20
2020–21	(France) Nicolas Diguiny	Apollon Limassol	17 (Ch.)
2020–21	(Finland) Berat Sadik	Doxa Katokopias	18 (Rel.)
2021–22	(North Macedonia) Ivan Trichkovski	AEK Larnaca	15
2022–23	(Brazil) Jairo (Cyprus) Ioannis Pittas	Pafos FC; Apollon Limassol	18 (Ch.)
2022–23	(Argentina) Diego Dorregaray	Nea Salamina	16 (Rel.)
2023–24	(Brazil) Jairo	Pafos FC	16 (Ch.)
2023–24	(Cyprus) Marios Elia (Cyprus) Andreas Katsantonis	Ethnikos Achna; Karmiotissa	19 (Rel.)

==== Notes ====
- The 2019–20 campaign was abandoned before the end of the season due to the COVID-19 pandemic.
- In 2020–21 and from 2022–23 onwards, the Cyprus Football Association officially names a separate top scorer for each of the two groups, since the teams in the Relegation Group play more games than those in the Championship Group.

=== By club ===
Club	Won	Players
Omonia	23	Sotiris Kaiafas (8), Rainer Rauffmann (4), Matt Derbyshire (2), Andros Savva (1), Andreas Kanaris (1), Giorgos Savvidis (1), Spas Dzhevizov (1), Panikos Xiourouppas (1), József Dzurják (1), Jozef Kožlej (1), Freddy (1), Mickaël Poté (1)
Apollon Limassol	11	Łukasz Sosin (3), Panikos Krystallis (1), Kostas Vasiliadis (1), Suad Beširević (1), Slađan Šćepović (1), Miljan Mrdaković (1), Gastón Sangoy (1), Nicolas Diguiny (1), Ioannis Pittas (1)
APOEL	7	Andreas Stylianou (2), Yiannos Ioannou (1), Siniša Gogić (1), József Kiprich (1), Esteban Solari (1), Fernando Cavenaghi (1)
Anorthosis Famagusta	5	Michalis Shialis (1), Siniša Gogić (1), Wojciech Kowalczyk (1), Marios Neophytou (1), Łukasz Sosin (1)
Olympiakos Nicosia	4	Kostakis Pieridis (2), Panikos Efthymiades (2)
Nea Salamina Famagusta	4	Nigel McNeal (1), Pambis Andreou (1), Dimitar Makriev (1), Diego Dorregaray (1)
AEL Limassol	3	Panikos Papadopoulos (1), Charamalambos Papadopoulos (1), Jorge Monteiro (1)
Ermis Aradippou	3	Lenos Kittos (1), Joeano (1), Marco Tagbajumi (1)
AEK Larnaca	3	Ivan Trichkovski (2), André Alves (1)
Doxa Katokopias	3	David da Costa (1), Serjão (1), Berat Sadik (1)
Pafos FC	3	Jairo (2), Adam Nemec (1)
EPA Larnaca	2	Tasos Constantinou (1), Lakis Theodorou (1)
Alki Larnaca	1	Bernardo Vasconcelos (1)
APOP Kinyras	1	José Semedo (1)
Aris Limassol	1	Panikos Hatziloizou (1)
E.N. Paralimni	1	Michalis Konstantinou (1)
Pezoporikos	1	Sylvester Vernon (1)
Ethnikos Achna	1	Marios Elia (1)
Karmiotissa	1	Andreas Katsantonis (1)

=== By nationality ===
Nationality	Total	Players
Cyprus	36	25
Brazil	6	5
Poland	5	2
Serbia	4	3
Germany	4	1
Argentina	4	4
England	3	2
Bulgaria	2	2
Hungary	2	2
Slovakia	2	2
Portugal	2	2
North Macedonia	2	1
Bosnia and Herzegovina	1	1
Cape Verde	1	1
Angola	1	1
Nigeria	1	1
Benin	1	1
France	1	1
Finland	1	1

Note: For the purpose of the above list, Rainer Rauffmann is considered German and Siniša Gogić is considered Serbian.

== Player records ==
- Most total goals: 261, (Cyprus) Sotiris Kaiafas (1967–1984)
- Most goals in a season: 44, (Cyprus) Sotiris Kaiafas (1976–77)
- Most seasons as top goalscorer: 8, (Cyprus) Sotiris Kaiafas
- Most consecutive seasons as top goalscorer: 4
  - (Cyprus) Sotiris Kaiafas (1979–1982)
  - (Germany) (Cyprus) Rainer Rauffmann (1998–2001)
- Most consecutive games with at least one goal scored: 9
  - (Germany) (Cyprus) Rainer Rauffmann (1999–2000)
  - (Portugal) Bernardo Vasconcelos (2012–13)
  - (Portugal) Marco Paixão (2012–13)

== Sources ==
- Cyprus – List of Topscorers
