= Nicosia derby =

Match between rival football teams in Cyprus

Derby of the Eternal Enemies
- Location: Nicosia
- Teams: APOEL; Omonia
- First meeting: Omonia 0–0 APOEL (12 December 1953)
- Latest meeting: APOEL 0-3 Omonia (16 May 2026)
- Next meeting: TBA

Statistics
- Total meetings: 200
- Most wins: APOEL (81)
- Top scorer: Georgios Efrem (12)
- Largest victory: APOEL 0 - 5 Omonia (6 November 1988)

The Derby of the Eternal Enemies (Greek: Ντέρμπι των αιωνίων αντιπάλων) refers to Nicosia's local derby, football matches played between APOEL and Omonia. It is the classic, biggest rivalry in Cypriot football, as the two teams are the most successful and most popular football clubs of the island. The rivalry is also indicative of social, cultural and political differences.

In recent years, APOEL's successes in European Competitions, combined with Omonia's financial struggles, have led to APOEL mostly dominating the rivalry. A seven-and-a-half year long winless streak for Omonia came to an end on 7 December 2020.

== Background ==
The derby originates from 1948 when the board of APOEL FC sent a telegram to the Hellenic Association of Amateur Athletics (Greek: Σ.Ε.Γ.Α.Σ.), with the opportunity of the annual Panhellenic Track and Field Competition stating its wish for the "communist mutiny" to be ended. Club's players considering this action as a political comment on the Greek Civil War distanced themselves or were expelled from APOEL. A month later these players formed AC Omonia. The first derby was played on 12 December 1953 and ended in a goalless draw.

== Records and statistics ==
Last update: 1 May 2023

=== Summary ===
Team	Played	Won	Drawn	Lost	Goals for	Goals against
APOEL	200	81	58	62	288	238
Omonia	200	62	58	81	238	288
Total	200	143	58	143	526	526

=== Statistics by competition ===
Competition	Played	APOEL	Draws	Omonia
First Division	161	62	50	50
Cup	34	16	8	10
Super Cup	5	3	0	2
Total	200	81	58	62

The table below shows the results of the two teams in the Cypriot First Division.

Year	Fixture	Date	Home team	Stadium	Result
1953-54		12-12-1953	Omonia	Old GSP Stadium	0 – 0
1953-54		09-01-1954	APOEL	Old GSP Stadium	1 – 0
1954-55		04-12-1954	APOEL	Old GSP Stadium	0 – 0
1954-55		18-05-1955	Omonia	Old GSP Stadium	0 – 2
1955-56		24-12-1955	Omonia	Old GSP Stadium	0 – 0
1955-56		31-03-1956	APOEL	Old GSP Stadium	1 – 2
1956-57		02-05-1957	APOEL	Old GSP Stadium	1 – 2
1956-57		30-06-1957	Omonia	Old GSP Stadium	2 – 1
1957-58		01-03-1958	Omonia	Old GSP Stadium	1 – 0
1957-58		11-05-1958	APOEL	Old GSP Stadium	1 – 1
1959-60		29-11-1959	Omonia	Old GSP Stadium	1 – 0
1959-60		19-03-1960	APOEL	Old GSP Stadium	1 – 2
1960-61		03-12-1960	APOEL	Old GSP Stadium	1 – 3
1960-61		04-03-1961	Omonia	Old GSP Stadium	3 – 2
1961-62		20-12-1961	Omonia	Old GSP Stadium	2 – 0
1961-62		20-06-1962	APOEL	Old GSP Stadium	2 – 3
1962-63		17-11-1962	APOEL	Old GSP Stadium	3 – 1
1962-63		02-03-1963	Omonia	Old GSP Stadium	2 – 2
1963-64		19-10-1963	Omonia	Old GSP Stadium	1 – 0
1964-65		05-12-1964	Omonia	Old GSP Stadium	1 – 5
1964-65		17-04-1965	APOEL	Old GSP Stadium	3 – 2
1965-66		27-11-1965	Omonia	Old GSP Stadium	2 – 2
1965-66		28-02-1966	APOEL	Old GSP Stadium	0 – 2
1966-67		28-11-1966	Omonia	Old GSP Stadium	1 – 1
1966-67		18-02-1967	APOEL	Old GSP Stadium	2 – 2
1967-68		13-11-1967	APOEL	Old GSP Stadium	1 – 1
1967-68		10-03-1968	Omonia	Old GSP Stadium	2 – 6
1968-69		04-01-1969	APOEL	Old GSP Stadium	0 – 1
1968-69		01-03-1969	Omonia	Old GSP Stadium	2 – 1
1969-70		02-11-1969	APOEL	Old GSP Stadium	3 – 2
1969-70		01-02-1970	Omonia	Old GSP Stadium	1 – 0
1970-71		10-10-1970	Omonia	Old GSP Stadium	2 – 4
1970-71		10-02-1971	APOEL	Old GSP Stadium	0 – 0
1971-72		10-10-1971	APOEL	Old GSP Stadium	1 – 1
1971-72		09-01-1972	Omonia	Old GSP Stadium	1 – 0
1975-76	3rd Fixture	19-10-1975	Omonia	Old GSP Stadium	0 – 1
1975-76	16th Fixture	01-02-1976	APOEL	Old GSP Stadium	0 – 1
1976-77		16-01-1977	Omonia	Old GSP Stadium	0 – 3
1976-77		30-04-1977	APOEL	Old GSP Stadium	0 – 0
1977-78		14-01-1978	Omonia	Old GSP Stadium	1 – 1
1977-78		23-04-1978	APOEL	Old GSP Stadium	1 – 2
1978-79		03-12-1978	APOEL	Old GSP Stadium	0 – 0
1978-79		18-03-1979	Omonia	Makario Stadium	1 – 1
1979-80		24-11-1979	Omonia	Makario Stadium	1 – 0
1979-80		23-10-1980	APOEL	Makario Stadium	1 – 2
1980-81		04-01-1981	Omonia	Makario Stadium	2 – 1
1980-81		04-04-1981	APOEL	Makario Stadium	1 – 0
1981-82		25-10-1981	APOEL	Makario Stadium	1 – 1
1981-82		30-01-1982	Omonia	Makario Stadium	1 – 0
1982-83		10-10-1982	APOEL	Makario Stadium	0 – 0
1982-83		16-01-1983	Omonia	Makario Stadium	1 – 0
1983-84		30-10-1983	Omonia	Makario Stadium	1 – 1
1983-84		12-02-1984	APOEL	Makario Stadium	2 – 2
1984-85		20-01-1985	Omonia	Makario Stadium	5 – 3
1984-85		18-05-1985	APOEL	Makario Stadium	0 – 0
1985-86		15-12-1985	Omonia	Makario Stadium	0 – 2
1985-86		15-03-1986	APOEL	Makario Stadium	1 – 1
1986-87		25-10-1986	APOEL	Makario Stadium	1 – 0
1986-87		01-03-1987	Omonia	Makario Stadium	2 – 1
1987-88		24-01-1988	Omonia	Makario Stadium	0 – 0
1987-88		29-05-1988	APOEL	Makario Stadium	1 – 0
1988-89		06-11-1988	APOEL	Makario Stadium	0 – 5
1988-89		19-02-1989	Omonia	Makario Stadium	0 – 1
1989-90		15-10-1989	Omonia	Makario Stadium	1 – 2
1989-90		11-02-1990	APOEL	Makario Stadium	1 – 0
1990-91		04-11-1990	APOEL	Makario Stadium	1 – 1
1990-91		09-02-1991	Omonia	Makario Stadium	1 – 2
1991-92		14-12-1991	APOEL	Makario Stadium	2 – 0
1991-92		22-03-1992	Omonia	Makario Stadium	3 – 3
1992-93		13-01-1993	APOEL	Tsirio Stadium	2 – 2
1992-93		15-05-1993	Omonia	Makario Stadium	3 – 2
1993-94		09-01-1994	Omonia	Makario Stadium	3 – 1
1993-94		16-04-1994	APOEL	Makario Stadium	3 – 2
1994-95		29-10-1994	Omonia	Makario Stadium	5 – 2
1994-95		14-01-1995	APOEL	Makario Stadium	1 – 1
1994-95		20-05-1995	APOEL	Makario Stadium	3 – 3
1995-96		06-01-1996	Omonia	Makario Stadium	2 – 4
1995-96		05-05-1996	APOEL	Makario Stadium	1 – 1
1996-97	11th Fixture		APOEL	Makario Stadium	2 – 2
1996-97	23rd Fixture	12-04-1997	Omonia	Makario Stadium	1 – 0
1997-98	10th Fixture	29-11-1997	Omonia	Makario Stadium	1 – 1
1997-98	22nd Fixture	04-04-1998	APOEL	Makario Stadium	0 – 0
1998-99	10th Fixture	28-11-1998	APOEL	Makario Stadium	1 – 2
1998-99	22nd Fixture	20-03-1999	Omonia	Makario Stadium	1 – 0
1999-00	12th Fixture	18-12-1999	APOEL	GSP Stadium	3 – 3
1999-00	24th Fixture	15-04-2000	Omonia	GSP Stadium	3 – 2
2000-01	8th Fixture	18-11-2000	APOEL	GSP Stadium	1 – 0
2000-01	20th Fixture	24-02-2001	Omonia	GSP Stadium	3 – 2
2001-02	3rd Fixture	29-09-2001	APOEL	GSP Stadium	3 – 0
2001-02	15th Fixture	02-02-2002	Omonia	GSP Stadium	2 – 1
2002-03	13th Fixture	07-12-2002	APOEL	GSP Stadium	0 – 0
2002-03	25th Fixture	04-05-2003	Omonia	GSP Stadium	3 – 4
2003-04	13th Fixture	0-12-2003	Omonia	GSP Stadium	0 – 1
2003-04	25th Fixture	18-04-2004	APOEL	GSP Stadium	1 – 2
2004-05	5th Fixture	23-10-2004	APOEL	GSP Stadium	3 – 1
2004-05	18th Fixture	19-02-2005	Omonia	GSP Stadium	1 – 1
2005-06	10th Fixture	12-11-2005	APOEL	GSP Stadium	2 – 1
2005-06	23rd Fixture	08-04-2006	Omonia	GSP Stadium	1 – 0
2006-07	1st Fixture	13-08-2006	Omonia	GSP Stadium	1 – 2
2006-07	14th Fixture	16-12-2006	APOEL	GSP Stadium	2 – 2
2007-08	12th Fixture	08-12-2007	APOEL	GSP Stadium	1 – 0
2007-08	25th Fixture	15-03-2008	Omonia	GSP Stadium	2 – 1
2007-08	27th Fixture	29-03-2008	Omonia	GSP Stadium	1 – 2
2007-08	31st Fixture	03-05-2008	APOEL	GSP Stadium	2 – 2
2008-09	5th Fixture	20-10-2008	APOEL	GSP Stadium	3 – 2
2008-09	18th Fixture	17-01-2009	Omonia	GSP Stadium	0 – 1
2008-09	28th Fixture	06-04-2009	Omonia	GSP Stadium	1 – 2
2008-09	32nd Fixture	09-05-2009	APOEL	GSP Stadium	Nihilism^{1}
2009–10	13th Fixture	13-12-2009	Omonia	GSP Stadium	1 – 1
2009–10	26th Fixture	21-03-2010	APOEL	GSP Stadium	1 – 2
2009–10	27th Fixture	28-03-2010	APOEL	GSP Stadium	0 – 1
2009–10	31st Fixture	02-05-2010	Omonia	GSP Stadium	1 – 0
2010–11	5th Fixture	03-10-2010	APOEL	GSP Stadium	3 – 0
2010–11	18th Fixture	22-01-2011	Omonia	GSP Stadium	0 – 1
2010–11	28th Fixture	10-04-2011	APOEL	GSP Stadium	2 – 0
2010–11	32nd Fixture	11-05-2011	Omonia	GSP Stadium	1 – 0
2011–12	13th Fixture	11-12-2011	Omonia	GSP Stadium	1 – 3
2011–12	26th Fixture	23-03-2012	APOEL	GSP Stadium	0 – 0
2011–12	27th Fixture	31-03-2012	Omonia	GSP Stadium	1 – 2
2011–12	31st Fixture	05-05-2012	APOEL	GSP Stadium	1 – 2
2012–13	5th Fixture	07-10-2012	Omonia	GSP Stadium	0 – 0
2012–13	18th Fixture	19-01-2013	APOEL	GSP Stadium	1 – 1
2012–13	27th Fixture	06-04-2013	Omonia	GSP Stadium	3 – 0
2012–13	31st Fixture	21-05-2013	APOEL	GSP Stadium	4 – 3
2013–14	13th Fixture	16-12-2013	APOEL	GSP Stadium	2 – 0
2013–14	26th Fixture	19-03-2014	Omonia	GSP Stadium	0 – 0
2013–14	29th Fixture	05-04-2014	Omonia	GSP Stadium	0 – 0
2013–14	34th Fixture	07-05-2014	APOEL	GSP Stadium	2 – 1
2014–15	11th Fixture	30-11-2014	APOEL	GSP Stadium	1 – 0
2014–15	22nd Fixture	28-02-2015	Omonia	GSP Stadium	1 – 1
2014–15	24th Fixture	14-03-2015	Omonia	GSP Stadium	1 – 1
2014–15	29th Fixture	02-05-2015	APOEL	GSP Stadium	3 – 2
2015–16	10th Fixture	09-11-2015	Omonia	GSP Stadium	2 – 2
2015–16	23rd Fixture	13-02-2016	APOEL	GSP Stadium	2 – 0
2015–16	28th Fixture	12-03-2016	APOEL	GSP Stadium	2 – 1
2015–16	33rd Fixture	23-04-2016	Omonia	GSP Stadium	0 – 2
2016–17	13th Fixture	03-12-2016	Omonia	GSP Stadium	1 – 4
2016–17	26th Fixture	04-03-2017	APOEL	GSP Stadium	2 – 1
2016–17	30th Fixture	09-04-2017	APOEL	GSP Stadium	1 – 0
2016–17	35th Fixture	13-05-2017	Omonia	GSP Stadium	1 – 3
2017–18	12th Fixture	17-11-2017	Omonia	GSP Stadium	1 – 3
2017–18	25th Fixture	17-02-2018	APOEL	GSP Stadium	2 – 1
2017–18	27th Fixture	04-03-2018	Omonia	GSP Stadium	0 – 2
2017–18	32nd Fixture	14-04-2018	APOEL	GSP Stadium	4 – 1
2018–19	2nd Fixture	31-10-2018	APOEL	GSP Stadium	2 – 0
2018–19	13th Fixture	16-12-2018	Omonia	GSP Stadium	1 – 2
2018–19	26th Fixture	30-03-2019	APOEL	GSP Stadium	1 – 1
2018–19	31st Fixture	11-05-2019	Omonia	GSP Stadium	1 – 2
2019–20	11th Fixture	02-12-2019	Omonia	GSP Stadium	0 – 0
2019–20	22nd Fixture	02-03-2020	APOEL	GSP Stadium	0 – 0
2020–21	13th Fixture	07-12-2020	APOEL	GSP Stadium	0 – 3
2020–21	26th Fixture	20-02-2021	Omonia	GSP Stadium	1 – 0
2021–22	11th Fixture	26-12-2021	APOEL	GSP Stadium	4 – 2
2021–22	22nd Fixture	25-02-2022	Omonia	GSP Stadium	2 – 4
2022–23	12th Fixture	27-11-2022	APOEL	GSP Stadium	4 – 0
2022–23	25th Fixture	25-02-2023	Omonia	GSP Stadium	0-2
11-03-2023	Omonia		1-1		
01-05-2023	APOEL		0-0		

^{1}In 2008-09, the two teams faced four times but their last match was interrupted due to riots. The Cyprus Football Association judiciary has set aside both groups. This match is not counted in the statistics of the matches of the two teams

== See also ==
- Sports Rivalry
- Local derby
- List of association football rivalries in Europe
