= Andreas Stylianou =

Cypriot footballer

Personal information
- Full name: Andreas Stylianou (Ανδρέας Στυλιανού)
- Date of birth: January 23, 1942 (age 84)
- Place of birth: Kathikas (Paphos), Cyprus
- Position: Striker

Senior career*
Years	Team	Apps	(Gls)
1963–1978	APOEL	261	(126)

International career
1963–1975	Cyprus	37	(2)
- * Club domestic league appearances and goals

Andreas Stylianou (Greek: Ανδρέας Στυλιανού), who was born in 1942, is a former Greek Cypriot football player. Andreas Stylianou joined APOEL in 1963. He won the Cypriot Championship twice (1965, 1973). He also won the Cypriot Cup four times (1968, 1969, 1973, 1976) and the Cyprus FA Shield once, in 1963. Moreover, he was the top scorer of the Cypriot Championship in 1967 and 1971 and he was pronounced the best football player of the year in Cyprus in 1965 and 1974.

Andreas Stylianou was the captain of APOEL during 1973–74, when they participated in the Alpha Ethniki, being the champion of the previous Cypriot Championship, and managed to avoid relegation. APOEL would be the first team in Cyprus that would take part in the Greek Championship two consecutive seasons but, this institution stopped the next year, so the team returned to the Greek Cypriot Championship.

He appeared in 314 matches and scored 148 goals in all competitions with APOEL.
