= 2018–19 Cypriot First Division =

Cyta Championship
- Season: 2018–19
- Champions: APOEL; 28th title
- Relegated: Alki Oroklini; Ermis
- UEFA Champions League: APOEL
- UEFA Europa League: AEK; AEL; Apollon
- Matches: 162
- Goals: 534 (3.3 per match)
- Top goalscorer: Adam Nemec (16 goals)
- Biggest home win: Apollon 5–0 E.N. Paralimni (28 September 2018); Apollon 5–0 Ermis (20 October 2018)
- Biggest away win: Doxa 0–5 AEK Larnaca (21 January 2019)
- Highest scoring: E.N. Paralimni 3–5 Nea Salamina (2 September 2018)
- All statistics correct as of 19 May 2019.

The 2018–19 Cypriot First Division was the 80th season of the Cypriot top-level football league.

== Teams ==
=== Promotion and relegation (pre-season) ===
Aris Limassol and Ethnikos Achna were relegated at the end of the first phase of the 2017–18 season after finishing in the bottom two places of the table. They were joined by Olympiakos Nicosia, who finished at the bottom of the second-phase relegation group.

The relegated teams were replaced by 2017–18 Second Division champions Enosis Neon Paralimni.

=== Stadiums and locations ===
Locations of the 2018–19 Cypriot First Division teams.

Note: Table lists clubs in alphabetical order.

Team	Location	Stadium	Capacity
AEK	Larnaca	AEK Arena, Larnaca	7,400
AEL	Limassol	Tsirio Stadium, Limassol	13,331
Alki	Oroklini, Larnaca	Ammochostos Stadium, Larnaca	5,500
Anorthosis	Famagusta	Antonis Papadopoulos Stadium, Larnaca	10,230
APOEL	Nicosia	GSP Stadium, Nicosia	22,859
Apollon	Limassol	Tsirio Stadium, Limassol	13,331
Doxa	Katokopia, Nicosia	Makario Stadium, Nicosia	16,000
EN Paralimni	Paralimni, Famagusta	Tasos Markou Stadium, Paralimni	5,800
Ermis	Aradippou, Larnaca	Ammochostos Stadium, Larnaca	5,500
Nea Salamina	Famagusta	Ammochostos Stadium, Larnaca	5,500
Omonia	Nicosia	GSP Stadium, Nicosia	22,859
Pafos	Paphos	Stelios Kyriakides Stadium, Paphos	9,394

=== Personnel and kits ===
Note: Flags indicate national team as has been defined under FIFA eligibility rules. Players and Managers may hold more than one non-FIFA nationality.

Team	Head coach	Captain	Kit manufacturer	Shirt sponsor
AEK Larnaca	(Spain) Imanol Idiakez	(Spain) David Català	Puma	A.J.K.
AEL	(Bosnia and Herzegovina) Dušan Kerkez	(Haiti) Kevin Lafrance	Nike	MegaBet Plus
Alki	(Cyprus) Costas Sakkas	(Cyprus) Urko Pardo	Capelli	Alexander College
Anorthosis	(Netherlands) Jurgen Streppel	(Brazil) João Victor	Nike	MegaBet Plus
APOEL	(Italy) Paolo Tramezzani	(Portugal) Nuno Morais	Nike	Pari-Match
Apollon	(Cyprus) Sofronis Avgousti	(Cyprus) Giorgos Vasiliou	Puma	Stoiximan
Doxa Katokopias	(Cyprus) Loukas Hadjiloukas	(Romania) Bogdan Mitrea	Nike	Victory Ammunition
EN Paralimni	(Cyprus) Giorgos Kosma	(Cameroon) Eyong Enoh	Macron	Paralimni Marina
Ermis Aradippou	(Cyprus) Demetris Daskalakis	(Ukraine) Yaroslav Martynyuk	Joma	Cablenet
Nea Salamina	(Cyprus) Savvas Poursaitidis	(Cyprus) Constantinos Mintikkis	Zeus	Vitex
Omonia	(Greece) Yannis Anastasiou	(Cyprus) Demetris Christofi	Puma	Fonbet
Pafos FC	(Croatia) Željko Kopić	(Czech Republic) Zdeněk Folprecht	Jako	Korantina Homes

== Regular season ==
=== League table ===
Pos	Team	Pld	W	D	L	GF	GA	GD	Pts	Qualification or relegation
1	APOEL	22	15	4	3	45	20	+25	49	Qualification for the Championship round
2	Apollon Limassol	22	14	5	3	50	17	+33	47	Qualification for the Championship round
3	AEL Limassol	22	14	3	5	35	25	+10	45	Qualification for the Championship round
4	AEK Larnaca	22	11	6	5	37	16	+21	39	Qualification for the Championship round
5	Omonia	22	9	4	9	25	24	+1	31 (Note: Head to head record: Omonia 3–1 Nea Salamis, Nea Salamis 1–0 Omonia.)	Qualification for the Championship round
6	Nea Salamis Famagusta	22	9	4	9	28	30	−2	31	Qualification for the Championship round
7	Anorthosis Famagusta (Note: Anorthosis were deducted six points for use of unregistered player on a game against Apollon on 2 February 2019.)	22	9	7	6	27	26	+1	28	Qualification for the Relegation round
8	Pafos FC (Note: Pafos FC were deducted six points for use of unregistered player on a game against AEK Larnaca on 2 January 2019.)	22	7	6	9	24	36	−12	21	Qualification for the Relegation round
9	Doxa Katokopias	22	5	5	12	28	39	−11	20	Qualification for the Relegation round
10	Enosis Neon Paralimni	22	4	5	13	17	38	−21	17 (Note: Head to head record: Paralimni 2–0 Alki, Alki 1–2 Paralimni.)	Qualification for the Relegation round
11	Alki Oroklini	22	4	5	13	19	43	−24	17	Qualification for the Relegation round
12	Ermis Aradippou	22	2	4	16	19	40	−21	10	Qualification for the Relegation round

Source: Cyprus Football Association, Soccerway
Rules for classification: 1) Points; 2) Head-to-head points; 3) Head-to-head goal difference; 4) Head-to-head goals scored; 5) Head-to-head away goals scored (only if two teams); 6) Goal difference; 7) Goals scored; 8) Play-off (only if deciding championship round, relegation round or relegation).

=== Results ===
Home \ Away	AEK	AEL	ALK	ANO	APOE	APOL	DOX	ENP	ERM	NSL	OMO	PAF
AEK Larnaca	—	0–1	2–0	3–0	1–0	0–0	3–0	3–0	2–2	0–1	1–0	3–0 (Note: Original AEK-PAF result of 1-1 was overturned upon appeal. Η απόφαση του Αθλητικού Δικαστή για την ένσταση της ΑΕΚ Λάρνακας (πλήρες σκεπτικό) (in Greek). Cyprus Football Association. 16 January 2019.)
AEL Limassol	0–0	—	5–1	0–3	0–1	0–3	2–0	4–1	3–2	3–2	2–1	1–0
Alki Oroklini	0–3	1–3	—	0–0	2–4	1–3	2–1	1–2	0–2	2–0	0–2	3–3
Anorthosis Famagusta	1–2	0–1	0–0	—	2–3	0–3 (Note: Original ANO-APOL result of 0-1 was overturned upon appeal.)	3–1	2–0	2–1	1–0	0–0	2–2
APOEL	2–2	0–0	0–0	4–0	—	5–1	2–5	3–0	2–0	4–0	2–0	1–2
Apollon Limassol	3–3	0–0	3–0	1–2	1–2	—	2–0	5–0	5–0	1–0	2–1	5–1
Doxa Katokopias	0–5	3–4	4–0	0–1	1–2	1–1	—	2–1	1–1	1–1	1–2	3–2
Enosis Neon Paralimni	2–1	1–2	2–0	1–1	0–2	0–2	0–1	—	2–0	3–5	1–1	1–1
Ermis Aradippou	1–2	0–1	2–4	2–3	0–1	0–3	1–1	0–0	—	0–1	0–2	3–0
Nea Salamis Famagusta	1–1	4–1	1–1	0–2	2–3	0–3	1–0	0–0	1–0	—	1–0	3–0
Omonia Nicosia	1–0	2–0	1–0	1–1	1–2	0–2	2–2	1–0	2–1	3–1	—	2–4
Pafos FC	1–0	0–2	0–1	1–1	0–0	1–1	1–0	1–0	2–1	1–3	1–0	—

Source: Cyprus Football Association
Legend: Blue = home team win; Yellow = draw; Red = away team win.
For upcoming matches, an "a" indicates there is an article about the rivalry between the two participants.

=== Positions by Round ===
The table lists the positions of teams after each week of matches. In order to preserve chronological progress, any postponed matches are not included in the round at which they were originally scheduled, but added to the full round they were played immediately afterwards. For example, if a match is scheduled for matchday 13, but then postponed and played between days 16 and 17, it will be added to the standings for day 16.

Team ╲ Round	1	2	3	4	5	6	7	8	9	10	11	12	13	14	15	16	17	18	19	20	21	22
APOEL	5	8	2	5	4	5	3	2	2	3	2	2	2	1	1	1	1	1	1	1	2	1
Apollon	6	9	7	2	2	2	2	3	3	1	3	3	3	3	3	3	2	2	3	3	1	2
AEL Limassol	1	1	1	1	1	1	1	1	1	2	1	1	1	2	2	2	3	3	2	2	3	3
AEK Larnaca	4	7	9	7	6	3	4	5	4	4	4	4	4	4	4	5	4	4	4	4	4	4
Omonia	2	5	3	4	7	8	8	8	7	7	8	7	7	7	7	7	7	7	7	7	6	5
Nea Salamis	8	3	4	8	5	4	5	4	5	5	5	6	6	6	6	4	6	5	6	6	5	6
Anorthosis	3	2	5	6	8	7	7	7	6	6	6	5	5	5	5	6	5	6	5	5	7	7
Pafos	9	6	10	11	11	12	9	10	11	9	10	9	9	9	11	12	12	11	11	9	9	8
Doxa Katokopias	10	12	8	3	3	6	6	6	8	8	7	8	8	8	8	8	8	8	8	8	8	9
EN Paralimni	7	10	11	9	10	9	10	9	9	11	9	10	10	11	10	10	10	10	9	10	10	10
Alki Oroklini	11	11	12	12	12	10	11	11	12	12	12	12	11	10	9	9	9	9	10	11	11	11
Ermis	12	4	6	10	9	11	12	12	10	10	11	11	12	12	12	11	11	12	12	12	12	12

Qualification to Championship round
Qualification to Relegation round

Updated to match(es) played on 24 February 2019. Source:

== Championship round ==
=== Championship round table ===
Pos	Team	Pld	W	D	L	GF	GA	GD	Pts	Qualification
1	APOEL (C)	32	21	7	4	66	25	+41	70	Qualification for the Champions League second qualifying round
2	AEK Larnaca	32	18	8	6	51	23	+28	62	Qualification for the Europa League first qualifying round
3	Apollon Limassol	32	17	7	8	64	32	+32	58	Qualification for the Europa League first qualifying round
4	AEL Limassol	32	17	4	11	49	47	+2	55	Qualification for the Europa League second qualifying round (Note: AEL Limassol qualified for the Europa League second qualifying round by winning the 2018–19 Cypriot Cup.)
5	Nea Salamis Famagusta	32	12	8	12	41	47	−6	44	
6	Omonia	32	10	6	16	36	45	−9	36	

Updated to match(es) played on 20 May 2019. Source: CFA (in Greek)
Rules for classification: 1) Points; 2) Head-to-head points; 3) Head-to-head goal difference; 4) Head-to-head goals scored; 5) Head-to-head away goals scored (only if two teams); 6) Goal difference; 7) Goals scored; 8) Play-off (only if deciding champion or UEFA competitions).
(C) Champions

=== Results ===
Home \ Away	AEK	AEL	APOE	APOL	NSF	OMO
AEK Larnaca	—	1–0	1–0	2–1	1–1	2–1
AEL Limassol	2–3	—	0–3	0–3	5–2	3–2
APOEL	0–0	4–0	—	3–0	4–0	1–1
Apollon Limassol	1–2	1–1	1–3	—	1–1	3–1
Nea Salamis Famagusta	1–0	0–2	1–1	2–1	—	5–2
Omonia Nicosia	0–2	3–1	1–2	0–2	0–0	—

Updated to match(es) played on 20 May 2019. Source: Cyprus Football Association
Legend: Blue = home team win; Yellow = draw; Red = away team win.
For upcoming matches, an "a" indicates there is an article about the rivalry between the two participants.

=== Positions by Round ===
The table lists the positions of teams after each week of matches.

Team ╲ Round	23	24	25	26	27	28	29	30	31	32
APOEL	1	2	1	1	1	1	1	1	1	1
AEK Larnaca	4	4	4	4	3	3	3	3	2	2
Apollon	2	1	2	2	2	2	2	2	3	3
AEL Limassol	3	3	3	3	4	4	4	4	4	4
Nea Salamis	5	5	5	6	5	5	5	5	5	5
Omonia	6	6	6	5	6	6	6	6	6	6

Qualification to Champions League first qualifying round
Qualification to Europa League first qualifying round

== Relegation round ==
=== Relegation round table ===
Pos	Team	Pld	W	D	L	GF	GA	GD	Pts	Relegation
7	Anorthosis Famagusta (Note: Anorthosis were deducted six points for use of unregistered player on a game against Apollon on 2 February 2019.)	32	12	11	9	42	41	+1	41	
8	Pafos FC (Note: Pafos FC were deducted six points for use of unregistered player on a game against AEK Larnaca on 2 January 2019.)	32	12	8	12	39	50	−11	38	
9	Doxa Katokopias	32	9	8	15	47	50	−3	35	
10	Enosis Neon Paralimni	32	9	8	15	35	51	−16	35	
11	Alki Oroklini (R)	32	10	5	17	35	58	−23	35	Relegation to the Cypriot Second Division
12	Ermis Aradippou (R)	32	3	4	25	29	65	−36	13	Relegation to the Cypriot Second Division

Source: CFA
Rules for classification: 1) Points; 2) Head-to-head points; 3) Head-to-head goal difference; 4) Head-to-head goals scored; 5) Head-to-head away goals scored (only if two teams); 6) Goal difference; 7) Goals scored; 8) Play-off (only if deciding champion or UEFA competitions).
(R) Relegated

=== Results ===
Home \ Away	ALK	ANO	DOX	ENP	ERM	PAF
Alki Oroklini	—	1–0	1–4	2–0	2–1	2–3
Anorthosis Famagusta	3–0	—	0–3	1–1	3–2	1–1
Doxa Katokopias	0–1	3–3	—	2–2	1–0	0–0
Enosis Neon Paralimni	3–2	2–2	1–0	—	4–1	1–2
Ermis Aradippou	1–2	2–1	0–4	1–2	—	1–2
Pafos FC	0–3	0–1	3–2	0–2	4–1	—

Updated to match(es) played on 20 May 2019. Source: Cyprus Football Association
Legend: Blue = home team win; Yellow = draw; Red = away team win.
For upcoming matches, an "a" indicates there is an article about the rivalry between the two participants.

=== Positions by Round ===
The table lists the positions of teams after each week of matches.

Team ╲ Round	23	24	25	26	27	28	29	30	31	32
Anorthosis	7	7	7	7	7	7	7	7	7	7
Pafos	8	9	11	9	8	8	8	8	9	8
Doxa Katokopias	9	10	8	8	9	9	9	10	10	9
EN Paralimni	10	11	9	10	11	11	11	11	11	10
Alki Oroklini	11	8	10	11	10	10	10	9	9	11
Ermis	12	12	12	12	12	12	12	12	12	12

Relegation to Cypriot Second Division

== Season statistics ==
=== Top scorers ===
As of 20 May 2019.

Rank	Player	Club	Goals
1	(Slovakia) Adam Nemec	Pafos	16
2	(North Macedonia) Ivan Trichkovski	AEK Larnaca	15
2	(Spain) Rubén Jurado	AEL	15
4	(Portugal) Nuno Morais	APOEL	13
5	(Finland) Berat Sadik	Doxa	12
6	(Argentina) Facundo Pereyra	Apollon	11
6	(Nigeria) Kingsley Onuegbu	Nea Salamina	11
8	(Slovakia) Michal Ďuriš	Anorthosis	10
8	(Brazil) Ivan Carlos França Coelho	Alki Oroklini	10
8	(Brazil) Thiago	Nea Salamina	10
8	(Argentina) Emilio Zelaya	Apollon	10

=== Hat-tricks ===
#	Player	For	Against	Result	Date
1.	(Finland) Berat Sadik^{4}	Doxa	APOEL	5–2	23 September 2018
2.	(North Macedonia) Ivan Trichkovski	AEK Larnaca	Doxa	5–0	21 January 2019
2.	(Romania) Paul Batin	Doxa	Ermis	4–0	31 March 2019

- ^{4} Player scored 4 goals.

== Awards ==
=== Individual awards ===
Award	Player	Club
Player of the Year	(Jordan) Musa Al-Taamari	APOEL
Cypriot Player of the Year	(Cyprus) Nicolas Ioannou	APOEL
Foreign Player of the Year	(Jordan) Musa Al-Taamari	APOEL
Coach of the Year	(Cyprus) Savvas Poursaitides	Nea Salamis
Goalkeeper of the Year	(Slovakia) Robert Veselovský	Nea Salamis
Best Goal	(Spain) Jordi Gómez	Omonia
Golden Glove	(Spain) Tono Ramírez	AEK Larnaca
Top scorer	(Slovakia) Adam Nemec	Pafos

Team of the Year
Goalkeeper	(Slovakia) Robert Veselovsky (Nea Salamina)			
Defenders	(Portugal) João Pedro (Apollon)	(Haiti) Kevin Lafrance (AEL)	(Cyprus) Nicolas Ioannou (APOEL)	(Cyprus) Valentin Roberge (Apollon)
Midfielders	(Cyprus) Chambos Kyriakou (Apollon)	(Brazil) Lucas Souza (APOEL)	(Cyprus) Matija Spoljaric (Alki Oroklini)	
Forwards	(Jordan) Musa Al-Taamari (APOEL)	(Nigeria) Kingsley Onuegbu (Nea Salamina)	(North Macedonia) Ivan Trichkovski (AEK)	

== Attendances ==
#	Football club	Average attendance
1	APOEL	4,414
2	Omonoia	4,143
3	Apollon FC	2,514
4	Anorthosis Famagusta	2,291
5	AEK Larnaca	2,060
6	AEL Limassol	1,563
7	Nea Salamis Famagusta	988
8	Pafos FC	676
9	Enosis Neon Paralimni	647
10	Alki Oroklini	425
11	Ermis Aradippou	412
12	Doxa Katokopias	306
