= Andreas Melanarkitis =

Cypriot footballer (born 1975)

Personal information
- Full name: Andreas Melanarkitis
- Date of birth: 15 March 1975 (age 51)
- Place of birth: Limassol, Cyprus
- Height: 1.79 m (5 ft 10 1/2 in)
- Position: Central defender

Senior career*
Years	Team	Apps	(Gls)
1995–1997	Anorthosis Famagusta	26	(0)
1997–1998	Nea Salamina	18	(0)
1998–1999	Olympiakos Nicosia	22	(0)
1999–2001	Anorthosis Famagusta	29	(2)
2001–2002	Enosis Neon Paralimni	24	(2)
2002–2004	Olympiakos Nicosia	45	(8)
2004	PAS Giannina	11	(0)
2004	Lamia	17	(1)
2005–2006	APOP Kinyras Peyias	15	(0)
2006–2007	Aris Limassol	4	(0)
2007–2008	Anagennisi Germasogeias		
Total		199	(12)

International career^{‡}
2002	Cyprus	2	(0)
- * Club domestic league appearances and goals as of 28 May 2008 ‡ National team caps and goals as of 28 May 2008

Andreas Melanarkitis (Greek: Aντρέας Μελαναρκίτης; born 15 March 1975) is a former international Cypriot football defender.

He started his career in 1995 from Anorthosis Famagusta. He played in many teams such as Nea Salamina, Olympiakos Nicosia, Enosis Neon Paralimni, PAS Giannina, Lamia, APOP Kinyras Peyias and Aris Limassol
