= Stavros Foukaris =

Cypriot footballer (born 1975)

Personal information
- Full name: Stavros Foukaris
- Date of birth: April 15, 1975 (age 51)
- Place of birth: Famagusta, Cyprus
- Position: Defender

Senior career*
Years	Team	Apps	(Gls)
1992–2002	Anorthosis Famagusta	143	(2)
2002–2003	→ Nea Salamina (loan)	19	(0)
1996–2002	Anorthosis Famagusta	17	(2)
Total		179	(2)

International career
1998–2003	Cyprus	3	(0)
- * Club domestic league appearances and goals

Stavros Foukaris (Greek: Σταύρος Φουκαρής; born April 15, 1975) is a Cypriot former international football defender.

He started and ended his career with Anorthosis Famagusta. In between, he played on loan at Nea Salamina.
