= Charalambos Andreou =

Cypriot footballer (born 1967)

Pambis Andreou
Personal information
- Full name: Charalambos Andreou
- Date of birth: 16 June 1967 (age 59)
- Place of birth: Famagusta, Cyprus
- Height: 1.75 m (5 ft 9 in)
- Positions: Striker; attacking midfielder

Senior career*
Years	Team	Apps	(Gls)
1987–1997	Nea Salamis Famagusta FC	197	(97)
1997–1999	Anorthosis Famagusta	43	(19)
1999–2003	Nea Salamis Famagusta FC	74	(28)
Total		314	(144)

International career
1992–1997	Cyprus	21	(2)
- * Club domestic league appearances and goals

Charalambos Andreou (Greek: Χαράλαμπος Ανδρέου; born 16 June 1967) is a Cypriot former international football striker.

He started and ended his career in Nea Salamis Famagusta FC. He had left only for two seasons to play for Anorthosis Famagusta.

All-time top scorer of Nea Salamina with more than 200 goals in all competitions
