= 1957–58 Cypriot First Division =

Cypriot First Division
- Season: 1957–58

The 1957–58 Cypriot First Division was the 21st season of the Cypriot top-level football league.

== Overview ==
It was contested by 10 teams, and Anorthosis Famagusta FC won the championship. Also Apollon Limassol made their debut as a team.

== League standings ==
Pos	Team	Pld	W	D	L	GF	GA	GD	Pts
1	Anorthosis Famagusta FC (C)	17	12	3	2	55	22	+33	27
2	Pezoporikos Larnaca	16	8	5	3	35	22	+13	21
3	EPA Larnaca FC	18	9	2	7	31	34	−3	20
4	AEL Limassol	18	7	5	6	30	25	+5	19
5	AC Omonia	16	6	4	6	20	21	−1	16
6	APOEL F.C.	16	5	5	6	20	23	−3	15
7	Nea Salamis FC	18	6	3	9	30	40	−10	15
8	Aris Limassol F.C.	17	5	5	7	22	32	−10	15
9	Apollon Limassol	17	2	9	6	28	38	−10	13
10	Olympiakos Nicosia	17	1	7	9	21	35	−14	9

(C) Champions

== Results ==
Home \ Away	AEL	ANR	APN	APL	ARS	EPA	NSL	OLY	OMO	POL
AEL		2–1	0–0	1–1	6–0	2–1	1–2	3–0	0–2	0–0
Anorthosis	2–2		4–1	8–2	4–0	4–1	2–0	3–3	3–0	4–2
APOEL	3–2	–		2–2	–	1–0	1–3	3–1	0–1	3–0
Apollon	1–2	4–4	2–1		1–1	3–3	5–2	0–0	–	1–1
Aris	1–2	0–2	2–3	2–2		4–2	3–2	2–2	2–0	3–2
EPA	1–0	1–3	2–5	2–0	2–0		2–1	4–1	2–0	0–5
Nea Salamis	2–1	1–3	3–0	4–2	0–1	3–4		3–1	1–5	1–1
Olympiakos	2–3	3–3	1–2	1–1	1–1	0–1	6–0		1–3	–
Omonia	2–2	0–3	1–1	2–0	2–1	0–1	1–1	1–1		–
Pezoporikos	4–1	3–2	3–0	2–1	2–1	2–2	1–1	5–2	2–0	

Legend: Blue = home team win; Yellow = draw; Red = away team win.
