= 1959–60 Cypriot First Division =

Cypriot First Division
- Season: 1959–60

The 1959–60 Cypriot First Division was the 22nd season of the Cypriot top-level football league.

== Overview ==
It was contested by 11 teams, and Anorthosis Famagusta FC won the championship.

== League standings ==
| Pos | Team | Pld | W | D | L | GF | GA | GD | Pts |
|---|---|---|---|---|---|---|---|---|---|
| 1 | Anorthosis Famagusta FC (C) | 20 | 13 | 4 | 3 | 53 | 23 | +30 | 30 |
| 2 | AC Omonia | 20 | 13 | 3 | 4 | 40 | 20 | +20 | 29 |
| 3 | APOEL F.C. | 20 | 8 | 7 | 5 | 35 | 22 | +13 | 23 |
| 4 | Pezoporikos Larnaca | 20 | 9 | 4 | 7 | 40 | 35 | +5 | 22 |
| 5 | AEL Limassol | 20 | 6 | 10 | 4 | 36 | 36 | 0 | 22 |
| 6 | Nea Salamis FC | 20 | 8 | 4 | 8 | 29 | 27 | +2 | 20 |
| 7 | Apollon Limassol | 20 | 5 | 8 | 7 | 39 | 42 | −3 | 18 |
| 8 | Olympiakos Nicosia | 20 | 5 | 6 | 9 | 26 | 35 | −9 | 16 |
| 9 | EPA Larnaca FC | 20 | 5 | 4 | 11 | 31 | 50 | −19 | 14 |
| 10 | Orfeas Nicosia | 20 | 5 | 4 | 11 | 17 | 32 | −15 | 14 |
| 11 | Aris Limassol F.C. | 20 | 4 | 4 | 12 | 27 | 51 | −24 | 12 |

(C) Champions

== Results ==
| Home \ Away | AEL | ANR | APN | APL | ARS | EPA | NSL | OLY | OMO | ORF | POL |
|---|---|---|---|---|---|---|---|---|---|---|---|
| AEL | | 0–0 | 2–2 | 3–3 | 0–0 | 3–1 | 2–4 | 3–1 | 0–5 | 5–2 | 3–3 |
| Anorthosis | 5–2 | | 0–0 | 5–1 | 5–1 | 3–1 | 3–1 | 6–0 | 0–1 | 2–1 | 0–0 |
| APOEL | 2–2 | 1–1 | | 5–3 | 7–0 | 4–1 | 1–0 | 0–2 | 0–1 | 2–0 | 1–1 |
| Apollon | 2–2 | 2–5 | 0–1 | | 2–2 | 8–0 | 2–0 | 3–3 | 0–1 | 0–0 | 5–3 |
| Aris | 1–2 | 1–5 | 0–1 | 1–2 | | 2–5 | 1–2 | 3–1 | 2–1 | 3–0 | 3–1 |
| EPA | 1–3 | 1–3 | 3–2 | 0–8 | 5–2 | | 1–3 | 2–1 | 2–3 | 1–1 | 2–1 |
| Nea Salamis | 1–1 | 1–2 | 0–0 | 1–0 | 3–1 | 4–2 | | 1–0 | 0–2 | 0–1 | 0–1 |
| Olympiakos | 2–2 | 1–2 | 3–1 | 0–0 | 1–1 | 2–1 | 1–1 | | 1–1 | 0–1 | 4–0 |
| Omonia | 1–3 | 5–2 | 2–1 | 4–1 | 4–1 | 4–1 | 2–2 | 1–0 | | 1–0 | 1–0 |
| Orfeas | 0–1 | 2–1 | 0–3 | 1–1 | 2–0 | 2–1 | 2–4 | 0–2 | 0–0 | | 1–2 |
| Pezoporikos | 1–0 | 1–3 | 1–1 | 5–2 | 5–2 | 1–3 | 2–1 | 6–1 | 3–1 | 3–1 | |

Legend: Blue = home team win; Yellow = draw; Red = away team win.
