= 1956–57 Cypriot First Division =

Cypriot First Division
- Season: 1956–57

The 1956–57 Cypriot First Division was the 20th season of the Cypriot top-level football league. This year no relegation took place after an agreement between the clubs.

== Overview ==
It was contested by 9 teams, and Anorthosis Famagusta FC won the championship. There was no relegation this season, because the league was expanded to 10 teams in the next season.

== League standings ==
Pos	Team	Pld	W	D	L	GF	GA	GD	Pts
1	Anorthosis Famagusta FC (C)	16	13	3	0	51	13	+38	29
2	Pezoporikos Larnaca	16	8	5	3	40	24	+16	21
3	AC Omonia	16	8	5	3	34	27	+7	21
4	Aris Limassol F.C.	16	6	3	7	30	29	+1	15
5	Nea Salamis FC	16	6	2	8	24	25	−1	14
6	AEL Limassol	16	4	4	8	18	32	−14	12
7	Olympiakos Nicosia	16	5	2	9	24	50	−26	12
8	EPA Larnaca FC	16	2	6	8	27	37	−10	10
9	APOEL F.C.	16	2	6	8	20	31	−11	10

(C) Champions

== Results ==
Home \ Away	AEL	ANR	APN	ARS	EPA	NSL	OLY	OMO	POL
AEL		0–2	1–1	2–0	5–3	1–2	1–0	1–1	1–3
Anorthosis	4–0		1–0	4–0	8–1	3–1	7–1	2–1	2–0
APOEL	0–1	1–3		2–2	1–1	1–1	2–2	1–2	3–2
Aris	2–2	1–3	4–0		1–0	1–0	4–1	6–1	4–4
EPA	2–2	2–2	1–1	0–2		2–1	7–0	2–4	0–1
Nea Salamis	2–0	0–1	2–1	1–0	2–2		5–1	3–2	1–2
Olympiakos	3–1	1–5	1–3	2–1	3–1	2–1		1–2	3–2
Omonia	3–0	2–2	2–1	5–2	2–1	3–1	2–2		1–1
Pezoporikos	4–1	2–2	5–2	2–0	2–2	3–1	6–1	1–1	

Legend: Blue = home team win; Yellow = draw; Red = away team win.
