= 1974–75 Cypriot First Division =

Cypriot First Division
- Season: 1974–75

The 1974–75 Cypriot First Division was the 36th season of the Cypriot top-level football league.

== Overview ==
It was contested by 14 teams, and AC Omonia won the championship. APOEL did not participate in the Greek championship, even though they were not relegated in the previous season, due to the volatile situation in Cyprus in 1974. They competed in the championship unofficially, but their matches did not count towards the official league table.

== League standings ==
| Pos | Team | Pld | W | D | L | GF | GA | GD | Pts | Qualification |
|---|---|---|---|---|---|---|---|---|---|---|
| 1 | AC Omonia (C) | 26 | 19 | 5 | 2 | 70 | 14 | +56 | 43 | Qualification for European Cup first round |
| 2 | EN Paralimni | 26 | 17 | 5 | 4 | 51 | 11 | +40 | 39 | Qualification for UEFA Cup first round |
| 3 | Olympiakos Nicosia | 26 | 14 | 11 | 1 | 44 | 17 | +27 | 39 | |
| 4 | Alki Larnaca FC | 26 | 16 | 5 | 5 | 57 | 16 | +41 | 37 | |
| 5 | Pezoporikos Larnaca | 26 | 11 | 7 | 8 | 31 | 27 | +4 | 29 | |
| 6 | Anorthosis Famagusta FC | 26 | 8 | 10 | 8 | 39 | 28 | +11 | 26 | Qualification for Cup Winners' Cup first round |
| 7 | Apollon Limassol | 26 | 8 | 10 | 8 | 34 | 31 | +3 | 26 | |
| 8 | EPA Larnaca FC | 26 | 7 | 8 | 11 | 27 | 35 | −8 | 22 | |
| 9 | AEL Limassol | 26 | 7 | 8 | 11 | 31 | 51 | −20 | 22 | |
| 10 | Aris Limassol F.C. | 26 | 6 | 8 | 12 | 27 | 42 | −15 | 20 | |
| 11 | Nea Salamis FC | 26 | 7 | 3 | 16 | 27 | 51 | −24 | 17 | |
| 12 | ASIL Lysi | 26 | 7 | 3 | 16 | 34 | 81 | −47 | 17 | |
| 13 | Digenis Akritas Morphou | 26 | 3 | 8 | 15 | 21 | 56 | −35 | 14 | |
| 14 | Evagoras Paphos | 26 | 2 | 9 | 15 | 17 | 50 | −33 | 13 | |

(C) Champions

== Results ==
| Home \ Away | AEL | ALK | ANR | APL | ARS | ASL | DGN | ENP | EPA | EVA | NSL | OLY | OMO | POL |
|---|---|---|---|---|---|---|---|---|---|---|---|---|---|---|
| AEL | | 1–3 | 2–2 | 1–1 | 1–1 | 5–2 | 0–0 | 1–1 | 2–0 | 1–0 | 2–0 | 0–0 | 0–6 | 0–1 |
| Alki | 1–0 | | 0–0 | 5–1 | 3–0 | 6–1 | 7–0 | 0–1 | 0–0 | 0–0 | 5–0 | 1–1 | 0–2 | 2–0 |
| Anorthosis | 9–1 | 0–3 | | 0–0 | 0–0 | 4–0 | 3–1 | 1–3 | 1–0 | 4–0 | 0–1 | 0–2 | 1–4 | 2–2 |
| Apollon | 0–0 | 0–0 | 2–0 | | 1–1 | 4–1 | 1–1 | 0–0 | 1–1 | 1–2 | 6–0 | 0–1 | 2–1 | 3–0 |
| Aris | 3–0 | 1–5 | 1–3 | 0–0 | | 0–4 | 3–0 | 1–0 | 5–1 | 2–0 | 1–0 | 1–1 | 1–1 | 0–2 |
| ASIL | 1–3 | 1–6 | 1–7 | 0–5 | 2–1 | | 1–1 | 1–2 | 1–3 | 1–1 | 2–1 | 1–4 | 1–4 | 3–2 |
| Digenis | 1–1 | 0–2 | 0–1 | 0–1 | 2–1 | 1–3 | | 0–4 | 0–1 | 4–0 | 1–1 | 0–4 | 1–4 | 1–1 |
| ENP | 4–0 | 1–0 | 0–0 | 2–0 | 2–0 | 2–0 | 5–0 | | 4–1 | 8–0 | 3–0 | 2–0 | 0–1 | 2–0 |
| EPA | 2–0 | 1–2 | 0–0 | 1–1 | 2–1 | 2–2 | 4–1 | 0–2 | | 1–1 | 1–2 | 0–0 | 0–3 | 0–1 |
| Evagoras | 0–1 | 0–2 | 0–0 | 2–0 | 1–1 | 0–1 | 0–0 | 2–3 | 2–3 | | 0–0 | 3–3 | 0–2 | 1–2 |
| Nea Salamis | 4–5 | 0–1 | 1–1 | 3–2 | 5–2 | 2–3 | 0–3 | 2–0 | 0–2 | 2–0 | | 0–1 | 1–0 | 0–2 |
| Olympiakos | 4–2 | 3–0 | 3–0 | 1–0 | 4–0 | 2–1 | 1–1 | 0–0 | 1–0 | 1–1 | 2–1 | | 2–2 | 2–0 |
| Omonia | 2–1 | 2–0 | 1–0 | 7–0 | 2–0 | 8–0 | 4–1 | 1–0 | 1–1 | 4–1 | 4–0 | 1–1 | | 3–0 |
| Pezoporikos | 3–1 | 0–3 | 0–0 | 1–2 | 0–0 | 5–0 | 3–1 | 0–0 | 1–0 | 3–0 | 2–1 | 0–0 | 0–0 | |

Legend: Blue = home team win; Yellow = draw; Red = away team win.
