= 1962–63 Cypriot First Division =

National football league

Cypriot First Division
- Season: 1962–63

The 1962–63 Cypriot First Division was the 25th season of the Cypriot top-level football league.

== Overview ==
It was contested by 12 teams, and Anorthosis Famagusta FC won the championship.

== League standings ==
Pos	Team	Pld	W	D	L	GF	GA	GD	Pts	Qualification or relegation
1	Anorthosis Famagusta FC (C)	22	17	3	2	64	20	+44	37	Qualification for European Cup preliminary round
2	APOEL F.C.	22	13	6	3	49	26	+23	32	Qualification for Cup Winners' Cup first round
3	AC Omonia	22	10	7	5	39	24	+15	27	
4	Nea Salamis FC	22	9	8	5	56	43	+13	26	
5	Olympiakos Nicosia	22	12	2	8	47	40	+7	26	
6	Pezoporikos Larnaca	22	8	6	8	46	51	−5	22	
7	EPA Larnaca FC	22	8	4	10	32	47	−15	20	
8	Aris Limassol F.C.	22	8	4	10	40	59	−19	20	
9	Apollon Limassol	22	5	6	11	45	57	−12	16	
10	AEL Limassol	22	4	5	13	35	42	−7	13	
11	Orfeas Nicosia (Note: 1 point deducted.) (R)	22	5	3	14	26	45	−19	12	Qualification for relegation play-offs
12	Alki Larnaca FC (O)	22	5	2	15	33	58	−25	12	Qualification for relegation play-offs

(C) Champions; (O) Play-off winners; (R) Relegated

== Results ==
Home \ Away	AEL	ALK	ANR	APN	APL	ARS	EPA	NSL	OLY	OMO	ORF	POL
AEL		1–1	1–2	1–2	1–1	5–1	2–4	2–4	4–1	1–1	3–1	1–4
Alki	3–1		1–2	4–0	2–6	1–2	1–1	2–1	1–3	1–4	3–0	1–4
Anorthosis	1–0	7–2		1–1	3–1	5–1	7–1	5–1	4–3	2–0	5–1	5–0
APOEL	1–0	3–0	0–0		7–1	4–2	1–4	1–1	2–1	3–1	1–0	5–2
Apollon	2–2	2–1	2–3	2–5		7–1	3–1	5–5	3–2	0–2	2–2	1–1
Aris	2–1	3–1	2–1	2–2	3–2		1–0	1–2	3–1	0–1	4–4	3–2
EPA	0–3	1–0	0–3	1–0	4–1	5–1		1–1	1–1	0–5	2–1	1–1
Nea Salamis	2–2	8–3	1–4	0–3	1–1	7–2	3–0		5–1	1–1	4–1	6–3
Olympiakos	3–1	1–0	0–2	0–0	3–1	2–1	4–2	3–0		3–1	2–1	5–3
Omonia	2–1	3–1	1–2	2–2	3–0	1–1	3–0	0–0	2–4		2–0	0–0
Orfeas	1–0	1–2	1–0	0–1	2–1	2–2	1–2	0–1	2–1	1–3		3–2
Pezoporikos	3–2	4–2	0–0	1–5	3–1	3–2	4–1	2–2	1–3	1–1	2–1	

Legend: Blue = home team win; Yellow = draw; Red = away team win.
