= 1963–64 Cypriot First Division =

Cypriot First Division
- Season: 1963–64

The 1963-64 Cypriot First Division championship was abandoned due to civil unrest in Cyprus at that time. Eleven teams participated.

== League standings ==
Pos	Team	Pld	W	D	L	GF	GA	GD	Pts	Qualification
1	AC Omonia	6	6	0	0	13	2	+11	12	
2	APOEL FC	7	5	1	1	18	7	+11	11	
3	Nea Salamis FC	7	4	2	1	16	10	+6	10	
4	Apollon Limassol	8	3	3	2	6	7	−1	9	
5	Anorthosis Famagusta FC	7	3	1	3	7	10	−3	7	Qualification for Cup Winners' Cup first round
6	Olympiakos Nicosia	7	1	4	2	13	12	+1	6	
7	EPA Larnaca FC	7	3	0	4	7	13	−6	6	
8	AEL Limassol	7	2	1	4	11	13	−2	5	
9	Pezoporikos Larnaca	6	1	2	3	10	14	−4	4	
10	Alki Larnaca F.C.	7	1	1	5	13	18	−5	3	
11	Aris Limassol F.C.	7	1	1	5	2	10	−8	3	

== Results ==
Home \ Away	AEL	ALK	ANR	APN	APL	ARS	EPA	NSL	OLY	OMO	POL
AEL		1–0	–	–	–	1–0	–	4–5	3–3	–	–
Alki	–		3–5	–	–	–	1–3	–	1–4	1–4	–
Anorthosis	2–1	–		–	1–0	–	–	2–1	–	–	–
APOEL	–	–	4–1		–	4–0	–	–	–	–	–
Apollon	2–1	–	1–0	0–2		–	–	–	–	–	–
Aris	–	–	–	–	0–0		0–1	–	–	0–3	2–1
EPA	1–0	2–1	–	–	0–1	–		–	–	–	–
Nea Salamis	–	–	2–0	1–1	0–0	–	5–2		–	–	–
Olympiakos	–	2–2	–	–	1–1	3–0	–	–		0–1	–
Omonia	–	–	–	1–0	–	–	2–1	2–0	–		–
Pezoporikos	–	–	1–1	–	–	–	–	–	3–3	0–1*	

Legend: Blue = home team win; Yellow = draw; Red = away team win.
- * OMONIA WON AWAY 0-1 (match abandoned at 46 mins)
