= 1965–66 Cypriot First Division =

Cypriot First Division
- Season: 1965–66

The 1965–66 Cypriot First Division was the 27th season of the Cypriot top-level football league.

== Overview ==
It was contested by 11 teams, and AC Omonia won the championship.

== League standings ==
Pos	Team	Pld	W	D	L	GF	GA	GD	Pts	Qualification
1	AC Omonia (C)	20	13	4	3	42	23	+19	30	Qualification for European Cup first round
2	Olympiakos Nicosia	20	14	1	5	60	30	+30	29	
3	Nea Salamis FC	20	12	4	4	39	21	+18	28	
4	Anorthosis Famagusta FC	20	8	7	5	41	31	+10	23	
5	Pezoporikos Larnaca	20	6	8	6	39	34	+5	20	
6	Apollon Limassol	20	7	4	9	25	32	−7	18	Qualification for Cup Winners' Cup first round
7	APOEL F.C.	20	7	3	10	43	29	+14	17	
8	AEL Limassol (Note: 1 point deducted.)	20	8	2	10	37	45	−8	17	
9	Alki Larnaca FC	20	6	5	9	27	39	−12	17	
10	EPA Larnaca FC	20	6	3	11	20	33	−13	15	
11	Aris Limassol F.C.	20	2	1	17	17	73	−56	5	

(C) Champions

== Results ==
Home \ Away	AEL	ALK	ANR	APN	APL	ARS	EPA	NSL	OLY	OMO	POL
AEL		1–0	3–2	3–2	1–1	7–2	0–1	0–3	3–2	1–5	3–1
Alki	4–2		2–2	2–1	0–2	2–0	1–0	0–1	0–1	1–1	1–1
Anorthosis	2–2	1–1		2–1	1–1	2–0	1–0	3–2	5–1	2–2	3–5
APOEL	4–2	4–0	3–4		4–0	10–0	1–0	0–1	2–3	0–2	1–1
Apollon	2–0	5–2	1–0	0–2		1–0	0–1	2–0	1–3	1–3	0–4
Aris	3–4	0–1	0–9	2–0	0–3		0–2	4–1	0–5	1–2	2–2
EPA	2–0	3–6	1–1	0–4	1–1	3–0		1–2	1–0	1–2	1–3
Nea Salamis	3–2	7–0	4–1	2–0	0–0	1–0	1–0		1–1	4–0	2–0
Olympiakos	2–3	6–4	0–1	1–0	1–0	9–1	6–0	6–3		1–0	5–2
Omonia	2–0	1–0	1–0	2–2	4–2	5–0	2–1	1–1	2–4		2–1
Pezoporikos	2–0	0–0	2–2	2–2	5–2	6–1	1–1	0–0	1–3	0–3	

Legend: Blue = home team win; Yellow = draw; Red = away team win.
