= 1960–61 Cypriot First Division =

Cypriot First Division
- Season: 1960–61

The 1960–61 Cypriot First Division was the 23rd season of the Cypriot top-level football league.

== Overview ==
It was contested by 13 teams, and AC Omonia won the championship.

== League standings ==
Pos	Team	Pld	W	D	L	GF	GA	GD	Pts
1	AC Omonia (C)	24	20	2	2	91	23	+68	42
2	Anorthosis Famagusta FC	24	17	1	6	61	27	+34	35
3	Pezoporikos Larnaca	24	10	9	5	49	31	+18	29
4	AEL Limassol	24	11	7	6	59	39	+20	29
5	APOEL F.C.	24	13	2	9	62	41	+21	28
6	Apollon Limassol	24	12	4	8	61	52	+9	28
7	Aris Limassol F.C.	24	8	9	7	36	39	−3	25
8	Nea Salamis FC	24	10	4	10	47	41	+6	24
9	EPA Larnaca FC	24	9	5	10	40	50	−10	23
10	Olympiakos Nicosia	24	7	5	12	43	52	−9	19
11	Orfeas Nicosia	24	5	3	16	24	57	−33	13
12	Alki Larnaca FC	24	4	3	17	24	70	−46	11
13	AYMA	24	1	4	19	24	99	−75	6

(C) Champions

== Results ==
Home \ Away	AEL	ALK	ANR	APN	APL	ARS	AYM	EPA	NSL	OLY	OMO	ORF	POL
AEL		4–2	2–1	0–3	0–0	1–1	4–2	4–1	8–2	4–0	1–1	7–0	3–2
Alki	1–1		0–1	1–4	1–2	0–1	3–1	1–2	1–2	1–2	0–3	4–2	0–1
Anorthosis	2–0	8–1		2–0	4–0	2–0	8–1	5–2	2–1	2–1	0–1	4–2	5–1
APOEL	0–4	2–2	0–3		2–4	4–2	7–1	2–0	2–0	2–0	1–3	1–0	1–1
Apollon	2–2	6–1	3–0	1–8		0–1	6–0	2–2	0–1	4–2	4–2	4–2	6–4
Aris	3–2	4–0	2–2	3–1	1–0		5–0	2–2	0–0	1–1	2–5	2–1	0–0
AYMA	1–5	3–1	0–2	1–7	1–3	1–1		1–3	1–4	2–2	1–7	0–0	1–1
EPA	1–1	0–2	4–2	3–4	4–3	2–0	5–0		1–0	2–1	1–6	2–0	0–0
Nea Salamis	6–1	6–0	1–2	3–2	2–1	2–2	4–0	2–1		3–4	2–3	0–0	2–0
Olympiakos	1–2	4–0	0–2	1–5	2–4	2–2	6–3	4–2	1–1		3–2	0–1	2–2
Omonia	3–0	10–0	2–0	3–2	6–1	2–0	10–2	5–0	4–1	3–0		3–0	2–1
Orfeas	3–2	0–1	0–2	1–2	2–3	3–1	1–0	0–0	3–2	0–4	0–4		2–4
Pezoporikos	1–1	1–1	3–0	2–0	2–2	6–0	4–1	3–0	2–0	2–0	1–1	5–1	

Legend: Blue = home team win; Yellow = draw; Red = away team win.
