= 1964–65 Cypriot First Division =

Cypriot First Division
- Season: 1964–65

The 1964–65 Cypriot First Division was the 26th season of the Cypriot top-level football league.

== Overview ==
It was contested by 11 teams, and APOEL F.C. won the championship.

== League standings ==
Pos	Team	Pld	W	D	L	GF	GA	GD	Pts	Qualification
1	APOEL F.C. (C)	20	16	2	2	68	23	+45	34	Qualification for European Cup preliminary round
2	Olympiakos Nicosia	20	13	1	6	57	36	+21	27	
3	AEL Limassol	20	13	1	6	52	35	+17	27	
4	AC Omonia	20	10	5	5	48	35	+13	25	Qualification for Cup Winners' Cup first round
5	Anorthosis Famagusta FC	20	9	5	6	39	26	+13	23	
6	Apollon Limassol	20	7	6	7	31	34	−3	20	
7	Nea Salamis FC	20	5	7	8	33	42	−9	17	
8	EPA Larnaca FC	20	7	2	11	31	40	−9	16	
9	Alki Larnaca FC	20	5	4	11	28	40	−12	14	
10	Pezoporikos Larnaca	20	2	5	13	21	39	−18	9	
11	Aris Limassol F.C.	20	3	2	15	23	81	−58	8	

(C) Champions

== Results ==
Home \ Away	AEL	ALK	ANR	APN	APL	ARS	EPA	NSL	OLY	OMO	POL
AEL		4–1	3–6	0–5	1–0	8–2	3–1	2–0	3–0	1–2	3–0
Alki	2–1		1–1	1–1	0–2	3–0	1–0	2–3	2–4	0–2	3–1
Anorthosis	1–2	3–0		0–1	2–0	3–0	1–2	0–0	6–1	0–4	3–1
APOEL	3–1	5–2	3–5		6–1	3–0	4–2	5–0	2–0	3–2	3–0
Apollon	1–2	1–1	1–1	1–2		6–1	2–0	1–1	0–6	1–1	1–1
Aris	0–6	1–6	1–2	0–8	3–1		2–0	2–2	1–6	1–7	2–2
EPA	1–1	1–0	3–2	1–1	2–4	5–3		2–3	3–2	1–2	1–0
Nea Salamis	0–1	3–2	1–1	2–4	1–3	5–1	3–2		2–3	2–2	1–1
Olympiakos	4–1	5–1	1–0	2–1	2–3	2–0	2–0	3–2		4–4	2–3
Omonia	3–5	2–0	0–1	1–5	1–1	5–0	4–1	2–2	1–6		2–1
Pezoporikos	3–4	0–0	1–1	2–3	0–1	1–3	0–3	3–0	1–2	0–1	

Legend: Blue = home team win; Yellow = draw; Red = away team win.
