= Cypriot First Division =

Cyprus football league

- Organising body: Cyprus Football Association
- Founded: 1934; 92 years ago
- Country: Cyprus
- Confederation: UEFA
- Number of clubs: 14
- Level on pyramid: 1
- Relegation to: Cypriot Second Division
- Domestic cups: Cypriot Cup; Cypriot Super Cup
- International cup(s): UEFA Champions League; UEFA Europa League; UEFA Conference League
- Current champions: Omonia (22nd title) (2025–26)
- Most championships: APOEL (29 titles)
- Top scorer: Sotiris Kaiafas (1967–1984) (261 goals)
- Broadcasters: Cytavision; Cablenet
- Sponsor: Stoiximan
- Website: www.cfa.com.cy
- Current: 2026–27 Cypriot First Division

The Cypriot First Division (Greek: Πρωτάθλημα Α΄ Κατηγορίας), also known as the Cyprus League by Stoiximan for sponsorship reasons, is a professional association football league in Cyprus and the highest level of the Cypriot football league system. Operated by the Cyprus Football Association, the league is contested by fourteen teams and runs from August to May, with the three lowest-placed teams being relegated to the Cypriot Second Division, and replaced by the top three teams in that division.

== History ==
Football was introduced to Cyprus early in the 20th century by the British. Initially played in the island's schools, it proved hugely popular and a number of clubs were duly formed.

Anorthosis Famagusta FC was founded in 1911, after which many other clubs were established. In 1932, the annual Cypriot Championship began, at first unofficially. Every season, the championship was organised by a different football club, which caused conflict among some of the teams.

As football became more established, the clubs were united in agreeing that an official body was needed to regulate the sport. In September 1934, the Cyprus Football Association (CFA) was formed and the Cypriot Championship and Cup began to take place annually. The first Champions of Cyprus were Trust in 1935, but the club folded three years later. The 1930s were dominated by APOEL, who won five championships in a row until 1940. Like other championships throughout the world, the Cypriot Championship was interrupted due to World War II from 1941 until 1945.

In 1955, Çetinkaya Türk S.K., who had been the only Turkish Cypriot team playing in the Cypriot First Division since 1934–35, withdrew from the Championship and, along with other Turkish Cypriot teams, established the Cyprus Turkish Football Association, with its own competitions. The reason behind this was political, as the Turkish Cypriots were opposed to the anticolonial struggle of EOKA and union with Greece (enosis). However, this federation was never recognised, and none of its teams was permitted to play in international competitions.

Cypriot independence in 1960 was followed by full UEFA membership for the Cyprus Football Association in 1962. From 1963, the champions of Cyprus could compete in the European Cup and the Cup winners in the European Cup Winners Cup. The runners-up in the Greek Cypriot First Division began to compete in the UEFA Cup in 1971. From 1967 until 1974, the Greek Cypriot Champions were promoted to the Greek First National Division. Greek Cypriot teams were relegated every season from the Alpha Ethniki, apart from 1973–74, when APOEL managed to remain in the Greek Championship, which meant that Cyprus would have two teams in Greek top tier. However, due to the Turkish invasion of Cyprus that year, APOEL and Omonia (the 1973–74 Cypriot champions) withdrew from the League.

From the beginning of the 2000s, the Cypriot First Division started to improve in quality which leaded to some surprising runs to the Champions League by teams like Anorthosis Famagusta, APOEL Nicosia and most recently Paphos. The Cyprus national team couldn't benefit from this success, as most game time among most teams in the Cypriot First Division go to foreign players.

== Format ==
=== Current format ===
As of the 2024-25 season, 14 clubs compete in the league, and are ranked based on the point system described below. Each club plays the other sides twice, home and away, for a total of 26 games for each club. This is referred to as the first round of the league. In the second round, the teams are divided into two groups; the teams ranked 1st to 6th play off for the title and European spots in Group A, while the bottom eight teams battle to avoid relegation in Group B. Group A is often referred to as the Championship Play-offs, while Group B is referred to as the Relegation Play-offs. Each team's points and criteria, such as goal difference, goals scored, etc. are retained during the transition from first to second round. Similarly to the first round, in Group A every club plays the other sides twice, for a total of 10 games. In Group B however, every club plays the other sides once either home or away, for a total of 7 games.

At the end of the second round, the club ranked 1st in Group A is declared the winner of the league. The champion qualifies for the UEFA Champions League, while the second and third placed teams enter the UEFA Europa Conference League. If the cup winners finish in third or above, the fourth placed team also enters the UEFA Europa Conference League. Meanwhile, the bottom three teams in Group B are relegated to the Second Division.

=== Previous formats ===
From 2007–08 until 2012–13 season, in the second round, the first 12 (out of 14) teams were separated into three groups of four teams according to their position at the end of the first round. For the 2013–14 season, in the second round, the first 12 (out of 14) teams were separated into two groups of six teams according to their position at the end of the first round. The last two teams of the first round were relegated directly to the B1 Division and the bottom two teams of the relegation group also. The points from the first round were carried to the second round and the teams played each other twice.

=== Point system ===
The point system of the Cypriot First Division has changed throughout the years:

1. From 1934–35 until 1959–60, teams were awarded two points for a win, one point for a draw and zero points for a defeat.
2. From 1960–61 until 1969–70, teams were awarded three points for a win, two points for a draw and one point for a defeat.
3. From 1970–71 until 1990–91, teams were awarded two points for a win, one point for a draw and zero points for a defeat.
4. Since the 1991–92 season, teams are awarded three points for a win, one point for a draw and zero points for a defeat.

In the event that two or more teams have the same number of points, they are ranked based on:

1. Points gained in games between the teams, in both rounds.
2. Goal difference in games between the teams, in both rounds.
3. Most away goals scored in games between the teams, in both rounds.
4. Goal difference across all games, in both rounds.
5. Most goals scored across all games, in both rounds.

== Teams ==
The 14 teams which participate in the 2026-27 season of the Cypriot First Division are:

- AEK Larnaca
- AEL Limassol
- Anorthosis Famagusta
- APOEL
- Apollon Limassol
- Aris Limassol
- Karmiotissa FC
- Krasava ENY Ypsonas
- Nea Salamis
- Olympiakos Nicosia
- Omonia 29M
- Omonia Aradippou
- Omonia
- Pafos FC

== Champions ==
The table presents all the winners and runner-ups since the 1934–35 season, when the competition officially began.

Key to list of winners
‡	Winning team won the Domestic Double (League title and Cypriot Cup)
(#)	Number of trophy won by club

Season	Winner	Runner-up
1934–35	Trust ‡ (1)	Çetinkaya Türk
1935–36	APOEL (1)	Trust
1936–37	APOEL ‡ (2)	Trust
1937–38	APOEL (3)	Trust
1938–39	APOEL (4)	EPA Larnaca
1939–40	APOEL (5)	Pezoporikos Larnaca
1940–41	AEL Limassol (1)	APOEL
1941–42	Suspended due to World War II	
1942–43	Suspended due to World War II	
1943–44	Suspended due to World War II	
1944–45	EPA Larnaca ‡ (1)	APOEL
1945–46	EPA Larnaca ‡ (2)	APOEL
1946–47	APOEL ‡ (6)	EPA Larnaca
1947–48	APOEL (7)	AEL Limassol
1948–49	APOEL (8)	Anorthosis Famagusta
1949–50	Anorthosis Famagusta (1)	EPA Larnaca
1950–51	Çetinkaya Türk (1)	APOEL
1951–52	APOEL (9)	EPA Larnaca
1952–53	AEL Limassol (2)	Pezoporikos Larnaca
1953–54	Pezoporikos Larnaca (1)	APOEL
1954–55	AEL Limassol (3)	Pezoporikos Larnaca
1955–56	AEL Limassol (4)	APOEL
1956–57	Anorthosis Famagusta (2)	Pezoporikos Larnaca
1957–58	Anorthosis Famagusta (3)	Pezoporikos Larnaca
1958–59	Not held	
1959–60	Anorthosis Famagusta (4)	Omonia
1960–61	Omonia (1)	Anorthosis Famagusta
1961–62	Anorthosis Famagusta ‡ (5)	Omonia
1962–63	Anorthosis Famagusta (6)	APOEL
1963–64	Championship abandoned	
1964–65	APOEL (10)	Olympiakos Nicosia
1965–66	Omonia (2)	Olympiakos Nicosia
1966–67	Olympiakos Nicosia (1)	APOEL
1967–68	AEL Limassol (5)	Omonia
1968–69	Olympiakos Nicosia (2)	Omonia
1969–70	EPA Larnaca (3)	Pezoporikos Larnaca
1970–71	Olympiakos Nicosia (3)	Digenis Morphou
1971–72	Omonia ‡ (3)	EPA Larnaca
1972–73	APOEL ‡ (11)	Olympiakos Nicosia
1973–74	Omonia ‡ (4)	Pezoporikos Larnaca
1974–75	Omonia (5)	Enosis Neon Paralimni
1975–76	Omonia (6)	APOEL
1976–77	Omonia (7)	APOEL
1977–78	Omonia (8)	APOEL
1978–79	Omonia (9)	APOEL
1979–80	APOEL (12)	Omonia
1980–81	Omonia ‡ (10)	APOEL
1981–82	Omonia ‡ (11)	Pezoporikos Larnaca
1982–83	Omonia ‡ (12)	Anorthosis Famagusta
1983–84	Omonia (13)	Apollon Limassol

Season	Winner	Runner-up
1984–85	Omonia (14)	APOEL
1985–86	APOEL (13)	Omonia
1986–87	Omonia (15)	APOEL
1987–88	Pezoporikos Larnaca (2)	APOEL
1988–89	Omonia (16)	Apollon Limassol
1989–90	APOEL (14)	Omonia
1990–91	Apollon Limassol (1)	Anorthosis Famagusta
1991–92	APOEL (15)	Anorthosis Famagusta
1992–93	Omonia (17)	Apollon Limassol
1993–94	Apollon Limassol (2)	Anorthosis Famagusta
1994–95	Anorthosis Famagusta (7)	Omonia
1995–96	APOEL ‡ (16)	Anorthosis Famagusta
1996–97	Anorthosis Famagusta (8)	Apollon Limassol
1997–98	Anorthosis Famagusta ‡ (9)	Omonia
1998–99	Anorthosis Famagusta (10)	Omonia
1999–2000	Anorthosis Famagusta (11)	Omonia
2000–01	Omonia (18)	Olympiakos Nicosia
2001–02	APOEL (17)	Anorthosis Famagusta
2002–03	Omonia (19)	Anorthosis Famagusta
2003–04	APOEL (18)	Omonia
2004–05	Anorthosis Famagusta (12)	APOEL
2005–06	Apollon Limassol (3)	Omonia
2006–07	APOEL (19)	Omonia
2007–08	Anorthosis Famagusta (13)	APOEL
2008–09	APOEL (20)	Omonia
2009–10	Omonia (20)	APOEL
2010–11	APOEL (21)	Omonia
2011–12	AEL Limassol (6)	APOEL
2012–13	APOEL (22)	Anorthosis Famagusta
2013–14	APOEL ‡ (23)	AEL Limassol
2014–15	APOEL ‡ (24)	AEK Larnaca
2015–16	APOEL (25)	AEK Larnaca
2016–17	APOEL (26)	AEK Larnaca
2017–18	APOEL (27)	Apollon Limassol
2018–19	APOEL (28)	AEK Larnaca
2019–20	Championship cancelled	
2020–21	Omonia (21)	Apollon Limassol
2021–22	Apollon Limassol (4)	AEK Larnaca
2022–23	Aris Limassol (1)	APOEL
2023–24	APOEL (29)	AEK Larnaca
2024–25	Pafos (1)	Aris Limassol
2025–26	Omonia (22)	AEK Larnaca
2026–27		

Notes:

- Following a decision by the Executive Committee of the Cyprus Football Association (CFA/KOP), upon the opinion of its legal advisor, on 19 June 2025, a request by AEK Larnaca was approved for the recognition of the titles of EPA Larnaca and Pezoporikos Larnaca in the name of AEK Larnaca.

== Performance by club ==
Titles won by club (%)
1. APOEL – 29 (34.1%)
2. Omonia – 22 (24.7%)
3. Anorthosis – 13 (15.3%)
4. AEL Limassol – 6 (7.06%)
5. AEK Larnaca – 5 (5.88%)
6. Apollon Limassol – 4 (4.71%)
7. Olympiakos Nicosia – 3 (3.53%)
8. Other teams – 4 (4.71%)

Club	Winners	Runners-up	Winning seasons
APOEL	29	21	1935–36, 1936–37, 1937–38, 1938–39, 1939–40, 1946–47, 1947–48, 1948–49, 1951–52, 1964–65, 1972–73, 1979–80, 1985–86, 1989–90, 1991–92, 1995–96, 2001–02, 2003–04, 2006–07, 2008–09, 2010–11, 2012–13, 2013–14, 2014–15, 2015–16, 2016–17, 2017–18, 2018–19, 2023–24
Omonia	22	16	1960–61, 1965–66, 1971–72, 1973–74, 1974–75, 1975–76, 1976–77, 1977–78, 1978–79, 1980–81, 1981–82, 1982–83, 1983–84, 1984–85, 1986–87, 1988–89, 1992–93, 2000–01, 2002–03, 2009–10, 2020–21, 2025–26
Anorthosis	13	10	1949–50, 1956–57, 1957–58, 1959–60, 1961–62, 1962–63, 1994–95, 1996–97, 1997–98, 1998–99, 1999–2000, 2004–05, 2007–08
AEL Limassol	6	2	1940–41, 1952–53, 1954–55, 1955–56, 1967–68, 2011–12
AEK Larnaca (Note: Includes wins and runner-ups of EPA Larnaca FC and Pezoporikos Larnaca FC until 1994.)	5	20	1944–45, 1945–46, 1953–54, 1969–70, 1987–88
Apollon Limassol	4	6	1990–91, 1993–94, 2005–06, 2021–22
Olympiakos Nicosia	3	4	1966–67, 1968–69, 1970–71
Trust	1	3	1934–35
Aris Limassol	1	1	2022–23
Çetinkaya Türk	1	1	1950–51
Pafos	1	—	2024–25
Digenis Morphou	—	1	–
Enosis Neon Paralimni	—	1	–

Notes:

- Following a decision by the Executive Committee of the Cyprus Football Association (CFA/KOP), upon the opinion of its legal advisor, on 19 June 2025, a request by AEK Larnaca was approved for the recognition of the titles of EPA Larnaca and Pezoporikos Larnaca in the name of AEK Larnaca.

== Appearances in the top division ==
The below table indicates the total number of seasons each club has participated in the Cypriot First Division, up to and including the 2026/27 season.

46 teams have played at least one season in the Cypriot First Division.

Teams in bold are participating in the 2026-27 Cypriot First Division.

Team	Participations
**AEL Limassol**	86
**APOEL FC**	86
**Anorthosis Famagusta FC**	81
**Olympiakos Nicosia**	73
**AC Omonia**	71
**Apollon Limassol**	68
**Nea Salamis Famagusta FC**	64
**Aris Limassol FC**	59
Enosis Neon Paralimni FC	52
EPA Larnaca FC	50
Pezoporikos Larnaca FC	49
Alki Larnaca FC	43
Ethnikos Achna FC	37
**AEK Larnaca FC**	32
Doxa Katokopias FC	20
APOP Paphos FC	19
Çetinkaya Türk S.K.	18

Team	Participations
Evagoras Paphos	18
Digenis Akritas Morphou FC	15
**Omonia Aradippou**	16
Ermis Aradippou FC	14
AYMA	11
**Pafos FC**	11
AEP Paphos FC	10
ASIL Lysi	8
Anagennisi Deryneia FC	7
APEP FC	7
**Karmiotissa FC**	6
APOP Kinyras FC	5
Ayia Napa FC	4
Keravnos Strovolou FC	4
Orfeas Nicosia	4
Enosis Neon Trust	4
Ethnikos Assia FC	3

Team	Participations
AEZ Zakakiou	2
Akritas Chlorakas	2
Alki Oroklini	2
Chalkanoras Idaliou	2
**Krasava ENY Ypsonas FC**	2
Othellos Athienou FC	2
**PAC Omonia 29M**	2
AEK Kouklia	1
Atromitos Yeroskipou	1
Enosis Neon THOI Lakatamia	1
Onisilos Sotira	1
PAEEK	1

Notes:

- Reference data is up until 2022/23, but the table above is until 2026/27
- The 1963–64 Cypriot First Division, where the championship was abandoned, is not included in the table.
- Çetinkaya's total includes 12 when competing as Lefkosa Turk Spor Kulubu
- APEP Pitsilia total includes one as APEP Limassol

== All-time Cypriot First Division table ==
The All-time Cypriot First Division table is a ranking of all Cypriot football clubs based on their performance in the Cypriot First Division, from its debut in 1934–35 until 2025–26. The points are the sum of the points of all seasons, despite the point system of the season. The 1963–64 Cypriot First Division season is not included because the championship was abandoned.

Rank	Club	Seasons	Points	GP	W	D	L	GF	GA	GD
1	APOEL FC	85	3698	2056	1206	451	399	4426	2039	2387
2	AC Omonia	70	3505	1895	1147	389	359	3967	1808	2159
3	Anorthosis Famagusta FC	80	3316	2042	1010	517	515	3580	2351	1229
4	Apollon Limassol	67	2938	1859	857	480	522	3112	2226	886
5	AEL Limassol	85	2822	2059	852	491	716	3274	2842	432
6	Nea Salamis Famagusta FC	63	2054	1681	561	429	691	2290	2556	-266
7	Olympiakos Nicosia	72	1868	1665	540	408	716	2401	2998	-597
8	Enosis Neon Paralimni FC	52	1628	1454	469	405	580	1844	2034	-190
9	Aris Limassol FC	58	1602	1487	419	369	699	1960	2818	-858
10	AEK Larnaca FC	31	1516	906	431	223	288	1507	1128	379
11	Pezoporikos Larnaca FC	49	1432	1062	444	318	300	1719	1326	393
12	Ethnikos Achna FC	37	1296	1096	352	269	475	1449	1698	-249
13	EPA Larnaca FC	50	1222	1052	362	277	413	1570	1641	-71
14	Alki Larnaca FC	43	1202	1128	309	284	535	1400	1986	-586
15	Doxa Katokopias FC	20	625	641	160	145	336	704	1160	-456
16	Pafos FC	10	524	343	147	89	107	492	377	115
17	APOP Paphos FC	19	406	502	105	126	271	501	1007	-506
18	Ermis Aradippou FC	14	404	446	106	90	250	471	893	-422
19	Evagoras Paphos	18	371	480	90	136	254	431	906	-475
20	Digenis Akritas Morphou FC	15	339	396	94	110	192	397	690	-293
21	AEP Paphos FC	10	315	278	81	72	125	376	478	-102
22	Omonia Aradippou	15	309	423	86	103	236	378	786	-408
23	Çetinkaya Türk S.K.	18	189	209	77	35	97	393	503	-110
24	Karmiotissa FC	5	183	189	46	45	98	208	357	-149
25	ASIL Lysi	8	180	198	37	40	121	169	430	-261
26	APOP Kinyras FC	5	161	148	44	29	75	201	275	-74
27	Orfeas Nicosia	4	134	90	24	16	50	110	180	-70
28	Anagennisi Deryneia FC	7	123	186	31	35	120	163	409	-247
29	Armenian Young Men's Association	11	121	176	23	27	126	256	593	-337
30	APEP FC	7	101	192	25	34	133	158	460	-302
31	Keravnos Strovolou FC	4	84	108	28	28	52	111	167	-56
32	Akritas Chlorakas	2	69	73	19	12	42	68	131	-63
33	Enosis Neon Trust	4	68	44	30	8	6	129	54	75
34	Ayia Napa FC	4	64	110	12	28	70	90	218	-128
35	Ethnikos Assia FC	3	60	78	17	9	52	102	184	-82
36	Othellos Athienou FC	2	58	72	13	19	40	75	119	-44
37	Alki Oroklini	2	52	68	21	11	36	83	131	-48
38	Chalkanoras Idaliou	2	43	60	16	11	33	59	116	-57
39	Krasava ENY Ypsonas FC	1	40	33	11	7	15	36	44	-8
40	AEZ Zakakiou	2	29	66	3	20	43	60	163	-103
41	AEK Kouklia FC	1	23	36	6	5	25	34	94	-60
42	PAEEK	1	17	32	3	8	21	25	61	-36
43	PAC Omonia 29M	1	14	33	3	5	25	23	65	-42
44	Onisilos Sotira	1	13	26	3	4	19	22	63	-41
45	Atromitos Yeroskipou	1	7	26	1	4	21	19	69	-50
46	Enosis Neon THOI Lakatamia	1	7	26	1	4	21	15	75	-60

== Records & statistics ==
=== Team ===
Description	Record	Details
Most championships	29	APOEL
Most consecutive championships	7	APOEL (2012–13 to 2018–19)
Most runner-ups without ever winning	1	Digenis Morphou (1970–71); Enosis Neon Paralimni (1974–75)
Longest gap between championships	44 years	AEL Limassol (1967–68-2011–12)

=== Longest unbeaten run in the First Division ===
	Team	Played	Period	
	Team	Played	First Matchday	Last Matchday
1	Omonia	46	1983–84 (16th Matchday)	1985–86 (8th Matchday)
2	APOEL	40	1945–46 (6th Matchday)	1949–50 (1st Matchday)
3	Omonia	40	1976–77 (16th Matchday)	1977–78 (25th Matchday)
4	Anorthosis	38	1998–99 (9th Matchday)	1999–00 (20th Matchday)
5	Anorthosis	38	2006–07 (26th Matchday)	2008–09 (5th Matchday)

=== Most wins in a row in the First Division ===
	Team	Played	Period	
	Team	Played	First Matchday	Last Matchday
1	APOEL	20	1947–48 (4th Matchday)	1949–50 (1st Matchday)
2	APOEL	19	1945–46 (6th Matchday)	1947–48 (2nd Matchday)
3	Omonia	16	1986–87 (5th Matchday)	1986–87 (20th Matchday)
4	APOEL	16	2008–09 (14th Matchday)	2008–09 (29th Matchday)
5	Omonia	15	1981–82 (6th Matchday)	1981–82 (20th Matchday)

== See also ==
- Cypriot First Division top goalscorers
- List of foreign football players in Cypriot First Division

== Bibliography ==
- Γαβριηλίδης, Μιχάλης; Παπαμωυσέως, Στέλιος (2001). Ένας αιώνας Κυπριακό ποδόσφαιρο. Λευκωσία: Ο Συγγραφέας. ISBN 9963-8720-1-8.
