= 1966–67 Cypriot First Division =

Cypriot First Division
- Season: 1966–67

The 1966–67 Cypriot First Division was the 28th season of the Cypriot top-level football league.

== Overview ==
It was contested by 12 teams, and Olympiakos Nicosia won the championship.

== League standings ==
Pos	Team	Pld	W	D	L	GF	GA	GD	Pts	Qualification
1	Olympiakos Nicosia (C)	22	14	5	3	74	26	+48	33	Qualification for European Cup first round
2	APOEL F.C.	22	15	3	4	89	33	+56	33	
3	Anorthosis Famagusta FC	22	14	4	4	55	29	+26	32	
4	AC Omonia	22	10	11	1	48	17	+31	31	
5	Nea Salamis FC	22	12	5	5	37	21	+16	29	
6	Apollon Limassol	22	11	6	5	50	25	+25	28	Qualification for Cup Winners' Cup first round
7	Alki Larnaca FC	22	9	1	12	44	43	+1	19	
8	AEL Limassol	22	7	5	10	41	42	−1	19	
9	Pezoporikos Larnaca	22	6	4	12	40	54	−14	16	
10	EPA Larnaca FC	22	6	3	13	36	53	−17	15	
11	Aris Limassol F.C.	22	1	3	18	17	102	−85	5	
12	APOP Paphos	22	1	2	19	21	107	−86	4	

(C) Champions

== Results ==
Home \ Away	AEL	ALK	ANR	APN	APL	APP	ARS	EPA	NSL	OLY	OMO	POL
AEL		0–1	3–3	4–2	1–4	4–1	7–0	1–2	1–1	1–4	0–0	2–1
Alki	1–2		2–4	1–2	0–5	6–0	8–1	2–1	0–1	1–3	2–2	4–2
Anorthosis	3–0	3–0		1–2	2–0	6–3	3–1	1–0	1–2	2–2	1–0	4–2
APOEL	7–1	4–1	1–2		3–1	10–1	17–1	8–3	1–0	2–4	2–2	5–2
Apollon	2–1	1–0	1–1	1–2		6–1	1–0	2–1	1–1	1–1	0–0	3–3
APOP	1–6	0–4	2–4	0–3	1–9		5–0	0–7	0–5	1–2	1–4	1–4
Aris	1–1	2–3	2–7	0–6	0–4	1–1		0–3	0–2	0–5	0–5	2–4
EPA	1–5	2–3	0–2	1–1	2–1	1–1	2–2		0–1	1–10	2–4	2–0
Nea Salamis	4–0	3–1	2–0	0–2	2–1	2–0	0–4	1–2		2–2	0–1	2–0
Olympiakos	3–0	3–2	1–3	5–2	1–2	10–1	5–0	1–0	1–3		0–0	6–0
Omonia	0–0	1–0	2–1	1–1	2–2	6–0	9–0	5–3	0–0	1–1		2–0
Pezoporikos	1–0	1–2	1–1	1–6	1–2	7–1	4–0	2–0	3–3	1–4	1–1	

Legend: Blue = home team win; Yellow = draw; Red = away team win.
