= Nea Salamis Famagusta FC =

Nea Salamis Famagusta
- Full name: Νέα Σαλαμίνα Αμμοχώστου (Nea Salamis Famagusta)
- Nicknames: Ερυθρόλευκοι (Red and Whites)
- Founded: 7 March 1948; 78 years ago
- Ground: Ammochostos Epistrofi Stadium
- Capacity: 5,500
- Chairman: Paris Andreou
- Manager: Sofronis Avgousti
- League: First Division
- 2025–26: Second Division, 1st of 16 (promoted)
- Website: www.neasalamina.com
Home colours	Away colours

Nea Salamis Famagusta FC (alternatively Nea Salamina, Greek: Νέα Σαλαμίνα Αμμοχώστου) is a Cypriot professional football club based in Ammochostos (also known by its romanized name, Famagusta). It has been a refugee club since the 1974 Turkish invasion of Cyprus, when Turkey occupied the northern part of the island. There are also fraternal relations with Olympiacos. The club is temporarily based in Larnaca and supported by Meridian.

Nea Salamina's most notable achievements were its victories in the Cypriot Cup and the Cypriot Super Cup in 1990. Its highest finish in the Cypriot First Division is third place. During its first five years (1948–1953), the team participated in the Cyprus Amateur Football Federation championships. In 1953 the club joined the Cyprus Football Association (CFA), participating regularly in association championships and cup competitions. It has played in more than 50 Cypriot First Division seasons, ranking seventh in that category.

The team participated for the first time in European competition in 1990 at the European Cup Winners' Cup, and played in the 1995, 1997 and 2000 UEFA Intertoto Cups. The team is part of the Nea Salamina Famagusta sports club, which was founded in 1948; the parent club also fields a men's volleyball team. The club is named after the ancient city of Cyprus, Salamis or Salamina, which is located nearby modern Famagusta ("Nea" means "new" in Greek language).

== History ==
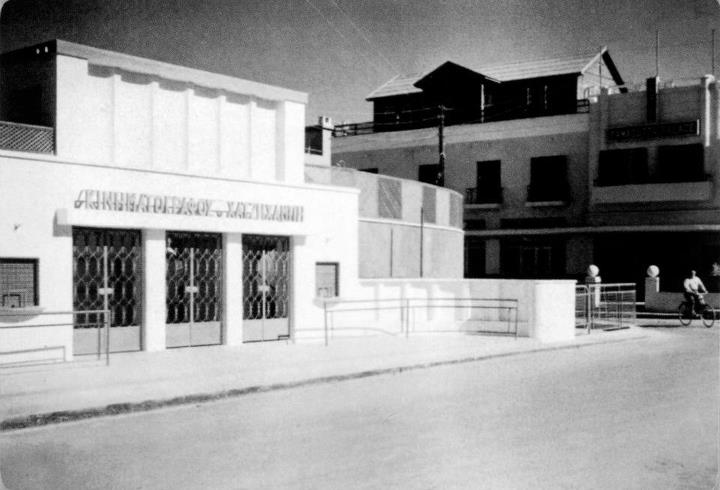
Cinema Hadjichambi where Nea Salamis Famagusta was established in 1948.

=== Early years ===
When Nea Salamina Famagusta was founded, Greece was entering a period of civil war between leftists and rightists. The situation in Greece affected Cyprus, both politically and socially; most athletes were also involved in politics. At this time, Famagusta had two sports clubs: the Evagoras Gymnastic Association, or GSE (Greek: Γυμναστικός Σύλλογος Ευαγόρας) and the Anorthosis Famagusta F.C. The GSE had many talented leftist athletes on its rosters. At Anorthosis, many players were also leftists. Under the influence of the contemporary right-wing political climate, the GSE and Anorthosis began to restrict leftist athletes. Additionally, Anorthosis was hosting at their clubhouse the right-wing Cypriot National Party. In early 1947 a group from Famagusta (including leftists, members and non-members of GSE and Anorthosis) concluded there was room for another sports club in the city. Due to the existing restrictions, they envisioned a club which would appeal to everyone in Famagusta regardless of political affiliation.

On 14 February 1948 the decision was made to establish the club, and the Nea Salamina sports club was formed on 7 March 1948 as the first leftist athletic club in Cyprus. After the club's founding, many citizens expressed a desire to join; however, the football side was weak.

=== GSE Stadium banning and the CAFF ===
Before the Pancyprian Games in May 1948, the Hellenic Amateur Athletic Association (SEGAS) asked all gymnastics associations in Cyprus, their members and athletes, to sign a public declaration that would express their support to the rightists in Greek Civil War, to declare that they espoused "nationalist beliefs" and to repudiate the leftists. The right-wing athletic clubs and athletes signed the statements; the only club refusing to sign the statement was the Kinyras Paphos gymnastic association, which was excluded from the games. The left-wing athletes were opposed to the declaration, and refused to sign the statement. Among the first athletes who refused were GSE champions Antonis Totsis (Greek: Αντώνης Τότσης) and Nikis Georgiou (Greek: Νικής Γεωργίου). The GSE invited both athletes to apologize, but they insisted on their position that sports should be separate from politics. The left-wing athletes decided to support the Kinyras Paphos association if the decision to exclude it from the Pancyprian Games stood. The GSE was favored to win the competition, but finished third. As a reaction to the fact that athletes of Nea Salamina were not involved in the Pancyprian Games, the GSE president informed the club it was not welcome at the GSE Stadium. Persecution of GSE and Anorthosis athletes who supported their teammates followed. The stadium-use prohibition meant that Nea Salamina had nowhere to play.

Negative attitudes toward left-wing athletes prevailed in other Cypriot cities. In Larnaca, the Alki Larnaca F.C. was founded in April 1948. A month later, the Gymnastics Club Zeno (GSZ) banned Alki from using its GSZ Stadium; a similar proposal to exclude Turks and Catholics was rejected. The GSZ amended its constitution, prohibiting enrollment of new members unless they signed a declaration that "they espouse the Hellenic nationalistic ideals". This excluded left-wing athletes from becoming members or using its stadium. In May, Orfeas Nicosia was founded in Nicosia; that month, APOEL F.C. sent a greeting by telegram to SEGAS ("cordial brotherly greetings to the entire Greek youth athletes"), on the occasion of national games, and wished for the cessation of inner-nation mutiny. APOEL asked all members and athletes of the club to sign a declaration, supporting the content of the telegram. Leftist members and athletes of APOEL considered "inner-nation mutiny" as a challenge and political statement of the club, thus they distanced themselves from that statement. The Cypriot press encouraged a hostile climate with articles and commentary. This was followed by the indefinite suspension of five APOEL athletes (Lympouris, Tsialis, Gogakis, Xatzivasileiou and Christodoulou), who founded AC Omonia in June 1948 with former members of the APOEL. AS Kyrenia was later founded.

Due to their left-wing political beliefs, members of the new clubs were not accepted into the Cyprus Football Association (CFA) and they established a new football federation (the Cyprus Amateur Football Federation, or CAFF) in December 1948. The new federation organized leagues and cups, which attracted thousands of fans. The CAFF matches became more popular than those of the CFA. Six teams belonged to the CAFF: Nea Salamina in Famagusta, Omonia and Orfeas in Nicosia, Alki at Larnaca, AMOL at Limassol (renamed Antaeus in 1951) and Neos Asteras in Morphou.

=== Unification of Cypriot football ===
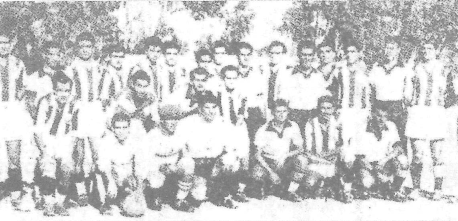
The first game after the unification of Cypriot football between Nea Salamis Famagusta FC and Anorthosis Famagusta F.C. at GSE Stadium, Famagusta at 1953

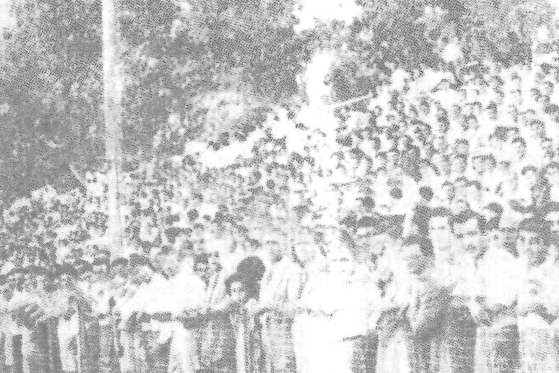
The fans at the first game after the unification of Cypriot football between Nea Salamina Famagusta FC and Anorthosis Famagusta F.C. at GSE Stadium, Famagusta at 1953

CAFF members favored the unification of football in Cyprus. They tried for three years to persuade the CFA to accept them as members, without success. The existence of two football federations (with two separate championships) in a country such as Cyprus was unprecedented. The situation created economic hardship, and hampered the development and improvement of Cypriot football. The clubs felt that sports should reflect fraternity and friendship rather than discrimination. In December 1952, the first issue of the sports newspaper Athlitiki supported the unification of Cypriot football. Foreign coaches of CFA clubs also supported unification, leading the CFA to respond that "their statements opposed the spirit of the Federation". Coaches of CFA's teams were initially hostile towards consolidation supporters. In summer 1953, the majority of Cypriot sportspeople expressed support for football unification. In August of that year Nea Salamina, Omonia, Alki and Antaeus submitted a joint application to the CFA to join the Cypriot First Division. On 19 September, the CFA accepted Nea Salamina and Omonia for membership. However, the organization's negative attitude towards those clubs continued. First, the league rejected applications from Alki, Orfeas Nicosia and Neos Asteras (although the first two joined a year later), and second, arguing that according to its constitution, only one team must participate in the Cypriot First Division and two teams in the second division. The CAFF clubs accepted these conditions in the interest of unification. In an ad hoc meeting of CAFF, members agreed that Omonia would join the first division and Nea Salamina and Antaeus the second division. Following these decisions, CAFF disbanded. The first game between teams from the two federations (a friendly) was played by Nea Salamina and Anorthosis at GSE Stadium on 27 September 1953. 5,200 fans were present at the game between the two Famagustian clubs. The final result was 3–1 in favor of Anorthosis, and the match was described as an evidence of superior sportsmanship and brotherhood of fans by Athlitiki.

=== Famagusta municipal stadium ===
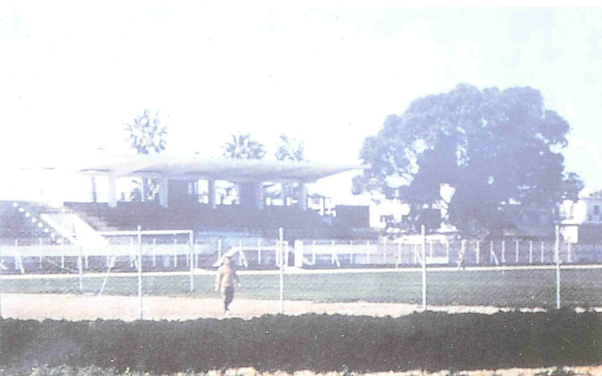
Famagusta municipal stadium, that was used for training of the Nea Salamis Famagusta FC until 1974 and was the home ground of the team the period 1952–1953

After being denied access to the GSE stadium, the club did not have a venue for training. They initially practiced at the Saint Lukas pitch (Proodou) in Famagusta and began efforts to build a privately owned stadium. In December 1948 Israel made a CYP£3,000 donation to the city of Famagusta, in gratitude for aid by its inhabitants to Jewish refugees, for a community-service project. Gabriel Makris, a Famagusta alderman and Nea Salamina footballer, supported the association's recommendation to build the stadium. The city council recognized the "financial assistance granted to the Jews to create Municipal Sports Stadium, which is available to Famagustans for the promotion and spread of mass popular sport". The stadium was available to Nea Salamina and other sports clubs.

In early 1949, volunteer construction work began on a municipal stadium in Saint John Famagusta parish. The stadium—the first in Cyprus with a roof over the stands—was built by supporters of the club and footballers and completed in 1952. It served as Nea Salamina's headquarters from 1952 to 1953.

In 1953, after the unification of football federations, Nea Salamina used GSE Stadium. The city's Municipal Stadium was used by the team for training. This period lasted until 1974, when Famagusta was occupied by the Turkish Army after the Turkish invasion in Cyprus and the club was forced to move its headquarters.

=== Ammochostos Epistrofi Stadium ===
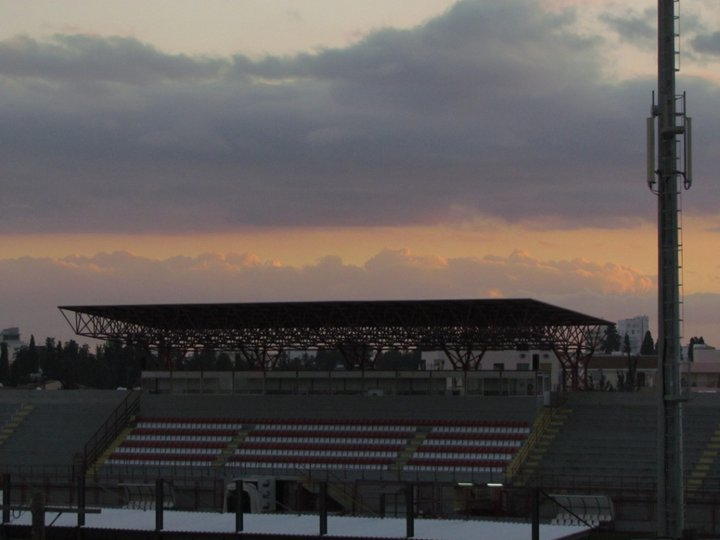
Ammochostos Epistrofi Stadium

From 1974 to 1991 Nea Salamina used GSZ Stadium in Larnaca, Dasaki Stadium in Dasaki Achnas, Municipal Stadium in Deryneia and Antonis Papadopoulos Stadium in Larnaca. In 1991 the team built its own stadium, Ammochostos Epistrofi Stadium.

Ammochostos Epistrofi Stadium, owned by Nea Salamina in Larnaca, has a 5,000-seat capacity and is primarily used for football. The club offices are in the same area. The stadium is named for the town of Famagusta (Greek: Αμμόχωστος; Ammochostos), the original home of Nea Salamina before the Turkish occupation, and was built in 1991 near the refugee camps. The decision to build the stadium was made in 1989; construction began in December of that year, and thanks to club supporters in Cyprus and abroad, the Cyprus Sports Organisation and volunteer labor, the stadium was completed on schedule. The first Nea Salamina Famagusta game in the new stadium was played on Saturday, 12 October 1991, against Evagoras Paphos. Nea Salamina won, 4–1. The stadium hosted the 1992 UEFA European Under-16 Championship final on 17 May 1992 between Germany and Spain, which Germany won 2–1.

=== Emblem and colors ===
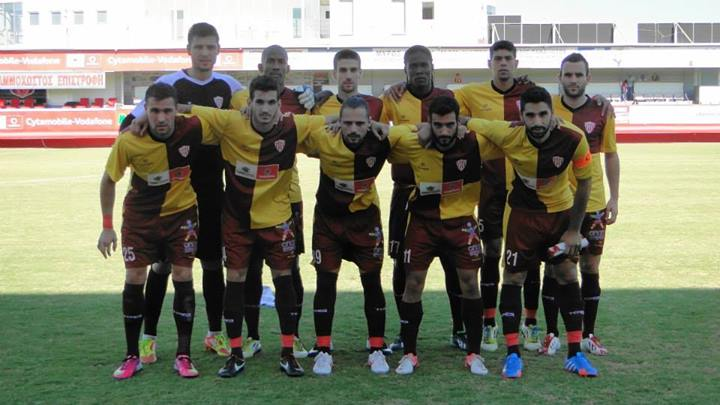
Nea Salamis for the first time with the 65 years anniversary kit, which was the kit of the team the period 1948–1950. (2013–14 Cypriot Cup against Karmiotissa Polemidion).

Nea Salamina's emblem incorporates the Olympic flame, the color red and the five rings of the Olympic Games. The club's colors during its first two years were yellow and crimson, when it was part of the Cyprus Amateur Football Federation. After 1950, the governing council changed its colors to red and white: red symbolizing power, and white symbolizing peace. Red-and-white striped jerseys were chosen because they resembled those worn by Olympiacos Piraeus.

== Competitions ==
=== CAFF ===
In five leagues of the Cyprus Amateur Football Federation, Nea Salamina failed to win a title; during its last two years, it finished second. The 1952–53 season saw the cup finalists losing 2–0 to AC Omonia at Gkooul stadium (Omonia's home pitch).

For 1948–49, no statistics are available. Nea Salamina played ten games, winning three (two at Neos Asteras and one against Alki), losing six and drawing once (against Alki).

=== Cypriot championships ===
==== 1953–1959 ====
After the 1953 unification of Cypriot football, Nea Salamina played in the Cypriot Second Division; its goal during the first season was winning promotion to the first division. Games were played in GSE Stadium, and the Famagusta Municipal Stadium was used for training. The second division had two groups; Nea Salamina was in the Nicosia-Larnaca-Famagusta group. The group winner faced the winner of the Limassol-Paphos group for promotion to first division. Nea Salamina finished second in its group, losing the chance at promotion. In the 1953–54 Cypriot Cup, the team reached the semi-finals. Nea Salamina was the first team, although struggling in the second division, qualified to the semi-finals of the Cypriot Cup

The next season the team led the second division, ensured its promotion. The league now had three groups, with Nea Salamina playing in the Larnaca-Famagusta group. With the conquest of the first position in the group, fought for the promotion with the first teams of the other two groups: the champion of the Limassol-Paphos group, Antaeus Lemesos, and the champion of the Nicosia group, Orfeas, in a new three teams championships. Nea Salamina finished in first place. During the same period, in the 1954–55 Cypriot Cup, excluded from subsequent phases one of the strongest teams of the season, APOEL with 3–2 win in GSE stadium. After 57 years, in the 2001–02 Cypriot Cup the team repeated this success; after struggling in the second division, it defeated future champion APOEL F.C. 1–0, winning away at GSP Stadium.

The 1955–56 Cypriot First Division saw the team participating for the first time as a newly promoted side. It finished third, four points behind champion AEL Limassol. Third position has been the team's highest finish, a position it has reached four times. Nea Salamina's first first-division game was against rival Anorthosis at their common ground, GSE Stadium. Nea Salamina won 3–2, its first victory against Anorthosis. The team's first years in first division saw victories over traditional league powerhouses APOEL FC, EPA Larnaca FC, Anorthosis Famagusta F.C., Pezoporikos Larnaca and AC Omonia, at home and away.

==== 1960s ====
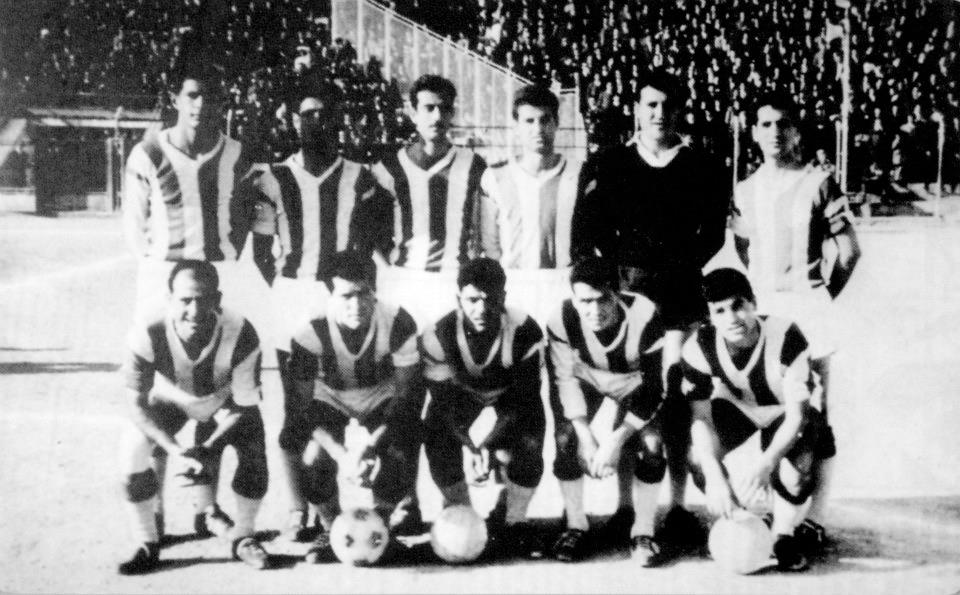
Nea Salamina Famagusta at 1965–1966

During the early years of the decade, Nea Salamina was strong in home games but weak away. Noteworthy is the conquest of the amateur championship from farm team the period 1960–61, The games of the farm team gathered the same interest with the main team among fans, who enthusiastically celebrated winning the title. During this period the nucleus for a successful team was created, including Kyriakos Koureas (who later played for Olympiakos Piraeus). In December 1963, the league disbanded; at that time, Nea Salamina was in a tight three-way race with Omonia and APOEL. With the creation of Cypriot National Guard, many Nea Salamina's players joined the army; players would often come straight from camps throughout Cyprus to play league games with no training.

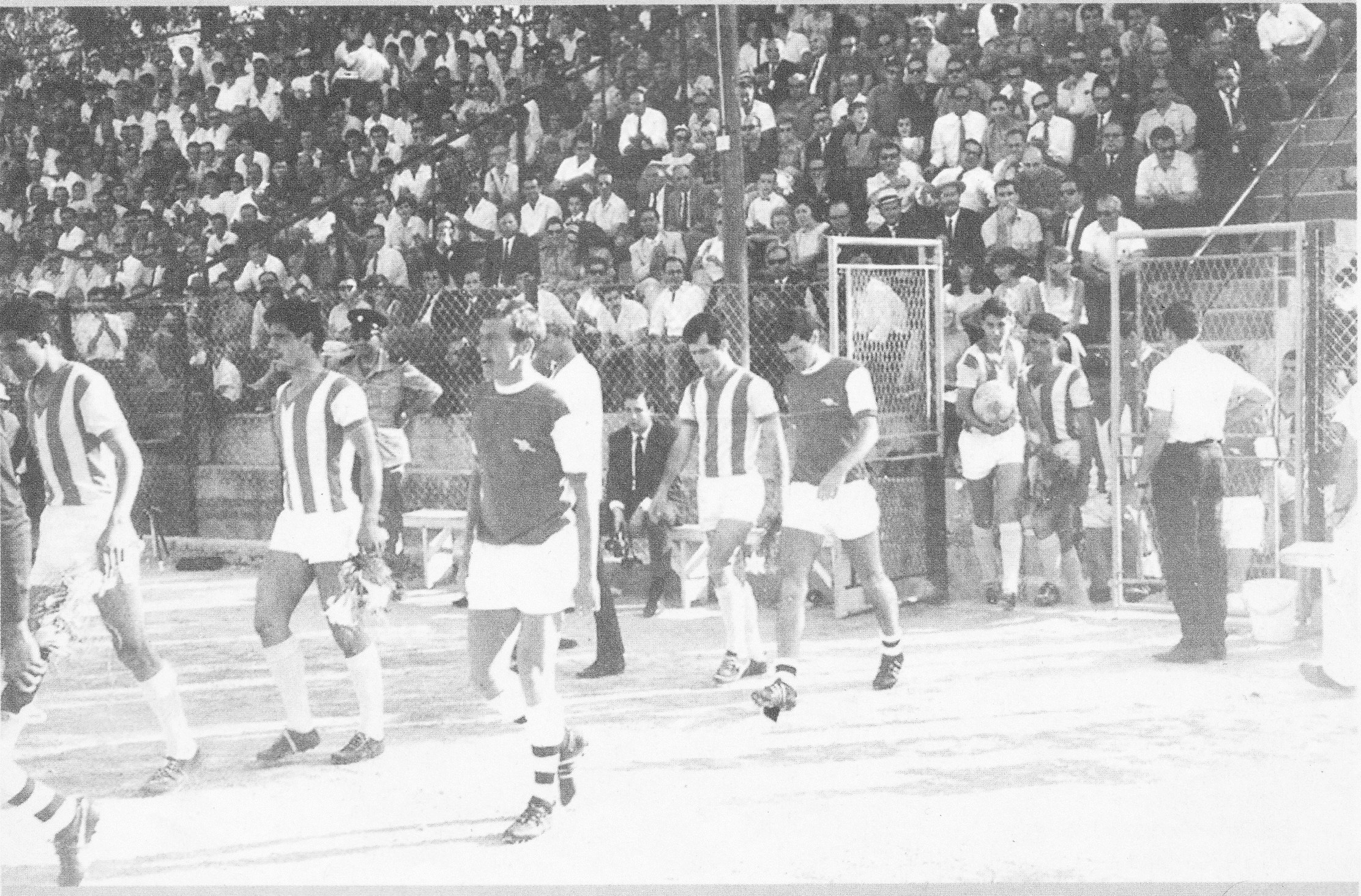
Nea Salamina Famagusta FC against Arsenal F.C., in 1967, in GSE Stadium, Famagusta for a friendly game

The 1965–66 season was one of the best (but painful) periods for Nea Salamina; the team arguably played the best football in Cyprus. The team contended for the championship until the last game of the season and lose its first cup final. In a game against APOEL at the old GSP stadium, Nea Salamina was leading 3–0. In the 62nd minute, an APOEL player hit a Nea Salamina's player; an APOEL grabbed and hid a linesman's flag. The game was halted, and the CFA ordered a rematch. The dispute lasted more than three weeks; in the meantime Nea Salamina was defeated by the bottommost team, Aris Limassol F.C. In the penultimate match of the tournament Omonia and Salamina were tied for first place on points, and Olympiacos was one point behind. In the game against Olympiakos Nicosia Nea Salamina was leading 2–1, but Olympiakos tied the game in allegedly excessive extra time. After clashes in the last few seconds, the game was halted and ordered replayed. Omonia was in first place with 50 points; Nea Salamina was second with 47 and Olympiakos third with 46. With a victory over Olympiakos Nea Salamina would win the championship, since it had more goals than Omonia. On 31 May 1966 many buses and cars drove from Famagusta to Nicosia, where Nea Salamina was defeated 6–3. The best defense in the league, which had allowed fifteen goals in nineteen games, allowed six in one game. For a second time, Nea Salamina finished third. This defeat affected team morale in the cup final with rival Apollon Limassol; although it was favored, the team lost 4–2. During this period Salamina had the best defense in the league, with 21 goals in 20 games (a team record).

Near the end of the 1966–67 season the board of Olympiakos reported rumors of future match-fixing between Nea Salamina and Anorthosis to the team, which its president denied. Nea Salamina defeated Anorthosis; Olympiacos won the league championship, despite its defeat by Omonia. The Olympiakos board apologized, congratulating Nea Salamina on its victory. By the end of the decade Nea Salamina was finishing mid-table, despite an outflow of players to other teams or the army.

==== 1970s ====
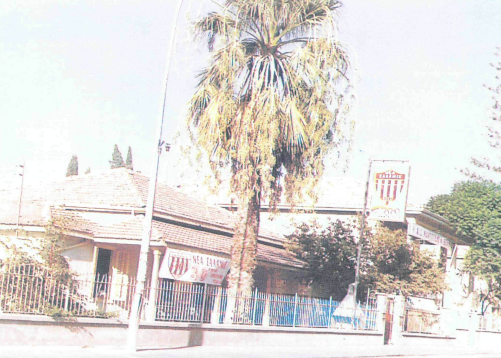
The first house of Nea Salamina Famagusta in Larnaca after becoming a refugee club

During the first two seasons of the 1970s, Nea Salamina finished in the middle of the table; the next two seasons threatened relegation, which was avoided. The club's low point was 14 August 1974, when the occupation of Famagusta by Turkish troops led to Nea Salamina becoming a refugee club. Fans and players scattered to unoccupied areas of Cyprus and abroad. In October, board members met at the offices of Aris Limassol, deciding to revive the club. Since most players were in Larnaca, it was decided to make Larnaca the club's temporary home. Its offices were housed temporarily at the offices of Alki Larnaca F.C. and in January 1975 acquired a rented building. Expenses were paid with contributions from members and friends of the club. Two youth academies were founded, in Larnaca and Limassol.

In late 1974, the CFA decided to schedule a special championship. Although board members were uncertain whether Nea Salamina should play (due to the refugee problem), they decided to participate so the team could remain in the Cypriot First Division and stay alive. Since there was no permanent stadium, the team used GSZ Stadium in 1974–75, the Deryneia municipal stadium in 1975–76, the GSZ Stadium again in 1976–77, Dasaki Stadium in Dasaki Achnas in 1977–78 and GSZ Stadium from 1978 to 1980.

By 1979, Nea Salamina was established in the first division. Despite a good start to the 1978–79 season, the team was demoted in the decisive last game to the second division after a quarter-century in the first division. The team's hopes rested both on defeating Enosis Neon Paralimni FC and Evagoras Paphos not to beat AC Omonia or Olympiakos Nicosia FC to lose by Alki Larnaca F.C. Nea Salamina won over Enosis Neon Paralimni FC (3–2), but none of the others happened as Evagoras won and Olympiakos tied with Alki.

In the summer of 1974, before the Turkish occupation, Nea Salamina signed Bulgarian coach Iancho Arsov, who went on to win titles with Omonia decades later. The agreement was canceled when financial problems caused by the team's refugee status made it impossible to pay for a foreign coach.

==== 1980s ====
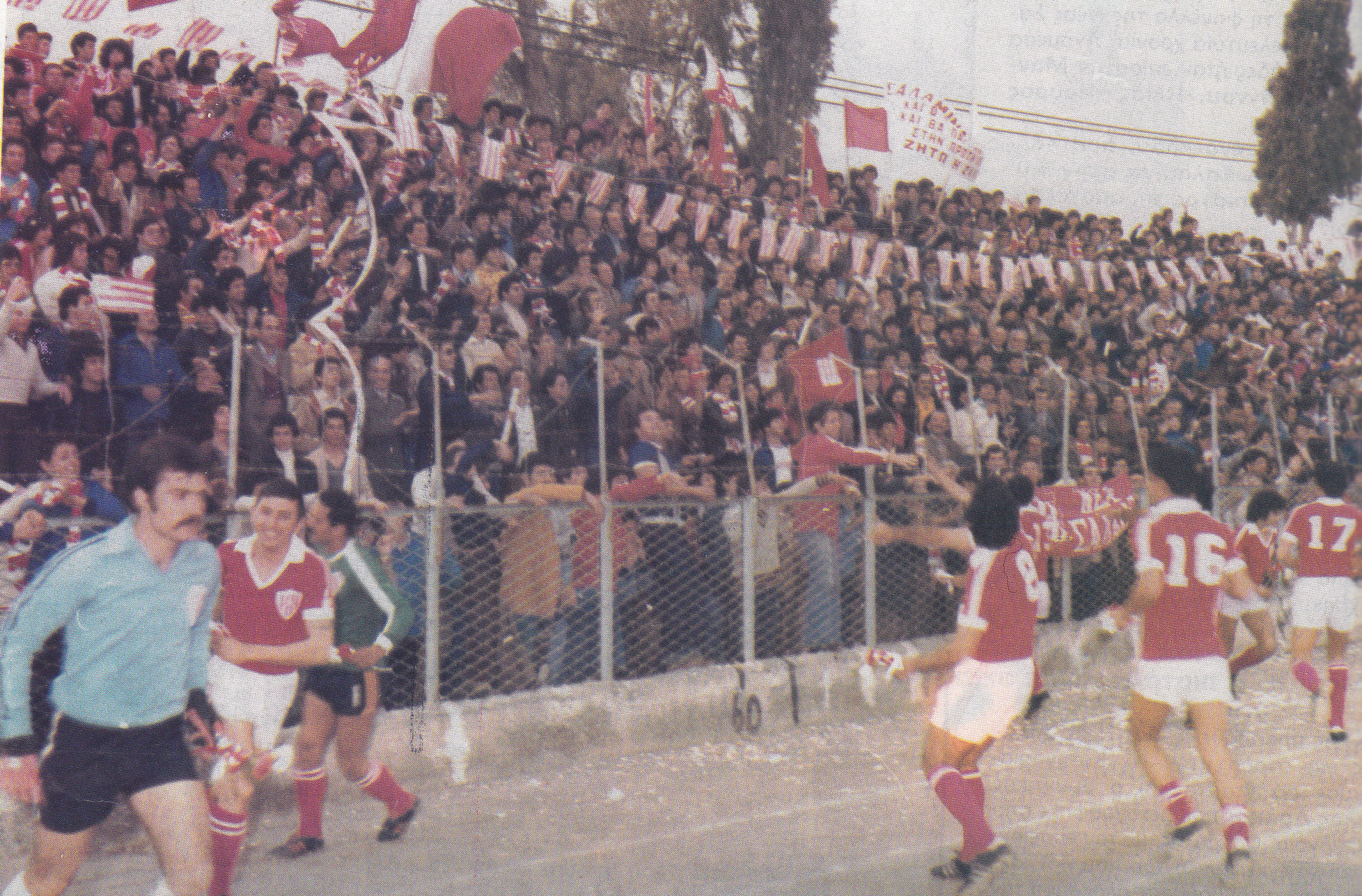
Nea Salamina Famagusta FC's fans and players celebrating, after the winning of the champion of Cypriot Second Division 1979–1980, at GSZ Stadium

During the 1979–80 season, Nea Salamina played in the second division. Many times fans at its matches outnumbered those of teams competing in the first division. The team easily won the league and returned to the first division for the 1980–81 season. At the first game they beat the later champion Omonia, 2–1, in an away game at Makario Stadium in Nicosia. This defeat was the first Omonia suffered at the stadium since they began competing in it. Nea Salamina finished seventh for the season.

For the 1981–82 season, Nea Salamina acquired foreign footballers for the first time, Bulgarians Nazca Michailiof and Stefan Pavlov. An unprecedented incident occurred during the 1982–83 season when, in a game against Enosis Neon Paralimni FC in GSZ Stadium, three Nea Salamina's players were expelled and the remaining players surrounded the linesman to protest. The linesman, claiming to have received blows, was transported to the hospital where radiographs failed to show injuries caused by the players. After the linesman made a formal complaint, a court imposed a sentence of 45 days. This was unprecedented for Cypriot football. The players remained in jail for five days and were released after public outcry, but then CFA authorities imposed crippling sanctions on them, ordering them to stay off the court for several months.

The next football seasons was not accompanied by discrimination. Until 1985, the team played at GSZ Stadium. In the 1985–86 season, they played seven games at Municipal Stadium in Deryneia and six in GSZ Stadium. They used GSZ Stadium exclusively for the 1986–87 season. From 1987 to 1988, the team used Antonis Papadopoulos Stadium in Larnaca for home games. The team finished fourth in the 1988–89 season, denied participation in the final by the subsequent winners AEL Limassol. During this period, Nea Salamina's player Nigel Maknil was named the league's top scorer, with 19 goals.

==== 1990s ====
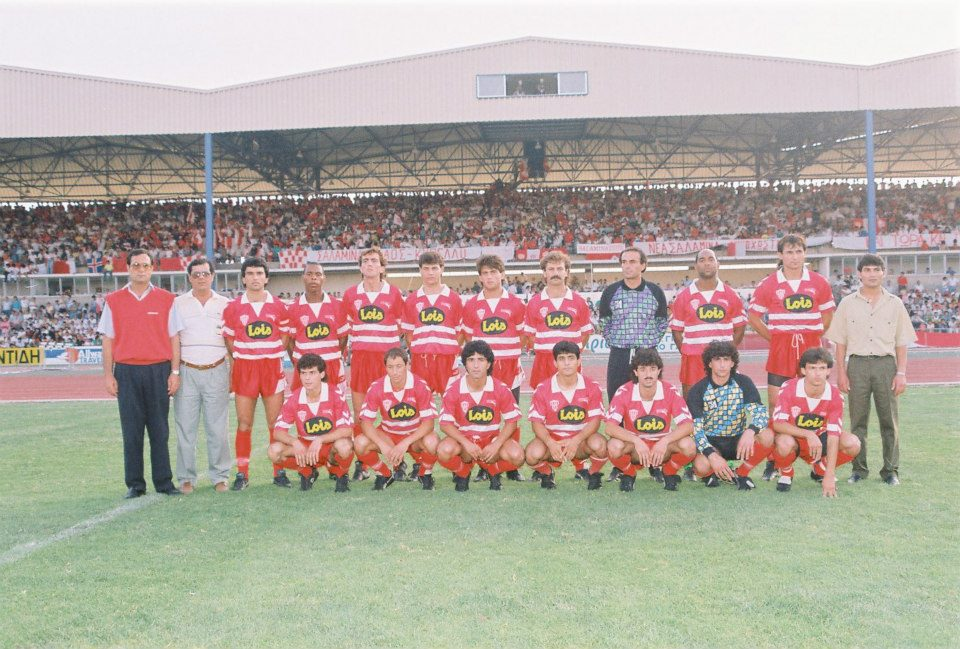
Nea Salamina Famagusta FC at Cypriot Cup Final 1989–1990 at Tsirion Stadium. At the background the fans of the team.

Cup winner

The 1989–90 season was the most successful in the history of the team when Nea Salamina won its first football title, the Cypriot Cup. The week before the final, many fans traveled to Cyprus from abroad to attend the game. Nea Salamina was the second refugee team to win a title since the 1974 occupation. In the final, on 8 June 1990, Nea Salamina defeated Omonia 3–2 at Tsirion Stadium in Limassol. Players competing in the final included Christakis Christofi, Artemis Andreou, Kipros Tsigkelis, Elissaios Psaras, Floros Nicholaou (captain), Kenny Dyer, Vangelis Adamou, Takis David, Christakis Mavros, Elias Elia, Charalambos Andreou (Pambis Andreou) and S. Anastasiou. Elias Elia, Christakis Mavros and Pambis Andreou scored the goals, and the coach was former Nea Salamina's player Andreas Mouskallis.

Shield winner

Salamina went on to take its second title in only a few months, the LTV Super Cup Shield, against rival APOEL, 1–0, at Makario Stadium, the opponents' home ground. Nigel Maknil scored the lone goal. That year, the shield was dedicated to 30 years of Cypriot independence.

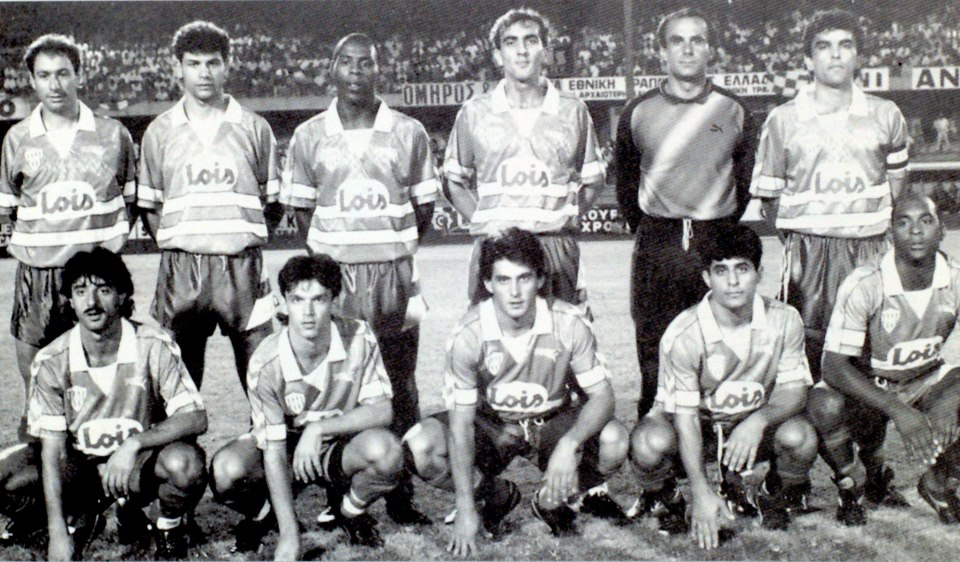
Nea Salamis Famagusta FC against Aberdeen F.C. for 1990–91 European Cup Winners' Cup at Tsirion Stadium in Limassol.

European participation

As cup winner, Nea Salamina played for the first time in a European cup (1990–91 European Cup Winners' Cup) and was eliminated in the first round by Aberdeen F.C. Aberdeen, who had won the 1982–83 European Cup Winners' Cup by defeating Real Madrid in the final, was a strong team. The first game was at Tsirion Stadium on 19 September 1990 before 8,000 fans. Nea Salamina was defeated, 2–0, after a scoreless tie at halftime. A rematch, played at Pittodrie Stadium in Aberdeen on 3 October, resulted in a 3–0 loss. Lineups for the two games were Christakis Christofi, Artemis Andreou, Kipros Tsigkelis, Elissaios Psaras, Floros Nikolaou, Kenny Dyer, Pambis Andreou, Takis David (replaced by Stavros Efthymiou in the 68th minute), Nigel Maknil (replaced by Christakis Mavros in the 85th minute), Elias Elias and Vangelis Adamou (home), and Yiannakis Ioannou, Andreas Artemis, Kipros Tsigkelis, Elissaios Psaras, Floros Nicholaou, Kenny Dyer, Vangelis Adamou, Mavros Christakis, Nigel Maknil (replaced by Pambis Andreou in the 47th minute), Elias Elias and Vassos Mavros (away).

The 1990s were the most successful decade for Nea Salamina. Apart from winning the cup, shield, and the right to play in the Cup Winners Cup, the team claimed the championship. In addition, the team acquired Ammochostos Epistrofi Stadium in Larnaca, built by volunteer supporters.

Nea Salamina claimed the 1992–93 Cypriot First Division championship. At the end of the first round they were in first place, ultimately finishing third. During the 1994–95 season, they were the first Cypriot team to participate in the Intertoto Cup. Pambis Andreou was the league's top scorer, with 25 goals. The team also played in the 1997 UEFA Intertoto Cup.

==== 2000s ====
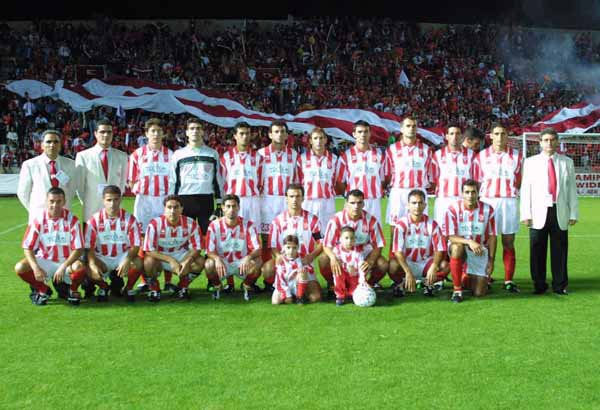
Nea Salamina Famagusta FC at 2000–01 Cypriot Cup Final at GSP Stadium. At the background the fans of the team.

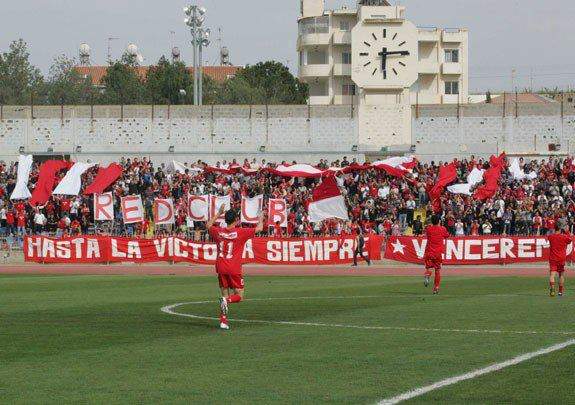
Nea Salamina Famagusta Fans at Makario Stadium, in the last game of 2008–09 Cypriot Second Division, winning Olympiakos Nicosia and the promotion to Cypriot First Division, leaving the opponent in the Cypriot Second Division.

During the first decade of the 21st century, Nea Salamina was relegated four times. The 1999–2000 season saw the team finish in fourth place, winning a spot in the 2000 UEFA Intertoto Cup. During the 2000–01 season, Nea Salamina finished twelfth and was relegated to the second division for the second time in its history. By the season's last game, the team's hopes rested both on defeating Digenis Akritas Morphou and Doxa Katokopias FC not to beat Apollo Limassol or Enosis Neon Paralimni FC to beat Ethnikos Achna FC. Nea Salamina easily won over Digenis, but Doxa also defeated Apollo and Ethnikos Achna's match with Enosis Neon Paralimni FC resulted in a draw. After defeating APOEL in the semi-finals, the team lost the 2000–01 Cypriot Cup final on 12 May 2012 to Apollo, 1–0, at GSP Stadium, becoming the first Cypriot football team to play in a cup final despite being relegated.

Nea Salamina became 2001–02-second-division champions, winning promotion to first division. The team eliminated future champion APOEL away in the 2001–02 Cypriot Cup, its second defeat of APOEL in several months, and made the quarterfinals.

In the 2002–03 season, the team was relegated again to second division, winning the championship of that division the following year and promoted again to first division. The 2004–05 season saw the squad finish sixth. With its stadium closed for repairs, the team played at Antonis Papadopoulos Stadium (except for two games at Makario Stadium). Nea Salamina returned to Ammochostos Epistrofi Stadium for the 2005–06 season, again finishing sixth. It finished 10th in the 2006–07 season and 13th in 2007–08, again relegated to the second division. After a difficult season in 2008–09, the team returned to first division, winning in the final game and leaving opponents Olympiacos, who only needed a draw to win the promotion, in the second division.

==== 2010s ====
Nea Salamina was again relegated to the second division during the 2009–10 season but was promoted to first division the following year. In the 2011–12 season, the team finished in seventh place. Due to finishing eleventh in the 2012–13 season, the team faced the 2012–13 Cypriot Second Division side Anagennisi Deryneia in a single-legged playoff for one spot in the 2013–14 Cypriot First Division. Nea Salamina won by 3–0, retaining its first division spot for the 2013–14 season. The next season, the team finished in seventh place. Nea Salamina won 54 points, but because on 17 May 2013 the team were deducted three points by CFA because they failed to meet the financial criteria of UEFA, they finished the season with 51 points.

==== Since 2020 ====
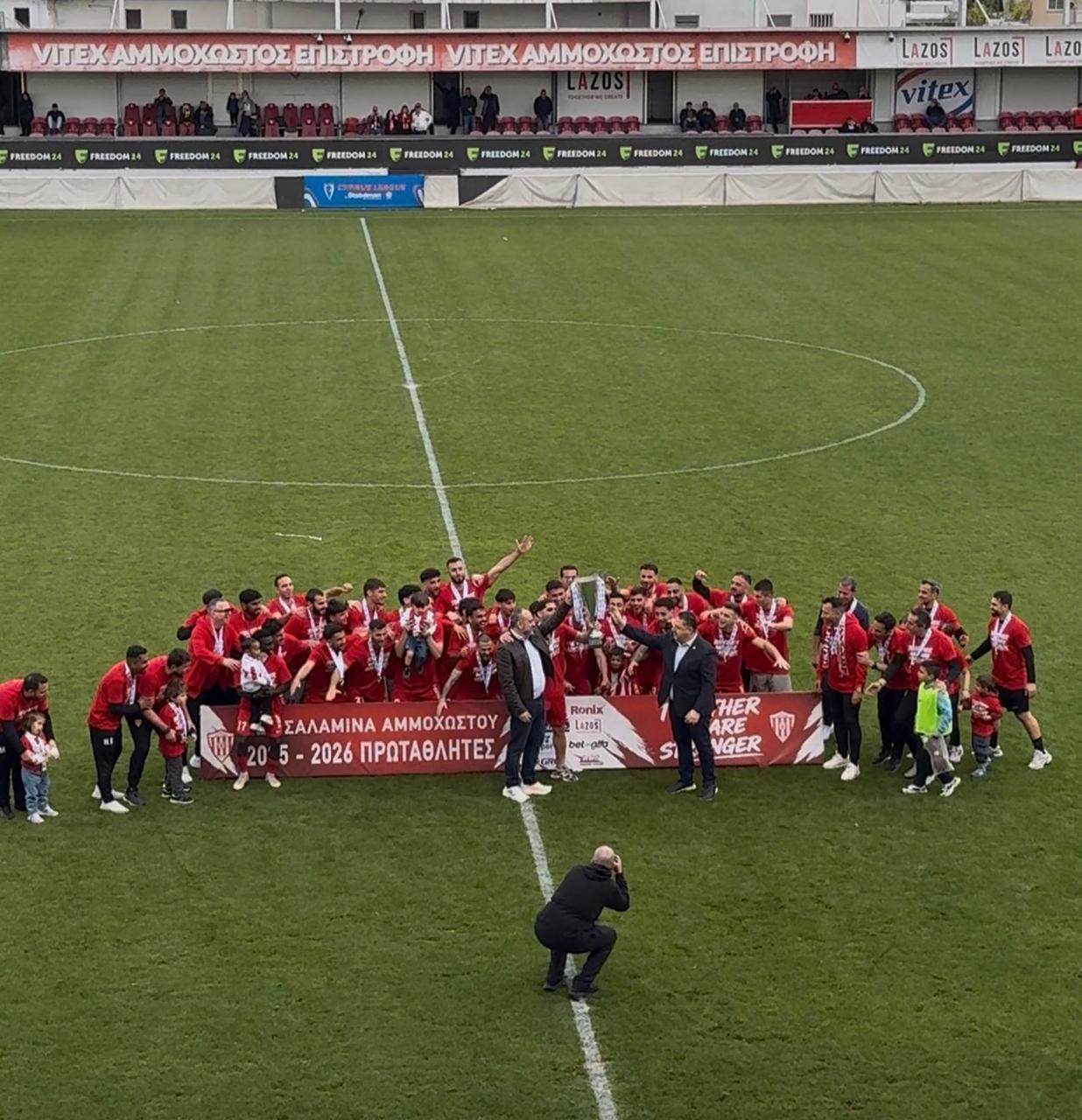
Nea Salamina Famagusta FC lifting the 2025–26 Cypriot Second Division trophy at Ammochostos Epistrofi Stadium.

During the 2019–20 season, the league and cup were disbanded due to the COVID-19 pandemic. Nea Salamis, after the pandemic during the 2020–21 season, ended up being relegated to the second division. During 2021–22, Nea Salamis managed to get promoted back to the first division immediately and stayed until the 2024–25 season. During the 2025-26 Cypriot Second Division, Nea Salamis became champions with 7 matches left during the promotion play-off in the championship.

== Domestic history ==
Season to season of Nea Salamis

Season	Division	Position	Teams	Played	Won	Drawn	Lost	GF	GA	Points	Cypriot Cup	Result
1949–50 (Note: Point System: Win=2 points, Draw=1 point, Lose=0 points)	CAAF	5th	6	10	1	2	7	24	43	5	CAAF Cup; Quarter-finals	–
1950–51	CAAF	4th	6	10	3	2	5	16	38	8	CAAF Cup; Semi-finals	–
1951–52	CAAF	2nd	6	10	6	1	3	20	15	13	CAAF Cup; Quarter-finals	–
1952–53	CAAF	2nd	6	10	6	2	2	26	14	14	CAAF Cup; Final	–
1953–54	Cypriot Second Division	2nd	4	6	4	1	1	23	11	9	Semi-finals	–
1954–55	Cypriot Second Division	1st	7	10	9	1	0	43	6	19	Quarter-finals	Promoted to 1st Division
1955–56	Cypriot First Division	3rd	9	16	7	5	4	31	24	19	–	–
1956–57	Cypriot First Division	5th	9	16	6	2	8	24	25	14	–	–
1957–58	Cypriot First Division	7th	10	18	6	3	9	30	40	15	–	–
1958–59	Not held										Quarter-finals	–
1959–60	Cypriot First Division	6th	11	20	8	4	8	29	27	20	–	–
1960–61 (Note: Point System: Win=3 points, Draw=2 Points, Lose=1 Point)	Cypriot First Division	8th	13	24	10	4	10	47	41	48	–	–
1961–62	Cypriot First Division	5th	13	24	11	6	7	48	36	52	Semi-finals	–
1962–63	Cypriot First Division	4th	12	22	9	8	5	56	43	48	Quarter-finals	–
1963–64	Cypriot First Division	(3)	(11)	(7)	(4)	(2)	(1)	(16)	(10)	(17)	Quarter-finals	–
1963–64	Cypriot First Division	League disbanded									Quarter-finals	–
1964–65	Cypriot First Division	7th	11	20	5	7	8	33	42	37	Semi-finals	–
1965–66	Cypriot First Division	3rd	11	20	12	4	4	39	21	48	Final	–
1966–67	Cypriot First Division	5th	12	22	12	5	5	37	21	51	Quarter-finals	–
1967–68	Cypriot First Division	8th	12	22	8	4	10	47	49	42	First round	–
1968–69	Cypriot First Division	9th	12	22	6	7	9	30	41	41	Semi-finals	–
1969–70	Cypriot First Division	6th	12	22	6	9	7	26	24	43	Quarter-finals	–
1970–71	Cypriot First Division	9th	12	22	7	5	10	24	36	19	Quarter-finals	–
1971–72	Cypriot First Division	8th	12	22	5	10	7	16	22	20	Second round	–
1972–73	Cypriot First Division	13th	14	26	8	4	14	18	28	20	Second round	–
1973–74	Cypriot First Division	13th	14	26	5	8	13	14	30	18	Second round	–
1974–75	Cypriot First Division	11th	14	26	7	3	16	27	51	17	Quarter-finals	–
1975–76	Cypriot First Division	10th	15	28	8	8	12	35	46	24	Quarter-finals	–
1976–77	Cypriot First Division	13th	16	30	6	10	14	36	49	22	Second round	–
1977–78	Cypriot First Division	10th	16	30	8	12	10	43	48	28	Second round	–
1978–79	Cypriot First Division	15th	16	30	10	6	14	42	48	26	Second round	Relegated to 2nd Division
1979–80	Cypriot Second Division	1st	14	26	18	6	2	70	14	42	Second round	Promoted to 1st Division
1980–81	Cypriot First Division	7th	14	26	8	8	10	29	32	24	Quarter-finals	–
1981–82	Cypriot First Division	6th	14	26	8	9	9	34	30	25	Second round	–
1982–83	Cypriot First Division	12th	14	26	6	8	12	28	39	20	Quarter-finals	–
1983–84	Cypriot First Division	11th	14	26	7	8	11	25	41	22	Second round	–
1984–85	Cypriot First Division	10th	14	26	6	12	8	25	29	24	Quarter-finals	–
1985–86	Cypriot First Division	5th	14	26	7	11	8	26	26	25	Second round	–
1986–87	Cypriot First Division	13th	16	30	7	10	13	45	54	24	Semi-finals	–
1987–88	Cypriot First Division	7th	16	30	14	5	11	43	34	33	Quarter-finals	–
1988–89	Cypriot First Division	4th	15	28	11	11	6	51	35	33	Semi-finals	–
1989–90	Cypriot First Division	10th	14	26	6	10	10	26	32	22	Winner	Qualified to UEFA Cup; Winners' Cup
1990–91	Cypriot First Division	6th	14	26	9	9	8	38	31	27	First round	–
1991–92	Cypriot First Division	5th	14	26	11	5	10	45	47	38	Second round	–
1992–93	Cypriot First Division	3rd	14	26	15	3	8	44	28	48	Semi-finals	–
1993–94	Cypriot First Division	9th	14	26	8	8	10	32	31	32	Semi-finals	–
1994–95	Cypriot First Division	3rd	12	33	17	6	10	59	50	57	First round	Qualified to UEFA; Intertoto Cup
1995–96	Cypriot First Division	8th	14	26	10	3	13	37	48	33	Quarter-finals	–
1996–97	Cypriot First Division	8th	14	26	8	10	8	42	36	34	Quarter-finals	Qualified to UEFA; Intertoto Cup
1997–98	Cypriot First Division	8th	14	26	10	1	15	43	59	31	Quarter-finals	–
1998–99	Cypriot First Division	10th	14	26	8	4	14	46	53	28	Semi-finals	–
1999–00	Cypriot First Division	4th	14	26	13	4	9	58	34	43	Second round	Qualified to UEFA; Intertoto Cup
2000–01	Cypriot First Division	12th	14	26	7	6	13	41	47	27	Final	Relegated to 2nd Division
2001–02	Cypriot Second Division	1st	14	26	21	3	2	95	22	66	Quarter-finals	Promoted to 1st Division
2002–03	Cypriot First Division	12th	14	26	6	11	9	39	40	29	Group stage (16)	Relegated to 2nd Division
2003–04	Cypriot Second Division	1st	14	26	21	3	2	68	23	66	Group stage (16)	Promoted to 1st Division
2004–05	Cypriot First Division	6th	14	26	11	3	12	36	40	36	Third round	–
2005–06	Cypriot First Division	6th	14	26	12	5	9	53	48	41	Quarter-finals	–
2006–07	Cypriot First Division	10th	14	26	7	9	10	32	41	30	Fourth round	–
2007–08	Cypriot First Division	13th	14	26	6	6	14	28	54	24	Group stage (8) (Quarter-finals)	Relegated to 2nd Division
2008–09	Cypriot Second Division	3rd	14	26	14	7	5	38	21	49	First round	Promoted to 1st Division
2009–10	Cypriot First Division	13th	14	26	2	8	16	19	45	14	Second round	Relegated to 2nd Division
2010–11	Cypriot Second Division	2nd	14	32	14	13	5	50	25	55	First round	Promoted to 1st Division
2011–12	Cypriot First Division	7th	14	32	11	10	11	39	47	43	Second round	–
2012–13	Cypriot First Division	11th	14	32	8	7	17	27	44	31	Second round	–
2013–14	Cypriot First Division	7th	14	36	17	3	16	43	49	54 (Note: Nea Salamina won 54 points, but because on 17 May 2013 the team were deducted three points by CFA because they failed to meet the financial criteria of UEFA, they finished the season with 51 points.)	Second round	–
2014–15	Cypriot First Division	9th	12	32	9	9	14	31	37	36	Second round	–
2015–16	Cypriot First Division	6th	14	36	9	10	17	44	72	37	Second round	–
2016–17	Cypriot First Division	7th	14	36	12	9	15	33	44	45	Second round	–
2017–18	Cypriot First Division	7th	14	36	14	6	16	53	55	48	Quarter-finals	–
2018–19	Cypriot First Division	5th	12	32	12	8	12	41	47	44	Second round	–
2019–20	Cypriot First Division	(8th)	(12)	(22)	(7)	(4)	(11)	(25)	(36)	(25)	Cup disbanded	–
2019–20	Cypriot First Division	League disbanded									Cup disbanded	–
2020–21	Cypriot First Division	11th	14	40	11	10	19	48	61	43	Quarter-finals	Relegated to 2nd Division
2021–22	Cypriot Second Division	2nd	16	30	20	3	7	59	24	63	First round	Promoted to 1st Division
2022–23	Cypriot First Division	8th	14	40	17	7	16	51	55	58	Quarter-finals	–
2023–24	Cypriot First Division	9th	14	40	14	9	17	52	61	51	Quarter-finals	–
2024–25	Cypriot First Division	13th	14	33	6	8	19	31	62	26	Second round	Relegated to 2nd Division
2025–26	Cypriot Second Division	1st	16	29	24	4	1	56	15	76	Second round	Promoted to 1st Division
2026–27	Cypriot First Division	–	14	–	–	–	–	–	–	–	–	–

Appearances:

- 64 in the Cypriot First Division
- 9 in the Cypriot Second Division
- 4 in the Cyprus Amateur Football Federation

=== Nea Salamis in the Cypriot First Division ===
The table below shows the total stats of Nea Salamis whenever it participates in the Cypriot First Division since its debut on the 1955-56 season until the 2024-25 season. The total number of points stated in the table sums across all seasons participated in the first division, despite changing regulations on point distribution for each game's result. During the 1963-64 and 2019-20 seasons, the championship was abandoned. However, the statistics gathered from those seasons are included in the total amount.

Total in the Cypriot First Division
Seasons	Points	Games	Wins	Draws	Loses	Goals For	Goals Against	Goal Difference
63	2054	1681	561	429	691	2290	2556	-266

Club records include:

- Wins (17) in 1994–95 (33 games) and 2013–14 (36 games). Next is 1992–93, with 15 victories. The fewest wins (two) were during the 2009–10 season.
- Draws (12) in 1977–78 and 1984–85. The 1997–98 season had one draw.
- Defeats: Fewest defeats (four) in 1955–56 and 1965–66 (excluding the 1963–64 season, when the team had one). The most defeats (17) were in 2012–2013 and 2015–2016.
- Most goals (59): 1994–95, with a three-round championship. Next is 1999–2000 (58). The fewest goals (14) were scored in 1973–74.
- The fewest goals against (21) were scored in 1965–66 (when the team had the best defense in the league) and 1966–67 (second-best defense in the league), excluding the shortened 1963–64 season when Nea Salamis had 10 goals against. The team's most goals against (72) came in 2015–16.
- The best goal difference (24) was in 1999–2000; the worst (−28) came in 2015–16.
- The most points earned (57) came in 1994–95 season (33 games), followed by 2013–14 (36 games) with 54 points and 1961–62 with 52 points (22 games, scoring 3–2–1). The fewest points (14) came in 1956–57 and 2009–10.

Source: Stilianou (1998), Gavreilides; Papamoiseos (2001), RSSSF , , , , , , , , , , , , CFA , , , ,

=== Nea Salamis in the Cypriot Cup ===
Nea Salamis has been competing in the Cypriot Cup since 1953–54 and has 68 appearances until 2025–26.

It has reached the following:

- 1 time as a winner (1989–90).
- 2 times as a runner-s up (1965–66, 2000–01).
- 9 times until the semi-finals.
- 23 times until the quarter-finals.

=== Nea Salamis in the Cypriot Second Division ===
The table below shows the total stats of Nea Salamis whenever it participates in the Cypriot Second Division since its debut on the 1953-54 season until the 2025-26 season. The total number of points stated in the table sums across all seasons participated in the second division, despite changing regulations on point distribution for each game's result.

Total in the Cypriot Second Division
Seasons	Points	Games	Wins	Draws	Loses	Goals For	Goals Against	Goal Difference
9	445	211	145	41	25	502	161	341

=== Nea Salamis in the Cyprus Amateur Football Federation ===
The table below shows the total stats of Nea Salamis in the Cyprus Amateur Football Federation from 1949-50 until 1952-53.

Total in the Cyprus Amateur Football Federation
Seasons	Points	Games	Wins	Draws	Loses	Goals For	Goals Against	Goal Difference
4	40	40	16	7	17	86	110	-24

== European history ==
Playing in European competition for the first time in 1990, Nea Salamina was defeated in the first round by Aberdeen FC with an aggregate of 0-5. The team participated during the group stage in 1995 and 1997, playing in the Intertoto Cup, achieving 3rd and 4th place, respectively. In the 2000 UEFA Intertoto Cup, the team reached the second round, with two victories against the Albanian KS Vllaznia Shkodër during the first round with an aggregate of 6-2, but were eliminated during the second round by Austria Wien, with 1-3 in aggregate.

Season	Cup	Round	Club	Home	Away	Aggregate	Source
1990–91	UEFA Cup Winners' Cup	First round	(Scotland) Aberdeen F.C.	0–2	0–3	0-5	
1995	UEFA Intertoto Cup	Group stage	(Greece) OFI	---	1–2	3rd Place	
1995	UEFA Intertoto Cup	Group stage	(Estonia) JK Tervis Pärnu	2–0	---	3rd Place	
1995	UEFA Intertoto Cup	Group stage	(Montenegro) FK Budućnost; Podgorica	---	1–1	3rd Place	
1995	UEFA Intertoto Cup	Group stage	(Germany) Bayer Leverkusen	0–2	---	3rd Place	
1997	UEFA Intertoto Cup	Group stage	(Switzerland) FC Lausanne	---	1–4	4th Place	
1997	UEFA Intertoto Cup	Group stage	(Northern Ireland) Ards F.C.	4–1	---	4th Place	
1997	UEFA Intertoto Cup	Group stage	(Belgium) Royal Antwerp F.C.	---	0–4	4th Place	
1997	UEFA Intertoto Cup	Group stage	(France) AJ Auxerre	1–10	---	4th Place	
2000	UEFA Intertoto Cup	First round	(Albania) KS Vllaznia Shkodër	4–1	2–1	6-2	
2000	UEFA Intertoto Cup	Second round	Austria Wien	1–0	0–3	1-3	

== Players ==
As of 15 September 2026

Note: Flags indicate national team as defined under FIFA eligibility rules; some limited exceptions apply. Players may hold more than one non-FIFA nationality.

No.	Pos.	Nation	Player
1	GK	ESP	Alberto Varo
4	DF	CYP	Panagiotis Artymatas
5	DF	CYP	Alexandros Michail
6	MF	CYP	Georgios Christodoulou
7	FW	FRA	Samuel Grandsir
8	MF	ESP	José Artiles
9	FW	ESP	Darío Poveda
10	MF	GRE	Christos Giousis
12	DF	CYP	Andreas Dimitriou (on loan from Aris Limassol)
13	GK	BUL	Daniel Stefanov
16	GK	UKR	Denys Vakulyk
17	FW	GBS	Aldair
19	FW	POL	Karol Angielski

No.	Pos.	Nation	Player
24	DF	GRE	Vasilios Lampropoulos
25	MF	CYP	Konstantinos Ilia
27	MF	FRA	Alois Confais
29	DF	FRA	Florent Hanin
30	DF	CYP	Andreas Panagiotou Filiotis
37	FW	GHA	Braydon Manu
55	DF	ESP	Sergio González
63	GK	HUN	Dániel Kovács
71	MF	CYP	Giannis Gerolemou
88	MF	ESP	Jordi Quintillà (on loan from St. Gallen)
89	FW	CYP	Panagiotis Louka
93	MF	FRA	Brahim Konaté
—	MF	NGR	Johnson Eboh (on loan from Kifisia)

=== Out on loan ===
As of 23 August 2026

Note: Flags indicate national team as defined under FIFA eligibility rules; some limited exceptions apply. Players may hold more than one non-FIFA nationality.

No.	Pos.	Nation	Player
—	DF	CYP	Giorgos Viktoros (on loan at Omonia Nicosia)
—	MF	CYP	Andreas Mavroudis (on loan at Omonia Nicosia)

== Managers ==
- (Cyprus) Michael Daniel Sialic (1948–49)
- (Cyprus) Ruben Perperian (1949)
- (England) Gkilli (1950)
- (Cyprus) Kostakis Antoniades (1950–51)
- (Cyprus) Kostas Eleftheriou (1951)
- (England) Henderson (1952)
- (Cyprus) Kostakis Antoniades (1952–53)
- (Cyprus) Costas Vasileiou (1953–55)
- (Cyprus) Kostas Tsiges (1955–57)
- (Hungary) Gyula Zsengellér (1957–59)
- (Cyprus) Nikis Georgiou (1959–61)
- (Cyprus) Costas Vasileiou (1961–62)
- (Cyprus) Nikis Georgiou (1962–64)
- (Cyprus) Costas Vasileiou (1964–65)
- (Cyprus) Kostakis Antoniades (1965–67)
- (People's Republic of Bulgaria) Stoyan Petrov (1967–68)
- (Cyprus) Andreas Fokkis (1968–69)
- (Cyprus) Pambos Avraamides (1969–71)
- (Socialist Federal Republic of Yugoslavia) Sima Milovanov (1971–73)
- (Cyprus) Maurikios Aspros (1973–74)
- (Cyprus) Maurikios Aspros (1974–75) (Limassol)
- (Cyprus) Andreas Konteatis/ (Cyprus) Nikis Georgiou (1974–75) (Larnaca)
- (Cyprus) Kostakis Antoniades (1975–77)
- (People's Republic of Bulgaria) Spiro Debarski (1977–80)
- (Czechoslovakia) Jozef Jankech (1980–82)
- (Cyprus) Andreas Mouskallis (1983)
- (Czech Republic) Mario Buzek (1983–84)
- (Czechoslovakia) Milan Máčala (1984–86)
- (Cyprus) Andreas Mouskallis (1986–90)
- (Bulgaria) Bozhil Kolev (1990–91)
- (Poland) Jerzy Engel (1991–94)
- (Federal Republic of Yugoslavia) Momčilo Vukotić (1994-17 May 1995)
- (Bulgaria) Boris Nikolov (1 June 1995 – 12 December 1995)
- (Poland) Jerzy Engel (28 December 1995 – 17 May 1996)
- (Bosnia and Herzegovina) Slobodan Karalić (14 May 1996 – 6 January 1998)
- (Cyprus) Lucas Kotrofos (6 January 1998 – 16 March 1998)
- (Australia) Michael Urukalo (16 March 1998 – 10 May 1998)
- (Cyprus) Andreas Mouskallis (13 May 1998 – 1 May 1999)
- (Federal Republic of Yugoslavia) Slobodan Vučeković (13 May 1999 – 26 February 2001)
- (Federal Republic of Yugoslavia) Zlatko Krmpotić (27 February 2001 – 18 March 2001)
- (Cyprus) Andreas Kissonergis (19 March 2001 – 31 May 2001)
- (Cyprus) Takis Antoniou (10 June 2001 – 7 January 2003)
- (Bulgaria) Georgi Vasilev (11 January 2003 – 14 March 2003)
- (Cyprus) Panicos Orphanides (16 March 2003 – 6 April 2005)
- (Hungary) Imre Gellei (10 June 2005 – 24 October 2005)
- (Cyprus) Andreas Michaelides (24 October 2005 – 5 November 2006)
- (Cyprus) Nikos Andronikou (7 November 2006 – 4 May 2007)
- (Greece) Georgios Kostikos (7 May 2007 – 28 October 2007)
- (Cyprus) Panicos Orphanides (7 November 2007 – 5 November 2008)
- (Cyprus) Savvas Constantinou (17 November 2008 – 31 December 2008)
- (Cyprus) Michael Hadjipieris (5 January 2009 – 20 April 2009)
- (Hungary) Attila Supka (21 April 2009 – 1 November 2009)
- (Bosnia and Herzegovina) Mirko Mihić (3 November 2009 – 22 December 2009)
- (Israel) Nir Klinger (30 December 2009 – April 2010)
- (Bosnia and Herzegovina) Nedim Tutić (21 April 2010 – 17 October 2010)
- (Cyprus) Stephen Constantine (18 October 2010 – 31 May 2012)
- (Cyprus) Nicos Andreou (28 June 2012 – 18 November 2012)
- (North Macedonia) Mirsad Jonuz (21 November 2012 – 31 May 2013)
- (Greece) Apostolos Charalampidis (19 June 2013 – 7 September 2013)
- (Greece) Dimitris Kalaitzidis (11 September 2013 – 15 January 2014)
- (Cyprus) Neophytos Larkou (16 January 2014 – 16 December 2014)
- (Cyprus) Nicos Panayiotou (16 December 2014 – 4 May 2015)
- (Cyprus) Floros Nicolaou (5 May 2015 – 6 June 2015) Caretaker
- (Netherlands) Jan de Jonge (19 June 2015 – 22 April 2016)
- (Romania) Eugen Neagoe (7 May 2016 – 19 September 2016)
- (Greece) Staikos Vergetis (20 September 2016 – 6 March 2017)
- (Portugal) António Conceição (16 March 2017 – 23 May 2017)
- (Cyprus) Liasos Louka (6 June 2017 – 17 October 2017)
- (Greece) Savvas Poursaitidis (18 October 2017 – 22 May 2020)
- (Cyprus) Pambos Christodoulou (4 June 2020 – 30 October 2020)
- (Cyprus) Savvas Damianou (30 October 2020 – 14 March 2021)
- (Cyprus) Chrysis Michael (15 March 2021 – 20 April 2021)
- (Cyprus) Constantinos Mina (20 April 2021 – 6 July 2021)
- (Cyprus) Nikodimos Papavasiliou (9 July 2021 – 27 January 2022)
- (Cyprus) Savvas Poursaitidis (27 January 2022 – 16 May 2023)
- (Cyprus) Christodoulos Christodoulou (30 May 2023 – 6 October 2024)
- (North Macedonia) Čedomir Janevski (11 October 2024 – 8 January 2025)
- (Cyprus) Savvas Poursaitidis (9 January 2025 – 3 March 2025)
- (Venezuela) Héctor González (4 March 2025 – 9 May 2025)
- (Spain) Angel Lopez (17 June 2025 – 10 November 2026)
- (Cyprus) Sofronis Avgousti (12 November 2026 – )

== Former players ==
Players with more than 100 appearances with the team:

- (Cyprus) Adamou Bangelis (1986–98)
- (Cyprus) Andreou Artemis (1986–98)
- (Cyprus) Andreou Pampis (1987–97/1999–2003)
- (Cyprus) Angelidis Aggelos (1967–78)
- (Cyprus) Aristotelous Vasos (1950–64)
- (Cyprus) Chrisanthos N. (1983–90)
- (Cyprus) Christofi Christakis (1978–91)
- (Cyprus) Christofi Kiriakos (1959–68)
- (Cyprus) Christofi Varnavas (1962–72)
- (Cyprus) Dimitriou Pantelis (1991–98)
- (Cyprus) Elia Elias (1971–82)
- (Cyprus) Elia Elias (1983–96)
- (Cyprus) Fokkis Andreas (1952–65)
- (Cyprus) Fokkis Pasxalis (1966–77)
- (Cyprus) Giasas Andreas (1959–66)
- (Cyprus) Ioannidis Andreas (1988–09)
- (Cyprus) Ioannou Giannos (1986–98)
- (Cyprus) Ioannou Kokos (1972–85)
- (Cyprus) K. Nouros (1975–83)
- (Cyprus) Kakousis F. (1975–84)
- (Cyprus) Karaolis Andreas (1966–73)
- (Cyprus) Kiriakou Moisis (1973–85)
- (Cyprus) Kokos Elia (1991–98)
- (Cyprus) Konteatis Andreas (1962–72)
- (Cyprus) Kotrofos Sofoklis (1959–72)
- (Cyprus) Koulapis Loukas (1976–86)
- (Cyprus) Koungas P. (1970–79)
- (Cyprus) Koureas Kiriakos (1964–70)
- (Cyprus) Lambros (1978–87)
- (Cyprus) Lellos Koullapis (1976–86)
- (Cyprus) Loukas Kotrofos (1974–80)
- (Cyprus) Malos Michalakis (1966–75)
- (Cyprus) Mantzouras Micahlis (1975–89)
- (Cyprus) Marangos Takis (1979–89)
- (Cyprus) Mavros Christakis (1978–92)
- (Cyprus) Mavrou Vasos (1985–97)
- (Cyprus) Michailides Michalakis (1969–75)
- (Cyprus) Mitsios D. (1973–79)
- (Cyprus) Mouskallis Andreas (1967–74)
- (Cyprus) Nicolaou Floros (1979–91/1994–95)
- (Cyprus) Nicolaou Nikos (1991–01)
- (England) Nigel McNeill (1987–91)
- (Cyprus) Okkas Ioannis (1993–97)^{1}
- (Cyprus) Orfanidis Michalis (1959–67)
- (Cyprus) Pitsiaoulos Nikos (1955–68)
- (Cyprus) Porfiriou T. (1993–98)
- (Cyprus) Psaras Elissaios (1967–78)
- (Cyprus) Sialos Michalis (1959–68)
- (Cyprus) Sofokleous Loukas (1961–79)
- (Cyprus) Stavrou Savvas (1954–68)
- (Cyprus) Theofanous Petros (1972–80)
- (Cyprus) Thomas A. (1972–79)
- (Cyprus) Tsikelis Kipros (1987–96)

For more former players, see Nea Salamis FC players.

^{1}Less than 100 appearances, but he started his career at Nea Salamina FC and later became the player with more appearances for Cyprus national football team than any other player in history.
Main source: Stilianou, 1998

== Relations with Turkish Cypriots ==
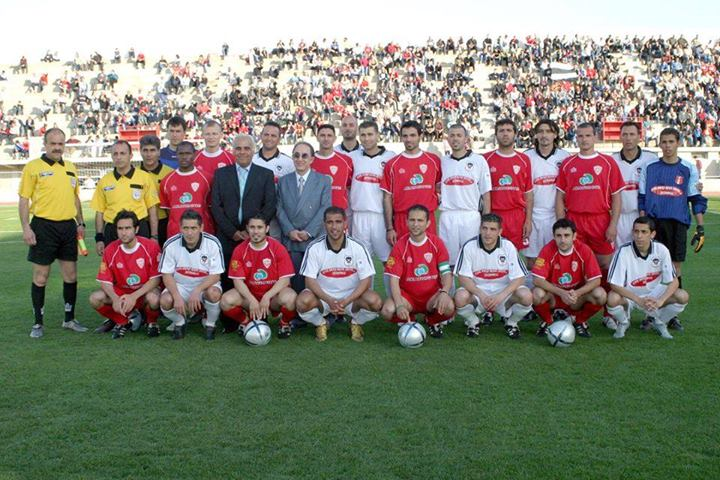
Nea Salamis Famagusta FC played a friendly against the Turkish Cypriot players Yenicami Ağdelen S.K. at Ammochostos Epistrofi Stadium; it was the first match between Greek and Turkish Cypriot clubs in 50 years.

Since its founding Nea Salamina sought to develop friendly relations with the Turkish Cypriots in Famagusta, and Turkish Cypriots (including Siekkeris, Nita and Moustafa) played for the club during the early 1950s. When the team joined the CFA, it played against Turkish teams (including Demir Sports, Gençlik Gücü and the Mağusa Türk Gücü) in the second division. When Turkish Cypriot clubs began withdrawing from tournaments hosted by the CFA in late 1955, the club tried to convince them to continue and Turkish players remained welcome in Nea Salamina. In 1962 Kallikas was transferred to the club, and in 1970 Neziak (of Turkish origin) was also transferred. In 2004 Turkish Cypriots Imam and Oulousoi were transferred to Nea Salamina, the first Turkish Cypriot footballers in the CAF in thirty years.

On 26 March 2005 Nea Salamina played a friendly against the Turkish Cypriot Yenicami at Ammochostos Epistrofi Stadium, defeating them 6–0; it was the first match between Greek and Turkish Cypriot clubs in 50 years. About 2,500 fans sat together in the stands, and the match was attended by political leaders, local sports authorities and representatives of the Church of Cyprus.

== Women's football ==
In 2006, Nea Salamina organized a women's football team. In its first season (2006–07) in the Cypriot First Division, the team finished third and qualified for the Cypriot Women's Cup (losing 3–1 to AEK Kokkinochorion at GSP Stadium). That year it won the Super Cup, beating AEK Kokkinochorion 2–1 at Ammochostos Epistrofi Stadium in Larnaca.

In 2007–08, the team finished second. In 2008–09 (when it also finished second), it forfeited the championship game (at home, against Apollon Limassol) when the referee stopped the match due spectator overcrowding.

In 2008–09, Skevi Antoniou was leading scorer in the Cypriot First Division with 64 goals. The women's team disbanded in 2010 for economic reasons.

== Honours ==
League

- Cypriot Second Division
  - Champions (5): 1954–55, 1979–80, 2001–02, 2003–04, 2025–26
  - Runners-up (3): 1953–54, 2010–11, 2021–22

Cup

- Cypriot Cup
  - Winners (1): 1989–90
  - Runners-up (2): 1965–66, 2000–01
- Cypriot Super Cup
  - Winners (1): 1990

== Gallery ==
Nea Salamina FC fans
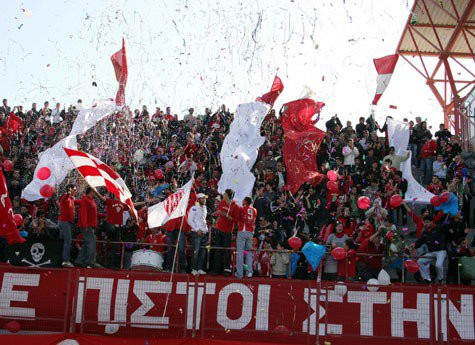
Nea Salamina Famagusta FC fans at Ammochostos Epistrofi Stadium in a game against Alki Larnaca F.C. in season 2011–12.

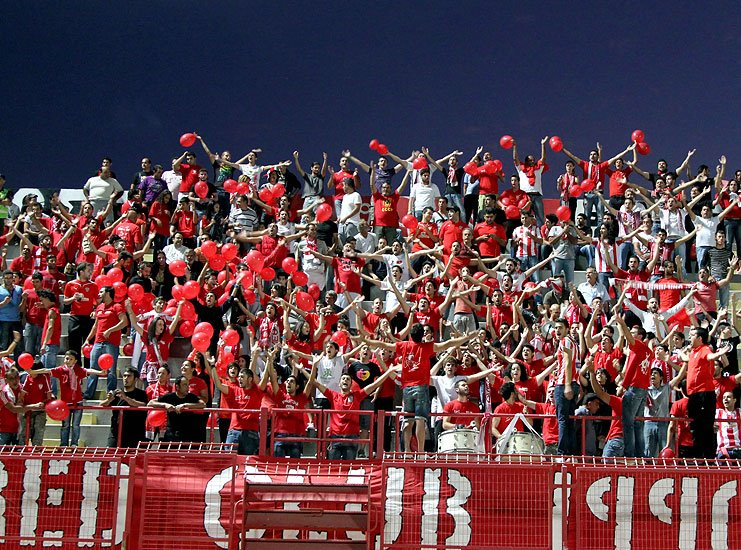
Nea Salamina Famagusta FC fans at Ammochostos Epistrofi Stadium in a game against AEK Larnaca FC in season 2009–10.

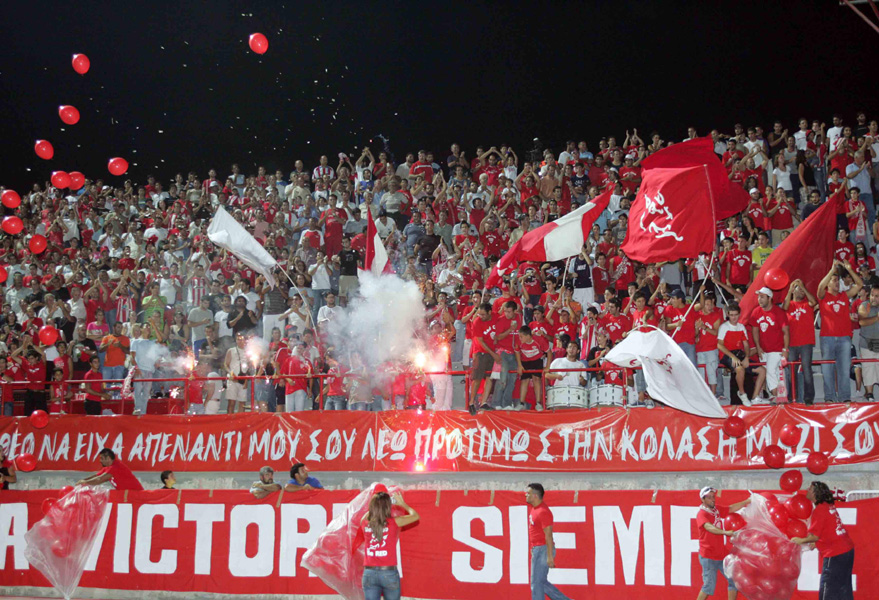
Nea Salamina Famagusta FC fans at Ammochostos Epistrofi Stadium in a game against Enosis Neon Paralimni FC in season 2006–07.

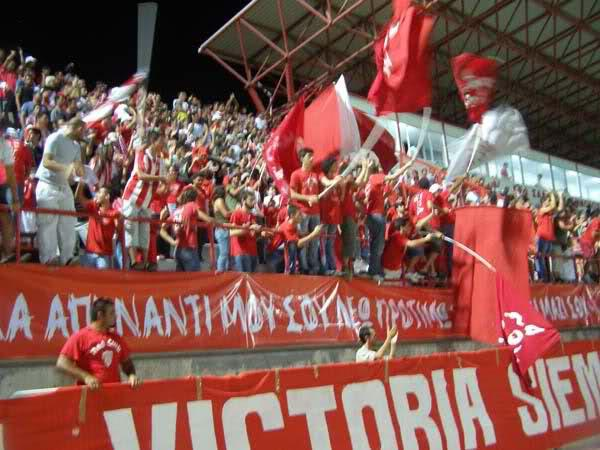
Nea Salamina Famagusta FC fans at Ammochostos Epistrofi Stadium in a game against AEP Paphos FC in season 2006–07.

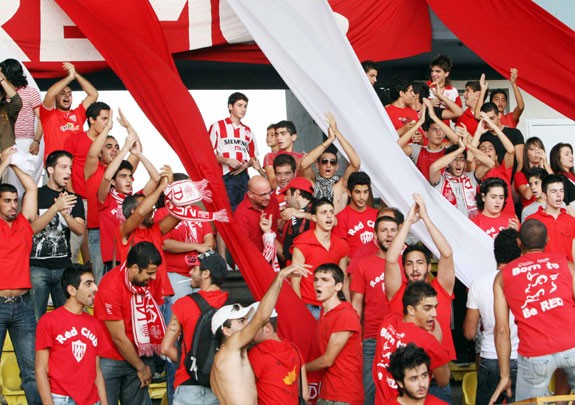
Nea Salamina Famagusta FC fans at Tsirion Stadium in a game against Aris Limassol F.C. in season 2010–11.

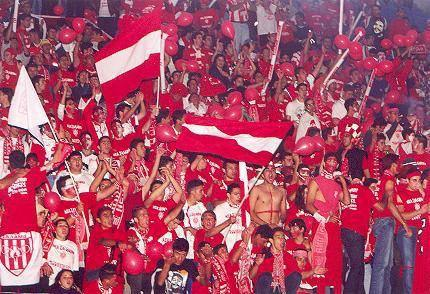
Nea Salamina Famagusta FC fans at Cypriot Cup Final 2000–01 at GSP Stadium.

== Bibliography ==
- Gavreilides, Michalis; Papamoiseos, Stelios (2001). Ένας αιώνας Κυπριακό ποδόσφαιρο [One century Cypriot football] (in Greek). Nicosia: The writer. ISBN 9963-8720-1-8.
- Meletiou, Giorgos (2011). Κυπριακό ποδόσφαιρο 1900–1960 [Cypriot Football 1900–1960] (in Greek). Nicosia: Power Publishing. ISBN 978-9963-688-87-6.
- Stilianou, Pampos; Georgiou, Neofitos (1988). Νέα Σαλαμίνα, 40 χρόνια πρωτοπόρας αθλητικής πορείας [Nea Salamina, 40 years pioneering sports history] (in Greek). Cyprus: Nea Salamis Famagusta.
- Stilianou, Pampos (1998). 50 χρόνια Νέα Σαλαμίνα 1948–1998 [50 years Nea Salamina 1948–1998] (in Greek). Cyprus: Nea Salamis Famagusta. ISBN 9963-8370-0-X.
- Stephanidis, Giorgos (2003). 40 χρόνια κυπριακές ομάδες στην Ευρώπη [40 years Cypriot teams in Europe] (in Greek). Nicosia: Haravgi. ISBN 9963-8841-1-3.
