= Cyprus Amateur Football Federation =

The Cyprus Amateur Football Federation (CAFF) (Greek: Κυπριακή Ερασιτεχνική Ποδοσφαιρική Ομοσπονδία) was founded in 1948 by leftist Greek Cypriot actors and athletes. The league, which divided Cypriot football into two federations for five years, held its own championships and cup competitions.

== Background ==
When the CFFA was founded, Greece was in political turmoil due to the conflict between rightists and leftists in the Greek Civil War. The conflict in Greece moved to Cyprus, affecting sports as well as politics. Most sports factors at the time were occupied with politics.

In Famagusta, the GSE (Gymnastic Club Evagoras) and Anorthosis were the only clubs involved in sports. Both clubs had top-class leftist athletes who were restricted for political reasons. In early 1947, Famagusta leftists believed that there was room for an apolitical federation in the city for working class players. Nea Salamis Famagusta FC was founded on March 7, 1948. Similar bias against leftist athletes existed in other Cypriot cities, and Alki Larnaca FC was founded in Larnaca on 10 April of that year.

One month later, before the Cypriot track and field games in May, the Hellenic Amateur Athletic Association (SEGAS) asked the clubs to declare their "nationalist beliefs". Nearly all the clubs and rightist athletes signed the declaration; the only holdout was the Kinyras club in Paphos, which was then barred from the games. Leftist athletes, including GSE champions Antonis Totsis and Nikis Georgiou, refused to repudiate their ideological beliefs. the Although the GSE asked Totsis and Georgiou to apologize, they maintained that sport should be separate from politics. Leftist athletes also supported the Kinyras club in Paphos, and their clubs experienced retaliation.

At a general meeting, Gymnastic Club Zeno (GSZ) banned Alki Larnaca FC from the GSZ Stadium; a similar proposal excluding Turks and Catholics was rejected. The GSZ prohibited membership renewal and stadium use if members did not sign a declaration of allegiance to the Greek government. The Orfeas Nicosia club was founded in May 1948.

That month, APOEL FC sent a telegram to SEGAS for the national games greeting the athletes and hoping for an end to dissent. Leftists protested the telegram's partisan tone, and five APOEL FC athletes (Lympouris, Tsialis, Gogakis, Xatzivasileiou, and Christodoulou) were indefinitely suspended. APOEL FC defectors founded AC Omonia in Nicosia in June, and AS Kyrenia was founded in Kyrenia.

== CAFF founding ==
Leftist clubs moved towards the establishment of a new football association, since the Cyprus Football Association (CFA) did not recognize the new clubs. The Cyprus Amateur Football Federation was founded in December 1948. The new federation organized leagues and cup competitions, drawing thousands of young fans. The CAFF championship attracted more fans than that of the CFA. Six clubs participated in the CAFF: Nea Salamina in Famagusta, AC Omonia and Orpheus in Nicosia, Alki in Larnaca, AMOL in Limassol (renamed Antaeus in 1951) and Neos Asteras in Morphou.

== Consolidation of Cypriot football ==
The CAFF clubs favored the consolidation of Cypriot football, and unsuccessfully tried for three years to join the CFA. Two competing football leagues created financial and logistical problems and hampered the development of Cypriot football. The separate leagues also symbolized segregation and discrimination. The foundation for the unification of Cypriot football began with the publication of the sports newspaper Athlitiki, which started a crusade for consolidation in December 1952. Although the CFA opposed consolidation, nearly all the top players supported consolidation during the summer of 1953. In August of that year, Nea Salamina, Omonia, Alki and Antaeus submitted a joint application to the CFA for membership in the Cypriot First Division; on 19 September, the association accepted Nea Salamis, Omonia and Antaeus. Alki and Orpheus joined a year later. The CFA decided that one club would join the First Division and two would play in the Cypriot Second Division. The CAFF decided that Omonia would join the First Division and Nea Salamina and Antaeus would join the Second Division.

== Clubs ==
Nea Salamis, the first club (founded on 7 March 1948), continues to play successfully. After the CAFF disbanded, it was incorporated into the second division. It has won titles, and now plays in the first division. Alki, the second club, was founded on 10 April 1948. In 1954, the CFA accepted Alki in the first division. They disbanded in 2014.

Orfeas Nicosia was founded in May 1948, and was incorporated into the second division after the CAFF dissolved. It remains a lower-league club (currently in the STOK Elite Division, fourth in the league system. Omonia, founded on 4 June 1948, won the greatest number of CAFF championships and cups. Incorporated by the CFA into the first division in 1953, it remains one of the most successful Cypriot clubs.

The Limassol Athletic Musician Group, founded in 1944, was renamed Antaeus Limassol in 1951. After winning the 1953 championship, it joined the CFA in the second division. The club no longer exists. New Star Morphou, founded in 1944, changed its name to AEM Morphou. They dissolved in 1991. The Athletic Club of Kyrenia was founded in 1948 by Andreas Cariolou, a founding member of the CAFF. In 1950, it dissolved its football division.

== Tournaments ==
=== 1948–49 ===
Omonia won the championship.

=== 1949–50 ===
Position	Team	G	W	D	L	GF	GA	GD	P
1.	Omonia	10	9	1	0	38	8	+30	19
2.	A.M.O.L. Limassol	10	5	3	2	33	18	+15	13
3.	Alki	10	4	3	3	30	19	+11	11
4.	Orfeas	10	2	5	3	18	22	-4	9
5.	Nea Salamis	10	1	2	7	24	43	-19	5
6.	New Star Morphou	10	2	0	8	14	47	-33	4

=== 1950–51 ===
Position	Team	G	W	D	L	GF	GA	GD	P
1.	Omonia	10	10	0	0	52	11	+39	20
2.	Alki	10	5	3	2	24	16	+8	12
3.	A.M.O.L. Limassol	10	4	2	4	23	18	+5	10
4.	Nea Salamis	10	3	2	5	16	38	-22	8
5.	New Star Morphou	10	2	1	7	16	34	-18	5
6.	Orfeas	10	1	3	6	12	26	-14	5

=== 1951–52 ===
Position	Team	G	W	D	L	GF	GA	GD	P
1.	Omonia	10	7	3	0	40	9	+31	17
2.	Nea Salamis	10	6	1	3	20	15	+5	13
3.	Antaeus Limassol	10	5	2	3	28	13	+15	12
4.	Alki	10	5	1	4	36	27	+9	11
5.	Orfeas	10	2	1	7	18	39	-21	5
6.	New Star Morphou	10	1	0	9	15	54	-39	2

=== 1952–53 ===
Position	Team	G	W	D	L	GF	GA	GD	P
1.	Antaeus Limassol	10	7	1	2	37	12	+25	15
2.	Nea Salamis	10	6	2	2	26	14	+12	14
3.	Omonia	10	6	0	4	30	19	+11	12
4.	Alki	10	4	0	6	21	27	-6	8
5.	Orfeas	10	3	1	6	14	21	-7	7
6.	New Star Morphou	10	1	4	5	9	34	-25	6

G = Games, W = Wins, D=Draws, L = Losses, GF = Goals for, GA = Goals against, GD = Goal difference, P = Points

== Champions and cup winners ==
CAFF Champions
Year	Club
1948–49	Omonia
1949–50	Omonia
1950–51	Omonia
1951–52	Omonia
1952–53	Antaeus Limassol

CAFF Cup Winners
Year	Winner	Score	Finalist	Stadium
1948–49	Omonia	6–1	New Star Morphou	Stadium Gooul Nikosia
1949–50	Omonia	2–1	A.M.O.L. Limassol	Stadium Gooul Nikosia
1950–51	Omonia	13–1	New Star Morphou	Stadium Gooul Nikosia
1951–52	Omonia	2–0	Antaeus Limassol	Stadium Gooul Nikosia
1952–53	Omonia	2–0	Nea Salamis	Stadium Gooul Nikosia

== Sources ==
- Gavreilides, Michalis; Papamoiseos, Stelios (2001). One century Cypriot football (in Greek). Nicosia: The writer. ISBN 978-9963-8720-1-5.
- Meletiou, Giorgos (2011). Cypriot Football 1900–1960 (in Greek). Nicosia: Power Publishing. ISBN 978-9963-688-87-6.
- Stilianou, Pampos; Georgiou, Neofitos (1988). Nea Salamina, 40 years pioneering sports history (in Greek). Cyprus: Nea Salamina Famagusta.
- Stilianou, Pampos (1998). 50 years Nea Salamina 1948–1998 (in Greek). Cyprus: Nea Salamina Famagusta. ISBN 978-9963-8370-0-7.
