= Nea Salamis Famagusta =

Sports club based in Ammochostos, Cyprus

- Full name: Athletic Club Nea Salamis Famagusta; Αθλητικό Σωματείο Νέα Σαλαμίς Αμμοχώστου
- Founded: 1948; 78 years ago
- Chairman: Paris Antreou
- Website: https://neasalamina.com/

Nea Salamis Famagusta or Nea Salamina Famagusta (Greek: Νέα Σαλαμίνα Αμμοχώστου) is a Cypriot sports club based in Ammochostos (also known by its romanized name, Famagusta), Cyprus. The club is named after Salamis (or Salamina), an ancient city near present-day Famagusta. Nea Salamis Famagusta fields teams in men's football and volleyball, and formerly fielded teams in women's football, track and field, water sports and table tennis.

Since the 1974 Turkish occupation of northern Cyprus, Nea Salamina has been a refugee team based in Larnaca. The men's football team, founded in 1948 and based at Ammochostos Stadium in Larnaka, is the club's oldest; its high points were winning the 1990 Cypriot and Cypriot Super Cups.

The men's volleyball team is one of the most successful teams in Cyprus. With 9 championships, 8 cups and 8 Super Cups it is the second team in trophies. The ground of the team is in Limassol, the indoor athletic arena Spyros Kyprianou Athletic Center.

== History ==
=== Early years ===
Nea Salamis was founded at the time of the Greek Civil War. The situation in Greece affected Cyprus, influencing politics and sport; most athletes were also involved in politics. At that time, Famagusta had two sports clubs: the Evagoras Gymnastics Association, or GSE, (Greek: Γυμναστικός Σύλλογος Ευαγόρας) and the Anorthosis Famagusta FC. GSE had many leftist athletes (some of the best in Cyprus) on its roster, and many of Anorthosis' players were also leftists. In the right-wing political climate of the time, both clubs began restricting the admission of leftist players or denying them promotion. Additionally, Anorthosis was hosting at their clubhouse the right-wing Cypriot National Party. In early 1947 a group of leftists, members and of GSE and Anorthosis and some other people from Famagusta agreed on the need for another sport club which would appeal to all, regardless of political affiliation.

On 14 February 1948 a decision was made to establish the club, and the New Salamis sports club was formed on 7 March 1948 as the first leftist athletic club in Cyprus. After the club was founded, demand was high to join. The football team was not strong at that time, since most of the players were untalented.

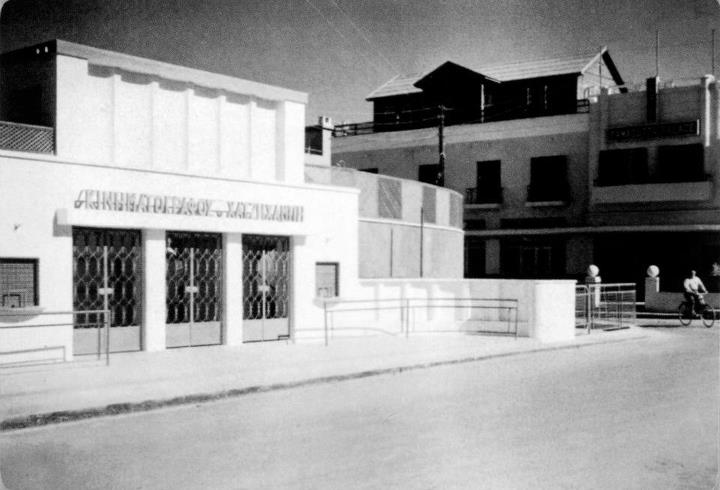
Cinema Hadjichambi, where Nea Salamina Famagusta was founded in Famagusta in 1948

On 8 March 1948, the newspaper Democratis reported the club's establishment in a story titled, "A Progressive Movement in Varosha":

Today at 11 a.m. in Hadjihambis theater the founding convention of a new sport club in our city, New Salamina took place. The board of directors consisted of Messrs. Andrew Paschalides, Georgio Fano, doctor, and Kostas Eleftheriou. Mr. G. Fanos stressed that the most progressive city of the island, Famagusta, hasn't had a political free sport club. He also emphasized the association's program as leading the city in cultural and sportive terms and invited all professionals and amateurs to join the new club.

Nine board members were elected:

- Andreas Paschalidis (Chair)
- George Fanos (Vice-president)
- Kostas Eleftheriou (General Secretary)
- Michael Daniel Sialis (Treasurer)
- Antonis Totsis (Collector)
- Lycurgus Archontides (Football head)
- Nikos Kokkinos (Football head)
- Panagiotis Kalogirou (Track head)

=== Name ===
The new club was named "Nea Salamis", based on a suggestion by Evagoras Lanitis. Lanitis came to the GSΕ stadium during Pancypriot games, and said Anorthosis should be renamed "Salamis" in honor of ancient Salamis. A club founder remembered the suggestion, proposed it and it was adopted as "Athletic Club 'Nea Salamis' Famagusta" (Greek: ΑΘΛΗΤΙΚΟΝ ΣΩΜΑΤΕΙΟΝ "ΝΕΑ ΣΑΛΑΜΙΣ" ΑΜΜΟΧΩΣΤΟΥ; nea means "new" in Greek).

=== Teams ===
Many people soon joined the new club, creating track and football teams for young athletes. Although the club had a track team, the football department coordinated all events. The first Nea Salamis track meet was the Famagusta races on 25 March 1948 at the GSE stadium, at which the club was victorious. Participants included Nikis Georgiou, Panayiotis Kalogirou, Antonis Totsis, Koumis Kkeses, Kostas Manoli, Nikos Kokkinos and Christofi Tsiakkiros. The track team was successful because GSE's top track athletes joined Nea Salamis, but the football team was not strong because few players from Anorthosis had joined Nea Salamis.

=== Expulsion from GSE Stadium and founding of CAFF ===
Before the May 1948 Pancyprian Games, the Hellenic Amateur Athletic Association (SEGAS) asked all sports clubs in Cyprus to publicly support the rightists in the Greek Civil War, espousing "nationalist beliefs" and condemning the leftists. The rightist athletic clubs and athletes signed the statement; the only club which refused was the "Kinyras" Paphos Gymnastic Association, which was excluded from the games. The leftist athletes, opposed to the declaration by the clubs, refused to sign the statement. Among the first athletes who reacted were GSE champions Antonis Totsis (Greek: Αντώνης Τότσης) and Nikis Georgiou (Νικής Γεωργίου). Although the GSE asked the athletes to apologize, both insisted that sports should remain separate from politics. Totsis and Georgiou also decided to support the "Kinyras" Paphos Gymnastic Association if the decision excluding it from the Pancyprian Games was unchanged. They held to their position, and although the GSE was favored in the games it finished third. Nea Salamis did not participate in the Pancyprian Games, and the GSE president informed the club by mail that it was barred from the GSE Stadium. Nea Salamis hadn' t stadium for the new season.

Leftist athletes were also persecuted in other Cypriot cities. In Larnaca, Alki Larnaca F.C. was founded in April 1948; the following month, the Gymnastic Club Zeno (GSZ) banned Alki from using its GSZ Stadium; a similar proposal excluding Turks and Catholics was rejected. At the same meeting, GSZ members amended its constitution to prohibit the future enrollment of new members unless they signed a declaration that "they espouse Hellenic nationalistic ideals". This excluded leftist athletes from becoming members or using its stadium. In May, Orfeas Nicosia was founded in Nicosia; that month, APOEL F.C. sent a telegram to SEGAS with "cordial brotherly greetings to the entire Greek youth athletes" for the National Games and hoping for an end to intra-nation mutiny. APOEL asked its members and athletes to sign a declaration supporting the telegram's content. Leftist APOEL members and athletes "intra-nation mutiny" a political challenge issued by the club, and distanced themselves from the statement. The Cypriot press created a hostile climate with articles and commentary. This was followed by an indefinite suspension of five APOEL athletes, who founded AC Omonia in June 1948 with former APOEL members. After that, AS Kyrenia was founded.

The members of the new clubs were not accepted in the Cyprus Football Association (CFA) due to their leftist sympathies, and founded the Cyprus Amateur Football Federation (CAFF) in December 1948. CAFF organized leagues and cups, attracting thousands of fans; CAFF matches attracted more fans than those of the CFA. Six clubs belonged to the new league: Nea Salamis Famagusta, Omonia and Orfeas in Nicosia, Alki at Larnaca, AMOL at Limassol (renamed Antaeus in 1951) and Neos Asteras in Morphou.

=== Unification of Cypriot football ===
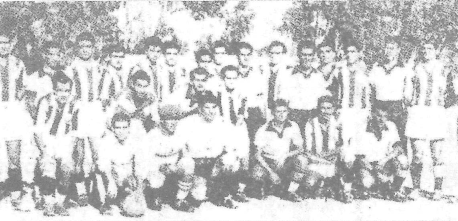
Team photo at the first game after the 1953 unification of Cypriot football, between Nea Salamis and Anorthosis at GSE Stadium in Famagusta

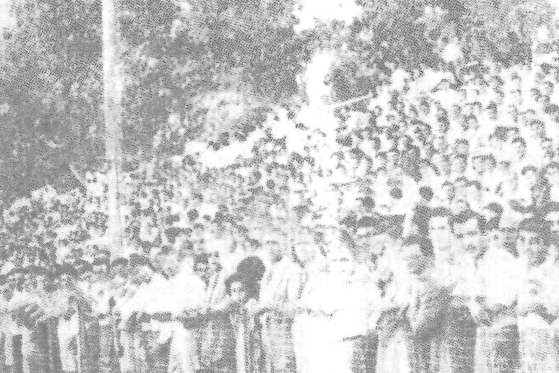
Fans at the first game

Although the CAFF clubs favored the unification of Cypriot football, they were repeatedly rejected over a three-year period by the CFA. The existence of two football federations and two championships was unprecedented in Cyprus. The situation created economic and infrastructure problems, preventing the sport's development in the country. The CAFF clubs also felt that sports should be based on friendship rather than segregation. In December 1952, the first edition of the sports newspaper Athlitiki launched a crusade for the unification of Cypriot football which was supported by the foreign coaches of CFA clubs. According to the CFA, "[The coaches'] statements opposed the spirit of the Federation". During the summer of 1953, most Cypriot sportspeople supported unification. In August 1953, Nea Salamis, Omonia, Alki and Antaeus submitted a joint application to join the CFA's First Division. On 19 September the association accepted Nea Salamis and Omonia as members. However, the organization's negative attitude towards those clubs continued. First, the league rejected applications from Alki, Orfeas Nicosia and Neos Asteras (although the first two joined a year later), and second, arguing that according to its constitution, only one team must participate in the Cypriot First Division and two teams in the second division. The CAFF clubs accepted the conditions in the interest of unification. At an ad hoc meeting, CAFF members agreed that Omonia would join the First Division and Nea Salamis and Antaeus the Second Division. After this, the federation disbanded. The first game between teams from the rival leagues was a friendly between Nea Salamis and Anorthosis at GSE Stadium on 27 September 1953 before a crowd of 5,200. Anorthosis won, 3–1, and Athlitiki praised the fans' sportsmanship and brotherhood.

=== Famagusta municipal stadium ===
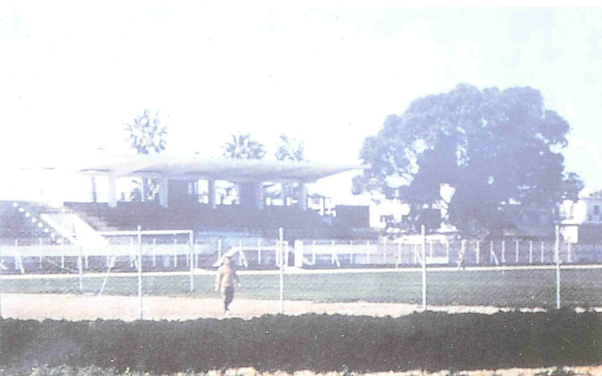
Famagusta municipal stadium, used by Nea Salamis for training until 1974 and its home ground for the 1952–53 season

When Nea Salamis was barred from GSE Stadium, the club had nowhere to play. Initially practicing at the Saint Lukas ("Proodou") court in Famagusta, it began efforts to build a privately owned stadium. In December 1948, Israel donated three thousand pounds to Famagusta for a community project in gratitude to the city's residents for help offered to Jewish refugees. Famagusta alderman and Nea Salamis footballer Gabriel Makris supported a stadium, and the city council acknowledged "financial assistance granted by the Jews to create Municipal Sports Stadium, which is available to Famagustans for the promotion and spread of mass popular sport." The stadium would be available to Nea Salamis and any other sports club. In early 1949, construction began with volunteer labor on a municipal stadium in Saint John's parish in Famagusta. The stadium, the first in Cyprus with a roofed grandstand, was completed in 1952 and was Nea Salamis' home ground in 1952 and 1953. In 1953, after unification of Cyprus' football, Nea Salamina started using GSE Stadium. The Famagusta municipal stadium was used by the team only for training until 1974. That year, when Famagusta was occupied by the Turkish army, the club moved its headquarters in Larnaka.

=== Refugees and reactivation ===
A tragic day in Nea Salamis' history was the 14 August 1974 occupation of Famagusta by Turkish troops as a result of the invasion of Cyprus, which made it a refugee club. The city remains in Turkish hands, and fans and players scattered to free areas of Cyprus or abroad.

Although while Cypriots struggled to adjust to the occupation sports were a low priority, club members tried to maintain its presence. In September 1974 board members Kostas Nikolaos, Nikis Georgiou, Dimos Fotiou and Panayiotis Kalogirou met, deciding to convene a meeting of the full board. Since most board members were in Limassol, the meeting was held in the Aris Limassol F.C. clubhouse on 14 October 1974 with eight of eleven board members present; the other three were abroad. In attendance were Nicholaou Costas (chair), Pantelakis Vasileiou, Dimos Fotiou, Panagiotis Kalogirou, Pambos Charalambous, Christakis Polyviou, Giorgaros Kythreotis and Makis Constantinou, who decided to reactivate Nea Salamis. Since most of the players were in Larnaca, it was decided that the Alki Larnaca F.C. clubhouse would be Nea Salamis' temporary home.

In late 1974, the CFA decided to play a championship season. Although the Nea Salamis board disagreed on whether to play because of their refugee status, they decided to participate—not so much to win as to keep the team in First Division.

There were many problems; Nea Salamis' football fans were scattered across Cyprus, the team no longer had equipment nor a place to train. Without a permanent home, Nea Salamis used the GSZ Stadium for the 1974–75 season. Players of the team lived in various Cypriot cities, and many had been conscripted by the military due to the tense situation on the island. Board members traveled at their own expense across Cyprus, transporting players from Larnaca and the military camps for workouts and matches on day trips.

In January 1975, Nea Salamis rented a building. The team's expenses were covered at first by contributions from members and friends of the club. Two teams were formed to train young players; the first, in Larnaca, was managed by former team member Andreas Konteatis (followed by Nikis Georgiou) and assisted by Nikos Pitsiaoulos. The second team, in Limassol, was trained by Mavrikios Asprou. In 1975 Georgiou proposed a volleyball team in Limassol, since most of Nea Salamis' volleyball supporters were there after 1974, and it was created the following year.

== Emblem, colors and anthem ==
The club's emblem is a red-and-white Olympic flame on a shield with the five Olympic rings in red. Nea Salamis' first colors were yellow and red, worn for two years in the CAFF. After 1950, the club's governing council changed the team's colors to red and white: red for power, and white for peace. Red jerseys with white stripes were chosen because they resembled those worn by Olympiakos Piraeus.

Nea Salamis' anthem, translated from the Greek, is:

Red blood, red outfit
Salamis fight we give you a soul.
Olympia circles illuminating with a torch
The glorious shield of '48.

The red-and-white color I will see
Back to life in empty Famagusta.
Fiery people brave athletes,
Together celebrate everlasting victories.

Red blood, red outfit
Salamis fight, we give you a soul.
Great Salamina never stop
In your refuge fight for us.

In our hearts you are the one, Salamina.

== Football ==
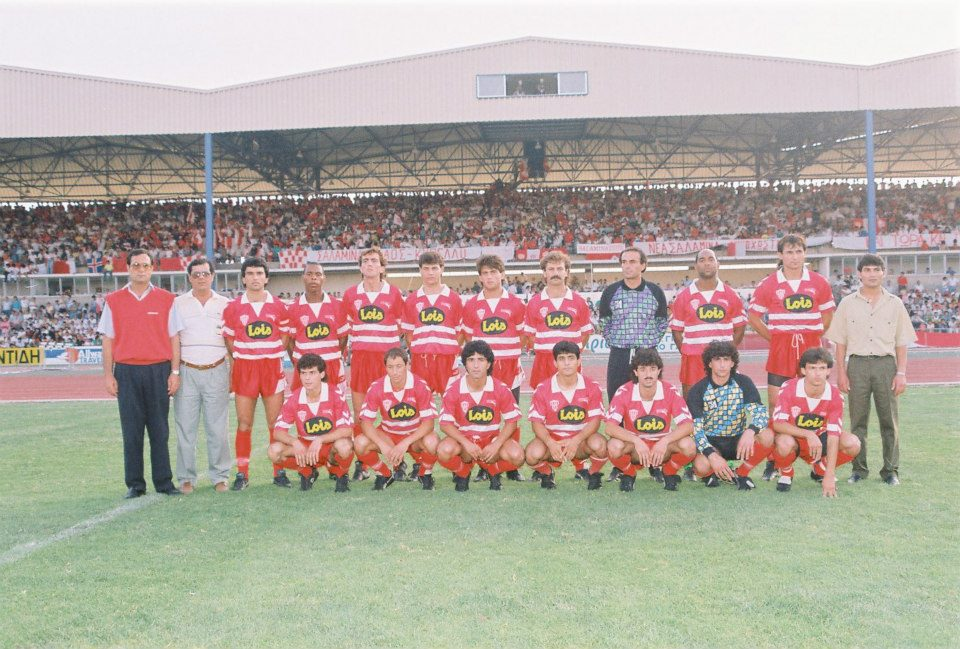
Nea Salamina Famagusta FC at the 1990 Cypriot Cup final at Tsirion Stadium in Limassol

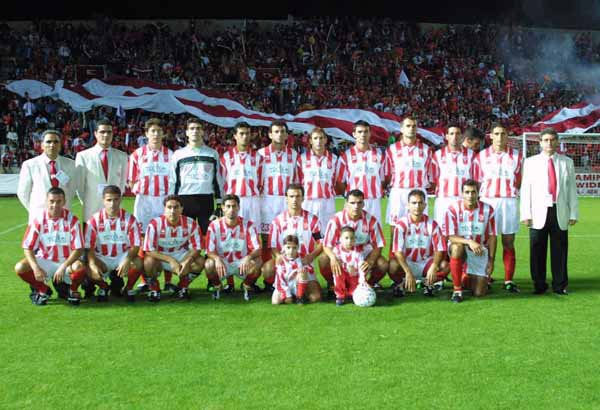
Nea Salamina Famagusta at the 2001 Cypriot Cup final at GSP Stadium

Men's football is Nea Salamis' principal and longest-running program, and the team's home ground is Ammochostos Stadium. Its high point was winning the 1990 Cypriot Cup and Cypriot Super Cups, and the team's highest position in the Cypriot First Division was third.

During the first five years after Nea Salamis was founded (1948–1953) the team played in the Cyprus Amateur Football Federation, joining the Cyprus Football Association (CFA) in 1953. It has played for more than 50 years in the Cypriot First Division, the seventh-highest tenure in the league. Nea Salamis has finished third four times, and has played in three cup finals.

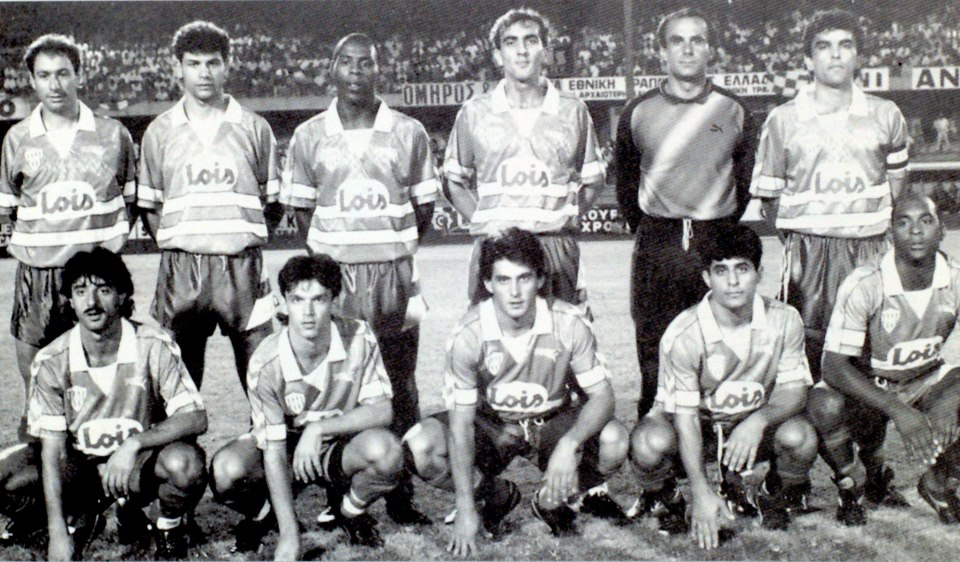
Nea Salamis Famagusta played Aberdeen in the 1990–91 European Cup Winners' Cup at Tsirion Stadium.

As a cup winner Nea Salamis played its first European Cup match in 1990, but was eliminated in the first round by Aberdeen F.C. In the first game, at Tsirion Stadium on 19 September 1990 before 8,000 fans, Nea Salamina lost 2–0 after a scoreless first half. At Pittodrie Stadium in Aberdeen on 3 October 1990, Nea Salamis again lost 3–0. The team played in the 1995 and 1997 UEFA Intertoto Cups, but was eliminated both years in the first round. In the 2000 UEFA Intertoto Cup Nea Salamis advanced to the second round, defeating KS Vllaznia Shkodër twice and FK Austria Wien in Cyprus before losing 3–0 in Vienna.

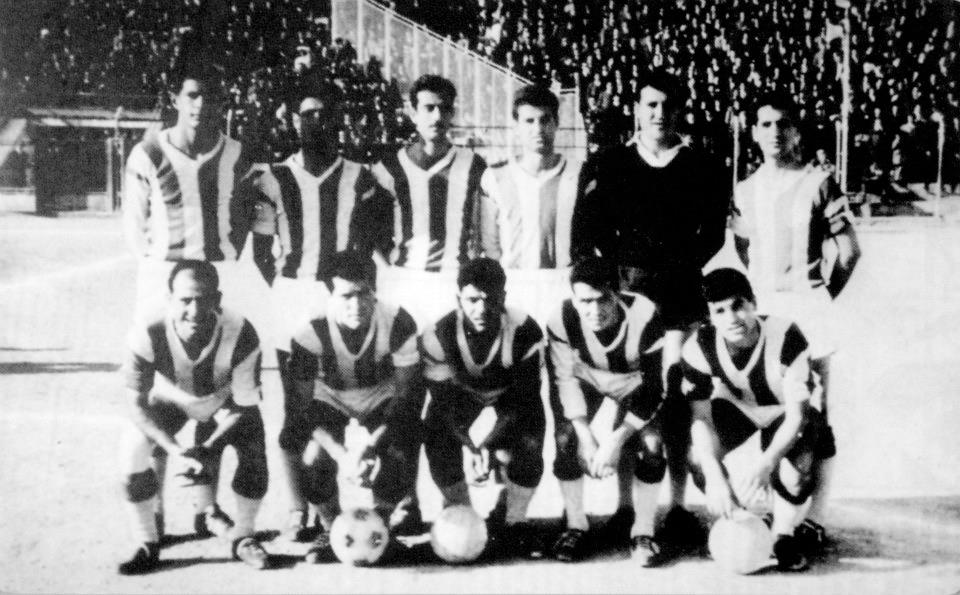
The 1965–66 team

The 1965–66 season had high and low points for the club. According to witnesses and contemporary newspapers, Nea Salamis played the best football in Cyprus. Beginning the season with consecutive wins, the team was in first place until the last game of the season and lost its first cup final. In a game with APOEL at GSP Stadium in Nicosia, Nea Salamis led 3–0. In the 62nd minute, an APOEL player struck a Nea Salamis player; when the assailant was ejected, a fan grabbed the assistant referee's flag and the referee stopped the game. After three weeks, a CFA tribunal decided to replay the match, and Nea Salamis won the replay. Before the season's next-to-last game, Omonia and Nea Salamis were tied for first place with Olympiakos Nicosia one point behind. In the game with Olympiakos, Nea Salamis led 2–1 when the referee added generous stoppage time; after clashes during the final seconds, the game was halted and the CFA tribunal decided to replay the match with the standings Omonia (50 points), Nea Salamina (47) and Olympiakos (46). If Nea Salamis had defeated Olympiakos, they would have won the championship with a better goal difference than Omonia. On 31 May 1966 Nea Salamis' fans traveled from Famagusta to Nicosia, but Nea Salamis lost 6–3. Its defense, the best in the league (allowing 15 goals in 19 games), allowed six in the game and the team finished third for the second time. After the defeat some players left the team, and despite being favored in the cup final over Apollon Limassol Nea Salamis lost 4–2. During the season, the team had the best defense in the league—21 goals in 20 games—for the first (and only) time.

=== Women's team ===
In 2006, Nea Salamis began a women's football program. Its team finished third in the 2006–07 Cypriot First Division and qualified for the cup final, which it lost 3–1 to AEK Kokkinochorion at GSP Stadium. That year the team won the Super Cup, defeating AEK Kokkinochorion 2–1 at Ammochostos Stadium in Larnaca. The women's program was curtailed in 2010 for economic reasons.

=== Ammochostos Stadium ===
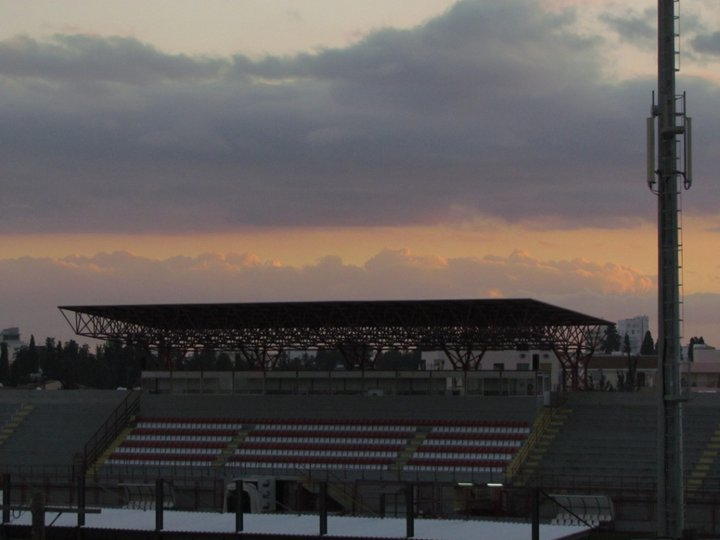
Ammochostos Stadium

Nea Salamis' home ground until the 1974 occupation was GSE Stadium in Famagusta. The 5,000-seat Ammochostos Stadium in Larnaca, owned by the club, is used primarily for football and houses the club offices. The stadium is named for the town of Famagusta (Greek: Αμμόχωστος; Ammochostos), and was built in 1991 near the refugee camps. The decision to build the stadium was made in 1989; construction began in December of that year, and with the aid of club supporters in Cyprus and abroad, the Cyprus Sports Organisation and volunteer labor it was completed on schedule. The first Nea Salamis Famagusta game at the new stadium was on 12 October 1991 against Evagoras Paphos; Nea Salamis won, 4–1. The stadium hosted the 1992 UEFA European Under-16 Championship final on 17 May 1992 between Germany and Spain, which Germany won 2–1.

== Volleyball ==
=== Men's team ===
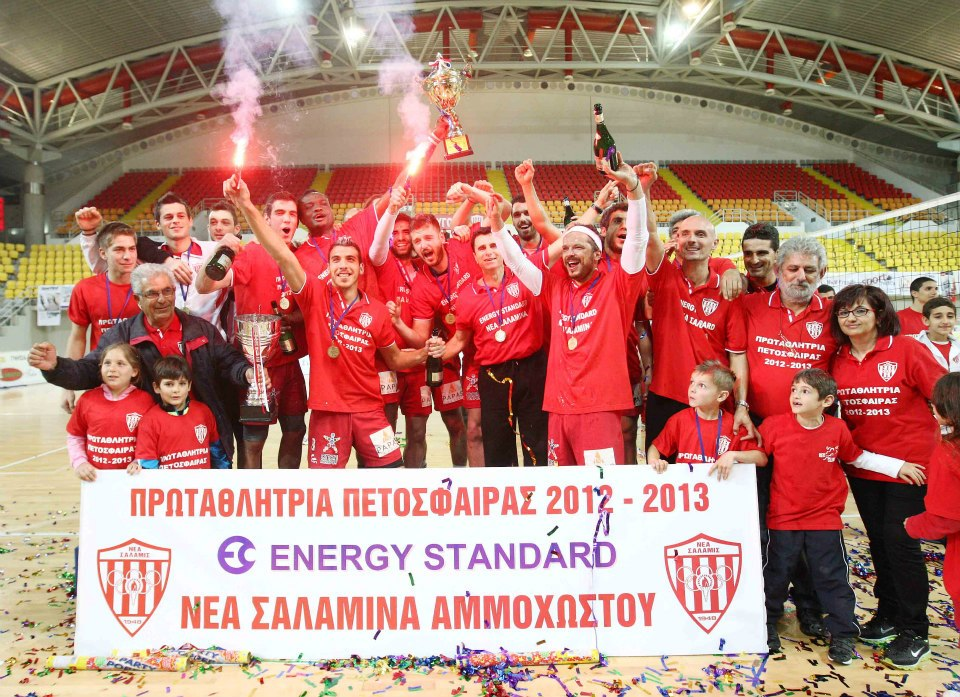
Nea Salamis celebrating its 2012–13 Cyprus Volleyball Division 1 championship at the Spyros Kyprianou Athletic Center

The Nea Salamis Famagusta men's volleyball team of is one of the best in Cyprus. With nine championships, eight cups and eight super cups, it has the second-largest number of trophies after Anorthosis Famagusta FC. The team's home is the indoor Spyros Kyprianou Athletic Center in Limassol.

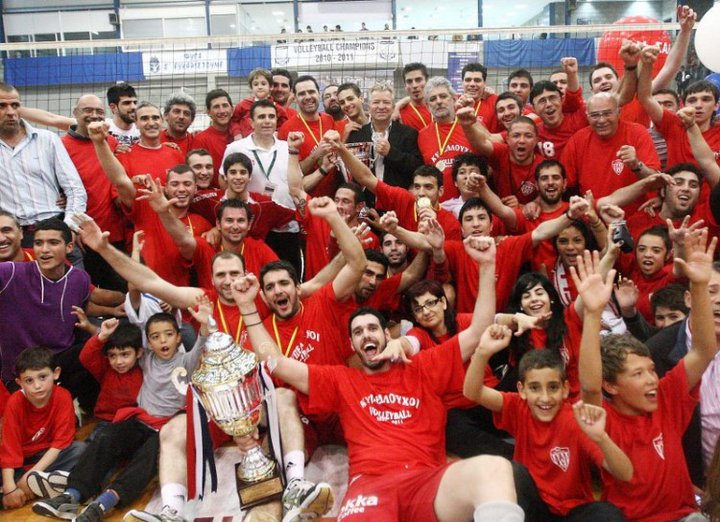
Nea Salamis, 2010–11 Division 1 champions, at Apollon Stadium

From its early days Nea Salamis Famagusta has supported a volleyball program, and since 1954 the club has organized popular amateur summer leagues and championships. Participants have included Anorthosis Famagusta FC, the Anagennisi Dherynia, Marathon Kato Varosha and ENAD Agios Memnon.

In 1975 Nikis Georgiou proposed creating a volleyball team in Limassol to preserve the club since many Nea Salamis fans moved there after the occupation the year before. The volleyball team (created in 1976) is one of 20 charter members of the Cyprus Volleyball Federation, which was founded in 1978. In Nea Salamis' first Cyprus Volleyball Division 1 season the team finished second, also finishing second in 1981 and 1982. In 1981, they lost the championship on a points difference. In 1983 Nea Salamis won its first club-level cup final, defeating Anorthosis 3–1. The team won its first championship (and its second cup) in 1989–90, followed by another championship the next season and a cup the season after that. From 1998 to 2003 Nea Salamis, coached by Antonis Constantinou, won a record six consecutive championships. The last four were trebles, with the team winning the championship, the cup and the super cup. In addition to its victories, the team has been a cup finalist six times. The team, with many European players, qualified for the round of 16 in the 2011–12 Challenge Cup (its greatest success).

=== Women's team ===
In 1978 the club decided to create a women's team in Limassol, first to give women an opportunity to play and secondly to preserve the club. Its first coach was Nikis Georgiou. After the 1984–85 season the board suspended the team for financial reasons, although it was a cup finalist. In seven years, the women's team finished second three times (1980–81, 1981–82 and 1982–83) and was a cup finalist three times (1979–80, 1982–83 and 1984–85).

=== Youth teams ===
Nea Salamis has under-19, under-17 and under-15 teams. The U19 team has won a league-record nine championships, the U17 team a league-record eight and the U15 team a league-record seven. The U19 team has also won a record six cups.

== Track and field ==
Until 1974 Nea Salamis had a track-and-field program. The club's track team was founded by Cypriot champions Nikis Georgiou and Antonis Totsis, who had been expelled from the GSE. Nea Salamis won its first track meet in March 1948 (days after the club's founding), the Famagusta provincial meet, and finished second in 1952 and 1958. In 1970, when Cypriot club meets began, Nea Salamis finished fifth out of thirteen teams; the club was third in 1971 and 1972. In 1973 and 1974 (the last Cypriot club races), Nea Salamis finished fourth.

== Other activities ==
Before 1974 Nea Salamis had other sports programs, competing locally in swimming, boating and table tennis. The club also had an active role in Famagusta's cultural life with outdoor dance performances, theatrical events and marching in holiday parades.

== London and New York clubs ==
In 1971, a group of Nea Salamina fans living in London founded New Salamis in honor of their team in Cyprus. Nea Salamina London maintains close ties with Nea Salamina, with some Famagusta players coming from London. New York Salamina S.C., a Greek Cypriot football club founded in 1999 in New York City by New York Cypriot supporters of Nea Salamis Famagusta, plays in local amateur leagues.

== Relations with Turkish Cypriots ==
Since its founding, Nea Salamis sought to develop friendly relations with the Turkish Cypriot community of Famagusta; an important element was the acceptance of Turkish Cypriots on the team. During the early 1950s, several Turkish Cypriot footballers (including Siekkeris, Nita and Moustafa) joined Nea Salamis. When the team joined the Cyprus Football Association it struggled for two seasons in the second division, playing Turkish Cypriot clubs including Demir Sports, Kenslik Kiounslou and the Turkish Club of Famagusta. When Turkish Cypriot clubs began withdrawing from CFA tournaments in late 1955, Nea Salamis tried to convince them to remain and Turkish players were still welcome in the club. In 1962 Kallikas was transferred to Nea Salamis, and in 1970 Neziak (of Turkish origin) was transferred to the club. In 2004 the Turkish Cypriots Imam and Oulousoi were transferred to Nea Salamina, the first Turkish Cypriot footballers to play in the CAF in thirty years.

On 26 March 2005 Nea Salamis played a friendly football match against the Turkish Cypriot Yenicami at Ammochostos Stadium, winning 6–0; it was the first match between a Greek Cypriot and Turkish Cypriot club in a half-century. The 2,500 fans sat together in the stands, sending a message of peace, and the match was attended by representatives of the political leadership of both communities, local sportspeople and the church.

== Honours ==
=== Football ===
==== Men ====
- Cypriot Cup: 1989–90
- Cypriot Super Cup: 1990
- Cypriot Second Division championship: 1954–55, 1979–80, 2001–02, 2003–04

==== Women ====
- Cyprus Super Cup: 2007

=== Volleyball ===
==== Men ====
- Cyprus Volleyball Division 1 champions: 1989–90, 1990–91, 1997–98, 1998–99, 1999–2000, 2000–01, 2001–02, 2002–03 and 2012–13
- Cyprus Cup: 1982–83, 1989–90, 1991–92, 1999–2000, 2000–01, 2001–02, 2002–03 and 2010–11
- Cyprus Super Cup: 1998, 1999, 2000, 2001, 2002, 2003, 2011 and 2013

==== U19 ====
- Champions: 1994–95, 1998–99, 2004–05, 2005–06, 2006–07, 2007–08, 2010–11, 2011–12 and 2012–13
- Cup: 1996–97, 1998–99, 2005–06, 2006–07, 2007–08 and 2009–10

==== U17 ====
- Champions: 1991–92, 2002–03, 2004–05, 2006–07, 2009–10, 2011–12, 2012–13 and 2016–17

==== U15 ====
- Champions: 1991–92, 2002–03, 2005–06, 2006–07, 2011–12, 2013–14 and 2016–17

== Bibliography ==
- Gavreilides, Michalis; Papamoiseos, Stelios (2001). Ένας αιώνας Κυπριακό ποδόσφαιρο [One century Cypriot football] (in Greek). Nicosia: The writer. ISBN 9963-8720-1-8.
- Meletiou, Giorgos (2011). Κυπριακό ποδόσφαιρο 1900–1960 [Cypriot Football 1900–1960] (in Greek). Nicosia: Power Publishing. ISBN 978-9963-688-87-6.
- Stilianou, Pampos; Georgiou, Neofitos (1988). Νέα Σαλαμίνα, 40 χρόνια πρωτοπόρας αθλητικής πορείας [Nea Salamina, 40 years pioneering sports history] (in Greek). Cyprus: Nea Salamina Famagusta.
- Stilianou, Pampos (1998). 50 χρόνια Νέα Σαλαμίνα 1948–1998 [50 years Nea Salamina 1948–1998] (in Greek). Cyprus: Nea Salamina Famagusta. ISBN 9963-8370-0-X.
- Stephanidis, Giorgos (2003). 40 χρόνια κυπριακές ομάδες στην Ευρώπη [40 years Cypriot teams in Europe] (in Greek). Nicosia: Haravgi. ISBN 9963-8841-1-3.
