= Andreas Mouskallis =

Cypriot footballer (born 1950)

Personal information
- Date of birth: 10 January 1950 (age 76)
- Place of birth: British Cyprus
- Position: Midfielder

Senior career*
Years	Team	Apps	(Gls)
1967–1974	Nea Salamina	96	(8)
- * Club domestic league appearances and goals

Andreas Mouskallis (Greek: Ανδρέας Μουσκάλλης; born 1 January 1950) is a Cypriot former football manager and footballer.

== Early life ==
Mouskallis was born in 1950 in Cyprus. He is a native of Yialousa.

== Career ==
Mouskallis started his career with Cypriot side Nea Salamina. He was described as having a "huge contribution to the field of Cypriot football".

== Personal life ==
Mouskallis has been married. After retiring from professional football, he worked as a member of parliament.
