= Panagiotis Artymatas =

Cypriot footballer

Personal information
- Full name: Panagiotis Artymatas
- Date of birth: 12 November 1998 (age 27)
- Place of birth: Paralimni, Cyprus
- Height: 1.86 m (6 ft 1 in)
- Position: Centre-back

Team information
- Current team: Nea Salamina Famagusta
- Number: 4

Youth career
- 2010–2013: EN Paralimni
- 2014–2017: West Bromwich Albion

Senior career*
Years	Team	Apps	(Gls)
2013–2014	EN Paralimni	2	(0)
2017–2022	Anorthosis Famagusta	21	(0)
2021–2022	→ Kifisia (loan)	22	(0)
2022–2025	Apollon Limassol	9	(0)
2023–2024	→ Ethnikos Achna (loan)	12	(0)
2025	→ Karmiotissa (loan)	9	(0)
2025-	Nea Salamis Famagusta	20	(3)

International career
2014	Cyprus U17	3	(0)
2015–2017	Cyprus U19	14	(0)
2017–2020	Cyprus U21	17	(1)
- * Club domestic league appearances and goals as of 3 May 2026

Panagiotis Artymatas (Greek: Παναγιώτης Αρτυματάς; born 12 November 1998) is a Cypriot professional footballer who plays as a centre-back for Nea Salamis Famagusta.

== Career ==
On 12 January 2014, Artymatas made his debut for EN Paralimni in a match against AEL Limassol. His brothers is Kostakis Artymatas.
