= Ammochostos Epistrofi Stadium =

Sports venue in Larnaca, Cyprus

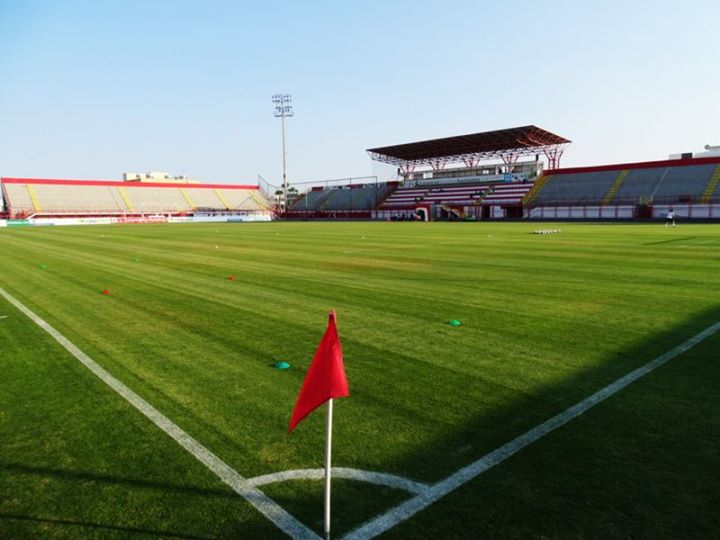
- Interactive map of Ammochostos Epistrofi Stadium
- Full name: Vitex Ammochostos Epistrofi Stadium
- Location: Larnaca, Cyprus
- Coordinates: 34°55′47″N 33°36′47″E
- Owner: Nea Salamis Famagusta
- Operator: Nea Salamis Famagusta
- Capacity: 5,500
- Surface: Natural Grass

Construction
- Groundbreaking: 1991
- Opened: 1992
- Renovated: 1998
- Expanded: 1998

Tenants
- Nea Salamis Famagusta; Krasava ENY Ypsonas

Ammochostos Epistrofi Stadium (Greek: Στάδιο Αμμόχωστος Επιστροφή) is a multi-purpose stadium in Larnaca, Cyprus, with a capacity of 5,500. It is currently used mostly for football matches and the temporary home ground of the refugee team from the occupied city of Famagusta, Nea Salamis Famagusta FC.

== History ==
The original home ground of Nea Salamis Famagusta FC was GSE Stadium. The ground has remained abandoned since the 1974 Turkish invasion of Cyprus, which led to the occupation of Famagusta. After a certain period, Nea Salamis moved, temporarily, to Larnaca and built their own stadium.

The decision to build the stadium came in 1989, resulting in December of the same year for construction to begin. Financial help for the stadium to be built was offered from Nea Salamis fans in Cyprus and abroad, with also the Cyprus Sports Association. The first official game of Nea Salamina Famagusta in the stadium was played on 12 October 1991 with Evagoras Paphos as the opponent. Nea Salamina was able to win 4–1.

In 1998, the stadium underwent some renovations and expanded its capacity. Since 2007, under the south stand of the stadium is the dwelling and the offices of Nea Salamis FC.

=== European Competitions ===
The stadium hosted the final of the 1992 UEFA European Under-16 Championship which took place on the 17th of May 1992 between Germany and Spain where Germany won 2–1..

In 2024, Cyprus hosted the UEFA European Under-17 Championship, with Ammochostos Epistrofi Stadium hosting 6 matches in total throughout the competition.

== Name ==
Ammochostos Epistrofi Stadium is named after the town of Famagusta (Greek: Αμμόχωστος; Ammochostos), which is the original seat of Nea Salamina. 'Epistrofi' signifies the club returning one day home back to Famagusta.

== Other teams ==
The stadium was used for some periods as a home ground by many teams in Cyprus.

- Alki Larnaca FC (2007—2009)
- AEL Limassol (in 2001, for a little period due to the improvement of their own ground)
- Ermis Aradippou (2001–02, 2010–11, 2011-12, 2013–14, 2020–21)
- Doxa Katokopia (2012-13 to 2013-14)
- Alki Oroklini (2016-17 to 2022-23)
- AEZ Zakakiou (2023-24)
- Othellos Athienou (2023-24)
- Krasava ENY Ypsonas (2025-26)

== Gallery ==
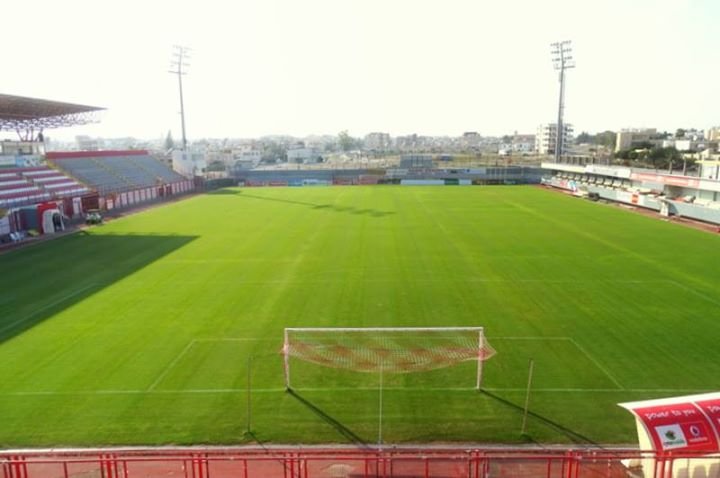

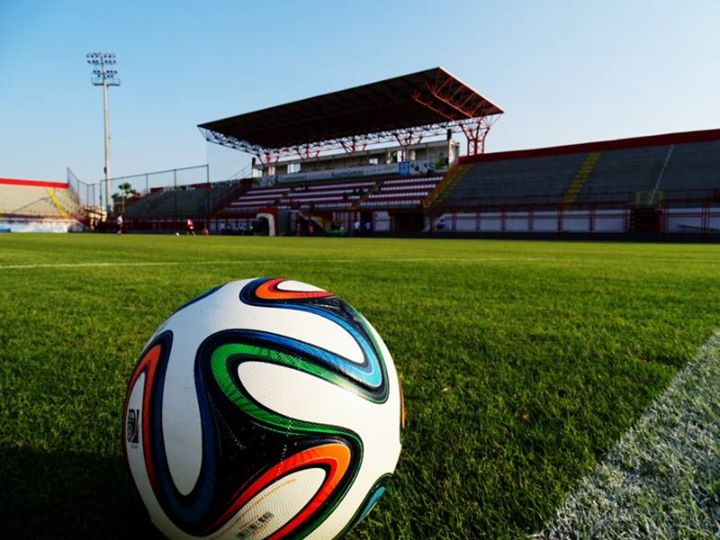

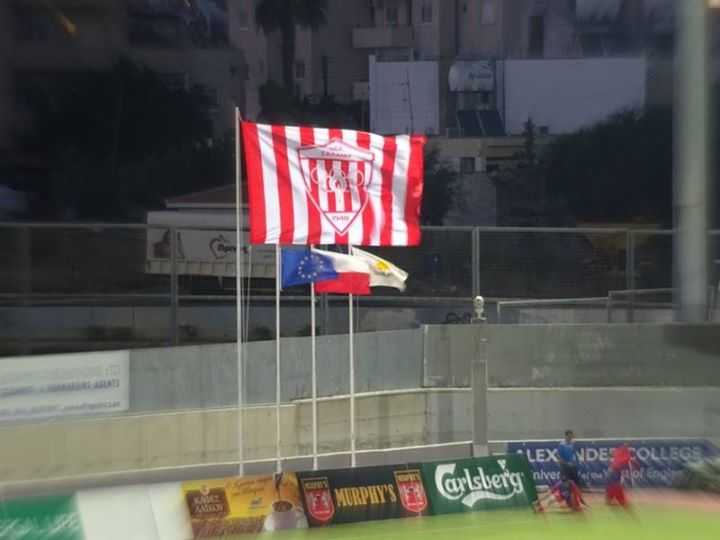

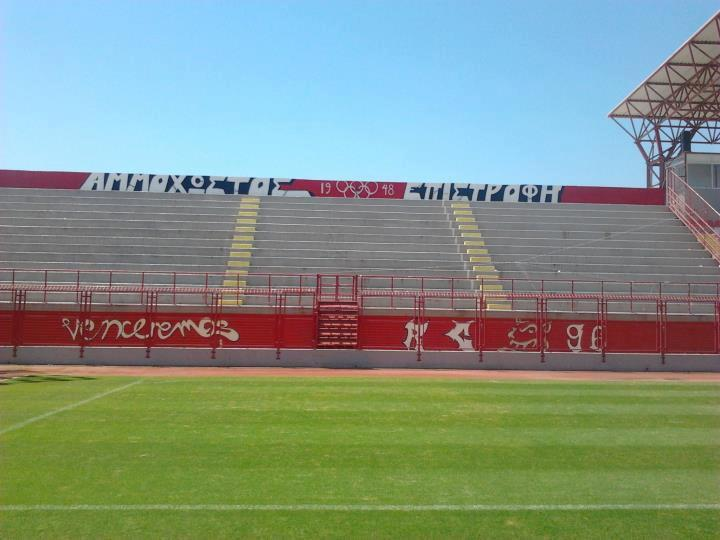

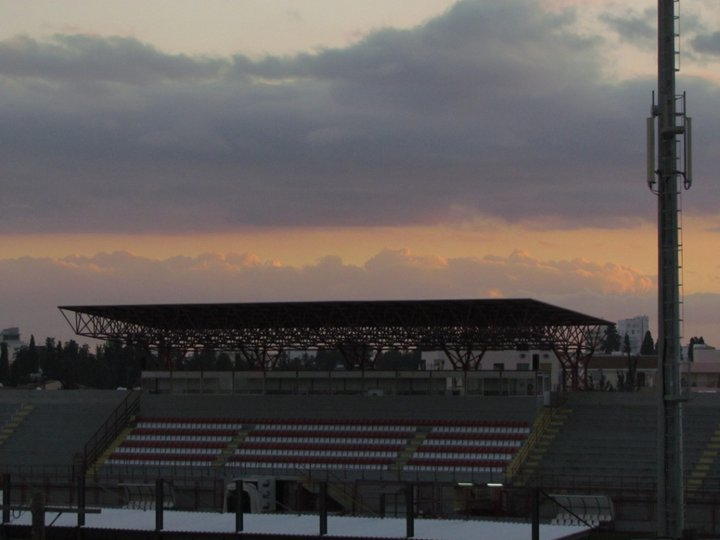

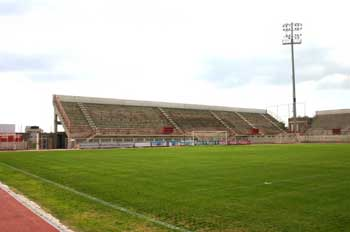

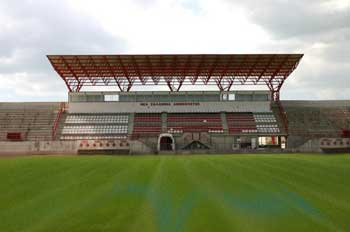

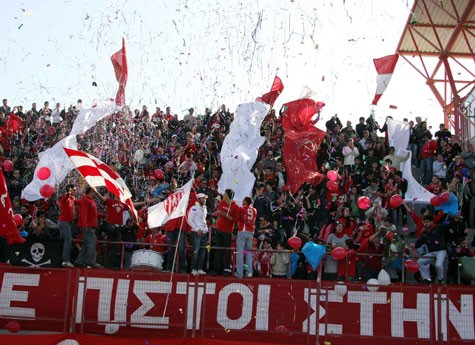

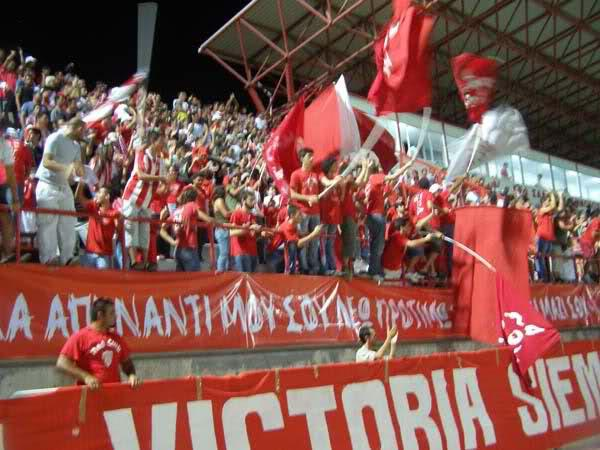

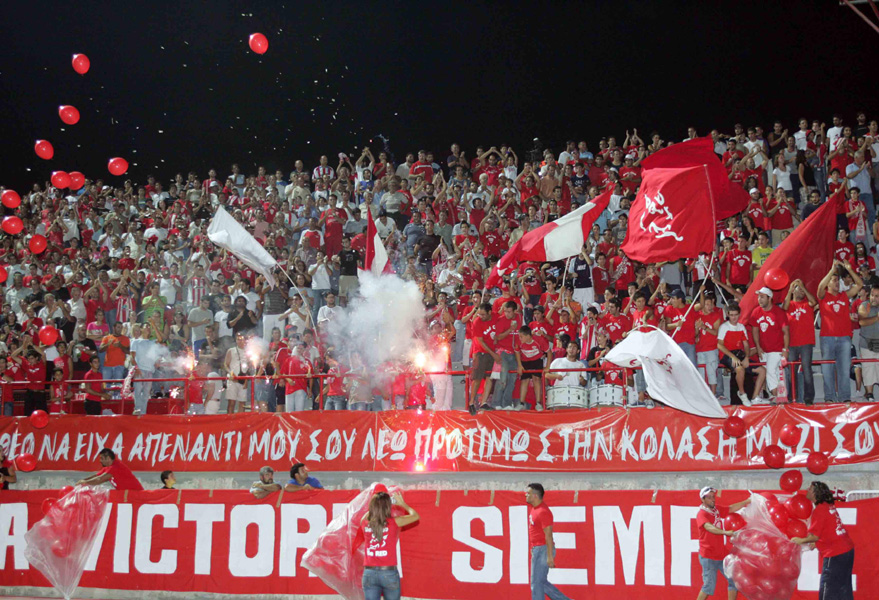
