= Cypriot football league system =

The Cyprus football league system is a series of interconnected leagues for club football in Cyprus. The system has a hierarchical format with promotion and relegation between leagues at different levels. The top three leagues are organised by the Cyprus Football Association and the rest by the S.T.O.K. (Greek: Σ.Τ.Ο.Κ. short for Συνομοσπονδία Τοπικών Ομοσπονδιών Κύπρου, "Confederation of local federations of Cyprus").

== Structure ==
At the top is the Cypriot First Division (which may be referred to as level 1 of the league "pyramid"), a single-division league of 14 clubs. Below is Cyprus lower leagues, which are divided into two divisions of 16 clubs (Second Division) and 16 clubs (Third Division). Some of these 46 clubs are full-time professional while the rest are semi-professional. Confusingly all 46 are often referred to as "league" clubs because there are only three leagues in Cyprus, but no non-leagues. Clubs outside this group are referred to as "non-league" clubs, although they all play most of their football in cup competitions.

Only the Amateur leagues are referred as non-league, which is on the same level (level 4) as the top divisions. The first (top) league of Amateur Divisions is the STOK Elite Division. At the end of each season the top three clubs from the STOK Elite Division are promoted to the Cypriot Third Division and the last four clubs are relegated to the lower amateur divisions.

Beyond STOK Elite Division exists a large group of other Amateur leagues. Each of these leagues has a different divisional set up, but they all have one thing in common: there are yet more leagues below them, each covering smaller and smaller geographical levels. These leagues are collectively known as the National League System and they are controlled by S.T.O.K.

Each league sets its own rules, but all follow the general standard of each club playing everyone else Once with three points being awarded for a win, one for a draw and zero for a loss. The league table is always ordered with whoever has the most points at the top and the least at the bottom (ways of distinguishing between clubs level on points differ from league to league). Promotion to the STOK Elite Division is decided by the STOK (Greek: Σ.Τ.Ο.Κ.) play-offs.

Various degrees of promotion and relegation exist between all the leagues and divisions, meaning that any team can theoretically climb (or fall) to any level. However, minimum standards for grounds (floodlighting, seating capacity, etc.) sometimes lead to clubs being denied promotion even though their league position would allow it.

The Cypriot football league system includes some clubs from the British Overseas Territory of Akrotiri and Dhekelia, such as Ethnikos Achna FC and APEA Akrotiri.

== Promotion and relegation ==
- Cypriot First Division (level 1, 14 teams): Top team becomes champions, (no promotion). Bottom three teams are relegated.
- Cypriot Second Division (level 2, 16 teams): Top three teams are automatically promoted. Bottom three teams are relegated.
- Cypriot Third Division (level 3, 16 teams): Top three teams are automatically promoted. Bottom three teams are relegated.
- STOK Elite Division (level 4, 16 teams): Top three teams are automatically promoted. Bottom four teams are relegated.

== Cup Eligibility ==
Being members of a league at a particular level also affects eligibility for Cup, or single-elimination, competitions.

- Cypriot Cup: Levels 1-2
- Cypriot Cup for lower divisions: Levels 3-4

Clubs in the S.T.O.K. competitions participate in various cup tournaments, usually local.

== The system ==
The table below shows the current structure of the system. For each division, its official name, sponsorship name (which often differs radically from its official name) and number of clubs is given. Each division promotes to the division(s) that lie directly above it and relegates to the division(s) that lie directly below it.

Level	League(s)/Division(s)
1	First Division 14 clubs
	↓↑ 3 clubs
2	Second Division 16 clubs
	↓↑ 3 clubs
3	Third Division 16 clubs
	↓↑ 3 clubs
4	STOK Elite Division 16 clubs
	↓↑ 4 clubs
5	Local amateur football competitions (S.T.O.K.) 260 clubs (approx.); Promotion to STOK Elite Division through play-offs.
