= AEM Morphou =

- Full name: Athlitiki Enosi Morphou
- Short name: AEM
- Founded: 1960; 66 years ago
- Dissolved: 1991; 35 years ago
- Ground: Morphou Municipal Stadium

AEM Morphou (Greek: Αθλητικη Ένωση Μόρφου, Athlitiki Enosi Morphou; "Athletic Union Morphou") was a Cypriot football club based in Morphou founded in 1960. It competed in the Second, Third, and Fourth divisions of the Cypriot football league system.

After the Turkish invasion of Cyprus and occupation of the city of Morphou in 1974, the team was displaced to the southern part of the island in Limassol. The team dissolved in 1991 due to financial problems.
