= 1970–71 Cypriot Second Division =

Cypriot Second Division
- Season: 1970–71
- Champions: APOP Paphos FC (2nd title)
- Promoted: APOP Paphos FC
- Relegated: LALL Lysi

The 1970–71 Cypriot Second Division was the 16th season of the Cypriot second-level football league. APOP Paphos FC won their 2nd title.

== Format ==
Twelve teams participated in the 1970–71 Cypriot Second Division. All teams played against each other twice, once at their home and once away. The team with the most points at the end of the season crowned champions. The first team was promoted to 1971–72 Cypriot First Division. The last team was relegated to the 1971–72 Cypriot Third Division.

== Changes from previous season ==
Teams promoted to 1970–71 Cypriot First Division

- Digenis Akritas Morphou FC

Teams relegated to 1970–71 Cypriot Third Division

- Achilleas Kaimakli FC
- Keravnos Strovolou FC
- Apollon Athienou
- Anagennisi Larnacas

Teams relegated from 1969–70 Cypriot First Division

- Aris Limassol FC

Moreover, Arion Lemesou merged with Apollon Limassol.

== League standings ==
Pos	Team	Pld	W	D	L	GF	GA	GD	Pts	Promotion or relegation
1	APOP Paphos FC (C, P)	22	15	4	3	51	21	+30	34	Promoted to Cypriot First Division
2	Aris Limassol FC	22	13	6	3	50	19	+31	32	
3	AEM Morphou	22	12	6	4	45	23	+22	30	
4	Othellos Athienou FC	22	12	4	6	37	24	+13	28	
5	Evagoras Paphos	22	10	6	6	28	20	+8	26	
6	AEK Ammochostos	22	10	4	8	48	35	+13	24	
7	Chalkanoras Idaliou	22	7	7	8	33	36	−3	21	
8	Enosis Panelliniou-Antaeus Limassol	22	8	3	11	30	39	−9	19	
9	PAEEK FC	22	7	4	11	31	51	−20	18	
10	Orfeas Nicosia	22	6	1	15	27	54	−27	13	
11	ENAD Ayiou Dometiou FC	22	4	3	15	26	50	−24	11	
12	LALL Lysi (R)	22	3	2	17	20	54	−34	8	Relegated to Cypriot Third Division

Rules for classification: 1) Points, 2) Goal differences, 3) Goal for. Points system: Won=2 points, Drawn=1 point, Lost=0 points.
(C) Champions; (P) Promoted; (R) Relegated

== See also ==
- Cypriot Second Division
- 1970–71 Cypriot First Division
- 1970–71 Cypriot Cup
