= 1954–55 Cypriot Second Division =

Cypriot Second Division
- Season: 1954–55
- Champions: Nea Salamina (1st title)
- Promoted: Nea Salamina

The 1954–55 Cypriot Second Division was the second season of the Cypriot second-level football league. Nea Salamis Famagusta won their 1st title.

== Format ==
Eleven teams participated in the 1954–55 Cypriot Second Division. The league was split into three geographical groups, depending from which Districts of Cyprus each participated team came from. All teams of each group played against each other twice, once at their home and once away. The team with the most points at the end of the season were crowned group champions. The winners of each group played against each other in the final phase of the competition and the winner were the champions of the Second Division. The champion were promoted to the 1955–56 Cypriot First Division.

Teams received two points for a win, one point for a draw and zero points for a loss.

== Changes from previous season ==
Teams promoted to 1954–55 Cypriot First Division

- Aris Limassol

New members of CFA

- Alki Larnaca
- Orfeas Nicosia
- PAEK

== Stadiums and locations ==
Locations of the 1954–55 Cypriot Second Division teams.

Group	Team	Stadium
Nicosia-Keryneia	Gençlik Gücü	GSP Stadium
Nicosia-Keryneia	Orfeas	GSP Stadium
Nicosia-Keryneia	PAEK	G.S. Praxander Stadium
Limassol-Paphos	Antaeus	GSO Stadium
Limassol-Paphos	APOP	GSK Stadium
Limassol-Paphos	Doğan Türk Birliği	GSO Stadium
Limassol-Paphos	Panellinios	GSO Stadium
Larnaca-Famagusta	Alki	GSZ Stadium
Larnaca-Famagusta	Gençler Birliği	GSZ Stadium
Larnaca-Famagusta	Nea Salamina	GSE Stadium
Larnaca-Famagusta	Mağusa Türk Gücü	GSE Stadium

== Nicosia-Keryneia Group ==
League standings

Pos	Team	Pld	W	D	L	GF	GA	GD	Pts	Qualification
1	Orfeas Nicosia	4	2	2	0	10	5	+5	6	Advanced to Champions Playoffs
2	Gençlik Gücü	4	1	2	1	7	6	+1	4	
3	PAEK	4	0	2	2	4	10	−6	2	

Results

Home \ Away	GNC	ORF	PKK
Gençlik Gücü		2–2	4–0
Orfeas	3–0		4–2
PAEK	1–1	1–1	

Legend: Blue = home team win; Yellow = draw; Red = away team win.

== Larnaca-Famagusta Group ==
League standings

Pos	Team	Pld	W	D	L	GF	GA	GD	Pts	Qualification
1	Nea Salamis Famagusta	6	6	0	0	26	1	+25	12	Advanced to Champions Playoffs
2	Gençler Birliği	6	4	0	2	21	14	+7	8	
3	Alki Larnaca	6	2	0	4	14	23	−9	4	
4	Mağusa Türk Gücü	6	0	0	6	9	32	−23	0	

Results

Home \ Away	ALK	NSL	GNC	MGS
Alki		0–7	1–2	7–2
Nea Salamis	4–0		2–0	6–0
Gençler Birliği	5–2	1–5		9–2
Mağusa Türk	3–4	0–1	2–4	

Legend: Blue = home team win; Yellow = draw; Red = away team win.

== Limassol-Paphos Group ==
League standings

Pos	Team	Pld	W	D	L	GF	GA	GD	Pts	Qualification
1	Antaeus Limassol	6	3	3	0	8	2	+6	9	Advanced to Champions Playoffs
2	APOP Paphos	6	4	0	2	17	11	+6	8	
3	Doğan Türk Birliği	6	1	2	3	4	9	−5	4	
4	Panellinios Limassol	6	1	1	4	2	9	−7	3	

Results

Home \ Away	ANT	APP	PNL	DGT
Antaeus		5–2	1–0	0–0
APOP	0–2		4–1	5–1
Panellinios	0–0	0–3		1–0
Doğan Türk	0–0	2–3	1–0	

Legend: Blue = home team win; Yellow = draw; Red = away team win.

== Champions Playoffs ==
League standings

Pos	Team	Pld	W	D	L	GF	GA	GD	Pts	Promotion
1	Nea Salamis Famagusta (C, P)	4	3	1	0	17	5	+12	7	Promoted to Cypriot First Division
2	Orfeas Nicosia	4	2	1	1	8	12	−4	5	
3	Antaeus Limassol	4	0	0	4	3	11	−8	0	

(C) Champions; (P) Promoted

Results

Home \ Away	ANT	NSL	ORF
Antaeus		0–3	1–2
Nea Salamis	3–2		3–3
Orfeas	3–0	0–8	

Legend: Blue = home team win; Yellow = draw; Red = away team win.

== See also ==
- Cypriot Second Division
- 1954–55 Cypriot First Division
- 1954–55 Cypriot Cup

== Sources ==
- "Cyprus 1954/55". RSSSF.
