= 1969–70 Cypriot Second Division =

Cypriot Second Division
- Season: 1969–70
- Champions: Digenis Akritas Morphou FC (1st title)
- Promoted: Digenis Akritas Morphou FC
- Relegated: Achilleas Kaimakli FC; Keravnos Strovolou FC; Apollon Athienou; Anagennisi Larnacas

The 1969–70 Cypriot Second Division was the 15th season of the Cypriot second-level football league. Digenis Akritas Morphou FC won their 1st title.

== Format ==
Seventeen teams participated in the 1969–70 Cypriot Second Division. All teams played against each other twice, once at their home and once away. The team with the most points at the end of the season crowned champions. The first team was promoted to 1970–71 Cypriot First Division. The last four teams were relegated to the 1970–71 Cypriot Third Division.

== Changes from previous season ==
Teams promoted to 1969–70 Cypriot First Division

- Enosis Neon Paralimni FC

Teams that approved for membership in CFA

- Apollon Athienou
- LALL Lysi
- Chalkanoras Idaliou

Teams relegated from 1969–70 Cypriot First Division

- Evagoras Paphos

Moreover, Keravnos Strovolou FC return after one season. Furthermore, Ethnikos Asteras Limassol and Ethnikos Achna FC were competing in the league but after some games they were expelled.

== League standings ==
Pos	Team	Pld	W	D	L	GF	GA	GD	Pts	Promotion or relegation
1	Digenis Akritas Morphou FC (C, P)	32	–	–	–	109	13	+96	94	Promoted to Cypriot First Division
2	Enosis Panelliniou-Antaeus Limassol	32	–	–	–	82	35	+47	88	
3	Evagoras Paphos	32	–	–	–	82	27	+55	86	
4	Othellos Athienou FC	32	–	–	–	73	29	+44	83	
5	APOP Paphos FC	32	–	–	–	81	37	+44	81	
6	PAEEK FC	32	–	–	–	75	49	+26	78	
7	AEK Ammochostos	32	–	–	–	80	40	+40	76	
8	Arion Lemesou	32	–	–	–	78	40	+38	75	
9	Orfeas Nicosia	32	–	–	–	90	59	+31	73	
10	Chalkanoras Idaliou	32	–	–	–	69	54	+15	65	
11	AEM Morphou	32	–	–	–	38	68	−30	61	
12	ENAD Ayiou Dometiou FC	32	–	–	–	49	63	−14	60	
13	LALL Lysi	32	–	–	–	45	54	−9	58	
14	Achilleas Kaimakli FC (R)	32	–	–	–	40	76	−36	57	Relegated to Cypriot Third Division
15	Keravnos Strovolou FC (R)	32	–	–	–	35	82	−47	51	Relegated to Cypriot Third Division
16	Apollon Athienou (R)	32	–	–	–	24	102	−78	50	Relegated to Cypriot Third Division
17	Anagennisi Larnacas (R)	32	–	–	–	28	139	−111	47	Relegated to Cypriot Third Division

Rules for classification: 1) Points, 2) Goal differences, 3) Goal for. Points system: Won=3 points, Drawn=2 points, Lost=1 point.
(C) Champions; (P) Promoted; (R) Relegated

== See also ==
- Cypriot Second Division
- 1969–70 Cypriot First Division
- 1969–70 Cypriot Cup
