= 1962–63 Cypriot Cup =

Tournament details
- Country: Cyprus
- Dates: 12 May 1963-30 June 1963
- Teams: 22

Final positions
- Champions: APOEL (5th title)
- Runners-up: Anorthosis

The 1962–63 Cypriot Cup was the 21st edition of the Cypriot Cup. A total of 22 clubs entered the competition. It began with the first round on 12 May 1963 and concluded on 30 June 1963 with the final which was held at GSP Stadium. APOEL won their 5th Cypriot Cup trophy after beating Anorthosis 1–0 in the final.

== Format ==
In the 1962–63 Cypriot Cup, participated the teams of the Cypriot First Division and the teams of the Cypriot Second Division.

The competition consisted of five knock-out rounds. In all rounds each tie was played as a single leg and was held at the home ground of one of the two teams, according to the draw results. Each tie winner was qualifying to the next round. If a match was drawn, extra time was following. If extra time was drawn, there was a replay match.

The cup winner secured a place in the 1963–64 European Cup Winners' Cup.

== First round ==
Team 1	Result	Team 2
(B) Panellinios Limassol	1 - 3	Anagennisi Larnacas (B)
(A) Orfeas Nicosia	1 - 0	EPA Larnaca (A)
(B) PAEEK	0 - 16	Olympiakos Nicosia (A)
(B) Gaydzak Nicosia	1 - 7	Anorthosis Famagusta (A)
(B) APOP Paphos	0 - 8	Nea Salamis Famagusta (A)
(A) Aris Limassol	8 - 1	Amathus Limassol (B)
(A) AEL Limassol	Bye
(B) AEK Ammochostos	Bye
(A) Alki Larnaca	Bye
(A) Apollon Limassol	Bye
(A) APOEL Nicosia	Bye
(B) Enosis-Keravnos Strovolou	Bye
(B) Ethnikos Asteras Limassol	Bye
(A) Omonia Nicosia	Bye
(A) Pezoporikos Larnaca	Bye
(B) Evagoras Paphos	Bye

== Second round ==
Team 1	Result	Team 2
(A) AEL Limassol	11 - 0	AEK Ammochostos (B)
(A) Alki Larnaca	7 - 0	Anagennisi Larnacas (B)
(A) Anorthosis Famagusta	5 - 2	Apollon Limassol (A)
(A) APOEL	5 - 0	Keravnos Strovolou (B)
(A) Olympiakos Nicosia	4 - 0	Ethnikos Asteras Limassol (B)
(A) AC Omonia	6 - 1	Aris Limassol (A)
(A) Nea Salamis Famagusta	5 - 0	Pezoporikos Larnaca (A)
(B) Evagoras Paphos	1 - 2	Orfeas Nicosia (A)

== Quarter-finals ==
Team 1	Result	Team 2
(A) AEL Limassol	1 - 4	Anorthosis Famagusta (A)
(A) Alki Larnaca	1 - 0 (aet)	Nea Salamis Famagusta (A)
(A) APOEL	2 - 1	Olympiakos Nicosia (A)
(A) AC Omonia	3 - 0	Orfeas Nicosia (A)

== Semi-finals ==
Team 1	Result	Team 2
(A) Alki Larnaca	0 - 1	APOEL (A)
(A) AC Omonia	1 - 3	Anorthosis Famagusta (A)

== Final ==
23 June 1963

APOEL	2 – 2	Anorthosis Famagusta
Pantelis 11'; Pantelis 13'		32' Sialis; 66' Sialis

GSP Stadium, Nicosia

Because the match was drawn after extra time, a replay match was played.

30 June 1963

APOEL	1 – 0	Anorthosis Famagusta
Pappalos 56'

GSP Stadium, Nicosia

Cypriot Cup 1962–63 Winners
APOEL
5th title

== Sources ==
- "1962/63 Cyprus Cup". RSSSF. 2017-08-24.

== Bibliography ==
- Gavreilides, Michalis; Papamoiseos, Stelios (2001). Ένας αιώνας Κυπριακό ποδόσφαιρο [One century Cypriot football] (in Greek). Nicosia: The writer. p. 73. ISBN 9963-8720-1-8.
- Stephanidis, Giorgos (2003). 40 χρόνια κυπριακές ομάδες στην Ευρώπη [40 years Cypriot teams in Europe] (in Greek). Nicosia: Haravgi. p. 24. ISBN 9963-8841-1-3.

== See also ==
- Cypriot Cup
- 1962–63 Cypriot First Division
