= 1961–62 Cypriot Cup =

Tournament details
- Country: Cyprus
- Dates: 17 February 1962 – 17 June 1962
- Teams: 23

Final positions
- Champions: Anorthosis (3rd title)
- Runners-up: Olympiakos

The 1961–62 Cypriot Cup was the 20th edition of the Cypriot Cup. A total of 23 clubs entered the competition. It began with the first round and concluded on 17 June 1962 with the final which was held at GSP Stadium. Anorthosis won their 3rd Cypriot Cup trophy after beating Olympiakos 5–2 in the final.

== Format ==
In the 1961–62 Cypriot Cup, participated the teams of the Cypriot First Division and the teams of the Cypriot Second Division.

The competition consisted of five knock-out rounds. In all rounds each tie was played as a single leg and was held at the home ground of one of the two teams, according to the draw results. Each tie winner was qualifying to the next round. If a match was drawn, extra time was following. If extra time was drawn, there was a replay match.

== First round ==
Team 1	Result	Team 2
(A) AC Omonia	11 - 2	Gaydzak Nicosia (B)
(A) Anorthosis Famagusta	19 - 0	AEK Ammochostos (B)
(A) Apollon Limassol	6 - 0	Panellinios Limassol (B)
(B) PAEEK	0 - 9	EPA Larnaca (A)
(B) Amathus Limassol	0 - 3	Orfeas Nicosia (A)
(A) Pezoporikos Larnaca	2 - 2, 4 - 0	Aris Limassol (A)
(B) Othellos Famagusta	2 - 3	Keravnos Strovolou (B)

== Second round ==
Team 1	Result	Team 2
(A) AEL Limassol	1 - 0	Apollon Limassol (A)
(A) Anorthosis Famagusta	5 - 1	Alki Larnaca (A)
(B) Anagennisi Larnacas	0 - 7	AC Omonia (A)
(A) APOEL	3 - 3, 0 - 2	Orfeas Nicosia (A)
(B) EPA Larnaca	11 - 0	APOP Paphos (A)
(B) Ethnikos Asteras Limassol	2 - 5	Pezoporikos Larnaca (A)
(A) Olympiakos Nicosia	7 - 0	AYMA (A)
(A) Nea Salamis Famagusta	5 - 1	Keravnos Strovolou (B)

== Quarter-finals ==
Team 1	Result	Team 2
(A) Anorthosis Famagusta	1 - 0	AC Omonia (A)
(A) AEL Limassol	1 - 0 (aet)	EPA Larnaca (A)
(A) Pezoporikos Larnaca	1 - 2	Olympiakos Nicosia (A)
(A) Orfeas Nicosia	0 - 2 (aet)	Nea Salamis Famagusta (A)

== Semi-finals ==
Team 1	Result	Team 2
(A) Anorthosis Famagusta	3 - 1	AEL Limassol (A)
(A) Olympiakos Nicosia	2 - 1	Nea Salamis Famagusta (A)

== Final ==
17 June 1962

Anorthosis Famagusta	5 – 2	Olympiakos Nicosia
Antis Konstantinou 31'; Panos Siailos 41'; Panos Siailos 43'; Michales Ioannou (Sialis) 49'; Pampos Haralambous 56'		12' Kosmas; 72' Kostakis Pierides

GSP Stadium, Nicosia

Cypriot Cup 1961–62 Winners
Anorthosis
3rd title

== Sources ==
- "1961/62 Cyprus Cup". RSSSF. 2017-08-24.

== Bibliography ==
- Gavreilides, Michalis; Papamoiseos, Stelios (2001). Ένας αιώνας Κυπριακό ποδόσφαιρο [One century Cypriot football] (in Greek). Nicosia: The writer. p. 63. ISBN 9963-8720-1-8.
- Meletiou, Giorgos (2011). Κυπριακό ποδόσφαιρο 1900–1960 [Cypriot Football 1900–1960] (in Greek). Nicosia: Power Publishing. pp. 233–234, 287. ISBN 978-9963-688-87-6.

== See also ==
- Cypriot Cup
- 1961–62 Cypriot First Division
