= 1966–67 Cypriot Second Division =

Cypriot Second Division
- Season: 1966–67
- Champions: ASIL Lysi (1st title)
- Promoted: ASIL Lysi

The 1966–67 Cypriot Second Division was the 12th season of the Cypriot second-level football league. ASIL Lysi won their 1st title.

== Format ==
Twelve teams participated in the 1966–67 Cypriot Second Division. The league was split to two geographical groups, depending from Districts of Cyprus each participated team came from. All teams of a group played against each other twice, once at their home and once away. The team with the most points at the end of the season crowned group champions. The winners of each group were playing against each other in the final phase of the competition and the winner were the champions of the Second Division. The champion was promoted to 1967–68 Cypriot First Division.

== Changes from previous season ==
Teams promoted to 1966–67 Cypriot First Division

- APOP Paphos FC

New members of CFA

- ASIL Lysi

Furthermore, PAEK returns to the league after 2 periods.

== Nicosia-Keryneia-Famagusta Group ==
League standings

Pos	Team	Pld	Pts	Qualification
1	ASIL Lysi (C, P)	14	40	Group Champions – Champions Playoffs
2	Enosis Neon Paralimni FC	14	39	
3	AEK Ammochostos	14	28	
4	Orfeas Nicosia	14	24	
5	PAEK	14	23	
6	ENAD Ayiou Dometiou FC	14	22	
7	Keravnos Strovolou FC	14	21	
8	Anagennisi Larnacas	14	13	

Rules for classification: 1) Points, 2) Goal differences, 3) Goal for. Points system: Won=3 points, Drawn=2 points, Lost=1 point
(C) Champions; (P) Promoted

== Limassol-Paphos Group ==
League standings

Pos	Team	Pld	Pts	Qualification
1	Evagoras Paphos	6	17	Group Champions – Champions Playoffs
2	Enosis Panelliniou-Antaeus Limassol	6	13	
3	Arion Lemesou	6	12	
4	Ethnikos Asteras Limassol	6	6	

Rules for classification: 1) Points, 2) Goal differences, 3) Goal for. Points system: Won=3 points, Drawn=2 points, Lost=1 point

== Champions Playoffs ==
- ASIL Lysi 4–1 Evagoras Paphos
- Evagoras Paphos 1–1 ASIL Lysi

ASIL Lysi were the champions of the Second Division. ASIL Lysi promoted to 1967–68 Cypriot First Division.

== See also ==
- Cypriot Second Division
- 1966–67 Cypriot First Division
- 1966–67 Cypriot Cup

== Sources ==
- "Τελική βαθμολογία Β΄ κατηγορίας". Philathlos (in Greek). 1967-04-24. p. 4.
- Cyprus Football Association (July 2014). "Το περιοδικό της ΚΟΠ" (PDF) (in Greek) (9). Nicosia: Cyprus Football Association: 76–79. Archived from the original (PDF) on 2015-08-31.
