= 1968–69 Cypriot Second Division =

Cypriot Second Division
- Season: 1968–69
- Champions: Enosis Neon Paralimni FC (1st title)
- Promoted: Enosis Neon Paralimni FC

The 1968–69 Cypriot Second Division was the 14th season of the Cypriot second-level football league. Enosis Neon Paralimni FC won their 1st title.

== Format ==
Thirteen teams participated in the 1968–79 Cypriot Second Division. All teams played against each other twice, once at their home and once away. The team with the most points at the end of the season crowned champions. The first team was promoted to 1969–70 Cypriot First Division. The champion was promoted to 1969–70 Cypriot First Division.

== League standings ==
Pos	Team	Pld	W	D	L	GF	GA	GD	Pts	Promotion
1	Enosis Neon Paralimni FC (C, P)	24	–	–	–	94	11	+83	65	Promoted to Cypriot First Division
2	Digenis Akritas Morphou FC	24	–	–	–	68	21	+47	62	
3	AEK Ammochostos	24	–	–	–	75	24	+51	59	
4	Arion Lemesou	24	–	–	–	49	25	+24	59	
5	PAEEK FC	24	–	–	–	57	50	+7	53	
6	Orfeas Nicosia	24	–	–	–	55	53	+2	51	
7	APOP Paphos FC	24	–	–	–	43	30	+13	49	
8	Enosis Panelliniou-Antaeus Limassol	24	–	–	–	57	47	+10	49	
9	Othellos Athienou FC	24	–	–	–	37	53	−16	41	
10	ENAD Ayiou Dometiou FC	24	–	–	–	37	61	−24	41	
11	Achilleas Kaimakli FC	24	–	–	–	23	65	−42	33	
12	Anagennisi Larnacas	24	–	–	–	26	102	−76	31	
13	AEM Morphou	24	–	–	–	13	89	−76	29	

Rules for classification: 1) Points, 2) Goal differences, 3) Goal for. Points system: Won=3 points, Drawn=2 points, Lost=1 point
(C) Champions; (P) Promoted

== See also ==
- Cypriot Second Division
- 1968–69 Cypriot First Division
- 1968–69 Cypriot Cup
