= 1956–57 Cypriot Second Division =

Cypriot Second Division
- Season: 1956–57
- Champions: Apollon (1st title)
- Promoted: Apollon

The 1956–57 Cypriot Second Division was the fourth season of the Cypriot second-level football league. Apollon Limassol won their 1st title.

== Format ==
Nine teams participated in the 1956–57 Cypriot Second Division. The league was split into two geographical groups, depending from which Districts of Cyprus each participated team came from. All teams of each group played against each other twice, once at their home and once away. The team with the most points at the end of the season were crowned group champions. The winners of each group played against each other in the final phase of the competition and the winner were the champions of the Second Division. The champion was promoted to the 1957–58 Cypriot First Division.

Teams received two points for a win, one point for a draw and zero points for a loss.

== Changes from previous season ==
Teams promoted to 1956–57 Cypriot First Division

- Aris Limassol

Teams relegated from 1955–56 Cypriot First Division

- Armenian Young Men's Association

New members of CFA

- Othellos Famagusta

== Stadiums and locations ==
Locations of the 1956–57 Cypriot Second Division teams.

| Group | Team | Stadium |
|---|---|---|
| Limassol-Paphos | Antaeus | GSO Stadium |
| Limassol-Paphos | Apollon | GSO Stadium |
| Limassol-Paphos | APOP | GSK Stadium |
| Limassol-Paphos | Panellinios | GSO Stadium |
| Nicosia-Famagusta-Larnaka-Keryneia | Alki | GSZ Stadium |
| Nicosia-Famagusta-Larnaka-Keryneia | AYMA | GSP Stadium |
| Nicosia-Famagusta-Larnaka-Keryneia | Othellos | GSE Stadium |
| Nicosia-Famagusta-Larnaka-Keryneia | Orfeas | GSP Stadium |
| Nicosia-Famagusta-Larnaka-Keryneia | PAEK | G.S. Praxander Stadium |

== Nicosia-Famagusta-Larnaca-Keryneia Group ==
League standings

| Pos | Team | Pld | W | D | L | GF | GA | GD | Pts | Qualification |
|---|---|---|---|---|---|---|---|---|---|---|
| 1 | Alki Larnaca | 8 | 6 | 2 | 0 | 23 | 9 | +14 | 14 | Advanced to Champions Playoff |
| 2 | Orfeas Nicosia | 8 | 6 | 1 | 1 | 22 | 8 | +14 | 13 | |
| 3 | Armenian Young Men's Association | 8 | 3 | 1 | 4 | 24 | 12 | +12 | 7 | |
| 4 | Othellos Famagusta | 8 | 3 | 0 | 5 | 13 | 26 | −13 | 6 | |
| 5 | PAEK | 8 | 0 | 0 | 8 | 6 | 33 | −27 | 0 | |

Results

| Home \ Away | ALK | AMN | OTL | ORF | PKK |
|---|---|---|---|---|---|
| Alki | | 1–1 | 5–1 | 2–1 | 2–0 (Note: The match Alki Larnaca-PAEK Kerynia awarded 2–0. PAEK Kerynia not showed at the match.) |
| AYMA | 1–3 | | 8–0 | 2–3 | 8–0 |
| Othellos | 1–3 | 2–0 (Note: The match Othellos Famagusta-AYMA awarded 2–0. AYMA not showed at the match.) | | 0–1 | 5–1 |
| Orfeas | 1–1 | 3–2 | 6–1 | | 2–0 (Note: The match Orfeas Nicosia-PAEK Kerynia awarded 2–0. PAEK Kerynia not showed at the match.) |
| PAEK | 3–6 | 0–2 | 2–3 | 0–5 | |

Legend: Blue = home team win; Yellow = draw; Red = away team win.

== Limassol-Paphos Group ==
League standings

| Pos | Team | Pld | W | D | L | GF | GA | GD | Pts | Qualification |
|---|---|---|---|---|---|---|---|---|---|---|
| 1 | Apollon Limassol (C, P) | 6 | 5 | 0 | 1 | 27 | 7 | +20 | 10 | Advanced to Champions Playoff |
| 2 | APOP Paphos | 6 | 3 | 1 | 2 | 16 | 21 | −5 | 7 | |
| 3 | Antaeus Limassol | 6 | 3 | 0 | 3 | 17 | 16 | +1 | 6 | |
| 4 | Panellinios Limassol | 6 | 0 | 1 | 5 | 8 | 24 | −16 | 1 | |

(C) Champions; (P) Promoted

Results

| Home \ Away | ANT | APL | APP | PNL |
|---|---|---|---|---|
| Antaeus | | 0–3 | 3–5 | 2–0 |
| Apollon | 0–2 | | 10–0 | 6–1 |
| APOP | 5–1 | 2–5 | | 2–0 |
| Panellinios | 3–9 | 2–3 | 2–2 | |

Legend: Blue = home team win; Yellow = draw; Red = away team win.

== Champions playoffs ==
- Apollon Limassol 4 – 1 Alki Larnaca (GSO Stadium, June 30, 1957)
- Alki Larnaca 2 – 2 Apollon Limassol (GSZ Stadium, July 7, 1956)

Apollon Limassol were the champions of the Second Division and they were promoted to 1957–58 Cypriot First Division.

== See also ==
- Cypriot Second Division
- 1956–57 Cypriot First Division

== Sources ==
- "Cyprus 1956/57". RSSSF.
