= 1955–56 Cypriot Second Division =

Cypriot Second Division
- Season: 1955–56
- Champions: Aris (2nd title)
- Promoted: Aris

The 1955–56 Cypriot Second Division was the third season of the Cypriot second-level football league. Aris Limassol won their 2nd title.

== Format ==
Eight teams participated in the 1955–56 Cypriot Second Division. The league was split into two geographical groups, depending from which Districts of Cyprus each participated team came from. All teams of each group played against each other twice, once at their home and once away. The team with the most points at the end of the season were crowned group champions. The winners of each group played against each other in the final phase of the competition and the winner were the champions of the Second Division. The champion was promoted to the 1956–57 Cypriot First Division.

Teams received two points for a win, one point for a draw and zero points for a loss.

== Changes from previous season ==
Teams promoted to 1955–56 Cypriot First Division

- Nea Salamis Famagusta

Teams relegated from 1954–55 Cypriot First Division

- Aris Limassol

New members of CFA

- Apollon Limassol

Members that withdrew from CFA

- Gençlik Gücü
- Gençler Birliği
- Mağusa Türk Gücü
- Doğan Türk Birliği

== Stadiums and locations ==
Locations of the 1955–56 Cypriot Second Division teams.

Group	Team	Stadium
Limassol-Paphos	Antaeus	GSO Stadium
Limassol-Paphos	Apollon	GSO Stadium
Limassol-Paphos	APOP	GSK Stadium
Limassol-Paphos	Aris	GSO Stadium
Limassol-Paphos	Panellinios	GSO Stadium
Nicosia-Larnaca-Keryneia	Alki	GSZ Stadium
Nicosia-Larnaca-Keryneia	Orfeas	GSP Stadium
Nicosia-Larnaca-Keryneia	PAEK	G.S. Praxander Stadium

== Nicosia-Larnaca-Keryneia Group ==
League standings

Pos	Team	Pld	W	D	L	GF	GA	GD	Pts	Qualification
1	Orfeas Nicosia	4	4	0	0	10	3	+7	8	Advanced to Champions Playoff
2	Alki Larnaca	4	1	0	3	10	8	+2	2	
3	PAEK	4	1	0	3	5	14	−9	2	

Results

Home \ Away	ALK	ORF	PKK
Alki		1–2	5–0
Orfeas	2–1		3–0
PAEK	4–3	1–3	

Legend: Blue = home team win; Yellow = draw; Red = away team win.

== Limassol-Paphos Group ==
League standings

Pos	Team	Pld	W	D	L	GF	GA	GD	Pts	Qualification
1	Aris Limassol (C, P)	8	6	2	0	31	9	+22	14	Advanced to Champions Playoff
2	Antaeus Limassol	8	6	1	1	21	10	+11	13	
3	Panellinios Limassol	8	2	3	3	20	23	−3	7	
4	APOP Paphos	8	2	2	4	21	22	−1	6	
5	Apollon Limassol	8	0	0	8	10	39	−29	0	

(C) Champions; (P) Promoted

Results

Home \ Away	ANT	APL	APP	ARS	PNL
Antaeus		2–1	4–2	0–0	5–2
Apollon	0–5		2–6	2–6	2–6
APOP	0–2	5–0		1–3	2–2
Aris	4–1	6–2	5–1		6–1
Panellinios	1–2	3–1	4–4	1–1	

Legend: Blue = home team win; Yellow = draw; Red = away team win.

== Champions Playoffs ==
- Aris Limassol 3 – 0 Orfeas Nicosia (GSO Stadium, June 3, 1956)
- Orfeas Nicosia 2 – 1 Aris Limassol (GSP Stadium (1902), June 10, 1956)

Aris Limassol were the champions of the Second Division and they were promoted to the 1956–57 Cypriot First Division.

== See also ==
- Cypriot Second Division
- 1955–56 Cypriot First Division
- 1955–56 Cypriot Cup

== Sources ==
- "Cyprus 1955/56". RSSSF.
