= 1953–54 Cypriot Second Division =

Cypriot Second Division
- Season: 1953–54
- Champions: Aris Limassol FC (1st title)
- Promoted: Aris Limassol FC

The 1953–54 Cypriot Second Division was the first season of the Cypriot second-level football league. Aris Limassol FC won their 1st title.

== Format ==
Nine teams participated in the 1953–54 Cypriot Second Division. The league was split to two geographical groups, depending from Districts of Cyprus each participated team came from. All teams of a group played against each other twice, once at their home and once away. The team with the most points at the end of the season crowned group champions. The winners of each group were playing against each other in the final phase of the competition and the winner were the champions of the Second Division. The champion was promoted to 1954–55 Cypriot First Division.

Teams received two points for a win, one point for a draw and zero points for a loss.

== Stadiums and locations ==
Locations of the 1953–54 Cypriot Second Division teams.

Group	Team	Stadium
Limassol-Paphos	Antaeus Limassol	GSO Stadium
Limassol-Paphos	APOP Paphos FC	GSK Stadium
Limassol-Paphos	Aris Limassol FC	GSO Stadium
Limassol-Paphos	Doğan Türk Birliği	GSO Stadium
Limassol-Paphos	Panellinios Limassol	GSO Stadium
Nicosia-Famagusta-Larnaca	Gençlik Gücü S.K.	GSP Stadium (1902)
Nicosia-Famagusta-Larnaca	Nea Salamis Famagusta FC	GSE Stadium
Nicosia-Famagusta-Larnaca	Demi Spor Larnaca	GSZ Stadium (1928)
Nicosia-Famagusta-Larnaca	Mağusa Türk Gücü S.K.	GSE Stadium

== Nicosia-Famagusta-Larnaca Group ==
League standings

Pos	Team	Pld	W	D	L	GF	GA	GD	Pts	Qualification
1	Gençler Birliği SK	6	5	1	0	31	8	+23	11	Group Champions – Champions Playoff
2	Nea Salamis Famagusta FC	6	4	1	1	23	11	+12	9	
3	Gençlik Gücü S.K.	6	2	0	4	13	23	−10	4	
4	Mağusa Türk Gücü S.K.	6	0	0	6	5	30	−25	0	

Rules for classification: 1) Points, 2) Goal differences, 3) Goal for. Points system: Won=2 points, Drawn=1 point, Lost=0 points.

Results

Home \ Away	GNL	NSL	DML	MGS
Gençlik Gücü		1–6	2–0	
Nea Salamis	5–1		2–2	5–2
Demi Spor Larnaca	8–2	5–3		
Mağusa Türk		0–2		

Legend: Blue = home team win; Yellow = draw; Red = away team win.

== Limassol-Paphos Group ==
Aris Limassol FC was the champions.

Results

Home \ Away	ANT	APP	ARS	PNL	DGN
Antaeus		6–1	1–1	1–0	2–0
APOP	4–3		3–0		
Aris	1–0			3–1	4–0
Panellinios			0–4		
Doğan Türk		0–0	1–1		

Legend: Blue = home team win; Yellow = draw; Red = away team win.

== Champions Playoffs ==
- Aris 3–2 Demi Spor Larnaca
- Demi Spor Larnaca 3–3 Aris

Aris Limassol were the champions of the Second Division. Aris Limassol promoted to 1954–55 Cypriot First Division.

== See also ==
- Cypriot Second Division
- 1953–54 Cypriot First Division
- 1953–54 Cypriot Cup
