= 1957–58 Cypriot Second Division =

Cypriot Second Division
- Season: 1957–58
- Champions: Orfeas Nicosia (1st title)
- Promoted: Orfeas Nicosia

The 1957–58 Cypriot Second Division was the fifth season of the Cypriot second-level football league. Orfeas Nicosia won their 1st title.

== Format ==
Nine teams participated in the 1956–57 Cypriot Second Division. The league was split to two geographical groups, depending from Districts of Cyprus each participated team came from. All teams of a group played against each other twice, once at their home and once away. The team with the most points at the end of the season crowned group champions. The winners of each group were playing against each other in the final phase of the competition and the winner were the champions of the Second Division. The champion was promoted to 1958–59 Cypriot First Division, but because was not held, the champions promoted to 1959–60 Cypriot First Division.

Teams received two points for a win, one point for a draw and zero points for a loss.

== Changes from previous season ==
Teams promoted to 1957–58 Cypriot First Division

- Apollon Limassol

New members of CFA

- Amathus Limassol
- Enosis Agion Omologiton

Furthermore, Antaeus Limassol was dissolved.

== Stadiums and locations ==
Locations of the 1957–58 Cypriot Second Division teams.

| Group | Team | Stadium |
|---|---|---|
| Limassol-Larnaca-Paphos | Alki Larnaca | GSZ Stadium (1928) |
| Limassol-Larnaca-Paphos | Amathus Limassol | GSO Stadium |
| Limassol-Larnaca-Paphos | APOP Paphos | GSK Stadium |
| Limassol-Larnaca-Paphos | Panellinios Limassol | GSO Stadium |
| Nicosia-Famagusta-Keryneia | Armenian Young Men's Association | GSP Stadium (1902) |
| Nicosia-Famagusta-Keryneia | Enosis Agion Omologiton | GSP Stadium (1902) |
| Nicosia-Famagusta-Keryneia | Othellos Famagusta | GSE Stadium |
| Nicosia-Famagusta-Keryneia | Orfeas Nicosia | GSP Stadium (1902) |
| Nicosia-Famagusta-Keryneia | PAEK | G.S. Praxander Stadium |

== Limassol-Larnaca-Paphos Group ==
Champions was Panellinios Limassol.

== Nicosia-Famagusta-Keryneia Group ==
Champions was Orfeas Nicosia.

== Champions Playoffs ==
Orfeas Nicosia won twice Panellinios Limassol with 2–0 and 2–1. Orfeas Nicosia were the champions of the Second Division. Orfeas Nicosia promoted to Cypriot First Division.

== See also ==
- Cypriot Second Division
- 1957–58 Cypriot First Division
