= 1959–60 Cypriot Second Division =

Cypriot Second Division
- Season: 1959–60
- Champions: Alki Larnaca FC (1st title)

The 1959–60 Cypriot Second Division was the sixth season of the Cypriot second-level football league. Alki Larnaca FC won their 1st title.

== Format ==
Nine teams participated in the 1959–60 Cypriot Second Division. The league was split to two geographical groups, depending from Districts of Cyprus each participated team came from. All teams of a group played against each other twice, once at their home and once away. The team with the most points at the end of the season crowned group champions. The winners of each group were playing against each other in the final phase of the competition and the winner were the champions of the Second Division.

Teams received two points for a win, one point for a draw and zero points for a loss.

== Stadiums and locations ==
Locations of the 1959–60 Cypriot Second Division teams.

Group	Team	Stadium
Limassol-Larnaca-Paphos	Alki Larnaca FC	GSZ Stadium (1928)
Limassol-Larnaca-Paphos	Amathus Limassol	GSO Stadium
Limassol-Larnaca-Paphos	APOP Paphos FC	GSK Stadium
Limassol-Larnaca-Paphos	Panellinios Limassol	GSO Stadium
Nicosia-Famagusta-Keryneia	Armenian Young Men's Association	GSP Stadium (1902)
Nicosia-Famagusta-Keryneia	Enosis Agion Omologiton	GSP Stadium (1902)
Nicosia-Famagusta-Keryneia	Othellos Famagusta	GSE Stadium
Nicosia-Famagusta-Keryneia	PAEK	G.S. Praxander Stadium

== Nicosia-Keryneia-Famagusta Group ==
Group champions was Enosis Agion Omologiton.

== Limassol-Larnaca-Paphos Group ==
Group champions was Alki Larnaca FC.

== Champions Playoff ==
- Enosis Agion Omologiton 1–6 Alki Larnaca FC (June 26, 1960, GSP Stadium (1902))
- Alki Larnaca FC 3–4 Enosis Agion Omologiton (June 29, 1960, GSZ Stadium (1928))

Alki Larnaca FC were the champions of the Second Division. Alki Larnaca FC promoted to Cypriot First Division after promotion playoffs with Aris Limassol FC.

== See also ==
- Cypriot Second Division
- 1959–60 Cypriot First Division
