= 1967–68 Cypriot Second Division =

Cypriot Second Division
- Season: 1967–68
- Champions: Evagoras Paphos (1st title)
- Promoted: Evagoras Paphos

The 1967–68 Cypriot Second Division was the 13th season of the Cypriot second-level football league. Evagoras Paphos won their 1st title.

== Format ==
Ten teams participated in the 1967–68 Cypriot Second Division. The league was split to two geographical groups, depending from Districts of Cyprus each participated team came from. All teams of a group played against each other twice, once at their home and once away. The team with the most points at the end of the season crowned group champions. The winners of each group were playing against each other in the final phase of the competition and the winner were the champions of the Second Division. The champion was promoted to 1968–69 Cypriot First Division.

== Nicosia-Keryneia-Famagusta Group ==
League standings

Pos	Team	Pld	W	D	L	GF	GA	GD	Pts	Qualification
1	Enosis Neon Paralimni FC	10	–	–	–	28	2	+26	30	Group Champions – Champions Playoffs
2	AEK Ammochostos	10	–	–	–	21	11	+10	25	
3	Orfeas Nicosia	10	–	–	–	24	15	+9	21	
4	PAEK	10	–	–	–	10	16	−6	17	
5	ENAD Ayiou Dometiou FC	10	–	–	–	7	22	−15	15	
6	Keravnos Strovolou FC	10	–	–	–	3	25	−22	7	

Rules for classification: 1) Points, 2) Goal differences, 3) Goal for. Points system: Won=3 points, Drawn=2 points, Lost=1 point

== Limassol-Paphos Group ==
League standings

Pos	Team	Pld	W	D	L	GF	GA	GD	Pts	Qualification
1	Evagoras Paphos (C, P)	6	–	–	–	27	3	+24	16	Group Champions – Champions Playoffs.
2	Enosis Panelliniou-Antaeus Limassol	6	–	–	–	18	7	+11	15	
3	Arion Lemesou	6	–	–	–	7	10	−3	11	
4	Ethnikos Asteras Limassol	6	–	–	–	5	37	−32	6	

Rules for classification: 1) Points, 2) Goal differences, 3) Goal for. Points system: Won=3 points, Drawn=2 points, Lost=1 point
(C) Champions; (P) Promoted

== Champions Playoffs ==
- Evagoras Paphos 0–0 Enosis Neon Paralimni FC
- Enosis Neon Paralimni FC 0–1 Evagoras Paphos

Evagoras Paphos were the champions of the Second Division. Evagoras Paphos promoted to 1968–69 Cypriot First Division.

== See also ==
- Cypriot Second Division
- 1967–68 Cypriot First Division
- 1967–68 Cypriot Cup

== Sources ==
- Cyprus Football Association (September 2014). "Το περιοδικό της ΚΟΠ" (PDF) (in Greek) (10). Nicosia: Cyprus Football Association: 77.
- "Πρωτάθλημα Β΄ κατηγορίας". Philathlos (in Greek). 1968-03-07.
