= 1970–71 Cypriot Cup =

Tournament details
- Country: Cyprus
- Dates: 1 May 1971 – 6 June 1971
- Teams: 16

Final positions
- Champions: Anorthosis Famagusta (5th title)
- Runners-up: AC Omonia

The 1970–71 Cypriot Cup was the 29th edition of the Cypriot Cup. A total of 16 clubs entered the competition. It began on 1 May 1971 with the first round and concluded on 6 June 1971 with the replay final which was held at GSE Stadium. Anorthosis Famagusta won their 5th Cypriot Cup trophy after beating Omonia 1–0 in the replay final.

== Format ==
In the 1970–71 Cypriot Cup, participated all the teams of the Cypriot First Division and 4 of 12 teams of the Cypriot Second Division (first four of the league table; cup took place after the end of the league).

The competition consisted of four knock-out rounds. In all rounds each tie was played as a single leg and was held at the home ground of one of the two teams, according to the draw results. Each tie winner was qualifying to the next round. If a match was drawn, extra time was following. If extra time was drawn, there was a replay at the ground of the team who were away for the first game. If the rematch was also drawn, then extra time was following and if the match remained drawn after extra time the winner was decided by penalty shoot-out.

The cup winner secured a place in the 1971–72 European Cup Winners' Cup.

== First round ==
Team 1	Result	Team 2
(A) Anorthosis Famagusta	7 - 1	AEL Limassol (A)
(A) Apollon Limassol	0 - 1	Alki Larnaca (A)
(B) APOP Paphos	0 - 6	APOEL (A)
(B) Aris Limassol	3 - 0	AEM Morphou (B)
(A) Digenis Akritas Morphou	1 - 2	Nea Salamis Famagusta (A)
(A) Olympiakos Nicosia	7 - 1	ASIL Lysi (A)
(A) AC Omonia	2 - 0	Pezoporikos Larnaca (A)
(A) Enosis Neon Paralimni	4 - 0	Othellos Athienou (B)

== Quarter-finals ==
Team 1	Result	Team 2
(A) Alki Larnaca	0 - 1	Enosis Neon Paralimni (A)
(A) APOEL	2 - 0	Aris Limassol (B)
(A) Olympiakos Nicosia	1 - 2	AC Omonia (A)
(A) Nea Salamis Famagusta	0 - 0, 1 - 2	Anorthosis Famagusta (A)

== Semi-finals ==
Team 1	Result	Team 2
(A) Anorthosis Famagusta	4 - 1	APOEL (A)
(A) Enosis Neon Paralimni	1 - 4	AC Omonia (A)

== Final ==
30 May 1971

Omonia	1–1 (a.e.t.)	Anorthosis Famagusta
Sotiris Kaiafas 22'		Giorgos Panagides 28'

GSP Stadium, Nicosia

Because the match ended in a draw after the extra time, a replay match was played.

6 June 1971

Anorthosis Famagusta	1–0 (a.e.t.)	Omonia
Giorgos Panagides 105'

GSE Stadium, Famagusta

Cypriot Cup 1970–71 Winners
Anorthosis Famagusta
5th title

== Sources ==
- "1970/71 Cyprus Cup". Rec.Sport.Soccer Statistics Foundation. 2017-08-24.

== Bibliography ==
- Gavreilides, Michalis; Papamoiseos, Stelios (2001). Ένας αιώνας Κυπριακό ποδόσφαιρο [One century Cypriot football] (in Greek). Nicosia: The writer. pp. 88–89. ISBN 9963-8720-1-8.
- Stephanidis, Giorgos (2003). 40 χρόνια κυπριακές ομάδες στην Ευρώπη [40 years Cypriot teams in Europe] (in Greek). Nicosia: Haravgi. p. 62. ISBN 9963-8841-1-3.

== See also ==
- Cypriot Cup
- 1970–71 Cypriot First Division
