= 1960–61 Cypriot Second Division =

Cypriot Second Division
- Season: 1960–61
- Champions: Enosis Agion Omologiton (1st title)

The 1960–61 Cypriot Second Division was the seventh season of the Cypriot second-level football league. Enosis Agion Omologiton won their 1st title.

== Format ==
Nine teams participated in the 1960–61 Cypriot Second Division. The league was split to two geographical groups, depending from Districts of Cyprus each participated team came from. All teams of a group played against each other twice, once at their home and once away. The team with the most points at the end of the season crowned group champions. The winners of each group were playing against each other in the final phase of the competition and the winner were the champions of the Second Division.

Teams received three points for a win, two points for a draw and one point for a loss.

== Nicosia-Keryneia-Famagusta Group ==
Participating teams: Enosis Agion Omologiton, AEK Ammochostos, Othellos Famagusta and PAEEK FC. Group champions was Enosis Agion Omologiton.

== Limassol-Larnaca-Paphos Group ==
Participating teams: Amathus Limassol, APOP Paphos FC, Panellinios Limassol, Ethnikos Asteras Limassol and Anagennisi Larnacas. Group champions was Panellinios Limassol.

== Champions Playoff ==
- Panellinios Limassol 5–6 Enosis Agion Omologiton
- Enosis Agion Omologiton 3–2 Panellinios Limassol

== See also ==
- Cypriot Second Division
- 1960–61 Cypriot First Division
