= 1974–75 Cypriot Cup =

Tournament details
- Country: Cyprus
- Dates: 28 May 1975 – 6 July 1975
- Teams: 16

Final positions
- Champions: Anorthosis Famagusta (6th title)
- Runners-up: Enosis Neon Paralimni

The 1974–75 Cypriot Cup was the 33rd edition of the Cypriot Cup. A total of 16 clubs entered the competition. It began on 28 May 1975 with the first round and concluded on 6 July 1975 with the final which was held at GSP Stadium. Anorthosis Famagusta won their 6th Cypriot Cup trophy after beating Enosis Neon Paralimni 3–2 in the final.

== Format ==
Due to the Turkish invasion participation was limited to the 14 Cypriot First Division teams, the champion team of the 1974–75 Special mixed championship Second–Third Division and APOEL. APOEL participated unofficially in the 1974–75 Cypriot First Division, and their matches did not count towards the official league table.

The competition consisted of four knock-out rounds. In all rounds each tie was played as a single leg and was held at the home ground of one of the two teams, according to the draw results. Each tie winner was qualifying to the next round. If a match was drawn, extra time was following. If extra time was drawn, there was a replay at the ground of the team who were away for the first game. If the rematch was also drawn, then extra time was following and if the match remained drawn after extra time the winner was decided by penalty shoot-out.

The cup winner secured a place in the 1975–76 European Cup Winners' Cup.

== First round ==
8 clubs from the 1976–77 Cypriot First Division, 7 clubs from the 1976–77 Cypriot Second Division and 7 clubs from the 1976–77 Cypriot Third Division were added.

Team 1	Result	Team 2
(A) AEL Limassol	1 - 0	Digenis Akritas Morphou (A)
(A) Alki Larnaca	1 - 0	Aris Limassol (A)
(A) Anorthosis Famagusta	7 - 1	ASIL Lysi (A)
(A) Apollon Limassol	2 - 0	APOP Paphos (B)
(A) Evagoras Paphos	1 - 0	Pezoporikos Larnaca (A)
(A) AC Omonia	2 - 2 (6 - 4 pen.)	Olympiakos Nicosia (A)
(A) Enosis Neon Paralimni	2 - 0	APOEL FC
(A) Nea Salamis Famagusta	1 - 1 (5 - 3 pen.)	EPA Larnaca (A)

== Quarter-finals ==
Team 1	Result	Team 2
(A) Anorthosis Famagusta	2 - 2 (10 - 9 pen.)	Alki Larnaca (A)
(A) Evagoras Paphos	0 - 1	Apollon Limassol (A)
(A) AC Omonia	4 - 0	AEL Limassol (A)
(A) Nea Salamis Famagusta	0 - 2	Enosis Neon Paralimni (A)

== Semi-finals ==
Team 1	Result	Team 2
(A) Apollon Limassol	0 - 1	Anorthosis Famagusta (A)
(A) AC Omonia	2 - 2 (4 - 5 pen.)	Enosis Neon Paralimni (A)

== Final ==
6 July 1975

Anorthosis Famagusta	3–2	Enosis Neon Paralimni FC
Giannakis Mantis 54'; Fivos Vrahimis 80' (pen.); Artemis Theocharous 86'		30' Giorgos Vlittis; 63' Loukas Papaloukas

GSP Stadium (1902), Nicosia

Cypriot Cup 1974–75 Winners
Anorthosis Famagusta
6th title

== Sources ==
- "1974/75 Cyprus Cup". Rec.Sport.Soccer Statistics Foundation. 2017-08-24.

== Bibliography ==
- Gavreilides, Michalis; Papamoiseos, Stelios (2001). Ένας αιώνας Κυπριακό ποδόσφαιρο [One century Cypriot football] (in Greek). Nicosia: The writer. pp. 96–97. ISBN 9963-8720-1-8.
- Stephanidis, Giorgos (2003). 40 χρόνια κυπριακές ομάδες στην Ευρώπη [40 years Cypriot teams in Europe] (in Greek). Nicosia: Haravgi. p. 85. ISBN 9963-8841-1-3.

== See also ==
- Cypriot Cup
- 1974–75 Cypriot First Division
