= 1953–54 Cypriot Cup =

Tournament details
- Country: Cyprus
- Dates: 8 May 1954 – 27 June 1954
- Teams: 18

Final positions
- Champions: Çetinkaya Türk (2nd title)
- Runners-up: Pezoporikos

The 1953–54 Cypriot Cup was the 17th edition of the Cypriot Cup. A total of 18 clubs entered the competition. It began on 8 May 1954 with the first preliminary round and concluded on 27 June 1954 with the final at GSP Stadium. Çetinkaya Türk won their 2nd Cypriot Cup trophy after beating Pezoporikos 2–1 in the final.

== Format ==
In the 1953–54 Cypriot Cup, participated the 9 teams of the Cypriot First Division and the 9 teams of the Cypriot Second Division.

The First Division teams and the two winners of each group of Second Division began from first round. The rest 5 teams of Second Division played three preliminary rounds and the winner participated to the first round. The draw between the five teams took place so that in the third qualifying round a team from each group would participated.

The competition consisted of seven knock-out rounds. In all rounds each tie was played as a single leg and was held at the home ground of one of the two teams, according to the draw results. Each tie winner was qualifying to the next round. If a match was drawn, extra time was following. If extra time was drawn, there was a replay match.

== First preliminary round ==
Team 1	Result	Team 2
(B) Mağusa Türk Gücü	4 - 1	Gençlik Gücü (B)
(B) Panellinios Limassol	2 - 5	Doğan Türk Birliği (B)

== Second preliminary round ==
Team 1	Result	Team 2
(B) Doğan Türk Birliği	2 - 0	APOP Paphos (B)

== Third preliminary round ==
Team 1	Result	Team 2
(B) Mağusa Türk Gücü	3 - 2	Doğan Türk Birliği (B)

== First round ==
Team 1	Result	Team 2
(A) AEL	3 - 1	Olympiakos (A)
(A) Anorthosis	8 - 5	AYMA (A)
(B) Apollon	1 - 5	Pezoporikos (A)
(A) Omonia	2 - 2, 3 - 0	EPA (A)
(B) Mağusa Türk Gücü	2 - 6	Demi Spor Larnaca (B)
(A) Çetinkaya Türk	7 - 1	Aris (B)
(A) APOEL	Bye
(B) Nea Salamis	Bye

== Quarter-finals ==
Team 1	Result	Team 2
(A) Anorthosis	4 - 2	Omonia (A)
(A) Pezoporikos	6 - 2	AEL (A)
(B) Nea Salamis	8 - 5	Demi Spor Larnaca (B)
(A) Çetinkaya Türk	2 - 1	APOEL (A)

== Semi-finals ==
Team 1	Result	Team 2
(B) Nea Salamis^{1}	0 - 1	Pezoporikos (A)
(A) Çetinkaya Türk	3 - 1	Anorthosis Famagusta (A)

^{1}Nea Salamis were the first second division club to reach the semifinals.

== Final ==
27 June 1954

Çetinkaya Türk	2 – 1	Pezoporikos
Ertogan Asarntag 16'; Vetat Shialich (Jipsis) 58'		60' Andreas Papadopoulos

GSP Stadium, Nicosia
Referee: Ben Roupi

Cypriot Cup 1953–54 Winners
Çetinkaya Türk
2nd title

== Sources ==
- "1953/54 Cyprus Cup". RSSSF. 2017-08-24.

== Bibliography ==
- Gavreilides, Michalis; Papamoiseos, Stelios (2001). Ένας αιώνας Κυπριακό ποδόσφαιρο [One century Cypriot football] (in Greek). Nicosia: The writer. p. 59. ISBN 9963-8720-1-8.
- Meletiou, Giorgos (2011). Κυπριακό ποδόσφαιρο 1900–1960 [Cypriot Football 1900–1960] (in Greek). Nicosia: Power Publishing. pp. 190–191, 287. ISBN 978-9963-688-87-6.

== See also ==
- Cypriot Cup
- 1953–54 Cypriot First Division
