= 1974–75 Special mixed championship Second–Third Division =

Cypriot Second Division
- Season: 1974–75
- Champions: APOP Paphos FC (4th title)

The 1974–75 Cypriot Second Division was the 20th season of the Cypriot second-level football league. APOP Paphos FC won their 4th title.

== Format ==
Due to the Turkish invasion of Cyprus which forced many teams that had their headquarters to the north Cyprus to be closed temporarily or permanently, CFA decided to have a Special mixed championship of Second & Third Division. In this championship could participate all the teams of the Second and Third Division. Participation was optional. The championship had two geographical groups. The winners of each group were playing against each other in the final phase and the winners were the champions of the league. The winner was considered as the 1974–75 Cypriot Second Division champions.

== Nicosia-Keryneia Group ==
=== League standings ===
Pos	Team	Pld	W	D	L	GF	GA	GD	Pts	Qualification
1	Ethnikos Assia FC	18	–	–	–	38	16	+22	25	Qualification for champions play-off
2	PAEEK FC	18	–	–	–	35	19	+16	24	
3	Achilleas Kaimakli FC	18	–	–	–	30	19	+11	22	
4	Keravnos Strovolou FC	18	–	–	–	45	26	+19	20	
5	Parthenon Zodeia	18	–	–	–	40	29	+11	18	
6	Orfeas Nicosia	18	–	–	–	24	24	0	18	
7	ENAD Ayiou Dometiou FC	18	–	–	–	26	27	−1	17	
8	AEM Morphou	18	–	–	–	27	41	−14	17	
9	Doxa Katokopias FC	18	–	–	–	19	35	−16	14	
10	Iraklis Gerolakkou	18	–	–	–	17	65	−48	5	

Rules for classification: 1) Points, 2) Goal differences, 3) Goal for. Points system: Won=2 points, Drawn=1 point, Lost=0 points.

== Larnaca-Limassol-Paphos ==
=== League standings ===
Pos	Team	Pld	W	D	L	GF	GA	GD	Pts	Qualification
1	APOP Paphos FC	16	–	–	–	52	17	+35	25	Qualification for champions play-off
2	Akritas Chlorakas	16	–	–	–	43	18	+25	25	
3	Ermis Aradippou FC	16	–	–	–	38	18	+20	21	
4	Chalkanoras Idaliou	16	–	–	–	36	22	+14	21	
5	Omonia Aradippou	16	–	–	–	35	22	+13	20	
6	Ethnikos Achna FC	16	–	–	–	29	38	−9	11	
7	Othellos Athienou FC	16	–	–	–	18	29	−11	11	
8	Ethnikos Asteras Limassol	16	–	–	–	23	50	−27	7	
9	Anagennisi Deryneia FC	16	–	–	–	23	83	−60	3	

Rules for classification: 1) Points, 2) Goal differences, 3) Goal for. Points system: Won=2 points, Drawn=1 point, Lost=0 points.

== Champions playoff ==
The two group champions team, APOP Paphos FC and Ethnikos Assia FC faced each other in a two-legged relegation play-off for the championship.. APOP Paphos FC won both matches.

- Ethnikos Assia FC 2–3 APOP Paphos FC
- APOP Paphos FC 4–0 Ethnikos Assia FC

== See also ==
- Cypriot Second Division
- 1974–75 Cypriot First Division
- 1974–75 Cypriot Cup
