= Cypriot Second Division =

- Organising body: Cyprus Football Association
- Founded: 1934 (Unofficial); 1953; 73 years ago (Official)
- Country: Cyprus
- Confederation: UEFA
- Number of clubs: 16
- Level on pyramid: 2
- Promotion to: Cypriot First Division
- Relegation to: Cypriot Third Division
- Domestic cup: Cypriot Cup
- Current champions: Nea Salamis (5th title) (2025–26)
- Most championships: APOP (6 titles); Evagoras (6 titles)
- Website: www.cfa.com.cy
- Current: 2026–27 Cypriot Second Division

The Cypriot Second Division (Greek: Πρωτάθλημα Β΄ Κατηγορίας) is the second highest football division of the Cypriot football league system.

Administered by the Cyprus Football Association, it is contested by 16 teams, with the top three teams being promoted to the Cypriot First Division and the last three teams being relegated to the Cypriot Third Division.

== History ==
The Cypriot Second Division started unofficially the 1934–35 football season as the second level of the Cypriot football (Cyprus Football Association founded in 1934). The competition consisted of teams that didn't participate in Cypriot First Division and the reserve teams of the Cypriot First Division clubs. In the reserve teams were allowed to participate only players that had no more than three caps with their team in First Division. The reserve teams won all the titles of the unofficial period.

The first official second division championship was held in the 1953–54 season, after the unification of Cypriot Football, without the presence of the reserve teams. From that season, the reserve teams were participate in the new Reserve Teams Championship.

Almost every team that participated and still participate in the Cypriot First Division had also participated in the Second Division, with only exceptions to be APOEL and Omonia. Pezoporikos Larnaca and Trust were also two teams that never played to Second Division but both do not exist anymore. Çetinkaya Türk also never participated in Second Division but the team withdrew from CFA in 1954. Many teams with multiple participations in the Cypriot First Division had also played in the Second Division, like AEL Limassol, Nea Salamis Famagusta, Apollon Limassol, Olympiakos Nicosia, AEK Larnaca, Enosis Neon Paralimni and EPA Larnaca.

Anorthosis Famagusta also participated in the Second Division during 1945–46 season (unofficial competition), because they withdrew from CFA eight years earlier and disbanded their football team. After their reform and their re-integration in the CFA, they were forced to play in the Second Division in order to be promoted to the First Division. It was the only time from the unofficial period of the competition that a team promoted from the Second Division to the First Division.

Since 1952–53 season, the second Division teams took part in the Cypriot Cup, except of the 1963–64 season. In some seasons during the 1960s and 1970s only the leading teams of the Second Division took part (some times only the champion) in the competition. From 1975–76 season all the teams of the Cypriot Second Division take part in the Cypriot Cup. No Second Division team ever reach the final but they qualified for the semi-finals four times (Nea Salamis Famagusta in 1953–54, Orfeas Nicosia in 1983–84, PAEEK in 1984–85 and AEP Paphos in 2005–06).

== Structure ==
The structure of the championship was changed some times. From 1953–54 until 1967–68 the championship was split to two or three geographical groups, depending from Districts of Cyprus each participated team came from. The winners of each group were playing against each other in the final phase of the competition and the winner were the champions of the Second Division.

The championship was held for the first time as a single division in the 1968–69 season. All the teams played against each other twice, once at their home and once away. The team with the most points at the end of the season crowned champions. This is the league's current format until present time. Exceptions were:

1. The 1974–75 season, due to the Turkish invasion of Cyprus which forced many teams that had their headquarters to the north Cyprus to be closed temporarily or permanently, CFA decided to have a Special mixed championship of Second & Third Division. In this championship could participate all the teams of the Second and Third Division. Participation was optional. The championship had two geographical groups. The winners of each group were playing against each other in the final phase and the winners were the champions of the league. The winner was considered as the 1974–75 Cypriot Second Division champions.
2. The 1994–95 season, the league consisted of three rounds. In the first two rounds all teams played against each other twice, once at their home and once away. The home teams for the third round matches were determined based on their league table position after the end of the second round.
3. The 2009–10, 2010–11, 2011–12 and 2012–13 seasons, each team played against each other twice, once at home and once away. After these matches, the first four teams qualified for the Promotion Group. At the Promotion Group every team played each other twice, once at home and once away. The teams with the best records were promoted to First Division. Regular season records were carried over without any modifications.
4. The 2013–14 season, the league was split into a two tier system, Group B1 and Group B2 with 8 teams participating in each division. All the teams played (of each group) against each other four times, twice at home and twice away. The first two teams of Group B1 were promoted to the Cypriot First Division, while the first two teams of Group B2 were promoted to Group B1. The last four teams of Group B1 were relegated to Group B2, while the last four teams of Group B2 were relegated to the Cypriot Third Division. However, after the end of the season Cyprus Football Association merged the two groups, creating a unified Second Division. So all the teams that were relegated from B1 to B2 and the teams that promoted from B2 to B1 participated in the new unified Second Division. The two groups were not at the same level, as Group B1 was above Group B2. Second Division Champions of that season was considered the winner of Group B1.

=== Current format (Since 2022–23) ===
Sixteen clubs are competing in the league, facing each other at least once (either at home or away). Afterwards, the table split into two groups, with the top eight teams entering the promotion round and the bottom eight teams entering the relegation round. The champion, 2nd and 3rd placed teams are promoted to the Cypriot First Division, whilst the bottom three are relegated to the Cypriot Third Division.

=== Points system ===
The points system of the Cypriot Second Division changed three times during the years: From 1953–54 until 1959–60 season, teams were awarded two points for a win, one point for a draw and zero points for a defeat. From 1960–61 until 1969–70 season, teams were awarded three points for a win, two points for a draw and one point for a defeat. From 1970–71 until 1990–91 season, teams were awarded two points for a win, one point for a draw and zero points for a defeat. Since 1991–92 season (until present time), teams are awarded three points for a win, one point for a draw and zero points for a defeat.

== Teams ==
The 16 teams which participate in the 2026-27 season of the Cypriot Second Division are:

- AEP Polemidion
- Akritas Chlorakas
- Anagennisi Deryneia
- APEA Akrotiriou
- ASIL Lysi
- Ayia Napa
- Chalkanoras Idaliou
- Digenis Akritas Morphou
- Doxa Katokopias
- Enosis Neon Paralimni
- Ermis Aradippou
- Ethnikos Achnas
- Iraklis Gerolakkou
- MEAP Nisou
- PAEEK
- Spartakos Kitiou

== Winners (unofficial competition: 1935–1953) ==
The table presents the winners of the competition during the period 1935–1953, in which the competition was unofficial. During that period, the league consisted of the reserve teams of the Cypriot First Division clubs (which won all the titles) and other teams that didn't participate in the First Division.

The period 1941–1944 the championship was not held due to World War II. Many Cypriots were volunteer enlisted in the Greek and English army, and also formed a Cypriot constitution. Most teams have undertaken national project by collecting money and clothing to be sent to Greece in order to assist the Greek people and the army. Moreover, many Greek refugees fled to Cyprus. Due to the prevailed war conditions the CFA decided to suspend all the competitions.

Season	Winner
1934–35	APOEL (reserve team)
1935–36	Trust (reserve team)
1936–37	APOEL (reserve team)
1937–38	APOEL (reserve team)
1938–39	APOEL (reserve team)

Season	Winner
1939–40	APOEL (reserve team)
1944–45	EPA Larnaca (reserve team)
1945–46	APOEL (reserve team)
1946–47	APOEL (reserve team)
1947–48	APOEL (reserve team)

Season	Winner
1948–49	APOEL (reserve team)
1949–50	APOEL (reserve team)
1950–51	AEL Limassol (reserve team)
1951–52	Çetinkaya Türk (reserve team)
1952–53	APOEL (reserve team)

== Winners ==
The table presents all the winners since the 1953–54 season, when the competition officially began.

Season	Winner
1953–54	Aris Limassol
1954–55	Nea Salamis Famagusta
1955–56	Aris Limassol
1956–57	Apollon Limassol
1957–58	Orfeas Nicosia
1958–59	Not held^{1}
1959–60	Alki Larnaca
1960–61	Enosis Agion Omologiton
1961–62	Panellinios Limassol
1962–63	Panellinios Limassol
1963–64	Not held^{2}
1964–65	Orfeas Nicosia
1965–66	APOP Paphos
1966–67	ASIL Lysi
1967–68	Evagoras Paphos
1968–69	Enosis Neon Paralimni
1969–70	Digenis Akritas Morphou
1970–71	APOP Paphos
1971–72	Evagoras Paphos
1972–73	APOP Paphos
1973–74	ASIL Lysi
1974–75	APOP Paphos
1975–76	Chalkanoras Idaliou
1976–77	APOP Paphos
1977–78	Omonia Aradippou
1978–79	Keravnos
1979–80	Nea Salamis Famagusta

Season	Winner
1980–81	Evagoras Paphos
1981–82	Alki Larnaca
1982–83	Ermis Aradippou
1983–84	Olympiakos Nicosia
1984–85	Ermis Aradippou
1985–86	Ethnikos Achna
1986–87	APEP
1987–88	Keravnos
1988–89	Evagoras Paphos
1989–90	EPA Larnaca
1990–91	Evagoras Paphos
1991–92	Ethnikos Achna
1992–93	Omonia Aradippou
1993–94	Aris Limassol
1994–95	Evagoras Paphos
1995–96	APOP Paphos
1996–97	AEL Limassol
1997–98	Olympiakos Nicosia
1998–99	Anagennisi Deryneia
1999–00	Digenis Akritas Morphou
2000–01	Alki Larnaca
2001–02	Nea Salamis Famagusta
2002–03	Anagennisi Deryneia
2003–04	Nea Salamis Famagusta
2004–05	APOP Kinyras
2005–06	AEP Paphos
2006–07	APOP Kinyras

Season	Winner
2007–08	AEP Paphos
2008–09	Ermis Aradippou
2009–10	Alki Larnaca
2010–11	Aris Limassol
2011–12	Ayia Napa
2012–13	Aris Limassol
2013–14^{3}	Ayia Napa
2014–15	Enosis Neon Paralimni
2015–16	Karmiotissa Pano Polemidion
2016–17	Alki Oroklini
2017–18	Enosis Neon Paralimni
2018–19	Ethnikos Achna
2019–20	Interrupted^{4}
2020–21	PAEEK
2021–22	Karmiotissa Pano Polemidion
2022–23	Othellos Athienou
2023–24	Omonia Aradippou
2024–25	Krasava ENY Ypsonas
2025–26	Nea Salamis Famagusta
2026–27	

^{1}Championship not held due to the unstable situation in Cyprus during EOKA fight.

^{2}Championship not held due Bloody Christmas (1963).

^{3}The 2013–14 season the league was split into a two tier system, Group B1 and Group B2. The two groups were not at the same level, as Group B1 was above Group B2. Second Division Champions of that season was considered the winner of Group B1, Ayia Napa. Winner of Group B2 was Karmiotissa Pano Polemidion.

^{4}The 2019–20 season the league was interrupted due to the Covid-19 pandemic

Notes:

- Following a decision by the Executive Committee of the Cyprus Football Association (CFA/KOP), upon the opinion of its legal advisor, on 19 June 2025, a request by AEK Larnaca was approved for the recognition of the titles of EPA Larnaca and Pezoporikos Larnaca in the name of AEK Larnaca.

== Performance By Club ==
Club	Winners	Winning seasons
APOP Paphos	6	1965–66, 1970–71, 1972–73, 1974–75, 1976–77, 1995–96
Evagoras Paphos	6	1967–68, 1971–72, 1980–81, 1988–89, 1990–91, 1994–95
Aris Limassol	5	1953–54, 1955–56, 1993–94, 2010–11, 2012–13
Nea Salamis Famagusta	5	1954–55, 1979–80, 2001–02, 2003–04, 2025–26
Alki Larnaca	4	1959–60, 1981–82, 2000–01, 2009–10
Enosis Neon Paralimni	3	1968–69, 2014–15, 2017–18
Omonia Aradippou	3	1977–78, 1992–93, 2023–24
Ermis Aradippou	3	1982–83, 1984–85, 2008–09
Ethnikos Achna	3	1985–86, 1991–92, 2018–19
Orfeas Nicosia	2	1957–58, 1964–65
Panellinios Limassol	2	1961–62, 1962–63
ASIL Lysi	2	1966–67, 1973–74
Digenis Akritas Morphou	2	1969–70, 1999–2000
Keravnos Strovolou	2	1978–79, 1987–88
Olympiakos Nicosia	2	1983–84, 1997–98
Anagennisi Deryneia	2	1998–99, 2002–03
APOP Kinyras	2	2004–05, 2006–07
AEP Paphos	2	2005–06, 2007–08
Ayia Napa	2	2011–12, 2013–14
Karmiotissa FC	2	2015–16, 2021–22
Apollon Limassol	1	1956–57
Enosis Agion Omologiton	1	1960–61
Chalkanoras Idaliou	1	1975–76
APEP	1	1986–87
AEK Larnaca (Note: Includes wins and runner-ups of EPA Larnaca FC and Pezoporikos Larnaca FC until 1994.)	1	1989–90
AEL Limassol	1	1996–97
Alki Oroklini	1	2016–17
PAEEK	1	2020–21
Othellos Athienou	1	2022–23
Krasava ENY Ypsonas	1	2024–25

Notes:

- Following a decision by the Executive Committee of the Cyprus Football Association (CFA/KOP), upon the opinion of its legal advisor, on 19 June 2025, a request by AEK Larnaca was approved for the recognition of the titles of EPA Larnaca and Pezoporikos Larnaca in the name of AEK Larnaca.

== Appearances in the second division ==
The below table indicates the total number of seasons each club has participated in the Cypriot Second Division since 1953-54 up to and including the 2026-27 season.

98 teams have played at least one season in the Cypriot Second Division.

Teams in bold are participating in the 2026-27 Cypriot Second Division.

Team	Participations
**PAEEK**	55
**Chalkanoras Idaliou**	39
Omonia Aradippou	38
**Akritas Chlorakas**	37
Othellos Athienou	35
**Anagennisi Deryneia**	35
Orfeas Nicosia	33
**ASIL Lysi**	29
**Ermis Aradippou**	29
Onisilos Sotira	27
APOP Paphos	26
**Digenis Akritas Morphou**	26
**Doxa Katokopias**	25
Ethnikos Assia	24
Keravnos	21
APEP	21
**Ayia Napa**	21
AEZ Zakakiou	20
THOI Lakatamia	20
**Ethnikos Achna**	19
Evagoras Paphos	19
Aris Limassol	18
AEM Morphou	16
Alki Larnaca	15
Adonis Idaliou	12
AEK Ammochostos	12
ENAD Ayiou Dometiou	12
**Iraklis Gerolakkou**	12
**MEAP Nisou**	12
Olympiakos Nicosia	11
Ethnikos Asteras Limassol	10
**Enosis Neon Paralimni**	9
Nea Salamis Famagusta	9

Team	Participations
Panellinios Limassol	9
Anagennisi Larnacas	8
Karmiotissa	8
Apollon Lympion	7
Elpida Xylofagou	7
EPAL	7
Parthenon Zodeia	7
Amathus Limassol	6
Digenis Akritas Ipsona	6
Neos Aionas Trikomou	6
P.O. Xylotymbou	6
Alki Oroklini	5
Anagennisi Germasogeias	5
Arion Lemesou	5
Digenis Oroklinis	5
Enosis Neon Parekklisia	5
Krasava ENY	5
Othellos Famagusta	5
Achyronas-Onisilos FC	4
AEK/Achilleas Ayiou Theraponta	4
AEP Paphos	4
Antaeus Limassol	4
APEP Pelendriou	4
Atromitos Yeroskipou	4
ENAD Polis Chrysochous	4
Ethnikos Defteras	4
Nikos & Sokratis Erimis	4
Omonia 29M	4
Onisilos Sotira	4
Achilleas Kaimakli	3
Achyronas Liopetriou	3
APOP Kinyras	3
AYMA	3

Team	Participations
Enosis Agion Omologiton	3
Enosis Kokkinotrimithia	3
Kentro Neotitas Maroniton	3
Peyia 2014	3
Rotsidis Mammari	3
SEK Agiou Athanasiou	3
**Spartakos Kitiou**	3
**APEA Akrotiri**	2
Apollon Limassol	2
Demi Spor Larnaca	2
Doğan Türk Birliği	2
Ethnikos Latsion	2
Gaydzak Nicosia	2
Gençlik Gücü	2
LALL Lysi	2
Mağusa Türk Gücü	2
Olympias Lympion	2
Omonia Psevda	2
Orfeas Athienou	2
Pafos FC	2
AEK Kakopetrias	1
AEK Kouklia	1
AEK Larnaca	1
AEL Limassol	1
AEM Mesogis	1
**AEP Polemidion**	1
Apollon Athienou	1
EPA Larnaca	1
Frenaros FC	1
Kinyras Empas	1
Kouris Erimis	1
Olympos Xylofagou	1

Notes:

- Reference data is up until 2022/23, but the table above is until 2026/27
- PAEEK has 15 participations as PAEK, 3 participations as PAEK/AEK and 36 participations as PAEEK.
- APEP has 3 participations as APEP Limassol and 18 participations as APEP Pitsilias.
- Keravnos has some participations as Enosis-Keravnos.
- Krasava ENY used to be called up until 2019 as Enosi Neon Ypsona-Digenis

== See also ==
- Football in Cyprus
- Cypriot football league system
- Cypriot First Division
- Cypriot Third Division
- STOK Elite Division
- Cypriot Cup

== Sources ==
- Στεφανίδης, Γιώργος (2013-09-23). "ΡΕΤΡΟ – Η ιστορία της Β' Κατηγορίας" (in Greek). Haravgi. Archived from the original on 2014-06-06.
- Στεφανίδης, Γιώργος (2013-09-23). "Η ιστορία της Β' Κατηγορίας" (PDF). Haravgi (in Greek). p. 22. Archived from the original on 2016-03-25.
- "Cyprus – List of Second Level Champions". RSSSF.
- Gavreilides, Michalis; Papamoiseos, Stelios (2001). Ένας αιώνας Κυπριακό ποδόσφαιρο [One century Cypriot football] (in Greek). Nicosia: The writer. ISBN 9963-8720-1-8.
- Meletiou, Giorgos (2011). Κυπριακό ποδόσφαιρο 1900–1960 [Cypriot Football 1900–1960] (in Greek). Nicosia: Power Publishing. ISBN 978-9963-688-87-6.
