= 1968–69 Cypriot First Division =

Cypriot First Division
- Season: 1968–69

The 1968–69 Cypriot First Division was the 30th season of the Cypriot top-level football league.

== Overview ==
It was contested by 12 teams, and Olympiakos Nicosia won the championship. AEL Limassol participated in the Greek championship as the previous year's champions. They finished in the 18th position.

== League standings ==
Pos	Team	Pld	W	D	L	GF	GA	GD	Pts	Qualification or relegation
1	Olympiakos Nicosia (C)	22	12	6	4	51	18	+33	30	Qualification for European Cup first round
2	AC Omonia	22	12	6	4	41	18	+23	30	
3	Pezoporikos Larnaca	22	12	4	6	35	25	+10	28	
4	EPA Larnaca FC	22	8	8	6	39	41	−2	24	
5	Apollon Limassol	22	8	7	7	40	33	+7	23	
6	ASIL Lysi	22	10	3	9	24	29	−5	23	
7	Anorthosis Famagusta FC	22	7	8	7	28	27	+1	22	
8	APOEL F.C.	22	9	2	11	32	33	−1	20	Qualification for Cup Winners' Cup first round
9	Nea Salamis FC	22	6	7	9	30	41	−11	19	
10	Aris Limassol F.C.	22	5	9	8	24	37	−13	19	
11	Alki Larnaca FC	22	3	10	9	24	34	−10	16	
12	Evagoras Paphos (R)	22	2	6	14	19	51	−32	10	Relegation to Cypriot Second Division

(C) Champions; (R) Relegated

== Results ==
Home \ Away	ALK	ANR	APN	APL	ARS	ASL	EPA	EVA	NSL	OLY	OMO	POL
Alki		3–1	0–2	1–3	1–2	0–1	5–0	0–0	2–0	1–1	0–0	0–0
Anorthosis	0–0		2–0	0–0	2–0	1–0	4–4	4–1	2–0	1–1	1–1	1–2
APOEL	1–1	0–1		6–5	3–2	3–1	1–2	3–1	0–1	2–5	0–1	0–1
Apollon	4–1	1–1	0–2		0–0	3–0	3–3	1–0	1–1	0–0	1–0	5–3
Aris	1–1	1–2	1–1	2–1		0–2	1–1	1–1	1–1	0–4	1–1	3–3
ASIL	1–1	0–0	1–0	1–4	1–2		2–1	3–0	1–1	1–0	0–3	2–0
EPA	2–0	1–1	1–0	1–1	0–3	3–1		4–1	5–2	2–2	0–0	1–0
Evagoras	3–3	2–1	1–2	0–3	1–1	0–2	3–6		2–2	1–0	0–3	0–1
Nea Salamis	2–2	1–0	0–1	2–1	3–0	1–2	4–0	1–1		1–0	1–3	2–2
Olympiakos	6–1	3–2	3–2	3–1	2–0	4–0	3–0	6–0	5–0		1–1	1–0
Omonia	2–1	4–0	2–1	2–1	6–0	0–1	3–1	2–1	6–2	1–1		0–1
Pezoporikos	2–0	2–1	1–2	4–1	0–2	2–1	1–1	2–0	4–2	1–0	3–0	

Legend: Blue = home team win; Yellow = draw; Red = away team win.
