= 1967–68 Cypriot First Division =

Cypriot First Division
- Season: 1967–68

The 1967–68 Cypriot First Division was the 29th season of the Cypriot top-level football league.

== Overview ==
It was contested by 12 teams, and AEL Limassol won the championship. Olympiakos Nicosia participated in the Greek championship as the previous year's champions. They finished in the 17th position.

== League standings ==
Pos	Team	Pld	W	D	L	GF	GA	GD	Pts	Qualification or relegation
1	AEL Limassol (C)	22	17	3	2	65	20	+45	37	Qualification for European Cup first round
2	AC Omonia	22	15	3	4	50	28	+22	33	
3	Pezoporikos Larnaca	22	13	4	5	46	19	+27	30	
4	Apollon Limassol	22	12	5	5	48	26	+22	29	
5	Anorthosis Famagusta FC	22	9	5	8	48	35	+13	23	
6	Alki Larnaca FC	22	10	2	10	56	50	+6	22	
7	EPA Larnaca FC	22	7	6	9	43	36	+7	20	
8	Nea Salamis FC	22	8	4	10	47	49	−2	20	
9	APOEL F.C.	22	6	6	10	55	44	+11	18	Qualification for Cup Winners' Cup first round
10	ASIL Lysi	22	7	2	13	31	58	−27	16	
11	Aris Limassol F.C.	22	5	1	16	32	81	−49	11	
12	APOP Paphos (R)	22	2	1	19	15	90	−75	5	Relegation to Cypriot Second Division

(C) Champions; (R) Relegated

== Results ==
Home \ Away	AEL	ALK	ANR	APN	APL	APP	ARS	ASL	EPA	NSL	OMO	POL
AEL		4–0	4–0	3–2	0–3	4–0	2–0	5–0	1–1	5–0	2–1	2–0
Alki	1–2		2–1	6–2	0–1	4–0	4–1	4–1	3–3	4–3	2–3	1–3
Anorthosis	1–1	2–0		0–2	0–2	6–1	7–0	4–0	2–2	3–0	2–2	0–0
APOEL	3–4	5–2	1–1		2–6	11–1	2–2	6–0	1–2	1–1	1–1	1–1
Apollon	1–1	1–2	2–3	2–0		6–0	5–3	3–0	1–0	2–4	1–1	0–0
APOP	0–4	1–7	1–2	1–0	2–4		3–2	3–3	0–2	1–2	1–3	0–3
Aris	2–9	1–5	3–2	0–3	0–5	2–0		3–1	3–1	0–3	0–2	2–3
ASIL	0–2	4–2	3–1	2–2	1–0	4–0	3–2		3–0	1–6	3–1	0–2
EPA	2–6	2–2	0–3	2–1	0–0	6–0	11–0	4–0		0–0	0–1	4–2
Nea Salamis	0–1	1–2	5–6	4–3	1–1	6–0	1–4	4–2	3–1		1–3	1–1
Omonia	3–2	5–2	2–1	2–6	1–2	3–0	6–1	2–0	2–0	3–0		1–0
Pezoporikos	0–1	4–1	2–1	1–0	5–0	6–0	3–1	2–0	2–0	5–1	1–2	

Legend: Blue = home team win; Yellow = draw; Red = away team win.
