= 2010–11 Cypriot Second Division =

Cypriot Second Division
- Season: 2010–11
- Champions: Aris (4th title)
- Promoted: Aris; Nea Salamina; Anagennisi
- Relegated: ASIL; Digenis; Adonis

The 2010–11 Cypriot Second Division was the 56th season of the Cypriot second-level football league. Aris Limassol won their 4th title.

== Team Changes from 2009–10 ==
Teams promoted to 2010–11 Cypriot First Division

- Alki Larnaca
- AEK Larnaca
- Olympiakos Nicosia

Teams relegated from 2009–10 Cypriot First Division

- Aris Limassol
- Nea Salamina
- APEP

Teams promoted from 2009–10 Cypriot Third Division

- Champions: Chalkanoras Idaliou
- Runners-up: Adonis Idalion, Anagennisi Deryneia

Teams relegated to 2010–11 Cypriot Third Division

- Frenaros FC
- Ayia Napa
- MEAP Nisou

== League table ==
Pos	Team	Pld	W	D	L	GF	GA	GD	Pts	Qualification or relegation
1	Aris Limassol	26	15	5	6	41	20	+21	50	Qualification for promotion group
2	Nea Salamina	26	13	9	4	45	19	+26	48	Qualification for promotion group
3	Omonia Aradippou	26	14	5	7	37	27	+10	47	Qualification for promotion group
4	Anagennisi Deryneia	26	12	6	8	28	25	+3	42	Qualification for promotion group
5	Othellos Athienou	26	10	11	5	28	22	+6	41	
6	Atromitos Yeroskipou	26	12	4	10	35	26	+9	40	
7	PAEEK FC	26	10	6	10	36	36	0	36	
8	Akritas Chlorakas	26	9	7	10	34	38	−4	34	
9	APEP	26	8	9	9	33	34	−1	33	
10	Chalkanoras Idaliou	26	9	6	11	41	44	−3	33	
11	Onisilos Sotira	26	8	8	10	26	30	−4	32	
12	ASIL Lysi (R)	26	6	5	15	20	41	−21	23	Relegated to Cypriot Third Division
13	Digenis Morphou (R)	26	5	6	15	24	45	−21	21	Relegated to Cypriot Third Division
14	Adonis Idaliou (R)	26	4	7	15	24	45	−21	19	Relegated to Cypriot Third Division

Source: CFA
(R) Relegated

=== Promotion group ===
Pos	Team	Pld	W	D	L	GF	GA	GD	Pts	Promotion
1	Aris Limassol (C)	32	16	9	7	49	25	+24	57	Promoted to Cypriot First Division
2	Nea Salamina (P)	32	14	13	5	50	25	+25	55	Promoted to Cypriot First Division
3	Anagennisi Deryneia (P)	32	15	9	8	37	27	+10	54	Promoted to Cypriot First Division
4	Omonia Aradippou	32	15	6	11	42	41	+1	51	

Source: CFA
(C) Champions; (P) Promoted

=== Results ===
Home \ Away	AND	ARI	NSL	OMO
Anagennisi Deryneia		0–0	3–1	3–0
Aris Limassol	0–0		1–1	2–3
Nea Salamina	0–0	1–1		1–0
Omonia Aradippou	1–3	0–4	1–1	

Legend: Blue = home team win; Yellow = draw; Red = away team win.

=== Top scorers ===
Rank	Player	Club	Goals
1	(Poland) Łukasz Sosin	Aris Limassol	19
2	(Ghana) Chris Dickson	Nea Salamina	16
3	(Poland) Janusz Surdykowski	APEP	15
4	(Zimbabwe) Edward Mashinya	Omonia Aradippou	13
5	(Serbia) Milan Belić	Nea Salamina	10
5	(Latvia) Aleksejs Koļesņikovs	Othellos Athienou	10
5	(Cyprus) Sotiris Vourkou	PAEEK FC	10
5	(Cyprus) Marios Neophytou	Akritas Chlorakas	10
6	(Cyprus) Andreas Pittaras	Chalkanoras Idaliou	9
7	(Brazil) Ricardo Malzoni	Omonia Aradippou	8
7	(Portugal) Milton	Akritas Chlorakas	8
7	(Cyprus) Costas Elia	Anagennisi Dherynia	8
7	(Cyprus) Panayiotis Pontikos	Omonia Aradippou	8
8	(Democratic Republic of the Congo) Papi Kimoto	APEP	7
8	(Latvia) Viktors Morozs	Atromitos Yeroskipou	7
9	(Democratic Republic of the Congo) Egola Empela	Othellos Athienou	6
9	(Cyprus) Filippos Filippou	Chalkanoras Idaliou	6

Including matches after 26th matchday; Source:

== See also ==
- 2010–11 Cypriot First Division
- 2010–11 Cypriot Cup

== Sources ==
- "2010/11 Cypriot Second Division". Rec.Sport.Soccer Statistics Foundation. 2016-01-14.
