= Daniil Galyata =

Belarusian footballer

Personal information
- Full name: Daniil Vladimirovich Galyata
- Date of birth: 2 February 2007 (age 19)
- Place of birth: Belarus
- Height: 1.81 m (5 ft 11 in)
- Position: Midfielder

Team information
- Current team: Aris Limassol (on loan from ML Vitebsk)
- Number: 21

Youth career
- –2023: Energetik-BGU Minsk

Senior career*
Years	Team	Apps	(Gls)
2023–2024	Energetik-BGU Minsk	13	(1)
2023	Energetik-BGU Minsk II	4	(1)
2024–2025	Isloch	18	(0)
2025–	ML Vitebsk	35	(1)
2026–	→ Aris Limassol (loan)	4	(0)

International career^{‡}
2024	Belarus U17	6	(0)
2024–	Belarus U19	7	(0)
2026–	Belarus U21	1	(1)
2026–	Belarus	2	(0)
- * Club domestic league appearances and goals as of 27 September 2026 ‡ National team caps and goals as of 27 September 2026

Daniil Galyata ( born 2 February 2007) is a Belarusian professional footballer who plays as a midfielder for Cypriot First Division team Aris Limassol, on loan from Belarusian Premier League club ML Vitebsk, and the Belarus national football team.

== Club career ==
=== Energetik Minsk ===
Galyata began his career at Energetik-BGU Minsk. He made his debut for the club in July 2023, in a Belarusian Cup match against ML Vitebsk, coming on as a substitute in the 71st minute. He made 11 appearances for the first team that season at 16 years old, scoring 1 goal as the team was relegated to the Belarusian First League.

=== Isloch ===
Galyata signed for Isloch in 2024 on a two-year deal. He helped the club to the 2023–24 Belarusian Cup final, losing to Neman Grodno. He also played in that season's UEFA Conference League.

=== ML Vitebsk ===
Galyata signed for ML Vitebsk in 2025. He made his debut for the club in March 2025, in a match against Arsenal Dzerzhinsk, coming on as a substitute in the 73rd minute. He played 25 matches in the league as the club won their first league title in their first season in the Belarusian Premier League.

=== Aris Limassol ===
Galyata was signed by Cypriot First Division side Aris Limassol in 2026, on a loan with option to buy deal.

== International career ==
Galyata has represented Belarus at various youth levels, captaining the nation also.

In March 2026, he received his first call-up to the Belarus senior team. He made his debut during that window as a substitute against Cyprus.
