= 1964–65 Cypriot Second Division =

Cypriot Second Division
- Season: 1964–65
- Champions: Orfeas Nicosia (2nd title)

The 1964–65 Cypriot Second Division was the tenth season of the Cypriot second-level football league. Orfeas Nicosia won their 2nd title.

== Format ==
Eight teams participated in the 1964–65 Cypriot Second Division. The league was split to two geographical groups, depending from Districts of Cyprus each participated team came from. All teams of a group played against each other twice, once at their home and once away. The team with the most points at the end of the season crowned group champions. The winners of each group were playing against each other in the final phase of the competition and the winner were the champions of the Second Division.

== See also ==
- Cypriot Second Division
- 1964–65 Cypriot First Division
