= 1969–70 Cypriot First Division =

Cypriot First Division
- Season: 1969–70

The 1969–70 Cypriot First Division was the 31st season of the Cypriot top-level football league.

== Overview ==
It was contested by 12 teams, and EPA Larnaca FC won the championship. Olympiakos Nicosia participated in the Greek championship as the previous year's champions. They finished in 17th position.

== League standings ==
Pos	Team	Pld	W	D	L	GF	GA	GD	Pts	Qualification or relegation
1	EPA Larnaca FC (C)	22	12	7	3	46	18	+28	31	Qualification for European Cup first round
2	Pezoporikos Larnaca	22	13	5	4	28	12	+16	31	Qualification for Cup Winners' Cup first round
3	AC Omonia	22	12	7	3	31	16	+15	31	
4	APOEL F.C.	22	9	5	8	35	32	+3	23	
5	Anorthosis Famagusta FC (Note: 1 point deducted.)	22	8	7	7	27	25	+2	22	
6	Nea Salamis FC	22	6	9	7	26	24	+2	21	
7	AEL Limassol	22	5	9	8	24	25	−1	19	
8	Apollon Limassol	22	6	8	8	23	25	−2	19	
9	ASIL Lysi	22	5	9	8	14	24	−10	19	
10	EN Paralimni	22	7	4	11	20	32	−12	18	
11	Alki Larnaca FC	22	7	3	12	25	36	−11	17	
12	Aris Limassol F.C. (R)	22	1	9	12	10	40	−30	11	Relegation to Cypriot Second Division

(C) Champions; (R) Relegated

== Results ==
Home \ Away	AEL	ALK	ANR	APN	APL	ARS	ASL	ENP	EPA	NSL	OMO	POL
AEL		3–1	1–2	2–2	1–1	4–1	0–0	4–0	1–1	0–1	0–0	0–0
Alki	2–1		2–1	0–2	0–2	4–1	3–0	2–1	0–2	4–3	0–1	0–2
Anorthosis	0–1	0–0		2–1	2–1	4–0	3–1	3–0	1–2	0–0	0–1	1–0
APOEL	3–0	2–2	2–2		2–0	2–0	1–4	0–1	3–3	2–1	3–2	0–1
Apollon	1–2	2–1	6–3	0–0		0–0	0–1	3–0	0–3	1–1	0–0	2–0
Aris	0–0	0–0	0–0	1–4	1–1		0–0	1–1	0–2	0–0	0–3	0–1
ASIL	2–2	0–1	0–0	0–2	0–0	1–2		2–1	1–1	1–0	0–0	0–1
ENP	1–0	2–1	3–2	3–0	3–0	2–2	1–0		0–2	0–0	0–1	1–1
EPA	3–0	4–0	4–0	3–0	0–1	4–0	0–0	2–0		2–2	3–3	0–1
Nea Salamis	2–2	3–1	0–0	2–3	1–0	2–1	0–1	3–0	2–1		0–1	1–1
Omonia	1–0	3–1	0–0	1–0	2–2	4–0	0–0	1–0	2–3	2–1		0–1
Pezoporikos	1–0	1–0	0–1	2–1	2–0	1–0	6–0	2–0	1–1	1–1	2–3	

Legend: Blue = home team win; Yellow = draw; Red = away team win.
