= Hristian Foti =

Bulgarian footballer

Personal information
- Full name: Hristian Antonis Foti
- Date of birth: 16 October 2001 (age 25)
- Place of birth: Varna, Bulgaria
- Height: 1.71 m (5 ft 7 in)
- Position: Right back

Team information
- Current team: PAEEK
- Number: 16

Youth career
- 2010–2017: Cherno More
- 2017–2019: Omonia

Senior career*
Years	Team	Apps	(Gls)
2018–2019	Omonia	3	(0)
2019–2021	Alki Oroklini	45	(2)
2021–2022	Olympiakos Nicosia	0	(0)
2022–2023	Omonia 29M	21	(0)
2023–2025	Omonia Aradippou	28	(0)
2025–	PAEEK	25	(0)

International career
2017	Bulgaria U17	1	(0)
- * Club domestic league appearances and goals as of 3 May 2026

Hristian Antonis Foti (Bulgarian: Христиан Антонис Фоти; born 16 October 2001) is a Bulgarian footballer who played as a defender for PAEEK.

== Career ==
Born in Varna, Bulgaria, to a Greek Cypriot father and a Bulgarian mother, Foti joined Cherno More's youth academy at the age of nine in 2010. In July 2017 he joined the Omonia youth team, making his professional debut against AEK Larnaca on 29 April 2018.

On 5 July 2019, Foti signed with Alki Oroklini.

== International career ==
=== Youth levels ===
Foti was called up for the Bulgarian under-17 team by Viktorio Pavlov for 2017 European Under-17 Championship qualifying matches on 10 and 16 October 2017. He made his debut against Ukraine.

== Club statistics ==
As of match played 13 May 2018

Club	Season	League		Cup		Total	
Club	Season	Apps	Goals	Apps	Goals	Apps	Goals
Omonia
Omonia	2017–18	3	0	0	0	3	0
Career total		3	0	0	0	3	0
