= Fivos Vrahimis =

Cypriot footballer (born 1953)

Personal information
- Full name: Fivos Vrahimis
- Date of birth: 18 May 1953 (age 73)
- Place of birth: Koma tou Gialou, Cyprus
- Position: Midfielder

Senior career*
Years	Team	Apps	(Gls)
1972–1986	Anorthosis Famagusta	343	(122)
Total		343	(122)

International career
	Cyprus U21	1	(1)
1977–1982	Cyprus	18	(4)
- * Club domestic league appearances and goals

Fivos Vrahimis (Greek: Φοίβος Βραχίμης; born 18 May 1953) is a Cypriot former footballer who played as a midfielder and made 18 appearances for the Cyprus national team.

== Club career ==
Vrahimis spent his entire career at Anorthosis Famagusta, which began in 1972 and lasted until 1986, when he had to retire due to injury. His greatest success with the club was the Cypriot Cup victory in 1975.

== International career ==
Vrahimis made his debut for Cyprus on 30 January 1977 in a friendly match against Bulgaria, which finished as a 1–2 loss. He went on to make 18 appearances, scoring 4 goals, before making his last appearance on 13 November 1982 in a UEFA Euro 1984 qualifying match against Sweden, which finished as a 0–1 loss.

== Career statistics ==
=== International ===
Cyprus
Year	Apps	Goals
1977	2	0
1978	3	0
1979	3	1
1980	1	0
1981	5	1
1982	4	2
Total	18	4

=== International goals ===
No.	Date	Venue	Opponent	Score	Result	Competition
1	9 December 1979	Tsirio Stadium, Limassol, Cyprus	Spain	1–2	1–3	UEFA Euro 1980 qualifying
2	18 February 1981	Stade du Heysel, Brussels, Belgium	Belgium	2–2	2–3	1982 FIFA World Cup qualification
3	15 April 1982	Damascus, Syria	Syria	1–0	1–0	Friendly
4	1 May 1982	Stadionul Corvinul, Hunedoara, Romania	Romania	1–0	1–3	UEFA Euro 1984 qualifying

== Honours ==
Anorthosis Famagusta

- Cypriot Cup: 1974–75
