= 1961–62 Cypriot Second Division =

Cypriot Second Division
- Season: 1961–62
- Champions: Panellinios Limassol (1st title)

The 1961–62 Cypriot Second Division was the eighth season of the Cypriot second-level football league. Panellinios Limassol won their 1st title.

== Format ==
Ten teams participated in the 1961–62 Cypriot Second Division. The league was split to three geographical groups, depending from Districts of Cyprus each participated team came from. All teams of a group played against each other twice, once at their home and once away. The team with the most points at the end of the season crowned group champions. The winners of each group were playing against each other in the final phase of the competition and the winner were the champions of the Second Division.

== See also ==
- Cypriot Second Division
- 1961–62 Cypriot First Division
