= 1961–62 Cypriot First Division =

Cypriot First Division
- Season: 1961–62

The 1961–62 Cypriot First Division was the 24th season of the Cypriot top-level football league.

== Overview ==
It was contested by 13 teams, and Anorthosis Famagusta FC won the championship.

== League standings ==
Pos	Team	Pld	W	D	L	GF	GA	GD	Pts	Relegation
1	Anorthosis Famagusta FC (C)	24	16	3	5	49	26	+23	35	
2	AC Omonia	24	13	5	6	51	23	+28	31	
3	Pezoporikos Larnaca	24	13	4	7	58	38	+20	30	
4	AEL Limassol	24	11	6	7	53	36	+17	28	
5	Nea Salamis FC	24	11	6	7	48	36	+12	28	
6	Olympiakos Nicosia (Note: Olympiakos Nicosia had 1 point deducted.)	24	12	3	9	56	38	+18	26	
7	Orfeas Nicosia	24	9	6	9	43	46	−3	24	
8	Aris Limassol F.C.	24	9	6	9	39	46	−7	24	
9	APOEL F.C.	24	8	6	10	48	46	+2	22	
10	Apollon Limassol	24	9	4	11	41	49	−8	22	
11	EPA Larnaca FC	24	7	7	10	41	48	−7	21	
12	Alki Larnaca FC	24	8	3	13	37	45	−8	19	
13	AYMA (R)	24	0	1	23	15	102	−87	1	Relegation to Cypriot Second Division

(C) Champions; (R) Relegated

== Results ==
Home \ Away	AEL	ALK	ANR	APN	APL	ARS	AYM	EPA	NSL	OLY	OMO	ORF	POL
AEL		2–0	3–1	2–1	2–2	4–2	8–1	2–1	0–0	4–0	0–0	0–1	3–4
Alki	1–3		0–2	2–0	2–1	2–0	9–1	0–0	1–3	1–2	0–0	0–1	1–8
Anorthosis	1–0	2–1		3–1	3–0	3–0	4–0	3–1	3–1	2–0	1–0	2–1	2–1
APOEL	1–1	2–3	2–5		3–0	3–3	5–0	6–2	1–1	4–1	0–2	2–1	3–1
Apollon	3–2	4–1	3–2	1–3		3–3	4–0	6–4	2–1	2–4	0–3	1–1	3–0
Aris	1–2	2–1	0–0	1–0	1–0		5–0	2–2	1–0	3–2	2–1	4–1	1–2
AYMA	1–6	1–3	0–2	1–2	0–1	2–2		1–4	0–7	0–8	0–5	1–3	1–2
EPA	4–2	1–1	2–3	4–0	1–1	2–1	4–2		1–1	3–2	0–3	1–0	0–3
Nea Salamis	0–1	1–2	3–1	2–2	1–0	4–2	3–1	2–1		4–2	4–1	2–2	2–1
Olympiakos	2–2	2–1	2–1	1–1	5–0	5–0	2–1	2–0	6–1		1–2	2–0	1–1
Omonia	3–0	0–1	1–1	3–2	2–3	5–0	4–0	0–0	0–2	3–0		3–2	3–2
Orfeas	2–2	4–2	2–2	2–2	3–0	2–3	2–0	3–1	3–3	0–3	1–6		4–3
Pezoporikos	4–2	3–2	2–0	4–2	2–1	0–0	7–1	2–2	2–0	2–1	1–1	1–2	

Legend: Blue = home team win; Yellow = draw; Red = away team win.
