= 1965–66 Cypriot Second Division =

Cypriot Second Division
- Season: 1965–66
- Champions: APOP Paphos (1st title)
- Promoted: APOP Paphos

The 1965–66 Cypriot Second Division was the 11th season of the Cypriot second-level football league. APOP Paphos won their 1st title.

== Format ==
Eleven teams participated in the 1965–66 Cypriot Second Division. The league was split to two geographical groups, depending from Districts of Cyprus each participated team came from. All teams of a group played against each other twice, once at their home and once away. The team with the most points at the end of the season crowned group champions. The winners of each group were playing against each other in the final phase of the competition and the winner were the champions of the Second Division. The champions was promoted to 1966–67 Cypriot First Division.

== See also ==
- Cypriot Second Division
- 1965–66 Cypriot First Division
