= 1954–55 Cypriot First Division =

Cypriot First Division
- Season: 1954–55

The 1954–55 Cypriot First Division was the 18th season of the Cypriot top-level football league.

== Overview ==
It was contested by 10 teams, and AEL Limassol won the championship.

== League standings ==
Pos	Team	Pld	W	D	L	GF	GA	GD	Pts	Relegation
1	AEL Limassol (C)	18	13	3	2	40	19	+21	29	
2	Pezoporikos Larnaca	18	10	4	4	45	19	+26	24	
3	APOEL F.C.	18	8	7	3	37	25	+12	23	
4	Çetinkaya Türk S.K.	18	8	4	6	30	24	+6	20	
5	EPA Larnaca FC	18	7	4	7	38	33	+5	18	
6	AC Omonia	18	7	3	8	29	27	+2	17	
7	Anorthosis Famagusta FC	18	6	4	8	35	31	+4	16	
8	AYMA	18	5	6	7	35	44	−9	16	
9	Olympiakos Nicosia	18	5	1	12	24	55	−31	11	
10	Aris Limassol F.C. (R)	18	1	4	13	15	51	−36	6	Relegation to Cypriot Second Division

(C) Champions; (R) Relegated

== Results ==
Home \ Away	AEL	ANR	APN	ARS	AYM	EPA	OLY	OMO	POL	ÇET
AEL		2–2	4–1	1–0	4–2	4–2	2–1	5–1	0–1	1–0
Anorthosis	1–2		1–2	5–0	3–3	3–2	8–0	0–2	2–2	3–0
APOEL	1–1	3–1		4–0	1–1	2–0	5–0	0–0	1–7	2–0
Aris	1–3	0–1	1–1		1–1	2–2	0–1	2–4	3–2	1–1
AYMA	2–0	4–0	1–1	3–0		2–2	1–2	2–0	3–3	1–5
EPA	1–4	2–0	1–5	7–2	5–0		4–0	2–1	2–1	0–0
Olympiakos	0–2	0–8	7–4	3–0	2–5	0–1		2–6	0–1	1–4
Omonia	0–1	2–1	0–2	5–1	3–1	2–2	0–2		2–0	1–1
Pezoporikos	1–1	1–2	4–0	6–0	8–0	3–2	7–1	1–0		1–0
Çetinkaya	2–3	2–0	2–2	2–1	4–3	2–1	3–0	2–1	0–2	

Legend: Blue = home team win; Yellow = draw; Red = away team win.
