= Enosis Agion Omologiton =

Cypriot football club in Nicosia

E.N.A.O.
- Full name: Enosi Agion Omologiton
- Founded: 1944
- Ground: GSP Stadium, Nicosia, Cyprus
- Chairman: (Cyprus)
- Manager: (Cyprus)

Enosis Agion Omologiton was a Cypriot football club based in Ayioi Omoloyites a settlement of Nicosia. In 1960-61 the team won the Cypriot Second Division but they didn't participate in the Cypriot First Division.

Later the team was dissolved.

== Honours ==
- Cypriot Second Division :1960-61
