= 1970–71 Cypriot First Division =

Cypriot First Division
- Season: 1970–71

The 1970–71 Cypriot First Division was the 32nd season of the Cypriot top-level football league.

== Overview ==
It was contested by 12 teams, and Olympiakos Nicosia won the championship. EPA Larnaca FC participated in the Greek championship as the previous year's champions. They finished in 18th position.

== League standings ==
Pos	Team	Pld	W	D	L	GF	GA	GD	Pts	Qualification or relegation
1	Olympiakos Nicosia (C)	22	11	9	2	40	22	+18	31	Qualification for European Cup first round
2	Digenis Akritas Morphou	22	9	9	4	21	15	+6	27	Qualification for UEFA Cup first round
3	APOEL F.C.	22	8	10	4	30	19	+11	26	
4	AC Omonia	22	11	3	8	33	20	+13	25	
5	Pezoporikos Larnaca	22	9	7	6	26	17	+9	25	
6	Apollon Limassol	22	8	8	6	30	20	+10	24	
7	EN Paralimni	22	8	8	6	24	18	+6	24	
8	Anorthosis Famagusta FC	22	7	6	9	23	31	−8	20	Qualification for Cup Winners' Cup first round
9	Alki Larnaca FC	22	4	11	7	25	29	−4	19	
10	Nea Salamis FC	22	7	5	10	24	36	−12	19	
11	AEL Limassol	22	6	4	12	12	27	−15	16	
12	ASIL Lysi (R)	22	1	6	15	7	41	−34	8	Relegation to Cypriot Second Division

(C) Champions; (R) Relegated

== Results ==
Home \ Away	AEL	ALK	ANR	APN	APL	ASL	DIG	ENP	NSL	OLY	OMO	POL
AEL		0–0	1–2	0–1	1–0	1–0	0–1	0–1	1–0	0–6	0–1	0–1
Alki	0–0		2–2	1–1	0–0	3–1	2–1	1–1	3–1	1–1	1–2	0–0
Anorthosis	1–0	2–1		1–1	0–1	0–0	1–1	1–2	1–1	1–1	0–1	2–1
APOEL	3–0	1–2	4–1		2–2	2–0	0–0	0–0	2–0	1–1	0–0	0–0
Apollon	1–2	2–0	3–0	2–2		6–0	2–1	1–1	4–0	0–0	1–0	0–2
ASIL	0–0	1–1	0–3	0–3	1–1		0–0	0–2	0–1	1–0	0–3	0–1
Digenis	1–0	1–0	0–2	1–0	1–0	3–1		2–0	2–2	1–2	2–1	0–0
ENP	3–0	3–1	0–1	1–1	0–2	3–1	0–0		2–1	1–1	0–0	1–2
Nea Salamis	3–2	2–1	3–1	2–0	1–1	1–0	0–0	1–0		1–2	0–2	2–4
Olympiakos	1–1	5–3	2–0	2–0	2–1	1–1	1–1	1–1	5–0		3–2	2–0
Omonia	0–1	2–2	3–0	2–4	4–0	1–0	0–1	0–2	2–1	5–0		1–2
Pezoporikos	1–2	0–0	3–1	1–2	0–0	5–0	1–1	1–0	1–1	0–1	0–1	

Legend: Blue = home team win; Yellow = draw; Red = away team win.
