= 1953–54 Cypriot First Division =

Cypriot First Division
- Season: 1953–54

The 1953–54 Cypriot First Division was the 17th season of the Cypriot top-level football league.

== Overview ==
It was contested by nine teams with Pezoporikos Larnaca winning the championship.

== League standings ==
Pos	Team	Pld	W	D	L	GF	GA	GD	Pts
1	Pezoporikos Larnaca (C)	16	11	4	1	40	16	+24	26
2	APOEL	16	10	2	4	22	18	+4	22
3	Anorthosis	16	7	4	5	32	31	+1	18
4	Çetinkaya Türk S.K.	16	7	3	6	28	26	+2	17
5	AEL Limassol	16	7	2	7	39	29	+10	16
6	EPA Larnaca FC	16	8	0	8	31	27	+4	16
7	AC Omonia	16	5	2	9	21	33	−12	12
8	Olympiakos Nicosia	16	4	1	11	17	34	−17	9
9	AYMA	16	4	0	12	30	46	−16	8

(C) Champions

== Results ==
Home \ Away	AEL	ANR	APN	AYM	EPA	OLY	OMO	POL	ÇET
AEL		3–3	1–2	4–3	2–1	5–0	7–1	0–1	3–3
Anorthosis	3–2		1–2	5–3	2–0	1–1	1–1	2–2	4–2
APOEL	2–1	0–1		5–3	2–1	1–0	1–0	1–1	1–0
AYMA	3–2	1–2	1–2		2–3	6–0	4–2	0–3	1–3
EPA	2–3	0–3	2–0	4–0		3–2	5–1	0–4	3–0
Olympiakos	1–0	5–1	1–2	2–1	0–2		2–1	1–2	0–3
Omonia	0–2	3–0	0–0	4–1	1–4	2–1		1–0	1–0
Pezoporikos	3–1	4–3	3–0	5–0	2–0	3–1	2–1		1–1
Çetinkaya	1–3	2–0	2–1	0–1	3–1	1–0	3–2	4–4	

Legend: Blue = home team win; Yellow = draw; Red = away team win.
