= Gaydzak Nicosia =

- Founded: 1957
- Dissolved: 1963
- Ground: GSP Stadium (1902)
- Capacity: 12000
- League: Cypriot Second Division

Gaydzak Nicosia was a Cypriot football club based in Nicosia. Founded in 1957, was playing sometimes in Second Division.

The club participated in

- 1961: 1st Qualifier
- 1961–1962: Cypriot Cup
- Winner: Anorthosis Famagusta FC
- 1961–1962: 1961–62 Cypriot Second Division (Nicosia-Kyrenia Group)
- Winner: Keravnos Strovolou FC
- 1962–1963: Cypriot Cup
- Winner: APOEL F.C.
- 1962–63: Cypriot Second Division (Nicosia-Kyrenia-Famagusta-Larnaca Group)
- Winner: Keravnos Strovolou FC
