= Apollon Athienou =

- Founded: 1958
- Dissolved: 1972

Apollon Athienou was a Cypriot football club based in Athienou. The team was playing sometimes in Second and in Third Division. In 1972 merged with Othellos Athienou F.C. keeping the name Othellos.
