= 1962–63 Cypriot Second Division =

Cypriot association football league season

Cypriot Second Division
- Season: 1962–63
- Champions: Panellinios Limassol (2nd title)

The 1962–63 Cypriot Second Division was the ninth season of the Cypriot Second Division football league. Panellinios Limassol won their 2nd title.

== Format ==
Nine teams participated in the 1962–63 Cypriot First Division. The league was split into two geographical groups, depending from Districts of Cyprus each participated team came from. All teams of a group played against each other twice, once at their home and once away. The team with the most points at the end of the season were crowned group champions. The winners of each group were playing against each other in the final phase of the competition and the winner were the champions of the Second Division.
