= 1955–56 Cypriot First Division =

Cypriot First Division
- Season: 1955–56

The 1955–56 Cypriot First Division was the 19th season of the Cypriot top-level football league.

== Overview ==
It was contested by 9 teams, and AEL Limassol won the championship.

== League standings ==
Pos	Team	Pld	W	D	L	GF	GA	GD	Pts	Relegation
1	AEL Limassol (C)	16	9	5	2	38	17	+21	23	
2	APOEL F.C.	16	9	3	4	30	16	+14	21	
3	Nea Salamis FC	16	7	5	4	31	24	+7	19	
4	Olympiakos Nicosia	16	7	5	4	29	27	+2	19	
5	Anorthosis Famagusta FC	16	8	2	6	43	33	+10	18	
6	AC Omonia	16	7	2	7	23	26	−3	16	
7	Pezoporikos Larnaca	16	5	4	7	25	31	−6	14	
8	EPA Larnaca FC	16	4	2	10	23	38	−15	10	
9	AYMA (R)	16	1	2	13	21	51	−30	4	Relegation to Cypriot Second Division

(C) Champions; (R) Relegated

== Results ==
Home \ Away	AEL	ANR	APN	AYM	EPA	NSL	OLY	OMO	POL
AEL		7–0	2–0	1–0	2–1	3–1	1–1	0–0	4–0
Anorthosis	4–5		1–0	3–1	6–1	0–0	2–3	4–1	5–2
APOEL	2–2	2–0		4–1	3–1	1–0	1–2	0–0	2–2
AYMA	0–3	3–4	0–4		3–5	2–5	3–1	1–4	2–3
EPA	2–2	0–5	1–4	4–0		2–1	3–2	0–1	0–2
Nea Salamis	1–1	3–2	2–0	3–3	2–1		1–2	2–0	0–0
Olympiakos	1–1	4–2	2–3	0–0	3–1	2–2		2–1	3–0
Omonia	0–1	1–1	2–1	3–2	1–0	1–3	5–0		1–3
Pezoporikos	2–0	0–4	0–1	4–0	1–1	4–5	1–1	1–2	

Legend: Blue = home team win; Yellow = draw; Red = away team win.
