= Enosis Panelliniou-Antaeus Limassol =

EPAL
- Full name: Enosis Panelliniou-Antaeus Limassol
- Founded: 1963
- Dissolved: 26 May 1971
- Ground: GSO Stadium

EPAL (Enosis Panelliniou-Antaeus Limassol) was a Cypriot football club based in Limassol. The club was formed in 1963 after the merger of the two clubs of Limassol, Panellinios Limassol and Antaeus Limassol. EPAL was playing 7 seasons in Second Division. At 1971 the club absorbed from Aris Limassol F.C.
