= GSO Stadium =

Former stadium in Limassol, Cyprus

Coordinates: 34°40′52″N 33°03′13″E

- Interactive map of GSO Stadium
- Full name: Gymnastikos Syllogos Olympia Stadium
- Location: Limassol, Cyprus
- Owner: GSO
- Operator: GSO

Construction
- Built: 1898
- Opened: 1899
- Expanded: 1910, 1954
- Closed: 1975
- Demolished: 1975

Tenants
- AEL (1930–1975); Aris (1930–1975); Apollon Limassol (1954–1975); EPAL (1963–1971); Antaeus (1953–1957); Panellinios (1953–1963); Arion (1965–1970); EPAL (1963–1971); Amathus (1957–1965); ENAZ (1970–1973)

GSO Stadium or Gymnastic Club Olympia Stadium (Greek: Γυμναστικός Σύλλογος Ολύμπια; Γ.Σ.Ο.) was a stadium in Limassol, Cyprus.

== History ==
In July 1892, a group of locals founded the gymnastics club "Olympia" (GSO), which is the oldest gymnastics club in Cyprus and the second oldest in the Greek speaking world, after Panellinios G.S. which was founded in 1891. The stadium was constructed in 1898 and opened in 1899 with the event of the 3rd Pancyprian Athletics Games. The gym then had a perimeter track about 300 meters and a capacity of 700 spectators. In 1902 horse racing competitions were held in the stadium, and in 1904 the first flower festival was organized. In 1908 the stadium held the first tennis matches. In 1910 a new 1000 spectators stand was built.

In 1925 the association organized the first Pan-Hellenic Athletics Games, and in 1929 the first island-wide school competition. In 1931 the Metropolitan of Kition Nicodemus Mylonas initiated the national uprising, known as Oktovriana. In 1954, after a donation by the N. Lanitis family, a new entrance was erected, while additional wooden benches for 2000 spectators were added.

The stadium served as home ground to AEL, and Aris. In 1975 these teams relocated to the then newly built Tsirion Stadium. Since 2008 the area serves as a sports park.
