= Arion Lemesou =

- Dissolved: 1970
- Ground: GSO Stadium

Arion Lemesou was a Cypriot football club based in Limassol. Founded in 1956. The team was playing 5 seasons in Second Division. In September 1970 merged with Apollon Limassol keeping the name Apollon.
