= GSZ Stadium (1928) =

Stadium in Larnaca, Cyprus

Old GSZ Stadium
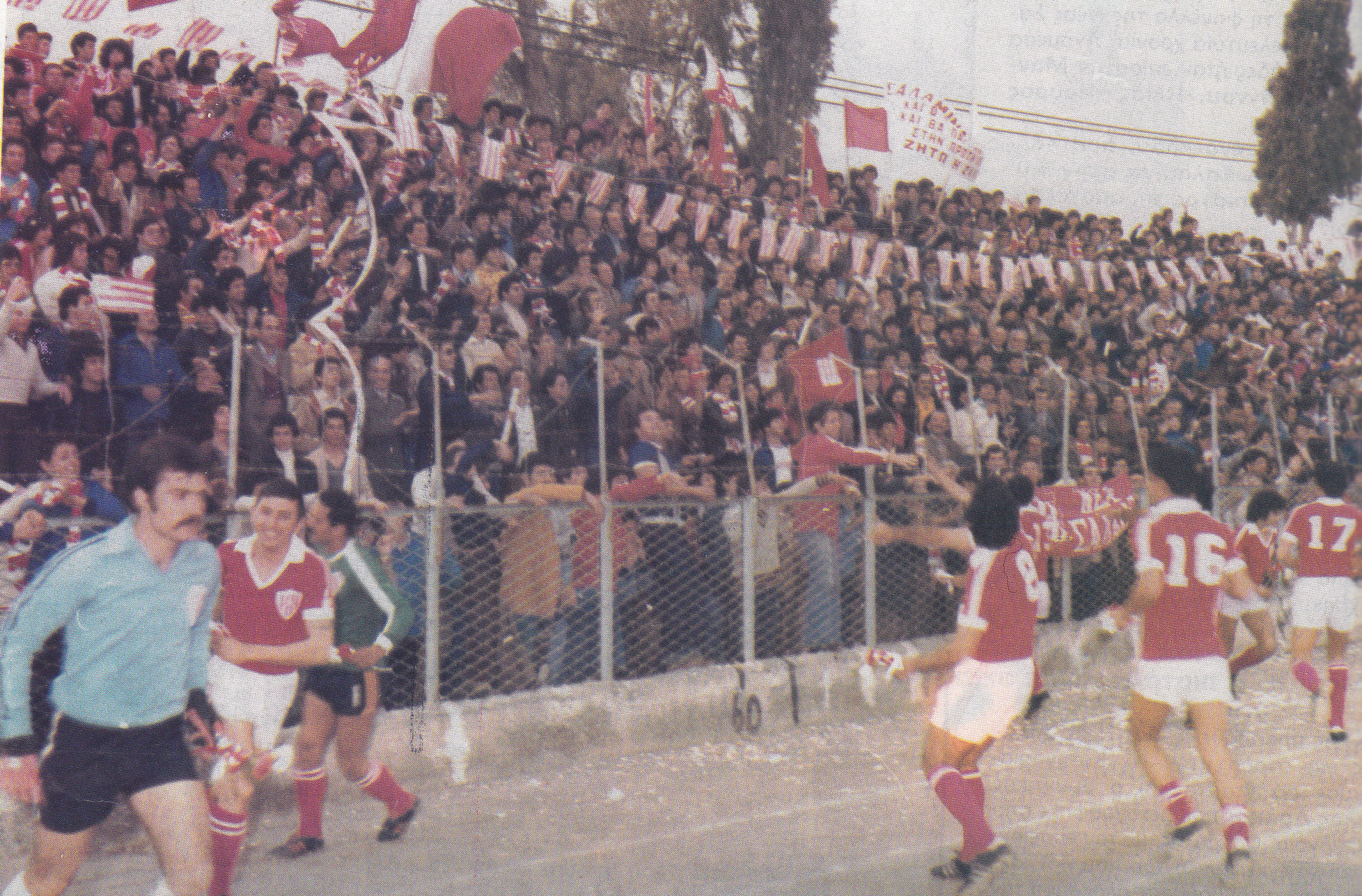
- Interactive map of Old GSZ Stadium
- Full name: Gymnastikos Syllogos Zenon Stadium
- Location: Larnaca, Cyprus
- Capacity: 10,000

Construction
- Built: 1928
- Opened: 1928
- Closed: 1989
- Demolished: 1989

Tenants
- AMOL (1928–1932); EPA Larnaca (1932–1989); Pezoporikos Larnaca (1928–1932, 1937–1989); Alki Larnaca (1954–1989); Anorthosis Famagusta (1974–1986); Nea Salamis Famagusta (1974–1989); Demi Spor Larnaca (1934–1955); Anagennisi Larnaca (1944–1970)

GSZ Stadium or Gymnastic Club Zenon Stadium (Greek: Γυμναστικός Σύλλογος Ζήνων; Γ.Σ.Ζ.) was a stadium in Larnaca, Cyprus. It was constructed in 1928 thanks to the donation of Demetrios N. Demetriou. From then until 1989, the stadium served as the home ground of EPA, Pezoporikos and Alki. In 1989 it was demolished and replaced by the new GSZ Stadium. Since 2003 the area serves as a sports park.
