= ASIL Lysi =

Cypriot football club

ASIL LysiΑ ΣΙΛ Λύσης
- Full name: Athletic Club Ischis Lysi; Αθλητικός Σύλλογος Ισχύς Λύσης
- Founded: 1932; 94 years ago
- Ground: Grigoris Auxentiou Stadium
- Capacity: 2,000
- Chairman: Giorgos Kkailis
- Manager: Angelos Efthymiou
- League: Second Division
- 2025–26: Second Division, 7th of 16
- Website: asillysis.com
Home colours	Away colours

ASIL Lysi (Greek: ΑΣΙΛ Λύσης) is a Cypriot football club which was established in the town of Lysi, Famagusta. After the Turkish invasion of Cyprus in 1974, ASIL became a refugee team and is temporarily based in Larnaca. The club plays in the Second Division.

== History ==
The club was founded in Lysi, Famagusta on June 26, 1932. Club founders were Ch. Fokaides, Ch. Panayides, K. Rousi and N. Petrou. The choice for the club's name is attributed to Demetris Lambrou.

The club had its own stadium in Lysi. The stadium was called «Grigoris Afxentiou Stadium» as a memory of EOKA hero Grigoris Afxentiou who was born in Lysi and he was a player of ASIL. ASIL stadium was one of the first stadiums in Cyprus with grass. After the 1974 Turkish invasion, ASIL used Tsirion Stadium in Limassol as its ground and since 1978 the club is based in Larnaca. Since 1984 ASIL has a new stadium in Larnaca called «Grigoris Afxentiou Stadium». In 2019–20 season ASIL used AEK Arena as its ground and since 2020–21 season ASIL uses GSZ Stadium.

The best season for the club was 1968–69 in which they finished 6th in the first division.

== Colours and badge ==
The club colours are yellow and black. The emblem of the club is the discus thrower to symbolise the club's commitment to the olympic ideals and true sportsmanship.

== Players ==
As of 16 September 2026

Note: Flags indicate national team as defined under FIFA eligibility rules; some limited exceptions apply. Players may hold more than one non-FIFA nationality.

No.	Pos.	Nation	Player
1	GK	CYP	Kyprianos Andreou
3	DF	CYP	Chrysostomos Filippou
7	MF	GRE	Lampros Zacharos
9	FW	CYP	Apollonas Vasiliou
10	FW	GRE	Marios Ogboe
12	DF	CYP	Kyriakos Kyriakou
13	GK	CYP	Evangelos Mousikos
14	FW	ESP	Mario da Costa
15	DF	CYP	Alexandros Prokopiou (on loan from APOEL)
16	DF	CYP	Hristian Foti
20	FW	CYP	Charalampos Kattirtzis (on loan from APOEL)
23	MF	CYP	Nikolas Mina
26	MF	CYP	Dimitris Charalampous

No.	Pos.	Nation	Player
28	FW	ANG	Jérémie Bela
29	GK	CYP	Konstantinos Petrou
32	FW	GRE	Alexandros Nikolias
33	DF	CYP	Kostas Charalambous
44	DF	CYP	Andreas Daniel
45	DF	CYP	Andreas Kyriakou
75	MF	CYP	Kyriakos Papastavrou
80	FW	CYP	Leonidas Ruchwani
98	DF	BRA	Jean Prudente
—	FW	CYP	Filippos Eftichidis
—	FW	CYP	Georgios Leon Diakos
—	DF	CYP	Andreas Kapsis
—	MF	CYP	Marinos Petrou (on loan from Anorthosis)

=== Technical staff ===
Position	Staff
Head coach	(Cyprus) Angelos Efthymiou
Assistant coach	vacant
Goalkeeper coach	(Brazil) (Cyprus) Alexandre Negri
Fitness coach	(Cyprus) Nikos Theophanous

== League history ==
The following table shows the progress of the team in time (for those seasons found data).

Season	Division	Place
2008–09	B	10th
2009–10	B	9th
2010–11	B	12th
2011–12	C	4th
2012–13	C	4th
2013–14	B2	6th
2014–15	C	2nd
2015–16	B	11th

== Honours ==
- Cypriot Second Division
  - Champions (2): 1967, 1974
- Cypriot Third Division
  - Champions (1): 2001
