= ENAD Ayiou Dometiou FC =

Cypriot football club

- Founded: 1937

ENAD Ayiou Dometiou FC is a Cypriot football club based in Ayios Dhometios, Nicosia. Founded in 1957, it played in the second, third and fourth divisions. The team dissolved after 1993 and reactive at 2013. The team is part of the sports club ENAD Ayiou Dometiou.
