= Evagoras Paphos =

- Full name: Athlitikos Syllogos Evagoras Paphos
- Nickname: EYG
- Founded: 1961; 65 years ago
- Dissolved: 2000; 26 years ago
- Ground: Pafiako Stadium
Home colours	Away colours

Athlitikos Syllogos Evagoras Paphos (Greek: Αθλητικός Σύλλογος Ευαγόρας Πάφου) was a Cypriot football club based in the city of Paphos. Founded in 1961, they played in both the First and Second Divisions. They adopted their name from Evagoras Pallikarides, a poet from Paphos who was hanged by the British authorities, as he was an EOKA guerrilla, fighting for the independence of Cyprus. He was the youngest insurgent to be executed in Cyprus. The club's badge was a green shield with the figure of Evagoras Pallikarides's face in a circle.

In contrast with the other Districts of Cyprus and other major towns, which had permanent teams in the First Division, Paphos did not have such a team as the two clubs of the town, Evagoras and APOP Paphos FC, could not remain in the First Division for many years. In 2000, the two clubs were merged to form AEP Paphos FC.

== Honours ==
- Cypriot Second Division
  - Champions (6): 1968, 1972, 1981, 1989, 1991, 1995
