= GSE Stadium =

Football stadium in Famagusta, Cyprus

Coordinates: 35°7′7″N 33°57′11″E

- Interactive map of GSE Stadium
- Location: Famagusta, Cyprus
- Owner: Evagoras Gymnastic Association

Tenants
- Anorthosis (1911–1974); Nea Salamina (1953–1974)

The Evagoras Gymnastic Association Stadium (GSE Stadium) (Gymnastikos Syllogos Evagoras, Greek: Γυμναστικός Σύλλογος Ευαγόρας) is a football stadium located in Famagusta, Cyprus and was the home ground of Anorthosis and Nea Salamina. The stadium remains abandoned and in bad condition since 1974 when Turkey invaded the island of Cyprus and occupied 37.6% of it including the city of Famagusta.

After the summer of 1974, Anorthosis used many football stadiums all around Cyprus like Dasaki Stadium, Aradippou Municipal Stadium, Paralimni Stadium, Tsirion Stadium, old GSZ Stadium, and new GSZ Stadium. In 1986, Anorthosis built its own stadium named Antonis Papadopoulos Stadium, located in Larnaca.

Similarly, Nea Salamis Famagusta FC had used the GSZ Stadium, Dasaki Stadium, Tsirion Stadium, Deryneia, and Antonis Papadopoulos. In 1991 the club managed to build its own home stadium Ammochostos Stadium, with a 5000 seating capacity, located also in Larnaca.
