= AEK Ammochostos =

- Founded: 1959
- Dissolved: 1980
- Ground: GSE Stadium

AEK Ammochostos was a Cypriot football club based in Famagusta. Founded in 1956, was playing sometimes in Second and in Third Division.

After the Turkish invasion of Cyprus and occupation of the city of Famagusta in 1974, the team was displaced to the southern part of the island, in Larnaca. The team dissolved in 1980 due to financial problems.
