= Antaeus Limassol =

- Founded: 1943; 83 years ago, as AMOL
- Dissolved: 1963; 63 years ago
- Ground: GSO Stadium

Antaeus Limassol was a Cypriot football club based in Limassol. The club was founded at 1943 as AMOL and change its name at 1951 to Antaeus. Between 1948 and 1953 was a member of Cyprus Amateur Football Federation. In 1953 joined Cyprus Football Association. Antaeus played to Second Division from 1953 to 1957. Then the club dissolved football team. At 1963 the club was merged with Panellinios Limassol to form EPAL.

== Titles ==
- CAFF Championship
  - Winners (1): 1952–53
