= Anagennisi Larnacas =

- Founded: 1944

Anagennisi Larnacas was a Cypriot football club based in Ayios Ioannis of Larnaca. Founded in 1944, it played in the 1965 / 1966 Cypriot Second Division under the Nicosia-Larnaca-Famagusta Group.
