= Orfeas Nicosia =

Cypriot football club

AC Orfeas Nicosia
- Founded: May 15, 1948; 78 years ago
- Ground: Orfeas Stadium
- Capacity: 2,500
- League: STOK Elite Division
- 2025–26: STOK Elite Division, 6th of 16
- Website: www.orfeasnicosia.com
Home colours	Away colours

Orfeas Nicosia (Greek: Ορφέας Λευκωσίας) is a Cypriot football club based in Nicosia. It was founded in 1948. The club colors are yellow and green. It has participated in the Cypriot First Division four times, from 1959 until 1963. The club's highest achievement is finishing 7th in the 1961–62 season.

The club's home ground is unique in being situated adjacent to the medieval Venetian walls of Nicosia, now part of the United Nations Buffer Zone in Cyprus, which has divided the Greek and Turkish parts of the island since the Turkish invasion of 1974.

== Achievements ==
- Cypriot Second Division Winners: 2

1958, 1965

- Cypriot Third Division Winners: 1

1979

- Cypriot Fourth Division Winners: 1

2003

- Cypriot Fourth Division 3rd Place: 1

2008
