= Panellinios Limassol =

Panellinios
- Full name: Panellinios Limassol

Panellinios Limassol was a Cypriot football team who played in the Cypriot Second Division.

In 1961–62 and 1962–63 the team won the Cypriot Second Division but the club lost the promotion-relegation playoff and so did not win promotion to the Cypriot First Division.

== Achievements ==
- Cypriot Second Division: 1961–62, 1962–63
