= Aris Limassol FC =

Cypriot football club

Aris Limassol
- Full name: Άρης Λεμεσού; Aris Limassol Football Club
- Nickname: Ελαφρά Ταξιαρχία (The Light Brigade)
- Founded: 3 October 1930; 95 years ago
- Ground: Alphamega Stadium
- Capacity: 11,000
- Chairman: Vladimir Fedorov
- Manager: Artsyom Radzkow
- League: First Division
- 2025–26: First Division, 6th of 14
- Website: arisfc.com
Home colours	Away colours

Aris Limassol (Greek: Άρης Λεμεσού) is a professional Cypriot football club based in Limassol and one of the founder members of Cyprus Football Association. The club's colours are green, black and white, and their home is the Alphamega Stadium. Founded in 1930, Aris Limassol is one of the most historic football clubs of Limassol.

The club also maintains teams in other sports including basketball, table tennis, darts, bowling and chess. The Aris chess team dominated Cypriot chess in the 1980s.

== History ==
One of the founder members of the Cyprus Football Association, Aris competed in the first five seasons of the Cypriot First Division, with their league placement ranging from 5th to 7th. The club ceased operation in 1939 due to financial difficulties, and returned in 1952, competing in the Second Division. Aris returned to the First Division in 1954, but finished last and was relegated. The following season they won the Second Division and returned to the top-tier league, only to be relegated again. Aris returned to the First Division once in 1958, placing 4th.

Being one of the weaker teams in the First Division during the 1960s, they were finally relegated in the 1969–70 season, placing 12th, and spent two years in the Second Division. The situation improved for Aris, with the team finishing 4th in the First Division, in the 1976–77 and 1978–79 seasons. In 1981, they were relegated again after finishing last but returned as runner-ups the following season. In 1989, the team qualified to the final of the Cypriot Cup, where they lost to AEL Limassol. The following season, Aris signed Oleg Blokhin, the 1975 European Footballer of the Year.

Following relegation in 1993, Aris won the Second Division for the third time in the club's history. From 1997 until 2006, the team would alternate between the First and Second Division. This situation ended in the 2006–07 season, when the team managed to remain in the First Division, placing 8th. However, the following season Aris was relegated once more, and the trend returned. After 9 years of drought, Aris managed to remain in the First Division in the 2015–16 season, finishing in 10th place. This season, Aris was the only team which played more than 6 Cypriot players in every match. After three seasons in the First Division, Aris was relegated and spent another three seasons in the Second Division, before being promoted once more in the 2020–21 season.

In Summer 2021, a new era began for Aris, with the belarusian investor Vladimir Fedorov, who intends to transform Aris into one of the elite clubs of Cyprus. The following season, Aris finished fourth in the league, meaning the club had qualified for the 2022–23 UEFA Europa Conference League, the first time the club had ever qualified for European football. They made their European debut in the second qualifying round against Neftçi Baku, and despite a 2–0 win at home, Aris lost 3–0 in the second tie, and was eliminated.

Aris' greatest success to date came in the 2022–23 season, as the team won the Cypriot First Division for the first time in their history, earning a place in the 2023–24 Champions League qualifying rounds. Four of the club's players made the Team of the Season at the PASP awards, including goalkeeper Vana Alves, and the team's top goalscorer Aleksandr Kokorin, who was also voted as the most valuable player of the season. Aris' head coach Aleksey Shpilevsky was voted as the best coach of the season. In the 2023–24 season, Aris became the seventh Cypriot club to qualify for the group stage of a European competition as they finished fourth in Group C of the Europa League.

== Supporters ==
Aris has a smaller number of fans compared to other Limassol clubs.

=== Choir ===
The Aris choir was established in 1938 by the conductor and composer Solon Michaelides who remained its conductor until 1956. In 1962, the choir returned the direction of Marinos Mitellas and remains one of the best-known Hellenic choirs performing in Cyprus, Greece and internationally.

== Players ==
As of 9 September 2026

Note: Flags indicate national team as defined under FIFA eligibility rules; some limited exceptions apply. Players may hold more than one non-FIFA nationality.

No.	Pos.	Nation	Player
1	GK	BRA	Vaná
3	DF	MNE	Lazar Maraš
5	DF	GER	David Lelle
6	MF	GHA	Alex Opoku Sarfo
7	DF	CYP	Anderson Correia
8	MF	CYP	Charalampos Charalampous
11	FW	GAB	Rody Junior Effaghe
16	FW	NGR	Oriyomi Lebi
17	DF	POL	Miłosz Matysik
18	DF	HUN	Bence Szakos
19	DF	SEN	Mamadou Sané
20	DF	BFA	Steeve Yago
21	MF	BLR	Daniil Galyata (on loan from ML Vitebsk)

No.	Pos.	Nation	Player
22	MF	SRB	Veljko Nikolić
24	DF	COD	Gédéon Kalulu
25	GK	ENG	Wes Foderingham
27	DF	CRO	Juraj Badelj
29	FW	NOR	Dennis Gaustad
30	FW	BRA	Gustavo Pajé
70	FW	NED	Chahid el Allachi
75	FW	CYP	Michalis Theodosiou
88	MF	CMR	Collins Fi Akamba
91	GK	CRO	Mislav Zadro
99	FW	BRA	Werton (on loan from Leixões)
—	FW	BLR	Denis Ovsyannikov

=== Out on loan ===
Note: Flags indicate national team as defined under FIFA eligibility rules; some limited exceptions apply. Players may hold more than one non-FIFA nationality.

No.	Pos.	Nation	Player
—	GK	CYP	Anastasios Pisiias (at APEA Akrotiri until 31 May 2027)
—	DF	BRA	Julio César (at Karmiotissa until 31 May 2027)
—	DF	RUS	Aleksandr Martynov (at Karmiotissa until 31 May 2027)

No.	Pos.	Nation	Player
—	DF	SEN	Aboubacar Loucoubar (at Karmiotissa until 31 May 2027)
—	MF	CYP	Marios Theocharous (at Karmiotissa until 31 May 2027)
—	FW	NED	Jaël Pawirodihardjo (at Karmiotissa until 31 May 2027)

=== Technical and medical staff ===
Position	Staff
Sporting Director	(Poland) Daniel Sikorski
Head coach	(Belarus) Artsyom Radzkow
Assistant Coaches	(Belarus) Andrey Harbunow
Assistant Coaches	(Spain) Pablo Arberola
Fitness coaches	(Poland) Sebastian Łokaj
Fitness coaches	(Poland) Dawid Goliński
Video Analysts	(Cyprus) Giorgos Christodoulou
Video Analysts	(Poland) Paweł Ernest
Goalkeeper coach	(Cyprus) Takis Taki
Team Manager	(Greece) Kostas Tsironis
Assistant Team manager	(Cyprus) Lefteris Petrides
Physiotherapists	(Cyprus) Constantinos Soutzis
Physiotherapists	(Cyprus) Alexis Marcou
Physiotherapists	(Cyprus) Giannis Georgiou
Physiotherapists	(Cyprus) Andreas Sylvestros
Physiotherapists	(Cyprus) Giorgos Hadjitoouli
Nutritionist	(Cyprus) Evagoras Christofides

== Managerial history ==
- (Czechoslovakia) Tadeáš Kraus (1976–1980), (1983–1985)
- (Cyprus) Andreas Michaelides (1986–1991)
- (Poland) Jerzy Engel (1997)
- (Cyprus) Milenko Špoljarić (2004–05)
- (Cyprus) Andreas Michaelides (2006–07)
- (Netherlands) Henk Houwaart (1 Sep 2007 – 30 Nov 2007)
- (Romania) Mihai Stoichiţă (2007–08)
- (Cyprus) Akis Agiomamitis (2008–09)
- (Cyprus) Marios Constantinou (17 May 2009 – 18 Jan 2010)
- (Belgium) Stéphane Demol (21 Feb 2010 – 30 June 2010)
- (Serbia) Dušan Mitošević (18 July 2011 – 30 June 2012)
- (Cyprus) Demetris Ioannou (1 July 2012 – 22 June 2013)
- (Cyprus) Tasos Kyriacou (1 July 2012 – 22 Oct 2013)
- (Netherlands) Ton Caanen (23 Oct 2013 – 11 May 2014)
- (Cyprus) Giorgos Polyviou (16 Jun 2014 – 14 Oct 2014)
- (Cyprus) Akis Agiomamitis (14 Oct 2014 – 14 Sep 2015)
- (Romania) Eugen Neagoe (15 Sep 2015 – 7 Feb 2016)
- (Cyprus) Kostas Kaiafas (8 Feb 2016 – 15 May 2016)
- (Greece) Thalis Theodoridis (24 Jun 2016 – 24 Oct 2016)
- (Belgium) Frederik Vanderbiest (1 Nov 2016 – 3 Jan 2017)
- (Cyprus) Nicolas Martides (Jan 2017 – 3 October 2017)
- (Greece) Giannis Christopoulos (4 Oct 2017 – 22 Jan 2018)
- (Cyprus) Nicos Panayiotou (22 Jan 2018 – 13 Mar 2018)
- (Cyprus) Chrysis Michael (26 Apr 2018 – 13 Jan 2019)
- (Cyprus) Nicolas Martides (13 Jan 2019 – 31 May 2019)
- (Cyprus) Liasos Louka (11 Jul 2019 – 26 Feb 2022)
- (Belarus) Aleksey Shpilevsky (26 Feb 2022 – 19 May 2025)
- (Belarus) Artsyom Radzkow (20 May 2025 – 10 Feb 2026)
- (Cyprus) Liasos Louka (10 Feb 2026 – 25 May 2026)
- (Belarus) Artsyom Radzkow (26 May 2026 –)

Aris Limassol won the 2022–23 Cypriot First Division with Aleksey Shpilevsky for the first time in the history of the team.

== Honours ==
- Cypriot First Division
  - Winners (1): 2022–23
- Cypriot Cup
  - Runners-up (1): 1988–89
- Cypriot Super Cup
  - Winners (1): 2023
- Cypriot Second Division
  - Winners (5): 1953–54, 1955–56, 1993–94, 2010–11, 2012–13

== European record ==
=== Matches ===
Season	Competition	Round	Club	Home	Away	Aggregate
2022–23	UEFA Europa Conference League	2Q	(Azerbaijan) Neftçi Baku	2–0	0–3	2–3
2023–24	UEFA Champions League	2Q	(Belarus) BATE Borisov	6–2	5–3	11–5
2023–24	UEFA Champions League	3Q	(Poland) Raków Częstochowa	0–1	1–2	1–3
2023–24	UEFA Europa League	PO	(Slovakia) Slovan Bratislava	6–2	1–2	7–4
2023–24	UEFA Europa League	GS	(Scotland) Rangers	2–1	1–1	4th
2023–24	UEFA Europa League	GS	(Spain) Real Betis	0–1	1–4	4th
2023–24	UEFA Europa League	GS	(Czech Republic) Sparta Prague	1–3	2–3	4th
2025–26	UEFA Conference League	2Q	(Hungary) Puskás Akadémia	3–2	2–0	5–2
2025–26	UEFA Conference League	3Q	(Greece) AEK Athens	2–2	1–3 (a.e.t.)	3–5

== UEFA club coefficient ranking ==
UEFA Team Ranking (2025/26)

=== UEFA Club ranking ===
Rank	Country	Team	Points
217	(Kosovo)	Drita	7.000
218	(Luxembourg)	Differdange	6.500
219	(Cyprus)	Aris Limassol	6.500
220	(Belarus)	Dinamo Minsk	6.500
221	(Albania)	Vllaznia	6.500

Last update: 3 September 2025
