= APOP Paphos FC =

APOP Paphos
- Full name: Athlitikos Podosfairikos Omilos Pafos
- Short name: APOP
- Founded: 1953; 73 years ago
- Dissolved: 2000; 26 years ago
- Ground: Pafiako Stadium

APOP Paphos (Greek: Αθλητικός Ποδοσφαιρικός Όμιλος Πάφου, Athlitikos Podosfairikos Omilos Pafos; "Athletic Football Club Paphos") was a Cypriot football club based in the city of Paphos. Founded in 1953, playing between the First and Second Division.

== History ==
The Pafos Athletic Football Club, or APOP Paphos was founded in 1953.

In contrast with the other Districts of Cyprus and other major towns, which had permanent teams in First Division, Paphos did not have such a team as the two clubs of the town, APOP Paphos and Evagoras Paphos, could not remain in First Division for many years. In 2000, the two clubs were merged to form AEP Paphos F.C.

== Trophies ==
- Cypriot Second Division:
  - Champions (6): 1966, 1971, 1973, 1975, 1977, 1996
