= PAEEK Kyrenia =

Cypriot sports club

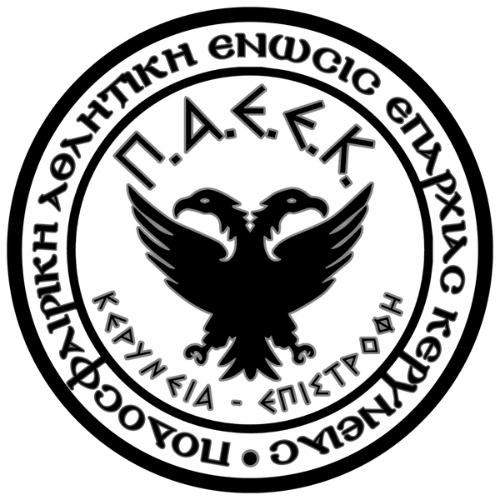
- Full name: Podosfairiki Athlitiki Enosis Eparxeias Kerynias
- Founded: 10 October 1953; 72 years ago
- Ground: Keryneia Epistrofi, Lakatamia
- Capacity: 2,500
- Chairman: Christos Meleounis
- League: Second Division
- 2025–26: Second Division, 4th of 16
- Website: http://www.paeek.cy/

PAEEK Kyrenia (Greek: ΠΑΕΕΚ; short for Ποδοσφαιρική Αθλητική Ένωσις Επαρχίας Κερύνειας, Podosfairiki Athlitiki Enosis Eparxeias Kerynias, translated as "Football and Sport Union of Kyrenia District", literally "Footballing Sportive Union of the District of Kyrenia") is a Cypriot sports club founded in Kyrenia in 1953 by graduates of Kyrenia Gymnasium and represented the first force to be reckoned from the small city. It now plays in exile in Nicosia since the Turkish invasion of Cyprus in July 1974. PAEEK Kyrenia has a Football Division, a Basketball Division, Runners Division and Women Beach Handball Division

== Basketball ==
Emblem of PAEEK 1977

The PAEEK was a founding member of the Cyprus Basketball Federation in 1966 rising to fame in the early 1970s after its basketball division won the Cyprus top division basketball league in 3 consecutive years. In 1974 during the Turkish invasion of Cyprus, were killed seven basketball players who played at the last championship. They were Giorgos Moustakas, Christos Karefilidis, Andreas Charalampous, Dinos and Louis Tsangaridis (siblings), Foivos Fieros and Giorgos Trigkis. After this tragedy the basketball club dissolved and refounded in 1989.

The PAEEK reached the Cyprus Basketball Cup final on 5 occasions, losing them all. In 1995 was APOEL's year, when they took the basketball double. As finalist of the Cup final, PAEEK automatically qualified to represent Cyprus in Europe in the Saporta Cup. They were knocked out by PAOK BC Salonika, which in turn went on to reach the final of the competition. The game with PAOK BC was very special for both teams, as they were all refugees and victims of the wars between Greece and Turkey, in 9th of September 1995 it was the fraternization ceremony.

PAEEK Kyrenia was reactivated in 2020 under adverse conditions. In the 2022/2023 season, he succeeded and won the championship and the B1 category cup. In the 2023/2024 season he competed in the Basket League (First Division) successfully, managing to stay in the division, but due to financial difficulties he chose to compete in the B1 division the following year. The head of the Basketball Division of PAEEK Kyrenia is the General Secretary of PAEEK Kyrenia, Mr. Christos Meleounis.

== Runners ==
On November 11, 2023, PAEEK Kyrenia following the initiative of the General Secretary of Mr. Christos Meleounis created a Division of Runners, who ran for the first time in the 40th Marathon of Athens and continue to this day with their motto "Our destination is Kyrenia".

== Football ==
The football team has not matched the basketball team's success in terms of trophies. They have been a mainstay in the Cyprus Second Division. PAEEK is considered to be the team with the most appearances in the Cyprus Second Division, with 41 in total. The club plays its home matches in Keryneia Epistrofi Stadium in Nicosia, Cyprus.

PAEEK has built a reputation for unearthing young talent and moving them on, most notably Alexandros Paschalakis of PAOK and the Greece national team, Giorgos Economides and Giorgos Papadopoulos.

=== Promotion to Top Division ===
During the 2020–21 season, PAEEK finished as champions of the second division and were promoted to the top division for the first time in club history.

=== Current squad ===
As of 15 September 2026

Note: Flags indicate national team as defined under FIFA eligibility rules; some limited exceptions apply. Players may hold more than one non-FIFA nationality.

No.	Pos.	Nation	Player
1	GK	CRO	Ivan Križanović
3	DF	CYP	Antonis Arnaoutis
6	MF	POR	Latón
7	FW	CYP	Alexandros Paschalidis
8	MF	CYP	Kyriakos Chrysomilis
9	FW	CYP	Angelos Zefki
10	MF	CYP	Markos Charalampous
13	DF	CYP	Viktoras Panagiotidis
14	DF	CYP	Marios Dimitriou
17	DF	CYP	Martinos Christofi
18	GK	CYP	Marios Athanasiou
19	FW	AUT	Aleksandar Vucenovic

No.	Pos.	Nation	Player
20	FW	ARG	Gino Albertengo
22	DF	POR	Alpoim
23	DF	SRB	Marko Dobrijević
24	MF	CYP	Giorgos Pavlidis
26	FW	GUI	Buby Katty
32	DF	CYP	Vangelis Kyriakou
70	FW	BRA	Guilherme Zimovski
76	DF	CYP	Michael Odysseos
77	DF	CYP	Pantelis Vasiliou
78	MF	CYP	Ioannis Tsoutsouki
88	MF	CYP	Panagiotis Panagi (on loan from AEL Limassol)
99	GK	CYP	Andreas Angelidis

== Colours ==
The colours of PAEEK shirt are symbolic, with the black symbolising the sadness from the Turkish invasion in 1974 and the white symbolises the hope that one day they will return to their hometown. When this happens the colours will change back to yellow and black as they were before the Turkish invasion.

== Honours ==
=== Basketball ===
- Cyprus Basketball Division 1
  - Winner (3): 1970, 1971, 1972
- Cypriot Basketball Cup
  - Runner-up (5): 1969, 1970, 1971, 1995, 1999
- Cypriot Basketball Super Cup
  - Winner (3): 1969, 1970, 1971
- Cyprus Basketball Division B
  - Winner (1): 2023
- Cypriot Basketball Cup Division B
  - Winner (1): 2023
- Greek A2 Basket League
  - Participation (3): 1970, 1971, 1972
- FIBA Saporta Cup
  - Participation (1): 1995

=== Football ===
- Cypriot Second Division
  - Winners (1): 2020–21
- Cypriot Third Division
  - Winners (3): 1991–92, 2002–03, 2007–08
