= 1958–59 Cypriot Cup =

Tournament details
- Country: Cyprus
- Dates: 9 April 1959 – 27 June 1959
- Teams: 18

Final positions
- Champions: Anorthosis Famagusta (2nd title)
- Runners-up: AEL Limassol

The 1958–59 Cypriot Cup was the 19th edition of the Cypriot Cup. A total of 18 clubs entered the competition. It began on 9 April 1959 with the first round and concluded on 27 June 1959 with the final which was held at GSP Stadium. Anorthosis Famagusta won their 2nd Cypriot Cup trophy after beating AEL Limassol 1–0 in the final.

== First round ==
Team 1	Agg.	Team 2	1st leg	2nd leg
(A΄) AEL Limassol	5 - 5^{1}	Apollon Limassol (A΄)	3 - 2	2 - 3
(B΄) Alki Larnaca	2 - 11	APOEL (A΄)	2 - 8	0 - 3
(A΄) Anorthosis Famagusta	8 - 2	Pezoporikos Larnaca (A΄)	8 - 0	0 - 2
(A΄) EPA Larnaca	14 - 3	AYMA (B΄)	12 - 0	2 - 3
(A΄) Olympiakos Nicosia	9 - 2	APOP Paphos (B΄)	5 - 0	4 - 2
(A΄) Orfeas Nicosia	2 - 8	AC Omonia (A΄)	2 - 1	0 - 7
(B΄) PAEEK	8 - 4	Amathus Limassol (B΄)	5 - 3	3 - 1
(B΄) Panellinios Limassol	3 - 4	Aris Limassol (A΄)	3 - 0	0 - 4
(A΄) Nea Salamis Famagusta	6 - 3	Enosis Agion Omologiton (B΄)	4 - 0	2 - 3

^{1}AEL qualified on draw

== Quarter-finals ==
Team 1	Result	Team 2
(A΄) AEL Limassol	3 - 2	EPA Larnaca (A΄)
(A΄) APOEL	4 - 0	Aris Limassol (A΄)
(A΄) Olympiakos Nicosia	3 - 0	Nea Salamis Famagusta (A΄)
(B΄) PAEEK	0 - 5	Anorthosis Famagusta (A΄)

Συμπληρωματικός αγώνας

Team 1	Result	Team 2
(A΄) AC Omonia	0 - 3	Anorthosis Famagusta (A΄)

== Semi-finals ==
Team 1	Result	Team 2
(A΄) AEL Limassol	3 - 3, 2 - 1	Olympiakos Nicosia (A΄)
(A΄) Anorthosis Famagusta	3 - 1	APOEL (A΄)

== Final ==
28 June 1959

Anorthosis Famagusta FC	1–0	AEL Limassol
Pantelakis Gerolemou 28' (pen.)

GSP Stadium (1902), Nicosia
Referee: Pampos Avraamides

Cypriot Cup 1958–59 Winners
Anorthosis Famagusta
2nd title

== Sources ==
- "1958/59 Cyprus Cup". RSSSF. 2017-08-24.

== Bibliography ==
- Gavreilides, Michalis; Papamoiseos, Stelios (2001). Ένας αιώνας Κυπριακό ποδόσφαιρο [One century Cypriot football] (in Greek). Nicosia: The writer. p. 69. ISBN 9963-8720-1-8.
- Meletiou, Giorgos (2011). Κυπριακό ποδόσφαιρο 1900–1960 [Cypriot Football 1900–1960] (in Greek). Nicosia: Power Publishing. pp. 270–271, 287. ISBN 978-9963-688-87-6.

== See also ==
- Cypriot Cup
