= 1948–49 Cypriot Cup =

Tournament details
- Country: Cyprus
- Dates: 13 March 1949 – 19 June 1949
- Teams: 8

Final positions
- Champions: Anorthosis (1st title)
- Runners-up: APOEL

The 1948–49 Cypriot Cup was the 12th edition of the Cypriot Cup. A total of 8 clubs entered the competition. It began on 13 March 1949 with the quarterfinals and concluded on 19 June 1949 with the replay final which was held at GSP Stadium. Anorthosis won their 1st Cypriot Cup trophy after beating APOEL 3–0 in the final.

== Format ==
In the 1948–49 Cypriot Cup, participated all the teams of the Cypriot First Division.

The competition consisted of three knock-out rounds. In all rounds each tie was played as a single leg and was held at the home ground of one of the two teams, according to the draw results. Each tie winner was qualifying to the next round. If a match was drawn, extra time was following. If extra time was drawn, there was a replay match.

== Quarter-finals ==
Team 1	Result	Team 2
(A) AEL	4–1	AYMA (A)
(A) Anorthosis	3–0	Pezoporikos (A)
(A) APOEL	3–0	Olympiakos (A)
(A) EPA	1–5	Lefkoşa Türk Spor Kulübü (A)

== Semi-finals ==
Team 1	Result	Team 2
(A) Anorthosis	5–0	Lefkoşa Türk Spor Kulübü (A)
(A) APOEL	3–2	AEL (A)

== Final ==
3 April 1949

Anorthosis	2–3	APOEL

GSP Stadium, Nicosia
Referee: Argyris Gavalas

Abandoned at 87', due to fights between players and in crowd

Replay final

19 June 1949

Anorthosis	3–0	APOEL
Frixos Thalassetis 33'; Tzortzis Avetisian 75'; Andreas Stilianides 84' (pen.)

GSP Stadium, Nicosia
Referee: Argyris Gavalas

Cypriot Cup 1948–49 Winners
Anorthosis
1st title

== Sources ==
- "1948/49 Cyprus Cup". RSSSF. 2017-08-24.

== Bibliography ==
- Gavreilides, Michalis; Papamoiseos, Stelios (2001). Ένας αιώνας Κυπριακό ποδόσφαιρο [One century Cypriot football] (in Greek). Nicosia: The writer. p. 51. ISBN 9963-8720-1-8.
- Meletiou, Giorgos (2011). Κυπριακό ποδόσφαιρο 1900–1960 [Cypriot Football 1900–1960] (in Greek). Nicosia: Power Publishing. pp. 148, 286. ISBN 978-9963-688-87-6.

== See also ==
- Cypriot Cup
- 1948–49 Cypriot First Division
