= 1938–39 Cypriot Cup =

Tournament details
- Country: Cyprus
- Dates: 23 April 1939 – 16 July 1939
- Teams: 7

Final positions
- Champions: AEL (1st title)
- Runners-up: APOEL

The 1938–39 Cypriot Cup was the fifth edition of the Cypriot Cup. A total of 7 clubs entered the competition. It began on 23 April 1939 with the preliminary round and concluded on 16 July 1939 with the final which was held at GSP Stadium. AEL won their 1st Cypriot Cup trophy after beating APOEL 3–1 in the final.

== Format ==
In the 1938–39 Cypriot Cup, participated all the teams of the Cypriot First Division.

The competition consisted of four knock-out rounds. In all rounds each tie was played as a single leg and was held at the home ground of one of the two teams, according to the draw results. Each tie winner was qualifying to the next round. If a match was drawn, extra time was following. If extra time was drawn, there was a replay match.

== Preliminary round ==
Team 1	Result	Team 2
(A) Lefkoşa Türk Spor Kulübü	4 - 0	Olympiakos (A)

== Quarter-finals ==
Team 1	Result	Team 2
(A) EPA	1 - 3	AEL (A)
(A) Aris	0 - 7	APOEL (A)
(A) Pezoporikos	2 - 3	Lefkoşa Türk Spor Kulübü (A)

== Semi-finals ==
Team 1	Result	Team 2
(A) AEL	2 - 0	Lefkoşa Türk Spor Kulübü (A)
(A) APOEL	Bye

== Final ==
16 July 1939

AEL	3 – 1	APOEL

GSP Stadium, Nicosia

Cypriot Cup 1938–39 Winners
AEL
1st title

== Sources ==
- "1938/39 Cyprus Cup". RSSSF. 2017-08-24.

== Bibliography ==
- Gavreilides, Michalis; Papamoiseos, Stelios (2001). Ένας αιώνας Κυπριακό ποδόσφαιρο [One century Cypriot football] (in Greek). Nicosia: The writer. p. 37. ISBN 9963-8720-1-8.
- Meletiou, Giorgos (2011). Κυπριακό ποδόσφαιρο 1900–1960 [Cypriot Football 1900–1960] (in Greek). Nicosia: Power Publishing. pp. 82, 285. ISBN 978-9963-688-87-6.

== See also ==
- Cypriot Cup
- 1938–39 Cypriot First Division
