= 1952–53 Cypriot Cup =

Tournament details
- Country: Cyprus
- Dates: 10 January 1953 – 19 April 1953
- Teams: 14

Final positions
- Champions: EPA Larnaca FC (4th title)
- Runners-up: Çetinkaya Türk

The 1952–53 Cypriot Cup was the 16th edition of the Cypriot Cup. A total of 14 clubs entered the competition. It began on 10 January 1953 with the first round and concluded on 19 April 1953 with the final which was held at GSP Stadium. EPA Larnaca FC won their 4th Cypriot Cup trophy after beating Çetinkaya Türk 2–1 in the final.

== Format ==
In the 1952–53 Cypriot Cup, participated all the teams of the Cypriot First Division and six teams of the Cypriot Second Division.

The competition consisted of four knock-out rounds. In all rounds each tie was played as a single leg and was held at the home ground of one of the two teams, according to the draw results. Each tie winner was qualifying to the next round. If a match was drawn, extra time was following. If extra time was drawn, there was a replay match.

== First round ==
Team 1	Result	Team 2
(A) AEL	5 - 0	SEAAS Nicosia (B)
(A) Anorthosis	7 - 1	Demi Spor Larnaca (B)
(A) APOEL	1 - 0	Pezoporikos (A)
(A) EPA	10 - 1	Aris (B)
(A) Çetinkaya Türk	10 - 2	Mağusa Türk Gücü (B)
(B) Turkish Club of Larnaca	2 - 3	Doğan Türk Birliği (B)
(A) Olymoiakos	Bye
(A) AYMA	Bye

== Quarter-finals ==
Team 1	Result	Team 2
(A) Anorthosis	2 - 1	Olympiakos (A)
(A) APOEL	2 - 2, 0 - 3	EPA (A)
(A) Çetinkaya Türk	3 - 1	AYMA (A)
(A) AEL	2 - 0	Doğan Türk Birliği (B)

== Semi-finals ==
Team 1	Result	Team 2
(A) AEL	1 - 2	Çetinkaya Türk (A)
(A) EPA	1 - 1^{1}	Anorthosis (A)

^{1}Anorthosis Famagusta not show to the replay match due to violent behavior of the first game

== Final ==
19 April 1953

EPA	2 – 1	Çetinkaya Türk
Sarkis Mpetikian (Kkilis) 17'; Mustafa Defteralı 74'		73' Dickran Misirian

GSP Stadium, Nicosia
Referee: Lillis Ieronimides

Cypriot Cup 1952–53 Winners
EPA
4th title

== Sources ==
- "1952/53 Cyprus Cup". RSSSF. 2017-08-24.

== Bibliography ==
- Gavreilides, Michalis; Papamoiseos, Stelios (2001). Ένας αιώνας Κυπριακό ποδόσφαιρο [One century Cypriot football] (in Greek). Nicosia: The writer. p. 59. ISBN 9963-8720-1-8.
- Meletiou, Giorgos (2011). Κυπριακό ποδόσφαιρο 1900–1960 [Cypriot Football 1900–1960] (in Greek). Nicosia: Power Publishing. pp. 190–191, 287. ISBN 978-9963-688-87-6.

== See also ==
- Cypriot Cup
- 1952–53 Cypriot First Division
