= 1946–47 Cypriot Cup =

Tournament details
- Country: Cyprus
- Dates: 2 March 1947 – 27 April 1947
- Teams: 7

Final positions
- Champions: APOEL (3rd title)
- Runners-up: Anorthosis

The 1946–47 Cypriot Cup was the tenth edition of the Cypriot Cup. A total of 7 clubs entered the competition. It began on 2 March 1947 with the quarterfinals and concluded on 27 April 1947 with the final which was held at GSP Stadium. APOEL won their 3rd Cypriot Cup trophy after beating Anorthosis 4–1 in the final.

== Format ==
In the 1946–47 Cypriot Cup, participated all the teams of the Cypriot First Division.

The competition consisted of three knock-out rounds. In all rounds each tie was played as a single leg and was held at the home ground of one of the two teams, according to the draw results. Each tie winner was qualifying to the next round. If a match was drawn, extra time was following. If extra time was drawn, there was a replay match.

== Quarter-finals ==
Team 1	Result	Team 2
(A') Anorthosis	3 - 0	Lefkoşa Türk Spor Kulübü (A')
(A') APOEL	4 - 1	AEL (A')
(A') Olympiakos	3 - 2	Pezoporikos (A')
(A') EPA	Bye

== Semi-finals ==
Team 1	Result	Team 2
(A') Anorthosis	3 - 1	EPA (A')
(A') APOEL	4 - 0	Olympiakos (A')

== Final ==
27 April 1947

APOEL	4 – 1	Anorthosis Famagusta
Likourgos Archontides 01'; Kostas Vasiliou 35'; Andreas Pavlou (Keremezos) 58'; Pampos Avraamides 90'		52' Kostakis Antoniades

GSP Stadium, Nicosia
Referee: Argyris Gavalas

Cypriot Cup 1946–47 Winners
APOEL
3rd title

== Sources ==
- "1946/47 Cyprus Cup". RSSSF. 2017-08-24.

== Bibliography ==
- Gavreilides, Michalis; Papamoiseos, Stelios (2001). Ένας αιώνας Κυπριακό ποδόσφαιρο [One century Cypriot football] (in Greek). Nicosia: The writer. p. 47. ISBN 9963-8720-1-8.
- Meletiou, Giorgos (2011). Κυπριακό ποδόσφαιρο 1900–1960 [Cypriot Football 1900–1960] (in Greek). Nicosia: Power Publishing. pp. 116, 286. ISBN 978-9963-688-87-6.

== See also ==
- Cypriot Cup
- 1946–47 Cypriot First Division
