= 1949–50 Cypriot Cup =

Tournament details
- Country: Cyprus
- Dates: 26 February 1950 – 23 April 1950
- Teams: 8

Final positions
- Champions: EPA (3rd title)
- Runners-up: Anorthosis

The 1949–50 Cypriot Cup was the 13th edition of the Cypriot Cup. A total of 8 clubs entered the competition. It began on 26 February 1950 with the quarterfinals and concluded on 23 April 1950 with the replay final which was held at GSP Stadium. EPA won their 3rd Cypriot Cup trophy after beating Anorthosis 2–1 in the final.

== Format ==
In the 1949–50 Cypriot Cup, participated all the teams of the Cypriot First Division.

The competition consisted of three knock-out rounds. In all rounds each tie was played as a single leg and was held at the home ground of one of the two teams, according to the draw results. Each tie winner was qualifying to the next round. If a match was drawn, extra time was following. If extra time was drawn, there was a replay match.

== Quarter-finals ==
Team 1	Result	Team 2
(A) Anorthosis	2 - 1	Olympiakos (A)
(A) AEL	1 - 3	EPA (A)
(A) Pezoporikos	2 - 1	AYMA (A)
(A) Çetinkaya Türk	1 - 0	APOEL (A)

== Semi-finals ==
Team 1	Result	Team 2
(A) Anorthosis	3 - 2	Pezoporikos (A)
(A) EPA	3 - 1	Çetinkaya Türk (A)

== Final ==
19 March 1950

EPA	0 – 1	Anorthosis
		Costas Vasileiou 79'

GSP Stadium, Nicosia
Referee: Vasos Aivaliotis

Abandoned at 82', due to pitch invasion.

Replay final

23 April 1950

EPA	2 – 1	Anorthosis
Andreas Drousiotis 14'; Aram Terzian 88' (pen.)		35' Antonis Papadopoulos

GSP Stadium, Nicosia
Referee: Argyris Gavalas

Cypriot Cup 1949–50 Winners
EPA
3rd title

== Sources ==
- "1949/50 Cyprus Cup". RSSSF. 2017-08-24.

== Bibliography ==
- Gavreilides, Michalis; Papamoiseos, Stelios (2001). Ένας αιώνας Κυπριακό ποδόσφαιρο [One century Cypriot football] (in Greek). Nicosia: The writer. p. 53. ISBN 9963-8720-1-8.
- Meletiou, Giorgos (2011). Κυπριακό ποδόσφαιρο 1900–1960 [Cypriot Football 1900–1960] (in Greek). Nicosia: Power Publishing. pp. 159, 286. ISBN 978-9963-688-87-6.

== See also ==
- Cypriot Cup
- 1949–50 Cypriot First Division
