= 1951–52 Cypriot Cup =

Tournament details
- Country: Cyprus
- Dates: 9 March 1952 – 6 April 1952
- Teams: 8

Final positions
- Champions: Çetinkaya Türk (1st title)
- Runners-up: Pezoporikos

The 1951–52 Cypriot Cup was the 15th edition of the Cypriot Cup. A total of 8 clubs entered the competition. It began on 9 March 1952 with the quarterfinals and concluded on 6 April 1952 with the final which was held at GSP Stadium. Çetinkaya Türk won their 1st Cypriot Cup trophy after beating Pezoporikos 4–1 in the final.

== Format ==
In the 1951–52 Cypriot Cup, participated all the teams of the Cypriot First Division.

The competition consisted of three knock-out rounds. In all rounds each tie was played as a single leg and was held at the home ground of one of the two teams, according to the draw results. Each tie winner was qualifying to the next round. If a match was drawn, extra time was following. If extra time was drawn, there was a replay match.

== Quarter-finals ==
Team 1	Result	Team 2
(A) AEL Limassol	3 - 1	Armenian Young Men's Association (A)
(A) Anorthosis Famagusta FC	0 - 3	Pezoporikos Larnaca FC (A)
(A) APOEL FC	4 - 0	Olympiakos Nicosia (A)
(A) EPA Larnaca FC	0 - 4	Çetinkaya Türk S.K. (A)

== Semi-finals ==
Team 1	Result	Team 2
(A) APOEL FC	0 - 3	Pezoporikos Larnaca FC (A)
(A) Çetinkaya Türk S.K.	1 - 0	AEL Limassol (A)

== Final ==
6 April 1952

Çetinkaya Türk	4 – 1	Pezoporikos
Mehmet Bardak 40'; Vedat Salih (Jipsis) 56'; Mehmet Bardak 60'; Vedat Salih (Jipsis) 74'		Andreas Pirgos 55'

GSP Stadium, Nicosia
Referee: Mishel Iosifides

Cypriot Cup 1951–52 Winners
Çetinkaya Türk
1st title

== Sources ==
- "1951/52 Cyprus Cup". RSSSF. 2017-08-24.

== Bibliography ==
- Gavreilides, Michalis; Papamoiseos, Stelios (2001). Ένας αιώνας Κυπριακό ποδόσφαιρο [One century Cypriot football] (in Greek). Nicosia: The writer. p. 57. ISBN 9963-8720-1-8.
- Meletiou, Giorgos (2011). Κυπριακό ποδόσφαιρο 1900–1960 [Cypriot Football 1900–1960] (in Greek). Nicosia: Power Publishing. pp. 182–183, 287. ISBN 978-9963-688-87-6.

== See also ==
- Cypriot Cup
- 1951–52 Cypriot First Division
