= 1950–51 Cypriot Cup =

Tournament details
- Country: Cyprus
- Dates: 14 January 1951 – 25 February 1951
- Teams: 8

Final positions
- Champions: APOEL (4th title)
- Runners-up: EPA

The 1950–51 Cypriot Cup was the 14th edition of the Cypriot Cup. A total of 8 clubs entered the competition. It began on 14 January 1951 with the quarterfinals and concluded on 25 February 1951 with the replay final which was held at GSP Stadium. APOEL won their 4th Cypriot Cup trophy after beating EPA 7–0 in the final.

== Format ==
In the 1950–51 Cypriot Cup, participated all the teams of the Cypriot First Division.

The competition consisted of three knock-out rounds. In all rounds each tie was played as a single leg and was held at the home ground of one of the two teams, according to the draw results. Each tie winner was qualifying to the next round. If a match was drawn, extra time was following. If extra time was drawn, there was a replay match.

== Quarter-finals ==
Team 1	Result	Team 2
(A) Anorthosis	1 - 0	AEL (A)
(A) Çetinkaya Türk	2 - 5	EPA (A)
(A) Olympiakos	2 - 1	AYMA (A)
(A) APOEL	2 - 1	Pezoporikos (A)

== Semi-finals ==
Team 1	Result	Team 2
(A) Anorthosis	2 - 3	EPA (A)
(A) Olympiakos	0 - 1	APOEL (A)

== Final ==
18 February 1951

APOEL	0 – 0	EPA

GSP Stadium, Nicosia

Abandoned at the initial stage due to rain

Replay final

25 February 1951

APOEL	7 – 0	EPA
Erodotos Georgiades 22'; Mikis Ioannides 35'; Giorgos Savvas (Kotsios) 51'; Andreas Pavlou (Keremezos) 59'; Andreas Stavrinides (Siantris) 67'; Andreas Stavrinides (Siantris) 69'; Andreas Pavlou (Keremezos) 83'

GSP Stadium, Nicosia
Referee: Faik Mouftizate

Cypriot Cup 1950–51 Winners
APOEL
4th title

== Sources ==
- "1950/51 Cyprus Cup". RSSSF. 2017-08-24.

== Bibliography ==
- Gavreilides, Michalis; Papamoiseos, Stelios (2001). Ένας αιώνας Κυπριακό ποδόσφαιρο [One century Cypriot football] (in Greek). Nicosia: The writer. p. 55. ISBN 9963-8720-1-8.
- Meletiou, Giorgos (2011). Κυπριακό ποδόσφαιρο 1900–1960 [Cypriot Football 1900–1960] (in Greek). Nicosia: Power Publishing. pp. 174–175, 287. ISBN 978-9963-688-87-6.

== See also ==
- Cypriot Cup
- 1950–51 Cypriot First Division
