= 1945–46 Cypriot Cup =

Tournament details
- Country: Cyprus
- Dates: 3 February 1946 – 14 April 1946
- Teams: 6

Final positions
- Champions: EPA (2nd title)
- Runners-up: APOEL

The 1945–46 Cypriot Cup was the ninth edition of the Cypriot Cup. A total of 6 clubs entered the competition. It began on 3 February 1946 with the quarterfinals and concluded on 14 April 1946 with the final which was held at GSP Stadium. EPA won their 2nd Cypriot Cup trophy after beating APOEL 2–1 in the final.

== Format ==
In the 1945–46 Cypriot Cup, participated all the teams of the Cypriot First Division.

The competition consisted of three knock-out rounds. In all rounds each tie was played as a single leg and was held at the home ground of one of the two teams, according to the draw results. Each tie winner was qualifying to the next round. If a match was drawn, extra time was following. If extra time was drawn, there was a replay match.

== Quarter-finals ==
Team 1	Result	Team 2
(A) AEL Limassol	2 - 2, 5 - 6	Pezoporikos Larnaca (A)
(A) APOEL	9 - 0	Lefkoşa Türk Spor Kulübü (A)
(A) EPA Larnaca	Bye
(A) Olympiakos Nicosia	Bye

== Semi-finals ==
Team 1	Result	Team 2
(A) APOEL	4 - 0	Olympiakos Nicosia (A)
(A) EPA Larnaca	2 - 1	Pezoporikos Larnaca (A)

== Final ==
14 April 1946

EPA Larnaca	3 – 1	APOEL
Andreas Georgiades 10'; Andreas Georgiades 47'; Dikran Misirian 68'		01' Takis Sokratous (Zetas)

GSP Stadium, Nicosia
Referee: Spyros Elia

Cypriot Cup 1945–46 Winners
EPA Larnaca
2nd title

== Sources ==
- "1945/46 Cyprus Cup". RSSSF. 2017-08-24.

== Bibliography ==
- Gavreilides, Michalis; Papamoiseos, Stelios (2001). Ένας αιώνας Κυπριακό ποδόσφαιρο [One century Cypriot football] (in Greek). Nicosia: The writer. p. 45. ISBN 9963-8720-1-8.
- Meletiou, Giorgos (2011). Κυπριακό ποδόσφαιρο 1900–1960 [Cypriot Football 1900–1960] (in Greek). Nicosia: Power Publishing. pp. 108–109, 285. ISBN 978-9963-688-87-6.

== See also ==
- Cypriot Cup
- 1945–46 Cypriot First Division
