= 1947–48 Cypriot Cup =

Tournament details
- Country: Cyprus
- Dates: 18 January 1948 – 1 February 1948
- Teams: 5

Final positions
- Champions: AEL (3rd title)
- Runners-up: APOEL

The 1947–48 Cypriot Cup was the 11th edition of the Cypriot Cup. A total of 5 clubs entered the competition. It began on 18 January 1948 with the quarterfinals and concluded on 1 February 1947 with the final which was held at GSP Stadium. AEL won their 3rd Cypriot Cup trophy after beating APOEL 2–0 in the final.

== Format ==
In the 1947–48 Cypriot Cup, participated all the teams of the Cypriot First Division.

The competition consisted of three knock-out rounds. In all rounds each tie was played as a single leg and was held at the home ground of one of the two teams, according to the draw results. Each tie winner was qualifying to the next round. If a match was drawn, extra time was following. If extra time was drawn, there was a replay match.

== Quarter-finals ==
| Team 1 | Result | Team 2 |
|---|---|---|
| (A) AEL | 4 - 0 | AYMA (A) |
| (A) APOEL | Bye |
| (A) Olympiakos | Bye |
| (A) Lefkoşa Türk Spor Kulübü | Bye |

== Semi-finals ==
| Team 1 | Result | Team 2 |
|---|---|---|
| (A) AEL | 3 - 2 | Olympiakos (A) |
| (A) APOEL | 8 - 1 | Lefkoşa Türk Spor Kulübü (A) |

== Final ==
1 February 1948

| AEL | 2 – 0 | APOEL |
|---|---|---|
| Panikos Aradipiotis 82'; Panikos Aradipiotis 84' |

GSP Stadium, Nicosia
Referee: Faik Mouftizate

Cypriot Cup 1947–48 Winners
AEL
3rd title

== Sources ==
- "1947/48 Cyprus Cup". RSSSF. 2017-08-24.

== Bibliography ==
- Gavreilides, Michalis; Papamoiseos, Stelios (2001). Ένας αιώνας Κυπριακό ποδόσφαιρο [One century Cypriot football] (in Greek). Nicosia: The writer. p. 49. ISBN 9963-8720-1-8.
- Meletiou, Giorgos (2011). Κυπριακό ποδόσφαιρο 1900–1960 [Cypriot Football 1900–1960] (in Greek). Nicosia: Power Publishing. pp. 128–129, 286. ISBN 978-9963-688-87-6.

== See also ==
- Cypriot Cup
- 1947–48 Cypriot First Division
