= 1944–45 Cypriot Cup =

Tournament details
- Country: Cyprus
- Dates: 18 February 1945 – 15 April 1945
- Teams: 6

Final positions
- Champions: EPA (1st title)
- Runners-up: APOEL

The 1944–45 Cypriot Cup was the eighth edition of the Cypriot Cup. A total of 6 clubs entered the competition. It began on 18 February 1945 with the quarterfinals and concluded on 15 April 1945 with the final which was held at GSP Stadium. EPA won their 1st Cypriot Cup trophy after beating APOEL 3–1 in the final.

== Format ==
In the 1944–45 Cypriot Cup, participated all the teams of the Cypriot First Division.

The competition consisted of three knock-out rounds. In all rounds each tie was played as a single leg and was held at the home ground of one of the two teams, according to the draw results. Each tie winner was qualifying to the next round. If a match was drawn, extra time was following. If extra time was drawn, there was a replay match.

== Quarter-finals ==
Team 1	Result	Team 2
(A) AEL	1 - 0	Lefkoşa Türk Spor Kulübü (A)
(A) APOEL	4 - 0	Olympiakos (A)
(A) EPA	Bye
(A) Pezoporikos	Bye

== Semi-finals ==
Team 1	Result	Team 2
(A) APOEL	2 - 0^{1}	Pezoporikos (A)
(A) AEL	3 - 4	EPA (A)

^{1}Abandoned at 2 - 0, Pezoporikos walked off.

== Final ==
14 April 1945

EPA	3 – 1	APOEL
Kokos Chimonides 50'; Kokos Chimonides 62'; Dikran Misirian 68'		30' Likourgos Archontides

GSP Stadium, Nicosia
Referee: Faik Mouftizate

Cypriot Cup 1944–45 Winners
EPA Larnaca
1st title

== Sources ==
- "1944/45 Cyprus Cup". RSSSF. 2017-08-24.

== Bibliography ==
- Gavreilides, Michalis; Papamoiseos, Stelios (2001). Ένας αιώνας Κυπριακό ποδόσφαιρο [One century Cypriot football] (in Greek). Nicosia: The writer. p. 43. ISBN 9963-8720-1-8.
- Meletiou, Giorgos (2011). Κυπριακό ποδόσφαιρο 1900–1960 [Cypriot Football 1900–1960] (in Greek). Nicosia: Power Publishing. pp. 102, 285. ISBN 978-9963-688-87-6.

== See also ==
- Cypriot Cup
- 1944–45 Cypriot First Division
