= 1939–40 Cypriot Cup =

Tournament details
- Country: Cyprus
- Dates: 14 January 1940 – 18 February 1940
- Teams: 6

Final positions
- Champions: AEL (2nd title)
- Runners-up: Pezoporikos

The 1939–40 Cypriot Cup was the sixth edition of the Cypriot Cup. A total of 6 clubs entered the competition. It began on 14 January 1940 with the quarterfinals and concluded on 18 February 1940 with the replay final which was held at GSP Stadium. AEL won their 2nd Cypriot Cup trophy after beating Pezoporikos 3–1 in the final.

== Format ==
In the 1939–40 Cypriot Cup, participated all the teams of the Cypriot First Division.

The competition consisted of three knock-out rounds. In all rounds each tie was played as a single leg and was held at the home ground of one of the two teams, according to the draw results. Each tie winner was qualifying to the next round. If a match was drawn, extra time was following. If extra time was drawn, there was a replay match.

== Quarter-finals ==
Team 1	Result	Team 2
(A) AEL	1 - 1, 5 - 0	Olympiakos (A)
(A) Pezoporikos	7 - 4	EPA (A)
(A) APOEL	Bye
(A) Lefkoşa Türk Spor Kulübü	Bye

== Semi-finals ==
Team 1	Result	Team 2
(A) AEL	2 - 0	APOEL (A)
(A) Pezoporikos	5 - 2	Lefkoşa Türk Spor Kulübü (A)

== Final ==
11 February 1940

AEL	1 – 1	Pezoporikos
Panikos Aradipiotis 10'

GSP Stadium, Nicosia
Referee: Andreas Papamichael

The final abandoned after the first half due to rain. A replay match was played.

18 February 1940

AEL	3 – 1	Pezoporikos
Kostas Aivaliotis 48'; Panikos Aradipiotis 65'; Panikos Aradipiotis 70'		30' Takis Taliadoros

GSP Stadium, Nicosia
Referee: József Künsztler

Cypriot Cup 1939–40 Winners
AEL
2nd title

== Sources ==
- "1939/40 Cyprus Cup". RSSSF. 2017-08-24.

== Bibliography ==
- Gavreilides, Michalis; Papamoiseos, Stelios (2001). Ένας αιώνας Κυπριακό ποδόσφαιρο [One century Cypriot football] (in Greek). Nicosia: The writer. p. 39. ISBN 9963-8720-1-8.
- Meletiou, Giorgos (2011). Κυπριακό ποδόσφαιρο 1900–1960 [Cypriot Football 1900–1960] (in Greek). Nicosia: Power Publishing. pp. 85–88, 285. ISBN 978-9963-688-87-6.

== See also ==
- Cypriot Cup
- 1939–40 Cypriot First Division
