= 1940–41 Cypriot Cup =

Tournament details
- Country: Cyprus
- Dates: 6 April 1941 – 11 May 1941
- Teams: 4

Final positions
- Champions: APOEL (2nd title)
- Runners-up: AEL

The 1940–41 Cypriot Cup was the seventh edition of the Cypriot Cup. A total of 4 clubs entered the competition. It began on 6 April 1940 with the semifinals and concluded on 11 May 1940 with the final which was held at GSP Stadium. APOEL won their 2nd Cypriot Cup trophy after beating AEL 2–1 in the final.

== Format ==
In the 1940–41 Cypriot Cup, participated all the teams of the Cypriot First Division (Lefkoşa Türk Spor Kulübü withdrew from the league before the cup started).

The competition consisted of two knockout rounds. In each round, each tie was played as a single leg and was held at the home ground of one of the two teams, determined by the draw results. The winner of each tie qualified for the next round. In the event of a drawn match, extra time was played. If extra time also ended in a draw, a replay match was scheduled.

== Semi-finals ==
Team 1	Result	Team 2
(A) AEL	9 - 0	EPA (A)
(A) APOEL	5 - 0	Olympiakos (A)

== Final ==
11 May 1941

APOEL	2 – 1	AEL
Andreas Karamanis 37'; Giorgos Lampertides		Pampos Michalas

GSP Stadium, Nicosia
Referee: Spyros Elia

Cypriot Cup 1940–41 Winners
APOEL
2nd title

== Sources ==
- "1940/41 Cyprus Cup". RSSSF. 2017-08-24.

== Bibliography ==
- Gavreilides, Michalis; Papamoiseos, Stelios (2001). Ένας αιώνας Κυπριακό ποδόσφαιρο [One century Cypriot football] (in Greek). Nicosia: The writer. p. 41. ISBN 9963-8720-1-8.
- Meletiou, Giorgos (2011). Κυπριακό ποδόσφαιρο 1900–1960 [Cypriot Football 1900–1960] (in Greek). Nicosia: Power Publishing. p. 285. ISBN 978-9963-688-87-6.

== See also ==
- Cypriot Cup
- 1940–41 Cypriot First Division
