= 1954–55 Cypriot Cup =

Tournament details
- Country: Cyprus
- Dates: 18 June 1955 – 10 July 1955
- Teams: 16

Final positions
- Champions: EPA Larnaca (5th title)
- Runners-up: Pezoporikos

The 1954–55 Cypriot Cup was the 18th edition of the Cypriot Cup. A total of 16 clubs entered the competition. It began on 18 June 1955 with the first round and concluded on 10 July 1955 with the final which was held at GSP Stadium. EPA Larnaca won their 5th Cypriot Cup trophy after beating Pezoporikos 2–1 in the final.

== Format ==
In the 1954–55 Cypriot Cup, participated the 10 teams of the Cypriot First Division and 6 of the 11 teams of the Cypriot Second Division (the three winners of each group and other three teams after a draw between the other 8 second division teams).

The competition consisted of four knock-out rounds. In all rounds each tie was played as a single leg and was held at the home ground of one of the two teams, according to the draw results. Each tie winner was qualifying to the next round. If a match was drawn, extra time was following. If extra time was drawn, there was a replay match.

== First round ==
Team 1	Result	Team 2
(A) AEL Limassol	4 - 2	Orfeas Nicosia (B)
(A) Anorthosis Famagusta	3 - 2	Mağusa Türk Gücü (B)
(A) Aris Limassol	0 - 1	AC Omonia (A)
(A) EPA Larnaca	3 - 2	Demi Spor Larnaca (B)
(A) Olympiakos Nicosia	1 - 0	AYMA (A)
(A) Pezoporikos Larnaca	10 - 0	Antaeus Limassol (B)
(B) Nea Salamis	3 - 2	APOEL (A)
(A) Çetinkaya Türk	7 - 0	Gençlik Gücü S.K. (B)

== Quarter-finals ==
Team 1	Result	Team 2
(A) Anorthosis Famagusta	4 - 1	AEL Limassol (A)
(A) Olympiakos Nicosia	2 - 2, 0 - 4	EPA Larnaca (A)
(B) Nea Salamis Famagusta	2 - 4 (aet)	Pezoporikos Larnaca (A)
(A) Çetinkaya Türk	3 - 2	AC Omonia (A)

== Semi-finals ==
Team 1	Result	Team 2
(A) EPA Larnaca	3 - 2	Anorthosis Famagusta (A)
(A) Çetinkaya Türk	1 - 4	Pezoporikos Larnaca (A)

== Final ==
10 July 1954

EPA Larnaca	2 – 1	Pezoporikos
Aram Terzian 03'; Kostakis Louroutziatis 60'		62' Aristos Kaisidis

GSP Stadium, Nicosia
Referee: Ali Sitki

Cypriot Cup 1954–55 Winners
EPA Larnaca
5th title

== Sources ==
- "1954/55 Cyprus Cup". RSSSF. 2017-08-24.

== Bibliography ==
- Gavreilides, Michalis; Papamoiseos, Stelios (2001). Ένας αιώνας Κυπριακό ποδόσφαιρο [One century Cypriot football] (in Greek). Nicosia: The writer. p. 63. ISBN 9963-8720-1-8.
- Meletiou, Giorgos (2011). Κυπριακό ποδόσφαιρο 1900–1960 [Cypriot Football 1900–1960] (in Greek). Nicosia: Power Publishing. pp. 233–234, 287. ISBN 978-9963-688-87-6.

== See also ==
- Cypriot Cup
- 1954–55 Cypriot First Division
