= Neophytos Larkou =

Cypriot footballer (born 1966)

Personal information
- Full name: Neophytos Larkou
- Date of birth: 8 March 1966 (age 60)
- Place of birth: Larnaca, Cyprus
- Height: 1.79 m (5 ft 10 in)
- Position: Midfielder

Senior career*
Years	Team	Apps	(Gls)
1987–1994	Pezoporikos	94	(14)
1994–2001	AEK Larnaca	150	(15)
Total		244	(29)

International career^{‡}
1991–1997	Cyprus	41	(2)

Managerial career
- 2003–2004: ASIL
- 2004: AEK Larnaca
- 2007–2008: ASIL
- 2009–2011: Cyprus (assistant manager)
- 2011–2012: AC Omonia
- 2012–2013: Alki Larnaca
- 2014: Nea Salamina
- 2016: Anorthosis Famagusta
- * Club domestic league appearances and goals as of 17 March 2008 ‡ National team caps and goals as of 17 March 2008

Neophytos Larkou (Greek: Νεόφυτος Λάρκου; born 8 March 1966) is a former international Cypriot football midfielder, he is currently a football manager.

== Career ==
He started his career from Pezoporikos but when Pezoporikos merged with EPA Larnaca, and AEK Larnaca was founded, he continued his career in AEK.

== International career ==
As footballer, he made 41 appearances with scoring two goals. In 2009, CFA appointed him as the assistant manager of Angelos Anastasiadis in the Cyprus national football team.

== Coach ==
On 15 April 2011 he signed a contract with AC Omonoia, and managed to lead the team to the Cyprus Cup Final against Apollon Limassol. Omonoia would go on and win the final after a penalty shoot-out.

The 2011-2012 season did not start off without controversy for Larkou. While he had Omonia in first place, and on the right path, and playing excellent football, he along with president Miltiadis Neofytou, were accused, by a referee, for allegedly attacking him after a match. To make matters even worse, the Cyprus Football Association not only found them both guilty, but decided to discipline Larkou and Neofytou at the maximum possible level: a 6 month ban from the pitch. This would be the first time in his 28 year football career, Larkou faced any type of suspension. After a series of unfortunate results Larkou stepped down as coach of the club on 19 September 2012.

== Honours ==
=== Manager ===
==== Omonia Nicosia ====
Winner

- Cypriot Cup: 2011, 2012
- Cyprus FA Shield: 2012
