= 1948–49 Cypriot First Division =

Football season

Cypriot First Division
- Season: 1948–49

The 1948–49 Cypriot First Division was the 12th season of the Cypriot top-level football league.

== Overview ==
It was contested by 8 teams, and APOEL F.C. won the championship.

== League standings ==
Pos	Team	Pld	W	D	L	GF	GA	GD	Pts
1	APOEL F.C. (C)	14	14	0	0	51	20	+31	28
2	Anorthosis Famagusta FC	14	10	1	3	58	26	+32	21
3	Pezoporikos Larnaca	14	9	1	4	42	40	+2	19
4	AEL Limassol	14	5	5	4	31	25	+6	15
5	EPA Larnaca FC	14	4	1	9	25	36	−11	9
6	AYMA	14	2	5	7	32	36	−4	9
7	Olympiakos Nicosia	14	2	2	10	22	41	−19	6
8	Lefkoşa Türk Spor Kulübü	14	2	1	11	21	58	−37	5

(C) Champions

== Results ==
Home \ Away	AEL	ANR	APN	AYM	EPA	OLY	POL	LTS
AEL		1–2	1–3	–	–	1–1	2–2	6–2
Anorthosis	–		0–2	3–2	8–2	2–1	–	–
APOEL	3–2	2–0		3–1	4–2	2–0	5–3	4–2
AYMA	1–1	–	2–3		4–1	3–5	3–4	–
EPA	2–1	–	1–3	–		4–1	1–3	4–3
Olympiakos	–	–	1–5	–	–		–	–
Pezoporikos	–	4–4	3–5	–	–	3–1		2–1
LTSK	–	2–4	2–7	2–2	–	3–2	–	

Legend: Blue = home team win; Yellow = draw; Red = away team win.
