= 1950–51 Cypriot First Division =

Cypriot First Division
- Season: 1950–51

The 1950–51 Cypriot First Division was the 14th season of the Cypriot top-level football league.

== Overview ==
It was contested by 8 teams, and Çetinkaya Türk S.K. won the championship.

== League standings ==
Pos	Team	Pld	W	D	L	GF	GA	GD	Pts
1	Çetinkaya Türk S.K. (C)	14	8	4	2	36	26	+10	20
2	APOEL F.C.	14	6	6	2	38	21	+17	18
3	Anorthosis Famagusta FC	14	6	5	3	31	24	+7	17
4	Pezoporikos Larnaca	14	5	4	5	30	28	+2	14
5	EPA Larnaca FC	14	6	2	6	31	32	−1	14
6	AEL Limassol	14	5	1	8	33	36	−3	11
7	AYMA	14	4	1	9	25	40	−15	9
8	Olympiakos Nicosia	14	2	5	7	22	39	−17	9

(C) Champions

== Results ==
Home \ Away	AEL	ANR	APN	AYM	EPA	OLY	POL	ÇET
AEL		4–0	4–3	3–1	2–3	6–0	2–4	0–1
Anorthosis	5–1		2–2	3–1	3–1	3–2	4–1	2–2
APOEL	1–1	0–0		7–0	3–1	2–2	2–2	4–1
AYMA	1–2	2–1	1–5		6–0	3–0	3–1	3–5
EPA	6–2	2–2	1–0	3–2		7–3	2–1	1–2
Olympiakos	3–2	1–3	1–2	2–2	1–0		1–1	4–4
Pezoporikos	3–1	2–2	3–3	5–0	3–2	3–1		1–3
Çetinkaya	5–3	3–1	2–4	3–0	2–2	1–1	2–0	

Legend: Blue = home team win; Yellow = draw; Red = away team win.
