= Victoria București in European football =

Victoria București competed in UEFA football competitions. Their best performance was reaching the quarterfinals of the 1988–89 UEFA Cup where they lost to Dynamo Dresden.

== All time statistics ==
=== By competition ===
Competition	P	W	D	L	GF	GA	GD
UEFA Europa League / UEFA Cup	14	6	3	5	21	17	+ 4
Total	14	6	3	5	21	17	+ 4

=== By season ===
Season	Round	Country	Club	Home	Away	Aggregate
1987–88	First round	Cyprus	EPA Larnaca FC	3 – 0	1 – 0	4 – 0
1987–88	Second round	Soviet Union	FC Dinamo Tbilisi	1 – 2	0 – 0	1 – 2
1988–89	First round	Malta	Sliema Wanderers F.C.	6 – 1	2 – 0	8 – 1
1988–89	Second round	Soviet Union	FC Dinamo Minsk	1 – 0	1 – 2	(a) 2 – 2
1988–89	Third round	Finland	Turun Palloseura	1 – 0	2 – 3	(a) 3 – 3
1988–89	Quarter-finals	East Germany	Dynamo Dresden	1 – 1	0 – 4	1 – 5
1989–90	First round	Spain	Valencia CF	1 – 1	1 – 3	2 – 4

=== By country ===
Country	Club	P	W	D	L	GF	GA	GD
Soviet Union	FC Dinamo Minsk	2	1	0	1	2	2	0
Subtotal		2	1	0	1	2	2	0
Cyprus	EPA Larnaca FC	2	2	0	0	4	0	+ 4
Subtotal		2	2	0	0	4	0	+ 4
Finland	Turun Palloseura	2	1	0	1	3	3	0
Subtotal		2	1	0	1	3	3	0
Soviet Union	FC Dinamo Tbilisi	2	0	1	1	1	2	– 1
Subtotal		2	0	1	1	1	2	– 1
East Germany	Dynamo Dresden	2	0	1	1	1	5	– 4
Subtotal		2	0	1	1	1	5	– 4
Malta	Sliema Wanderers F.C.	2	2	0	0	8	1	+ 7
Subtotal		2	2	0	0	8	1	+ 7
Spain	Valencia CF	2	0	1	1	2	4	– 2
Subtotal		2	0	1	1	2	4	– 2
Total		14	6	3	5	21	17	+ 4
