= 1951–52 Cypriot First Division =

Cypriot First Division
- Season: 1951–52

The 1951–52 Cypriot First Division was the 15th season of the Cypriot top-level football league.

== Overview ==
It was contested by 8 teams, and APOEL F.C. won the championship.

== League standings ==
Pos	Team	Pld	W	D	L	GF	GA	GD	Pts
1	APOEL F.C. (C)	14	10	2	2	48	23	+25	22
2	EPA Larnaca FC	14	7	3	4	32	23	+9	17
3	Çetinkaya Türk S.K.	14	8	1	5	31	25	+6	17
4	Pezoporikos Larnaca	14	7	2	5	29	27	+2	16
5	AEL Limassol	14	5	5	4	34	27	+7	15
6	Anorthosis Famagusta FC	14	3	3	8	20	32	−12	9
7	AYMA	14	3	2	9	21	35	−14	8
8	Olympiakos Nicosia	14	3	2	9	25	48	−23	8

(C) Champions

== Results ==
Home \ Away	AEL	ANR	APN	AYM	EPA	OLY	POL	ÇET
AEL		2–1	0–3	4–1	1–1	10–1	3–3	1–5
Anorthosis	1–1		4–6	1–1	1–0	1–1	1–2	1–3
APOEL	4–1	2–3		5–0	1–1	5–2	5–2	2–2
AYMA	1–2	3–1	1–4		4–2	1–1	0–1	0–1
EPA	2–2	3–1	3–2	4–1		5–3	2–1	3–1
Olympiakos	2–6	2–3	2–4	5–2	1–0		1–2	1–3
Pezoporikos	0–0	5–1	1–3	2–0	1–4	5–1		3–1
Çetinkaya	2–1	1–0	1–2	2–6	3–2	1–2	5–1	

Legend: Blue = home team win; Yellow = draw; Red = away team win.
