= 1966–67 Cypriot Cup =

Tournament details
- Country: Cyprus
- Dates: 11 June 1967-2 July 1967
- Teams: 16

Final positions
- Champions: Apollon (2nd title)
- Runners-up: Alki

The 1966–67 Cypriot Cup was the 25th edition of the Cypriot Cup. A total of 16 clubs entered the competition. It began with the first round on 11 June 1967 and concluded on 2 July 1967 with the final which was held at GSP Stadium (1902). Apollon won their 2nd Cypriot Cup trophy after beating Alki 1–0 in the final.

Cypriot Cup 1966–67 Winners
Apollon
2nd title

== Sources ==
- "1966/67 Cyprus Cup". RSSSF. 2017-08-24.

== See also ==
- Cypriot Cup
- 1966–67 Cypriot First Division
