= 1949–50 Cypriot First Division =

Cypriot First Division
- Season: 1949–50

The 1949–50 Cypriot First Division was the 13th season of the Cypriot top-level football league.

== Overview ==
It was contested by 8 teams, and Anorthosis Famagusta FC won the championship.

== League standings ==
Pos	Team	Pld	W	D	L	GF	GA	GD	Pts
1	Anorthosis Famagusta FC (C)	14	11	1	2	51	23	+28	23
2	EPA Larnaca FC	14	10	2	2	41	23	+18	22
3	APOEL F.C.	14	8	1	5	38	21	+17	17
4	AEL Limassol	14	6	3	5	38	24	+14	15
5	Pezoporikos Larnaca	14	7	1	6	38	37	+1	15
6	Çetinkaya Türk S.K.	14	4	3	7	38	41	−3	11
7	Olympiakos Nicosia	14	1	4	9	22	46	−24	6
8	AYMA	14	1	1	12	19	70	−51	3

(C) Champions

== Results ==
Home \ Away	AEL	ANR	APN	AYM	EPA	OLY	POL	ÇET
AEL		5–2	2–3	8–1	2–3	5–2	1–1	1–1
Anorthosis	1–0		2–0	10–2	5–3	4–2	2–1	4–2
APOEL	1–2	2–4		8–0	1–2	4–0	3–2	4–2
AYMA	1–3	0–5	0–3		3–4	0–0	1–4	1–3
EPA	3–2	2–1	1–1	3–1		5–0	3–4	6–2
Olympiakos	1–1	1–5	1–4	2–4	1–1		7–2	2–2
Pezoporikos	1–5	0–3	3–1	4–2	0–4	5–2		5–2
Çetinkaya	3–1	3–3	0–3	13–3	0–1	4–1	1–6	

Legend: Blue = home team win; Yellow = draw; Red = away team win.

== Bibliography ==
- Cyprus - List of final tables (RSSSF)
