= 1965–66 Cypriot Cup =

Tournament details
- Country: Cyprus
- Dates: 4 June 1966-29 June 1966
- Teams: 13

Final positions
- Champions: Apollon (1st title)
- Runners-up: Nea Salamis

The 1965–66 Cypriot Cup was the 24th edition of the Cypriot Cup. A total of 13 clubs entered the competition. It began with the first round on 4 June 1966 and concluded on 29 June 1966 with the final which was held at GSP Stadium (1902). Apollon won their 1st Cypriot Cup trophy after beating Nea Salamis 4–2 in the final.

Cypriot Cup 1965–66 Winners
Apollon
1st title

== Sources ==
- "1965/66 Cyprus Cup". RSSSF. 2017-08-24.

== See also ==
- Cypriot Cup
- 1965–66 Cypriot First Division
