= 1964–65 Cypriot Cup =

Tournament details
- Country: Cyprus
- Dates: 6 June 1965-4 July 1965
- Teams: 12

Final positions
- Champions: Omonia (1st title)
- Runners-up: Apollon

The 1964–65 Cypriot Cup was the 23rd edition of the Cypriot Cup. A total of 12 clubs entered the competition. It began with the first round on 6 June 1965 and concluded on 4 July 1965 with the final which was held at the Old GSP Stadium. Omonia won their 1st Cypriot Cup trophy after beating Apollon 5–1 in the final.

Cypriot Cup 1964–65 Winners
Omonia
1st title

== Sources ==
- "1964/65 Cyprus Cup". RSSSF. 2017-08-24.

== See also ==
- Cypriot Cup
- 1964–65 Cypriot First Division
