= 1968–69 Cypriot Cup =

Tournament details
- Country: Cyprus
- Teams: 16

Final positions
- Champions: APOEL (7th title)
- Runners-up: Omonoia

The 1968–69 Cypriot Cup was the 27th edition of the Cypriot Cup. A total of 16 clubs entered the competition. It began with the first round and concluded on 29 June 1969 with the final which was held at GSP Stadium (1902). APOEL won their 6th Cypriot Cup trophy after beating Omonoia 1–0 in the final.

Cypriot Cup 1968–69 Winners
APOEL
7th title

== Sources ==
- "1968/69 Cyprus Cup". RSSSF. 2017-08-24.

== See also ==
- Cypriot Cup
- 1968–69 Cypriot First Division
