= 1952–53 Cypriot First Division =

Cypriot First Division
- Season: 1952–53

The 1952–53 Cypriot First Division was the 16th season of the Cypriot top-level football league.

== Overview ==
It was contested by 8 teams, and AEL Limassol won the championship.

== League standings ==
Pos	Team	Pld	W	D	L	GF	GA	GD	Pts
1	AEL Limassol (C)	14	11	1	2	43	23	+20	23
2	Pezoporikos Larnaca	14	9	3	2	33	16	+17	21
3	APOEL F.C.	14	6	5	3	33	25	+8	17
4	Çetinkaya Türk S.K.	14	6	3	5	27	23	+4	15
5	Anorthosis Famagusta FC	14	4	4	6	30	31	−1	12
6	EPA Larnaca FC	14	5	2	7	21	25	−4	12
7	Olympiakos Nicosia	14	3	2	9	20	40	−20	8
8	AYMA	14	0	4	10	20	44	−24	4

(C) Champions

== Results ==
Home \ Away	AEL	ANR	APN	AYM	EPA	OLY	POL	ÇET
AEL		3–2	3–1	4–1	1–0	8–1	3–2	4–1
Anorthosis	1–3		1–1	5–1	1–2	4–1	1–1	1–0
APOEL	2–1	6–3		2–2	3–0	7–3	0–0	3–3
AYMA	2–3	2–2	2–4		2–2	3–7	2–4	0–2
EPA	2–2	1–4	3–1	2–1		5–0	1–2	0–1
Olympiakos	1–2	1–1	1–0	0–0	1–2		1–2	2–1
Pezoporikos	2–1	6–2	3–0	3–0	3–1	2–0		2–2
Çetinkaya	3–4	3–2	1–1	4–2	3–0	3–1	0–1	

Legend: Blue = home team win; Yellow = draw; Red = away team win.
