= 1963–64 Cypriot Cup =

Tournament details
- Country: Cyprus
- Dates: 10 June 1964-5 July 1964
- Teams: 7

Final positions
- Champions: Anorthosis (4th title)
- Runners-up: APOEL

The 1963–64 Cypriot Cup was the 22nd edition of the Cypriot Cup. A total of 7 clubs entered the competition. It began with the first round on 10 June 1964 and concluded on 5 July 1964 with the final which was held at GSP Stadium (1902). Anorthosis won their 1st Cypriot Cup trophy after beating APOEL 3–0 in the final.

Cypriot Cup 1963–64 Winners
Anorthosis
4th title

== Sources ==
- "1963/64 Cyprus Cup". RSSSF. 2017-08-24.

== See also ==
- Cypriot Cup
- 1963–64 Cypriot First Division
