= 1967–68 Cypriot Cup =

Tournament details
- Country: Cyprus
- Dates: 8 June 1968-7 July 1968
- Teams: 21

Final positions
- Champions: APOEL (6th title)
- Runners-up: EPA

The 1967–68 Cypriot Cup was the 26th edition of the Cypriot Cup. A total of 21 clubs entered the competition. It began with the first round on 8 June 1968 and concluded on 7 July 1968 with the final which was held at GSP Stadium (1902). APOEL won their 6th Cypriot Cup trophy after beating EPA 2–1 in the final.

Cypriot Cup 1967–68 Winners
APOEL
6th title

== Sources ==
- "1967/68 Cyprus Cup". RSSSF. 2017-08-24.

== See also ==
- Cypriot Cup
- 1967–68 Cypriot First Division
