= 1969–70 Cypriot Cup =

Tournament details
- Country: Cyprus
- Dates: 4 April 1970 – 3 May 1970
- Teams: 16

Final positions
- Champions: Pezoporikos Larnaca (1st title)
- Runners-up: Alki Larnaca

The 1969–70 Cypriot Cup was the 28th edition of the Cypriot Cup. A total of 16 clubs entered the competition. It began on 4 April 1970 with the first round and concluded on 3 May 1970 with the final which was held at GSP Stadium (1902). Pezoporikos Larnaca won their 1st Cypriot Cup trophy after beating ]Alki Larnaca 2–1 in the final.

Cypriot Cup 1969–70 Winners
Pezoporikos Larnaca
1st title

== Sources ==
- "1969/70 Cyprus Cup". RSSSF. 2017-08-24.

== See also ==
- Cypriot Cup
- 1969–70 Cypriot First Division
