= 1940–41 Cypriot First Division =

Cypriot First Division
- Season: 1940–41

The 1940–41 Cypriot First Division was the 7th season of the Cypriot top-level football league.

== Overview ==
It was contested by 5 teams, and AEL Limassol won the championship.

== League standings ==
Pos	Team	Pld	W	D	L	GF	GA	GD	Pts	Qualification
1	AEL Limassol (C)	7	6	0	1	43	11	+32	12	Championship Play-off as level on points
2	APOEL F.C.	7	6	0	1	41	8	+33	12	Championship Play-off as level on points
3	EPA Larnaca FC	7	2	0	5	17	26	−9	4	
4	Olympiakos Nicosia	7	2	0	5	16	50	−34	4	
5	Lefkoşa Türk Spor Kulübü	4	0	0	4	4	26	−22	0	

(C) Champions

== Results ==
Home \ Away	AEL	APN	EPA	OLY	LTS
AEL		2–1	2–1	12–4	13–0
APOEL	2–0		10–0	10–0	–
EPA	1–4	2–5		7–1	4–1
Olympiakos	2–8	1–8	3–2		–
LTSK	–	0–5	–	3–4	

Legend: Blue = home team win; Yellow = draw; Red = away team win.

== Championship play-off ==
- APOEL F.C. v AEL Limassol 1-2
- AEL Limassol v APOEL F.C. 3-1
