= 1946–47 Cypriot First Division =

Cypriot First Division
- Season: 1946–47

The 1946–47 Cypriot First Division was the 10th season of the Cypriot top-level football league.

== Overview ==
It was contested by 7 teams, and APOEL F.C. won the championship.

== League standings ==
Pos	Team	Pld	W	D	L	GF	GA	GD	Pts
1	APOEL F.C. (C)	12	12	0	0	44	9	+35	24
2	EPA Larnaca FC	12	9	0	3	29	13	+16	18
3	Pezoporikos Larnaca	12	5	1	6	25	27	−2	11
4	AEL Limassol	12	5	0	7	21	25	−4	10
5	Lefkoşa Türk Spor Kulübü	12	4	1	7	20	30	−10	9
6	Anorthosis Famagusta FC	12	4	0	8	26	37	−11	8
7	Olympiakos Nicosia	12	2	0	10	19	43	−24	4

(C) Champions

== Results ==
Home \ Away	AEL	ANR	APN	EPA	OLY	POL	LTS
AEL		3–4	0–5	1–2	3–0	3–2	2–0
Anorthosis	5–4		0–3	2–4	2–4	0–2	4–1
APOEL	2–0	4–2		1–0	3–2	6–0	3–1
EPA	2–0	2–0	0–1		3–1	4–2	4–2
Olympiakos	1–3	6–3	0–10	1–4		1–3	1–2
Pezoporikos	2–0	2–4	1–2	2–1	4–0		2–3
LTSK	0–2	2–0	3–4	0–3	3–2	3–3	

Legend: Blue = home team win; Yellow = draw; Red = away team win.
