= 1945–46 Cypriot First Division =

Cypriot First Division
- Season: 1945–46

The 1945–46 Cypriot First Division was the 9th season of the Cypriot top-level football league.

== Overview ==
It was contested by 6 teams, and EPA Larnaca FC won the championship.

== League standings ==
Pos	Team	Pld	W	D	L	GF	GA	GD	Pts
1	EPA Larnaca FC (C)	10	8	1	1	34	14	+20	17
2	APOEL F.C.	10	7	1	2	37	12	+25	15
3	Pezoporikos Larnaca	10	3	3	4	20	23	−3	9
4	AEL Limassol	10	3	2	5	16	22	−6	8
5	Lefkoşa Türk Spor Kulübü	10	3	0	7	17	35	−18	6
6	Olympiakos Nicosia	10	1	3	6	12	30	−18	5

(C) Champions

== Results ==
Home \ Away	AEL	APN	EPA	OLY	POL	LTS
AEL		2–1	1–2	1–1	3–1	4–0
APOEL	2–0		3–1	4–0	1–1	12–1
EPA	5–1	3–2		3–1	1–1	4–1
Olympiakos	2–2	3–5	0–6		2–2	1–0
Pezoporikos	6–1	1–3	1–5	3–1		4–2
LTSK	2–1	0–4	3–4	4–1	4–0	

Legend: Blue = home team win; Yellow = draw; Red = away team win.
