= 1939–40 Cypriot First Division =

Cypriot First Division
- Season: 1939–40

The 1939–40 Cypriot First Division was the 6th season of the Cypriot top-level football league.

== Overview ==
It was contested by 6 teams, and APOEL F.C. won the championship.

== League standings ==
Pos	Team	Pld	W	D	L	GF	GA	GD	Pts
1	APOEL F.C. (C)	10	7	2	1	30	10	+20	16
2	Pezoporikos Larnaca	10	7	0	3	37	21	+16	14
3	EPA Larnaca FC	10	4	3	3	24	22	+2	11
4	AEL Limassol	10	4	0	6	21	16	+5	8
5	Lefkoşa Türk Spor Kulübü	9	3	1	5	15	27	−12	7
6	Olympiakos Nicosia	9	1	0	8	7	38	−31	2

(C) Champions

== Results ==
Home \ Away	AEL	APN	EPA	OLY	POL	LTS
AEL		1–2	2–3	4–0	5–2	3–0
APOEL	3–1		1–1	5–0	6–1	4–1
EPA	3–2	1–1		3–2	2–4	3–3
Olympiakos	2–1	1–4	1–4		0–3	0–2
Pezoporikos	0–2	2–1	2–1	12–1		9–2
LTSK	1–0	1–3	4–3	–	1–2	

Legend: Blue = home team win; Yellow = draw; Red = away team win.
