= 1938–39 Cypriot First Division =

Cypriot First Division
- Season: 1938–39

The 1938–39 Cypriot First Division was the 5th season of the Cypriot top-level football league.

== Overview ==
It was contested by 7 teams, and APOEL F.C. won the championship.

== League standings ==
Pos	Team	Pld	W	D	L	GF	GA	GD	Pts
1	APOEL F.C. (C)	11	9	2	0	36	11	+25	20
2	EPA Larnaca FC	11	9	0	2	33	9	+24	18
3	AEL Limassol	10	6	2	2	51	15	+36	14
4	Lefkoşa Türk Spor Kulübü	9	2	1	6	12	18	−6	5
5	Pezoporikos Larnaca	8	2	1	5	12	16	−4	5
6	Olympiakos Nicosia	9	2	0	7	13	42	−29	4
7	Aris Limassol F.C.	8	0	0	8	9	55	−46	0

(C) Champions

== Results ==
Home \ Away	AEL	APN	ARS	EPA	OLY	POL	LTS
AEL		2–2	24–1	1–2	–	–	4–0
APOEL	2–2		–	1–0	5–0	2–0	2–1
Aris	0–4	2–4		0–7	3–4	–	0–5
EPA	2–0	1–2	–		6–1	3–2	2–1
Olympiakos	3–8	1–9	4–3	0–5		1–2	0–1
Pezoporikos	3–5	0–1	3–0	1–3	–		1–1
LTSK	0–1	3–6	–	0–2	–	–	

Legend: Blue = home team win; Yellow = draw; Red = away team win.
