= 1947–48 Cypriot First Division =

Cypriot First Division
- Season: 1947–48

The 1947–48 Cypriot First Division was the 11th season of the Cypriot top-level football league.

== Overview ==
It was contested by 5 teams, and APOEL F.C. won the championship.

== League standings ==
Pos	Team	Pld	W	D	L	GF	GA	GD	Pts
1	APOEL F.C. (C)	8	7	1	0	37	7	+30	15
2	AEL Limassol	8	5	1	2	20	10	+10	11
3	Olympiakos Nicosia	8	4	0	4	25	23	+2	8
4	AYMA	8	2	1	5	12	26	−14	5
5	Lefkoşa Türk Spor Kulübü	8	0	1	7	6	36	−30	1

(C) Champions

== Results ==
Home \ Away	AEL	APN	AYM	OLY	LTS
AEL		1–2	3–0	4–1	4–2
APOEL	2–2		6–0	6–1	7–0
AYMA	2–4	1–5		3–6	2–2
Olympiakos	1–0	1–5	1–3		11–0
LTSK	0–2	1–4	0–2	1–4	

Legend: Blue = home team win; Yellow = draw; Red = away team win.
