= 1944–45 Cypriot First Division =

Cypriot First Division
- Season: 1944–45

The 1944–45 Cypriot First Division was the 8th season of the Cypriot top-level football league.

== Overview ==
It was contested by 6 teams, and EPA Larnaca FC won the championship.

== League standings ==
Pos	Team	Pld	W	D	L	GF	GA	GD	Pts	Qualification
1	EPA Larnaca FC (C)	10	8	1	1	50	19	+31	17	Championship Play-off as level on points
2	APOEL F.C.	10	8	1	1	40	13	+27	17	Championship Play-off as level on points
3	AEL Limassol	10	6	1	3	31	22	+9	13	
4	Pezoporikos Larnaca	10	2	2	6	22	34	−12	6	
5	Olympiakos Nicosia	10	2	2	6	19	37	−18	6	
6	Lefkoşa Türk Spor Kulübü	10	0	1	9	12	49	−37	1	

(C) Champions

== Results ==
Home \ Away	AEL	APN	EPA	OLY	POL	LTS
AEL		2–1	2–3	7–3	3–2	4–1
APOEL	3–1		4–2	6–0	5–1	2–0
EPA	5–1	4–4		6–1	11–2	4–1
Olympiakos	0–3	3–5	1–6		1–1	1–1
Pezoporikos	3–3	1–2	1–3	1–4		5–1
LTSK	1–5	2–9	2–6	2–8	1–5	

Legend: Blue = home team win; Yellow = draw; Red = away team win.

== Championship play-off ==
- APOEL F.C. v EPA Larnaca FC 0-0
- EPA Larnaca FC v APOEL F.C. 3-1
