= Apollon Limassol FC =

Cypriot sports club

Apollon Limassol
- Full name: Απόλλων Λεμεσού; Apollon Limassol FC
- Nicknames: Thrylos (Legend); Kyanolefki (The Blue and white); O Fygas (The Fugitive)
- Founded: 14 April 1954; 72 years ago
- Ground: Alphamega Stadium
- Capacity: 10,830
- Owner: Apollon Football (Public) Ltd
- President: Nicos Kirzis
- Manager: Hernán Losada
- League: First Division
- 2025–26: First Division, 3rd of 14
- Website: apollon.com.cy
Home colours	Away colours	Third colours

Apollon Limassol FC (Greek: Απόλλων Λεμεσού, Apollon Lemesou) is a Cypriot sports club, based in Limassol. It has football, basketball and volleyball teams. Founded in 1954, Apollon FC currently plays in the Cypriot First Division and has won the championship title four times, the cup nine times and the Super Cup four times.

== History ==
At the end of 1953, a team of young men placed as a dream and objective, the foundation of an association with national and athletic aims based on promoting the education and social skills of its young members. On 14 April 1954, the general assembly of these members with leader Mr Christakis Pavlides proposes the foundation of an athletic association called "APOLLON LIMASSOL". The assembly approved the proposal and thus from that date "APOLLON was born". The first administrative council of the team included: Charalambos Lymbourides (Secretary), Andreas Psyllides (Cashier), Antonakis Fourlas (Adviser), Melis Charalampous (Adviser), Andreas Theoharous (Adviser) Andreas Aggelopoulos (Adviser) and Kostas Panayiotou (Adviser).

In its first year, Apollon had eight defeats in eight matches in the second division. Just before the next season (1956–57), Apollon won the regional group in the second division and subsequently the play-offs and then was promoted to the first division.

This took place in 1957 and ever since Apollon has been competing in the first division. Through its history, Apollon won four Championships (1991, 1994, 2006, 2022), nine Cups (1966, 1967, 1986, 1992, 2001, 2010, 2013, 2016, 2017), three Super Cup (2006, 2016, 2017) and also had some very successful participation in European competitions, winning several important games.

=== 1954–1955: early years ===
In its first year, Apollon suffered eight defeats in eight matches in the second division. Just before the next season (1956–57), Apollon won the regional group in the second division and subsequently the play-offs and then was promoted to the first division. This took place in 1957 and ever since Apollon has been competing in the first division. Things were not easy however for the newly promoted club. Apollon couldn't reach a satisfactory position in the rankings and was struggling in the middle of the table for many years. But in the mid-60's things changed.

=== 1964–1967: the first distinctions ===
In 1965 Apollon reached the Cup Final. However, Omonia won the title with a score of 5–1. A year later, Apollon was in the Final again, and won the Cup by defeating Nea Salamina with the score of 4–2 (Scorers: Panikos Yiolitis, Andros Konstantinou, Panikkos Krystallis, Antonis Panayides), and triumphantly took the trophy to Limassol. Apollon managed to maintain its Cup title in 1967, by beating Alki 1–0 thanks to the goal of Antonis Panayides. After celebrating these titles, Apollon had to wait another 15 years to start making history once again.

=== 1981–1987: back to the Cup final after 20 fallow years ===
In the football season 1981–82 Apollon managed to reach once again the Cup final however in double games Omonia won the Cup. In the 1985–86 season, after 20 years of "drought" Apollon won once again the Cup in Tsirion Stadium, overcoming APOEL with a score of 2–0. Scores were Kenny and Sokratous.

=== 1990–1999: 10 years of glory ===
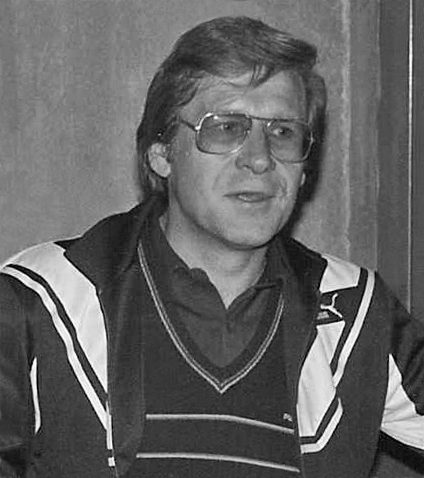
Diethelm Ferner

The appointment of German coach Diethelm Ferner marked the beginning of one of the most successful periods in Apollon's history. Under his management, the club won its first Cypriot First Division title in the 1990–91 season. Ferner combined experienced players with emerging talent, helping to establish a competitive squad.

Apollon followed its league success by winning the Cypriot Cup in the 1991–92 season, defeating Omonia in the final through a goal by Evgenio Ptak. Although the club failed to retain either domestic title in 1992–93, it regained the league championship in 1993–94 after a closely contested title race with Anorthosis that was decided on the final day of the season.

During the same period, Apollon also reached the Cypriot Cup finals in 1994–95 and 1997–98, losing to APOEL and Anorthosis, respectively.

=== 2000–2010: 1 championship, 2 cups and 1 super cup ===
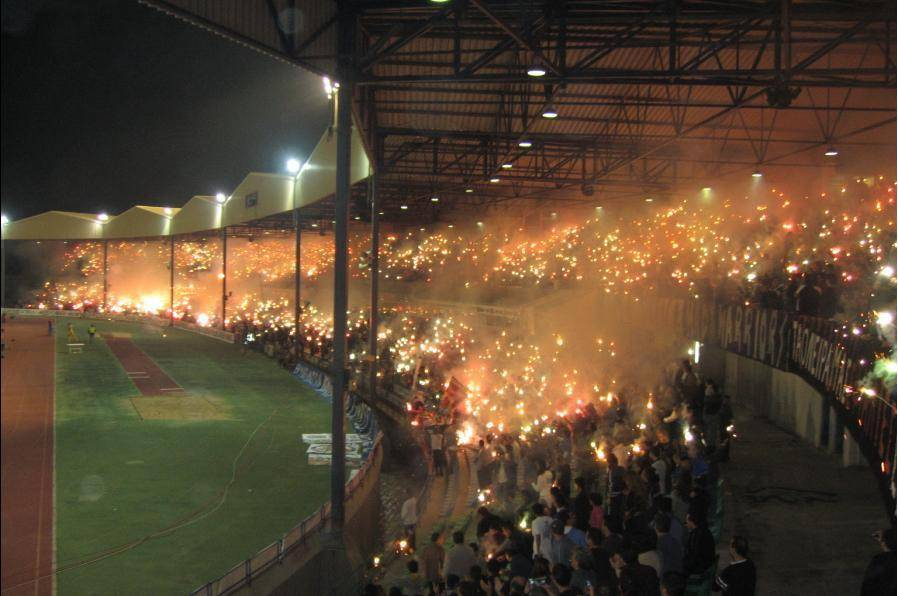
Apollon supporters during a match in 2006

In the 2000–01 season Apollon won the cup against Nea Salamis Famagusta in the GSP stadium, with final score 1–0. Scorer was the unforgettable Viktor Zubarev.

In the middle of the football season (2004–05) and after enough failed attempts for glory after the final of 2001, German manager Bernd Stange took the responsibility, accomplishing late but regularly he brought back the lost glamour of the team. In the season, 2005–06 Apollon won the league title undefeated and earned a club record of 64 points. Apollon had 19 wins and 7 draws in 26 matches and this went down in Cypriot Football history, due to fact that it was the fourth team in the Cyprus Championship that won the title unbeaten (*Apollon was the only undefeated team in Europe, running an unbeaten streak since 12 March 2005 (30 games). The next year Apollon won for the first time in his history the Super Cup beating APOEL 1–3 at home.

In 2010 Apollon won the Cup after 9 years (2001 Final Cup), beating APOEL Nicosia in GSZ Stadium. The final score was 2–1.

=== 2010–11: cup finalists ===
The following year (2011), Apollon reached the final of the Cypriot Cup for the second consecutive year, but lost to Omonia on penalties, after a 1–1 draw following extra time

=== 2012–13: Cypriot Cup winners ===
On 22 May 2013, Apollon won the Cup after three years (last Cup won in 2010). Apollon won in the final by beating 1–2 AEL Limassol at Tsirion Stadium in extra time, achieving the club's 7th Cypriot Cup title. Apollon fans are very demanding and loyal to the Club and after 3 years they celebrated the Cup by singing, drinking, celebrating the whole week.

=== 2013–14: gold history and big dreams ===
Apollon Limassol skipper Giorgos Merkis implored his team-mates not to rest on their laurels after securing a famous 2–0 victory against OGC Nice in the first leg of their 2013–14 UEFA Europa League play-off. Christakis Christoforou's men were billed as overwhelming underdogs going into the tie, but a second-half double from Argentinian forward Gaston Sangoy has put them in a commanding position ahead of the 29 August decider at Stade Municipal du Ray. The next week Apollon travelled to Nice and the dream came true. Apollon lost 1–0 from OGC-Nice but qualified at the group stage of Europa League for the first time in the team's history. In the group stage Apollon will play with: Lazio, Trabzonspor and Legia Warsaw. At the debut match at GSP stadium in Nicosia in the group stage of Europa League Apollon Limassol defeated by Trabzonspor 1–2 and the scorer was the team's star Gaston Sangoy. On 26 September Apollon became the first Cypriot side to win a game in Poland on matchday two, ending a seven-game losing streak away from home in Europe to beat Legia Warsaw 1–0. Scorer against Polish side was again Gaston Sangoy. It is the first away victory for a Cypriot side in a UEFA club competition group stage in their last 16 attempts. In the third match on 24 October, Apollon claimed a 0–0 draw against Serie A side Lazio in Nicosia to keep alive their chances of qualifying from UEFA Europa League Group J.

=== 2014–15: Europa league gold dreams ===
After finishing 3rd in the 2013–14 Cypriot First Division, Apollon entered the 2014–15 UEFA Europa League play-off round, where they faced Russian Premier League club Lokomotiv Moscow. The first leg was held in Cyprus and ended with a 1–1 draw. The second leg, held in Moscow, ended with a 4–1 win to the guests and brought Apollon to the group stage of the competition. Apollon became the first team in Cyprus to qualify for a European competition by winning in an away game in the play-off round for two consecutive years as well as joining UEFA Europa League for two consecutive seasons.

Apollon, having three points, were out of the competition after losing to FC Zürich in a replay match.

=== 2015–20: striving for success ===
In the period between 2015 and 2020, the team had some highs and lows, as they fought for supremacy in the Cypriot First Division and tried to make a mark in the UEFA Europa League.

During the 2015–2016 season, the team's league performance was relatively disappointing as Apollon finished in the 5th place. However they were able to make up for this by having a strong run in the Cypriot Cup. The team managed to reach the final. Apollon faced off against Omonia in a closely contested match. The game was tied 1-1 and Apollon was able to score the winning goal in the 72nd minute with a header of Angelis Angeli.

Apollon's next season started poorly after being eliminated from the 2016–17 UEFA Europa League third qualifying round by Grasshopper Club Zürich and a series of bad results in the league. Manager Pedro Emanuel was eventually sacked. Former goalkeeper of the team Sofronis Avgousti was then appointed as the caretaker manager for the remaining of the season. The team then went on to achieve an incredible 10 games winning streak in both league and cup. Albeit the hard-fought efforts to win the championship, the team was faced with the complication of the not so good start to the season, which made their task all the more difficult. Despite the fact that Apollon could not manage to win the title, the team reached the 2016–17 Cypriot Cup final against APOEL and won it for a second year in a row, while also playing with 10 men. This remarkable effort by the team earned Sofronis Avgousti the permanent manager position at the club.

The 2017–18 Cypriot First Division season was spectacular for the team, even though the team could not win any title. Apollon finished in 2nd place, behind only the dominant APOEL, who won the league for the sixth consecutive season. Apollon Limassol had a strong campaign, winning 25 of their 36 matches and earning a record-breaking total (for the team) 82 points. The team's success was largely due to their strong attacking play, as they scored 90 goals throughout the season. The top scorer was Emilio Zelaya, who found the back of the net 17 times in the league. Anton Maglica and Fotis Papoulis also had a great contribution to Apollon's attacking play after scoring 16 and 15 goals respectively. The fact that five players of Apollon (João Pedro, Valentin Roberge, Esteban Sachetti, Alef, Fotis Papoulis) were voted for the Best 11 of the season is a strong statement of the team's overall performance. Manager Sofronis Avgousti was also voted as the Manager of the Season. This particular 2017–2018 team is widely regarded as one of the best of all time in the club's history, as well as Cyprus football in general. In addition to their strong performance in the league, Apollon also had a successful run in the 2017–18 UEFA Europa League. The team started their campaign in the second qualifying round and managed to qualify for the group stage for the 3rd time in the club's history. In the group stage, Apollon Limassol faced off against Olympique Lyonnais, Atalanta B.C. and Everton F.C. but failed to progress to the knockout stage.

In the following seasons, the team continued to fight and compete for silverware while also playing in Europe, but had mixed fortunes.

In 2018–2019 season Apollon qualified once again for the 2018–19 UEFA Europa League group stage after surprisingly knocking out FC Basel in the play-off round. In the group stage, they were drawn in a tough group alongside S.S. Lazio, Eintracht Frankfurt, and Olympique de Marseille. Despite a strong performance, Apollon Limassol ultimately finished in third place in the group, missing out on qualification for the knockout stages of the competition. Nonetheless, their run was widely praised, as they put in a series of impressive performances against some of the top teams in Europe.

The 2020–21 Cypriot First Division season was a rollercoaster for Apollon. After a slow start to the season, the team gradually picked up momentum and went on an impressive winning streak. They were neck-and-neck with Omonia for the top spot in the league throughout the season. However, in the second to last game of the season, Apollon suffered a heartbreaking 2–2 draw to Olympiakos Nicosia, while Omonia won their game against AEK Larnaca and as a result, Omonia were crowned champions. It was a bitter pill to swallow for Apollon Limassol, who had come so close to winning their first league title since the 2005–06 Cypriot First Division season.

=== 2021–22: champions again ===
The 2021–22 Cypriot First Division season was a historic one for Apollon Limassol, as they won their first Cypriot First Division title in 16 years and 4th in total under the guidance of coach Alexander Zorniger. The team got off to a strong start to the season, winning their first four games and establishing themselves as early contenders for the title. As the season progressed, Apollon Limassol continued to put in strong performances, and soon found themselves to the top of the table. One of the defining moments of the season came on 8 May 2022, 3 games before the end of the championship, when Apollon faced off against APOEL in a crucial top-of-the-table clash. Apollon came into this game with a 9-game winless streak which helped APOEL catch up, making this game the most crucial of the season. The game was closely contested, but Apollon Limassol emerged as 3–2 winners thanks to goals from Ioannis Pittas, Charalampos Mavrias and Rangelo Janga. This victory ended Apollon's winless streak and gave the team a four-point lead at the top of the table, and they never looked back from there. As the season drew to a close, Apollon eventually clinched the league title with one game to spare after winning 1–4 against Aris Limassol. After a long 16-year wait, Apollon Limassol's fans were understandably overjoyed at their team's Cypriot First Division title win. Fans took over the streets to celebrate, waving flags, setting off flares, and singing and dancing in celebration of their team's success. The team's victory parade through Anexartisias Street of Limassol was a highlight of the celebrations, with thousands of fans lining the route to cheer on their heroes. The players were greeted with loud cheers and applause as they made their way through the street, holding aloft the championship trophy and displaying their winners' medals. Fans also gathered at Enaerios street to celebrate, with many lighting flares and singing songs into the early hours of the morning.

== Crest and colours ==
The team' s emblem represents the olympian God Apollo from the Greek mythology. Apollo was considered the god of sun, poetry and music. The colours of the team are blue and white. They represent the colours of the Greek flag as the creation of the team was well connected with the struggles of Cypriot people for unification with Greece. The away colours are white and the home kit blue.

== Other teams ==
=== Basketball team ===
The Basketball team of Apollon was founded in 1967 and is one of the founding members of Cyprus Basketball Federation. From then the team participated regularly in the championship of 1st Division. The unique titles in the history of department, are two cups in 2002 and 2014 and a Super Cup in 2004. While it finished many times in second places.

=== Volleyball team ===
A Founding member of the Cyprus Volleyball Federation, the women's team participated in several Championship finals (1999, 2001, 2003, 2010, 2011, 2012, 2013) and in eight Cup finals (1992, 1997, 1998, 2000, 2003, 2011, 2012, 2013) . Apollon won: 6 National Championships (2011, 2014, 2015, 2016, 2017,2022), 5 National Cups (2014– AEK Larnaca 3–0, 2015– AEK Larnaca 3–0, 2016– AEL Limassol 3–0, 2017-Anorthosis Famagusta 3–1,2021-Olympiada Neapolis 3–0), 6 Super Cups (2003– AEL 3–0, 2013– Anorthosis Famagusta 3–0, 2014– AEK Larnaca 3–0, 2015– AEK Larnaca 3–2, 2016– AEL 3–2, 2021-olympiada Neapolis 3–2)

=== Women's football team ===
The women's team has won the Cypriot First Division as well as the Cypriot Women's Cup four consecutive times from 2009 to 2012 and from 2014 to 2017. The team also reached the UEFA Women's Champions League round of 32 in 2010,2011,2012,2013,2014 and 2016.

On 15 October 2013, Apollon Limassol girls win the first Super Cup Beating Anorthosis 3–0 in the final, Anorthosis had won the double the previous year and played Apollon Limassol in the cup final.

== Stadium ==
Football

The team's stadium was the 13,331 seater Tsirio Stadium until 2022. It was also the home ground of AEL Limassol and Aris Limassol. The stadium was built in 1975.

The construction of the Alphamega Stadium replaced Tsirio Stadium as the home ground of Apollon. The capacity of the new stadium is 10,700 seats.

Basketball/Volleyball

Apollon has its own indoor hall, the PrimeTel Apollon Stadium, with a capacity of 2,800 seats.

== Supporters ==
In 1981, the organised portion of the supporters of the club, elected council members and began organising themselves, in a tiny room of the clubhouse (where it now houses the offices of the football Company) the membership fee was then 10 Cypriot cents. Later on in 1982 after the positive response in enlisting new members of the fan club, the cost of registration was increased to 2 Cyprus pounds. At a time when no other team had yet an organised group of fans on the island, a new fan club was registered. The registration was triggered after a game in Paphos where the followers of Apollon made an organised excursion something that had not been done previously. On their return, everyone was happy with the experience, that they agreed to set up formally and officially the Sy.Fi Association (Apollon Limassol)-Apollon Limassol Fan club. In 1982 Costas Katafygiotis was elected first president of the Apollon Sy.Fi in September 1982. The next year the fan club worked in an official manner. Chaired by Dino it opened in parallel a souvenir shop on the street and gained its Independence from the football club and became a housing association for the fans. Later, the Apollon Sy.Fi renamed itself to PA.SY.FI Apollon (Apollon Cyprus Association of Supporters) and much later PAN.SY.FI APOLLON (Pan Hellenic Supporters Association of Apollon) to show the bond of our association with Greece.

From 1996 onwards PAN.SY.FI became synonymous with GATE-1 a designation which originated from the entrance gate in the West Tsireio stadium stand, where members gather.

PAN.SY.FI Apollon Gate 1 is the name of the supporters fan club.

Apollon is amongst the most popular football teams in Cyprus. The fans are very demanding and loyal to the club. More than 14,000 Apollon fans traveled from Limassol for the 2001 Cup Final that took place in Nicosia (16,828 tickets). This number also beat the previous top record for a team traveling for an away game to Nicosia. Celebrations for winning the League championship for the 1993–94 season following the victory against Omonoia FC More than 20,000 fans overflowed the Stadium to see Apollon clinch the title in the final game of the season. Celebrations following the victory against Omonoia FC at the 1992 FA Cup Final in Tsirio, stadium. More than 20,000 fans attended the game.

== Players ==
=== Current squad ===
As of 18 August 2026

Note: Flags indicate national team as defined under FIFA eligibility rules; some limited exceptions apply. Players may hold more than one non-FIFA nationality.

No.	Pos.	Nation	Player
4	DF	AUT	Emanuel Aiwu
5	MF	CYP	Morgan Brown
6	DF	ENG	Connor Goldson
9	FW	SLO	Alen Ožbolt
10	FW	CPV	Garry Rodrigues
11	FW	CYP	Angelos Andreou
12	MF	BRA	Gustavo Assunção
14	DF	CYP	Giorgos Malekkides
19	DF	CYP	Nearchos Zinonos
20	MF	CYP	Danilo Špoljarić
22	GK	GER	Philipp Kühn
23	FW	ESP	Brandon Thomas
26	DF	CYP	Andreas Shikkis

No.	Pos.	Nation	Player
27	MF	FRA	Gaétan Weissbeck
29	FW	SWE	Joel Asoro
30	FW	ESP	Dani Escriche
31	GK	CYP	Konstantinos Stylianou
37	DF	CYP	Leonidas Konomis
38	DF	GRE	Konstantinos Balogiannis
41	GK	NED	Peter Leeuwenburgh
44	DF	CZE	Josef Kvída
76	DF	ANG	Bruno Gaspar
77	MF	AUT	Ivan Ljubić
89	FW	CYP	Robertos Rotis
99	FW	CAN	Iké Ugbo (on loan from Sheffield Wednesday)

=== Out on loan ===
Note: Flags indicate national team as defined under FIFA eligibility rules; some limited exceptions apply. Players may hold more than one non-FIFA nationality.

No.	Pos.	Nation	Player
—	DF	CYP	Ioannis Polyviou (at AEP Polemidion until 31 May 2027)
—	MF	CYP	Christos Charalambous (at AEP Polemidion until 31 May 2027)
—	FW	TUN	Ali Youssef (at Mjällby until 31 December 2026)

No.	Pos.	Nation	Player
—	FW	GHA	Clinton Duodu (at Sivasspor until 31 May 2027)
—	FW	CYP	Panayiotis Charalambous (at AEP Polemidion until 31 May 2027)
—	FW	CYP	Andreas Athanasiou (at Krasava ENY Ypsonas until 31 May 2027)

== Club officials ==
=== Board of directors ===
Position	Staff
President	(Cyprus) Nicos Kirzis
Vice-president	(Cyprus) Marinos Efstathiou
Vice-president	(Cyprus) Antonis Glykis
Vice-president	(Cyprus) Fanos Kinnis
Committee Member	(Cyprus) Charalambos Antoniou
Committee Member	(Cyprus) Panagiotis Georgakis
Committee Member	(Cyprus) Evros Evripidou
Committee Member	(Israel) Moshe (Hiko) Rajczyk
Committee Member	(Cyprus) Nicos Ioannou
Committee Member	(Cyprus) Socrates Ellinas
Committee Member	(Cyprus) Vassilios Demetriades
Committee Member	(Cyprus) Petros Demosthenous
Committee Member	(Cyprus) Giorgos Athinis

=== Staff ===
Position	Staff
Accounting Department	(Cyprus) Despoina Panayi
Press Officer	(Cyprus) Fanourios Constantinou
Social Media Manager	(Cyprus) Panicos Frangoudis
Press Office Department	(Cyprus) Panos Costa
Sales Manager	(Cyprus) Giorgos Georgiades
Marketing Department	(Cyprus) Koulla Stavrinidou
Ticketing & Operations Department	(Cyprus) Adamos Papadamou
Ticketing Department	(Cyprus) Kyriacos Vassiliades
Sports Material Department	(Cyprus) Kyriakos Vassiliou
Apollon Official Store	(Cyprus) Panagiotis Vassias
Apollon Official Store	(Cyprus) Marina Kyriacou
Secretary	(Cyprus) Stella Ignatiou

=== Technical and medical staff ===
Technical staff
Sports Director	(Cyprus) Makis Papaioannou
Football Director	(Cyprus) Ioannis Kyriakides
Head of Youth Development	(Cyprus) Giorgos Vasiliou
Team Manager	(Cyprus) Socratis Socratous
Head Coach	(Cyprus) Sofronis Avgousti
Assistant Coach	(Cyprus) Ioakim Ioakim
Assistant Coach	(Spain) Miguel Bedoya
Goalkeeping Coach	(Cyprus) George Nicolaou
Analyst	(Cyprus) Christos Panteli
Caregiver	(Cyprus) Panayiotis Theofanous
Caregiver	(Cyprus) Nektarios Stavrou
Medical staff
Head of Medical	(Greece) Kyriakos Kakavelakis
Rehabilitation Coach	(Cyprus) Nikolas Christoforou
Assistant Fitness Coach	(Cyprus) Petros Spyrou
Head of Physio	(Cyprus) Alexandros Solomonides
Physiotherapist	(Cyprus) Andreas Theofanous
Physiotherapist	(Cyprus) Christos Toumpas
Nutritionist	(Cyprus) Talia Evangelou

== Sponsorship ==
=== Main sponsors ===
- Major Sponsor – Stoiximan
- Official Sponsors:
  - Puma
  - Petrolina
  - Columbia Restaurants
  - Conercon Energy Solutions
  - Lamberts
  - Dimco
  - GVD Markets
  - BBF

== Honours ==
=== Domestic ===
- Cypriot First Division
  - Champions (4): 1990–91, 1993–94, 2005–06, 2021–22
  - Runners-up (6): 1983–84, 1988–89, 1992–93, 1996–97, 2017–18, 2020–21
- Cypriot Cup
  - Winners (9): 1965–66, 1966–67, 1985–86, 1991–92, 2000–01, 2009–10, 2012–13, 2015–16, 2016–17
  - Runners-up (9): 1964–65, 1981–82, 1986–87, 1992–93, 1994–95, 1997–98, 2010–11, 2017–18, 2025–26
- Cypriot Super Cup
  - Winners (4): 2006, 2016, 2017, 2022
  - Runners-up (11): 1966, 1967, 1982, 1986, 1991, 1992, 1994, 1998, 2001, 2010, 2013
- Cypriot Second Division
  - Winners (1): 1956–57

== European competition history ==
As of 11 August 2026

Competition	App.	Pld	W	D	L	GF	GA
UEFA Champions League	3	8	2	1	5	7	13
UEFA Europa League / UEFA Cup	16	85	32	18	35	126	136
UEFA Europa Conference League	3	12	5	2	5	18	16
UEFA Cup Winners' Cup	6	16	3	2	11	16	50
Total	28	121	42	23	56	167	215

=== Matches ===
Season	Competition	Round	Club	Home	Away	Aggregate
1966–67	UEFA Cup Winners' Cup	1R	(Belgium) Standard Liège	0–1^{1}	1–5	1–6
1967–68	UEFA Cup Winners' Cup	1R	(Hungary) Győri ETO	0–4^{2}	0–5	0–9
1982–83	UEFA Cup Winners' Cup	1R	(Spain) Barcelona	1–1	0–8	1–9
1984–85	UEFA Cup	1R	(Czechoslovakia) Bohemians	2–2	1–6	3–8
1986–87	UEFA Cup Winners' Cup	1R	(Sweden) Malmö FF	2–1	0–6	2–7
1989–90	UEFA Cup	1R	(Spain) Real Zaragoza	0–3	1–1	1–4
1991–92	European Cup	1R	(Romania) Universitatea Craiova	3–0	0–2	3–2
1991–92	European Cup	2R	(Socialist Federal Republic of Yugoslavia) Red Star Belgrade	0–2	1–3	1–5
1992–93	UEFA Cup Winners' Cup	1R	(England) Liverpool	1–2	1–6	2–8
1993–94	UEFA Cup	1R	(Hungary) Vác	4–0	0–2	4–2
1993–94	UEFA Cup	2R	(Italy) Inter Milan	3–3	0–1	3–4
1994–95	UEFA Cup	PR	(Albania) Teuta	4–2	4–1	8–3
1994–95	UEFA Cup	1R	(Switzerland) Sion	1–3	3–2 (aet)	4–5
1997–98	UEFA Cup	1Q	(Finland) MYPA	3–0	1–1	4–1
1997–98	UEFA Cup	2Q	(Belgium) RE Mouscron	0–0	0–3	0–3
1998–99	Cup Winners' Cup	QR	(Lithuania) FK Ekranas	3–3	2–1	5–4
1998–99	Cup Winners' Cup	1R	(Czech Republic) Baumit Jablonec	2–1	1–2 (aet)	3–3 (4–3 p)
1998–99	Cup Winners' Cup	2R	(Greece) Panionios	0–1	2–3	2–4
2001–02	UEFA Cup	QR	(Albania) Tirana	3–1	2–3	5–4
2001–02	UEFA Cup	1R	(Netherlands) Ajax	0–3	0–2	0–5
2006–07	UEFA Champions League	1Q	(Republic of Ireland) Cork City	1–1	0–1	1–2
2010–11	UEFA Europa League	3Q	(Russia) Sibir Novosibirsk	2–1	0–1	2–2 (a)
2013–14	UEFA Europa League	PO	(France) Nice	2–0	0–1	2–1
2013–14	UEFA Europa League	Group J	(Turkey) Trabzonspor	1–2	2–4	3rd place
2013–14	UEFA Europa League	Group J	(Poland) Legia Warsaw	0–2	1–0	3rd place
2013–14	UEFA Europa League	Group J	(Italy) Lazio	0–0	1–2	3rd place
2014–15	UEFA Europa League	PO	(Russia) Lokomotiv Moscow	1–1	4–1	5–2
2014–15	UEFA Europa League	Group A	(Switzerland) FC Zürich	3–2	1–3	4th place
2014–15	UEFA Europa League	Group A	(Spain) Villarreal	0–2	0–4	4th place
2014–15	UEFA Europa League	Group A	(Germany) Borussia Mönchengladbach	0–2	0–5	4th place
2015–16	UEFA Europa League	1Q	(Moldova) Saxan	2–0	2–0	4–0
2015–16	UEFA Europa League	2Q	(Lithuania) Trakai	4–0	0–0	4–0
2015–16	UEFA Europa League	3Q	(Azerbaijan) Gabala	1–1	0–1	1–2
2016–17	UEFA Europa League	3Q	(Switzerland) Grasshopper	3–3 (aet)	1–2	4–5
2017–18	UEFA Europa League	2Q	(Moldova) Zaria Bălți	3–0	2–1	5–1
2017–18	UEFA Europa League	3Q	(Scotland) Aberdeen	2–0	1–2	3–2
2017–18	UEFA Europa League	PO	(Denmark) Midtjylland	3–2	1–1	4–3
2017–18	UEFA Europa League	Group E	(France) Lyon	1–1	0–4	4th place
2017–18	UEFA Europa League	Group E	(England) Everton	0–3	2–2	4th place
2017–18	UEFA Europa League	Group E	(Italy) Atalanta	1–1	1–3	4th place
2018–19	UEFA Europa League	1Q	(Lithuania) Stumbras	2–0	0–1	2–1
2018–19	UEFA Europa League	2Q	(Bosnia and Herzegovina) Željezničar	3–1	2–1	5–2
2018–19	UEFA Europa League	3Q	(Belarus) Dynamo Brest	4–0	0–1	4–1
2018–19	UEFA Europa League	PO	(Switzerland) Basel	1–0	2–3	3–3
2018–19	UEFA Europa League	Group H	(Italy) Lazio	1–0	1–2	3rd place
2018–19	UEFA Europa League	Group H	(France) Marseille	2–2	3–1	3rd place
2018–19	UEFA Europa League	Group H	(Germany) Eintracht Frankfurt	2–3	0–2	3rd place
2019–20	UEFA Europa League	1Q	(Lithuania) Kauno Žalgiris	2–0	4–0	6–0
2019–20	UEFA Europa League	2Q	(Republic of Ireland) Shamrock Rovers	3–1 (aet)	1–2	4–3
2019–20	UEFA Europa League	3Q	Austria Wien	3–1	2–1	5–2
2019–20	UEFA Europa League	PO	(Netherlands) PSV Eindhoven	0–4	0–3	0–7
2020–21	UEFA Europa League	1Q	(Georgia (country)) Saburtalo Tbilisi	5–1	—	—
2020–21	UEFA Europa League	2Q	(Greece) OFI Crete	—	1–0	—
2020–21	UEFA Europa League	3Q	(Poland) Lech Poznań	0–5	—	
2021–22	UEFA Europa Conference League	2Q	(Slovakia) Žilina	1–3	2–2	3–5
2022–23	UEFA Champions League	3Q	(Israel) Maccabi Haifa	2–0	0–4	2–4
2022–23	UEFA Europa League	PO	(Greece) Olympiacos	1–1	1–1 (aet)	2–2 (1–3 p)
2022–23	UEFA Europa Conference League	Group E	(Netherlands) AZ	1–0	2–3	3rd place
2022–23	UEFA Europa Conference League	Group E	(Liechtenstein) Vaduz	1–0	0–0	3rd place
2022–23	UEFA Europa Conference League	Group E	(Ukraine) Dnipro-1	1–3	0–1	3rd place
2026–27	UEFA Conference League	2Q	(Georgia (country)) Dila Gori	3–0	4–0	7–0
2026–27	UEFA Conference League	3Q	(Norway) Brann	2–4 (a.e.t.)	1–0	3–4

Notes

- QR: Qualifying round
- PR: Preliminary round
- 1R: First round
- 2R: Second round
- 1Q: First qualifying round
- 2Q: Second qualifying round
- 3Q: Third qualifying round
- PO: Play-off round
- ^{1}: Both matches played in Belgium.
- ^{2}: Both matches played in Netherlands.

== See also ==
- Limassol derby
