= Cypriot Cup =

- Organiser(s): Cyprus Football Association
- Founded: 1934; 92 years ago
- Region: Cyprus
- Qualifier for: UEFA Europa League
- Domestic cup: Cypriot Super Cup
- Current champions: Pafos FC (2nd title)
- Most championships: APOEL (21 titles)
- Broadcaster(s): Cytavision; PrimeTel
- Website: cfacup.com.cy
- 2026–27 Cypriot Cup

The Cypriot Cup, formally known as the Cypriot Coca-Cola Cup of First and Second Division (Greek: Κύπελλο Κύπρου Coca-Cola A' και B' Κατηγορίας) for sponsorship purposes, is a Cypriot knockout football club competition, hosted annually by the Cyprus Football Association.

First held in 1934, it is the second most important competition in Cypriot football, after the Cypriot First Division. Since 2008, it is contested by teams from the first and second division, while teams from the third and fourth division compete in the Cypriot Cup for lower divisions.

The winners of the Cypriot Cup qualify for one of UEFA's European competitions, and a place in the Cypriot Super Cup. APOEL are the most successful team in the competition with 21 titles. Pafos FC are the current champions, having defeated Apollon Limassol 2-0 in the 2025–26 Final.

== History ==
The Cypriot Cup was first held in the 1934–35 season, the same year the Cyprus Football Association was founded. The 1934–35 Cypriot Cup was the first competition ever held by CFA, since it took part before the 1934–35 Cypriot First Division. The Cyprus Cup has been held every season since then, with the following exceptions:

1. During the period 1941–1944, the competition was not held due to World War II. Many Cypriots were voluntarily enlisted in the Greek and English army, and also formed a Cypriot constitution. Most teams had undertaken a national project by collecting money and clothing to be sent to Greece in order to assist the Greek people and the army. Moreover, many Greek refugees fled to Cyprus. Due to the war conditions, the CFA decided to suspend all the competitions.
2. During the periods 1955–58 and 1959–61, the competition was not held due to the unstable situation in Cyprus regarding the EOKA struggle. Meanwhile, a special cup was held in 1958–59 season. That season, the Cypriot Championship was not held for the same reasons. When the situation improved and Cyprus was heading towards independence, the CFA decided to bring back the teams which were inactive for several months and decided to launch a special cup called the "Independence Cup". The competition was official and its winners were listed as Cypriot Cup winners. The cup was held again in the 1961–62 season.
3. In the 2019–20 season, the competition was abandoned after the quarter-finals, due to the COVID-19 pandemic.

Since 1962, the sponsor of the competition is Coca-Cola Cyprus (Lanitis Bros Ltd). In 1998, the competition was officially named the Cypriot Coca-Cola Cup.

== Participating teams ==
At first, only the teams of the Cypriot First Division could take part in the competition. The Cypriot Second Division was considered non-league at the time, since it majorly consisted of reserve teams of the First Division clubs.

From 1952–53 until 2007–08, the teams of the Cypriot Second Division also took part in the Cypriot Cup, with the exception of the 1963–64 season. In certain seasons in the 1960s and 1970s, only the top teams of the league would participate. From 1975–76 onwards, every team of the Second Division would take part in the Cypriot Cup. No Second Division team has ever reached the final, but they managed to qualify to the semi-finals four times (Nea Salamis Famagusta in 1953–54, Orfeas Nicosia in 1983–84, PAEEK in 1984–85 and AEP Paphos in 2005–06).

From 1971–72 until 2007–08, the teams of the Cypriot Third Division would take part in Cypriot Cup. Since 2008–09, the Third Division teams are no longer allowed to participate, but if they so wish, they can take part in the Cypriot Cup for lower divisions. No Third Division team ever reached the final or the semi-finals, but they managed to qualify to the quarter-finals once (Chalkanoras Idaliou in 1987–88).

The teams of the Cypriot Fourth Division would take part in the Cypriot Cup from 1986–87 until 2007–08. Since 2008–09, the Cypriot Fourth Division teams do not participate in the Cypriot Cup, but they are allowed to take part in the Cypriot Cup for lower divisions.

== Format ==
The structure of the cup has changed throughout the years:

1. From 1934–35 until 1983–84, the competition was traditionally a pure knockout tournament. In all rounds each tie was played as a single leg and was held at the home ground of one of the two teams, according to the draw results. Each tie winner was qualifying to the next round. If a match was drawn, extra time was following. If extra time was ended also in a draw, there was a replay at the ground of the team who were away for the first game. Exceptions were the 1958–59 Cypriot Cup and the 1973–74 Cypriot Cup, with all ties being two-legged, except the final which was a single match.
2. From 1984–85 until 2001–02, the competition was traditionally a pure knockout tournament. The preliminary rounds were played as a single leg and was held at the home ground of one of the two teams, according to the draw results. From the first round all ties were two-legged, except the final which was a single match.
3. From 2002–03 until 2005–06, the competition was traditionally a pure knockout tournament. The preliminary rounds were played as a single leg and was held at the home ground of one of the two teams, according to the draw results. From the first round all ties were two-legged, except the round of 16 where the teams were drawn into four groups of four. The teams of each group played against each other twice, once at their home and once away. The group winners and runners-up of each group advanced to the quarter-finals. The final was a single match.
4. From 2006–07 until 2007–08, the competition was traditionally a pure knockout tournament. The preliminary rounds were played as a single leg and was held at the home ground of one of the two teams, according to the draw results. From the first round all ties were two-legged, except the quarter-finals where the teams were drawn into two groups of four. The teams of each group played against each other twice, once at their home and once away. The group winners and runners-up of each group advanced to the semi-finals. The final was a single match.
5. From 2008–09 until 2010–11, the competition was traditionally a pure knockout tournament. All ties were two-legged, except the final which was in a single match. Since 2011–12 Cypriot Cup the preliminary round was played as a single leg and was held at the home ground of one of the two teams, according to the draw results. From the first round all ties were two-legged, except the final which was a single match.
6. Since 2011–12, the competition is traditionally a pure knockout tournament. The preliminary round is played as a single leg and is held at the home ground of one of the two teams, according to the draw results. From the first round all ties are two-legged, except the final which is played in a single match.

== European participations ==
Since 1962–63, the winner of the Cypriot Cup qualifies to one of the UEFA competitions. Initially, this would be the Cup Winners' Cup. After the Cup Winners' Cup was abolished in 1999, the Cypriot Cup winner would qualify for the UEFA Cup (known as the Europa League since 2009). Since the 2022–23 season, the Cup winner enters the qualifying rounds of the UEFA Europa League.

Previously, if the cup winner was also the winner of the Cypriot First Division (meaning they had already qualified for a European competition), their place would be given to the runners-up of the Cup. Since 2015, after UEFA's decision, if the cup winner is also the winner of the Cypriot First Division, then the place of the Cypriot Cup winner is given to the second team of the domestic championship, and the fourth team also qualifies to the same European competition.

== Host stadiums (finals) ==
The Cypriot Cup final has taken place in six different stadiums. From 1934–35 until 1974–75, the final was held in Nicosia, at the old GSP Stadium, regardless of whether the stadium was the home ground of one of the two finalists. The only exception was the 1970–71 Cypriot Cup, where a replay final was needed after Omonia and Anorthosis had drawn at the GSP Stadium (Omonia's home ground). The replay was played at the GSE Stadium, Anorthosis' home ground in Famagusta. The GSP Stadium was chosen as the ground of the final as it was the stadium with the biggest capacity in Cyprus, at the time.

In 1975, the Tsirion Stadium was built in Limassol, and it hosted the final of the 1975–76 Cypriot Cup. The next two finals were played at the GSP Stadium. The final of the 1977–78 Cypriot Cup was the last one to take place at the old GSP Stadium. The final of the 1978–79 Cypriot Cup was played at the newly built Makario Stadium at Nicosia.

After 1981, the ground of the final was chosen with neutrality in mind: If the two teams were based in different cities, then the final would take place in a third city. In the event that this was not an option (there were only appropriate stadiums in Nicosia and Limassol until 1989), the ground of the final was determined by a draw.

In 1999, the new GSP Stadium was built, and hosted the 1999–2000 Cypriot Cup final between Omonia and APOEL. Since then, due to its large capacity, the GSP stadium is always considered to be the first choice option for the cup final, although it is often not a neutral ground, as APOEL and Omonia frequently appear in the final.

The following table shows the stadiums that held the Cypriot Cup finals from 1934–35 until 2022–23, the number of finals that each stadium held and the seasons where each stadium held the final. Although there are 81 editions of the Cypriot Cup, 85 finals have been played, as a replay was needed in five cases, while the 2019–20 Cypriot Cup was abandoned.

Stadium	N.	Seasons
Old GSP Stadium	37	1934–35 (2 finals), 1935–36, 1936–37 1937–38 1938–39, 1939–40, 1940–41, 1944–45, 1945–46, 1946–47, 1947–48, 1948–49, 1949–50, 1950–51, 1951–52, 1952–53, 1953–54, 1954–55, 1958–59, 1961–62, 1962–63 (2 finals), 1963–64, 1964–65, 1965–66, 1966–67, 1967–68, 1968–69, 1969–70, 1970–71, 1971–72, 1972–73, 1973–74, 1974–75, 1976–77, 1977–78
GSP Stadium	20	1999–2000, 2000–01, 2001–02, 2002–03, 2003–04, 2004–05, 2006–07, 2007–08, 2008–09, 2011–12, 2013–14, 2016–17, 2017–18, 2018–19, 2020–21, 2021–22, 2022–23, 2023–24, 2024–25, 2025–26
Tsirion Stadium	18	1975–76, 1980–81 (2 finals), 1981–82, 1982–83, 1983–84, 1985–86, 1986–87, 1987–88, 1988–89, 1989–90, 1991–92, 1993–94, 1994–95, 1995–96, 1998–99, 2012–13, 2015–16
Makario Stadium	7	1978–79, 1979–80, 1981–82 (replay), 1984–85, 1990–91, 1996–97, 1997–98
GSZ Stadium	5	1992–93, 2005–06, 2009–10, 2010–11, 2014–15
GSE Stadium	1	1970–71 (replay)

== Cypriot Cup Finals ==
The table below lists the teams that participated in the final of the cup each season.

Key to list of winners
(R)	Replay
*	Match went to extra time
†	Match decided via a penalty shoot-out after extra time
‡	Winning team won the Domestic Double (League title and Cypriot Cup)
(#)	Number of trophy won by club

Season	Winner	Score	Runner-up
1934–35	Trust ‡ (1)	0–0	APOEL
1934–35	Trust ‡ (1)	1–0 (R)	APOEL
1935–36	Trust (2)	4–1	Çetinkaya Türk
1936–37	APOEL ‡ (1)	2–1	Trust
1937–38	Trust (3)	2–1	AEL Limassol
1938–39	AEL Limassol (1)	3–1	APOEL
1939–40	AEL Limassol (2)	3–1	POL
1940–41	APOEL (2)	2–1	AEL Limassol
1941–42	Suspended due to World War II		
1942–43	Suspended due to World War II		
1943–44	Suspended due to World War II		
1944–45	EPA Larnaca ‡ (1)	3–1	APOEL
1945–46	EPA Larnaca ‡ (2)	2–1	APOEL
1946–47	APOEL ‡ (3)	4–1	Anorthosis
1947–48	AEL Limassol (3)	2–0	APOEL
1948–49	Anorthosis (1)	3–0	APOEL
1949–50	EPA Larnaca (3)	2–1	Anorthosis
1950–51	APOEL (4)	7–0	EPA Larnaca
1951–52	Çetinkaya Türk (1)	4–1	POL
1952–53	EPA Larnaca (4)	2–1	Çetinkaya Türk
1953–54	Çetinkaya Türk (2)	2–1	POL
1954–55	EPA Larnaca (5)	2–1	POL
1955–56	Not held		
1956–57	Not held		
1957–58	Not held		
1958–59	Anorthosis (2)	1–0	AEL Limassol
1959–60	Not held		
1960–61	Not held		
1961–62	Anorthosis ‡ (3)	5–2	Olympiakos Nicosia
1962–63	APOEL (5)	2–2	Anorthosis
1962–63	APOEL (5)	1–0 (R)	Anorthosis
1963–64	Anorthosis (4)	3–0	APOEL
1964–65	Omonia (1)	5–1	Apollon Limassol
1965–66	Apollon Limassol (1)	4–2	Nea Salamina
1966–67	Apollon Limassol (2)	1–0	Alki Larnaca
1967–68	APOEL (6)	2–1	EPA Larnaca
1968–69	APOEL (7)	1–0	Omonia
1969–70	POL (6)	2–1	Alki Larnaca
1970–71	Anorthosis (5)	1–1 *	Omonia
1970–71	Anorthosis (5)	1–0 * (R)	Omonia
1971–72	Omonia ‡ (2)	3–1 *	POL
1972–73	APOEL ‡ (8)	1–0	POL
1973–74	Omonia ‡ (3)	2–0	ENP
1974–75	Anorthosis (6)	3–2	ENP
1975–76	APOEL (9)	6–0	Alki Larnaca
1976–77	Olympiakos Nicosia (1)	2–0	Alki Larnaca
1977–78	APOEL (10)	3–0	Olympiakos Nicosia
1978–79	APOEL (11)	1–0 *	AEL Limassol
1979–80	Omonia (4)	3–1	Alki Larnaca
1980–81	Omonia ‡ (5)	1–1 *	ENP
1980–81	Omonia ‡ (5)	3–0 (R)	ENP
1981–82	Omonia ‡ (6)	2–2 *	Apollon Limassol
1981–82	Omonia ‡ (6)	4–1 (R)	Apollon Limassol
1982–83	Omonia ‡ (7)	2–1	ENP
1983–84	APOEL (12)	3–1 *	POL

Season	Winner	Score	Runner-up
1984–85	AEL Limassol (4)	1–0	EPA Larnaca
1985–86	Apollon Limassol (3)	2–0	APOEL
1986–87	AEL Limassol (5)	1–0	Apollon Limassol
1987–88	Omonia (8)	2–1	AEL Limassol
1988–89	AEL Limassol (6)	3–2 *	Aris Limassol
1989–90	Nea Salamina (1)	3–2	Omonia
1990–91	Omonia (9)	1–0	Olympiakos Nicosia
1991–92	Apollon Limassol (4)	1–0	Omonia
1992–93	APOEL (13)	4–1	Apollon Limassol
1993–94	Omonia (10)	1–0 *	Anorthosis
1994–95	APOEL (14)	4–2	Apollon Limassol
1995–96	APOEL ‡ (15)	2–0 *	AEK Larnaca
1996–97	APOEL (16)	2–0	Omonia
1997–98	Anorthosis ‡ (7)	3–1	Apollon Limassol
1998–99	APOEL (17)	2–0	Anorthosis
1999–00	Omonia (11)	4–2	APOEL
2000–01	Apollon Limassol (5)	1–0	Nea Salamina
2001–02	Anorthosis (8)	1–0	Ethnikos Achna
2002–03	Anorthosis (9)	0–0 † (Note: Score was 0–0 after extra time. Anorthosis Famagusta won the penalty shoot-out 5–3.)	AEL Limassol
2003–04	AEK Larnaca (7)	2–1	AEL Limassol
2004–05	Omonia (12)	2–0	Digenis Morphou
2005–06	APOEL (18)	3–2 *	AEK Larnaca
2006–07	Anorthosis (10)	3–2	Omonia
2007–08	APOEL (19)	2–0	Anorthosis
2008–09	APOP Kinyras (1)	2–0	AEL Limassol
2009–10	Apollon Limassol (6)	2–1	APOEL
2010–11	Omonia (13)	1–1 † (Note: Score was 1–1 after extra time. Omonia won the penalty shoot-out 4–3.)	Apollon Limassol
2011–12	Omonia (14)	1–0	AEL Limassol
2012–13	Apollon Limassol (7)	2–1 *	AEL Limassol
2013–14	APOEL ‡ (20)	2–0	Ermis Aradippou
2014–15	APOEL ‡ (21)	4–2	AEL Limassol
2015–16	Apollon Limassol (8)	2–1	Omonia
2016–17	Apollon Limassol (9)	1–0	APOEL
2017–18	AEK Larnaca (8)	2–1	Apollon Limassol
2018–19	AEL Limassol (7)	2–0	APOEL
2019–20	Abandoned due to COVID-19 pandemic		
2020–21	Anorthosis (11)	2–1 *	Olympiakos Nicosia
2021–22	Omonia (15)	0–0 † (Note: Score was 0–0 after extra time. Omonia won the penalty shoot-out 5-4.)	Ethnikos Achna
2022–23	Omonia (16)	1–0	AEL Limassol
2023–24	Pafos (1)	3–0	Omonia
2024–25	AEK Larnaca (9)	0–0 † (Note: Score was 0–0 after extra time. AEK Larnaca won the penalty shoot-out 5–4.)	Pafos
2025–26	Pafos (2)	2–0	Apollon Limassol
2026–27			

Notes:

- Following a decision by the executive committee of the Cyprus Football Association (CFA/KOP), upon the opinion of its legal advisor, on 19 June 2025, a request by AEK Larnaca was approved for the recognition of the titles of EPA Larnaca and Pezoporikos Larnaca in the name of AEK Larnaca.

== Performance by club ==
Club	Winners	Runners-up	Winning Seasons
APOEL	21	12	1936–37, 1940–41, 1946–47, 1950–51, 1962–63, 1967–68, 1968–69, 1972–73, 1975–76, 1977–78, 1978–79, 1983–84, 1992–93, 1994–95, 1995–96, 1996–97, 1998–99, 2005–06, 2007–08, 2013–14, 2014–15
Omonia	16	8	1964–65, 1971–72, 1973–74, 1979–80, 1980–81, 1981–82, 1982–83, 1987–88, 1990–91, 1993–94, 1999–2000, 2004–05, 2010–11, 2011–12, 2021–22, 2022–23
Anorthosis	11	6	1948–49, 1958–59, 1961–62, 1963–64, 1970–71, 1974–75, 1997–98, 2001–02, 2002–03, 2006–07, 2020–21
AEK Larnaca	9	12	1944-45, 1945–46, 1949–50, 1952–53, 1954–55, 1969–70, 2003–04, 2017–18, 2024–25
Apollon Limassol	9	9	1965–66, 1966–67, 1985–86, 1991–92, 2000–01, 2009–10, 2012–13, 2015–16, 2016–17
AEL Limassol	7	12	1938–39, 1939–40, 1947–48, 1984–85, 1986–87, 1988–89, 2018–19
Trust	3	1	1934–35, 1935–36, 1937–38
Çetinkaya Türk	2	1	1951–52, 1953–54
Pafos	2	1	2023–24, 2025–26
Olympiakos Nicosia	1	4	1976–77
Nea Salamina	1	2	1989–90
APOP Kinyras	1	–	2008–09
Alki Larnaca	–	5	
Enosis Neon Paralimni	–	4	
Ethnikos Achna	–	2	
Aris Limassol	–	1	
Digenis Morphou	–	1	
Ermis Aradippou	–	1	

Notes:

- Following a decision by the executive committee of the Cyprus Football Association (CFA/KOP), upon the opinion of its legal advisor, on 19 June 2025, a request by AEK Larnaca was approved for the recognition of the titles of EPA Larnaca and Pezoporikos Larnaca in the name of AEK Larnaca.

== Records and statistics ==
=== Team ===
Description	Record	Details
Most wins	21	APOEL
Most consecutive wins	4	Omonia (1980, 1981, 1982, 1983)
Most appearances in a final	33	APOEL
Most final appearances without ever winning	5	Alki Larnaca (1967, 1970, 1976, 1977, 1980)
Most final appearances without ever losing	1	APOP Kinyras (2009)
Longest gap between wins	34 years	AEK Larnaca (1970-2004)
Biggest win in a final	7 goals	APOEL 7-0 EPA Larnaca (1951)
Most goals in a final	7	APOEL 7-0 EPA Larnaca (1951); Anorthosis 5-2 Olympiakos Nicosia (1962)
Most defeats in a final	12	APOEL; AEL Limassol; AEK Larnaca

== See also ==
- Cypriot Super Cup
- Cypriot Women's Cup
- Cypriot Cup for lower divisions

== Sources ==
- Κυριάκου, Άκη. "Εφτά "μικροί" σε 12 τελικούς Κυπέλλου | News". www.sigmalive.com (in Greek). Archived from the original on 20 August 2016.
- "Οι τελικοί κυπέλλου στο παλιό ΓΣΠ" (in Greek). Archived from the original on 4 November 2015.

== Bibliography ==
- Gavreilides, Michalis; Papamoiseos, Stelios (2001). Ένας αιώνας Κυπριακό ποδόσφαιρο [One century Cypriot football] (in Greek). Nicosia: The writer. ISBN 9963-8720-1-8.
- Meletiou, Giorgos (2011). Κυπριακό ποδόσφαιρο 1900–1960 [Cypriot Football 1900–1960] (in Greek). Nicosia: Power Publishing. ISBN 978-9963-688-87-6.
- Stephanidis, Giorgos (2003). 40 χρόνια κυπριακές ομάδες στην Ευρώπη [40 years Cypriot teams in Europe] (in Greek). Nicosia: Haravgi. ISBN 9963-8841-1-3.
- Stephanidis, Giorgos (2015). Μεγάλες Στιγμές Κυπριακού Ποδοσφαίρου 1934-2014 [Big moments of Cypriot football] (in Greek). Cyprus: The writer. ISBN 978-9963-8841-3-1.
- Papamoiseos, Stelios (2013). Από την... ενοποίηση στ΄ αστέρια - Κυπριακό Ποδόσφαιρο 1953-2013 [From the unnification to the stars - Cypriot football 1953-2013] (in Greek). Nicosia: The writer.
- Papamoiseos, Stelios (2015). 80 χρόνια κυπριακό ποδόσφαιρο 1935-2015 [80 years Cypriot football 1935-2015] (in Greek). Nicosia: The writer. ISBN 978-9963-8720-6-0.
