= Alki Larnaca FC =

Alki Larnaca
- Full name: Alki Larnaca; Αλκή Λάρνακα
- Nickname: Αθάνατη (Immortal)
- Founded: April 10, 1948; 78 years ago
- Ground: Neo GSZ Stadium, Larnaca, Cyprus
- Capacity: 13,032
Home colours	Away colours

Alki Larnaca (Greek: ΑΛΚΗ Λάρνακας, ALKI Larnakas) was a Cypriot football club based in the town of Larnaca. The club was founded in 1948 and it was dissolved on the 6th of May 2014 due to financial issues. The club's colours were blue and red. They reached the Cypriot Cup final on five occasions without a win. The club was refounded as Alki 1948 Larnaca in May 2024, and are now playing in the fourth tier of Cypriot football.

== History ==
1979 was the best year in club's history. They finished third in the Cypriot Championship and played the final in the Cypriot Cup, losing to APOEL Nicosia, which were also the champions. That gave them the right to play in the UEFA Cup, where they were eliminated in the first round by Dinamo Bucharest.

The team was crowned Champions of the Cypriot Second Division for the season 2009–10 and have participated in the Cypriot First Division until its dissolution.

== Honours ==
- Cypriot Cup
  - Runners-up (5): 1966–67, 1969–70, 1975–76, 1976–77, 1979–80
- Cypriot Second Division
  - Champions (4): 1959–60, 1981–82, 2000–01, 2009–10

== European Cups history ==
UEFA Cup:

Season	Round	Country	Club	Home	Away	Aggregate
1979–80	1	Romania	Dinamo București	0–9	0–3	0–12

== Managers ==
- (Cyprus) Panayiotis Xiourouppas (8 January 2009 – 30 June 2009)
- (Cyprus) Marios Constantinou (21 March 2010 – 19 October 2010)
- (Israel) Itzhak Shum (21 October 2010 – 11 June 2011)
- (Serbia) Radmilo Ivančević (1 January 2011 – 30 July 2011)
- (Cyprus) Kostas Kaiafas (1 August 2011 – 4 November 2012)
- (Cyprus) Neophytos Larkou (5 November 2012 – 9 April 2013)
- (Cyprus) Kostas Kaiafas (10 April 2013 – 10 March 2014)
- (Serbia) Vesko Mihajlović (10 March 2014 – 6 May 2014)

== Notable players ==
- (Australia) Dimitri Hatzimouratis
- (Cyprus) Tassos Vanellis
- (Greece) Christos Kostis
- (Italy) Bruno Cirillo
- (Iran) Ferydoon Zandi
