= Armenian Young Men's Association =

Armenian association football team from Nicosia, Cyprus

- Հայ Երիտասարդաց Միութիւն
- AYMA's logotype
- Abbreviation: AYMA
- Formation: 1934
- Location: Nicosia, Cyprus

The Armenian Young Men's Association (AYMA) (Armenian: Հայ Երիտասարդաց Միութիւն, Greek: Ένωση Αρμενίων Νέων) is a cultural and sporting club of the Armenians of Cyprus, headquartered in Nicosia. A member of the international federation AYMA, it was founded in 1934 in the Armenian quarter of Nicosia, its first president was Anania Mahdessian. The club has a Scouts movement – the AYMA 77th Scouts – which is part of the Cypriot Scout Movement. The club operates a junior Football Academy. In the past it has had teams in hockey, darts, and table tennis.

== A centre of Armenian-Cypriot national, cultural and social life ==
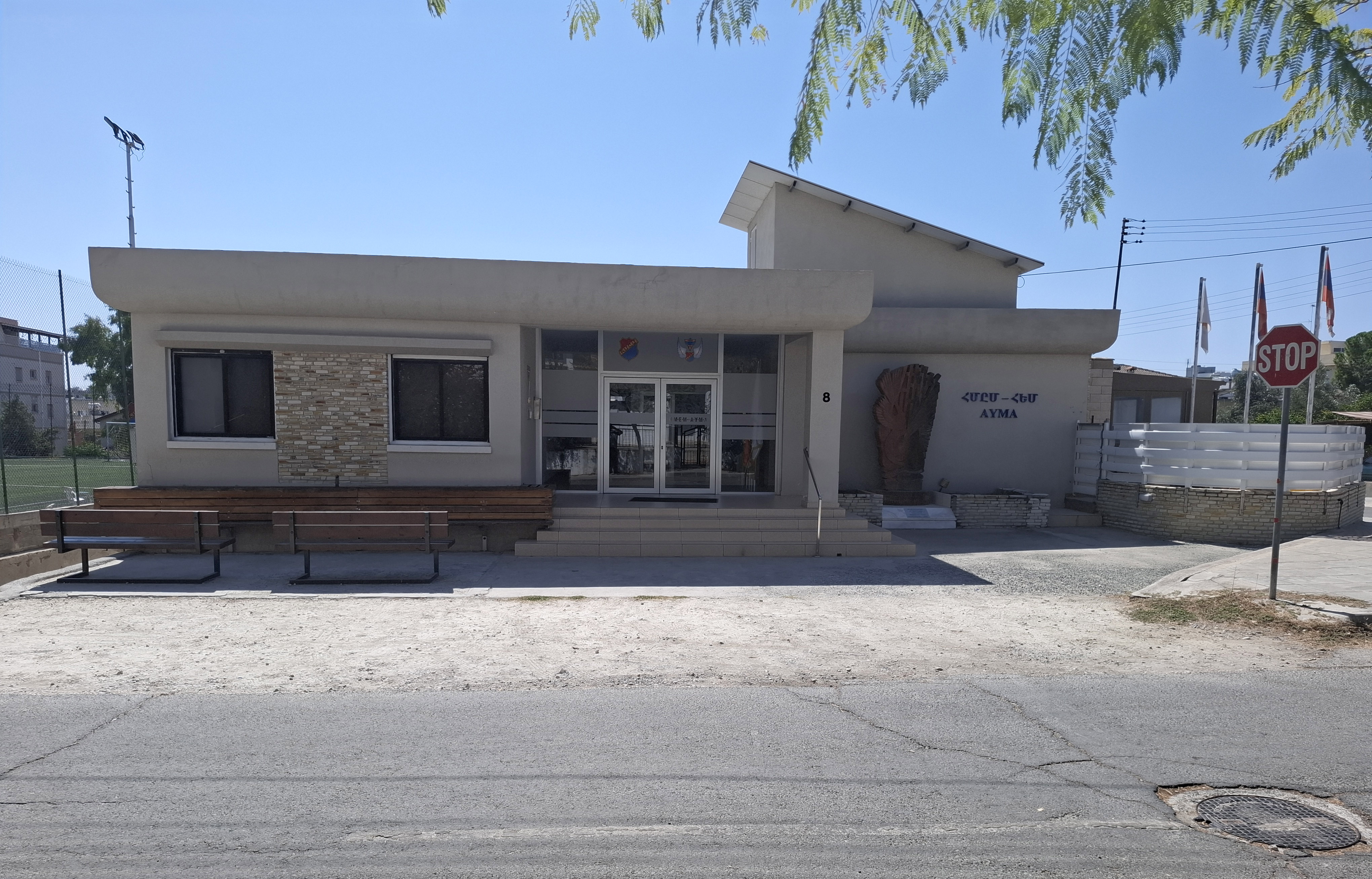
AYMA premises in Strovolos

AYMA is considered to be one main centres of Armenian-Cypriot cultural and social life. Its premises are located in Strovolos, Nicosia, very near the Sourp Asdvadzadzin church. In the same premises are housed the Armenian National Committee of Cyprus (1965), the local branch of the Armenian Youth Federation (1977), the Azadamard Youth Centre (1986), the Armenian Relief Society (HOM, 1988) and the Armenian Educational and Cultural Association of Cyprus (Hamazkayin, 1949/1999), all branches of the Armenian Revolutionary Federation party.

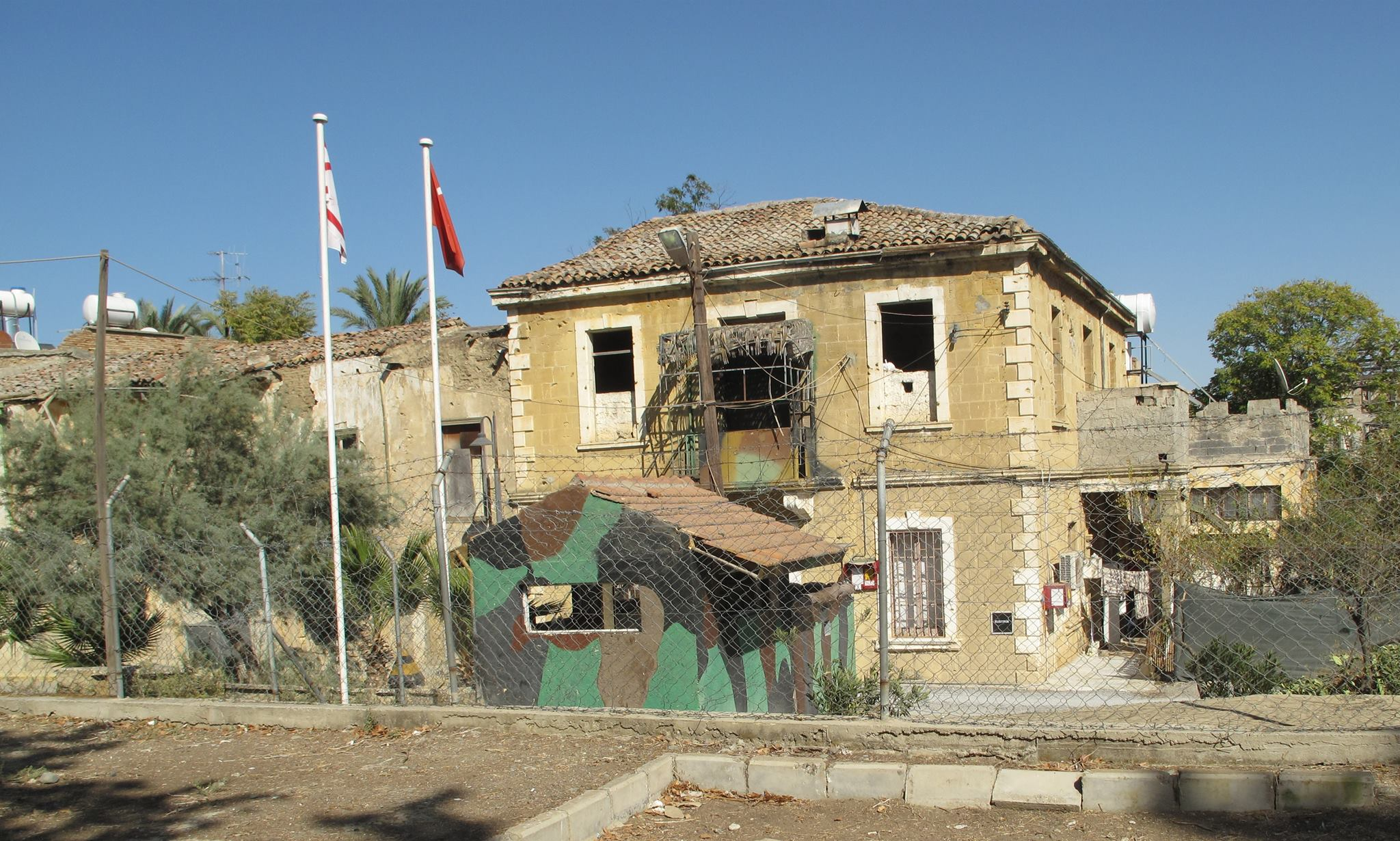
The old AYMA clubhouse in occupied Nicosia

In the premises of AYMA and/or by its affiliated associations are organised various social, cultural and charity events, such as lunches, speeches, exhibitions, fund-raisings etc. AYMA is also a place where old and young members of the Armenian-Cypriot community gather to converse and play cards, billiards and tavli. The Armenian Youth Federation organises summer camps, while Hamazkayin organises dance and theatre performances, as well as art exhibitions. In late 2009, the club was renovated and enlarged and was officially inaugurated on 28 February 2010 by Armenian MP Vartkes Mahdessian. On 28 April 2002, Bishop Varoujan Hergelian unveiled an obelisk containing some bone remains of martyrs from the Der Zor desert in Syria.

== Football ==
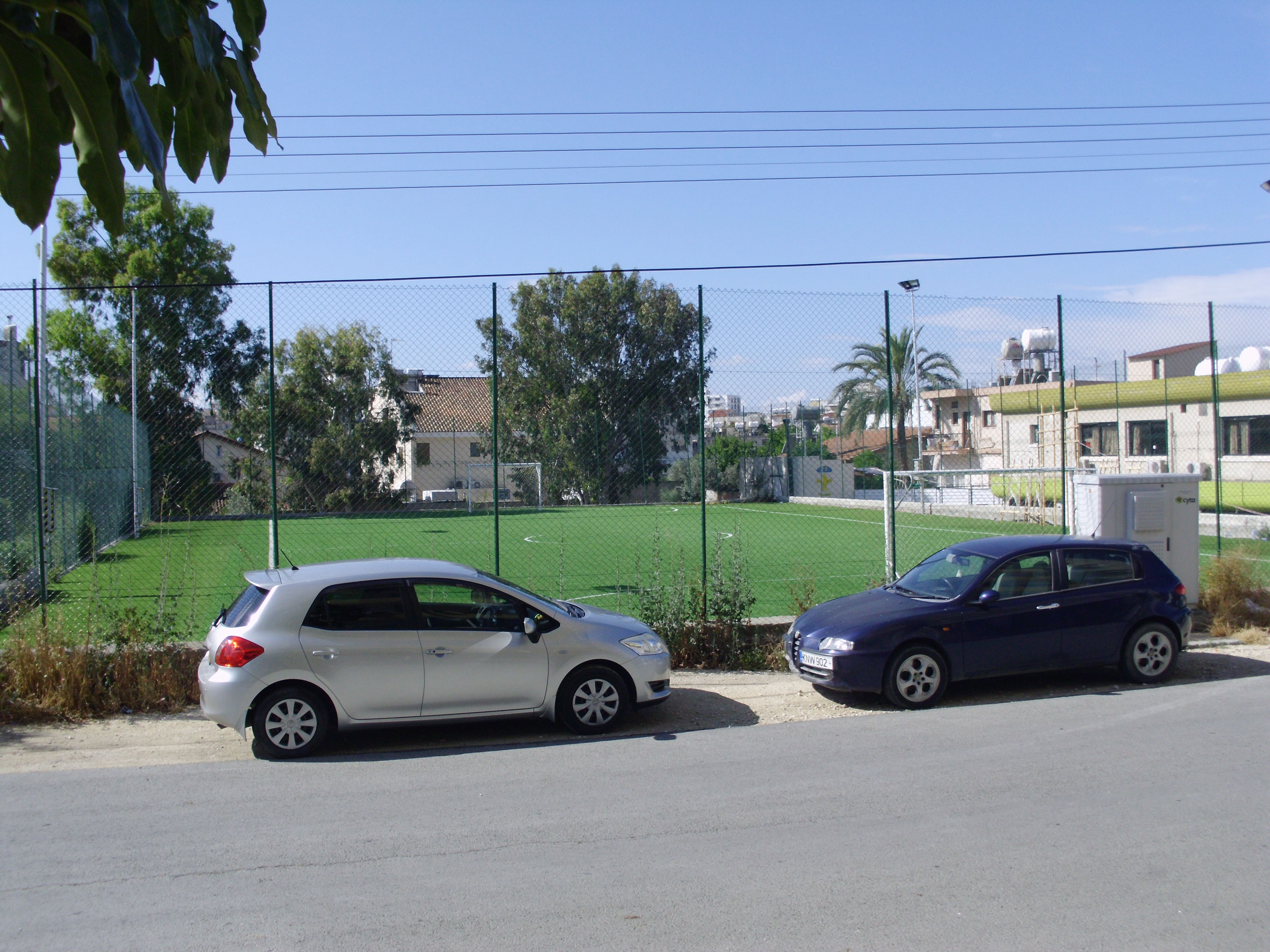
AYMA's football pitch

During the first years it participated in friendly games, until joining KOP. Today the club participates in the amateur championships of Nicosia and the agricultural championships of Cyprus.

=== Participation in the 1st Division ===
AYMA joined KOP in 1945. In 1947, it participated in the 1st Division, receiving position 4, while in the Cup it reached the semifinals, where it was excluded by AEL. In the next season (1948–49), AYMA took position 6 while for a second consecutive time reached the semifinals for the cup, losing again to AEL. These were her best participations in the 1st division of Cypriot football, in the next participations it finished in the last positions of marking.

The 1949–1950 championship was one of the worst for AYMA, as it finished eighth and last; in the cup it again reached the semifinals, losing to Pezoporikos. The fall continued also during the 1950–1951 period, taking the seventh pre-last position and excluded from the cup in the first round. In 1951–1952 again in the seventh place and exclusion in the first round of the cup, eighth place in 1952–1953 and ninth in 1953–1954. In 1954–1955, it finished eighth, ninth in 1955–1956, and her last presence in the first Division in 1960–1961, terminating 13th and final.

Overall, it had 11 participations and in 176 matches it had 23 victories, 126 defeats and 27 ties. In fact, in the 1953 and 1962 championships it had no victory.

== Hockey ==
AYMA was a pioneer of hockey in Cyprus, participating in all three championships that took place after World War II, winning one. It also participating in international friendly games with distinction.

== Field ==
The club was originally based in its own field on Roccas bastion of the Wall of Nicosia, since 1947 it uses GSP.

== See also ==
- Scouting and Guiding in Cyprus

== Sources ==
- Μιχάλη Γαβριηλίδη – Στέλιου Παπαμωυσέους, Ένας αιώνας Κυπριακό ποδόσφαιρο, 2001
- ΑΠΟΕΛ 1926–2001 75 χρόνια ένδοξης πορείας, έκδοση ΑΠΟΕΛ Λευκωσία 2002
