= EPA Larnaca FC =

EPA Larnaca
- Full name: Enosis Pezoporikou Amol (Ένωσις Πεζοπορικού Αμολ)
- Short name: EPA
- Founded: 1930; 96 years ago
- Dissolved: 1994; 32 years ago
- Ground: GSZ Stadium
Home colours	Away colours

EPA Larnaca (Greek: Ένωσις Πεζοπορικού Αμολ, Enosis Pezoporikou Amol) was a Cypriot football club based in the city of Larnaca. Founded in 1930 with the merge of two local clubs, Pezoporikos and AMOL, the club was a founding member of Cyprus Football Association and participated in the first Cypriot Championship in 1934/35. Few years later, Pezoporikos was re-established. The golden era of the club was in the period 1944–1946, when the team won the Double in two consecutive seasons. In 1970, the club participated in the Greek First National Division, as Cyprus champions. They were also cup winners 5 times. In 1994, they merged with Pezoporikos Larnaca and formed AEK Larnaca FC.

The team had also basketball and volleyball sections. The women's volleyball team won the first Cyprus Championship in 1976.

Following a decision by the Executive Committee of the Cyprus Football Association (CFA/KOP), upon the opinion of its legal advisor, on 19th June 2025, a request by AEK Larnaca was approved for the recognition of the titles of EPA Larnaca and Pezoporikos Larnaca in the name of AEK Larnaca.

== Trophies ==
=== Football ===
- Cypriot Championship:
  - Champions (3): 1944–45, 1945–46, 1969–70
  - Runners-up (5): 1938–39, 1946–47, 1949–50, 1951–52, 1971–72
- Cypriot Cup:
  - Winners (5):1944–45, 1945–46, 1949–50, 1952–53, 1954–55
  - Runners-up (3): 1950–51, 1967–68, 1984–85
- Pakkos Shield:
  - Winners (1): 1955
  - Runners-up (1): 1953
- Cypriot Second Division:
  - Champions (1): 1989–90

=== Volleyball (women) ===
- Cypriot Championship:
  - Champions (1): 1976
- Cyprus Cup:
  - Runners-up (1): 1978

== History in European competition ==
=== Overall ===
Competition	Pld	W	D	L	GF	GA	GD
European Cup	2	0	0	2	0	16	-16
UEFA Cup	4	0	0	4	0	6	-6
Total	0	0	0	6	0	22	–22

=== Matches ===
Season	Competition	Round1	Club	1st leg	2nd leg	Agg.
1970–71	European Cup	1R	(West Germany) Borussia Mönchengladbach	0–6 (H) (Note: "Home" leg played at Rosenaustadion)	0–10 (A)	0–16
1972–73	UEFA Cup	1R	(Soviet Union) Ararat Yerevan	0–1 (H)	0–1 (A)	0–2
1987–88	UEFA Cup	1R	(Romania) Victoria București	0–1 (H)	0–3 (A)	0–4
