= Pezoporikos Larnaca FC =

Pezoporikos Πεζοπορικός
- Full name: Πεζοπορικός Όμιλος Λάρνακας; Pezoporikos Omilos Larnacas
- Short name: POL (ΠΟΛ)
- Founded: 1927; 99 years ago
- Dissolved: 1994; 32 years ago
- Ground: GSZ Stadium
Home colours	Away colours

Pezoporikos Omilos Larnacas (Greek: Πεζοπορικός Όμιλος Λάρνακας) was a Cypriot sports club based in Larnaca with football, basketball and volleyball teams. Founded in 1927, the football club joined the Cypriot Championship in 1938, winning it twice as well as one Cypriot Cup. The colours of the club were green and white. In 1994 the club merged with EPA Larnaca and they formed AEK Larnaca (Αθλητική Ένωση Κιτίου).

The club also had a basketball and volleyball department and were basketball champions four times and five times cup winners. Since the 1990–91 season, the club dominated the Cyprus Basketball by winning 3 championships and one cup in four years. During the 1993–94 season the team eliminated Hapoel Eilat with 86–80 and 65–65 for the Korać Cup and qualified in the second round of Korać Cup where they were eliminated by Panionios. Even as champions, the club merged like the football department, however, AEK Larnaca didn't continue with the same success as Pezoporikos Basketball Club had.

Founding member of the Cyprus Volleyball Federation, the volleyball women's team was more successful than the men's one. The women's team won the Cup once in 1979 when they beat AEL Limassol in the final 3–2. They were Runners up twice each in the championship and in the cup.

Following a decision by the Executive Committee of the Cyprus Football Association (CFA/KOP), upon the opinion of its legal advisor, on 19th June 2025, a request by AEK Larnaca was approved for the recognition of the titles of EPA Larnaca and Pezoporikos Larnaca in the name of AEK Larnaca.

== Former players (football section) ==
- (Scotland) Jim McSherry (1983–84)
- (Scotland) Ian Alexander (1985–86)
- (Greece) Spyros Livathinos (1986–88)
- (Cyprus) Stavros Papadopoulos (1980–81)
- (Cyprus) Neophytos Larkou (1987–94)
- (Germany) Uwe Bialon (1987–94)
- (England) Keith Miller (1972-73)

== Honours ==
=== Football ===
- Cypriot Championship:
  - Champions (2): 1953–54, 1987–88
  - Runner-up (8): 1939–40, 1952–53, 1954–55, 1956–57, 1957–58, 1969–70, 1973–74, 1981–82
- Cypriot Cup:
  - Winners (1): 1969–70
  - Runner-up (7): 1939–40, 1951–52, 1953–54, 1954–55, 1971–72, 1972–73, 1983–84
- Super cup:
  - Runner-up (2): 1954, 1988

=== Basketball ===
- Cyprus Basketball Division 1: (4) 1973, 1991,1992,1994
- Cypriot Cup (5): 1969, 1970, 1971, 1972, 1992

==== Former players ====
- (United States) Darrell Armstrong (1993)
- (Mexico) William Sanchez (1999)

=== Volleyball (women) ===
- Cypriot Championship:
  - Runner-up (2): 1977, 1989
- Cypriot Cup:
  - Winners (1): 1979
  - Runner-up (7): 1989,1990

== History in European competition ==
=== Overall ===
Competition	Pld	W	D	L	GF	GA	GD
European Cup	2	0	0	2	2	7	-5
European Cup Winners' Cup	6	0	2	4	2	25	-23
UEFA Cup	6	0	2	4	6	20	-14
Total	14	0	4	10	10	52	–42

=== Matches ===
Season	Competition	Round1	Club	1st leg	2nd leg	Agg.
1970–71	European Cup Winners' Cup	1R	(Wales) Cardiff City	0–8 (A)	0–0 (H)	0–8
1972–73	European Cup Winners' Cup	1R	(Republic of Ireland) Cork Hibernians	1–2 (H)	1–4 (A)	2–6
1973–74	European Cup Winners' Cup	1R	(Sweden) Malmö FF	0–0 (H)	0–11 (A)	0–11
1978–79	UEFA Cup	1R	(Poland) Śląsk Wrocław	2–2 (H)	1–5 (A)	3–7
1980–81	UEFA Cup	1R	(West Germany) VfB Stuttgart	0–6 (A)	1–4 (H)	1–10
1982–83	UEFA Cup	1R	(Switzerland) Zürich	2–2 (H)	0–1 (A)	2–3
1988–89	European Cup	1R	(Sweden) IFK Göteborg	1–2 (H)	1–5 (A)	2–7
