= GSP Stadium (1902) =

Football stadium in Nicosia, Cyprus

Coordinates: 35.167954°N 33.355804°E

- Old GSP Stadium
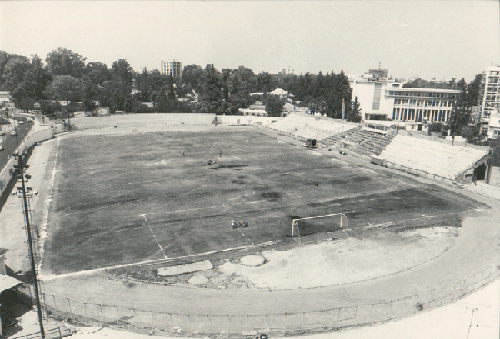
- Interactive map of GSP Stadium
- Full name: GSP Stadium, Eugenia and Antonios Theodotou
- Location: Nicosia, Cyprus
- Owner: Pancyprian Gymnastic Association
- Capacity: 12,000

Construction
- Built: 1902
- Opened: 1902
- Closed: 1998
- Demolished: 1999

Tenants
- Trust (1924–1938); APOEL (1930–1978); Olympiakos (1934–1998); Omonia (1958–1978); AYMA (1947–1998); Çetinkaya Türk S.K. (1930–1958); Orfeas (1958–1968)

The GSP Stadium (Greek: Στάδιο Γυμναστικός Σύλλογος "Τα Παγκύπρια", romanized: Stádio Gymnastikós Sýllogos "Ta Pankýpria", lit. 'All-Cyprus Gymnastics Club Stadium') was a football stadium in Nicosia, Cyprus. It had a capacity of 12,000 and was built in 1902 with donations given by Greek Cypriot Nicosians. On 17 October 1934, after a general assembly of the GSP association, the stadium was renamed "GSP Stadium, Eugenia and Antonios Theodotou" in honour of the stadium's major benefactors.

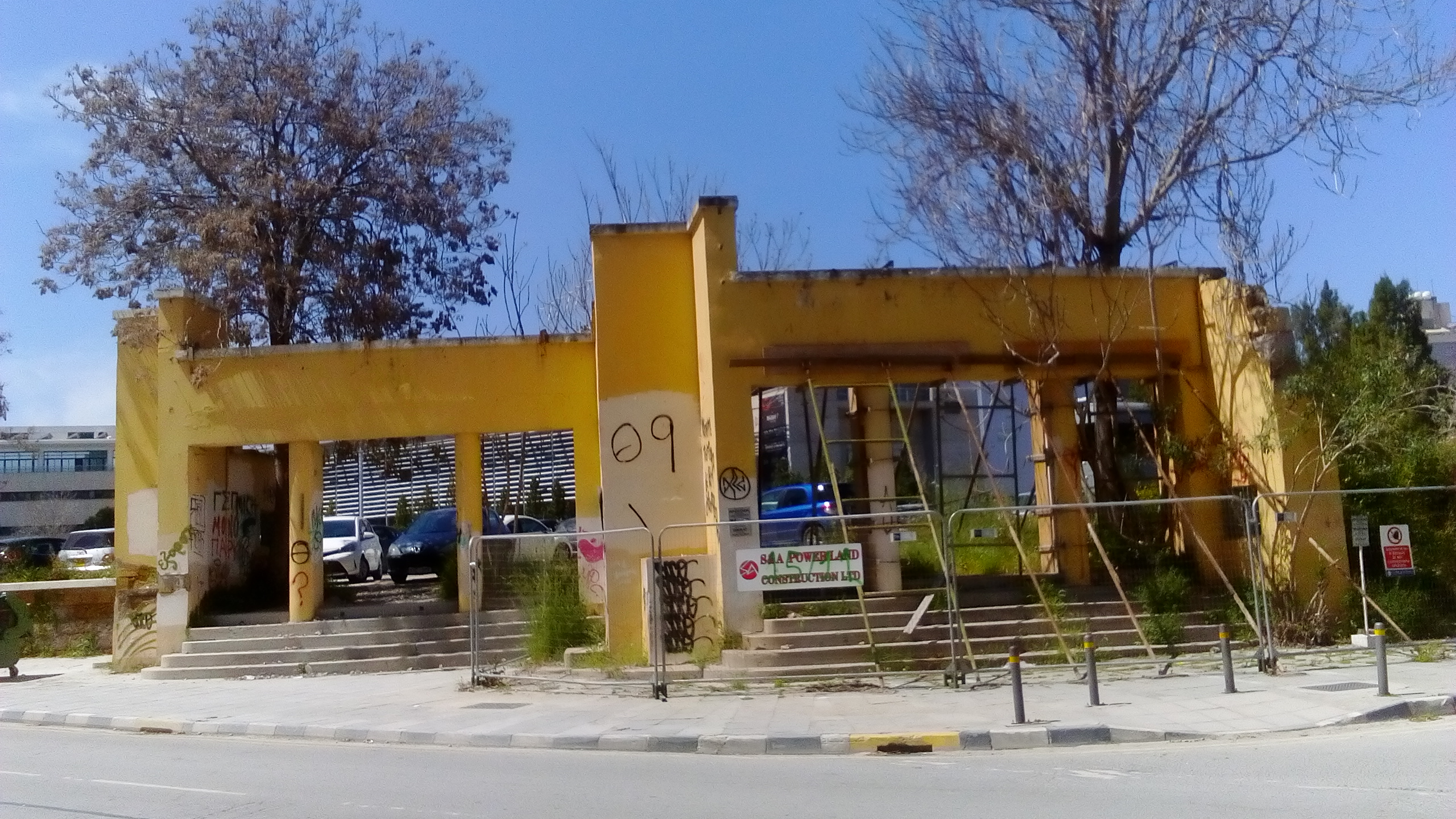
Stadium's entry in 2019

The stadium served as the home stadium for the Nicosia football clubs of Trust, APOEL, Olympiakos Nicosia, Omonia, Orfeas Nicosia, AYMA and Çetinkaya Türk S.K. The Cyprus national football team had also played home games there in the past. It was located at the centre of Nicosia and often used for large music concerts as well. The stadium was largely demolished in 1999. Today the grounds are used as a park and ride facility. In 2013, the theatre building of the Cyprus Theatre Organisation was completed and inaugurated in the western side of the old stadium.

Plans to redevelop the area as a pedestrian site are expected to cost about €20 million and are due to be completed in 2024. A public clock, part of the original structure has been preserved as landmark.
