= 1948 in association football =

The following are the association football events of the year 1948 throughout the world.

== Events ==
=== Clubs reformed in 1948 ===
- Weston-super-Mare A.F.C.
- CSKA Sofia

== Winners club national championship ==
=== Argentina ===
Independiente

=== Austria ===
- Rapid Vienna

=== Bulgaria ===
- CSKA Sofia

=== Chile ===
- Audax Italiano

=== Colombia ===
- Santa Fe

=== Costa Rica ===
- Herediano

=== East Germany ===
- SG Planitz

=== England ===
for fuller coverage see 1947–48 in English football

- First Division: Arsenal
- Second Division: Birmingham City
- Third Division North: Lincoln City
- Third Division South: Queens Park Rangers
- FA Cup: Manchester United

=== France ===
- Olympique de Marseille

=== Hong Kong ===
- Kitchee

=== Iceland ===
- KR

=== Italy ===
- Torino F.C.

=== Mexico ===
- León

=== Paraguay ===
- Olimpia Asunción

=== Poland ===
- Cracovia

=== Romania ===
- Divizia A: ITA Arad
- Divizia B: Dezrobirea Constanța, Metalochimic București, Politehnica Timișoara, Phoenix Baia Mare
- Cupa României: ITA Arad

=== Scotland ===
for fuller coverage see 1947–48 in Scottish football

- League Division A: Hibernian
- League Division B: East Fife
- League Division C: East Stirlingshire
- Scottish Cup: Rangers
- Scottish League Cup: East Fife

=== Spain ===
- Barcelona

=== Sweden ===
- IFK Norrköping

=== Switzerland ===
- AC Bellinzona

=== Uruguay ===
- Nacional

=== USSR ===
- CSKA Moscow

=== Yugoslavia ===
- Dinamo Zagreb

== International tournaments ==
- 1948 British Home Championship (4 October 1947 – 10 May 1948)

England

- Olympic Games in London, United Kingdom (26 July – 13 August 1948)
  1. Sweden
  2. Yugoslavia
  3. Denmark

== Births ==
- 21. January – Zygmunt Kukla, Polish international footballer (died 2016)
- 24 January – Heinz Flohe, German international footballer (died 2013)
- 31 January – Volkmar Groß, German international footballer (died 2014)
- 20 February – Tony Ackerman, English former professional footballer
- 24 February
  - Luis Galvan, Argentinian international footballer
  - Walter Smith, Scottish footballer and manager (died 2021)
- 5 March – Jan van Beveren, Dutch footballer (died 2011)
- 22 March – Bernard Dietz, German international footballer
- 28 March – Walter Balmer, Swiss international footballer (died 2010)
- 29 March – Roberto Abrussezze, Brazilian footballer
- 7 April – Pietro Anastasi, Italian footballer (died 2020)
- 12 April – Juan Álvarez, Mexican footballer (died 2025)
- 27 April – Josef Hickersberger, Austrian international footballer and coach
- 10 May – Shimon Charnuha, former Israeli footballer
- 17 May – Horst Köppel, Germann international footballer and manager
- 1 July – Ever Hugo Almeida, Uruguayan-Paraguayan football player and manager
- 15 August – Patrice Rio, French footballer
- 24 August – David Mobley, English professional footballer
- 30 August – Terry Bartlett, English former footballer
- 17 September – Karl Alber, German former footballer and politician
- 2 October – Trevor Brooking, English international footballer
- 20 November – Bob Glozier, English former footballer
- 7 December – Roland Hattenberger, Austrian international footballer
- 12 December – Colin Todd, English footballer and manager
- 18 December – Brian Kerry, English professional footballer
- 31 December – Sandy Jardine, Scottish international footballer and manager (died 2014)
