= 1985–86 Cypriot Cup =

Tournament details
- Country: Cyprus
- Dates: 4 December 1985 – 23 June 1986
- Teams: 41

Final positions
- Champions: Apollon (3rd title)
- Runners-up: APOEL

The 1985–86 Cypriot Cup was the 44th edition of the Cypriot Cup. A total of 41 clubs entered the competition. It began on 4 December 1985 with the preliminary round and concluded on 23 June 1986 with the final which was held at Tsirion Stadium. Apollon won their 3rd Cypriot Cup trophy after beating APOEL 2–0 in the final.

== Format ==
In the 1985–86 Cypriot Cup, participated all the teams of the Cypriot First Division, 13 of 14 teams from the Cypriot Second Division and all the teams of the Cypriot Third Division.

The competition consisted of six knock-out rounds. In the preliminary round each tie was played as a single leg and was held at the home ground of one of the two teams, according to the draw results. Each tie winner was qualifying to the next round. If a match was drawn, extra time was followed. If extra time was drawn, there was a replay at the ground of the team who were away for the first game. If the rematch was also drawn, then extra time was followed and if the match remained drawn after extra time the winner was decided by penalty shoot-out.

The next four rounds were played in a two-legged format, each team playing a home and an away match against their opponent. The team which scored more goals on aggregate, was qualifying to the next round. If the two teams scored the same number of goals on aggregate, then the team which scored more goals away from home was advancing to the next round.

If both teams had scored the same number of home and away goals, then extra time was following after the end of the second leg match. If during the extra thirty minutes both teams had managed to score, but they had scored the same number of goals, then the team who scored the away goals was advancing to the next round (i.e. the team which was playing away). If there weren't scored any goals during extra time, the qualifying team was determined by penalty shoot-out.

The cup winner secured a place in the 1986–87 European Cup Winners' Cup.

== Preliminary round ==
In the first preliminary draw, all 14 teams of the Cypriot Third Division and four teams from the Cypriot Second Division (last four of the league table of each group at the day of the draw) participated.

Before the start of 1985–86 season, the Cypriot Second Division club Orfeas Athienou was expelled from Cyprus Football Association after they were accused of bribing an opponent goalkeeper. So, play-off matches were played to determine which team would take Orfeas's place in the Cypriot Second Division. In the play-offs participated the two teams which were relegated from the 1984-85 Cypriot Second Division (Chalkanoras and Digenis Akritas Ypsona) and the third-placed team of the 1984-85 Cypriot Third Division, Ethnikos Assia. The play-offs were played at the same time along with Cypriot Second and Third Division, so the play-offs teams would play their matches later, depending on which division they would participate. So, the Third Division consisted of 13 teams, as one of the 14 teams would be promoted to the Second Division, after taking Orfeas's place. Digenis Akritas Ypsona was the play-offs winner, so they won their promotion to Cypriot Second Division.

According to Cypriot Cup regulations, in the preliminary round draw participated the 13 teams of the Cypriot Third Division and the five last placed teams of the Cypriot Second Division. The draw took place one day after play-offs were finished, so Digenis Akritas Ypsona which did not play any Cypriot Second Division match up to that day, was obviously one of the 5 last placed teams which participated in the preliminary round. Later, Orfeas Athienou's objection against Cyprus Football Association's original decision was accepted, so they eventually participated in the 1985–86 Cypriot Second Division and Digenis Akritas Ypsona participated to the 1985-86 Cypriot Third Division. But the Cypriot Cup already advanced, so Orfeas Athienou didn't participate in the competition. So, in the 1985–86 Cypriot Cup, eventually participated all the 14 teams of the Cypriot Third Division and the 13 of the 14 teams of the Cypriot second Division.

Team 1	Result	Team 2
(B) Orfeas Nicosia	3 - 2	Doxa Katokopias F.C. (B)
(B) Adonis Idaliou	2 - 2, 2 - 5	AEM Morphou (C)
(C) Onisilos Sotira	3 - 2	AEK Katholiki (C)
(C) AEK Kythreas	1 - 2	Kentro Neotitas Maroniton (C)
(C) APEP F.C.	0 - 1	Ethnikos Defteras (C)
(C) Chalkanoras Idaliou		Apollon Lympion (B)
(C) Neos Aionas Trikomou	0 - 1	ASO Ormideia (C)
(C) Digenis Akritas Morphou	2 - 0	Digenis Akritas Ipsona (C)
(C) Elpida Xylofagou	3 - 1	Ethnikos Assia F.C. (C)

== First round ==
14 clubs from the Cypriot First Division and the rest clubs from the Cypriot Second Division met the winners of the preliminary round ties:

Team 1	Agg.	Team 2	1st leg	2nd leg
(A) AEL Limassol	2 - 0	ENTHOI Lakatamia FC (B)	0 - 0	2 - 0^{1}
(B) Akritas Chlorakas	1 - 16	APOEL FC (A)	1 - 5	0 - 11
(A) Apollon Limassol	8 - 3	ASO Ormideia (C)	5 - 0	3 - 3
(A) Aris Limassol F.C.	4 - 3	Ethnikos Achna FC (B)	1 - 2	3 - 1
(C) Digenis Akritas Morphou	2 - 6	Evagoras Paphos (B)	0 - 2	2 - 4
(C) Elpida Xylofagou	1 - 5	Olympiakos Nicosia (A)	1 - 2	0 - 3
(A) EPA Larnaca FC	2 - 2 (a.)	Alki Larnaca F.C. (A)	2 - 2	0 - 0
(A) Ermis Aradippou	5 - 3	Kentro Neotitas Maroniton (C)	2 - 1	3 - 2
(B) Keravnos Strovolou FC	4 - 4 (a.)	Anagennisi Deryneia (B)	2 - 3	2 - 1
(B) Othellos Athienou F.C.	0 - 6	APOP Paphos (A)	0 - 2	0 - 4
(A) AC Omonia	9 - 1	Apollon Lympion (B)	4 - 1	5 - 0
(C) Onisilos Sotira	5 - 6	Omonia Aradippou (B)	4 - 1	1 - 5 (aet)
(B) PAEEK FC	2 - 2 (a.)	Orfeas Nicosia (B)	1 - 0	1 - 2
(A) Enosis Neon Paralimni FC	5 - 1	Ethnikos Defteras (C)	2 - 0	3 - 1
(A) Pezoporikos Larnaca	2 - 3	Anorthosis Famagusta FC (A)	1 - 2	1 - 1
(A) Nea Salamis Famagusta FC	9 - 1	AEM Morphou (C)	2 - 0	7 - 1

^{1}The THOI-AEL match was abandoned at 45' at 0–1. The match awarded 0–2 to AEL.

== Second round ==
Team 1	Agg.	Team 2	1st leg	2nd leg
(A) AEL Limassol	7 - 0	Ermis Aradippou (A)	3 - 0	4 - 0
(A) Alki Larnaca F.C.	1 - 2	Evagoras Paphos (B)	1 - 2	0 - 0
(A) Apollon Limassol	2 - 0	Aris Limassol F.C. (A)	1 - 0	1 - 0
(B) Omonia Aradippou	0 - 3	Anorthosis Famagusta FC (A)	0 - 1	0 - 2
(B) Anagennisi Deryneia	2 - 4	APOP Paphos (A)	2 - 1	0 - 3
(A) Olympiakos Nicosia	3 - 4	APOEL FC (A)	3 - 2	0 - 2
(B) PAEEK FC	1 - 6	Enosis Neon Paralimni FC (A)	0 - 3	1 - 3
(A) Nea Salamis Famagusta FC	2 - 2 (a.)	AC Omonia (A)	1 - 2	1 - 0

== Quarter-finals ==
Team 1	Agg.	Team 2	1st leg	2nd leg
(A) AEL Limassol	1 - 5	APOEL FC (A)	0 - 0	1 - 5
(A) Apollon Limassol	6 - 1	Enosis Neon Paralimni FC (A)	4 - 1	2 - 0
(A) APOP Paphos	2 - 1	Evagoras Paphos (B)	0 - 1	2 - 0
(A) AC Omonia	1 - 0	Anorthosis Famagusta FC (A)	0 - 0	1 - 0

== Semi-finals ==
Team 1	Agg.	Team 2	1st leg	2nd leg
(A) APOP Paphos	4 - 5	APOEL FC (A)	3 - 2	1 - 3
(A) AC Omonia	1 - 1 (a.)	Apollon Limassol (A)	1 - 1	0 - 0

== Final ==
23 June 1986

Apollon	2–0	APOEL
Kenny 56'; Sokratous 63'

Tsirion Stadium, Limassol

Cypriot Cup 1985–86 Winners
Apollon Limassol
3rd title

== Sources ==
- "1985/86 Cyprus Cup". Rec.Sport.Soccer Statistics Foundation. 2016-01-14.

== See also ==
- Cypriot Cup
- 1985–86 Cypriot First Division
