= 1986–87 Cypriot Third Division =

Cypriot Third Division
- Season: 1986–87
- Champions: Elpida Xylofagou (1st title)
- Promoted: Elpida Xylofagou; Ethnikos Defteras
- Relegated: APEY Ypsona; Dynamo Pervolion; AEK Kythreas

The 1986–87 Cypriot Third Division was the 16th season of the Cypriot third-level football league. Elpida Xylofagou won their 1st title.

== Format ==
Fourteen teams participated in the 1986–87 Cypriot Third Division. All teams played against each other twice, once at their home and once away. The team with the most points at the end of the season crowned champions. The first two teams were promoted to 1987–88 Cypriot Second Division. The last three teams were relegated to the 1987–88 Cypriot Fourth Division.

=== Point system ===
Teams received two points for a win, one point for a draw and zero points for a loss.

== League standings ==
Pos	Team	Pld	W	D	L	GF	GA	GD	Pts	Promotion or relegation
1	Elpida Xylofagou	26	16	5	5	39	20	+19	37	Promoted to 1987–88 Cypriot Second Division
2	Ethnikos Defteras	26	14	8	4	38	16	+22	36	Promoted to 1987–88 Cypriot Second Division
3	Ethnikos Assia FC	26	13	9	4	33	18	+15	35	
4	Digenis Akritas Morphou FC	26	11	7	8	24	21	+3	29	
5	Neos Aionas Trikomou	26	9	9	8	27	20	+7	27	
6	AEK Katholiki	26	8	11	7	29	27	+2	27	
7	AEM Morphou	26	8	10	8	20	18	+2	26	
8	OXEN Peristeronas	26	6	12	8	22	25	−3	24	
9	ASO Ormideia	26	8	8	10	29	36	−7	24	
10	Chalkanoras Idaliou	26	10	3	13	32	29	+3	23	
11	Kentro Neotitas Maroniton	26	7	7	12	40	44	−4	21	
12	APEY Ypsona	26	5	10	11	21	38	−17	20	Relegated to 1987–88 Cypriot Fourth Division
13	Dynamo Pervolion	26	6	6	14	17	36	−19	18	Relegated to 1987–88 Cypriot Fourth Division
14	AEK Kythreas	26	6	5	15	17	40	−23	17	Relegated to 1987–88 Cypriot Fourth Division

Rules for classification: 1) Points, 2) Goal differences, 3) Goal for

== Sources ==
- "Γ΄ κατηγορία". Philathlos (in Greek). 1987-06-22. p. 7.
- "Τελική Βαθμολογία". Phileleftheros (in Greek). 1987-05-11. p. 6.

== See also ==
- Cypriot Third Division
- 1986–87 Cypriot First Division
- 1986–87 Cypriot Cup
