= 1987–88 Cypriot Second Division =

Cypriot Second Division
- Season: 1987–88
- Champions: Keravnos (2nd title)
- Promoted: Keravnos; Omonia Ar.
- Relegated: Digenis Ip.; PAEEK FC; Othellos
- Matches played: 210
- Goals scored: 577 (2.75 per match)

The 1987–88 Cypriot Second Division was the 33rd season of the Cypriot second-level football league. Keravnos won their 2nd title.

== Format ==
Fifteen teams participated in the 1987–88 Cypriot Second Division. All teams played against each other twice, once at their home and once away. The team with the most points at the end of the season were crowned champions. The first two teams were promoted to 1988–89 Cypriot First Division. The last three teams were relegated to the 1988–89 Cypriot Third Division.

== Changes from previous season ==
Teams promoted to 1987–88 Cypriot First Division

- APEP
- Anagennisi Deryneia

Teams relegated from 1986–87 Cypriot First Division

- Omonia Aradippou
- Ermis Aradippou

Teams promoted from 1986–87 Cypriot Third Division

- Elpida Xylofagou
- Ethnikos Defteras

Teams relegated to 1987–88 Cypriot Third Division

- Orfeas Athienou
- Apollon Lympion

== League standings ==
Pos	Team	Pld	W	D	L	GF	GA	GD	Pts	Promotion or relegation
1	Keravnos (C, P)	28	18	7	3	52	21	+31	43	Promoted to Cypriot First Division
2	Omonia Aradippou (P)	28	18	6	4	54	23	+31	42	Promoted to Cypriot First Division
3	Evagoras Paphos	28	16	8	4	54	19	+35	40	
4	Orfeas Nicosia	28	12	9	7	48	32	+16	33	
5	Elpida Xylofagou	28	10	6	12	36	39	−3	26	
6	Onisilos Sotira	28	8	10	10	29	33	−4	26	
7	THOI Lakatamia	28	11	4	13	40	46	−6	26	
8	Doxa Katokopias	28	10	6	12	32	38	−6	26	
9	Ermis Aradippou	28	8	10	10	27	39	−12	26	
10	Adonis Idaliou	28	11	2	15	48	48	0	24	
11	Akritas Chlorakas	28	10	4	14	41	56	−15	24	
12	Ethnikos Defteras	28	9	5	14	40	39	+1	23	
13	Digenis Ipsona (R)	28	9	3	16	29	50	−21	21	Relegated to Cypriot Third Division
14	PAEEK FC (R)	28	6	8	14	23	45	−22	20	Relegated to Cypriot Third Division
15	Othellos Athienou (R)	28	7	6	15	24	49	−25	20	Relegated to Cypriot Third Division

Rules for classification: 1) Points, 2) Goal differences, 3) Goal for. Points system: Won=2 points, Drawn=1 point, Lost=0 points.
(C) Champions; (P) Promoted; (R) Relegated

== See also ==
- Cypriot Second Division
- 1987–88 Cypriot First Division
- 1987–88 Cypriot Cup

== Sources ==
- "1987/88 Cypriot Second Division". Rec.Sport.Soccer Statistics Foundation. 2016-01-14.
