= 1986–87 Cypriot Second Division =

Cypriot Second Division
- Season: 1986–87
- Champions: APEP FC (1st title)
- Promoted: APEP FC; Anagennisi Deryneia FC
- Relegated: Orfeas Athienou; Apollon Lympion

The 1986–87 Cypriot Second Division was the 32nd season of the Cypriot second-level football league. APEP FC won their 1st title.

== Format ==
Fifteen teams participated in the 1986–87 Cypriot Second Division. All teams played against each other twice, once at their home and once away. The team with the most points at the end of the season crowned champions. The first two teams were promoted to 1987–88 Cypriot First Division. The last two teams were relegated to the 1987–88 Cypriot Third Division.

== Changes from previous season ==
Teams promoted to 1986–87 Cypriot First Division

- Ethnikos Achna FC
- Omonia Aradippou

Teams promoted from 1985–86 Cypriot Third Division

- APEP FC
- Digenis Akritas Ipsona
- Onisilos Sotira

== League standings ==
Pos	Team	Pld	W	D	L	GF	GA	GD	Pts	Promotion or relegation
1	APEP FC (C, P)	28	19	5	4	53	25	+28	43	Promoted to Cypriot First Division
2	Anagennisi Deryneia FC (P)	28	16	9	3	56	21	+35	41	Promoted to Cypriot First Division
3	Orfeas Nicosia	28	17	6	5	52	25	+27	40	
4	Doxa Katokopias FC	28	16	5	7	37	23	+14	37	
5	Onisilos Sotira	28	13	7	8	44	33	+11	33	
6	Evagoras Paphos	18	15	1	2	46	31	+15	31	
7	Keravnos Strovolou FC	28	11	5	12	27	26	+1	27	
8	Akritas Chlorakas	28	10	6	12	36	47	−11	26	
9	ENTHOI Lakatamia FC	28	10	5	13	31	35	−4	25	
10	PAEEK FC	28	9	6	13	23	36	−13	24	
11	Othellos Athienou FC	28	6	12	10	28	34	−6	24	
12	Adonis Idaliou	28	7	9	12	31	46	−15	23	
13	Digenis Akritas Ipsona	28	8	5	15	31	46	−15	21	
14	Orfeas Athienou (R)	28	4	8	16	26	48	−22	16	Relegated to Cypriot Third Division
15	Apollon Lympion (R)	28	2	5	21	21	66	−45	9	Relegated to Cypriot Third Division

Rules for classification: 1) Points, 2) Goal differences, 3) Goal for. Points system: Won=2 points, Drawn=1 point, Lost=0 points.
(C) Champions; (P) Promoted; (R) Relegated

== See also ==
- Cypriot Second Division
- 1986–87 Cypriot First Division
- 1986–87 Cypriot Cup
