= 1986–87 Cypriot Fourth Division =

Cypriot Fourth Division
- Season: 1986–87
- Champions: Libanos Kormakiti; Achyronas Liopetriou; AEZ Zakakiou (1st title)
- Promoted: Libanos Kormakiti; Achyronas Liopetriou; AEZ Zakakiou
- Relegated: EAS Ayios Dhometios; Parnassos Strovolou; Proodos Kaimakliou; Marathonas Kato Varosha FC; Poseidon Larnacas; Ethnikos Latsion FC; APEP Pelendriou; Anagennisi Prosfigon; KN Kalou Choriou; Anorthosis Kato Polemidia

The 1986–87 Cypriot Fourth Division was the second season of the Cypriot fourth-level football league. The championship was split into three geographical groups, representing the Districts of Cyprus. The winners were:

- Nicosia-Keryneia Group: Libanos Kormakiti
- Larnaca-Famagusta Group: Achyronas Liopetriou
- Limassol-Paphos Group: AEZ Zakakiou

The three winners were promoted to the 1987–88 Cypriot Third Division. Ten teams were relegated to regional leagues.

== See also ==
- Cypriot Fourth Division
- 1986–87 Cypriot First Division
- 1986–87 Cypriot Cup
