= 1985–86 Cypriot Second Division =

Cypriot Second Division
- Season: 1985–86
- Champions: Ethnikos Achna FC (1st title)
- Promoted: Ethnikos Achna FC; Omonia Aradippou

The 1985–86 Cypriot Second Division was the 31st season of the Cypriot second-level football league. Ethnikos Achna FC won their 1st title.

== Format ==
Fourteen teams participated in the 1985–86 Cypriot Second Division. All teams played against each other twice, once at their home and once away. The team with the most points at the end of the season crowned champions. The first two teams were promoted to 1986–87 Cypriot First Division.

== Changes from previous season ==
Teams promoted to 1985–86 Cypriot First Division

- Ermis Aradippou FC
- APOP Paphos FC

Teams relegated from 1984–85 Cypriot First Division

- Omonia Aradippou
- Evagoras Paphos

Teams promoted from 1984–85 Cypriot Third Division

- Orfeas Athienou
- Othellos Athienou FC

Teams relegated to 1985–86 Cypriot Third Division

- Chalkanoras Idaliou
- Digenis Akritas Ipsona

== League standings ==
Pos	Team	Pld	W	D	L	GF	GA	GD	Pts	Promotion
1	Ethnikos Achna FC (C, P)	26	–	–	–	55	17	+38	36	Promoted to Cypriot First Division
2	Omonia Aradippou (P)	26	–	–	–	47	21	+26	35	Promoted to Cypriot First Division
3	Evagoras Paphos	26	–	–	–	36	23	+13	32	
4	Keravnos Strovolou FC	26	–	–	–	35	27	+8	32	
5	Othellos Athienou FC	26	–	–	–	34	29	+5	31	
6	Anagennisi Deryneia FC	26	–	–	–	45	34	+11	27	
7	ENTHOI Lakatamia FC	26	–	–	–	31	31	0	25	
8	Orfeas Nicosia	26	–	–	–	33	30	+3	24	
9	Doxa Katokopias FC	26	–	–	–	27	31	−4	24	
10	Akritas Chlorakas	26	–	–	–	22	30	−8	22	
11	Adonis Idaliou	26	–	–	–	26	40	−14	22	
12	PAEEK FC	26	–	–	–	25	39	−14	22	
13	Orfeas Athienou	26	–	–	–	30	48	−18	21	
14	Apollon Lympion	26	–	–	–	22	58	−36	11	

Rules for classification: 1) Points, 2) Goal differences, 3) Goal for. Points system: Won=2 points, Drawn=1 point, Lost=0 points.
(C) Champions; (P) Promoted

== See also ==
- Cypriot Second Division
- 1985–86 Cypriot First Division
- 1985–86 Cypriot Cup
