= 1948–49 Football League =

50th season of the Football League

The Football League
- Season: 1948–49
- Champions: Portsmouth

The 1948–49 season was the 50th completed season of The Football League.

== Final league tables ==
Beginning with the season 1894–95, clubs finishing level on points were separated according to goal average (goals scored divided by goals conceded), or more properly put, goal ratio. In case one or more teams had the same goal difference, this system favoured those teams who had scored fewer goals. The goal average system was eventually scrapped beginning with the 1976–77 season.

From the 1922–23 season, the bottom two teams of both Third Division North and Third Division South were required to apply for re-election.

== First Division ==
First Division
- Season: 1948–49
- Champions: Portsmouth; 1st English title
- Relegated: Preston North End; Sheffield United
- Matches: 462
- Goals: 1,303 (2.82 per match)
- Top goalscorer: Willie Moir (25 goals)

Portsmouth, the 1939 FA Cup winners, won their second major trophy by finishing as champions of the First Division, five points ahead of their nearest challengers Manchester United and Derby County. Portsmouth clinched the title on 23 April 1949 with three matches left to play.

The relegation battle was tighter than those of the previous two seasons. Sheffield United and Preston North End finished the season in the bottom two places, a single point behind Huddersfield Town and Middlesbrough. A mere five points separated the bottom 10 teams in the final table.

Pos	Team	Pld	W	D	L	GF	GA	GAv	Pts	Relegation
1	Portsmouth (C)	42	25	8	9	84	42	2.000	58	
2	Manchester United	42	21	11	10	77	44	1.750	53	
3	Derby County	42	22	9	11	74	55	1.345	53	
4	Newcastle United	42	20	12	10	70	56	1.250	52	
5	Arsenal	42	18	13	11	74	44	1.682	49	
6	Wolverhampton Wanderers	42	17	12	13	79	66	1.197	46	
7	Manchester City	42	15	15	12	47	51	0.922	45	
8	Sunderland	42	13	17	12	49	58	0.845	43	
9	Charlton Athletic	42	15	12	15	63	67	0.940	42	
10	Aston Villa	42	16	10	16	60	76	0.789	42	
11	Stoke City	42	16	9	17	66	68	0.971	41	
12	Liverpool	42	13	14	15	53	43	1.233	40	
13	Chelsea	42	12	14	16	69	68	1.015	38	
14	Bolton Wanderers	42	14	10	18	59	68	0.868	38	
15	Burnley	42	12	14	16	43	50	0.860	38	
16	Blackpool	42	11	16	15	54	67	0.806	38	
17	Birmingham City	42	11	15	16	36	38	0.947	37	
18	Everton	42	13	11	18	41	63	0.651	37	
19	Middlesbrough	42	11	12	19	46	57	0.807	34	
20	Huddersfield Town	42	12	10	20	40	69	0.580	34	
21	Preston North End (R)	42	11	11	20	62	75	0.827	33	Relegation to the Second Division
22	Sheffield United (R)	42	11	11	20	57	78	0.731	33	Relegation to the Second Division

Source: World Football
Rules for classification: 1) Points; 2) Goal average; 3) Goals scored
(C) Champions; (R) Relegated

=== Results ===
Home \ Away	ARS	AST	BIR	BLP	BOL	BUR	CHA	CHE	DER	EVE	HUD	LIV	MCI	MUN	MID	NEW	POR	PNE	SHU	STK	SUN	WOL
Arsenal		3–1	2–0	2–0	5–0	3–1	2–0	1–2	3–3	5–0	3–0	1–1	1–1	0–1	1–1	0–1	3–2	0–0	5–3	3–0	5–0	3–1
Aston Villa	1–0		0–3	2–5	2–4	3–1	4–3	1–1	1–1	0–1	3–3	2–1	1–0	2–1	1–1	2–4	1–1	2–0	4–3	2–1	1–1	5–1
Birmingham City	1–1	0–1		1–1	0–0	0–0	1–0	1–0	0–1	0–0	1–0	0–1	4–1	1–0	0–0	2–0	3–0	1–0	1–2	2–1	0–0	0–1
Blackpool	1–1	1–0	1–0		1–0	1–1	0–1	2–1	1–1	3–0	0–0	1–0	1–1	0–3	1–1	1–3	1–0	2–2	0–3	2–1	3–3	1–3
Bolton Wanderers	1–0	3–0	0–0	2–2		0–1	2–2	1–1	4–0	1–0	1–2	0–3	5–1	0–1	4–1	1–5	1–2	5–3	6–1	2–1	4–1	0–5
Burnley	1–1	1–1	2–2	2–0	3–0		0–0	3–0	3–1	1–0	1–2	0–2	1–0	0–2	0–0	0–3	2–1	1–0	2–0	1–3	3–1	0–0
Charlton Athletic	4–3	0–2	1–1	0–0	1–4	3–1		1–1	1–5	3–1	3–1	2–1	3–2	2–3	2–0	0–0	0–1	0–0	2–1	4–1	4–0	2–3
Chelsea	0–1	2–1	2–0	3–3	2–2	1–0	2–2		0–3	6–0	5–0	2–1	1–1	1–1	1–0	2–3	1–2	5–3	1–0	2–2	0–1	4–1
Derby County	2–1	2–2	1–0	3–1	1–0	2–0	5–1	2–1		3–2	4–1	3–0	2–0	1–3	2–0	2–4	1–0	1–0	2–1	4–1	2–2	3–2
Everton	0–0	1–3	0–5	5–0	1–0	2–1	1–1	2–1	0–1		2–0	1–1	0–0	2–0	3–1	3–3	0–5	4–1	2–1	2–1	1–0	1–0
Huddersfield Town	1–1	0–1	0–0	1–0	0–2	1–0	1–2	3–4	1–1	1–1		0–4	1–0	2–1	0–0	0–2	0–0	0–2	0–0	1–3	2–0	4–0
Liverpool	0–1	1–1	1–0	1–1	0–1	1–1	1–1	1–1	0–0	0–0	0–1		0–1	0–2	4–0	1–1	3–1	0–2	3–3	4–0	4–0	0–0
Manchester City	0–3	4–1	1–0	1–1	1–0	2–2	0–1	1–0	2–1	0–0	3–1	2–4		0–0	1–0	1–0	1–1	3–2	1–0	0–0	1–1	3–3
Manchester United	2–0	3–1	3–0	3–4	3–0	1–1	1–1	1–1	1–2	2–0	4–1	0–0	0–0		1–0	1–1	3–2	2–2	3–2	3–0	1–2	2–0
Middlesbrough	0–1	6–0	1–1	1–0	5–0	4–1	2–4	1–1	1–0	1–0	1–0	0–1	0–1	1–4		3–2	1–1	1–0	3–1	1–1	0–0	4–4
Newcastle United	3–2	2–1	1–0	3–1	1–1	1–1	2–0	2–2	3–0	1–0	2–4	1–0	0–0	0–1	1–0		0–5	2–5	3–2	2–2	2–1	3–1
Portsmouth	4–1	3–0	3–1	1–1	0–0	1–0	3–1	5–2	1–0	4–0	2–0	3–2	3–1	2–2	1–0	1–0		3–1	3–0	1–0	3–0	5–0
Preston North End	1–1	0–1	0–0	1–3	1–1	0–3	2–3	3–2	0–0	3–1	2–0	3–2	1–3	1–6	6–1	2–1	2–2		4–1	2–1	1–3	1–1
Sheffield United	1–1	0–1	4–0	3–2	1–1	0–0	2–0	2–1	3–1	1–1	0–0	1–2	0–2	2–2	1–0	0–0	3–1	3–2		2–2	2–5	1–1
Stoke City	1–0	4–2	2–1	3–2	4–0	2–1	2–2	4–3	4–2	1–0	1–3	3–0	2–3	2–1	3–0	1–1	0–1	2–0	0–1		0–0	2–1
Sunderland	1–1	0–0	1–1	2–2	2–0	0–0	1–0	3–0	2–1	1–1	0–1	0–2	3–0	2–1	1–0	1–1	1–4	0–0	2–0	1–1		3–3
Wolverhampton Wanderers	1–3	4–0	2–2	2–1	2–0	3–0	2–0	1–1	2–2	1–0	7–1	0–0	1–1	3–2	0–3	3–0	3–0	2–1	6–0	3–1	0–1	

Updated to match(es) played on unknown. Source: Ian Laschke: Rothmans Book of Football League Records 1888–89 to 1978–79. Macdonald and Jane’s, London & Sydney, 1980.
Legend: Blue = home team win; Yellow = draw; Red = away team win.

=== Maps ===
Locations of the Football League First Division London teams 1948–1949
Locations of the Football League First Division 1948–1949 teams

== Second Division ==
Second Division
- Season: 1948–49
- Champions: Fulham
- Promoted: Fulham; West Bromwich Albion
- Relegated: Nottingham Forest; Lincoln City
- Matches: 462
- Goals: 1,303 (2.82 per match)
- Top goalscorer: Charlie Wayman (32 goals)

Pos	Team	Pld	W	D	L	GF	GA	GAv	Pts	Qualification or relegation
1	Fulham (C, P)	42	24	9	9	77	37	2.081	57	Promotion to the First Division
2	West Bromwich Albion (P)	42	24	8	10	69	39	1.769	56	Promotion to the First Division
3	Southampton	42	23	9	10	69	36	1.917	55	
4	Cardiff City	42	19	13	10	62	47	1.319	51	
5	Tottenham Hotspur	42	17	16	9	72	44	1.636	50	
6	Chesterfield	42	15	17	10	51	45	1.133	47	
7	West Ham United	42	18	10	14	56	58	0.966	46	
8	Sheffield Wednesday	42	15	13	14	63	56	1.125	43	
9	Barnsley	42	14	12	16	62	61	1.016	40	
10	Luton Town	42	14	12	16	55	57	0.965	40	
11	Grimsby Town	42	15	10	17	72	76	0.947	40	
12	Bury	42	17	6	19	67	76	0.882	40	
13	Queens Park Rangers	42	14	11	17	44	62	0.710	39	
14	Blackburn Rovers	42	15	8	19	53	63	0.841	38	
15	Leeds United	42	12	13	17	55	63	0.873	37	
16	Coventry City	42	15	7	20	55	64	0.859	37	
17	Bradford (Park Avenue)	42	13	11	18	65	78	0.833	37	
18	Brentford	42	11	14	17	42	53	0.792	36	
19	Leicester City	42	10	16	16	62	79	0.785	36	
20	Plymouth Argyle	42	12	12	18	49	64	0.766	36	
21	Nottingham Forest (R)	42	14	7	21	50	54	0.926	35	Relegation to the Third Division South
22	Lincoln City (R)	42	8	12	22	53	91	0.582	28	Relegation to the Third Division North

Rules for classification: 1) Points; 2) Goal average; 3) Goals scored
(C) Champions; (P) Promoted; (R) Relegated

=== Results ===
Home \ Away	BAR	BLB	BPA	BRE	BRY	CAR	CHF	COV	FUL	GRI	LEE	LEI	LIN	LUT	NOT	PLY	QPR	SHW	SOU	TOT	WBA	WHU
Barnsley		1–1	0–0	1–2	3–2	1–1	0–1	1–1	1–1	2–1	1–1	3–1	2–0	1–2	4–0	0–0	4–0	4–0	3–0	4–1	2–0	2–3
Blackburn Rovers	5–3		2–3	2–1	1–2	2–1	0–2	2–0	1–0	3–3	0–0	2–0	7–1	4–1	2–1	2–1	2–0	2–1	1–2	1–1	0–0	0–0
Bradford Park Avenue	0–2	2–0		3–1	4–1	3–0	1–1	2–1	1–1	0–1	1–1	3–3	0–3	4–1	1–2	2–2	0–0	1–1	2–0	1–1	4–1	2–3
Brentford	0–0	0–1	1–0		8–2	1–1	1–1	2–2	0–0	2–0	1–3	1–2	2–1	2–0	2–1	2–2	0–3	2–1	0–0	1–1	0–0	0–0
Bury	4–2	3–1	2–1	1–2		0–3	2–2	0–2	2–0	5–1	3–1	1–2	3–1	3–1	1–1	1–1	0–0	2–1	1–0	1–1	4–0	2–0
Cardiff City	0–3	1–0	6–1	2–0	2–1		3–4	3–0	2–1	3–0	2–1	1–1	3–1	3–3	1–0	1–0	3–0	1–1	2–1	0–1	2–2	4–0
Chesterfield	3–2	0–0	2–3	0–1	4–0	0–2		0–0	0–1	0–3	3–1	1–1	3–1	1–0	2–1	0–0	2–1	1–1	1–0	1–0	0–0	0–0
Coventry City	4–0	0–1	2–0	2–1	2–1	0–1	0–2		1–0	4–1	4–1	1–2	1–0	2–0	1–2	1–1	1–1	3–4	2–2	2–0	1–0	1–0
Fulham	1–1	1–1	2–0	2–1	7–2	4–0	2–1	1–0		3–1	1–0	1–0	2–1	4–1	4–0	6–1	5–0	1–1	1–0	1–1	1–2	2–0
Grimsby Town	3–0	1–2	0–3	3–0	2–3	2–2	3–3	4–1	2–3		5–1	1–0	2–2	2–1	1–2	2–2	4–1	2–0	0–1	1–1	1–0	3–0
Leeds United	4–1	1–0	4–2	0–0	0–1	0–0	1–0	4–1	1–1	6–3		3–1	3–1	2–0	1–0	1–0	1–2	1–1	1–1	0–0	1–3	1–3
Leicester City	1–1	3–1	2–2	0–0	3–2	2–2	2–2	3–1	0–3	1–1	6–2		5–3	1–1	4–2	1–1	2–3	2–2	1–3	1–2	0–3	1–1
Lincoln City	0–1	3–0	3–6	3–1	1–1	0–0	2–2	1–0	0–3	2–3	0–0	2–0		4–4	1–3	1–2	0–0	3–1	1–2	0–0	0–3	4–3
Luton Town	1–0	2–0	0–1	2–1	1–0	3–0	1–0	2–0	1–3	1–1	0–0	1–1	6–0		4–3	3–1	0–0	2–1	1–1	1–1	0–1	0–1
Nottingham Forest	0–1	1–0	2–0	1–2	1–0	0–0	0–1	3–0	0–2	0–0	0–0	2–1	1–1	2–0		1–0	0–0	1–2	2–1	2–2	0–1	3–0
Plymouth Argyle	3–1	3–0	3–0	1–0	1–0	0–1	2–2	2–3	3–1	0–2	2–1	1–1	0–0	1–1	1–0		3–1	3–2	1–2	0–5	1–2	2–0
Queens Park Rangers	2–2	4–2	1–0	2–0	3–1	0–0	1–1	0–3	1–0	1–2	2–0	4–1	2–0	0–3	2–1	2–1		1–3	1–3	0–0	0–2	2–1
Sheffield Wednesday	1–1	3–0	2–1	0–0	1–2	1–1	0–0	2–1	1–2	4–1	3–1	0–1	2–2	0–0	2–1	2–1	2–0		2–0	3–1	2–1	3–0
Southampton	3–0	3–0	2–2	2–0	2–0	2–0	1–0	5–2	3–0	0–0	2–1	6–0	4–0	1–1	2–1	2–0	3–0	1–0		3–1	1–1	0–1
Tottenham Hotspur	4–1	4–0	5–1	2–0	3–1	0–1	4–0	4–0	1–1	5–2	2–2	1–1	1–2	2–1	2–1	3–0	1–0	3–2	0–1		2–0	1–1
West Bromwich Albion	2–0	2–1	7–1	2–0	2–3	2–0	0–0	1–0	1–2	5–2	1–0	2–1	5–0	2–1	2–1	3–0	1–1	1–0	2–0	2–2		2–1
West Ham United	2–0	2–1	4–1	1–1	2–1	3–1	1–2	2–2	1–0	1–0	3–2	4–1	2–2	0–1	0–5	3–0	2–0	2–2	1–1	1–0	1–0	

Updated to match(es) played on unknown. Source: Ian Laschke: Rothmans Book of Football League Records 1888–89 to 1978–79. Macdonald and Jane’s, London & Sydney, 1980.
Legend: Blue = home team win; Yellow = draw; Red = away team win.

=== Maps ===
Locations of the Football League Second Division London teams 1948–1949
Locations of the Football League Second Division 1948–1949 teams

== Third Division North ==
Football League Third Division North
- Season: 1948–49
- Champions: Hull City (2nd title)
- Failed re-election: none
- Matches: 462
- Goals: 1,301 (2.82 per match)
- Top goalscorer: Wally Ardron (Rotherham United), 29

Pos	Team	Pld	W	D	L	GF	GA	GAv	Pts	Promotion
1	Hull City (C, P)	42	27	11	4	93	28	3.321	65	Promotion to the Second Division
2	Rotherham United	42	28	6	8	90	46	1.957	62	
3	Doncaster Rovers	42	20	10	12	53	40	1.325	50	
4	Darlington	42	20	6	16	83	74	1.122	46	
5	Gateshead	42	16	13	13	69	58	1.190	45	
6	Oldham Athletic	42	18	9	15	75	67	1.119	45	
7	Rochdale	42	18	9	15	55	53	1.038	45	
8	Stockport County	42	16	11	15	61	56	1.089	43	
9	Wrexham	42	17	9	16	56	62	0.903	43	
10	Mansfield Town	42	14	14	14	52	48	1.083	42	
11	Tranmere Rovers	42	13	15	14	46	57	0.807	41	
12	Crewe Alexandra	42	16	9	17	52	74	0.703	41	
13	Barrow	42	14	12	16	41	48	0.854	40	
14	York City	42	15	9	18	74	74	1.000	39	
15	Carlisle United	42	14	11	17	60	77	0.779	39	
16	Hartlepools United	42	14	10	18	45	58	0.776	38	
17	New Brighton	42	14	8	20	46	58	0.793	36	
18	Chester	42	11	13	18	57	56	1.018	35	
19	Halifax Town	42	12	11	19	45	62	0.726	35	
20	Accrington Stanley	42	12	10	20	55	64	0.859	34	
21	Southport	42	11	9	22	45	64	0.703	31	Re-elected
22	Bradford City	42	10	9	23	48	77	0.623	29	Re-elected

Source: rsssf.com
(C) Champions; (P) Promoted

=== Results ===
Home \ Away	ACC	BRW	BRA	CRL	CHE	CRE	DAR	DON	GAT	HAL	HAR	HUL	MAN	NWB	OLD	ROC	ROT	SOU	STP	TRA	WRE	YOR
Accrington Stanley		1–1	6–0	2–1	3–1	2–0	3–2	2–0	1–2	1–0	1–2	1–2	1–1	5–1	1–1	0–0	2–3	3–1	2–1	0–2	0–1	2–1
Barrow	0–0		0–0	0–0	1–1	1–0	1–1	3–1	3–0	0–0	2–0	1–2	1–0	2–1	2–1	0–1	0–2	2–1	2–1	0–0	1–1	5–0
Bradford City	2–2	0–2		1–2	3–2	1–2	0–2	0–1	1–1	2–1	0–0	4–2	1–0	1–1	2–1	1–0	1–2	4–2	1–1	1–3	1–2	2–2
Carlisle United	4–1	2–0	3–2		2–1	6–2	0–2	3–0	2–1	0–0	0–0	1–1	3–1	2–2	2–0	1–1	1–8	4–2	2–1	2–2	3–2	3–3
Chester	3–0	4–1	3–0	2–1		1–1	1–2	1–2	1–1	0–1	0–0	0–2	1–1	2–0	2–2	2–1	1–1	2–0	2–0	2–2	2–0	4–1
Crewe Alexandra	2–0	0–1	2–1	3–0	1–0		3–1	0–0	2–1	0–0	3–0	0–0	3–1	2–1	0–4	1–2	0–3	1–0	3–3	2–0	1–0	2–0
Darlington	3–0	2–3	1–5	2–2	3–3	4–1		1–5	1–3	2–1	2–0	0–1	1–2	0–2	2–1	6–1	2–0	0–1	1–1	3–2	3–1	3–1
Doncaster Rovers	0–0	0–0	2–0	2–0	0–0	0–1	1–1		2–1	1–2	0–0	0–0	1–1	2–1	3–0	1–0	0–0	1–2	3–1	2–0	4–2	1–0
Gateshead	1–1	3–0	6–2	3–0	2–1	4–1	1–3	0–3		1–2	2–1	0–2	0–0	3–0	2–2	2–1	3–2	2–2	0–1	3–3	2–0	1–1
Halifax Town	1–0	1–0	1–1	3–4	1–2	0–0	0–3	1–0	2–2		2–0	2–4	2–2	0–2	3–1	2–1	2–0	0–1	0–1	0–1	2–0	1–2
Hartlepool	1–0	1–0	1–0	1–0	2–1	4–1	0–1	2–1	1–3	0–0		0–2	1–1	3–1	1–2	6–1	1–4	2–2	0–0	3–0	2–2	2–3
Hull City	3–1	3–0	2–0	3–0	3–2	5–0	0–1	0–1	2–0	6–0	2–0		4–0	4–1	6–0	1–1	3–2	5–1	6–1	2–0	3–0	2–3
Mansfield Town	2–0	2–0	1–0	2–0	1–0	5–1	2–2	2–2	1–1	2–1	1–0	1–1		2–0	3–2	2–0	1–2	1–1	4–0	0–0	1–2	3–0
New Brighton	1–3	3–1	1–0	2–0	1–1	2–1	1–0	0–1	2–2	2–0	1–1	0–0	1–0		0–1	1–2	0–1	0–1	0–2	2–1	2–0	3–1
Oldham Athletic	4–3	2–1	1–2	1–0	2–1	3–2	7–1	0–2	0–0	2–2	5–1	1–1	4–0	4–2		0–1	1–3	2–1	5–2	0–2	1–1	4–0
Rochdale	4–1	3–0	1–1	1–0	3–1	3–0	3–4	0–2	3–0	1–0	0–1	1–1	1–0	1–1	1–2		2–0	1–0	2–0	2–1	2–1	2–0
Rotherham United	1–0	2–2	2–0	1–1	2–1	6–1	4–3	2–0	1–0	4–0	2–1	0–0	1–0	1–1	2–1	3–1		1–0	2–1	7–0	1–3	2–1
Southport	3–0	0–0	2–1	2–2	2–1	0–0	1–3	0–2	0–3	2–3	1–2	0–0	1–1	0–1	0–1	3–1	1–3		1–0	2–3	3–0	0–2
Stockport County	2–1	1–2	5–2	2–0	1–1	4–0	2–0	5–1	3–1	3–1	4–0	0–0	2–0	1–0	1–2	2–2	0–1	0–0		4–1	1–0	1–1
Tranmere	2–2	2–0	1–0	2–1	1–1	2–2	2–1	2–0	1–1	2–2	0–2	1–2	1–0	0–1	1–1	0–0	2–1	1–0	0–0		0–2	0–0
Wrexham	1–0	1–0	5–0	4–0	1–0	2–2	4–3	2–0	1–4	2–1	1–0	0–2	1–1	2–1	1–1	2–0	0–4	2–0	0–0	0–0		3–3
York City	1–1	2–0	0–2	6–0	2–0	1–3	2–5	2–3	0–1	2–2	4–0	1–3	2–1	2–1	4–0	1–1	6–1	1–3	4–0	1–0	5–1	

Updated to match(es) played on unknown. Source: Ian Laschke: Rothmans Book of Football League Records 1888–89 to 1978–79. Macdonald and Jane’s, London & Sydney, 1980.
Legend: Blue = home team win; Yellow = draw; Red = away team win.

=== Maps ===
Locations of the Football League Third Division North teams 1948–1949

== Third Division South ==
Football League Third Division South
- Season: 1948–49
- Champions: Swansea Town (2nd title)
- Failed re-election: none
- Matches: 462
- Goals: 1,347 (2.92 per match)
- Top goalscorer: Doug McGibbon (Bournemouth & Boscombe Athletic), 30

Pos	Team	Pld	W	D	L	GF	GA	GAv	Pts	Promotion
1	Swansea Town (C, P)	42	27	8	7	87	34	2.559	62	Promotion to the Second Division
2	Reading	42	25	5	12	77	50	1.540	55	
3	Bournemouth & Boscombe Athletic	42	22	8	12	69	48	1.438	52	
4	Swindon Town	42	18	15	9	64	56	1.143	51	
5	Bristol Rovers	42	19	10	13	61	51	1.196	48	
6	Brighton & Hove Albion	42	15	18	9	55	55	1.000	48	
7	Ipswich Town	42	18	9	15	78	77	1.013	45	
8	Millwall	42	17	11	14	63	64	0.984	45	
9	Torquay United	42	17	11	14	65	70	0.929	45	
10	Norwich City	42	16	12	14	67	49	1.367	44	
11	Notts County	42	19	5	18	102	68	1.500	43	
12	Exeter City	42	15	10	17	63	76	0.829	40	
13	Port Vale	42	14	11	17	51	54	0.944	39	
14	Walsall	42	15	8	19	56	64	0.875	38	
15	Newport County	42	14	9	19	68	92	0.739	37	
16	Bristol City	42	11	14	17	44	62	0.710	36	
17	Watford	42	10	15	17	41	54	0.759	35	
18	Southend United	42	9	16	17	41	46	0.891	34	
19	Leyton Orient	42	11	12	19	58	80	0.725	34	
20	Northampton Town	42	12	9	21	51	62	0.823	33	
21	Aldershot	42	11	11	20	48	59	0.814	33	Re-elected
22	Crystal Palace	42	8	11	23	38	76	0.500	27	Re-elected

(C) Champions; (P) Promoted

=== Results ===
Home \ Away	ALD	B&BA	B&HA	BRI	BRR	CRY	EXE	IPS	LEY	MIL	NPC	NOR	NWC	NTC	PTV	REA	STD	SWA	SWI	TOR	WAL	WAT
Aldershot		0–0	1–1	0–0	1–5	3–0	1–2	2–0	1–1	5–0	1–2	3–1	4–1	0–1	0–1	0–6	1–0	1–2	1–2	1–3	0–1	0–0
Bournemouth & Boscombe Athletic	1–0		0–1	0–0	1–0	2–0	1–0	4–2	3–0	2–0	1–2	5–2	1–2	2–1	2–0	1–3	3–2	1–1	3–0	5–0	2–0	2–1
Brighton & Hove Albion	0–4	1–6		0–0	2–1	1–1	2–0	6–1	3–1	1–2	3–2	0–0	1–0	3–2	1–0	2–0	1–0	0–2	1–1	3–1	1–2	0–0
Bristol City	1–1	2–1	1–1		1–1	2–0	1–0	2–0	3–0	0–0	1–1	3–0	1–6	3–1	1–1	0–2	2–1	0–0	1–3	0–2	2–2	1–1
Bristol Rovers	0–2	4–0	0–0	3–1		1–0	3–1	1–6	2–3	2–0	3–1	1–0	2–2	3–2	4–1	4–1	0–0	1–1	1–1	1–0	3–0	3–1
Crystal Palace	2–1	2–1	0–2	4–0	1–0		1–1	1–1	2–1	1–1	0–1	2–2	1–1	1–5	1–1	0–1	2–1	1–1	1–1	0–1	1–3	3–1
Exeter City	3–3	2–3	1–1	1–1	2–1	3–1		1–3	3–1	3–0	1–2	5–1	4–1	3–1	2–1	1–2	0–0	1–1	3–1	2–0	2–1	2–1
Ipswich Town	4–1	1–0	2–2	2–0	0–1	3–2	2–2		2–2	1–0	5–1	4–2	1–2	3–2	4–1	3–2	1–3	2–0	4–2	5–1	3–2	1–2
Leyton Orient	1–2	1–2	0–3	3–1	1–1	1–1	5–2	1–1		2–2	5–2	0–3	0–3	3–1	2–0	0–1	2–0	3–1	1–1	3–1	1–1	1–0
Millwall	1–1	4–0	6–2	4–1	1–1	1–0	2–1	0–0	0–0		3–1	3–2	1–3	3–2	1–1	1–1	1–0	2–0	3–1	1–3	2–1	2–2
Newport County	0–2	1–2	1–1	0–2	2–1	5–0	0–2	3–0	3–2	1–2		2–0	4–3	3–3	2–2	1–1	4–2	2–5	4–1	1–2	1–1	1–1
Northampton Town	2–0	1–0	1–1	3–1	0–1	3–2	4–0	1–1	4–1	4–0	2–1		1–0	1–2	2–2	1–2	2–2	0–1	0–1	0–0	0–1	1–1
Norwich City	0–0	1–1	2–1	4–0	3–0	3–0	3–0	2–0	0–0	1–2	0–0	2–1		3–0	2–0	1–2	3–0	1–0	0–0	0–0	1–2	0–1
Notts County	2–0	2–3	1–1	2–1	4–1	5–1	9–0	9–2	2–1	1–3	11–1	2–0	2–1		2–1	1–0	0–0	1–1	1–2	5–0	2–0	4–0
Port Vale	3–0	0–2	3–4	4–2	2–0	0–0	1–1	1–2	3–0	1–0	1–2	1–0	0–0	1–0		3–0	0–2	0–2	2–0	3–1	0–2	3–1
Reading	2–0	4–2	6–1	2–1	1–0	5–1	2–0	2–1	3–0	2–0	4–1	1–0	2–1	1–4	1–2		2–1	0–2	0–0	4–0	1–0	3–1
Southend	1–0	0–0	0–0	1–0	0–1	0–1	0–0	1–1	2–2	2–1	0–1	0–1	2–2	3–2	0–0	0–0		0–0	3–4	1–1	2–0	0–1
Swansea Town	2–1	2–0	3–0	2–0	5–0	3–0	6–0	2–0	3–1	2–0	2–1	1–0	2–1	3–1	3–1	2–1	2–2		4–0	6–1	3–1	2–0
Swindon Town	3–1	2–2	0–0	2–1	1–1	1–0	1–1	4–0	1–1	2–0	5–2	2–2	3–3	3–0	0–2	1–1	2–1	1–0		1–1	2–1	1–0
Torquay United	2–2	1–1	1–1	0–2	0–2	2–0	2–1	1–1	7–1	2–1	4–0	3–0	2–1	3–1	0–0	4–2	0–3	0–4	3–1		5–1	3–1
Walsall	0–0	0–0	0–0	0–1	0–1	3–1	4–3	2–1	2–3	5–6	3–1	2–0	4–1	3–2	1–1	2–0	0–3	2–1	0–1	1–1		0–1
Watford	0–1	0–1	0–0	1–1	0–0	2–0	0–1	1–2	2–1	1–1	2–2	0–1	1–1	1–1	2–1	4–1	0–0	4–2	0–3	1–1	2–0	

Updated to match(es) played on unknown. Source: Ian Laschke: Rothmans Book of Football League Records 1888–89 to 1978–79. Macdonald and Jane’s, London & Sydney, 1980.
Legend: Blue = home team win; Yellow = draw; Red = away team win.

=== Maps ===
Locations of the Football League Third Division South London teams 1948–1949
Locations of the Football League Third Division South teams 1948–1949

== Attendances ==
=== Division One ===
#	Football club	Home games	Average attendance
1	Newcastle United	21	53,839
2	Arsenal FC	21	51,478
3	Manchester United	21	48,808
4	Aston Villa	21	47,320
5	Chelsea FC	21	46,362
6	Sunderland AFC	21	45,220
7	Everton FC	21	45,138
8	Liverpool FC	21	44,031
9	Wolverhampton Wanderers	21	43,690
10	Charlton Athletic	21	40,216
11	Manchester City	21	38,699
12	Birmingham City	21	38,453
13	Portsmouth FC	21	37,082
14	Sheffield United	21	34,387
15	Middlesbrough FC	21	34,292
16	Bolton Wanderers	21	34,113
17	Preston North End	21	33,226
18	Burnley FC	21	30,290
19	Stoke City	21	29,943
20	Derby County	21	29,798
21	Blackpool FC	21	24,882
22	Huddersfield Town	21	22,151

=== Division Two ===
#	Football club	Home games	Average attendance
1	Tottenham Hotspur FC	21	48,258
2	Cardiff City FC	21	35,091
3	Sheffield Wednesday FC	21	33,797
4	West Bromwich Albion FC	21	33,395
5	Leicester City FC	21	30,384
6	Fulham FC	21	29,327
7	Leeds United FC	21	29,318
8	Southampton FC	21	25,384
9	Nottingham Forest FC	21	24,175
10	West Ham United FC	21	23,354
11	Plymouth Argyle FC	21	22,820
12	Brentford FC	21	22,755
13	Blackburn Rovers FC	21	22,421
14	Coventry City FC	21	22,342
15	Queens Park Rangers FC	21	21,628
16	Barnsley FC	21	19,305
17	Luton Town FC	21	17,796
18	Grimsby Town FC	21	16,602
19	Bury FC	21	16,360
20	Lincoln City FC	21	15,890
21	Bradford Park Avenue AFC	21	14,983
22	Chesterfield FC	21	14,229

=== Division Three ===
#	Football club	Home games	Average attendance
1	Hull City AFC	21	36,760
2	Notts County FC	21	30,002
3	Millwall FC	21	24,629
4	Norwich City FC	21	24,325
5	Swansea City AFC	21	22,535
6	Brighton & Hove Albion FC	21	17,729
7	Bristol Rovers FC	21	17,539
8	Swindon Town FC	21	16,672
9	Bristol City FC	21	16,523
10	AFC Bournemouth	21	15,975
11	Oldham Athletic FC	21	15,893
12	Reading FC	21	15,588
13	Crystal Palace FC	21	14,870
14	Doncaster Rovers FC	21	13,842
15	Rotherham United FC	21	13,541
16	Ipswich Town FC	21	13,399
17	Leyton Orient FC	21	12,444
18	Port Vale FC	21	12,064
19	Newport County AFC	21	11,878
20	Mansfield Town FC	21	11,312
21	Watford FC	21	11,161
22	Carlisle United FC	21	11,129
23	Stockport County FC	21	10,916
24	Walsall FC	21	10,772
25	Southend United FC	21	10,500
26	Bradford City AFC	21	10,447
27	York City FC	21	10,412
28	Darlington FC	21	10,235
29	Exeter City FC	21	10,143
30	Wrexham AFC	21	9,563
31	Northampton Town FC	21	9,211
32	Halifax Town AFC	21	8,914
33	Hartlepool United FC	21	8,796
34	Rochdale AFC	21	8,616
35	Tranmere Rovers	21	8,307
36	Torquay United FC	21	7,939
37	Southport FC	21	7,637
38	Aldershot Town FC	21	7,351
39	Gateshead AFC	21	7,351
40	Crewe Alexandra FC	21	7,316
41	Chester City FC	21	6,959
42	Barrow AFC	21	6,939
43	New Brighton AFC	21	6,861
44	Accrington Stanley FC	21	6,001

== See also ==
- 1948-49 in English football
- 1948 in association football
- 1949 in association football
