= 1986–87 Cypriot Cup =

Tournament details
- Country: Cyprus
- Dates: 19 November 1986 – 20 June 1987
- Teams: 57

Final positions
- Champions: AEL (5th title)

The 1986–87 Cypriot Cup was the 45th edition of the Cypriot Cup. A total of 57 clubs entered the competition. It began on 19 November 1986 with the first preliminary round and concluded on 20 June 1987 with the final which was held at Tsirion Stadium. AEL Limassol won their 5th Cypriot Cup trophy after beating Apollon 1–0 in the final.

== Format ==
In the 1986–87 Cypriot Cup, participated all the teams of the Cypriot First Division, the Cypriot Second Division, the Cypriot Third Division and 12 of the 46 teams of the Cypriot Fourth Division.

The competition consisted of seven knock-out rounds. In the preliminary rounds each tie was played as a single leg and was held at the home ground of one of the two teams, according to the draw results. Each tie winner was qualifying to the next round. If a match was drawn, extra time was following. If extra time was drawn, there was a replay at the ground of the team who were away for the first game. If the rematch was also drawn, then extra time was following and if the match remained drawn after extra time the winner was decided by penalty shoot-out.

The next four rounds were played in a two-legged format, each team playing a home and an away match against their opponent. The team which scored more goals on aggregate, was qualifying to the next round. If the two teams scored the same number of goals on aggregate, then the team which scored more goals away from home was advancing to the next round.

If both teams had scored the same number of home and away goals, then extra time was following after the end of the second leg match. If during the extra thirty minutes both teams had managed to score, but they had scored the same number of goals, then the team who scored the away goals was advancing to the next round (i.e. the team which was playing away). If there weren't scored any goals during extra time, the qualifying team was determined by penalty shoot-out.

The cup winner secured a place in the 1987–88 European Cup Winners' Cup.

== First preliminary round ==
In the first preliminary draw, participated all the 14 teams of the Cypriot Third Division and 12 teams from the Cypriot Fourth Division (first four of the league table of each group at the day of the draw). Eight out of the 26 teams were drawn to qualify directly to the second preliminary round, without needing to play any match.

Team 1	Result	Team 2
(C) AEK Katholiki	3 - 0	ASO Ormideia (C)
(D) AOL Omonia Lakatamias	3 - 1	Elpida Xylofagou (C)
(C) Digenis Akritas Morphou	2 - 1	AEZ Zakakiou (D)
(D) Iraklis Gerolakkou	0 - 1	Chalkanoras Idaliou (C)
(C) Kentro Neotitas Maroniton	1 - 0	Anagennisi Prosfigon Lemesou (D)
(D) Libanos Kormakiti	0 - 1	Ethnikos Defteras (C)
(D) Olympos Xylofagou	0 - 2	APEY Ypsona (C)
(D) Rotsidis Mammari	1 - 0	Neos Aionas Trikomou (C)
(D) Zenonas Larnaca	1 - 0	OXEN Peristeronas (C)
(C) AEK Kythreas	Bye
(C) AEM Morphou	Bye
(D) Anagennisi Lythrodonta	Bye
(D) Anagennisi Mouttalou	Bye
(D) ATE PEK Parekklisias	Bye
(C) Dynamo Pervolion	Bye
(C) Ethnikos Assia F.C.	Bye
(D) Kimonas Xylotympou	Bye

== Second preliminary round ==
The 15 clubs of the Cypriot Second Division advanced directly to the second preliminary round and met the winners of the first preliminary round ties:

Team 1	Result	Team 2
(B) Adonis Idaliou	2 - 2 (aet), 1 - 0	Kentro Neotitas Maroniton (C)
(C) AEK Katholiki	2 - 1	Digenis Akritas Ipsona (B)
(C) AEK Kythreas	1 - 2	Evagoras Paphos (B)
(D) Anagennisi Mouttalou	0 - 1	AOL Omonia Lakatamias (D)
(B) APEP Limassol	3 - 0	AEM Morphou (C)
(B) Apollon Lympion	5 - 2	APEY Ypsona (C)
(D) ATE PEK Parekklisias	2 - 6	Ethnikos Defteras (C)
(B) Doxa Katokopias F.C.	1 - 1, 1 - 1 (4 - 5 p.)	Anagennisi Deryneia (B)
(B) ENTHOI Lakatamia FC	3 - 1 (aet)	Orfeas Nicosia (B)
(C) Ethnikos Assia F.C.	1 - 0	Orfeas Athienou (B)
(D) Zenonas Larnaca	0 - 0, 2 - 3	Dynamo Pervolion (C)
(B) Keravnos Strovolou FC	1 - 0	Digenis Akritas Morphou (C)
(D) Kimonas Xylotympou	0 - 1	Chalkanoras Idaliou (C)
(B) Onisilos Sotira	2 - 0	PAEEK FC (B)
(B) Othellos Athienou F.C.	1 - 3 (aet)	Akritas Chlorakas (B)
(D) Rotsidis Mammari	2 - 0	Anagennisi Lythrodonta (D)

== First round ==
The 16 clubs of the Cypriot First Division advanced directly to the first round and met the winners of the second preliminary round ties:

Team 1	Agg.	Team 2	1st leg	2nd leg
(B) Adonis Idaliou	1 - 11	Apollon Limassol (A)	0 - 4	1 - 7
(C) AEK Katholiki	2 - 11	Olympiakos Nicosia (A)	0 - 5	2 - 6
(A) AEL Limassol	5 - 1	Evagoras Paphos (B)	3 - 0	2 - 1
(B) Akritas Chlorakas	(a.) 1 - 1	Ethnikos Assia F.C. (C)	0 - 0	1 - 1
(D) AOL Omonia Lakatamias	2 - 17	AC Omonia (A)	1 - 7	1 - 10
(B) APEP Limassol	2 - 0	Dynamo Pervolion (C)	1 - 0	1 - 0
(A) APOEL FC	1 - 0	Anorthosis Famagusta FC (A)	0 - 0	1 - 0
(A) APOP Paphos	8 - 0	Ethnikos Defteras (C)	6 - 0	2 - 0
(A) Aris Limassol F.C.	10 - 0	Anagennisi Deryneia (B)	4 - 0	6 - 0
(A) Enosis Neon Paralimni FC	2 - 1	Alki Larnaca F.C. (A)	1 - 0	1 - 1
(A) EPA Larnaca FC	0 - 0 (2 - 3 p.)	Pezoporikos Larnaca (A)	0 - 0	0 - 0
(A) Ermis Aradippou	9 - 4	Apollon Lympion (B)	5 - 1	4 - 3
(A) Ethnikos Achna FC	8 - 5	Chalkanoras Idaliou (C)	5 - 1	3 - 4
(B) Keravnos Strovolou FC	0 - 4	ENTHOI Lakatamia FC (B)	0 - 2	0 - 2
(A) Nea Salamis Famagusta FC	2 - 0	Rotsidis Mammari (D)	1 - 0	1 - 0
(A) Omonia Aradippou	1 - 3	Onisilos Sotira (B)	1 - 1	0 - 2

== Second round ==
Team 1	Agg.	Team 2	1st leg	2nd leg
(A) AEL Limassol	6 - 2	Ethnikos Achna FC (A)	3 - 0	3 - 2
(B) Akritas Chlorakas	3 - 6	Onisilos Sotira (B)	3 - 1	0 - 5
(A) APOEL FC	2 - 0	AC Omonia (A)	1 - 0	1 - 0
(A) APOP Paphos	1 - 5	Apollon Limassol (A)	0 - 2	1 - 3
(A) Enosis Neon Paralimni FC	2 - 0	Ermis Aradippou (A)	0 - 0	2 - 0
(A) Nea Salamis Famagusta FC	3 - 1	ENTHOI Lakatamia FC (B)	3 - 0	0 - 1
(A) Olympiakos Nicosia	(a.) 2 - 2	Aris Limassol F.C. (A)	0 - 0	2 - 2
(A) Pezoporikos Larnaca	3 - 0	APEP Limassol (B)	2 - 0	1 - 0

== Quarter-finals ==
Team 1	Agg.	Team 2	1st leg	2nd leg
(A) Apollon Limassol	(a.) 5 - 5	APOEL FC (A)	1 - 2	4 - 3
(A) Nea Salamis Famagusta FC	3 - 1	Onisilos Sotira (B)	3 - 1	0 - 0
(A) Olympiakos Nicosia	(a.) 4 - 4	Enosis Neon Paralimni FC (A)	2 - 1	2 - 3
(A) Pezoporikos Larnaca	0 - 1	AEL Limassol (A)	0 - 0	0 - 1

== Semi-finals ==
Team 1	Agg.	Team 2	1st leg	2nd leg
(A) AEL Limassol	4 - 2	Nea Salamis Famagusta FC (A)	3 - 1	1 - 1
(A) Apollon Limassol	6 - 3	Olympiakos Nicosia (A)	5 - 2	1 - 1

== Final ==
20 June 1987

AEL	1–0	Apollon

Tsirion Stadium, Limassol

Cypriot Cup 1986–87 Winners
AEL Limassol
5th title

== Sources ==
- "1986/87 Cyprus Cup". Rec.Sport.Soccer Statistics Foundation. 2016-01-14.

== See also ==
- Cypriot Cup
- 1986–87 Cypriot First Division
