= 1949 in association football =

The following are the football (soccer) events of the year 1949 throughout the world.

== Events ==
- March 31 - The 1948/49 Albanian First Division championship is annulled by the Albanian Sports Federation.

== Winners club national championship ==
=== Argentina ===
- Racing Club

=== Austria ===
- Austria Vienna

=== Chile ===
- Universidad Católica

=== Colombia ===
- Millonarios

=== Costa Rica ===
- Alajuelense

=== Egypt ===
- Al Ahly

=== England ===
for fuller coverage see 1948-49 in English football

- First Division: Portsmouth
- Second Division: Fulham
- Third Division North: Hull City
- Third Division South: Swansea City
- FA Cup: Wolves

=== France ===
- Stade de Reims

=== Hong Kong ===
- South China AA

=== Iceland ===
- KR

=== Italy ===
- Torino F.C.

=== Mexico ===
- León

=== Paraguay ===
- Club Guaraní

=== Romania ===
- Divizia A: ICO Oradea
- Divizia B: CFR Sibiu, Dinamo B București
- Cupa României: CSCA București

=== Scotland ===
for fuller coverage see 1948-49 in Scottish football

- League Division A: Rangers
- League Division B: Raith Rovers
- League Division C: Stirling Albion
- Scottish Cup: Rangers
- Scottish League Cup: Rangers

=== Spain ===
- U.D. Las Palmas

=== Switzerland ===
- FC Lugano

=== Turkey ===
- Ankaragücü

=== Uruguay ===
- Peñarol

=== USSR ===
- Dynamo Moscow

=== West-Germany ===
- VfR Mannheim

== International tournaments ==
- 1949 British Home Championship (October 9, 1948 – April 9, 1949)

Scotland

- 1949 South American Championship (April 3 – May 11, 1949)

Brazil

== Births ==
- January 1 – Ali Kadhim, Iraqi international striker (d. 2018)
- January 4 – Mick Mills, English footballer and manager
- January 5 – Dick Huntley, English professional footballer
- January 16 – Len Tomkins, English former footballer
- January 27 – Per Røntved, Danish international footballer
- February 18 – Petre Varodi, Romanian former footballer
- April 16 – Claude Papi, French international footballer (died 1983)
- June 7 – Lou Macari, Scottish international footballer
- June 21 – John Taylor, English club footballer
- August 26 – Alberto Cardaccio, Uruguayan international footballer (died 2015)
- September 5 – Ray Booth, Welsh former professional footballer
- September 18 – Peter Shilton, English international footballer
- September 25 – Jean Petit, French international footballer
- November 11 – Safet Berisha, Albanian international footballer (died 2016)
- November 22 – Reiner Geye, German international footballer (died 2002)
- December 19 – Christian Dalger, French international footballer

== Deaths ==
- May 4 – Valerio Bacigalupo, Italian goalkeeper (born 1924)
- May 12 – Walter Berg, German footballer (born 1916)
