= 1984–85 Cypriot Cup =

Tournament details
- Country: Cyprus
- Dates: 18 November 1984 – 22 June 1985
- Teams: 43

Final positions
- Champions: AEL (4th title)
- Runners-up: EPA

The 1984–85 Cypriot Cup was the 43rd edition of the Cypriot Cup. A total of 43 clubs entered the competition. It began on 18 November 1984 with the preliminary round and concluded on 22 June 1985 with the final which was held at Makario Stadium. AEL won their 4th Cypriot Cup trophy by beating EPA 1–0 in the final.

== Format ==
In the 1984–85 Cypriot Cup, participated all the teams of the Cypriot First Division, the Cypriot Second Division and the Cypriot Third Division.

The competition consisted of six knock-out rounds. In the preliminary round each tie was played as a single leg and was held at the home ground of one of the two teams, according to the draw results. Each tie winner was qualifying to the next round. If a match was drawn, extra time was following. If extra time was drawn, there was a replay at the ground of the team who were away for the first game. If the rematch was also drawn, then extra time was following and if the match remained drawn after extra time the winner was decided by penalty shoot-out.

The next four rounds were played in a two-legged format, each team playing a home and an away match against their opponent. The team which scored more goals on aggregate, was qualifying to the next round. If the two teams scored the same number of goals on aggregate, then the team which scored more goals away from home was advancing to the next round.

If both teams had scored the same number of home and away goals, then extra time was following after the end of the second leg match. If during the extra thirty minutes both teams had managed to score, but they had scored the same number of goals, then the team who scored the away goals was advancing to the next round (i.e. the team which was playing away). If there weren't scored any goals during extra time, the qualifying team was determined by penalty shoot-out.

The cup winner secured a place in the 1985–86 European Cup Winners' Cup.

== Preliminary round ==
In the first preliminary draw, participated all the 16 teams of the Cypriot Third Division and 8 of the 14 teams of the Cypriot Second Division (last eight of the league table of each group at the day of the draw).

Team 1	Result	Team 2
(C) APEP F.C.	2 - 3	Apollon Lympion (B)
(C) ASO Ormideia	0 - 1	Othellos Athienou F.C. (C)
(C) Digenis Akritas Morphou	2 - 1	Elpida Xylofagou (C)
(C) AEK Kythreas	0 - 1	Doxa Katokopias F.C. (B)
(B) Chalkanoras Idaliou	4 - 0	Ethnikos Defteras (C)
(C) Iraklis Gerolakkou	1 - 0	ENTHOI Lakatamia FC (B)
(B) Adonis Idaliou	2 - 3	Kentro Neotitas Maroniton (C)
(C) Neos Aionas Trikomou	3 - 1	Akritas Chlorakas (B)
(C) Onisilos Sotira	3 - 1	Digenis Akritas Ipsona (B)
(C) Orfeas Athienou	3 - 0	Keravnos Strovolou FC (B)
(C) OXEN Peristeronas	1 - 0	Ethnikos Assia F.C. (C)
(C) ASIL Lysi	1 - 3	AEM Morphou (C)

== First round ==
14 clubs from the Cypriot First Division and the rest clubs from the Cypriot Second Division met the winners of the preliminary round ties:

Team 1	Agg.	Team 2	1st leg	2nd leg
(A) Apollon Limassol	1 - 2	APOEL FC (A)	1 - 1	0 - 1
(B) APOP Paphos	3 - 2	Kentro Neotitas Maroniton (C)	3 - 0	0 - 2
(A) Omonia Aradippou	3 - 2	Chalkanoras Idaliou (B)	1 - 1	2 - 1
(A) Aris Limassol F.C.	1 - 2	Alki Larnaca F.C. (A)	1 - 0	0 - 2
(B) Ethnikos Achna FC	(a.) 3 - 3	Evagoras Paphos (A)	1 - 0	2 - 3
(B) Anagennisi Deryneia	11 - 1	OXEN Peristeronas (C)	5 - 1	6 - 0
(B) Ermis Aradippou	7 - 2	Neos Aionas Trikomou (C)	3 - 0	4 - 2
(C) Iraklis Gerolakkou	2 - 4	EPA Larnaca FC (A)	2 - 2	0 - 2
(B) Apollon Lympion	(a.) 2 - 2	AEM Morphou (C)	1 - 0	1 - 2
(C) Othellos Athienou F.C.	1 - 2	AC Omonia (A)	1 - 2	0 - 0
(A) Olympiakos Nicosia	2 - 4	AEL Limassol (A)	2 - 3	0 - 1
(C) Onisilos Sotira	2 - 13	Pezoporikos Larnaca (A)	2 - 5	0 - 8
(C) Orfeas Athienou	1 - 2	Doxa Katokopias F.C. (B)	1 - 2	0 - 0
(B) Orfeas Nicosia	0 - 0 (4 - 3 p.)	Anorthosis Famagusta FC (A)	0 - 0	0 - 0
(B) PAEEK FC	12 - 2	Digenis Akritas Morphou (C)	8 - 0	4 - 2
(A) Enosis Neon Paralimni FC	1 - 1 (3 - 4 p.)	Nea Salamis Famagusta FC (A)	1 - 0	0 - 1

== Second round ==
Team 1	Agg.	Team 2	1st leg	2nd leg
(A) AEL Limassol	4 - 2	Anagennisi Deryneia (B)	4 - 1	0 - 1
(A) Alki Larnaca F.C.	5 - 0	Omonia Aradippou (A)	5 - 0	0 - 0
(B) APOP Paphos	1 - 3	EPA Larnaca FC (A)	1 - 0	0 - 3
(B) Ethnikos Achna FC	1 - 2	Ermis Aradippou (B)	0 - 1	1 - 1
(B) Doxa Katokopias F.C.	0 - 1	PAEEK FC (B)	0 - 0	0 - 1
(A) AC Omonia	10 - 0	Apollon Lympion (B)	7 - 0	3 - 0
(B) Orfeas Nicosia	2 - 7	APOEL FC (A)	1 - 2	1 - 5
(A) Nea Salamis Famagusta FC	6 - 5	Pezoporikos Larnaca (A)	3 - 4	3 - 1

== Quarter-finals ==
Team 1	Agg.	Team 2	1st leg	2nd leg
(A) AEL Limassol	2 - 1	Alki Larnaca F.C. (A)	1 - 0	1 - 1
(A) EPA Larnaca FC	4 - 0	Nea Salamis Famagusta FC (A)	3 - 0	1 - 0
(A) AC Omonia	5 - 4	APOEL FC (A)	3 - 1	2 - 3
(B) PAEEK FC	2 - 1	Ermis Aradippou (B)	1 - 0	1 - 1

== Semi-finals ==
Team 1	Agg.	Team 2	1st leg	2nd leg
(A) AEL Limassol	5 - 1	PAEEK FC (B)	3 - 0	2 - 1
(A) EPA Larnaca FC	5 - 2	AC Omonia (A)	5 - 1	0 - 1

== Final ==
22 June 1985

AEL Limassol	1–0	EPA Larnaca
Pelendritis 10'

Makario Stadium, Nicosia

Cypriot Cup 1984–85 Winners
AEL Limassol
4th title

== Sources ==
- "1984/85 Cyprus Cup". Rec.Sport.Soccer Statistics Foundation. 2016-01-14.

== See also ==
- Cypriot Cup
- 1984–85 Cypriot First Division
