= 1984–85 Cypriot Second Division =

Cypriot Second Division
- Season: 1984–85
- Champions: Ermis Aradippou FC (2nd title)
- Promoted: Ermis Aradippou FC; Omonia Aradippou
- Relegated: Chalkanoras Idaliou; Digenis Akritas Ipsona

The 1984–85 Cypriot Second Division was the 30th season of the Cypriot second-level football league. Ermis Aradippou FC won their 2nd title.

== Format ==
Fourteen teams participated in the 1984–85 Cypriot Second Division. All teams played against each other twice, once at their home and once away. The team with the most points at the end of the season crowned champions. The first two teams were promoted to 1985–86 Cypriot First Division. The last two teams were relegated to the 1985–86 Cypriot Third Division.

== Changes from previous season ==
Teams promoted to 1984–85 Cypriot First Division

- Olympiakos Nicosia
- Evagoras Paphos

Teams relegated from 1983–84 Cypriot First Division

- Ethnikos Achna FC
- Ermis Aradippou FC

Teams promoted from 1983–84 Cypriot Third Division

- Adonis Idaliou
- Akritas Chlorakas

Teams relegated to 1984–85 Cypriot Third Division

- AEM Morphou
- Kentro Neotitas Maroniton

== League standings ==
Pos	Team	Pld	W	D	L	GF	GA	GD	Pts	Promotion or relegation
1	Ermis Aradippou FC (C, P)	26	–	–	–	43	15	+28	41	Promoted to Cypriot First Division
2	APOP Paphos FC (P)	26	–	–	–	67	24	+43	39	Promoted to Cypriot First Division
3	Ethnikos Achna FC	26	–	–	–	59	29	+30	36	
4	Orfeas Nicosia	26	–	–	–	40	33	+7	30	
5	Doxa Katokopias FC	26	–	–	–	39	36	+3	25	
6	PAEEK FC	26	–	–	–	27	30	−3	25	
7	Anagennisi Deryneia FC	26	–	–	–	35	41	−6	25	
8	Adonis Idaliou	26	–	–	–	35	37	−2	23	
9	Keravnos Strovolou FC	26	–	–	–	26	39	−13	23	
10	Akritas Chlorakas	26	–	–	–	30	45	−15	21	
11	ENTHOI Lakatamia FC	26	–	–	–	25	41	−16	21	
12	Apollon Lympion	26	–	–	–	19	27	−8	20	
13	Chalkanoras Idaliou (R)	26	–	–	–	20	43	−23	20	Relegated to Cypriot Third Division
14	Digenis Akritas Ipsona (R)	26	–	–	–	21	46	−25	15	Relegated to Cypriot Third Division

Rules for classification: 1) Points, 2) Goal differences, 3) Goal for. Points system: Won=2 points, Drawn=1 point, Lost=0 points.
(C) Champions; (P) Promoted; (R) Relegated

== See also ==
- Cypriot Second Division
- 1984–85 Cypriot First Division
- 1984–85 Cypriot Cup
