= David Mobley =

David Mobley may refer to:

- David Mobley (golfer), American golfer
- David Mobley (footballer) (born 1948), English footballer
- David Mobley (band director (no page)

== See also ==
- David Morley (disambiguation)
