= 1987–88 Cypriot Cup =

Tournament details
- Country: Cyprus
- Dates: 7 November 1987 – 26 June 1988
- Teams: 65

Final positions
- Champions: Omonia (8th title)

The 1987–88 Cypriot Cup was the 46th edition of the Cypriot Cup. A total of 65 clubs entered the competition. It began on 7 November 1987 with the first preliminary round and concluded on 26 June 1988 with the final which was held at Tsirion Stadium. Omonia won their 8th Cypriot Cup trophy after beating AEL 2–1 in the final.

== Format ==
In the 1987–88 Cypriot Cup, participated all the teams of the Cypriot First Division, the Cypriot Second Division, the Cypriot Third Division and 20 of the 42 teams of the Cypriot Fourth Division.

The competition consisted of seven knock-out rounds. In the first preliminary round each tie was played as a single leg and was held at the home ground of one of the two teams, according to the draw results. Each tie winner was qualifying to the next round. If a match was drawn, extra time was following. If extra time was drawn, the winner was decided by penalty shoot-out.

In the second preliminary round each tie was played as a single leg and was held at the home ground of one of the two teams, according to the draw results. Each tie winner was qualifying to the next round. If a match was drawn, extra time was following. If extra time was drawn, there was a replay at the ground of the team who were away for the first game. If the rematch was also drawn, then extra time was following and if the match remained drawn after extra time the winner was decided by penalty shoot-out.

The next four rounds were played in a two-legged format, each team playing a home and an away match against their opponent. The team which scored more goals on aggregate, was qualifying to the next round. If the two teams scored the same number of goals on aggregate, then the team which scored more goals away from home was advancing to the next round.

If both teams had scored the same number of home and away goals, then extra time was following after the end of the second leg match. If during the extra thirty minutes both teams had managed to score, but they had scored the same number of goals, then the team who scored the away goals was advancing to the next round (i.e. the team which was playing away). If there weren't scored any goals during extra time, the qualifying team was determined by penalty shoot-out.

The cup winner secured a place in the 1988–89 European Cup Winners' Cup.

== First preliminary round ==
All the 14 clubs of the Cypriot Third Division and 20 clubs from the Cypriot Fourth Division (6 first of league table of each group the day of draw and two best 7th place of all groups) participated in the first preliminary round.

Team 1	Result	Team 2
(C) AEK Katholiki	3–0	OXEN Peristeronas (C)
(C) AEZ Zakakiou	2 – 2 (4 – 2 p.)	AEM Morphou (C)
(D) APEAN Ayia Napa	2–0	Rotsidis Mammari (D)
(D) APOP Palechoriou	0–2	Ethnikos Assia F.C. (C)
(C) ASO Ormideia	1–0	Achyronas Liopetriou (C)
(D) ATE PEK Parekklisias	1–2	MEAP Nisou (D)
(C) Chalkanoras Idaliou	7–5	Olimpiada Neapolis FC (D)
(D) Digenis Agiou Nikolaou	2–1	Libanos Kormakiti (C)
(C) Digenis Akritas Morphou	7–1	Kimonas Xylotympou (D)
(D) ENAD	3 – 3 (4 – 3 p.)	Tsaggaris Peledriou (D)
(D) Enosis Kokkinotrimithia	1–2	AMEAN Agiou Nikolaou (D)
(D) Iraklis Gerolakkou	3–2	Kentro Neotitas Maroniton (C)
(D) Olympias Frenarou	1–3	Elia Lythrodonta (D)
(D) Olympos Acheritou	1–3	Neos Aionas Trikomou (C)
(D) Olympos Xylofagou	1 – 1 (5 – 4 p.)	Triptolemus Evrychou (D)
(C) Orfeas Athienou	4–1	Apollon Lympion (C)
(D) Th.O.I. Avgorou FC	3–1	AOL Omonia Lakatamias (D)

== Second preliminary round ==
The 15 clubs of the Cypriot Second Division advanced directly to the second preliminary round and met the winners of the first preliminary round ties:

Team 1	Result	Team 2
(B) Adonis Idaliou	0–1	Omonia Aradippou (B)
(C) AEZ Zakakiou	5 – 1 (aet)	ENTHOI Lakatamia FC (B)
(D) APEAN Ayia Napa	3–1	PAEEK FC (B)
(C) Chalkanoras Idaliou	6–0	Orfeas Athienou (C)
(B) Doxa Katokopias F.C.	3–1	Othellos Athienou F.C. (B)
(B) Elpida Xylofagou	1 – 1, 0 – 1	ASO Ormideia (C)
(D) ENAD	2–3	AMEAN Agiou Nikolaou (D)
(B) Ermis Aradippou	0–1	Digenis Akritas Ipsona (B)
(B) Ethnikos Defteras	0–1	Keravnos Strovolou FC (B)
(B) Evagoras Paphos	3–0	AEK Katholiki (C)
(D) Iraklis Gerolakkou	0–1	Digenis Akritas Morphou (C)
(D) MEAP Nisou	4–2	Akritas Chlorakas (B)
(D) Olympos Xylofagou	2–1	Elia Lythrodonta (D)
(B) Onisilos Sotira	2–1	Ethnikos Assia F.C. (C)
(B) Orfeas Nicosia	1–0	Neos Aionas Trikomou (C)
(D) Th.O.I. Avgorou FC	1–3	Digenis Agiou Nikolaou (D)

== First round ==
The 16 clubs of the Cypriot First Division advanced directly to the first round and met the winners of the second preliminary round ties:

Team 1	Agg.	Team 2	1st leg	2nd leg
(A) Alki Larnaca F.C.	2–4	Evagoras Paphos (B)	2–1	0–3
(D) AMEAN Agiou Nikolaou	4–5	Olympos Xylofagou (D)	2–1	2–4
(A) Anagennisi Deryneia	1–3	AC Omonia (A)	1–1	0–2
(A) Anorthosis Famagusta FC	5–0	Doxa Katokopias F.C. (B)	3–0	2–0
(D) APEAN Ayia Napa	2–14	Enosis Neon Paralimni FC (A)	2–7	0–7
(A) APEP Limassol	2 – 2 (3 – 2 p.)	Digenis Akritas Ipsona (B)	1–1	1–1
(A) APOEL FC	14–1	Digenis Agiou Nikolaou (D)	11–0	3–1
(A) Apollon Limassol	15–1	MEAP Nisou (D)	9–0	6–1
(C) ASO Ormideia	2–13	Ethnikos Achna FC (A)	1–6	1–7
(C) Digenis Akritas Morphou	1–3	Chalkanoras Idaliou (C)	0–2	1–1
(B) Keravnos Strovolou FC	1–2	EPA Larnaca FC (A)	1–0	0–2
(A) Nea Salamis Famagusta FC	18–2	AEZ Zakakiou (C)	12–0	6–2
(A) Olympiakos Nicosia	3–2	Aris Limassol F.C. (A)	1–1	2–1
(B) Onisilos Sotira	1–7	AEL Limassol (A)	0–4	1–3
(B) Orfeas Nicosia	3–2	Omonia Aradippou (B)	1–0	2–2
(A) Pezoporikos Larnaca	1 – 1 (4 – 5 p.)	APOP Paphos (A)	1–0	0–1

== Second round ==
Team 1	Agg.	Team 2	1st leg	2nd leg
(A) Anorthosis Famagusta FC	0–5	AEL Limassol (A)	0–1	0–4
(A) APEP Limassol	2–6	Nea Salamis Famagusta FC (A)	2–1	0–5
(A) APOEL FC	4–2	Apollon Limassol (A)	2–1	2–1
(A) APOP Paphos	4–2	Orfeas Nicosia (B)	4–1	0–1
(A) Ethnikos Achna FC	6–1	Olympos Xylofagou (D)	5–0	1–1
(A) Enosis Neon Paralimni FC	2–4	Chalkanoras Idaliou (C)	2–0	0–4
(A) EPA Larnaca FC	0–4	AC Omonia (A)	0–3	0–1
(A) Olympiakos Nicosia	4 – 4 (a.)	Evagoras Paphos (B)	2–3	2–1

== Quarter-finals ==
Team 1	Agg.	Team 2	1st leg	2nd leg
(A) APOEL FC	3–2	Nea Salamis Famagusta FC (A)	1–1	2–1
(A) Ethnikos Achna FC	0–4	APOP Paphos (A)	0–0	0–4
(B) Evagoras Paphos	2–9	AEL Limassol (A)	2–2	0–7
(A) AC Omonia	6–0	Chalkanoras Idaliou (C)	3–0	3–0

== Semi-finals ==
Team 1	Agg.	Team 2	1st leg	2nd leg
(A) APOEL FC	0–3	AEL Limassol (A)	0–1	0–2
(A) APOP Paphos	1–2	AC Omonia (A)	0–2	1–0

== Final ==
26 June 1988

Omonia	2–1	AEL

Tsirion Stadium, Limassol

Cypriot Cup 1987–88 Winners
Omonia
8th title

== Sources ==
- "1987/88 Cyprus Cup". Rec.Sport.Soccer Statistics Foundation. 2016-01-14.

== See also ==
- Cypriot Cup
- 1987–88 Cypriot First Division
