= David Morley =

David Morley may refer to:

- David Morley (barman) (1967–2004), English barman and murder victim
- David Morley (diplomat) (born 1954), British diplomat
- David Morley (poet) (born 1964), British poet
- David Morley (swimmer) (born 1965), Bahamian swimmer
- Dave Morley (born 1977), English footballer
- David Morley, partner of international law firm Allen & Overy
- David Morley (musician) (born 1965), electronic musician
- David Morley (writer) (born 1962), British writer and radio producer
- David Morley (paediatrician) (1923–2009), British pioneer in children's health care
- David Hatton Morley (1746–1810), British coffee house keeper

== See also ==
- David Mobley (disambiguation)
