= 1985–86 Cypriot First Division =

Cypriot First Division
- Season: 1985–86
- Champions: APOEL (13th title)
- European Cup: APOEL (1st round)
- UEFA Cup: Omonia (1st round)
- Cup Winners' Cup: Apollon (1st round; via Cypriot Cup)
- Matches played: 182
- Goals scored: 484 (2.66 per match)
- Top goalscorer: Yiannos Ioannou (22 goals)

The 1985–86 Cypriot First Division was the 47th season of the Cypriot top-level football league. APOEL won their 13th title.

== Format ==
Fourteen teams participated in the 1985–86 Cypriot First Division. All teams played against each other twice, once at their home and once away. The team with the most points at the end of the season crowned champions. No team was relegated to the 1986–87 Cypriot Second Division.

The champions ensured their participation in the 1986–87 European Cup and the runners-up in the 1986–87 UEFA Cup.

== Changes from previous season ==
Omonia Aradippou and Evagoras Paphos were relegated from previous season and played in the 1985–86 Cypriot Second Division. They were replaced by the first two teams of the 1984–85 Cypriot Second Division, Ermis Aradippou and APOP Paphos.

== Stadia and locations ==
1985–86 Cypriot First Division

Club	Venue
AEL	Tsirion Stadium
Alki	GSZ Stadium
Anorthosis	GSZ Stadium
APOEL	Makario Stadium
Apollon	Tsirion Stadium
APOP	Pafiako Stadium
Aris	Tsirion Stadium
Enosis	Paralimni Stadium
EPA	GSZ Stadium
Ermis	Aradippou Municipal Stadium
Nea Salamina (Note: Nea Salanina used two venues. The first 7 out of 13 home games were played at Anagennisi Football Ground and the rest six at GSZ Stadium.)	Anagennisi Football Ground & GSZ Stadium
Olympiakos	GSP Stadium
Omonia	Makario Stadium
Pezoporikos	GSZ Stadium

== League standings ==
Pos	Team	Pld	W	D	L	GF	GA	GD	Pts	Qualification
1	APOEL (C)	26	22	3	1	61	12	+49	47	Qualification for European Cup first round
2	Omonia	26	16	8	2	62	23	+39	40	Qualification for UEFA Cup first round
3	Apollon Limassol	26	15	7	4	45	23	+22	37	Qualification for Cup Winners' Cup first round
4	Anorthosis Famagusta	26	13	6	7	36	27	+9	32	
5	Nea Salamis	26	7	11	8	26	26	0	25	
6	AEL Limassol	26	9	6	11	27	26	+1	24	
7	Pezoporikos Larnaca	26	7	10	9	32	32	0	24	
8	Enosis Neon Paralimni	26	8	7	11	33	35	−2	23	
9	EPA Larnaca	26	6	10	10	27	35	−8	22	
10	Alki Larnaca	26	5	12	9	22	31	−9	22	
11	Olympiakos Nicosia	26	7	8	11	34	51	−17	22	
12	APOP Paphos	26	6	9	11	26	44	−18	21	
13	Aris Limassol	26	5	9	12	32	42	−10	19	
14	Ermis Aradippou	26	0	6	20	21	77	−56	6	

Rules for classification: 1) Points, 2) Goal differences, 3) Goal for. Points system: Won=2 points, Drawn=1 point, Lost=0 points.
(C) Champions

== Results ==
Home \ Away	AEL	ALK	ANR	APN	APL	APP	ARS	ENP	EPA	ERM	NSL	OLY	OMO	POL
AEL		1–0	2–0	1–3	0–2	0–1	1–0	2–0	1–1	3–0	2–3	1–1	0–1	1–2
Alkí	0–4		0–1	0–2	1–0	2–0	1–1	1–1	1–1	5–1	0–0	1–0	0–2	0–0
Anorthosis	0–2	2–2		1–1	1–1	0–1	3–0	0–0	2–1	4–2	1–0	3–1	1–2	1–0
APOEL	1–0	2–0	3–1		4–1	4–0	3–0	2–0	3–2	5–0	1–0	6–0	2–0	3–0
Apollon	1–0	3–0	2–3	1–0		3–0	1–0	3–1	3–0	5–1	1–0	4–1	1–1	0–0
APOP	0–0	1–1	1–3	1–2	0–0		2–4	2–0	1–1	2–0	2–2	3–4	1–1	3–2
Aris	4–0	2–1	1–2	0–3	2–3	1–1		1–0	0–0	3–0	0–1	1–3	2–2	1–1
ENP	0–1	2–2	1–1	1–2	2–3	2–0	4–2		1–1	3–2	2–0	2–1	1–1	2–0
EPA	0–0	1–1	0–3	0–1	3–1	0–0	0–0	5–3		3–0	1–0	1–1	0–6	0–1
Ermis	2–3	0–0	0–0	1–2	0–1	0–0	4–4	0–3	0–1		1–1	3–3	0–3	3–4
Nea Salamis	1–1	0–0	1–0	0–0	1–3	3–0	0–0	1–1	0–0	3–1		0–0	1–2	2–1
Olympiakos	2–1	2–2	0–2	0–2	2–2	0–0	2–1	1–0	3–2	3–0	0–2		1–4	1–1
Omonia	1–0	0–1	2–0	1–1	0–0	7–2	1–1	2–1	3–2	9–0	4–2	3–0		2–1
Pezoporikos	1–1	2–0	0–1	1–3	0–0	2–0	1–1	0–0	0–1	4–0	2–2	4–2	2–2	

Legend: Blue = home team win; Yellow = draw; Red = away team win.

== See also ==
- Cypriot First Division
- 1985–86 Cypriot Cup
- List of top goalscorers in Cypriot First Division by season
- Cypriot football clubs in European competitions

== Sources ==
- "1985/86 Cypriot First Division". Rec.Sport.Soccer Statistics Foundation. 2016-01-14.
- Stilianou, Pampos; Georgiou, Neofitos (1988). Νέα Σαλαμίνα, 40 χρόνια πρωτοπόρας αθλητικής πορείας [Nea Salamina, 40 years pioneering sports history] (in Greek). Cyprus: Nea Salamina Famagusta.
