= David Hatton Morley =

David Hatton Morley (1746 - 8 April 1810) was a British coffee house keeper, and owned the British Coffee House at 27 Cockspur Street, London.

He was born in 1746 in Scotter, Lincolnshire, the son of William Morley and Anne Mercer.

In 1771, he married Mary Wright at St Margaret's, Westminster.

He died on 8 April 1810, aged 63.

In his will proved on 30 April 1810, David Hatton Morley is a Ventner of Saint Martin in the Fields, Middlesex.

He was the father of Atkinson Morley (1781-1858), who founded Morley's Hotel in Trafalgar Square.
