= 1985–86 Cypriot Third Division =

Cypriot Third Division
- Season: 1985–86
- Champions: APEP FC (1st title)
- Promoted: APEP FC; Digenis Akritas Ipsona; Onisilos Sotira

The 1985–86 Cypriot Third Division was the 15th season of the Cypriot third-level football league. APEP FC won their 1st title.

== Format ==
Fourteen teams participated in the 1985–86 Cypriot Third Division. All teams played against each other twice, once at their home and once away. The team with the most points at the end of the season crowned champions. The first three teams were promoted to 1986–87 Cypriot Second Division.

=== Point system ===
Teams received two points for a win, one point for a draw and zero points for a loss.

== League standings ==
Pos	Team	Pld	W	D	L	GF	GA	GD	Pts	Promotion
1	APEP FC	26	–	–	–	53	18	+35	38	Promoted to 1986–87 Cypriot Second Division
2	Digenis Akritas Ipsona	26	–	–	–	58	28	+30	37	Promoted to 1986–87 Cypriot Second Division
3	Onisilos Sotira	26	–	–	–	51	27	+24	36	Promoted to 1986–87 Cypriot Second Division
4	Chalkanoras Idaliou	26	–	–	–	49	35	+14	32	
5	Ethnikos Defteras	26	–	–	–	34	21	+13	32	
6	AEK Katholiki	26	–	–	–	33	37	−4	26	
7	Digenis Akritas Morphou FC	26	–	–	–	19	30	−11	25	
8	AEM Morphou	26	–	–	–	26	37	−11	24	
9	Neos Aionas Trikomou	26	–	–	–	34	39	−5	23	
10	Ethnikos Assia FC	26	–	–	–	21	31	−10	23	
11	Kentro Neotitas Maroniton	26	–	–	–	38	50	−12	21	
12	ASO Ormideia	26	–	–	–	32	44	−12	20	
13	Elpida Xylofagou	26	–	–	–	27	52	−25	15	
14	AEK Kythreas	26	–	–	–	26	45	−19	12	

Rules for classification: 1) Points, 2) Goal differences, 3) Goal for

== Sources ==
- "Ο Ύψωνας είναι τώρα τρίτος". Phileleftheros (in Greek). 1986-06-09. p. 6.
- "Τελική βαθμολογία Γ΄ Κατηγορίας". Haravgi (in Greek). 1986-06-28.

== See also ==
- Cypriot Third Division
- 1985–86 Cypriot First Division
- 1985–86 Cypriot Cup
