= Atkinson Morley =

British hotelier and philanthropist

Atkinson Morley (1781 - 14 July 1858) was a British hotelier and philanthropist. He was responsible for Morley's Hotel, designed by George Ledwell Taylor and which occupied the entire eastern side of London's Trafalgar Square, from 1832, until it was demolished in 1936 and replaced with South Africa House.

== Early life ==
Atkinson Morley was born in 1781, the son of David Hatton Morley, who owned the British Coffee House, which was rebuilt by Robert Adam in 1770, at 27 Cockspur Street.

== Career ==
In 1822 he owned the British Hotel at 25 Cockspur Street, but sold it to buy the Burlington Hotel at 19-20 Cork Street, before in 1831-31 building Morley's Hotel at 1-3 Trafalgar Square.

He was a governor at St George's Hospital, and had been Florence Nightingale's landlord, when she lived in Old Burlington Street.

== Death ==
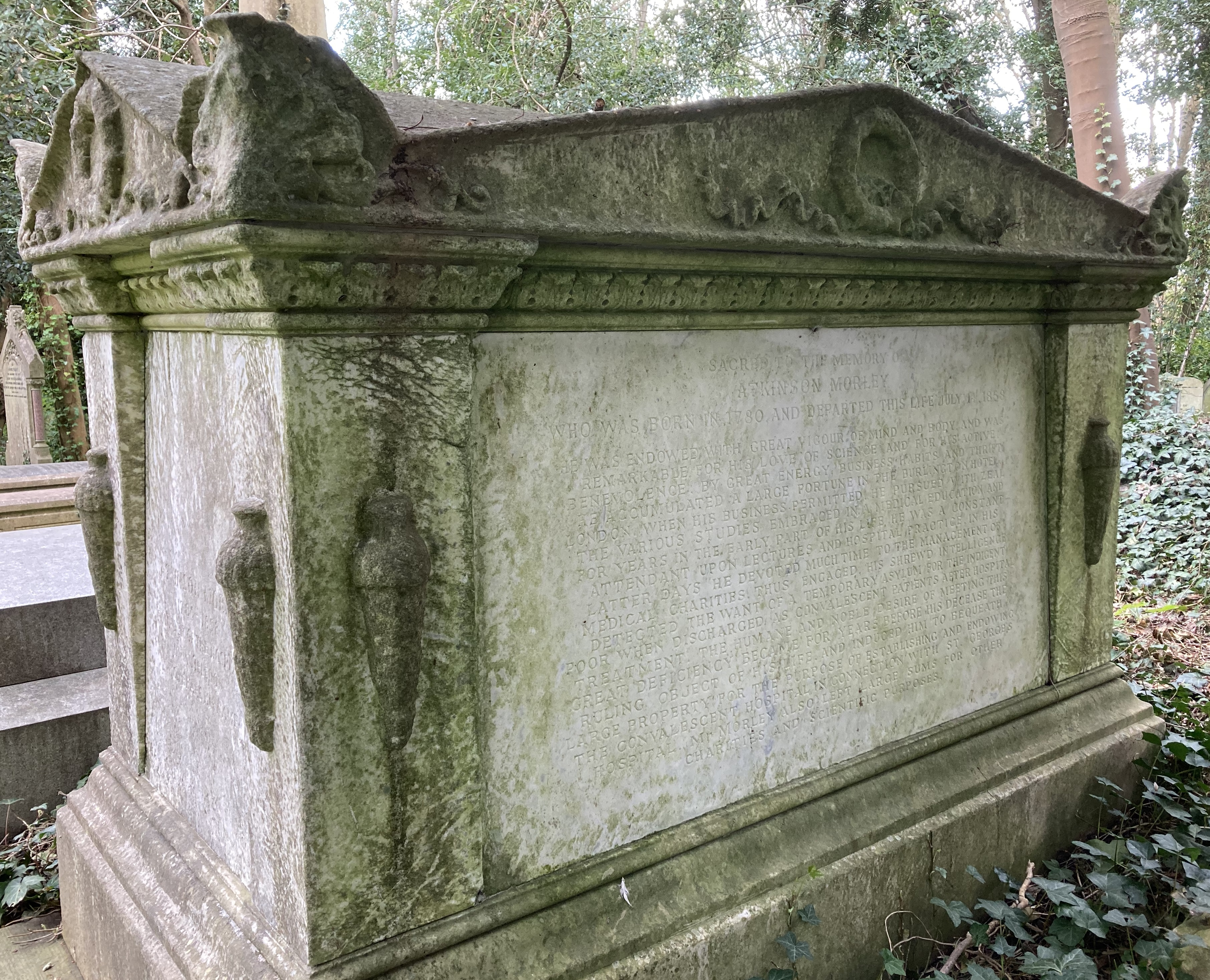
Grave of Atkinson Morley in Highgate Cemetery (west side)

At his death on 14 July 1858 he was living on Cork Street. He is buried in Highgate Cemetery.

== Legacy ==
He left £5000 to University College London for the Atkinson Morley surgical scholarships. His donation of £100,000 to St George's Hospital "for receiving, maintaining, and generally assisting convalescent poor patients", enabled the Atkinson Morley Hospital to be built in 1869.
