= 1984–85 Cypriot Third Division =

Cypriot Third Division
- Season: 1984–85
- Champions: Orfeas Athienou (1st title)
- Promoted: Orfeas Athienou; Othellos Athienou FC
- Relegated: OXEN Peristeronas; Iraklis Gerolakkou; ASIL Lysi

The 1984–85 Cypriot Third Division was the 14th season of the Cypriot third-level football league. Orfeas Athienou won their 1st title.

== Format ==
Sixteen teams participated in the 1984–85 Cypriot Third Division. All teams played against each other twice, once at their home and once away. The team with the most points at the end of the season crowned champions. The first two teams were promoted to 1985–86 Cypriot Second Division. The last three teams were relegated to the 1985–86 Cypriot Fourth Division.

=== Point system ===
Teams received two points for a win, one point for a draw and zero points for a loss.

== League standings ==
Pos	Team	Pld	W	D	L	GF	GA	GD	Pts	Promotion or relegation
1	Orfeas Athienou	30	–	–	–	49	26	+23	43	Promoted to 1985–86 Cypriot Second Division
2	Othellos Athienou FC	30	–	–	–	38	18	+20	42	Promoted to 1985–86 Cypriot Second Division
3	Ethnikos Assia FC	30	–	–	–	42	24	+18	39	
4	AEM Morphou	30	–	–	–	42	27	+15	36	
5	AEK Kythreas	30	–	–	–	34	24	+10	33	
6	APEP FC	30	–	–	–	55	39	+16	31	
7	Onisilos Sotira	30	–	–	–	38	37	+1	30	
8	ASO Ormideia	30	–	–	–	37	45	−8	30	
9	Kentro Neotitas Maroniton	30	–	–	–	40	41	−1	29	
10	Digenis Akritas Morphou FC	30	–	–	–	26	36	−10	28	
11	Ethnikos Defteras	30	–	–	–	33	32	+1	27	
12	Elpida Xylofagou	30	–	–	–	30	35	−5	27	
13	Neos Aionas Trikomou	30	–	–	–	43	50	−7	26	
14	OXEN Peristeronas	30	–	–	–	38	47	−9	24	Relegated to 1985–86 Cypriot Fourth Division
15	Iraklis Gerolakkou	30	–	–	–	31	56	−25	24	Relegated to 1985–86 Cypriot Fourth Division
16	ASIL Lysi	30	–	–	–	24	63	−39	11	Relegated to 1985–86 Cypriot Fourth Division

Rules for classification: 1) Points, 2) Goal differences, 3) Goal for

== Sources ==
- Kyriakou, Akis (2014-10-19). "Πριν 30 χρόνια στα πρωταθλήματα "μικρών"". www.sigmalive.com (in Greek). Archived from the original on 2016-08-12.
- "Ο Ορφέας πρωταθλητής χωρίς... στέψη". Simerini (in Greek). 1985-05-27. p. 7.
- "Ο Ορφέας Αθηένου αναδείχθηκε πρωταθλητής". Phileleftheros (in Greek). 1985-05-27. p. 8.

== See also ==
- Cypriot Third Division
- 1984–85 Cypriot First Division
- 1984–85 Cypriot Cup
