= 1987–88 Cypriot Third Division =

Cypriot Third Division
- Season: 1987–88
- Champions: Digenis Akritas Morphou FC (1st title)
- Promoted: Digenis Akritas Morphou FC; Chalkanoras Idaliou
- Relegated: AEM Morphou; Apollon Lympion; Achyronas Liopetriou

The 1987–88 Cypriot Third Division was the 17th season of the Cypriot third-level football league. Digenis Akritas Morphou FC won their 1st title.

== Format ==
Fourteen teams participated in the 1987–88 Cypriot Third Division. All teams played against each other twice, once at their home and once away. The team with the most points at the end of the season crowned champions. The first two teams were promoted to 1988–89 Cypriot Second Division. The last three teams were relegated to the 1988–89 Cypriot Fourth Division.

=== Point system ===
Teams received two points for a win, one point for a draw and zero points for a loss.

== League standings ==
Pos	Team	Pld	W	D	L	GF	GA	GD	Pts	Promotion or relegation
1	Digenis Akritas Morphou FC	26	–	–	–	37	15	+22	39	Promoted to 1988–89 Cypriot Second Division
2	Chalkanoras Idaliou	26	–	–	–	51	22	+29	37	Promoted to 1988–89 Cypriot Second Division
3	AEZ Zakakiou	26	–	–	–	41	27	+14	30	
4	AEK Katholiki	26	–	–	–	39	34	+5	26	
5	Libanos Kormakiti	26	–	–	–	34	37	−3	26	
6	Ethnikos Assia FC	26	–	–	–	35	25	+10	25	
7	Kentro Neotitas Maroniton	26	–	–	–	45	42	+3	25	
8	Orfeas Athienou	26	–	–	–	31	29	+2	25	
9	OXEN Peristeronas	26	–	–	–	31	37	−6	24	
10	ASO Ormideia	26	–	–	–	35	44	−9	24	
11	Neos Aionas Trikomou	26	–	–	–	24	41	−17	24	
12	AEM Morphou	26	–	–	–	18	20	−2	23	Relegated to 1988–89 Cypriot Fourth Division
13	Apollon Lympion	26	–	–	–	18	28	−10	22	Relegated to 1988–89 Cypriot Fourth Division
14	Achyronas Liopetriou	26	–	–	–	21	59	−38	14	Relegated to 1988–89 Cypriot Fourth Division

Rules for classification: 1) Points, 2) Goal differences, 3) Goal for

== Sources ==
- "Ο Διγενής πρωταθλητής". Philathlos (in Greek). 1988-05-23. p. 4.
- "Γ΄ κατηγορία". Phileleftheros (in Greek). 1988-06-20. p. 11.
- "Πρωταθλητής ο Διγενής". Simerini (in Greek). 1988-05-23. p. 13.

== See also ==
- Cypriot Third Division
- 1987–88 Cypriot First Division
- 1987–88 Cypriot Cup
