= 1987–88 Cypriot Fourth Division =

Cypriot Fourth Division
- Season: 1987–88
- Champions: Iraklis Gerolakkou; APEAN Ayia Napa; ATE PEK Parekklisias (1st title)
- Promoted: Iraklis Gerolakkou; APEAN Ayia Napa
- Relegated: ETHA Engomis; Achilleas Kaimakli FC; Livadiakos Livadion; AEK Kornos; Anagennisi Mouttalou; Karmiotissa Pano Polemidion; Ellinismos Akakiou

The 1987–88 Cypriot Fourth Division was the third season of the Cypriot fourth-level football league. The championship was split into three geographical groups, representing the Districts of Cyprus. The winners were:

- Nicosia-Keryneia Group: Iraklis Gerolakkou
- Larnaca-Famagusta Group: APEAN Ayia Napa
- Limassol-Paphos Group: ATE PEK Parekklisias

The three winners gave playoff matches and the two first were promoted to the 1988–89 Cypriot Third Division. Seven teams were relegated to regional leagues.

== See also ==
- Cypriot Fourth Division
- 1987–88 Cypriot First Division
- 1987–88 Cypriot Cup
