= Morley's Hotel =

Former hotel in London

Coordinates: 51.5082°N 0.1269°W

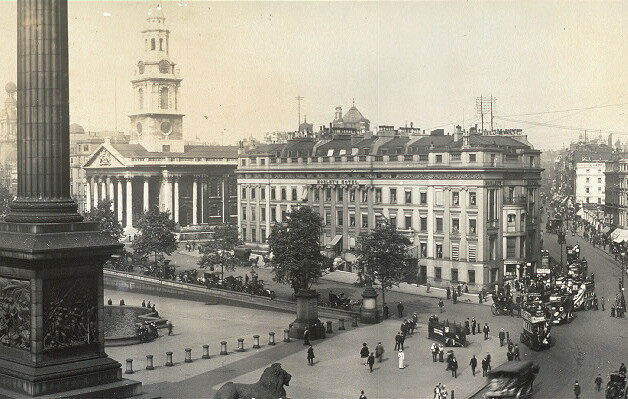
Morley's Hotel pictured in 1908

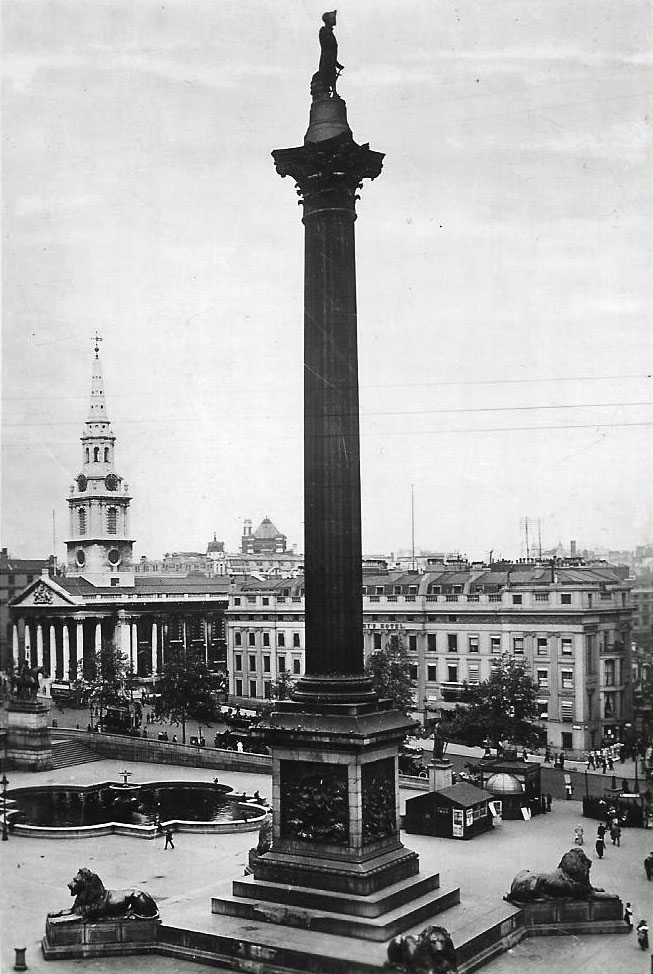
Morley's Hotel (directly behind Nelson's Column)

Morley's Hotel was a building which occupied the entire eastern side of London's Trafalgar Square, until it was demolished in 1936 and replaced with South Africa House. It was next to St Martin-in-the-Fields Church.

It was designed by the architect George Ledwell Taylor, and originally developed as apartments. It was built by Atkinson Morley in 1831, who in 1822 owned the British Hotel (also known as the British Coffee House) at 27 Cockspur Street, but had sold it to buy the Burlington Hotel at 19–20 Cork Street.

Morley's Hotel opened in 1832. In 1850, in his Hand-Book of London, Peter Cunningham described it as "well-frequented, and is good of its kind". Author Henry James recalled the fire in the coffee room and the vast four-poster beds.

Sir Arthur Conan Doyle stayed there for some time in 1900, while he was writing The Hound of the Baskervilles, and the fictional Northumberland Hotel of that book may well have been based on Morley's. He wrote to his mother in 1900 that he was "somewhat sick" of Morley's and intended to try the Golden Cross Hotel.

Other visitors to Morley's included Buffalo Bill Cody.

== See also ==
- Brigadier General Henry Prince committed suicide at the hotel in 1892
