= Bob Glozier =

English footballer

Personal information
- Full name: Robert Glozier
- Date of birth: 20 November 1948 (age 77)
- Place of birth: East Ham, England
- Height: 5 ft 10 1/2 in (1.79 m)
- Position: Full back

Youth career
- West Ham United

Senior career*
Years	Team	Apps	(Gls)
1966–1969	West Ham United	0	(0)
1969–1972	Torquay United	57	(1)
1972–1973	Guildford City		
1973–1975	Dartford		
1975–1976	Dover		
1976–1977	Maidstone United		
1977–1979	Gravesend & Northfleet		
1979–1983	Hastings United		
1983–1986	Crawley Town	132	(2)
1986	Bishop's Stortford		
1987	Chelmsford City	1	(0)

Managerial career
- 1990: Gravesend & Northfleet (caretaker)
- * Club domestic league appearances and goals

Robert Glozier (born 20 November 1948) is an English former footballer who played as a full back.

== Career ==
After joining the club as an apprentice, Glozier signed professional forms with West Ham United in 1966. In 1969, following failure to make a first team appearance for West Ham, Glozier joined Torquay United. During three years at the club, Glozier made 57 Football League, scoring once. On 25 October 1972, Glozier was awarded a testimonial by Torquay following a cruciate ligament injury. Following his spell at Torquay, Glozier dropped into non-League football, playing for Guildford City, Dartford, Dover, Maidstone United, Gravesend & Northfleet and Hastings United. In 1983, Glozier joined Crawley Town, making 132 league appearances, scoring twice, over the course of three years. Glozier later joined Bishop's Stortford and Chelmsford City, making a singular emergency league appearance for the latter, becoming one of the club's oldest players in the process.

Following his playing days, Glozier temporarily took up the role of caretaker manager at former club Gravesend & Northfleet.
