= Len Tomkins =

English footballer

Personal information
- Full name: Leonard Anthony Tomkins
- Date of birth: 16 January 1949 (age 77)
- Place of birth: Isleworth, England
- Position: Left winger

Youth career
- Crystal Palace

Senior career*
Years	Team	Apps	(Gls)
1967–1970	Crystal Palace	20	(2)
1971	Toronto Metros	9	(3)
1971	Leyton Orient	0	(0)
1971–1983	Chelmsford City	509	(30)
- Gravesend & Northfleet
- Aveley
- Hornchurch
- Bishop's Stortford

International career
- England Youth
- * Club domestic league appearances and goals

Leonard Anthony Tomkins (born 16 January 1949) is an English former footballer who played as a left winger.

== Career ==
In 1967, Tomkins graduated from Crystal Palace's academy to the first team. During three years at the club, Tomkins made 20 Football League appearances, scoring twice. In 1971, Tomkins signed for Toronto Metros, making nine appearances, scoring three times, during the 1971 North American Soccer League season. Upon his return to England, Tomkins signed for Leyton Orient. After failing to make a league appearance for the club, Tomkins played for Chelmsford City, Gravesend & Northfleet, Aveley, Hornchurch and Bishop's Stortford.
