= Brian Kerry =

English footballer

Personal information
- Full name: Brian Philip Kerry
- Date of birth: 18 December 1948
- Place of birth: Maltby, West Riding of Yorkshire, England
- Height: 5 ft 8 in (1.73 m)
- Position: Forward

Senior career*
Years	Team	Apps	(Gls)
1964–1967	Grimsby Town	1	(0)
1967–1968	Huddersfield Town	0	(0)
1968–19??	Boston United		
- * Club domestic league appearances and goals

Brian Philip Kerry (born 18 December 1948) was an English professional footballer who played as a forward.
