= Karl Alber =

German footballer and politician

Personal information
- Full name: Karl Alber
- Date of birth: 17 September 1948 (age 78)
- Place of birth: Frankenbach, Germany
- Position: Midfielder

Youth career
- –1967: SpVgg Frankenbach

Senior career*
Years	Team	Apps	(Gls)
1967–1973	VfR Heilbronn	182	(12)
1973–1976	Eintracht Bad Kreuznach	32	(1)
- * Club domestic league appearances and goals

Karl Alber (born 17 September 1948) is a German former footballer and politician.

Alber made 32 appearances in the 2. Bundesliga for Eintracht Bad Kreuznach during his playing career. He later became the mayor of Erlenbach, Baden-Württemberg, serving from 1986 until his retirement from politics in 2010.
