= Ray Booth =

Welsh footballer

Personal information
- Full name: Raymond Booth
- Date of birth: 5 September 1949 (age 77)
- Place of birth: Wrexham, Wales
- Position: Winger

Youth career
- Wrexham

Senior career*
Years	Team	Apps	(Gls)
1966–1969	Wrexham	5	(0)
- Rhyl
- * Club domestic league appearances and goals

Raymond Booth (born 5 September 1949) is a Welsh former professional footballer who played as a winger. He made appearances in the English Football League with his hometown club of Wrexham
