= Tony Ackerman =

English footballer (born 1948)

Personal information
- Full name: Tony Charles George Ackerman
- Date of birth: 20 February 1948 (age 78)
- Place of birth: Islington, England
- Position: Wing half

Youth career
- 1965–1966: West Ham United

Senior career*
Years	Team	Apps	(Gls)
1966–1968	Orient	4	(0)
1967	→ Corby Town (loan)		
- * Club domestic league appearances and goals

Tony Charles George Ackerman (born 20 February 1948) is an English former professional footballer who played as a wing half in the Football League for Orient.

== Life and career ==
Ackerman was born in Islington, London. He was on the books of West Ham United as an amateur, and moved on to Orient. After a couple of appearances for the reserve team, Ackerman signed a professional contract on 28 October 1966. His manager, Dick Graham, said "Tony has impressed me with his enthusiasm, and his height could give our defence that little something extra." He went straight into the team for the following day's Third Division match against Watford, playing at wing half alongside a number of other teenagers including the 17-year-old Paul Went; the match was drawn.

Ackerman made three league appearances during the 1966–67 season, and his fourth was as a winger in a goalless draw with Swindon Town in September 1967. He joined Southern League Premier Division club Corby Town on loan; after Orient suffered a number of injuries in October, he was recalled, but his services were not used, and he did not play for the first team again.

== Notes ==
- The English National Football Archive gives Anthony Alan as the player's given names – the details are behind a paywall, but the free-to-access database index shows initials of AA.
