= British Coffee House =

Meeting place that served coffee

Coordinates: 51.5074°N 0.1299°W

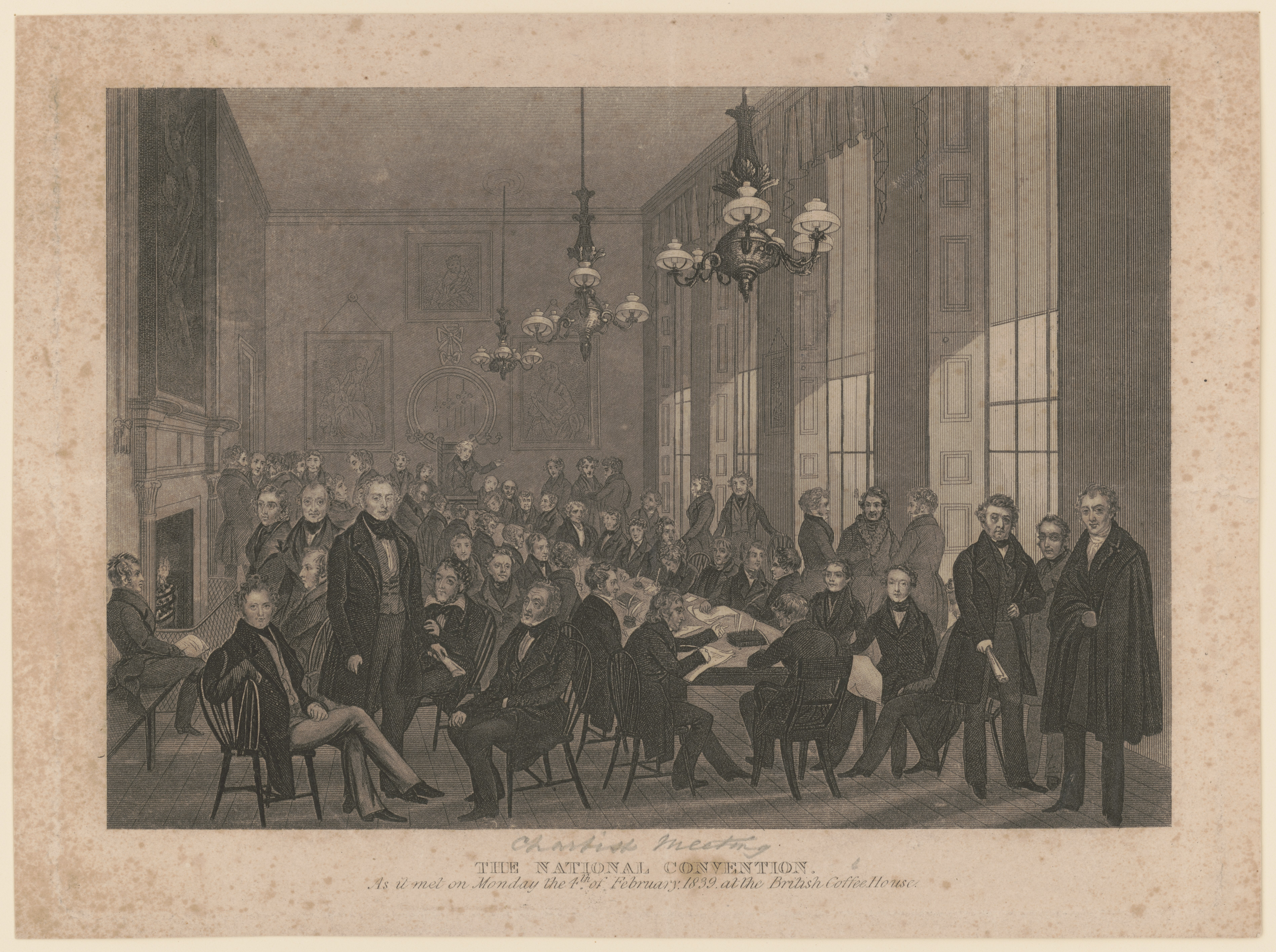
The Chartists' National Convention at the British Coffee House in February 1839

The British Coffee House was a coffeehouse at 27 Cockspur Street, London.

It is known to have existed in 1722, and was run in 1759 by a sister of John Douglas (bishop of Salisbury), and then by Mrs. Anderson, and was particularly popular with the Scottish. English coffeehouses in the 17th and 18th centuries acted as public meeting places. Ned Ward, the 18th century writer was a client to the coffeehouse.

It was rebuilt by Robert Adam in 1770, and was owned by David Hatton Morley, the father of Atkinson Morley.
