= Dick Huntley =

English footballer

Personal information
- Full name: Richard Bernard Huntley
- Date of birth: 5 January 1949 (age 77)
- Place of birth: Sunderland, England
- Position: Defender

Senior career*
Years	Team	Apps	(Gls)
1967–1969	Sunderland	1	(0)
1969–1970	Cambridge City		
1970–197?	Dunstable Town		
- * Club domestic league appearances and goals

Richard Bernard Huntley (born 5 January 1949) was an English professional footballer who played as a defender for Sunderland.
