= Terry Bartlett (footballer) =

English footballer (born 1948)

Personal information
- Full name: Terence Richard Bartlett
- Date of birth: 30 August 1948 (age 78)
- Place of birth: Cleethorpes, England
- Position: Winger

Senior career*
Years	Team	Apps	(Gls)
1967–1968	Grimsby Town	1	(0)
1968–1969	Dartford		
1969–19??	Immingham Town		
- * Club domestic league appearances and goals

Terence Richard Bartlett (born 30 August 1948) is an English former footballer who played as a winger.
