= Shimon Charnuha =

Israeli footballer (1948–2026)

Shimon Charnuha שמעון צ'רנוחה

Personal information
- Date of birth: May 10, 1948
- Place of birth: Jerusalem, Mandatory Palestine
- Date of death: August 5, 2026 (aged 78)
- Position: Defender

Youth career
- Beitar Jerusalem

Senior career*
Years	Team	Apps	(Gls)
1966–1969	Beitar Jerusalem		
1969–1971	Maccabi Netanya		
1971–1973	Beitar Jerusalem		

International career
1968	Israel	3	(0)
- * Club domestic league appearances and goals

Shimon Charnuha (Hebrew: שמעון צ'רנוחה; May 10, 1948 – August 5, 2026) was an Israeli footballer who played as a defender for Maccabi Netanya and Beitar Jerusalem. He was the first Beitar Jerusalem player to represent the national team. He had his debut on 10 January 1968 against Belgium.

== Biography ==
Charnuha was born into a Jewish-Ukrainian family from the Kharkiv region. He was the son of Holocaust survivors; his father had left a wife and four children behind in Auschwitz, whilst his mother left the camp with just one child. His parents met after the Second World War in a displaced persons' camp in Germany and subsequently emigrated to Israel when he was nine months old. He played for Beitar Jerusalem's youth team and, at the age of 15, was promoted to the first team by manager Samuel Raznik, who was impressed by his abilities. During those years, he took over the leadership of the Beitar defence from Shaul 'the King' Mizrahi and played alongside the team's stars: Dr Raul Geller, Udi Robovitz, Chaim Azoulay and Yitzhak Monse. He initially played for Beitar whilst the club was still in the second division, until the 1966–68 season, during which Beitar secured promotion to the top flight.

He spent the bulk of his career, from the youth team until 1972, at Beitar Jerusalem, with the exception of one season (1970–1971), during which he played for Maccabi Netanya and won his only title there – that season’s league championship. At the end of the 1972 season, he left Beitar following a falling-out with the club chairman, Jehoshua Matzah, and moved to Shimshon Tel Aviv.

Charnuha died on August 5, 2026, at the age of 78.
