= 1987–88 Cypriot First Division =

Cypriot First Division
- Season: 1987–88
- Dates: 03 Oct 1987 - 19 Jun 1988
- Champions: Pezoporikos (2nd title)
- Relegated: APEP; Alki; Anagennisi
- European Cup: Pezoporikos (1st round)
- UEFA Cup: APOEL (1st round)
- Cup Winners' Cup: Omonia (1st round; via Cypriot Cup)
- Matches played: 240
- Goals scored: 648 (2.7 per match)
- Top goalscorer: Tasos Zouvanis (23 goals)

The 1987–88 Cypriot First Division was the 49th season of the Cypriot top-level football league. Pezoporikos won their 2nd title.

== Format ==
Sixteen teams participated in the 1987–88 Cypriot First Division. All teams played against each other twice, once at their home and once away. The team with the most points at the end of the season crowned champions. The last three teams were relegated to the 1988–89 Cypriot Second Division.

The champions ensured their participation in the 1988–89 European Cup and the runners-up in the 1988–89 UEFA Cup.

=== Point system ===
Teams received two points for a win, one point for a draw and zero points for a loss.

== Changes from previous season ==
Omonia Aradippou and Ermis Aradippou were relegated from previous season and played in the 1987–88 Cypriot Second Division. They were replaced by the first two teams of the 1986–87 Cypriot Second Division, APEP and Anagennisi Deryneia.

== Stadia and locations ==
1987–88 Cypriot First Division

Club	Venue
AEL	Tsirion Stadium
Alki	GSZ Stadium
Anagennisi	Anagennisi Football Ground
Anorthosis	Antonis Papadopoulos Stadium
APEP	Tsirion Stadium
APOEL	Makario Stadium
Apollon	Tsirion Stadium
APOP	Pafiako Stadium
Aris	Tsirion Stadium
Ethnikos	Dasaki Stadium
Enosis	Paralimni Municipal Stadium
EPA	GSZ Stadium
Nea Salamis	Antonis Papadopoulos Stadium
Olympiakos	GSP Stadium
Omonia	Makario Stadium
Pezoporikos	GSZ Stadium

== League standings ==
Pos	Team	Pld	W	D	L	GF	GA	GD	Pts	Qualification or relegation
1	Pezoporikos (C)	30	19	10	1	56	20	+36	48	Qualification for European Cup first round
2	APOEL	30	22	3	5	66	23	+43	47	Qualification for UEFA Cup first round
3	Omonia	30	15	7	8	59	32	+27	37	Qualification for Cup Winners' Cup first round
4	Enosis Neon Parlimni	30	14	8	8	44	38	+6	36	
5	Apollon	30	13	9	8	46	24	+22	35	
6	AEL	30	15	5	10	46	33	+13	35	
7	Nea Salamis	30	14	5	11	43	34	+9	33	
8	Anorthosis	30	9	12	9	36	36	0	30	
9	EPA	30	10	7	13	37	43	−6	27	
10	APOP	30	9	8	13	31	34	−3	26	
11	Aris	30	10	6	14	49	54	−5	26	
12	Olympiakos	30	9	7	14	32	48	−16	25	
13	Ethnikos	30	5	13	12	27	44	−17	23	
14	APEP (R)	30	5	9	16	23	54	−31	19	Relegation to Cypriot Second Division
15	Alki (R)	30	4	9	17	27	63	−36	17	Relegation to Cypriot Second Division
16	Anagennisi (R)	30	5	6	19	26	68	−42	16	Relegation to Cypriot Second Division

Rules for classification: 1) Points, 2) Goal differences, 3) Goal for. Points system: Won=2 points, Drawn=1 point, Lost=0 points.
(C) Champions; (R) Relegated

== Results ==
Home \ Away	AEL	ALK	ANG	ANR	APE	APN	APL	APP	ARS	ETH	ENP	EPA	NSL	OLY	OMO	POL
AEL		3–1	0–0	0–0	4–2	1–0	1–0	0–1	3–0	0–0	3–1	2–1	1–0	4–0	1–0	0–2
Alki	3–6		1–2	1–6	0–0	0–5	0–2	0–3	3–5	2–2	0–1	2–1	1–0	0–1	2–3	0–0
Anagennisi	0–2	1–1		0–0	3–1	2–7	0–1	1–0	2–4	2–1	0–2	3–1	1–3	0–0	1–2	0–2
Anorthosis	3–1	0–0	2–0		1–1	1–2	1–0	2–0	1–0	1–1	0–1	0–0	1–0	0–1	2–2	1–2
APEP	3–0	1–2	3–1	0–0		1–2	1–1	0–2	1–0	1–0	0–0	0–2	2–3	2–2	0–3	0–0
APOEL	1–0	0–1	3–0	4–1	6–0		2–1	4–2	2–0	2–0	2–0	5–1	1–0	1–0	0–0	5–0
Apollon	4–1	3–0	6–0	2–0	2–0	0–1		2–1	5–0	3–0	3–0	3–1	0–2	0–0	1–1	1–1
APOP	2–4	1–0	4–1	1–1	1–2	1–2	0–0		0–0	0–1	2–2	0–0	1–0	1–0	2–0	2–2
Aris	3–1	2–1	1–1	2–2	3–1	2–3	2–0	1–1		5–2	3–0	0–2	0–2	5–0	3–4	1–2
Ethnikos	0–3	1–1	3–1	2–4	0–0	1–1	0–2	0–0	0–0		5–2	3–3	2–0	0–0	1–0	0–3
ENP	0–4	0–0	2–1	5–1	0–0	2–2	0–0	1–0	3–1	0–0		3–1	1–0	4–0	1–0	0–3
EPA	0–0	2–0	3–1	2–1	3–0	3–0	2–2	1–0	0–0	1–0	0–2		0–1	1–2	3–2	1–2
Nea Salamis	0–0	5–1	3–1	2–2	2–1	2–1	1–1	2–1	6–2	0–0	0–1	1–0		0–1	3–2	0–1
Olympiakos	3–1	3–3	2–0	0–1	5–0	0–1	2–1	0–1	1–4	2–0	2–6	1–1	3–3		0–2	0–1
Omonia	1–0	4–1	1–1	3–0	5–0	0–1	4–0	3–1	3–0	2–2	2–1	5–0	1–2	1–0		0–0
Pezoporikos	2–0	0–0	7–0	1–1	1–0	1–0	0–0	2–0	2–0	3–0	3–3	2–1	4–0	4–1	3–3	

Legend: Blue = home team win; Yellow = draw; Red = away team win.

== See also ==
- Cypriot First Division
- 1987–88 Cypriot Cup
- List of top goalscorers in Cypriot First Division by season
- Cypriot football clubs in European competitions

== Sources ==
- "1987/88 Cypriot First Division". Rec.Sport.Soccer Statistics Foundation. 2016-01-14.
