= David Mobley (footballer) =

English footballer

Personal information
- Full name: David Leslie Mobley
- Date of birth: 24 August 1948 (age 78)
- Place of birth: Oxford, England
- Position: Full-back

Senior career*
Years	Team	Apps	(Gls)
1965–1969	Sheffield Wednesday	0	(0)
1969–1970	Grimsby Town	27	(0)
1970–197?	Altrincham		
1973–1979	Macclesfield Town	187	(0)
- * Club domestic league appearances and goals

David Leslie Mobley (born 24 August 1948) was an English professional footballer who played as a full-back.

Later played for Mossley in August 1979 and scored the winning goal for Mossley against Crewe Alexandra in 1980 FA Cup before retiring in 1981.
