= 1986–87 Cypriot First Division =

Cypriot First Division
- Season: 1986–87
- Champions: Omonia (15th title)
- Relegated: Omonia Ar.; Ermis
- European Cup: Omonia (1st round)
- UEFA Cup: EPA (1st round)
- Cup Winners' Cup: AEL (1st round; via Cypriot Cup)
- Matches played: 240
- Goals scored: 677 (2.82 per match)
- Top goalscorer: Spas Dzhevizov (32 goals)

The 1986–87 Cypriot First Division was the 48th season of the Cypriot top-level football league. Omonia won their 15th title.

== Format ==
Sixteen teams participated in the 1986–87 Cypriot First Division. All teams played against each other twice, once at their home and once away. The team with the most points at the end of the season crowned champions. The last two teams were relegated to the 1987–88 Cypriot Second Division.

The champions ensured their participation in the 1987–88 European Cup and the runners-up in the 1987–88 UEFA Cup.

== Changes from previous season ==
No team was relegated from the previous season. The first two teams of the 1985–86 Cypriot Second Division, Ethnikos Achna and Omonia Aradippou were promoted and added to the First Division.

== Stadia and locations ==
1986–87 Cypriot First Division

| Club | Venue |
|---|---|
| AEL | Tsirion Stadium |
| Alki | GSZ Stadium |
| Anorthosis | Antonis Papadopoulos Stadium |
| APOEL | Makario Stadium |
| Apollon | Tsirion Stadium |
| APOP | Pafiako Stadium |
| Aris | Tsirion Stadium |
| Ethnikos | Dasaki Stadium |
| Enosis | Paralimni Municipal Stadium |
| EPA | GSZ Stadium |
| Ermis | Aradippou Municipal Stadium |
| Nea Salamis | GSZ Stadium |
| Olympiakos | GSP Stadium |
| Omonia Ar. | Aradippou Municipal Stadium |
| Omonia | Makario Stadium |
| Pezoporikos | GSZ Stadium |

== League standings ==
| Pos | Team | Pld | W | D | L | GF | GA | GD | Pts | Qualification or relegation |
|---|---|---|---|---|---|---|---|---|---|---|
| 1 | Omonia (C) | 30 | 26 | 0 | 4 | 86 | 28 | +58 | 52 | Qualification for European Cup first round |
| 2 | APOEL (Note: In 1986 APOEL was drawn against Besiktas J.K. for the second round of the 1986–87 European Cup. This was the first time that a Cypriot team faced a Turkish team in a European football competition (see Cyprus dispute). The Cypriot government prohibited APOEL from playing against the Turkish team, so APOEL was punished with one year disqualification from any UEFA competition. So, the third team of the table, EPA, took APOEL place in 1987–88 UEFA Cup.) | 30 | 19 | 9 | 2 | 58 | 11 | +47 | 47 | |
| 3 | EPA | 30 | 18 | 7 | 5 | 45 | 20 | +25 | 43 | Qualification for UEFA Cup first round |
| 4 | AEL | 30 | 14 | 8 | 8 | 62 | 34 | +28 | 36 | Qualification for Cup Winners' Cup first round |
| 5 | Aris | 30 | 12 | 11 | 7 | 53 | 35 | +18 | 35 | |
| 6 | Apollon | 30 | 13 | 8 | 9 | 52 | 34 | +18 | 34 | |
| 7 | Olympiakos | 30 | 12 | 10 | 8 | 47 | 46 | +1 | 34 | |
| 8 | Anorthosis | 30 | 9 | 15 | 6 | 35 | 30 | +5 | 33 | |
| 9 | APOP | 30 | 8 | 11 | 11 | 39 | 44 | −5 | 27 | |
| 10 | Enosis Neon Paralimni | 30 | 9 | 8 | 13 | 34 | 53 | −19 | 26 | |
| 11 | Pezoporikos | 30 | 4 | 16 | 10 | 25 | 28 | −3 | 24 | |
| 12 | Alki | 30 | 5 | 14 | 11 | 30 | 39 | −9 | 24 | |
| 13 | Nea Salamis | 30 | 7 | 10 | 13 | 45 | 54 | −9 | 24 | |
| 14 | Ethnikos | 30 | 5 | 12 | 13 | 27 | 50 | −23 | 22 | |
| 15 | Omonia Aradippou (R) | 30 | 2 | 9 | 19 | 21 | 64 | −43 | 13 | Relegation to Cypriot Second Division |
| 16 | Ermis (R) | 30 | 1 | 4 | 25 | 19 | 108 | −89 | 6 | Relegation to Cypriot Second Division |

Rules for classification: 1) Points, 2) Goal differences, 3) Goal for. Points system: Won=2 points, Drawn=1 point, Lost=0 points.
(C) Champions; (R) Relegated

== Results ==
| Home \ Away | AEL | ALK | ANR | APN | APL | APP | ARS | ETH | ENP | EPA | ERM | NSL | OLY | OMA | OMN | POL |
|---|---|---|---|---|---|---|---|---|---|---|---|---|---|---|---|---|
| AEL | | 1–1 | 0–0 | 0–1 | 1–3 | 2–1 | 1–1 | 1–1 | 3–2 | 1–0 | 7–0 | 4–2 | 5–1 | 2–0 | 3–1 | 2–0 |
| Alki | 1–1 | | 1–1 | 2–3 | 1–2 | 1–1 | 1–1 | 1–1 | 1–2 | 0–1 | 2–1 | 0–0 | 0–0 | 3–2 | 0–4 | 0–2 |
| Anorthosis | 3–1 | 0–0 | | 0–3 | 1–0 | 1–1 | 1–1 | 0–0 | 1–3 | 2–0 | 5–0 | 0–0 | 3–1 | 0–0 | 3–1 | 2–2 |
| APOEL | 0–0 | 1–1 | 0–0 | | 0–0 | 1–1 | 3–1 | 3–0 | 4–1 | 0–1 | 4–0 | 4–0 | 0–0 | 6–0 | 1–0 | 1–0 |
| Apollon | 2–2 | 0–1 | 5–0 | 0–2 | | 1–0 | 3–4 | 5–1 | 5–2 | 1–4 | 6–0 | 2–1 | 4–1 | 1–1 | 0–3 | 1–1 |
| APOP | 3–2 | 1–1 | 2–1 | 1–2 | 0–0 | | 1–1 | 2–0 | 3–0 | 0–3 | 4–0 | 1–4 | 0–0 | 2–1 | 3–2 | 1–1 |
| Aris | 0–1 | 3–0 | 1–0 | 0–0 | 1–0 | 0–1 | | 1–1 | 4–0 | 0–1 | 5–1 | 4–1 | 1–1 | 2–0 | 1–5 | 2–0 |
| Ethnikos | 0–3 | 0–0 | 1–1 | 0–4 | 0–2 | 2–1 | 2–2 | | 1–0 | 1–3 | 3–1 | 0–3 | 0–1 | 2–0 | 1–3 | 0–0 |
| ENP | 1–0 | 0–0 | 1–1 | 0–3 | 0–2 | 3–2 | 3–1 | 2–1 | | 0–0 | 1–0 | 2–2 | 1–1 | 1–1 | 1–3 | 0–2 |
| EPA | 3–1 | 2–1 | 1–1 | 1–1 | 1–0 | 1–0 | 2–2 | 2–2 | 3–0 | | 2–0 | 4–0 | 0–0 | 2–0 | 0–1 | 1–0 |
| Ermis | 0–7 | 0–3 | 0–2 | 0–4 | 1–1 | 2–1 | 1–4 | 1–6 | 2–5 | 0–1 | | 0–3 | 1–1 | 0–1 | 0–6 | 1–1 |
| Nea Salamis | 1–4 | 2–1 | 1–1 | 0–2 | 0–1 | 4–4 | 2–2 | 1–1 | 1–2 | 0–2 | 5–0 | | 2–3 | 0–1 | 1–3 | 3–1 |
| Olympiakos | 2–1 | 2–0 | 0–1 | 0–3 | 1–1 | 4–1 | 0–1 | 3–0 | 2–1 | 3–2 | 5–3 | 1–1 | | 3–2 | 0–5 | 1–0 |
| Omonia Ar. | 2–5 | 2–5 | 1–2 | 0–0 | 1–3 | 0–0 | 0–6 | 0–0 | 0–0 | 0–1 | 2–2 | 1–2 | 1–6 | | 1–4 | 0–0 |
| Omonia N. | 1–0 | 2–1 | 2–1 | 2–1 | 2–0 | 4–1 | 3–1 | 4–0 | 4–0 | 2–0 | 5–1 | 4–3 | 6–4 | 2–0 | | 1–0 |
| Pezoporikos | 1–1 | 1–1 | 1–1 | 0–1 | 1–1 | 0–0 | 0–0 | 0–0 | 1–2 | 1–1 | 6–1 | 1–1 | 0–0 | 0–0 | 0–1 | |

Legend: Blue = home team win; Yellow = draw; Red = away team win.

== See also ==
- Cypriot First Division
- 1986–87 Cypriot Cup
- List of top goalscorers in Cypriot First Division by season
- Cypriot football clubs in European competitions

== Sources ==
- "1986/87 Cypriot First Division". Rec.Sport.Soccer Statistics Foundation. 2016-01-14.
