= Orfeas Athienou =

- Founded: 1948

Orfeas Athienou is a Cypriot football club based in Athienou. Founded in 1948, was playing sometimes in Second, in Third and in Fourth Division.

== Honours ==
- Cypriot Third Division:
  - Champions (1): 1985
