= ASO Ormideia =

- Founded: 1956

ASO Ormideia was a Cypriot football club based in Ormideia, Larnaca. It competed in the 1987–88 Cypriot Cup.
