= 1990–91 Cypriot Cup =

Tournament details
- Country: Cyprus
- Dates: 27 October 1990 – 9 June 1991
- Teams: 72

Final positions
- Champions: Omonia (9th title)

The 1990–91 Cypriot Cup was the 49th edition of the Cypriot Cup. A total of 72 clubs entered the competition. It began on 27 October 1990 with the first preliminary round and concluded on 9 June 1991 with the final which was held at Makario Stadium. Omonia won their 9th Cypriot Cup trophy after beating Olympiakos Nicosia 1–0 in the final.

== Format ==
In the 1990–91 Cypriot Cup, participated all the teams of the Cypriot First Division, the Cypriot Second Division, the Cypriot Third Division and 30 of the 43 teams of the Cypriot Fourth Division.

The competition consisted of seven knock-out rounds. In the preliminary rounds each tie was played as a single leg and was held at the home ground of one of the two teams, according to the draw results. Each tie winner was qualifying to the next round. If a match was drawn, extra time was following. If extra time was drawn, there was a replay at the ground of the team who were away for the first game. If the rematch was also drawn, then extra time was following and if the match remained drawn after extra time the winner was decided by penalty shoot-out.

The next four rounds were played in a two-legged format, each team playing a home and an away match against their opponent. The team which scored more goals on aggregate, was qualifying to the next round. If the two teams scored the same number of goals on aggregate, then the team which scored more goals away from home was advancing to the next round.

If both teams had scored the same number of home and away goals, then extra time was following after the end of the second leg match. If during the extra thirty minutes both teams had managed to score, but they had scored the same number of goals, then the team who scored the away goals was advancing to the next round (i.e. the team which was playing away). If there weren't scored any goals during extra time, the qualifying team was determined by penalty shoot-out.

The cup winner secured a place in the 1991–92 European Cup Winners' Cup.

== First preliminary round ==
All the 14 clubs of the Cypriot Third Division and 30 clubs from the Cypriot Fourth Division (first ten of the league table of each group at the day of draw) participated in the first preliminary round.

Team 1	Score	Team 2
Achyronas Liopetriou (D)	4–0	AEM Morphou (D)
Adonis Idaliou (C)	4–1	Ellinismos Akakiou (D)
AEK Katholiki (C)	1–0	Ayia Napa F.C. (C)
AEZ Zakakiou (C)	2–0	Elia Lythrodonta (D)
APEY Ypsona (D)	2–1	ASIL Lysi (D)
Apollon Lympion (C)	2–0	Olympias Frenarou (D)
ASO Ormideia (C)	2–3	Panikos Pourgouridis Lemesou (D)
ATE PEK Ergaton (D)	3–0	Orfeas Athienou (D)
Digenis Akritas Ipsona (C)	3–1	Kimonas Xylotympou (D)
Digenis Oroklinis (D)	2–1	Kentro Neotitas Maroniton (D)
Dynamo Pervolion (D)	1–1, 2–6	Doxa Polemidion (D)
ENTHOI Lakatamia FC (C)	2–1	Olympos Xylofagou (D)
Elpida Prosfigon Paphou (D)	0–1	MEAP Nisou (D)
Ethnikos Assia F.C. (C)	1–0	Othellos Athienou F.C. (C)
Fotiakos Frenarou (D)	0–5	AEK Kakopetrias (D)
Keravnos Strovolou FC (C)	1–0	Anagennisi Lythrodonta (D)
Kormakitis FC (D)	2–1	APEA Akrotiriou (D)
P & S Zakakiou (D)	0–3	Doxa Devtera (D)
PAEEK FC (C)	1–0	Neos Aionas Trikomou (D)
Poseidonas Giolou (D)	1–2	Triptolemus Evrychou (D)
Rotsidis Mammari (D)	0–1	Iraklis Gerolakkou (D)
Tsaggaris Peledriou (C)	2–1	OXEN Peristeronas (C)

== Second preliminary round ==
The 14 clubs of the Cypriot Second Division advanced directly to the second preliminary round and met the winners of the first preliminary round ties:

Team 1	Score	Team 2
Achyronas Liopetriou (D)	1–2	Doxa Devtera (D)
Adonis Idaliou (C)	0–2	AEK Katholiki (C)
AEK Kakopetrias (D)	1–1, 2–3	Elpida Xylofagou (B)
AEZ Zakakiou (C)	4–2	Iraklis Gerolakkou (D)
Akritas Chlorakas (B)	3–0	Triptolemus Evrychou (D)
Chalkanoras Idaliou (B)	7–2	Panikos Pourgouridis Lemesou (D)
Digenis Akritas Morphou (B)	3–4	APEP Pelendriou (B)
Doxa Katokopias F.C. (B)	1–3	Anagennisi Deryneia (B)
Doxa Polemidion (D)	0–1	APEY Ypsona (D)
ENTHOI Lakatamia FC (C)	1–3 (a.e.t.)	Ethnikos Defteras (B)
Ethnikos Achna FC (B)	6–1	PAEEK FC (C)
Ethnikos Assia F.C. (C)	3–0	ATE PEK Ergaton (D)
Evagoras Paphos (B)	6–0	Apollon Lympion (C)
MEAP Nisou (D)	3–5	Ermis Aradippou (B)
Omonia Aradippou (B)	3–1	Digenis Akritas Ipsona (C)
Onisilos Sotira (B)	6–0	Kormakitis FC (D)
Orfeas Nicosia (B)	3–2	Keravnos Strovolou FC (C)
Tsaggaris Peledriou (C)	5–1	Digenis Oroklinis (D)

== First round ==
The 14 clubs of the Cypriot First Division advanced directly to the first round and met the winners of the second preliminary round ties:

Team 1	Agg.	Team 2	1st leg	2nd leg
AEK Katholiki (C)	2–4	Ethnikos Achna FC (B)	1–3	1–1
AEL Limassol (A)	4–1	APOP Paphos (A)	3–0	1–1
Akritas Chlorakas (B)	4–2	Alki Larnaca F.C. (A)	4–0	0–2
APEY Ypsona (D)	0–14	EPA Larnaca FC (A)	0–6	0–8
Apollon Limassol (A)	5–3	APOEL FC (A)	3–2	2–1
Aris Limassol F.C. (A)	9–3	Ethnikos Defteras (B)	7–0	2–3
Chalkanoras Idaliou (B)	2–6	APEP Pelendriou (B)	1–5	1–1
Enosis Neon Paralimni FC (A)	1–4	Anorthosis Famagusta FC (A)	1–2	0–2
Ermis Aradippou (B)	1–12	AC Omonia (A)	1–6	0–6
Ethnikos Assia F.C. (C)	1–4	APEP F.C. (A)	1–2	0–2
Evagoras Paphos (B)	6–1	Doxa Devtera (D)	3–0	3–1
Nea Salamis Famagusta FC (A)	2–2 (a)	Anagennisi Deryneia (B)	1–2	1–0
Omonia Aradippou (B)	0–1	Olympiakos Nicosia (A)	0–0	0–1
Onisilos Sotira (B)	5–4	AEZ Zakakiou (C)	3–3	2–1
Pezoporikos Larnaca (A)	13–3	Elpida Xylofagou (B)	5–1	8–2
Tsaggaris Peledriou (C)	5–8	Orfeas Nicosia (B)	1–2	4–6

== Second round ==
Team 1	Agg.	Team 2	1st leg	2nd leg
AEL Limassol (A)	7–1	APEP F.C. (A)	6–0	1–1
Akritas Chlorakas (B)	2–1	Onisilos Sotira (B)	2–0	0–0
Anorthosis Famagusta FC (A)	1–1 (1–3 p)	Ethnikos Achna FC (B)	0–1	1–0
Aris Limassol F.C. (A)	5–2	Orfeas Nicosia (B)	4–1	1–1
EPA Larnaca FC (A)	0–6	Apollon Limassol (A)	0–3	0–3
Olympiakos Nicosia (A)	3–2	Evagoras Paphos (B)	2–1	1–1
AC Omonia (A)	3–0	APEP Pelendriou (B)	1–0	2–0
Pezoporikos Larnaca (A)	13–1	Anagennisi Deryneia (B)	4–0	9–1

== Quarter-finals ==
Team 1	Agg.	Team 2	1st leg	2nd leg
AEL Limassol (A)	2–1	Apollon Limassol (A)	0–0	2–1
Ethnikos Achna FC (B)	3–3 (1–3 p)	Olympiakos Nicosia (A)	1–2	2–1
AC Omonia (A)	5–0	Akritas Chlorakas (B)	2–0	3–0
Pezoporikos Larnaca (A)	5–1	Aris Limassol F.C. (A)	3–1	2–0

== Semi-finals ==
Team 1	Agg.	Team 2	1st leg	2nd leg
AEL Limassol (A)	1–2	Olympiakos Nicosia (A)	0–0	1–2
Pezoporikos Larnaca (A)	1–1 (2–4 p)	AC Omonia (A)	1–0	0–1

== Final ==
9 June 1991

Omonia	1–0	Olympiakos Nicosia

Makario Stadium, Nicosia

Cypriot Cup 1990–91 Winners
Omonia
9th title

== Sources ==
- "1990/91 Cyprus Cup". Rec.Sport.Soccer Statistics Foundation. 2016-01-14.

== See also ==
- Cypriot Cup
- 1990–91 Cypriot First Division
