= 1988–89 Cypriot Cup =

Tournament details
- Country: Cyprus
- Dates: 16 November 1988 – 10 June 1989
- Teams: 68

Final positions
- Champions: AEL (6th title)

The 1988–89 Cypriot Cup was the 47th edition of the Cypriot Cup. A total of 68 clubs entered the competition. It began on 16 November 1988 with the first preliminary round and concluded on 10 June 1989 with the final which was held at Tsirion Stadium. AEL Limassol won their 6th Cypriot Cup trophy after beating Aris 3–2 in the final.

== Format ==
In the 1988–89 Cypriot Cup, participated all the teams of the Cypriot First Division, the Cypriot Second Division, the Cypriot Third Division and 24 of the 42 teams of the Cypriot Fourth Division.

The competition consisted of seven knock-out rounds. In the preliminary rounds each tie was played as a single leg and was held at the home ground of one of the two teams, according to the draw results. Each tie winner was qualifying to the next round. If a match was drawn, extra time was following. If extra time was drawn, there was a replay at the ground of the team who were away for the first game. If the rematch was also drawn, then extra time was following and if the match remained drawn after extra time the winner was decided by penalty shoot-out.

The next four rounds were played in a two-legged format, each team playing a home and an away match against their opponent. The team which scored more goals on aggregate, was qualifying to the next round. If the two teams scored the same number of goals on aggregate, then the team which scored more goals away from home was advancing to the next round.

If both teams had scored the same number of home and away goals, then extra time was following after the end of the second leg match. If during the extra thirty minutes both teams had managed to score, but they had scored the same number of goals, then the team who scored the away goals was advancing to the next round (i.e. the team which was playing away). If there weren't scored any goals during extra time, the qualifying team was determined by penalty shoot-out.

The cup winner secured a place in the 1989–90 European Cup Winners' Cup.

== First preliminary round ==
All the 14 clubs of the Cypriot Third Division and 24 clubs from the Cypriot Fourth Division (6 first of league table of each group the day of draw) participated in the first preliminary round.

Team 1	Score	Team 2
AEK Katholiki (C)	3–0	Ethnikos Latsion (D)
AEM Morphou (D)	2–3	Ayia Napa F.C. (C)
Anagennisi Lythrodonta (D)	1–2	Kentro Neotitas Maroniton (C)
ASO Ormideia (C)	0–3	ENAD (D)
Digenis Agiou Nikolaou (D)	0–3	Ethnikos Assia F.C. (C)
Digenis Akritas Ipsona (C)	6–1	Elia Lythrodonta (D)
Doxa Polemidion (D)	1–2	Neos Aionas Trikomou (C)
ENAN Ayia Napa (D)	4–0	Doxa Devtera (D)
Iraklis Gerolakkou (C)	4–5	Rotsidis Mammari (D)
Kedros Kormakiti (D)	1–2	Fotiakos Frenarou (D)
Kimonas Xylotympou (D)	0–3	Achyronas Liopetriou (D)
Libanos Kormakiti (C)	0–3	PAEEK FC (C)
MEAP Nisou (D)	2–1	AEZ Zakakiou (C)
Olimpiada Neapolis FC (D)	3–0	APEP Pelendriou (D)
Olympos Xylofagou (D)	3–2	AEK Kythreas (D)
Orfeas Athienou (C)	5–2	Th.O.I Avgorou (D)
Othellos Athienou F.C. (C)	3–0	OXEN Peristeronas (C)
P & S Zakakiou (D)	0–1	Apollon Lympion (D)
Tsaggaris Peledriou (D)	4–0	Olympias Lympion (D)

== Second preliminary round ==
The 15 clubs of the Cypriot Second Division advanced directly to the second preliminary round and met the winners of the first preliminary round ties:

Team 1	Score	Team 2
Adonis Idaliou (B)	4–0	ENAD (D)
Alki Larnaca F.C. (B)	3–1	ENAN Ayia Napa (D)
Anagennisi Deryneia (B)	2–0	AEK Katholiki (C)
APEAN Ayia Napa (C)	2–0	Doxa Katokopias F.C. (B)
APEP Limassol (B)	2–0	Orfeas Athienou (C)
Chalkanoras Idaliou (B)	2–1 (a.e.t.)	Fotiakos Frenarou (D)
ENTHOI Lakatamia FC (B)	1–2	Evagoras Paphos (B)
Elpida Xylofagou (B)	1–5	Digenis Akritas Ipsona (C)
Ethnikos Assia F.C. (C)	2–1 (a.e.t.)	Digenis Akritas Morphou (B)
MEAP Nisou (D)	2–2, 1–2 (a.e.t.)	Apollon Lympion (D)
Olympos Xylofagou (D)	1–4	Neos Aionas Trikomou (C)
Onisilos Sotira (B)	1–1, 2–3	Ethnikos Defteras (B)
Orfeas Nicosia (B)	3–2 (a.e.t.)	Akritas Chlorakas (B)
Othellos Athienou F.C. (C)	3–2	Olimpiada Neapolis FC (D)
PAEEK FC (C)	1–0	Kentro Neotitas Maroniton (C)
Rotsidis Mammari (D)	0–2	Achyronas Liopetriou (D)
Tsaggaris Peledriou (D)	2–7	Ermis Aradippou (B)

== First round ==
The 15 clubs of the Cypriot First Division advanced directly to the first round and met the winners of the second preliminary round ties:

Team 1	Agg.	Team 2	1st leg	2nd leg
Adonis Idaliou (B)	2–7	Pezoporikos Larnaca (A)	0–0	2–7
AEL Limassol (A)	1–0	Enosis Neon Paralimni FC (A)	1–0	0–0
Alki Larnaca F.C. (B)	1–4	Nea Salamis Famagusta FC (A)	1–3	0–1
APEP Limassol (B)	8–2	Chalkanoras Idaliou (B)	6–0	2–2
Apollon Limassol (A)	1–2	APOEL FC (A)	1–0	0–2
Digenis Akritas Ipsona (C)	2–3	Anorthosis Famagusta FC (A)	2–3	0–0
Ermis Aradippou (B)	5–1	Ethnikos Assia F.C. (C)	3–1	2–0
Ethnikos Achna FC (A)	2–3	Evagoras Paphos (B)	1–1	1–2
Ethnikos Defteras (B)	4–3	Ayia Napa F.C. (C)	3–2	1–1
Keravnos Strovolou FC (A)	2–5	Achyronas Liopetriou (D)	1–3	1–2
Neos Aionas Trikomou (C)	1–3	Anagennisi Deryneia (B)	1–3	0–0
Olympiakos Nicosia (A)	1–2	Aris Limassol F.C. (A)	0–2	1–0
Omonia Aradippou (A)	0–2	EPA Larnaca FC (A)	0–2	0–0
AC Omonia (A)	7–2	Apollon Lympion (D)	7–2	0–0
Othellos Athienou F.C. (C)	2–4	Orfeas Nicosia (B)	1–2	1–2
PAEEK FC (C)	1–2	APOP Paphos (A)	0–0	1–2

== Second round ==
Team 1	Agg.	Team 2	1st leg	2nd leg
Achyronas Liopetriou (D)	1–5	AC Omonia (A)	1–1	0–4
AEL Limassol (A)	3–1	EPA Larnaca FC (A)	1–0	2–1
Anagennisi Deryneia (B)	3–5	Nea Salamis Famagusta FC (A)	2–2	1–3
Anorthosis Famagusta FC (A)	0–0 (3–4 p)	Pezoporikos Larnaca (A)	0–0	0–0
APOEL FC (A)	3–2	Ethnikos Defteras (B)	2–0	1–2
APOP Paphos (A)	2–2 (a)	Evagoras Paphos (B)	2–1	0–1
Aris Limassol F.C. (A)	8–6	Orfeas Nicosia (B)	3–2	5–4
Ermis Aradippou (B)	1–10	APEP Limassol (B)	0–3	1–7

== Quarter-finals ==
Team 1	Agg.	Team 2	1st leg	2nd leg
APEP Limassol (B)	3–8	AEL Limassol (A)	0–5	3–3
Aris Limassol F.C. (A)	2–2 (9–8 p)	AC Omonia (A)	2–0	0–2
Evagoras Paphos (B)	1–4	Nea Salamis Famagusta FC (A)	1–1	0–3
Pezoporikos Larnaca (A)	2–2 (a)	APOEL FC (A)	2–1	0–1

== Semi-finals ==
Team 1	Agg.	Team 2	1st leg	2nd leg
AEL Limassol (A)	3–2	Nea Salamis Famagusta FC (A)	2–1	1–1
APOEL FC (A)	0–1	Aris Limassol F.C. (A)	0–0	0–1

== Final ==
10 June 1989

AEL	3–2	Aris

Tsirion Stadium, Limassol

Cypriot Cup 1988–89 Winners
AEL Limassol
6th title

== Sources ==
- "1988/89 Cyprus Cup". Rec.Sport.Soccer Statistics Foundation. 2016-01-14.

== See also ==
- Cypriot Cup
- 1988–89 Cypriot First Division
