= 1991–92 Cypriot Cup =

Tournament details
- Country: Cyprus
- Dates: 9 November 1991 – 10 June 1992
- Teams: 72

Final positions
- Champions: Apollon (4th title)

The 1991–92 Cypriot Cup was the 50th edition of the Cypriot Cup. A total of 72 clubs entered the competition. It began on 9 November 1991 with the first preliminary round and concluded on 10 June 1992 with the final which was held at Tsirion Stadium. Apollon won their 4th Cypriot Cup trophy after beating Omonia 1–0 in the final.

== Format ==
In the 1991–92 Cypriot Cup, participated all the teams of the Cypriot First Division, the Cypriot Second Division, the Cypriot Third Division and 30 of the 42 teams of the Cypriot Fourth Division.

The competition consisted of seven knock-out rounds. In the preliminary rounds each tie was played as a single leg and was held at the home ground of one of the two teams, according to the draw results. Each tie winner was qualifying to the next round. If a match was drawn, extra time was following. If extra time was drawn, there was a replay at the ground of the team who were away for the first game. If the rematch was also drawn, then extra time was following and if the match remained drawn after extra time the winner was decided by penalty shoot-out.

The next four rounds were played in a two-legged format, each team playing a home and an away match against their opponent. The team which scored more goals on aggregate, was qualifying to the next round. If the two teams scored the same number of goals on aggregate, then the team which scored more goals away from home was advancing to the next round.

If both teams had scored the same number of home and away goals, then extra time was following after the end of the second leg match. If during the extra thirty minutes both teams had managed to score, but they had scored the same number of goals, then the team who scored the away goals was advancing to the next round (i.e. the team which was playing away). If there weren't scored any goals during extra time, the qualifying team was determined by penalty shoot-out.

The cup winner secured a place in the 1992–93 European Cup Winners' Cup.

== First preliminary round ==
All the 14 clubs of the Cypriot Third Division and 30 clubs from the Cypriot Fourth Division (first ten of the league table of each group at the day of draw) participated in the first preliminary round.

Team 1	Score	Team 2
Ayia Napa F.C. (C)	2–2 (a.e.t.), 1–0	Achyronas Liopetriou (C)
AEK Katholiki (C)	4–0	Olimpiada Neapolis FC (D)
AEZ Zakakiou (D)	7–0	ENTHOI Lakatamia FC (C)
Anagennisi Lythrodonta (D)	1–3	Ethnikos Defteras (C)
ATE PEK Ergaton (D)	2–1	Fotiakos Frenarou (D)
ATE PEK Parekklisias (D)	2–2 (a.e.t.), 1–2	Iraklis Gerolakkou (D)
Digenis Akritas Ipsona (C)	3–2 (a.e.t.)	ASIL Lysi (D)
Doxa Paliometochou (D)	0–3	AEK Kakopetrias (C)
Doxa Polemidion (D)	3–0	Olympos Xylofagou (D)
Ellinismos Akakiou (D)	2–1 (a.e.t.)	Triptolemus Evrychou (D)
Elpida Liopetriou (D)	3–4	Rotsidis Mammari (D)
Elpida Prosfigon Paphou	3–1	Th.O.I Avgorou (D)
Elpida Xylofagou (C)	6–3	Doxa Devtera (D)
ENAP Paphos (D)	0–1	Poseidonas Giolou (D)
Ethnikos Latsion (D)	1–5 (a.e.t.)	Digenis Oroklinis (D)
Kentro Neotitas Maroniton (C)	2–4	Panikos Pourgouridis Lemesou (D)
Keravnos Strovolou FC (C)	2–4	ASO Ormideia (D)
Livadiakos Livadion (D)	3–2 (a.e.t.)	Ermis Aradippou (C)
Olympias Frenarou (D)	2–4	Adonis Idaliou (C)
OXEN Peristeronas (D)	Not conducted^{1}	Adonis Geroskipou (D)
PAEEK FC	4–0	MEAP Nisou (D)
Tsaggaris Peledriou	2–1	Orfeas Athienou (D)

^{1}Adonis Geroskipou did not appear in the stadium.

== Second preliminary round ==
The 14 clubs of the Cypriot Second Division advanced directly to the second preliminary round and met the winners of the first preliminary round ties:

Team 1	Score	Team 2
Ayia Napa F.C. (C)	6–0	Rotsidis Mammari (D)
Akritas Chlorakas (B)	6–1	Adonis Idaliou (C)
Anagennisi Deryneia (B)	3–4	AEK Katholiki (C)
Apollon Lympion (B)	1–2	Digenis Oroklinis (D)
ASO Ormideia (D)	3–5	APEP F.C. (B)
ATE PEK Ergaton (D)	0–1	Livadiakos Livadion (D)
Digenis Akritas Ipsona (C)	2–1	APOP Paphos (B)
Digenis Akritas Morphou (B)	3–0	Ellinismos Akakiou (D)
Doxa Katokopias F.C. (B)	4–1	Tsaggaris Peledriou (C)
Doxa Polemidion (D)	1–0	Elpida Prosfigon Paphou (D)
Elpida Xylofagou (C)	1–3 (a.e.t.)	AEZ Zakakiou (D)
Ethnikos Achna FC (B)	4–2	AEK Kakopetrias (C)
Ethnikos Assia F.C. (B)	0–2	Ethnikos Defteras (C)
Iraklis Gerolakkou (D)	0–1	Othellos Athienou F.C. (B)
Onisilos Sotira (B)	5–0	APEP Pelendriou (B)
Orfeas Nicosia (B)	4–0	Poseidonas Giolou (D)
OXEN Peristeronas (D)	3–1	Panikos Pourgouridis Lemesou (D)
Chalkanoras Idaliou (B)	2–0	PAEEK FC (C)

== First round ==
The 14 clubs of the Cypriot First Division advanced directly to the first round and met the winners of the second preliminary round ties:

Team 1	Agg.	Team 2	1st leg	2nd leg
AEK Katholiki (C)	0–7	Apollon Limassol (A)	0–5	0–2
AEL Limassol (A)	4–1	APEP F.C. (B)	3–0	1–1
Akritas Chlorakas (B)	10–3	Doxa Polemidion (D)	4–0	6–3
Anorthosis Famagusta FC (A)	9–2	Digenis Oroklinis (D)	6–1	3–1
Aris Limassol F.C. (A)	7–0	Ayia Napa F.C. (C)	3–0	4–0
Digenis Akritas Morphou (B)	3–5	Olympiakos Nicosia (A)	1–3	2–2
Doxa Katokopias F.C. (B)	2–9	APOEL FC (A)	1–6	1–3
EPA Larnaca FC (A)	6–5	Chalkanoras Idaliou (B)	2–4	4–1
Ethnikos Achna FC (B)	1–12	Enosis Neon Paralimni FC (A)	0–8	1–4
Evagoras Paphos (A)	6–1	AEZ Zakakiou (D)	2–1	4–0
Livadiakos Livadion (D)	0–7	Alki Larnaca F.C. (A)	0–2	0–5
Omonia Aradippou (A)	10–1	Ethnikos Defteras (C)	6–0	4–1
Onisilos Sotira (B)	1–7	AC Omonia (A)	1–3	0–4
Othellos Athienou F.C. (B)	2–8	Nea Salamis Famagusta FC (A)	1–2	1–6
OXEN Peristeronas (D)	4–5	Digenis Akritas Ipsona (C)	3–2	1–3
Pezoporikos Larnaca (A)	8–0	Orfeas Nicosia (B)	4–0	4–0

== Second round ==
Team 1	Agg.	Team 2	1st leg	2nd leg
AEL Limassol (A)	12–0	Digenis Akritas Ipsona (C)	6–0	6–0
Akritas Chlorakas (B)	2–4	Evagoras Paphos (A)	1–2	1–2
Anorthosis Famagusta FC (A)	2–0	Enosis Neon Paralimni FC (A)	1–0	1–0
APOEL FC (A)	6–0	Alki Larnaca F.C. (A)	1–0	5–0
Apollon Limassol (A)	3–0	Pezoporikos Larnaca (A)	2–0	1–0
EPA Larnaca FC (A)	4–3	Aris Limassol F.C. (A)	2–3	2–0
Omonia Aradippou (A)	3–3 (a)	Nea Salamis Famagusta FC (A)	1–1	2–2
AC Omonia (A)	3–2	Olympiakos Nicosia (A)	3–2	0–0

== Quarter-finals ==
Team 1	Agg.	Team 2	1st leg	2nd leg
AEL Limassol (A)	2–2 (a)	Anorthosis Famagusta FC (A)	1–2	1–0
APOEL FC (A)	3–4	AC Omonia (A)	1–1	2–3
Evagoras Paphos (A)	2–4	EPA Larnaca FC (A)	2–2	0–2
Omonia Aradippou (A)	1–5	Apollon Limassol (A)	0–3	1–2

== Semi-finals ==
Team 1	Agg.	Team 2	1st leg	2nd leg
Apollon Limassol (A)	1–0	Anorthosis Famagusta FC (A)	0–0	1–0
EPA Larnaca FC (A)	1–6	AC Omonia (A)	0–3	1–3

== Final ==
10 June 1992

Apollon	1–0	Omonia

Tsirion Stadium, Limassol

Cypriot Cup 1991–92 Winners
Apollon
4th title

== Sources ==
- "1991/92 Cyprus Cup". Rec.Sport.Soccer Statistics Foundation. 2016-01-14.

== See also ==
- Cypriot Cup
- 1991–92 Cypriot First Division
