= 1989–90 Cypriot Cup =

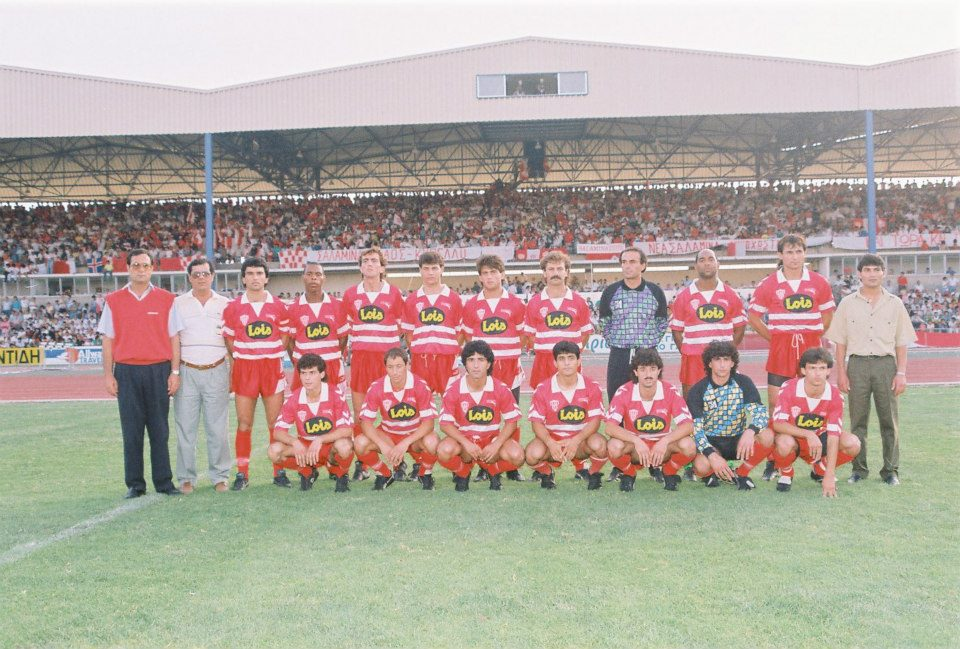
- Nea Salamina Famagusta at 1989-90 Cypriot Cup Final.

Tournament details
- Country: Cyprus
- Dates: 29 November 1989 – 9 June 1990
- Teams: 71

Final positions
- Champions: Nea Salamis (1st title)

The 1989–90 Cypriot Cup was the 48th edition of the Cypriot Cup. A total of 71 clubs entered the competition. It began on 29 November 1989 with the first preliminary round and concluded on 9 June 1990 with the final which was held at Tsirio Stadium. Nea Salamis won their 1st Cypriot Cup trophy after beating Omonia 3–2 in the final.

== Format ==
In the 1989–90 Cypriot Cup, participated all the teams of the Cypriot First Division, the Cypriot Second Division, the Cypriot Third Division and 28 of the 41 teams of the Cypriot Fourth Division.

The competition consisted of seven knock-out rounds. In the preliminary rounds each tie was played as a single leg and was held at the home ground of one of the two teams, according to the draw results. Each tie winner was qualifying to the next round. If a match was drawn, extra time was following. If extra time was drawn, there was a replay at the ground of the team who were away for the first game. If the rematch was also drawn, then extra time was following and if the match remained drawn after extra time the winner was decided by penalty shoot-out.

The next four rounds were played in a two-legged format, each team playing a home and an away match against their opponent. The team which scored more goals on aggregate, was qualifying to the next round. If the two teams scored the same number of goals on aggregate, then the team which scored more goals away from home was advancing to the next round.

If both teams had scored the same number of home and away goals, then extra time was following after the end of the second leg match. If during the extra thirty minutes both teams had managed to score, but they had scored the same number of goals, then the team who scored the away goals was advancing to the next round (i.e. the team which was playing away). If there weren't scored any goals during extra time, the qualifying team was determined by penalty shoot-out.

The cup winner secured a place in the 1990–91 European Cup Winners' Cup.

== First preliminary round ==
All the 14 clubs of the Cypriot Third Division and 28 clubs from the Cypriot Fourth Division (first nine of league table of each group the day of draw and best 10th of all groups) participated in the first preliminary round.

Team 1	Score	Team 2
Achyronas Liopetriou (D)	2–0 (a.e.t.)	Panikos Pourgouridis Lemesou (D)
Adonis Geroskipou (D)	1–2	Olympos Xylofagou (D)
Adonis Idaliou (C)	0–1	ENAN Ayia Napa (D)
AEK Katholiki (C)	2–1	Enosis Neon THOI Lakatamia (C)
AEK Kythreas (D)	3–2	APEAN Ayia Napa (D)
Anagennisi Lythrodonta (D)	3–2	ASO Ormideia (C)
APEP Pelendriou (C)	2–2 (a.e.t.), 0–2	Livadiakos Livadion (D)
APEY Ypsona (D)	3–0	Kentro Neotitas Maroniton (C)
Apollon Lympion (C)	5–1	ATE PEK Ergaton (D)
ASIL Lysi (D)	2–2 (a.e.t.), 0–3	OXEN Peristeronas (C)
Elia Lythrodonta (D)	1–4	Othellos Athienou (C)
Ermis Aradippou (C)	6–4	Olympos Acheritou (D)
Ethnikos Assia F.C. (C)	1–2	Doxa Devtera (D)
Kourio Episkopi (D)	5–2	Kormakitis FC (D)
MEAP Nisou (D)	1–3	Doxa Paliometochou (D)
Olimpiada Neapolis FC (D)	2–0	Tsaggaris Peledriou (D)
Olympias Frenarou (D)	0–1	Fotiakos Frenarou (D)
Olympias Lympion (D)	1–2	Neos Aionas Trikomou (C)
Orfeas Athienou (C)	5–0	APEA Akrotiriou (D)
PAEEK (C)	2–1	Triptolemus Evrychou (D)
Rotsidis Mammari (D)	2–0	Poseidonas Giolou (D)

== Second preliminary round ==
The 15 clubs of the Cypriot Second Division advanced directly to the second preliminary round and met the winners of the first preliminary round ties:

Team 1	Score	Team 2
AEK Katholiki (C)	5–0	ENAN Ayia Napa (D)
AEK Kythreas (D)	1–0	Orfeas Nicosia (B)
Akritas Chlorakas (B)	4–3 (a.e.t.)	Chalkanoras Idaliou (B)
Anagennisi Deryneia (B)	6–0	Olympos Xylofagou (D)
Anagennisi Lythrodonta (D)	1–1, 1–2	Neos Aionas Trikomou (C)
Apollon Lympion (C)	1–0	Doxa Devtera (D)
Digenis Akritas Ipsona (B)	2–0	Achyronas Liopetriou (D)
Digenis Akritas Morphou (B)	0–0, 1–2	PAEEK (C)
Doxa Katokopias (B)	5–0	Doxa Paliometochou (D)
Elpida Xylofagou (B)	3–6	Livadiakos Livadion (D)
EPA Larnaca (B)	3–1	APEP Limassol (B)
Fotiakos Frenarou (D)	4–1	Rotsidis Mammari (D)
Keravnos Strovolou (B)	3–2 (a.e.t.)	Othellos Athienou (C)
Kourio Episkopi (D)	0–3	Ethnikos Defteras (B)
Olimpiada Neapolis (D)	1–2	AEZ Zakakiou (B)
Omonia Aradippou (B)	3–0	Ermis Aradippou (C)
Orfeas Athienou (C)	1–0	Onisilos Sotira (B)
OXEN Peristeronas (C)	0–1	APEY Ypsona (D)

== First round ==
The 14 clubs of the Cypriot First Division advanced directly to the first round and met the winners of the second preliminary round ties:

Team 1	Agg.	Team 2	1st leg	2nd leg
AEK Kythreas (D)	3–12	Alki Larnaca (A)	1–4	2–8
AEL Limassol (A)	2–2 (a)	Ethnikos Achna (A)	0–1	2–1
Akritas Chlorakas (B)	5–1	Apollon Lympion (C)	4–0	1–1
APOEL (A)	7–2	Orfeas Athienou (C)	6–2	1–0
Apollon Limassol (A)	1–3	Pezoporikos Larnaca (A)	0–3	1–0
APOP Paphos (A)	2–3	Olympiakos Nicosia (A)	1–1	1–2
Digenis Akritas Ipsona (B)	3–2	APEY Ypsona (D)	1–1	2–1
Doxa Katokopias (B)	2–6	Anorthosis Famagusta (A)	2–3	0–3
EPA Larnaca (B)	4–5	Enosis Neon Paralimni (A)	1–3	3–2
Ethnikos Defteras (B)	6–2	AEK Katholiki (C)	4–2	2–0
Evagoras Paphos (A)	1–8	Aris Limassol (A)	0–4	1–4
Nea Salamis Famagusta (A)	7–0	Keravnos Strovolou (B)	4–0	3–0
Neos Aionas Trikomou (C)	1–2	Fotiakos Frenarou (D)	1–1	0–1
Omonia Aradippou (B)	3–2	Livadiakos Livadion (D)	1–1	2–1
AC Omonia (A)	10–3	AEZ Zakakiou (B)	9–2	1–1
PAEEK (C)	1–2	Anagennisi Deryneia (B)	1–1	0–1

== Second round ==
Team 1	Agg.	Team 2	1st leg	2nd leg
AEL Limassol (A)	3–4	Olympiakos Nicosia (A)	2–1	1–3 (a.e.t.)
Akritas Chlorakas (B)	0–2	Alki Larnaca (A)	0–2	0–0
Anorthosis Famagusta (A)	3–3 (a)	Aris Limassol (A)	3–2	0–1
APOEL (A)	1–4	Enosis Neon Paralimni (A)	1–1	0–3
Digenis Akritas Ipsona (B)	3–8	Anagennisi Deryneia (B)	2–1	1–7
Ethnikos Defteras (B)	2–3	Omonia Aradippou (B)	1–2	1–1
Nea Salamis Famagusta (A)	12–0	Fotiakos Frenarou (D)	6–0	6–0
AC Omonia (A)	4–3	Pezoporikos Larnaca (A)	2–2	2–1

== Quarter-finals ==
Team 1	Agg.	Team 2	1st leg	2nd leg
Alki Larnaca (A)	2–3	Nea Salamis Famagusta (A)	0–1	2–2
Anagennisi Deryneia (B)	1–7	Aris Limassol (A)	0–1	1–6
Enosis Neon Paralimni (A)	0–5	Olympiakos Nicosia (A)	0–1	0–4
AC Omonia (A)	5–1	Omonia Aradippou (B)	3–0	2–1

== Semi-finals ==
Team 1	Agg.	Team 2	1st leg	2nd leg
Olympiakos Nicosia (A)	2–4	Nea Salamis Famagusta (A)	0–2	2–2
AC Omonia (A)	3–2	Aris Limassol (A)	2–1	1–1

== Final ==
9 June 1990

Nea Salamis	3–2	Omonia
Elia 32'; Mavros 61'; Andreou 71'		Tsikkos 42'; Mičinec 90+5' (pen.)

Tsirio Stadium, Limassol
Referee: Giorgos Kiprianidis

Cypriot Cup 1989–90 Winners
Nea Salamis Famagusta
1st title

== Sources ==
- "1989/90 Cyprus Cup". Rec.Sport.Soccer Statistics Foundation. 2016-01-14.

== Bibliography ==
- Gavreilides, Michalis; Papamoiseos, Stelios (2001). Ένας αιώνας Κυπριακό ποδόσφαιρο [One century Cypriot football] (in Greek). Nicosia: The writer. p. 126. ISBN 9963-8720-1-8.
- Stephanidis, Giorgos (2003). 40 χρόνια κυπριακές ομάδες στην Ευρώπη [40 years Cypriot teams in Europe] (in Greek). Nicosia: Haravgi. p. 203. ISBN 9963-8841-1-3.

== See also ==
- Cypriot Cup
- 1989–90 Cypriot First Division
