= 1990–91 Cypriot Second Division =

Cypriot Second Division
- Season: 1990–91
- Champions: Evagoras (5th title)
- Promoted: Evagoras; Omonia Ar.
- Relegated: Ermis; Ethnikos Def.; Elpida
- Matches played: 182
- Goals scored: 633 (3.48 per match)

The 1990–91 Cypriot Second Division was the 36th season of the Cypriot second-level football league. Evagoras won their 5th title.

== Format ==
Fourteen teams participated in the 1990–91 Cypriot Second Division. All teams played against each other twice, once at their home and once away. The team with the most points at the end of the season crowned champions. The first two teams were promoted to 1991–92 Cypriot First Division. The last two teams were relegated to the 1991–92 Cypriot Third Division.

The 3rd-placed team faced the 12th-placed team of the 1990–91 Cypriot First Division, in a two-legged relegation play-off for one spot in the 1991–92 Cypriot First Division. The 12th-placed team faced the 3rd-placed team of the 1990–91 Cypriot Third Division, in a two-legged relegation play-off for one spot in the 1991–92 Cypriot Second Division.

== Changes from previous season ==
Teams promoted to 1990–91 Cypriot First Division

- EPA Larnaca
- APEP

Teams relegated from 1989–90 Cypriot First Division

- Evagoras Paphos
- Ethnikos Achna

Teams promoted from 1989–90 Cypriot Third Division

- APEP Pelendriou
- Ermis Aradippou

Teams relegated to 1990–91 Cypriot Third Division

- AEZ Zakakiou
- Keravnos
- Digenis Ipsona

== League standings ==
Pos	Team	Pld	W	D	L	GF	GA	GD	Pts	Promotion or relegation
1	Evagoras Paphos (C, P)	26	15	10	1	43	18	+25	40	Promoted to Cypriot First Division
2	Omonia Aradippou (P)	26	17	5	4	63	20	+43	39	Promoted to Cypriot First Division
3	Ethnikos Achna	26	15	4	7	76	33	+43	34	Qualification for promotion play-off
4	Digenis Morphou	26	10	9	7	37	30	+7	29	
5	Akritas Chlorakas	26	11	5	10	41	35	+6	27	
6	Anagennisi Deryneia	26	10	6	10	51	39	+12	26	
7	Onisilos Sotira	26	10	6	10	44	45	−1	26	
8	APEP Pelendriou	26	7	11	8	45	43	+2	25	
9	Chalkanoras Idaliou	26	11	3	12	51	52	−1	25	
10	Doxa Katokopias	26	9	6	11	49	46	+3	24	
11	Orfeas Nicosia	26	8	8	10	45	47	−2	24	
12	Ermis Aradippou (R)	26	8	6	12	29	45	−16	22	Qualification for relegation play-off
13	Ethnikos Defteras (R)	26	5	7	14	39	75	−36	17	Relegated to Cypriot Third Division
14	Elpida Xylofagou (R)	26	2	2	22	20	105	−85	6	Relegated to Cypriot Third Division

Rules for classification: 1) Points, 2) Goal differences, 3) Goal for. Points system: Won=2 points, Drawn=1 point, Lost=0 points.
(C) Champions; (P) Promoted; (R) Relegated

== Playoff ==
=== Promotion playoff ===
The 3rd-placed team, Ethnikos Achna, faced the 12th-placed team of the 1990–91 Cypriot First Division, Enosis Neon Paralimni, in a two-legged relegation play-off for one spot in the 1991–92 Cypriot First Division. Enosis Neon Paralimni won both matches and secured their place in the 1991–92 Cypriot First Division.

- Enosis Neon Paralimni 4–0 Ethnikos Achna
- Ethnikos Achna 1–3 Enosis Neon Paralimni

=== Relegation playoff ===
The 12th-placed team, Ermis Aradippou, faced the 3rd-placed team of the 1990–91 Cypriot Third Division, Apollon Lympion, in a two-legged relegation play-off for one spot in the 1991–92 Cypriot Second Division. Apollon Lympion won the playoff and secured their place in the 1991–92 Cypriot Second Division.

- Ermis Aradippou 0–1 Apollon Lympion
- Apollon Lympion 1–1 Ermis Aradippou

== See also ==
- Cypriot Second Division
- 1990–91 Cypriot First Division
- 1990–91 Cypriot Cup

== Sources ==
- "1990/91 Cypriot Second Division". Rec.Sport.Soccer Statistics Foundation. 2016-01-14.
