= 1989–90 Cypriot Second Division =

Cypriot Second Division
- Season: 1989–90
- Champions: EPA Larnaca (1st title)
- Promoted: EPA Larnaca; APEP FC
- Relegated: AEZ Zakakiou; Keravnos Strovolou FC; Digenis Akritas Ipsona

The 1989–90 Cypriot Second Division was the 35th season of the Cypriot second-level football league. EPA Larnaca won their 1st title.

== Format ==
Fifteen teams participated in the 1989–90 Cypriot Second Division. All teams played against each other twice, once at their home and once away. The team with the most points at the end of the season crowned champions. The first two teams were promoted to 1990–91 Cypriot First Division. The last three teams were relegated to the 1990–91 Cypriot Third Division.

== Changes from previous season ==
Teams promoted to 1989–90 Cypriot First Division

- Evagoras Paphos
- Alki Larnaca FC

Teams relegated from 1988–89 Cypriot First Division

- EPA Larnaca FC
- Keravnos Strovolou FC
- Omonia Aradippou

Teams promoted from 1988–89 Cypriot Third Division

- Digenis Akritas Ipsona
- AEZ Zakakiou

Teams relegated to 1989–90 Cypriot Third Division

- Adonis Idaliou
- ENTHOI Lakatamia FC
- Ermis Aradippou FC

== League standings ==
Pos	Team	Pld	W	D	L	GF	GA	GD	Pts	Promotion or relegation
1	EPA Larnaca FC (C, P)	28	–	–	–	84	28	+56	45	Promoted to Cypriot First Division
2	APEP FC (P)	28	–	–	–	60	24	+36	43	Promoted to Cypriot First Division
3	Chalkanoras Idaliou	28	–	–	–	52	41	+11	33	
4	Omonia Aradippou	28	–	–	–	39	36	+3	31	
5	Anagennisi Deryneia FC	28	–	–	–	49	42	+7	29	
6	Digenis Akritas Morphou FC	28	–	–	–	36	38	−2	29	
7	Elpida Xylofagou	28	–	–	–	39	41	−2	27	
8	Ethnikos Defteras	28	–	–	–	39	47	−8	27	
9	Onisilos Sotira	28	–	–	–	41	51	−10	27	
10	Doxa Katokopias FC	28	–	–	–	35	51	−16	27	
11	Akritas Chlorakas	28	–	–	–	29	27	+2	26	
12	Orfeas Nicosia	28	–	–	–	39	41	−2	23	
13	AEZ Zakakiou (R)	28	–	–	–	28	42	−14	21	Relegated to Cypriot Third Division
14	Keravnos Strovolou FC (R)	28	–	–	–	23	46	−23	20	Relegated to Cypriot Third Division
15	Digenis Akritas Ipsona (R)	28	–	–	–	23	58	−35	12	Relegated to Cypriot Third Division

Rules for classification: 1) Points, 2) Goal differences, 3) Goal for. Points system: Won=2 points, Drawn=1 point, Lost=0 points.
(C) Champions; (P) Promoted; (R) Relegated

== See also ==
- Cypriot Second Division
- 1989–90 Cypriot First Division
- 1989–90 Cypriot Cup
