= 1988–89 Cypriot Second Division =

Cypriot Second Division
- Season: 1988–89
- Champions: Evagoras Paphos (4th title)
- Promoted: Evagoras Paphos; Alki Larnaca FC
- Relegated: Adonis Idaliou; ENTHOI Lakatamia FC; Ermis Aradippou FC

The 1988–89 Cypriot Second Division was the 34th season of the Cypriot second-level football league. Evagoras Paphos won their 4th title.

== Format ==
Fifteen teams participated in the 1988–89 Cypriot Second Division. All teams played against each other twice, once at their home and once away. The team with the most points at the end of the season crowned champions. The first two teams were promoted to 1989–90 Cypriot First Division. The last three teams were relegated to the 1989–90 Cypriot Third Division.

== Changes from previous season ==
Teams promoted to 1988–89 Cypriot First Division

- Keravnos Strovolou FC
- Omonia Aradippou

Teams relegated from 1987–88 Cypriot First Division

- APEP FC
- Alki Larnaca FC
- Anagennisi Deryneia FC

Teams promoted from 1987–88 Cypriot Third Division

- Digenis Akritas Morphou FC
- Chalkanoras Idaliou

Teams relegated to 1988–89 Cypriot Third Division

- Digenis Akritas Ipsona
- PAEEK FC
- Othellos Athienou FC

== League standings ==
Pos	Team	Pld	W	D	L	GF	GA	GD	Pts	Promotion or relegation
1	Evagoras Paphos (C, P)	28	–	–	–	65	29	+36	39	Promoted to Cypriot First Division
2	Alki Larnaca FC (P)	28	–	–	–	43	19	+24	37	Promoted to Cypriot First Division
3	APEP FC	28	–	–	–	35	33	+2	33	
4	Anagennisi Deryneia FC	28	–	–	–	51	31	+20	32	
5	Doxa Katokopias FC	28	–	–	–	22	27	−5	27	
6	Orfeas Nicosia	28	–	–	–	35	43	−8	27	
7	Chalkanoras Idaliou	28	–	–	–	35	32	+3	26	
8	Elpida Xylofagou	28	–	–	–	35	40	−5	26	
9	Digenis Akritas Morphou FC	28	–	–	–	27	32	−5	26	
10	Onisilos Sotira	28	–	–	–	33	41	−8	26	
11	Akritas Chlorakas	28	–	–	–	29	37	−8	26	
12	Ethnikos Defteras	28	–	–	–	22	32	−10	26	
13	Adonis Idaliou (R)	28	–	–	–	29	35	−6	25	Relegated to Cypriot Third Division
14	ENTHOI Lakatamia FC (R)	28	–	–	–	31	36	−5	24	Relegated to Cypriot Third Division
15	Ermis Aradippou FC (R)	28	–	–	–	34	57	−23	20	Relegated to Cypriot Third Division

Rules for classification: 1) Points, 2) Goal differences, 3) Goal for. Points system: Won=2 points, Drawn=1 point, Lost=0 points.
(C) Champions; (P) Promoted; (R) Relegated

== See also ==
- Cypriot Second Division
- 1988–89 Cypriot First Division
- 1988–89 Cypriot Cup
