= 1988–89 Cypriot Fourth Division =

Cypriot Fourth Division
- Season: 1988–89
- Champions: AEK Kythreas; Enosis Neon Ayia Napa; APEP Pelendriou; Apollon Lympion (1st title)
- Promoted: APEP Pelendriou; Apollon Lympion
- Relegated: Enosis Kokkinotrimithia; Spartakos Kitiou; AMEAN Agiou Nikolaou; Parideio Larnaca; Panikos & Sokratis Zakakiou; AOL – Omonia Lakatamias; Ethnikos Latsion FC

The 1988–89 Cypriot Fourth Division was the fourth season of the Cypriot fourth-level football league. The championship was split into four groups. The winners were:

- Group A: AEK Kythreas
- Group B: Enosis Neon Ayia Napa
- Group C: APEP Pelendriou
- Group D: Apollon Lympion

The four winners gave playoff matches and the two first were promoted to the 1989–90 Cypriot Third Division. Seven teams were relegated to regional leagues.

== See also ==
- Cypriot Fourth Division
- 1988–89 Cypriot First Division
- 1988–89 Cypriot Cup
