= 1972–73 Cypriot Cup =

Tournament details
- Country: Cyprus
- Dates: 13 May 1973 – 17 June 1973
- Teams: 36

Final positions
- Champions: APOEL (8th title)
- Runners-up: Pezoporikos Larnaca

The 1972–73 Cypriot Cup was the 31st edition of the Cypriot Cup. A total of 36 clubs entered the competition. It began on 13 May 1973 with the preliminary round and concluded on 17 June 1973 with the final which was held at GSP Stadium. APOEL won their 8th Cypriot Cup trophy after beating Pezoporikos Larnaca 1–0 in the final.

== Format ==
In the 1972–73 Cypriot Cup, participated all the teams of the Cypriot First Division, the Cypriot Second Division and 8 of the 14 teams of the Cypriot Third Division (first eight of the league table; cup took place after the end of the league).

The competition consisted of six knock-out rounds. In all rounds each tie was played as a single leg and was held at the home ground of one of the two teams, according to the draw results. Each tie winner was qualifying to the next round. If a match was drawn, extra time was following. If extra time was drawn, there was a replay at the ground of the team who were away for the first game. If the rematch was also drawn, then extra time was following and if the match remained drawn after extra time the winner was decided by penalty shoot-out.

The cup winner secured a place in the 1973–74 European Cup Winners' Cup.

== Preliminary round ==
In the preliminary round participated 8 teams of 1972–73 Cypriot Third Division.

Team 1	Result	Team 2
(C) Doxa Katokopias	0 - 2	Ermis Aradippou (C)
(C) Iraklis Gerolakkou	0 - 1	ENAZ Agia Zoni Limassol (C)
(C) AEK Karava	0 - 3	AEK Kythreas (C)
(C) Neos Aionas Trikomou	1 - 0	Faros Acropoleos (C)

== First round ==
14 clubs from the 1972–73 Cypriot First Division and 14 clubs from the 1972–73 Cypriot Second Division were added.

Team 1	Result	Team 2
(B) AEK Ammochostos	3 - 4	APOEL (A)
(A) AEL Limassol	2 - 0	Ethnikos Achna (B)
(A) Alki Larnaca	4 - 1	Orfeas Nicosia (B)
(A) Anorthosis Famagusta	4 - 0	Othellos Athienou (B)
(A) Apollon Limassol	2 - 0	Digenis Akritas Morphou (A)
(B) APOP Paphos	2 - 3	Chalkanoras Idaliou (B)
(B) Omonia Aradippou	0 - 3	Enosis Neon Paralimni (A)
(B) Ethnikos Asteras Limassol	1 - 1, 1 - 3	AEK Kythreas (C)
(B) ENAD Ayiou Dometiou	1 - 4	PAEEK (B)
(C) Ermis Aradippou	0 - 1	ENAZ Agia Zoni Limassol (C)
(A) Evagoras Paphos	2 - 1	ASIL Lysi (A)
(B) Keravnos Strovolou	1 - 1, 1 - 5	Ethnikos Assia (B)
(C) Neos Aionas Trikomou	0 - 1	Aris Limassol (A)
(A) Olympiakos Nicosia	1 - 1, 3 - 1	EPA Larnaca (A)
(B) Parthenon Zodeia	0 - 3	Nea Salamis Famagusta FC (A)
(A) Pezoporikos Larnaca	9 - 2	AEM Morphou (B)

== Second round ==
Team 1	Result	Team 2
(A) AEL Limassol	1 - 0	Apollon Limassol (A)
(A) Aris Limassol	3 - 0	ENAZ Agia Zoni Limassol (C)
(A) Evagoras Paphos	0 - 2	Alki Larnaca (A)
(C) AEK Kythreas	0 - 0, 0 - 5	Anorthosis Famagusta (A)
(B) PAEEK	0 - 3	APOEL (A)
(A) Enosis Neon Paralimni	3 - 1	Ethnikos Assia (B)
(A) Nea Salamis Famagusta	0 - 2	Pezoporikos Larnaca (A)
(B) Chalkanoras Idaliou	1 - 3	Olympiakos Nicosia (A)

== Quarter-finals ==
Team 1	Result	Team 2
(A) AEL Limassol	0 - 2	Pezoporikos Larnaca (A)
(A) APOEL	2 - 1	Alki Larnaca (A)
(A) Aris Limassol	2 - 0	Enosis Neon Paralimni (A)
(A) Olympiakos Nicosia	2 - 0	Anorthosis Famagusta (A)

== Semi-finals ==
Team 1	Result	Team 2
(A) APOEL	1 - 0	Aris Limassol (A)
(A) Olympiakos Nicosia	0 - 1	Pezoporikos Larnaca (A)

== Final ==
17 June 1973

APOEL	1–0	Pezoporikos
Andreas Stylianou 12'

GSP Stadium, Nicosia

Cypriot Cup 1972–73 Winners
APOEL
8th title

== Sources ==
- "1972/73 Cyprus Cup". Rec.Sport.Soccer Statistics Foundation. 2017-08-24.

== Bibliography ==
- Gavreilides, Michalis; Papamoiseos, Stelios (2001). Ένας αιώνας Κυπριακό ποδόσφαιρο [One century Cypriot football] (in Greek). Nicosia: The writer. pp. 92–93. ISBN 9963-8720-1-8.
- Stephanidis, Giorgos (2003). 40 χρόνια κυπριακές ομάδες στην Ευρώπη [40 years Cypriot teams in Europe] (in Greek). Nicosia: Haravgi. p. 76. ISBN 9963-8841-1-3.

== See also ==
- Cypriot Cup
- 1972–73 Cypriot First Division
