= 1990–91 Cypriot Fourth Division =

Cypriot Fourth Division
- Season: 1990–91
- Champions: AEK Kakopetrias; Kentro Neotitas Maroniton; Achyronas Liopetriou
- Promoted: AEK Kakopetrias; Kentro Neotitas Maroniton; Achyronas Liopetriou
- Relegated: AEK Kythreas; APOP Palechoriou; APEA Akrotiriou; Panikos & Sokratis Zakakiou; Kimonas Xylotympou; Evagoras Avgorou; Omonia Ormideia

The 1990–91 Cypriot Fourth Division was the sixth season of the Cypriot fourth-level football league. The championship was split into three geographical groups, representing the Districts of Cyprus. The winners were:

- Nicosia-Keryneia Group: AEK Kakopetrias
- Larnaca-Famagusta Group: Achyronas Liopetriou
- Limassol-Paphos Group: Kentro Neotitas Maroniton

The three winners were promoted to the 1991–92 Cypriot Third Division. Seven teams were relegated to regional leagues.

== See also ==
- Cypriot Fourth Division
- 1990–91 Cypriot First Division
- 1990–91 Cypriot Cup
