= Omonia Ormideia =

Cypriot football club

- Founded: 1956; 69 years ago
- Ground: Ormideia Municipality Stadium

Omonia Ormideia is a Cypriot association football club based in Ormideia, located in the Larnaca District. Its stadium is the Ormideia Municipality Stadium.

Omonia Ormideia at CFA's competitions.
Season	League										Cup	
Season	Division	Position	Teams	Played	Won	Drawn	Lost	Goals		Points	Competition	Round
Season	Division	Position	Teams	Played	Won	Drawn	Lost	For	Against	Points	Competition	Round
1989–90	Cypriot Fourth Division	12	14	26				25	50	18	Cypriot Cup	Not participated
1990–91	Cypriot Fourth Division	15	15	28				31	54	19	Cypriot Cup	Not participated
Points: Won=3 points, Drawn=1 points, Lost=0 points
