= European Golden Shoe =

Annual association football award

- Lionel Messi's 2012–13 Golden Shoe
- Awarded for: Leading goalscorer from the top division of a European national league
- Presented by: L'Équipe (1968–1991); European Sports Media (1997–present)
- First award: 1968
- Currently held by: (England) Harry Kane (2nd win)

Highlights
- Most wins: (Argentina) Lionel Messi (6 wins)

The European Golden Shoe, also known as the European Golden Boot, is an award that is presented each season to the player with the most points in matches of the top divisions of European national association football leagues. The trophy is a sculpture of a football boot. The award, originally called Soulier d'Or, French for Golden Shoe, was launched in the 1967–68 season, and was given to the top goalscorer in all European leagues during a season. Since 1997, it has been calculated using a weighting in favour of the highest ranked leagues. Originally presented by L'Équipe newspaper, it has been awarded by the European Sports Media since the 1996–97 season. Lionel Messi has won the award a record six times, more than any other player in history.

== History ==
Between 1968 and 1991, the award was given to the highest goalscorer in any European league. This was regardless of the strength of the league and the number of games in which the player had taken part. During this period Eusébio, Gerd Müller, Dudu Georgescu and Fernando Gomes each won the Golden Shoe twice.

Following a protest from the Cyprus FA, which claimed that a Cypriot player with 40 goals should have received the award (though the official top scorers for the season are both listed with 19 goals), L'Équipe issued no awards between 1991 and 1996.

Since the 1996–97 season, European Sports Media have awarded the Golden Shoe based on a points system that allows players in stronger leagues to win even if they score fewer goals than a player in a weaker league. The weightings are determined by the league's ranking on the UEFA coefficients, which in turn depend on the results of each league's clubs in European competition over the previous five seasons. Goals scored in the top five leagues according to the UEFA coefficients list are multiplied by two, goals scored in the leagues ranked 6 to 22 (previously 9 to 21) are multiplied by 1.5, and goals scored in leagues ranked 22 and below are multiplied by 1. Thus, goals scored in higher-ranked leagues count for more than those scored in weaker leagues. Since this change, there have only been two winners who were not playing in one of the top five leagues (Henrik Larsson, 2000–01 Scottish Premier League and Mario Jardel, 1998–99 Primeira Divisão and 2001–02 Primeira Liga).

Although the Golden Shoe could be shared among multiple players in the past, in the 2019–20 season this rule was changed to give the award to the player with the least minutes played, should there be a tie on points. If tie persists, number of league assists and, then, the fewer penalties scored, would be counted. If the tie ultimately persists, the award would be shared.

== Winners ==
Player (X)	Denotes the number of times the player had won the award at that time (for players with more than one award)
	Denotes player's club won league that season
	Player also top goalscorer in all European leagues (since 1996–97)

European Golden Shoe winners
Season	Player	Club	League	Goals	Points
**Winners awarded by L'Équipe (1968–1991)**
1967–68	(Portugal) Eusébio (1)	Benfica	(Portugal) Primeira Liga	42	—
1968–69	(Bulgaria) Petar Zhekov	CSKA Sofia	(Bulgaria) Parva Liga	36	—
1969–70	(West Germany) Gerd Müller (1)	Bayern Munich	(Germany) Bundesliga	38	—
1970–71	(Socialist Federal Republic of Yugoslavia) Josip Skoblar	Marseille	(France) Ligue 1	44	—
1971–72	(West Germany) Gerd Müller (2)	Bayern Munich	(Germany) Bundesliga	40	—
1972–73	(Portugal) Eusébio (2)	Benfica	(Portugal) Primeira Liga	40	—
1973–74	(Argentina) Héctor Yazalde	Sporting CP	(Portugal) Primeira Liga	46	—
1974–75	(Romania) Dudu Georgescu (1)	Dinamo București	(Romania) Liga I	33	—
1975–76	(Cyprus) Sotiris Kaiafas	Omonia Nicosia	(Cyprus) Cypriot First Division	39	—
1976–77	(Romania) Dudu Georgescu (2)	Dinamo București	(Romania) Liga I	47	—
1977–78	(Austria) Hans Krankl	Rapid Wien	(Austria) Austrian Bundesliga	41	—
1978–79	(Netherlands) Kees Kist	AZ	(Netherlands) Eredivisie	34	—
1979–80	(Belgium) Erwin Vandenbergh	Lierse	(Belgium) Belgian First Division	39	—
1980–81	(Bulgaria) Georgi Slavkov	Botev Plovdiv	(Bulgaria) Parva Liga	31	—
1981–82	(Netherlands) Wim Kieft	Ajax	(Netherlands) Eredivisie	32	—
1982–83	(Portugal) Fernando Gomes (1)	Porto	(Portugal) Primeira Liga	36	—
1983–84	(Wales) Ian Rush	Liverpool	(England) First Division	32	—
1984–85	(Portugal) Fernando Gomes (2)	Porto	(Portugal) Primeira Liga	39	—
1985–86	(Netherlands) Marco van Basten	Ajax	(Netherlands) Eredivisie	37	—
1986–87	(Austria) Toni Polster (Note: Original 1986–87 season winner Rodion Cămătaru (with 44 goals) was disqualified later and the trophy was awarded to Polster in 1990. However, Cămătaru was allowed to keep his copy of the trophy.)	Austria Wien	(Austria) Austrian Bundesliga	39	—
1987–88	(Turkey) Tanju Çolak	Galatasaray	(Turkey) Süper Lig	39	—
1988–89	(Romania) Dorin Mateuț	Dinamo București	(Romania) Liga I	43	—
1989–90	(Bulgaria) Hristo Stoichkov	CSKA Sofia	(Bulgaria) A PFG	38	—
1989–90	(Mexico) Hugo Sánchez	Real Madrid	(Spain) La Liga	38	—
1990–91 (Note: Darko Pančev got his prize for 1990–91 season later, only in 2006, following a protest from Cyprus where a player supposedly scored 40 goals (though the official topscorers for the season, Suad Beširević and Panayiotis Xiourouppas, are listed with 19 goals each). Due to this affair, France Football decided to make the competition unofficial.)	(Socialist Federal Republic of Yugoslavia) Darko Pančev	Red Star Belgrade	(Socialist Federal Republic of Yugoslavia) Yugoslav First League	34	—
1991–1992	Not awarded				
1992–1993	Not awarded				
1993–1994	Not awarded				
1994–1995	Not awarded				
1995–1996	Not awarded				
**Winners awarded by European Sports Media (1997–present)**
1996–97	(Brazil) Ronaldo	Barcelona	(Spain) La Liga	34	68
1997–98	(Greece) Nikos Machlas	Vitesse	(Netherlands) Eredivisie	34	68
1998–99	(Brazil) Mário Jardel (1)	Porto	(Portugal) Primeira Liga	36	54
1999–2000	(England) Kevin Phillips	Sunderland	(England) Premier League	30	60
2000–01	(Sweden) Henrik Larsson	Celtic	(Scotland) Scottish Premier League	35	52.5
2001–02	(Brazil) Mário Jardel (2)	Sporting CP	(Portugal) Primeira Liga	42	63
2002–03	(Netherlands) Roy Makaay	Deportivo La Coruña	(Spain) La Liga	29	58
2003–04	(France) Thierry Henry (1)	Arsenal	(England) Premier League	30	60
2004–05	(France) Thierry Henry (2)	Arsenal	(England) Premier League	25	50
2004–05	(Uruguay) Diego Forlán (1)	Villarreal	(Spain) La Liga	25	50
2005–06	(Italy) Luca Toni	Fiorentina	(Italy) Serie A	31	62
2006–07	(Italy) Francesco Totti	Roma	(Italy) Serie A	26	52
2007–08	(Portugal) Cristiano Ronaldo (1)	Manchester United	(England) Premier League	31	62
2008–09	(Uruguay) Diego Forlán (2)	Atlético Madrid	(Spain) La Liga	32	64
2009–10	(Argentina) Lionel Messi (1)	Barcelona	(Spain) La Liga	34	68
2010–11	(Portugal) Cristiano Ronaldo (2)	Real Madrid	(Spain) La Liga	40	80
2011–12	(Argentina) Lionel Messi (2)	Barcelona	(Spain) La Liga	50	100
2012–13	(Argentina) Lionel Messi (3)	Barcelona	(Spain) La Liga	46	92
2013–14	(Uruguay) Luis Suárez (1)	Liverpool	(England) Premier League	31	62
2013–14	(Portugal) Cristiano Ronaldo (3)	Real Madrid	(Spain) La Liga	31	62
2014–15	(Portugal) Cristiano Ronaldo (4)	Real Madrid	(Spain) La Liga	48	96
2015–16	(Uruguay) Luis Suárez (2)	Barcelona	(Spain) La Liga	40	80
2016–17	(Argentina) Lionel Messi (4)	Barcelona	(Spain) La Liga	37	74
2017–18	(Argentina) Lionel Messi (5)	Barcelona	(Spain) La Liga	34	68
2018–19	(Argentina) Lionel Messi (6)	Barcelona	(Spain) La Liga	36	72
2019–20	(Italy) Ciro Immobile	Lazio	(Italy) Serie A	36	72
2020–21	(Poland) Robert Lewandowski (1)	Bayern Munich	(Germany) Bundesliga	41	82
2021–22	(Poland) Robert Lewandowski (2)	Bayern Munich	(Germany) Bundesliga	35	70
2022–23	(Norway) Erling Haaland	Manchester City	(England) Premier League	36	72
2023–24	(England) Harry Kane (1)	Bayern Munich	(Germany) Bundesliga	36	72
2024–25	(France) Kylian Mbappé	Real Madrid	(Spain) La Liga	31	62
2025–26	(England) Harry Kane (2)	Bayern Munich	(Germany) Bundesliga	36	72

=== Multiple winners ===
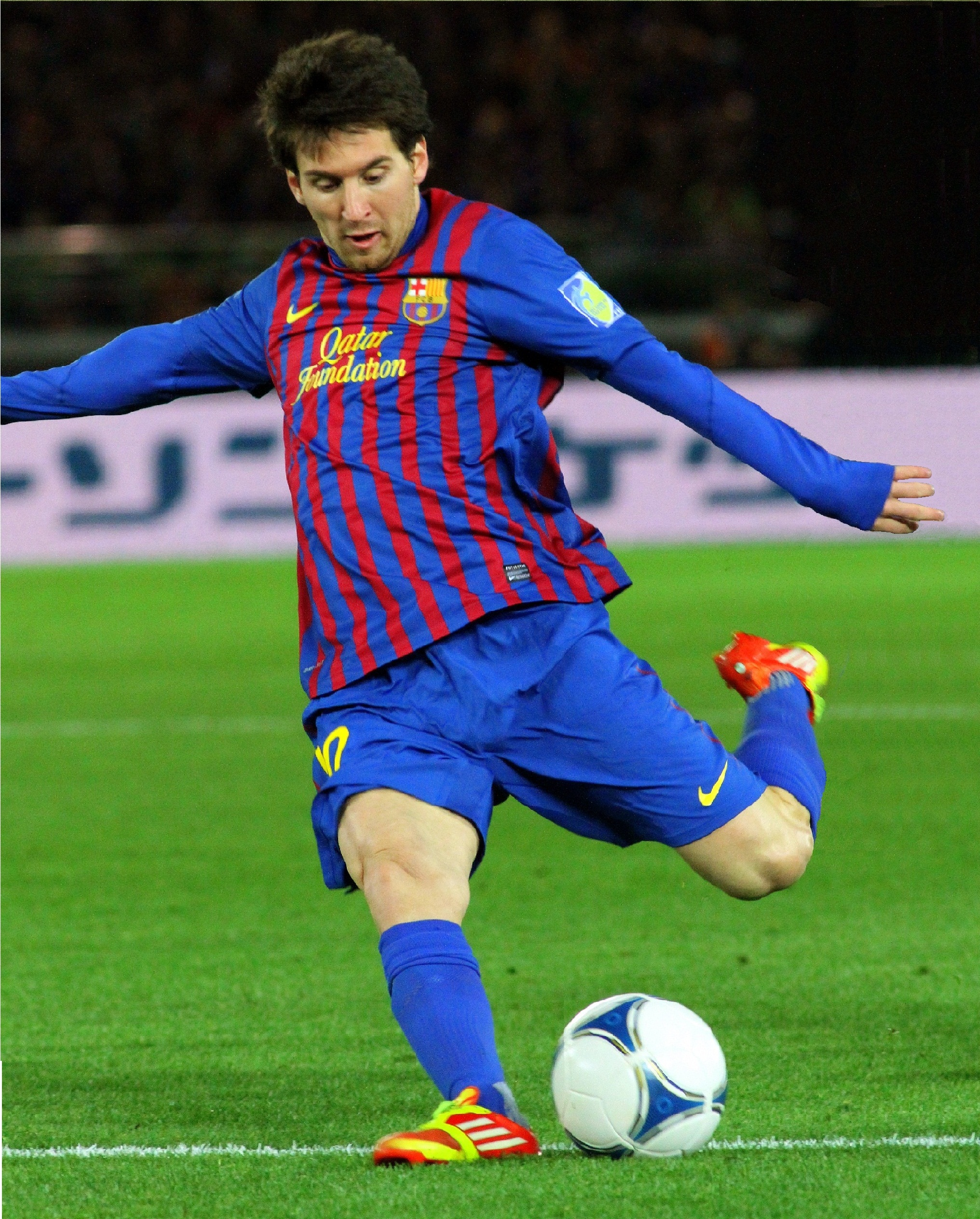
Lionel Messi is the all-time record winner of the award, having won it six times overall. He also holds the record for most goals and most points in a single season—50 and 100 respectively, in 2011–12.

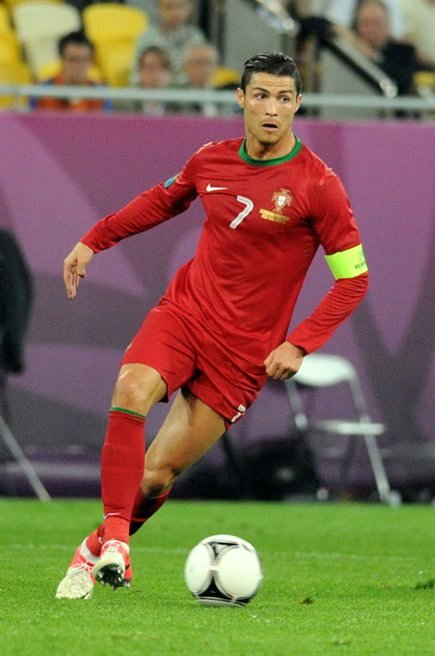
Cristiano Ronaldo is second on the all-time list, having won four Golden Shoes. His record is 48 goals and 96 points respectively, in 2014–15.

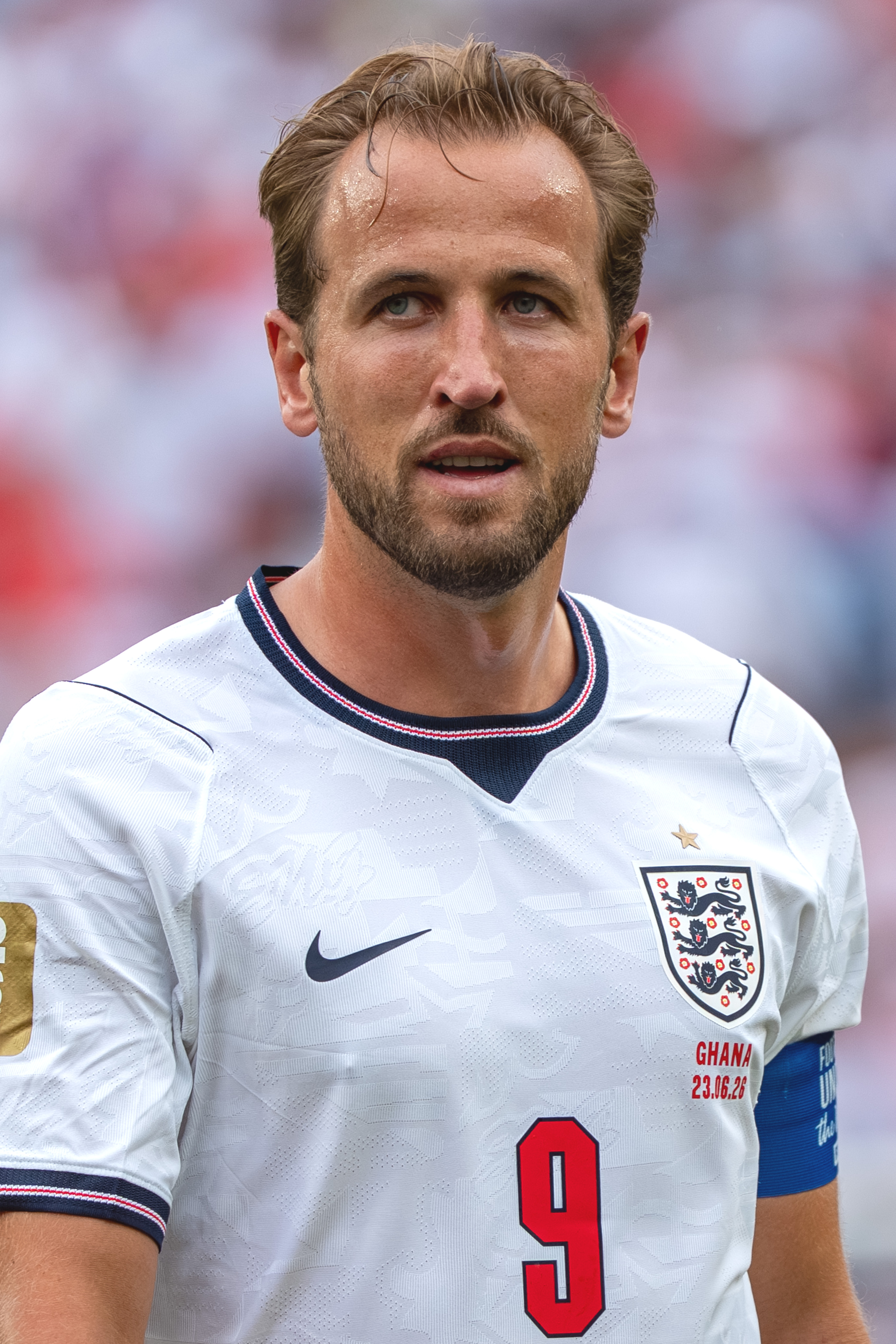
Harry Kane is the first English player to win multiple times in 2024 and 2026

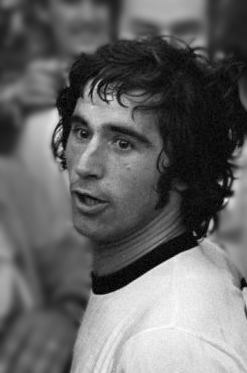
Gerd Müller was the first player to win the award twice, in 1970 and 1972.

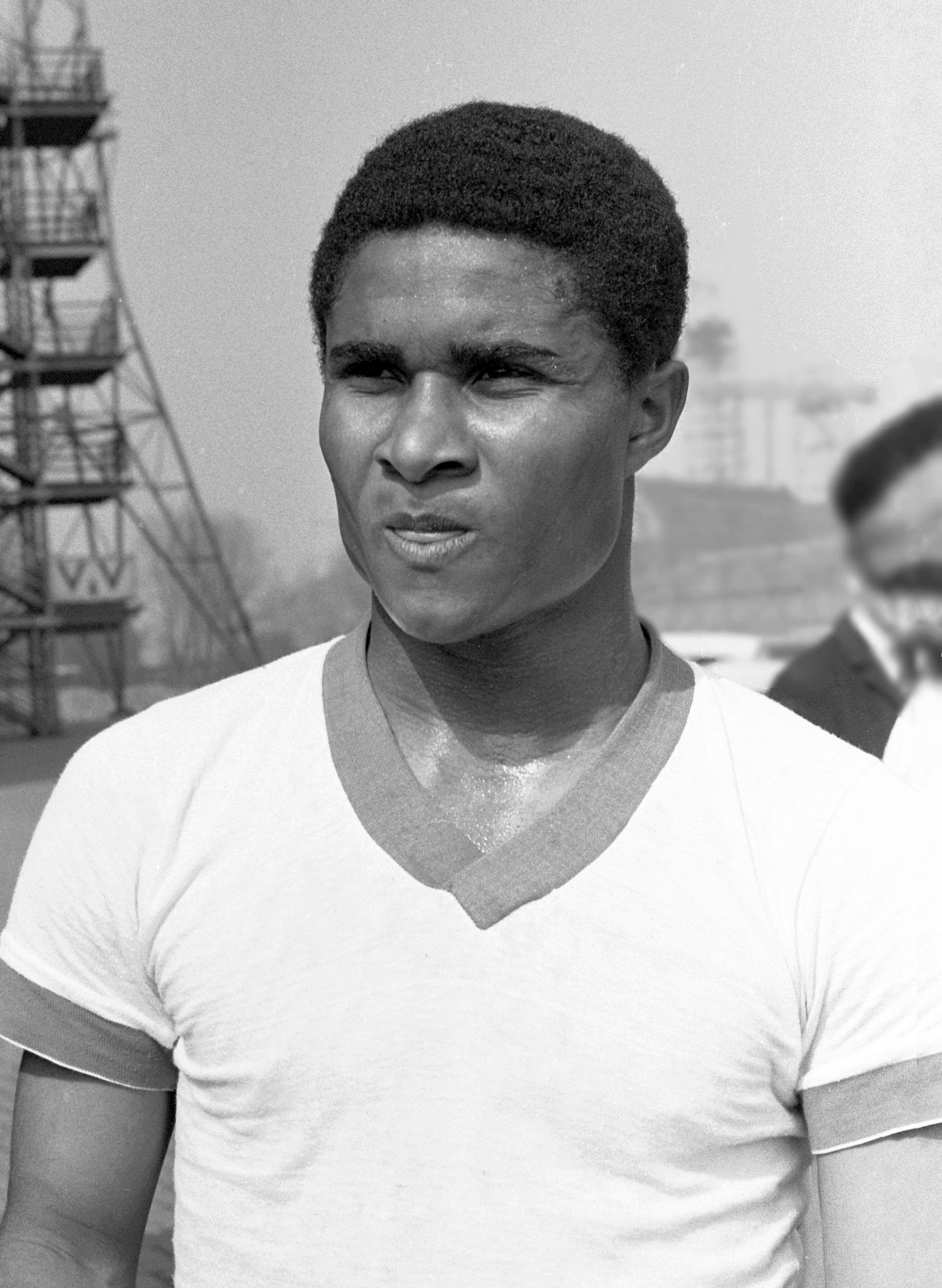
Eusébio was the first winner of the prize in 1968.

Lionel Messi is the only player to win the award six times, all with Barcelona. He also holds the all-time record for goals in a single season with 50 in 2011–12, which accumulated to a record 100 points. Bayern Munich's Gerd Müller was the first player to win the award twice, in 1969–70 and 1971–72. Messi was the first player to win the award three times. Cristiano Ronaldo was the first player to win the award four times. Messi was the first and so far only player to win it five and six times. Only Messi (2016–17, 2017–18 and 2018–19) has won the award in three consecutive seasons. Thierry Henry (2003–04 and 2004–05), Messi (2011–12 and 2012–13; 2016–17, 2017–18 and 2018–19), Cristiano Ronaldo (2013–14 and 2014–15) and Robert Lewandowski (2020–21 and 2021–22) have won the award in consecutive seasons. Diego Forlán (Villarreal and Atlético Madrid), Luis Suárez (Liverpool and Barcelona), Mário Jardel (Porto and Sporting CP) and Ronaldo (Manchester United and Real Madrid) are the only players to have won the award with multiple clubs. Ronaldo and Suárez are the only players to win the award in two different leagues, with each having won the award while playing in both the Premier League and La Liga.

Players that are still active in Europe are highlighted in boldface.
Players that are still active outside of Europe are highlighted in italics.

Multiple European Golden Shoe winners
Player	Wins	Seasons
(Argentina) Lionel Messi	6	2009–10, 2011–12, 2012–13, 2016–17, 2017–18, 2018–19
(Portugal) Cristiano Ronaldo	4	2007–08, 2010–11, 2013–14 (Shared), 2014–15
(Portugal) Eusébio	2	1967–68, 1972–73
(West Germany) Gerd Müller	2	1969–70, 1971–72
(Romania) Dudu Georgescu	2	1974–75, 1976–77
(Portugal) Fernando Gomes	2	1982–83, 1984–85
(Brazil) Mário Jardel	2	1998–99, 2001–02
(France) Thierry Henry	2	2003–04, 2004–05 (Shared)
(Uruguay) Diego Forlán	2	2004–05 (Shared), 2008–09
(Uruguay) Luis Suárez	2	2013–14 (Shared), 2015–16
(Poland) Robert Lewandowski	2	2020–21, 2021–22
(England) **Harry Kane**	2	2023–24, 2025–26

=== Winners by club ===
European Golden Shoe winners by club
Club	Total	Players
(Spain) Barcelona	8	3
(Germany) Bayern Munich	6	3
(Spain) Real Madrid	5	3
(Romania) Dinamo București	3	2
(Portugal) Porto	3	2
(Bulgaria) CSKA Sofia	2	2
(England) Liverpool	2	2
(Netherlands) Ajax	2	2
(Portugal) Sporting CP	2	2
(England) Arsenal	2	1
(Portugal) Benfica	2	1
Austria Wien	1	1
(Austria) Rapid Wien	1	1
(Belgium) Lierse	1	1
(Bulgaria) Botev Plovdiv	1	1
(Cyprus) Omonia Nicosia	1	1
(England) Manchester City	1	1
(England) Manchester United	1	1
(England) Sunderland	1	1
(France) Marseille	1	1
(Italy) Fiorentina	1	1
(Italy) Lazio	1	1
(Italy) Roma	1	1
(Netherlands) AZ	1	1
(Netherlands) Vitesse	1	1
(Scotland) Celtic	1	1
(Spain) Atlético Madrid	1	1
(Spain) Deportivo La Coruña	1	1
(Spain) Villarreal	1	1
(Turkey) Galatasaray	1	1
(Serbia) Red Star Belgrade	1	1

=== Winners by nationality ===
European Golden Shoe winners by nationality
Nationality	Total	Players
Portugal	8	3
Argentina	7	2
Netherlands	4	4
Uruguay	4	2
Bulgaria	3	3
Italy	3	3
Brazil	3	2
England	3	2
France	3	2
Romania	3	2
Austria	2	2
Yugoslavia	2	2
Germany	2	1
Poland	2	1
Belgium	1	1
Cyprus	1	1
Greece	1	1
Mexico	1	1
Norway	1	1
Sweden	1	1
Turkey	1	1
Wales	1	1

=== Winners by league ===
European Golden Shoe winners by league
League	Total	Players
(Spain) La Liga	16	8
(England) Premier League	7	6
(Portugal) Primeira Liga	7	4
(Germany) Bundesliga	6	3
(Netherlands) Eredivisie	4	4
(Italy) Serie A	3	3
(Bulgaria) Parva Liga	3	3
(Romania) Liga I	3	2
(Austria) Austrian Bundesliga	2	2
(France) Ligue 1	1	1
(Cyprus) Cypriot First Division	1	1
(Belgium) Belgian Pro League	1	1
(Scotland) Scottish Premier Division	1	1
(Turkey) Süper Lig	1	1
(Socialist Federal Republic of Yugoslavia) Yugoslav First League	1	1

== 2025–26 season standings ==
As of 24 May 2026

2026 European Golden Shoe rankings
Rank	Player	Club(s)	League(s)	Goals	Minutes (Note: In the case of a tie on points, players are ranked by fewest minutes played.)	Factor (Note: The championships of the top five countries in the UEFA rankings have a factor of 2, whilst the countries ranked from 6th to 22nd place have a factor of 1.5. Other countries have a factor of 1.)	Points
1	(England) Harry Kane	Bayern Munich	(Germany) Bundesliga	36	2,382	2	72
2	(Norway) Erling Haaland	Manchester City	(England) Premier League	27	2,959	2	54
3	(France) Kylian Mbappé	Real Madrid	(Spain) La Liga	25	2,606	2	50
4	(Croatia) Dion Drena Beljo	Dinamo Zagreb	(Croatia) Croatian Football League	31	2,617	1.5	46.5
5	(Kosovo) Vedat Muriqi	Mallorca	(Spain) La Liga	23	3,137	2	46
6	(Brazil) Igor Thiago	Brentford	(England) Premier League	22	3,287	2	44
7	(Colombia) Luis Suárez	Sporting CP	(Portugal) Primeira Liga	28	2,699	1.5	42
8	(France) Esteban Lepaul	Angers/Rennes	(France) Ligue 1	21	2,705	2	42
9	(Germany) Deniz Undav	VfB Stuttgart	(Germany) Bundesliga	19	2,249	2	38
10	(Morocco) Ryan Mmaee	Omonia	(Cyprus) Cypriot First Division	25	2,276	1.5	37.5

== See also ==
- Gerd Müller Trophy
- European association football club records and statistics § Most goals in a season in all club competitions
