= 1988–89 Cypriot Third Division =

Cypriot Third Division
- Season: 1988–89
- Champions: Digenis Akritas Ipsona (2nd title)
- Promoted: Digenis Akritas Ipsona; AEZ Zakakiou
- Relegated: APEAN Ayia Napa; Iraklis Gerolakkou; Libanos Kormakiti

The 1988–89 Cypriot Third Division was the 18th season of the Cypriot third-level football league. Digenis Akritas Ipsona won their 2nd title.

== Format ==
Fourteen teams participated in the 1988–89 Cypriot Third Division. All teams played against each other twice, once at their home and once away. The team with the most points at the end of the season crowned champions. The first two teams were promoted to 1989–90 Cypriot Second Division. The last three teams were relegated to the 1989–90 Cypriot Fourth Division.

=== Point system ===
Teams received two points for a win, one point for a draw and zero points for a loss.

== League standings ==
Pos	Team	Pld	W	D	L	GF	GA	GD	Pts	Promotion or relegation
1	Digenis Akritas Ipsona	26	–	–	–	45	21	+24	35	Promoted to 1989–90 Cypriot Second Division
2	AEZ Zakakiou	26	–	–	–	34	23	+11	32	Promoted to 1989–90 Cypriot Second Division
3	AEK Katholiki	26	–	–	–	45	30	+15	31	
4	PAEEK FC	26	–	–	–	38	32	+6	28	
5	Othellos Athienou FC	26	–	–	–	28	28	0	25	
6	OXEN Peristeronas	26	–	–	–	29	31	−2	25	
7	Ethnikos Assia FC	26	–	–	–	21	23	−2	25	
8	Orfeas Athienou	26	–	–	–	33	36	−3	25	
9	Kentro Neotitas Maroniton	26	–	–	–	24	30	−6	25	
10	ASO Ormideia	26	–	–	–	26	35	−9	25	
11	Neos Aionas Trikomou	26	–	–	–	28	35	−7	25	
12	APEAN Ayia Napa	26	–	–	–	33	35	−2	24	Relegated to 1989–90 Cypriot Fourth Division
13	Iraklis Gerolakkou	26	–	–	–	31	39	−8	21	Relegated to 1989–90 Cypriot Fourth Division
14	Libanos Kormakiti	26	–	–	–	24	41	−17	20	Relegated to 1989–90 Cypriot Fourth Division

Rules for classification: 1) Points, 2) Goal differences, 3) Goal for

== Sources ==
- "Ύψωνας-ΑΕΖ ανεβαίνουν". Phileleftheros (in Greek). 1989-04-03. p. 6.

== See also ==
- Cypriot Third Division
- 1988–89 Cypriot First Division
- 1988–89 Cypriot Cup
