= 1991–92 Cypriot Fourth Division =

Cypriot Fourth Division
- Season: 1991–92
- Champions: OXEN Peristeronas; AEZ Zakakiou; Livadiakos Livadion
- Promoted: OXEN Peristeronas; AEZ Zakakiou; Livadiakos Livadion
- Relegated: AOL – Omonia Lakatamias; Atlas Aglandjias; Salamina Dromolaxias; Neos Aionas Trikomou; SEK Agiou Athanasiou; AEM Morphou

The 1991–92 Cypriot Fourth Division was the seventh season of the Cypriot fourth-level football league. The championship was split into three geographical groups, representing the Districts of Cyprus. The winners were:

- Nicosia-Keryneia Group: OXEN Peristeronas
- Larnaca-Famagusta Group: Livadiakos Livadion
- Limassol-Paphos Group: AEZ Zakakiou

The three winners were promoted to the 1992–93 Cypriot Third Division. Seven teams were relegated to regional leagues.

== See also ==
- Cypriot Fourth Division
- 1991–92 Cypriot First Division
- 1991–92 Cypriot Cup
