= Deftera =

Deftera may refer to:

- Kato Deftera, a village in Cyprus
- Pano Deftera, a village in Cyprus
