= Suad Beširević =

Slovenian footballer and manager (1963–2019)

Personal information
- Full name: Suad Beširević
- Date of birth: 4 March 1963
- Place of birth: Ljubljana, SR Slovenia, Yugoslavia
- Date of death: 27 September 2019 (aged 56)
- Place of death: Ljubljana, Slovenia
- Position: Centre-forward

Youth career
- 1977–1983: Svoboda

Senior career*
Years	Team	Apps	(Gls)
1983–1984	Svoboda		
1983–1984	Slovan	30	(8)
1984–1989	Borac Banja Luka	84	(58)
1989–1990	Rijeka	18	(3)
1990–1992	Apollon Limassol	51	(34)
1992–1993	Publikum Celje	11	(7)
1993–1994	APEP	20	(10)
1994–1995	Aris Limassol	28	(13)
1995–1996	Omonia Aradippou	11	(1)
Total		253	(134)

Managerial career
- 2002–2003: Ljubljana
- 2003–2004: Olimpija Ljubljana
- 2005–2006: Bela Krajina
- 2007–2011: Šenčur
- 2011–2012: Svoboda
- * Club domestic league appearances and goals

Suad Beširević (4 March 1963 – 28 September 2019) was a Slovene football manager and a professional football player.

== Playing career ==
=== Club ===
He was regarded as one of the best players of FK Borac Banja Luka, where he spent most of his career and where he won the 1987–88 Yugoslav Cup. He also won the 1990–91 Cypriot First Division and the 1991–92 Cypriot Cup with Apollon Limassol FC. He was the joint top goalscorer of the 1990–91 Cypriot First Division season alongside Panikos Xiourouppas, with 19 scored goals in 25 played games.

== Managerial career ==
As a manager Beširević won the Slovenian Cup in the 2002–03 season with NK Olimpija Ljubljana, whose manager he was from January 2003 to the summer of 2004. He also won the Slovenian Third League (West Group) with NK Šenčur in the 2008–09 season.

== Personal life ==
On 27 September 2019, Beširević died at the age of 56 after a long illness in his hometown of Ljubljana.

== Honours ==
=== Club ===
Borac Banja Luka

- Yugoslav Cup: 1987–88

Apollon Limassol

- Cypriot First Division: 1990–91
- Cypriot Cup: 1991–92

=== Individual ===
Performance

- Cypriot First Division Top Goalscorer: 1990–91 (19 goals)

=== Manager ===
Olimpija Ljubljana

- Slovenian Cup: 2002–03

Šenčur

- Slovenian Third League - West: 2008–09
