= 1972–73 Cypriot Third Division =

Cypriot Third Division
- Season: 1972–73
- Champions: Neos Aionas Trikomou (1st title)
- Promoted: Neos Aionas Trikomou

The 1972–73 Cypriot Third Division was the third season of the Cypriot third-level football league. Neos Aionas Trikomou won their 1st title.

== Format ==
Fourteen teams participated in the 1972–73 Cypriot Third Division. All teams played against each other twice, once at their home and once away. The team with the most points at the end of the season crowned champions. The first team was promoted to 1973–74 Cypriot Second Division.

=== Point system ===
Teams received two points for a win, one point for a draw and zero points for a loss.

== League standings ==
Pos	Team	Pld	W	D	L	GF	GA	GD	Pts	Promotion
1	Neos Aionas Trikomou	26	19	6	1	54	10	+44	44	Promoted to 1973–74 Cypriot Second Division
2	AEK Kythreas	26	15	7	4	39	17	+22	37	
3	Iraklis Gerolakkou	26	14	5	7	38	22	+16	33	
4	Faros Acropoleos	26	11	7	8	48	37	+11	29	
5	ENAZ Agia Zoni Limassol^{1}	26	9	11	6	52	57	−5	29	
6	Doxa Katokopias FC	26	10	7	9	38	33	+5	27	
7	Anagennisi Deryneia FC	26	9	9	8	37	33	+4	27	
8	AEK Karava FC	26	9	9	8	42	50	−8	27	
9	Ermis Aradippou FC	26	8	9	9	44	47	−3	25	
10	LALL Lysi	26	6	6	14	21	51	−30	18	
11	Anagennisi Larnacas	26	5	7	14	29	47	−18	17	
12	ASOB Vatili	26	5	7	14	22	44	−22	17	
13	Tsaggaris Peledriou (Note: ENAZ Agia Zoni Limassol and Sotirios Pelendriou were expelled from the CFA on the category of match-fixing. That's why Achilleas Kaimakli FC not relegated.)	26	6	4	16	37	45	−8	16	
14	Achilleas Kaimakli FC	26	5	6	15	32	44	−12	16	

Rules for classification: 1) Points, 2) Goal differences, 3) Goal for

== Sources ==
- "Το πρωτάθλημα Γ΄ κατηγορίας". Athlitiki (in Greek). 1973-05-07. p. 4.
- Cyprus Football Association (June 2015). "Το περιοδικό της ΚΟΠ" (PDF) (in Greek) (15). Λευκωσία: Cyprus Football Association: 68–73.

== See also ==
- Cypriot Third Division
- 1972–73 Cypriot First Division
- 1972–73 Cypriot Cup
