= 1991–92 Cypriot Second Division =

Cypriot Second Division
- Season: 1991–92
- Champions: Ethnikos Achna (2nd title)
- Promoted: Ethnikos Achna; APOP
- Relegated: Othellos; Apollon Ly.
- Matches played: 182
- Goals scored: 609 (3.35 per match)

The 1991–92 Cypriot Second Division was the 37th season of the Cypriot second-level football league. Ethnikos Achna won their 2nd title.

== Format ==
Fourteen teams participated in the 1991–92 Cypriot Second Division. All teams played against each other twice, once at their home and once away. The team with the most points at the end of the season crowned champions. The first two teams were promoted to 1992–93 Cypriot First Division. The last two teams were relegated to the 1992–93 Cypriot Third Division.

The 3rd-placed team faced the 12th-placed team of the 1991–92 Cypriot First Division, in a two-legged relegation play-off for one spot in the 1992–93 Cypriot First Division. The 12th-placed team faced the 3rd-placed team of the 1991–92 Cypriot Third Division, in a two-legged relegation play-off for one spot in the 1992–93 Cypriot Second Division.

== Changes from previous season ==
Teams promoted to 1991–92 Cypriot First Division

- Evagoras Paphos
- Omonia Aradippou

Teams relegated from 1990–91 Cypriot First Division

- APOP Paphos
- APEP

Teams promoted from 1990–91 Cypriot Third Division

- Othellos
- Ethnikos Assia
- Apollon Lympion

Teams relegated to 1991–92 Cypriot Third Division

- Ermis Aradippou
- Ethnikos Defteras
- Elpida Xylofagou

== League standings ==
Pos	Team	Pld	W	D	L	GF	GA	GD	Pts	Promotion or relegation
1	Ethnikos Achna (C, P)	26	16	7	3	64	17	+47	55	Promoted to Cypriot First Division
2	APOP Paphos (P)	26	15	7	4	57	22	+35	52	Promoted to Cypriot First Division
3	APEP	26	15	6	5	55	29	+26	51	Qualification for promotion play-off
4	APEP Pelendriou	26	14	8	4	45	26	+19	50	
5	Orfeas Nicosia	26	11	5	10	57	40	+17	38	
6	Akritas Chlorakas	26	11	3	12	36	35	+1	36	
7	Chalkanoras Idaliou	26	11	3	12	45	47	−2	36	
8	Doxa Katokopias	26	9	7	10	38	49	−11	34	
9	Onisilos Sotira	26	9	4	13	44	46	−2	31	
10	Anagennisi Deryneia	26	8	7	11	42	51	−9	31	
11	Digenis Morphou	26	7	9	10	35	39	−4	30	
12	Ethnikos Assia (O)	26	8	4	14	36	40	−4	28	Qualification for relegation play-off
13	Othellos Athienou (R)	26	8	4	14	29	51	−22	28	Relegated to Cypriot Third Division
14	Apollon Lympion (R)	26	1	4	21	26	117	−91	7	Relegated to Cypriot Third Division

Rules for classification: 1) Points, 2) Goal differences, 3) Goal for. Points system: Won=3 points, Drawn=1 point, Lost=0 points.
(C) Champions; (O) Play-off winners; (P) Promoted; (R) Relegated

== Playoff ==
=== Promotion playoff ===
The 3rd-placed team, APEP Pitsilia, faced the 12th-placed team of the 1991–92 Cypriot First Division, Olympiakos Nicosia, in a two-legged relegation play-off for one spot in the 1992–93 Cypriot First Division. Olympiakos Nicosia won both matches and secured their place in the 1992–93 Cypriot First Division.

- Olympiakos Nicosia 2–0 APEP Pitsilia
- APEP Pitsilia 0–3 Olympiakos Nicosia

=== Relegation playoff ===
The 12th-placed team, Ethnikos Assia, faced the 3rd-placed team of the 1991–92 Cypriot Third Division, Adonis Idaliou, in a two-legged relegation play-off for one spot in the 1992–93 Cypriot Second Division. Ethnikos Assia won the playoff and secured their place in the 1992–93 Cypriot Second Division.

== See also ==
- Cypriot Second Division
- 1991–92 Cypriot First Division
- 1991–92 Cypriot Cup

== Sources ==
- "1991/92 Cypriot Second Division". Rec.Sport.Soccer Statistics Foundation. 2016-01-14.
