= Parideio Drosias =

Cypriot football club

Parideio Drosias (Greek: Παρίδειο Δροσιάς) was a Cypriot association football club based in Larnaca. It participated in the 1988–1989 season of the Cypriot Fourth Division.
