= Olympias Frenarou =

- Founded: 1940

Olympias Frenarou (Greek: Ολυμπιάς Φρενάρου) is a volleyball team based in Frenaros, Famagusta District, Cyprus. Previously, Olympiaw had also a football team playing in Cypriot Fourth Division for 8 seasons. In 2000 the football team merged with Fotiakos Frenarou to form Frenaros FC 2000.

== Honours ==
=== Volleyball ===
Men

- Cyprus Volleyball Division 2:
  - Winner (2): 2007/08, 2010/11
- Cypriot Men's Volleyball Cup D2:
  - Winner (3): 2010/11, 2014/15, 2015/16
