= 1990–91 Cypriot Third Division =

Cypriot Third Division
- Season: 1990–91
- Champions: Othellos Athienou FC (1st title)
- Promoted: Othellos Athienou FC; Ethnikos Assia FC; Apollon Lympion
- Relegated: AEZ Zakakiou; OXEN Peristeronas; ASO Ormideia

The 1990–91 Cypriot Third Division was the 20th season of the Cypriot third-level football league. Othellos Athienou FC won their 1st title.

== Format ==
Fourteen teams participated in the 1990–91 Cypriot Third Division. All teams played against each other twice, once at their home and once away. The team with the most points at the end of the season crowned champions. The first two teams were promoted to 1991–92 Cypriot Second Division. The last three teams were relegated to the 1991–92 Cypriot Fourth Division.

The 3rd-placed team faced the 12th-placed team of the 1991–92 Cypriot Second Division, in a two-legged relegation play-off for one spot in the 1991–92 Cypriot Second Division.

=== Point system ===
Teams received two points for a win, one point for a draw and zero points for a loss.

== League standings ==
| Pos | Team | Pld | W | D | L | GF | GA | GD | Pts | Promotion or relegation |
|---|---|---|---|---|---|---|---|---|---|---|
| 1 | Othellos Athienou FC | 26 | – | – | – | 31 | 21 | +10 | 35 | Promoted to 1991–92 Cypriot Second Division |
| 2 | Ethnikos Assia FC | 26 | – | – | – | 29 | 20 | +9 | 33 | Promoted to 1991–92 Cypriot Second Division |
| 3 | Apollon Lympion | 26 | – | – | – | 34 | 28 | +6 | 29 | Promotion playoff |
| 4 | Keravnos Strovolou FC | 26 | – | – | – | 40 | 36 | +4 | 28 | |
| 5 | PAEEK FC | 26 | – | – | – | 32 | 30 | +2 | 27 | |
| 6 | AEK Katholiki | 26 | – | – | – | 32 | 28 | +4 | 25 | |
| 7 | Tsaggaris Peledriou | 26 | – | – | – | 37 | 37 | 0 | 25 | |
| 8 | Adonis Idaliou | 26 | – | – | – | 21 | 21 | 0 | 25 | |
| 9 | Digenis Akritas Ipsona | 26 | – | – | – | 32 | 21 | +11 | 25 | |
| 10 | ENTHOI Lakatamia FC | 26 | – | – | – | 34 | 41 | −7 | 25 | |
| 11 | Ayia Napa FC | 26 | – | – | – | 43 | 35 | +8 | 24 | |
| 12 | AEZ Zakakiou | 26 | – | – | – | 31 | 27 | +4 | 23 | Relegated to 1991–92 Cypriot Fourth Division |
| 13 | OXEN Peristeronas | 26 | – | – | – | 24 | 33 | −9 | 21 | Relegated to 1991–92 Cypriot Fourth Division |
| 14 | ASO Ormideia | 26 | – | – | – | 23 | 56 | −33 | 18 | Relegated to 1991–92 Cypriot Fourth Division |

Rules for classification: 1) Points, 2) Goal differences, 3) Goal for

== Promotion playoff ==
- Ermis Aradippou FC 0–1 Apollon Lympion
- Apollon Lympion 1–1 Ermis Aradippou FC

== Sources ==
- "Ο Οθέλλος πρωταθλητής". Phileleftheros (in Greek). 1991-04-29. p. 10.

== See also ==
- Cypriot Third Division
- 1990–91 Cypriot First Division
- 1990–91 Cypriot Cup
