= Panayiotis Xiourouppas =

Cypriot footballer and manager (born 1968)

Panikkos Xiourouppas
Personal information
- Full name: Panayiotis Xiourouppas
- Date of birth: September 4, 1968 (age 58)
- Place of birth: Aradippou, Cyprus
- Position: Striker

Youth career
- 1983–1986: Ermis Aradippou

Senior career*
Years	Team	Apps	(Gls)
1986–1998	Omonoia	202	(112)
1998–2001	AEK Larnaca	56	(29)
2001–2003	Anorthosis Famagusta	35	(8)
Total		293	(149)

International career
1995–2000	Cyprus	18	(2)

Managerial career
- 2006–2007: AEK Larnaca (assistant)
- 2007–2008: Enosis Neon Paralimni (assistant)
- 2008: Enosis Neon Paralimni
- 2009: Alki Larnaca
- 2011: Ermis Aradippou
- * Club domestic league appearances and goals

Panikkos Xiourouppas (Greek: Πανίκκος Ξιούρουππας) (born September 4, 1968) is a Cypriot retired professional football player and current football manager. He started his career in with Ermis Aradippou, while he played mainly for Omonoia and ended his career in Anorthosis Famagusta. He also played for AEK Larnaca.

== Honours ==
=== Club ===
Omonia

- Cypriot First Division: 1986–87, 1988–89, 1992–93
- Cypriot Cup: 1987–88, 1990–91, 1993–94
- Cypriot Super Cup: 1987, 1988, 1989, 1991, 1994

Anorthosis Famagusta

- Cypriot Cup: 2001–02, 2002–03

=== Individual ===
Performance

- Cypriot First Division Top Goalscorer: 1990–91 (19 goals)
