= 1991–92 Cypriot Third Division =

Cypriot Third Division
- Season: 1991–92
- Champions: PAEEK FC (1st title)
- Promoted: PAEEK FC; ENTHOI Lakatamia FC
- Relegated: Elpida Xylofagou; Kentro Neotitas Maroniton; Keravnos Strovolou FC

The 1991–92 Cypriot Third Division was the 21st season of the Cypriot third-level football league. PAEEK FC won their 1st title.

== Format ==
Fourteen teams participated in the 1991–92 Cypriot Third Division. All teams played against each other twice, once at their home and once away. The team with the most points at the end of the season crowned champions. The first two teams were promoted to 1992–93 Cypriot Second Division. The last three teams were relegated to the 1992–93 Cypriot Fourth Division.

The 3rd-placed team faced the 12th-placed team of the 1992–93 Cypriot Second Division, in a two-legged relegation play-off for one spot in the 1992–93 Cypriot Second Division.

=== Point system ===
Teams received three points for a win, one point for a draw and zero points for a loss.

== League standings ==
| Pos | Team | Pld | W | D | L | GF | GA | GD | Pts | Promotion or relegation |
|---|---|---|---|---|---|---|---|---|---|---|
| 1 | PAEEK FC | 26 | – | – | – | 69 | 22 | +47 | 59 | Promoted to 1992–93 Cypriot Second Division |
| 2 | ENTHOI Lakatamia FC | 26 | – | – | – | 54 | 24 | +30 | 57 | Promoted to 1992–93 Cypriot Second Division |
| 3 | Adonis Idaliou | 26 | – | – | – | 54 | 21 | +33 | 50 | Promotion playoff |
| 4 | Digenis Akritas Ipsona | 26 | – | – | – | 47 | 36 | +11 | 45 | |
| 5 | Ermis Aradippou FC | 26 | – | – | – | 58 | 19 | +39 | 44 | |
| 6 | AEK Kakopetrias | 26 | – | – | – | 45 | 29 | +16 | 44 | |
| 7 | AEK Katholiki | 26 | – | – | – | 63 | 36 | +27 | 42 | |
| 8 | Ayia Napa FC | 26 | – | – | – | 40 | 30 | +10 | 42 | |
| 9 | Tsaggaris Peledriou | 26 | – | – | – | 45 | 47 | −2 | 39 | |
| 10 | Ethnikos Defteras | 26 | – | – | – | 39 | 47 | −8 | 30 | |
| 11 | Achyronas Liopetriou | 26 | – | – | – | 42 | 56 | −14 | 26 | |
| 12 | Elpida Xylofagou | 26 | – | – | – | 29 | 68 | −39 | 20 | Relegated to 1992–93 Cypriot Fourth Division |
| 13 | Kentro Neotitas Maroniton | 26 | – | – | – | 23 | 102 | −79 | 12 | Relegated to 1992–93 Cypriot Fourth Division |
| 14 | Keravnos Strovolou FC | 26 | – | – | – | 16 | 87 | −71 | 6 | Relegated to 1992–93 Cypriot Fourth Division |

Rules for classification: 1) Points, 2) Goal differences, 3) Goal for

== Promotion playoff ==
Adonis Idaliou faced Ethnikos Assia FC. Ethnikos Assia FC won the playoffs.

== Sources ==
- "Η Κερύνεια πανηγυρίζει". Phileleftheros (in Greek). 1992-05-04. p. 14.

== See also ==
- Cypriot Third Division
- 1991–92 Cypriot First Division
- 1991–92 Cypriot Cup
