= 1989–90 Cypriot Fourth Division =

Cypriot Fourth Division
- Season: 1989–90
- Champions: Olimpiada Neapolis FC; APEAN Ayia Napa; Tsaggaris Peledriou
- Promoted: APEAN Ayia Napa; Tsaggaris Peledriou
- Relegated: Olympias Lympion; ENAD Ayiou Dometiou; Olympos Acheritou; Zenonas Larnaca; Digenis Agiou Nikolaou; Kourio Episkopi

The 1989–90 Cypriot Fourth Division was the fifth season of the Cypriot fourth-level football league. The championship was split into three geographical groups representing the Districts of Cyprus. The winners were:

- Nicosia-Keryneia Group: Olimpiada Neapolis FC
- Larnaca-Famagusta Group: APEAN Ayia Napa
- Limassol-Paphos Group: Tsaggaris Peledriou

The three winners were promoted to the 1990–91 Cypriot Third Division. Six teams were relegated to regional leagues.

== See also ==
- Cypriot Fourth Division
- 1989–90 Cypriot First Division
- 1989–90 Cypriot Cup
