= 1989–90 Cypriot Third Division =

Cypriot Third Division
- Season: 1989–90
- Champions: APEP Pelendriou (1st title)
- Promoted: APEP Pelendriou; Ermis Aradippou FC
- Relegated: Orfeas Athienou; Neos Aionas Trikomou; Kentro Neotitas Maroniton

The 1989–90 Cypriot Third Division was the 19th season of the Cypriot third-level football league. APEP Pelendriou won their 1st title.

== Format ==
Fourteen teams participated in the 1989–90 Cypriot Third Division. All teams played against each other twice, once at their home and once away. The team with the most points at the end of the season crowned champions. The first two teams were promoted to 1990–91 Cypriot Second Division. The last three teams were relegated to the 1990–91 Cypriot Fourth Division.

=== Point system ===
Teams received two points for a win, one point for a draw and zero points for a loss.

== League standings ==
Pos	Team	Pld	W	D	L	GF	GA	GD	Pts	Promotion or relegation
1	APEP Pelendriou	26	–	–	–	63	22	+41	43	Promoted to 1990–91 Cypriot Second Division
2	Ermis Aradippou FC	26	–	–	–	57	24	+33	39	Promoted to 1990–91 Cypriot Second Division
3	ENTHOI Lakatamia FC	26	–	–	–	53	28	+25	29	
4	AEK Katholiki	26	–	–	–	33	22	+11	27	
5	Othellos Athienou FC	26	–	–	–	35	32	+3	26	
6	Adonis Idaliou	26	–	–	–	47	46	+1	25	
7	Ethnikos Assia FC	26	–	–	–	34	32	+2	25	
8	Apollon Lympion	26	–	–	–	31	29	+2	24	
9	PAEEK FC	26	–	–	–	29	33	−4	24	
10	OXEN Peristeronas	26	–	–	–	31	33	−2	24	
11	ASO Ormideia	26	–	–	–	41	46	−5	19	
12	Orfeas Athienou	26	–	–	–	31	49	−18	19	Relegated to 1990–91 Cypriot Fourth Division
13	Neos Aionas Trikomou	26	–	–	–	14	47	−33	18	Relegated to 1990–91 Cypriot Fourth Division
14	Kentro Neotitas Maroniton	26	–	–	–	29	65	−36	9	Relegated to 1990–91 Cypriot Fourth Division

Rules for classification: 1) Points, 2) Goal differences, 3) Goal for

== Sources ==
- "Βαθμολογία Γ΄ κατηγορίας". Phileleftheros (in Greek). 1990-05-21. p. 11.

== See also ==
- Cypriot Third Division
- 1989–90 Cypriot First Division
- 1989–90 Cypriot Cup
