= ENAZ Agia Zoni Limassol =

ENAZ Agia Zoni Limassol was a Cypriot football club based in Agia Zoni, Limassol. The team played 3 times in Cypriot Third Division. At 1972–73 Cypriot Third Division they were expelled from the CFA on the category of match-fixing (with Sotirios Pelendriou).
