= 1990–91 Cypriot First Division =

Cypriot First Division
- Season: 1990–91
- Champions: Apollon (1st title)
- Relegated: APOP; APEP
- European Cup: Apollon (1st round)
- UEFA Cup: Anorthosis (1st round)
- Cup Winners' Cup: Omonia (1st round; via Cypriot Cup)
- Matches played: 182
- Goals scored: 501 (2.75 per match)
- Top goalscorer: Suad Beširević; Panayiotis Xiourouppas (19 goals)

The 1990–91 Cypriot First Division was the 52nd season of the Cypriot top-level football league. Apollon Limassol won their 1st title.

== Format ==
Fourteen teams participated in the 1990–91 Cypriot First Division. All teams played against each other twice, once at their home and once away. The team with the most points at the end of the season crowned champions. The last two teams were relegated to the 1991–92 Cypriot Second Division. The 12th-placed team faced the 3rd-placed team of the 1990–91 Cypriot Second Division, in a two-legged relegation play-off for one spot in the 1991–92 Cypriot First Division.

The champions ensured their participation in the 1991–92 European Cup and the runners-up in the 1991–92 UEFA Cup.

=== Point system ===
Teams received two points for a win, one point for a draw and zero points for a loss.

== Changes from previous season ==
Evagoras Paphos and Ethnikos Achna were relegated from previous season and played in the 1990–91 Cypriot Second Division. They were replaced by the first two teams of the 1989–90 Cypriot Second Division, EPA Larnaca and APEP.

== Stadia and locations ==
1990–91 Cypriot First Division

Club	Venue
AEL	Tsirion Stadium
Alki	GSZ Stadium
Anorthosis	Antonis Papadopoulos Stadium
APEP	Kyperounda Municipal Stadium
APOEL	Makario Stadium
Apollon	Tsirion Stadium
APOP	Pafiako Stadium
Aris	Tsirion Stadium
Enosis	Paralimni Municipal Stadium
EPA	GSZ Stadium
Nea Salamina	Antonis Papadopoulos Stadium
Olympiakos	Old GSP Stadium
Omonia	Makario Stadium
Pezoporikos	GSZ Stadium

== League standings ==
Pos	Team	Pld	W	D	L	GF	GA	GD	Pts	Qualification or relegation
1	Apollon Limassol (C)	26	19	6	1	60	20	+40	44	Qualification for European Cup first round
2	Anorthosis Famagusta	26	18	5	3	42	14	+28	41	Qualification for UEFA Cup first round
3	APOEL	26	13	9	4	48	23	+25	35	
4	Omonia	26	12	7	7	41	22	+19	31	Qualification for Cup Winners' Cup first round
5	AEL Limassol	26	10	8	8	36	36	0	28	
6	Nea Salamis Famagusta	26	9	9	8	38	31	+7	27	
7	Pezoporikos Larnaca	26	8	11	7	35	28	+7	27	
8	Aris Limassol	26	9	6	11	33	40	−7	24	
9	Alki Larnaca	26	8	8	10	32	40	−8	24	
10	EPA Larnaca	26	7	10	9	29	37	−8	24	
11	Olympiakos Nicosia	26	7	9	10	36	37	−1	23	
12	Enosis Neon Paralimni (O)	26	7	7	12	33	45	−12	21	Qualification for relegation playoff
13	APOP Paphos (R)	26	1	4	21	20	63	−43	6	Relegation to Cypriot Second Division
14	APEP (Note: APEP 4 points deducted) (R)	26	3	3	20	18	65	−47	5	Relegation to Cypriot Second Division

Rules for classification: 1) Points, 2) Goal differences, 3) Goals for.
(C) Champions; (O) Play-off winners; (R) Relegated

== Results ==
Home \ Away	AEL	ALK	ANR	APE	APN	APL	APP	ARS	ENP	EPA	NSL	OLY	OMO	POL
AEL		4–0	1–2	1–0	2–2	0–2	1–0	4–0	2–2	1–0	2–1	2–2	1–1	2–2
Alki	0–1		0–1	3–1	0–0	1–1	2–1	1–0	3–2	1–1	2–1	1–1	0–3	1–3
Anorthosis	1–1	1–0		2–0	2–0	3–0	5–0	2–0	3–1	4–0	0–0	0–0	0–0	1–0
APEP	1–1	3–5	1–2		0–3	1–1	2–1	0–3	0–2	0–0	2–3	0–4	1–2	1–0
APOEL	4–1	4–0	1–2	3–0		1–1	4–0	2–0	0–0	3–0	1–1	1–0	1–1	1–0
Apollon	1–0	0–0	3–1	3–0	2–2		2–0	5–1	3–0	5–2	5–2	2–0	1–1	3–1
APOP	0–1	3–3	0–2	0–1	2–4	1–2		0–4	2–3	1–1	0–1	0–0	2–4	1–0
Aris	4–3	1–1	1–0	1–0	4–1	0–5	2–0		1–1	1–1	1–1	4–1	0–2	1–1
ENP	1–1	2–1	0–1	6–1	1–4	0–2	2–1	2–1		0–1	1–1	2–1	0–2	1–1
EPA	0–1	2–1	0–2	5–2	1–1	0–2	4–1	1–0	3–2		0–0	1–1	1–0	0–0
Nea Salamis	5–1	1–3	0–1	4–0	1–0	1–3	1–1	3–0	4–0	1–1		1–1	2–1	1–2
Olympiakos	1–2	2–3	0–2	2–1	0–2	1–2	4–2	0–0	3–1	2–2	3–1		1–0	2–2
Omonia	1–0	0–0	4–1	3–0	1–2	0–2	6–0	0–2	2–0	3–2	0–1	2–0		1–1
Pezoporikos	3–0	1–0	1–1	5–0	1–1	1–2	2–1	3–1	1–1	2–0	0–0	1–4	1–1	

Legend: Blue = home team win; Yellow = draw; Red = away team win.

== Relegation play-off ==
The 12th-placed team Enosis Neon Paralimni faced the 3rd-placed team of the 1990–91 Cypriot Second Division Ethnikos Achna, in a two-legged play-off for one spot in the 1991–92 Cypriot First Division. Enosis Neon Paralimni won both matches and secured their place in the 1991–92 Cypriot First Division.

- Enosis Neon Paralimni 4–0 Ethnikos Achna
- Ethnikos Achna 1–3 Enosis Neon Paralimni

== See also ==
- Cypriot First Division
- 1990–91 Cypriot Cup
- List of top goalscorers in Cypriot First Division by season
- Cypriot football clubs in European competitions

== Sources ==
- "1990/91 Cypriot First Division". Rec.Sport.Soccer Statistics Foundation. 2016-01-14.
