= 1989–90 Cypriot First Division =

Cypriot First Division
- Season: 1989–90
- Champions: APOEL (14th title)
- Relegated: Evagoras; Ethnikos
- European Cup: APOEL (1st round)
- UEFA Cup: Omonia (1st round)
- Cup Winners' Cup: Nea Salamis (1st round; via Cypriot Cup)
- Matches played: 182
- Goals scored: 467 (2.57 per match)
- Top goalscorer: Siniša Gogić (19 goals)

The 1989–90 Cypriot First Division was the 51st season of the Cypriot top-level football league. APOEL won their 14th title.

== Format ==
Fourteen teams participated in the 1989–90 Cypriot First Division. All teams played against each other twice, once at their home and once away. The team with the most points at the end of the season crowned champions. The last two teams were relegated to the 1990–91 Cypriot Second Division.

The champions ensured their participation in the 1990–91 European Cup and the runners-up in the 1990–91 UEFA Cup.

=== Point system ===
Teams received two points for a win, one point for a draw and zero points for a loss.

== Changes from previous season ==
EPA Larnaca, Keravnos and Omonia Aradippou were relegated from previous season and played in the 1989–90 Cypriot Second Division. They were replaced by the first two teams of the 1988–89 Cypriot Second Division, Evagoras and Akli.

== Stadia and locations ==
1989–90 Cypriot First Division

Club	Venue
AEL	Tsirion Stadium
Alki	GSZ Stadium
Anorthosis	Antonis Papadopoulos Stadium
APOEL	Makario Stadium
Apollon	Tsirion Stadium
APOP	Pafiako Stadium
Aris	Tsirion Stadium
Ethnikos	Dasaki Stadium
Enosis	Paralimni Municipal Stadium
Evagoras	Pafiako Stadium
Nea Salamina	Antonis Papadopoulos Stadium
Olympiakos	GSP Stadium
Omonia	Makario Stadium
Pezoporikos	GSZ Stadium

== League standings ==
Pos	Team	Pld	W	D	L	GF	GA	GD	Pts	Qualification or relegation
1	APOEL (C)	26	18	5	3	46	19	+27	41	Qualification for European Cup first round
2	Omonia	26	15	6	5	53	21	+32	36	Qualification for UEFA Cup first round
3	Pezoporikos	26	10	11	5	37	27	+10	31	
4	Aris	26	11	8	7	43	31	+12	30	
5	Apollon	26	11	7	8	43	28	+15	29	
6	AEL	26	8	11	7	31	30	+1	27	
7	Anorthosis	26	10	7	9	20	28	−8	27	
8	Enosis Neon Paralimni	26	7	12	7	40	40	0	26	
9	Olympiakos	26	6	11	9	32	35	−3	23	
10	Nea Salamis	26	6	10	10	26	32	−6	22	Qualification for Cup Winners' Cup first round
11	APOP	26	6	10	10	30	46	−16	22	
12	Alki	26	6	9	11	27	36	−9	21	
13	Evagoras (R)	26	5	9	12	24	41	−17	19	Relegation to Cypriot Second Division
14	Ethnikos (R)	26	3	4	19	15	53	−38	10	Relegation to Cypriot Second Division

Rules for classification: 1) Points, 2) Goal differences, 3) Goal for. Points system: Won=2 points, Drawn=1 point, Lost=0 points
(C) Champions; (R) Relegated

== Results ==
Home \ Away	AEL	ALK	ANR	APN	APL	APP	ARS	ETH	ENP	EVA	NSL	OLY	OMO	POL
AEL		1–0	0–1	0–1	3–1	2–2	1–2	2–1	0–1	0–0	1–2	2–2	1–1	1–1
Alki	2–2		0–0	1–2	1–1	1–0	0–0	0–1	3–2	2–1	2–0	2–5	1–2	1–4
Anorthosis	0–0	1–0		0–2	1–0	0–0	0–0	1–0	1–2	1–0	1–0	1–0	1–2	2–0
APOEL	2–1	1–0	1–0		2–0	3–3	1–2	6–0	2–0	3–1	3–0	2–2	2–1	2–1
Apollon	0–0	2–1	0–0	2–0		2–0	0–2	3–1	3–1	2–1	1–2	4–0	2–3	4–0
APOP	1–2	0–0	2–1	2–3	1–1		1–4	2–0	2–2	2–2	1–0	1–0	2–1	1–3
Aris	0–0	2–3	4–1	0–2	1–1	5–1		2–1	2–2	1–1	0–0	3–0	0–1	2–1
Ethnikos	1–2	0–1	0–1	1–2	0–6	0–1	0–3		3–1	0–3	1–1	1–2	1–1	0–0
ENP	1–1	2–2	3–3	1–3	2–1	4–1	3–0	0–0		3–3	2–1	2–2	1–0	0–0
Evagoras	0–3	1–1	1–0	1–0	0–1	0–0	2–5	2–0	1–0		1–1	0–0	1–3	1–2
Nea Salamis	1–3	2–2	0–2	0–0	1–3	1–1	3–0	1–2	1–1	2–0		1–0	2–0	1–1
Olympiakos	0–2	1–0	5–0	0–0	2–2	1–1	2–2	4–0	2–2	0–0	1–0		0–0	0–2
Omonia	6–0	3–1	5–0	0–1	2–0	4–1	2–0	2–1	1–1	7–0	1–1	3–0		1–0
Pezoporikos	1–1	0–0	1–1	0–0	1–1	4–1	2–1	4–0	2–1	2–1	2–2	2–1	1–1	

Legend: Blue = home team win; Yellow = draw; Red = away team win.

== See also ==
- Cypriot First Division
- 1989–90 Cypriot Cup
- List of top goalscorers in Cypriot First Division by season
- Cypriot football clubs in European competitions

== Sources ==
- "1989/90 Cypriot First Division". Rec.Sport.Soccer Statistics Foundation. 2016-01-14.
