= 1972–73 Cypriot First Division =

Cypriot First Division
- Season: 1972–73

The 1972–73 Cypriot First Division was the 34th season of the Cypriot top-level football league.

== Overview ==
It was contested by 14 teams, and APOEL F.C. won the championship. AC Omonia participated in the Greek championship as the previous year's champions. They finished in 18th position.

== League standings ==
Pos	Team	Pld	W	D	L	GF	GA	GD	Pts	Qualification or relegation
1	APOEL F.C. (C)	26	17	8	1	35	11	+24	42	Qualification for European Cup first round
2	Olympiakos Nicosia	26	15	4	7	40	22	+18	34	Qualification for UEFA Cup first round
3	Pezoporikos Larnaca	26	9	13	4	28	17	+11	31	Qualification for Cup Winners' Cup first round
4	Anorthosis Famagusta FC	26	12	6	8	24	17	+7	30	
5	EN Paralimni	26	9	9	8	26	26	0	27	
6	EPA Larnaca FC	26	8	10	8	28	23	+5	26	
7	Digenis Akritas Morphou	26	10	6	10	26	30	−4	26	
8	AEL Limassol	26	8	8	10	30	29	+1	24	
9	Evagoras Paphos	26	6	11	9	20	29	−9	23	
10	Aris Limassol F.C.	26	5	12	9	25	34	−9	22	
11	Apollon Limassol	26	7	7	12	23	29	−6	21	
12	Alki Larnaca FC	26	5	10	11	18	26	−8	20	
13	Nea Salamis FC	26	8	4	14	18	28	−10	20	
14	ASIL Lysi (R)	26	5	8	13	17	37	−20	18	Relegation to Cypriot Second Division

(C) Champions; (R) Relegated

== Results ==
Home \ Away	AEL	ALK	ANR	APN	APL	ARS	ASL	DIG	ENP	EPA	EVG	NSL	OLY	POL
AEL		5–1	1–2	0–0	2–1	1–0	3–0	3–1	3–0	0–0	1–1	1–2	0–1	0–0
Alki	0–0		0–2	0–1	2–0	3–0	0–0	1–0	1–2	0–0	0–0	1–3	0–0	0–0
Anorthosis	2–0	0–1		1–1	1–0	2–0	1–0	3–0	0–0	0–0	1–0	1–0	1–0	2–0
APOEL	2–1	1–0	1–1		1–0	1–0	1–1	3–0	0–2	1–0	4–0	2–0	3–1	0–0
Apollon	1–1	2–1	3–1	1–1		0–0	1–0	2–0	3–2	1–2	3–0	2–0	1–2	0–0
Aris	2–1	1–1	1–1	2–4	0–0		1–0	2–0	1–1	0–0	1–1	3–1	1–1	1–1
ASIL	0–0	3–2	1–0	0–1	1–1	0–2		0–0	2–1	1–6	1–0	1–0	1–2	2–4
Digenis	1–0	2–1	2–0	0–0	1–1	2–1	1–1		1–0	0–2	3–0	1–0	2–0	2–2
ENP	1–2	0–0	0–0	0–1	1–0	3–0	2–1	2–1		1–0	1–1	1–0	1–1	0–0
EPA	2–2	1–0	0–1	1–1	1–0	2–2	2–0	1–0	2–3		2–3	2–2	0–2	0–0
Evagoras	3–0	1–1	2–1	0–1	2–0	1–1	1–1	1–1	1–1	1–0		1–0	0–2	0–0
Nea Salamis	0–1	0–1	1–0	0–1	1–0	1–1	0–0	1–2	1–0	1–1	1–0		0–3	2–0
Olympiakos	4–1	2–1	1–0	0–2	1–0	4–1	2–0	1–2	4–1	0–1	2–0	0–1		1–1
Pezoporikos	2–1	0–0	2–0	0–1	5–0	2–1	3–0	2–1	0–0	1–0	0–0	2–0	1–3	

Legend: Blue = home team win; Yellow = draw; Red = away team win.
