= Kato Deftera =

Kato Deftera: Κάτω Δευτερά (Greek); Aşağı Deftera (Turkish)
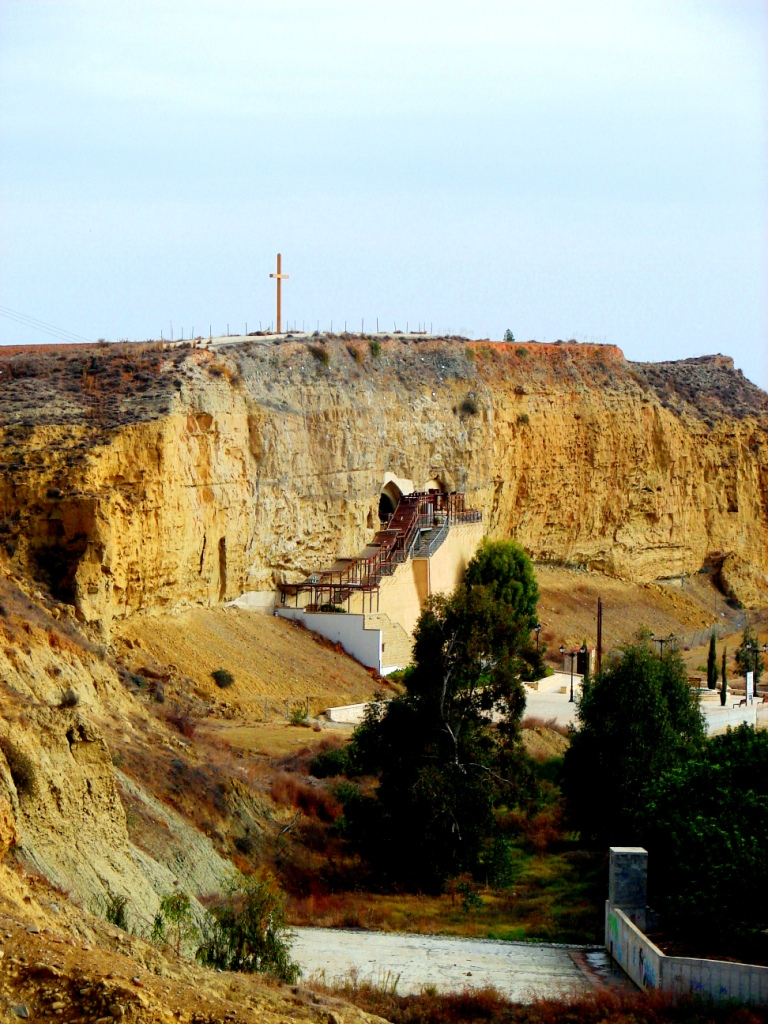
- Panagia Chrisospiliotissa

- Location within Cyprus
- Coordinates: 35°05′09″N 33°16′46″E
- Country: Cyprus
- District: Nicosia District

Population (2011)
  - Total: 2,054
- Website: www.deftera.org

Kato Deftera (Greek: Κάτω Δευτερά; Turkish: Aşağı Deftera) is a village 11 km south-west of Nicosia in Cyprus.
