= Livadiakos Livadion =

Cypriot football club

- Founded: 1971; 55 years ago
- Dissolved: 2010; 16 years ago

Livadiakos Livadion was a Cypriot football club based in Livadia, Larnaca. Founded in 1971, was playing sometimes in the Third and Fourth Division.

At 2010 the team merged with Salamina Livadion to form Livadiakos/Salamina Livadion.

The club had also a futsal team from 2003 to 2014.
