= 1991–92 Cypriot First Division =

Cypriot First Division
- Season: 1991–92
- Champions: APOEL (15th title)
- Relegated: Alki; Omonia Ar.
- Champions League: APOEL (1st round)
- UEFA Cup: Anorthosis (1st round)
- Cup Winners' Cup: Apollon (1st round; via Cypriot Cup)
- Matches played: 182
- Goals scored: 540 (2.97 per match)
- Top goalscorer: József Dzurják (21 goals)

The 1991–92 Cypriot First Division was the 53rd season of the Cypriot top-level football league. APOEL won their 15th title.

== Format ==
Fourteen teams participated in the 1991–92 Cypriot First Division. All teams played against each other twice, once at their home and once away. The team with the most points at the end of the season crowned champions. The last two teams were relegated to the 1992–93 Cypriot Second Division. The 12th-placed team faced the 3rd-placed team of the 1991–92 Cypriot Second Division, in a two-legged relegation play-off for one spot in the 1992–93 Cypriot First Division.

The champions ensured their participation in the 1992–93 UEFA Champions League and the runners-up in the 1992–93 UEFA Cup.

=== Point system ===
Teams received three points for a win, one point for a draw and zero points for a loss.

== Changes from previous season ==
APOP Paphos and APEP were relegated from previous season and played in the 1991–92 Cypriot Second Division. They were replaced by the first two teams of the 1990–91 Cypriot Second Division, Evagoras Paphos and Omonia Aradippou.

== Stadia and locations ==
1991–92 Cypriot First Division

Club	Venue
AEL	Tsirion Stadium
Alki	GSZ Stadium
Anorthosis	Antonis Papadopoulos Stadium
APOEL	Makario Stadium
Apollon	Tsirion Stadium
Aris	Tsirion Stadium
Enosis	Paralimni Municipal Stadium
EPA	GSZ Stadium
Evagoras	Pafiako Stadium
Nea Salamina	Ammochostos Stadium
Olympiakos	GSP Stadium
Omonia Ar.	Aradippou Municipal Stadium
Omonia	Makario Stadium
Pezoporikos	GSZ Stadium

== League standings ==
Pos	Team	Pld	W	D	L	GF	GA	GD	Pts	Qualification or relegation
1	APOEL (C)	26	18	6	2	68	26	+42	60	Qualification for Champions League first round
2	Anorthosis	26	18	4	4	55	23	+32	58	Qualification for UEFA Cup first round
3	Apollon	26	17	5	4	54	25	+29	56	Qualification for Cup Winners' Cup first round
4	Omonia	26	14	7	5	46	29	+17	49	
5	Nea Salamina	26	11	5	10	45	47	−2	38	
6	Pezoporikos	26	10	7	9	43	40	+3	37	
7	AEL	26	9	6	11	37	41	−4	33	
8	EPA	26	8	7	11	35	40	−5	31	
9	Enosis Neon Paralimni	26	7	9	10	36	37	−1	30	
10	Aris	26	7	8	11	29	44	−15	29	
11	Evagoras	26	7	6	13	24	37	−13	27	
12	Olympiakos (O)	26	7	5	14	28	53	−25	26	Qualification for relegation playoff
13	Alki (R)	26	4	6	16	23	45	−22	18	Relegation to Cypriot Second Division
14	Omonoia Aradippou (R)	26	1	7	18	17	53	−36	10	Relegation to Cypriot Second Division

Rules for classification: 1) Points, 2) Goal differences, 3) Goals for
(C) Champions; (O) Play-off winners; (R) Relegated

== Results ==
Home \ Away	AEL	ALK	ANR	APN	APL	ARS	ENP	EPA	EVG	NSL	OLY	OMA	OMN	POL
AEL		4–1	1–4	2–1	0–1	0–0	0–0	2–0	1–0	3–0	4–1	1–1	1–1	3–4
Alki	3–2		2–3	1–2	1–2	2–0	1–1	0–1	1–0	2–3	4–2	0–0	0–2	0–0
Anorthosis	3–0	3–1		2–2	0–0	4–2	1–0	2–1	1–0	2–1	4–0	3–1	0–2	1–2
APOEL	3–0	3–0	2–1		1–1	3–1	5–2	2–0	5–0	2–3	3–1	6–2	2–0	2–0
Apollon	1–1	2–0	1–0	2–3		1–0	2–2	5–1	2–1	2–2	4–0	2–0	5–2	3–1
Aris	3–2	1–1	1–7	1–2	0–3		2–2	0–3	0–0	3–1	2–1	2–1	0–0	1–1
ENP	6–2	1–0	2–2	0–1	1–2	0–2		3–3	1–0	3–0	1–3	0–0	1–0	0–1
EPA	0–1	4–0	0–0	2–2	0–2	0–1	1–1		0–1	3–2	2–2	2–1	1–3	3–1
Evagoras	2–1	1–0	0–2	0–4	1–2	0–0	2–1	0–0		2–2	3–0	5–0	1–1	1–3
Nea Salamina	1–0	1–1	1–3	0–3	2–1	2–1	2–1	2–1	4–1		3–2	4–0	2–3	4–1
Olympiakos	0–0	1–0	1–2	0–4	3–2	2–0	0–0	0–1	0–1	2–0		3–1	2–1	1–4
Omonia Ar.	2–3	1–1	0–1	1–1	1–4	0–3	1–3	1–2	2–0	0–0	0–0		0–2	1–3
Omonia	2–1	4–1	0–3	3–3	1–0	3–0	3–1	2–2	3–1	3–1	1–1	1–0		3–0
Pezoporikos	1–2	1–0	0–1	1–1	1–2	3–3	1–3	4–2	1–1	2–2	6–0	1–0	0–0	

Legend: Blue = home team win; Yellow = draw; Red = away team win.

== Relegation play-off ==
The 12th-placed team Olympiakos faced the 3rd-placed team of the 1991–92 Cypriot Second Division APEP, in a two-legged play-off for one spot in the 1992–93 Cypriot First Division. Olympiakos won both matches and secured their place in the 1992–93 Cypriot First Division.

- Olympiakos 2–0 APEP
- APEP 0–3 Olympiakos

== See also ==
- Cypriot First Division
- 1991–92 Cypriot Cup
- List of top goalscorers in Cypriot First Division by season
- Cypriot football clubs in European competitions

== Sources ==
- "1991/92 Cypriot First Division". Rec.Sport.Soccer Statistics Foundation. 2016-01-14.
