= Olympias Frenarou FC =

- Founded: 1942
- Dissolved: 2000

Olympias Frenarou FC was a Cypriot football club based in Frenaros, Famagusta. Founded in 1942, it played in the fourth division. In 2000 the football team merged with Fotiakos Frenarou to form Frenaros FC 2000. The team was part of the sports club Olympias Frenarou.
