= Triptolemus Evrychou =

Cypriot football club

- Founded: 1939; 86 years ago

Triptolemus Evrychou is a Cypriot association football club based in Evrychou, located in the Nicosia District. Its colours are black and white. It has 8 participations in Cypriot Fourth Division.
