= 1988–89 Cypriot First Division =

Cypriot First Division
- Season: 1988–89
- Champions: Omonia (16th title)
- Relegated: EPA; Keravnos; Omonia Ar.
- European Cup: Omonia (1st round)
- UEFA Cup: Apollon (1st round)
- Cup Winners' Cup: AEL (1st round; via Cypriot Cup)
- Matches played: 210
- Goals scored: 598 (2.85 per match)
- Top goalscorer: Nigel McNeal (19 goals)

The 1988–89 Cypriot First Division was the 50th season of the Cypriot top-level football league. Omonia won their 16th title.

== Format ==
Fifteen teams participated in the 1988–89 Cypriot First Division. All teams played against each other twice, once at their home and once away. The team with the most points at the end of the season crowned champions. The last three teams were relegated to the 1989–90 Cypriot Second Division.

The champions ensured their participation in the 1989–90 European Cup and the runners-up in the 1989–90 UEFA Cup.

=== Point system ===
Teams received two points for a win, one point for a draw and zero points for a loss.

== Changes from previous season ==
APEP, Alki and Anagennisi were relegated from previous season and played in the 1988–89 Cypriot Second Division. They were replaced by the first two teams of the 1987–88 Cypriot Second Division, Keravnos and Omonia Aradippou.

== Stadia and locations ==
1988–89 Cypriot First Division

Club	Venue
AEL	Tsirion Stadium
Anorthosis	Antonis Papadopoulos Stadium
APOEL	Makario Stadium
Apollon	Tsirion Stadium
APOP	Pafiako Stadium
Aris	Tsirion Stadium
Ethnikos	Dasaki Stadium
Enosis	Paralimni Municipal Stadium
EPA	GSZ Stadium
Keravnos	Keravnos Strovolou Stadium
Nea Salamis	Antonis Papadopoulos Stadium
Olympiakos	GSP Stadium
Omonia Ar.	Aradippou Municipal Stadium
Omonia	Makario Stadium
Pezoporikos	GSZ Stadium

== League standings ==
Pos	Team	Pld	W	D	L	GF	GA	GD	Pts	Qualification or relegation
1	Omonia (C)	28	17	9	2	60	22	+38	43	Qualification for European Cup first round
2	Apollon	28	15	10	3	61	26	+35	40	Qualification for UEFA Cup first round
3	APOEL	28	15	4	9	48	38	+10	34	
4	Nea Salamis	28	11	11	6	51	35	+16	33	
5	AEL	28	10	10	8	50	40	+10	30	Qualification for Cup Winners' Cup first round
6	Anorthosis	28	10	10	8	31	31	0	30	
7	Pezoporikos	28	7	14	7	35	34	+1	28	
8	APOP	28	9	10	9	36	40	−4	28	
9	Olympiakos	28	7	13	8	43	42	+1	27	
10	Ethnikos	28	10	7	11	34	43	−9	27	
11	Enosis Neon Paralimni	28	7	13	8	35	47	−12	27	
12	Aris	28	8	10	10	42	39	+3	26	
13	EPA (R)	28	6	9	13	32	41	−9	21	Relegation to Cypriot Second Division
14	Keravnos (R)	28	6	9	13	27	39	−12	21	Relegation to Cypriot Second Division
15	Omonia Ar. (R)	28	1	3	24	13	81	−68	5	Relegation to Cypriot Second Division

Rules for classification: 1) Points, 2) Goal differences, 3) Goal for. Points system: Won=2 points, Drawn=1 point, Lost=0 points
(C) Champions; (R) Relegated

== Results ==
Home \ Away	AEL	ANR	APN	APL	APP	ARS	ETH	ENP	EPA	KRN	NSL	OLI	OMA	OMN	POL
AEL		0–1	1–0	2–0	1–3	2–2	4–2	5–1	3–1	4–2	1–1	0–2	8–0	1–3	1–1
Anorthosis	2–0		2–3	0–0	0–0	0–0	4–1	1–0	2–1	1–0	1–0	1–1	4–1	1–1	1–1
APOEL	2–0	3–0		0–0	0–1	3–2	4–2	1–1	0–0	3–0	1–1	4–3	4–0	0–5	3–1
Apollon	1–2	1–0	4–2		4–2	0–0	4–0	4–1	2–1	2–2	2–2	2–1	9–1	2–2	2–1
APOP	1–1	3–2	0–2	0–0		3–3	1–1	4–1	2–1	2–1	1–1	1–1	1–1	0–0	2–0
Aris	1–1	4–0	1–0	0–1	1–2		1–2	3–3	5–2	2–0	1–0	2–1	2–0	1–3	1–4
Ethnikos	0–2	0–0	4–2	1–3	1–0	1–1		1–0	0–0	1–0	1–3	3–1	0–2	0–1	1–1
ENP	0–0	1–0	2–1	1–0	3–1	0–0	2–2		2–2	0–0	2–2	2–1	0–0	1–1	2–2
EPA	3–3	1–2	1–2	0–2	2–0	3–1	0–1	0–1		0–0	1–2	0–0	1–0	1–5	2–2
Keravnos	0–0	1–1	0–2	0–1	2–1	1–1	1–3	7–2	1–1		3–2	2–2	1–0	0–2	0–0
Nea Salamis	4–2	2–0	4–0	1–3	4–1	1–0	1–0	1–1	1–1	2–0		1–2	5–0	1–1	2–2
Olympiakos	2–2	3–1	0–1	1–1	4–2	3–2	2–2	2–2	0–3	2–0	4–4		0–0	0–1	1–1
Omonia Ar.	0–1	0–1	2–4	1–9	1–2	0–3	0–2	1–2	1–2	0–2	0–1	0–2		1–7	0–1
Omonia	3–1	2–2	0–1	1–1	0–0	2–1	2–0	3–2	1–0	2–0	4–2	0–0	5–0		2–3
Pezoporikos	2–2	1–1	1–0	1–1	2–0	1–1	1–2	2–0	0–2	0–1	0–0	2–2	2–1	0–1	

Legend: Blue = home team win; Yellow = draw; Red = away team win.

== See also ==
- Cypriot First Division
- 1988–89 Cypriot Cup
- List of top goalscorers in Cypriot First Division by season
- Cypriot football clubs in European competitions

== Sources ==
- "1988/89 Cypriot First Division". Rec.Sport.Soccer Statistics Foundation. 2016-01-14.
