= Doxa Polemidion =

Cypriot football club

- Founded: 1958; 67 years ago

Doxa Polemidion is a Cypriot association football club based in Kato Polemidia, located in the Limassol District. Its colours are yellow and black. It has five participations in Cypriot Fourth Division.
