= Kimonas Xylotympou =

- Founded: 1925
- Dissolved: 2006
- Ground: Xylotymvou Municipality Stadium

Kimonas Xylotympou was a Cypriot association football club based in Xylotympou, located in the Larnaca District. Its stadium is the Xylotymvou Municipality Stadium. It had 7 participations in Cypriot Fourth Division. At 2006 merged with Omonoia Xylotympou to form Podosfairikos Omilos Xylotymbou 2006.
