= Doxa Devtera =

Cypriot football club

- Founded: 1968; 57 years ago

Doxa Devtera is a Cypriot association football club based in Deftera, located in the Nicosia District. It has 5 participations in Cypriot Fourth Division.
