= Panikos & Sokratis Zakakiou =

Cypriot football club

- Founded: 1959; 66 years ago
- Ground: Zakaki Community Stadium

Panikos & Sokratis Zakakiou is a Cypriot association football club based in Zakaki, located in the Limassol District. Its stadium is the Zakaki Municipal Stadium. It has 3 participations in Cypriot Fourth Division.
