= Neos Aionas Trikomou =

- Founded: 1900; 126 years ago
- Dissolved: 1992; 34 years ago

Neos Aionas Trikomou (Greek: Νέος Αιώνας Τρικώμου, "New Century Trikomou") was a Cypriot football club based in Trikomo. Founded in 1900, it was played sometimes in Second and sometimes in the Third and Fourth Divisions.

After the Turkish invasion of Cyprus and occupation of the city of Trikomo in 1974, the team was displaced to the southern part of the island, in Limassol. The football team dissolved in 1992 due to financial problems.

== Honours ==
- Cypriot Third Division:
  - Champions (1): 1973
