= Ethnikos Defteras =

Association football team from Deftera, Cyprus

- Founded: 1948

Ethnikos Defteras is a Cypriot football club based in Deftera. Founded in 1948, was playing sometimes in Second and sometimes in the Third and Fourth Division.
