= Digenis Akritas Ipsona =

- Founded: 1958
- Dissolved: 14 May 2014
- Ground: Stelios Chari Stadium

Digenis Akritas Ipsona was a Cypriot football club based in Ipsonas, Limassol. Founded in 1956, it was playing sometimes in Second, in Third and Fourth division. In 2014 it has merged with Enosi Neon Ypsona to form Enosi Neon Ypsona-Digenis Ipsona.

== Honours ==
- Cypriot Third Division:
  - Champions (2): 1982, 1989
