= Takis Mavris =

Cypriot footballer (born 1956)

Personal information
- Full name: Christakis Omirou Mavris
- Date of birth: 5 June 1956 (age 70)
- Place of birth: Pallouriotissa, Cyprus
- Position: Midfielder

Youth career
- Anagennisi Pallouriotissa

Senior career*
Years	Team	Apps	(Gls)
1974–1988	Omonia	417	(86)

International career
1976–1984	Cyprus	17	(1)
- * Club domestic league appearances and goals

Christakis Omirou Mavris (Greek: Χριστάκης Ομήρου Μαυρής; born 5 June 1956), sometimes referred to as Christos Omirou, Christos Mavris or simply Takis Mavris (Greek: Τάκης Μαυρής), is a Cypriot former footballer who played as a midfielder and made 17 appearances for the Cyprus national team.

== Career ==
Mavris made his debut for Cyprus on 27 October 1976 in a 1978 FIFA World Cup qualification match against Denmark, which finished as a 0–5 loss. He went on to make 17 appearances, scoring 1 goal, before making his last appearance on 23 December 1984 in a 1986 FIFA World Cup qualification match against the Netherlands, which finished as a 0–1 loss.

== Career statistics ==
=== International ===
Cyprus
Year	Apps	Goals
1976	3	0
1977	2	0
1980	2	0
1982	2	0
1983	4	1
1984	4	0
Total	17	1

=== International goals ===
No.	Date	Venue	Opponent	Score	Result	Competition
1	12 February 1983	Tsirio Stadium, Limassol, Cyprus	Italy	1–0	1–1	UEFA Euro 1984 qualifying

== Honours ==
Omonia

- Cypriot First Division: 1974–75, 1975–76, 1976–77, 1977–78, 1978–79, 1980–81, 1981–82, 1982–83, 1983–84, 1984–85, 1986–87,
- Cypriot Cup: 1979–80, 1980–81, 1981–82, 1982–83
- Cypriot Super Cup: 1979, 1980, 1981, 1982, 1983, 1987
