= Andreas Kantilos =

Cypriot footballer (born 1964)

Personal information
- Full name: Andros Andreou Kantilos
- Date of birth: 20 April 1964 (age 62)
- Place of birth: Pallouriotissa, Cyprus
- Position: Right winger

Youth career
- Anagennisi Pallouriotissa

Senior career*
Years	Team	Apps	(Gls)
1980–1997	Omonia	489	(152)

International career
1986–1990	Cyprus	6	(0)
- * Club domestic league appearances and goals

Andreas Andreou Kantilos (Greek: Ἀνδρέας Ἀνδρέου Καντηλος; born 20 April 1964) is a Cypriot former professional footballer who played as a right winger.

== Honours ==
Omonia

- Cypriot First Division: 1980–81, 1981–82, 1982–83, 1983–84, 1984–85, 1986–87, 1988–89, 1992–93
- Cypriot Cup: 1980–81, 1981–82, 1982–83, 1987–88, 1990–91, 1993–94
- Cypriot Super Cup: 1980, 1981, 1982, 1983, 1987, 1988, 1989, 1991, 1994
