= 1982–83 Cypriot Second Division =

Cypriot Second Division
- Season: 1982–83
- Champions: Ermis Aradippou FC (1st title)
- Promoted: Ermis Aradippou FC; Ethnikos Achna FC
- Relegated: Adonis Idaliou; Othellos Athienou FC

The 1982–83 Cypriot Second Division was the 28th season of the Cypriot second-level football league. Ermis Aradippou FC won their 1st title.

== Format ==
Fourteen teams participated in the 1982–83 Cypriot Second Division. All teams played against each other twice, once at their home and once away. The team with the most points at the end of the season crowned champions. The first two teams were promoted to 1983–84 Cypriot First Division. The last two teams were relegated to the 1983–84 Cypriot Third Division.

== Changes from previous season ==
Teams promoted to 1982–83 Cypriot First Division

- Alki Larnaca FC
- Aris Limassol FC

Teams relegated from 1981–82 Cypriot First Division

- Keravnos Strovolou FC
- Evagoras Paphos

Teams promoted from 1981–82 Cypriot Third Division

- Digenis Akritas Ipsona
- Anagennisi Deryneia FC

Teams relegated to 1982–83 Cypriot Third Division

- Akritas Chlorakas
- Digenis Akritas Morphou FC

== League standings ==
Pos	Team	Pld	Pts	Promotion or relegation
1	Ermis Aradippou FC (C, P)	26	41	Promoted to Cypriot First Division
2	Ethnikos Achna FC (P)	26	37	Promoted to Cypriot First Division
3	Evagoras Paphos	26	29	
4	Anagennisi Deryneia FC	26	27	
5	Keravnos Strovolou FC	26	27	
6	Orfeas Nicosia	26	25	
7	PAEEK FC	26	24	
8	Apollon Lympion	26	24	
9	AEM Morphou	26	23	
10	Chalkanoras Idaliou	26	23	
11	Kentro Neotitas Maroniton	26	23	
12	Digenis Akritas Ipsona	26	23	
13	Adonis Idaliou (R)	26	22	Relegated to Cypriot Third Division
14	Othellos Athienou FC (R)	26	16	Relegated to Cypriot Third Division

Rules for classification: 1) Points, 2) Goal differences, 3) Goal for. Points system: Won=2 points, Drawn=1 point, Lost=0 points.
(C) Champions; (P) Promoted; (R) Relegated

== See also ==
- Cypriot Second Division
- 1982–83 Cypriot First Division
- 1982–83 Cypriot Cup
