= 1981–82 Cypriot Second Division =

Cypriot Second Division
- Season: 1981–82
- Champions: Alki Larnaca FC (2nd title)
- Promoted: Alki Larnaca FC; Aris Limassol FC
- Relegated: Akritas Chlorakas; Digenis Akritas Morphou FC

The 1981–82 Cypriot Second Division was the 27th season of the Cypriot second-level football league. Alki Larnaca FC won their 2nd title.

== Format ==
Fourteen teams participated in the 1981–82 Cypriot Second Division. All teams played against each other twice, once at their home and once away. The team with the most points at the end of the season crowned champions. The first two teams were promoted to 1982–83 Cypriot First Division. The last two teams were relegated to the 1982–83 Cypriot Third Division.

== Changes from previous season ==
Teams promoted to 1981–82 Cypriot First Division

- Evagoras Paphos
- APOP Paphos FC

Teams relegated from 1980–81 Cypriot First Division

- Alki Larnaca FC
- Aris Limassol FC

Teams promoted from 1980–81 Cypriot Third Division

- Kentro Neotitas Maroniton
- Apollon Lympion

Teams relegated to 1981–82 Cypriot Third Division

- Iraklis Gerolakkou
- Neos Aionas Trikomou

== League standings ==
Pos	Team	Pld	W	D	L	GF	GA	GD	Pts	Promotion or relegation
1	Alki Larnaca FC (C, P)	26	–	–	–	72	15	+57	50	Promoted to Cypriot First Division
2	Aris Limassol FC (P)	26	–	–	–	88	22	+66	45	Promoted to Cypriot First Division
3	Ethnikos Achna FC	26	–	–	–	48	31	+17	35	
4	Kentro Neotitas Maroniton	26	–	–	–	44	37	+7	31	
5	Orfeas Nicosia	26	–	–	–	26	31	−5	24	
6	Apollon Lympion	26	–	–	–	28	34	−6	24	
7	Othellos Athienou FC	26	–	–	–	24	31	−7	24	
8	Ermis Aradippou FC	26	–	–	–	34	47	−13	23	
9	Chalkanoras Idaliou	26	–	–	–	29	38	−9	21	
10	AEM Morphou	26	–	–	–	16	38	−22	20	
11	PAEEK FC	26	–	–	–	21	32	−11	19	
12	Adonis Idaliou	26	–	–	–	23	45	−22	19	
13	Akritas Chlorakas (R)	26	–	–	–	27	51	−24	19	Relegated to Cypriot Third Division
14	Digenis Akritas Morphou FC (R)	26	–	–	–	22	52	−30	10	Relegated to Cypriot Third Division

Rules for classification: 1) Points, 2) Goal differences, 3) Goal for. Points system: Won=2 points, Drawn=1 point, Lost=0 points.
(C) Champions; (P) Promoted; (R) Relegated

== See also ==
- Cypriot Second Division
- 1981–82 Cypriot First Division
- 1981–82 Cypriot Cup
