= Sotiris Kaiafas =

Cypriot footballer (born 1949)

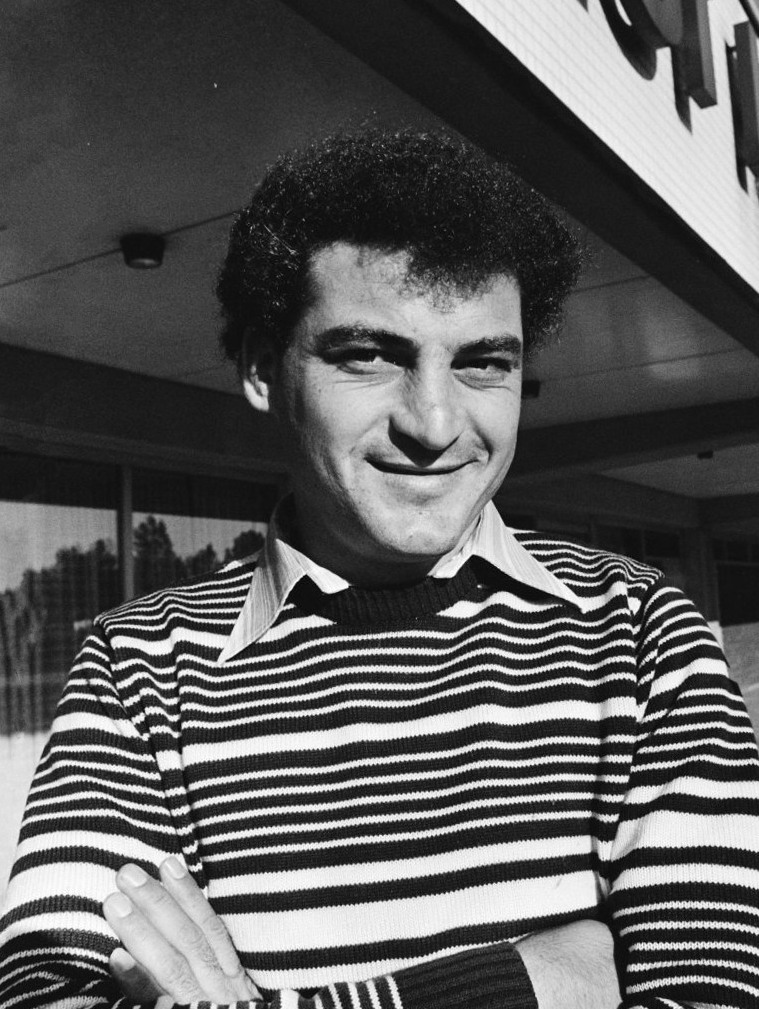
- Kaiafas in October 1979

Personal information
- Full name: Sotirios Kaiafas
- Date of birth: 17 December 1949 (age 76)
- Place of birth: Mia Milia, Cyprus
- Height: 1.76 m (5 ft 9 1/2 in)
- Position: Striker

Youth career
- 196?–1965: Prodoos
- 1965–1967: Omonia

Senior career*
| Years | Team | Apps | (Gls) |
| 196?–1965 | Prodoos | | |
| 1967–1984 | Omonia | 388 | (261) |

International career
| 1972–1980 | Cyprus | 17 | (2) |
- * Club domestic league appearances and goals

Sotirios Kaiafas (Greek: Σωτήριος Καϊάφας; born 17 December 1949) is a Cypriot former footballer who is considered to be Cyprus's best footballer. He played for Omonia and the Cyprus national team. During his career at Omonia, he won the European Golden Boot (1975–76).

== Club career ==
Kaiafas played for a local club in Mia Milia, called Prodoos. He joined Omonia in 1965, and in 1967 he debuted for Omonia's senior team, joining the youth team at the age of 16. Soon he established himself as one of the most prolific strikers Omonia had ever employed, but it was not until the early 1970s that he served notice of his talent. In the 1971–72 season, Kaiafas became for first time leading scorer in Cyprus with 12 goals, a tally that helped Omonia to their third domestic title. It was the start of a successful partnership. Kaiafas, like other Cypriot stars such as Andreas Stylianou, Panicos Efthymiades, and Leonidas Leonidou, became a cult hero to the fans during a period where there was a close connection between players and fans; during this time, football was played on gravel and footballers were paid only a pittance by clubs.

During the Turkish invasion of Cyprus, the Turks captured the northern part of Cyprus, including Kaiafas' home village Mia Milia. He, along with 200,000 other Greek Cypriots, had to leave his house and become a refugee in the rest of Cyprus. He moved to South Africa with his family, but came back to Cyprus one year later and has lived with his family in Nicosia since then. He continued playing football while in South Africa. Kaiafas was the top scorer of the Cypriot First Division in another seven seasons (1973–74, 1975–76, 1976–77, 1978–79, 1979–80, 1980–81, and 1981–82) and scored a total of nearly 300 league goals, having the record of scoring 44 goals in one season. He helped his beloved Omonia AC to the league championship on six occasions.

His most productive season was 1975–76, when his 41 league goals were sufficient to win him the European Golden Boot and to date represents the highest award ever won by a Cypriot footballer. He was also voted "Cypriot Sportsman of the Year" in 1976 and 1978 by the Cyprus Journalists Association. "Winning the Golden Boot was one of the happiest days of my life," he said. "It is a very special honour for any European footballer."

On 7 November 1979, Kaiafas enjoyed one of his best games for Omonia, scoring twice as they defeated Dutch team Ajax 4–0 in the second round of the European Cup (a partial explanation for the shock scoreline is that it was the second leg of the tie and Omonia had lost 10–0 in Amsterdam two weeks earlier). In the previous round, Kaiafas had scored four goals as Omonia defeated Luxembourg's Red Boys 6–1. This left him as the third highest goalscorer in the European Cup that season. His success at club level was not reflected whilst playing for his country but that might reflect the defensive strategy Cyprus employed at the time. For a Cypriot player, international goals were always harder to come by in the days of Pelé, Johan Cruyff, and Franz Beckenbauer. Yet, even while appearing for one of Europe's smaller teams, Kaiafas managed to register twice in 17 matches.

Kaiafas announced his retirement from football in May 1984, ending a career which coincided with the greatest decade in Omonia's history, seeing them as league champions seven times. He refers to the club as his "second family". In 2003, he was selected as the Golden Player of Cyprus and had the honour of representing his country at the UEFA Jubilee Awards.

His son, Kostas, spent the majority of his own footballing career at Omonia, becoming the team's second most capped played of all time, and winning several trophies. After retiring as a player, Kostas managed Omonia, between 2014 and 2015. Kaiafas' grandsons, Alexandros and Sotiris are in the early stages of their careers at Omonia and Olympiakos Nicosia respectively.

== Honours ==
Omonia

- Cypriot First Division (11): 1971–72, 1973–74, 1974–75, 1975–76, 1976–77, 1977–78, 1978–79, 1980–81, 1981–82, 1982–83, 1983–84
- Cypriot Cup (6): 1971–72, 1973–74, 1979–80, 1980–81, 1981–82, 1982–83
- Cypriot Super Cup: 1979, 1980, 1981, 1982, 1983

Individual

- European Golden Shoe: 1975–76
- World Top Scorer: 1975–76
- Cypriot First Division Top Scorer (8): 1971–72, 1973–74, 1975–76, 1976–77, 1978–79, 1979–80, 1980–81, 1981–82
- Cypriot Sportsman of the Year: 1976, 1978
- UEFA Jubilee Awards Best Cypriot Footballer of the 20th Century
- Cyprus Sports Association Best Cypriot Sportsman of the 20th Century (shared with athlete Stavros Tziortzis)
