= 1985–86 European Cup =

European football tournament

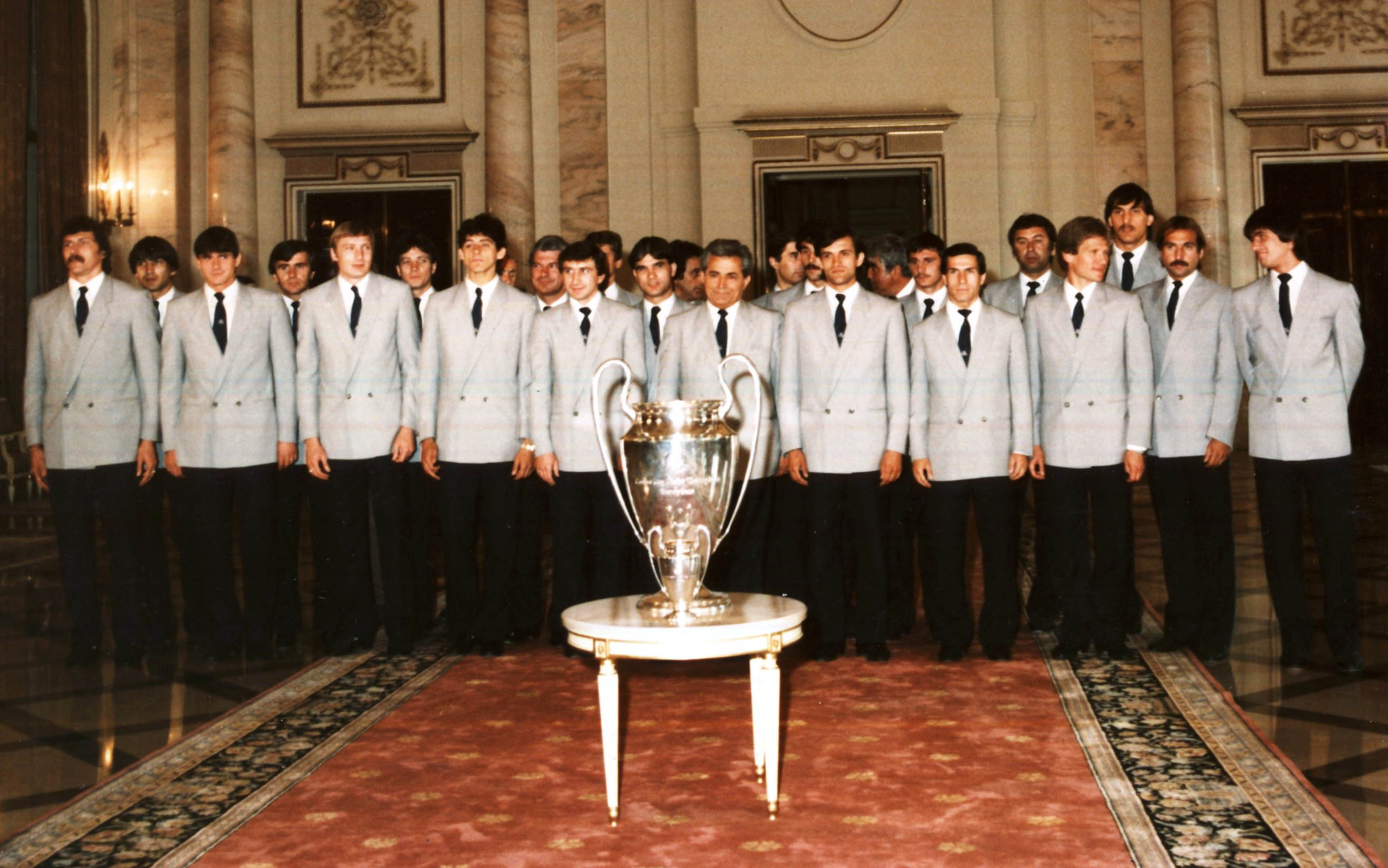
- Steaua team with the European Cup.

Tournament details
- Dates: 18 September 1985 – 7 May 1986
- Teams: 31

Final positions
- Champions: (Romania) Steaua București (1st title)
- Runners-up: (Spain) Barcelona

Tournament statistics
- Matches played: 59
- Goals scored: 167 (2.83 per match)
- Attendance: 1,549,647 (26,265 per match)
- Top scorer(s): Torbjörn Nilsson (IFK Göteborg); 7 goals

The 1985–86 European Cup was the 31st season of the European Cup, UEFA's premier club football competition. The European Champion Clubs' Cup was won by Steaua București on penalties in the final against Barcelona. Steaua became the first Eastern Bloc side to win the tournament. The final was decided mainly by goalkeeper Helmut Duckadam, who (after keeping a clean sheet in the final) saved all four of Barcelona's penalties to secure the cup.

Juventus, the defending champions, were eliminated by Barcelona in the quarter-finals.

No clubs from England were entered into the competition during this year, owing to a ban from European competition in light of the Heysel Stadium disaster. Had the ban not been imposed, Everton would have represented England. The Albanian champions 17 Nëntori were disqualified following a ban in the previous CWC edition.

== Teams ==
Austria Wien (1st)	(Belgium) Anderlecht (1st)	(Bulgaria) Botev Plovdiv (3rd)	(Cyprus) Omonia (1st)
(Czechoslovakia) Sparta Praha (1st)	(Denmark) Vejle (1st)	(Finland) Kuusysi (1st)	(France) Bordeaux (1st)
(East Germany) BFC Dynamo (1st)	(West Germany) Bayern Munich (1st)	(Greece) PAOK (1st)	(Hungary) Budapesti Honvéd (1st)
(Iceland) ÍA (1st)	(Republic of Ireland) Shamrock Rovers (1st)	(Italy) Hellas Verona (1st)	(Italy) Juventus (6th)^{TH}
(Luxembourg) Jeunesse Esch (1st)	(Malta) Rabat Ajax (1st)	(Netherlands) Ajax (1st)	(Northern Ireland) Linfield (1st)
(Norway) Vålerenga (1st)	(Poland) Górnik Zabrze (1st)	(Portugal) Porto (1st)	(Romania) Steaua București (1st)
(Scotland) Aberdeen (1st)	(Spain) Barcelona (1st)	(Sweden) Gothenburg (1st)	(Switzerland) Servette (1st)
(Turkey) Fenerbahçe (1st)	(Soviet Union) Zenit Leningrad (1st)	(Socialist Federal Republic of Yugoslavia) Sarajevo (1st)	

The draw for the first round of the European competitions took place in Geneva on Thursday 4 July 1985 at 12 CEST. Restrictions based on seedings and geography were unilaterally decided by the UEFA.

== Bracket ==
First Round
(Northern Ireland) Linfield	1	2	3
(Switzerland) Servette	2	2	4
(Iceland) ÍA	1	1	2
(Scotland) Aberdeen	3	4	7
(Sweden) IFK Göteborg	3	2	5
(Bulgaria) Botev Plovdiv	2	1	3
(France) Bordeaux	2	0	2
(Turkey) Fenerbahçe	3	0	3
(Czechoslovakia) Sparta Praha	1	1	2
(Spain) Barcelona (a)	2	0	2
(Portugal) Porto	2	0	2
(Netherlands) Ajax	0	0	0
(Italy) Hellas Verona	3	2	5
(Greece) PAOK	1	1	2
(Luxembourg) Jeunesse Esch	0	1	1
(Italy) Juventus	5	4	9
(Poland) Górnik Zabrze	1	1	2
(West Germany) Bayern Munich	2	4	6
(East Germany) BFC Dynamo	0	1	1
Austria Wien	2	2	4
(Malta) Rabat Ajax	0	0	0
(Cyprus) Omonia	5	5	10
(Hungary) Honvéd	2	3	5
(Republic of Ireland) Shamrock Rovers	0	1	1
(Denmark) Vejle	1	1	2
(Romania) Steaua București	1	4	5
(Soviet Union) Zenit	2	2	4
(Norway) Vålerenga	0	0	0
(Finland) Kuusysi	2	2	4
(Socialist Federal Republic of Yugoslavia) Sarajevo	1	1	2

Round of 16
(Switzerland) Servette	0	0	0
(Scotland) Aberdeen	0	1	1
(Sweden) IFK Göteborg	4	1	5
(Turkey) Fenerbahçe	0	2	2
(Spain) Barcelona (a)	2	1	3
(Portugal) Porto	0	3	3
(Italy) Hellas Verona	0	0	0
(Italy) Juventus	0	2	2
(West Germany) Bayern Munich	4	3	7
Austria Wien	2	3	5
(Belgium) Anderlecht	1	3	4
(Cyprus) Omonia	0	1	1
(Hungary) Honvéd	1	1	2
(Romania) Steaua București	0	4	4
(Soviet Union) Zenit	2	1	3
(Finland) Kuusysi	1	3	4

Quarter-finals
(Scotland) Aberdeen	2	0	2
(Sweden) IFK Göteborg (a)	2	0	2
(Spain) Barcelona	1	1	2
(Italy) Juventus	0	1	1
(West Germany) Bayern Munich	2	0	2
(Belgium) Anderlecht	1	2	3
(Romania) Steaua București	0	1	1
(Finland) Kuusysi	0	0	0

Semi-finals
(Sweden) IFK Göteborg	3	0	3 (4)
(Spain) Barcelona	0	3	3 (5)
(Belgium) Anderlecht	1	0	1
(Romania) Steaua București	0	3	3

Final
(Spain) Barcelona	0 (0)
(Romania) Steaua București	0 (2)

== First round ==
Team 1	Agg.	Team 2	1st leg	2nd leg
Górnik Zabrze (Poland)	2–6	(West Germany) Bayern Munich	1–2	1–4
BFC Dynamo (East Germany)	1–4	Austria Wien	0–2	1–2
Rabat Ajax (Malta)	0–10	(Cyprus) Omonia	0–5	0–5
Budapest Honvéd (Hungary)	5–1	(Republic of Ireland) Shamrock Rovers	2–0	3–1
Vejle (Denmark)	2–5	(Romania) Steaua București	1–1	1–4
Zenit Leningrad (Soviet Union)	4–0	(Norway) Vålerenga	2–0	2–0
Kuusysi (Finland)	4–2	(Socialist Federal Republic of Yugoslavia) Sarajevo	2–1	2–1
Linfield (Northern Ireland)	3–4	(Switzerland) Servette	2–2	1–2
ÍA (Iceland)	2–7	(Scotland) Aberdeen	1–3	1–4
IFK Göteborg (Sweden)	5–3	(Bulgaria) Botev Plovdiv	3–2	2–1
Bordeaux (France)	2–3	(Turkey) Fenerbahçe	2–3	0–0
Sparta Prague (Czechoslovakia)	2–2 (a)	(Spain) Barcelona	1–2	1–0
Porto (Portugal)	2–0	(Netherlands) Ajax	2–0	0–0
Hellas Verona (Italy)	5–2	(Greece) PAOK	3–1	2–1
Jeunesse Esch (Luxembourg)	1–9	(Italy) Juventus	0–5	1–4

The Belgian club Anderlecht received a bye from the first round.

=== First leg ===
18 September 1985

Górnik Zabrze (Poland)	1–2	(West Germany) Bayern Munich
Pałasz 32'	Report	Wohlfarth 20'; Hoeneß 81'

Stadion Śląski, Chorzów
Attendance: 50,800
Referee: Gérard Biguet (France)

18 September 1985

BFC Dynamo (East Germany)	0–2	Austria Wien
	Report	Ullrich 4' (o.g.); Polster 12'

Friedrich-Ludwig-Jahn-Stadion, East Berlin
Attendance: 19,875-21,000
Referee: Marcel Van Langenhove (Belgium)

18 September 1985

Rabat Ajax (Malta)	0–5	(Cyprus) Omonia
	Report	Savvidis 16', 71'; Andreou 49', 55' (pen.); Cortis 86' (o.g.)

Grawnd Nazzjonali Ta' Qali, Ta' Qali
Attendance: 2,751
Referee: Mircea Neşu (Romania)

18 September 1985

Budapest Honvéd (Hungary)	2–0	(Republic of Ireland) Shamrock Rovers
Dajka 36'; Détári 67'	Report

Illovszky Rudolf Stadion (1960)
Attendance: 1,500
Referee: Plarent Kotherja (Albania)

18 September 1985

Vejle (Denmark)	1–1	(Romania) Steaua București
Barnett 61'	Report	Radu 89'

Vejle Stadion, Vejle
Attendance: 4,500
Referee: Werner Föckler (West Germany)

18 September 1985

Zenit Leningrad (Soviet Union)	2–0	(Norway) Vålerenga
Dmitriev 54'; Zheludkov 75' (pen.)	Report

Kirov Stadium, Leningrad
Attendance: 51,000
Referee: Berisha Şinasi (Yugoslavia)

18 September 1985

Kuusysi (Finland)	2–1	(Socialist Federal Republic of Yugoslavia) Sarajevo
Hudd 10'; Kousa 51'	Report	Teskeredžić 42'

Lahden Stadion, Lahti
Attendance: 2,000
Referee: Klaus Peschel (East Germany)

18 September 1985

Linfield (Northern Ireland)	2–2	(Switzerland) Servette
Anderson 1'; McKeown 89'	Report	Magnusson 18', 44'

Windsor Park, Belfast
Attendance: 2,898
Referee: Ib Nielsen (Denmark)

18 September 1985

ÍA (Iceland)	1–3	(Scotland) Aberdeen
Ingólfsson 37'	Report	Black 53'; Hewitt 58'; Stark 60'

Attendance: 1,871
Referee: Thorbjørn Aas (Norway)

18 September 1985

IFK Göteborg (Sweden)	3–2	(Bulgaria) Botev Plovdiv
Larsson 14'; Tommy Holmgren 61'; Nilsson 73'	Report	Simov 33'; Kostadinov 90' (pen.)

Ullevi, Gothenburg
Attendance: 11,192
Referee: Neil Midgley (England)

18 September 1985

Bordeaux (France)	2–3	(Turkey) Fenerbahçe
Pascal 55'; Hanini 75'	Report	Yula 20'; Çorlu 59'; Çakıroğlu 78'

Parc Lescure, Bordeaux
Attendance: 18,982
Referee: José dos Santos (Portugal)

18 September 1985

Sparta Prague (Czechoslovakia)	1–2	(Spain) Barcelona
Calta 7'	Report	Clos 50', 70'

Stadion Letná, Prague
Attendance: 30,501
Referee: Ulf Eriksson (Sweden)

18 September 1985

Porto (Portugal)	2–0	(Netherlands) Ajax
Futre 5'; Celso 59'	Report

Estádio das Antas, Porto
Attendance: 50,000
Referee: Pietro D'Elia (Italy)

18 September 1985

Hellas Verona (Italy)	3–1	(Greece) PAOK
Elkjær 15', 85'; Volpati 87'	Report	Skartados 70'

Stadio Marcantonio Bentegodi, Verona
Attendance: 26,998
Referee: Horst Brummeier (Austria)

18 September 1985

Jeunesse Esch (Luxembourg)	0–5	(Italy) Juventus
	Report	Laudrup 21'; Cabrini 35'; Ontano 42' (o.g.); Serena 80', 83'

Stade Municipal, Luxembourg
Attendance: 8,000
Referee: Philippe Mercier (Switzerland)

=== Second leg ===
2 October 1985

Bayern Munich (West Germany)	4–1	(Poland) Górnik Zabrze
Winklhofer 23'; Hartmann 55'; Pflügler 73'; Hoeneß 85'	Report	Majka 17'

Olympiastadion, Munich
Attendance: 13,500
Referee: Howard King (Wales)

Bayern Munich won 6–2 on aggregate.

2 October 1985

Austria Wien	2–1	(East Germany) BFC Dynamo
Nyilasi 60'; Steinkogler 82'	Report	Schulz 90'

Attendance: 9,500
Referee: Robert Wurtz (France)

Austria Wien won 4–1 on aggregate.

2 October 1985

Omonia (Cyprus)	5–0	(Malta) Rabat Ajax
Georgiou 4'; Christofi 12'; Teophanous 45', 68'; Andreou 68'	Report

GSP Stadium, Nikosia
Attendance: 7,798
Referee: Dimitar Charlatchki (Bulgaria)

Omonia won 10–0 on aggregate.

2 October 1985

Shamrock Rovers (Republic of Ireland)	1–3	(Hungary) Budapest Honvéd
Coady 84'	Report	Détári 69', 74'; Cseh 85'

Glenmalure Park, Dublin
Attendance: 4,500
Referee: Alan Ferguson (Scotland)

Budapest Honvéd won 5–1 on aggregate.

2 October 1985

Steaua București (Romania)	4–1	(Denmark) Vejle
Pițurcă 8'; Bölöni 34'; Balint 51'; Stoica 74'	Report	Simonsen 37'

Stadionul Steaua, Bucharest
Attendance: 20,000
Referee: Rosario Lo Bello (Italy)

Steaua București won 5–2 on aggregate.

2 October 1985

Vålerenga (Norway)	0–2	(Soviet Union) Zenit Leningrad
	Report	Dmitriev 78'; Vedeneev 83'

Bislett Stadion, Oslo
Attendance: 2,482
Referee: Osmo Orakangas (Finland)

Zenit Leningrad won 4–0 on aggregate.

2 October 1985

Sarajevo (Socialist Federal Republic of Yugoslavia)	1–2	(Finland) Kuusysi
Vukićević 32' (pen.)	Report	Lius 13', 15'

Olimpijski Gradski Stadion Koševo, Sarajevo
Attendance: 9,000
Referee: Hristos Kolokithas (Greece)

Kuusysi won 4–2 on aggregate.

2 October 1985

Servette (Switzerland)	2–1	(Northern Ireland) Linfield
Magnusson 43'; Jaccard 50'	Report	Anderson 22'

Stade des Charmilles, Geneve
Attendance: 11,600
Referee: Bela Szabo (Hungary)

Servette won 4–3 on aggregate.

2 October 1985

Aberdeen (Scotland)	4–1	(Iceland) ÍA
Simpson 5'; Hewitt 63'; Gray 65'; Falconer 67'	Report	Jóhannesson 31'

Pittodrie Stadium, Aberdeen
Attendance: 14,709
Referee: John Kinsella (Ireland)

Aberdeen won 7–2 on aggregate.

2 October 1985

Botev Plovdiv (Bulgaria)	1–2	(Sweden) IFK Göteborg
Kostadinov 44'	Report	Pettersson 25'; Nilsson 88'

Kolezha, Plovdiv
Attendance: 25,000
Referee: André Daina (Switzerland)

IFK Göteborg won 5–3 on aggregate.

2 October 1985

Fenerbahçe (Turkey)	0–0	(France) Bordeaux
	Report

İnönü Stadyumu, Istanbul
Attendance: 40,000
Referee: Edvard Sostarić (Yugoslavia)

Fenerbahçe won 3–2 on aggregate.

2 October 1985

Barcelona (Spain)	0–1	(Czechoslovakia) Sparta Prague
	Report	Griga 8'

Camp Nou, Barcelona
Attendance: 42,000
Referee: Karl-Heinz Tritschler (Germany)

2–2 on aggregate; Barcelona won on away goals.

2 October 1985

Ajax (Netherlands)	0–0	(Portugal) Porto
	Report

Olympisch Stadion, Amsterdam
Attendance: 49,000
Referee: Dušan Krchňák (Czechoslovakia)

Porto won 2–0 on aggregate.

2 October 1985

PAOK (Greece)	1–2	(Italy) Hellas Verona
Vasilakos 4'	Report	Elkjær 29', 73'

Stádio Toúmpas, Thessaloniki
Attendance: 28,483
Referee: Augusto Lamo Castillo (Spain)

Hellas Verona won 5–2 on aggregate.

2 October 1985

Juventus (Italy)	4–1	(Luxembourg) Jeunesse Esch
Platini 23'; Pin 50'; Serena 52' (pen.), 64'	Report	Guillot 67'

Stadio Comunale, Turin
Attendance: 96
Referee: José Miguel Pérez (Spain)

Juventus won 9–1 on aggregate.

== Second round ==
Team 1	Agg.	Team 2	1st leg	2nd leg
Bayern Munich (West Germany)	7–5	Austria Wien	4–2	3–3
Anderlecht (Belgium)	4–1	(Cyprus) Omonia	1–0	3–1
Budapest Honvéd (Hungary)	2–4	(Romania) Steaua București	1–0	1–4
Zenit Leningrad (Soviet Union)	3–4	(Finland) Kuusysi	2–1	1–3
Servette (Switzerland)	0–1	(Scotland) Aberdeen	0–0	0–1
IFK Göteborg (Sweden)	5–2	(Turkey) Fenerbahçe	4–0	1–2
Barcelona (Spain)	3–3 (a)	(Portugal) Porto	2–0	1–3
Hellas Verona (Italy)	0–2	(Italy) Juventus	0–0	0–2

=== First leg ===
23 October 1985

Bayern Munich (West Germany)	4–2	Austria Wien
Mathy 11', 22', 57'; Rummenigge 13'	Report	Steinkogler 9'; Polster 73' (pen.)

Olympiastadion, Munich
Attendance: 64,000
Referee: André Daina (Switzerland)

23 October 1985

Anderlecht (Belgium)	1–0	(Cyprus) Omonia
Vandenbergh 43'	Report

Constant Vanden Stock Stadium, Anderlecht
Attendance: 14,000
Referee: Charles Gilson (Luxembourg)

23 October 1985

Budapest Honvéd (Hungary)	1–0	(Romania) Steaua București
Détári 33'	Report

Fáy utcai, Budapest
Attendance: 4,000
Referee: Ron Bridges (Wales)

23 October 1985

Zenit Leningrad (Soviet Union)	2–1	(Finland) Kuusysi
Zheludkov 76' (pen.), 90' (pen.)	Report	Lius 7'

Kirov Stadium, Leningrad
Attendance: 32,000
Referee: Þorvarður Björnsson (Iceland)

23 October 1985

Servette (Switzerland)	0–0	(Scotland) Aberdeen
	Report

Stade des Charmilles, Geneve
Attendance: 7,080
Referee: Zoran Petrović (Yugoslavia)

23 October 1985

IFK Göteborg (Sweden)	4–0	(Turkey) Fenerbahçe
Pettersson 7'; Nilsson 10', 70', 78'	Report

Ullevi, Gothenburg
Attendance: 21,606
Referee: Siegfried Kirschen (East Germany)

23 October 1985

Barcelona (Spain)	2–0	(Portugal) Porto
Alonso 52'; Schuster 70'	Report

Camp Nou, Barcelona
Attendance: 66,000
Referee: Marcel Van Langenhove (Belgium)

23 October 1985

Hellas Verona (Italy)	0–0	(Italy) Juventus
	Report

Stadio Marcantonio Bentegodi, Verona
Attendance: 38,866
Referee: Bob Valentine (Scotland)

=== Second leg ===
6 November 1985

Austria Wien	3–3	(West Germany) Bayern Munich
Drabits 3'; Polster 71', 86' (pen.)	Report	Wohlfarth 37'; Nachtweih 80'; Rummenigge 88'

Gerhard-Hanappi-Stadion, Vienna
Attendance: 17,000
Referee: Paolo Casarin (Italy)

Bayern Munich won 7–5 on aggregate.

6 November 1985

Omonia (Cyprus)	1–3	(Belgium) Anderlecht
Andreou 30'	Report	Frimann 17', 34'; Grün 70'

Makario Stadium, Nicosia
Attendance: 21,500
Referee: Plarent Kotherja (Albania)

Anderlecht won 4–1 on aggregate.

6 November 1985

Steaua București (Romania)	4–1	(Hungary) Budapest Honvéd
Pițurcă 1'; Lăcătuș 35'; Bărbulescu 46'; Majearu 52' (pen.)	Report	Détári 64' (pen.)

Stadionul Steaua, Bucharest
Attendance: 21,000
Referee: Horst Brummeier (Austria)

Steaua București won 4–2 on aggregate.

6 November 1985

Kuusysi (Finland)	3–1 (a.e.t.)	(Soviet Union) Zenit Leningrad
Lius 59', 69'; Kaivonurmi 112'	Report	Klementyev 60'

Lahden Kisapuisto, Lahti
Attendance: 2,893
Referee: Aleksander Suchanek (Poland)

Kuusysi won 4–3 on aggregate.

6 November 1985

Aberdeen (Scotland)	1–0	(Switzerland) Servette
McDougall 23'	Report

Pittodrie Stadium, Aberdeen
Attendance: 18,751
Referee: Augusto Lamo Castillo (Spain)

Aberdeen won 1–0 on aggregate.

6 November 1985

Fenerbahçe (Turkey)	2–1	(Sweden) IFK Göteborg
Tüfekçi 64'; Tüzün 75'	Report	Larsson 61'

Fenerbahçe Stadyumu, Istanbul
Attendance: 7,900
Referee: George Courtney (England)

IFK Göteborg won 5–2 on aggregate.

6 November 1985

Porto (Portugal)	3–1	(Spain) Barcelona
Juary 67', 70', 88'	Report	Archibald 73'

Estádio das Antas, Porto
Attendance: 40,000
Referee: Brian McGinlay (Scotland)

3–3 on aggregate; Barcelona won on away goals.

6 November 1985

Juventus (Italy)	2–0	(Italy) Hellas Verona
Platini 19' (pen.); Serena 50'	Report

Stadio Comunale, Turin
Attendance: 393
Referee: Robert Wurtz (France)

Juventus won 2–0 on aggregate.

== Quarter-finals ==
Team 1	Agg.	Team 2	1st leg	2nd leg
Bayern Munich (West Germany)	2–3	(Belgium) Anderlecht	2–1	0–2
Steaua București (Romania)	1–0	(Finland) Kuusysi	0–0	1–0
Aberdeen (Scotland)	2–2 (a)	(Sweden) IFK Göteborg	2–2	0–0
Barcelona (Spain)	2–1	(Italy) Juventus	1–0	1–1

=== First leg ===
5 March 1986
19:15

Bayern Munich (West Germany)	2–1	(Belgium) Anderlecht
Hoeneß 13'; Wohlfarth 32'	Report	Andersen 72'

Olympiastadion, Munich
Attendance: 23,000
Referee: Keith Hackett (England)

5 March 1986
14:00

Steaua București (Romania)	0–0	(Finland) Kuusysi
	Report

Stadionul Steaua, Bucharest
Attendance: 25,000
Referee: Franz Gächter (Switzerland)

5 March 1986
18:30

Aberdeen (Scotland)	2–2	(Sweden) IFK Göteborg
Miller 16'; Hewitt 80'	Report	Holmgren 43'; Ekström 89'

Pittodrie Stadium, Aberdeen
Attendance: 22,000
Referee: Dieter Pauly (West Germany)

5 March 1986
20:15

Barcelona (Spain)	1–0	(Italy) Juventus
Julio Alberto 82'	Report

Camp Nou, Barcelona
Attendance: 102,592
Referee: Erik Fredriksson (Sweden)

=== Second leg ===
19 March 1986
19:00

Anderlecht (Belgium)	2–0	(West Germany) Bayern Munich
Scifo 39'; Frimann 45'	Report

Constant Vanden Stock Stadium, Brussels
Attendance: 31,000
Referee: Ángel Franco Martínez (Spain)

Anderlecht won 3–2 on aggregate.

19 March 1986
17:30

Kuusysi (Finland)	0–1	(Romania) Steaua București
	Report	Pițurcă 86'

Olympic Stadium, Helsinki
Attendance: 32,522
Referee: Vojtech Christov (Czechoslovakia)

Steaua București won 1–0 on aggregate.

19 March 1986
18:00

IFK Göteborg (Sweden)	0–0	(Scotland) Aberdeen
	Report

Ullevi, Gothenburg
Attendance: 44,152
Referee: Franz Wöhrer (Austria)

2–2 on aggregate; IFK Göteborg won on away goals.

19 March 1986
19:30

Juventus (Italy)	1–1	(Spain) Barcelona
Platini 44'	Report	Archibald 32'

Stadio Comunale, Turin
Attendance: 58,169
Referee: Jan Keizer (Netherlands)

Barcelona won 2–1 on aggregate.

== Semi-finals ==
Team 1	Agg.	Team 2	1st leg	2nd leg
Anderlecht (Belgium)	1–3	(Romania) Steaua București	1–0	0–3
IFK Göteborg (Sweden)	3–3 (4–5p)	(Spain) Barcelona	3–0	0–3

=== First leg ===
2 April 1986
19:00

Anderlecht (Belgium)	1–0	(Romania) Steaua București
Scifo 78'	Report

Constant Vanden Stock, Brussels
Attendance: 24,000
Referee: Adolf Prokop (East Germany)

2 April 1986

IFK Göteborg (Sweden)	3–0	(Spain) Barcelona
T. Nilsson 24', 44'; Holmgren 60'	Report

Ullevi, Gothenburg
Attendance: 44,103
Referee: Vojtech Christov (Czechoslovakia)

=== Second leg ===
16 April 1986
15:30

Steaua București (Romania)	3–0	(Belgium) Anderlecht
Pițurcă 4', 71'; Balint 23'	Report

Stadionul Steaua, Bucharest
Attendance: 20,584
Referee: Volker Roth (West Germany)

Steaua București won 3–1 on aggregate.

16 April 1986

Barcelona (Spain)	3–0 (a.e.t.)	(Sweden) IFK Göteborg
Pichi 9', 63', 69'	Report
Penalties
Alexanko (penalty scored); Pedraza (penalty scored); Carrasco (penalty missed); Calderé (penalty scored); Urruti (penalty scored); Víctor (penalty scored)	5–4	(penalty scored) Pettersson; (penalty scored) M. Andersson; (penalty scored) Larsson; (penalty scored) Fredriksson; (penalty missed) R. Nilsson; (penalty missed) Mordt

Camp Nou, Barcelona
Attendance: 120,000
Referee: Paolo Casarin (Italy)

3–3 on aggregate; Barcelona won on penalties.

== Final ==
7 May 1986
19:15

Barcelona (Spain)	0–0 (a.e.t.)	(Romania) Steaua București
	Report MatchCentre
Penalties
Alexanko (penalty missed); Pedraza (penalty missed); Alonso (penalty missed); Marcos (penalty missed)	0–2	(penalty missed) Majearu; (penalty missed) Bölöni; (penalty scored) Lăcătuș; (penalty scored) Balint

Ramón Sánchez Pizjuán, Seville
Attendance: 65,000
Referee: Michel Vautrot (France)

== Top scorers ==
The top scorers from the 1985–86 European Cup are as follows:

Rank	Name	Team	Goals
1	(Sweden) Torbjörn Nilsson	(Sweden) IFK Göteborg	7
2	(Hungary) Lajos Détári	(Hungary) Budapest Honvéd	5
2	(Finland) Ismo Lius	(Finland) Kuusysi	5
2	(Romania) Victor Pițurcă	(Romania) Steaua București	5
2	(Italy) Aldo Serena	(Italy) Juventus	5
6	(Denmark) Preben Elkjær	(Italy) Hellas Verona	4
6	(Cyprus) Andreas Andreou	(Cyprus) Omonia	4
6	(Austria) Toni Polster	Austria Wien	4
9	(Spain) Pichi Alonso	(Spain) Barcelona	3
9	(Denmark) Per Frimann	(Belgium) Anderlecht	3
9	(Scotland) John Hewitt	(Scotland) Aberdeen	3
9	(Germany) Dieter Hoeneß	(Germany) Bayern Munich	3
9	(Brazil) Juary	(Portugal) Porto	3
9	(Sweden) Mats Magnusson	(Switzerland) Servette	3
9	(Germany) Reinhold Mathy	(Germany) Bayern Munich	3
9	(France) Michel Platini	(Italy) Juventus	3
9	(Germany) Roland Wohlfarth	(Germany) Bayern Munich	3
9	(Soviet Union) Yuri Zheludkov	(Soviet Union) Zenit Leningrad	3
