= 1979–80 Cypriot Second Division =

Cypriot Second Division
- Season: 1979–80
- Champions: Nea Salamis Famagusta FC (2nd title)
- Promoted: Nea Salamis Famagusta FC
- Relegated: ASIL Lysi; Ethnikos Assia FC

The 1979–80 Cypriot Second Division was the 25th season of the Cypriot second-level football league. Nea Salamis Famagusta FC won their 2nd title.

== Format ==
Fourteen teams participated in the 1979–80 Cypriot Second Division. All teams played against each other twice, once at their home and once away. The team with the most points at the end of the season crowned champions. The first team was promoted to 1980–81 Cypriot First Division. The last two teams were relegated to the 1980–81 Cypriot Third Division.

== Changes from previous season ==
Teams promoted to 1979–80 Cypriot First Division

- Keravnos Strovolou FC

Teams relegated from 1978–79 Cypriot First Division

- Nea Salamis Famagusta FC
- Digenis Akritas Morphou FC

Teams promoted from 1978–79 Cypriot Third Division

- Orfeas Nicosia

Teams relegated to 1979–80 Cypriot Third Division

- Iraklis Gerolakkou
- Parthenon Zodeia

== League standings ==
Pos	Team	Pld	W	D	L	GF	GA	GD	Pts	Promotion or relegation
1	Nea Salamis Famagusta FC (C, P)	26	–	–	–	70	14	+56	43	Promoted to Cypriot First Division
2	Orfeas Nicosia	26	–	–	–	46	30	+16	40	
3	Ethnikos Achna FC	26	–	–	–	54	25	+29	37	
4	Othellos Athienou FC	26	–	–	–	28	29	−1	34	
5	Chalkanoras Idaliou	26	–	–	–	42	36	+6	28	
6	Adonis Idaliou	26	–	–	–	48	43	+5	27	
7	Ermis Aradippou FC	26	–	–	–	32	37	−5	25	
8	Digenis Akritas Morphou FC	26	–	–	–	31	41	−10	25	
9	Akritas Chlorakas	26	–	–	–	27	40	−13	21	
10	PAEEK FC	26	–	–	–	29	33	−4	21	
11	Neos Aionas Trikomou	26	–	–	–	24	47	−23	20	
12	AEM Morphou	26	–	–	–	21	45	−24	18	
13	ASIL Lysi (R)	26	–	–	–	22	34	−12	13	Relegated to Cypriot Third Division
14	Ethnikos Assia FC (R)	26	–	–	–	23	43	−20	13	Relegated to Cypriot Third Division

Rules for classification: 1) Points, 2) Goal differences, 3) Goal for. Points system: Won=2 points, Drawn=1 point, Lost=0 points.
(C) Champions; (P) Promoted; (R) Relegated

== See also ==
- Cypriot Second Division
- 1979–80 Cypriot First Division
- 1979–80 Cypriot Cup
