= 1973–74 Cypriot Second Division =

Cypriot Second Division
- Season: 1973–74
- Champions: ASIL Lysi (2nd title)
- Promoted: ASIL Lysi
- Relegated: Ethnikos Asteras Limassol

The 1973–74 Cypriot Second Division was the 19th season of the Cypriot second-level football league. ASIL Lysi won their 2nd title.

== Format ==
Fourteen teams participated in the 1973–74 Cypriot Second Division. All teams played against each other twice, once at their home and once away. The team with the most points at the end of the season crowned champions. The first team was promoted to 1974–75 Cypriot First Division. The last team was relegated to the Cypriot Third Division.

== Changes from previous season ==
Teams promoted to 1973–74 Cypriot First Division

- APOP Paphos FC

Teams relegated from 1972–73 Cypriot First Division

- ASIL Lysi

Teams promoted from 1972–73 Cypriot Third Division

- Neos Aionas Trikomou

Teams relegated to 1973–74 Cypriot Third Division

- AEK Ammochostos

== League standings ==
Pos	Team	Pld	W	D	L	GF	GA	GD	Pts	Promotion or relegation
1	ASIL Lysi (C, P)	26	20	4	2	16	21	−5	44	Promoted to Cypriot First Division
2	AEM Morphou	26	15	6	5	41	23	+18	36	
3	Ethnikos Achna FC	26	13	6	7	52	33	+19	32	
4	Keravnos Strovolou FC	26	14	6	6	33	29	+4	34	
5	Neos Aionas Trikomou	26	13	5	8	41	27	+14	31	
6	Chalkanoras Idaliou	26	13	5	8	33	24	+9	31	
7	Othellos Athienou FC	26	12	6	8	35	25	+10	30	
8	Ethnikos Assia FC	26	9	13	4	25	24	+1	31	
9	Omonia Aradippou	26	11	5	10	33	32	+1	27	
10	PAEEK FC	26	5	7	14	26	34	−8	17	
11	Parthenon Zodeia	26	5	7	14	20	41	−21	17	
12	Orfeas Nicosia	26	6	4	16	25	37	−12	16	
13	ENAD Ayiou Dometiou FC	26	2	9	15	11	46	−35	13	
14	Ethnikos Asteras Limassol (R)	26	1	3	22	13	86	−73	5	Relegated to Cypriot Third Division

Rules for classification: 1) Points, 2) Goal differences, 3) Goal for. Points system: Won=2 points, Drawn=1 point, Lost=0 points.
(C) Champions; (P) Promoted; (R) Relegated

== See also ==
- Cypriot Second Division
- 1973–74 Cypriot First Division
- 1973–74 Cypriot Cup
