= 1973–74 Cypriot Cup =

Tournament details
- Country: Cyprus
- Dates: 6 March 1974 – 23 June 1974
- Teams: 40

Final positions
- Champions: AC Omonia (3rd title)
- Runners-up: Enosis Neon Paralimni

The 1973–74 Cypriot Cup was the 32nd edition of the Cypriot Cup. A total of 40 clubs entered the competition. It began on 6 March 1974 with the preliminary round and concluded on 23 June 1974 with the final which was held at GSP Stadium. AC Omonia won their 3rd Cypriot Cup trophy after beating Enosis Neon Paralimni 2–0 in the final.

== Format ==
In the 1973–74 Cypriot Cup, participated all the teams of the Cypriot First Division, the Cypriot Second Division and the Cypriot Third Division.

The competition consisted of six knock-out rounds. In all rounds each tie was played as a single leg and was held at the home ground of one of the two teams, according to the draw results. Each tie winner was qualifying to the next round. If a match was drawn, extra time was following. If extra time was drawn, there was a replay at the ground of the team who were away for the first game. If the rematch was also drawn, then extra time was following and if the match remained drawn after extra time the winner was decided by penalty shoot-out.

The cup winner secured a place in the 1974–75 European Cup Winners' Cup.

== Preliminary round ==
In the preliminary round participated 4 teams of 1973–74 Cypriot Second Division and all 12 teams of 1973–74 Cypriot Third Division.

Team 1	Agg.	Team 2	1st leg	2nd leg
(C) Akritas Chlorakas	1 - 2	Faros Acropoleos (C)	1 - 0	0 - 2
(C) Achilleas Kaimakli	2 - 4	Doxa Katokopias (C)	2 - 2	0 - 2
(C) Anagennisi Deryneia	3 - 2	AEK Ammochostos (C)	1 - 0	2 - 2
(C) Ermis Aradippou	3 - 0	Parthenon Zodeia (B)	1 - 0	2 - 0
(C) Iraklis Gerolakkou	1 - 0	ASOB Vatili (C)	0 - 0	1 - 0
(C) AEK Karava	4 - 0	ENAD Ayiou Dometiou (B)	2 - 0	2 - 0
(C) AEK Kythreas	3 - 4	Ethnikos Asteras Limassol (B)	1 - 0	2 - 4
(B) Orfeas Nicosia	3 - 1	LALL Lysi (C)	1 - 0	2 - 1

== First round ==
14 clubs from the 1973–74 Cypriot First Division and 10 clubs from the 1973–74 Cypriot Second Division were added.

Team 1	Agg.	Team 2	1st leg	2nd leg
(A) Alki Larnaca	8 - 0	Orfeas Nicosia (B)	4 - 0	4 - 0
(A) APOP Paphos	12 - 0	Ethnikos Asteras Limassol (B)	10 - 0	2 - 0
(B) Omonia Aradippou	1 - 3	Keravnos Strovolou (B)	0 - 0	1 - 3
(A) Aris Limassol	6 - 0	Ermis Aradippou (C)	3 - 0	3 - 0
(B) ASIL Lysi	3 - 0	AEM Morphou (B)	2 - 0	1 - 0
(B) Ethnikos Assia	3 - 4	Olympiakos Nicosia (A)	2 - 1	1 - 3
(B) Ethnikos Achna	1 - 5	AEL Limassol (A)	1 - 1	0 - 4
(C) Anagennisi Deryneia	0 - 7	Apollon Limassol (A)	0 - 3	0 - 4
(A) Digenis Akritas Morphou	6 - 0	AEK Karava (C)	2 - 0	4 - 0
(C) Doxa Katokopias	1 - 9	Anorthosis Famagusta (A)	0 - 3	1 - 6
(C) Iraklis Gerolakkou	0 - 7	EPA Larnaca (A)	0 - 3	0 - 4
(A) AC Omonia	7 - 1	Neos Aionas Trikomou (B)	2 - 1	5 - 0
(B) PAEEK	2 - 4	Evagoras Paphos (A)	2 - 1	0 - 3
(A) Enosis Neon Paralimni	7 - 2	Faros Acropoleos (C)	3 - 0	4 - 2
(A) Pezoporikos Larnaca	2 - 1	Othellos Athienou (B)	1 - 0	1 - 1
(B) Chalkanoras Idaliou	1 - 4	Nea Salamis Famagusta (A)	0 - 1	1 - 3

== Second round ==
Team 1	Agg.	Team 2	1st leg	2nd leg
(A) AEL Limassol	2 - 3	ASIL Lysi (B)	1 - 1	1 - 2
(A) APOP Paphos	1 - 7	Olympiakos Nicosia (A)	1 - 1	0 - 6
(A) Aris Limassol	3 - 4	AC Omonia (A)	1 - 2	2 - 2
(A) Digenis Akritas Morphou	1 - 2	Apollon Limassol (A)	0 - 0	1 - 2
(A) EPA Larnaca	1 - 1 (a.)	Enosis Neon Paralimni (A)	1 - 1	0 - 0
(A) Evagoras Paphos	0 - 10	Anorthosis Famagusta (A)	0 - 3	0 - 7
(B) Keravnos Strovolou	0 - 11	Pezoporikos Larnaca (A)	0 - 6	0 - 5
(A) Nea Salamis Famagusta	1 - 3	Alki Larnaca (A)	1 - 0	0 - 3

== Quarter-finals ==
Team 1	Agg.	Team 2	1st leg	2nd leg
(A) Anorthosis Famagusta	3 - 0	Alki Larnaca (A)	2 - 0	1 - 0
(A) Apollon Limassol	4 - 2	Pezoporikos Larnaca (A)	4 - 1	0 - 1
(A) AC Omonia	3 - 1	Olympiakos Nicosia (A)	0 - 1	3 - 0
(A) Enosis Neon Paralimni	6 - 2	ASIL Lysi (B)	5 - 0	1 - 2

== Semi-finals ==
Team 1	Agg.	Team 2	1st leg	2nd leg
(A) Apollon Limassol	3 - 5	Enosis Neon Paralimni (A)	3 - 5	0 - 0
(A) AC Omonia	5 - 3	Anorthosis Famagusta (A)	4 - 1	1 - 2

== Final ==
23 June 1974

AC Omonia	2–0	Enosis Neon Paralimni
Vasos Kartabis 49'; Sotiris Kaiafas 75'

GSP Stadium, Nicosia

Cypriot Cup 1973–74 Winners
AC Omonia
3rd title

== Sources ==
- "1973/74 Cyprus Cup". Rec.Sport.Soccer Statistics Foundation. 2017-08-24.

== Bibliography ==
- Gavreilides, Michalis; Papamoiseos, Stelios (2001). Ένας αιώνας Κυπριακό ποδόσφαιρο [One century Cypriot football] (in Greek). Nicosia: The writer. pp. 94–95. ISBN 9963-8720-1-8.
- Stephanidis, Giorgos (2003). 40 χρόνια κυπριακές ομάδες στην Ευρώπη [40 years Cypriot teams in Europe] (in Greek). Nicosia: Haravgi. p. 83. ISBN 9963-8841-1-3.

== See also ==
- Cypriot Cup
- 1973–74 Cypriot First Division
