= 1983–84 Cypriot Second Division =

Cypriot Second Division
- Season: 1983–84
- Champions: Olympiakos Nicosia (1st title)
- Promoted: Olympiakos Nicosia; Evagoras Paphos
- Relegated: AEM Morphou; Kentro Neotitas Maroniton

The 1983–84 Cypriot Second Division was the 29th season of the Cypriot second-level football league. Olympiakos Nicosia won their 1st title.

== Format ==
Fourteen teams participated in the 1983–84 Cypriot Second Division. All teams played against each other twice, once at their home and once away. The team with the most points at the end of the season crowned champions. The first two teams were promoted to 1984–85 Cypriot First Division. The last two teams were relegated to the 1984–85 Cypriot Third Division.

== Changes from previous season ==
Teams promoted to 1983–84 Cypriot First Division

- Ermis Aradippou FC
- Ethnikos Achna FC

Teams relegated from 1982–83 Cypriot First Division

- Olympiakos Nicosia
- APOP Paphos FC

Teams promoted from 1982–83 Cypriot Third Division

- ENTHOI Lakatamia FC
- Doxa Katokopias FC

Teams relegated to 1983–84 Cypriot Third Division

- Adonis Idaliou
- Othellos Athienou FC

== League standings ==
Pos	Team	Pld	W	D	L	GF	GA	GD	Pts	Promotion or relegation
1	Olympiakos Nicosia (C, P)	26	–	–	–	65	23	+42	40	Promoted to Cypriot First Division
2	Evagoras Paphos (P)	26	–	–	–	51	17	+34	39	Promoted to Cypriot First Division
3	Keravnos Strovolou FC	26	–	–	–	47	19	+28	36	
4	APOP Paphos FC	26	–	–	–	40	13	+27	36	
5	Apollon Lympion	26	–	–	–	33	29	+4	29	
6	Anagennisi Deryneia FC	26	–	–	–	36	35	+1	28	
7	Orfeas Nicosia	26	–	–	–	38	30	+8	27	
8	Doxa Katokopias FC	26	–	–	–	28	35	−7	23	
9	PAEEK FC	26	–	–	–	22	35	−13	23	
10	ENTHOI Lakatamia FC	26	–	–	–	30	40	−10	22	
11	Digenis Akritas Ipsona	26	–	–	–	29	47	−18	21	
12	Chalkanoras Idaliou	26	–	–	–	28	39	−11	18	
13	AEM Morphou (R)	26	–	–	–	19	48	−29	14	Relegated to Cypriot Third Division
14	Kentro Neotitas Maroniton (R)	26	–	–	–	22	81	−59	6	Relegated to Cypriot Third Division

Rules for classification: 1) Points, 2) Goal differences, 3) Goal for. Points system: Won=2 points, Drawn=1 point, Lost=0 points.
(C) Champions; (P) Promoted; (R) Relegated

== See also ==
- Cypriot Second Division
- 1983–84 Cypriot First Division
- 1983–84 Cypriot Cup
