= 1980–81 Cypriot Second Division =

Cypriot Second Division
- Season: 1980–81
- Champions: Evagoras Paphos (3rd title)
- Promoted: Evagoras Paphos; APOP Paphos FC
- Relegated: Iraklis Gerolakkou; Neos Aionas Trikomou

The 1980–81 Cypriot Second Division was the 26th season of the Cypriot second-level football league. Evagoras Paphos won their 3rd title.

== Format ==
Fourteen teams participated in the 1980–81 Cypriot Second Division. All teams played against each other twice, once at their home and once away. The team with the most points at the end of the season crowned champions. The first two teams were promoted to 1981–82 Cypriot First Division. The last two teams were relegated to the 1981–82 Cypriot Third Division.

== Changes from previous season ==
Teams promoted to 1980–81 Cypriot First Division

- Nea Salamis Famagusta FC

Teams relegated from 1979–80 Cypriot First Division

- APOP Paphos FC
- Evagoras Paphos

Teams promoted from 1979–80 Cypriot Third Division

- Iraklis Gerolakkou

Teams relegated to 1980–81 Cypriot Third Division

- ASIL Lysi
- Ethnikos Assia FC

== League standings ==
Pos	Team	Pld	Pts	Promotion or relegation
1	Evagoras Paphos (C, P)	26	39	Promoted to Cypriot First Division
2	APOP Paphos FC (P)	26	36	Promoted to Cypriot First Division
3	AEM Morphou	26	32	
4	Ermis Aradippou FC	26	32	
5	Ethnikos Achna FC	26	30	
6	Chalkanoras Idaliou	26	28	
7	Orfeas Nicosia	26	26	
8	Adonis Idaliou	26	25	
9	PAEEK FC	26	21	
10	Othellos Athienou FC	26	21	
11	Digenis Akritas Morphou FC	26	21	
12	Akritas Chlorakas	26	21	
13	Iraklis Gerolakkou (R)	26	18	Relegated to Cypriot Third Division
14	Neos Aionas Trikomou (R)	26	13	Relegated to Cypriot Third Division

Rules for classification: 1) Points, 2) Goal differences, 3) Goal for. Points system: Won=2 points, Drawn=1 point, Lost=0 points.
(C) Champions; (P) Promoted; (R) Relegated

== See also ==
- Cypriot Second Division
- 1980–81 Cypriot First Division
- 1980–81 Cypriot Cup
