= 1983–84 Cypriot Cup =

Tournament details
- Country: Cyprus
- Dates: 13 November 1983 – 9 June 1984
- Teams: 41

Final positions
- Champions: APOEL (12th title)
- Runners-up: Pezoporikos

The 1983–84 Cypriot Cup was the 42nd edition of the Cypriot Cup. A total of 41 clubs entered the competition. It began on 13 November 1983 with the preliminary round and concluded on 9 June 1984 with the final which was held at Tsirion Stadium. APOEL won their 12th Cypriot Cup trophy after beating Pezoporikos 3–1 in the final.

== Format ==
In the 1983–84 Cypriot Cup, participated all the teams of the Cypriot First Division, the Cypriot Second Division and the Cypriot Third Division.

The competition consisted of six knock-out rounds. In all rounds each tie was played as a single leg and was held at the home ground of one of the two teams, according to the draw results. Each tie winner was qualifying to the next round. If a match was drawn, extra time was following. If extra time was drawn, there was a replay at the ground of the team who were away for the first game. If the rematch was also drawn, then extra time was following and if the match remained drawn after extra time the winner was decided by penalty shoot-out.

The cup winner secured a place in the 1984–85 European Cup Winners' Cup.

== Preliminary round ==
In the first preliminary draw, participated all the 14 teams of the Cypriot Third Division and 6 of the 14 teams of the Cypriot Second Division (last six of the league table of each group at the day of the draw).

One of the Cypriot Third Division teams was Ethnikos Defteras, a team which had been promoted from the amateur divisions. However, they were expelled from Cyprus Football Association after Cyprus' Court of Arbitration for Sport decision, after Doxa Paliometochou's objection based on a federation's regulation in which teams of villages with population under 1500 people couldn't join the federation. Ethnikos Defteras resorted to the court. Before the court's decision to be known, the draw of the preliminary round made, including Ethnikos Defteras. They were drawn against 1983–84 Cypriot Third Division team, Ethnikos Assia F.C. During the draw, Cyprus Football Association announced that if the court's decision hadn't been known in two weeks after the draw (and the other teams would have already played their qualifying matches), the opponent of Ethnikos Defteras would advance to the next round without playing any match, thing which it happened.

Team 1	Result	Team 2
(B) AEM Morphou	2 - 0	APEP F.C. (C)
(C) ASO Ormideia	1 - 0	Iraklis Gerolakkou (C)
(B) Anagennisi Deryneia	2 - 0	Orfeas Athienou (C)
(B) Kentro Neotitas Maroniton	0 - 4	Digenis Akritas Morphou (C)
(B) Doxa Katokopias F.C.	1 - 2	Elpida Xylofagou (C)
(B) ENTHOI Lakatamia FC	2 - 1	ASIL Lysi (C)
(C) Othellos Athienou F.C.	4 - 2	Akritas Chlorakas (C)
(C) Neos Aionas Trikomou	2 - 0	AEK Kythreas (C)
(B) Chalkanoras Idaliou	1 - 0	Adonis Idaliou (C)

== First round ==
14 clubs from the Cypriot First Division and the rest clubs from the Cypriot Second Division met the winners of the preliminary round ties:

Team 1	Result	Team 2
(A) Anorthosis Famagusta FC	0 - 0, 2 - 3 (aet)	Alki Larnaca F.C. (A)
(A) Apollon Limassol	3 - 1	Olympiakos Nicosia (B)
(C) Neos Aionas Trikomou	2 - 3 (aet)	Keravnos Strovolou FC (B)
(A) Omonia Aradippou	0 - 2	AC Omonia (A)
(C) ASO Ormideia	0 - 2	Evagoras Paphos (B)
(C) Ethnikos Assia F.C.	1 - 2	PAEEK FC (B)
(B) Anagennisi Deryneia	2 - 4	Ermis Aradippou (A)
(A) EPA Larnaca FC	1 - 1, 1 - 3	Enosis Neon Paralimni FC (A)
(B) ENTHOI Lakatamia FC	2 - 0	AEM Morphou (B)
(B) Apollon Lympion	3 - 0	APOP Paphos (B)
(C) Othellos Athienou F.C.	5 - 3	Digenis Akritas Morphou (C)
(B) Orfeas Nicosia	2 - 1	Ethnikos Achna FC (A)
(A) Pezoporikos Larnaca	2 - 0	Elpida Xylofagou (C)
(A) Nea Salamis Famagusta FC	2 - 3	APOEL FC (A)
(B) Digenis Akritas Ipsona	0 - 7	AEL Limassol (A)
(B) Chalkanoras Idaliou	0 - 3	Aris Limassol F.C. (A)

== Second round ==
Team 1	Result	Team 2
(A) Alki Larnaca F.C.	0 - 2	AC Omonia (A)
(A) APOEL FC	1 -1, 2 - 0	AEL Limassol (A)
(A) Ermis Aradippou	5 - 2	Othellos Athienou F.C. (C)
(B) Evagoras Paphos	2 - 1	Apollon Lympion (B)
(B) Keravnos Strovolou FC	0 - 6	Aris Limassol F.C. (A)
(B) PAEEK FC	0 - 3	Orfeas Nicosia (B)
(A) Enosis Neon Paralimni FC	2 - 0	ENTHOI Lakatamia FC (B)
(A) Pezoporikos Larnaca	1 - 0	Apollon Limassol (A)

== Quarter-finals ==
Team 1	Result	Team 2
(A) APOEL FC	1 - 0	Enosis Neon Paralimni FC (A)
(A) AC Omonia	1 - 2	Aris Limassol F.C. (A)
(B) Orfeas Nicosia	1 - 0	Evagoras Paphos (B)
(A) Pezoporikos Larnaca	2 - 0	Ermis Aradippou (A)

== Semi-finals ==
Team 1	Result	Team 2
(A) APOEL FC	3 - 0	Orfeas Nicosia (B)
(A) Aris Limassol F.C.	0 - 0, 0 - 3	Pezoporikos Larnaca (A)

== Final ==
9 June 1984

APOEL	3–1 (a.e.t.)	Pezoporikos
Moores 80'; Pantziaras 98'; Maragkos 110'		90' Vernon

Tsirion Stadium, Limassol

Cypriot Cup 1983–84 Winners
APOEL
12th title

== Sources ==
- "1983/84 Cyprus Cup". Rec.Sport.Soccer Statistics Foundation. 2016-01-14.

== See also ==
- Cypriot Cup
- 1983–84 Cypriot First Division
