= 1979–80 Cypriot Third Division =

Cypriot Third Division
- Season: 1979–80
- Champions: Iraklis Gerolakkou (2nd title)
- Promoted: Iraklis Gerolakkou

The 1979–80 Cypriot Third Division was the ninth season of the Cypriot third-level football league. Iraklis Gerolakkou won their 2nd title.

== Format ==
Twelve teams participated in the 1979–80 Cypriot Third Division. All teams played against each other twice, once at their home and once away. The team with the most points at the end of the season crowned champions. The first team was promoted to 1980–81 Cypriot Second Division.

=== Point system ===
Teams received two points for a win, one point for a draw and zero points for a loss.

== League standings ==
Pos	Team	Pld	W	D	L	GF	GA	GD	Pts	Promotion
1	Iraklis Gerolakkou	22	–	–	–	64	19	+45	37	Promoted to 1980–81 Cypriot Second Division
2	ENTHOI Lakatamia FC	22	–	–	–	61	13	+48	36	
3	Kentro Neotitas Maroniton	22	–	–	–	57	23	+34	30	
4	AEK Kythreas	22	–	–	–	40	34	+6	29	
5	Anagennisi Deryneia FC	22	–	–	–	39	30	+9	27	
6	Digenis Akritas Ipsona	22	–	–	–	31	24	+7	24	
7	Poseidon Larnacas	22	–	–	–	25	43	−18	19	
8	ENAD Ayiou Dometiou FC	22	–	–	–	28	49	−21	16	
9	AEK Ammochostos	22	–	–	–	26	44	−18	14	
10	Olimpiada Neapolis FC	22	–	–	–	21	45	−24	13	
11	Doxa Katokopias FC	22	–	–	–	23	55	−32	12	
12	Faros Acropoleos	22	–	–	–	16	61	−45	7	

Rules for classification: 1) Points, 2) Goal differences, 3) Goal for

== Sources ==
- "Γ΄ κατηγορία". Haravgi (in Greek). 1980-04-22. p. 6.
- "Το πρωτάθλημα Γ΄ κατηγορίας". Tharros (in Greek). 1980-04-21. p. 5.

== See also ==
- Cypriot Third Division
- 1979–80 Cypriot First Division
- 1979–80 Cypriot Cup
