= 1973–74 Cypriot Third Division =

Cypriot Third Division
- Season: 1973–74
- Champions: Iraklis Gerolakkou (1st title)
- Promoted: Iraklis Gerolakkou

The 1973–74 Cypriot Third Division was the fourth season of the Cypriot third-level football league. Iraklis Gerolakkou won their 1st title.

== Format ==
Twelve teams participated in the 1973–74 Cypriot Third Division. All teams played against each other twice, once at their home and once away. The team with the most points at the end of the season crowned champions. The first team was promoted to 1974–75 Cypriot Second Division.

=== Point system ===
Teams received two points for a win, one point for a draw and zero points for a loss.

== League standings ==
Pos	Team	Pld	W	D	L	GF	GA	GD	Pts	Promotion
1	Iraklis Gerolakkou	24	18	4	2	54	18	+36	40	Promoted to 1974–75 Cypriot Second Division
2	Ermis Aradippou FC	24	12	8	4	33	20	+13	32	
3	Akritas Chlorakas	24	12	5	7	31	28	+3	29	
4	Doxa Katokopias FC	24	11	6	7	36	25	+11	28	
5	AEK Karava FC	24	9	9	6	42	31	+11	27	
6	ASOB Vatili	24	8	9	7	26	26	0	25	
7	Anagennisi Deryneia FC	24	10	4	10	37	27	+10	24	
8	Faros Acropoleos	24	9	6	9	33	38	−5	24	
9	Achilleas Kaimakli FC	24	7	8	9	25	28	−3	22	
10	AEK Ammochostos	24	6	7	11	25	34	−9	19	
11	AEK Kythreas	24	5	9	10	17	24	−7	19	
12	LALL Lysi	24	4	10	10	17	36	−19	18	

Rules for classification: 1) Points, 2) Goal differences, 3) Goal for

== Sources ==
- ""Χάθηκαν" 17 ομάδες…" (in Greek). 2011-07-24.
- "Το πρωτάθλημα Γ΄ κατηγορίας". Athlitiki (in Greek). 1974-05-13. p. 8.
- "Έκλεισε η αυλαία και της Γ΄ κατηγορίας". Haravgi (in Greek). 1974-05-14. p. 4.

== See also ==
- Cypriot Third Division
- 1973–74 Cypriot First Division
- 1973–74 Cypriot Cup
