= Stylianou =

Stylianou is a surname. Notable people with the surname include:

- Andreas Stylianou (born 1942), Cypriot footballer
- Anna Stylianou (born 1986), Cypriot swimmer
- Demetris Stylianou (born 1984), Cypriot footballer, twin brother of Loukas
- Loukas Stylianou (born 1984), Cypriot footballer
- Marios Stylianou (born 1993), Cypriot footballer
- Nikandros Stylianou (born 1989), Cypriot pole vaulter
- Nikolaos Stylianou (born 1988), Cypriot basketball player
