= 1979–80 Cypriot Cup =

Tournament details
- Country: Cyprus
- Dates: 10 November 1979 – 29 June 1980
- Teams: 41

Final positions
- Champions: Omonia (4th title)
- Runners-up: Alki Larnaca

The 1979–80 Cypriot Cup was the 38th edition of the Cypriot Cup. A total of 41 clubs entered the competition. It began on 10 November 1979 with the preliminary round and concluded on 29 June 1980 with the replay final which was held at Makario Stadium. Omonia won their 4th Cypriot Cup trophy after beating Alki Larnaca 3–1 in the final.

== Format ==
In the 1979–80 Cypriot Cup, participated all the teams of the Cypriot First Division, the Cypriot Second Division and the Cypriot Third Division.

The competition consisted of six knock-out rounds. In all rounds each tie was played as a single leg and was held at the home ground of one of the two teams, according to the draw results. Each tie winner was qualifying to the next round. If a match was drawn, extra time was following. If extra time was drawn, there was a replay at the ground of the team who were away for the first game. If the rematch was also drawn, then extra time was following and if the match remained drawn after extra time the winner was decided by penalty shoot-out.

The cup winner secured a place in the 1980–81 European Cup Winners' Cup.

== Preliminary round ==
In the first preliminary draw, participated all the 12 teams of the Cypriot Third Division and 6 of the 14 teams of the Cypriot Second Division (last six of the league table of each group at the day of the draw).

Team 1	Result	Team 2
(B) Akritas Chlorakas	3 - 2	Olimpiada Neapolis (C)
(C) Doxa Katokopias	2 - 3	Neos Aionas Trikomou (B)
(C) ENAD Ayiou Dometiou	1 - 1, 0 - 1	Adonis Idaliou (B)
(C) Iraklis Gerolakkou	2 - 2, 0 - 2	ASIL Lysi (B)
(C) Enosis Neon THOI Lakatamia	2 - 0	Faros Acropoleos (C)
(C) Poseidon Larnacas	1 - 5	Kentro Neotitas Maroniton (C)
(C) AEK Kythreas	1 - 2	Anagennisi Deryneia (C)
(C) Digenis Akritas Ipsona	1 - 0	AEK Ammochostos (C)
(B) Chalkanoras Idaliou	1 - 2	Ermis Aradippou (B)

== First round ==
15 clubs from the Cypriot First Division and the rest clubs from the Cypriot Second Division met the winners of the preliminary round ties:

Team 1	Result	Team 2
(B) Adonis Idaliou	3 - 0	Anagennisi Deryneia (C)
(A) AEL Limassol	7 - 1	Akritas Chlorakas (B)
(A) APOEL	4 - 2	Othellos Athienou (B)
(A) Aris Limassol	4 - 0	Digenis Akritas Morphou (B)
(B) ASIL Lysi	0 - 2	Nea Salamis Famagusta (B)
(B) Ethnikos Achna	1 - 1, 2 - 4	Alki Larnaca (A)
(B) Ermis Aradippou	0 - 0, 0 - 5	EPA Larnaca (A)
(A) Evagoras Paphos	1 - 0	Olympiakos Nicosia (A)
(C) Enosis Neon THOI Lakatamia	1 - 3	AEM Morphou (B)
(C) Kentro Neotitas Maroniton	1 - 0	APOP Paphos (A)
(A) AC Omonia	4 - 0	Omonia Aradippou (A)
(B) Orfeas Nicosia	1 - 3	Apollon Limassol (A)
(B) PAEEK	1 - 3	Anorthosis Famagusta (A)
(A) Enosis Neon Paralimni	5 - 0	Neos Aionas Trikomou (B)
(A) Pezoporikos Larnaca	6 - 0	Ethnikos Assia (B)
(C) Digenis Akritas Ipsona	1 - 2	Keravnos Strovolou (A)

== Second round ==
Team 1	Result	Team 2
(B) Adonis Idaliou	3 - 9	AC Omonia (A)
(A) AEL Limassol	1 - 0	Nea Salamis Famagusta (B)
(B) AEM Morphou	1 - 5	APOEL (A)
(A) Alki Larnaca	1 - 0	Enosis Neon Paralimni (A)
(A) Apollon Limassol	2 - 0	Pezoporikos Larnaca (A)
(A) Evagoras Paphos	2 - 1	Aris Limassol (A)
(A) Keravnos Strovolou	3 - 2	EPA Larnaca (A)
(C) Kentro Neotitas Maroniton	0 - 2	Anorthosis Famagusta (A)

== Quarter-finals ==
Team 1	Result	Team 2
(A) Alki Larnaca	1 - 0	Keravnos Strovolou (A)
(A) Anorthosis Famagusta	2 - 3	AEL Limassol (A)
(A) Apollon Limassol	3 - 0	APOEL (A)
(A) AC Omonia	3 - 0	Evagoras Paphos (A)

== Semi-finals ==
Team 1	Result	Team 2
(A) Apollon Limassol	0 - 2	Alki Larnaca (A)
(A) AC Omonia	0 - 0, 1 - 0	AEL Limassol (A)

== Final ==
29 June 1980

Omonia	3–1	Alki Larnaca
Kaiafas 43'; Mavris 55'; Kaiafas 76'		89' M. Panayiotou

Makario Stadium, Nicosia

Cypriot Cup 1979–80 Winners
Omonia
4th title

== Sources ==
- "1979/80 Cyprus Cup". Rec.Sport.Soccer Statistics Foundation. 2017-08-08.

== See also ==
- Cypriot Cup
- 1979–80 Cypriot First Division
