= 1980–81 Cypriot Cup =

Tournament details
- Country: Cyprus
- Dates: 20 December 1980 – 27 June 1981
- Teams: 41

Final positions
- Champions: Omonia (5th title)
- Runners-up: Enosis

The 1980–81 Cypriot Cup was the 39th edition of the Cypriot Cup. A total of 41 clubs entered the competition. It began on 20 December 1980 with the preliminary round and concluded on 27 June 1981 with the replay final which was held at Tsirion Stadium. Omonia won their 5th Cypriot Cup trophy after beating Enosis Neon Paralimni 3–0 in the final.

== Format ==
In the 1980–81 Cypriot Cup, participated all the teams of the Cypriot First Division, the Cypriot Second Division and the Cypriot Third Division.

The competition consisted of six knock-out rounds. In all rounds each tie was played as a single leg and was held at the home ground of one of the two teams, according to the draw results. Each tie winner was qualifying to the next round. If a match was drawn, extra time was following. If extra time was drawn, there was a replay at the ground of the team who were away for the first game. If the rematch was also drawn, then extra time was following and if the match remained drawn after extra time the winner was decided by penalty shoot-out.

The cup winner secured a place in the 1981–82 European Cup Winners' Cup.

== Preliminary round ==
In the first preliminary draw, participated all the 13 teams of the Cypriot Third Division and 5 of the 14 teams of the Cypriot Second Division (last five of the league table of each group at the day of the draw).

Team 1	Result	Team 2
(B) Adonis Idaliou	3 - 2	Neos Aionas Trikomou (B)
(C) Ethnikos Assia F.C.	0 - 1	Anagennisi Deryneia (C)
(B) Iraklis Gerolakkou	2 - 1	ENAD (C)
(C) Kentro Neotitas Maroniton	0 - 2	Digenis Akritas Ipsona (C)
(C) AEK Kythreas	2 - 1 (aet)	Olimpiada Neapolis FC (C)
(B) Othellos Athienou F.C.	0 - 1	ASIL Lysi (C)
(B) PAEEK FC	2 - 2 (aet), 2 - 0	Doxa Katokopias F.C. (C)
(C) Poseidon Larnaca	2 - 3	Apollon Lympion (C)
(C) Faros Acropoleos	1 - 1, 0 - 1	ENTHOI Lakatamia FC (C)

== First round ==
14 clubs from the Cypriot First Division and the rest clubs from the Cypriot Second Division met the winners of the preliminary round ties:

Team 1	Result	Team 2
(A) AEL Limassol	6 - 0	ASIL Lysi (C)
(B) AEM Morphou	0 - 2	APOP Paphos (B)
(A) Alki Larnaca F.C.	3 - 1	Omonia Aradippou (A)
(A) APOEL FC	1 - 2	AC Omonia (A)
(A) Apollon Limassol	3 - 2	Ethnikos Achna FC (B)
(A) Aris Limassol F.C.	4 - 0	PAEEK FC (B)
(C) Anagennisi Deryneia	2 - 1	Iraklis Gerolakkou (B)
(A) EPA Larnaca FC	0 - 0, 5 - 0	Adonis Idaliou (B)
(B) Evagoras Paphos	1 - 0	Keravnos Strovolou FC (A)
(C) ENTHOI Lakatamia FC	1 - 2 (aet)	Chalkanoras Idaliou (B)
(C) AEK Kythreas	1 - 4	Pezoporikos Larnaca (A)
(A) Olympiakos Nicosia	1 - 2	Anorthosis Famagusta FC (A)
(B) Orfeas Nicosia	1 - 0	Akritas Chlorakas (B)
(A) Enosis Neon Paralimni FC	3 - 1	Ermis Aradippou (B)
(A) Nea Salamis Famagusta FC	4 - 0	Apollon Lympion (C)
(C) Digenis Akritas Ipsona	3 - 2	Digenis Akritas Morphou (B)

== Second round ==
Team 1	Result	Team 2
(A) AEL Limassol	1 - 2	Chalkanoras Idaliou (B)
(A) Alki Larnaca F.C.	0 - 1	EPA Larnaca FC (A)
(A) Anorthosis Famagusta FC	1 - 4	Pezoporikos Larnaca (A)
(A) Apollon Limassol	2 - 1	Evagoras Paphos (B)
(A) AC Omonia	7 - 1	Anagennisi Deryneia (C)
(B) Orfeas Nicosia	2 - 5	Nea Salamis Famagusta FC (A)
(A) Enosis Neon Paralimni FC	1 - 0	APOP Paphos (B)
(C) Digenis Akritas Ipsona	2 - 6	Aris Limassol F.C. (A)

== Quarter-finals ==
Team 1	Result	Team 2
(A) EPA Larnaca FC	0 - 2	Apollon Limassol (A)
(A) AC Omonia	4 - 0	Aris Limassol F.C. (A)
(A) Nea Salamis Famagusta FC	0 - 1	Enosis Neon Paralimni FC (A)
(B) Chalkanoras Idaliou	1 - 5	Pezoporikos Larnaca (A)

== Semi-finals ==
Team 1	Result	Team 2
(A) AC Omonia	1 - 0 (aet)	Pezoporikos Larnaca (A)
(A) Enosis Neon Paralimni FC	1 - 1, 1 - 0	Apollon Limassol (A)

== Final ==
20 June 1981

Omonia	1–1 (a.e.t.)	Enosis Neon Paralimni
Kaiafas 97'		119' Tsierkezos

Tsirion Stadium, Limassol

Because the match ended in a draw after the extra time, a replay match was played.

27 June 1981

Omonia	3–0	Enosis Neon Paralimni
Kanaris 15'; Mavris 55'; Kaiafas 74'

Tsirion Stadium, Limassol

Cypriot Cup 1980–81 Winners
Omonia
5th title

== Sources ==
- "1980/81 Cyprus Cup". Rec.Sport.Soccer Statistics Foundation. 2016-01-14.

== See also ==
- Cypriot Cup
- 1980–81 Cypriot First Division
