= 1984–85 Irish League =

Irish League
- Season: 1984–85
- Champions: Linfield; 37th Irish title
- Matches played: 182
- Goals scored: 556 (3.05 per match)
- Top goalscorer: Martin McGaughey (34 goals)

Location of teams in the Irish League from 1983–1990
Location of Belfast-based teams in the Irish League from 1983–1990

The 1984–85 Irish League was the 84th edition of the Irish League, the highest level of league competition in Northern Irish football. The league consisted of 14 teams, and Linfield won the championship.

== League standings ==
Pos	Team	Pld	W	D	L	GF	GA	GD	Pts	Qualification
1	Linfield (C)	26	17	5	4	70	22	+48	39	Qualification for the European Cup first round
2	Coleraine	26	14	8	4	56	31	+25	36	Qualification for the UEFA Cup first round
3	Glentoran	26	14	6	6	53	26	+27	34	Qualification for the European Cup Winners' Cup first round
4	Portadown	26	13	4	9	33	29	+4	30	
5	Cliftonville	26	10	8	8	37	36	+1	28	
6	Crusaders	26	9	10	7	34	37	−3	28	
7	Glenavon	26	11	4	11	45	53	−8	26	
8	Ballymena United	26	9	7	10	37	36	+1	25	
9	Distillery	26	8	8	10	35	41	−6	24	
10	Larne	26	10	2	14	37	47	−10	22	
11	Ards	26	8	5	13	32	40	−8	21	
12	Newry Town	26	7	6	13	39	57	−18	20	
13	Bangor	26	5	9	12	24	39	−15	19	
14	Carrick Rangers	26	3	6	17	24	62	−38	12	

Source: rsssf.com
(C) Champions

== Results ==
Home \ Away	ARD	BAN	BLM	CRK	CLI	COL	CRU	DIS	GLV	GLT	LRN	LIN	NEW	POR
Ards		1–0	1–2	4–0	0–1	1–2	1–1	0–0	1–3	3–1	2–1	0–0	1–0	4–1
Bangor	1–3		1–0	2–0	0–3	2–6	1–1	0–0	1–3	0–1	0–2	2–2	2–2	1–1
Ballymena United	1–3	1–3		1–1	2–0	2–2	0–0	3–0	3–1	1–3	3–2	0–3	2–2	2–0
Carrick Rangers	3–2	1–1	2–2		1–2	0–2	2–2	1–3	1–3	0–2	2–0	1–4	0–2	2–1
Cliftonville	1–0	0–1	0–2	3–3		2–2	0–0	1–2	2–1	1–1	1–3	0–4	1–1	2–3
Coleraine	1–1	2–0	3–0	3–1	1–2		3–0	3–2	1–3	2–2	3–1	0–1	1–1	2–1
Crusaders	3–1	1–1	0–3	0–0	3–2	0–6		1–0	3–1	1–1	1–4	0–0	1–2	5–0
Distillery	2–1	0–2	2–1	3–1	0–0	2–2	3–2		3–2	0–2	1–1	1–1	7–2	1–3
Glenavon	1–1	2–1	2–2	4–0	1–1	1–2	1–1	3–1		0–4	1–0	0–7	0–3	1–2
Glentoran	2–0	1–1	1–0	3–0	2–3	2–1	1–3	0–0	5–0		6–0	2–3	3–0	1–1
Larne	3–0	2–0	0–3	2–1	1–4	0–1	1–2	0–0	5–2	1–2		1–4	2–1	1–0
Linfield	5–0	2–0	0–0	6–1	1–3	1–2	0–2	5–1	3–4	3–1	3–1		2–0	1–0
Newry Town	4–1	1–1	3–1	3–0	1–2	3–3	0–1	3–1	0–4	1–4	2–3	0–6		1–2
Portadown	1–0	1–0	1–0	2–0	0–0	0–0	3–0	1–0	0–1	1–0	2–0	0–3	6–1	

Source: Irish League Archive
Legend: Blue = home team win; Yellow = draw; Red = away team win.
