= Yuri Zheludkov =

Russian footballer and coach

Yuri Zheludkov Юрий Желудков
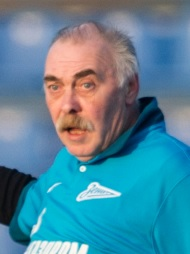

Personal information
- Full name: Yuri Vladimirovich Zheludkov
- Date of birth: 8 March 1959 (age 67)
- Place of birth: Petrodvorets, Leningrad, Russian SFSR
- Height: 1.80 m (5 ft 11 in)
- Positions: Midfielder; forward

Senior career*
Years	Team	Apps	(Gls)
1976–1979	FC Dynamo Leningrad	65	(16)
1980–1989	FC Zenit Leningrad	202	(69)
1990	IFK Östersund		
1991	FC Zenit St. Petersburg	25	(8)
1991–1992	Maccabi Netanya F.C.	10	(2)
1993–1995	KaIK	?	(31)

International career
1983	Soviet Union Olympic	1	(0)

Managerial career
- 2006–2008: FC Dynamo St. Petersburg (assistant)
- * Club domestic league appearances and goals

Yuri Vladimirovich Zheludkov (Russian: Юрий Владимирович Желудков; born 8 March 1959 in Peterhof) is a Russian professional football coach and a former player.

== Honours ==
- Soviet Top League champion: 1984.
- Soviet Top League bronze: 1980.
- USSR Federation Cup finalist: 1986.

== European club competitions ==
With FC Zenit Leningrad.

- UEFA Cup 1987–88: 2 games, 1 goal.
- UEFA Cup 1989–90: 4 games.
