= 1982–83 Cypriot Third Division =

Cypriot Third Division
- Season: 1982–83
- Champions: ENTHOI Lakatamia FC (1st title)
- Promoted: ENTHOI Lakatamia FC; Doxa Katokopias FC
- Relegated: ENAD Ayiou Dometiou FC; Olimpiada Neapolis FC

The 1982–83 Cypriot Third Division was the 12th season of the Cypriot third-level football league. ENTHOI Lakatamia FC won their 1st title.

== Format ==
Fourteen teams participated in the 1982–83 Cypriot Third Division. All teams played against each other twice, once at their home and once away. The team with the most points at the end of the season crowned champions. The first two teams were promoted to 1983–84 Cypriot Second Division. The last two teams were relegated to regional leagues.

=== Point system ===
Teams received two points for a win, one point for a draw and zero points for a loss.

== League standings ==
Pos	Team	Pld	W	D	L	GF	GA	GD	Pts	Promotion or relegation
1	ENTHOI Lakatamia FC	26	–	–	–	34	12	+22	38	Promoted to 1983–84 Cypriot Second Division
2	Doxa Katokopias FC	26	–	–	–	42	18	+24	35	Promoted to 1983–84 Cypriot Second Division
3	Akritas Chlorakas	26	–	–	–	43	31	+12	33	
4	Digenis Akritas Morphou FC	26	–	–	–	40	29	+11	32	
5	ASO Ormideia	26	–	–	–	33	25	+8	30	
6	Orfeas Athienou	26	–	–	–	45	27	+18	29	
7	Neos Aionas Trikomou	26	–	–	–	20	21	−1	27	
8	Ethnikos Assia FC	26	–	–	–	32	32	0	26	
9	APEP FC	26	–	–	–	29	29	0	24	
10	AEK Kythreas	26	–	–	–	28	33	−5	24	
11	Iraklis Gerolakkou	26	–	–	–	25	31	−6	23	
12	ASIL Lysi	26	–	–	–	27	34	−7	21	
13	ENAD Ayiou Dometiou FC	26	–	–	–	24	28	−4	11	Relegated to regional leagues
14	Olimpiada Neapolis FC	26	–	–	–	12	77	−65	4	Relegated to regional leagues

Rules for classification: 1) Points, 2) Goal differences, 3) Goal for

== Sources ==
- "Βαθμολογία Γ΄ κατηγορίας". Phileleftheros (in Greek). 1983-05-04. p. 6.
- "Η ΕΝΑΔ διεγράφη". Simerini (in Greek). 1983-05-04. p. 11.

== See also ==
- Cypriot Third Division
- 1982–83 Cypriot First Division
- 1982–83 Cypriot Cup
