= 1981–82 Cypriot Cup =

Tournament details
- Country: Cyprus
- Dates: 31 March 1982 – 5 June 1982
- Teams: 42

Final positions
- Champions: Omonia (6th title)
- Runners-up: Apollon

The 1981–82 Cypriot Cup was the 40th edition of the Cypriot Cup. A total of 42 clubs entered the competition. It began on 31 March 1982 with the preliminary round and concluded on 5 June 1982 with the replay final which was held at Makario Stadium. Omonia won their 6th Cypriot Cup trophy after beating Apollon 4–1 in the final.

== Format ==
In the 1981–82 Cypriot Cup, participated all the teams of the Cypriot First Division, the Cypriot Second Division and the Cypriot Third Division.

The competition consisted of six knock-out rounds. In all rounds each tie was played as a single leg and was held at the home ground of one of the two teams, according to the draw results. Each tie winner was qualifying to the next round. If a match was drawn, extra time was following. If extra time was drawn, there was a replay at the ground of the team who were away for the first game. If the rematch was also drawn, then extra time was following and if the match remained drawn after extra time the winner was decided by penalty shoot-out.

The cup winner secured a place in the 1982–83 European Cup Winners' Cup.

== Preliminary round ==
In the first preliminary draw, participated all the 14 teams of the Cypriot Third Division and 6 of the 14 teams of the Cypriot Second Division (last six of the league table of each group at the day of the draw).

Team 1	Result	Team 2
(B) Adonis Idaliou	2 - 0	Olimpiada Neapolis FC (C)
(B) AEM Morphou	4 - 0	Doxa Katokopias F.C. (C)
(C) ASIL Lysi	0 - 2	Neos Aionas Trikomou (C)
(C) Anagennisi Deryneia	5 - 0	ENTHOI Lakatamia FC (C)
(B) Digenis Akritas Morphou	4 - 0	AEK Kythreas (C)
(C) Libanos Kormakiti	0 - 5	Ethnikos Assia F.C. (C)
(C) Orfeas Athienou	3 - 1	Digenis Akritas Ipsona (C)
(B) PAEEK FC	4 - 1	Iraklis Gerolakkou (C)
(C) Poseidon Larnaca	1 - 5	Akritas Chlorakas (B)
(B) Chalkanoras Idaliou	2 - 1	ENAD (C)

== First round ==
14 clubs from the Cypriot First Division and the rest clubs from the Cypriot Second Division met the winners of the preliminary round ties:

Team 1	Result	Team 2
(B) Adonis Idaliou	0 - 2	Orfeas Nicosia (B)
(A) APOEL FC	2 - 1	EPA Larnaca FC (A)
(B) Aris Limassol F.C.	6 - 1	AEM Morphou (B)
(C) Anagennisi Deryneia	1 - 0	Omonia Aradippou (A)
(B) Digenis Akritas Morphou	1 - 0	Ethnikos Achna FC (B)
(B) Ermis Aradippou	0 - 2	APOP Paphos (A)
(A) Keravnos Strovolou FC	1 - 2	Apollon Limassol (A)
(B) Kentro Neotitas Maroniton	0 - 3	AEL Limassol (A)
(B) Othellos Athienou F.C.	1 - 2	Akritas Chlorakas (B)
(A) Olympiakos Nicosia	2 - 1	Neos Aionas Trikomou (C)
(C) Orfeas Athienou	0 - 8	AC Omonia (A)
(B) PAEEK FC	0 - 1	Evagoras Paphos (A)
(A) Enosis Neon Paralimni FC	2 - 1	Anorthosis Famagusta FC (A)
(A) Pezoporikos Larnaca	1 - 0	Alki Larnaca F.C. (B)
(A) Nea Salamis Famagusta FC	8 - 0	Ethnikos Assia F.C. (C)
(B) Chalkanoras Idaliou	0 - 1	Apollon Lympion (B)

== Second round ==
Team 1	Result	Team 2
(A) AEL Limassol	4 - 0	Apollon Lympion (B)
(B) Akritas Chlorakas	1 - 7	Pezoporikos Larnaca (A)
(A) APOEL FC	0 - 0, 2 - 0	Olympiakos Nicosia (A)
(A) APOP Paphos	4 - 1	Orfeas Nicosia (B)
(C) Anagennisi Deryneia	0 - 2	AC Omonia (A)
(B) Digenis Akritas Morphou	2 - 5	Aris Limassol F.C. (B)
(A) Evagoras Paphos	1 - 5	Apollon Limassol (A)
(A) Enosis Neon Paralimni FC	3 - 2	Nea Salamis Famagusta FC (A)

== Quarter-finals ==
Team 1	Result	Team 2
(A) AEL Limassol	1 - 2	Apollon Limassol (A)
(B) Aris Limassol F.C.	0 - 2	APOEL FC (A)
(A) AC Omonia	2 - 0	Enosis Neon Paralimni FC (A)
(A) Pezoporikos Larnaca	0 - 1	APOP Paphos (A)

== Semi-finals ==
Team 1	Result	Team 2
(A) APOP Paphos	0 - 1	Apollon Limassol (A)
(A) AC Omonia	1 - 0	APOEL FC (A)

== Final ==
29 May 1982

Apollon	2–2 (a.e.t.)	Omonia
Vevis 90'; Theofanous 103'		63' Kaiafas; 106' Savva

Tsirion Stadium, Limassol

Because the match ended in a draw after the extra time, a replay match was played.

5 June 1982

Omonia	4–1	Apollon
Savvidis 2', 52'; Patikkis 30'; Kanaris 56'		54' Ioannou

Makario Stadium, Nicosia

Cypriot Cup 1981–82 Winners
Omonia
6th title

== Sources ==
- "1981/82 Cyprus Cup". Rec.Sport.Soccer Statistics Foundation. 2016-01-14.
