= 1979–80 Cypriot First Division =

Cypriot First Division
- Season: 1979–80
- Champions: APOEL (12th title)
- Relegated: Alki; Aris
- European Cup: APOEL (1st round)
- UEFA Cup: Pezoporikos (1st round)
- Cup Winners' Cup: Omonia (1st round; via Cypriot Cup)
- Matches played: 210
- Goals scored: 537 (2.56 per match)
- Top goalscorer: Sotiris Kaiafas (23 goals)

The 1979–80 Cypriot First Division was the 41st season of the Cypriot top-level football league.

== Overview ==
It was contested by 15 teams, and APOEL F.C. won the championship.

== League standings ==
Pos	Team	Pld	W	D	L	GF	GA	GD	Pts	Qualification or relegation
1	APOEL (C)	28	23	2	3	72	19	+53	48	Qualification for European Cup first round
2	AC Omonia	28	21	6	1	66	14	+52	48	Qualification for Cup Winners' Cup first round
3	Pezoporikos Larnaca	28	13	7	8	44	29	+15	33	Qualification for UEFA Cup first round
4	EPA Larnaca FC	28	10	10	8	41	27	+14	30	
5	AEL Limassol	28	14	2	12	41	43	−2	30	
6	Apollon Limassol	28	7	14	7	36	30	+6	28	
7	Anorthosis Famagusta FC	28	9	8	11	31	31	0	26	
8	Aris Limassol F.C.	28	9	8	11	37	40	−3	26	
9	EN Paralimni	28	8	8	12	23	26	−3	24	
10	Olympiakos Nicosia	28	8	8	12	27	48	−21	24	
11	Alki Larnaca FC	28	8	7	13	27	45	−18	23	
12	Keravnos	28	7	7	14	35	50	−15	21	
13	Omonia Aradippou	28	6	9	13	18	35	−17	21	
14	APOP Paphos (R)	28	5	9	14	23	53	−30	19	Relegation to Cypriot Second Division
15	Evagoras Paphos (R)	28	4	11	13	16	47	−31	19	Relegation to Cypriot Second Division

(C) Champions; (R) Relegated

== Results ==
Home \ Away	AEL	ALK	ANR	APN	APL	APP	ARS	ENP	EPA	EVA	KRN	OLY	OMA	OMN	POL
AEL		1–0	1–0	1–6	0–3	6–1	3–1	3–0	0–4	2–1	3–1	2–1	1–0	1–2	2–1
Alki	2–1		0–1	0–1	1–4	2–0	1–1	0–3	0–2	3–0	3–2	2–2	0–0	1–3	0–5
Anorthosis	1–2	0–2		0–1	1–1	2–0	2–0	1–0	0–4	3–0	1–2	4–0	1–1	0–2	1–1
APOEL	1–0	2–0	4–0		2–0	4–1	4–1	4–0	3–2	4–0	3–1	4–1	7–0	1–2	1–3
Apollon	0–2	4–2	2–2	1–1		2–0	0–1	0–1	2–3	1–1	1–1	1–2	1–0	0–0	1–0
APOP	0–0	0–0	0–0	0–2	0–0		1–0	1–0	3–2	3–1	3–3	1–1	0–1	0–1	1–1
Aris	1–1	1–2	1–1	1–3	4–2	3–0		0–0	2–2	0–0	7–1	2–2	3–0	0–4	2–0
ENP	5–1	0–1	0–1	0–1	0–0	3–1	2–0		1–1	2–0	3–0	1–0	0–0	0–0	0–1
EPA	3–0	0–0	1–1	0–2	2–2	4–0	0–1	1–1		4–0	1–1	0–1	1–0	0–0	0–2
Evagoras	1–0	1–1	1–0	1–1	0–0	0–3	0–0	0–0	1–1		1–1	0–0	2–0	0–3	1–0
Keravnos	1–0	1–2	1–2	2–3	2–2	2–1	0–1	2–0	0–1	3–1		0–1	1–0	2–2	2–1
Olympiakos	1–3	0–0	2–1	1–4	0–4	3–1	0–1	0–0	2–1	2–2	3–1		0–0	0–3	0–2
Omonia Ar.	0–2	3–0	1–1	0–1	0–0	1–1	3–2	1–0	0–1	2–1	2–1	0–1		1–1	2–3
Omonia	3–1	5–1	1–0	1–0	1–1	7–1	3–1	4–0	2–0	4–0	1–0	5–0	3–0		3–2
Pezoporikos	3–2	2–1	0–4	0–2	1–1	1–1	3–0	3–0	0–0	4–0	1–1	3–1	0–0	1–0	

Legend: Blue = home team win; Yellow = draw; Red = away team win.

== See also ==
- Cypriot First Division
- 1979–80 Cypriot Cup
- List of top goalscorers in Cypriot First Division by season
- Cypriot football clubs in European competitions

== Sources ==
- "1979/80 Cypriot First Division". Rec.Sport.Soccer Statistics Foundation. 2016-01-14.
