= 1980–81 Cypriot Third Division =

Cypriot Third Division
- Season: 1980–81
- Champions: Kentro Neotitas Maroniton (1st title)
- Promoted: Kentro Neotitas Maroniton; Apollon Lympion
- Relegated: Faros Acropoleos

The 1980–81 Cypriot Third Division was the tenth season of the Cypriot third-level football league. Kentro Neotitas Maroniton won their 1st title.

== Format ==
Thirteen teams participated in the 1980–81 Cypriot Third Division. All teams played against each other twice, once at their home and once away. The team with the most points at the end of the season crowned champions. The first two teams were promoted to 1981–82 Cypriot Second Division. The last team was relegated to regional leagues.

=== Point system ===
Teams received two points for a win, one point for a draw and zero points for a loss.

== League standings ==
Pos	Team	Pld	W	D	L	GF	GA	GD	Pts	Promotion or relegation
1	Kentro Neotitas Maroniton	24	–	–	–	–	–	—	40	Promoted to 1981–82 Cypriot Second Division
2	Apollon Lympion	24	–	–	–	–	–	—	39	Promoted to 1981–82 Cypriot Second Division
3	ENTHOI Lakatamia FC	24	–	–	–	–	–	—	38	
4	Digenis Akritas Ipsona	24	–	–	–	–	–	—	32	
5	Doxa Katokopias FC	24	–	–	–	–	–	—	23	
6	Poseidon Larnacas	24	–	–	–	–	–	—	22	
7	Anagennisi Deryneia FC	24	–	–	–	–	–	—	22	
8	ASIL Lysi	24	–	–	–	–	–	—	21	
9	Ethnikos Assia FC	24	–	–	–	–	–	—	19	
10	Olimpiada Neapolis FC	24	–	–	–	–	–	—	17	
11	ENAD Ayiou Dometiou FC	24	–	–	–	–	–	—	17	
12	AEK Kythreas	24	–	–	–	–	–	—	17	
13	Faros Acropoleos	24	–	–	–	–	–	—	5	Relegated to regional leagues.

Rules for classification: 1) Points, 2) Goal differences, 3) Goal for

== Sources ==
- "Με το σπαθί τους τα Λύμπια στην Β΄". Simerini (in Greek). 1981-04-21. p. 6.

== See also ==
- Cypriot Third Division
- 1980–81 Cypriot First Division
- 1980–81 Cypriot Cup
