= Jari Hudd =

Finnish footballer (born 1965)

Personal information
- Full name: Jari Raimo Mikael Hudd
- Date of birth: 13 April 1965 (age 61)
- Place of birth: Vaasa, Finland
- Height: 1.82 m (6 ft 0 in)
- Position: Midfielder

Senior career*
Years	Team	Apps	(Gls)
1982–1983?	VPS		
1985–1986	Kuusysi		
1987–1989	AIK		
1990–1991	KPV		
1992–1995	MP		
- * Club domestic league appearances and goals

Jari Hudd (born 13 April 1965) is a retired Finnish football defender.
