= 1983–84 Cypriot Third Division =

13th season of Cypriot Third Division

Cypriot Third Division
- Season: 1983–84
- Champions: Adonis Idaliou (2nd title)
- Promoted: Adonis Idaliou; Akritas Chlorakas

The 1983–84 Cypriot Third Division was the 13th season of the Cypriot third-level football league. Adonis Idaliou won their 2nd title.

== Format ==
Thirteen teams participated in the 1983–84 Cypriot Third Division. All teams played against each other twice, once at their home and once away. The team with the most points at the end of the season crowned champions. The first two teams were promoted to 1984–85 Cypriot Second Division.

=== Point system ===
Teams received two points for a win, one point for a draw and zero points for a loss.

== League standings ==
Pos	Team	Pld	W	D	L	GF	GA	GD	Pts	Promotion
1	Adonis Idaliou	24	–	–	–	58	29	+29	37	Promoted to 1984–85 Cypriot Second Division
2	Akritas Chlorakas	24	–	–	–	52	23	+29	35	Promoted to 1984–85 Cypriot Second Division
3	APEP FC	24	–	–	–	45	30	+15	31	
4	Othellos Athienou FC	24	–	–	–	30	18	+12	28	
5	AEK Kythreas	24	–	–	–	20	25	−5	23	
6	Elpida Xylofagou	24	–	–	–	29	32	−3	32	
7	Neos Aionas Trikomou	24	–	–	–	25	30	−5	21	
8	Iraklis Gerolakkou	24	–	–	–	27	41	−14	21	
9	Orfeas Athienou	24	–	–	–	26	29	−3	20	
10	Digenis Akritas Morphou FC	24	–	–	–	21	31	−10	20	
11	ASO Ormideia	24	–	–	–	26	31	−5	19	
12	Ethnikos Assia FC	24	–	–	–	23	31	−8	19	
13	ASIL Lysi	24	–	–	–	11	37	−26	14	

Rules for classification: 1) Points, 2) Goal differences, 3) Goal for

== Sources ==
- "Βαθμολογία Γ΄ κατηγορίας". Phileleftheros (in Greek). 1984-04-26. p. 6.
- "Άδωνις-Ακρίτας στη Β΄ κατηγορία". Simerini (in Greek). 1984-04-26. p. 9.
- "Εθνικός Άσσιας-Οθέλλος 0–0". Simerini (in Greek). 1984-04-30. p. 9.

== See also ==
- Cypriot Third Division
- 1983–84 Cypriot First Division
- 1983–84 Cypriot Cup
