= 1981–82 Cypriot Third Division =

Cypriot Third Division
- Season: 1981–82
- Champions: Digenis Akritas Ipsona (1st title)
- Promoted: Digenis Akritas Ipsona; Anagennisi Deryneia FC
- Relegated: Libanos Kormakiti; Poseidon Larnacas

The 1981–82 Cypriot Third Division was the 11th season of the Cypriot third-level football league. Digenis Akritas Ipsona won their 1st title.

== Format ==
Fourteen teams participated in the 1981–82 Cypriot Third Division. All teams played against each other twice, once at their home and once away. The team with the most points at the end of the season crowned champions. The first two teams were promoted to 1982–83 Cypriot Second Division. The last two teams were relegated to regional leagues.

=== Point system ===
Teams received two points for a win, one point for a draw and zero points for a loss.

== League standings ==
Pos	Team	Pld	W	D	L	GF	GA	GD	Pts	Promotion or relegation
1	Digenis Akritas Ipsona	26	–	–	–	56	24	+32	37	Promoted to 1982–83 Cypriot Second Division
2	Anagennisi Deryneia FC	26	–	–	–	46	20	+26	37	Promoted to 1982–83 Cypriot Second Division
3	Orfeas Athienou	26	–	–	–	43	35	+8	35	
4	Ethnikos Assia FC	26	–	–	–	32	15	+17	35	
5	ENTHOI Lakatamia FC	26	–	–	–	40	25	+15	32	
6	Iraklis Gerolakkou	26	–	–	–	28	17	+11	31	
7	ASIL Lysi	26	–	–	–	25	29	−4	26	
8	Neos Aionas Trikomou	26	–	–	–	30	30	0	25	
9	AEK Kythreas	26	–	–	–	31	42	−11	21	
10	Olimpiada Neapolis FC	26	–	–	–	25	44	−19	20	
11	Doxa Katokopias FC	26	–	–	–	14	30	−16	19	
12	ENAD Ayiou Dometiou FC	26	–	–	–	22	44	−22	17	
13	Libanos Kormakiti	26	–	–	–	27	49	−22	15	Relegated to regional leagues
14	Poseidon Larnacas	26	–	–	–	11	46	−35	14	Relegated to regional leagues

Rules for classification: 1) Points, 2) Goal differences, 3) Goal for

== Sources ==
- "Ύψωνας-Δερύνεια στη Β΄ κατηγορία". Simerini (in Greek). 1982-04-21. p. 10.
- "Βαθμολογία Γ΄ κατηγορίας". Phileleftheros (in Greek). 1982-04-21. p. 6.

== See also ==
- Cypriot Third Division
- 1981–82 Cypriot First Division
- 1981–82 Cypriot Cup
