= 1981–82 Cypriot First Division =

Cypriot First Division
- Season: 1981–82
- Champions: Omonia (11th title)
- Relegated: Keravnos; Evagoras
- European Cup: Omonia (1st round)
- UEFA Cup: Pezoporikos (1st round)
- Cup Winners' Cup: Apollon (1st round; via Cypriot Cup)
- Matches played: 182
- Goals scored: 414 (2.27 per match)
- Top goalscorer: Sotiris Kaiafas (19 goals)

The 1981–82 Cypriot First Division was the 43rd season of the Cypriot top-level football league. Omonia won their 11th title.

== Format ==
Fourteen teams participated in the 1981–82 Cypriot First Division. All teams played against each other twice, once at their home and once away. The team with the most points at the end of the season crowned champions. The last two teams were relegated to the 1982–83 Cypriot Second Division.

The champions ensured their participation in the 1982–83 European Cup and the runners-up in the 1982–83 UEFA Cup.

== Changes from previous season ==
Alki Larnaca and Aris Limassol were relegated from previous season and played in the 1981–82 Cypriot Second Division. They were replaced by the first two teams of the 1980–81 Cypriot Second Division, Evagoras Paphos and APOP Paphos.

== Stadia and locations ==
1981–82 Cypriot First Division

Club	Venue
AEL	Tsirion Stadium
Anorthosis	GSZ Stadium
APOEL	Makario Stadium
Apollon	Tsirion Stadium
APOP	GSK Stadium
Enosis Neon Paralimni	Paralimni Stadium
EPA	GSZ Stadium
Evagoras	GSK Stadium
Keravnos	Keravnos Strovolou Stadium
Nea Salamina	Dasaki Stadium
Olympiakos	GSP Stadium
Omonia Ar.	Aradippou Municipal Stadium
Omonia	Makario Stadium
Pezoporikos	GSZ Stadium

== League standings ==
Pos	Team	Pld	W	D	L	GF	GA	GD	Pts	Qualification or relegation
1	Omonia (C)	26	20	4	2	61	9	+52	44	Qualification for European Cup first round
2	Pezoporikos Larnaca	26	13	8	5	38	17	+21	34	Qualification for UEFA Cup first round
3	APOEL	26	10	14	2	29	14	+15	34	
4	Apollon Limassol	26	13	8	5	34	23	+11	34	Qualification for Cup Winners' Cup first round (Note: Apollon qualified to 1982–83 European Cup Winners' Cup because Cypriot Cup winner, Omonia, already qualified to 1982–83 European Cup.)
5	AEL Limassol	26	9	10	7	29	22	+7	28	
6	Nea Salamis	26	8	9	9	34	30	+4	25	
7	Omonia Aradippou	26	8	9	9	27	33	−6	25	
8	Enosis Neon Paralimni	26	8	7	11	25	32	−7	23	
9	Anorthosis Famagusta	26	8	6	12	23	34	−11	22	
10	Olympiakos Nicosia	26	7	8	11	26	40	−14	22	
11	EPA Larnaca	26	6	10	10	24	41	−17	22	
12	APOP Paphos	26	5	9	12	24	35	−11	19	
13	Keravnos (R)	26	7	5	14	22	37	−15	19	Relegation to Cypriot Second Division
14	Evagoras Paphos (R)	26	2	9	15	18	47	−29	13	Relegation to Cypriot Second Division

Rules for classification: 1) Points, 2) Goal differences, 3) Goal for. Points system: Won=2 points, Drawn=1 point, Lost=0 points.
(C) Champions; (R) Relegated

== Results ==
Home \ Away	AEL	ANR	APN	APL	APP	ENP	EPA	EVA	KRN	NSL	OLY	OMA	OMN	POL
AEL		1–2	2–2	1–1	2–0	3–1	0–0	1–0	3–1	1–1	4–0	2–0	1–0	0–1
Anorthosis	0–1		1–4	1–1	2–1	2–1	0–1	0–0	1–0	0–4	3–1	1–0	0–1	0–3
APOEL	0–0	2–0		0–0	1–1	2–2	4–1	0–0	1–0	1–0	1–2	2–0	0–1	2–0
Apollon	1–1	2–0	0–0		2–1	1–0	1–0	5–1	0–2	2–2	2–1	1–1	0–2	2–1
APOP	1–0	1–1	0–0	0–1		2–0	4–0	4–1	0–1	0–1	2–0	1–1	1–2	0–0
ENP	1–0	0–0	0–1	2–0	3–1		2–3	1–0	1–0	2–0	0–1	5–4	0–0	2–1
EPA	1–0	0–3	1–1	1–2	0–0	1–1		1–1	3–2	1–1	1–2	1–2	0–0	0–1
Evagoras	2–3	0–2	0–1	0–2	1–1	0–0	0–1		2–0	1–1	1–1	1–1	0–1	1–0
Keravnos	2–0	2–1	1–1	1–2	1–1	2–1	0–0	2–1		0–0	1–1	0–1	0–3	0–1
Nea Salamis	0–0	1–1	0–1	1–2	3–1	2–0	1–3	5–1	4–2		2–0	1–3	0–2	0–0
Olympiakos	2–0	0–0	0–0	2–4	1–1	0–0	2–2	4–1	1–0	0–2		2–1	0–4	0–0
Omonia Ar.	0–0	2–0	0–0	0–0	1–0	0–0	2–1	2–2	1–2	1–0	3–2		0–2	0–0
Omonia	0–0	2–1	1–1	1–0	6–0	4–0	8–0	3–0	5–0	5–2	3–1	3–0		2–0
Pezoporikos	3–3	3–1	1–1	1–0	4–0	2–0	1–1	5–1	2–0	0–0	2–0	4–1	2–0	

Legend: Blue = home team win; Yellow = draw; Red = away team win.

== See also ==
- Cypriot First Division
- 1981–82 Cypriot Cup
- List of top goalscorers in Cypriot First Division by season
- Cypriot football clubs in European competitions

== Sources ==
- "1981/82 Cypriot First Division". Rec.Sport.Soccer Statistics Foundation. 2016-01-14.
