= 1980–81 Cypriot First Division =

Cypriot First Division
- Season: 1980–81
- Champions: Omonia (10th title)
- Relegated: Alki; Aris
- European Cup: Omonia (1st round)
- UEFA Cup: APOEL (1st round)
- Cup Winners' Cup: Enosis (1st round; via Cypriot Cup)
- Matches played: 182
- Goals scored: 450 (2.47 per match)
- Top goalscorer: Sotiris Kaiafas (14 goals)

The 1980–81 Cypriot First Division was the 42nd season of the Cypriot top-level football league. Omonia won their 10th title.

== Format ==
Fourteen teams participated in the 1980–81 Cypriot First Division. All teams played against each other twice, once at their home and once away. The team with the most points at the end of the season crowned champions. The last two teams were relegated to the 1981–82 Cypriot Second Division.

The champions ensured their participation in the 1981–82 European Cup and the runners-up in the 1981–82 UEFA Cup.

== Changes from previous season ==
APOP Paphos and Evagoras Paphos were relegated from previous season and played in the 1980–81 Cypriot Second Division. They were replaced by the first team of the 1979–80 Cypriot Second Division, Nea Salamina.

== Stadia and locations ==
1980–81 Cypriot First Division

Club	Venue
AEL	Tsirion Stadium
Alki	GSZ Stadium
Anorthosis	Dasaki Stadium
APOEL	Makario Stadium
Apollon	Tsirion Stadium
Aris	Tsirion Stadium
Enosis Neon Paralimni	Paralimni Municipal Stadium
EPA	GSZ Stadium
Keravnos	Keravnos Strovolou Stadium
Nea Salamina	GSZ Stadium
Olympiakos	GSP Stadium
Omonia Ar.	Aradippou Municipal Stadium
Omonia	Makario Stadium
Pezoporikos	GSZ Stadium

== League standings ==
Pos	Team	Pld	W	D	L	GF	GA	GD	Pts	Qualification or relegation
1	Omonia (C)	26	16	6	4	56	21	+35	38	Qualification for European Cup first round
2	APOEL	26	13	10	3	41	16	+25	36	Qualification for UEFA Cup first round
3	Pezoporikos Larnaca	26	14	6	6	45	33	+12	34	
4	Enosis Neon Paralimni	26	11	10	5	32	21	+11	32	Qualification for Cup Winners' Cup first round (Note: Enosis Neon Paralimni qualified to 1981–82 European Cup Winners' Cup because Cypriot Cup winner, Omonia, already qualified to 1981–82 European Cup.)
5	Anorthosis Famagusta	26	9	9	8	37	34	+3	27	
6	Apollon Limassol	26	10	6	10	32	32	0	26	
7	Nea Salamis	26	8	8	10	29	32	−3	24	
8	Omonia Aradippou	26	7	9	10	30	41	−11	23	
9	Keravnos	26	8	7	11	27	40	−13	23	
10	EPA Larnaca	26	6	9	11	25	27	−2	21	
11	Olympiakos Nicosia	26	7	7	12	23	30	−7	21	
12	AEL Limassol	26	7	7	12	19	31	−12	21	
13	Alki Larnaca (R)	26	7	7	12	25	40	−15	21	Relegation to Cypriot Second Division
14	Aris Limassol (R)	26	7	3	16	29	52	−23	17	Relegation to Cypriot Second Division

Rules for classification: 1) Points, 2) Goal differences, 3) Goal for. Points system: Won=2 points, Drawn=1 point, Lost=0 points.
(C) Champions; (R) Relegated

== Results ==
Home \ Away	AEL	ALK	ANR	APN	APL	ARS	ENP	EPA	KRN	NSL	OLY	OMA	OMN	POL
AEL		0–1	0–0	0–1	1–1	2–1	0–1	1–0	1–0	3–2	0–1	1–0	0–1	0–1
Alki	2–3		2–1	0–0	0–3	2–0	0–1	1–2	1–1	1–2	1–0	3–1	2–1	2–5
Anorthosis	3–0	1–0		1–1	1–0	3–1	2–2	0–1	2–0	3–1	0–3	4–1	1–2	0–2
APOEL	1–1	2–0	2–0		2–0	3–1	0–0	2–0	0–0	1–1	0–0	4–0	1–2	0–2
Apollon	1–0	2–0	5–2	0–3		4–1	0–1	2–1	2–1	1–0	2–1	1–1	0–1	1–1
Aris	1–1	0–1	1–3	1–5	2–1		1–0	1–0	0–1	3–2	1–2	3–1	3–6	1–1
ENP	1–2	1–1	1–1	1–1	0–0	3–0		2–1	5–2	3–1	3–0	1–0	1–1	1–0
EPA	1–1	1–1	0–1	0–2	3–0	2–0	3–0		2–2	0–1	4–2	0–0	0–0	2–2
Keravnos	0–0	1–1	1–1	2–1	1–3	0–1	2–1	2–0		2–0	0–2	1–3	3–2	1–0
Nea Salamis	0–0	2–2	2–1	1–3	0–0	3–2	0–1	0–0	0–0		1–0	1–1	1–2	3–0
Olympiakos	2–0	0–0	1–1	0–0	2–0	0–0	1–1	0–0	1–2	0–2		3–1	1–2	0–1
Omonia Ar.	3–1	1–0	2–2	3–3	1–1	2–3	1–0	1–0	2–1	0–0	3–0		1–1	0–1
Omonia	3–0	3–0	2–2	0–1	4–1	1–0	1–1	0–0	4–0	1–2	2–0	5–0		7–0
Pezoporikos	3–1	6–2	1–1	0–2	2–0	3–1	0–0	3–2	5–1	2–1	3–1	1–1	0–2	

Legend: Blue = home team win; Yellow = draw; Red = away team win.

== See also ==
- Cypriot First Division
- 1980–81 Cypriot Cup
- List of top goalscorers in Cypriot First Division by season
- Cypriot football clubs in European competitions

== Sources ==
- "1980/81 Cypriot First Division". Rec.Sport.Soccer Statistics Foundation. 2016-01-14.
