= AEK Karava FC =

Cypriot football club

AEK Karava FC (Greek: AEK Karava) was a Cypriot association football club founded in Karavas in 1957. They have 2 season in the Cypriot Third Division. After the Turkish invasion of Cyprus in July 1974, AEK Karava merged with PAEK to form PAEEK. AEK Karava FC was part of AEK Karava sports club.

== Sources ==
- "ΑΘΛΗΤΙΚΗ ΕΝΩΣΗ ΚΑΡΑΒΑ "Α.Ε.Κ"". www.karavas.org.cy (in Greek). Archived from the original on 2016-08-05.
