= 1982–83 Cypriot Cup =

Tournament details
- Country: Cyprus
- Dates: 14 November 1982 – 28 May 1983
- Teams: 42

Final positions
- Champions: Omonia (7th title)
- Runners-up: Enosis

The 1982–83 Cypriot Cup was the 41st edition of the Cypriot Cup. A total of 42 clubs entered the competition. It began on 14 November 1982 with the preliminary round and concluded on 28 May 1983 with the final which was held at Tsirion Stadium. Omonia won their 7th Cypriot Cup trophy after beating Enosis Neon Paralimni 2–1 in the final.

== Format ==
In the 1982–83 Cypriot Cup, participated all the teams of the Cypriot First Division, the Cypriot Second Division and the Cypriot Third Division.

The competition consisted of six knock-out rounds. In all rounds each tie was played as a single leg and was held at the home ground of one of the two teams, according to the draw results. Each tie winner was qualifying to the next round. If a match was drawn, extra time was following. If extra time was drawn, there was a replay at the ground of the team who were away for the first game. If the rematch was also drawn, then extra time was following and if the match remained drawn after extra time the winner was decided by penalty shoot-out.

The cup winner secured a place in the 1983–84 European Cup Winners' Cup.

== Preliminary round ==
In the first preliminary draw, participated all the 14 teams of the Cypriot Third Division and 6 of the 14 teams of the Cypriot Second Division (last six of the league table of each group at the day of the draw).

Team 1	Result	Team 2
(C) Akritas Chlorakas	1 - 1, 0 - 3	Adonis Idaliou (B)
(C) ASO Ormideia	0 - 3	Ethnikos Assia F.C. (C)
(C) Doxa Katokopias F.C.	3 - 0	Digenis Akritas Morphou (C)
(C) ENAD	3 - 1	Neos Aionas Trikomou (C)
(C) Iraklis Gerolakkou	0 - 0, 1 - 0	ENTHOI Lakatamia FC (C)
(B) Othellos Athienou F.C.	6 - 0	ASIL Lysi (C)
(C) Olimpiada Neapolis FC	2 - 3	Digenis Akritas Ipsona (B)
(C) Orfeas Athienou	0 - 2	Apollon Lympion (B)
(B) PAEEK FC	1 - 2	APEP F.C. (C)
(B) Chalkanoras Idaliou	1 - 2	AEK Kythreas (C)

== First round ==
14 clubs from the Cypriot First Division and the rest clubs from the Cypriot Second Division met the winners of the preliminary round ties:

Team 1	Result	Team 2
(B) Adonis Idaliou	2 - 2, 0 - 4	EPA Larnaca FC (A)
(A) AEL Limassol	2 - 2, 0 - 3	Nea Salamis Famagusta FC (A)
(A) Anorthosis Famagusta FC	3 - 0	Anagennisi Deryneia (B)
(A) APOEL FC	1 - 0	AEM Morphou (B)
(A) Apollon Limassol	4 - 3	Keravnos Strovolou FC (B)
(A) APOP Paphos	5 - 0 (aet)	Doxa Katokopias F.C. (C)
(A) Omonia Aradippou	3 - 0	Ethnikos Assia F.C. (C)
(C) ENAD	1 -1, 0 - 3	APEP F.C. (C)
(B) Evagoras Paphos	2 - 1	Orfeas Nicosia (B)
(B) Kentro Neotitas Maroniton	2 - 0	Ermis Aradippou (B)
(B) Apollon Lympion	2 - 1	Ethnikos Achna FC (B)
(B) Othellos Athienou F.C.	2 - 0	Alki Larnaca F.C. (A)
(A) Olympiakos Nicosia	2 - 1	Aris Limassol F.C. (A)
(A) Enosis Neon Paralimni FC	4 - 0	AEK Kythreas (C)
(A) Pezoporikos Larnaca	8 - 1	Iraklis Gerolakkou (C)
(B) Digenis Akritas Ipsona	0 - 4	AC Omonia (A)

== Second round ==
Team 1	Result	Team 2
(A) Anorthosis Famagusta FC	5 - 3	Omonia Aradippou (A)
(C) APEP F.C.	0 - 8	AC Omonia (A)
(A) APOEL FC	3 - 1	EPA Larnaca FC (A)
(A) APOP Paphos	3 - 2	Olympiakos Nicosia (A)
(B) Evagoras Paphos	1 - 4 (aet)	Apollon Limassol (A)
(A) Enosis Neon Paralimni FC	3 - 2	Apollon Lympion (B)
(A) Pezoporikos Larnaca	3 - 1	Kentro Neotitas Maroniton (B)
(A) Nea Salamis Famagusta FC	2 - 0	Othellos Athienou F.C. (B)

== Quarter-finals ==
Team 1	Result	Team 2
(A) APOEL FC	1 - 1 (aet), 0 - 0 (5 - 2 p.)	Pezoporikos Larnaca (A)
(A) Apollon Limassol	1 - 1, 1 - 2	Anorthosis Famagusta FC (A)
(A) AC Omonia	8 - 1	APOP Paphos (A)
(A) Enosis Neon Paralimni FC	4 - 2 (aet)	Nea Salamis Famagusta FC (A)

== Semi-finals ==
Team 1	Result	Team 2
(A) Anorthosis Famagusta FC	0 - 1	AC Omonia (A)
(A) Enosis Neon Paralimni FC	1 - 0	APOEL FC (A)

== Final ==
28 May 1983

Omonia	2–1	Enosis Neon Paralimni
Kanaris 19'; Sergiou 78'		77' Kittos

Tsirion Stadium, Limassol

Cypriot Cup 1982–83 Winners
Omonia
7th title

== Sources ==
- "1982/83 Cyprus Cup". Rec.Sport.Soccer Statistics Foundation. 2016-01-14.

== See also ==
- Cypriot Cup
- 1982–83 Cypriot First Division
