= 1982–83 Cypriot First Division =

Cypriot First Division
- Season: 1982–83
- Champions: Omonia (12th title)
- Relegated: Olympiakos; APOP
- European Cup: Omonia (1st round)
- UEFA Cup: Anorthosis (1st round)
- Cup Winners' Cup: Enosis (1st round; via Cypriot Cup)
- Matches played: 182
- Goals scored: 443 (2.43 per match)
- Top goalscorer: Panikos Hatziloizou (17 goals)

The 1982–83 Cypriot First Division was the 44th season of the Cypriot top-level football league. Omonia won their 12th title.

== Format ==
Fourteen teams participated in the 1982–83 Cypriot First Division. All teams played against each other twice, once at their home and once away. The team with the most points at the end of the season crowned champions. The last two teams were relegated to the 1983–84 Cypriot Second Division.

The champions ensured their participation in the 1983–84 European Cup and the runners-up in the 1983–84 UEFA Cup.

== Changes from previous season ==
Keravnos and Evagoras Paphos were relegated from previous season and played in the 1982–83 Cypriot Second Division. They were replaced by the first two teams of the 1981–82 Cypriot Second Division, Alki Larnaca and Aris Limassol.

== Stadia and locations ==
1982–83 Cypriot First Division

Club	Venue
AEL	Tsirion Stadium
Alki	GSZ Stadium
Anorthosis	Dasaki Stadium
APOEL	Makario Stadium
Apollon	Tsirion Stadium
APOP	GSK Stadium
Aris	Tsirion Stadium
Enosis	Paralimni Stadium
EPA	GSZ Stadium
Nea Salamina	GSZ Stadium
Olympiakos	GSP Stadium
Omonoia Ar.	Aradippou Municipal Stadium
Omonia	Makario Stadium
Pezoporikos	GSZ Stadium

== League standings ==
Pos	Team	Pld	W	D	L	GF	GA	GD	Pts	Qualification or relegation
1	Omonia (C)	26	16	6	4	52	17	+35	38	Qualification for European Cup first round
2	Anorthosis Famagusta	26	12	11	3	46	21	+25	35	Qualification for UEFA Cup first round
3	APOEL	26	11	10	5	33	20	+13	32	
4	AEL Limassol	26	12	7	7	29	22	+7	31	
5	Pezoporikos Larnaca	26	9	10	7	26	19	+7	28	
6	Omonia Aradippou	26	11	6	9	34	34	0	28	
7	Alki Larnaca	26	8	11	7	32	35	−3	27	
8	Aris Limassol	26	10	5	11	42	39	+3	25	
9	Enosis Neon Paralimni	26	5	13	8	35	40	−5	23	Qualification for Cup Winners' Cup first round (Note: Enosis Neon Paralimni qualified to 1983–84 European Cup Winners' Cup because Cypriot Cup winner, Omonia, already qualified to 1983–84 European Cup)
10	EPA Larnaca	26	8	6	12	22	33	−11	22	
11	Apollon Limassol	26	6	9	11	24	38	−14	21	
12	Nea Salamis	26	6	8	12	28	39	−11	20	
13	Olympiakos Nicosia (R)	26	5	10	11	26	45	−19	20	Relegation to Cypriot Second Division
14	APOP Paphos (R)	26	5	4	17	14	41	−27	14	Relegation to Cypriot Second Division

Rules for classification: 1) Points, 2) Goal differences, 3) Goal for. Points system: Won=2 points, Drawn=1 point, Lost=0 points.
(C) Champions; (R) Relegated

== Results ==
Home \ Away	AEL	ALK	ANR	APN	APL	APP	ARS	ENP	EPA	NSL	OLY	OMA	OMN	POL
AEL		2–0	1–0	1–1	3–0	1–1	3–1	1–0	2–0	2–1	2–2	0–0	1–0	1–0
Alki	0–0		0–0	0–0	3–1	1–0	1–0	2–2	2–2	2–0	1–1	1–3	2–2	2–1
Anorthosis	2–1	1–1		1–0	4–0	2–0	3–0	2–2	5–1	3–2	1–2	2–0	0–1	1–1
APOEL	1–0	2–2	0–2		2–1	1–0	1–1	4–2	1–0	0–0	1–0	3–2	0–0	1–2
Apollon	0–3	3–1	1–1	1–2		2–0	3–1	0–0	2–2	0–0	1–1	1–4	1–0	1–1
APOP	1–0	1–0	1–3	0–0	1–0		0–1	1–1	1–0	1–3	0–1	1–3	0–4	0–1
Aris	3–0	3–1	2–5	0–0	0–0	3–2		6–1	1–1	3–1	5–2	3–0	4–3	2–0
ENP	0–0	2–2	1–1	0–4	1–2	4–0	1–0		0–1	0–0	2–2	3–0	1–1	1–1
EPA	1–2	1–2	1–3	2–0	0–0	2–0	1–0	0–1		0–0	2–0	2–0	1–3	1–0
Nea Salamis	3–1	1–2	1–3	1–4	1–0	0–2	3–0	2–5	0–0		1–1	1–1	1–0	1–3
Olympiakos	0–1	1–0	0–0	1–5	0–0	2–0	2–2	3–3	0–1	2–4		0–2	1–7	0–1
Omonia Ar.	2–0	3–3	1–0	0–0	3–2	1–1	3–1	1–1	1–0	1–0	1–2		0–2	2–0
Omonia	1–1	3–0	1–1	1–0	3–0	4–0	1–0	2–0	3–0	3–1	2–0	2–0		2–1
Pezoporikos	2–0	0–0	0–0	0–0	1–2	1–0	1–0	1–1	4–0	0–0	0–0	3–0	1–1	

Legend: Blue = home team win; Yellow = draw; Red = away team win.

== See also ==
- Cypriot First Division
- 1982–83 Cypriot Cup
- List of top goalscorers in Cypriot First Division by season
- Cypriot football clubs in European competitions

== Sources ==
- "1982/83 Cypriot First Division". Rec.Sport.Soccer Statistics Foundation. 2016-01-14.
