= 1983–84 Cypriot First Division =

Cypriot First Division
- Season: 1983–84
- Champions: Omonia (13th title)
- Relegated: Ethnikos; Ermis
- European Cup: Omonia (1st round)
- UEFA Cup: Apollon (1st round)
- Cup Winners' Cup: APOEL (1st round; via Cypriot Cup)
- Matches played: 182
- Goals scored: 458 (2.52 per match)
- Top goalscorer: Lenos Kittos; Sylvester Vernon; (14 goals each)

The 1983–84 Cypriot First Division was the 45th season of the Cypriot top-level football league. Omonia won their 13th title.

== Format ==
Fourteen teams participated in the 1983–84 Cypriot First Division. All teams played against each other twice, once at their home and once away. The team with the most points at the end of the season crowned champions. The last two teams were relegated to the 1984–85 Cypriot Second Division.

The champions ensured their participation in the 1984–85 European Cup and the runners-up in the 1984–85 UEFA Cup.

== Changes from previous season ==
Olympiakos Nicosia and APOP Paphos were relegated from previous season and played in the 1983–84 Cypriot Second Division. They were replaced by the first two teams of the 1982–83 Cypriot Second Division, Ermis Aradippou and Ethnikos Achna FC.

== Stadia and locations ==
1983–84 Cypriot First Division

Club	Venue
AEL	Tsirion Stadium
Alki	GSZ Stadium
Anorthosis	Dasaki Stadium
APOEL	Makario Stadium
Apollon	Tsirion Stadium
Aris	Tsirion Stadium
Ethnikos	Dasaki Stadium
Enosis	Paralimni Stadium
EPA	GSZ Stadium
Ermis	Aradippou Municipal Stadium
Nea Salamina	GSZ Stadium
Omonia Ar.	Aradippou Municipal Stadium
Omonia	Makario Stadium
Pezoporikos	GSZ Stadium

== League standings ==
Pos	Team	Pld	W	D	L	GF	GA	GD	Pts	Qualification or relegation
1	Omonia (C)	26	18	6	2	59	19	+40	42	Qualification for European Cup first round
2	Apollon Limassol	26	14	9	3	50	28	+22	37	Qualification for UEFA Cup first round
3	Pezoporikos Larnaca	26	12	10	4	34	17	+17	34	
4	APOEL	26	12	9	5	42	23	+19	33	Qualification for Cup Winners' Cup first round
5	Anorthosis Famagusta	26	9	11	6	34	29	+5	29	
6	Enosis Neon Paralimni	26	9	9	8	31	28	+3	27	
7	AEL Limassol	26	9	8	9	30	26	+4	26	
8	EPA Larnaca	26	6	13	7	28	31	−3	25	
9	Alki Larnaca	26	6	10	10	26	28	−2	22	
10	Aris Limassol	26	5	12	9	24	35	−11	22	
11	Nea Salamis	26	7	8	11	25	41	−16	22	
12	Omonia Aradippou	26	4	8	14	23	41	−18	16	
13	Ethnikos Achna (R)	26	6	4	16	29	56	−27	16	Relegation to Cypriot Second Division
14	Ermis Aradippou (R)	26	3	7	16	23	56	−33	13	Relegation to Cypriot Second Division

Rules for classification: 1) Points, 2) Goal differences, 3) Goal for. Points system: Won=2 points, Drawn=1 point, Lost=0 points.
(C) Champions; (R) Relegated

== Results ==
Home \ Away	AEL	ALK	ANR	APN	APL	ARS	ETH	ENP	EPA	ERM	NSL	OMA	OMN	POL
AEL		1–1	6–1	3–1	0–3	1–1	2–1	0–1	0–0	3–1	2–0	0–1	2–1	2–1
Alki	2–0		2–4	0–0	0–1	0–0	3–0	1–0	2–0	1–1	1–3	2–0	2–2	0–1
Anorthosis	0–0	1–0		2–1	0–1	1–0	0–2	2–0	1–1	5–0	1–1	2–1	1–1	0–0
APOEL	2–0	0–0	1–0		3–0	1–1	3–1	1–2	2–1	4–0	3–0	3–1	1–1	1–3
Apollon	2–1	3–2	3–3	0–0		2–0	2–0	4–0	2–0	2–0	0–1	2–2	1–1	2–0
Aris	1–1	2–0	0–0	0–1	1–6		3–0	0–0	1–2	4–2	1–2	2–0	0–4	1–0
Ethnikos	0–0	2–1	1–3	2–1	1–3	2–2		1–2	1–0	4–2	1–0	2–2	2–5	0–2
ENP	0–0	0–0	3–0	1–1	2–2	6–1	3–1		1–1	1–0	2–0	1–1	2–1	0–1
EPA	0–0	0–0	1–1	1–1	2–2	0–0	5–2	2–1		1–1	3–2	3–2	0–1	1–1
Ermis	0–1	0–3	0–0	2–3	1–1	1–1	1–0	1–1	0–1		5–1	2–1	1–4	0–2
Nea Salamis	2–1	2–2	0–0	0–4	4–4	0–0	2–0	1–0	1–1	0–0		1–2	0–2	1–5
Omonia Ar.	0–2	2–0	0–4	0–2	1–2	1–1	1–1	1–1	0–0	2–1	0–1		0–2	0–2
Omonia	1–0	1–0	3–1	2–2	3–0	1–0	6–1	4–1	3–1	6–0	1–0	1–0		2–1
Pezoporikos	2–1	1–1	1–1	0–0	0–0	1–1	2–1	1–0	2–0	4–1	0–0	1–1	0–0	

Legend: Blue = home team win; Yellow = draw; Red = away team win.

== See also ==
- Cypriot First Division
- 1983–84 Cypriot Cup
- List of top goalscorers in Cypriot First Division by season
- Cypriot football clubs in European competitions

== Sources ==
- "1983/84 Cypriot First Division". Rec.Sport.Soccer Statistics Foundation. 2016-01-14.
