= 1973–74 Cypriot First Division =

Cypriot First Division
- Season: 1973–74

The 1973–74 Cypriot First Division was the 35th season of the Cypriot top-level football league.

== Overview ==
It was contested by 14 teams, and AC Omonia won the championship. APOEL participated in the Greek championship as the previous year's champions. They finished in 14th position and were not relegated.

== League standings ==
Pos	Team	Pld	W	D	L	GF	GA	GD	Pts	Qualification or relegation
1	AC Omonia (C)	26	20	4	2	69	14	+55	44	Qualification for European Cup first round
2	Pezoporikos Larnaca	26	17	8	1	34	8	+26	42	Qualification for UEFA Cup first round
3	AEL Limassol	26	10	13	3	29	21	+8	33	
4	Apollon Limassol	26	12	5	9	29	30	−1	29	
5	Olympiakos Nicosia	26	9	10	7	31	20	+11	28	
6	EN Paralimni	26	9	9	8	24	20	+4	27	Qualification for Cup Winners' Cup first round
7	Anorthosis Famagusta FC	26	8	9	9	25	24	+1	25	
8	Digenis Akritas Morphou	26	8	9	9	31	34	−3	25	
9	Alki Larnaca FC	26	7	7	12	23	32	−9	21	
10	Aris Limassol F.C.	26	5	9	12	28	45	−17	19	
11	EPA Larnaca FC	26	4	11	11	22	36	−14	19	
12	Evagoras Paphos	26	5	9	12	19	38	−19	19	
13	Nea Salamis FC	26	5	8	13	14	30	−16	18	
14	APOP Paphos (R)	26	3	9	14	22	48	−26	15	Relegation to Cypriot Second Division

(C) Champions; (R) Relegated

== Results ==
Home \ Away	AEL	ALK	ANR	APL	APP	ARS	DGN	ENP	EPA	EVA	NSL	OLY	OMO	POL
AEL		3–0	2–1	1–2	2–0	2–0	1–1	2–1	0–1	3–1	1–1	1–1	1–0	0–0
Alki	1–1		1–1	2–0	2–0	2–0	1–3	0–0	0–1	1–0	1–2	0–1	1–1	0–2
Anorthosis	0–1	1–0		0–1	1–2	5–0	1–1	1–2	1–0	2–0	1–0	1–0	0–2	1–1
Apollon	2–3	1–0	2–0		3–0	2–2	0–0	1–0	1–1	2–0	2–0	1–0	0–3	0–2
APOP	0–0	0–0	0–0	0–1		0–3	0–2	0–1	6–0	1–1	3–0	2–2	1–3	0–1
Aris	0–0	1–2	0–3	3–1	1–1		5–1	0–2	2–2	0–1	1–1	0–2	2–2	0–0
Digenis	1–1	1–2	0–0	0–1	5–1	3–0		0–0	2–1	3–0	3–0	1–1	0–2	1–2
ENP	0–0	3–0	0–0	2–2	2–1	1–0	0–1		1–1	0–0	2–0	1–0	1–2	0–1
EPA	1–2	0–0	1–1	1–0	1–1	2–2	0–0	0–2		4–1	1–2	1–1	1–2	1–2
Evagoras	0–0	2–4	1–2	0–0	2–2	2–2	2–0	3–2	0–0		1–0	0–0	1–0	0–1
Nea Salamis	0–0	1–1	0–0	2–1	2–0	0–1	0–0	0–0	3–0	0–0		0–2	0–4	0–1
Olympiakos	2–2	3–2	2–2	1–2	5–0	0–2	4–0	0–0	0–0	2–0	1–0		0–1	0–0
Omonia	5–0	1–0	4–0	5–1	7–0	7–1	6–1	4–1	2–1	3–0	1–0	1–0		1–1
Pezoporikos	0–0	3–0	1–0	2–0	1–1	1–0	3–1	1–0	2–0	4–1	2–0	0–1	0–0	

Legend: Blue = home team win; Yellow = draw; Red = away team win.
