= Aradippou Municipal Stadium =

Sports venue in Aradippou, Cyprus

Coordinates: 34.9486°N 33.5879°E

Aradippou Stadium
- Interactive map of Aradippou Stadium
- Full name: Aradippou Municipal Stadium
- Location: Aradippou, Cyprus
- Capacity: 2,500

Tenants
- Ermis Aradippou (1990-present); Omonia Aradippou (1990-present)

Aradippou Stadium (Greek: Στάδιο Αραδίππου) is a stadium in Aradippou, Cyprus. It is the home ground of Ermis Aradippou and Omonia Aradippou. The stadium holds 2,500 people and is owned by Aradippou municipality.
