= Kentro Neotitas Maroniton =

Kentro Neotitas Maroniton was a Cypriot football club based in Limassol (1977–1983) and then in Nicosia. The team was playing sometimes in Second and sometimes in the Third and Fourth Division.

== Honours ==
- Cypriot Third Division:
  - Champions (1): 1981
- Cypriot Fourth Division:
  - Champions (1): 1991
