= 2026–27 Cypriot First Division =

- Season: 2026–27
- Dates: 28 August 2026 – 23 May 2027
- Country: Cyprus
- Matches: 7
- Goals: 22 (3.14 per match)
- All statistics correct as of 01 September 2026.

The 2026–27 Cypriot First Division, known as the Cyprus League by Stoiximan for sponsorship reasons, is the 88th season of the Cypriot top-level football league since its establishment. Omonia are the defending champions, having won their 22nd title in the 2025–26 season.

The draw for the first phase was held on 24 July 2026 at the Olympic House in Nicosia. The season begin 28 August 2026, and will conclude on the weekend of 22–23 May 2027.

Fourteen teams compete in the league — the eleven teams remaining from the previous season, and three teams promoted from the 2025–26 Cypriot Second Division.

== Team changes ==
| Promoted from 2025–26 Cypriot Second Division | Relegated from 2025–26 Cypriot First Division |
|---|---|
| Nea Salamina FC | Akritas Chlorakas |
| Karmiotissa | Ethnikos Achna |
| Omonia 29M | Enosis Neon Paralimni |

== Stadia and locations ==
Locations of the 2026–27 Cypriot First Division teams.

| Team | Location | Stadium | Capacity |
|---|---|---|---|
| AEK Larnaca | Larnaca | AEK Arena | 8,058 |
| AEL Limassol | Limassol | Alphamega Stadium | 10,830 |
| Anorthosis Famagusta | Famagusta | Antonis Papadopoulos Stadium | 10,230 |
| APOEL | Nicosia | GSP Stadium | 22,859 |
| Apollon Limassol | Limassol | Alphamega Stadium | 10,830 |
| Aris Limassol | Limassol | Alphamega Stadium | 10,830 |
| Karmiotissa | Limassol (Note: Karmiotissa is based in Pano Polemidia and Krasava in Ypsonas; both are playing at Tsirion Stadium for this season only.) | Tsirion Stadium (Note: If Tsirion Stadium does not obtain the necessary licences before the start of the season, Karmiotissa will play at Ethnikos Achna's stadium and Krasava will play at Ammochostos Epistrofi Stadium instead.) | 13,331 |
| Krasava E.N.Y. | Limassol | Tsirion Stadium | 13,331 |
| Nea Salamina | Famagusta | Ammochostos Epistrofi Stadium | 5,500 |
| Olympiakos Nicosia | Nicosia | GSP Stadium | 22,859 |
| Omonia 29M | Nicosia | Katokopia Stadium | 3,500 |
| Omonia Aradippou | Aradippou | AEK Arena | 8,058 |
| Omonia Nicosia | Nicosia | GSP Stadium | 22,859 |
| Pafos FC | Paphos | Stelios Kyriakides Stadium | 9,394 |

The clubs declared these venues as their home grounds for league matches in the 2026–27 season.

== Regular season ==
=== League table ===
| Pos | Team | Pld | W | D | L | GF | GA | GD | Pts | Qualification or relegation |
|---|---|---|---|---|---|---|---|---|---|---|
| 1 | AEK Larnaca | 10 | 7 | 2 | 1 | 20 | 8 | +12 | 23 | Qualification for the Championship round |
| 2 | Apollon Limassol | 10 | 5 | 4 | 1 | 22 | 11 | +11 | 19 | Qualification for the Championship round |
| 3 | Omonia | 10 | 5 | 4 | 1 | 18 | 7 | +11 | 19 | Qualification for the Championship round |
| 4 | Pafos | 10 | 5 | 4 | 1 | 15 | 8 | +7 | 19 | Qualification for the Championship round |
| 5 | APOEL | 10 | 5 | 3 | 2 | 22 | 12 | +10 | 18 | Qualification for the Championship round |
| 6 | Aris Limassol | 10 | 5 | 3 | 2 | 16 | 14 | +2 | 18 | Qualification for the Championship round |
| 7 | AEL Limassol | 10 | 7 | 0 | 3 | 16 | 15 | +1 | 21 | Qualification for the Relegation round |
| 8 | Omonia 29M | 10 | 3 | 2 | 5 | 15 | 18 | −3 | 11 | Qualification for the Relegation round |
| 9 | Olympiakos Nicosia | 10 | 1 | 6 | 3 | 12 | 14 | −2 | 9 | Qualification for the Relegation round |
| 10 | Nea Salamis Famagusta | 10 | 2 | 2 | 6 | 15 | 21 | −6 | 8 | Qualification for the Relegation round |
| 11 | Anorthosis Famagusta | 9 | 2 | 0 | 7 | 7 | 17 | −10 | 6 | Qualification for the Relegation round |
| 12 | Karmiotissa | 10 | 1 | 3 | 6 | 7 | 22 | −15 | 6 | Qualification for the Relegation round |
| 13 | Omonia Aradippou | 10 | 1 | 3 | 6 | 8 | 15 | −7 | 6 | Qualification for the Relegation round |
| 14 | Krasava | 9 | 1 | 2 | 6 | 9 | 20 | −11 | 5 | Qualification for the Relegation round |

Updated to match(es) played on 22 November 2026. Source: Soccerway
Rules for classification: 1) Points; 2) Head-to-head points; 3) Head-to-head goal difference; 4) Head-to-head goals scored; 5) Head-to-head away goals scored (only if two teams); 6) Goal difference; 7) Goals scored; 8) Play-off (only if deciding championship round, relegation round or relegation).

=== Results ===
| Home \ Away | AEK | AEL | ANO | APO | APL | ARI | KAR | KRA | NEA | OLY | OAR | OMO | PAC | PAF |
|---|---|---|---|---|---|---|---|---|---|---|---|---|---|---|
| AEK Larnaca | — | | | 3–1 | | | 4–1 | | | | 1–0 | 2–0 | | 0–1 |
| AEL Limassol | | — | 2–0 | | | 1–3 | | 3–1 | 2–1 | | | | 2–1 | |
| Anorthosis Famagusta | | | — | 2–1 | | | | | | | 2–0 | 0–2 | | 1–3 |
| APOEL | | 6–0 | | — | | 3–1 | | | 2–1 | | | | 4–1 | |
| Apollon Limassol | | | 3–1 | 2–2 | — | | | | 4–2 | | | | 1–0 | 2–2 |
| Aris Limassol | 1–1 | | 2–1 | | 2–2 | — | 0–0 | | 3–1 | | | 1–4 | | |
| Karmiotissa | | 1–2 | | | 0–5 | | — | | | 1–0 | 1–1 | 0–3 | | 0–3 |
| Krasava | 2–2 | | | | 1–3 | 0–1 | 2–1 | — | | | | | 0–3 | |
| Nea Salamis Famagusta | 1–4 | | 3–0 | | | | | | — | | 3–2 | | | 0–0 |
| Olympiakos Nicosia | 0–1 | | | | 1–0 | 1–2 | | 1–1 | 3–3 | — | | | 3–3 | |
| Omonia Aradippou | | 0–2 | | 1–2 | | | | 2–1 | | 1–1 | — | | | 1–2 |
| Omonia | | 2–0 | | 1–1 | 0–0 | | | 4–1 | | 2–2 | 0–0 | — | | |
| Omonia 29M | 1–2 | | 1–0 | | | | 2–2 | | 1–0 | | | | — | |
| Pafos | | 0–2 | | 0–0 | | | | | | 0–0 | | | 4–2 | — |

Updated to match(es) played on 22 November 2026. Source: Soccerway
Legend: Blue = home team win; Yellow = draw; Red = away team win.

== Season statistics ==
=== Top scorers ===
As of 14 September 2026

| Rank | Player | Club | Goals |
|---|---|---|---|
| 1 | (Guinea-Bissau) Steve Ambri | PAC Omonia | 4 |
| 2 | (Gabon) Rody Junior Effaghe | Aris Limassol | 3 |
| 2 | (France) Samuel Grandsir | Nea Salamis | 3 |
| 2 | (Greece) Panagiotis Kynigopoulos | Olympiakos Nicosia | 3 |
| 5 | (Venezuela) Yerson Chacón | AEK Larnaca | 2 |
| 5 | (France) Loïs Diony | Omonia | 2 |
| 5 | (Serbia) Đorđe Ivanović | AEK Larnaca | 2 |
| 5 | (Portugal) Kiko | Anorthosis | 2 |
| 5 | (Slovenia) Alen Ožbolt | Apollon Limassol | 2 |
| 5 | (Argentina) Fabricio Pedrozo | APOEL | 2 |
| 5 | (Cape Verde) Garry Rodrigues | Apollon Limassol | 2 |

=== Clean sheets ===
| Rank | Player | Club | Clean sheets |
|---|---|---|---|
| 1 | (Poland) Radosław Majecki | Pafos | 3 |
| 2 | (Belgium) Thomas Kaminski | Omonia | 2 |
| 3 | (Slovenia) Vid Belec | APOEL | 1 |
| 3 | (Greece) Nikos Grammatikakis | PAC Omonia | 1 |
| 3 | (Greece) Stefanos Kapino | AEL Limassol | 1 |
| 3 | (Germany) Philipp Kühn | Apollon Limassol | 1 |
| 3 | (Greece) Christos Talichmanidis | Olympiakos Nicosia | 1 |
| 3 | (Croatia) Mislav Zadro | Aris Limassol | 1 |
| 3 | (Serbia) Živko Živković | Omonia Aradippou | 1 |
