= 1992–93 Cypriot Cup =

Tournament details
- Country: Cyprus
- Dates: 28 November 1992 – 19 June 1993
- Teams: 72

Final positions
- Champions: APOEL (13th title)

The 1992–93 Cypriot Cup was the 51st edition of the Cypriot Cup. A total of 72 clubs entered the competition. It began on 28 November 1992 with the first preliminary round and concluded on 19 June 1993 with the final which was held at GSZ Stadium. APOEL won their 13th Cypriot Cup trophy after beating Apollon 4–1 in the final.

== Format ==
In the 1992–93 Cypriot Cup, participated all the teams of the Cypriot First Division, the Cypriot Second Division, the Cypriot Third Division and 30 of the 40 teams of the Cypriot Fourth Division.

The competition consisted of seven knock-out rounds. In the preliminary rounds and in the first round each tie was played as a single leg and was held at the home ground of one of the two teams, according to the draw results. Each tie winner was qualifying to the next round. If a match was drawn, extra time was following. If extra time was drawn, there was a replay at the ground of the team who were away for the first game. If the rematch was also drawn, then extra time was following and if the match remained drawn after extra time the winner was decided by penalty shoot-out.

The next three rounds were played in a two-legged format, each team playing a home and an away match against their opponent. The team which scored more goals on aggregate, was qualifying to the next round. If the two teams scored the same number of goals on aggregate, then the team which scored more goals away from home was advancing to the next round.

If both teams had scored the same number of home and away goals, then extra time was following after the end of the second leg match. If during the extra thirty minutes both teams had managed to score, but they had scored the same number of goals, then the team who scored the away goals was advancing to the next round (i.e. the team which was playing away). If there weren't scored any goals during extra time, the qualifying team was determined by penalty shoot-out.

The cup winner secured a place in the 1993–94 European Cup Winners' Cup.

== First preliminary round ==
All the 14 clubs of the Cypriot Third Division and 30 clubs from the Cypriot Fourth Division (first ten of the league table of each group at the day of draw) participated in the first preliminary round.

Team 1	Score	Team 2
Achyronas Liopetriou (C)	2–1	Ethnikos Defteras (C)
Adonis Idaliou (C)	5–2	Olympias Frenarou (D)
AEK Kakopetrias (C)	2–1	Ellinismos Akakiou (D)
AEK Katholiki (C)	4–3	Ethnikos Latsion (D)
AEK Kythreas (D)	1–0	Ethnikos Empas (D)
Anagennisi Lythrodonta (D)	1–2	Anorthosi Polemidion (D)
ATE PEK Parekklisias (D)	1–2	Poseidonas Giolou (D)
Digenis Akritas Ipsona (C)^{1}		Achilleas Ayiou Theraponta (D)
Digenis Oroklinis (D)	4–3 (a.e.t.)	ATE PEK Ergaton (D)
Elia Lythrodonta (D)	1–2	Elpida Xylofagou (D)
Elpida Liopetriou (D)	1–2	Livadiakos Livadion (C)
Elpida Prosfigon Paphou (D)	1–1^{2}	Fotiakos Frenarou (D)
Enosis Kokkinotrimithia (D)	3–2	Doxa Paliometochou (D)
Iraklis Gerolakkou (D)	5–2	APEY Ypsona (D)
Kimonas Xylotympou (D)	1–2 (a.e.t.)	Apollon Lympion (C)
MEAP Nisou (D)	5–2	Doxa Devtera (D)
Olympos Xylofagou (D)	0–4	Ayia Napa F.C. (C)
Orfeas Athienou (D)	4–1	ASO Ormideia (D)
OXEN Peristeronas (C)	0–3	Othellos Athienou F.C. (C)
Rotsidis Mammari (D)	5–3	ASIL Lysi (D)
Triptolemus Evrychou (D)	2–1	Ermis Aradippou (C)
Tsaggaris Peledriou (C)	1–2	AEZ Zakakiou (C)

^{1}Result unknown. Digenis Akritas Ipsona qualified to the next round.
^{2}Replay result unknown. Fotiakos Frenarou qualified to the next round.

== Second preliminary round ==
The 14 clubs of the Cypriot Second Division advanced directly to the second preliminary round and met the winners of the first preliminary round ties:

Team 1	Score	Team 2
Ayia Napa F.C. (C)	1–4 (a.e.t.)	Onisilos Sotira (B)
AEK Katholiki (C)	2–1	Akritas Chlorakas (B)
AEK Kythreas (D)	1–7	AEK Kakopetrias (C)
AEZ Zakakiou (C)	1–0	Ethnikos Assia F.C. (B)
Alki Larnaca F.C. (B)	3–1	Fotiakos Frenarou (D)
Digenis Akritas Morphou (B)	0–3	Digenis Akritas Ipsona (C)
Digenis Oroklinis (D)	2–1	Adonis Idaliou (C)
Elpida Xylofagou (D)	3–2	Achyronas Liopetriou (C)
Enosis Kokkinotrimithia (D)	0–6	ENTHOI Lakatamia FC (B)
Iraklis Gerolakkou (D)	3–0	Anorthosi Polemidion (D)
Livadiakos Livadion (C)	1–0	Orfeas Nicosia (B)
MEAP Nisou (D)	4–1	Poseidonas Giolou (D)
Omonia Aradippou (B)	6–0	Apollon Lympion (C)
Orfeas Athienou (D)	0–2	APEP F.C. (B)
Othellos Athienou F.C. (C)	0–1	APEP Pelendriou (B)
Rotsidis Mammari (D)	2–4	PAEEK FC (B)
Triptolemus Evrychou (D)	0–3	Doxa Katokopias F.C. (B)
Chalkanoras Idaliou (B)	1–2	Anagennisi Deryneia (B)

== First round ==
The 14 clubs of the Cypriot First Division advanced directly to the first round and met the winners of the second preliminary round ties:

Team 1	Score	Team 2
AEK Kakopetrias (C)	0–2	Nea Salamis Famagusta FC (A)
AEK Katholiki (C)	1–2	Pezoporikos Larnaca (A)
AEL Limassol (A)	3–1	AEZ Zakakiou (C)
Anagennisi Deryneia (B)	3–2	Digenis Oroklinis (D)
Anorthosis Famagusta FC (A)	3–0	MEAP Nisou (D)
APEP Pelendriou (B)	0–5	APOP Paphos (A)
Apollon Limassol (A)	2–1	ENTHOI Lakatamia FC (B)
Digenis Akritas Ipsona (C)	0–11	AC Omonia (A)
Doxa Katokopias F.C. (B)	1–2	Aris Limassol F.C. (A)
Enosis Neon Paralimni FC (A)	5–2	Onisilos Sotira (B)
EPA Larnaca FC (A)	5–1	Elpida Xylofagou (D)
Evagoras Paphos (A)	3–0	APEP F.C. (B)
Iraklis Gerolakkou (D)	0–6	APOEL FC (A)
Olympiakos Nicosia (A)	3–1	Alki Larnaca F.C. (B)
Omonia Aradippou (B)	1–2	Ethnikos Achna FC (A)
PAEEK FC (B)	3–1	Livadiakos Livadion (C)

== Second round ==
Team 1	Agg.	Team 2	1st leg	2nd leg
AEL Limassol (A)	3–4	Olympiakos Nicosia (A)	2–3	1–1
Anorthosis Famagusta FC (A)	1–0	Evagoras Paphos (A)	0–0	1–0
Apollon Limassol (A)	1–0	AC Omonia (A)	0–0	1–0
APOP Paphos (A)	1–5	APOEL FC (A)	0–1	1–4
Aris Limassol F.C. (A)	3–0	Ethnikos Achna FC (A)	1–0	2–0
PAEEK FC (B)	1–3	EPA Larnaca FC (A)	1–2	0–1
Pezoporikos Larnaca (A)	5–0	Enosis Neon Paralimni FC (A)	3–0	2–0
Nea Salamis Famagusta FC (A)	2–0	Anagennisi Deryneia (B)	2–0	0–0

== Quarter-finals ==
Team 1	Agg.	Team 2	1st leg	2nd leg
APOEL FC (A)	4–2	Anorthosis Famagusta FC (A)	1–0	3–2
Olympiakos Nicosia (A)	3–3 (a)	EPA Larnaca FC (A)	1–1	2–2
Pezoporikos Larnaca (A)	2–3	Apollon Limassol (A)	1–1	1–2
Nea Salamis Famagusta FC (A)	4–3	Aris Limassol F.C. (A)	1–0	3–3

== Semi-finals ==
Team 1	Agg.	Team 2	1st leg	2nd leg
Apollon Limassol (A)	5–2	Olympiakos Nicosia (A)	3–1	2–1
Nea Salamis Famagusta FC (A)	1–3	APOEL FC (A)	1–0	0–3

== Final ==
19 June 1993

APOEL	4–1	Apollon
Šapurić 16' (pen.); Sotiriou 65'; Ioannou 71', 83'		Špoljarić 62' (pen.)

GSZ Stadium, Larnaca

Cypriot Cup 1992–93 Winners
APOEL
13th title

== Sources ==
- "1992/93 Cyprus Cup". Rec.Sport.Soccer Statistics Foundation. 2016-01-14.

== See also ==
- Cypriot Cup
- 1992–93 Cypriot First Division
