= 1992–93 Cypriot Second Division =

Cypriot Second Division
- Season: 1992–93
- Champions: Omonia Ar. (2nd title)
- Promoted: Omonia Ar.; APEP
- Relegated: Digenis; THOI
- Matches played: 182
- Goals scored: 454 (2.49 per match)

The 1992–93 Cypriot Second Division was the 38th season of the Cypriot second-level football league. Omonia Aradippou won their 2nd title.

== Format ==
Fourteen teams participated in the 1992–93 Cypriot Second Division. All teams played against each other twice, once at their home and once away. The team with the most points at the end of the season crowned champions. The first two teams were promoted to 1993–94 Cypriot First Division. The last two teams were relegated to the 1993–94 Cypriot Third Division.

The 3rd-placed team faced the 12th-placed team of the 1992–93 Cypriot First Division, in a two-legged relegation play-off for one spot in the 1993–94 Cypriot First Division. The 12th-placed team faced the 3rd-placed team of the 1992–93 Cypriot Third Division, in a two-legged relegation play-off for one spot in the 1993–94 Cypriot Second Division.

== Changes from previous season ==
Teams promoted to 1992–93 Cypriot First Division

- Ethnikos Achna
- APOP Paphos

Teams relegated from 1991–92 Cypriot First Division

- Alki Larnaca
- Omonia Aradippou

Teams promoted from 1991–92 Cypriot Third Division

- PAEEK FC
- THOI Lakatamia

Teams relegated to 1992–93 Cypriot Third Division

- Othellos Athienou
- Apollon Lympion

== League standings ==
Pos	Team	Pld	W	D	L	GF	GA	GD	Pts	Promotion or relegation
1	Omonia Aradippou (C, P)	26	15	8	3	57	20	+37	53	Promoted to Cypriot First Division
2	APEP (P)	26	14	9	3	42	18	+24	51	Promoted to Cypriot First Division
3	Alki Larnaca	26	11	7	8	35	22	+13	40	Qualification for promotion play-off
4	APEP Pelendriou	26	10	5	11	38	43	−5	35	
5	Doxa Katokopias	26	9	7	10	28	28	0	34	
6	Chalkanoras Idaliou	26	9	7	10	28	34	−6	34	
7	Orfeas Nicosia	26	9	6	11	37	41	−4	33	
8	Akritas Chlorakas	26	8	9	9	23	28	−5	33	
9	Ethnikos Assia	26	7	12	7	24	30	−6	33	
10	PAEEK FC	26	8	8	10	33	36	−3	32	
11	Anagennisi Deryneia	26	9	5	12	28	36	−8	32	
12	Onisilos Sotira (O)	26	9	5	12	25	34	−9	32	Qualification for relegation play-off
13	Digenis Morphou (R)	26	7	10	9	30	35	−5	31	Relegated to Cypriot Third Division
14	THOI Lakatamia (R)	26	5	6	15	26	49	−23	21	Relegated to Cypriot Third Division

Rules for classification: 1) Points, 2) Goal differences, 3) Goal for. Points system: Won=3 points, Drawn=1 point, Lost=0 points
(C) Champions; (O) Play-off winners; (P) Promoted; (R) Relegated

== Playoff ==
=== Promotion playoff ===
The 3rd-placed team, Alki Larnaca, faced the 12th-placed team of the 1992–93 Cypriot First Division, Evagoras Paphos, in a two-legged relegation play-off for one spot in the 1993–94 Cypriot First Division. Evagoras Paphos won both matches and secured their place in the 1993–94 Cypriot First Division.

- Evagoras Paphos 1–0 Alki Larnaca
- Alki Larnaca 0–2 Evagoras Paphos

=== Relegation playoff ===
The 12th-placed team, Onisilos Sotira, faced the 3rd-placed team of the 1992–93 Cypriot Third Division, Tsaggaris Peledriou, in a two-legged relegation play-off for one spot in the 1993–94 Cypriot Second Division. Onisilos won both matches and secured their place in the 1993–94 Cypriot Second Division.

- Onisilos Sotira 3–0 Tsaggaris Peledriou
- Tsaggaris Peledriou 0–2 Onisilos Sotira (The match abandoned at 0–2 and was awarded 0–2 to Onisilos)

== See also ==
- Cypriot Second Division
- 1992–93 Cypriot First Division
- 1992–93 Cypriot Cup

== Sources ==
- "1992/93 Cypriot Second Division". Rec.Sport.Soccer Statistics Foundation. 2016-01-14.
