= Yoncho Arsov =

Bulgarian footballer and manager

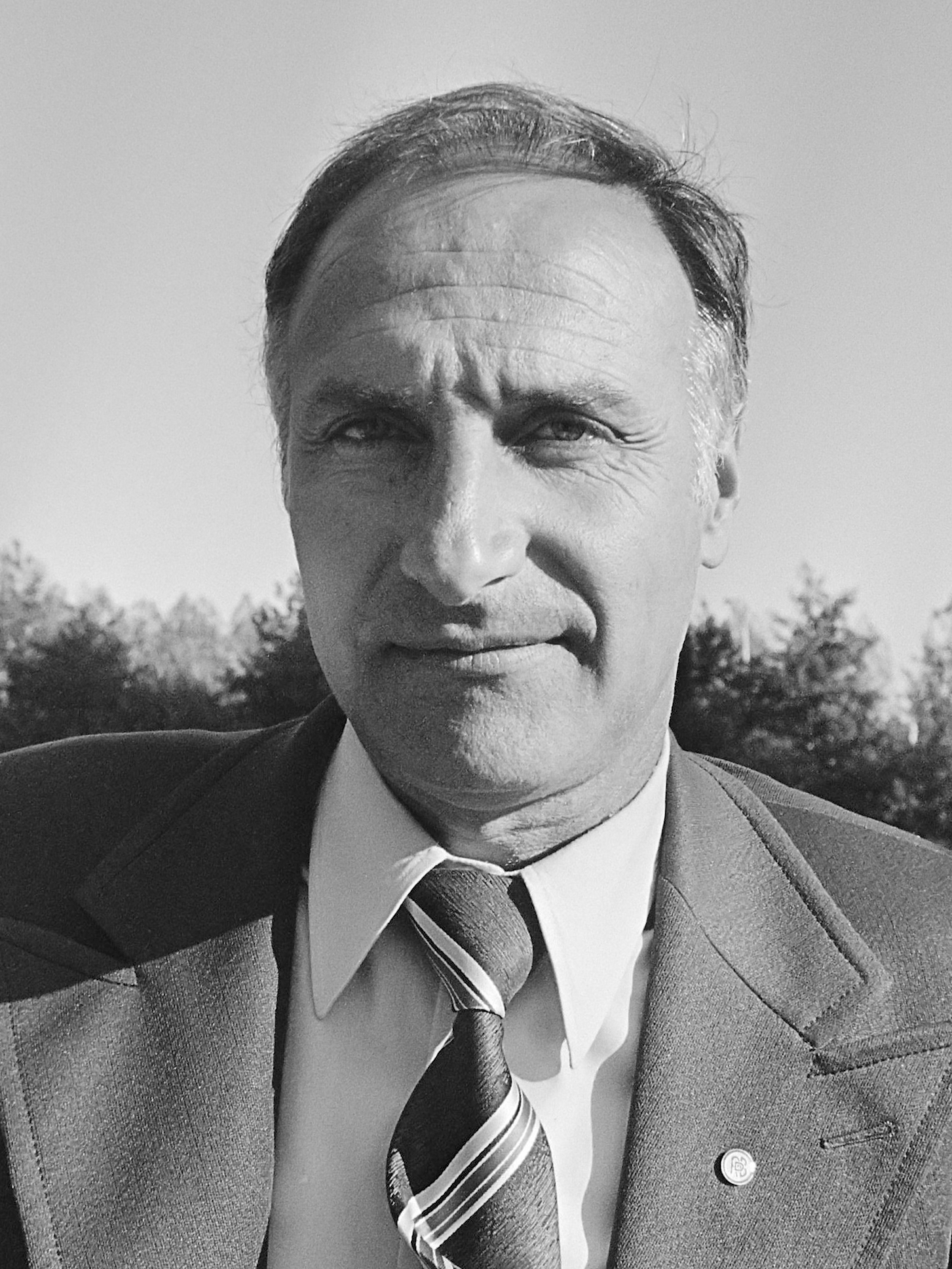
- Yoncho Arsov (1979)

Personal information
- Date of birth: 12 September 1929
- Place of birth: Sofia, Bulgaria
- Date of death: 9 November 2011 (aged 82)
- Position: Midfielder

Senior career*
| Years | Team | Apps | (Gls) |
| 1946–1949 | Septemvri Sofia | | |
| 1949–1955 | VVS Sofia | | |
| 1956–1963 | Levski Sofia | 148 | (4) |

International career
| 1958 | Bulgaria | 2 | (0) |

Managerial career
- 1963–1970: Levski Sofia (assistant)
- 1970–1973: Levski Sofia
- 1973–1976: Lokomotiv Sofia
- 1979–1980: Omonia
- 1986–1989: Omonia
- 1992–1994: Omonia
- 1999–2000: Omonia
- * Club domestic league appearances and goals

Yoncho Arsov (Bulgarian: Йончо Арсов; 12 September 1929 – 9 November 2011) was a Bulgarian football player and manager who played as a midfielder. He was a legendаry manager for AC Omonoia, winning 7 domestic trophies in total, 3 domestic leagues and 4 domestic cups, within the 7 in total years managing AC Omonoia.

== Honours ==
=== Player ===
Levski Sofia

- Bulgarian Cup (3): 1956, 1957, 1959

=== Manager ===
Levski Sofia

- Bulgarian A Group: 1969–70
- Bulgarian Cup (2): 1970, 1971

Omonia

- Cypriot First Division (3): 1986–87, 1988–89, 1992–93
- Cypriot Cup (4): 1980, 1988, 1994, 2000
