= Yiannos Kalotheou =

Cypriot footballer (born 1966)

John Kalotheou
Personal information
- Full name: Yiannos Kalotheou
- Date of birth: May 6, 1966 (age 60)
- Position: Rightback

Youth career
- 1977-1984: Omonia

Senior career*
Years	Team	Apps	(Gls)
1984–1999	Omonia	353	(9)
1999-2000	Anagennisi	13	(0)

International career
1988–1995	Cyprus	25	(0)
- * Club domestic league appearances and goals

Yiannos "John" Kalotheou (Greek: Γιάννος Καλοθέου) (born 6 May 1966) is a Cypriot retired football midfielder.

== Club career ==
After coming through the club's youth ranks, Kalotheou made his senior debut as an attacking midfielder for Omonia on 28 October 1984 against ENP. He was soon established as a rightback and went on to play 353 games for Omonia until 1999, winning 4 league titles and three domestic cups. He made history when he scored twice in extra time to beat Slavia Sofia in the 1990–91 UEFA Cup first round and see Omonia through to the second round.

== International career ==
Kalotheou made his debut for Cyprus in a November 1988 friendly match away against Malta and earned a total of 25 caps (no goals). His final international was an October 1995 European Championship qualification match against Macedonia.

== Personal life ==
His father Drosos and brother Costas also played for Omonia and his uncles Filippos and Marios played for Olympiakos Nicosia.

== Honours ==
- Cypriot First Division: 4

1985, 1987, 1989, 1993

- Cypriot Cup: 3

1988, 1991, 1994
