= Drosos Kalotheou =

Cypriot footballer (1945–2024)

Personal information
- Date of birth: 21 February 1945
- Date of death: 20 June 2024 (aged 79)
- Position: Midfielder

Senior career*
Years	Team	Apps	(Gls)
1961–1970	Omonia	121	(30)
1970–1974	AEM Morphou		

International career
1965–1968	Cyprus	5	(0)
- * Club domestic league appearances and goals

Drosos Kalotheou (Greek: Δρόσος Καλοθέου; 21 February 1945 – 20 June 2024) was a Cypriot footballer. He played in five matches for the Cyprus national team from 1965 to 1968.

Kalotheou scored 30 goals in 121 matches for Omonia Nicosia between 1961 and 1970. He then played for AEM Morphou until the Turkish invasion of Cyprus in 1974 ended his career.

== Personal life and death ==
His sons John and Kostas also played for Omonia and his younger brothers Filippos and Marios played for Olympiakos Nicosia. Drosos Kalotheou died on 20 June 2024, at the age of 79.

== Honours ==
Omonia

- Cypriot First Division: 1961, 1966
- Cypriot Cup: 1965
