= 1992–93 Cypriot Third Division =

Cypriot Third Division
- Season: 1992–93
- Champions: AEZ Zakakiou (1st title)
- Promoted: AEZ Zakakiou; Ermis Aradippou FC
- Relegated: Ethnikos Defteras; Apollon Lympion; OXEN Peristeronas

The 1992–93 Cypriot Third Division was the 22nd season of the Cypriot third-level football league. AEZ Zakakiou won their 1st title.

== Format ==
Fourteen teams participated in the 1992–93 Cypriot Third Division. All teams played against each other twice, once at their home and once away. The team with the most points at the end of the season crowned champions. The first two teams were promoted to 1993–94 Cypriot Second Division. The last three teams were relegated to the 1993–94 Cypriot Fourth Division.

The 3rd-placed team faced the 12th-placed team of the 1993–94 Cypriot Second Division, in a two-legged relegation play-off for one spot in the 1993–94 Cypriot Second Division.

=== Point system ===
Teams received three points for a win, one point for a draw and zero points for a loss.

== League standings ==
Pos	Team	Pld	W	D	L	GF	GA	GD	Pts	Promotion or relegation
1	AEZ Zakakiou	26	–	–	–	54	27	+27	53	Promoted to 1993–94 Cypriot Second Division
2	Ermis Aradippou FC	26	–	–	–	63	42	+21	49	Promoted to 1993–94 Cypriot Second Division
3	Tsaggaris Peledriou	26	–	–	–	51	38	+13	49	Promotion playoff
4	AEK Katholiki	26	–	–	–	53	29	+24	48	
5	Othellos Athienou FC	26	–	–	–	37	33	+4	42	
6	Adonis Idaliou	26	–	–	–	44	37	+7	39	
7	Livadiakos Livadion	26	–	–	–	44	37	+7	39	
8	AEK Kakopetrias	26	–	–	–	34	30	+4	35	
9	Achyronas Liopetriou	26	–	–	–	30	37	−7	35	
10	Digenis Akritas Ipsona	26	–	–	–	42	33	+9	34	
11	Ayia Napa FC	26	–	–	–	46	43	+3	30	
12	Ethnikos Defteras	26	–	–	–	29	34	−5	28	Relegated to 1993–94 Cypriot Fourth Division
13	Apollon Lympion	26	–	–	–	29	48	−19	21	Relegated to 1993–94 Cypriot Fourth Division
14	OXEN Peristeronas	26	–	–	–	20	98	−78	4	Relegated to 1993–94 Cypriot Fourth Division

Rules for classification: 1) Points, 2) Goal differences, 3) Goal for

== Promotion playoff ==
- Onisilos Sotira 3 – 0 Tsaggaris Peledriou
- Tsaggaris Peledriou 0 – 2 Onisilos Sotira

== Sources ==
- "Μια ντουζίνα γκολ η ΑΕΖ". Phileleftheros (in Greek). 1993-05-31. p. 13.

== See also ==
- Cypriot Third Division
- 1992–93 Cypriot First Division
- 1992–93 Cypriot Cup
