= Evagoras Christofi =

Cypriot footballer (born 1961)

Personal information
- Date of birth: 28 June 1961 (age 65)
- Position: Defender

Senior career*
Years	Team	Apps	(Gls)
1979–1996	AC Omonia	463	(108)

International career
1985–1994	Cyprus	25	(1)
- * Club domestic league appearances and goals

Evagoras Christofi (Greek: Ευαγόρας Χριστοφή;born 28 June 1961) is a former Cypriot footballer, widely regarded as one of the most important players in the history of AC Omonia Nicosia, one of Cyprus' most successful football clubs. He played primarily as a defender, but his versatility allowed him to start his career as a forward before transitioning into a libero, a role he excelled in both defensively and offensively.

== Early Career and Club Success ==
Evagoras Christofi joined Omonia Nicosia in 1979 at the age of 17, and he remained with the club until 1996, with a brief three-year break between 1982 and 1985. During that time, he was in New York for studies. Christofi's contribution to Omonia was immense, helping the club win a total of 18 titles, including:

● 5 league championships
● 6 Cypriot Cups
● 7 Super Cups (Shields)

He made 463 appearances for the club and scored 108 goals, a rare accomplishment for a defender. Christofi is remembered by Omonia fans for his leadership on the field and his exceptional ability to score, especially through headers due to his strong leaping ability. His versatility and skills made him one of the top defenders worldwide in terms of goal-scoring.

=== Notable Moments ===
One of the most memorable moments of Christofi's career came during the 1992-1993 season when he scored the opening goal in Omonia's 2-0 victory over Apollon Limassol. This victory helped secure the championship for Omonia, returning the club to the top of Cypriot football after a four-year drought.

=== International career ===
Christofi also had a notable international career with the Cyprus National Football Team, earning 25 caps and scoring 1 goal for his country. His performances at both the club and international levels earned him recognition, and in 1987, he was named Footballer of the Year by the Cyprus Sports Writers' Association (EAK).
