= OMONOIA TV =

Cypriot sports channel

- Country: Cyprus

Ownership
- Owner: Omonia FC

History
- Launched: July 1, 2024

OMONOIA TV is a Cypriot subscription-based television channel, entirely dedicated to AC Omonia.

The channel is available as an additional sports package on Cytavision and Primetel for a monthly fee. It began broadcasting on 1 July 2024 at 19:48, as a reference to the year AC Omonia was founded. It is the first and only official television channel of a sports club in Cyprus.

Its content includes news bulletins, exclusive interviews and behind-the-scenes material, entertainment shows, documentaries, and replays of past matches. It also offers live broadcasts of the football team's friendly matches, as well as official matches of the academy, and of the volleyball, futsal, basketball, and women's football departments.
