= Ethnikos Empas =

Ethnikos Empas (Greek: Εθνικός Έμπας) was a Cypriot association football club based in Empa, located in the Paphos District. It has 1 participation in Cypriot Fourth Division (1992–93 Cypriot Fourth Division).
