= Nedim Tutić =

Bosnian footballer

Personal information
- Full name: Nedim Tutić
- Date of birth: 17 July 1968 (age 58)
- Place of birth: SFR Yugoslavia
- Position: Midfielder

Team information
- Current team: Digenis Morphou (manager)

Senior career*
Years	Team	Apps	(Gls)
1985–1986	FK Sarajevo	4	(0)
1988–1989	Liria Prizren	31	(10)
1989–1990	Sloboda Užice	19	(1)
1990–1992	Rad	32	(5)
1992–1996	Omonia	107	(14)
1996	Zeytinburnuspor	4	(0)
1996–1997	Olympiakos Nicosia	12	(3)
1997–1998	Ethnikos Assia	14	(1)

Managerial career
- 2008–2009: Omonia
- 2010: Nea Salamis
- 2017–2018: Othellos Athienou
- 2019–2021: Kunshan
- 2019–2021: Othellos Athienou
- 2021–2022: Alki Oroklini
- 2022: Olympiakos Nicosia
- 2022–2023: Othellos Athienou
- 2023: Olympiakos Nicosia
- 2023–2024: PAC Omonia 29M
- 2024–: Digenis Morphou
- * Club domestic league appearances and goals

Nedim Tutić (born 17 July 1968) is a Bosnian professional football manager and former player who is current manager of Cypriot Second Division club Digenis Morphou.

== Club career ==
Tutić played for Liria Prizren and FK Sloboda Užice in the Yugoslav Second League, and with FK Sarajevo and FK Rad in the Yugoslav First League. He had a brief spell with Zeytinburnuspor in the Turkish Super Lig.

== Managerial statistics ==
As of 22 February 2025

Team	Nat	From	To	Record							
Team	Nat	From	To	P	W	D	L	GF	GA	GD	W%
Omonia	(Cyprus)	4 March 2008	16 March 2009	41	26	7	8	84	39	+45	63.4
Nea Salamis	(Cyprus)	1 July 2010	31 December 2010	14	5	6	3	15	13	+2	35.7
Othellos Athienou	(Cyprus)	13 December 2017	20 April 2018	18	12	5	1	35	11	+24	66.7
Kunshan	(China)	1 January 2019	25 August 2019	26	13	4	9	32	25	+7	50.0
Othellos Athienou	(Cyprus)	23 December 2019	31 May 2021	44	22	10	12	68	50	+18	50.0
Alki Oroklini	(Cyprus)	1 July 2021	2 March 2022	24	13	4	7	38	24	+14	54.2
Olympiakos Nicosia	(Cyprus)	3 March 2022	6 August 2022	10	5	3	2	16	8	+8	50.0
Othellos Athienou	(Cyprus)	12 November 2022	30 January 2023	10	7	0	3	18	12	+6	70.0
Olympiakos Nicosia	(Cyprus)	10 April 2023	30 June 2023	11	1	2	8	10	21	−11	9.1
PAC Omonia 29M	(Cyprus)	1 July 2023	30 June 2024	31	18	7	6	47	23	+24	58.1
Digenis Morphou	(Cyprus)	16 October 2024	Present	17	11	2	4	29	21	+8	64.7
Total				246	133	50	63	392	247	+145	54.1
