= PAC Omonia 29M =

PAC Omonia
- Full name: People's Athletic Club Omonia 29 May
- Founded: 29 May 2018; 8 years ago
- Stadium: Katokopia Stadium
- Capacity: 3,500
- Chairman: Anastasios Christodoulidis
- Coach: Fangio Buyse
- League: First Division
- 2025–26: Second Division, 3rd of 14 (promoted)
- Website: https://www.o29m.com

PΑC Omonia 29M (Greek: ΑΛΣ Ομόνοια 29Μ; Αθλητικό Λαϊκό Σωματείο Ομόνοια 29ης Μαΐου; People's Athletic Club Omonia 29 May), commonly known as PAC Omonia, ALS Omonia or Omonia 29M, is a Cypriot professional football club based in Nicosia.

PAC Omonia 29M was formed on 29 May 2018 by the Gate 9, AC Omonia's ultras, due to a disagreement regarding the ownership of the club. They currently play in the Cypriot First Division.

== History ==
=== Separation from AC Omonia ===
On 29 May 2018, due to continued financial difficulties, the ownership of AC Omonia's football department officially converted from complete fan-ownership to a for-profit ownership under American-Cypriot businessman Stavros Papastavrou. The Gate 9 supporter group were unhappy with the change and on the same day, decided to form a breakaway club. The club was officially founded on 23 July 2018, under the name PAC Omonia 1948. In 2020, it was renamed as PAC Omonia 29M, for legal reasons.

=== Rise to the First Division ===
In August 2018, Omonia 29M joined the Pansoleio Sports Federation, which hosts an amateur league in the 5th tier of Cypriot football. In their first active season, Omonia 29M won the 2018–19 Pansoleio League and Cup, and earned the right to participate in the 2019 STOK promotion play-offs, where they secured promotion to the STOK Elite Division, the fourth tier of Cypriot football.

Omonia 29M were leading the 2019–20 STOK Elite Division, when the season was abandoned due to the COVID-19 pandemic. They were not named champions, but were awarded promotion to the Third Division. Their rapid rise of the Cypriot football hierarchy continued the following year, when the club won the 2020–21 Cypriot Third Division, and earned promotion to the Second Division. This also allowed them to participate in the Cypriot Cup, where, the following season, they were knocked out by Pafos FC in the first round. The team's supporters did not enter the stadium in protest of the "fan card", which they had to present at the entrance, since the game involved a club from the First Division.

After three years in the second tier, Omonia 29M finished 2nd in the league, and was able to secure promotion to the First Division. They were led to this success by former Omonia FC player and manager Nedim Tutić. It is also worth noting that a former FA Cup winner and Omonia FC captain, Jordi Gómez played for the club during the second half of the 2022–23 season.

== List of seasons ==
Season	League									Cup		Top goalscorer		Manager(s)
Season	Div.	Pos.	Pl.	W	D	L	GS	GA	P	Comp.	Round	Name	League	Manager(s)
2018–19	Regional	1st	?							Regional	Winner	?		(Cyprus) Michalis Sergiou
2019–20	STOK	1st (Ab.)	22	18	2	2	61	9	56	Lower Divisions Cup	Quarterfinals	(Cyprus) Dimitris Tzionis	14	(Cyprus) Michalis Sergiou
2020–21	3rd	1st	30	21	5	4	54	25	68	Lower Divisions Cup	Second Round (Ab.)	(Cyprus) Ioannis Stouppis	13	(Cyprus) Michalis Sergiou
2021–22	2nd	10th	30	9	9	12	31	33	36	Cypriot Cup	First Round	(Cyprus) Theodosis Kyprou	7	(Cyprus) Nikolas Nikolaou
2022–23	2nd	4th	29	14	8	7	32	23	50	Cypriot Cup	First Round	(Cyprus) Dimitris Froxylias (Cyprus) Theodosis Kyprou	5	(Cyprus) Apostolos Makridis (Cyprus) Ioannis Limpouris
2023–24	2nd	2nd	29	17	7	5	46	21	58	Cypriot Cup	Second Round	(Portugal) Fabinho	7	(Bosnia and Herzegovina) Nedim Tutić

== Stadium ==
In the lower divisions, Omonia 29Μ played at the Dimitris Hamatsos, ground-sharing with Chalkanoras Idaliou. The stadium has a capacity of 3,500. After promotion to the first division, they played at Katokopia Stadium in Peristerona.

== Players ==
As of 20 September 2026

Note: Flags indicate national team as defined under FIFA eligibility rules; some limited exceptions apply. Players may hold more than one non-FIFA nationality.

No.	Pos.	Nation	Player
1	GK	GRE	Nikos Grammatikakis
4	DF	CYP	Alexandros Kaiafas
5	MF	GRE	Stavros Tsoukalas
6	MF	GRE	Rushit Zeka (on loan from Panathinaikos)
7	FW	NED	Rashaan Fernandes
8	MF	CYP	Charalambos Aristotelous
10	MF	POR	Mike Morais
11	FW	MAS	Fergus Tierney
14	DF	CYP	Henry Bates Andreou
15	DF	CYP	Stylianos Panteli
16	MF	CYP	Konstantinos Pattichis
17	FW	CYP	Panagiotis Zachariou
19	DF	MEX	Antonio Portales
20	DF	CYP	Sotiris Fiakas
21	FW	GRE	Georgios Sokos (on loan from Panathinaikos)

No.	Pos.	Nation	Player
22	MF	NGR	Kelechi Nwakali
23	MF	ARG	Facundo García
24	DF	GRE	Angelos Vyntra (on loan from Panathinaikos)
26	MF	CYP	Marios Antoniou
30	DF	CRO	Matej Senić
31	GK	CYP	Miltiades Demosthenous
43	GK	CYP	Antonis Mavrantonis
44	DF	GRE	Dimitrios Chantakias
45	FW	GBS	Steve Ambri
46	DF	CYP	Modestos Soteriou
77	FW	POR	Luís Santos
97	GK	SRB	Stefan Stojanović
98	GK	NGR	Francis Uzoho

=== Out on loan ===
Note: Flags indicate national team as defined under FIFA eligibility rules; some limited exceptions apply. Players may hold more than one non-FIFA nationality.

No.	Pos.	Nation	Player

== Honours ==
- Cypriot Third Division
  - Winners: 2020–21

== Sponsorship ==
In August 2026, Omonia 29M announced a sponsorship agreement with Meridianbet for the 2026–27 season. Under the agreement, the company's logo appeared on the front of the club's official match shirt.
