= Gate 9 =

Football group

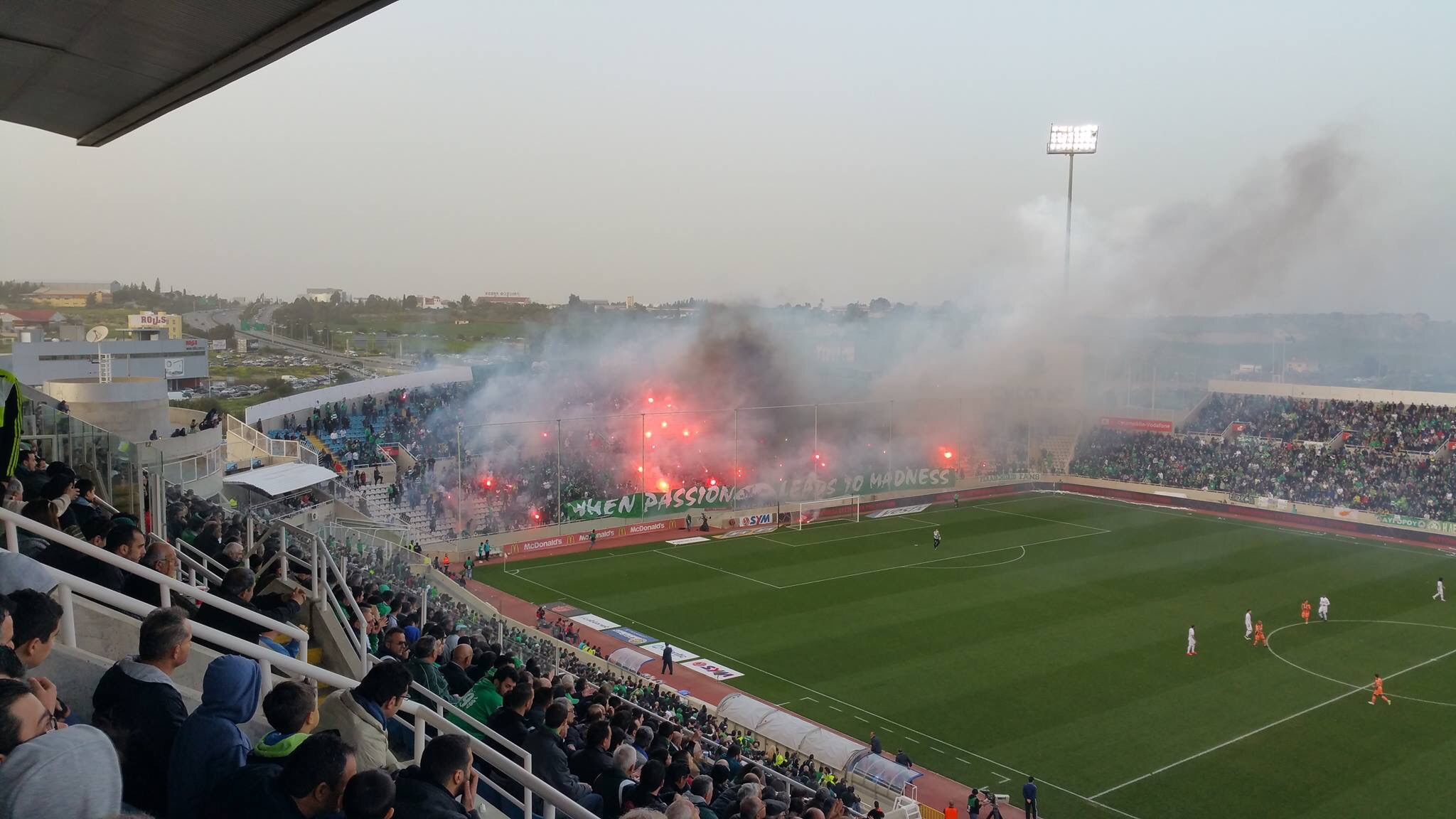
- Established: 25 October 1992; 33 years ago
- Type: Ultras
- Team: PAC Omonia 29M AC Omonia
- Location: Pallouriotissa, Nicosia

Gate 9 (Greek: Θύρα 9) is a Cypriot Ultras group that supports PAC Omonia 29M and the non-football departments of AC Omonia.

== History ==
=== AC Omonia ===
Gate 9 was established on 25 October 1992, in Nicosia, as the Ultras group of AC Omonia, one of Cyprus' most popular teams. Initially, the group was seated under the main clock of the Makario Stadium, Omonia's then home ground, before moving to its North stand. In 1999, Omonia moved to the GSP Stadium, and Gate 9 followed, occupying the North stand.

=== PAC Omonia 29M ===
On 29 May 2018, AC Omonia held a general assembly, where 97% of the club's members voted in favor of converting its football department from fan-ownership, to a for-profit ownership under American-Cypriot businessman Stavros Papastavrou. The decision was made due to the club's several-year-long financial difficulties. Gate 9 had previously condemned the idea, stating it would go against Omonia's principles, and believing that another solution could be found.

On the same day, Gate 9 held an assembly, where, through a voting process, they decided to stop supporting AC Omonia's football team, and create a breakaway club. Thus, People's Athletic Club Omonia 29M was officially founded on 23 July 2018. In August, the club began playing in the 5th tier of Cypriot football, and currently plays in the First Division. Gate 9 continues to support the rest of AC Omonia's departments.

== Popularity and ideology ==
Omonia supporters are traditionally left wing. A 2009 gallop poll estimated that three out of four Omonia fans vote for the Progressive Party of Working People, the communist party of Cyprus. While Gate 9 retains its left wing beliefs, at times it has been openly critical of the party's involvement in the club's administrative decisions. The party has denied accusations that it influences club decisions. Gate 9 members are associated with communist beliefs and have been noted for waving banners bearing Che Guevara's portrait, and other communist symbols. They have established relations with other left-wing supporters, such as those of Hapoel Tel Aviv and Standard Liège. The group is also involved in humanitarian work for refugees in Cyprus. Besides Nicosia, Gate 9 has fan clubs in Larnaca, Limassol, Paphos, Athens, Thessaloniki and London.

== Violence ==
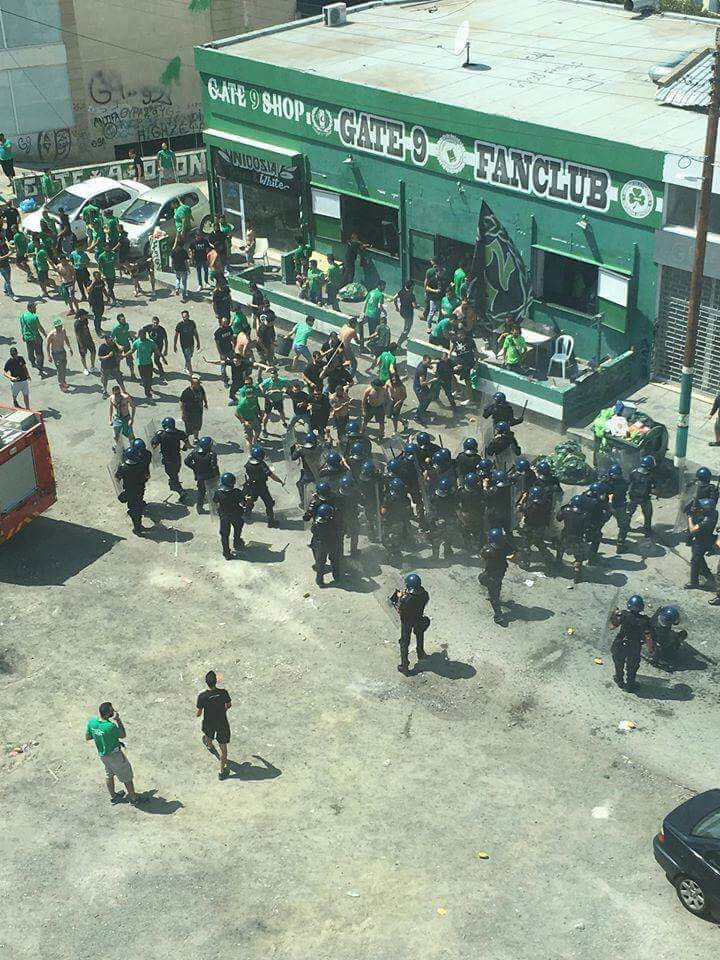
Gate 9 members clash with riot police

The group often engages in violent clashes with members of the police, or supporters of other teams. In November 2009, the group was involved in clashes with fans of local rivals APOEL FC that resulted in a serious injury of an APOEL fan. In January 2012, a basketball match was interrupted when the group entered the pitch. In March 2012, the group caused damage to the GSP Stadium and injured 11 policemen after a football match. In June 2013, a football match was interrupted due to clashes between the group and Anorthosis Famagusta fans. In March 2014, during a volleyball match, riots by Gate 9 led to 11 members of the group being arrested. On 22 July 2014, clashes occurred in Larnaca, between fans of Jagiellonia Białystok and Cypriots. Jagiellonia would face Omonia the next day in Europa League qualifications. It was strongly hinted on social media by Gate 9 members that the group was involved in the clashes. On 18 May 2016, riots broke out outside the group's clubhouse in Nicosia between Gate 9 members and riot police. Later that day, around 20 members of the group were involved in clashes with fans of Apollon Limassol after the Cypriot Cup Final.
