= 1992–93 Cypriot Fourth Division =

Cypriot Fourth Division
- Season: 1992–93
- Champions: Ethnikos Latsion FC; Fotiakos Frenarou; APEI Ipsona
- Promoted: Ethnikos Latsion FC; Fotiakos Frenarou; APEI Ipsona
- Relegated: 28 teams

The 1992–93 Cypriot Fourth Division was the eighth season of the Cypriot fourth-level football league. The championship was split into three geographical groups, representing the Districts of Cyprus. The winners were:

- Nicosia-Keryneia Group: Ethnikos Latsion FC
- Larnaca-Famagusta Group: Fotiakos Frenarou
- Limassol-Paphos Group: APEI Ipsona

The three winners were promoted to the 1993–94 Cypriot Third Division. 28 teams were relegated to regional leagues since the 1993–94 Cypriot Fourth Division was held as a single division.

== See also ==
- Cypriot Fourth Division
- 1992–93 Cypriot First Division
- 1992–93 Cypriot Cup
