= Philipp Kühn =

German footballer

Personal information
- Date of birth: 2 September 1992 (age 34)
- Place of birth: Beckum, Germany
- Height: 1.89 m (6 ft 2 in)
- Position: Goalkeeper

Team information
- Current team: Apollon Limassol
- Number: 22

Youth career
- –2010: Rot-Weiss Ahlen

Senior career*
Years	Team	Apps	(Gls)
2010–2011	Rot-Weiss Ahlen	15	(0)
2011–2016	SV Sandhausen	4	(0)
2013–2015	→ Rot-Weiß Oberhausen	57	(0)
2016–2017	FC Viktoria Köln	33	(0)
2017–2018	SV Drochtersen/Assel	12	(0)
2018–2024	VfL Osnabrück	155	(0)
2024–	Apollon	43	(0)
- * Club domestic league appearances and goals as of 14 June 2026

Philipp Kühn (born 2 September 1992) is a German professional footballer who plays as a goalkeeper for Cypriot First Division club Apollon Limassol

== Career statistics ==
As of match played 11 August 2026

Appearances and goals by club, season and competition
Club	Season	League			National cup (Note: Includes DFB Pokal, Cypriot Cup)		Europe		Other		Total	
Club	Season	Division	Apps	Goals	Apps	Goals	Apps	Goals	Apps	Goals	Apps	Goals
Rot Weiss Ahlen	2010–11	3. Liga	15	0	0	0	—		—		15	0
Sandhausen	2011–12	3. Liga	3	0	0	0	—		—		3	0
Sandhausen	2012–13	2. Bundesliga	1	0	0	0	—		—		1	0
Sandhausen	2013–14	2. Bundesliga	0	0	0	0	—		—		0	0
Sandhausen	2014–15	2. Bundesliga	0	0	0	0	—		—		0	0
Sandhausen	2015–16	2. Bundesliga	0	0	0	0	—		—		0	0
Sandhausen	Total		4	0	0	0	—		—		4	0
Rot-Weiß Oberhausen (loan)	2013–14	Regionalliga West	24	0	—		—		—		24	0
Rot-Weiß Oberhausen (loan)	2014–15	Regionalliga West	33	0	—		—		—		33	0
Rot-Weiß Oberhausen (loan)	Total		57	0	—		—		—		57	0
Viktoria Köln	2016–17	Regionalliga West	32	0	1	0	—		1 (Note: Appearance(s) in Regionalliga Promotion play-offs)	0	34	0
Drochtersen/Assel	2017–18	Regionalliga Nord	30	0	—		—		—		30	0
Osnabrück	2018–19	3. Liga	5	0	—		—		—		5	0
Osnabrück	2019–20	2. Bundesliga	28	0	0	0	—		—		28	0
Osnabrück	2020–21	2. Bundesliga	33	0	2	0	—		2 (Note: Appearance(s) in 2. Bundesliga Relegation play-offs)	0	37	0
Osnabrück	2021–22	3. Liga	38	0	2	0	—		—		40	0
Osnabrück	2022–23	3. Liga	32	0	—		—		—		32	0
Osnabrück	2023–24	2. Bundesliga	19	0	1	0	—		—		20	0
Osnabrück	Total		155	0	5	0	—		2	0	162	0
Apollon Limassol	2024–25	Cypriot First Division	16	0	1	0	—		—		17	0
Apollon Limassol	2025–26	Cypriot First Division	27	0	6	0	—		—		33	0
Apollon Limassol	2026–27	Cypriot First Division	0	0	0	0	3 (Note: Appearance(s) in UEFA Conference League)	0	—		3	0
Apollon Limassol	Total		43	0	7	0	3	0	—		53	0
Career total			336	0	13	0	3	0	3	0	355	0
