= Tsvetan Ilchev =

Bulgarian football manager

Personal information
- Date of birth: 6 September 1936
- Date of death: 25 November 2015 (aged 79)

Managerial career
- Years: Team
- 1975–1976: Omonia Nicosia
- 1978–1979: Bulgaria
- 1979–1980: Doxa Drama
- 1982–1984: Anorthosis Famagusta
- 1986: Doxa Drama

Tsvetan Ilchev (Bulgarian: Цветан Илчев; 6 September 1936 – 25 November 2015) was a Bulgarian football manager.
