= Makario Stadium =

Sports venue in Cyprus

Coordinates: 35°8′46″N 33°18′52″E

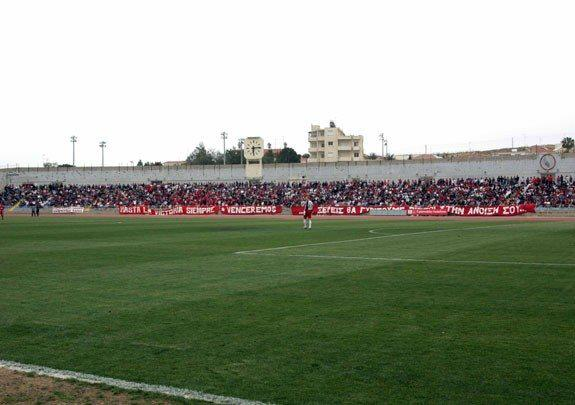
- Interactive map of Makario Stadium
- Full name: Makario Athletic Centre
- Location: Nicosia, Cyprus
- Capacity: 15,590
- Surface: Grass

Construction
- Built: 1978
- Opened: 1978

Tenants
- APOEL Nicosia (1978–1999); Omonia Nicosia (1978–1999); Olympiakos Nicosia (1993–1999, 2008–2009, 2013–2021, 2022–2024); Ethnikos Assia (2001–2025); Digenis Morphou (2001–2025); Doxa Katokopias (2007–2011, 2013–2022); Iraklis Gerolakkou (2022-2025)

Makario Stadium (Greek: Μακάρειο Στάδιο), is an all-seater multi-purpose stadium in Nicosia, Cyprus. It was the largest and main sports venue of the capital up to the construction of the GSP stadium in 1999. At present it is mostly used for football matches and is the home ground of Olympiakos Nicosia, Digenis Morphou, and Ethnikos Assia. The stadium holds 15,590 seated spectators. The playing field is surrounded by a running track and can be adapted to hold most track and field events. Apart from corporate boxes and the press centre, there are no coverings for spectators.

It is built in the Nicosia suburb of Makedonitissa, close to the grounds of the Cyprus State Fair, with which it shares a large car park.

Over the years it has served as the home ground for Nicosia teams such as AC Omonia, APOEL and Olympiakos. The Cypriot national team has also played home matches there in the past. All those teams have now relocated to the New GSP stadium. The ultras of APOEL (PANSYFI - AU79) and Omonia (Gate-9) were formed during the years their teams played at the stadium.

The Makario was built in 1978 and is named after Makarios III, the Ethnarch of Cyprus; Archbishop and first President of Cyprus. It has hosted many Cypriot Cup and Super Cup finals and was the main venue for the 1989 Games of the Small States of Europe.

The record for the highest attendance at the stadium was 30,000 spectators on 6 November 1985, for the match between Omonia Nicosia and Anderlecht in the 1985–86 European Cup last-16 round.

Publications of the time state that there were 34,000 spectators at the Makarios stadium, which is a record number of fans in Cypriot stadiums.
