= Nikos Grammatikakis =

Greek footballer

Personal information
- Full name: Nikolaos Grammatikakis
- Date of birth: 26 May 2003 (age 23)
- Place of birth: Athens, Greece
- Height: 1.88 m (6 ft 2 in)
- Position: Goalkeeper

Team information
- Current team: Volos
- Number: 70

Youth career
- 2014–2021: Olympiacos
- 2021–2023: Asteras Tripolis

Senior career*
Years	Team	Apps	(Gls)
2023–2025	Asteras Tripolis	8	(0)
2024–2025	Asteras Tripolis B	9	(0)
2025–	Volos	1	(0)

International career^{‡}
2024	Greece U21	1	(0)
- * Club domestic league appearances and goals as of 24 January 2026 ‡ National team caps and goals as of 11 October 2024

Nikos Grammatikakis (Greek: Νίκος Γραμματικάκης; born 26 May 2003) is a Greek professional footballer who plays as a goalkeeper for Super League club Volos.

== Career ==
=== Asteras Tripolis ===
On 21 December 2023, Grammatikakis made his professional debut for Asteras Tripolis.
