= AC Omonia =

Multi-sport club based in Nicosia, Cyprus

Omonoia
- Full name: Αθλητικός Σύλλογος Ομόνοια Λευκωσίας (Athletic Club Omonoia Nicosia)
- Nicknames: Η Βασίλισσα (The Queen); Το Τριφύλλι (The Shamrock)
- Founded: 4 June 1948; 78 years ago
- Ground: GSP Stadium
- Capacity: 22,859
- President: Stavros Papastavrou
- Head coach: Henning Berg
- League: First Division
- 2025–26: First Division, 1st of 14 (champions)
- Website: omonoiafc.com.cy
Home colours	Away colours	Third colours

Athletic Club Omonoia Nicosia (Greek: Αθλητικός Σύλλογος Ομόνοια Λευκωσίας; Athlitikós Sýllogos Omónoia Lefkosías), commonly known as Omonoia Nicosia, or simply Omonoia (also transliterated as Omonia), is a Cypriot professional multi-sport club, established on 4 June 1948 in Nicosia. It is best known for its football department, which has participated in the Cypriot First Division since 1953. On 14 June 2018, the football department of AC Omonoia became a professional for-profit football company, and is since known as Omonoia FC.

Omonoia is one of Cyprus' most successful football clubs, having won 22 National Championships, 16 Cups, and a record 17 Super Cups. Omonoia has won five doubles and a record three domestic trebles, and is one of three Cypriot clubs to never have been relegated to the second division. Omonoia also holds an outstanding record of 14 championships in two decades (between 1970 and 1989), a record of being either champion or runner-up 14 times in a row in the championship (between 1973 and 1986), and the record of having won the Cypriot Cup four times in a row (between 1980 and 1983).

AC Omonoia also operates departments in basketball, volleyball, futsal, cycling, runners, women's football and women's volleyball.

== History ==
=== Creation and early years (1948–1953) ===
On 23 May 1948, the governing board of APOEL football club sent a telegram to the Hellenic Association of Amateur Athletics (Greek: Σ.Ε.Γ.Α.Σ.), with the opportunity of the annual Panhellenic Track and Field Competition. In its telegram, the board stated its wish for what it described as the "communist mutiny" to be ended. Club players considering this action as a specifically political comment on the Greek Civil War distanced themselves from the board and were duly expelled from APOEL. On 4 June 1948, Dr. Mattheos Papapetrou organized a meeting in Nicosia that led to the creation of Omonia. Many players expelled from APOEL were present at the meeting and joined the new club. Along with other left-wing teams such as Nea Salamina, Alki Larnaca and Orfeas Nicosia, Omonia helped create the Cyprus Amateur Football Federation in December 1948. Omonia took part in the CAFF league until 1953, having won four out of five played championships and five out of five played cups. Omonia was then accepted by the Cyprus Football Association to participate in the Cypriot First Division.

=== Beginnings in the Cypriot First Division (1953–1969) ===
After joining the Cypriot First Division in 1953, Omonia only placed seventh out of nine teams in the 1953–54 season, barely avoiding relegation. During that decade, the club's best placing came during the 1956–57 season when the club finished in the third position.

The team would make its closest push for the title during the 1959–60 season after finishing second, one point behind Anorthosis Famagusta. The following year, after seven seasons in the First Division, the club would win its first title in 1960–61 season. Omonia, in that season, would score 91 goals in 24 matches on their way to their first ever Cyprus First Division title. Omonia won their second title during the 1965–66 season.

=== Golden era (1970s–1980s) ===
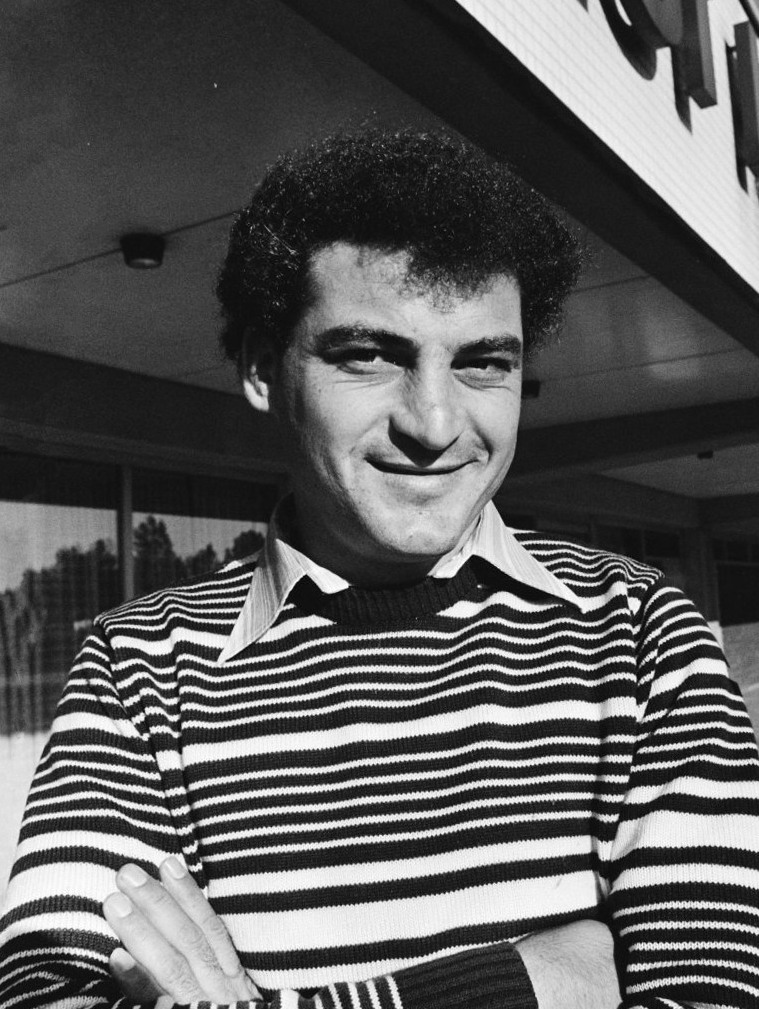
Sotiris Kaiafas is not only considered one of Omonia's all-time greatest, but the best footballer in the history of Cypriot football.

Omonia won its first trophies of the decade in 1972, when the club won both the league and the cup. Led by a young Sotiris Kaiafas, Omonia won seven league titles in the 1970s, six of them were consecutive (1974–1979). At the end of the decade, Omonia had a total of nine championship titles and three cups. At the end of the 1979 season, Omonia trailed its arch-rival APOEL by two championships. In 1976, Sotiris Kaiafas would go on and win the European Golden Shoe for his single-season 39-goal performance. In 2003, he was awarded the UEFA Jubilee Awards for the Best Cypriot Footballer of the 20th century.

The 1980s was a successful decade for the club as it won an additional seven Cypriot League Championship titles including another five consecutive in 1981, 1982, 1983, 1984, 1985, and in 1987 and in 1989. As the 1980s came to an end, Omonia had won 14 Cypriot championship titles, becoming the most successful team on the island at the time.

=== General decline (1990s) ===
The 1990s would prove to be less successful than the previous two decades. During this time, Omonia only mustered one Cypriot League title during the 1992–93 season. It would be eight years before Omonia would see its next title. In 1997, Omonia signed the German Rainer Rauffmann, who would later become the second top goalscorer ever for the club. With the help of other Omonia great and then captain, Costas Malekkos, and a young Costas Kaiafas (the son of Sotiris Kaiafas), Rauffmann would become top scorer of the Cypriot First Division in 1997–98, 1998–99, 1999–00 and 2000–01 seasons and led Omonia to two titles.

=== Revival (2000s) ===
After a disappointing eight seasons, the 2000s decade began with a trophy. Omonia celebrated its 18th Cypriot league championship title in 2001. Now captained by Costas Kaiafas, Omonia would win its 19th Cypriot League Championship again in 2003. Since 2003, however, the team would stumble and be without a title for the next several years. After numerous seasons of poor signings and underachieving, Omonia's reigns would be taken over by new chairman and team president, Miltiadis Neophytou in 2008.

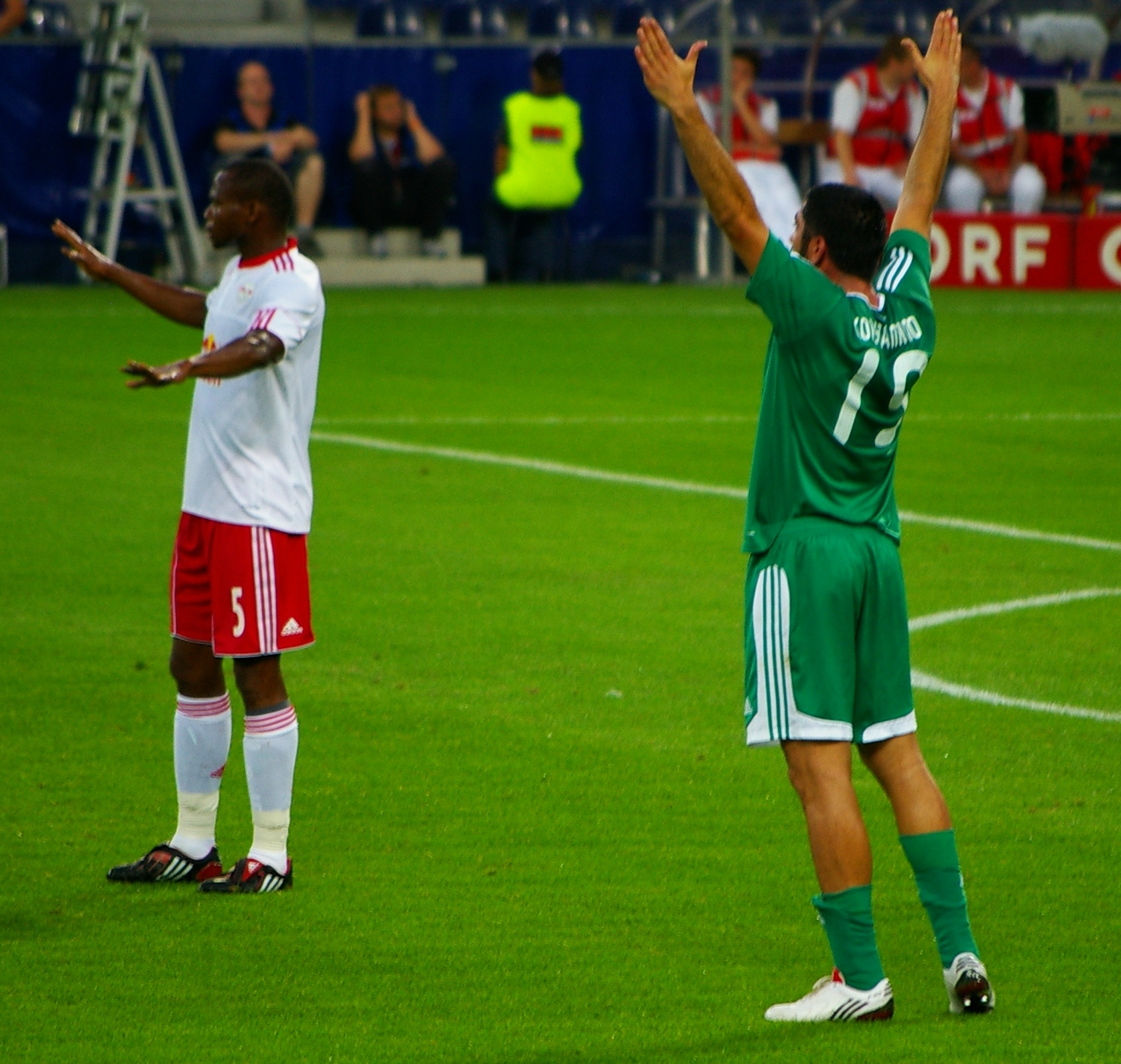
Michalis Konstantinou, mostly credited for helping the team reach its 20th championship title.

The team would soon be put back on track starting in 2006, beginning with the signing of Cyprus international goalkeeper Antonis Georgallides. Omonia would continue its star-studded signings by acquiring Cypriot stars that had been playing abroad, such as Elias Charalambous and Stathis Aloneftis. Omonia would then make headlines with the shocking signing of all-time leading scorer for Cyprus, Michalis Konstantinou. In 2009, Omonia would also sign another Cypriot star, Konstantinos Makrides. En route, Omonia would also acquire young Cypriot hopefuls, 21-year-old Dimitris Christofi and 20-year-old Georgios Efrem. Efrem, who had been playing on the youth team of Arsenal and later Scottish side Rangers, would be the final piece to the puzzle needed to win its 20th Cypriot league championship. After putting the proper pieces in place, Omonia did just that. During the 2009–10 season, led by the new captain, Elias Charalambous, Omonia would not lose a single derby, including play-off matches against APOEL, Anorthosis and Apollon.

Head coach Takis Lemonis left the club after disappointing results and Dušan Bajević became the new coach in October 2010, but was fired in April 2011. He was replaced by Neophytos Larkou. Omonia would not be able to repeat as Champion during the 2010–11 regular season, and instead had to settle with finishing second, despite the addition of yet another young Cypriot rising star, Andreas Avraam. The club, however, was able to finish the season on a positive note: under Larkou, Omonia defeated Apollon Limassol in the Cypriot Cup final to win their 13th cup title.

The following season, Omonia won their 14th cup starring André Alves, who scored the winning goal against AEL Limassol in the final. Under the guidance of newly appointed director of football Nickolas Danskalou, Omonia finished third in the league, all but assuring they would qualify for the second round of the 2012–13 UEFA Europa League.

=== Financial crisis (2012–2018) ===
Head coach Neophytos Larkou left the club in September 2012 and Toni Savevski was then appointed as coach. The team began the season with a great win but found its second success after several games. A disappointing first round proved enough to exclude the club from contesting for the championship or the cup. The team managed better results in the second round, finishing the season in third place. Thousands of fans answered the president's call to donate as much as they could and the financial issues of the club improved. Omonia was knocked out in the semi-finals of the cup by AEL Limassol.

In 2013, Omonia began the new season with Savevski as manager, but he was sacked halfway beside positive results. Miguel Ángel Lotina was hired as the replacement, but was sacked just 37 days later. Kostas Kaiafas, ex-player was then appointed as the new coach. The club's financial difficulties returned despite the massive fundraiser organized the previous season. Omonia finished fifth in the league, making it its worst season in 56 years.

In August 2014, Omonia was knocked out of the Europa League by Dynamo Moscow, in the play-off round. The club issued a complaint to UEFA regarding the refereeing of the match by Alexandru Tudor. In early September, the club stopped supplying the fans' group Gate 9 with tickets resulting in the group's abstention from matches. Two weeks later, after a meeting between the president and the coach, it was decided that tickets were to be supplied again to Gate 9. Omonia finished fourth in the league. The team was eliminated from the Cypriot Cup in the semi-finals by APOEL.

The team ended the 2015–16 campaign in 4th place. During this season, Omonia reached the final of the Cypriot Cup but lost to Apollon Limassol. The 2016–17 season saw the club finish 5th. This meant that for the first time in 15 years the club had failed to qualify for European football. Following a general assembly at the end of the season, Antonis Tzionis was elected as the new club president. While the 2017–18 campaign began with high expectations, Omonia finished the season in 6th place. This season was the worst in the club's history, in terms of defeats and goals conceded. Despite this, the club sold a total of 95,222 tickets during the season, more than any other team in the league.

=== Papastavrou era (2018–present) ===
The decline of the club's football department and the financial difficulties it faced convinced many that a change in the way the club was being run was needed. In May 2018, a general assembly was called and members voted to hand the football department over to Stavros Papastavrou, an American-based Cypriot businessman. He has stated that he will provide funds for the development of the club's academies and training grounds, and that the potential creation of a new stadium will be considered. The agreement, initially set for 10 years, was extended indefinitely in 2023. In the club's first season under Papastavrou's ownership, Omonia finished the 2018–19 campaign in 6th place. Manager Yannis Anastasiou was replaced by Henning Berg in June 2019.

The 2019–20 Cypriot season was abandoned in March 2020 due to the COVID-19 pandemic. At the time of its abandonment, Omonia was tied with Anorthosis Famagusta on points, but was ranked first due to a better head-to-head record and thus qualified for the first qualifying round of the 2020–21 UEFA Champions League.

AC Omonoia's 2020–21 UEFA Europa League starting line-up in the club's first ever winning game at a group stage level against PAOK with final score 2-1.

The following season, a penalty shootout win over Red Star Belgrade meant that the club had qualified for the group stage of a European Competition for the first time in its history. Omonia finished fourth in Group E of the 2020–21 Europa League. In the home game against PSV Eindhoven, Omonia captain Jordi Gómez scored from a distance of 56 metres, breaking the record for the furthest distance ever for a goal scored in the Europa League. In May 2021, Omonia ended the season by winning the Cypriot League for the 21st time, and for the first time since 2010.

In the 2021–22 and 2022–23 seasons, the team struggled in the domestic league, however, managerial changes in the second half of each season (Neil Lennon in 2021–22 and Sofronis Avgousti in 2022–23) were able to inspire back-to-back Cup wins. At the European level, Omonia participated in the group stages of the 2021–22 Conference League and the 2022–23 Europa League, in which they put really close fights against the likes of Manchester United and Real Sociedad.

A turbulent 2023–24 campaign, which included the hiring and firing of a sporting director and the sacking of two coaches, concluded without domestic or European success for Omonia. Giannis Anastasiou and Valdas Dambrauskas were appointed as football advisor and head coach ahead of the 2024–25 season, respectively. Valdas Dambrauskas left the club in November 2024. Giannis Anastasiou was interim coach until the end of the season.

He was replaced by the same person he was replaced in his first term, Henning Berg ahead of the 2025–26 season. After a very successful transfer window and academy recruitment, Berg won his second league title and 22nd overall for the club. Omonoia also played in the 2025–26 Conference League, in which they were eliminated in the knockout playoffs against Rijeka.

== Club identity ==
=== Name ===
"Omonia" (Ομόνοια) is the Greek-language word for harmony, unity, or concord.

=== Colours and badge ===
Omonia's club colours are green and white. The green color indicates hope while white indicates happiness. Omonia's badge has a green shamrock in a white circle. Omonia tends to use a red alternative kit.

=== Anthem ===
Omonia's official anthem was written by Costas Melides in 1971, and recorded by Giannis Avraamides in 1972, in Athens. The lyrics of the anthem reference Omonia's competitive spirit ("Lions in defense, cannons in attack", Greek: "Στην άμυνα λιοντάρια, επίθεση κανόνια"), the club's left-wing roots ("the people's team", Greek: "Του λαού ομάδα"), and the loyalty of the team's supporters, regardless of its results ("In every match, thousands of your loyal fans", Greek: "Σε κάθε σου αγώνα, χιλιάδες οι πιστοί σου οπαδοί").

=== Supporters ===
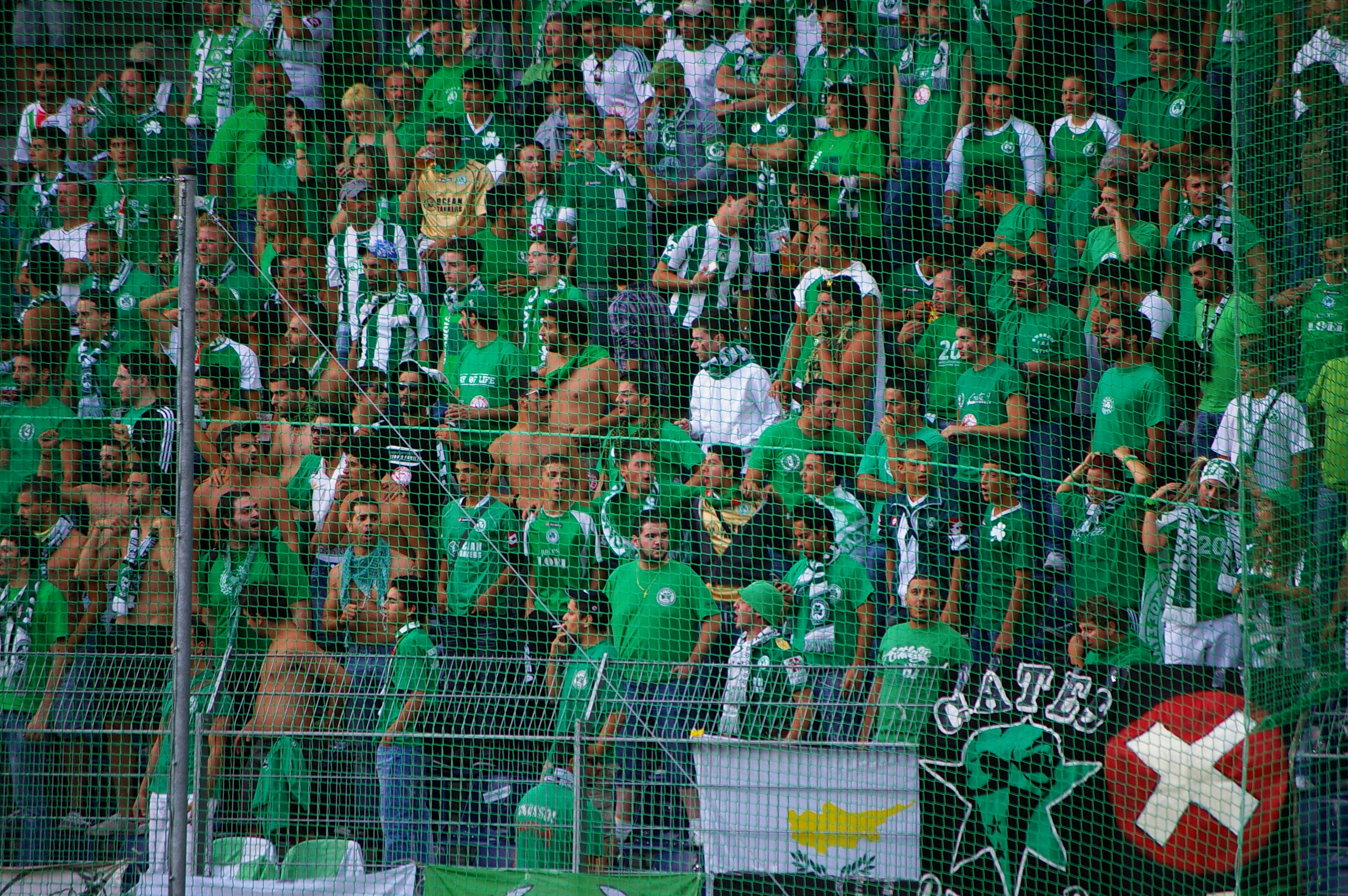
Supporters of Omonia Nicosia at an away match vs. Red Bull Salzburg in 2010

Historically, Omonia has been the most popular team in Cyprus since the creation of the club. A 2022 study conducted by the University of Nicosia found Omonia to be the most popular team on the island by far, with 30.7% of the approximately 1500 participants stating they support the club.

Omonia holds the record for the most league tickets sold by a Cypriot team in a 32-game season (162,061 during the 2009–10 campaign). The club also holds the Cypriot record for the highest average attendance in a season (11,003 during the 2003–04 campaign).

=== Left-wing politics ===
Omonoia Nicosia was created in 1948 by left-wing players forced out of other teams in Cyprus after refusing to sign a pledge denouncing the Greek left during the Greek Civil War. That identity stuck with the team throughout its history, and Omonia supporters are known for their left-leaning, socialist character, with many stating that they associate themselves with the Progressive Party of Working People. Omonia is also traditionally regarded as the club of "the people" and Cyprus' working class. Many of Omonia's supporters can be seen waving banners bearing Che Guevara's image.

==== Financial crisis and 2013 Pan-Cypriot fundraiser ====
By the end of February 2013, Omonia was struggling to meet the UEFA criteria due to the economic crisis that had engulfed the club. The club's president then decided to start a fundraiser and called for the supporters of the club to donate as much as they could. Hundreds of events were organised island wide with the motto; "ΕΙΜΑΙ ΟΜΟΝΟΙΑ ΔΗΛΩΝΩ ΠΑΡΩΝ" meaning, "I'M WITH OMONIA, I DECLARE MYSELF PRESENT." Current and former players contributed by signing autographs and selling club merchandise. Although the situation at the beginning was described as grim, money poured in from all over the island and from abroad including England and the United States. In about a month and a half, €3.5 million was collected from the club's supporters.

On 29 May 2018, the club agreed to turn its football department into a for-profit company, under the ownership of Stavros Papastavrou. Gate 9 had previously condemned the idea and published several statements criticising it. On the same day, Gate 9 declared they would no longer support the team, and announced they would create their own football club, which would "respect the principles and history of Omonia". People's Athletic Club Omonia 29M was founded on 23 July 2018 and currently plays in the Cypriot First Division.

== Media presence ==
OMONOIA TV is the club's official television channel, established in 2024 as the first dedicated sports club TV channel in Cyprus. It provides various club-related content, including live broadcasts of the football team's friendly matches, replays of past matches, exclusive interviews, documentaries and news bulletins. OMONOIA TV is not be confused with OFC TV, the football team's official YouTube channel. OFC TV is the most subscribed YouTube channel for a sports team in Cyprus, and features content such as match highlights, training sessions, and press conferences.

== Stadium ==
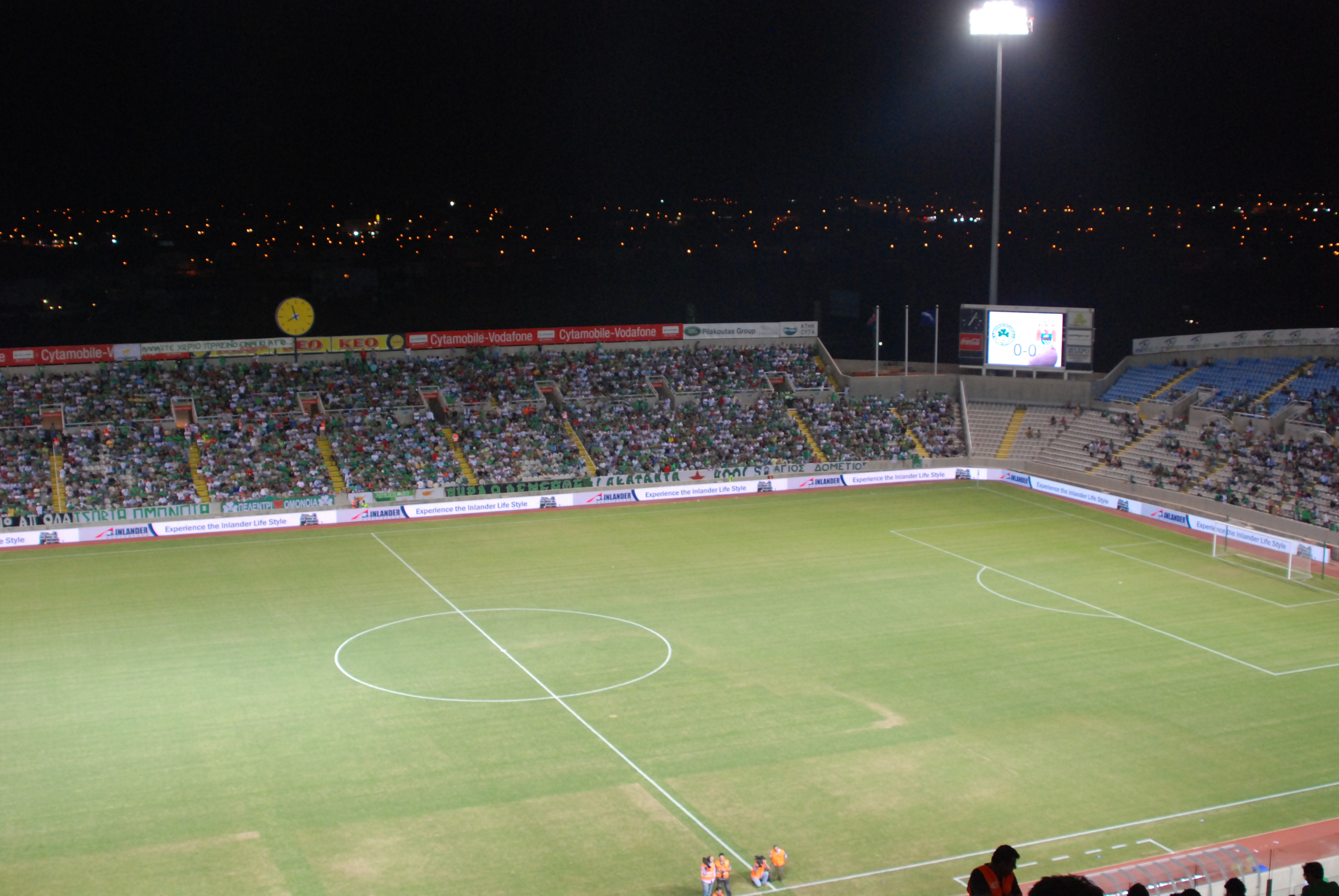
Omonia's current stadium, New GSP Stadium

Since 23 October 1999, Omonia has been using the 22,859-seat New GSP Stadium, the largest stadium in Cyprus. They share and rent the stadium with local rival APOEL.

Initially, the team played at the Goal Stadium from 1948 to 1953. After joining the Cyprus Football Association, Omonia moved to the old GSP Stadium in 1953, and then to the Makario Stadium in 1978, where they played until 1999.

=== Plans for the construction of a privately owned stadium ===
The club had initiated the creation of a stadium in Mia Milia in 1971, but plans were abandoned after the Turkish invasion of Cyprus in 1974. In 2003, the club purchased a piece of land in Nicosia with the aim of building a stadium, however the property was given to the Bank of Cyprus due to debts of the owner company.

In August 2024, having previously spoken about his intention to do so, Omonia FC owner Stavros Papastavrou announced that a new privately owned stadium will be built for the club. The stadium will be located in Tseri, it will have a capacity of 16,000 seats, is expected to be ready for use in the 2028–29 season and along with surrounding premises will cost approximately 60-70 million Euros.

== Kit manufacturers and shirt sponsors ==
Period	Kit manufacturer	Shirt partner
1992–1994	Umbro	Lois
1994–1998	Diadora	KEO
1998–1999	Kappa	KEO
1999–2001	Umbro	KEO
2001–2004	Umbro	LOEL
2004–2007	Lotto	LOEL juices
2007–2008	Lotto	miVision
2008–2010	Lotto	Ocean Tankers
2010–2012	Adidas	CYTAmobile-Vodafone
2012–2016	Nike	CYTAmobile-Vodafone
2016–2017	Puma	Gree
2017–2018	Puma	DIMCO
2018–2019	Puma	Fonbet
2019–2021	Macron	Fonbet
2021–2023	Macron	Stoiximan
2023–2026	Macron	Novibet
2026–	Adidas	Stoiximan

== Honours ==
AC Omonia honours
Type	Competition	Titles	Seasons	Ref.
Domestic	Cypriot First Division	22	1960–61, 1965–66, 1971–72, 1973–74, 1974–75, 1975–76, 1976–77, 1977–78, 1978–79, 1980–81, 1981–82, 1982–83, 1983–84, 1984–85, 1986–87, 1988–89, 1992–93, 2000–01, 2002–03, 2009–10, 2020–21, 2025–26	
Domestic	Cypriot Cup	16	1964–65, 1971–72, 1973–74, 1979–80, 1980–81, 1981–82, 1982–83, 1987–88, 1990–91, 1993–94,1999–2000, 2004–05, 2010–11, 2011–12, 2021–22, 2022–23	
Domestic	Cypriot Super Cup	17	1966, 1979, 1980, 1981, 1982, 1983, 1987, 1988, 1989,1991, 1994, 2001, 2003, 2005, 2010, 2012, 2021	

- record

=== Minor Titles ===
- CAFF Championship
  - Winners (4) (record): 1948–49, 1949–50, 1950–51, 1951–52
- CAFF Cup
  - Winners (5) (record): 1948–49, 1949–50, 1950–51, 1951–52, 1952–53

== Player records ==
All current players are listed in bold

As of match played 05 November 2026

**Most appearances**

Rank	Player	Apps	Years
1	(Cyprus) Andreas Kanaris	503	1968–1985
2	(Cyprus) Kostas Kaiafas	498	1991–2009
3	(Cyprus) Andreas Kantilos	489	1980–1997
4	(Cyprus) Sotiris Kaiafas	476	1967–1984
5	(Cyprus) Evagoras Christofi	463	1979–1996
6	(Cyprus) Sotiris Tsikkos	427	1974–1990
7	(Cyprus) Takis Mavris	417	1974–1988
8	(Cyprus) Sakis Andreou	372	1986–2000
9	(Cyprus) Andreas Charitou	369	1981–1999
10	(Cyprus) Yiannos Kalotheou	353	1984–1999
10	(Cyprus) Panikos Xiouroupas	353	1986–1998

**Top goalscorers**

Rank	Player	Goals
1	(Cyprus) Sotiris Kaiafas	321
2	(Cyprus) Rainer Rauffmann	233
3	(Cyprus) Andreas Kanaris	190
4	(Cyprus) Panikos Xiouroupas	159
5	(Cyprus) Andreas Kantilos	152
6	(Cyprus) Giorgos Savvidis	120
7	(Cyprus) Evagoras Christofi	108
8	(Cyprus) Takis Mavris	86
8	(Cyprus) Gregory Savva	86
10	(Cyprus) Kokos Christofi	84

**Most appearances in UEFA competitions**

Rank	Player	Apps
1	**(Cyprus) Fabiano Freitas**	60
2	**(Cyprus) Andronikos Kakoullis**	51
3	(Cyprus) Loizos Loizou	41
3	(Cyprus) Ioannis Kousoulos	41
5	(Cyprus) Kostas Kaiafas	40
5	(Cyprus) Nikolas Panayiotou	40
7	(Mali) **Senou Coulibaly**	36
8	(Hungary) Adam Lang	35
9	(Cyprus) Andreas Kantilos	34
9	(Bosnia and Herzegovina) **Mateo Marić**	34

**Top scorers in UEFA competitions**

Rank	Player	Goals	Apps
1	(Cyprus) Rainer Rauffmann	11	16
2	(Cape Verde) Willy Semedo	11	29
3	**(Cyprus) Andronikos Kakoullis**	11	51
4	(Cyprus) Andreas Kantilos	7	34
5	(Ukraine) Roman Bezus	6	10
5	(Montenegro) Stevan Jovetić	6	11
7	(Cyprus) Sotiris Kaiafas	6	20
7	(Cyprus) Giorgos Savvidis	6	20
9	(Cyprus) Filippos Dimitriou	6	22
10	(Cyprus) Kostas Kaiafas	6	40

== Record in European competitions ==
=== Overall record ===
As of match played 15 October 2026

Competition	Played	Won	Drawn	Lost	Goals for	Goals against	Latest participation
UEFA Champions League	57	19	8	30	67	112	2026–27
UEFA Europa League	95	37	20	36	142	121	2026–27
UEFA Cup Winners' Cup	12	2	1	9	7	23	1994–95
UEFA Conference League	38	17	8	13	58	40	2025–26
Total	201	76	37	88	272	297	2026–27

=== European Cup / UEFA Champions League ===
European Cup / UEFA Champions League
Season	Round	Opponent	Home	Away	Agg.
1966–67	First round	(Germany) 1860 Munich	1–2	0–8	1–10
1972–73	First round	(Republic of Ireland) Waterford United	2–0	1–2	3–2
1972–73	Second round	(Germany) Bayern Munich	0–4	0–9	0–13
1974–75	First round	(Republic of Ireland) Cork Celtic			(w/o)
1975–76	First round	(Iceland) IA Akranes	2–1	0–4	2–5
1976–77	First round	(Greece) PAOK	0–2	1–1	1–3
1977–78	First round	(Italy) Juventus	0–3	0–2	0–5
1978–79	First round	(Republic of Ireland) Bohemians	2–1	0–1	2–2 (a)
1979–80	First round	(Luxembourg) Red Boys Differdange	6–1	2–1	8–2
1979–80	Second round	(Netherlands) Ajax	4–0	0–10	4–10
1981–82	First round	(Portugal) Benfica	0–1	0–3	0–4
1982–83	First round	(Finland) HJK Helsinki	2–0	0–3	2–3
1983–84	First round	(Bulgaria) CSKA Sofia	4–1	0–3	4–4 (a)
1984–85	First round	(Romania) Dinamo București	2–1	1–4	3–5
1985–86	First round	(Malta) Rabat Ajax	5–0	5–0	10–0
1985–86	Second round	(Belgium) Anderlecht	1–3	0–1	1–4
1987–88	First round	(Republic of Ireland) Shamrock Rovers	0–0	1–0	1–0
1987–88	Second round	(Romania) Steaua București	0–2	1–3	1–5
1989–90	First round	(Austria) Swarovski Tirol	2–3	0–6	2–9
1993–94	Preliminary round	(Switzerland) Aarau	2–1	0–2	2–3
2001–02	Second qualifying round	(Serbia) Red Star Belgrade	1–1	1–2	2–3
2003–04	First qualifying round	(Kazakhstan) Irtysh	0–0	2–1	2–1
2003–04	Second qualifying round	(Poland) Wisła Kraków	2–2	2–5	4–7
2010–11	Second qualifying round	(North Macedonia) Renova	3–0	2–0	5–0
2010–11	Third qualifying round	(Austria) Red Bull Salzburg	1–1	1–4	2–5
2020–21	First qualifying round	Ararat-Armenia	—N/a	1–0 (a.e.t.)	—N/a
2020–21	Second qualifying round	(Poland) Legia Warsaw	—N/a	2–0 (a.e.t.)	—N/a
2020–21	Third qualifying round	(Serbia) Red Star Belgrade	1–1 (a.e.t.) (4–2 p)	—N/a	—N/a
2020–21	Play-off round	(Greece) Olympiacos	0–0	0–2	0–2
2021–22	Second qualifying round	(Croatia) Dinamo Zagreb	0–1	0–2	0−3
2026–27	Second qualifying round	(Kazakhstan) Kairat	1–0	0–1 (a.e.t.)	1–1 (5–6 p)

=== European Cup Winners' Cup ===
European Cup Winners' Cup
Season	Round	Opponent	Home	Away	Agg.
1965–66	First qualifying round	(Greece) Olympiacos	0–1	1–1	1–2
1980–81	First qualifying round	(Belgium) Waterschei Thor	1–3	0–4	1–7
1988–89	First qualifying round	(Greece) Panathinaikos	0–1	0–2	0–3
1991–92	First qualifying round	(Belgium) Club Brugge	0–2	0–2	0–4
1994–95	Qualifying round	(Moldova) Tiligul Tiraspol	3–1	1–0	4–1
1994–95	First round	(England) Arsenal	1–3	0–3	1–6

=== UEFA Cup / UEFA Europa League ===
UEFA Cup / UEFA Europa League
Season	Round	Opponent	Home	Away	Agg.
1986–87	First round	Sportul Studențesc	1–1	0–1	1–2
1990–91	First round	Slavia Sofia	4–2	1–2	5–4
1990–91	Second round	(Belgium) Anderlecht	1–1	0–3	1–4
1995–96	Preliminary round	(Malta) Sliema Wanderers	3–0	2–1	5–1
1995–96	First round	(Italy) Lazio	1–2	0–5	1–7
1998–99	First qualifying round	(Northern Ireland) Linfield	5–1	3–5	8–6
1998–99	Second qualifying round	(Austria) Rapid Wien	3–1	0–2	3–3 (a)
1999–2000	Qualifying round	(Belarus) Belshina Bobruisk	3–0	5–1	8–1
1999–2000	First round	(Italy) Juventus	2–5	0–5	2–10
2000–01	Qualifying round	(Bulgaria) Naftex Burgas	0–0	1–2	1–2
2004–05	First Qualifying round	(North Macedonia) Sloga Jugomagnat	4–0	4–1	8–1
2004–05	Second qualifying round	(Bulgaria) CSKA Sofia	1–1	1–3	2–4
2005–06	First qualifying round	(Malta) Hibernians	3–0	3–0	6–0
2005–06	Second qualifying round	(Romania) Dinamo București	2–1	1–3	3–4
2006–07	First qualifying round	(Croatia) Rijeka	2–1	2–2	4–3
2006–07	Second qualifying round	(Bulgaria) Litex Lovech	0–0	1–2	1–2
2007–08	First qualifying round	(Montenegro) Rudar Pljevlja	2–0	2–0	4–0
2007–08	Second qualifying round	(Bulgaria) CSKA Sofia	1–1	1–2	2–3
2008–09	First qualifying round	(North Macedonia) Milano	2–0	2–1	4–1
2008–09	Second qualifying round	(Greece) AEK Athens	2–2	1–0	3–2
2008–09	First round	(England) Manchester City	1–2	1–2	2–4
2009–10	Second qualifying round	(Faroe Islands) HB	4–0	4–1	8–1
2009–10	Third qualifying round	(Romania) Vaslui	1–1	0–2	1–3
2010–11	Play-off round	(Ukraine) Metalist Kharkiv	0–1	2–2	2–3
2011–12	Third qualifying round	(Netherlands) ADO Den Haag	3–0	0–1	3–1
2011–12	Play-off round	(Austria) Red Bull Salzburg	2–1	0–1	2–2 (a)
2012–13	Third qualifying round	(Serbia) Red Star Belgrade	0–0 (a.e.t.)	0–0	0–0 (5–6 p)
2013–14	Second qualifying round	(Romania) Astra Giurgiu	1–2	1–1	2–3
2014–15	Second qualifying round	(Montenegro) Budućnost Podgorica	0–0	2–0	2–0
2014–15	Third qualifying round	(North Macedonia) Metalurg Skopje	3–0	1–0	4–0
2014–15	Play-off round	(Russia) Dynamo Moscow	1–2	2–2	3–4
2015–16	First qualifying round	(Georgia (country)) Dinamo Batumi	2–0	0–1	2–1
2015–16	Second qualifying round	(Poland) Jagiellonia Białystok	1–0	0–0	1–0
2015–16	Third qualifying round	(Denmark) Brøndby	2–2	0–0	2–2 (a)
2016–17	First qualifying round	(Armenia) Banants	4–1	1–0	5–1
2016–17	Second qualifying round	(Israel) Beitar Jerusalem	3–2	0–1	3–3 (a)
2020–21	Group E	(Netherlands) PSV Eindhoven	1–2	0–4	4th
2020–21	Group E	(Greece) PAOK	2–1	1–1	4th
2020–21	Group E	(Spain) Granada	0–2	1–2	4th
2021–22	Third qualifying round	(Estonia) Flora	1–0	1–2 (a.e.t.)	2–2 (5–4 p)
2021–22	Play-off round	(Belgium) Antwerp	4–2	0–2 (a.e.t.)	4–4 (2–3 p)
2022–23	Play-off round	(Belgium) Gent	2–0	2–0	4–0
2022–23	Group E	(England) Manchester United	2–3	0–1	4th
2022–23	Group E	(Spain) Real Sociedad	0–2	1–2	4th
2022–23	Group E	(Moldova) Sheriff Tiraspol	0–3	0–1	4th
2026–27	Third qualifying round	(Gibraltar) Lincoln Red Imps	1–0	1–1	2–1
2026–27	Play-off round	(Belgium) Sint-Truiden	4–2	0–1	4–3
2026–27	League phase	(Portugal) Benfica	1–4	—N/a	TBD
2026–27	League phase	(Italy) Juventus	—N/a		TBD
2026–27	League phase	(Scotland) Celtic		—N/a	TBD
2026–27	League phase	(France) Rennes	—N/a		TBD
2026–27	League phase	(Spain) Celta Vigo	1–0	—N/a	TBD
2026–27	League phase	(Slovenia) Celje	—N/a	3–0	TBD
2026–27	League phase	(Turkey) Beşiktaş		—N/a	TBD
2026–27	League phase	(Netherlands) NEC	—N/a		TBD

=== UEFA Conference League ===
UEFA Conference League
Season	Round	Opponent	Home	Away	Agg.
2021–22	Group H	(Switzerland) Basel	1–1	1–3	3rd
2021–22	Group H	(Azerbaijan) Qarabağ	1–4	2–2	3rd
2021–22	Group H	(Kazakhstan) Kairat	0–0	0–0	3rd
2023–24	Second qualifying round	(Azerbaijan) Gabala	4–1	3–2	7–3
2023–24	Third qualifying round	(Denmark) Midtjylland	1–0	1–5	2–5
2024–25	Second qualifying round	(Georgia (country)) Torpedo Kutaisi	3–1	2–1	5–2
2024–25	Third qualifying round	(Hungary) Fehérvár	1–0	2–0	3–0
2024–25	Play-off round	(Azerbaijan) Zira	6–0	0–1	6–1
2024–25	League phase	(Iceland) Víkingur	4–0	—N/a	22nd
2024–25	League phase	(Scotland) Heart of Midlothian	—N/a	0–2	22nd
2024–25	League phase	(Belgium) Gent	—N/a	0–1	22nd
2024–25	League phase	(Poland) Legia Warsaw	0–3	—N/a	22nd
2024–25	League phase	(Austria) Rapid Wien	3–1	—N/a	22nd
2024–25	League phase	(Bosnia and Herzegovina) Borac Banja Luka	—N/a	0–0	22nd
2024–25	Knockout phase play-offs	(Cyprus) Pafos	1–1	1–2	2–3
2025–26	Second qualifying round	(Georgia (country)) Torpedo Kutaisi	1–0	4–0	5–0
2025–26	Third qualifying round	(Azerbaijan) Araz-Naxçıvan	5–0	4–0	9–0
2025–26	Play-off round	(Austria) Wolfsberger AC	1–0 (a.e.t.)	1–2	2–2 (5–4 p)
2025–26	League phase	(Germany) Mainz 05	0–1	—N/a	18th
2025–26	League phase	(Kosovo) Drita	—N/a	1–1	18th
2025–26	League phase	(Switzerland) Lausanne-Sport	—N/a	1–1	18th
2025–26	League phase	(Ukraine) Dynamo Kyiv	2–0	—N/a	18th
2025–26	League phase	(Austria) Rapid Wien	—N/a	1–0	18th
2025–26	League phase	(Poland) Raków Częstochowa	0–1	—N/a	18th
2025–26	Knockout phase play-offs	(Croatia) Rijeka	0–1	1–3	1–4

=== UEFA and IFFHS rankings ===
UEFA Club coefficient ranking

Rank	Country	Team	Points
103	(Italy)	Como	17.574
104	(Germany)	Mainz 05	17.500
105	(Cyprus)	Omonia	17.250
106	(Republic of Ireland)	Shamrock Rovers	16.875
107	(France)	Brest	16.750

Last updated: 28 August 2026

Source: UEFA

IFFHS Club World ranking

Rank	Country	Team	Points
120	(Japan)	Sanfrecce Hiroshima	141
121	(Greece)	AEK Athens	139,5
122	(Cyprus)	Omonia	139
123	(Chile)	Universidad de Chile	138.25
124	(Brazil)	Vitória	138

Last updated: 10 February 2026

Source: IFFHS

== Players ==
=== Current squad ===
As of 11 September 2026

Note: Flags indicate national team as defined under FIFA eligibility rules; some limited exceptions apply. Players may hold more than one non-FIFA nationality.

No.	Pos.	Nation	Player
1	GK	BEL	Thomas Kaminski (on loan from Charlton Athletic)
3	DF	GRE	Fotis Kitsos
5	DF	MLI	Senou Coulibaly (vice captain)
6	MF	NED	Carel Eiting
7	FW	SUR	Jaden Montnor
8	FW	NGR	David Akintola
9	FW	CYP	Andronikos Kakoullis
11	MF	BRA	Ewandro
14	MF	BIH	Mateo Marić
17	FW	ROU	Florin Tănase
20	MF	NED	Luuk Brouwers
21	FW	RSA	Mihlali Mayambela
22	MF	SWE	Muamer Tanković
27	DF	CZE	Stefan Simić

No.	Pos.	Nation	Player
28	DF	ENG	Moses Odubajo
29	DF	SLO	Jure Balkovec
37	DF	SVK	Ľubomír Šatka
40	GK	CYP	Fabiano (captain)
44	DF	CYP	Giorgos Victoros (on loan from Nea Salamina)
74	MF	CYP	Panagiotis Andreou
77	DF	HUN	Loïc Négo
78	GK	CYP	Pantelis Michael
82	MF	CYP	Andreas Christou
85	FW	CYP	Angelos Neophytou
90	DF	CYP	Christos Constantinides
93	DF	HAI	Jean-Kévin Duverne
99	FW	FRA	Loïs Diony

==== Out on loan ====
Note: Flags indicate national team as defined under FIFA eligibility rules; some limited exceptions apply. Players may hold more than one non-FIFA nationality.

No.	Pos.	Nation	Player
—	DF	CYP	Andreas Hadjievangelou (at Spartakos Kitiou until 31 May 2027)
—	MF	CYP	Gavriel Psilogenis (at MEAP Nisou until 31 May 2027)
—	FW	CYP	Constantinos Panayi (at ASIL Lysi until 31 May 2027)

No.	Pos.	Nation	Player
—	FW	CYP	Chrysis Evangelou (at Nea Salamina until 31 May 2027)
—	FW	GAB	Curtis Junior Makosso (at Omonia Aradippou until 31 May 2027)

=== Former players ===
For details of former players, see Category:AC Omonia players

=== Retired number ===
12 – The club's supporters (the 12th man)

== Staff ==
=== Technical staff ===
Head coach	(Norway) Henning Berg
Team coordinator	(Cyprus) Simos Tarapoulouzis
Assistant coaches	(Venezuela) Héctor González
Assistant coaches	(Norway) Tomasz Sokolowski
Goalkeeping coach	(Cyprus) Andreas Lougrides
Physical fitness coaches	(Cyprus) Savvas Lithraggomitis
Physical fitness coaches	(Cyprus) Giorgos Georgiou
Physical fitness coaches	(Cyprus) Athanasios Aggeli
Football analyst	(Cyprus) Kyriakos Televantos
Assistant football analyst	(Cyprus) Sergios Kyzas

=== Staff ===
Team Manager	(Cyprus) Isavella Panaretou
Doctor	(Cyprus) Andreas Petrou
Head of Physiotherapist	(Bulgaria) Georgi Gospodinov
Physiotherapists	(Cyprus) Marios Paraskeva
Physiotherapists	(Cyprus) Vouniotis Andreas
Chiropractor	(Cyprus) Stavros Stavrou
Masseur	(Cyprus) Elias Christofides
Νutritionist	(Cyprus) Glykeria Giakoumou
Psychologist	(Cyprus) Adamos Papantoniou
Chief Scout	(Norway) Tor-Kristian Karlsen
Scouter	(Cyprus) Odysseas Odysseos
Plant Administrator	(Cyprus) Andreas Papastavrou
Head of Caregivers	(Cyprus) Giorgos Hadjievaggelou
Caregiver	(Cyprus) Thanasis Risvanis
Foremans	(India) Jovan Preet Singh
Foremans	(India) Parneet Kaur Sandhu

Source: omonoiafc.com.cy

== Management ==
=== AC Omonia ===
Position	Name
President	(Cyprus) Marios Argyrides
Vice President A'	(Cyprus) Antonis Zymaras
Vice President B'	(Cyprus) Costas Vasileiou
General Secretary	(Cyprus) Christodoulos Kountouris
General Secretary B'	(Cyprus) Nikolas Philotheou
Head of Finance	(Cyprus) Sokratis Efstratiou
Member	(Cyprus) Gianna Argyrou
Member	(Cyprus) Christos Lambrou
Member	(Cyprus) Polys Poumpouris
Member	(Cyprus) Nikolas Michaelides
Member	(Cyprus) Andreas Charitou
Member	(Cyprus) Nasos Koukos
Member	(Cyprus) Iraklis Panteli
Member	(Cyprus) Christoforos Christoforou
Member	(Cyprus) Constantinos Christofi

Source: Ομόνοια: Καταρτίστηκε σε Σώμα το Δ.Σ. του Σωματείου

=== Omonia FC ===
Position	Name
President	(Cyprus) Stavros Papastavrou
Member	(Cyprus) Marios Argyrides
Member	(Cyprus) Christodoulos Kountouris
Member	(Cyprus) Nikolas Georgiades
Member	(Cyprus) Polys Malloupas
Member	(Cyprus) Michel Lantas
Member	(Cyprus) Neophytos Stylianou
Member	(Cyprus) Pavlos Fokas

Source: omonoiafc.com.cy

=== Managerial history ===
- (Cyprus) Dikran Missirian (1948–52)
- (England) John Johnson (1952–53)
- (Cyprus) Pambos Avraamidis (1953–55)
- (West Germany) Hans Hungehuisen (1955–57)
- (West Germany) Karl Vogler (1957–59)
- (Israel) Eli Fuchs (1959–60)
- (Bulgaria) Nako Chakmakov (1960–62)
- (Hungary) András Turay (1962–63)
- (Bulgaria) Stoyan Petrov (1963–64)
- (Cyprus) Andreas Keremezos (1964–65)
- (Bulgaria) Georgi Pachedzhiev (1965–66), first term
- (Soviet Union) Igor Netto (1966–67)
- (Bulgaria) Georgi Berkov (1967–68)
- (Bulgaria) Georgi Pachedzhiev (1968–70), second term
- (Bulgaria) Khrustyo Chakarov (1970–71)
- (Bulgaria) Dobromir Tashkov (1971–72), first term
- (Bulgaria) Vasil Spasov (1972–74), first term
- (Cyprus) Andreas Constantinou (Esso) 1974–75
- (Bulgaria) Tsvetan Ilchev (1975–76)
- (Bulgaria) Gavril Stoyanov (1976–77)
- (Bulgaria) Petar Argirov (1977–79)
- (Bulgaria) Yoncho Arsov (1979–80), first term
- (Bulgaria) Vasil Spasov (1980–82), second term
- (Bulgaria) Dobromir Tashkov (1982–83), second term
- (Bulgaria) Atanas Dramov (1983–85)
- (Bulgaria) Yanko Dinkov (1985–86)
- (Bulgaria) Yoncho Arsov (1986–89), second term
- (Bulgaria) Bozhil Kolev (1989–90)
- (Austria) Helmut Senekowitsch (1990–91)
- (Brazil) Graziano Zakarel (1991–92)
- (Bulgaria) Yoncho Arsov (1992–94), third term
- (Germany) Gerhard Prokop (1994–96)
- (Austria) Walter Skocik (1995–96)
- (Bulgaria) Angel Kolev (1996–97)
- (Cyprus) Andreas Michaelides (1997–99)
- (Czechoslovakia) Dušan Galis (1999)
- (Bulgaria) Yoncho Arsov (1999–00), fourth term
- (Bulgaria) Asparuh Nikodimov (2000)
- (Netherlands) Arie Haan (14 November 2000 – 30 November 2000)
- (Netherlands) Henk Houwaart (1 October 2000 – 30 November 2001), first term
- (Cyprus) Andreas Mouskallis (2002)
- (North Macedonia) Toni Savevski (2002–04), first term
- (Poland) Franciszek Smuda (2004)
- (Netherlands) Henk Houwaart (1 July 2004 – 21 December 2005), second term
- (Romania) Ioan Andone (28 December 2005 – 25 May 2007)
- (Serbia) Dragan Okuka (23 May 2007 – 26 November 2007)
- (Greece) Ioannis Matzourakis (2007)
- (Cyprus) Giorgos Savvidis (2007–2008)
- (Bosnia and Herzegovina) Nedim Tutić (2008–09)
- (Greece) Takis Lemonis (17 March 2009 – 4 October 2010)
- (Bosnia and Herzegovina) Dušan Bajević (13 October 2010 – 14 April 2011)
- (Cyprus) Neophytos Larkou (15 April 2011 – 18 September 2012)
- (North Macedonia) Toni Savevski (26 September 2012 – 18 December 2013), second term
- (Spain) Miguel Ángel Lotina (1 January 2014 – 6 February 2014)
- (Cyprus) Kostas Kaiafas (12 March 2014 – 2 November 2015)
- (Serbia) Vladan Milojević (11 November 2015 – 18 May 2016)
- (England) John Carver (4 June 2016 – 23 February 2017)
- (Cyprus) Akis Ioakim (23 February 2017 – 26 May 2017)
- (Cyprus) Pambos Christodoulou (26 May 2017 – 5 December 2017)
- (Bulgaria) Ivaylo Petev (14 December 2017 – 21 March 2018)
- (Spain) Juan Carlos Oliva (17 June 2018 – 22 October 2018)
- (Greece) Giannis Anastasiou (1 November 2018 – 21 May 2019), first term
- (Norway) Henning Berg (6 June 2019 – 28 February 2022), first term
- (Northern Ireland) Neil Lennon (7 March 2022 – 18 October 2022)
- (Belgium) Yannick Ferrera (23 October 2022 – 6 February 2023)
- (Cyprus) Sofronis Avgousti (6 February 2023 – 8 January 2024)
- (Norway) Kjetil Rekdal (10 January 2024 – 21 February 2024)
- (Greece) Giannis Anastasiou (21 February 2024 – 30 June 2024), second term (interim)
- (Lithuania) Valdas Dambrauskas (1 July 2024 – 29 November 2024)
- (Greece) Giannis Anastasiou (30 November 2024 – 26 May 2025), third term (interim)
- (Norway) Henning Berg (26 May 2025 –), second term

Source: Trifylli Archived 2 September 2022 at the Wayback Machine (in Greek)

=== Presidential history ===
Name	From	To	Honours
Takis Nikolaidis	1948	1974	4 Cypriot Championship, 3 Cypriot Cup, 1 Cypriot Super Cup, 4 CAFF Championship, 5 CAFF Cup
Kostas Limpouris	1974	1981	6 Cypriot Championship, 2 Cypriot Cup, 2 Cypriot Super Cup
Kostakis Konstantinides	1981	1989	6 Cypriot Championship, 3 Cypriot Cup, 5 Cypriot Super Cup
Panikos Neophytou	1989	1996	1 Cypriot Championship, 2 Cypriot Cup, 3 Cypriot Super Cup
Lakis Polykarpou	1996	2000	1 Cypriot Cup
Doros Seraphim	2000	2008	2 Cypriot Championship, 1 Cypriot Cup, 3 Cypriot Super Cup
Miltiades Neophytou	2008	2012	1 Cypriot Championship, 2 Cypriot Cup, 1 Cypriot Super Cup
Stelios Milonas	2012	2014	1 Cypriot Super Cup
Doros Seraphim	2014	2016	
Antonis Tzionis	2016	2018	
Loris Kyriakou	2018	2020	
Marios Argyrides	2020	Present	2 Cypriot Championship, 2 Cypriot Cup, 1 Cypriot Super Cup
