= Tsaggaris Peledriou =

Cypriot football club

- Founded: 1957
- Ground: Pelendri Community Stadium

Tsaggaris Peledriou is a Cypriot football club based in Pelendri, Cyprus. Founded in 1957 as Sotirios Pelendriou, changed their name to Apollon Pelendriou after they were expelled from the CFA on the category of match-fixing (with ENAZ Agia Zoni Limassol). They changed their name to Tsaggaris Pelendriou at 1984. The team was playing sometimes in Third and in Fourth Division.

== Honours ==
- Cypriot Fourth Division:
  - Champions (1): 1990 (Limassol-Paphos Group)
