= 1992–93 Cypriot First Division =

Cypriot First Division
- Season: 1992–93
- Champions: Omonia (17th title)
- Relegated: Aris; APOP
- Champions League: Omonia (preliminary round)
- UEFA Cup: Apollon (preliminary round)
- Cup Winners' Cup: APOEL (qualifying round; via Cypriot Cup)
- Matches played: 182
- Goals scored: 612 (3.36 per match)
- Top goalscorer: Slađan Šćepović (25 goals)

The 1992–93 Cypriot First Division was the 54th season of the Cypriot top-level football league. Omonia won their 17th title.

== Format ==
Fourteen teams participated in the 1992–93 Cypriot First Division. All teams played against each other twice, once at their home and once away. The team with the most points at the end of the season crowned champions. The last two teams were relegated to the 1993–94 Cypriot Second Division. The 12th-placed team faced the 3rd-placed team of the 1992–93 Cypriot Second Division, in a two-legged relegation play-off for one spot in the 1993–94 Cypriot First Division.

The champions ensured their participation in the 1993–94 UEFA Champions League and the runners-up in the 1993–94 UEFA Cup.

=== Point system ===
Teams received three points for a win, one point for a draw and zero points for a loss.

== Changes from previous season ==
Alki and Omonia Aradippou were relegated from previous season and played in the 1992–93 Cypriot Second Division. They were replaced by the first two teams of the 1991–92 Cypriot Second Division, Ethnikos Achna and APOP Paphos.

== Stadia and locations ==
1992–93 Cypriot First Division

Club	Venue
AEL	Tsirion Stadium
Anorthosis	Antonis Papadopoulos Stadium
APOEL	Makario Stadium
Apollon	Tsirion Stadium
APOP	Pafiako Stadium
Aris	Tsirion Stadium
Ethnikos	Dasaki Stadium
Enosis	Paralimni Municipal Stadium
EPA	GSZ Stadium
Evagoras	Pafiako Stadium
Nea Salamina	Ammochostos Stadium
Olympiakos	GSP Stadium
Omonia	Makario Stadium
Pezoporikos	GSZ Stadium

== League standings ==
Pos	Team	Pld	W	D	L	GF	GA	GD	Pts	Qualification or relegation
1	Omonia (C)	26	18	5	3	75	30	+45	59	Qualification for Champions League preliminary round
2	Apollon	26	17	6	3	66	25	+41	57	Qualification for UEFA Cup preliminary round
3	Nea Salamina	26	15	3	8	44	28	+16	48	
4	APOEL	26	12	7	7	52	39	+13	43	Qualification for Cup Winners' Cup qualifying round
5	Anorthosis	26	11	6	9	32	33	−1	39	
6	Pezoporikos	26	8	10	8	46	39	+7	34	
7	AEL	26	9	6	11	42	40	+2	33	
8	Enosis Neon Paralimni	26	10	3	13	46	48	−2	33	
9	Ethnikos Achna	26	10	3	13	46	49	−3	33	
10	EPA	26	8	8	10	40	48	−8	32	
11	Olympiakos	26	8	7	11	34	52	−18	31	
12	Evagoras (O)	26	8	6	12	39	45	−6	30	Qualification for relegation playoff
13	Aris (R)	26	8	6	12	33	52	−19	30	Relegation to Cypriot Second Division
14	APOP (R)	26	1	2	23	17	84	−67	5	Relegation to Cypriot Second Division

Rules for classification: 1) Points, 2) Goal differences, 3) Goals for.
(C) Champions; (O) Play-off winners; (R) Relegated

== Results ==
Home \ Away	AEL	ANR	APN	APL	APP	ARS	ETH	ENP	EPA	EVG	NSL	OLY	OMN	POL
AEL		4–1	1–3	0–2	4–1	1–2	3–1	5–1	0–0	3–0	0–3	3–1	2–2	3–1
Anorthosis	2–0		2–0	1–0	2–1	0–0	0–1	1–3	1–2	1–0	1–1	1–0	1–1	1–1
APOEL	1–0	1–3		1–1	2–0	2–1	3–2	5–1	2–1	5–2	3–1	4–0	2–2	1–1
Apollon	3–0	1–0	2–2		3–0	5–1	5–2	5–2	3–1	3–2	2–1	5–1	4–4	0–0
APOP	1–4	1–3	1–3	0–8		0–2	0–5	1–4	0–2	1–0	1–2	1–1	1–4	1–1
Aris	0–0	2–3	3–1	0–3	1–0		4–2	1–1	1–1	5–1	0–0	1–3	0–3	2–0
Ethnikos	3–2	3–1	0–1	1–1	2–0	2–0		0–0	5–2	0–0	0–3	5–0	2–4	2–3
Enosis	2–3	3–0	1–0	0–2	6–0	2–4	2–3		2–0	4–1	2–0	3–1	1–0	2–3
EPA	1–1	1–2	2–2	1–4	5–4	2–0	1–0	4–1		1–1	1–0	1–1	0–0	4–3
Evagoras	0–0	3–1	1–1	1–2	4–1	2–2	1–2	1–0	3–0		5–2	1–1	0–1	2–0
Nea Salamina	1–0	1–2	3–1	2–1	2–0	3–1	2–1	2–0	2–0	3–0		3–1	3–1	0–1
Olympiakos	2–2	1–1	3–2	0–0	2–0	1–0	3–1	2–0	3–2	1–4	1–2		1–2	2–1
Omonia	4–0	1–0	3–2	2–0	7–1	10–0	4–0	2–1	4–2	3–1	3–2	5–0		1–0
Pezoporikos	2–1	1–1	2–2	0–1	5–0	4–0	4–1	2–2	3–3	2–3	0–0	2–2	4–2	

Legend: Blue = home team win; Yellow = draw; Red = away team win.

== Relegation play-off ==
The 12th-placed team Evagoras faced the 3rd-placed team of the 1992–93 Cypriot Second Division Alki Larnaca, in a two-legged play-off for one spot in the 1993–94 Cypriot First Division. Evagoras won both matches and secured their place in the 1993–94 Cypriot First Division.

- Evagoras 1–0 Alki
- Alki 0–2 Evagoras

== See also ==
- Cypriot First Division
- 1992–93 Cypriot Cup
- List of top goalscorers in Cypriot First Division by season
- Cypriot football clubs in European competitions

== Sources ==
- "1992/93 Cypriot First Division". Rec.Sport.Soccer Statistics Foundation. 2016-01-14.
