= Cypriot football clubs in European competitions =

Cypriot men’s football teams have participated in UEFA competitions since the 1963–64 season. Before that, the Cyprus Football Association joined UEFA in 1962. Cypriot teams have participated in five European competitions: the European Cup/UEFA Champions League, UEFA Cup/UEFA Europa League, UEFA Cup Winners' Cup, UEFA Intertoto Cup and UEFA Europa Conference League. 16 different Cypriot clubs have participated in at least in one European competition.

In the first few decades of participation, Cypriot teams lost by large margins. Later, results began to improve. In 2006 Ethnikos Achnas became joint winner of the UEFA Intertoto Cup 2006 with 11 other teams and In 2008, a Cypriot team, Anorthosis Famagusta FC, qualified for the group stage of a European competition for the first time. Since then, at least one Cypriot team has participated in the group stage of a European tournament every season. The best performance was the appearance of APOEL FC in the quarter-finals of the 2011–12 UEFA Champions League. APOEL would also make an appearance in the round of 16 of the 2016–17 UEFA Europa League, the second best performance of a Cypriot team in UEFA competitions.

Cyprus' UEFA coefficient at the end of the 2012–13 season was 14th, the highest the country ever achieved.

== European Cup/UEFA Champions League ==
Cypriot teams began participating in the European Cup (renamed the UEFA Champions League in 1992) in 1963. The first team to do so was Anorthosis Famagusta FC against FK Partizan in Belgrade on 11 September 1963.

In this competition only the Cypriot Champions have taken part, except in the 2014–15 season, when, due to Cyprus’ UEFA coefficient ranking, the country had two participants.

Cypriot teams have taken part in the competition every season since 1963 with three exceptions:

- 1964–65 season: The Cyprus championship was abandoned and no team was crowned champion.
- 1974–75 season: As a result of the Turkish invasion of Cyprus, the three teams that qualified for European competitions withdrew. In the European Cup that team was Omonia.
- In the 1994–95 and 1996–97 seasons Cyprus did not receive a Champions League place due to a low country coefficient. The champions (Apollon and APOEL respectively) took part in the UEFA Cup.

Eight different Cypriot teams have taken part in the competition. On five occasions one team took part in the group stage of the Champions League. Anorthosis were the first team that took part in the group stage, in the 2008–09 UEFA Champions League. APOEL were the participants on the other four occasions. The team that has progressed furthest was APOEL in the 2011–12 season, who reached the quarter-finals.

The table presents the statistics of Cypriot teams in the competition.

Statistics of Cypriots teams at European Cup/UEFA Champions League.
| | | | | Home | | | | | | Away | | | | | | Total | | | | | |
| Team | P | Pld | Q | W | D | L | GF | GA | Pts | W | D | L | GF | GA | Pts | W | D | L | GF | GA | Pts |
|---|---|---|---|---|---|---|---|---|---|---|---|---|---|---|---|---|---|---|---|---|---|
| APOEL FC | 17 | 90 | 19 | 21 | 11 | 13 | 64 | 51 | 74 | 5 | 15 | 25 | 28 | 67 | 30 | 26 | 26 | 38 | 92 | 118 | 104 |
| AC Omonia | 18 | 48 | 6 | 11 | 5 | 8 | 42 | 30 | 38 | 4 | 1 | 19 | 19 | 76 | 13 | 15 | 6 | 27 | 61 | 106 | 51 |
| Anorthosis Famagusta FC | 8 | 36 | 8 | 10 | 5 | 3 | 36 | 17 | 35 | 2 | 4 | 12 | 11 | 27 | 10 | 12 | 9 | 15 | 47 | 44 | 45 |
| Pafos FC | 1 | 14 | 1 | 3 | 3 | 1 | 12 | 10 | 12 | 4 | 2 | 1 | 6 | 2 | 14 | 7 | 5 | 2 | 18 | 12 | 26 |
| AEL Limassol | 3 | 10 | 2 | 4 | 0 | 1 | 7 | 7 | 12 | 1 | 1 | 3 | 1 | 11 | 4 | 5 | 1 | 4 | 8 | 18 | 16 |
| Apollon Limassol FC | 3 | 8 | 1 | 2 | 1 | 1 | 6 | 3 | 7 | 0 | 0 | 4 | 1 | 10 | 0 | 2 | 1 | 5 | 7 | 13 | 7 |
| AEK Larnaca FC | 1 | 2 | 0 | 0 | 1 | 0 | 1 | 1 | 1 | 0 | 1 | 0 | 1 | 1 | 1 | 0 | 2 | 0 | 2 | 2 | 2 |
| Olympiakos Nicosia | 3 | 6 | 0 | 0 | 1 | 2 | 2 | 19 | 1 | 0 | 0 | 3 | 2 | 17 | 0 | 0 | 1 | 5 | 4 | 36 | 1 |
| Pezoporikos Larnaca FC | 1 | 2 | 0 | 0 | 0 | 1 | 1 | 2 | 0 | 0 | 0 | 1 | 1 | 5 | 0 | 0 | 0 | 2 | 2 | 7 | 0 |
| Aris Limassol FC | 1 | 2 | 0 | 0 | 0 | 1 | 0 | 1 | 0 | 0 | 0 | 1 | 1 | 2 | 0 | 0 | 0 | 2 | 0 | 3 | 0 |
| EPA Larnaca FC | 1 | 2 | 0 | 0 | 0 | 1 | 0 | 6 | 0 | 0 | 0 | 1 | 0 | 10 | 0 | 0 | 0 | 2 | 0 | 16 | 0 |
| Total | 57 | 220 | 37 | 51 | 27 | 32 | 171 | 147 | 180 | 16 | 24 | 70 | 71 | 228 | 72 | 67 | 51 | 102 | 242 | 375 | 252 |

For purposes of comparison the calculated rating system used is: win = 3 points, draw = 1 point, defeat = 0 points.

The table presents the participation of Cypriot teams in the competitions per season.

Cypriot football clubs in European Cup/Champions League.
| Season | Team | Round | Opponent | Country | Home | Away | Agg. | Result |
|---|---|---|---|---|---|---|---|---|
| 1963–64 | Anorthosis | First preliminary | FK Partizan | Serbia^{CL3} | 1-3 | 0-3 | 1-6 | |
| 1964–65 | Cyprus championship was abandoned and no team was crowned as a champion. | | | | | | | |
| 1965–66 | APOEL | First round | SV Werder Bremen | German | 0-5^{CL1} | 0-5 | 0-10 | |
| 1966–67 | Omonia | First round | TSV 1860 Munich | German | 1-2^{CL1} | 0-8 | 1-10 | |
| 1967–68 | Olympiakos | First round | FK Sarajevo | Bosnia and Herzegovina | 2-2 | 1-3 | 3-5 | |
| 1968–69 | AEL | First round | Real Madrid CF | Spain | 0-6^{CL2} | 0-6 | 0-12 | |
| 1969–70 | Olympiakos | First round | Real Madrid CF | Spain | 0-8^{CL2} | 1-6 | 1-14 | |
| 1970–71 | EPA | First round | Borussia Mönchengladbach | German | 0-6^{CL1} | 0-10 | 0-16 | |
| 1971–72 | Olympiakos | First round | Feyenoord | Netherlands | 0-9^{CL2} | 0-8 | 0-17 | |
| 1972–73 | Omonia | First round | Waterford F.C. | Ireland | 2-0 | 1-2 | 3-2 | |
| 1972–73 | Omonia | Second round | FC Bayern Munich | German | 0-4^{CL1} | 0-9 | 0-13 | |
| 1973–74 | APOEL | First round | FC Zorya Luhansk | Ukraine^{CL4} | 0-1 | 0-2 | 0-3 | |
| 1974–75 | Omonia | First round | Cork Celtic F.C. | Ireland | Withdrew as a result of Turkish invasion of Cyprus. | | | |
| 1975–76 | Omonia | First round | Íþróttabandalag Akraness | Iceland | 2-1 | 0-4 | 2-5 | |
| 1976–77 | Omonia | First round | PAOK FC | Greece | 0- | 1-1 | 1-3 | |
| 1977–78 | Omonia | First round | Juventus F.C. | Italy | 0-3 | 0-2 | 0-5 | |
| 1978–79 | Omonia | First round | Bohemian F.C. | Ireland | 2-1 | 0-1 | 2-2 | |
| 1979–80 | Omonia | First round | FA Red Boys Differdange | Luxembourg | 6-1 | 1-2 | 7-3 | |
| 1979–80 | Omonia | Second round | AFC Ajax | Netherlands | 4-0 | 0-10 | 4-10 | |
| 1980–81 | APOEL | First round | Berliner FC Dynamo | German^{CL5} | 2-1 | 0-3 | 2-4 | |
| 1981–82 | Omonia | First round | S.L. Benfica | Portugal | 0-1 | 0- | 0-4 | |
| 1982–83 | Omonia | First round | Helsingin Jalkapalloklubi | Finland | 2-0 | 0-3 | 2-3 | |
| 1983–84 | Omonia | First round | USC CSKA Sofia | Bulgaria | 4-1 | 0-3 | 4-4 | |
| 1984–85 | Omonia | First round | FC Dinamo București | Romania | 2-1 | 1-4 | 3-5 | |
| 1985–86 | Omonia | First round | Rabat Ajax F.C. | Malta | 5-0 | 5-0 | 10-0 | |
| 1985–86 | Omonia | Second round | R.S.C. Anderlecht | Belgium | 1-3 | 0-1 | 1-4 | |
| 1986–87 | APOEL | First round | Helsingin Jalkapalloklubi | Finland | 1-0 | 2-3 | 3-3 | |
| 1986–87 | APOEL | Second round | Beşiktaş J.K. | Turkey | APOEL refused to play. | | | |
| 1987–88 | Omonia | First round | Shamrock Rovers F.C. | Ireland | 0-0 | 1-0 | 1-0 | |
| 1987–88 | Omonia | Second round | FC Steaua București | Romania | 0-2 | 1-3 | 1-5 | |
| 1988–89 | Pezoporikos | First round | IFK Göteborg | Sweden | 1-2 | 1-5 | 2-7 | |
| 1989–90 | Omonia | First round | FC Swarovski Tirol | Austria | 2-3 | 0-6 | 2-9 | |
| 1990–91 | APOEL | First round | FC Bayern Munich | German | 2-3 | 0-4 | 2-7 | |
| 1991–92 | Apollon | First round | FC U Craiova 1948 | Romania | 3-0 | 0-2 | 3-2 | |
| 1991–92 | Apollon | Second round | SD Crvena Zvezda | Serbia | 0-2 | 1-3 | 1-5 | |
| 1992–93 | APOEL | First round | AEK Athens F.C. | Greece | 2-2 | 1-1 | 3-3 | |
| 1993–94 | Omonia | Preliminary | FC Aarau | Switzerland | 2-1 | 0-2 | 2-3 | |
| 1994–95 | Cyprus didn't deserve a place to Champions League due to low country coefficient. | | | | | | | |
| 1995–96 | Anorthosis | Qualifying round | Rangers F.C. | Scotland | 0-0 | 0-1 | 0-1 | |
| 1996–97 | Cyprus didn't deserve a place to Champions League due to low country coefficient. | | | | | | | |
| 1997–98 | Anorthosis | First Qualifying | FK Kareda Kaunas | Lithuania | 3-0 | 1-1 | 3-1 | |
| 1997–98 | Anorthosis | Second Qualifying | Lierse S.K. | Belgium | 2-0 | 0-3 | 2-3 | |
| 1998–99 | Anorthosis | First Qualifying | Valletta F.C. | Malta | 6-0 | 2-0 | 8-0 | |
| 1998–99 | Anorthosis | Second Qualifying | Olympiacos F.C. | Greece | 2-4 | 1-2 | 3-6 | |
| 1999–2000 | Anorthosis | First Qualifying | ŠK Slovan Bratislava | Slovakia | 2-1 | 1-1 | 3-2 | |
| 1999–2000 | Anorthosis | Second Qualifying | Hertha BSC | German | 0-0 | 0-2 | 0-2 | |
| 2000–01 | Anorthosis | Second Qualifying | R.S.C. Anderlecht | Belgium | 0-0 | 2-4 | 2-4 | |
| 2001–02 | Omonia | Second Qualifying | SD Crvena Zvezda | Serbia | 1-1 | 1-2 | 2-3 | |
| 2002–03 | APOEL | First Qualifying | FC Flora | Estonia | 1-0 | 0-0 | 1-0 | |
| 2002–03 | APOEL | Second Qualifying | NK Maribor | Slovenia | 4-2 | 1-2 | 5-4 | |
| 2002–03 | APOEL | Third Qualifying | AEK Athens F.C. | Greece | 2-3 | 0-1 | 2-4 | |
| 2003–04 | Omonia | First Qualifying | FC Irtysh Pavlodar | Kazakhstan | 0-0 | 2-1 | 2-1 | |
| 2003–04 | Omonia | Second Qualifying | Wisła Kraków | Poland | 2-2 | 2-5 | 4-7 | |
| 2004–05 | APOEL | Second Qualifying | AC Sparta Prague | Czech Republic | 2-2 | 1-2 | 3-4 | |
| 2005–06 | Anorthosis | First Qualifying | FC Dinamo Minsk | Belarus | 1-0 | 1-1 | 2-1 | |
| 2005–06 | Anorthosis | Second Qualifying | Trabzonspor | Turkey | 3-1 | 0-1 | 3-2 | |
| 2005–06 | Anorthosis | Third Qualifying | Rangers F.C. | Scotland | 1-2 | 0-2 | 1-4 | |
| 2006–07 | Apollon | First Qualifying | Cork City F.C. | Ireland | 1-1 | 0-1 | 1-2 | |
| 2007–08 | APOEL | First Qualifying | FC BATE Borisov | Belarus | 2-0 | 0-3 (aet) | 2-3 | |
| 2008–09 | Anorthosis | First Qualifying | FC Pyunik | Armenia | 1-0 | 2-0 | 3-0 | |
| 2008–09 | Anorthosis | Second Qualifying | SK Rapid Wien | Austria | 3-0 | 1-3 | 4-3 | |
| 2008–09 | Anorthosis | Third Qualifying | Olympiacos F.C. | Greece | 3-0 | 0-1 | 3-1 | |
| 2008–09 | Anorthosis | Groups | SV Werder Bremen | German | 2-2 | 0-0 | 4th place | |
| 2008–09 | Anorthosis | Groups | Panathinaikos F.C. | Greece | 3-1 | 0-1 | 4th place | |
| 2008–09 | Anorthosis | Groups | Inter Milan | Italy | 3-3 | 0-1 | 4th place | |
| 2009–10 | APOEL | Second Qualifying | EB/Streymur | Faroe Islands | 3-0 | 2-0 | 5-0 | |
| 2009–10 | APOEL | Third Qualifying | FK Partizan | Serbia | 2-0 | 0-1 | 2-1 | |
| 2009–10 | APOEL | Play-off | F.C. Copenhagen | Denmark | 3-1 | 0-1 | 3-2 | |
| 2009–10 | APOEL | Groups | Atlético Madrid | Spain | 1-1 | 0-0 | 4th place | |
| 2009–10 | APOEL | Groups | Chelsea F.C. | England | 0-1 | 2-2 | 4th place | |
| 2009–10 | APOEL | Groups | FC Porto | Portugal | 0-1 | 1-2 | 4th place | |
| 2010–11 | Omonia | Second Qualifying | FK Renova | Macedonia | 3-0 | 2-0 | 5-0 | |
| 2010–11 | Omonia | Third Qualifying | FC Red Bull Salzburg | Austria | 1-1 | 1-4 | 2-5 | |
| 2011–12 | APOEL | Second Qualifying | KF Skënderbeu Korçë | Albania | 4-0 | 2-0 | 6-0 | |
| 2011–12 | APOEL | Third Qualifying | ŠK Slovan Bratislava | Slovakia | 0-0 | 2-0 | 2-0 | |
| 2011–12 | APOEL | Play-off | Wisła Kraków | Poland | 3-1 | 0-1 | 3-2 | |
| 2011–12 | APOEL | Groups | FC Zenit Saint Petersburg | Russia | 2-1 | 0-0 | 1st place | |
| 2011–12 | APOEL | Groups | FC Shakhtar Donetsk | Ukraine | 0-2 | 1-1 | 1st place | |
| 2011–12 | APOEL | Groups | FC Porto | Portugal | 2-1 | 1-1 | 1st place | |
| 2011–12 | APOEL | Round of 16 | Olympique Lyonnais | France | 1-0, 4-3 (pen) | 0-1 | 1-1 | |
| 2011–12 | APOEL | Quarter-finals | Real Madrid CF | Spain | 0-3 | 2-5 | 2-8 | |
| 2012–13 | AEL | Second round | Linfield F.C. | Northern Ireland | 3-0 | 0-0 | 3-0 | |
| 2012–13 | AEL | Third Round | FK Partizan | Serbia | 1-0 | 1-0 | 2-0 | |
| 2012–13 | AEL | Play-off | R.S.C. Anderlecht | Belgium | 2-1 | 0-2 | 2-3 | |
| 2013–14 | APOEL | Third Qualifying | NK Maribor | Slovenia | 1-1 | 0-0 | 1-1 | |
| 2014–15 | APOEL | Third Qualifying | Helsingin Jalkapalloklubi | Finland | 2-0 | 2-2 | 4-2 | |
| 2014–15 | APOEL | Play-off | AaB Fodbold | Denmark | 4-0 | 1-1 | 5-1 | |
| 2014–15 | APOEL | Groups | FC Barcelona | Spain | 0-4 | 0-1 | 4th place | |
| 2014–15 | APOEL | Groups | AFC Ajax | Netherlands | 1-1 | 0-4 | 4th place | |
| 2014–15 | APOEL | Groups | Paris Saint-Germain F.C. | France | 0-1 | 0-1 | 4th place | |
| 2014–15 | AEL | Third Qualifying | FC Zenit Saint Petersburg | Russia | 1-0 | 0-3 | 1-3 | |
| 2015–16 | APOEL | Second Qualifying | FK Vardar | Macedonia | 0-0 | 1-1 | 1-1 | |
| 2015–16 | APOEL | Third Qualifying | FC Midtjylland | Denmark | 0-1 | 2-1 | 2-2 | |
| 2015–16 | APOEL | Play-off | FC Astana | Kazakhstan | 1-1 | 0-1 | 1-2 | |
| 2016–17 | APOEL | Second Qualifying | The New Saints F.C. | Wales | 3-0 | 0-0 | 3-0 | |
| 2016–17 | APOEL | Third Qualifying | Rosenborg BK | Norway | 3-0 | 1-2 | 4-2 | |
| 2016–17 | APOEL | Play-off | F.C. Copenhagen | Denmark | 1-2 | 1-1 | 0-1 | |
| 2017-18 | APOEL | Second Qualifying | F91 Dudelange | Luxembourg | 1-0 | 1-0 | 2-0 | |
| 2017-18 | APOEL | Third Qualifying | FC Viitorul Constanța | Romania | 4-0 (aet) | 0-1 | 4-1 | |
| 2017-18 | APOEL | Play-off | SK Slavia Prague | Czech Republic | 2-0 | 0-0 | 2-0 | |
| 2017-18 | APOEL | Groups | Borussia Dortmund | Germany | 1-1 | 1-1 | 4th place | |
| 2017-18 | APOEL | Groups | Real Madrid CF | Spain | 0-6 | 0-3 | 4th place | |
| 2017-18 | APOEL | Groups | Tottenham Hotspur F.C. | England | 0-3 | 0-3 | 4th place | |
| 2018–19 | APOEL | First Qualifying | Sūduva Marijampolė | Lithuania | 1-0 | 1-3 | 2-3 | |
| 2019–20 | APOEL | Second Qualifying | FK Sutjeska Nikšić | Montenegro | 3-0 | 1-0 | 4-0 | |
| 2019–20 | APOEL | Third Qualifying | Qarabağ FK | Azerbaijan | 1-2 | 2-0 | 3-2 | |
| 2019–20 | APOEL | Play-off | AFC Ajax | Netherlands | 0-0 | 0-2 | 0-2 | |
| 2020–21 | Omonia | First Qualifying | Ararat-Armenia | Armenia | Single-leg tie | 1-0 (a.e.t.) | 1-0 | |
| 2020–21 | Omonia | Second Qualifying | Legia Warsaw | Poland | Single-leg tie | 2-0 (a.e.t.) | 2-0 | |
| 2020–21 | Omonia | Third Qualifying | Red Star Belgrade | Serbia | 1-1 (a.e.t.) (4–2 p) | Single-leg tie | 2-1 | |
| 2020–21 | Omonia | Play-off | Olympiacos F.C. | Greece | 0-0 | 0-2 | 0-2 | |
| 2021–22 | Omonia | Second Qualifying | Dinamo Zagreb | Croatia | 0-1 | 0-2 | 0-3 | |
| 2022–23 | AEK Larnaca | Second Qualifying | Midtjylland | Denmark | 1-1 (a.e.t.) | 1-1 | 2-2 (3–4 p) | |
| 2022–23 | Apollon Limassol | Third Qualifying | Maccabi Haifa | Israel | 2-0 | 0-4 | 2-4 | |
| 2023–24 | Aris Limassol | Third Qualifying | Raków Częstochowa | Israel | 0-1 | 1-2 | 1-3 | |
| 2024–25 | APOEL | Second Qualifying | Petrocub Hîncești | Moldova | 1-0 | 1-1 | 2-1 | |
| 2024–25 | APOEL | Third Qualifying | Slovan Bratislava | Slovakia | 0-0 | 0-2 | 0-2 | |
| 2025–26 | Pafos | Second Qualifying | Maccabi Tel Aviv | Israel | 1-1 | 1-0 | 2-1 | |
| 2025–26 | Pafos | Third Qualifying | Dynamo Kyiv | Ukraine | 2-0 | 1-0 | 3-0 | |
| 2025–26 | Pafos | Play-off | Red Star Belgrade | Serbia | 1-1 | 2-1 | 3-2 | |
| 2025–26 | Pafos | League | Olympiacos | Greece | —N/a | 0-0 | 26th place | |
| 2025–26 | Pafos | League | Bayern Munich | Germany | 1-5 | —N/a | 26th place | |
| 2025–26 | Pafos | League | Kairat | Kazakhstan | —N/a | 0-0 | 26th place | |
| 2025–26 | Pafos | League | Villarreal | Spain | 1-0 | —N/a | 26th place | |
| 2025–26 | Pafos | League | Monaco | France | 2-2 | —N/a | 26th place | |
| 2025–26 | Pafos | League | Juventus | Italy | —N/a | 2-0 | 26th place | |
| 2025–26 | Pafos | League | Chelsea | England | —N/a | 0-1 | 26th place | |
| 2025–26 | Pafos | League | Slavia Prague | Czech Republic | 4-1 | —N/a | 26th place | |

^{CL1: The home matches of Cypriot teams did not take place in Cyprus but in their opponents country, but not at opponents' ground.}
^{CL2: The home matches of Cypriot teams did not take place in Cyprus but in their opponents country, at opponents' ground.}
^{CL3: The Serbian team represented Yugoslavia.}
^{CL4: The Ukraine team represented Soviet Union.}
^{CL5: The German team represented East Germany.}

== UEFA Cup/Europa League ==
Cypriot teams began to participate to UEFA Cup (which renamed to UEFA Europa League at 2009) at 1971. The first team who participated was Digenis. From 1971 until 1999 only the second team of Cypriot First Division was taking part. In two season, beside the second team, the champions team also took part due to low country coefficient. Since 1999, at the competition take part also the winner of Cyprus Cup and nowadays more that two Cypriot teams are taking part to the competition. Furthermore, in many occasions the Cyprus champions, after eliminated from Champions League continue to UEFA Cup/Europa League.

Only in 1974–75 season no Cypriot team took part to the competition. As a result of Turkish invasion of Cyprus, the three teams that qualified to European competition withdrew. In UEFA Cup that team was Pezoporikos.

Fifteen different teams took part in the competition. The Cypriot teams had seven participation to the group stage. AEK was the first team that participated in the group stage at 2011–12 UEFA Europa League. The rest six participations came from APOEL (3), Apollon (2) and AEL (1). Most successful team was APOEL of 2016–17 season that qualifies and participated to round of 16.

The table presents the statistic of Cypriot teams in the competition.

Statistics of Cypriots teams at UEFA Cup/UEFA Europa League.
| | | | | Home | | | | | | Amay | | | | | | Total | | | | | |
| Team | P | Pld | Q | W | D | L | GF | GA | Pts | W | D | L | GF | GA | Pts | W | D | L | GF | GA | Pts |
|---|---|---|---|---|---|---|---|---|---|---|---|---|---|---|---|---|---|---|---|---|---|
| APOEL FC | 19 | 92 | 16 | 21 | 10 | 14 | 65 | 59 | 73 | 14 | 9 | 24 | 56 | 67 | 51 | 35 | 19 | 38 | 121 | 126 | 124 |
| AC Omonia | 20 | 78 | 18 | 20 | 11 | 8 | 73 | 38 | 71 | 11 | 8 | 20 | 46 | 62 | 41 | 31 | 19 | 28 | 119 | 100 | 112 |
| Apollon Limassol FC | 14 | 69 | 11 | 16 | 8 | 11 | 62 | 51 | 56 | 8 | 6 | 20 | 39 | 66 | 33 | 25 | 14 | 30 | 101 | 117 | 89 |
| Anorthosis Famagusta FC | 18 | 59 | 12 | 14 | 3 | 12 | 46 | 34 | 45 | 9 | 2 | 19 | 32 | 74 | 29 | 23 | 5 | 41 | 78 | 108 | 74 |
| AEK Larnaca FC | 6 | 38 | 9 | 12 | 4 | 3 | 31 | 12 | 40 | 7 | 5 | 7 | 27 | 27 | 26 | 19 | 9 | 10 | 58 | 39 | 66 |
| AEL Limassol | 5 | 18 | 2 | 4 | 1 | 4 | 15 | 8 | 13 | 2 | 2 | 5 | 6 | 16 | 8 | 6 | 3 | 9 | 21 | 24 | 21 |
| Olympiakos Nicosia | 2 | 6 | 1 | 0 | 2 | 1 | 4 | 8 | 2 | 1 | 0 | 2 | 5 | 18 | 3 | 1 | 2 | 3 | 9 | 26 | 5 |
| Ethnikos Achna FC | 1 | 4 | 1 | 1 | 1 | 0 | 5 | 0 | 4 | 0 | 0 | 2 | 2 | 5 | 0 | 1 | 1 | 2 | 7 | 5 | 4 |
| Pezoporikos Larnaca FC | 3 | 6 | 0 | 0 | 2 | 1 | 5 | 8 | 2 | 0 | 0 | 3 | 1 | 12 | 0 | 0 | 2 | 4 | 6 | 20 | 2 |
| APOP Kinyras FC | 1 | 2 | 0 | 0 | 1 | 0 | 2 | 2 | 1 | 0 | 0 | 1 | 1 | 2 | 0 | 0 | 1 | 1 | 3 | 4 | 1 |
| Ermis Aradippou FC | 1 | 2 | 0 | 0 | 0 | 1 | 0 | 2 | 0 | 0 | 0 | 1 | 0 | 1 | 0 | 0 | 0 | 2 | 0 | 3 | 0 |
| EPA Larnaca FC | 2 | 4 | 0 | 0 | 0 | 2 | 0 | 2 | 0 | 0 | 0 | 2 | 0 | 4 | 0 | 0 | 0 | 4 | 0 | 6 | 0 |
| Digenis Akritas Morphou FC | 1 | 2 | 0 | 0 | 0 | 1 | 0 | 3 | 0 | 0 | 0 | 1 | 0 | 4 | 0 | 0 | 0 | 2 | 0 | 7 | 0 |
| Alki Larnaca FC | 1 | 2 | 0 | 0 | 0 | 1 | 0 | 9 | 0 | 0 | 0 | 1 | 0 | 3 | 0 | 0 | 0 | 2 | 0 | 12 | 0 |
| Enosis Neon Paralimni FC | 2 | 4 | 0 | 0 | 0 | 2 | 3 | 6 | 0 | 0 | 0 | 2 | 1 | 15 | 0 | 0 | 0 | 4 | 4 | 21 | 0 |
| Total | 95 | 378 | 69 | 86 | 43 | 59 | 305 | 234 | 301 | 52 | 31 | 107 | 212 | 372 | 187 | 138 | 74 | 166 | 517 | 606 | 488 |

For purposes of comparison the calculated rating system used is: win = 3 points, draw = 1 point, defeat = 0 points.
Updated as of end of 2020–21 UEFA Europa League

The table presents the participation of Cypriot teams in the competitions per season.

Cypriot football clubs in UEFA Cup/UEFA Europa League.
| Season | Team | Round | Opponent | Country | Home | Away | Agg. | Result |
|---|---|---|---|---|---|---|---|---|
| 1971–72 | Digenis | First round | A.C. Milan | Italy | 0-3^{EL1} | 0-4 | 0-7 | |
| 1972–73 | EPA | First round | FC Ararat Yerevan | Armenia^{EL6} | 0-1 | 0-1 | 0-2 | |
| 1973–74 | Olympiakos | First round | VfB Stuttgart | Germany | 0-4 | 0-9 | 0-13 | |
| 1974–75 | Pezoporikos | First round | Dukla Prague | Czech Republic^{EL7} | Withdrew due to Turkish invasion of Cyprus. | | | |
| 1975–76 | Enosis Neon Paralimni | First round | MSV Duisburg | Germany | 2-3 | 1-7 | 3-10 | |
| 1976–77 | Enosis Neon Paralimni | First round | 1. FC Kaiserslautern | Germany | 1-3 | 0-8 | 1-11 | |
| 1977–78 | APOEL | First round | Torino F.C. | Italy | 1-1 | 0-3 | 1-4 | |
| 1978–79 | Pezoporikos | First round | Śląsk Wrocław | Poland | 2-2 | 1-5 | 3-7 | |
| 1979–80 | Alki | First round | FC Dinamo București | Romania | 2-2 | 1-5 | 3-7 | |
| 1980–81 | Pezoporikos | First round | VfB Stuttgart | Germany | 1-4 | 0-6 | 1-10 | |
| 1981–82 | APOEL | First round | FC Argeș Pitești | Romania | 1-1 | 0-4 | 1-5 | |
| 1982–83 | Pezoporikos | First round | FC Zürich | Switzerland | 2-2 | 0-1 | 2-3 | |
| 1983–84 | Anorthosis | First round | FC Bayern Munich | Germany | 0-1 | 0-10 | 0-11 | |
| 1984–85 | Apollon | First round | Bohemians 1905 | Czech Republic^{EL7} | 2-2 | 1-6 | 3-8 | |
| 1985–86 | APOEL | First round | FC Lokomotiv 1929 Sofia | Bulgaria | 2-2 | 2-4 (aet) | 4-6 | |
| 1986–87 | Omonia | First round | FC Sportul Studențesc București | Romania | 1-1 | 0-1 | 1-2 | |
| 1987–88 | EPA | First round | Victoria București | Romania | 0-1 | 0-3 | 0-4 | |
| 1988–89 | APOEL | First round | FK Velež Mostar | Bosnia and Herzegovina | 2-5 | 0-1 | 2-6 | |
| 1989–90 | Apollon | First round | Real Zaragoza | Spain | 0-3 | 1-1 | 1-4 | |
| 1990–91 | Omonia | First round | PFC Slavia Sofia | Bulgaria | 4-2 | 1-2 | 5-4 | |
| 1990–91 | Omonia | Second round | R.S.C. Anderlecht | Belgium | 1-1 | 0-3 | 1-4 | |
| 1991–92 | Anorthosis | First round | FC Steaua București | Romania | 1-2 | 2-2 | 3-4 | |
| 1992–93 | Anorthosis | First round | Juventus F.C. | Italy | 0- | 1-6 | 1-10 | |
| 1993–94 | Apollon | First round | Dunakanyar-Vác FC | Hungary | 4-0 | 0-2 | 4-2 | |
| 1993–94 | Apollon | Second round | Inter Milan | Italy | 3-3 | 0-1 | 3-4 | |
| 1994–95 | Apollon | Preliminary | KF Teuta Durrës | Albania | 4-2 | 4-1 | 8-3 | |
| 1994–95 | Apollon | First round | FC Sion | Switzerland | 1-3 | 3-2 (aet) | 4-5 | |
| 1994–95 | Anorthosis | Preliminary | PFC Shumen 2010 | Bulgaria | 2-0 | 2-1 | 4-1 | |
| 1994–95 | Anorthosis | First round | Athletic Bilbao | Spain | 2-0 | 0-3 | 2-3 | |
| 1995–96 | Omonia | Preliminary | Sliema Wanderers F.C. | Malta | 3-0 | 2-1 | 5-1 | |
| 1995–96 | Omonia | First round | S.S. Lazio | Italy | 1-2 | 0-5 | 1-7 | |
| 1996–97 | APOEL | First preliminary | B71 Sandoy | Faroe Islands | 4-2 | 5-1 | 9-3 | |
| 1996–97 | APOEL | Second preliminary | Iraklis | Greece | 2-1 | 1-0 | 3-1 | |
| 1996–97 | APOEL | First round | RCD Espanyol | Spain | 2-2 | 0-1 | 2-3 | |
| 1996–97 | Anorthosis | First preliminary | Shirak SC | Armenia | 4-0 | 2-2 | 6-2 | |
| 1996–97 | Anorthosis | Second preliminary | Neuchâtel Xamax | Switzerland | 1-2 | 0-4 | 1-6 | |
| 1997–98 | Apollon | First preliminary | MYPA | Finland | 3-0 | 1-1 | 4-1 | |
| 1997–98 | Apollon | Second preliminary | R.E. Mouscron | Belgium | 0-0 | 0-3 | 0-3 | |
| 1997–98 | Anorthosis^{EL3} | First round | Karlsruher SC | Germany | 1-1 | 1-2 | 1-3 | |
| 1998–99 | Omonia | First preliminary | Linfield F.C. | Northern Ireland | 5-1 | 3-5 | 8-6 | |
| 1998–99 | Omonia | Second preliminary | SK Rapid Wien | Austria | 3-1 | 0-2 | 3-3 | |
| 1998–99 | Anorthosis^{EL3} | First round | FC Zürich | Switzerland | 2-3 | 0-4 | 2-7 | |
| 1999–2000 | Anorthosis^{EL3} | First round | Legia Warsaw | Poland | 1-0 | 0-2 | 1-2 | |
| 1999–2000 | APOEL | Preliminary | Levski Sofia | Bulgaria | 0-0 | 0-2 | 0-2 | |
| 1999–2000 | Omonia | Preliminary | FC Belshina Bobruisk | Belarus | 3-0 | 5-1 | 8-1 | |
| 1999–2000 | Omonia | First round | Juventus F.C. | Italy | 2-5 | 0-5 | 2-10 | |
| 2000–01 | APOEL | Preliminary | FK Tomori Berat | Albania | 2-0 | 3-2 | 5-2 | |
| 2000–01 | APOEL | First round | Club Brugge KV | Belgium | 0-1 | 0-2 | 0-3 | |
| 2000–01 | Omonia | Preliminary | PFC Neftochimic Burgas | Bulgaria | 0-0 | 1-2 | 1-2 | |
| 2001–02 | Apollon | Preliminary | KF Tirana | Albania | 3-1 | 2-3 | 5-4 | |
| 2001–02 | Apollon | First round | AFC Ajax | Netherlands | 0-3 | 0-2 | 0-5 | |
| 2001–02 | Olympiakos | Preliminary | Dunaújváros FC | Hungary | 2-2 | 4-2 | 6-4 | |
| 2001–02 | Olympiakos | First round | Club Brugge KV | Belgium | 2-2 | 1-7 | 3-9 | |
| 2002–03 | AEL | Preliminary | Ferencvárosi TC | Hungary | 2-1 | 0-4 | 2-5 | |
| 2002–03 | Anorthosis | Preliminary | CS Grevenmacher | Luxembourg | 3-0 | 0-2 | 3-2 | |
| 2002–03 | Anorthosis | First round | Iraklis | Greece | 3-1 | 2-4 | 5-5 (a.) | |
| 2002–03 | Anorthosis | Second round | Boavista F.C. | Portugal | 0-1 | 1-2 | 1-3 | |
| 2002–03 | APOEL^{EL3} | First round | Grazer AK | Austria | 2-0 | 1-1 | 3-1 | |
| 2002–03 | APOEL^{EL3} | Second round | Hertha BSC | Germany | 0-1 | 0-4 | 0-5 | |
| 2003–04 | Anorthosis | Preliminary | FK Željezničar Sarajevo | Bosnia and Herzegovina | 1-3 | 0-1 | 1-4 | |
| 2003–04 | APOEL | Preliminary | Derry City F.C. | Northern Ireland | 2-1 | 3-0 | 5-1 | |
| 2003–04 | APOEL | First round | RCD Mallorca | Spain | 1-2 | 2-4 | 3-6 | |
| 2004–05 | AEK | Second preliminary | Maccabi Petah Tikva F.C. | Israel | 3-0 | 0-4 | 3-4 | |
| 2004–05 | Omonia | First preliminary | FK Sloga Jugomagnat | Macedonia | 4-0 | 4-1 | 8-1 | |
| 2004–05 | Omonia | Second preliminary | USC CSKA Sofia | Bulgaria | 1-1 | 1-3 (aet) | 2-4 | |
| 2005–06 | Anorthosis^{EL3} | First round | U.S. Città di Palermo | Italy | 0-4 | 1-2 | 1-6 | |
| 2005–06 | APOEL | First preliminary | Birkirkara F.C. | Malta | 4-0 | 2-0 | 6-0 | |
| 2005–06 | APOEL | Second preliminary | Maccabi Tel Aviv | Israel | 1-0 | 2-2 (aet) | 3-2 | |
| 2005–06 | APOEL | First round | Hertha BSC | Germany | 0-1 | 1-3 | 1-4 | |
| 2005–06 | Omonia | First preliminary | Hibernians F.C. | Malta | 3-0 | 3-0 | 6-0 | |
| 2005–06 | Omonia | Second preliminary | FC Dinamo București | Romania | 2-1 | 1-3 | 3-4 | |
| 2006–07 | APOEL | First preliminary | S.S. Murata | San Marino | 3-1 | 4-0 | 7-1 | |
| 2006–07 | APOEL | Second preliminary | Trabzonspor | Turkey | 1-1 | 0-1 | 1-2 | |
| 2006–07 | Ethnikos Achna^{EL4} | Second preliminary | K.S.V. Roeselare | Belgium | 5-0 | 1-2 | 6-2 | |
| 2006–07 | Ethnikos Achna^{EL4} | First round | RC Lens | France | 0-0 | 1-3 | 1-3 | |
| 2006–07 | Omonia | First preliminary | HNK Rijeka | Croatia | 2-1 | 2-2 | 4-3 | |
| 2006–07 | Omonia | Second preliminary | PFC Litex Lovech | Bulgaria | 0-0 | 1-2 | 1-2 | |
| 2007–08 | Anorthosis | First preliminary | FK Vardar | Macedonia | 1-0 | 1-0 | 2-0 | |
| 2007–08 | Anorthosis | Second preliminary | CFR Cluj | Romania | 0-0 | 3-1 | 3-1 | |
| 2007–08 | Anorthosis | First round | Tottenham Hotspur F.C. | England | 1-1 | 1-6 | 1-7 | |
| 2007–08 | Omonia | First preliminary | FK Rudar Pljevlja | Montenegro | 2-0 | 2-0 | 4-0 | |
| 2007–08 | Omonia | Second preliminary | USC CSKA Sofia | Bulgaria | 1-1 | 1-2 | 2-3 | |
| 2008–09 | APOEL | First preliminary | FK Pelister | Macedonia | 1-0 | 0-0 | 1-0 | |
| 2008–09 | APOEL | Second preliminary | SD Crvena Zvezda | Serbia | 2-2 | 3-3 (aet) | 5-5 | |
| 2008–09 | APOEL | First round | FC Schalke 04 | Germany | 1-4 | 1-1 | 1-5 | |
| 2008–09 | Omonia | First preliminary | FK Milano Kumanovo | Macedonia | 2-0 | 2-1 | 4-1 | |
| 2008–09 | Omonia | Second preliminary | AEK Athens F.C. | Greece | 2-2 | 1-0 | 3-2 | |
| 2008–09 | Omonia | First round | Manchester City F.C. | England | 1-2 | 1-2 | 2-4 | |
| 2009–10 | Anorthosis | First preliminary | UN Käerjéng 97 | Luxembourg | 5-0 | 2-1 | 7-1 | |
| 2009–10 | Anorthosis | Second preliminary | OFK Petrovac | Montenegro | 2-1 | 1-3 (aet) | 3-4 | |
| 2009–10 | APOP Kinyras | Preliminary | SK Rapid Wien | Austria | 2-2 (aet) | 1-2 | 3-4 | |
| 2009–10 | Omonia | Second preliminary | Havnar Bóltfelag | Faroe Islands | 4-0 | 4-1 | 8-1 | |
| 2009–10 | Omonia | Third preliminary | FC Vaslui | Romania | 1-1 | 0-2 | 1-3 | |
| 2010–11 | Anorthosis | First preliminary | FC Banants | Armenia | 3-0 | 1-0 | 4-0 | |
| 2010–11 | Anorthosis | Second preliminary | HNK Šibenik | Croatia | 0-2 | 3-0 (aet) | 3-2 | |
| 2010–11 | Anorthosis | Third preliminary | Cercle Brugge K.S.V. | Belgium | 3-1 | 0-1 | 3-2 | |
| 2010–11 | Anorthosis | Play-off | PFC CSKA Moscow | Russia | 1-2 | 0-4 | 1-6 | |
| 2010–11 | APOEL | Second preliminary | FK Tauras Tauragė | Lithuania | 3–1 | 3–0 | 6-1 | |
| 2010–11 | APOEL | Third preliminary | FK Jablonec | Czech Republic | 1–0 | 3–1 | 4-1 | |
| 2010–11 | APOEL | Play-off | Getafe CF | Spain | 1-1 (aet) | 0-1 | 1-2 | |
| 2010–11 | Apollon | Third preliminary | FC Sibir Novosibirsk | Russia | 2-1 | 0-1 | 2-2 (a.) | |
| 2010–11 | Omonia^{EL3} | Play-off | FC Metalist Kharkiv | Ukraine | 0-1 | 2-2 | 2-3 | |
| 2011–12 | AEK | Second preliminary | Floriana F.C. | Malta | 1-0 | 8-0 | 9-0 | |
| 2011–12 | AEK | Third preliminary | FK Mladá Boleslav | Czech Republic | 3-0 | 2-2 | 5-2 | |
| 2011–12 | AEK | Play-off | Rosenborg BK | Norway | 2-1 | 0-0 | 2-1 | |
| 2011–12 | AEK | Groups | Maccabi Haifa F.C. | Israel | 2-1 | 0-1 | 4th place | |
| 2011–12 | AEK | Groups | FC Steaua București | Romania | 1-1 | 1-3 | 4th place | |
| 2011–12 | AEK | Groups | FC Schalke 04 | Germany | 0-5 | 0-0 | 4th place | |
| 2011–12 | Anorthosis | Second preliminary | FC Gagra | Georgia | 3-0 | 0-2 | 3-2 | |
| 2011–12 | Anorthosis | Third preliminary | FK Rabotnichki | Macedonia | 0-2 | 2-1 | 2-3 | |
| 2011–12 | Omonia | Third preliminary | ADO Den Haag | Netherlands | 3-0 | 0-1 | 3-1 | |
| 2011–12 | Omonia | Play-off | FC Red Bull Salzburg | Austria | 2-1 | 0-1 | 2-2 (a.) | |
| 2012–13 | AEL^{EL3} | Groups | Borussia Mönchengladbach | Germany | 0-0 | 0-2 | 4th place | |
| 2012–13 | AEL^{EL3} | Groups | Olympique de Marseille | France | 3-0 | 1-5 | 4th place | |
| 2012–13 | AEL^{EL3} | Groups | Fenerbahçe S.K. | Turkey | 0-1 | 0-2 | 4th place | |
| 2012–13 | Anorthosis | Second preliminary | FCI Levadia Tallinn | Switzerland | 3-0 | 3-1 | 6-1 | |
| 2012–13 | Anorthosis | Third preliminary | FC Dila Gori | Georgia | 0-3 | 1-0 | 1-3 | |
| 2012–13 | APOEL | Second preliminary | FK Senica | Slovakia | 2-0 | 1-0 | 3-0 | |
| 2012–13 | APOEL | Third preliminary | Aalesunds FK | Norway | 2-1 | 1-0 | 3-1 | |
| 2012–13 | APOEL | Play-off | Neftçi PFK | Azerbaijan | 1-3 | 1-1 | 2-4 | |
| 2012–13 | Omonia | Third preliminary | SD Crvena Zvezda | Serbia | 0-0 (5-6 pen) | 0-0 | 0-0 (agr) | |
| 2013–14 | Anorthosis | Second preliminary | Gefle IF | Sweden | 3-0 | 0-4 | 3-4 | |
| 2013–14 | APOEL | Play-off | S.V. Zulte Waregem | Belgium | 1-2 | 1-1 | 2-3 | |
| 2013–14 | APOEL | Groups^{EL5} | Eintracht Frankfurt | Germany | 0-3 | 0-2 | 3rd place | |
| 2013–14 | APOEL | Groups^{EL5} | Maccabi Tel Aviv | Israel | 0-0 | 0-0 | 3rd place | |
| 2013–14 | APOEL | Groups^{EL5} | FC Girondins de Bordeaux | France | 2-1 | 1-2 | 3rd place | |
| 2013–14 | Apollon | Play-off | OGC Nice | France | 2-0 | 0-1 | 2-1 | |
| 2013–14 | Apollon | Groups | S.S. Lazio | Italy | 0-0 | 1-2 | 3rd place | |
| 2013–14 | Apollon | Groups | Legia Warsaw | Poland | 0-2 | 1-0 | 3rd place | |
| 2013–14 | Apollon | Groups | Trabzonspor | Turkey | 1-2 | 2-4 | 3rd place | |
| 2013–14 | Omonia | Second preliminary | FC Astra Giurgiu | Romania | 1-2 | 1-1 | 1-3 | |
| 2014–15 | AEL^{EL3} | Play-off | Tottenham Hotspur F.C. | England | 1-2 | 0-3 | 1-5 | |
| 2014–15 | Apollon | Play-off | FC Lokomotiv Moscow | Russia | 1-1 | 4-1 | 5-2 | |
| 2014–15 | Apollon | Groups | FC Zürich | Switzerland | 3-2 | 1-3 | 4th place | |
| 2014–15 | Apollon | Groups | Villarreal | Spain | 0-2 | 0-4 | 4th place | |
| 2014–15 | Apollon | Groups | Borussia Mönchengladbach | Germany | 0-2 | 0-5 | 4th place | |
| 2014–15 | Ermis | Preliminary | BSC Young Boys | Switzerland | 0-2 | 0-1 | 0-3 | |
| 2014–15 | Omonia | Second preliminary | FK Budućnost Podgorica | Montenegro | 0-0 | 2-0 | 2-0 | |
| 2014–15 | Omonia | Third preliminary | FK Metalurg Skopje | Macedonia | 3-0 | 1-0 | 4-0 | |
| 2014–15 | Omonia | Play-off | FC Dynamo Moscow | Russia | 1-2 | 2-2 | 3-4 | |
| 2015–16 | AEK | Third preliminary | FC Girondins de Bordeaux | France | 0-1 | 0-3 | 0-4 | |
| 2015–16 | APOEL | Groups | FC Schalke 04 | Germany | 0-3 | 0-1 | 4th place | |
| 2015–16 | APOEL | Groups | AC Sparta Prague | Czech Republic | 1-3 | 0-2 | 4th place | |
| 2015–16 | APOEL | Groups | Asteras Tripolis | Greece | 2-1 | 0-2 | 4th place | |
| 2015–16 | Apollon | First preliminary | FC Saxan | Moldova | 2-0 | 2-0 | 4-0 | |
| 2015–16 | Apollon | Second preliminary | FK Trakai | Lithuania | 4-0 | 0-0 | 4-0 | |
| 2015–16 | Apollon | Third preliminary | Gabala FK | Azerbaijan | 1-1 | 0-1 | 1-2 | |
| 2015–16 | Omonia | First preliminary | FC Dinamo Batumi | Georgia | 2-0 | 0-1 | 2-1 | |
| 2015–16 | Omonia | Second preliminary | Jagiellonia Białystok | Poland | 1-0 | 0-0 | 1-0 | |
| 2015–16 | Omonia | Third preliminary | Brøndby IF | Denmark | 2-2 | 0-0 | 2-2 (a.) | |
| 2016–17 | AEK | First preliminary | S.S. Folgore Falciano Calcio | San Marino | 3-0 | 3-1 | 6-1 | |
| 2016–17 | AEK | Second preliminary | Cliftonville F.C. | Northern Ireland | 2-0 | 3-2 | 5-2 | |
| 2016–17 | AEK | Third preliminary | FC Spartak Moscow | Russia | 1-1 | 1-0 | 2-1 | |
| 2016–17 | AEK | Play-off | FC Slovan Liberec | Czech Republic | 0-1 | 0-3 | 0-4 | |
| 2016–17 | APOEL | Groups | BSC Young Boys | Switzerland | 1-0 | 1-2 | 1st place | |
| 2016–17 | APOEL | Groups | Olympiacos F.C. | Greece | 2-0 | 1-0 | 1st place | |
| 2016–17 | APOEL | Groups | FC Astana | Kazakhstan | 2-1 | 1-3 | 1st place | |
| 2016–17 | APOEL | Round of 32 | Athletic Bilbao | Spain | 2-0 | 2-3 | 4-3 | |
| 2016–17 | APOEL | Round of 16 | R.S.C. Anderlecht | Belgium | 0-1 | 0-1 | 0-2 | |
| 2016–17 | Apollon | Third preliminary | Grasshopper Club Zürich | Switzerland | 1-2 | 3-3 | 4-5 | |
| 2016–17 | Omonia | First preliminary | FC Banants | Armenia | 1-0 | 4-1 (aet) | 5-1 | |
| 2016–17 | Omonia | Second preliminary | Beitar Jerusalem F.C. | Israel | 3-2 | 0-1 | 3-3 (a.) | |
| 2017–18 | Apollon | Second preliminary | FC Zaria Bălți | Moldova | 3-0 | 2-1 | 5-1 | |
| 2017–18 | Apollon | Third preliminary | Aberdeen F.C. | Scotland | 2-0 | 1-2 | 3-2 | |
| 2017–18 | Apollon | Play-off | FC Midtjylland | Denmark | 3-2 | 1-1 | 4-3 | |
| 2017–18 | Apollon | Groups | Atalanta B.C. | Italy | 1-1 | 1-3 | 4th place | |
| 2017–18 | Apollon | Groups | Everton F.C. | England | 0-3 | 2-2 | 4th place | |
| 2017–18 | Apollon | Groups | Olympique Lyonnais | France | 1-1 | 0-4 | 4th place | |
| 2017–18 | AEK | First preliminary | Lincoln Red Imps F.C. | Gibraltar | 5-0 | 1-1 | 6-1 | |
| 2017–18 | AEK | Second preliminary | Cork City F.C. | Ireland | 1-0 | 1-0 | 2-0 | |
| 2017–18 | AEK | Third preliminary | FC Dinamo Minsk | Belarus | 2-0 | 1-1 | 3-1 | |
| 2017–18 | AEK | Play-off | FC Viktoria Plzeň | Czech Republic | 0-0 | 1-3 | 1-3 | |
| 2017–18 | AEL | First preliminary | St Joseph's F.C. | Gibraltar | 6-0 | 4-0 | 10-0 | |
| 2017–18 | AEL | Second preliminary | FC Progrès Niederkorn | Luxembourg | 2-1 | 1-0 | 3-1 | |
| 2017–18 | AEL | Third preliminary | FK Austria Wien | Austria | 2-0 | 1-1 | 3-1 | |
| 2018–19 | Apollon | First preliminary | FC Stumbras | Lithuania | 2-0 | 0-1 | 2-1 | |
| 2018–19 | Apollon | Second preliminary | FK Željezničar Sarajevo | Bosnia and Herzegovina | 3-1 | 2-1 | 5-2 | |
| 2018–19 | Apollon | Third preliminary | FC Dynamo Brest | Belarus | 4-0 | 0-1 | 4-1 | |
| 2018–19 | Apollon | Play-off | FC Basel | Switzerland | 1-0 | 2-3 | 3-3 | |
| 2018–19 | Apollon | Groups | Eintracht Frankfurt | Germany | 2-3 | 0-2 | 3rd place | |
| 2018–19 | Apollon | Groups | S.S. Lazio | Italy | 2-0 | 1-2 | 3rd place | |
| 2018–19 | Apollon | Groups | Olympique de Marseille | France | 2-2 | 3-1 | 3rd place | |
| 2018–19 | Anorthosis | First preliminary | KF Laçi | Albania | 2-1 | 0-1 | 2-2 | |
| 2018–19 | AEK | Second preliminary | Dundalk F.C. | Ireland | 4-0 | 0-0 | 4-0 | |
| 2018–19 | AEK | Third preliminary | SK Sturm Graz | Austria | 5-0 | 2-0 | 7-0 | |
| 2018–19 | AEK | Play-off | AS Trenčín | Slovakia | 3-0 | 1-1 | 4-1 | |
| 2018–19 | AEK | Groups | Bayer 04 Leverkusen | Germany | 1-5 | 2-4 | 3rd place | |
| 2018–19 | AEK | Groups | FC Zürich | Switzerland | 0-1 | 2-1 | 3rd place | |
| 2018–19 | AEK | Groups | PFC Ludogorets Razgrad | Bulgaria | 1-1 | 0-0 | 3rd place | |
| 2018–19 | APOEL | Second preliminary | FC Flora | Estonia | 5-0 | 0-2 | 5-2 | |
| 2018–19 | APOEL | Third preliminary | Hapoel Be'er Sheva F.C. | Israel | 3-1 | 2-2 | 5-3 | |
| 2018–19 | APOEL | Play-off | FC Astana | Kazakhstan | 1-0 | 0-1 (1-2 pen) | 1-2 | |
| 2019–20 | Apollon | First qualifying | Kauno Žalgiris | Lithuania | 4-0 | 2-0 | 6-0 | |
| 2019–20 | Apollon | Second qualifying | Shamrock Rovers F.C. | Ireland | 3-1 (a.e.t.) | 1-2 | 4-3 | |
| 2019–20 | Apollon | Third qualifying | Austria Wien | Austria | 3-1 | 2-1 | 5-2 | |
| 2019–20 | Apollon | Play-off | PSV Eindhoven | Netherlands | 0-4 | 0-3 | 0-7 | |
| 2019–20 | AEK | First qualifying | Petrocub Hîncești | Moldova | 1-0 | 1-0 | 2-0 | |
| 2019–20 | AEK | Second qualifying | Levski Sofia | Bulgaria | 3-0 | 4-0 | 7-0 | |
| 2019–20 | AEK | Third qualifying | Gent | Belgium | 1-1 | 0-3 | 1-4 | |
| 2019–20 | AEL | Second qualifying | Aris | Greece | 0-1 | 0-0 | 0-1 | |
| 2019–20 | APOEL | Groups | F91 Dudelange | Luxembourg | 3-4 | 2-0 | 2nd place | |
| 2019–20 | APOEL | Groups | Qarabağ | Azerbaijan | 2-1 | 2-2 | 2nd place | |
| 2019–20 | APOEL | Groups | Sevilla | Spain | 1-0 | 0-1 | 2nd place | |
| 2019–20 | APOEL | Round of 32 | Basel | Switzerland | 0-3 | 0-1 | 0-4 | |
| 2020–21 | Apollon | First qualifying | Saburtalo Tbilisi | Georgia | 5-1 | | 5-1 | |
| 2020–21 | Apollon | Second qualifying | OFI | Greece | | 1-0 | 1-0 | |
| 2020–21 | Apollon | Third qualifying | Lech Poznań | Poland | 0-5 | | 0-5 | |
| 2020–21 | APOEL | First qualifying | Gjilani | Kosovo | | 2-0 (a.e.t.) | 2-0 | |
| 2020–21 | APOEL | Second qualifying | Kaisar | Kazakhstan | | 4-1 | 4-1 | |
| 2020–21 | APOEL | Third qualifying | Zrinjski Mostar | Bosnia and Herzegovina | 2-2 (a.e.t.) | | 2-2 (4-2 p) | |
| 2020–21 | APOEL | Play-off | Slovan Liberec | Czech Republic | | 0-1 | 0-1 | |
| 2020–21 | Anorthosis | Third qualifying | Basel | Switzerland | | 2-3 | 2-3 | |
| 2020–21 | Omonia | Groups | Granada | Spain | 0-2 | 1-2 | 4th place | |
| 2020–21 | Omonia | Groups | PAOK | Greece | 2-1 | 1-1 | 4th place | |
| 2020–21 | Omonia | Groups | PSV Eindhoven | Netherlands | 1-2 | 0-4 | 4th place | |
| 2021–22 | Anorthosis | Third qualifying | Rapid Wien | Austria | 2-1 | 0-3 | 2-4 | |
| 2021–22 | Omonia | Third qualifying | Flora | Estonia | 1-0 | 1-2 (a.e.t.) | 2-2 (5-4 p) | |
| 2021–22 | Omonia | Play-off | Royal Antwerp | Belgium | 4-2 | 0-2 | 4-4 (2-3 p) | |
| 2022–23 | AEK | Third qualifying | Partizan | Serbia | 2-1 | 2-2 | 4-3 | |
| 2022–23 | AEK | Play-off | Dnipro-1 | Ukraine | 3-0 | 2-1 | 5-1 | |
| 2022–23 | AEK | Groups | Dynamo Kyiv | Ukraine | 3-3 | 1-0 | 3rd place | |
| 2022–23 | AEK | Groups | Fenerbahçe | Turkey | 1-2 | 0-2 | 3rd place | |
| 2022–23 | AEK | Groups | Rennes | France | 1-2 | 1-1 | 3rd place | |
| 2022–23 | Apollon | Play-off | Olympiacos | Greece | 1-1 | 1-1 (a.e.t.) | 2-2 (1-3 p) | |
| 2022–23 | Omonia | Play-off | Gent | Belgium | 2-0 | 2-0 | 4-0 | |
| 2022–23 | Omonia | Groups | Manchester United | England | 2-3 | 0-1 | 4th place | |
| 2022–23 | Omonia | Groups | Real Sociedad | Spain | 0-2 | 1-2 | 4th place | |
| 2022–23 | Omonia | Groups | Sheriff Tiraspol | Moldova | 0-3 | 0-1 | 4th place | |
| 2023–24 | Aris | Play-off | Slovan Bratislava | Slovakia | 1-2 | 6-2 | 7-4 | |
| 2023–24 | Aris | Groups | Rangers | Scotland | 2-1 | 1-1 | 4th place | |
| 2023–24 | Aris | Groups | Real Betis | Spain | 0-1 | 1-4 | 4th place | |
| 2023–24 | Aris | Groups | Sparta Prague | Czech Republic | 1-3 | 2-3 | 4th place | |
| 2024–25 | Pafos | First qualifying | IF Elfsborg | Sweden | 2-5 | 0-3 | 2-8 | |
| 2024–25 | APOEL | Play-off | RFS | Latvia | 2-1 (a.e.t.) | 1-2 | 3-3 (2-4 p) | |
| 2025–26 | AEK | First qualifying | Partizan | Serbia | 1-0 | 1-2 (a.e.t.) | 2-2 (6-5 p) | |
| 2025–26 | AEK | Second qualifying | Celje | Slovenia | 2-1 | 1-1 | 3-2 | |
| 2025–26 | AEK | Third qualifying | Legia Warsaw | Poland | 4-1 | 1-2 | 5-3 | |
| 2025–26 | AEK | Play-off | Brann | Norway | 0-4 | 1-2 | 1-6 | |

^{EL1: The home matches of Cypriot teams were not take place in Cyprus but in their opponents country, but not at opponents' ground.}
^{EL2: The home matches of Cypriot teams were not take place in Cyprus but in their opponents country, at opponents' ground.}
^{EL3: The team started the season at UEFA Champions League but eliminated and continued to UEFA Cup/Europa League.}
^{EL4: Ethnikos Achna took part to UEFA Cup after qualified from Intertoto Cup.}
^{EL5: Although APOEL eliminated at Europa League's Play-Off, after a draw between the eliminated teams to replace Fenerbahçe S.K. which had panished from Court of Arbitration for Sport, APOEL was the team that drawn to take the place of the Turkish team.}
^{EL6: The Armenian team was represented Soviet Union.}
^{EL7: The Czech team was represented Czechoslovakia.}

== UEFA Cup Winners' Cup ==
Cypriot teams participated to UEFA Cup Winners' Cup from 1963–64 season until 1998–99 season when the competition was abolished. At the competition only the Cypriot Cup winner was taking part or the finalist of the cup if the cup winner was also the champion (so had qualified to European Cup/UEFA Champions League).

The first match of a Cypriot team in any European competition was in 1963–64 European Cup Winners' Cup, when APOEL faced SK Gjøvik-Lyn at GSP Stadium (1902). Ten different teams had taken part to the competition. The best result came from Apollon Limassol at the last season of the competition, at 1998–99 UEFA Cup Winners' Cup, when for the first time a Cypriot team eliminated two teams and participated in the second round.

Only in 1974–75 season no Cypriot team took part in the competition. As a result of Turkish invasion of Cyprus, the three teams that qualified to European competition withdrew. In UEFA Cup Winners' Cup that team was Enosis Neon Paralimni.

The table presents the statistic of Cypriot teams in the competition.

Statistics of Cypriots teams at UEFA Cup Winners' Cup.
| | | | | Home | | | | | | Amay | | | | | | Total | | | | | |
| Team | P | Pld | Q | W | D | L | GF | GA | Pts | W | D | L | GF | GA | Pts | W | D | L | GF | GA | Pts |
|---|---|---|---|---|---|---|---|---|---|---|---|---|---|---|---|---|---|---|---|---|---|
| APOEL | 10 | 30 | 5 | 5 | 2 | 8 | 20 | 14 | 17 | 1 | 4 | 10 | 7 | 64 | 7 | 6 | 6 | 18 | 27 | 78 | 24 |
| Apollon | 6 | 16 | 2 | 2 | 2 | 4 | 9 | 14 | 8 | 1 | 0 | 7 | 7 | 36 | 3 | 3 | 2 | 11 | 16 | 50 | 11 |
| Omonia | 5 | 12 | 1 | 1 | 0 | 5 | 5 | 11 | 3 | 1 | 1 | 4 | 2 | 12 | 4 | 2 | 1 | 9 | 7 | 23 | 7 |
| AEK | 1 | 4 | 1 | 1 | 1 | 0 | 5 | 0 | 4 | 0 | 0 | 2 | 0 | 3 | 0 | 1 | 1 | 2 | 5 | 3 | 4 |
| AEL | 3 | 6 | 0 | 1 | 1 | 1 | 3 | 3 | 4 | 0 | 0 | 3 | 1 | 12 | 0 | 1 | 1 | 4 | 4 | 15 | 4 |
| Enosis Neon Paralimni | 2 | 4 | 0 | 1 | 0 | 1 | 3 | 4 | 3 | 0 | 0 | 2 | 1 | 11 | 0 | 1 | 0 | 3 | 4 | 15 | 3 |
| Pezoporikos | 3 | 6 | 0 | 0 | 2 | 1 | 1 | 2 | 2 | 0 | 0 | 3 | 1 | 23 | 0 | 0 | 2 | 4 | 2 | 25 | 2 |
| Anorthosis | 3 | 6 | 0 | 0 | 1 | 2 | 1 | 8 | 1 | 0 | 0 | 3 | 0 | 26 | 0 | 0 | 1 | 5 | 1 | 34 | 1 |
| Nea Salamis | 1 | 2 | 0 | 0 | 0 | 1 | 0 | 2 | 0 | 0 | 0 | 1 | 0 | 3 | 0 | 0 | 0 | 2 | 0 | 5 | 0 |
| Olympiakos | 1 | 2 | 0 | 0 | 0 | 1 | 1 | 6 | 0 | 0 | 0 | 1 | 0 | 2 | 0 | 0 | 0 | 2 | 1 | 8 | 0 |
| Total | 35 | 88 | 9 | 11 | 9 | 24 | 48 | 64 | 42 | 3 | 5 | 36 | 19 | 192 | 14 | 14 | 14 | 60 | 67 | 256 | 56 |

For purposes of comparison the calculated rating system used is: win = 3 points, draw = 1 point, defeat = 0 points.

The table presents the participation of Cypriot teams in the competitions per season.

Cypriot football clubs in UEFA Cup Winners' Cup.
| Season | Team | Round | Opponent | Country | Home | Away | Agg. | Result |
|---|---|---|---|---|---|---|---|---|
| 1963–64 | APOEL | Preliminary | SK Gjøvik-Lyn | Norway | 6–0 | 1–0 | 7–0 | |
| 1963–64 | APOEL | First Round | Sporting Clube de Portugal | Portugal | 0–2^{CW2} | 1–16 | 1–18 | |
| 1964–65 | Anorthosis | Preliminary | AC Sparta Prague | Czech Republic^{CW3} | 0–6^{CW1} | 0–10 | 0–16 | |
| 1965–66 | Omonia | First Round | Olympiacos F.C. | Greece | 0–1 | 1–1 | 1–2 | |
| 1966–67 | Apollon | First Round | Standard Liège | Belgium | 0–1^{CW1} | 1–5 | 1–6 | |
| 1967–68 | Apollon | First Round | Győri ETO FC | Hungary | 0–4^{CW1} | 0–5 | 0–9 | |
| 1968–69 | APOEL | First Round | Dunfermline Athletic F.C. | Scotland | 0–2 | 1–10 | 1–12 | |
| 1969–70 | APOEL | First Round | Lierse S.K. | Belgium | 0–1^{CW2} | 1–10 | 1–11 | |
| 1970–71 | Pezoporikos | First Round | Cardiff City F.C. | Wales | 0–0 | 0–8 | 0–8 | |
| 1971–72 | Anorthosis | First Round | K. Beerschot V.A.C. | Belgium | 0–1^{CW2} | 0–7 | 0–8 | |
| 1972–73 | Pezoporikos | First Round | Cork Hibernians F.C. | Ireland | 1–2^{CW2} | 1–4 | 2–6 | |
| 1973–74 | Pezoporikos | First Round | Malmö FF | Sweden | 0–0 | 0–11 | 0–11 | |
| 1974–75 | Enosis Neon Paralimni | First Round | FC Avenir Beggen | Luxembourg | Withdrew due to Turkish invasion of Cyprus | | | |
| 1975–76 | Anorthosis | First Round | FC Ararat Yerevan | Armenia^{CW4} | 1–1 | 0–9 | 1–10 | |
| 1976–77 | APOEL | First Round | Iraklis | Greece | 2–0 | 0–0 | 2–0 | |
| 1976–77 | APOEL | Second Round | S.S.C. Napoli | Italy | 1–1 | 0–2 | 1–3 | |
| 1977–78 | Olympiakos | First Round | FC Universitatea Craiova | Romania | 1–6 | 0–2 | 1–8 | |
| 1978–79 | APOEL | First Round | Shamrock Rovers F.C. | Ireland | 0–1 | 0–2 | 0–3 | |
| 1979–80 | APOEL | Preliminary | Boldklubben 1903 | Denmark | 0–1 | 0–6 | 0–7 | |
| 1980–81 | Omonia | First Round | K. Waterschei S.V. Thor Genk | Belgium | 1–3 | 0–4 | 1–7 | |
| 1981–82 | Enosis Neon Paralimni | First Round | Vasas SC | Hungary | 1–0 | 0–8 | 1–8 | |
| 1982–83 | Apollon | First Round | FC Barcelona | Spain | 1–1 | 0–8 | 1–9 | |
| 1983–84 | Enosis Neon Paralimni | First Round | K.S.K. Beveren | Belgium | 2–4 | 1–3 | 3–7 | |
| 1984–85 | APOEL | First Round | Servette FC | Switzerland | 0–3 | 1–3 | 1–6 | |
| 1985–86 | AEL | First Round | Dukla Prague | Czech Republic^{CW3} | 2–2 | 0–4 | 2–6 | |
| 1986–87 | Apollon | First Round | Malmö FF | Sweden | 2–1 | 0–6 | 2–7 | |
| 1987–88 | AEL | Preliminary | FC DAC 1904 Dunajská Streda | Slovakia^{CW5} | 0–1 | 1–5 | 1–6 | |
| 1988–89 | Omonia | First Round | Panathinaikos F.C. | Greece | 0–1 | 0–2 | 0–3 | |
| 1989–90 | AEL | First Round | FC Admira Wacker Mödling | Austria | 1–0 | 0–3 | 1–3 | |
| 1990–91 | Nea Salamis | First Round | Aberdeen F.C. | Scotland | 0–2 | 0–3 | 0–5 | |
| 1991–92 | Omonia | First Round | Club Brugge KV | Belgium | 0–2 | 0–2 | 0–4 | |
| 1992–93 | Apollon | First Round | Liverpool F.C. | England | 1–2 | 1–6 | 2–8 | |
| 1993–94 | APOEL | Preliminary | Bangor F.C. | Northern Ireland | 2–1 | 1–1 | 3–2 | |
| 1993–94 | APOEL | First Round | Paris Saint-Germain F.C. | France | 0–1 | 0–2 | 0–3 | |
| 1994–95 | Omonia | Preliminary | CS Tiligul-Tiras Tiraspol | Moldova | 3–1 | 1–0 | 3–1 | |
| 1994–95 | Omonia | First Round | Arsenal F.C. | England | 1–3 | 0–3 | 1–6 | |
| 1995–96 | APOEL | Preliminary | Neftçi PFK | Azerbaijan | 3–0 | 0–0 | 3–0 | |
| 1995–96 | APOEL | First Round | Deportivo de La Coruña | Spain | 0–0 | 0–8 | 0–8 | |
| 1996–97 | AEK | Preliminary | FC Kotayk | Armenia | 5–0 | 0–1 | 5–1 | |
| 1996–97 | AEK | First Round | FC Barcelona | Spain | 0–0 | 0–2 | 0–2 | |
| 1997–98 | APOEL | Preliminary | Havnar Bóltfelag | Faroe Islands | 6–0 | 1–1 | 7–1 | |
| 1997–98 | APOEL | First Round | SK Sturm Graz | Austria | 0–1 | 0–3 | 0–4 | |
| 1998–99 | Apollon | Preliminary | FK Ekranas | Lithuania | 3–3 | 2–1 | 5–4 | |
| 1998–99 | Apollon | First Round | FK Jablonec | Czech Republic | 2–1 | 1–2 (4–3 pen) | 3–3 | |
| 1998–99 | Apollon | Second Round | Panionios F.C. | Greece | 0–1 | 2–3 | 2–4 | |

^{CW1: The home matches of Cypriot teams were not take place in Cyprus but in their opponents country, but not at opponents' ground.}
^{CW2: The home matches of Cypriot teams were not take place in Cyprus but in their opponents country, at opponents' ground.}
^{CW3: The Czech teams was represented Czechoslovakia.}
^{CW4: The Armenian teams was represented Soviet Union.}
^{CW5: The Slovak team was represented Czechoslovakia.}

== UEFA Intertoto Cup ==
UEFA Intertoto Cup was taken over by UEFA at 1995. That season the Cypriot teams began to participate in the competition, until 2008 when the competition abolished. Only in 1999 UEFA Intertoto Cup no Cypriot team took part.

In the middle of every football season, any Cypriot teams wanted to take part in Intertoto, declare their nomination and the one of them that finished in the highest position at Cypriot First Division qualified to Intertoto Cup.

In total, Cypriot teams took part in 13 of the 14 seasons of the competition held by UEFA. Every season only one Cypriot team took part except of 2003 UEFA Intertoto Cup when two teams took part. At 1995, 1996 and 1997 the teams were started from group stage of five teams, giving two home and two away matches. The two first team were qualified. From 1998 until 2005 the competition held with a knockout system. The final three winners of the competitions qualified to UEFA Cup. From 2006 yo 2008 competition also held with a knockout system but the winners that qualified to UEFA Cup increase to 11, and so more teams were able to qualified.

Most successful Cypriot team was Ethnikos Achna, at 2006. According to UEFA website, Ethnikos Achna considered as a winner of 2006 UEFA Intertoto Cup, because that year the winners were the 11 teams that qualified to 2006–07 UEFA Cup.

The table presents the statistic of Cypriot teams in the competition.

Statistics of Cypriots teams at UEFA Intertoto Cup.
| | | | | Home | | | | | | Amay | | | | | | Total | | | | | |
| Team | P | Pld | Q | W | D | L | GF | GA | Pts | W | D | L | GF | GA | Pts | W | D | L | GF | GA | Pts |
|---|---|---|---|---|---|---|---|---|---|---|---|---|---|---|---|---|---|---|---|---|---|
| Ethnikos Achna | 6 | 16 | 3 | 3 | 3 | 2 | 13 | 14 | 12 | 1 | 3 | 4 | 7 | 16 | 6 | 4 | 6 | 6 | 20 | 30 | 18 |
| Nea Salamis | 3 | 12 | 1 | 4 | 0 | 2 | 12 | 14 | 12 | 1 | 1 | 4 | 5 | 15 | 4 | 5 | 1 | 6 | 17 | 29 | 16 |
| Apollon | 1 | 4 | 0 | 1 | 0 | 1 | 4 | 3 | 3 | 0 | 0 | 2 | 0 | 10 | 0 | 1 | 0 | 3 | 4 | 13 | 3 |
| Enosis Neon Paralimni | 2 | 4 | 0 | 0 | 0 | 2 | 1 | 9 | 0 | 0 | 0 | 2 | 0 | 14 | 0 | 0 | 0 | 4 | 1 | 23 | 0 |
| Anorthosis | 1 | 2 | 0 | 0 | 0 | 1 | 0 | 2 | 0 | 0 | 0 | 1 | 1 | 3 | 0 | 0 | 0 | 2 | 1 | 5 | 0 |
| Olympiakos | 1 | 2 | 0 | 0 | 0 | 1 | 0 | 2 | 0 | 0 | 0 | 1 | 0 | 7 | 0 | 0 | 0 | 2 | 0 | 9 | 0 |
| Total | 14 | 40 | 4 | 8 | 3 | 9 | 30 | 44 | 27 | 2 | 4 | 14 | 13 | 65 | 10 | 10 | 7 | 23 | 43 | 109 | 37 |

For purposes of comparison the calculated rating system used is: win = 3 points, draw = 1 point, defeat = 0 points.

The table presents the participation of Cypriot teams in the competitions per season.

Cypriot football clubs in UEFA Intertoto Cup.
| Season | Team | Round | Opponent | Country | Home | Away | Agg. | Result |
|---|---|---|---|---|---|---|---|---|
| 1995 | Nea Salamis | Group^{I1} | OFI Crete F.C. | Greece | – | 1–2 | 3rd place | |
| 1995 | Nea Salamis | Group^{I1} | JK Tervis Pärnu | Estonia | 2–0 | – | 3rd place | |
| 1995 | Nea Salamis | Group^{I1} | FK Budućnost Podgorica | Montenegro^{I3} | – | 1–1 | 3rd place | |
| 1995 | Nea Salamis | Group^{I1} | Bayer 04 Leverkusen | Germany | 0–2 | – | 3rd place | |
| 1996 | Apollon | Group^{I1} | SV Werder Bremen | Germany | 0–2 | – | 4th place | |
| 1996 | Apollon | Group^{I1} | Djurgårdens IF Fotboll | Sweden | – | 0–8 | 4th place | |
| 1996 | Apollon | Group^{I1} | B68 Toftir | Faroe Islands | 4–1 | – | 4th place | |
| 1996 | Apollon | Group^{I1} | LASK Linz | Austria | – | 0–2 | 4th place | |
| 1997 | Nea Salamis | Group^{I1} | FC Lausanne-Sport | Switzerland | – | 1–4 | 4th place | |
| 1997 | Nea Salamis | Group^{I1} | Ards F.C. | Northern Ireland | 4–1 | – | 4th place | |
| 1997 | Nea Salamis | Group^{I1} | Royal Antwerp F.C. | Belgium | – | 0–4 | 4th place | |
| 1997 | Nea Salamis | Group^{I1} | AJ Auxerre | France | 1–10 | – | 4th place | |
| 1998 | Ethnikos Achna | First Round | Örgryte IS | Sweden | 2–1 | 0–4 | 2–5 | |
| 1999 | No team took part. | | | | | | | |
| 2000 | Nea Salamis | First Round | KF Vllaznia Shkodër | Albania | 4–1 | 2–1 | 6–2 | |
| 2000 | Nea Salamis | Second Round | FK Austria Wien | Austria | 1–0 | 0–3 | 1–3 | |
| 2001 | Anorthosis | First Round | NK Slaven Belupo | Croatia | 0–2 | 0–7 | 0–9 | |
| 2002 | Enosis Neon Paralimni | First Round | SC Bregenz | Austria | 0–2 | 1–3 | 1–5 | |
| 2003 | Ethnikos Achna | First Round | Győri ETO FC | Hungary | 2–2 | 1–1 | 3–3 | |
| 2003 | Olympiakos | First Round | FK Dubnica | Slovakia | 1–4 | 0–3 | 1–7 | |
| 2004 | Ethnikos Achna | First Round | FK Vardar | Macedonia | 1–5 | 1–5 | 2–10 | |
| 2005 | Olympiakos | First Round | AF Gloria Bistrița | Romania | 0–5 | 0–11 | 0–16 | |
| 2006 | Ethnikos Achna | First Round | FK Partizani Tirana | Albania | 4–2 | 1–2 | 5–4 | |
| 2006 | Ethnikos Achna | Second Round | NK Osijek | Croatia | 0–0 | 2–2 | 2–2 | |
| 2006 | Ethnikos Achna | Third Round | Maccabi Petah Tikva F.C. | Israel | 2–3 | 2–0 | 4–3 | ^{I2} |
| 2007 | Ethnikos Achna | First Round | FK Makedonija Gjorče Petrov | Macedonia | 1–0 | 0–2 | 1–2 | |
| 2008 | Ethnikos Achna | First Round | Besa Kavajë | Albania | 1–1 | 0–0 | 1–1 | |

^{I1: At 1995, 1996 and 1997 teams were started from group stage of five teams, giving two home and two away matches. The two first team were qualified.}
^{I2:Ethnikos Achna continue to UEFA Cup.}
^{I3:The team from Montenegro was represented Serbia and Montenegro.}

== Statistics 1963–2017 ==
Last update: April 14, 2018

=== Total participations ===
The table below presents the statistic of all teams in all competitions.

| | | | | Home | | | | | | Away | | | | | | Total | | | | | |
| Club | Prt | Pld | Q | W | D | L | GF | GA | Pts | W | D | L | GF | GA | Pts | W | D | L | GF | GA | Pts |
|---|---|---|---|---|---|---|---|---|---|---|---|---|---|---|---|---|---|---|---|---|---|
| APOEL FC | 43 | 196 | 39 | 44 | 21 | 33 | 140 | 114 | 153 | 17 | 26 | 55 | 80 | 189 | 77 | 61 | 47 | 88 | 220 | 303 | 230 |
| AC Omonia | 42 | 132 | 24 | 31 | 16 | 19 | 117 | 74 | 109 | 16 | 9 | 41 | 65 | 143 | 57 | 47 | 25 | 60 | 182 | 217 | 166 |
| Anorthosis Famagusta FC | 29 | 102 | 20 | 24 | 9 | 18 | 83 | 61 | 81 | 11 | 6 | 34 | 41 | 131 | 39 | 35 | 15 | 52 | 124 | 192 | 120 |
| Apollon Limassol FC | 21 | 84 | 14 | 16 | 11 | 15 | 64 | 59 | 59 | 7 | 6 | 29 | 41 | 112 | 27 | 23 | 17 | 44 | 105 | 171 | 86 |
| AEK Larnaca FC | 6 | 36 | 10 | 11 | 4 | 3 | 31 | 11 | 37 | 5 | 5 | 8 | 22 | 27 | 20 | 16 | 9 | 11 | 53 | 38 | 57 |
| AEL Limassol | 10 | 32 | 4 | 9 | 2 | 5 | 25 | 17 | 29 | 3 | 2 | 11 | 8 | 39 | 11 | 12 | 4 | 16 | 33 | 56 | 40 |
| Ethnikos Achna FC | 7 | 20 | 4 | 4 | 4 | 2 | 18 | 14 | 16 | 1 | 3 | 6 | 9 | 21 | 6 | 5 | 7 | 8 | 27 | 35 | 22 |
| Nea Salamis Famagusta FC | 4 | 14 | 1 | 4 | 0 | 3 | 12 | 16 | 12 | 1 | 1 | 5 | 5 | 18 | 4 | 5 | 1 | 8 | 17 | 34 | 16 |
| Olympiakos Nicosia | 8 | 18 | 1 | 0 | 3 | 6 | 8 | 42 | 3 | 1 | 0 | 8 | 7 | 51 | 3 | 1 | 3 | 14 | 15 | 93 | 6 |
| Pezoporikos Larnaca FC | 7 | 14 | 0 | 0 | 4 | 3 | 7 | 12 | 4 | 0 | 0 | 7 | 3 | 40 | 0 | 0 | 4 | 10 | 10 | 52 | 4 |
| Enosis Neon Paralimni FC | 5 | 10 | 0 | 1 | 0 | 4 | 6 | 12 | 3 | 0 | 0 | 5 | 3 | 29 | 0 | 1 | 0 | 9 | 9 | 41 | 3 |
| APOP Kinyras FC | 1 | 2 | 0 | 0 | 1 | 0 | 2 | 2 | 1 | 0 | 0 | 1 | 1 | 2 | 0 | 0 | 1 | 1 | 3 | 4 | 1 |
| Ermis Aradippou FC | 1 | 2 | 0 | 0 | 0 | 1 | 0 | 2 | 0 | 0 | 0 | 1 | 0 | 1 | 0 | 0 | 0 | 2 | 0 | 3 | 0 |
| Digenis Akritas Morphou FC | 1 | 2 | 0 | 0 | 0 | 1 | 0 | 3 | 0 | 0 | 0 | 1 | 0 | 4 | 0 | 0 | 0 | 2 | 0 | 7 | 0 |
| Alki Larnaca FC | 1 | 2 | 0 | 0 | 0 | 1 | 0 | 9 | 0 | 0 | 0 | 1 | 0 | 3 | 0 | 0 | 0 | 2 | 0 | 12 | 0 |
| EPA Larnaca FC | 3 | 6 | 0 | 0 | 0 | 3 | 0 | 8 | 0 | 0 | 0 | 3 | 0 | 14 | 0 | 0 | 0 | 6 | 0 | 22 | 0 |
| Total | 189 | 672 | 117 | 144 | 75 | 117 | 513 | 456 | 507 | 62 | 58 | 216 | 285 | 824 | 244 | 206 | 133 | 333 | 798 | 1280 | 751 |

For purposes of comparison the calculated rating system used is: win = 3 points, draw = 1 point, defeat = 0 points.

Anorthosis Famagusta FC (1997-1998, 1998-1999, 1999-2000, 2005-2006) and APOEL FC (2002-2003, 2013-2014, 2015–16, 2016–17) in four seasons, AEL Limassol (2012–13, 2014–15) in two seasons, AC Omonia (2010-2011) and Ethnikos Achna FC (2006-2007) in one season, played in two competitions the same season, entries which are aggregated in the final set.

=== Statistics per country ===
Cypriot teams have faced opponents from 49 different countries (UEFA has 55 federations members, including Cyprus); Cypriot clubs have not yet faced opponents from Andorra, Kosovo, Latvia and Liechtenstein. Clubs that belonged to Soviet Union, Yugoslavia, Czechoslovakia and East Germany have been allocated to the federations belonging today.

| Country | Pld | Q | E | Home | | | | | | Amay | | | | | | Total | | | | | |
| Country | Pld | Q | E | W | D | L | GF | GA | Pts | W | D | L | GF | GA | Pts | W | D | L | GF | GA | Pts |
|---|---|---|---|---|---|---|---|---|---|---|---|---|---|---|---|---|---|---|---|---|---|
| Albania | 14 | 6 | 1 | 6 | 1 | 0 | 22 | 7 | 19 | 4 | 1 | 2 | 14 | 9 | 13 | 10 | 2 | 2 | 36 | 16 | 32 |
| Andorra | 0 | 0 | 0 | 0 | 0 | 0 | 0 | 0 | 0 | 0 | 0 | 0 | 0 | 0 | 0 | 0 | 0 | 0 | 0 | 0 | 0 |
| Armenia | 14 | 5 | 2 | 5 | 1 | 1 | 18 | 3 | 16 | 3 | 1 | 3 | 6 | 13 | 10 | 8 | 2 | 4 | 24 | 16 | 26 |
| Austria | 25 | 2 | 10 | 6 | 2 | 4 | 18 | 13 | 20 | 0 | 2 | 11 | 5 | 33 | 2 | 6 | 4 | 15 | 23 | 46 | 22 |
| Azerbaijan | 6 | 1 | 2 | 1 | 1 | 1 | 5 | 4 | 4 | 0 | 2 | 1 | 1 | 2 | 2 | 1 | 3 | 2 | 6 | 6 | 6 |
| Belarus | 8 | 3 | 1 | 4 | 0 | 0 | 8 | 0 | 12 | 1 | 2 | 1 | 7 | 6 | 5 | 5 | 2 | 1 | 15 | 6 | 17 |
| Belgium | 37 | 2 | 16 | 4 | 4 | 10 | 20 | 24 | 16 | 0 | 1 | 18 | 8 | 65 | 1 | 4 | 5 | 28 | 28 | 89 | 17 |
| Bosnia and Herzegovina | 6 | 0 | 3 | 0 | 1 | 2 | 5 | 10 | 1 | 0 | 0 | 3 | 1 | 5 | 0 | 0 | 1 | 5 | 6 | 15 | 1 |
| Bulgaria | 18 | 2 | 7 | 3 | 6 | 0 | 14 | 7 | 15 | 1 | 0 | 8 | 9 | 21 | 3 | 4 | 6 | 8 | 23 | 28 | 18 |
| Croatia | 8 | 3 | 1 | 1 | 1 | 2 | 2 | 5 | 4 | 1 | 2 | 1 | 7 | 11 | 5 | 2 | 3 | 3 | 9 | 16 | 9 |
| Czech Republic | 22 | 4 | 6 | 4 | 4 | 3 | 15 | 17 | 16 | 1 | 2 | 8 | 9 | 35 | 5 | 5 | 6 | 11 | 24 | 52 | 21 |
| Denmark | 14 | 4 | 3 | 3 | 2 | 2 | 13 | 8 | 11 | 1 | 3 | 3 | 4 | 11 | 6 | 4 | 5 | 5 | 17 | 19 | 17 |
| England | 16 | 0 | 5 | 0 | 1 | 7 | 5 | 17 | 1 | 0 | 2 | 6 | 7 | 27 | 2 | 0 | 3 | 13 | 12 | 44 | 3 |
| Estonia | 5 | 2 | 0 | 3 | 0 | 0 | 6 | 0 | 9 | 1 | 1 | 0 | 3 | 1 | 4 | 4 | 1 | 0 | 9 | 1 | 13 |
| Faroe Islands | 9 | 4 | 0 | 5 | 0 | 0 | 21 | 3 | 15 | 3 | 1 | 0 | 12 | 3 | 10 | 8 | 1 | 0 | 33 | 6 | 25 |
| Finland | 8 | 3 | 1 | 4 | 0 | 0 | 8 | 0 | 12 | 0 | 2 | 2 | 5 | 9 | 2 | 4 | 2 | 2 | 13 | 9 | 14 |
| France | 19 | 2 | 3 | 4 | 2 | 4 | 10 | 15 | 14 | 0 | 0 | 9 | 3 | 22 | 0 | 4 | 2 | 13 | 13 | 37 | 14 |
| Georgia | 6 | 2 | 1 | 2 | 0 | 1 | 5 | 3 | 6 | 1 | 0 | 2 | 1 | 3 | 3 | 3 | 0 | 3 | 6 | 6 | 9 |
| Germany | 48 | 0 | 16 | 1 | 5 | 19 | 14 | 63 | 8 | 0 | 4 | 19 | 5 | 102 | 4 | 1 | 9 | 38 | 19 | 165 | 12 |
| Gibraltar | 4 | 2 | 0 | 2 | 0 | 0 | 11 | 0 | 6 | 1 | 1 | 0 | 5 | 1 | 4 | 3 | 1 | 0 | 16 | 1 | 10 |
| Greece | 31 | 5 | 7 | 7 | 2 | 6 | 25 | 20 | 23 | 3 | 4 | 9 | 12 | 21 | 13 | 10 | 6 | 15 | 37 | 41 | 36 |
| Hungary | 12 | 2 | 4 | 3 | 2 | 1 | 11 | 9 | 11 | 1 | 1 | 4 | 5 | 22 | 4 | 4 | 3 | 5 | 16 | 31 | 15 |
| Iceland | 2 | 0 | 1 | 1 | 0 | 0 | 2 | 1 | 3 | 0 | 0 | 1 | 0 | 4 | 0 | 1 | 0 | 1 | 2 | 5 | 3 |
| Republic of Ireland | 14 | 3 | 4 | 3 | 2 | 2 | 7 | 5 | 11 | 2 | 0 | 5 | 4 | 10 | 6 | 5 | 2 | 7 | 11 | 15 | 17 |
| Israel | 12 | 2 | 2 | 4 | 1 | 1 | 11 | 6 | 13 | 1 | 2 | 3 | 4 | 8 | 5 | 5 | 3 | 4 | 15 | 14 | 18 |
| Italy | 24 | 0 | 9 | 0 | 6 | 6 | 12 | 30 | 6 | 0 | 0 | 12 | 4 | 36 | 0 | 0 | 6 | 18 | 16 | 66 | 6 |
| Kazakhstan | 6 | 1 | 1 | 1 | 2 | 0 | 3 | 2 | 5 | 1 | 0 | 2 | 3 | 5 | 3 | 2 | 2 | 2 | 6 | 7 | 8 |
| Kosovo | 0 | 0 | 0 | 0 | 0 | 0 | 0 | 0 | 0 | 0 | 0 | 0 | 0 | 0 | 0 | 0 | 0 | 0 | 0 | 0 | 0 |
| Latvia | 0 | 0 | 0 | 0 | 0 | 0 | 0 | 0 | 0 | 0 | 0 | 0 | 0 | 0 | 0 | 0 | 0 | 0 | 0 | 0 | 0 |
| Liechtenstein | 0 | 0 | 0 | 0 | 0 | 0 | 0 | 0 | 0 | 0 | 0 | 0 | 0 | 0 | 0 | 0 | 0 | 0 | 0 | 0 | 0 |
| Lithuania | 8 | 4 | 0 | 3 | 1 | 0 | 13 | 4 | 10 | 2 | 2 | 0 | 6 | 2 | 8 | 5 | 3 | 0 | 19 | 6 | 18 |
| Luxembourg | 10 | 5 | 0 | 5 | 0 | 0 | 17 | 2 | 15 | 3 | 0 | 2 | 5 | 5 | 9 | 8 | 0 | 2 | 22 | 7 | 24 |
| Malta | 12 | 6 | 0 | 6 | 0 | 0 | 22 | 0 | 18 | 6 | 0 | 0 | 22 | 1 | 18 | 12 | 0 | 0 | 44 | 1 | 36 |
| Moldova | 6 | 3 | 0 | 3 | 0 | 0 | 8 | 1 | 9 | 3 | 0 | 0 | 5 | 1 | 9 | 6 | 0 | 0 | 13 | 2 | 18 |
| Montenegro | 7 | 2 | 1 | 2 | 1 | 0 | 4 | 1 | 7 | 2 | 1 | 1 | 6 | 4 | 7 | 4 | 2 | 1 | 10 | 5 | 14 |
| Netherlands | 10 | 1 | 3 | 2 | 1 | 2 | 8 | 13 | 7 | 0 | 0 | 5 | 0 | 25 | 0 | 2 | 1 | 7 | 8 | 38 | 7 |
| Northern Ireland | 11 | 5 | 0 | 6 | 0 | 0 | 18 | 4 | 18 | 2 | 2 | 1 | 10 | 8 | 8 | 8 | 2 | 1 | 28 | 12 | 26 |
| Norway | 8 | 4 | 0 | 4 | 0 | 0 | 13 | 2 | 12 | 2 | 1 | 1 | 3 | 2 | 7 | 6 | 1 | 1 | 16 | 4 | 19 |
| Poland | 12 | 2 | 3 | 3 | 2 | 1 | 9 | 7 | 11 | 1 | 1 | 4 | 4 | 13 | 4 | 4 | 3 | 5 | 13 | 20 | 15 |
| Portugal | 10 | 0 | 3 | 1 | 0 | 4 | 2 | 6 | 3 | 0 | 1 | 4 | 4 | 24 | 1 | 1 | 1 | 8 | 6 | 30 | 4 |
| North Macedonia | 20 | 7 | 3 | 7 | 1 | 2 | 16 | 7 | 22 | 6 | 2 | 2 | 14 | 11 | 20 | 13 | 3 | 4 | 30 | 18 | 42 |
| Romania | 32 | 3 | 12 | 4 | 5 | 7 | 18 | 33 | 17 | 1 | 2 | 13 | 10 | 46 | 5 | 5 | 7 | 20 | 28 | 79 | 22 |
| Russia | 14 | 2 | 4 | 3 | 2 | 2 | 9 | 8 | 11 | 2 | 2 | 3 | 7 | 11 | 8 | 5 | 4 | 5 | 16 | 19 | 19 |
| San Marino | 4 | 2 | 0 | 2 | 0 | 0 | 6 | 1 | 6 | 2 | 0 | 0 | 7 | 1 | 6 | 4 | 0 | 0 | 13 | 2 | 12 |
| Scotland | 10 | 1 | 4 | 1 | 1 | 3 | 3 | 6 | 4 | 0 | 0 | 5 | 2 | 18 | 0 | 1 | 1 | 8 | 5 | 24 | 4 |
| Serbia | 14 | 3 | 4 | 2 | 3 | 2 | 7 | 8 | 9 | 1 | 2 | 4 | 6 | 12 | 5 | 3 | 5 | 6 | 13 | 20 | 14 |
| Slovakia | 10 | 3 | 2 | 2 | 1 | 2 | 5 | 6 | 7 | 2 | 1 | 2 | 5 | 9 | 7 | 4 | 2 | 4 | 10 | 15 | 14 |
| Slovenia | 4 | 1 | 1 | 1 | 1 | 0 | 5 | 3 | 4 | 0 | 1 | 1 | 1 | 2 | 1 | 1 | 2 | 1 | 6 | 5 | 5 |
| Spain | 32 | 1 | 11 | 2 | 6 | 8 | 10 | 39 | 12 | 0 | 2 | 14 | 8 | 56 | 2 | 2 | 8 | 22 | 18 | 95 | 14 |
| Sweden | 11 | 0 | 5 | 3 | 1 | 1 | 8 | 4 | 10 | 0 | 0 | 6 | 1 | 38 | 0 | 3 | 1 | 7 | 9 | 42 | 10 |
| Switzerland | 21 | 0 | 8 | 3 | 1 | 6 | 13 | 20 | 10 | 1 | 1 | 9 | 10 | 29 | 4 | 4 | 2 | 15 | 23 | 49 | 14 |
| Turkey | 8 | 1 | 1 | 1 | 1 | 2 | 5 | 5 | 4 | 0 | 0 | 4 | 2 | 8 | 0 | 1 | 1 | 6 | 7 | 13 | 4 |
| Ukraine | 6 | 0 | 2 | 0 | 0 | 3 | 0 | 4 | 0 | 0 | 2 | 1 | 3 | 5 | 2 | 0 | 2 | 4 | 3 | 9 | 2 |
| Wales | 4 | 1 | 1 | 1 | 1 | 0 | 3 | 0 | 4 | 0 | 1 | 1 | 0 | 8 | 1 | 1 | 2 | 1 | 3 | 8 | 5 |
| Total | 672 | 117 | 174 | 144 | 75 | 117 | 513 | 456 | 507 | 62 | 58 | 216 | 285 | 824 | 244 | 206 | 133 | 333 | 798 | 1280 | 751 |

For purposes of comparison the calculated rating system used is: win = 3 points, draw = 1 point, defeat = 0 points.

The matches for the group stage are included in the list, but not in the column "Qualifications" and "Exclusion" because they were not knockout matches.

1974–75 season's opponents in which Omonia, Pezoporikos and Enosis Neon Paralimni withdrew and 1986–87 season's opponent of APOEL when the club refused to participate in the second round) are not included and are not added in the column "Exclusions".

=== Statistics per season ===
The table presents the statistics of all teams per season.

| | | | | Home | | | | | | Amay | | | | | | Total | | | | | | |
| Season | Teams | Pld | Q | W | D | L | GF | GA | Pts | W | D | L | GF | GA | Pts | W | D | L | GF | GA | GD | Pts |
|---|---|---|---|---|---|---|---|---|---|---|---|---|---|---|---|---|---|---|---|---|---|---|
| 1963-1964 | 2 | 6 | 1 | 1 | 0 | 2 | 7 | 5 | 3 | 1 | 0 | 2 | 2 | 19 | 3 | 2 | 0 | 4 | 9 | 24 | -15 | 6 |
| 1964-1965 | 1 | 2 | 0 | 0 | 0 | 1 | 0 | 6 | 0 | 0 | 0 | 1 | 0 | 10 | 0 | 0 | 0 | 2 | 0 | 16 | -16 | 0 |
| 1965-1966 | 2 | 4 | 0 | 0 | 0 | 2 | 0 | 6 | 0 | 0 | 1 | 1 | 1 | 6 | 1 | 0 | 1 | 3 | 1 | 12 | -11 | 1 |
| 1966-1967 | 2 | 4 | 0 | 0 | 0 | 2 | 1 | 3 | 0 | 0 | 0 | 2 | 1 | 13 | 0 | 0 | 0 | 4 | 2 | 16 | -14 | 0 |
| 1967-1968 | 2 | 4 | 0 | 0 | 1 | 1 | 2 | 6 | 1 | 0 | 0 | 2 | 1 | 8 | 0 | 0 | 1 | 3 | 3 | 14 | -11 | 1 |
| 1968-1969 | 2 | 4 | 0 | 0 | 0 | 2 | 0 | 8 | 0 | 0 | 0 | 2 | 1 | 16 | 0 | 0 | 0 | 4 | 1 | 24 | -23 | 0 |
| 1969-1970 | 2 | 4 | 0 | 0 | 0 | 2 | 0 | 9 | 0 | 0 | 0 | 2 | 2 | 16 | 0 | 0 | 0 | 4 | 2 | 25 | -23 | 0 |
| 1970-1971 | 2 | 4 | 0 | 0 | 1 | 1 | 0 | 6 | 1 | 0 | 0 | 2 | 0 | 18 | 0 | 0 | 1 | 3 | 0 | 24 | -24 | 1 |
| 1971-1972 | 3 | 6 | 0 | 0 | 0 | 3 | 0 | 13 | 0 | 0 | 0 | 3 | 0 | 19 | 0 | 0 | 0 | 6 | 0 | 32 | -32 | 0 |
| 1972-1973 | 3 | 8 | 1 | 1 | 0 | 3 | 3 | 7 | 3 | 0 | 0 | 4 | 2 | 16 | 0 | 1 | 0 | 7 | 5 | 23 | -18 | 3 |
| 1973-1974 | 3 | 6 | 0 | 0 | 1 | 2 | 0 | 5 | 1 | 0 | 0 | 3 | 0 | 22 | 0 | 0 | 1 | 5 | 0 | 27 | -27 | 1 |
| 1974-1975 | 0 | 0 | 0 | 0 | 0 | 0 | 0 | 0 | 0 | 0 | 0 | 0 | 0 | 0 | 0 | 0 | 0 | 0 | 0 | 0 | 0 | 0 |
| 1975-1976 | 3 | 6 | 0 | 1 | 1 | 1 | 5 | 5 | 4 | 0 | 0 | 3 | 1 | 20 | 0 | 1 | 1 | 4 | 6 | 25 | -19 | 4 |
| 1976-1977 | 3 | 8 | 1 | 1 | 1 | 2 | 4 | 6 | 4 | 0 | 2 | 2 | 1 | 11 | 2 | 1 | 3 | 4 | 5 | 17 | -12 | 6 |
| 1977-1978 | 3 | 6 | 0 | 0 | 1 | 2 | 2 | 10 | 1 | 0 | 0 | 3 | 0 | 7 | 0 | 0 | 1 | 5 | 2 | 17 | -15 | 1 |
| 1978-1979 | 3 | 6 | 0 | 1 | 1 | 1 | 4 | 4 | 4 | 0 | 0 | 3 | 1 | 8 | 0 | 1 | 1 | 4 | 5 | 12 | -7 | 4 |
| 1979-1980 | 3 | 8 | 1 | 2 | 0 | 2 | 10 | 11 | 6 | 0 | 0 | 4 | 1 | 21 | 0 | 2 | 0 | 6 | 11 | 32 | -21 | 6 |
| 1980-1981 | 3 | 6 | 0 | 1 | 0 | 2 | 4 | 8 | 3 | 0 | 0 | 3 | 0 | 13 | 0 | 1 | 0 | 5 | 4 | 21 | -17 | 3 |
| 1981-1982 | 3 | 6 | 0 | 1 | 1 | 1 | 2 | 2 | 4 | 0 | 0 | 3 | 0 | 15 | 0 | 1 | 1 | 4 | 2 | 17 | -15 | 4 |
| 1982-1983 | 3 | 6 | 0 | 1 | 2 | 0 | 5 | 3 | 5 | 0 | 0 | 3 | 0 | 12 | 0 | 1 | 2 | 3 | 5 | 15 | -10 | 5 |
| 1983-1984 | 3 | 6 | 0 | 1 | 0 | 2 | 6 | 6 | 3 | 0 | 0 | 3 | 1 | 16 | 0 | 1 | 0 | 5 | 7 | 22 | -15 | 3 |
| 1984-1985 | 3 | 6 | 0 | 1 | 1 | 1 | 4 | 6 | 4 | 0 | 0 | 3 | 3 | 13 | 0 | 1 | 1 | 4 | 7 | 19 | -12 | 4 |
| 1985-1986 | 3 | 8 | 1 | 1 | 2 | 1 | 10 | 7 | 5 | 1 | 0 | 3 | 7 | 9 | 3 | 2 | 2 | 4 | 17 | 16 | 1 | 8 |
| 1986-1987 | 3 | 6 | 1 | 2 | 1 | 0 | 4 | 2 | 7 | 0 | 0 | 3 | 2 | 10 | 0 | 2 | 1 | 3 | 6 | 12 | -6 | 7 |
| 1987-1988 | 3 | 8 | 1 | 0 | 1 | 3 | 0 | 4 | 1 | 1 | 0 | 3 | 3 | 11 | 3 | 1 | 1 | 6 | 3 | 15 | -12 | 4 |
| 1988-1989 | 3 | 6 | 0 | 0 | 0 | 3 | 3 | 8 | 0 | 0 | 0 | 3 | 1 | 8 | 0 | 0 | 0 | 6 | 4 | 16 | -12 | 0 |
| 1989-1990 | 3 | 6 | 0 | 1 | 0 | 2 | 3 | 6 | 3 | 0 | 1 | 2 | 1 | 10 | 1 | 1 | 1 | 4 | 4 | 16 | -12 | 4 |
| 1990-1991 | 3 | 8 | 1 | 1 | 1 | 2 | 7 | 8 | 4 | 0 | 0 | 4 | 1 | 12 | 0 | 1 | 1 | 6 | 8 | 20 | -12 | 4 |
| 1991-1992 | 3 | 8 | 1 | 1 | 0 | 3 | 4 | 6 | 3 | 0 | 1 | 3 | 3 | 9 | 1 | 1 | 1 | 6 | 7 | 15 | -8 | 4 |
| 1992-1993 | 3 | 6 | 0 | 0 | 1 | 2 | 3 | 8 | 1 | 0 | 1 | 2 | 3 | 13 | 1 | 0 | 2 | 4 | 6 | 21 | -15 | 2 |
| 1993-1994 | 3 | 10 | 2 | 3 | 1 | 1 | 11 | 6 | 10 | 0 | 1 | 4 | 1 | 8 | 1 | 3 | 2 | 5 | 12 | 14 | -2 | 11 |
| 1994-1995 | 3 | 12 | 3 | 4 | 0 | 2 | 13 | 9 | 12 | 4 | 0 | 2 | 10 | 10 | 12 | 8 | 0 | 4 | 23 | 19 | 4 | 24 |
| 1995-1996 | 4 | 14 | 2 | 3 | 2 | 2 | 9 | 4 | 11 | 1 | 2 | 4 | 4 | 18 | 5 | 4 | 4 | 6 | 13 | 22 | -9 | 16 |
| 1996-1997 | 4 | 18 | 4 | 5 | 2 | 2 | 22 | 10 | 17 | 2 | 1 | 6 | 8 | 21 | 7 | 7 | 3 | 8 | 30 | 31 | -1 | 24 |
| 1997-1998 | 4 | 18 | 3 | 5 | 2 | 2 | 20 | 13 | 17 | 0 | 3 | 6 | 5 | 22 | 3 | 5 | 5 | 8 | 25 | 35 | -10 | 20 |
| 1998-1999 | 4 | 18 | 4 | 5 | 1 | 3 | 25 | 15 | 16 | 2 | 0 | 7 | 11 | 23 | 6 | 7 | 1 | 10 | 36 | 38 | -2 | 22 |
| 1999-2000 | 3 | 12 | 2 | 3 | 2 | 1 | 8 | 6 | 11 | 1 | 1 | 4 | 6 | 13 | 4 | 4 | 3 | 5 | 14 | 19 | -5 | 15 |
| 2000-2001 | 4 | 12 | 2 | 3 | 2 | 1 | 7 | 2 | 11 | 2 | 0 | 4 | 8 | 14 | 6 | 5 | 2 | 5 | 15 | 16 | -1 | 17 |
| 2001-2002 | 4 | 12 | 2 | 1 | 3 | 2 | 8 | 11 | 6 | 1 | 0 | 5 | 8 | 23 | 3 | 2 | 3 | 7 | 16 | 34 | -18 | 9 |
| 2002-2003 | 4 | 20 | 5 | 6 | 0 | 4 | 17 | 11 | 18 | 0 | 2 | 8 | 6 | 23 | 2 | 6 | 2 | 12 | 23 | 34 | -11 | 20 |
| 2003-2004 | 5 | 14 | 2 | 1 | 3 | 3 | 9 | 14 | 6 | 2 | 1 | 4 | 10 | 15 | 7 | 3 | 4 | 7 | 19 | 29 | -10 | 13 |
| 2004-2005 | 4 | 10 | 1 | 2 | 2 | 1 | 11 | 8 | 8 | 1 | 0 | 4 | 7 | 15 | 3 | 3 | 2 | 5 | 18 | 23 | -5 | 11 |
| 2005-2006 | 4 | 20 | 5 | 6 | 0 | 4 | 15 | 14 | 18 | 2 | 2 | 6 | 11 | 25 | 8 | 8 | 2 | 10 | 26 | 39 | -13 | 26 |
| 2006-2007 | 4 | 20 | 6 | 4 | 5 | 1 | 18 | 9 | 17 | 2 | 2 | 6 | 14 | 15 | 8 | 6 | 7 | 7 | 32 | 24 | 8 | 25 |
| 2007-2008 | 4 | 14 | 3 | 4 | 3 | 0 | 8 | 2 | 15 | 3 | 0 | 4 | 8 | 14 | 9 | 7 | 3 | 4 | 16 | 16 | 0 | 24 |
| 2008-2009 | 4 | 26 | 7 | 6 | 5 | 2 | 25 | 17 | 23 | 3 | 5 | 5 | 11 | 13 | 14 | 9 | 10 | 7 | 36 | 30 | 6 | 37 |
| 2009-2010 | 4 | 22 | 5 | 6 | 3 | 2 | 23 | 8 | 21 | 3 | 2 | 6 | 13 | 15 | 11 | 9 | 5 | 8 | 36 | 23 | 13 | 32 |
| 2010-2011 | 4 | 22 | 6 | 6 | 2 | 3 | 18 | 10 | 20 | 5 | 1 | 5 | 15 | 14 | 16 | 11 | 3 | 8 | 33 | 24 | 9 | 36 |
| 2011-2012 | 4 | 36 | 9 | 12 | 2 | 4 | 29 | 19 | 38 | 4 | 6 | 8 | 21 | 20 | 18 | 16 | 8 | 12 | 50 | 39 | 11 | 56 |
| 2012-2013 | 4 | 24 | 5 | 7 | 2 | 3 | 17 | 9 | 23 | 5 | 3 | 4 | 9 | 13 | 18 | 12 | 5 | 7 | 26 | 22 | 4 | 41 |
| 2013-2014 | 4 | 22 | 1 | 3 | 3 | 5 | 11 | 13 | 12 | 1 | 4 | 6 | 7 | 17 | 7 | 4 | 7 | 11 | 18 | 30 | -12 | 19 |
| 2014-2015 | 5 | 30 | 5 | 5 | 3 | 7 | 17 | 19 | 18 | 3 | 3 | 9 | 13 | 31 | 12 | 8 | 6 | 16 | 30 | 50 | -20 | 30 |
| 2015-2016 | 4 | 26 | 6 | 5 | 4 | 4 | 16 | 13 | 19 | 2 | 4 | 7 | 5 | 13 | 10 | 7 | 8 | 11 | 21 | 26 | -5 | 29 |
| 2016-2017 | 4 | 30 | 7 | 10 | 2 | 3 | 28 | 10 | 32 | 5 | 2 | 8 | 17 | 22 | 17 | 15 | 4 | 11 | 45 | 32 | 13 | 49 |
| 2017-2018 | 4 | 38 | 11 | 11 | 4 | 4 | 35 | 20 | 37 | 5 | 7 | 7 | 18 | 26 | 22 | 16 | 11 | 11 | 53 | 46 | 7 | 59 |
| Total | | 672 | 117 | 144 | 75 | 117 | 513 | 456 | 507 | 62 | 58 | 216 | 285 | 824 | 244 | 206 | 133 | 333 | 798 | 1280 | -482 | 751 |

For purposes of comparison the calculated rating system used is: win = 3 points, draw = 1 point, defeat = 0 points.

=== Statistics per opponent ===
Cypriot teams had faced 247 different opponents. The table below shoes the statistics per opponent.

| Club | Country | Pld | Q | E | Home | | | | | | Away | | | | | | Total | | | | | |
| Club | Country | Pld | Q | E | W | D | L | GF | GA | Pts | W | D | L | GF | GA | Pts | W | D | L | GF | GA | Pts |
|---|---|---|---|---|---|---|---|---|---|---|---|---|---|---|---|---|---|---|---|---|---|---|
| 1. FC Kaiserslautern | Germany | 2 | 0 | 1 | 0 | 0 | 1 | 1 | 3 | 0 | 0 | 0 | 1 | 0 | 8 | 0 | 0 | 0 | 2 | 1 | 11 | 0 |
| A.C. Milan | Italy | 2 | 0 | 1 | 0 | 0 | 1 | 0 | 3 | 0 | 0 | 0 | 1 | 0 | 4 | 0 | 0 | 0 | 2 | 0 | 7 | 0 |
| AaB | Denmark | 2 | 1 | 0 | 1 | 0 | 0 | 4 | 0 | 3 | 0 | 1 | 0 | 1 | 1 | 1 | 1 | 1 | 0 | 5 | 1 | 4 |
| Aalesunds FK | Norway | 2 | 1 | 0 | 1 | 0 | 0 | 2 | 1 | 3 | 1 | 0 | 0 | 1 | 0 | 3 | 2 | 0 | 0 | 3 | 1 | 6 |
| Aberdeen F.C. | Scotland | 4 | 1 | 1 | 1 | 0 | 1 | 2 | 2 | 3 | 0 | 0 | 2 | 1 | 5 | 0 | 1 | 0 | 3 | 3 | 7 | 3 |
| AC Sparta Prague | Czech Republic | 6 | 0 | 2 | 0 | 1 | 2 | 3 | 11 | 1 | 0 | 0 | 3 | 1 | 14 | 0 | 0 | 1 | 5 | 4 | 25 | 1 |
| ADO Den Haag | Netherlands | 2 | 1 | 0 | 1 | 0 | 0 | 3 | 0 | 3 | 0 | 0 | 1 | 0 | 1 | 0 | 1 | 0 | 1 | 3 | 1 | 3 |
| AEK Athens F.C. | Greece | 6 | 1 | 2 | 0 | 2 | 1 | 6 | 7 | 2 | 1 | 1 | 1 | 2 | 2 | 4 | 1 | 3 | 2 | 8 | 9 | 6 |
| AF Gloria Bistrița | Romania | 2 | 0 | 1 | 0 | 0 | 1 | 0 | 5 | 0 | 0 | 0 | 1 | 0 | 11 | 0 | 0 | 0 | 2 | 0 | 16 | 0 |
| AFC Ajax | Netherlands | 6 | 0 | 2 | 1 | 1 | 1 | 5 | 4 | 4 | 0 | 0 | 3 | 0 | 16 | 0 | 1 | 1 | 4 | 5 | 20 | 4 |
| AJ Auxerre | France | 1 | 0 | 0 | 0 | 0 | 1 | 1 | 10 | 0 | 0 | 0 | 0 | 0 | 0 | 0 | 0 | 0 | 1 | 1 | 10 | 0 |
| Ards F.C. | North Ireland | 1 | 0 | 0 | 1 | 0 | 0 | 4 | 1 | 3 | 0 | 0 | 0 | 0 | 0 | 0 | 1 | 0 | 0 | 4 | 1 | 3 |
| Arsenal F.C. | England | 2 | 0 | 1 | 0 | 0 | 1 | 1 | 3 | 0 | 0 | 0 | 1 | 0 | 3 | 0 | 0 | 0 | 2 | 1 | 6 | 0 |
| Asteras Tripolis | Greece | 2 | 0 | 0 | 1 | 0 | 0 | 2 | 1 | 3 | 0 | 0 | 1 | 0 | 2 | 0 | 1 | 0 | 1 | 2 | 3 | 3 |
| Atalanta B.C. | Italy | 2 | 0 | 0 | 0 | 1 | 0 | 1 | 1 | 1 | 0 | 0 | 1 | 1 | 3 | 0 | 0 | 1 | 1 | 2 | 4 | 1 |
| Athletic Bilbao | Spain | 4 | 1 | 1 | 2 | 0 | 0 | 4 | 0 | 6 | 0 | 0 | 2 | 2 | 6 | 0 | 2 | 0 | 2 | 6 | 6 | 6 |
| Atlético Madrid | Spain | 2 | 0 | 0 | 0 | 1 | 0 | 1 | 1 | 1 | 0 | 1 | 0 | 0 | 0 | 1 | 0 | 2 | 0 | 1 | 1 | 2 |
| B68 Toftir | Faroe Islands | 1 | 0 | 0 | 1 | 0 | 0 | 4 | 1 | 3 | 0 | 0 | 0 | 0 | 0 | 0 | 1 | 0 | 0 | 4 | 1 | 3 |
| B71 Sandoy | Faroe Islands | 2 | 1 | 0 | 1 | 0 | 0 | 4 | 2 | 3 | 1 | 0 | 0 | 5 | 1 | 3 | 2 | 0 | 0 | 9 | 3 | 6 |
| Bangor F.C. | North Ireland | 2 | 1 | 0 | 1 | 0 | 0 | 2 | 1 | 3 | 0 | 1 | 0 | 1 | 1 | 1 | 1 | 1 | 0 | 3 | 2 | 4 |
| Bayer 04 Leverkusen | Germany | 1 | 0 | 0 | 0 | 0 | 1 | 0 | 2 | 0 | 0 | 0 | 0 | 0 | 0 | 0 | 0 | 0 | 1 | 0 | 2 | 0 |
| Beitar Jerusalem F.C. | Israel | 2 | 0 | 1 | 1 | 0 | 0 | 3 | 2 | 3 | 0 | 0 | 1 | 0 | 1 | 0 | 1 | 0 | 1 | 3 | 3 | 3 |
| Berliner FC Dynamo | Germany | 2 | 0 | 1 | 1 | 0 | 0 | 2 | 1 | 3 | 0 | 0 | 1 | 0 | 3 | 0 | 1 | 0 | 1 | 2 | 4 | 3 |
| Besa Kavajë | Albania | 2 | 0 | 1 | 0 | 1 | 0 | 1 | 1 | 1 | 0 | 1 | 0 | 0 | 0 | 1 | 0 | 2 | 0 | 1 | 1 | 2 |
| Birkirkara F.C. | Malta | 2 | 1 | 0 | 1 | 0 | 0 | 4 | 0 | 3 | 1 | 0 | 0 | 2 | 0 | 3 | 2 | 0 | 0 | 6 | 0 | 6 |
| Boavista F.C. | Portugal | 2 | 0 | 1 | 0 | 0 | 1 | 0 | 1 | 0 | 0 | 0 | 1 | 1 | 2 | 0 | 0 | 0 | 2 | 1 | 3 | 0 |
| Bohemian F.C. | Republic of Ireland | 2 | 0 | 1 | 1 | 0 | 0 | 2 | 1 | 3 | 0 | 0 | 1 | 0 | 1 | 0 | 1 | 0 | 1 | 2 | 2 | 3 |
| Bohemians 1905 | Czech Republic | 2 | 0 | 1 | 0 | 1 | 0 | 2 | 2 | 1 | 0 | 0 | 1 | 1 | 6 | 0 | 0 | 1 | 1 | 3 | 8 | 1 |
| Boldklubben 1903 | Denmark | 2 | 0 | 1 | 0 | 0 | 1 | 0 | 1 | 0 | 0 | 0 | 1 | 0 | 6 | 0 | 0 | 0 | 2 | 0 | 7 | 0 |
| Borussia Dortmund | Germany | 2 | 0 | 0 | 0 | 1 | 0 | 1 | 1 | 1 | 0 | 1 | 0 | 1 | 1 | 1 | 0 | 2 | 0 | 2 | 2 | 2 |
| Borussia Mönchengladbach | Germany | 6 | 0 | 1 | 0 | 1 | 2 | 0 | 8 | 1 | 0 | 0 | 3 | 0 | 17 | 0 | 0 | 1 | 5 | 0 | 25 | 1 |
| Brøndby IF | Denmark | 2 | 0 | 1 | 0 | 1 | 0 | 2 | 2 | 1 | 0 | 1 | 0 | 0 | 0 | 1 | 0 | 2 | 0 | 2 | 2 | 2 |
| BSC Young Boys | Switzerland | 4 | 0 | 1 | 1 | 0 | 1 | 1 | 2 | 3 | 0 | 0 | 2 | 1 | 3 | 0 | 1 | 0 | 3 | 2 | 5 | 3 |
| Cardiff City F.C. | Wales | 2 | 0 | 1 | 0 | 1 | 0 | 0 | 0 | 1 | 0 | 0 | 1 | 0 | 8 | 0 | 0 | 1 | 1 | 0 | 8 | 1 |
| Cercle Brugge K.S.V. | Belgium | 2 | 1 | 0 | 1 | 0 | 0 | 3 | 1 | 3 | 0 | 0 | 1 | 0 | 1 | 0 | 1 | 0 | 1 | 3 | 2 | 3 |
| CFR Cluj | Romania | 2 | 1 | 0 | 0 | 1 | 0 | 0 | 0 | 1 | 1 | 0 | 0 | 3 | 1 | 3 | 1 | 1 | 0 | 3 | 1 | 4 |
| Chelsea F.C. | England | 2 | 0 | 0 | 0 | 0 | 1 | 0 | 1 | 0 | 0 | 1 | 0 | 2 | 2 | 1 | 0 | 1 | 1 | 2 | 3 | 1 |
| Cliftonville F.C. | North Ireland | 2 | 1 | 0 | 1 | 0 | 0 | 2 | 0 | 3 | 1 | 0 | 0 | 3 | 2 | 3 | 2 | 0 | 0 | 5 | 2 | 6 |
| Club Brugge KV | Belgium | 6 | 0 | 3 | 0 | 1 | 2 | 2 | 5 | 1 | 0 | 0 | 3 | 1 | 11 | 0 | 0 | 1 | 5 | 3 | 16 | 1 |
| Cork City F.C. | Republic of Ireland | 4 | 1 | 1 | 1 | 1 | 0 | 2 | 1 | 4 | 1 | 0 | 1 | 1 | 1 | 3 | 2 | 1 | 1 | 3 | 2 | 7 |
| Cork Hibernians F.C. | Republic of Ireland | 2 | 0 | 1 | 0 | 0 | 1 | 1 | 2 | 0 | 0 | 0 | 1 | 1 | 4 | 0 | 0 | 0 | 2 | 2 | 6 | 0 |
| CS Grevenmacher | Luxembourg | 2 | 1 | 0 | 1 | 0 | 0 | 3 | 0 | 3 | 0 | 0 | 1 | 0 | 2 | 0 | 1 | 0 | 1 | 3 | 2 | 3 |
| CS Tiligul-Tiras Tiraspol | Moldavia | 2 | 1 | 0 | 1 | 0 | 0 | 3 | 1 | 3 | 1 | 0 | 0 | 1 | 0 | 3 | 2 | 0 | 0 | 4 | 1 | 6 |
| CSKA Moscow | Russia | 2 | 0 | 1 | 0 | 0 | 1 | 1 | 2 | 0 | 0 | 0 | 1 | 0 | 4 | 0 | 0 | 0 | 2 | 1 | 6 | 0 |
| Deportivo de La Coruña | Spain | 2 | 0 | 1 | 0 | 1 | 0 | 0 | 0 | 1 | 0 | 0 | 1 | 0 | 8 | 0 | 0 | 1 | 1 | 0 | 8 | 1 |
| Derry City F.C. | North Ireland | 2 | 1 | 0 | 1 | 0 | 0 | 2 | 1 | 3 | 1 | 0 | 0 | 3 | 0 | 3 | 2 | 0 | 0 | 5 | 1 | 6 |
| Djurgårdens IF Fotboll | Sweden | 1 | 0 | 0 | 0 | 0 | 0 | 0 | 0 | 0 | 0 | 0 | 1 | 0 | 8 | 0 | 0 | 0 | 1 | 0 | 8 | 0 |
| Dukla Prague | Czech Republic | 2 | 0 | 1 | 0 | 1 | 0 | 2 | 2 | 1 | 0 | 0 | 1 | 0 | 4 | 0 | 0 | 1 | 1 | 2 | 6 | 1 |
| Dunakanyar-Vác FC | Hungary | 2 | 1 | 0 | 1 | 0 | 0 | 4 | 0 | 3 | 0 | 0 | 1 | 0 | 2 | 0 | 1 | 0 | 1 | 4 | 2 | 3 |
| Dunaújváros FC | Hungary | 2 | 1 | 0 | 0 | 1 | 0 | 2 | 2 | 1 | 1 | 0 | 0 | 4 | 2 | 3 | 1 | 1 | 0 | 6 | 4 | 4 |
| Dunfermline Athletic F.C. | Scotland | 2 | 0 | 1 | 0 | 0 | 1 | 0 | 2 | 0 | 0 | 0 | 1 | 1 | 10 | 0 | 0 | 0 | 2 | 1 | 12 | 0 |
| EB/Streymur | Faroe Islands | 2 | 1 | 0 | 1 | 0 | 0 | 3 | 0 | 3 | 1 | 0 | 0 | 2 | 0 | 3 | 2 | 0 | 0 | 5 | 0 | 6 |
| Eintracht Frankfurt | Germany | 2 | 0 | 0 | 0 | 0 | 1 | 0 | 3 | 0 | 0 | 0 | 1 | 0 | 2 | 0 | 0 | 0 | 2 | 0 | 5 | 0 |
| Everton F.C. | England | 2 | 0 | 0 | 0 | 0 | 1 | 0 | 3 | 0 | 0 | 1 | 0 | 2 | 2 | 1 | 0 | 1 | 1 | 2 | 5 | 1 |
| F.C. Copenhagen | Denmark | 4 | 1 | 1 | 1 | 1 | 0 | 4 | 2 | 4 | 0 | 0 | 2 | 0 | 2 | 0 | 1 | 1 | 2 | 4 | 4 | 4 |
| F91 Dudelange | Luxembourg | 2 | 1 | 0 | 1 | 0 | 0 | 1 | 0 | 3 | 1 | 0 | 0 | 1 | 0 | 3 | 2 | 0 | 0 | 2 | 0 | 6 |
| FA Red Boys Differdange | Luxembourg | 2 | 1 | 0 | 1 | 0 | 0 | 6 | 1 | 3 | 0 | 0 | 1 | 1 | 2 | 0 | 1 | 0 | 1 | 7 | 3 | 3 |
| FC Aarau | Switzerland | 2 | 0 | 1 | 1 | 0 | 0 | 2 | 1 | 3 | 0 | 0 | 1 | 0 | 2 | 0 | 1 | 0 | 1 | 2 | 3 | 3 |
| FC Admira Wacker Mödling | Austria | 2 | 0 | 1 | 1 | 0 | 0 | 1 | 0 | 3 | 0 | 0 | 1 | 0 | 3 | 0 | 1 | 0 | 1 | 1 | 3 | 3 |
| FC Ararat Yerevan | Armenia | 4 | 0 | 2 | 0 | 1 | 1 | 1 | 2 | 1 | 0 | 0 | 2 | 0 | 10 | 0 | 0 | 1 | 3 | 1 | 12 | 1 |
| FC Argeș Pitești | Romania | 2 | 0 | 1 | 0 | 1 | 0 | 1 | 1 | 1 | 0 | 0 | 1 | 0 | 4 | 0 | 0 | 1 | 1 | 1 | 5 | 1 |
| FC Astana | Kazakhstan | 4 | 0 | 1 | 1 | 1 | 0 | 3 | 2 | 4 | 0 | 0 | 2 | 1 | 4 | 0 | 1 | 1 | 2 | 4 | 6 | 4 |
| FC Astra Giurgiu | Romania | 2 | 0 | 1 | 0 | 0 | 1 | 1 | 2 | 0 | 0 | 1 | 0 | 1 | 1 | 1 | 0 | 1 | 1 | 2 | 3 | 1 |
| FC Banants | Armenia | 4 | 2 | 0 | 2 | 0 | 0 | 7 | 1 | 6 | 2 | 0 | 0 | 2 | 0 | 6 | 4 | 0 | 0 | 9 | 1 | 12 |
| FC Barcelona | Spain | 6 | 0 | 2 | 0 | 2 | 1 | 1 | 5 | 2 | 0 | 0 | 3 | 0 | 11 | 0 | 0 | 2 | 4 | 1 | 16 | 2 |
| FC BATE Borisov | Belarus | 2 | 0 | 1 | 1 | 0 | 0 | 2 | 0 | 3 | 0 | 0 | 1 | 0 | 3 | 0 | 1 | 0 | 1 | 2 | 3 | 3 |
| FC Bayern Munich | Germany | 6 | 0 | 3 | 0 | 0 | 3 | 2 | 8 | 0 | 0 | 0 | 3 | 0 | 23 | 0 | 0 | 0 | 6 | 2 | 31 | 0 |
| FC Belshina Bobruisk | Belarus | 2 | 1 | 0 | 1 | 0 | 0 | 3 | 0 | 3 | 1 | 0 | 0 | 5 | 1 | 3 | 2 | 0 | 0 | 8 | 1 | 6 |
| FC DAC 1904 Dunajská Streda | Slovakia | 2 | 0 | 1 | 0 | 0 | 1 | 0 | 1 | 0 | 0 | 0 | 1 | 1 | 5 | 0 | 0 | 0 | 2 | 1 | 6 | 0 |
| FC Dila Gori | Georgia | 2 | 0 | 1 | 0 | 0 | 1 | 0 | 3 | 0 | 1 | 0 | 0 | 1 | 0 | 3 | 1 | 0 | 1 | 1 | 3 | 3 |
| FC Dinamo Batumi | Georgia | 2 | 1 | 0 | 1 | 0 | 0 | 2 | 0 | 3 | 0 | 0 | 1 | 0 | 1 | 0 | 1 | 0 | 1 | 2 | 1 | 3 |
| FC Dinamo București | Romania | 6 | 0 | 3 | 2 | 0 | 1 | 4 | 11 | 6 | 0 | 0 | 3 | 2 | 10 | 0 | 2 | 0 | 4 | 6 | 21 | 6 |
| FC Dinamo Minsk | Belarus | 4 | 2 | 0 | 2 | 0 | 0 | 3 | 0 | 6 | 0 | 2 | 0 | 2 | 2 | 2 | 2 | 2 | 0 | 5 | 2 | 8 |
| FC Dynamo Moscow | Russia | 2 | 0 | 1 | 0 | 0 | 1 | 1 | 2 | 0 | 0 | 1 | 0 | 2 | 2 | 1 | 0 | 1 | 1 | 3 | 4 | 1 |
| FC Flora | Esthonia | 2 | 1 | 0 | 1 | 0 | 0 | 1 | 0 | 3 | 0 | 1 | 0 | 0 | 0 | 1 | 1 | 1 | 0 | 1 | 0 | 4 |
| FC Gagra | Georgia | 2 | 1 | 0 | 1 | 0 | 0 | 3 | 0 | 3 | 0 | 0 | 1 | 0 | 2 | 0 | 1 | 0 | 1 | 3 | 2 | 3 |
| FC Girondins de Bordeaux | France | 4 | 0 | 1 | 1 | 0 | 1 | 2 | 2 | 3 | 0 | 0 | 2 | 1 | 5 | 0 | 1 | 0 | 3 | 3 | 7 | 3 |
| FC Irtysh Pavlodar | Kazakhstan | 2 | 1 | 0 | 0 | 1 | 0 | 0 | 0 | 1 | 1 | 0 | 0 | 2 | 1 | 3 | 1 | 1 | 0 | 2 | 1 | 4 |
| FC Kotayk | Armenia | 2 | 1 | 0 | 1 | 0 | 0 | 5 | 0 | 3 | 0 | 0 | 1 | 0 | 1 | 0 | 1 | 0 | 1 | 5 | 1 | 3 |
| FC Lausanne-Sport | Switzerland | 1 | 0 | 0 | 0 | 0 | 0 | 0 | 0 | 0 | 0 | 0 | 1 | 1 | 4 | 0 | 0 | 0 | 1 | 1 | 4 | 0 |
| FC Lokomotiv 1929 Sofia | Bulgaria | 2 | 0 | 1 | 0 | 1 | 0 | 2 | 2 | 1 | 0 | 0 | 1 | 2 | 4 | 0 | 0 | 1 | 1 | 4 | 6 | 1 |
| FC Lokomotiv Moscow | Russia | 2 | 1 | 0 | 0 | 1 | 0 | 1 | 1 | 1 | 1 | 0 | 0 | 4 | 1 | 3 | 1 | 1 | 0 | 5 | 2 | 4 |
| FC Metalist Kharkiv | Ukraine | 2 | 0 | 1 | 0 | 0 | 1 | 0 | 1 | 0 | 0 | 1 | 0 | 2 | 2 | 1 | 0 | 1 | 1 | 2 | 3 | 1 |
| FC Midtjylland | Denmark | 4 | 2 | 0 | 1 | 0 | 1 | 3 | 3 | 3 | 1 | 1 | 0 | 3 | 2 | 4 | 2 | 1 | 1 | 6 | 5 | 7 |
| FC Porto | Portugal | 4 | 0 | 0 | 1 | 0 | 1 | 2 | 2 | 3 | 0 | 1 | 1 | 2 | 3 | 1 | 1 | 1 | 2 | 4 | 5 | 4 |
| FC Progrès Niederkorn | Luxembourg | 2 | 1 | 0 | 1 | 0 | 0 | 2 | 1 | 3 | 1 | 0 | 0 | 1 | 0 | 3 | 2 | 0 | 0 | 3 | 1 | 6 |
| FC Pyunik | Armenia | 2 | 1 | 0 | 1 | 0 | 0 | 1 | 0 | 3 | 1 | 0 | 0 | 2 | 0 | 3 | 2 | 0 | 0 | 3 | 0 | 6 |
| FC Red Bull Salzburg | Austria | 4 | 0 | 2 | 1 | 1 | 0 | 3 | 2 | 4 | 0 | 0 | 2 | 1 | 5 | 0 | 1 | 1 | 2 | 4 | 7 | 4 |
| FC Saxan | Moldavia | 2 | 1 | 0 | 1 | 0 | 0 | 2 | 0 | 3 | 1 | 0 | 0 | 2 | 0 | 3 | 2 | 0 | 0 | 4 | 0 | 6 |
| FC Schalke 04 | Germany | 6 | 0 | 1 | 0 | 0 | 3 | 1 | 12 | 0 | 0 | 2 | 1 | 1 | 2 | 2 | 0 | 2 | 4 | 2 | 14 | 2 |
| FC Shakhtar Donetsk | Ukraine | 2 | 0 | 0 | 0 | 0 | 1 | 0 | 2 | 0 | 0 | 1 | 0 | 1 | 1 | 1 | 0 | 1 | 1 | 1 | 3 | 1 |
| FC Sibir Novosibirsk | Russia | 2 | 0 | 1 | 1 | 0 | 0 | 2 | 1 | 3 | 0 | 0 | 1 | 0 | 1 | 0 | 1 | 0 | 1 | 2 | 2 | 3 |
| FC Sion | Switzerland | 2 | 0 | 1 | 0 | 0 | 1 | 1 | 3 | 0 | 1 | 0 | 0 | 3 | 2 | 3 | 1 | 0 | 1 | 4 | 5 | 3 |
| FC Slovan Liberec | Czech Republic | 2 | 0 | 1 | 0 | 0 | 1 | 0 | 1 | 0 | 0 | 0 | 1 | 0 | 3 | 0 | 0 | 0 | 2 | 0 | 4 | 0 |
| FC Spartak Moscow | Russia | 2 | 1 | 0 | 0 | 1 | 0 | 1 | 1 | 1 | 1 | 0 | 0 | 1 | 0 | 3 | 1 | 1 | 0 | 2 | 1 | 4 |
| FC Sportul Studențesc București | Romania | 2 | 0 | 1 | 0 | 1 | 0 | 1 | 1 | 1 | 0 | 0 | 1 | 0 | 1 | 0 | 0 | 1 | 1 | 1 | 2 | 1 |
| Steaua București | Romania | 6 | 0 | 2 | 0 | 1 | 2 | 2 | 5 | 1 | 0 | 1 | 2 | 4 | 8 | 1 | 0 | 2 | 4 | 6 | 13 | 2 |
| FC Swarovski Tirol | Austria | 2 | 0 | 1 | 0 | 0 | 1 | 2 | 3 | 0 | 0 | 0 | 1 | 0 | 6 | 0 | 0 | 0 | 2 | 2 | 9 | 0 |
| CS Universitatea Craiova | Ρουμανία | 2 | 0 | 1 | 0 | 0 | 1 | 1 | 6 | 0 | 0 | 0 | 1 | 0 | 2 | 0 | 0 | 0 | 2 | 1 | 8 | 0 |
| CS Universitatea Craiova (1991) | Romania | 2 | 1 | 0 | 1 | 0 | 0 | 3 | 0 | 3 | 0 | 0 | 1 | 0 | 2 | 0 | 1 | 0 | 1 | 3 | 2 | 3 |
| FC Vaslui | Romania | 2 | 0 | 1 | 0 | 1 | 0 | 1 | 1 | 1 | 0 | 0 | 1 | 0 | 2 | 0 | 0 | 1 | 1 | 1 | 3 | 1 |
| FC Viitorul Constanța | Romania | 2 | 1 | 0 | 1 | 0 | 0 | 4 | 0 | 3 | 0 | 0 | 1 | 0 | 1 | 0 | 1 | 0 | 1 | 4 | 1 | 3 |
| FC Viktoria Plzeň | Czech Republic | 2 | 0 | 1 | 0 | 1 | 0 | 0 | 0 | 1 | 0 | 0 | 1 | 1 | 3 | 0 | 0 | 1 | 1 | 1 | 3 | 1 |
| FC Zaria Bălți | Moldavia | 2 | 1 | 0 | 1 | 0 | 0 | 3 | 0 | 3 | 1 | 0 | 0 | 2 | 1 | 3 | 2 | 0 | 0 | 5 | 1 | 6 |
| FC Zenit Saint Petersburg | Russia | 4 | 0 | 1 | 2 | 0 | 0 | 3 | 1 | 6 | 0 | 1 | 1 | 0 | 3 | 1 | 2 | 1 | 1 | 3 | 4 | 7 |
| FC Zorya Luhansk | Ukraine | 2 | 0 | 1 | 0 | 0 | 1 | 0 | 1 | 0 | 0 | 0 | 1 | 0 | 2 | 0 | 0 | 0 | 2 | 0 | 3 | 0 |
| FC Zürich | Switzerland | 6 | 0 | 2 | 1 | 1 | 1 | 7 | 7 | 4 | 0 | 0 | 3 | 1 | 8 | 0 | 1 | 1 | 4 | 8 | 15 | 4 |
| FCI Levadia Tallinn | Esthonia | 2 | 1 | 0 | 1 | 0 | 0 | 3 | 0 | 3 | 1 | 0 | 0 | 3 | 1 | 3 | 2 | 0 | 0 | 6 | 1 | 6 |
| Fenerbahçe S.K. (football) | Turkey | 2 | 0 | 0 | 0 | 0 | 1 | 0 | 1 | 0 | 0 | 0 | 1 | 0 | 2 | 0 | 0 | 0 | 2 | 0 | 3 | 0 |
| Ferencvárosi TC | Hungary | 2 | 0 | 1 | 1 | 0 | 0 | 2 | 1 | 3 | 0 | 0 | 1 | 0 | 4 | 0 | 1 | 0 | 1 | 2 | 5 | 3 |
| Feyenoord | Netherlands | 2 | 0 | 1 | 0 | 0 | 1 | 0 | 9 | 0 | 0 | 0 | 1 | 0 | 8 | 0 | 0 | 0 | 2 | 0 | 17 | 0 |
| FK Austria Wien | Austria | 4 | 0 | 2 | 1 | 0 | 1 | 2 | 2 | 3 | 0 | 1 | 1 | 0 | 3 | 1 | 1 | 1 | 2 | 2 | 5 | 4 |
| FK Budućnost Podgorica | Montenegro | 3 | 1 | 0 | 0 | 1 | 0 | 0 | 0 | 1 | 1 | 1 | 0 | 3 | 1 | 4 | 1 | 2 | 0 | 3 | 1 | 5 |
| FK Dubnica | Slovakia | 2 | 0 | 1 | 0 | 0 | 1 | 1 | 4 | 0 | 0 | 0 | 1 | 0 | 3 | 0 | 0 | 0 | 2 | 1 | 7 | 0 |
| FK Ekranas | Lithuania | 2 | 1 | 0 | 0 | 1 | 0 | 3 | 3 | 1 | 1 | 0 | 0 | 2 | 1 | 3 | 1 | 1 | 0 | 5 | 4 | 4 |
| FK Jablonec | Czech Republic | 4 | 2 | 0 | 2 | 0 | 0 | 3 | 1 | 6 | 1 | 0 | 1 | 4 | 3 | 3 | 3 | 0 | 1 | 7 | 4 | 9 |
| FK Kareda Kaunas | Lithuania | 2 | 1 | 0 | 1 | 0 | 0 | 3 | 0 | 3 | 0 | 1 | 0 | 1 | 1 | 1 | 1 | 1 | 0 | 4 | 1 | 4 |
| FK Makedonija Gjorče Petrov | Macedonia | 2 | 0 | 1 | 1 | 0 | 0 | 1 | 0 | 3 | 0 | 0 | 1 | 0 | 2 | 0 | 1 | 0 | 1 | 1 | 2 | 3 |
| FK Metalurg Skopje | Macedonia | 2 | 1 | 0 | 1 | 0 | 0 | 3 | 0 | 3 | 1 | 0 | 0 | 1 | 0 | 3 | 2 | 0 | 0 | 4 | 0 | 6 |
| FK Milano Kumanovo | Macedonia | 2 | 1 | 0 | 1 | 0 | 0 | 2 | 0 | 3 | 1 | 0 | 0 | 2 | 1 | 3 | 2 | 0 | 0 | 4 | 1 | 6 |
| FK Mladá Boleslav | Czech Republic | 2 | 1 | 0 | 1 | 0 | 0 | 3 | 0 | 3 | 0 | 1 | 0 | 2 | 2 | 1 | 1 | 1 | 0 | 5 | 2 | 4 |
| FK Partizani Tirana | Albania | 2 | 1 | 0 | 1 | 0 | 0 | 4 | 2 | 3 | 0 | 0 | 1 | 1 | 2 | 0 | 1 | 0 | 1 | 5 | 4 | 3 |
| FK Pelister | Macedonia | 2 | 1 | 0 | 1 | 0 | 0 | 1 | 0 | 3 | 0 | 1 | 0 | 0 | 0 | 1 | 1 | 1 | 0 | 1 | 0 | 4 |
| FK Rabotnichki | Macedonia | 2 | 0 | 1 | 0 | 0 | 1 | 0 | 2 | 0 | 1 | 0 | 0 | 2 | 1 | 3 | 1 | 0 | 1 | 2 | 3 | 3 |
| FK Renova | Macedonia | 2 | 1 | 0 | 1 | 0 | 0 | 3 | 0 | 3 | 1 | 0 | 0 | 2 | 0 | 3 | 2 | 0 | 0 | 5 | 0 | 6 |
| FK Rudar Pljevlja | Montenegro | 2 | 1 | 0 | 1 | 0 | 0 | 2 | 0 | 3 | 1 | 0 | 0 | 2 | 0 | 3 | 2 | 0 | 0 | 4 | 0 | 6 |
| FK Sarajevo | Bosnia and Herzegovina | 2 | 0 | 1 | 0 | 1 | 0 | 2 | 2 | 1 | 0 | 0 | 1 | 1 | 3 | 0 | 0 | 1 | 1 | 3 | 5 | 1 |
| FK Senica | Slovakia | 2 | 1 | 0 | 1 | 0 | 0 | 2 | 0 | 3 | 1 | 0 | 0 | 1 | 0 | 3 | 2 | 0 | 0 | 3 | 0 | 6 |
| FK Sloga Jugomagnat | Macedonia | 2 | 1 | 0 | 1 | 0 | 0 | 4 | 0 | 3 | 1 | 0 | 0 | 4 | 1 | 3 | 2 | 0 | 0 | 8 | 1 | 6 |
| FK Tauras Tauragė | Lithuania | 2 | 1 | 0 | 1 | 0 | 0 | 3 | 1 | 3 | 1 | 0 | 0 | 3 | 0 | 3 | 2 | 0 | 0 | 6 | 1 | 6 |
| FK Tomori Berat | Albania | 2 | 1 | 0 | 1 | 0 | 0 | 2 | 0 | 3 | 1 | 0 | 0 | 3 | 2 | 3 | 2 | 0 | 0 | 5 | 2 | 6 |
| FK Trakai | Lithuania | 2 | 1 | 0 | 1 | 0 | 0 | 4 | 0 | 3 | 0 | 1 | 0 | 0 | 0 | 1 | 1 | 1 | 0 | 4 | 0 | 4 |
| FK Vardar | Macedonia | 6 | 2 | 1 | 1 | 1 | 1 | 2 | 5 | 4 | 1 | 1 | 1 | 3 | 6 | 4 | 2 | 2 | 2 | 5 | 11 | 8 |
| FK Velež Mostar | Bosnia and Herzegovina | 2 | 0 | 1 | 0 | 0 | 1 | 2 | 5 | 0 | 0 | 0 | 1 | 0 | 1 | 0 | 0 | 0 | 2 | 2 | 6 | 0 |
| FK Željezničar Sarajevo | Bosnia and Herzegovina | 2 | 0 | 1 | 0 | 0 | 1 | 1 | 3 | 0 | 0 | 0 | 1 | 0 | 1 | 0 | 0 | 0 | 2 | 1 | 4 | 0 |
| Floriana F.C. | Malta | 2 | 1 | 0 | 1 | 0 | 0 | 1 | 0 | 3 | 1 | 0 | 0 | 8 | 0 | 3 | 2 | 0 | 0 | 9 | 0 | 6 |
| Gabala FK | Azerbaijan | 2 | 0 | 1 | 0 | 1 | 0 | 1 | 1 | 1 | 0 | 0 | 1 | 0 | 1 | 0 | 0 | 1 | 1 | 1 | 2 | 1 |
| Gefle IF | Sweden | 2 | 0 | 1 | 1 | 0 | 0 | 3 | 0 | 3 | 0 | 0 | 1 | 0 | 4 | 0 | 1 | 0 | 1 | 3 | 4 | 3 |
| Getafe CF | Spain | 2 | 0 | 1 | 0 | 1 | 0 | 1 | 1 | 1 | 0 | 0 | 1 | 0 | 1 | 0 | 0 | 1 | 1 | 1 | 2 | 1 |
| Grasshopper Club Zürich | Switzerland | 2 | 0 | 1 | 0 | 0 | 1 | 1 | 2 | 0 | 0 | 1 | 0 | 3 | 3 | 1 | 0 | 1 | 1 | 4 | 5 | 1 |
| Grazer AK | Austria | 2 | 1 | 0 | 1 | 0 | 0 | 2 | 0 | 3 | 0 | 1 | 0 | 1 | 1 | 1 | 1 | 1 | 0 | 3 | 1 | 4 |
| Győri ETO FC | Hungary | 4 | 0 | 2 | 0 | 1 | 1 | 2 | 6 | 1 | 0 | 1 | 1 | 1 | 6 | 1 | 0 | 2 | 2 | 3 | 12 | 2 |
| Havnar Bóltfelag | Faroe Islands | 4 | 2 | 0 | 2 | 0 | 0 | 10 | 0 | 6 | 1 | 1 | 0 | 5 | 2 | 4 | 3 | 1 | 0 | 15 | 2 | 10 |
| Helsingin Jalkapalloklubi | Finland | 6 | 2 | 1 | 3 | 0 | 0 | 5 | 0 | 9 | 0 | 1 | 2 | 4 | 8 | 1 | 3 | 1 | 2 | 9 | 8 | 10 |
| Hertha BSC | Germany | 6 | 0 | 3 | 0 | 1 | 2 | 0 | 2 | 1 | 0 | 0 | 3 | 1 | 9 | 0 | 0 | 1 | 5 | 1 | 11 | 1 |
| Hibernians F.C. | Malta | 2 | 1 | 0 | 1 | 0 | 0 | 3 | 0 | 3 | 1 | 0 | 0 | 3 | 0 | 3 | 2 | 0 | 0 | 6 | 0 | 6 |
| HNK Rijeka | Croatia | 2 | 1 | 0 | 1 | 0 | 0 | 2 | 1 | 3 | 0 | 1 | 0 | 2 | 2 | 1 | 1 | 1 | 0 | 4 | 3 | 4 |
| HNK Šibenik | Croatia | 2 | 1 | 0 | 0 | 0 | 1 | 0 | 2 | 0 | 1 | 0 | 0 | 3 | 0 | 3 | 1 | 0 | 1 | 3 | 2 | 3 |
| IFK Göteborg | Sweden | 2 | 0 | 1 | 0 | 0 | 1 | 1 | 2 | 0 | 0 | 0 | 1 | 1 | 5 | 0 | 0 | 0 | 2 | 2 | 7 | 0 |
| Inter Milan | Italy | 4 | 0 | 1 | 0 | 2 | 0 | 6 | 6 | 2 | 0 | 0 | 2 | 0 | 2 | 0 | 0 | 2 | 2 | 6 | 8 | 2 |
| Iraklis | Greece | 6 | 3 | 0 | 3 | 0 | 0 | 7 | 2 | 9 | 1 | 1 | 1 | 3 | 4 | 4 | 4 | 1 | 1 | 10 | 6 | 13 |
| Íþróttabandalag Akraness | Iceland | 2 | 0 | 1 | 1 | 0 | 0 | 2 | 1 | 3 | 0 | 0 | 1 | 0 | 4 | 0 | 1 | 0 | 1 | 2 | 5 | 3 |
| Jagiellonia Białystok | Poland | 2 | 1 | 0 | 1 | 0 | 0 | 1 | 0 | 3 | 0 | 1 | 0 | 0 | 0 | 1 | 1 | 1 | 0 | 1 | 0 | 4 |
| JK Tervis Pärnu | Esthonia | 1 | 0 | 0 | 1 | 0 | 0 | 2 | 0 | 3 | 0 | 0 | 0 | 0 | 0 | 0 | 1 | 0 | 0 | 2 | 0 | 3 |
| JSD Partizan | Serbia | 6 | 2 | 1 | 2 | 0 | 1 | 4 | 3 | 6 | 1 | 0 | 2 | 1 | 4 | 3 | 3 | 0 | 3 | 5 | 7 | 9 |
| Juventus FC | Italy | 6 | 0 | 3 | 0 | 0 | 3 | 2 | 12 | 0 | 0 | 0 | 3 | 1 | 13 | 0 | 0 | 0 | 6 | 3 | 25 | 0 |
| K. Beerschot V.A.C. | Belgium | 2 | 0 | 1 | 0 | 0 | 1 | 0 | 1 | 0 | 0 | 0 | 1 | 0 | 7 | 0 | 0 | 0 | 2 | 0 | 8 | 0 |
| K. Waterschei S.V. Thor Genk | Belgium | 2 | 0 | 1 | 0 | 0 | 1 | 1 | 3 | 0 | 0 | 0 | 1 | 0 | 4 | 0 | 0 | 0 | 2 | 1 | 7 | 0 |
| K.S.K. Beveren | Belgium | 2 | 0 | 1 | 0 | 0 | 1 | 2 | 4 | 0 | 0 | 0 | 1 | 1 | 3 | 0 | 0 | 0 | 2 | 3 | 7 | 0 |
| K.S.V. Roeselare | Belgium | 2 | 1 | 0 | 1 | 0 | 0 | 5 | 0 | 3 | 0 | 0 | 1 | 1 | 2 | 0 | 1 | 0 | 1 | 6 | 2 | 3 |
| Karlsruher SC | Germany | 2 | 0 | 1 | 0 | 1 | 0 | 1 | 1 | 1 | 0 | 0 | 1 | 1 | 2 | 0 | 0 | 1 | 1 | 2 | 3 | 1 |
| KF Skënderbeu Korçë | Albania | 2 | 1 | 0 | 1 | 0 | 0 | 4 | 0 | 3 | 1 | 0 | 0 | 2 | 0 | 3 | 2 | 0 | 0 | 6 | 0 | 6 |
| KF Teuta Durrës | Albania | 2 | 1 | 0 | 1 | 0 | 0 | 4 | 2 | 3 | 1 | 0 | 0 | 4 | 1 | 3 | 2 | 0 | 0 | 8 | 3 | 6 |
| KF Tirana | Albania | 2 | 1 | 0 | 1 | 0 | 0 | 3 | 1 | 3 | 0 | 0 | 1 | 2 | 3 | 0 | 1 | 0 | 1 | 5 | 4 | 3 |
| KF Vllaznia Shkodër | Albania | 2 | 1 | 0 | 1 | 0 | 0 | 4 | 1 | 3 | 1 | 0 | 0 | 2 | 1 | 3 | 2 | 0 | 0 | 6 | 2 | 6 |
| LASK Linz | Austria | 1 | 0 | 0 | 0 | 0 | 0 | 0 | 0 | 0 | 0 | 0 | 1 | 0 | 2 | 0 | 0 | 0 | 1 | 0 | 2 | 0 |
| Legia Warsaw | Poland | 4 | 0 | 1 | 1 | 0 | 1 | 1 | 2 | 3 | 1 | 0 | 1 | 1 | 2 | 3 | 2 | 0 | 2 | 2 | 4 | 6 |
| Levski Sofia (sports club) | Bulgaria | 2 | 0 | 1 | 0 | 1 | 0 | 0 | 0 | 1 | 0 | 0 | 1 | 0 | 2 | 0 | 0 | 1 | 1 | 0 | 2 | 1 |
| Lierse S.K. | Belgium | 4 | 0 | 2 | 1 | 0 | 1 | 2 | 1 | 3 | 0 | 0 | 2 | 1 | 13 | 0 | 1 | 0 | 3 | 3 | 14 | 3 |
| Lincoln Red Imps F.C. | Gibraltar | 2 | 1 | 0 | 1 | 0 | 0 | 5 | 0 | 3 | 0 | 1 | 0 | 1 | 1 | 1 | 1 | 1 | 0 | 6 | 1 | 4 |
| Linfield F.C. | North Ireland | 4 | 2 | 0 | 2 | 0 | 0 | 8 | 1 | 6 | 0 | 1 | 1 | 3 | 5 | 1 | 2 | 1 | 1 | 11 | 6 | 7 |
| Liverpool F.C. | England | 2 | 0 | 1 | 0 | 0 | 1 | 1 | 2 | 0 | 0 | 0 | 1 | 1 | 6 | 0 | 0 | 0 | 2 | 2 | 8 | 0 |
| Maccabi Haifa F.C. | Israel | 2 | 0 | 0 | 1 | 0 | 0 | 2 | 1 | 3 | 0 | 0 | 1 | 0 | 1 | 0 | 1 | 0 | 1 | 2 | 2 | 3 |
| Maccabi Petah Tikva F.C. | Israel | 4 | 1 | 1 | 1 | 0 | 1 | 5 | 3 | 3 | 1 | 0 | 1 | 2 | 4 | 3 | 2 | 0 | 2 | 7 | 7 | 6 |
| Maccabi Tel Aviv | Israel | 4 | 1 | 0 | 1 | 1 | 0 | 1 | 0 | 4 | 0 | 2 | 0 | 2 | 2 | 2 | 1 | 3 | 0 | 3 | 2 | 6 |
| Malmö FF | Sweden | 4 | 0 | 2 | 1 | 1 | 0 | 2 | 1 | 4 | 0 | 0 | 2 | 0 | 17 | 0 | 1 | 1 | 2 | 2 | 18 | 4 |
| Manchester City F.C. | England | 2 | 0 | 1 | 0 | 0 | 1 | 1 | 2 | 0 | 0 | 0 | 1 | 1 | 2 | 0 | 0 | 0 | 2 | 2 | 4 | 0 |
| MSV Duisburg | Germany | 2 | 0 | 1 | 0 | 0 | 1 | 2 | 3 | 0 | 0 | 0 | 1 | 1 | 7 | 0 | 0 | 0 | 2 | 3 | 10 | 0 |
| MYPA | Finland | 2 | 1 | 0 | 1 | 0 | 0 | 3 | 0 | 3 | 0 | 1 | 0 | 1 | 1 | 1 | 1 | 1 | 0 | 4 | 1 | 4 |
| Neftçi PFK | Azerbaijan | 4 | 1 | 1 | 1 | 0 | 1 | 4 | 3 | 3 | 0 | 2 | 0 | 1 | 1 | 2 | 1 | 2 | 1 | 5 | 4 | 5 |
| Neuchâtel Xamax | Switzerland | 2 | 0 | 1 | 0 | 0 | 1 | 1 | 2 | 0 | 0 | 0 | 1 | 0 | 4 | 0 | 0 | 0 | 2 | 1 | 6 | 0 |
| NK Maribor | Slovenia | 4 | 1 | 1 | 1 | 1 | 0 | 5 | 3 | 4 | 0 | 1 | 1 | 1 | 2 | 1 | 1 | 2 | 1 | 6 | 5 | 5 |
| NK Osijek | Croatia | 2 | 1 | 0 | 0 | 1 | 0 | 0 | 0 | 1 | 0 | 1 | 0 | 2 | 2 | 1 | 0 | 2 | 0 | 2 | 2 | 2 |
| NK Slaven Belupo | Croatia | 2 | 0 | 1 | 0 | 0 | 1 | 0 | 2 | 0 | 0 | 0 | 1 | 0 | 7 | 0 | 0 | 0 | 2 | 0 | 9 | 0 |
| OFI Crete F.C. | Greece | 1 | 0 | 0 | 0 | 0 | 0 | 0 | 0 | 0 | 0 | 0 | 1 | 1 | 2 | 0 | 0 | 0 | 1 | 1 | 2 | 0 |
| OFK Petrovac | Montenegro | 2 | 0 | 1 | 1 | 0 | 0 | 2 | 1 | 3 | 0 | 0 | 1 | 1 | 3 | 0 | 1 | 0 | 1 | 3 | 4 | 3 |
| OGC Nice | France | 2 | 1 | 0 | 1 | 0 | 0 | 2 | 0 | 3 | 0 | 0 | 1 | 0 | 1 | 0 | 1 | 0 | 1 | 2 | 1 | 3 |
| Olympiacos F.C. | Greece | 8 | 1 | 2 | 2 | 0 | 2 | 7 | 5 | 6 | 1 | 1 | 2 | 3 | 4 | 4 | 3 | 1 | 4 | 10 | 9 | 10 |
| Olympique de Marseille | France | 2 | 0 | 0 | 1 | 0 | 0 | 3 | 0 | 3 | 0 | 0 | 1 | 1 | 5 | 0 | 1 | 0 | 1 | 4 | 5 | 3 |
| Olympique Lyonnais | France | 4 | 1 | 0 | 1 | 1 | 0 | 2 | 1 | 4 | 0 | 0 | 2 | 0 | 5 | 0 | 1 | 1 | 2 | 2 | 6 | 4 |
| Örgryte IS | Sweden | 2 | 0 | 1 | 1 | 0 | 0 | 2 | 1 | 3 | 0 | 0 | 1 | 0 | 4 | 0 | 1 | 0 | 1 | 2 | 5 | 3 |
| Panathinaikos F.C. | Greece | 4 | 0 | 1 | 1 | 0 | 1 | 3 | 2 | 3 | 0 | 0 | 2 | 0 | 3 | 0 | 1 | 0 | 3 | 3 | 5 | 3 |
| Panionios F.C. | Greece | 2 | 0 | 1 | 0 | 0 | 1 | 0 | 1 | 0 | 0 | 0 | 1 | 2 | 3 | 0 | 0 | 0 | 2 | 2 | 4 | 0 |
| PAOK FC | Greece | 2 | 0 | 1 | 0 | 0 | 1 | 0 | 2 | 0 | 0 | 1 | 0 | 1 | 1 | 1 | 0 | 1 | 1 | 1 | 3 | 1 |
| Paris Saint-Germain F.C. | France | 4 | 0 | 1 | 0 | 0 | 2 | 0 | 2 | 0 | 0 | 0 | 2 | 0 | 3 | 0 | 0 | 0 | 4 | 0 | 5 | 0 |
| PFC Litex Lovech | Bulgaria | 2 | 0 | 1 | 0 | 1 | 0 | 0 | 0 | 1 | 0 | 0 | 1 | 1 | 2 | 0 | 0 | 1 | 1 | 1 | 2 | 1 |
| PFC Neftochimic Burgas | Bulgaria | 2 | 0 | 1 | 0 | 1 | 0 | 0 | 0 | 1 | 0 | 0 | 1 | 1 | 2 | 0 | 0 | 1 | 1 | 1 | 2 | 1 |
| PFC Shumen 2010 | Bulgaria | 2 | 1 | 0 | 1 | 0 | 0 | 2 | 0 | 3 | 1 | 0 | 0 | 2 | 1 | 3 | 2 | 0 | 0 | 4 | 1 | 6 |
| PFC Slavia Sofia | Bulgaria | 2 | 1 | 0 | 1 | 0 | 0 | 4 | 2 | 3 | 0 | 0 | 1 | 1 | 2 | 0 | 1 | 0 | 1 | 5 | 4 | 3 |
| R.E. Mouscron | Belgium | 2 | 0 | 1 | 0 | 1 | 0 | 0 | 0 | 1 | 0 | 0 | 1 | 0 | 3 | 0 | 0 | 1 | 1 | 0 | 3 | 1 |
| R.S.C. Anderlecht | Belgium | 10 | 0 | 5 | 1 | 2 | 2 | 4 | 6 | 5 | 0 | 0 | 5 | 2 | 11 | 0 | 1 | 2 | 7 | 6 | 17 | 5 |
| Rabat Ajax F.C. | Malta | 2 | 1 | 0 | 1 | 0 | 0 | 5 | 0 | 3 | 1 | 0 | 0 | 5 | 0 | 3 | 2 | 0 | 0 | 10 | 0 | 6 |
| Rangers F.C. | Scotland | 4 | 0 | 2 | 0 | 1 | 1 | 1 | 2 | 1 | 0 | 0 | 2 | 0 | 3 | 0 | 0 | 1 | 3 | 1 | 5 | 1 |
| RC Lens | France | 2 | 0 | 1 | 0 | 1 | 0 | 0 | 0 | 1 | 0 | 0 | 1 | 1 | 3 | 0 | 0 | 1 | 1 | 1 | 3 | 1 |
| RCD Espanyol | Spain | 2 | 0 | 1 | 0 | 1 | 0 | 2 | 2 | 1 | 0 | 0 | 1 | 0 | 1 | 0 | 0 | 1 | 1 | 2 | 3 | 1 |
| RCD Mallorca | Spain | 2 | 0 | 1 | 0 | 0 | 1 | 1 | 2 | 0 | 0 | 0 | 1 | 2 | 4 | 0 | 0 | 0 | 2 | 3 | 6 | 0 |
| Real Madrid CF | Spain | 8 | 0 | 3 | 0 | 0 | 4 | 0 | 23 | 0 | 0 | 0 | 4 | 3 | 20 | 0 | 0 | 0 | 8 | 3 | 43 | 0 |
| Real Zaragoza | Spain | 2 | 0 | 1 | 0 | 0 | 1 | 0 | 3 | 0 | 0 | 1 | 0 | 1 | 1 | 1 | 0 | 1 | 1 | 1 | 4 | 1 |
| Rosenborg BK | Norway | 4 | 2 | 0 | 2 | 0 | 0 | 5 | 1 | 6 | 0 | 1 | 1 | 1 | 2 | 1 | 2 | 1 | 1 | 6 | 3 | 7 |
| Royal Antwerp F.C. | Belgium | 1 | 0 | 0 | 0 | 0 | 0 | 0 | 0 | 0 | 0 | 0 | 1 | 0 | 4 | 0 | 0 | 0 | 1 | 0 | 4 | 0 |
| S.L. Benfica | Portugal | 2 | 0 | 1 | 0 | 0 | 1 | 0 | 1 | 0 | 0 | 0 | 1 | 0 | 3 | 0 | 0 | 0 | 2 | 0 | 4 | 0 |
| S.S. Folgore Falciano Calcio | San Marino | 2 | 1 | 0 | 1 | 0 | 0 | 3 | 0 | 3 | 1 | 0 | 0 | 3 | 1 | 3 | 2 | 0 | 0 | 6 | 1 | 6 |
| S.S. Lazio | Italy | 4 | 0 | 1 | 0 | 1 | 1 | 1 | 2 | 1 | 0 | 0 | 2 | 1 | 7 | 0 | 0 | 1 | 3 | 2 | 9 | 1 |
| S.S. Murata | San Marino | 2 | 1 | 0 | 1 | 0 | 0 | 3 | 1 | 3 | 1 | 0 | 0 | 4 | 0 | 3 | 2 | 0 | 0 | 7 | 1 | 6 |
| S.S.C. Napoli | Italy | 2 | 0 | 1 | 0 | 1 | 0 | 1 | 1 | 1 | 0 | 0 | 1 | 0 | 2 | 0 | 0 | 1 | 1 | 1 | 3 | 1 |
| S.V. Zulte Waregem | Belgium | 2 | 0 | 1 | 0 | 0 | 1 | 1 | 2 | 0 | 0 | 1 | 0 | 1 | 1 | 1 | 0 | 1 | 1 | 2 | 3 | 1 |
| SC Bregenz | Austria | 2 | 0 | 1 | 0 | 0 | 1 | 0 | 2 | 0 | 0 | 0 | 1 | 1 | 3 | 0 | 0 | 0 | 2 | 1 | 5 | 0 |
| SD Crvena Zvezda | Serbia | 8 | 1 | 3 | 0 | 3 | 1 | 3 | 5 | 3 | 0 | 2 | 2 | 5 | 8 | 2 | 0 | 5 | 3 | 8 | 13 | 5 |
| Servette FC | Switzerland | 2 | 0 | 1 | 0 | 0 | 1 | 0 | 3 | 0 | 0 | 0 | 1 | 1 | 3 | 0 | 0 | 0 | 2 | 1 | 6 | 0 |
| Shamrock Rovers F.C. | Republic of Ireland | 4 | 1 | 1 | 0 | 1 | 1 | 0 | 1 | 1 | 1 | 0 | 1 | 1 | 2 | 3 | 1 | 1 | 2 | 1 | 3 | 4 |
| Shirak SC | Armenia | 2 | 1 | 0 | 1 | 0 | 0 | 4 | 0 | 3 | 0 | 1 | 0 | 2 | 2 | 1 | 1 | 1 | 0 | 6 | 2 | 4 |
| SK Gjøvik-Lyn | Norway | 2 | 1 | 0 | 1 | 0 | 0 | 6 | 0 | 3 | 1 | 0 | 0 | 1 | 0 | 3 | 2 | 0 | 0 | 7 | 0 | 6 |
| SK Rapid Wien | Austria | 6 | 1 | 2 | 2 | 1 | 0 | 8 | 3 | 7 | 0 | 0 | 3 | 2 | 7 | 0 | 2 | 1 | 3 | 10 | 10 | 7 |
| SK Slavia Prague | Czech Republic | 2 | 1 | 0 | 1 | 0 | 0 | 2 | 0 | 3 | 0 | 1 | 0 | 0 | 0 | 1 | 1 | 1 | 0 | 2 | 0 | 4 |
| ŠK Slovan Bratislava | Slovakia | 4 | 2 | 0 | 1 | 1 | 0 | 2 | 1 | 4 | 1 | 1 | 0 | 3 | 1 | 4 | 2 | 2 | 0 | 5 | 2 | 8 |
| SK Sturm Graz | Austria | 2 | 0 | 1 | 0 | 0 | 1 | 0 | 1 | 0 | 0 | 0 | 1 | 0 | 3 | 0 | 0 | 0 | 2 | 0 | 4 | 0 |
| Śląsk Wrocław | Poland | 2 | 0 | 1 | 0 | 1 | 0 | 2 | 2 | 1 | 0 | 0 | 1 | 1 | 5 | 0 | 0 | 1 | 1 | 3 | 7 | 1 |
| Sliema Wanderers F.C. | Malta | 2 | 1 | 0 | 1 | 0 | 0 | 3 | 0 | 3 | 1 | 0 | 0 | 2 | 1 | 3 | 2 | 0 | 0 | 5 | 1 | 6 |
| Sporting CP | Portugal | 2 | 0 | 1 | 0 | 0 | 1 | 0 | 2 | 0 | 0 | 0 | 1 | 1 | 16 | 0 | 0 | 0 | 2 | 1 | 18 | 0 |
| St Joseph's F.C. | Gibraltar | 2 | 1 | 0 | 1 | 0 | 0 | 6 | 0 | 3 | 1 | 0 | 0 | 4 | 0 | 3 | 2 | 0 | 0 | 10 | 0 | 6 |
| Standard Liège | Belgium | 2 | 0 | 1 | 0 | 0 | 1 | 0 | 1 | 0 | 0 | 0 | 1 | 1 | 5 | 0 | 0 | 0 | 2 | 1 | 6 | 0 |
| SV Werder Bremen | Germany | 5 | 0 | 1 | 0 | 1 | 2 | 2 | 9 | 1 | 0 | 1 | 1 | 0 | 5 | 1 | 0 | 2 | 3 | 2 | 14 | 2 |
| The New Saints F.C. | Wales | 2 | 1 | 0 | 1 | 0 | 0 | 3 | 0 | 3 | 0 | 1 | 0 | 0 | 0 | 1 | 1 | 1 | 0 | 3 | 0 | 4 |
| Torino F.C. | Italy | 2 | 0 | 1 | 0 | 1 | 0 | 1 | 1 | 1 | 0 | 0 | 1 | 0 | 3 | 0 | 0 | 1 | 1 | 1 | 4 | 1 |
| Tottenham Hotspur F.C. | England | 6 | 0 | 2 | 0 | 1 | 2 | 2 | 6 | 1 | 0 | 0 | 3 | 1 | 12 | 0 | 0 | 1 | 5 | 3 | 18 | 1 |
| Trabzonspor | Turkey | 6 | 1 | 1 | 1 | 1 | 1 | 5 | 4 | 4 | 0 | 0 | 3 | 2 | 6 | 0 | 1 | 1 | 4 | 7 | 10 | 4 |
| TSV 1860 Munich | Germany | 2 | 0 | 1 | 0 | 0 | 1 | 1 | 2 | 0 | 0 | 0 | 1 | 0 | 8 | 0 | 0 | 0 | 2 | 1 | 10 | 0 |
| U.S. Città di Palermo | Italy | 2 | 0 | 1 | 0 | 0 | 1 | 0 | 4 | 0 | 0 | 0 | 1 | 1 | 2 | 0 | 0 | 0 | 2 | 1 | 6 | 0 |
| UN Käerjéng 97 | Luxembourg | 2 | 1 | 0 | 1 | 0 | 0 | 5 | 0 | 3 | 1 | 0 | 0 | 2 | 1 | 3 | 2 | 0 | 0 | 7 | 1 | 6 |
| USC CSKA Sofia | Bulgaria | 6 | 0 | 3 | 1 | 2 | 0 | 6 | 3 | 5 | 0 | 0 | 3 | 2 | 8 | 0 | 1 | 2 | 3 | 8 | 11 | 5 |
| Valletta F.C. | Malta | 2 | 1 | 0 | 1 | 0 | 0 | 6 | 0 | 3 | 1 | 0 | 0 | 2 | 0 | 3 | 2 | 0 | 0 | 8 | 0 | 6 |
| Vasas SC | Hungary | 2 | 0 | 1 | 1 | 0 | 0 | 1 | 0 | 3 | 0 | 0 | 1 | 0 | 8 | 0 | 1 | 0 | 1 | 1 | 8 | 3 |
| VfB Stuttgart | Germany | 4 | 0 | 2 | 0 | 0 | 2 | 1 | 8 | 0 | 0 | 0 | 2 | 0 | 15 | 0 | 0 | 0 | 4 | 1 | 23 | 0 |
| Victoria București | Romania | 2 | 0 | 1 | 0 | 0 | 1 | 0 | 1 | 0 | 0 | 0 | 1 | 0 | 3 | 0 | 0 | 0 | 2 | 0 | 4 | 0 |
| Villarreal | Spain | 2 | 0 | 0 | 0 | 0 | 1 | 0 | 2 | 0 | 0 | 0 | 1 | 0 | 4 | 0 | 0 | 0 | 2 | 0 | 6 | 0 |
| Waterford F.C. | Republic of Ireland | 2 | 1 | 0 | 1 | 0 | 0 | 2 | 0 | 3 | 0 | 0 | 1 | 1 | 2 | 0 | 1 | 0 | 1 | 3 | 2 | 3 |
| Wisła Kraków | Poland | 4 | 1 | 1 | 1 | 1 | 0 | 5 | 3 | 4 | 0 | 0 | 2 | 2 | 6 | 0 | 1 | 1 | 2 | 7 | 9 | 4 |
| Total | | 672 | 117 | 174 | 144 | 75 | 117 | 513 | 456 | 507 | 62 | 58 | 216 | 285 | 824 | 244 | 206 | 133 | 333 | 798 | 1280 | 751 |

For purposes of comparison the calculated rating system used is: win = 3 points, draw = 1 point, defeat = 0 points.

The matches for the group stages are included in the list, but not in the columns "Qualifications" and "Exclusion" because they were not knockout matches.

=== UEFA coefficient ===
The table below shows the points of Cyprus per season (UEFA coefficient).

| Season | R | C | SC |
|---|---|---|---|
| 1963-64 | 29 | 2.000 | 2.000 |
| 1964-65 | 30 | 2.000 | 0.000 |
| 1965-66 | 31 | 2.500 | 0.500 |
| 1966-67 | 31 | 2.500 | 0.000 |
| 1967-68 | 31 | 3.000 | 0.500 |
| 1968-69 | 33 | 1.000 | 0.000 |
| 1969-70 | 33 | 1.000 | 0.000 |
| 1970-71 | 33 | 1.000 | 0.500 |
| 1971-72 | 33 | 1.000 | 0.000 |
| 1972-73 | 33 | 1.666 | 0.666 |
| 1973-74 | 33 | 1.499 | 0.333 |
| 1974-75 | 32 | 1.499 | 0.000 |
| 1975-76 | 32 | 1.999 | 1.000 |
| 1976-77 | 29 | 3.665 | 1.666 |

| Season | R | C | SC |
|---|---|---|---|
| 1977-78 | 29 | 3.332 | 0.333 |
| 1978-79 | 29 | 3.999 | 1.000 |
| 1979-80 | 27 | 5.332 | 1.333 |
| 1980-81 | 27 | 4.998 | 0.666 |
| 1981-82 | 29 | 4.332 | 1.000 |
| 1982-83 | 28 | 5.332 | 1.333 |
| 1983-84 | 29 | 4.998 | 0.666 |
| 1984-85 | 30 | 4.665 | 1.000 |
| 1985-86 | 27 | 5.999 | 2.000 |
| 1986-87 | 27 | 6.665 | 1.666 |
| 1987-88 | 28 | 6.332 | 1.000 |
| 1988-89 | 29 | 5.666 | 0.000 |
| 1989-90 | 27 | 5.666 | 1.000 |
| 1990-91 | 28 | 4.666 | 1.000 |

| Season | R | C | SC |
|---|---|---|---|
| 1991-92 | 29 | 4.000 | 1.000 |
| 1992-93 | 30 | 3.666 | 6.666 |
| 1993-94 | 27 | 6.332 | 2.666 |
| 1994-95 | 23 | 10.665 | 5.333 |
| 1995-96 | 24 | 12.665 | 3.000 |
| 1996-97 | 23 | 16.665 | 5.000 |
| 1997-98 | 25 | 20.332 | 4.333 |
| 1998-99 | 25 | 12.665 | 2.500 |
| 1999-00 | 27 | 11.498 | 2.166 |
| 2000-01 | 29 | 10.832 | 1.000 |
| 2001-02 | 29 | 9.332 | 1.333 |
| 2002-03 | 28 | 10.165 | 3.166 |
| 2003-04 | 29 | 8.998 | 1.333 |
| 2004-05 | 29 | 8.165 | 1.333 |

| Season | R | C | SC |
|---|---|---|---|
| 2005-06 | 28 | 10.165 | 3.000 |
| 2006-07 | 27 | 10.582 | 1.750 |
| 2007-08 | 28 | 10.082 | 2.666 |
| 2008-09 | 23 | 15.082 | 6.333 |
| 2009-10 | 21 | 17.999 | 4.250 |
| 2010-11 | 20 | 18.124 | 3.125 |
| 2011-12 | 16 | 25.499 | 9.125 |
| 2012-13 | 14 | 26.833 | 4.000 |
| 2013-14 | 18 | 23.250 | 2.750 |
| 2014-15 | 18 | 22.300 | 3.300 |
| 2015-16 | 19 | 22.175 | 3.000 |
| 2016-17 | 24 | 18.550 | 5.500 |
| 2017-18 | 19 | 21.550 | 7.000 |
| 2018-19 | 18 | 24.925 | 6.125 |

| Season | R | C | SC |
|---|---|---|---|
| 2019-20 | 16 | 26.750 | 5.125 |
| 2020-21 | 15 | 27.750 | 4.000 |
| 2021-22 | 21 | 26.375 | 4.125 |

== See also ==
- Football in Cyprus

== Sources ==
- Πενήντα χρόνια από τα πρώτα μας βήματα [Fifty years from our first steps]. www.sigmalive.com (in Greek). 27 July 2013.
- "Cyprus's greatest European nights". UEFA. 18 October 2014.
- Οι Ομάδες μας στους ομίλους [Our teams to the group stage]. www.kerkida.net (in Greek).

== Bibliography ==
- Stephanidis, Giorgos (2003). 40 χρόνια κυπριακές ομάδες στην Ευρώπη [40 years Cypriot teams in Europe] (in Greek). Nicosia: Haravgi. ISBN 9963-8841-1-3.
- Gavreilides, Michalis; Papamoiseos, Stelios (2001). Ένας αιώνας Κυπριακό ποδόσφαιρο [One century Cypriot football] (in Greek). Nicosia: The writer. ISBN 9963-8720-1-8.
- Meletiou, Giorgos (2011). Κυπριακό ποδόσφαιρο 1900–1960 [Cypriot Football 1900–1960] (in Greek). Nicosia: Power Publishing. ISBN 978-9963-688-87-6.
