= 2002–03 Cypriot Cup =

Tournament details
- Country: Cyprus
- Dates: 14 September 2002 – 17 May 2003
- Teams: 54

Final positions
- Champions: Anorthosis (9th title)

The 2002–03 Cypriot Cup was the 61st edition of the Cypriot Cup. A total of 54 clubs entered the competition. It began on 14 September 2002 with the first round and concluded on 17 May 2003 with the final which was held at GSP Stadium. Anorthosis won their 8th Cypriot Cup trophy after beating AEL 5–3 on penalties in the final.

== Format ==
In the 2002–03 Cypriot Cup, participated all the teams of the Cypriot First Division, the Cypriot Second Division, the Cypriot Third Division and 12 of the 14 teams of the Cypriot Fourth Division.

The competition consisted of seven rounds. In the first and in the second round each tie was played as a single leg and was held at the home ground of one of the two teams, according to the draw results. Each tie winner was qualifying to the next round. If a match was drawn, extra time was following. If extra time was drawn, the winner was decided by penalty shoot-out.

The third round was played in a two-legged format, each team playing a home and an away match against their opponent. The team which scored more goals on aggregate, was qualifying to the next round. If the two teams scored the same number of goals on aggregate, then the team which scored more goals away from home was advancing to the next round.

If both teams had scored the same number of home and away goals, then extra time was following after the end of the second leg match. If during the extra thirty minutes both teams had managed to score, but they had scored the same number of goals, then the team who scored the away goals was advancing to the next round (i.e. the team which was playing away). If there weren't scored any goals during extra time, the qualifying team was determined by penalty shoot-out.

In the next round, the teams were drawn into four groups of four. The teams of each group played against each other twice, once at their home and once away. The group winners and runners-up of each group advanced to the next round.

The quarter-finals and semi-finals were played over two legs and the same format as in the third round was applied. The final was a single match.

The cup winner secured a place in the 2003–04 UEFA Cup.

== First round ==
In the first round participated all the teams of the Cypriot Second Division and the Cypriot Third Division and 12 of the 14 teams of the Cypriot Fourth Division. The two fourth division teams which were promoted from the 2002 STOK promotion play-offs to the 2002–03 Cypriot Fourth Division after finishing to the second and third place (Evagoras Pallikarides Agion Trimithias and AOL Omonia Lakatamias) did not participate in the Cypriot Cup. Olympos Xylofagou which finished first in the 2002 STOK promotion play-offs, participated in the Cypriot Cup.

| Team 1 | Score | Team 2 |
|---|---|---|
| AEK Kythreas (D) | 4–0 | Rotsidis Mammari (D) |
| AEM Mesogis (C) | 3–1 | Frenaros FC 2000 (D) |
| AEZ Zakakiou (C) | 0–1 | Kinyras Empas (C) |
| APEP F.C. (B) | 3–2 | SEK Agiou Athanasiou (B) |
| ASIL Lysi (B) | 2–0^{1} | AMEP Parekklisia (D) |
| AEK/Achilleas Ayiou Theraponta (B) | 4–0 | Iraklis Gerolakkou (C) |
| Achyronas Liopetriou (C) | 0–4 | Anagennisi Deryneia (B) |
| Akritas Chlorakas (C) | 1–2 | Adonis Idaliou (C) |
| Anagennisi Lythrodonta (D) | 1–0 | Orfeas Nicosia (D) |
| Anagennisi Germasogeias (B) | 1–2 | Enosis Kokkinotrimithia (B) |
| ENTHOI Lakatamia FC (B) | 2–1 | Sourouklis Troullon (C) |
| Elpida Xylofagou (C) | 4–3 | Doxa Katokopias F.C. (B) |
| Ermis Aradippou (B) | 0–5 | MEAP Nisou (C) |
| Ethnikos Assia F.C. (B) | 5–1 | Elia Lythrodonta (C) |
| Chalkanoras Idaliou (B) | 9–1 | Apollon Lympion (D) |
| Olympos Xylofagou (D) | 2–4 | PAEEK FC (C) |
| Omonia Aradippou (C) | 4–0 | Ethnikos Latsion (D) |
| Onisilos Sotira (B) | 1–0 | Ayia Napa F.C. (B) |
| Othellos Athienou F.C. (C) | 8–1 | Ellinismos Akakiou (D) |
| PEFO Olympiakos (D) | 2–4 | ATE PEK Ergaton (D) |

^{1}AMEP Parekklisia did not appear in the stadium. Match was awarded 2–0 to ASIL Lysi.

== Second round ==
In the second round participated the winners of the first round ties.

| Team 1 | Score | Team 2 |
|---|---|---|
| APEP F.C. (B) | 1–3 | AEM Mesogis (C) |
| ASIL Lysi (B) | 2–1 | AEK/Achilleas Ayiou Theraponta (B) |
| Adonis Idaliou (C) | 2–3 | PAEEK FC (C) |
| Anagennisi Lythrodonta (D) | 2–1 | Omonia Aradippou (C) |
| Elpida Xylofagou (C) | 2–1 | Onisilos Sotira (B) |
| Enosis Kokkinotrimithia (B) | 2–1 | Anagennisi Deryneia (B) |
| Ethnikos Assia F.C. (B) | 4–2 | AEK Kythreas (D) |
| Chalkanoras Idaliou (B) | 0–2 | ENTHOI Lakatamia FC (B) |
| Kinyras Empas (C) | 2–1 | ATE PEK Ergaton (D) |
| MEAP Nisou (C) | 2–0 | Othellos Athienou F.C. (C) |

== Third round ==
In the third round participated the winners of the second round ties and six teams of the Cypriot First Division (the teams which finished 9th, 10th, 11th in the 2001–02 Cypriot First Division and the three teams which promoted from the 2001-02 Cypriot Second Division). The first eight teams of the 2001-02 Cypriot First Division did not participate in this round.

| Team 1 | Agg. | Team 2 | 1st leg | 2nd leg |
|---|---|---|---|---|
| AEM Mesogis (C) | 3–5 | Ethnikos Assia F.C. (B) | 3–3 | 0–2 |
| Alki Larnaca F.C. (A) | 3–0 | MEAP Nisou (C) | 2–0 | 1–0 |
| Anagennisi Lythrodonta (D) | 5–6 | PAEEK FC (C) | 3–2 | 1–4 |
| Digenis Akritas Morphou (A) | 2–1 | AEP Paphos F.C. (A) | 1–0 | 1–1 |
| ENTHOI Lakatamia FC (B) | 5–4 | Kinyras Empas (C) | 3–3 | 2–1 |
| Elpida Xylofagou (C) | 0–7 | Apollon Limassol (A) | 0–2 | 0–5 |
| Enosis Kokkinotrimithia (B) | 3–9 | Aris Limassol F.C. (A) | 2–3 | 1–6 |
| Nea Salamis Famagusta FC (A) | 3–1 | ASIL Lysi (B) | 2–1 | 1–0 |

== Group stage ==
In the group stage participated the eight winners of the third round ties and the eight teams of the 2002–03 Cypriot First Division which did not participated in the third round, that were the teams which finished in the first eight places in the 2001–02 Cypriot First Division. The first four teams of the 2001–02 Cypriot First Division (APOEL Nicosia, Anorthosis Famagusta, AEL Limassol, Omonia Nicosia) were set heads of each group and the 5th–8th placed teams (Olympiakos Nicosia, Ethnikos Achna, AEK Larnaca, Enosis Neon Paralimni) were drawn one per group. The eight teams which advanced from the third round were drawn without limitations.

The teams of each group played against each other twice, once at their home and once away. The group winners and runners-up of each group advanced to the next round.

=== Group A ===
Final table
| Pos | Team | Pld | W | D | L | GF | GA | GD | Pts | Qualification |
|---|---|---|---|---|---|---|---|---|---|---|
| 1 | APOEL (A) | 6 | 4 | 0 | 2 | 19 | 11 | +8 | 12 | Advanced to Quarter-Finals |
| 2 | AEK Larnaca (A) | 6 | 3 | 2 | 1 | 17 | 11 | +6 | 11 (Note: AEK 1-1 Apollon; Apollon 2-2 AEK) | Advanced to Quarter-Finals |
| 3 | Apollon (A) | 6 | 3 | 2 | 1 | 16 | 8 | +8 | 11 | |
| 4 | Aris Limassol (A) | 6 | 0 | 0 | 6 | 4 | 26 | −22 | 0 | |

Rules for classification: 1) Points; 2) Head-to-head points; 3) Head-to-head goal difference; 4) Head-to-head away goals scored; 5) Goal difference; 6) Goals scored.
Notes:

Results
| Home \ Away | APN | AEK | APL | ARS |
|---|---|---|---|---|
| APOEL | | 4–5 | 3–2 | 5–0 |
| AEK Larnaca | 1–2 | | 1–1 | 4–0 |
| Apollon | 2–1 | 2–2 | | 3–0 |
| Aris Limassol | 1–4 | 2–4 | 1–6 | |

Legend: Blue = home team win; Yellow = draw; Red = away team win.

=== Group B ===
Final table
| Pos | Team | Pld | W | D | L | GF | GA | GD | Pts | Qualification |
|---|---|---|---|---|---|---|---|---|---|---|
| 1 | Anorthosis (A) | 6 | 5 | 1 | 0 | 16 | 4 | +12 | 16 | Advanced to Quarter-Finals |
| 2 | Ethnikos Achna (A) | 6 | 4 | 1 | 1 | 14 | 4 | +10 | 13 | Advanced to Quarter-Finals |
| 3 | Alki Larnaca (A) | 6 | 1 | 0 | 5 | 6 | 14 | −8 | 3 (Note: Alki 2-3 Ethnikos As.; Ethnikos As. 1-4 Alki) | |
| 4 | Ethnikos Assia (B) | 6 | 1 | 0 | 5 | 5 | 19 | −14 | 3 | |

Rules for classification: 1) Points; 2) Head-to-head points; 3) Head-to-head goal difference; 4) Head-to-head away goals scored; 5) Goal difference; 6) Goals scored.
Notes:

Results
| Home \ Away | ANR | EAC | ALK | EAS |
|---|---|---|---|---|
| Anorthosis | | 2–2 | 4–0 | 4–1 |
| Ethnikos Achna | 1–2 | | 1–0 | 1–0 |
| Alki Larnaca | 0–1 | 0–4 | | 2–3 |
| Ethnikos Assia | 0–3 | 0–5 | 1–4 | |

Legend: Blue = home team win; Yellow = draw; Red = away team win.

=== Group C ===
Final table
| Pos | Team | Pld | W | D | L | GF | GA | GD | Pts | Qualification |
|---|---|---|---|---|---|---|---|---|---|---|
| 1 | AEL (A) | 6 | 5 | 1 | 0 | 18 | 5 | +13 | 16 | Advanced to Quarter-Finals |
| 2 | Enosis Neon Paralimni (A) | 6 | 4 | 1 | 1 | 16 | 8 | +8 | 13 | Advanced to Quarter-Finals |
| 3 | PAEEK FC (C) | 6 | 1 | 0 | 5 | 11 | 23 | −12 | 3 (Note: PAEEK 6-1 Th.O.I.; Th.O.I. 3-1 PAEEK) | |
| 4 | THOI Lakatamia (B) | 6 | 1 | 0 | 5 | 8 | 17 | −9 | 3 | |

Rules for classification: 1) Points; 2) Head-to-head points; 3) Head-to-head goal difference; 4) Head-to-head away goals scored; 5) Goal difference; 6) Goals scored.
Notes:

Results
| Home \ Away | AEL | ENP | PKK | THL |
|---|---|---|---|---|
| AEL | | 1–0 | 7–2 | 3–0 |
| Enosis Neon Paralimni | 2–2 | | 4–0 | 4–3 |
| PAEEK FC | 1–4 | 1–4 | | 6–1 |
| THOI Lakatamia | 0–1 | 1–2 | 3–1 | |

Legend: Blue = home team win; Yellow = draw; Red = away team win.

=== Group D ===
Final table
| Pos | Team | Pld | W | D | L | GF | GA | GD | Pts | Qualification |
|---|---|---|---|---|---|---|---|---|---|---|
| 1 | Omonia (A) | 6 | 4 | 1 | 1 | 12 | 6 | +6 | 13 | Advanced to Quarter-Finals |
| 2 | Olympiakos (A) | 6 | 4 | 0 | 2 | 17 | 3 | +14 | 12 | Advanced to Quarter-Finals |
| 3 | Digenis Morphou (A) | 6 | 3 | 1 | 2 | 7 | 8 | −1 | 10 | |
| 4 | Nea Salamina (A) | 6 | 0 | 0 | 6 | 5 | 24 | −19 | 0 | |

Rules for classification: 1) Points; 2) Head-to-head points; 3) Head-to-head goal difference; 4) Head-to-head away goals scored; 5) Goal difference; 6) Goals scored.

Results
| Home \ Away | OMN | OLM | DGN | NSL |
|---|---|---|---|---|
| Omonia | | 1–0 | 1–1 | 6–2 |
| Olympiakos | 1–2 | | 2–0 | 5–0 |
| Digenis Morphou | 1–0 | 0–3 | | 3–1 |
| Nea Salamina | 1–2 | 0–6 | 1–2 | |

Legend: Blue = home team win; Yellow = draw; Red = away team win.

== Quarter-finals ==
In the quarter-finals participated all the teams which qualified from the group stage. The group winners were drawn against the runners-up, with the group winners hosting the second leg. Teams from the same group could not be drawn against each other.

| Team 1 | Agg. | Team 2 | 1st leg | 2nd leg |
|---|---|---|---|---|
| Ethnikos Achna | 0–2 | APOEL | 0–2 | 0–0 |
| Olympiakos | 3–4 | AEL Limassol | 2–1 | 1–3 |
| AEK Larnaca | 2–6 | Anorthosis | 0–4 | 2–2 |
| Enosis Neon Paralimni | 3–4 | Omonia | 2–1 | 1–3 |

== Semi-finals ==
| Team 1 | Agg. | Team 2 | 1st leg | 2nd leg |
|---|---|---|---|---|
| AEL Limassol | 6–3 | Omonia | 2–1 | 4–2 |
| APOEL | 1–2 | Anorthosis | 0–2 | 1–0 |

== Final ==
17 May 2003

| Anorthosis | 0–0 (a.e.t.) | AEL Limassol |
Penalties
| Neophytou (penalty scored); Michalski (penalty scored); Nicolaou (penalty scored); Tomić (penalty scored); Ketsbaia (penalty scored) | 5–3 | (penalty missed) Garpozis; (penalty scored) N'Diaye; (penalty scored) Pittas; (penalty scored) Luciano |

GSP Stadium, Nicosia
Attendance: 13,377
Referee: Panikos Kailis

Cypriot Cup 2002–03 winners

9th title

== See also ==
- Cypriot Cup
- 2002–03 Cypriot First Division

== Sources ==
- "2002/03 Cyprus Cup". Rec.Sport.Soccer Statistics Foundation. 2016-01-14.
- Papamoiseos, Stelios (2013). Από την ενοποίηση... στα αστέρια [From unification... to the stars] (in Greek). Nicosia: The writer. pp. 126–127.
