= 2001–02 Cypriot Cup =

Tournament details
- Country: Cyprus
- Dates: 7 November 2001 – 11 May 2002
- Teams: 50

Final positions
- Champions: Anorthosis (8th title)

The 2001–02 Cypriot Cup was the 60th edition of the Cypriot Cup. A total of 50 clubs entered the competition. It began on 7 November 2001 with the preliminary round and concluded on 11 May 2002 with the final which was held at GSP Stadium. Anorthosis won their 8th Cypriot Cup trophy after beating Ethnikos Achna 1–0 in the final.

== Format ==
In the 2001–02 Cypriot Cup, participated all the teams of the Cypriot First Division, the Cypriot Second Division, the Cypriot Third Division and 8 of the 14 teams of the Cypriot Fourth Division.

The competition consisted of six knock-out rounds. In the preliminary round and in the first round each tie was played as a single leg and was held at the home ground of one of the two teams, according to the draw results. Each tie winner was qualifying to the next round. If a match was drawn, extra time was following. If extra time was drawn, there was a replay at the ground of the team who were away for the first game. If the rematch was also drawn, then extra time was following and if the match remained drawn after extra time the winner was decided by penalty shoot-out.

The next three rounds were played in a two-legged format, each team playing a home and an away match against their opponent. The team which scored more goals on aggregate, was qualifying to the next round. If the two teams scored the same number of goals on aggregate, then the team which scored more goals away from home was advancing to the next round.

If both teams had scored the same number of home and away goals, then extra time was following after the end of the second leg match. If during the extra thirty minutes both teams had managed to score, but they had scored the same number of goals, then the team who scored the away goals was advancing to the next round (i.e. the team which was playing away). If there weren't scored any goals during extra time, the qualifying team was determined by penalty shoot-out.

The cup winner secured a place in the 2002–03 UEFA Cup.

== Ρreliminary round ==
All the 14 clubs of the Cypriot Second Division, all the 14 clubs of the Cypriot Third Division and 8 clubs from the Cypriot Fourth Division (first eight of the league table the day of draw) participated in the preliminary round.

Team 1	Score	Team 2
Aris Limassol F.C. (B)	2–0	Rotsidis Mammari (C)
PAEEK FC (C)	7–4	PEFO Olympiakos (C)
APEP F.C. (B)	4–0	Chalkanoras Idaliou (B)
AEM Mesogis (D)	5–2	Othellos Athienou F.C. (C)
Anagennisi Lythrodonta (D)	1–2	Anagennisi Germasogeias (B)
Anagennisi Deryneia (B)	1–1, 1–2	Onisilos Sotira (B)
AEK Kythreas (D)	0–2	AEK/Achilleas Ayiou Theraponta (C)
ATE PEK Ergaton (C)	2–3 (a.e.t.)	Omonia Aradippou (B)
Kinyras Empas (C)	1–0	Enosis Kokkinotrimithia (B)
Elia Lythrodonta (C)	2–3	Sourouklis Troullon (C)
ENTHOI Lakatamia FC (B)	4–1	Ethnikos Latsion (D)
AEZ Zakakiou (B)	3–0	AMEP Parekklisia (D)
Digenis Akritas Morphou (B)	5–0	Apollon Lympion (D)
Ayia Napa F.C. (C)	6–3	Th.O.I Avgorou (D)
SEK Agiou Athanasiou (C)	2–1	Adonis Idaliou (B)
ASIL Lysi (B)	0–5	Nea Salamis Famagusta FC (B)
Iraklis Gerolakkou (C)	5–1 (a.e.t.)	Achyronas Liopetriou (D)
Akritas Chlorakas (C)	1–1, 1–4	MEAP Nisou (C)

== First round ==
The 14 clubs of the Cypriot First Division advanced directly to the first round and met the winners of the preliminary round ties:

Team 1	Score	Team 2
AC Omonia (A)	6–1	AEM Mesogis (D)
AEK Larnaca F.C. (A)	3–1	Onisilos Sotira (B)
PAEEK FC (C)	1–7	Olympiakos Nicosia (A)
Doxa Katokopias F.C. (A)	7–0	Kinyras Empas (C)
Ethnikos Assia F.C. (A)	7–0	Sourouklis Troullon (C)
APOEL FC (A)	0–1	Nea Salamis Famagusta FC (B)
AEP Paphos F.C. (A)	3–0	Aris Limassol F.C. (B)
Anagennisi Germasogeias (B)	1–6	AEL Limassol (A)
Ermis Aradippou (A)	5–1	Ayia Napa F.C. (C)
MEAP Nisou (C)	1–3	Apollon Limassol (A)
SEK Agiou Athanasiou (C)	0–4	Ethnikos Achna FC (A)
ENTHOI Lakatamia FC (B)	1–4	Alki Larnaca F.C. (A)
APEP F.C. (B)	0–4	Anorthosis Famagusta FC (A)
Enosis Neon Paralimni FC (A)	6–0	Omonia Aradippou (B)
AEZ Zakakiou (B)	4–1	Iraklis Gerolakkou (C)
Digenis Akritas Morphou (B)	5–0	AEK/Achilleas Ayiou Theraponta (C)

== Second round ==
Team 1	Agg.	Team 2	1st leg	2nd leg
Olympiakos Nicosia (A)	1–3	Anorthosis Famagusta FC (A)	1–1	0–2
Nea Salamis Famagusta FC (B)	7–2	Digenis Akritas Morphou (B)	5–0	2–2
Apollon Limassol (A)	2–2 (a)	AEP Paphos F.C. (A)	1–0	1–2
Enosis Neon Paralimni FC (A)	2–2 (3–2 p)	AEK Larnaca F.C. (A)	2–0	0–2
Doxa Katokopias F.C. (A)	3–6	Ethnikos Achna FC (A)	2–2	1–4
Ethnikos Assia F.C. (A)	2–0	AEZ Zakakiou (B)	2–0	0–0
AEL Limassol (A)	9–1	Ermis Aradippou (A)	4–0	5–1
AC Omonia (A)	7–1	Alki Larnaca F.C. (A)	4–0	3–1

== Quarter-finals ==
Team 1	Agg.	Team 2	1st leg	2nd leg
AC Omonia (A)	6–4	Apollon Limassol (A)	3–0	3–4
Enosis Neon Paralimni FC (A)	4–3	Ethnikos Assia F.C. (A)	4–2	0–1
Anorthosis Famagusta FC (A)	1–0	AEL Limassol (A)	1–0	0–0
Ethnikos Achna FC (A)	2–1	Nea Salamis Famagusta FC (B)	1–1	1–0

== Semi-finals ==
Team 1	Agg.	Team 2	1st leg	2nd leg
Anorthosis Famagusta FC (A)	5–0	AC Omonia (A)	3–0	2–0^{1}
Enosis Neon Paralimni FC (A)	1–1 (a)	Ethnikos Achna FC (A)	1–1	0–0

^{1}The game abandoned at 1–1 in 83' when Omonia fans threw objects on the pitch. Awarded 2–0 to Anorthosis.

== Final ==
11 May 2002

Anorthosis	1–0	Ethnikos Achnas
Chailis 84'

GSP Stadium, Nicosia
Attendance: 9,448
Referee: Louis Loizou

Cypriot Cup 2001–02 Winners
Anorthosis Famagusta
8th title

== Sources ==
- "2001/02 Cyprus Cup". Rec.Sport.Soccer Statistics Foundation. 2016-01-14.
- Papamoiseos, Stelios (2013). Από την ενοποίηση... στα αστέρια [From unification... to the stars] (in Greek). Nicosia: The writer. pp. 122–123.

== See also ==
- Cypriot Cup
- 2001–02 Cypriot First Division
