= 2002–03 Cypriot Fourth Division =

Cypriot Fourth Division
- Season: 2002–03
- Champions: Orfeas (1st title)
- Promoted: Orfeas; Ethnikos; AEK
- Relegated: Rotsidis; PEFO
- Matches played: 156
- Goals scored: 527 (3.38 per match)

The 2002–03 Cypriot Fourth Division was the 18th season of the Cypriot fourth-level football league. Orfeas Nicosia won their 1st title.

== Format ==
Thirteen teams participated in the 2002–03 Cypriot Fourth Division. All teams played against each other twice, once at their home and once away. The team with the most points at the end of the season crowned champions. The first three teams were promoted to the 2003–04 Cypriot Third Division and the last two teams were relegated to regional leagues.

=== Point system ===
Teams received three points for a win, one point for a draw and zero points for a loss.

== Changes from previous season ==
Teams promoted to 2002–03 Cypriot Third Division

- AEM Mesogis
- Elpida Xylofagou
- Achyronas Liopetriou

Teams relegated from 2001–02 Cypriot Third Division

- PEFO Olympiakos
- Rotsidis Mammari
- ATE PEK Ergaton

Teams promoted from regional leagues

- Olympos Xylofagou
- Evagoras Pallikarides Agion Trimithias
- AOL Omonia Lakatamias

Teams relegated to regional leagues

- THOI Avgorou
- AMEK Kapsalou
- ASPIS Pylas
- Proodos Kaimakliou

Notes:

- AMEP Parekklisia withdrew before the start of the season.

== League standings ==
Pos	Team	Pld	W	D	L	GF	GA	GD	Pts	Promotion or relegation
1	Orfeas Nicosia (C, P)	24	17	5	2	58	29	+29	56	Promoted to Cypriot Third Division
2	Ethnikos Latsion FC (P)	24	15	6	3	60	24	+36	51	Promoted to Cypriot Third Division
3	AEK Kythreas (P)	24	13	3	8	59	42	+17	42	Promoted to Cypriot Third Division
4	Olympos Xylofagou	24	13	1	10	48	46	+2	40	
5	Frenaros FC 2000	24	10	5	9	49	35	+14	35	
6	Evagoras Pallikarides Agion Trimithias	24	8	8	8	30	29	+1	32	
7	AOL Omonia Lakatamias	24	8	6	10	37	42	−5	30	
8	Anagennisi Lythrodonta	24	8	4	12	33	44	−11	28	
9	Apollon Lympion	24	8	4	12	28	42	−14	28	
10	Ellinismos Akakiou	24	7	6	11	38	47	−9	27	
11	ATE PEK Ergaton	24	8	3	13	29	47	−18	27	
12	Rotsidis Mammari (R)	24	6	5	13	30	49	−19	23	Relegated to regional leagues
13	PEFO Olympiakos (Note: PEFO Olympiakos withdrew with 3 matches left; their remaining matches were awarded 2–0 to their opponents.) (R)	24	5	4	15	28	51	−23	19	Relegated to regional leagues

Rules for classification: 1) Points, 2) Goal differences, 3) Goals for.
(C) Champions; (P) Promoted; (R) Relegated

== Results ==
Home \ Away	AEK	ANG	AOL	APL	ATE	ETN	ELL	EGR	ORF	PEF	RTS	FRN	OLM
AEK		4–0	3–2	3–1	5–0	1–1	2–4	0–1	1–3	3–1	5–1	3–2	2–3
Anagennisi	3–4		3–1	2–1	3–0	0–3	3–0	0–0	1–2	2–0 (Note: PEFO Olympiakos withdrew with 3 matches left; their remaining matches were awarded 2–0 to their opponents.)	0–1	2–1	2–0
AOL Omonia	1–1	0–0		0–2	2–1	2–1	2–2	0–4	2–2	2–2	4–0	3–1	2–3
Apollon	0–6	3–0	0–0		1–2	0–1	2–1	3–0	2–1	2–1	1–0	4–1	0–3
ATE PEK	1–1	1–5	1–2	2–1		0–5	5–1	0–0	1–2	2–1	4–0	1–1	3–0
Ethnikos	2–1	4–1	2–1	7–1	5–1		5–2	1–1	1–1	2–0	2–3	2–1	3–1
Ellinismos	5–2	0–0	2–1	0–0	3–0	0–2		4–3	1–1	3–0	1–2	1–1	1–1
Evagoras	3–1	1–0	0–1	1–1	0–1	2–2	0–2		2–2	0–0	1–0	2–2	2–1
Orfeas	4–2	2–1	4–2	2–1	4–0	3–2	2–1	1–3		5–2	4–1	3–1	4–1
PEFO	2–4	2–1	2–4	5–1	0–1	0–2	2–0	1–0	0–2		0–1	0–8	5–2
Rotsidis	0–1	3–3	0–1	1–1	2–1	1–1	4–1	2–3	0–0	2–2		0–3	2–3
Frenaros FC	1–2	4–1	3–0	1–0	1–0	1–1	5–2	2–0	1–2	0–0	3–1		3–2
Olympos	1–2	7–0	3–2	2–0	2–1	0–3	2–1	2–1	0–2	2–0	4–3	3–2	

Legend: Blue = home team win; Yellow = draw; Red = away team win.

== See also ==
- Cypriot Fourth Division
- 2002–03 Cypriot First Division
- 2002–03 Cypriot Cup

== Sources ==
- "2002/03 Cypriot Fourth Division". Rec.Sport.Soccer Statistics Foundation. 2016-01-14.
