= 2001–02 Cypriot Third Division =

Cypriot Third Division
- Season: 2001–02
- Champions: SEK (1st title)
- Promoted: SEK; Ayia Napa; AEK/Achilleas
- Relegated: PEFO; Rotsidis; ATE PEK
- Matches played: 182
- Goals scored: 645 (3.54 per match)

The 2001–02 Cypriot Third Division was the 31st season of the Cypriot third-level football league. SEK Agiou Athanasiou won their 1st title.

== Format ==
Fourteen teams participated in the 2001–02 Cypriot Third Division. All teams played against each other twice, once at their home and once away. The team with the most points at the end of the season crowned champions. The first three teams were promoted to the 2002–03 Cypriot Second Division and the last three teams were relegated to the 2002–03 Cypriot Fourth Division.

=== Point system ===
Teams received three points for a win, one point for a draw and zero points for a loss.

== Changes from previous season ==
Teams promoted to 2001–02 Cypriot Second Division

- ASIL Lysi
- Adonis Idaliou
- Enosis Kokkinotrimithia

Teams relegated from 2000–01 Cypriot Second Division

- Kinyras Empas
- Rotsidis Mammari
- AEK/Achilleas Ayiou Theraponta

Teams promoted from 2000–01 Cypriot Fourth Division

- Sourouklis Troullon
- PEFO Olympiakos
- ATE PEK Ergaton

Teams relegated to 2001–02 Cypriot Fourth Division

- Ethnikos Latsion FC
- AMEP Parekklisia
- THOI Avgorou

== League standings ==
| Pos | Team | Pld | W | D | L | GF | GA | GD | Pts | Promotion or relegation |
|---|---|---|---|---|---|---|---|---|---|---|
| 1 | SEK Agiou Athanasiou (C, P) | 26 | 16 | 7 | 3 | 66 | 33 | +33 | 55 | Promoted to Cypriot Second Division |
| 2 | Ayia Napa (P) | 26 | 14 | 7 | 5 | 71 | 38 | +33 | 49 | Promoted to Cypriot Second Division |
| 3 | AEK/Achilleas Ayiou Theraponta (P) | 26 | 14 | 7 | 5 | 65 | 37 | +28 | 49 | Promoted to Cypriot Second Division |
| 4 | Akritas Chlorakas | 26 | 15 | 3 | 8 | 50 | 34 | +16 | 48 | |
| 5 | PAEEK FC | 26 | 13 | 6 | 7 | 51 | 38 | +13 | 45 | |
| 6 | Elia Lythrodonta | 26 | 12 | 6 | 8 | 33 | 32 | +1 | 42 | |
| 7 | MEAP Nisou | 26 | 12 | 5 | 9 | 49 | 33 | +16 | 41 | |
| 8 | Othellos Athienou | 26 | 11 | 7 | 8 | 42 | 35 | +7 | 40 | |
| 9 | Iraklis Gerolakkou | 26 | 11 | 5 | 10 | 51 | 43 | +8 | 38 | |
| 10 | Kinyras Empas | 26 | 10 | 4 | 12 | 40 | 42 | −2 | 34 | |
| 11 | Sourouklis Troullon | 26 | 9 | 5 | 12 | 33 | 47 | −14 | 32 | |
| 12 | PEFO Olympiakos (R) | 26 | 4 | 4 | 18 | 30 | 64 | −34 | 16 | Relegated to Cypriot Fourth Division |
| 13 | Rotsidis Mammari (R) | 26 | 3 | 4 | 19 | 37 | 82 | −45 | 13 | Relegated to Cypriot Fourth Division |
| 14 | ATE PEK Ergaton (R) | 26 | 3 | 0 | 23 | 27 | 87 | −60 | 9 | Relegated to Cypriot Fourth Division |

Rules for classification: 1) Points, 2) Goal differences, 3) Goals for.
(C) Champions; (P) Promoted; (R) Relegated

== Results ==
| Home \ Away | ANP | AEK | AKR | ATE | ELL | IRK | KNR | MPN | OTL | PKK | PEF | RTS | SEK | SRK |
|---|---|---|---|---|---|---|---|---|---|---|---|---|---|---|
| Ayia Napa | | 1–1 | 3–0 | 6–2 | 2–0 | 8–2 | 2–0 | 4–1 | 1–1 | 1–2 | 3–1 | 1–4 | 3–3 | 3–1 |
| AEK/Achilleas | 2–2 | | 3–0 | 5–0 | 3–0 | 1–1 | 4–2 | 2–0 | 3–3 | 1–1 | 3–2 | 6–0 | 4–2 | 4–1 |
| Akritas | 1–5 | 1–0 | | 3–0 | 4–1 | 2–1 | 4–2 | 3–1 | 0–1 | 4–0 | 3–0 | 5–0 | 1–1 | 2–1 |
| ATE PEK | 0–6 | 3–7 | 2–7 | | 1–3 | 0–3 | 0–2 | 3–2 | 0–2 | 1–2 | 4–3 | 5–1 | 0–2 | 2–3 |
| Elia | 1–1 | 0–1 | 0–0 | 1–0 | | 4–0 | 1–0 | 2–1 | 2–1 | 2–1 | 3–1 | 2–1 | 2–3 | 1–1 |
| Iraklis | 5–1 | 0–2 | 6–1 | 5–0 | 1–2 | | 4–0 | 3–2 | 2–1 | 2–1 | 2–2 | 2–0 | 0–1 | 0–2 |
| Kinyras | 2–4 | 2–1 | 0–2 | 3–0 | 1–0 | 0–0 | | 1–1 | 1–0 | 3–2 | 8–0 | 4–1 | 1–2 | 4–1 |
| MEAP | 0–1 | 1–1 | 2–1 | 3–1 | 3–0 | 2–1 | 4–0 | | 3–0 | 1–1 | 0–0 | 5–0 | 3–3 | 3–2 |
| Othellos | 3–1 | 3–0 | 0–1 | 1–0 | 2–0 | 3–0 | 3–3 | 2–1 | | 1–4 | 2–0 | 2–1 | 2–2 | 1–2 |
| PAEEK FC | 1–1 | 2–1 | 2–1 | 2–1 | 2–3 | 1–1 | 1–0 | 1–0 | 2–2 | | 3–0 | 7–1 | 1–3 | 3–1 |
| PEFO | 0–3 | 1–3 | 0–1 | 7–1 | 1–1 | 2–4 | 1–0 | 0–5 | 1–2 | 0–2 | | 4–1 | 1–4 | 1–2 |
| Rotsidis | 2–7 | 3–4 | 2–2 | 2–0 | 1–2 | 1–1 | 0–1 | 1–2 | 2–2 | 2–2 | 1–2 | | 4–7 | 6–1 |
| SEK | 1–1 | 3–0 | 0–1 | 3–0 | 0–0 | 4–1 | 4–0 | 0–1 | 2–2 | 4–3 | 3–0 | 4–0 | | 2–1 |
| Sourouklis | 2–0 | 3–3 | 1–0 | 3–1 | 0–0 | 0–4 | 0–0 | 0–2 | 1–0 | 1–2 | 0–0 | 2–0 | 1–3 | |

Legend: Blue = home team win; Yellow = draw; Red = away team win.

== See also ==
- Cypriot Third Division
- 2001–02 Cypriot First Division
- 2001–02 Cypriot Cup

== Sources ==
- "2001/02 Cypriot Third Division". Rec.Sport.Soccer Statistics Foundation. 2016-01-14.
