= 2001–02 Cypriot Fourth Division =

Cypriot Fourth Division
- Season: 2001–02
- Champions: AEM (1st title)
- Promoted: AEM; Elpida; Achyronas
- Relegated: THOI Av. AMEK; ASPIS; Proodos
- Matches played: 210
- Goals scored: 734 (3.5 per match)

The 2001–02 Cypriot Fourth Division was the 17th season of the Cypriot fourth-level football league. AEM Mesogis won their 1st title.

== Format ==
Fifteen teams participated in the 2001–02 Cypriot Fourth Division. All teams played against each other twice, once at their home and once away. The team with the most points at the end of the season crowned champions. The first three teams were promoted to the 2002–03 Cypriot Third Division and the last four teams were relegated to regional leagues.

=== Point system ===
Teams received three points for a win, one point for a draw and zero points for a loss.

== Changes from previous season ==
Teams promoted to 2001–02 Cypriot Third Division

- Sourouklis Troullon
- PEFO Olympiakos
- ATE PEK Ergaton

Teams relegated from 2000–01 Cypriot Third Division

- Ethnikos Latsion FC
- AMEP Parekklisia
- THOI Avgorou

Teams promoted from regional leagues

- Orfeas Nicosia
- AEM Mesogis
- Frenaros FC
- Proodos Kaimakliou

Teams relegated to regional leagues

- APEP Pelendriou
- AEK Kakopetrias
- Doxa Paliometochou

Notes:

- AEK Kythreas were additionally admitted to participate in the 2001–02 Cypriot Fourth Division as they were a refugee team (originally located in Northern Cyprus); they were relegated to the amateur divisions after 1999–2000 season and suspended their operations in 2000. They resumed operations in 2001 and according to a specific regulation, the refugees football clubs that were resuming their operations could participate in the Cypriot Fourth Division. So, AEK's application to participate in the fourth division was accepted.
- Anagennisi Prosfigon Lemesou withdrew for 2001–02 Cypriot Fourth Division.

== League standings ==
Pos	Team	Pld	W	D	L	GF	GA	GD	Pts	Promotion or relegation
1	AEM Mesogis (C, P)	28	18	5	5	62	24	+38	59	Promoted to Cypriot Third Division
2	Elpida Xylofagou (P)	28	18	4	6	55	41	+14	58	Promoted to Cypriot Third Division
3	Achyronas Liopetriou (P)	28	16	4	8	58	41	+17	52	Promoted to Cypriot Third Division
4	Ethnikos Latsion FC	28	14	8	6	55	35	+20	50	
5	Orfeas Nicosia	28	15	4	9	56	37	+19	49	
6	AMEP Parekklisia	28	12	8	8	49	44	+5	44	
7	Frenaros FC	28	11	7	10	58	52	+6	40	
8	AEK Kythreas	28	12	4	12	57	53	+4	40	
9	Apollon Lympion	28	11	7	10	55	56	−1	40	
10	Anagennisi Lythrodonta	28	10	7	11	47	53	−6	37	
11	Ellinismos Akakiou	28	9	9	10	46	55	−9	36	
12	THOI Avgorou (R)	28	9	4	15	37	46	−9	31	Relegated to regional leagues
13	AMEK Kapsalou (R)	28	4	8	16	31	56	−25	20	Relegated to regional leagues
14	ASPIS Pylas (R)	28	4	4	20	25	64	−39	16	Relegated to regional leagues
15	Proodos Kaimakliou (R)	28	4	3	21	43	77	−34	15	Relegated to regional leagues

Rules for classification: 1) Points, 2) Goal differences, 3) Goals for.
(C) Champions; (P) Promoted; (R) Relegated

== Results ==
Home \ Away	AEK	AEM	AMP	AMK	ANL	APL	ASP	ACL	ETN	ELL	ELP	TAG	ORF	PRK	FRN
AEK		0–1	2–1	4–1	5–1	2–1	3–0	0–4	0–1	1–1	2–3	2–2	4–2	3–1	3–1
AEM	2–0		4–2	3–1	5–0	4–0	2–0	2–1	3–1	5–1	3–1	1–0	2–0	2–1	6–1
AMEP	4–3	1–1		2–0	1–1	1–2	3–0	1–0	1–1	3–1	3–3	1–0	1–3	2–1	3–2
AMEK	0–2	1–1	1–2		2–2	0–1	2–1	0–1	1–3	4–1	1–3	1–2	1–1	2–0	1–1
Anagennisi	1–1	2–1	2–0	1–0		2–2	0–0	2–0	1–2	1–4	1–4	3–0	1–3	5–2	2–2
Apollon	2–3	1–1	0–0	4–0	3–2		3–1	2–2	2–2	2–3	0–2	2–1	5–2	3–3	3–1
ASPIS	3–2	1–0	0–1	0–0	0–1	0–3		0–0	0–0	2–3	1–0	1–3	1–7	1–3	0–4
Achyronas	3–2	1–2	1–3	7–2	1–0	3–1	2–1		2–0	4–3	3–0	0–0	2–1	3–1	4–2
Ethnikos	3–1	2–1	1–1	0–0	1–3	1–1	7–0	4–2		1–1	5–0	2–1	0–1	4–2	2–1
Ellinismos	1–1	1–0	3–3	1–1	2–2	1–2	3–6	2–1	2–2		1–1	2–1	0–1	2–1	1–0
Elpida	3–1	2–1	1–0	4–1	4–2	3–1	3–2	1–1	2–1	3–1		2–1	1–0	2–0	3–2
THOI	1–4	1–4	2–0	1–3	0–3	5–1	3–2	2–3	1–2	1–1	3–0		1–0	3–1	0–0
Orfeas	5–0	0–0	2–2	3–1	2–0	3–2	1–0	2–3	1–3	2–1	2–1	1–0		6–0	1–1
Proodos	1–3	1–4	3–6	2–2	2–4	2–3	4–2	2–3	3–1	2–0	1–2	1–2	1–3		1–1
Frenaros FC	4–3	1–1	4–1	3–2	4–2	6–3	1–0	3–1	1–3	2–3	1–1	3–0	3–1	3–1	

Legend: Blue = home team win; Yellow = draw; Red = away team win.

== See also ==
- Cypriot Fourth Division
- 2001–02 Cypriot First Division
- 2001–02 Cypriot Cup

== Sources ==
- "2001/02 Cypriot Fourth Division". Rec.Sport.Soccer Statistics Foundation. 2016-01-14.
