= 2002–03 Cypriot Third Division =

Cypriot Third Division
- Season: 2002–03
- Champions: PAEEK FC (2nd title)
- Promoted: PAEEK FC; Akritas; Omonia Ar.
- Relegated: Othellos; Achyronas; Elia
- Matches played: 182
- Goals scored: 644 (3.54 per match)

The 2002–03 Cypriot Third Division was the 32nd season of the Cypriot third-level football league. PAEEK FC won their 2nd title.

== Format ==
Fourteen teams participated in the 2002–03 Cypriot Third Division. All teams played against each other twice, once at their home and once away. The team with the most points at the end of the season crowned champions. The first three teams were promoted to the 2003–04 Cypriot Second Division and the last three teams were relegated to the 2003–04 Cypriot Fourth Division.

=== Point system ===
Teams received three points for a win, one point for a draw and zero points for a loss.

== Changes from previous season ==
Teams promoted to 2002–03 Cypriot Second Division

- SEK Agiou Athanasiou
- Ayia Napa
- AEK/Achilleas Ayiou Theraponta

Teams relegated from 2001–02 Cypriot Second Division

- Omonia Aradippou
- AEZ Zakakiou
- Adonis Idaliou

Teams promoted from 2001–02 Cypriot Fourth Division

- AEM Mesogis
- Elpida Xylofagou
- Achyronas Liopetriou

Teams relegated to 2002–03 Cypriot Fourth Division

- PEFO Olympiakos
- Rotsidis Mammari
- ATE PEK Ergaton

== League standings ==
Pos	Team	Pld	W	D	L	GF	GA	GD	Pts	Promotion or relegation
1	PAEEK FC (C, P)	26	19	3	4	68	28	+40	60	Promoted to Cypriot Second Division
2	Akritas Chlorakas (P)	26	17	5	4	75	23	+52	56	Promoted to Cypriot Second Division
3	Omonia Aradippou (P)	26	17	2	7	53	41	+12	53	Promoted to Cypriot Second Division
4	AEM Mesogis	26	15	3	8	50	36	+14	48	
5	MEAP Nisou	26	13	3	10	47	43	+4	42	
6	Sourouklis Troullon	26	11	4	11	33	46	−13	37	
7	Adonis Idaliou	26	10	4	12	42	44	−2	34	
8	Kinyras Empas	26	9	6	11	38	43	−5	33	
9	AEZ Zakakiou	26	10	3	13	40	54	−14	33	
10	Elpida Xylofagou	26	9	5	12	40	42	−2	32	
11	Iraklis Gerolakkou	26	9	2	15	45	51	−6	29	
12	Othellos (R)	26	7	6	13	41	55	−14	27	Relegated to Cypriot Fourth Division
13	Achyronas Liopetriou (R)	26	5	7	14	43	61	−18	22	Relegated to Cypriot Fourth Division
14	Elia Lythrodonta (R)	26	4	1	21	29	77	−48	13	Relegated to Cypriot Fourth Division

Rules for classification: 1) Points, 2) Goal differences, 3) Goals for.
(C) Champions; (P) Promoted; (R) Relegated

== Results ==
Home \ Away	ADN	AEZ	AEM	AKR	ACL	ELL	ELP	IRK	KNR	MPN	OTL	OMN	PKK	SRK
Adonis		1–1	1–3	1–0	4–0	3–0	1–2	2–0	2–1	4–3	1–0	1–4	0–1	4–0
AEZ	2–4		2–1	0–4	2–1	1–0	2–1	3–5	2–1	0–2	3–1	1–2	2–0	0–2
AEM	4–1	1–0		2–0	3–3	3–0	3–1	3–2	4–3	1–0	3–0	3–2	2–3	2–1
Akritas	1–0	5–0	3–0		3–3	7–2	1–1	3–2	1–1	2–2	7–2	6–1	2–0	6–0
Achyronas	1–0	1–1	0–5	0–5		2–0	2–4	3–2	1–1	3–4	1–1	1–2	1–3	0–1
Elia	0–2	2–1	0–3	0–6	1–6		1–4	1–2	1–3	1–2	3–0	2–3	1–3	1–2
Elpida	1–1	1–1	2–0	0–2	0–2	3–0		1–2	3–0	1–0	2–1	2–3	1–2	1–1
Iraklis	0–0	2–4	0–1	1–2	2–2	3–4	2–0		0–1	6–1	2–1	1–2	1–3	2–1
Kinyras	1–1	3–4	3–1	0–1	4–2	1–0	4–3	1–2		3–0	0–0	0–0	0–2	3–0
MEAP	4–3	1–3	2–2	1–0	4–3	1–0	2–0	2–0	3–0		0–0	4–0	1–2	2–0
Othellos	4–1	4–0	1–0	0–0	0–0	11–3	5–2	2–4	3–1	1–2		0–3	1–1	3–1
Omonia	3–1	2–1	3–0	0–4	5–4	0–2	2–1	2–1	0–1	2–1	7–0		2–2	2–1
PAEEK FC	7–3	5–3	3–0	3–2	2–0	3–3	1–2	2–0	5–0	2–0	5–0	0–1		3–0
Sourouklis	1–0	2–1	0–0	1–2	2–1	2–1	1–1	4–1	2–2	4–3	3–0	1–0	0–5	

Legend: Blue = home team win; Yellow = draw; Red = away team win.

== See also ==
- Cypriot Third Division
- 2002–03 Cypriot First Division
- 2002–03 Cypriot Cup

== Sources ==
- "2002/03 Cypriot Third Division". Rec.Sport.Soccer Statistics Foundation. 2016-01-14.
