= 2003–04 Cypriot Fourth Division =

Cypriot Fourth Division
- Season: 2003–04
- Champions: Othellos (1st title)
- Promoted: Othellos; Achyronas; ENAD
- Relegated: ATE PEK; Th.O.I. Filias; Evagoras
- Matches played: 182
- Goals scored: 584 (3.21 per match)

The 2003–04 Cypriot Fourth Division was the 19th season of the Cypriot fourth-level football league. Othellos Athienou won their 1st title.

== Format ==
Fourteen teams participated in the 2003–04 Cypriot Fourth Division. All teams played against each other twice, once at their home and once away. The team with the most points at the end of the season crowned champions. The first three teams were promoted to the 2004–05 Cypriot Third Division and the last three teams were relegated to regional leagues.

=== Point system ===
Teams received three points for a win, one point for a draw and zero points for a loss.

== Changes from previous season ==
Teams promoted to 2003–04 Cypriot Third Division

- Orfeas Nicosia
- Ethnikos Latsion FC
- AEK Kythreas

Teams relegated from 2002–03 Cypriot Third Division

- Othellos Athienou
- Achyronas Liopetriou
- Elia Lythrodonta

Teams promoted from regional leagues

- ENAD Polis Chrysochous
- Spartakos Kitiou
- THOI Filias

Teams relegated to regional leagues

- Rotsidis Mammari
- PEFO Olympiakos

== League standings ==
Pos	Team	Pld	W	D	L	GF	GA	GD	Pts	Promotion or relegation
1	Othellos (C, P)	26	20	3	3	67	20	+47	63	Promoted to Cypriot Third Division
2	Achyronas Liopetriou (P)	26	15	6	5	64	27	+37	51	Promoted to Cypriot Third Division
3	ENAD Polis Chrysochous (P)	26	15	6	5	41	27	+14	51	Promoted to Cypriot Third Division
4	Frenaros FC	26	14	2	10	48	39	+9	44	
5	Olympos Xylofagou	26	11	7	8	43	39	+4	40	
6	Spartakos Kitiou	26	10	9	7	49	35	+14	39	
7	Elia Lythrodonta	26	10	5	11	43	40	+3	35	
8	AOL Omonia Lakatamias	26	9	6	11	36	43	−7	33	
9	Ellinismos Akakiou	26	9	6	11	35	45	−10	33	
10	Anagennisi Lythrodonta	26	8	7	11	34	39	−5	31	
11	Apollon Lympion	26	8	6	12	42	47	−5	30	
12	ATE PEK Ergaton (R)	26	7	6	13	32	57	−25	27	Relegated to regional leagues
13	Th.O.I. Filias (R)	26	5	6	15	28	51	−23	21	Relegated to regional leagues
14	Evagoras Pallikarides Agion Trimithias (R)	26	1	5	20	22	75	−53	8	Relegated to regional leagues

Rules for classification: 1) Points, 2) Goal differences, 3) Goals for.
(C) Champions; (P) Promoted; (R) Relegated

== Results ==
Home \ Away	ANG	AOL	APL	ATE	ACH	ELT	ELN	END	EGR	THF	OTL	OLM	SPR	FRN
Anagennisi		0–1	1–2	2–1	0–1	0–0	3–1	1–1	2–0	0–0	0–2	2–1	2–4	5–1
AOL Omonia	0–3		1–1	1–1	0–4	1–1	1–2	4–0	4–0	2–1	2–1	2–0	0–0	2–1
Apollon	0–0	2–1		5–2	1–2	0–0	0–1	2–0	3–0	1–0	0–2	1–3	3–4	1–0
ATE PEK	3–4	0–0	2–1		2–3	1–0	1–0	1–1	3–1	0–0	0–3	0–0	3–1	1–4
Achyronas	1–1	5–1	1–1	8–0		0–1	2–1	1–1	2–1	1–1	3–1	3–1	0–1	2–1
Elia	1–2	4–2	2–0	4–0	1–7		0–1	2–3	12–2	0–0	2–0	0–2	3–1	2–0
Ellinismos	1–1	1–4	4–4	2–1	1–2	3–1		0–1	4–2	1–1	1–5	3–0	0–0	1–0
ENAD	2–0	1–0	2–1	4–0	2–0	3–0	2–1		2–2	2–1	0–0	4–3	3–2	0–1
Evagoras	3–1	1–2	2–2	2–4	1–6	1–2	2–2	0–2		0–3	0–0	0–1	0–3	0–1
Th.O.I.	2–1	1–0	3–2	1–3	1–7	1–2	0–2	0–1	7–2		2–5	0–0	1–4	1–2
Othellos	3–0	2–0	3–2	2–0	3–1	1–1	5–0	2–1	2–0	2–0		2–0	2–1	6–2
Olympos	0–0	3–2	2–4	5–1	2–2	4–2	4–0	2–1	2–0	1–0	0–6		1–1	4–1
Spartakos	4–2	1–1	3–1	1–1	0–0	4–0	2–2	0–1	0–0	7–0	1–5	1–1		3–1
Frenaros FC	4–1	7–2	6–2	2–1	1–0	1–0	1–0	1–1	3–0	3–1	1–2	1–1	2–0	

Legend: Blue = home team win; Yellow = draw; Red = away team win.

== See also ==
- Cypriot Fourth Division
- 2003–04 Cypriot First Division
- 2003–04 Cypriot Cup

== Sources ==
- "2003/04 Cypriot Fourth Division". Rec.Sport.Soccer Statistics Foundation. 2016-01-14.
