= 2000–01 Cypriot Fourth Division =

Cypriot Fourth Division
- Season: 2000–01
- Champions: Sourouklis (1st title)
- Promoted: Sourouklis; PEFO; ATE PEK
- Relegated: APEP; AEK; Doxa
- Matches played: 182
- Goals scored: 533 (2.93 per match)

The 2000–01 Cypriot Fourth Division was the 16th season of the Cypriot fourth-level football league. Sourouklis Troullon won their 1st title.

== Format ==
Fourteen teams participated in the 2000–01 Cypriot Fourth Division. All teams played against each other twice, once at their home and once away. The team with the most points at the end of the season crowned champions. The first three teams were promoted to the 2001–02 Cypriot Third Division and the last three teams were relegated to regional leagues.

=== Point system ===
Teams received three points for a win, one point for a draw and zero points for a loss.

== Changes from previous season ==
Teams promoted to 2000–01 Cypriot Third Division

- MEAP Nisou
- Elia Lythrodonta
- THOI Lakatamia
- AMEP Parekklisia

Teams relegated from 1999–2000 Cypriot Third Division

- Achyronas Liopetriou
- Ellinismos Akakiou
- Doxa Paliometochou

Teams promoted from regional leagues

- Anagennisi Lythrodonta
- Anagennisi Prosfigon Lemesou
- ASPIS Pylas
- Sourouklis Troullon

Teams relegated to regional leagues

- AEK Kythreas
- Orfeas Nicosia
- PAOK Kalou Choriou

== League standings ==
Pos	Team	Pld	W	D	L	GF	GA	GD	Pts	Promotion or relegation
1	Sourouklis Troullon (C, P)	26	18	2	6	51	20	+31	56	Promoted to Cypriot Third Division
2	PEFO Olympiakos (P)	26	16	3	7	49	31	+18	51	Promoted to Cypriot Third Division
3	ATE PEK Ergaton (P)	26	13	5	8	43	31	+12	44	Promoted to Cypriot Third Division
4	Anagennisi Prosfigon Lemesou	26	11	8	7	32	27	+5	41	
5	AMEK Kapsalou	26	12	3	11	31	35	−4	39	
6	Anagennisi Lythrodonta	26	11	5	10	27	27	0	38	
7	Ellinismos Akakiou	26	10	7	9	39	33	+6	37	
8	ASPIS Pylas	26	10	6	10	49	36	+13	36	
9	Achyronas Liopetriou	26	10	6	10	36	26	+10	36	
10	Elpida Xylofagou	26	11	3	12	46	44	+2	36	
11	Apollon Lympion	26	10	6	10	45	49	−4	36	
12	APEP Pelendriou (R)	26	10	5	11	34	51	−17	35	Relegated to regional leagues
13	AEK Kakopetrias (R)	26	7	5	14	37	52	−15	26	Relegated to regional leagues
14	Doxa Paliometochou (R)	26	0	2	24	14	71	−57	2	Relegated to regional leagues

Rules for classification: 1) Points, 2) Goal differences, 3) Goals for.
(C) Champions; (P) Promoted; (R) Relegated

== Results ==
Home \ Away	AEK	AMK	ANL	ANP	APP	APL	ASP	ATE	ACH	DOX	ELL	ELP	PEF	SRK
AEK		0–2	3–0	0–3	3–2	0–1	1–1	1–1	2–2	4–1	3–0	3–2	0–3	2–3
AMEK	3–1		2–1	1–1	0–1	3–1	2–1	2–2	1–2	1–0	1–0	3–2	1–4	0–2
Anagennisi L.	1–0	3–0		2–1	3–0	2–1	1–1	1–1	1–0	2–0	2–0	3–0	0–2	0–2
Anagennisi Pr.	3–3	3–1	0–0		3–1	0–0	0–3	1–0	1–0	3–0	1–0	0–0	0–0	2–1
APEP	0–0	2–0	1–0	0–2		4–2	2–1	3–1	2–1	1–0	1–1	1–1	1–1	1–0
Apollon	3–1	0–2	1–1	1–2	5–1		3–3	1–0	2–1	2–0	2–2	3–2	3–2	1–4
ASPIS	3–0	0–1	2–1	1–0	3–2	3–1		0–2	1–1	3–2	0–1	2–3	3–2	0–1
ATE PEK	5–3	2–1	0–0	5–0	1–3	0–3	3–2		1–0	2–1	1–2	3–1	3–1	1–0
Achyronas	3–0	0–0	1–2	2–0	2–0	4–0	2–2	1–3		2–0	1–0	3–1	1–2	2–3
Doxa	1–2	0–2	0–1	0–2	1–1	2–2	0–8	1–2	0–1		2–3	1–4	1–3	0–1
Ellinismos	4–1	2–1	2–0	3–3	7–2	2–2	0–0	1–1	0–3	3–0		2–1	3–1	0–1
Elpida	1–2	2–0	1–0	0–0	4–2	3–0	0–3	0–3	1–0	10–0	1–0		1–3	1–0
PEFO	2–1	0–1	3–0	2–1	2–0	3–2	2–1	1–0	0–0	3–1	1–0	6–2		0–3
Sourouklis	2–1	3–0	3–0	1–0	7–0	2–3	3–2	1–0	1–1	3–0	1–1	1–2	2–0	

Legend: Blue = home team win; Yellow = draw; Red = away team win.

== See also ==
- Cypriot Fourth Division
- 2000–01 Cypriot First Division
- 2000–01 Cypriot Cup

== Sources ==
- "2000/01 Cypriot Fourth Division". Rec.Sport.Soccer Statistics Foundation. 2016-01-14.
