= 2002–03 Cypriot Second Division =

Cypriot Second Division
- Season: 2002–03
- Champions: Anagennisi D. (2nd title)
- Promoted: Anagennisi D.; Doxa; Onisilos
- Relegated: Chalkanoras; AEK/Achilleas; Anagennisi G.
- Matches played: 182
- Goals scored: 628 (3.45 per match)

The 2002–03 Cypriot Second Division was the 48th season of the Cypriot second-level football league. Anagennisi Deryneia won their 2nd title.

== Format ==
Fourteen teams participated in the 2002–03 Cypriot Second Division. All teams played against each other twice, once at their home and once away. The team with the most points at the end of the season crowned champions. The first three teams were promoted to 2003–04 Cypriot First Division and the last three teams were relegated to the 2003–04 Cypriot Third Division.

== Changes from previous season ==
Teams promoted to 2002–03 Cypriot First Division

- Nea Salamina
- Digenis Morphou
- Aris Limassol

Teams relegated from 2001–02 Cypriot First Division

- Ethnikos Assia
- Doxa Katokopias
- Ermis Aradippou

Teams promoted from 2001–02 Cypriot Third Division

- SEK Agiou Athanasiou
- Ayia Napa
- AEK/Achilleas Ayiou Theraponta

Teams relegated to 2002–03 Cypriot Third Division

- Omonia Aradippou
- AEZ Zakakiou
- Adonis Idaliou

== League standings ==
Pos	Team	Pld	W	D	L	GF	GA	GD	Pts	Promotion or relegation
1	Anagennisi Deryneia (C, P)	26	18	2	6	53	27	+26	56	Promoted to Cypriot First Division
2	Doxa Katokopias (P)	26	15	7	4	63	26	+37	52	Promoted to Cypriot First Division
3	Onisilos Sotira (P)	26	14	8	4	48	34	+14	50	Promoted to Cypriot First Division
4	ASIL Lysi	26	12	7	7	45	38	+7	43	
5	Ethnikos Assia	26	12	6	8	51	34	+17	42	
6	Ayia Napa	26	10	6	10	43	47	−4	36	
7	Ermis Aradippou	26	9	8	9	51	48	+3	35	
8	THOI Lakatamia	26	9	7	10	47	43	+4	34	
9	Enosis Kokkinotrimithia	26	9	5	12	35	47	−12	32	
10	SEK Agiou Athanasiou	26	8	7	11	38	47	−9	31	
11	APEP	26	9	4	13	39	56	−17	31	
12	Chalkanoras Idaliou (R)	26	8	5	13	39	41	−2	29	Relegated to Cypriot Third Division
13	AEK/Achilleas Ayiou Theraponta (R)	26	7	5	14	44	63	−19	26	Relegated to Cypriot Third Division
14	Anagennisi Germasogeias (R)	26	3	1	22	32	77	−45	10	Relegated to Cypriot Third Division

Rules for classification: 1) Points, 2) Goal differences, 3) Goal for
(C) Champions; (P) Promoted; (R) Relegated

== Results ==
Home \ Away	ANP	AEK	ANG	AND	APP	ASL	DOX	ETN	ENK	ERM	THL	ONS	SEK	CHL
Ayia Napa		2–1	5–0	1–0	4–1	2–2	3–3	1–0	2–0	2–2	3–2	1–4	3–0	1–0
AEK/Achilleas Ayiou Theraponta	2–2		7–3	2–3	3–3	0–3	3–3	1–3	4–1	2–5	3–0	1–2	1–1	2–3
Anagennisi G.	3–0	1–2		0–4	2–3	1–2	1–4	1–5	4–5	2–4	1–2	3–4	2–1	1–3
Anagennisi D.	2–0	5–1	3–2		1–0	3–1	1–3	3–2	5–0	2–1	1–0	1–1	2–1	2–1
APEP	2–1	2–1	1–0	1–4		3–0	0–0	1–1	1–2	3–3	2–7	2–3	3–0	1–2
ASIL	4–1	1–0	1–1	1–0	6–3		1–0	0–2	2–0	2–1	3–3	0–1	1–0	2–2
Doxa	4–0	1–2	1–0	0–1	3–0	2–0		1–1	3–1	3–1	5–3	1–1	5–0	4–1
Ethnikos Assia	3–1	4–0	5–1	0–2	0–1	2–1	0–3		3–0	2–0	4–1	2–2	2–2	3–2
Enosis	2–1	3–0	3–0	2–3	0–1	3–1	1–3	1–1		4–1	0–0	1–0	1–3	0–0
Ermis	3–2	2–1	5–1	0–0	5–2	1–1	1–5	0–1	4–1		1–0	5–2	1–1	2–2
THOI	1–1	8–0	3–0	3–2	2–1	2–3	0–0	2–2	0–0	0–0		2–1	2–1	1–4
Onisilos	0–0	1–1	3–1	3–2	2–1	1–1	2–1	2–1	0–1	1–1	3–2		4–0	1–0
SEK Agiou Athanasiou	4–1	0–2	1–0	1–0	4–0	3–5	2–2	3–2	1–1	4–1	2–0	1–1		2–2
Chalkanoras	2–3	1–2	0–1	0–1	0–1	1–1	0–3	2–0	4–2	2–1	0–1	2–3	3–0	

Legend: Blue = home team win; Yellow = draw; Red = away team win.

== See also ==
- Cypriot Second Division
- 2002–03 Cypriot First Division
- 2002–03 Cypriot Cup

== Sources ==
- "2002/03 Cypriot Second Division". Rec.Sport.Soccer Statistics Foundation. 2016-01-14.
