= 2004–05 Cypriot Fourth Division =

Cypriot Fourth Division
- Season: 2004–05
- Champions: Frenaros (1st title)
- Promoted: Frenaros; Digenis; Atromitos
- Relegated: Anagennisi L. Th.O.I. Apollon
- Matches played: 182
- Goals scored: 564 (3.1 per match)

The 2004–05 Cypriot Fourth Division was the 20th season of the Cypriot fourth-level football league. Frenaros FC won their 1st title.

== Format ==
Fourteen teams participated in the 2004–05 Cypriot Fourth Division. All teams played against each other twice, once at their home and once away. The team with the most points at the end of the season crowned champions. The first three teams were promoted to the 2005–06 Cypriot Third Division and the last three teams were relegated to regional leagues.

=== Point system ===
Teams received three points for a win, one point for a draw and zero points for a loss.

== Changes from previous season ==
Teams promoted to 2004–05 Cypriot Third Division

- Othellos Athienou
- Achyronas Liopetriou
- ENAD Polis Chrysochous

Teams relegated from 2003–04 Cypriot Third Division

- Ethnikos Latsion FC
- Anagennisi Germasogeias
- Sourouklis Troullon

Teams promoted from regional leagues

- Atromitos Yeroskipou
- Digenis Oroklinis
- THOI Avgorou

Teams relegated to regional leagues

- Rotsidis Mammari
- PEFO Olympiakos

== League standings ==
Pos	Team	Pld	W	D	L	GF	GA	GD	Pts	Promotion or relegation
1	Frenaros FC (C, P)	26	17	5	4	46	26	+20	56	Promoted to Cypriot Third Division
2	Digenis Oroklinis (P)	26	17	4	5	63	36	+27	55	Promoted to Cypriot Third Division
3	Atromitos Yeroskipou (P)	26	15	4	7	53	27	+26	49	Promoted to Cypriot Third Division
4	Olympos Xylofagou	26	15	4	7	46	26	+20	49	
5	Anagennisi Germasogeias	26	14	6	6	48	18	+30	48	
6	AOL Omonia Lakatamias	26	13	6	7	44	34	+10	45	
7	Spartakos Kitiou	26	11	6	9	36	36	0	39	
8	Ethnikos Latsion FC	26	10	4	12	43	45	−2	34	
9	Sourouklis Troullon	26	10	2	14	38	53	−15	32	
10	Elia Lythrodonta	26	8	6	12	39	47	−8	30	
11	Ellinismos Akakiou	26	9	2	15	34	59	−25	29	
12	Anagennisi Lythrodonta (R)	26	5	9	12	29	42	−13	24	Relegated to regional leagues
13	THOI Avgorou (R)	26	6	6	14	45	63	−18	24	Relegated to regional leagues
14	Apollon Lympion (Note: Apollon Lympion withdrew from the championship before the start of the season. All their games were awarded to their opponents with a 2–0 scoreline.) (R)	26	0	0	26	0	52	−52	0	Relegated to regional leagues

Rules for classification: 1) Points, 2) Goal differences, 3) Goals for.
(C) Champions; (P) Promoted; (R) Relegated

== Results ==
Home \ Away	ANG	ANL	AOL	APL	ATR	DGN	ETN	ELT	ELN	THA	OLM	SRK	SPR	FRN
Anagennisi G.		2–0	1–1	2–0	1–1	4–2	2–0	5–0	4–0	1–2	1–1	3–0	4–0	0–0
Anagennisi L.	2–1		0–3	2–0	2–3	3–2	2–2	1–1	0–1	2–3	1–1	1–3	0–1	2–2
AOL Omonia	0–3	2–1		2–0	1–0	0–5	2–1	1–1	4–2	4–2	0–2	5–0	0–0	3–0
Apollon (Note: Apollon Lympion withdrew from the championship before the start of the season. All their games were awarded to their opponents with a 2–0 scoreline.)	0–2	0–2	0–2		0–2	0–2	0–2	0–2	0–2	0–2	0–2	0–2	0–2	0–2
Atromitos	0–2	3–1	3–0	2–0		2–4	2–0	2–0	5–0	3–0	0–1	3–0	5–0	0–0
Digenis	1–1	4–0	1–4	2–0	3–2		2–0	3–3	2–1	4–3	2–0	0–2	3–1	5–2
Ethnikos Latsion FC	1–1	0–0	2–0	2–0	2–0	0–4		5–1	3–4	3–2	1–4	4–5	0–2	0–1
Elia	1–2	1–2	2–0	2–0	1–4	1–2	2–3		3–1	2–1	2–1	4–1	2–0	1–1
Ellinismos	1–0	1–1	2–0	2–0	2–3	1–2	1–2	3–2		3–3	1–0	0–3	3–1	1–2
THOI	0–2	1–1	3–4	2–0	2–2	0–0	2–5	2–2	5–1		1–7	4–2	0–2	1–2
Olympos	1–0	1–1	1–4	2–0	1–1	1–2	2–1	3–1	3–0	3–1		0–1	2–0	3–2
Sourouklis	2–4	2–1	2–2	2–0	0–2	2–4	0–3	1–0	1–0	2–2	1–2		1–2	2–3
Spartakos	1–0	1–1	0–0	2–0	1–2	1–1	1–1	1–1	7–1	4–1	1–0	2–1		1–4
Frenaros FC	1–0	1–0	0–0	2–0	3–1	2–1	3–0	2–1	3–0	2–0	1–2	2–0	3–2	

Legend: Blue = home team win; Yellow = draw; Red = away team win.

== See also ==
- Cypriot Fourth Division
- 2004–05 Cypriot First Division
- 2004–05 Cypriot Cup

== Sources ==
- "2004/05 Cypriot Fourth Division". Rec.Sport.Soccer Statistics Foundation. 2016-01-14.
