= 1996–97 Cypriot Fourth Division =

Cypriot Fourth Division
- Season: 1996–97
- Champions: Adonis (1st title)
- Promoted: Adonis; Achilleas; Enosis
- Relegated: Digenis Or. Digenis Yp. AEK
- Matches played: 182
- Goals scored: 527 (2.9 per match)

The 1996–97 Cypriot Fourth Division was the 12th season of the Cypriot fourth-level football league. Adonis won their 1st title.

== Format ==
Fourteen teams participated in the 1996–97 Cypriot Fourth Division. All teams played against each other twice, once at their home and once away. The team with the most points at the end of the season crowned champions. The first three teams were promoted to the 1997–98 Cypriot Third Division and the last three teams were relegated to regional leagues.

=== Point system ===
Teams received three points for a win, one point for a draw and zero points for a loss.

== Changes from previous season ==
Teams promoted to 1996–97 Cypriot Third Division

- Iraklis Gerolakkou
- ASIL Lysi
- Kinyras Empas

Teams relegated from 1995–96 Cypriot Third Division

- Digenis Oroklinis
- Digenis Akritas Ypsona
- Fotiakos Frenarou

Teams promoted from regional leagues

- Enosis Kokkinotrimithia
- SEK Agiou Athanasiou

Teams relegated to regional leagues

- Ethnikos Defteras
- Livadiakos Livadion
- APEY Ypsona

== League standings ==
| Pos | Team | Pld | W | D | L | GF | GA | GD | Pts | Promotion or relegation |
|---|---|---|---|---|---|---|---|---|---|---|
| 1 | Adonis Idaliou (C, P) | 26 | 19 | 4 | 3 | 54 | 21 | +33 | 61 | Promoted to Cypriot Third Division |
| 2 | Achilleas Ayiou Theraponta (P) | 26 | 15 | 4 | 7 | 55 | 29 | +26 | 49 | Promoted to Cypriot Third Division |
| 3 | Enosis Kokkinotrimithia (P) | 26 | 14 | 6 | 6 | 58 | 33 | +25 | 48 | Promoted to Cypriot Third Division |
| 4 | MEAP Nisou | 26 | 10 | 8 | 8 | 46 | 31 | +15 | 38 | |
| 5 | Poseidonas Giolou | 26 | 10 | 8 | 8 | 31 | 34 | −3 | 38 | |
| 6 | Apollon Lympion | 26 | 10 | 7 | 9 | 31 | 29 | +2 | 37 | |
| 7 | Ellinismos Akakiou | 26 | 10 | 7 | 9 | 33 | 40 | −7 | 37 | |
| 8 | SEK Agiou Athanasiou | 26 | 10 | 6 | 10 | 33 | 35 | −2 | 36 | |
| 9 | AMEK Kapsalou | 26 | 9 | 7 | 10 | 37 | 39 | −2 | 34 | |
| 10 | Doxa Paliometochou | 26 | 9 | 6 | 11 | 35 | 38 | −3 | 33 | |
| 11 | Fotiakos Frenarou | 26 | 10 | 3 | 13 | 32 | 39 | −7 | 33 | |
| 12 | Digenis Oroklinis (R) | 26 | 8 | 7 | 11 | 32 | 34 | −2 | 31 | Relegated to regional leagues |
| 13 | Digenis Akritas Ypsona (R) | 26 | 7 | 2 | 17 | 31 | 68 | −37 | 23 | Relegated to regional leagues |
| 14 | AEK Kythreas (R) | 26 | 3 | 1 | 22 | 19 | 57 | −38 | 10 | Relegated to regional leagues |

Rules for classification: 1) Points, 2) Goal differences, 3) Goals for.
(C) Champions; (P) Promoted; (R) Relegated

== Results ==
| Home \ Away | ADN | AEK | AMK | APL | ACL | DGY | DGO | DOX | ELN | ENS | MPN | POS | SEK | FOT |
|---|---|---|---|---|---|---|---|---|---|---|---|---|---|---|
| Adonis | | 5–0 | 1–1 | 1–0 | 2–1 | 3–1 | 2–0 | 2–1 | 2–1 | 4–0 | 2–0 | 4–0 | 4–0 | 4–1 |
| AEK | 0–3 | | 2–0 | 0–1 | 1–1 | 2–0 | 0–3 | 1–3 | 0–1 | 0–2 | 0–2 | 0–1 | 0–2 | 1–0 |
| AMEK | 0–0 | 2–1 | | 2–2 | 1–3 | 0–1 | 5–2 | 1–2 | 1–0 | 4–2 | 1–1 | 0–0 | 1–0 | 2–0 |
| Apollon | 2–1 | 1–0 | 1–1 | | 2–1 | 3–0 | 0–0 | 1–1 | 3–0 | 1–4 | 0–0 | 2–1 | 3–0 | 1–1 |
| Achilleas | 2–3 | 4–2 | 1–1 | 2–0 | | 5–0 | 2–0 | 1–0 | 5–1 | 0–0 | 2–2 | 6–1 | 1–0 | 2–0 |
| Digenis Yp. | 0–2 | 3–1 | 4–5 | 1–0 | 0–3 | | 1–1 | 2–1 | 0–0 | 3–0 | 2–6 | 1–0 | 4–0 | 0–4 |
| Digenis Or. | 2–0 | 3–0 | 4–1 | 0–1 | 1–2 | 4–1 | | 2–2 | 2–1 | 1–3 | 1–0 | 2–2 | 2–1 | 0–1 |
| Doxa | 1–2 | 4–3 | 2–0 | 1–1 | 0–3 | 3–2 | 3–1 | | 2–1 | 1–0 | 1–1 | 1–1 | 2–2 | 3–0 |
| Ellinismos | 3–3 | 1–0 | 3–2 | 2–1 | 2–1 | 3–1 | 1–1 | 1–0 | | 0–4 | 4–3 | 3–1 | 0–0 | 3–1 |
| Enosis | 5–1 | 3–2 | 3–1 | 2–0 | 5–1 | 9–2 | 0–0 | 1–0 | 2–1 | | 3–3 | 2–0 | 4–1 | 1–1 |
| MEAP | 0–1 | 3–0 | 2–1 | 2–1 | 1–2 | 8–1 | 2–0 | 2–0 | 0–0 | 2–2 | | 1–0 | 1–1 | 2–0 |
| Poseidonas | 0–0 | 2–1 | 2–0 | 3–1 | 2–0 | 2–1 | 2–0 | 2–1 | 0–0 | 0–0 | 1–0 | | 3–3 | 3–1 |
| SEK | 0–1 | 3–0 | 0–2 | 3–2 | 1–0 | 2–0 | 1–0 | 4–0 | 1–1 | 1–0 | 2–1 | 1–1 | | 4–0 |
| Fotiakos | 0–1 | 4–2 | 0–2 | 0–1 | 1–4 | 1–0 | 0–0 | 1–0 | 4–0 | 3–1 | 3–1 | 3–1 | 2–0 | |

Legend: Blue = home team win; Yellow = draw; Red = away team win.

== See also ==
- Cypriot Fourth Division
- 1996–97 Cypriot First Division
- 1996–97 Cypriot Cup

== Sources ==
- "1996/97 Cypriot Fourth Division". Rec.Sport.Soccer Statistics Foundation. 2016-01-14.
