= 2001–02 Cypriot Second Division =

Cypriot Second Division
- Season: 2001–02
- Champions: Nea Salamina (3rd title)
- Promoted: Nea Salamina; Digenis; Aris
- Relegated: Omonia; AEZ; Adonis
- Matches played: 182
- Goals scored: 610 (3.35 per match)

The 2002–03 Cypriot Second Division was the 47th season of the Cypriot second-level football league. Nea Salamina won their 3rd title.

== Format ==
Fourteen teams participated in the 2001–02 Cypriot Second Division. All teams played against each other twice, once at their home and once away. The team with the most points at the end of the season crowned champions. The first three teams were promoted to 2002–03 Cypriot First Division and the last three teams were relegated to the 2002–03 Cypriot Third Division.

== Changes from previous season ==
Teams promoted to 2001–02 Cypriot First Division

- Alki Larnaca
- Ethnikos Assia
- Ermis Aradippou

Teams relegated from 2000–01 Cypriot First Division

- Nea Salamina
- Digenis Morphou
- Aris Limassol

Teams promoted from 2000–01 Cypriot Third Division

- ASIL Lysi
- Adonis Idaliou
- Enosis Kokkinotrimithia

Teams relegated to 2001–02 Cypriot Third Division

- Kinyras Empas
- Rotsidis Mammari
- AEK/Achilleas Ayiou Theraponta

== League standings ==
Pos	Team	Pld	W	D	L	GF	GA	GD	Pts	Promotion or relegation
1	Nea Salamina (C, P)	26	21	3	2	95	22	+73	66	Promoted to Cypriot First Division
2	Digenis Morphou (P)	26	18	1	7	61	24	+37	55	Promoted to Cypriot First Division
3	Aris Limassol (P)	26	15	4	7	60	44	+16	49	Promoted to Cypriot First Division
4	Onisilos Sotira	26	14	3	9	41	38	+3	45	
5	Chalkanoras Idaliou	26	12	4	10	38	34	+4	40	
6	ASIL Lysi	26	10	7	9	42	42	0	37	
7	Anagennisi Deryneia	26	10	6	10	39	32	+7	36	
8	Enosis Kokkinotrimithia	26	8	8	10	33	39	−6	32	
9	Anagennisi Germasogeias (Note: Anagennisi Germasogeias had 3 points deducted for failing to pay old debts to a former manager.)	26	10	4	12	32	46	−14	31	
10	APEP	26	8	7	11	40	58	−18	31	
11	THOI Lakatamia	26	8	6	12	47	50	−3	30	
12	Omonia Aradippou (R)	26	5	9	12	31	56	−25	24	Relegated to Cypriot Third Division
13	AEZ Zakakiou (R)	26	6	6	14	27	55	−28	24	Relegated to Cypriot Third Division
14	Adonis Idaliou (R)	26	2	2	22	24	70	−46	8	Relegated to Cypriot Third Division

Rules for classification: 1) Points, 2) Goal differences, 3) Goal for
(C) Champions; (P) Promoted; (R) Relegated

== Results ==
Home \ Away	ADN	AEZ	ANG	AND	APP	ARS	ASL	DGN	ENK	THO	NSL	OMN	ONS	CHL
Adonis		1–2	0–1	1–1	0–2	0–9	2–3	3–4	0–2	0–1	1–3	3–2	2–5	1–2
AEZ Zakakiou	2–1		0–1	1–3	3–1	2–2	0–0	0–4	0–0	1–0	1–2	1–1	1–1	2–1
Anagennisi G.	2–2	1–0		1–2	3–2	0–4	0–2	1–0	1–2	3–2	1–7	1–0	2–0	2–0
Anagennisi D.	2–3	2–2	0–1		3–1	1–2	1–2	1–0	4–0	4–1	0–1	0–0	0–2	1–0
APEP	2–0	5–2	1–0	2–2		0–0	3–2	0–2	3–3	2–2	2–1	0–0	3–1	2–1
Aris	3–0	0–2	2–0	2–3	4–2		3–2	0–1	4–2	4–3	1–6	3–2	4–1	0–0
ASIL	2–1	3–1	2–1	1–1	5–2	0–2		1–1	1–1	2–2	0–3	3–3	1–2	0–0
Digenis	5–0	6–0	4–3	1–0	6–1	4–2	4–2		0–1	3–1	0–1	4–0	1–2	1–0
Enosis	2–0	1–0	1–1	0–2	1–1	1–2	0–1	0–3		1–1	1–2	4–0	0–3	3–0
THOI	2–1	3–1	3–1	1–0	5–1	1–3	4–1	0–1	6–4		3–3	0–0	1–2	0–1
Nea Salamina	4–0	8–1	5–1	1–1	5–0	7–0	2–1	3–0	1–1	4–1		10–0	3–0	4–2
Omonia	3–1	4–0	2–2	1–3	1–1	1–1	0–1	1–4	2–0	2–1	1–6		1–1	1–3
Onisilos	1–0	2–1	1–0	3–1	2–0	0–3	2–1	0–2	1–2	3–3	2–1	0–1		3–1
Chalkanoras	3–1	2–1	2–2	2–1	4–1	3–0	1–3	1–0	0–0	2–0	1–2	3–2	3–1	

Legend: Blue = home team win; Yellow = draw; Red = away team win.

== See also ==
- 2001–02 Cypriot First Division
- 2001–02 Cypriot Cup

== Sources ==
- "2001/02 Cypriot Second Division". Rec.Sport.Soccer Statistics Foundation. 2016-01-14.
