= Cypriot Fourth Division =

- Founded: 1985
- Folded: 2015
- Country: Cyprus
- Level on pyramid: 4
- Promotion to: Cypriot Third Division
- Relegation to: Cypriot regional levels
- Domestic cup: Cypriot Cup for lower divisions
- Most championships: Achyronas (3 titles)

The Cypriot Fourth Division (Greek: Τέταρτη Κατηγορία) was the fourth tier football league competition in Cyprus, ran by the Cyprus Football Association. Each year, the top finishing teams of the league were promoted to the Cypriot Third Division, and the lowest finishing teams were relegated to the amateur leagues.

== History ==
The Cypriot Fourth Division started the 1985–86 football season as the fourth level of the Cypriot football. The decision was taken by CFA on 23 July 1985.

The first eight seasons the championship was split into three or four geographical groups, representing the Districts of Cyprus. From 1993–94 season until 2014–15 season, the championship was held as a single division. In all seasons, all the teams played against each other twice, once at their home and once away.

The 2014–15 season was the last one ever for the Cypriot Fourth Division, as the league was dissolved and replaced by the STOK Elite Division, which is conducted under the auspices of Confederation of local federations of Cyprus (STOK).

The teams that were relegated from the Cypriot Fourth Division were taking part to the next season's amateur leagues. The teams that were promoted from the Cypriot Fourth Division were taking part to the next season's Cypriot Third Division.

From 1986–87 season until 2007–08 season, the Fourth Division teams were participating in the Cypriot Cup. From 2008–09 season, the Fourth Division teams were not allowed to participate in the Cypriot Cup, but they could take part in the Cypriot Cup for lower divisions (participation in this cup was not compulsory).

== Structure ==
The structure of the championship changed some times during the years. From 1985–86 until 1992–93, the championship was split into three or four geographical groups, depending from Districts of Cyprus each participated team came from. On some occasions, some teams participated in groups that did not correspond to their geographical origin due to the increased number of teams in the group of their geographical origin. In these cases, the teams which would participate in different geographical groups were determined by a draw. Initially, the championship was played in three regional groups: Nicosia-Keryneia group, Limassol-Paphos group, and Larnaca-Famagusta group. In the 1988–89 season, the championship was played in four regional groups.

The championship was held for the first time as a single division in the 1993–94 season. All the teams played against each other twice, once at their home and once away. The team with the most points at the end of the season crowned champions. This was the league's current format until its last season.

=== Points system ===
The points system of the Cypriot Fourth Division changed during the years:

1. From 1985–86 until 1990–91 season, teams were awarded two points for a win, one point for a draw and zero points for a defeat.
2. From 1991–92 until 2014–15 season, teams were awarded three points for a win, one point for a draw and zero points for a defeat.

== Winners ==
The table presents all the winners of the Cypriot Fourth Division from 1985–86 season to 1987–88 season when the championship was split to three geographical groups.

Season	Nicosia-Keryneia Group	Limassol-Paphos Group	Larnaca-Famagusta Group
1985–86	OXEN Peristeronas	APEY Ypsona	Dynamo Pervolion
1986–87	Libanos Kormakiti	AEZ Zakakiou	Achyronas Liopetriou
1987–88	Iraklis Gerolakkou	ATE PEK Parekklisias	APEAN Ayia Napa

The table presents the winners of the 1988–89 Cypriot Fourth Division when the championship was split to four geographical groups.

Season	Group A	Group B	Group C	Group D
1988–89	AEK Kythreas	APEP Pelendriou	Enosis Neon Ayia Napa	Apollon Lympion

The table presents all the winners of the Cypriot Fourth Division from 1989–90 season to 1992–93 season when the championship was split to three geographical groups.

Season	Nicosia-Keryneia Group	Limassol-Paphos Group	Larnaca-Famagusta Group
1989–90	Olimpiada Neapolis	Tsaggaris Peledriou	APEAN Ayia Napa
1990–91	AEK Kakopetrias	Kentro Neotitas Maroniton	Achyronas Liopetriou
1991–92	OXEN Peristeronas	AEZ Zakakiou	Livadiakos Livadion
1992–93	Ethnikos Latsion	APEY Ypsona	Fotiakos Frenarou

The table presents all the winners of the Cypriot Fourth Division from 1993–94 season to 2014–15 season when the championship was held as a single division.

Season	Winner
1993–94	Elia Lythrodonta
1994–95	AEK Kakopetrias
1995–96	Iraklis Gerolakkou
1996–97	Adonis Idaliou
1997–98	SEK Agiou Athanasiou
1998–99	ENTHOI Lakatamia
1999–00	MEAP Nisou
2000–01	Sourouklis Troullon

Season	Winner
2001–02	AEM Mesogis
2002–03	Orfeas Nicosia
2003–04	Othellos Athienou
2004–05	Frenaros FC 2000
2005–06	Anagennisi Germasogeias
2006–07	Spartakos Kitiou
2007–08	Digenis Oroklinis

Season	Winner
2008–09	Achyronas Liopetriou
2009–10	Enosis Neon Parekklisia
2010–11	Ormideia FC
2011–12	Digenis Oroklinis
2012–13	MEAP Nisou
2013–14	Enosi Neon Ypsona
2014–15	Alki Oroklini

=== Performance By club ===
Club	Winners	Winning seasons
Achyronas Liopetriou	3	1986–87*, 1990–91*, 2008–09
OXEN Peristeronas	2	1985–86*, 1991–92*
APEI Ipsona	2	1985–86*, 1992–93*
AEZ Zakakiou	2	1986–87*, 1991–92*
APEAN Ayia Napa	2	1987–88*, 1989–90*
Iraklis Gerolakkou	2	1987–88*, 1995–96
AEK Kakopetrias	2	1990–91*, 1994–95
MEAP Nisou	2	1999–00, 2012–13
Digenis Oroklinis	2	2007–08, 2011–12
Dynamo Pervolion	1	1985–86*
Libanos Kormakiti	1	1986–87*
ATE PEK Parekklisias	1	1987–88*
AEK Kythreas	1	1988–89*
APEP Pelendriou	1	1988–89*
Apollon Lympion	1	1988–89*
Enosis Neon Ayia Napa	1	1988–89*
Olimpiada Neapolis	1	1989–90*
Tsaggaris Peledriou	1	1989–90*
Kentro Neotitas Maroniton	1	1990–91*

Club	Winners	Winning seasons
Livadiakos Livadion	1	1991–92*
Ethnikos Latsion	1	1992–93*
Fotiakos Frenarou	1	1992–93*
Elia Lythrodonta	1	1993–94
Adonis Idaliou	1	1996–97
SEK Agiou Athanasiou	1	1997–98
ENTHOI Lakatamia	1	1998–99
Sourouklis Troullon	1	2000–01
AEM Mesogis	1	2001–02
Orfeas Nicosia	1	2002–03
Othellos Athienou	1	2003–04
Frenaros FC 2000	1	2004–05
Anagennisi Germasogeias	1	2005–06
Spartakos Kitiou	1	2006–07
Enosis Neon Parekklisia	1	2009–10
Ormideia FC	1	2010–11
Enosi Neon Ypsona	1	2013–14
Alki Oroklini	1	2014–15

* Group Champions

== Number of participating, promoted and relegated teams per season ==
The number of the participated teams and the number of the teams that were promoted to the Cypriot Third Division and the teams that were relegated to the amateur leagues changed many times during the years.

Season	N.	P.	R.
1985–86	43 (3 groups)	3	0
1986–87	46 (3 groups)	3	10
1987–88	42 (3 groups)	2	7
1988–89	42 (4 groups)	2	7
1989–90	41 (3 groups)	2	6
1990–91	43 (3 groups)	3	7
1991–92	42 (3 groups)	3	6
1992–93	40 (3 groups)	3	28

Season	N.	P.	R.
1993–94	14	1	5
1994–95	16	5	0
1995–96	15	3	3
1996–97	14	3	3
1997–98	14	3	3
1998–99	15	3	4
1999–00	14	4	4
2000–01	14	3	3

Season	N.	P.	R.
2001–02	15	3	4
2002–03	13	3	2
2003–04	14	3	3
2004–05	14	3	3
2005–06	14	3	3
2006–07	14	3	3
2007–08	14	3	3

Season	N.	P.	R.
2008–09	14	3	3
2009–10	15	3	4
2010–11	14	3	3
2011–12	15	3	3
2012–13	14	4	2
2013–14	15	2	2
2014–15	14	5	0

== Participations per club ==
130 teams had participated in the Cypriot Fourth Division.

Team	Par.
Ellinismos Akakiou	18
MEAP Nisou	16
AEK Kythreas	15
Ethnikos Latsion	14
Iraklis Gerolakkou	14
Anagennisi Lythrodonta	13
Apollon Lympion	13
Elia Lythrodonta	13
Olympos Xylofagou	13
AOL – Omonia Lakatamias	12
Achyronas Liopetriou	12
Doxa Paliometochou	12
Enosis Kokkinotrimithia	11
Th.O.I. Avgorou	11
Rotsidis Mammari	11
ASIL Lysi	10
ATE PEK Ergaton	10
Dynamo Pervolion	10
Poseidonas Giolou	10
APEP Pelendriou	9
APEY Ypsona	9
ASPIS Pylas	9
Digenis Oroklinis	9
Orfeas Nicosia	9
Spartakos Kitiou	9
ATE PEK Parekklisias	8
Olimpiada Neapolis	8
Olympias Lympion	8
Olympias Frenarou	8
Podosfairikos Omilos Xylotymbou	8
Triptolemus Evrychou	8
Fotiakos Frenarou	8
Adonis Geroskipou	7

Team	Par.
AMEK Kapsalou	7
ENAD Ayiou Dometiou	7
Kimonas Xylotympou	7
Olympos Acheritou	7
Anagennisi Germasogeias	6
Anorthosis Kato Polemidia	6
APEA Akrotiriou	6
APOP Palechoriou	6
Livadiakos Livadion	6
Sourouklis Troullon	6
Frenaros FC 2000	6
AEK Kakopetrias	5
Anagennisi Prosfigon	5
Achilleas Ayiou Theraponta	5
Digenis Agiou Nikolaou	5
Doxa Devtera	5
Doxa Polemidion	5
ENTHOI Lakatamia FC	5
Zenonas Larnaca	5
Konstantios & Evripidis Trachoniou	5
Tsaggaris Peledriou	5
Adonis Idaliou	4
AEM Morphou	4
AMEAN Agiou Nikolaou	4
Anagennisi Trachoni	4
Elpida Astromeriti	4
Elpida Xylofagou	4
Enosis Neon Parekklisia	4
Karmiotissa	4
Kedros Kormakiti	4
Kissos FC Kissonergas	4
Kourio Episkopi	4
Othellos Athienou F.C.	4

Team	Par.
Orfeas Athienou	4
OXEN Peristeronas	4
SEK Agiou Athanasiou	4
AEZ Zakakiou	3
AEK Kornos	3
AMEP Parekklisia	3
APEAN Ayia Napa	3
Achilleas Kaimakli	3
Ethnikos Defteras	3
Elpida Liopetriou	3
Elpida Prosfigon Paphou	3
Kinyras Empas	3
Livadiakos/Salamina Livadion	3
Panikos & Sokratis Zakakiou	3
Panikos Pourgouridis	3
PEFO Olympiakos	3
Proodos Kaimakliou	3
Finikas Ayias Marinas	3
FC Episkopi	2
AEN	2
Alki Oroklini^{1}	2
Amathus Ayiou Tychona	2
Anagennisi Mouttalou	2
ASO Ormideia	2
Digenis Akritas Ipsona	2
EAS Ayios Dhometios	2
ETHA Engomis	2
ENAD Polis Chrysochous	2
ENAN Ayia Napa	2
ENAP Paphos	2
Enosi Neon Ypsona	2
Evagoras Kato Amiandos	2
Evagoras Pallikarides	2

Team	Par.
Kentro Neotitas Kalou Choriou	2
Kentro Neotitas Maroniton	2
Lenas Limassol	2
Libanos Kormakiti	2
Marathonas Kato Varosha	2
Neos Aionas Trikomou	2
Nikos & Sokratis Erimis	2
Kormakitis FC	2
Omonia Ormideia	2
Ormideia FC	2
Parnassos Strovolou	2
Poseidon Larnacas	2
Salamina Dromolaxias	2
AEK Korakou	1
AEK Kouklia	1
AEM Mesogis	1
Atlas Aglandjias	1
Atromitos Yeroskipou	1
Dafni Troulloi	1
Ethnikos Empas	1
Evagoras Avgorou	1
Th.O.I. Filias	1
Thiella Dromolaxia	1
Kedros Ayia Marina	1
Keravnos Strovolou	1
Kissos Kissonerga	1
Kouris Erimis	1
Morfotikos Tymbou	1
PAOK Kalou Choriou	1
Parideio Larnaca	1
Geroskipou FC	1

^{1} The team has one participation as Omonoia Oroklinis and one participation as Alki Oroklini.

== See also ==
- Football in Cyprus
- Cypriot football league system
- Cypriot First Division
- Cypriot Second Division
- Cypriot Third Division
- STOK Elite Division
- Cypriot Cup
- Cypriot Cup for lower divisions
