= Radosław Michalski =

Polish football executive and former footballer

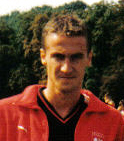

Personal information
- Date of birth: 21 September 1969 (age 57)
- Place of birth: Gdańsk, Poland
- Height: 1.88 m (6 ft 2 in)
- Position: Midfielder

Senior career*
Years	Team	Apps	(Gls)
1988–1992	Stocznowiec Gdańsk		
1992–1996	Legia Warsaw	107	(18)
1996–1999	Widzew Łódź	94	(12)
1999–2001	Maccabi Haifa	38	(3)
2001–2004	Anorthosis Famagusta	69	(11)
2004–2005	Widzew Łódź	33	(3)
2005–2007	Apollon Limassol	27	(0)

International career
1993–2000	Poland	28	(0)
- * Club domestic league appearances and goals

Radosław Michalski (born 21 September 1969) is a Polish former professional footballer who played as a midfielder. He is currently the chairman of the Pomeranian Football Association, as well as a board member of the Polish Football Association.

Before becoming a footballer, he worked alongside Lech Wałęsa at the Gdańsk Shipyard.

As a player, he scored the crucial goal against Brøndby IF which qualified Widzew Łódź for the Champions League group stage in 1996.

After retiring, he was involved in the real estate industry before coming back to football to become the sporting director at Lechia Gdańsk, then the director of the Pomeranian FA, before becoming a board member of the Polish Football Association in 2012.

== Honours ==
Legia Warsaw

- Ekstraklasa: 1993–94, 1994–95
- Polish Cup: 1993–94, 1994–95
- Polish Super Cup: 1994

Widzew Łódź

- Ekstraklasa: 1996–97

Maccabi Haifa

- Israeli Premier League: 2000–01

Anorthosis Famagusta

- Cypriot Cup: 2001–02, 2002–03

Apollon Limassol

- Cypriot First Division: 2005–06

Individual

- Polish Newcomer of the Year: 1993
