= Adonis Geroskipou =

Cypriot football club

Adonis Geroskipou was a Cypriot association football club based in Geroskipou, located in the Paphos District. It had 7 participations in Cypriot Fourth Division during 1985–1992.
