= Hermes Street =

Hermes Street (Greek: Οδός Ερμού, Turkish: Ermu Sokağı) was a major shopping thoroughfare in central Nicosia. It runs from the North end of Ledra Street and into Ektoros Street in the East.

== History ==
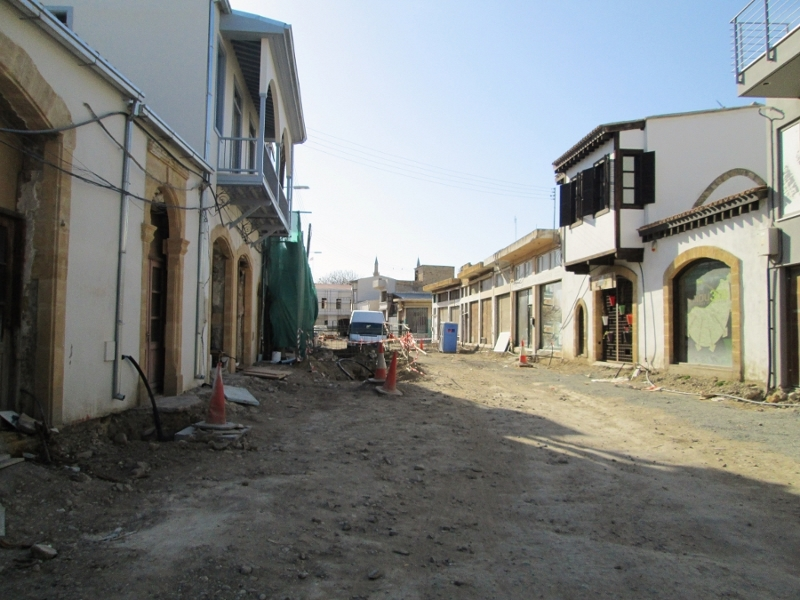
Regeneration project in 2013.

Before Venetian times the River Pedieos course ran through the centre of the town, however this was then diverted when the new walls were built. The old river bed then became an open sewer until the arrival of the British in 1878. They found the city's sanitation to be in an appalling state so they decided the ownership of the land should be given to anyone who could assist in rebuilding the area. Hermes Street was built in 1881 with the help of builders and labourers from the Kaimakli area. They constructed the city's main sewer under the street and built many shops on street level. The authorities gave many of the premises to the builders as a reward for their efforts.

The Street found itself located on the edge of the Greek Quarter of the city from 1958 until 1974.

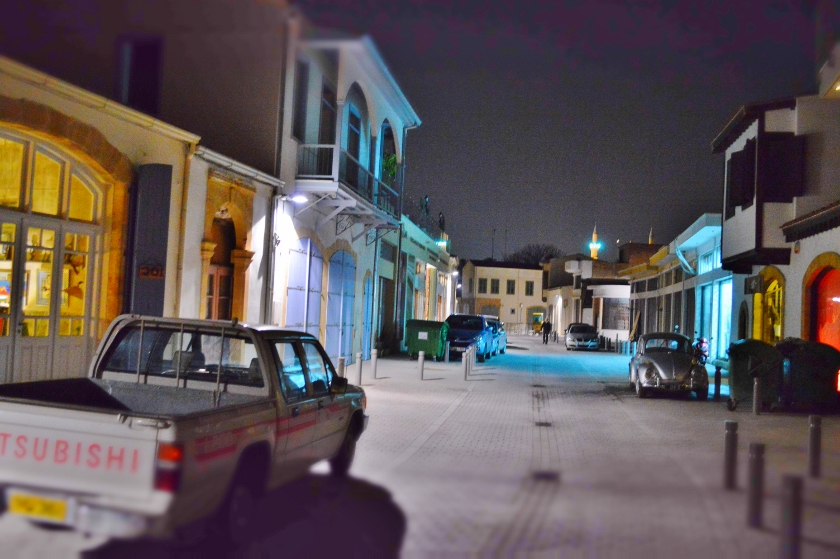
Hermes street by night in November 2014

== Today ==
Hermes street as it enters the UN buffer zone, showing building deterioration

Two thirds of the street is located abandoned within the United Nations Buffer Zone in Cyprus. From the Ledra Street crossing a metal gate blocks access into Hermes Street, however part of the street is still accessible from Manis Street.

== See also ==
- Ledra Street
- Onasagorou Street
- Rigenis Street
