= Marathonas Kato Varosha FC =

Cypriot football club

Marathonas Kato Varosion FC or Marathonas Tsiakkilerou was a Cypriot association football club based in Tsiakkilero, Larnaca. It had 2 participations in Cypriot Fourth Division during 1985–1987.
