= Morfotikos Tymbou =

Cypriot football club

Morfotikos Tymbou (Greek: Μορφωτικός Τύμπου) is a Cypriot association football club based in Tymbou, located in the Nicosia District. It has 1 participation in Cypriot Fourth Division (1992–93 Cypriot Fourth Division).
