= Evagoras Avgorou =

Cypriot football club

- Founded: 1938; 87 years ago

Evagoras Avgorou (Greek: Ευαγόρας Αυγόρου) is a Cypriot association football club based in Avgorou, located in the Famagusta District. It has 1 participation in Cypriot Fourth Division.

Evagoras Avgorou founded in 1938.
