= 1985–86 Cypriot Fourth Division =

Cypriot Fourth Division
- Season: 1985–86
- Champions: OXEN Peristeronas; Dynamo Pervolion; APEI Ipsona (1st title)
- Promoted: OXEN Peristeronas; Dynamo Pervolion; APEI Ipsona

The 1985–86 Cypriot Fourth Division was the first season of the Cypriot fourth-level football league. The championship was split into three geographical groups, representing the Districts of Cyprus. The winners were:

- Nicosia-Keryneia Group: OXEN Peristeronas
- Larnaca-Famagusta Group: Dynamo Pervolion
- Limassol-Paphos Group: APEI Ipsona

The three winners were promoted to the 1986–87 Cypriot Third Division. No team were relegated to regional leagues.

== See also ==
- Cypriot Fourth Division
- 1985–86 Cypriot First Division
- 1985–86 Cypriot Cup
