= Sourouklis Troullon =

Cypriot football club

- Founded: 1972
- Dissolved: 2015
- Ground: Troulloi Community Stadium

Sourouklis Troullon was a Cypriot football club based in Troulloi, Larnaca. The team was playing sometimes in Cypriot Third Division and in Cypriot Fourth Division. In 2015 were merged with Dafni Troulloi to form Troulloi FC 2015.

Season	Championship										Cup	
Season	Division	Place	Teams	Played	Won	Drawn	Lost	Goals		Points	Competition	Round
Season	Division	Place	Teams	Played	Won	Drawn	Lost	For	Against	Points	Competition	Round
2000–01	D	1	14	26	18	2	6	51	20	56	Cypriot Cup	First round
2001–02	C	11	14	26	9	5	12	33	47	32	Cypriot Cup	First round
2002–03	C	6	14	26	11	4	11	33	46	37	Cypriot Cup	First round
2003–04	C	14	14	25	4	2	19	20	81	14	Cypriot Cup	First round
2004–05	D	9	14	26	10	2	14	38	53	32	Cypriot Cup	First round
2005–06	D	8	14	26	9	7	10	32	43	34	Cypriot Cup	First round
2006–07	D	10	14	26	8	8	10	44	44	32	Cypriot Cup	First round
2007–08	D	5	14	26	15	2	9	57	38	39	Cypriot Cup	Second round
2008–09	D	12	14	26	7	6	13	38	53	27	Cypriot Cup for lower divisions	Second round
Βαθμολογία: Νίκη=3 βαθμοί, Ισοπαλία=1 βαθμός, Ήττα=0 βαθμοί
