= APEY Ypsona =

APEY Ypsona was a Cypriot football club based in Ypsonas, Cyprus. They played sometimes in Third and in Fourth Division.

== Honours ==
- Cypriot Fourth Division:
  - Champions (2): 1986 (Limassol-Paphos Group), 1993 (Limassol-Paphos Group)
