= AEK Kakopetrias =

- Founded: 1984

AEK Kakopetrias was a Cypriot football club based in Kakopetria. Founded in 1956, it has playing sometimes in Second, in Third and in Fourth Division.

== Honours ==
- Cypriot Fourth Division:
  - Champions (2): 1990/1991, 1994/1995
