= APEP Pelendriou =

Cypriot football club

- Full name: Athlitiki Podosfairiki Enosi Pelendriou
- Founded: 1956
- Ground: Pelendri Community Stadium
- Website: http://www.apeppelendriou.com/
Home colours	Away colours

APEP Pelendriou (Greek: ΑΠΕΠ Πελενδρίου, Athlitiki Podosfairiki Enosi Pelendriou; "Athletic Football Union Pelendriou") is a Cypriot football club based in Pelendri. Founded in 1956, was playing sometimes in Second and sometimes in the Third and Fourth Division.

== Honours ==
- Cypriot Third Division:
  - Champions (1): 1990
- Cypriot Fourth Division:
  - Champions (1): 1988–89
