= 2002–03 Cypriot First Division =

Cypriot First Division
- Season: 2002–03
- Champions: Omonia (19th title)
- Relegated: Nea Salamina; Aris; Alki
- Champions League: Omonia (2nd qualifying round)
- UEFA Cup: Anorthosis (qualifying round); APOEL (qualifying round; via Cypriot Cup)
- Intertoto Cup: Ethnikos Achna (1st round)
- Matches: 182
- Goals: 628 (3.45 per match)
- Top goalscorer: Marios Neophytou (33 goals)

The 2002–03 Cypriot First Division was the 64th season of the Cypriot top-level football league. Omonia won their 19th title.

== Format ==
Fourteen teams participated in the 2002–03 Cypriot First Division. All teams played against each other twice, once at their home and once away. The team with the most points at the end of the season crowned champions. The last three teams were relegated to the 2003–04 Cypriot Second Division.

The champions ensured their participation in the 2003–04 UEFA Champions League and the runners-up in the 2003–04 UEFA Cup.

The teams had to declare their interest to participate in the 2003 UEFA Intertoto Cup before the end of the championship. At the end of the championship, the higher placed teams among the interested ones participated in the Intertoto Cup (if they had not secured their participation in any other UEFA competition).

=== Point system ===
Teams received three points for a win, one point for a draw and zero points for a loss.

== Changes from previous season ==
Ethnikos Assia, Doxa Katokopias and Ermis Aradippou were relegated from previous season and played in the 2002–03 Cypriot Second Division. They were replaced by the first three teams of the 2001–02 Cypriot Second Division, Nea Salamina, Digenis Morphou and Aris Limassol.

== Stadia and locations ==
2002–03 Cypriot First Division

Team	Stadium
AEK	GSZ Stadium
AEL	Tsirion Stadium
AEP	Pafiako Stadium
Alki	GSZ Stadium
Anorthosis	Antonis Papadopoulos Stadium
APOEL	GSP Stadium
Apollon	Tsirion Stadium
Aris	Tsirion Stadium
Digenis	Makario Stadium
Ethnikos	Dasaki Stadium
ENP	Paralimni Stadium
Nea Salamina	Ammochostos Stadium
Olympiakos	GSP Stadium
Omonia	GSP Stadium

== League standings ==
Pos	Team	Pld	W	D	L	GF	GA	GD	Pts	Qualification or relegation
1	Omonia (C)	26	18	6	2	68	22	+46	60	Qualification for Champions League first qualifying round
2	Anorthosis Famagusta	26	19	2	5	65	30	+35	59	Qualification for UEFA Cup qualifying round (Note: The third team, APOEL, qualified to 2003–04 UEFA Cup because the second team, Anorthosis, already qualified to the same competition as the winner of 2002–03 Cypriot Cup.)
3	APOEL	26	16	7	3	55	24	+31	55	Qualification for UEFA Cup qualifying round
4	Olympiakos Nicosia	26	16	4	6	56	29	+27	52	Qualification for Intertoto Cup first round
5	AEL Limassol	26	11	6	9	56	45	+11	39	
6	Ethnikos Achna	26	10	7	9	35	32	+3	37	Qualification for Intertoto Cup first round
7	AEP Paphos	26	11	4	11	38	45	−7	37	
8	AEK Larnaca	26	9	5	12	43	50	−7	32	
9	Digenis Morphou	26	9	4	13	40	40	0	31	
10	Enosis Neon Paralimni	26	8	7	11	39	40	−1	31	
11	Apollon Limassol	26	8	7	11	42	46	−4	31	
12	Nea Salamina (R)	26	6	11	9	39	40	−1	29	Relegation to Cypriot Second Division
13	Aris Limassol (R)	26	2	3	21	31	92	−61	9	Relegation to Cypriot Second Division
14	Alki Larnaca (R)	26	1	3	22	21	93	−72	6	Relegation to Cypriot Second Division

Rules for classification: 1) Points, 2) Goal differences, 3) Goals for.
(C) Champions; (R) Relegated

== Results ==
Home \ Away	AEK	AEL	AEP	ALK	ANR	APN	APL	ARS	DGN	ETH	ENP	NSL	OLM	OMN
AEK		3–1	2–1	1–0	1–5	0–5	3–0	4–0	4–1	2–0	1–1	4–2	1–1	0–2
AEL	4–2		6–2	7–0	1–2	2–1	2–2	2–1	3–1	2–1	0–0	4–1	1–2	2–3
AEP	1–0	0–0		2–1	4–2	0–2	2–1	4–2	3–1	2–0	0–0	1–3	0–3	2–4
Alki	2–2	1–3	0–1		1–7	1–4	0–1	1–7	2–0	0–0	1–5	2–3	3–4	0–1
Anorthosis	4–1	2–1	2–0	3–2		4–3	4–1	9–2	1–0	2–0	1–2	0–0	2–1	3–1
APOEL	2–1	4–0	2–0	3–0	1–0		0–0	3–1	2–3	1–0	1–1	1–1	1–1	0–0
Apollon	1–0	3–3	2–2	5–0	1–2	0–1		3–1	1–2	3–0	3–2	0–0	2–4	2–3
Aris	2–4	0–4	2–1	2–2	0–4	1–3	1–5		1–4	3–3	2–3	1–4	0–4	0–3
Digenis	1–1	2–2	0–1	8–0	1–2	1–3	0–0	2–0		3–1	1–0	1–1	0–1	1–2
Ethnikos	3–2	2–1	1–0	2–0	2–0	1–1	2–0	2–0	6–1		3–1	0–0	1–4	1–1
ENP	4–1	0–1	4–2	1–0	0–1	2–5	2–2	6–0	1–3	0–3		1–0	0–1	1–1
Nea Salamina	1–1	6–1	1–2	8–1	0–2	1–1	3–1	2–2	0–3	1–1	0–0		0–0	1–2
Olympiakos	2–1	3–2	3–4	2–0	1–1	0–1	2–3	6–0	1–0	2–0	3–2	4–0		0–1
Omonia	4–1	1–1	1–1	11–1	3–0	3–4	5–0	4–0	1–0	0–0	4–0	4–0	3–1	

Legend: Blue = home team win; Yellow = draw; Red = away team win.

== Attendances ==
#	Club	Average
1	Omonoia	10,877
2	APOEL	8,205
3	Anorthosis	4,523
4	Apollon Limassol	3,699
5	AEL	3,204
6	Olympiakos Nicosia	2,761
7	AEP	2,266
8	Nea Salamina	2,131
9	AEK Larnaca	1,950
10	ENP	1,658
11	Alki	1,454
12	Digenis	1,401
13	Aris Limassol	1,374
14	Ethnikos Achnas	1,185

== See also ==
- Cypriot First Division
- 2002–03 Cypriot Cup
- List of top goalscorers in Cypriot First Division by season
- Cypriot football clubs in European competitions

== Sources ==
- "2002/03 Cypriot First Division". Rec.Sport.Soccer Statistics Foundation. 2016-01-14.
- "1. DIVISION 2002/2003". Soccerway.
