= Lythrodontas =

Lythrodontas: Λυθροδόντας (Greek); Litirudondaz (Turkish)
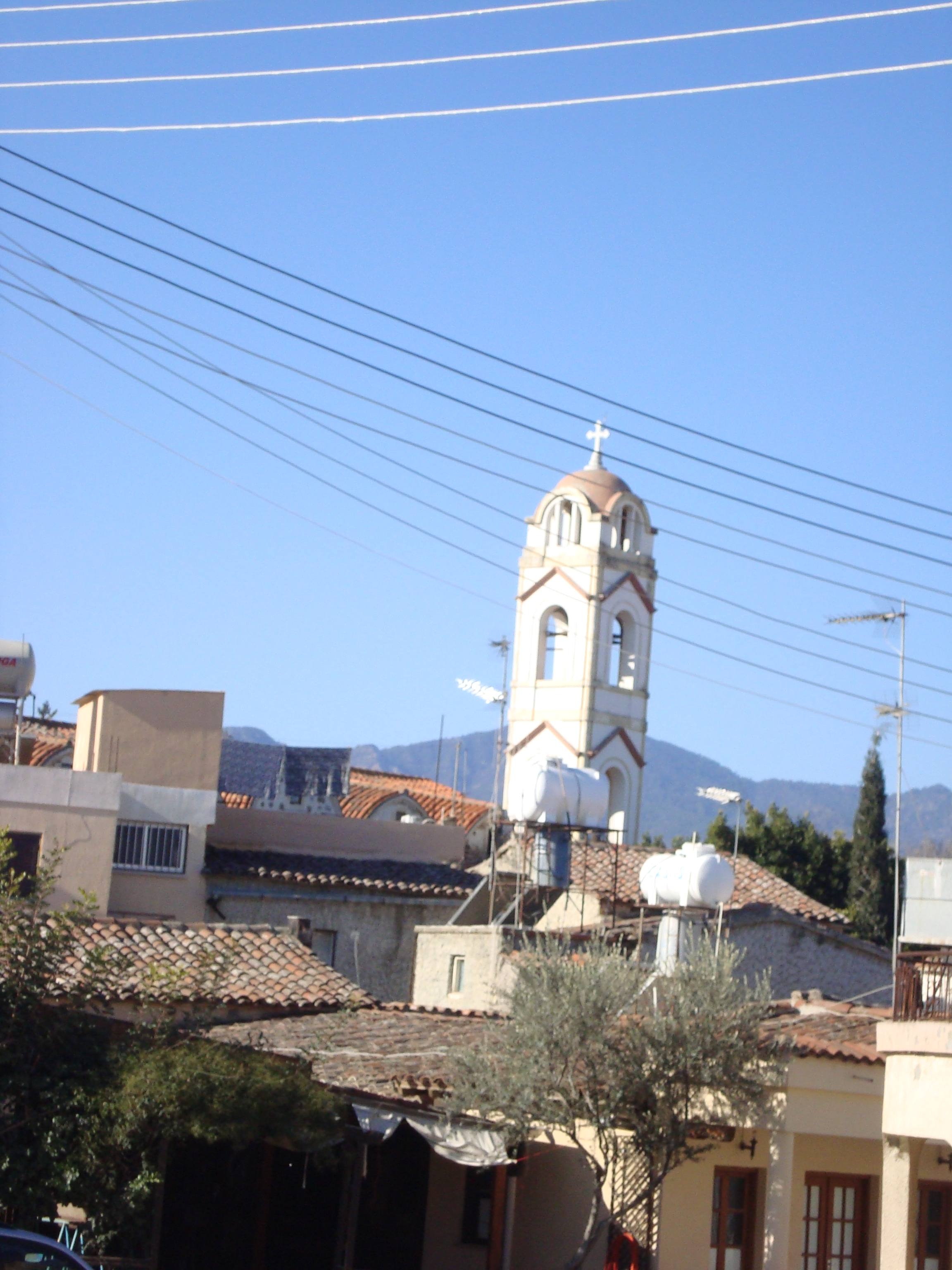

- Location in Cyprus
- Coordinates: 34°56′59″N 33°17′46″E
- Country: Cyprus
- District: Nicosia District

Population (2021)
  - Total: 3,124
- Time zone: UTC+2 (EET)
  - Summer (DST): UTC+3 (EEST)
- Postal code: 2565

Lythrodontas (Greek: Λυθροδόντας; Turkish: Litirudondaz) is a village located in the Nicosia District of Cyprus. It is 31 kilometres outside Nicosia. Lythrodontas is built on the foothill of the mountain region of Machairas and is covered by the green colour of the olive groves.

== Gallery ==
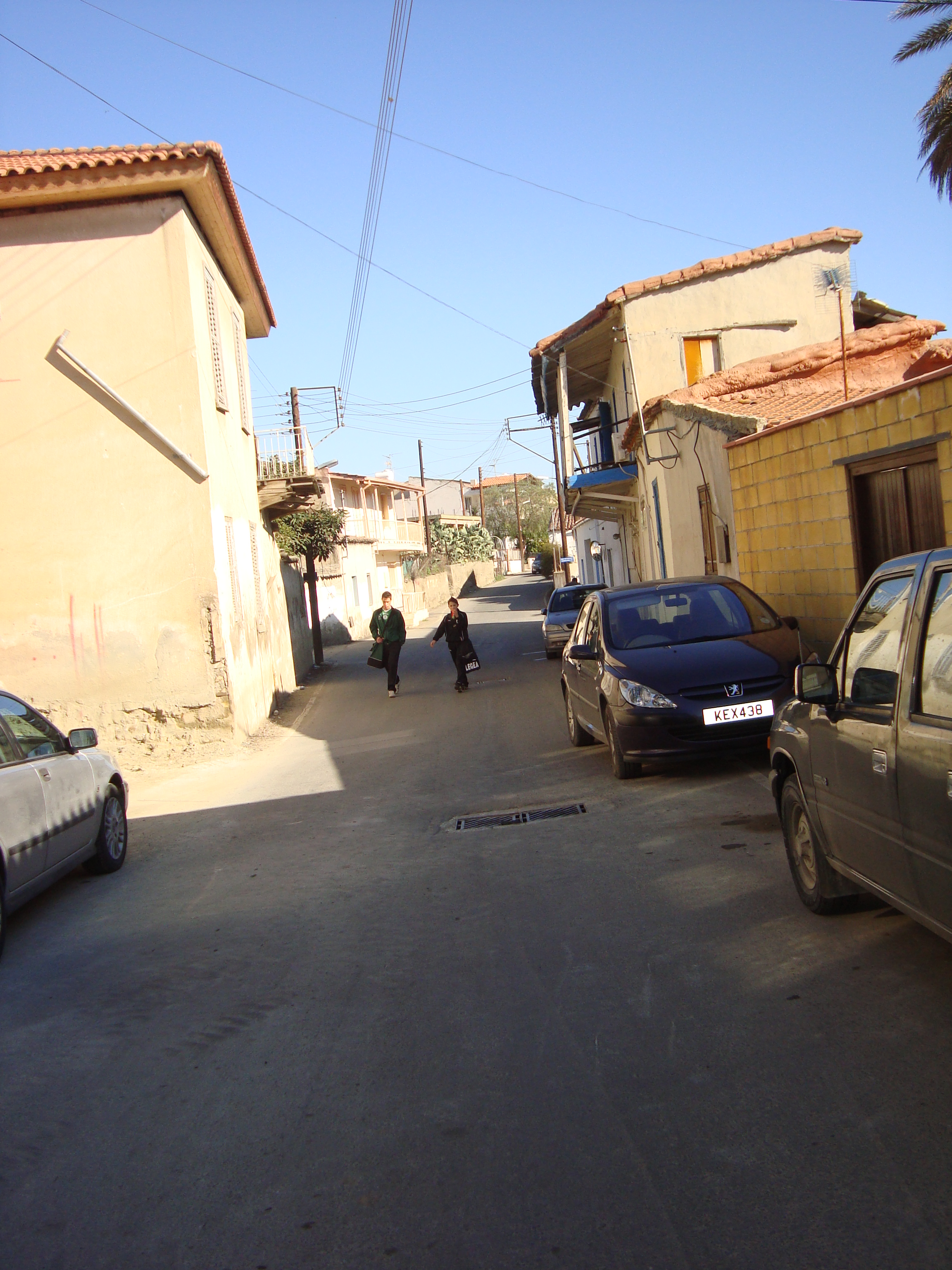
Streets of Lythrodontas village

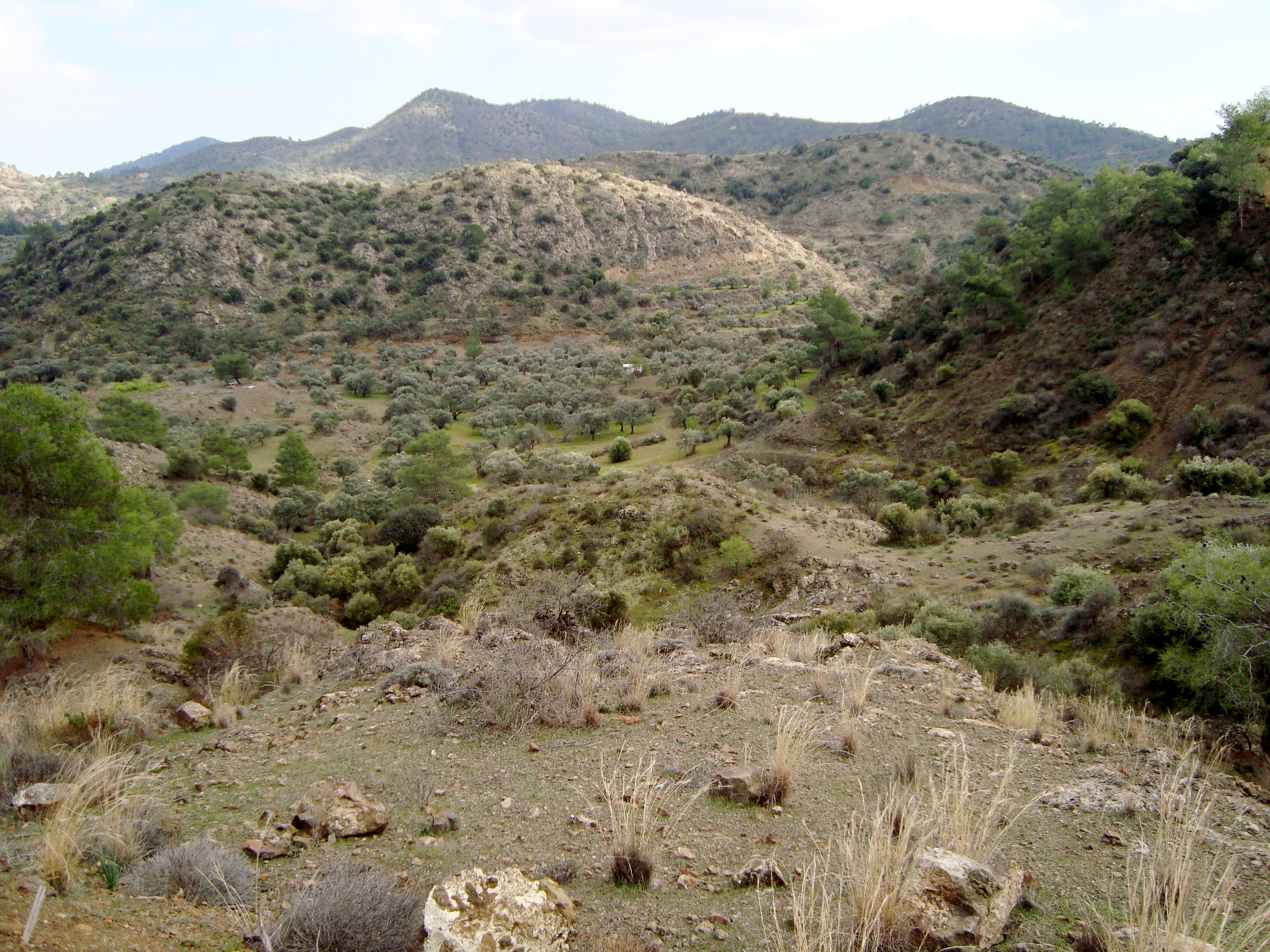
Countryside due north of the village
