= 2001–02 Cypriot First Division =

Cypriot First Division
- Season: 2001–02
- Champions: APOEL (17th title)
- Relegated: Ethnikos Assia; Doxa; Ermis
- Champions League: APOEL (1st qualifying round)
- UEFA Cup: Anorthosis (qualifying round); AEL (qualifying round; via Cypriot Cup)
- Intertoto Cup: Enosis (1st round)
- Matches: 182
- Goals: 669 (3.68 per match)
- Top goalscorer: Wojciech Kowalczyk (22 goals)

The 2001–02 Cypriot First Division was the 63rd season of the Cypriot top-level football league. APOEL won their 17th title.

== Format ==
Fourteen teams participated in the 2001–02 Cypriot First Division. All teams played against each other twice, once at their home and once away. The team with the most points at the end of the season crowned champions. The last three teams were relegated to the 2002–03 Cypriot Second Division.

The champions ensured their participation in the 2002–03 UEFA Champions League and the runners-up in the 2002–03 UEFA Cup.

The teams had to declare their interest to participate in the 2002 UEFA Intertoto Cup before the end of the championship. At the end of the championship, the higher placed team among the interested ones participated in the Intertoto Cup (if they had not secured their participation in any other UEFA competition).

=== Point system ===
Teams received three points for a win, one point for a draw and zero points for a loss.

== Changes from previous season ==
Nea Salamina, Digenis Morphou and Aris Limassol were relegated from previous season and played in the 2001–02 Cypriot Second Division. They were replaced by the first three teams of the 2000–01 Cypriot Second Division, Alki Larnaca, Ethnikos Assia and Ermis Aradippou.

== Stadia and locations ==
2001–02 Cypriot First Division

| Team | Stadium |
|---|---|
| AEK | GSZ Stadium |
| AEL | Tsirion Stadium |
| AEP | Pafiako Stadium |
| Alki | GSZ Stadium |
| Anorthosis | Antonis Papadopoulos Stadium |
| APOEL | GSP Stadium |
| Apollon | Tsirion Stadium |
| Doxa | Peristerona Stadium |
| Ethnikos Assia | Makario Stadium |
| Ethnikos Achna | Dasaki Stadium |
| ENP | Paralimni Stadium |
| Ermis | Aradippou Municipal Stadium |
| Olympiakos | GSP Stadium |
| Omonia | GSP Stadium |

== League standings ==
| Pos | Team | Pld | W | D | L | GF | GA | GD | Pts | Qualification or relegation |
|---|---|---|---|---|---|---|---|---|---|---|
| 1 | APOEL (C) | 26 | 18 | 5 | 3 | 66 | 22 | +44 | 59 | Qualification for Champions League first qualifying round |
| 2 | Anorthosis Famagusta | 26 | 18 | 4 | 4 | 71 | 31 | +40 | 58 | Qualification for UEFA Cup qualifying round (Note: The third team, AEL, qualified to 2002–03 UEFA Cup because the second team, Anorthosis, already qualified to the same competition as the winner of 2001–02 Cypriot Cup.) |
| 3 | AEL Limassol | 26 | 17 | 3 | 6 | 47 | 27 | +20 | 54 | Qualification for UEFA Cup qualifying round |
| 4 | Omonia | 26 | 17 | 2 | 7 | 56 | 35 | +21 | 53 | |
| 5 | Olympiakos Nicosia | 26 | 13 | 3 | 10 | 53 | 45 | +8 | 42 | |
| 6 | Ethnikos Achna | 26 | 13 | 3 | 10 | 46 | 38 | +8 | 42 | |
| 7 | AEK Larnaca | 26 | 13 | 2 | 11 | 56 | 42 | +14 | 41 | |
| 8 | Enosis Neon Paralimni | 26 | 11 | 6 | 9 | 42 | 38 | +4 | 39 | Qualification for Intertoto Cup first round |
| 9 | AEP Paphos | 26 | 11 | 5 | 10 | 54 | 45 | +9 | 38 | |
| 10 | Apollon Limassol | 26 | 10 | 6 | 10 | 56 | 48 | +8 | 36 | |
| 11 | Alki Larnaca (Note: Alki had 3 points deducted for failing to pay old debts to a former manager.) | 26 | 8 | 7 | 11 | 37 | 37 | 0 | 28 | |
| 12 | Ethnikos Assia (R) | 26 | 5 | 2 | 19 | 39 | 70 | −31 | 17 | Relegation to Cypriot Second Division |
| 13 | Doxa Katokopias (R) | 26 | 2 | 3 | 21 | 30 | 84 | −54 | 9 | Relegation to Cypriot Second Division |
| 14 | Ermis Aradippou (R) | 26 | 0 | 1 | 25 | 16 | 107 | −91 | 1 | Relegation to Cypriot Second Division |

Rules for classification: 1) Points, 2) Goal differences, 3) Goals for.
(C) Champions; (R) Relegated

== Results ==
| Home \ Away | AEK | AEL | AEP | ALK | ANR | APN | APL | DXK | EAC | EAS | ENP | ERM | OLM | OMN |
|---|---|---|---|---|---|---|---|---|---|---|---|---|---|---|
| AEK | | 3–4 | 0–1 | 2–1 | 0–1 | 1–1 | 1–3 | 6–1 | 6–3 | 1–2 | 4–3 | 4–0 | 3–4 | 3–0 |
| AEL | 0–1 | | 2–1 | 2–0 | 1–1 | 1–1 | 1–0 | 4–1 | 2–1 | 1–2 | 3–0 | 2–1 | 2–0 | 2–0 |
| AEP | 1–1 | 2–1 | | 2–2 | 2–4 | 1–1 | 3–1 | 6–0 | 6–3 | 1–2 | 4–1 | 4–3 | 3–2 | 0–1 |
| Alki | 0–1 | 1–3 | 1–1 | | 1–0 | 2–2 | 4–1 | 1–1 | 2–0 | 0–1 | 0–2 | 2–0 | 3–2 | 2–3 |
| Anorthosis | 3–2 | 2–2 | 3–2 | 4–1 | | 3–2 | 4–2 | 2–0 | 5–0 | 1–0 | 2–2 | 8–0 | 4–0 | 1–3 |
| APOEL | 4–0 | 2–1 | 3–0 | 2–0 | 1–3 | | 3–1 | 3–0 | 2–0 | 3–1 | 2–0 | 3–0 | 2–0 | 3–0 |
| Apollon | 2–0 | 0–2 | 2–2 | 2–1 | 1–2 | 2–2 | | 2–1 | 4–3 | 2–2 | 2–0 | 8–1 | 3–1 | 2–2 |
| Doxa | 1–2 | 1–2 | 2–6 | 1–2 | 1–3 | 0–3 | 2–2 | | 2–0 | 1–2 | 2–3 | 5–0 | 1–5 | 0–2 |
| Ethnikos Assia | 0–3 | 1–2 | 0–1 | 1–1 | 0–2 | 1–5 | 6–3 | 2–0 | | 3–1 | 1–2 | 7–1 | 0–3 | 0–2 |
| Ethnikos Achna | 1–2 | 0–3 | 3–0 | 0–0 | 2–4 | 1–4 | 0–1 | 6–0 | 3–2 | | 2–1 | 4–1 | 3–1 | 1–2 |
| ENP | 0–2 | 2–1 | 1–0 | 1–1 | 1–1 | 2–3 | 2–1 | 4–0 | 4–1 | 0–0 | | 1–0 | 2–0 | 2–2 |
| Ermis | 1–5 | 0–1 | 1–4 | 0–4 | 1–8 | 0–5 | 0–7 | 2–2 | 1–3 | 0–3 | 0–3 | | 2–4 | 0–3 |
| Olympiakos | 3–2 | 3–0 | 4–1 | 2–0 | 2–0 | 0–3 | 1–1 | 3–2 | 1–1 | 3–2 | 2–2 | 4–1 | | 3–1 |
| Omonia | 2–1 | 1–2 | 1–0 | 1–5 | 2–0 | 2–1 | 2–1 | 11–3 | 6–0 | 1–2 | 2–1 | 3–0 | 1–0 | |

Legend: Blue = home team win; Yellow = draw; Red = away team win.

== Attendances ==
| # | Club | Average |
|---|---|---|
| 1 | APOEL | 7,604 |
| 2 | Omonoia | 7,285 |
| 3 | AEL | 4,465 |
| 4 | Anorthosis | 3,950 |
| 5 | Apollon Limassol | 3,213 |
| 6 | AEP | 2,043 |
| 7 | Olympiakos Nicosia | 1,959 |
| 8 | Alki | 1,464 |
| 9 | Ethnikos Achnas | 1,462 |
| 10 | AEK Larnaca | 1,392 |
| 11 | Ethnikos Assias | 1,188 |
| 12 | ENP | 1,185 |
| 13 | Ermis | 1,074 |
| 14 | Doxa Katokopias | 1,015 |

== See also ==
- Cypriot First Division
- 2001–02 Cypriot Cup
- List of top goalscorers in Cypriot First Division by season
- Cypriot football clubs in European competitions

== Sources ==
- "2001/02 Cypriot First Division". Rec.Sport.Soccer Statistics Foundation. 2016-01-14.
