= Kaimakli =

Kaimakli Καϊμακλί (Greek) (Büyük) Kaymaklı (Turkish)
- Location in Cyprus
- Coordinates: 35°11′21″N 33°23′1″E
- Country: Cyprus
  - District: Nicosia District
  - Municipality: Nicosia

Population (2011)
  - Total: 11,564
- Time zone: UTC+2 (EET)
  - Summer (DST): UTC+3 (EEST)

Kaimakli (Greek: Καϊμακλί [kaimaˈkli]; Turkish: Kaymaklı or Büyük Kaymaklı [ˈbyjyc kajmakˈɫɯ]) is a large northeastern suburb of Nicosia, Cyprus. Since 1968, it belongs to the Municipality of Nicosia. Its population in 2011 was 11,564. The neighbourhood is divided by the green line, with the northern part of the suburb Kuchuk Kaimakli / Omorfita (Greek: Ομορφίτα [omorˈfita]; Turkish: Küçük Kaymaklı [cyˈtʃyc kajmakˈɫɯ]) lying in the north of the green line.

== Etymology ==
Kaimakli derives from the Turkish word "kaymak" which means clotted cream, and by extension, the name of the neighbourhood literally means "with clotted cream". The term also applies to the froth on top of a cup of Turkish coffee. Rupert Gunnis states that the suburb took its name from a farm that produced clotted cream.

The neighbourhood is divided into two different namesake areas alongside the division with the Green Line, with the part of the neighbourhood in the north, being called Küçük Kaymakli, with Küçük meaning small in Turkish, while Büyük Kaymakli, with Beuyuk or Büyük meaning large remains under the administration of the Republic of Cyprus. These qualifiers were used to differentiate Omorfita/Küçük Kaymaklı from a nearby village which was also known as Kaimakli.

== History ==
During the rule of Cyprus by the Lusignans the Venetians and the Genoans, Kaimakli was known by the name Misokelevsi.

The builders of Kaimakli were known for the quality of their work, and the conquest of Cyprus by the Lusignans gave them the opportunity to develop a new technique in construction. They were taught by the latin architects how to build palaces and temples. The worked on the construction of the Agia Sophia Cathedral (today the Selimiye Mosque). They were taught stone carving and acquired special tools for chiseling elaborate carvings whose technique is reminiscent of the architectural decorative elements of North Eastern France of the late 12th Century.

=== The Frankish walls of Nicosia ===
The first walls of Nicosia were built by the Lusignans after their arrival in Cyprus in 1191. These had a somewhat irregular shape. In 1383 the walls were reinforced with stronger ones. They had five gates with drawbridges. The perimeter of the walls was 7.5 km, and was surrounded by a moat that, during raids, was filled by the Pediaios River that was running through the town.

The earth used for the construction of the walls came from the area in Kaimakli called "Chandakas" (Χάνδακας). At the same location, the inhabitants of Kaimakli continued to use the earth, that was of particular good quality, to make the mud bricks (Πλιθαρια) fired in kilns that also produced ceramics for home use: bowls, pots etc.

Kaimakli has two churches, Saint Barbara's and Archangel Michael's, which was also a cemetery. In St. Barbara there are some interesting old icons, e.g. one of Virgin Mary dated back to 1763.

In the 19th and 20th Century the inhabitants of Kaimakli where famed for their building and labouring skills. In 1878 when the British arrived, they found that the Venetians had diverted the river Pediaios north of the city, but the old riverbed still ran through the centre, creating an open sewer and rubbish dump, which sometimes flooded into the surrounding streets. In 1881 the riverbed was covered, the municipality offered ownership of the area covered to labourers prepared to undertake the work. Much of it was done by builders from Kaimakli who thus built Hermes Street. Many of the shops built were then given to builders as a reward for their labour.

The Cyprus Government Railway (Section 1) was constructed in 1905 and the line passed through Kaimakli towards Nicosia . A Station Halt and siding was then built in 1909 at the corner of what is now Synergasias Street and St. Hilarion. This formed part of the old line and the rail tracks are now buried within the tarmac. The Line and station closed on 31 December 1951. The Station was restored in 1995 and a Linear Park was constructed on over a kilometre of the old track.

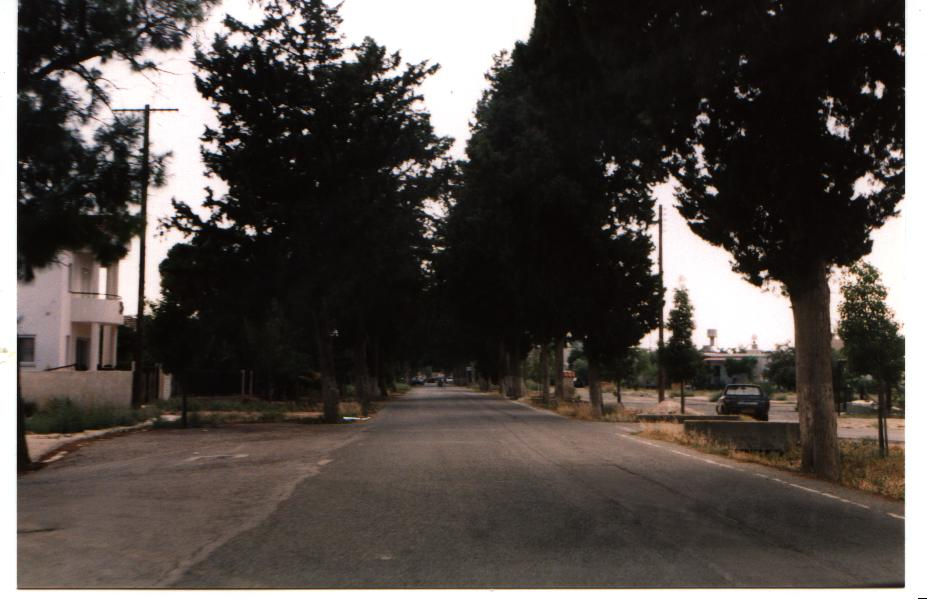
Synergasias Street

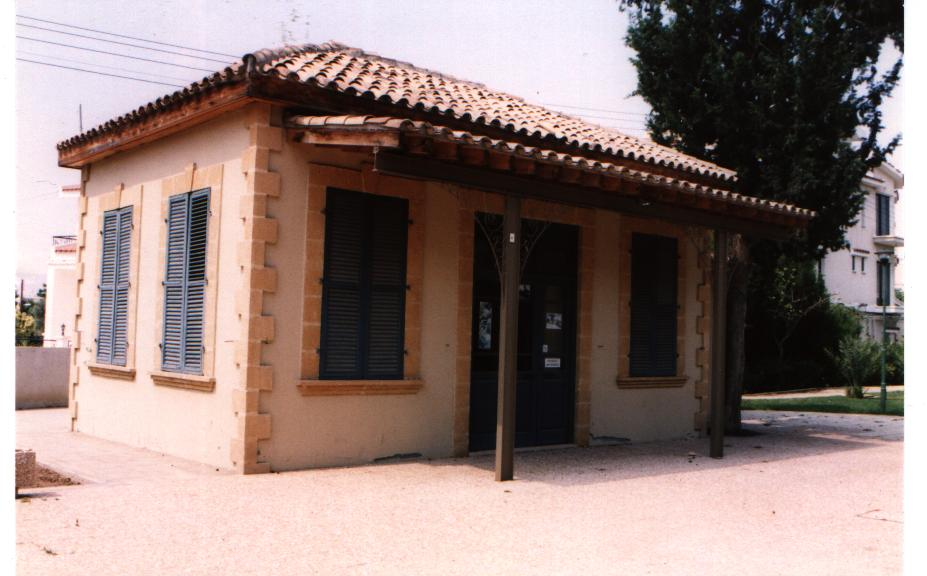
Kaimakli Railway Station

== Industry ==
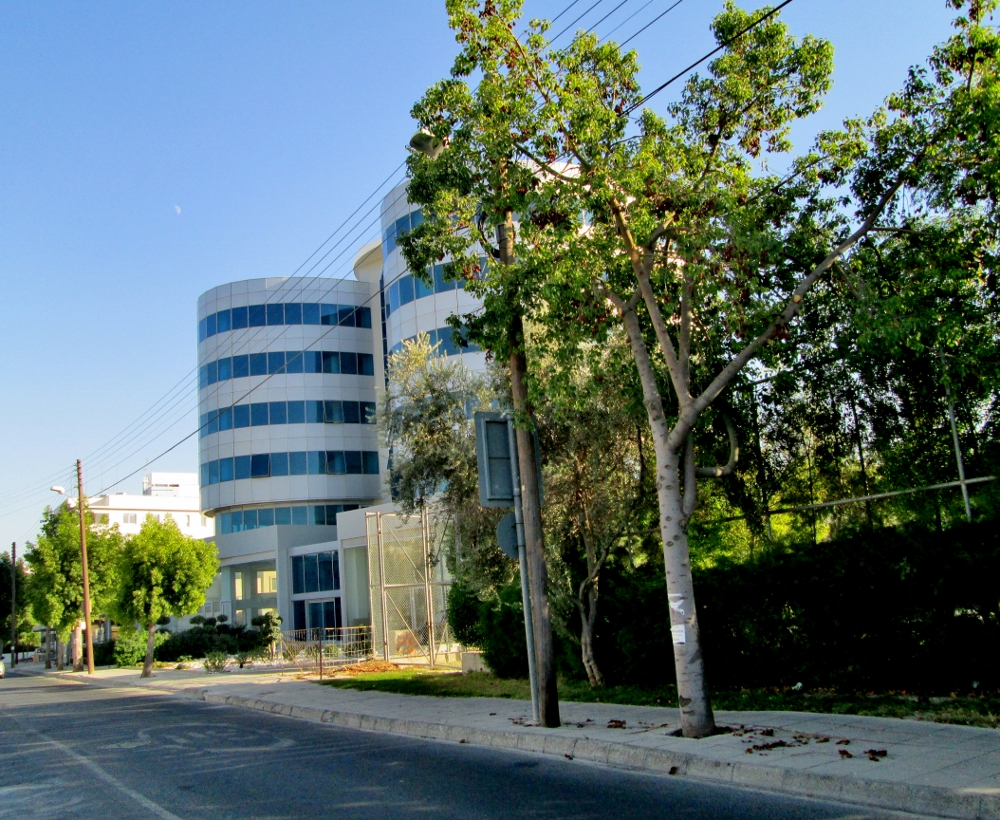
Building in the modern part of Kaimakli

The Regis Milk Industries, a major ice cream producer on the island, has its factory located at 1 Synergasias Street.

== Sport ==
Achilleas is a Cypriot basketball club founded in 1943, nowadays running basketball, volleyball and table tennis divisions. It has been an integral part of the community in the suburb. The club is named after Achilles (Greek: Ἀχιλλεύς) a legendary figure of the Greek mythology. Also, Kaimakli has three football teams: Omonoia Voreiou Polou, Kaimakli and Morfotikos Kaimakli.
