= Olympos Xylofagou =

Cypriot football club

- Full name: Olympos Xylofagou
- Founded: 1952; 73 years ago
- Ground: Michalonikion Stadio
- Capacity: 2,000
- League: EPEL Championship

Olympos Xylofagou is a Cypriot football club from the town of Xylofagou near Larnaca. The club's official name is Sports Club Olympos Xylofagou (Greek: Αθλητικό Σωματείο Όλυμπος Ξυλοφάγου). The club was founded in 1952 and plays in the Cypriot amateur leagues. It played in the professional leagues until the 2009-10 season, when it got relegated from the Cypriot Fourth Division.

== Stadium ==
Currently, the team plays at the 2,000 capacity Makario Stadium Xylophagou.

== League participations ==
- Cypriot Second Division: 2007–08
- Cypriot Third Division: 2008–09
- Cypriot Fourth Division: 2009-10
