= Agioi Trimithias =

Agioi Trimithias: Άγιοι Τριμιθιάς (Greek); Aytrimitya (Turkish)
- Location in Cyprus
- Coordinates: 35°6′53″N 33°12′36″E
- Country: Cyprus
- District: Nicosia District

Population (2011)
  - Total: 1,529
- Time zone: UTC+2 (EET)
  - Summer (DST): UTC+3 (EEST)

Agioi Trimithias (Greek: Άγιοι Τριμιθιάς; Turkish: Aytrimitya) is a village located in the Nicosia District of Cyprus.
