= AEM Mesogis =

Mesogis
- Full name: AEM Mesogis
- League: Cypriot Fourth Division
- 2013–14: ?

AE Mesogis is a Cypriot football team currently playing in the Cypriot Fourth Division. The team is established in Mesogi near Paphos.

The club has played one season in the Cypriot Second Division.

== League participations ==
- Cypriot Second Division: 2006–2007
- Cypriot Third Division: 2007–?
- Cypriot Fourth Division: ?

== Achievements ==
- Cypriot Third Division: 2005–06
- Cypriot Fourth Division: 2001–02
