= SEK Agiou Athanasiou =

Cypriot football club

- Founded: October 1, 1948; 77 years ago
- Ground: SEK Stadium

SEK Agiou Athanasiou is a Cypriot football club based in Ayios Athanasios, Limassol. Founded in 1956, was playing sometimes in Second and sometimes in the Third and Fourth Division.

== Honours ==
- Cypriot Third Division:
  - Champions (2): 2002, 2005
- Cypriot Fourth Division:
  - Champions (1): 1997–98
