= Frenaros FC 2000 =

Cypriot football club

- Full name: Frenaros FC 2000
- Founded: 2000; 25 years ago
- Ground: Frenaros Municipal Stadium; Frenaros, Cyprus
- Capacity: 2,000
- Chairman: Marios Karayiannas
- Manager: Nikos Kolombourdas
- League: Regional League
- 2017–18: STOK Elite Division, 12th (relegated)
Home colours	Away colours

Frenaros FC 2000 (Greek: Φρέναρος FC 2000) is a Cypriot football team from the village Frenaros, Famagusta. It was founded in 2000. This season the team participates in Cypriot Third Division.

== Achievements ==
- Cypriot Fourth Division Winners: 1
  - 2005
