= ThOI Avgorou FC =

Cypriot football club

Th.O.I Avgorou
- Founded: 1954

Th.O.I Avgorou is a Cypriot football club based in Avgorou, Cyprus. Founded in 1960, it played sometimes in Third and in Fourth Division. The club has also a women's volleyball team that takes part in Cyprus Women's Volleyball Division 1.
