= Anagennisi Germasogeias FC =

Cypriot football club

Anagennisis Germasogeias
- Full name: Anagennisis Germasogeias
- Founded: 1956; 70 years ago
- Ground: Yermasoyia Municipal Stadium, Yermasoyia, Lemesos province, Cyprus
- Capacity: 2000
- League: Cypriot Third Division
- 2011–12: 13th (relegated)

Anagennisis Germasoyias is a Cypriot football club based in Yermasoyia, Lemesos province, Cyprus. Anagennisis were founded in 1956. Their colours are blue and white and they play in Yermasoyia Municipal Stadium. Annagennisis is well known for its close relationship with Apollon Limassol, for many considered to be their satellite team.

== Achievements ==
- Cypriot Fourth Division Winners: 1
  - 2006
