= Elia Lythrodonta =

Cypriot football club

- Founded: 1919
- Ground: Stadio Elia Lythrodontas, Lythrodontas
- Capacity: 1500
- Manager: Andreas Piperas
- League: STOK Elite Division
- 2022–23: Third Division, 16th (relegated)

Elia Lythrodonta (Greek: Εληά Λυθροδόντα) is a Cypriot football club which is based in Lythrodontas in Nicosia. The club was founded in 1919 and the football team at 1939. The team was playing sometimes in Cypriot Third Division and in Cypriot Fourth Division. "Elia" means Olive in Greek language.

== Honours ==
- Cypriot Fourth Division: 1

1993–94
