= Adonis Idaliou =

Cypriot football club

- Founded: 1956
- Dissolved: 2015
- Ground: Adonis Idaliou Stadium
Home colours	Away colours

Adonis Idaliou was a Cypriot football club based in Dali. Founded in 1956, was playing sometimes in Second, in Third and in Fourth Division.

== Honours ==
- Cypriot Third Division:
  - Champions (2): 1978, 1984
- Cypriot Fourth Division:
  - Champions (1): 1996–97
- Cypriot Cup for lower divisions:
  - Winner (1): 2013–14
