= Kinyras Empas =

Cypriot football club

- Dissolved: 2003

Kinyras Empas was a Cypriot football club based in Empa. The team was playing sometimes in Second, in Third and in Fourth Division. In 2003 were merged with APOP Peyias to form APOP Kinyras FC.
