= Enosis Kokkinotrimithia =

Cypriot football club

Enosis Kokinotrimithia
- Founded: 1968
- Ground: Kokinotrimithia Community Stadium
- League: 2015-16 STOK Elite Division

Enosis Kokinotrimithia is a Cypriot football club based in Kokinotrimithia. Founded in 1968, was playing sometimes in Second and sometimes in the Third and Fourth Division.
