= Anagennisi Lythrodonta =

Cypriot football club

- Founded: 1944; 81 years ago
- Ground: Anagennisi Lythrodonta Ground

Anagennisi Lythrodonta is a Cypriot association football club based in Lythrodontas, located in the Nicosia District. Its stadium is the Anagennisi Lythrodonta Ground and its colours are red and white. It has 13 participations in Cypriot Fourth Division.
