= Rotsidis Mammari =

Cypriot football club

- Founded: 11 August 1961
- Ground: Rotsidion Stadium
- League: Regional League
- 2018–19: STOK Elite Division, 13th (relegated)
- Website: http://www.rotsides.net/
Home colours	Away colours

Rotsidis Mammari is a Cypriot football club based in Mammari. Founded in 1961, was playing sometimes in Second and sometimes in the Third and Fourth Division.

== Honours ==
- Cypriot Third Division:
  - Champions (1): 1997
