= AEK Kythreas =

Cypriot football club

- Full name: Aθλητικη Ενωση Κυθρεας; Athletic Union of Kythrea
- Founded: 1950; 76 years ago
- Ground: Municipal Stadium of Aglantzia Aglantzia, Nicosia
- Capacity: 1,000
- Chairman: (Cyprus) Zaxarias Vasiliadis
- League: POEL Championship Division 2
- 2018–19: 6
Home colours

AEK Kythreas (Greek: ΑΕΚ; Aθλητική Ένωση Κυθρεας, Athlitiki Enosi Kythreas) is a Cypriot football club, formerly based in Kythrea, a village under de facto control of Northern Cyprus. Since 1974 due to the Turkish invasion in Cyprus and the occupation of Kythrea village, the club is based in Nicosia.

== History ==
Founded in 1950, the team has played in Third and Fourth Divisions of Cyprus. In the decades of 50s and 60s the team was taking part in local football tournaments. The club was one of the founders of the Third Division of Cyprus at the end of the 60s. The club played in the third division from 1970 to 1974. In 1975 the team moved his based in Nicosia. AEK continued to play to the third division until 1987 when the team was relegated in the fourth division. AEK played in fourth division until 2003 except for the seasons 1991–1992, 1993–1994, 1997–1998, and 2000–2001 because it was relegated to local championships. In 2003 AEK finished third in the fourth division championship and returned to third division. After three seasons in third division AEK relegated to fourth division in 2006. The next season (2006–2007) the team was relegated to local championships again. After two years, the team returned to fourth division in season 2009–2010 but once more it was relegated to local championships. AEK returned to fourth division in season 2011–2012, but it was relegated again. At the end of the season the club decided to dissolve the football team due to financial problems. The football team made its return in 2016 and since that year it participates to POEL Championship in Nicosia district.

== Championships and Accomplishments ==
- 1970–71 First participation in a championship host by CFA (Cypriot Third Division)
- 1972–73 2nd position in Cypriot Third Division (Club's highest position in its history)
- 1988–89 Cypriot Fourth Division Champions (Nicosia/Keryneia Region)
- 1992–93 Fair Play Award Winners for the Cypriot Fourth Division
- 1995–96 Fair Play Award Winners for the Cypriot Fourth Division
- 1997–98 POEL Championship Runners Up
- 1997–98 POEL Group Champions (Won undefeated)
- 1997–98 POEL Cup Winners
- 2002–03 3rd position in Cypriot Fourth Division (Promotion to Cypriot Third Division)
- 2010–11 2nd position in POEL Group Championship
