= AEK/Achilleas Ayiou Theraponta =

- Founded: 1997
- Dissolved: 2005

AEK/Achilleas Ayiou Theraponta was a Cypriot football club based in Limassol. The club was formed in 1997 after the merger of the clubs, AEK Katholiki and Achilleas Ayiou Theraponta. The teams were playing sometimes in Second and in Third Division. It dissolved in 2005.
