= Ergates =

Ergates: Eργάτες (Greek); Ergates (Turkish)
- Location in Cyprus
- Coordinates: 35°3′13″N 33°14′34″E
- Country: Cyprus
- District: Nicosia District

Population (2001)5000
  - Total: 1,588
- Time zone: UTC+2 (EET)
  - Summer (DST): UTC+3 (EEST)

Ergates (Greek: Eργάτες; Turkish: Ergates) is a village located in the Nicosia District of Cyprus.
