= 1999–2000 Cypriot Fourth Division =

Cypriot Fourth Division
- Season: 1999–2000
- Champions: MEAP (1st title)
- Promoted: MEAP; Elia; THOI Avg. AMEP
- Relegated: AEK; Orfeas; PAOK
- Matches played: 182
- Goals scored: 574 (3.15 per match)

The 1999–2000 Cypriot Fourth Division was the 15th season of the Cypriot fourth-level football league. MEAP Nisou won their 1st title.

== Format ==
Fourteen teams participated in the 1999–2000 Cypriot Fourth Division. All teams played against each other twice, once at their home and once away. The team with the most points at the end of the season crowned champions. The first three teams were promoted to the 2000–01 Cypriot Third Division and the last three teams were relegated to regional leagues.

However, in the summer, after the end of the championship, Evagoras Paphos merged with APOP Paphos to form AEP Paphos (AEP took the place of APOP in the 2000–01 Cypriot First Division. Because of this, playoffs between the bottom three teams of the 1999–2000 Cypriot Second Division and the fourth team of the 1999–2000 Cypriot Third Division were held for the extra place in the 2000–01 Cypriot Second Division. Also, playoffs between the bottom three teams of the 1999–2000 Cypriot Third Division and the fourth team of the 1999–2000 Cypriot Fourth Division were held for the extra place in the 2000–01 Cypriot Third Division.

=== Point system ===
Teams received three points for a win, one point for a draw and zero points for a loss.

== Changes from previous season ==
Teams promoted to 1999–2000 Cypriot Third Division

- THOI Lakatamia
- Kinyras Empas
- Ellinismos Akakiou

Teams relegated from 1998–99 Cypriot Third Division

- APEP Pelendriou
- ATE PEK Ergaton
- Elia Lythrodonta

Teams promoted from regional leagues

- PAOK Kalou Choriou
- Elpida Xylofagou
- PEFO Olympiakos

Teams relegated to regional leagues

- Anagennisi Prosfigon Lemesou
- AOL Omonia Lakatamias
- Poseidonas Giolou
- Evagoras Kato Amiantos

== League standings ==
Pos	Team	Pld	W	D	L	GF	GA	GD	Pts	Promotion or relegation
1	MEAP Nisou (C, P)	26	18	3	5	52	30	+22	57	Promoted to Cypriot Third Division
2	Elia Lythrodonta (P)	26	13	5	8	53	36	+17	44	Promoted to Cypriot Third Division
3	THOI Avgorou (P)	26	12	7	7	48	42	+6	43	Promoted to Cypriot Third Division
4	AMEP Parekklisia (P)	26	12	6	8	42	34	+8	42	Qualification for promotion play-offs
5	Apollon Lympion	26	12	5	9	40	36	+4	41	
6	AEK Kakopetrias	26	11	5	10	39	36	+3	38	
7	ATE PEK Ergaton	26	9	10	7	49	40	+9	37	
8	APEP Pelendriou	26	11	3	12	34	38	−4	36	
9	AMEK Kapsalou	26	10	4	12	42	44	−2	34	
10	Elpida Xylofagou	26	10	3	13	30	37	−7	33	
11	PEFO Olympiakos	26	9	4	13	39	40	−1	31	
12	AEK Kythreas (R)	26	8	7	11	35	37	−2	31	Relegated to regional leagues
13	Orfeas Nicosia (R)	26	8	4	14	33	44	−11	28	Relegated to regional leagues
14	PAOK Kalou Choriou (R)	26	5	2	19	38	80	−42	17	Relegated to regional leagues

Rules for classification: 1) Points, 2) Goal differences, 3) Goals for.
(C) Champions; (P) Promoted; (R) Relegated

== Results ==
Home \ Away	AKP	AKT	AMK	AMP	APP	APL	ATP	ELL	ELP	THA	MPN	ORF	PKK	PEF
AEK Kak.		2–0	5–1	5–1	1–1	2–1	1–1	2–1	1–0	0–1	3–1	1–0	3–2	1–0
AEK Kyt.	4–0		2–3	0–0	1–2	3–1	1–0	0–2	1–1	1–1	0–1	0–1	4–1	2–1
AMEK	2–0	1–1		1–0	2–2	0–2	1–2	0–2	2–1	4–0	0–1	2–3	4–1	1–1
AMEP	2–2	1–1	3–4		0–1	2–0	2–1	3–1	2–1	3–1	4–0	4–2	4–0	0–0
APEP	3–0	2–0	0–1	3–1		2–1	0–1	2–0	4–2	3–0	0–2	0–2	3–0	1–3
Apollon	1–0	1–2	2–0	1–0	2–0		4–1	1–0	0–0	1–1	1–1	4–0	2–1	1–1
ATE PEK	3–2	2–2	0–0	3–0	2–0	5–0		1–1	3–1	2–4	1–1	4–1	2–2	2–1
Elia	2–1	2–2	3–1	2–3	3–2	6–0	2–2		3–0	1–1	1–0	4–1	4–1	4–0
Elpida	1–0	0–1	2–1	1–1	3–0	2–4	2–1	1–0		3–0	2–1	1–0	3–1	1–0
THOI	3–0	3–1	2–0	1–1	5–0	1–1	2–2	2–2	2–1		0–2	4–3	6–1	2–1
MEAP	2–1	4–2	3–4	2–1	1–0	1–0	4–4	5–0	2–0	4–1		2–1	4–2	2–0
Orfeas	1–1	1–0	2–0	0–1	0–0	1–5	2–2	3–1	4–0	3–1	1–2		0–1	1–1
PAOK	2–2	1–3	2–6	0–1	5–2	2–3	2–1	1–2	2–1	2–3	0–2	1–0		4–11
PEFO	0–3	3–1	2–1	1–2	0–1	2–1	2–1	1–4	1–0	0–1	1–2	2–0	4–1	

Legend: Blue = home team win; Yellow = draw; Red = away team win.

== See also ==
- Cypriot Fourth Division
- 1999–2000 Cypriot First Division
- 1999–2000 Cypriot Cup

== Sources ==
- "1999/2000 Cypriot Fourth Division". Rec.Sport.Soccer Statistics Foundation. 2016-01-14.
