= 1998–99 Cypriot Fourth Division =

Cypriot Fourth Division
- Season: 1998–99
- Champions: THOI Lak. (1st title)
- Promoted: THOI Lak. Kinyras; Ellinismos
- Relegated: Anagennisi Pr. AOL Omonia; Poseidonas; Evagoras
- Matches played: 210
- Goals scored: 613 (2.92 per match)

The 1998–99 Cypriot Fourth Division was the 14th season of the Cypriot fourth-level football league. THOI Lakatamia won their 1st title.

== Format ==
Fourteen teams participated in the 1998–99 Cypriot Fourth Division. All teams played against each other twice, once at their home and once away. The team with the most points at the end of the season crowned champions. The first three teams were promoted to the 1999–2000 Cypriot Third Division and the last four teams were relegated to regional leagues.

=== Point system ===
Teams received three points for a win, one point for a draw and zero points for a loss.

== Changes from previous season ==
Teams promoted to 1998–99 Cypriot Third Division

- SEK Agiou Athanasiou
- ATE PEK Ergaton
- Doxa Paliometochou

Teams relegated from 1997–98 Cypriot Third Division

- AEK Kakopetrias
- Kinyras Empas
- THOI Lakatamia

Teams promoted from regional leagues

- AOL Omonia Lakatamias
- AEK Kythreas
- AMEP Parekklisia
- MEAP Nisou

Teams relegated to regional leagues

- Anorthosis Kato Polemidia
- Salamina Dromolaxias
- Fotiakos Frenarou

== League standings ==
Pos	Team	Pld	W	D	L	GF	GA	GD	Pts	Promotion or relegation
1	THOI Lakatamia (C, P)	28	17	5	6	54	24	+30	56	Promoted to Cypriot Third Division
2	Kinyras Empas (P)	28	16	7	5	40	22	+18	55	Promoted to Cypriot Third Division
3	Ellinismos Akakiou (P)	28	14	7	7	48	21	+27	49	Promoted to Cypriot Third Division
4	MEAP Nisou	28	13	6	9	44	35	+9	45	
5	Th.O.I. Avgorou FC	28	13	6	9	44	37	+7	45	
6	AEK Kythreas	28	13	6	9	37	38	−1	45	
7	AMEP Parekklisia	28	13	3	12	44	36	+8	42	
8	AEK Kakopetrias	28	12	5	11	40	41	−1	41	
9	AMEK Kapsalou	28	11	7	10	44	34	+10	40	
10	Apollon Lympion	28	10	7	11	47	41	+6	37	
11	Orfeas Nicosia	28	9	6	13	44	47	−3	33	
12	Anagennisi Prosfigon (R)	28	8	7	13	30	43	−13	31	Relegated to regional leagues
13	AOL Omonia (R)	28	8	6	14	36	43	−7	30	Relegated to regional leagues
14	Poseidonas Giolou (R)	28	5	4	19	31	60	−29	19	Relegated to regional leagues
15	Evagoras Kato Amiantos (R)	28	4	6	18	30	91	−61	18	Relegated to regional leagues

Rules for classification: 1) Points, 2) Goal differences, 3) Goals for.
(C) Champions; (P) Promoted; (R) Relegated

== Results ==
Home \ Away	AKK	AKT	AMK	AMP	ANG	AOL	APL	ELN	EGR	THA	THL	KNR	MPN	ORF	PSD
AEK Kak.		4–0	1–1	2–5	4–0	3–1	1–0	0–1	1–1	2–1	0–3	1–2	3–1	1–1	2–0
AEK Kyt.	2–0		1–0	1–0	2–3	0–2	0–0	0–0	4–0	2–1	2–1	2–1	1–0	1–1	4–0
AMEK	2–1	2–1		2–1	0–1	1–1	3–1	2–1	6–0	2–1	1–1	0–0	1–2	0–1	3–1
AMEP	1–2	2–0	1–0		2–0	0–1	2–1	4–0	3–2	0–0	1–0	2–2	0–1	2–1	1–0
Anagennisi	3–2	1–1	0–0	0–2		0–0	1–2	2–1	1–0	4–1	0–1	0–2	1–1	5–1	2–1
AOL Omonia	1–2	1–2	2–1	1–2	4–0		1–2	0–2	6–0	1–2	0–0	2–0	2–3	1–1	2–1
Apollon	3–0	1–1	3–1	1–1	1–1	0–2		0–3	6–2	1–0	0–1	1–0	4–0	1–3	4–0
Ellinismos	5–0	7–0	0–1	3–0	0–0	4–1	1–1		3–0	1–1	1–1	0–1	3–0	4–1	1–0
Evagoras	2–2	2–3	0–11	1–0	1–1	1–1	1–9	0–1		2–0	0–1	2–2	2–2	1–3	3–1
THOI Avg.	3–1	2–1	0–0	3–1	1–0	2–1	3–0	2–0	2–0		0–0	1–1	1–1	3–2	4–2
THOI Lak.	0–1	5–2	7–0	4–2	2–1	4–0	1–1	2–0	5–1	3–1		1–2	1–3	5–3	2–0
Kinyras	1–0	0–0	1–0	1–0	2–1	1–0	4–1	1–1	4–1	1–4	2–0		1–1	1–0	0–1
MEAP	0–2	1–2	2–0	3–2	3–0	1–1	2–0	0–1	4–0	4–1	0–1	0–1		2–2	1–0
Orfeas	0–1	0–2	1–1	4–1	2–1	5–0	5–2	0–3	2–3	2–1	0–1	0–1	1–2		1–0
Poseidonas	1–1	1–0	2–3	0–6	4–1	3–1	1–1	1–1	7–2	2–3	0–1	0–5	1–4	1–1	

Legend: Blue = home team win; Yellow = draw; Red = away team win.

== See also ==
- Cypriot Fourth Division
- 1998–99 Cypriot First Division
- 1998–99 Cypriot Cup

== Sources ==
- "1998/99 Cypriot Fourth Division". Rec.Sport.Soccer Statistics Foundation. 2016-01-14.
