= 1997–98 Cypriot Fourth Division =

Cypriot Fourth Division
- Season: 1997–98
- Champions: SEK (1st title)
- Promoted: SEK; ATE PEK; Doxa
- Relegated: Anorthosi P. Salamina Dr. Fotiakos
- Matches played: 182
- Goals scored: 634 (3.48 per match)

The 1997–98 Cypriot Fourth Division was the 13th season of the Cypriot fourth-level football league. SEK won their 1st title.

== Format ==
Fourteen teams participated in the 1997–98 Cypriot Fourth Division. All teams played against each other twice, once at their home and once away. The team with the most points at the end of the season crowned champions. The first three teams were promoted to the 1998–99 Cypriot Third Division and the last three teams were relegated to regional leagues.

=== Point system ===
Teams received three points for a win, one point for a draw and zero points for a loss.

== Changes from previous season ==
Teams promoted to 1997–98 Cypriot Third Division

- Adonis Idaliou
- Achilleas Ayiou Theraponta
- Enosis Kokkinotrimithia

Teams relegated from 1996–97 Cypriot Third Division

- Orfeas Nicosia
- AEK Katholiki^{1}
- Tsaggaris Peledriou^{2}

^{1}AEK Katholiki merged with Achilleas Ayiou Theraponta to form AEK/Achilleas Ayiou Theraponta; participated to 1997–98 Cypriot Third Division.
^{2}Tsaggaris Peledriou withdrew before the start of the 1996–97 Cypriot Third Division; did not participate to 1997–98 Cypriot Fourth Division.

Teams promoted from regional leagues

- ATE PEK Ergaton
- Anagennisi Prosfigon Lemesou
- Evagoras Kato Amiandos
- Anorthosi Polemidion
- Salamina Dromolaxias

Teams relegated to regional leagues

- Digenis Oroklinis
- Digenis Akritas Ypsona
- AEK Kythreas

== League standings ==
Pos	Team	Pld	W	D	L	GF	GA	GD	Pts	Promotion or relegation
1	SEK Agiou Athanasiou (C, P)	26	18	4	4	70	25	+45	58	Promoted to Cypriot Third Division
2	ATE PEK Ergaton (P)	26	18	3	5	80	33	+47	57	Promoted to Cypriot Third Division
3	Doxa Paliometochou (P)	26	16	5	5	53	23	+30	53	Promoted to Cypriot Third Division
4	Poseidonas Giolou	26	16	2	8	52	35	+17	50	
5	AMEK Kapsalou	26	15	1	10	44	35	+9	46	
6	MEAP Pera Choriou Nisou	26	10	6	10	46	41	+5	36	
7	Ellinismos Akakiou	26	10	3	13	47	46	+1	33	
8	Evagoras Kato Amiandos	26	9	5	12	34	46	−12	32	
9	Apollon Lympion	26	9	4	13	40	46	−6	31	
10	Anagennisi Prosfigon Lemesou	26	8	7	11	41	49	−8	31	
11	Orfeas Nicosia	26	8	6	12	40	38	+2	30	
12	Anorthosi Polemidion (R)	26	8	5	13	34	49	−15	29	Relegated to regional leagues
13	Salamina Dromolaxias (R)	26	5	2	19	33	80	−47	17	Relegated to regional leagues
14	Fotiakos Frenarou (R)	26	3	5	18	20	88	−68	14	Relegated to regional leagues

Rules for classification: 1) Points, 2) Goal differences, 3) Goals for.
(C) Champions; (P) Promoted; (R) Relegated

== Results ==
Home \ Away	AMK	ANG	ANR	APL	ATP	DXP	ELN	EGR	MPN	ORF	PSD	SLD	SEK	FTK
AMEK		2–1	1–5	4–3	2–1	1–1	1–0	1–0	3–1	0–1	0–1	3–2	0–2	6–0
Anagennisi	1–0		0–1	3–1	1–4	1–1	3–2	1–0	2–2	1–0	3–3	5–1	2–3	2–2
Anorthosi	0–1	1–1		1–2	1–2	0–1	2–0	2–1	0–2	1–0	2–2	5–0	0–5	5–1
Apollon	2–4	3–0	3–0		3–4	1–4	3–4	2–0	0–0	1–1	0–4	4–2	0–1	1–0
ATE PEK	2–1	4–0	6–0	3–1		3–1	1–2	3–0	6–2	1–1	4–1	3–1	3–1	4–2
Doxa	2–0	2–0	4–0	2–1	1–0		1–0	2–0	2–1	3–1	3–0	6–0	2–1	7–0
Ellinismos	3–0	2–0	1–2	1–1	5–2	2–2		5–0	2–1	1–2	0–1	2–2	1–5	4–0
Evagoras	1–4	1–0	4–1	0–2	2–2	1–0	2–0		3–1	3–3	2–0	5–1	1–1	1–0
MEAP	1–0	6–0	1–1	3–0	1–2	2–2	1–0	5–0		0–1	4–1	3–2	1–3	1–1
Orfeas	3–0	1–1	2–2	1–2	1–2	0–1	1–2	2–2	1–2		2–1	6–1	1–2	5–0
Poseidonas	1–3	3–4	2–0	1–0	1–0	2–0	4–1	2–0	1–0	2–0		4–1	1–0	4–0
Salamina	0–1	1–1	3–0	3–2	0–10	2–1	3–0	2–5	1–2	1–2	1–2		1–5	0–1
SEK	0–3	2–1	3–1	0–0	2–2	1–1	6–2	4–0	5–1	3–0	3–1	2–0		7–0
Fotiakos	1–3	1–7	1–1	0–2	0–6	3–1	0–5	0–0	2–2	3–2	2–7	0–2	0–3	

Legend: Blue = home team win; Yellow = draw; Red = away team win.

== See also ==
- Cypriot Fourth Division
- 1997–98 Cypriot First Division
- 1997–98 Cypriot Cup

== Sources ==
- "1997/98 Cypriot Fourth Division". Rec.Sport.Soccer Statistics Foundation. 2016-01-14.
