= 1999–2000 Cypriot Third Division =

Cypriot Third Division
- Season: 1999–2000
- Champions: THOI (2nd title)
- Promoted: THOI; Rotsidis; Kinyras
- Relegated: Achyronas; Ellinismos; Doxa Pal.
- Matches played: 182
- Goals scored: 587 (3.23 per match)

The 1999–2000 Cypriot Third Division was the 29th season of the Cypriot third-level football league. THOI Lakatamia won their 2nd title.

== Format ==
Fourteen teams participated in the 1999–2000 Cypriot Third Division. All teams played against each other twice, once at their home and once away. The team with the most points at the end of the season crowned champions. The first three teams were promoted to the 1999–2000 Cypriot Second Division and the last three teams were relegated to the 1999–2000 Cypriot Fourth Division.

However, in the summer, after the end of the championship, Evagoras Paphos merged with APOP Paphos to form AEP Paphos (AEP took the place of APOP in the 2000–01 Cypriot First Division. Because of this, playoffs between the bottom three teams of the 1999–2000 Cypriot Second Division and the fourth team of the 1999–2000 Cypriot Third Division were held for the extra place in the 2000–01 Cypriot Second Division. Also, playoffs between the bottom 3 teams of the 1999–2000 Cypriot Third Division and the fourth team of the 1999–2000 Cypriot Fourth Division were held for the extra place in the 2000–01 Cypriot Third Division.

=== Point system ===
Teams received three points for a win, one point for a draw and zero points for a loss.

== Changes from previous season ==
Teams promoted to 1999–2000 Cypriot Second Division

- Chalkanoras Idaliou
- Iraklis Gerolakkou
- APEP Pitsilia

Teams relegated from 1998–99 Cypriot Second Division

- Rotsidis Mammari
- ASIL Lysi
- Akritas Chlorakas

Teams promoted from 1998–99 Cypriot Fourth Division

- ENTHOI Lakatamia
- Kinyras Empas
- Ellinismos Akakiou

Teams relegated to 1999–2000 Cypriot Fourth Division

- APEP Pelendriou
- ATE PEK Ergaton
- Elia Lythrodonta

== League standings ==
Pos	Team	Pld	W	D	L	GF	GA	GD	Pts	Promotion or qualification
1	THOI Lakatamia (C, P)	26	16	4	6	48	24	+24	52	Promoted to Cypriot Second Division
2	Rotsidis Mammari (P)	26	14	6	6	47	26	+21	48	Promoted to Cypriot Second Division
3	Kinyras Empas (P)	26	14	5	7	50	29	+21	47	Promoted to Cypriot Second Division
4	ASIL Lysi	26	12	10	4	45	29	+16	46	Qualification for promotion play-offs
5	Enosis Kokkinotrimithia	26	14	4	8	45	31	+14	46	
6	SEK Agiou Athanasiou	26	11	6	9	46	39	+7	39	
7	Ayia Napa	26	12	2	12	42	47	−5	38	
8	Othellos Athienou	26	10	6	10	48	42	+6	36	
9	Ethnikos Latsion FC	26	10	5	11	40	39	+1	35	
10	Akritas Chlorakas	26	10	3	13	50	50	0	33	
11	Adonis Idaliou	26	8	7	11	42	52	−10	31	
12	Achyronas Liopetriou (R)	26	7	6	13	28	48	−20	27	Qualification for relegation play-offs
13	Ellinismos Akakiou (R)	26	5	5	16	30	54	−24	20	Qualification for relegation play-offs
14	Doxa Paliometochou (Note: Doxa Paliometochou 6 points deducted.) (R)	26	3	3	20	26	77	−51	6	Qualification for relegation play-offs

Rules for classification: 1) Points, 2) Goal differences, 3) Goals for.
(C) Champions; (P) Promoted; (R) Relegated

== Results ==
Home \ Away	ANP	ADN	AKR	ASL	ACR	DOX	ETL	ELN	ENK	THL	KIN	OTL	RTS	SEK
Ayia Napa		3–0	1–0	0–3	3–1	1–0	2–1	2–2	3–0	6–1	3–2	4–2	1–0	0–2
Adonis	1–3		2–4	1–1	4–2	6–1	2–1	2–6	3–2	2–3	2–2	0–1	2–2	1–1
Akritas	4–2	2–3		6–2	2–1	9–0	3–1	4–1	2–0	0–1	0–2	3–5	2–1	3–1
ASIL	3–1	1–0	2–2		5–0	2–0	0–0	1–0	2–1	2–2	1–1	2–1	3–0	2–2
Achyronas	0–0	4–1	2–0	0–1		3–2	2–0 (Note: The match Ahironas Liopetriou-Ethnikos Latsion was awarded to Ahironas Liopetriou with a score of 2–0 following an appeal by the club because Ethnikos Latsion fielded an ineligible player. The original score of the match was 1–1.)	3–1	0–0	0–0	1–0	0–0	1–2	2–1
Doxa	2–4	1–2	6–2	1–4	4–1		2–3	0–1	0–3	0–2	1–0	1–1	0–1	1–3
Ethnikos	5–0	1–1	3–0	2–2	2–0	4–1		2–1	2–1	1–0	0–2	1–0	3–0	1–2
Ellinismos	2–1	0–1	0–0	2–0	2–2	1–1	3–3		1–4	1–2	1–2	2–1	1–5	1–2
Enosis	3–1	1–0	3–0	1–0	2–0	2–2	1–1	3–0		1–0	2–0	3–0	3–2	1–1
THOI	2–0	4–0	2–0	0–0	3–0	1–0	3–0	3–0	3–0		2–0	3–0	2–2	2–3
Kinyras	2–0	1–0	1–0	1–1	6–0	7–0	2–0	3–1	4–1	3–2		5–3	1–2	1–0
Othellos	4–0	3–3	2–1	1–1	2–2	5–0	3–1	4–0	2–0	0–2	4–0		0–3	1–1
Rotsidis	2–0	0–0	1–1	2–0	3–1	6–0	3–0	2–0	0–1	3–2	1–1	2–0		1–0
SEK	3–1	2–3	5–0	2–4	2–0	3–0	3–2	1–0	2–6	0–1	1–1	2–3	1–1	

Legend: Blue = home team win; Yellow = draw; Red = away team win.

== Relegation playoff ==
Standings

Pos	Team	Pld	W	D	L	GF	GA	GD	Pts	Qualification or relegation
1	AMEP Parekklisia (P)	6	4	1	1	18	8	+10	13	Promoted to Cypriot Third Division
2	Doxa Paliometochou (R)	6	2	1	3	13	15	−2	7	Relegated to Cypriot Fourth Division
3	Ellinismos Akakiou (R)	6	2	1	3	9	17	−8	7	Relegated to Cypriot Fourth Division
4	Achyronas Liopetriou (R)	6	1	3	2	11	11	0	6	Relegated to Cypriot Fourth Division

Rules for classification: 1) Points, 2) Goal differences, 3) Goals for.
(P) Promoted; (R) Relegated

Results

Home \ Away	AMP	ACH	DXP	ELN
AMEP		3–3	6–2	4–0
Achyronas	1–2		4–2	2–2
Doxa	0–2	0–0		4–1
Ellinismos	2–1	2–1	2–5	

Legend: Blue = home team win; Yellow = draw; Red = away team win.

== See also ==
- Cypriot Third Division
- 1999–2000 Cypriot First Division
- 1999–2000 Cypriot Cup

== Sources ==
- "1999/2000 Cypriot Third Division". Rec.Sport.Soccer Statistics Foundation. 2016-01-14.
