= 2000–01 Cypriot Third Division =

Cypriot Third Division
- Season: 2000–01
- Champions: ASIL (1st title)
- Promoted: ASIL; Adonis; Enosis Kok.
- Relegated: Ethnikos L. AMEP; THOI Avgorou
- Matches played: 182
- Goals scored: 560 (3.08 per match)

The 2000–01 Cypriot Third Division was the 30th season of the Cypriot third-level football league. ASIL Lysi won their 1st title.

== Format ==
Fourteen teams participated in the 2000–01 Cypriot Third Division. All teams played against each other twice, once at their home and once away. The team with the most points at the end of the season crowned champions. The first three teams were promoted to the 2001–02 Cypriot Second Division and the last three teams were relegated to the 2001–02 Cypriot Fourth Division.

=== Point system ===
Teams received three points for a win, one point for a draw and zero points for a loss.

== Changes from previous season ==
Teams promoted to 2000–01 Cypriot Second Division

- THOI Lakatamia
- Rotsidis Mammari
- Kinyras Empas

Teams relegated from 1999–2000 Cypriot Second Division

- PAEEK FC
- Iraklis Gerolakkou

Teams promoted from 1999–2000 Cypriot Fourth Division

- MEAP Nisou
- Elia Lythrodonta
- THOI Avgorou
- AMEP Parekklisia

Teams relegated to 2000–01 Cypriot Fourth Division

- Achyronas Liopetriou
- Ellinismos Akakiou
- Doxa Paliometochou

== League standings ==
Pos	Team	Pld	W	D	L	GF	GA	GD	Pts	Promotion or relegation
1	ASIL Lysi (C, P)	26	15	5	6	47	19	+28	50	Promoted to Cypriot Second Division
2	Adonis Idaliou (P)	26	15	5	6	45	27	+18	50	Promoted to Cypriot Second Division
3	Enosis Kokkinotrimithia (P)	26	13	4	9	46	40	+6	43	Promoted to Cypriot Second Division
4	Othellos Athienou	26	13	4	9	33	34	−1	43	
5	MEAP Nisou	26	11	6	9	51	44	+7	39	
6	Iraklis Gerolakkou	26	10	8	8	40	35	+5	38	
7	Akritas Chlorakas	26	11	5	10	45	50	−5	38	
8	PAEEK FC	26	10	5	11	39	42	−3	35	
9	Elia Lythrodonta	26	10	5	11	30	38	−8	35	
10	SEK Agiou Athanasiou	26	9	6	11	46	47	−1	33	
11	Ayia Napa	26	10	3	13	35	37	−2	33	
12	Ethnikos Latsion FC (R)	26	8	4	14	40	38	+2	28	Relegated to Cypriot Fourth Division
13	AMEP Parekklisia (R)	26	7	6	13	34	49	−15	27	Relegated to Cypriot Fourth Division
14	THOI Avgorou (R)	26	5	4	17	29	60	−31	19	Relegated to Cypriot Fourth Division

Rules for classification: 1) Points, 2) Goal differences, 3) Goals for.
(C) Champions; (P) Promoted; (R) Relegated

== Results ==
Home \ Away	ADN	ANP	AMP	AKR	ASL	ETL	ELL	ENK	IRK	TAG	MPN	OTL	PKK	SEK
Adonis		1–0	1–0	2–1	0–0	2–0	1–0	4–4	0–1	4–1	4–0	2–0	5–2	4–1
Ayia Napa	0–0		1–2	1–0	0–3	2–1	4–0	4–3	1–2	1–0	0–1	4–1	1–0	2–3
AMEP	1–2	2–1		1–1	0–2	3–2	1–1	0–0	1–3	1–0	4–4	4–2	0–1	1–1
Akritas	3–2	3–2	5–3		1–0	0–0	0–0	4–1	2–1	3–2	5–1	1–0	1–3	1–1
ASIL	4–1	1–1	1–0	6–0		1–1	3–0	1–0	4–1	1–1	3–1	4–0	3–1	3–1
Ethnikos	4–2	4–0	2–3	3–1	0–1		1–1	2–3	2–0	5–1	2–0	0–1	2–1	4–0
Elia	2–0	1–0	1–2	2–3	0–3	3–1		2–0	1–1	1–0	2–1	2–3	2–0	3–2
Enosis	0–1	1–2	0–0	3–1	1–0	2–1	3–0		1–2	2–0	3–2	0–2	4–2	3–1
Iraklis	0–0	1–2	3–0	5–0	2–0	1–0	0–2	1–3		3–1	2–1	0–1	1–1	6–6
Th.O.I.	1–1	1–0	4–0	2–7	0–3	2–1	0–1	2–2	0–0		3–1	1–2	2–3	2–5
MEAP	0–3	2–2	3–2	1–0	3–0	2–0	1–1	4–0	2–2	7–0		0–0	1–0	2–0
Othellos	1–0	0–2	2–1	4–1	2–0	2–0	3–0	1–4	1–1	2–0	1–1		0–2	1–1
PAEEK FC	1–2	2–1	2–1	0–0	0–0	2–2	2–0	1–2	3–1	4–1	2–6	3–0		0–3
SEK	0–1	2–1	4–1	4–1	2–0	2–0	3–2	0–1	0–0	0–2	3–4	0–1	1–1	

Legend: Blue = home team win; Yellow = draw; Red = away team win.

== See also ==
- Cypriot Third Division
- 2000–01 Cypriot First Division
- 2000–01 Cypriot Cup

== Sources ==
- "2000/01 Cypriot Third Division". Rec.Sport.Soccer Statistics Foundation. 2016-01-14.
