= 1998–99 Cypriot Cup =

Tournament details
- Country: Cyprus
- Dates: 14 November 1998 – 8 May 1999
- Teams: 50

Final positions
- Champions: APOEL (17th title)

The 1998–99 Cypriot Cup was the 57th edition of the Cypriot Cup. A total of 50 clubs entered the competition. It began on 14 November 1998 with the preliminary round and concluded on 8 May 1999 with the final that was held at Tsirion Stadium. APOEL won their 17th Cypriot Cup trophy after beating Anorthosis 2–0 in the final.

== Format ==
In the 1998–99 Cypriot Cup, participated all the teams of the Cypriot First Division, the Cypriot Second Division, the Cypriot Third Division and 8 of the 15 teams of the Cypriot Fourth Division.

The competition consisted of six knock-out rounds. In the preliminary round and in the first round each tie was played as a single leg and was held at the home ground of one of the two teams, according to the draw results. Each tie winner was qualifying to the next round. If a match was drawn, extra time was following. If extra time was drawn, there was a replay at the ground of the team who were away for the first game. If the rematch was also drawn, then extra time was following and if the match remained drawn after extra time the winner was decided by penalty shoot-out.

The next three rounds were played in a two-legged format, each team playing a home and an away match against their opponent. The team which scored more goals on aggregate, was qualifying to the next round. If the two teams scored the same number of goals on aggregate, then the team which scored more goals away from home was advancing to the next round.

If both teams had scored the same number of home and away goals, then extra time was following after the end of the second leg match. If during the extra thirty minutes both teams had managed to score, but they had scored the same number of goals, then the team who scored the away goals was advancing to the next round (i.e. the team which was playing away). If there weren't scored any goals during extra time, the qualifying team was determined by penalty shoot-out.

The cup winner secured a place in the 1999–2000 UEFA Cup.

== Ρreliminary round ==
All the 14 clubs of the Cypriot Second Division, all the 14 clubs of the Cypriot Third Division and 8 clubs from the Cypriot Fourth Division (first eight of the league table the day of draw) participated in the preliminary round.

Team 1	Score	Team 2
Ayia Napa F.C. (C)	3–1	Chalkanoras Idaliou (C)
Achyronas Liopetriou (C)	1–2	Omonia Aradippou (B)
Adonis Idaliou (C)	2–3	Elia Lythrodonta (C)
AEK/Achilleas Ayiou Theraponta (B)	2–3	Ethnikos Assia F.C. (B)
Akritas Chlorakas (B)	4–2	Rotsidis Mammari (B)
Anagennisi Germasogeias (B)	0–1	AEZ Zakakiou (B)
APEP Pelendriou (C)	2–1	Iraklis Gerolakkou (C)
APEP F.C. (C)	1–1, 0–6	Anagennisi Deryneia (B)
Apollon Lympion (D)	3–1	SEK Agiou Athanasiou (C)
ATE PEK Ergaton (C)	2–1	ASIL Lysi (B)
Digenis Akritas Morphou (B)	0–0, 1–3	APOP Paphos (B)
Doxa Paliometochou (C)	2–1	Ellinismos Akakiou (D)
ENTHOI Lakatamia FC (D)	2–1	Othellos Athienou F.C. (C)
Enosis Kokkinotrimithia (C)	1–1, 0–1	AEK Kakopetrias (D)
Ermis Aradippou (B)	0–0, 2–2 (4–5 p)	PAEEK FC (B)
Ethnikos Latsion (C)	1–3	Th.O.I. Avgorou FC (D)
Kinyras Empas (D)	1–3	AEK Kythreas (D)
Onisilos Sotira (B)	3–1	Anagennisi Prosfigon Lemesou (D)

== First round ==
The 14 clubs of the Cypriot First Division advanced directly to the first round and met the winners of the preliminary round ties:

Team 1	Score	Team 2
AEK Kakopetrias (D)	1–5	APOEL FC (A)
AEL Limassol (A)	7–1	Akritas Chlorakas (B)
AEZ Zakakiou (B)	0–3	Enosis Neon Paralimni FC (A)
Anagennisi Deryneia (B)	1–3 (a.e.t.)	Apollon Lympion (D)
Anorthosis Famagusta FC (A)	10–0	ENTHOI Lakatamia FC (D)
Apollon Limassol (A)	9–0	Elia Lythrodonta (C)
APOP Paphos (B)	1–2	Olympiakos Nicosia (A)
Aris Limassol F.C. (A)	3–0	AEK Kythreas (D)
Doxa Katokopias F.C. (A)	2–0	ATE PEK Ergaton (C)
Ethnikos Achna FC (A)	5–0	Doxa Paliometochou (C)
Ethnikos Assia F.C. (B)	3–5	Evagoras Paphos (A)
Nea Salamis Famagusta FC (A)	6–0	Onisilos Sotira (B)
Omonia Aradippou (B)	0–6	AEK Larnaca F.C. (A)
AC Omonia (A)	8–0	APEP Pelendriou (C)
PAEEK FC (B)	0–2	Alki Larnaca F.C. (A)
Th.O.I. Avgorou FC (D)	2–0	Ayia Napa F.C. (C)

== Second round ==
Team 1	Agg.	Team 2	1st leg	2nd leg
AEL Limassol (A)	4–4 (a)	Ethnikos Achna FC (A)	4–2	0–2
Alki Larnaca F.C. (A)	2–9	AEK Larnaca F.C. (A)	0–4	2–5
Anorthosis Famagusta FC (A)	3–1	Apollon Limassol (A)	1–1	2–1
APOEL FC (A)	3–2	Doxa Katokopias F.C. (A)	1–0	2–2
Aris Limassol F.C. (A)	4–7	Evagoras Paphos (A)	2–3	2–4
Enosis Neon Paralimni FC (A)	11–0	Apollon Lympion (D)	9–0	2–0
Nea Salamis Famagusta FC (A)	13–0	Th.O.I. Avgorou FC (D)	9–0	4–0
AC Omonia (A)	6–1	Olympiakos Nicosia (A)	4–0	2–1

== Quarter-finals ==
Team 1	Agg.	Team 2	1st leg	2nd leg
AEK Larnaca F.C. (A)	5–7	Nea Salamis Famagusta FC (A)	4–3	1–4
APOEL FC (A)	5–2	AC Omonia (A)	2–2	3–0
Ethnikos Achna FC (A)	1–0	Enosis Neon Paralimni FC (A)	1–0	0–0
Evagoras Paphos (A)	3–5	Anorthosis Famagusta FC (A)	0–3	3–2

== Semi-finals ==
Team 1	Agg.	Team 2	1st leg	2nd leg
Anorthosis Famagusta FC (A)	5–3	Ethnikos Achna FC (A)	2–2	3–1
Nea Salamis Famagusta FC (A)	3–7	APOEL FC (A)	2–3	1–4

== Final ==
8 May 1999

APOEL	2–0	Anorthosis
Marcelo 75', 85' (pen.)

Tsirion Stadium, Limassol
Attendance: 16,000
Referee: Yiannakis Kyprianides

Cypriot Cup 1998–99 Winners
APOEL
17th title

== Sources ==
- "1998/99 Cyprus Cup". Rec.Sport.Soccer Statistics Foundation. 2016-01-14.

== See also ==
- Cypriot Cup
- 1998–99 Cypriot First Division
