= 2000–01 Cypriot Cup =

Tournament details
- Country: Cyprus
- Dates: 11 November 2000 – 12 May 2001
- Teams: 50

Final positions
- Champions: Apollon (5th title)

The 2000–01 Cypriot Cup was the 59th edition of the Cypriot Cup. A total of 50 clubs entered the competition. It began on 11 November 2000 with the preliminary round and concluded on 12 May 2001 with the final which was held at GSP Stadium. Apollon Limassol won their 5th Cypriot Cup trophy after beating Nea Salamina 1–0 in the final.

== Format ==
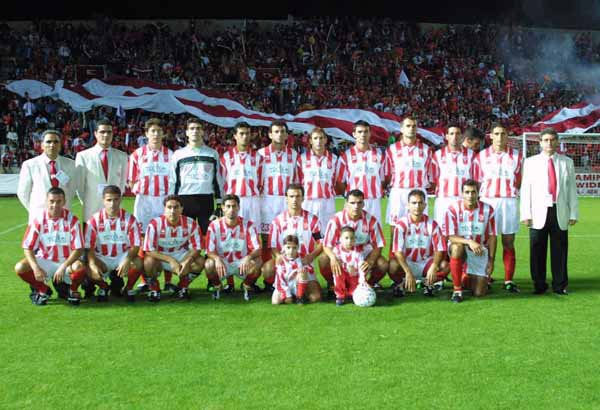
Nea Salamis Famagusta FC at 2000–01 Cypriot Cup Final at GSP Stadium. At the background the fans of the team.

In the 2000–01 Cypriot Cup, participated all the teams of the Cypriot First Division, the Cypriot Second Division, the Cypriot Third Division and 8 of the 14 teams of the Cypriot Fourth Division.

The competition consisted of six knock-out rounds. In the preliminary round and in the first round each tie was played as a single leg and was held at the home ground of one of the two teams, according to the draw results. Each tie winner was qualifying to the next round. If a match was drawn, extra time was following. If extra time was drawn, there was a replay at the ground of the team who were away for the first game. If the rematch was also drawn, then extra time was following and if the match remained drawn after extra time the winner was decided by penalty shoot-out.

The next three rounds were played in a two-legged format, each team playing a home and an away match against their opponent. The team which scored more goals on aggregate, was qualifying to the next round. If the two teams scored the same number of goals on aggregate, then the team which scored more goals away from home was advancing to the next round.

If both teams had scored the same number of home and away goals, then extra time was following after the end of the second leg match. If during the extra thirty minutes both teams had managed to score, but they had scored the same number of goals, then the team who scored the away goals was advancing to the next round (i.e. the team which was playing away). If there weren't scored any goals during extra time, the qualifying team was determined by penalty shoot-out.

The cup winner secured a place in the 2001–02 UEFA Cup.

== Ρreliminary round ==
All the 14 clubs of the Cypriot Second Division, all the 14 clubs of the Cypriot Third Division and 8 clubs from the Cypriot Fourth Division (first eight of the league table the day of draw) participated in the preliminary round.

Team 1	Score	Team 2
Ayia Napa F.C. (C)	3–1	Achyronas Liopetriou (D)
Adonis Idaliou (C)	2–0	PEFO Olympiakos (D)
AEK/Achilleas Ayiou Theraponta (B)	0–3	Ermis Aradippou (B)
Alki Larnaca F.C. (B)	2–1	ASIL Lysi (C)
AMEK Kapsalou (D)	2–1	APEP F.C. (B)
Anagennisi Deryneia (B)	5–0	APEP Pelendriou (D)
ENTHOI Lakatamia FC (B)	2–3	Anagennisi Germasogeias (B)
Elia Lythrodonta (C)	1–4	Chalkanoras Idaliou (B)
Ellinismos Akakiou (D)	0–3	MEAP Nisou (C)
Elpida Xylofagou (D)	3–1	Anagennisi Prosfigon Lemesou (D)
Enosis Kokkinotrimithia (C)	2–0	Omonia Aradippou (B)
Ethnikos Assia F.C. (B)	1–0	Onisilos Sotira (B)
Iraklis Gerolakkou (C)	3–3 (a.e.t.), 0–2	AMEP Parekklisia (C)
Kinyras Empas (B)	2–0	SEK Agiou Athanasiou (C)
Othellos Athienou F.C. (C)	1–0 (a.e.t.)	Ethnikos Latsion (C)
PAEEK FC (C)	0–1	AEZ Zakakiou (B)
Rotsidis Mammari (B)	1–2	Akritas Chlorakas (C)
Sourouklis Troullon (D)	4–1	Th.O.I Avgorou (C)

== First round ==
The 14 clubs of the Cypriot First Division advanced directly to the first round and met the winners of the preliminary round ties:

Team 1	Score	Team 2
Ayia Napa F.C. (C)	0–2	Olympiakos Nicosia (A)
Adonis Idaliou (C)	4–6	AC Omonia (A)
AEZ Zakakiou (B)	0–1	AEK Larnaca F.C. (A)
Akritas Chlorakas (C)	0–4	Enosis Neon Paralimni FC (A)
Alki Larnaca F.C. (B)	1–2	Apollon Limassol (A)
AMEK Kapsalou (D)	0–4	AEL Limassol (A)
Ethnikos Assia F.C. (B)	2–3	APOEL FC (A)
Anagennisi Germasogeias (B)	0–7	Anorthosis Famagusta FC (A)
Anagennisi Deryneia (B)	1–2	Nea Salamis Famagusta FC (A)
Elpida Xylofagou (D)	1–5	AEP Paphos F.C. (A)
Ermis Aradippou (B)	2–1	Doxa Katokopias F.C. (A)
Kinyras Empas (B)	1–2 (a.e.t.)	Ethnikos Achna FC (A)
Enosis Kokkinotrimithia (C)	2–5	Aris Limassol F.C. (A)
Othellos Athienou F.C. (C)	3–0	AMEP Parekklisia (C)
Sourouklis Troullon (D)	0–4	Digenis Akritas Morphou (A)
Chalkanoras Idaliou (B)	3–0	MEAP Nisou (C)

== Second round ==
Team 1	Agg.	Team 2	1st leg	2nd leg
AEK Larnaca F.C. (A)	4–1	Anorthosis Famagusta FC (A)	0–1	4–0
Aris Limassol F.C. (A)	1–6	AC Omonia (A)	0–2	1–4
Ethnikos Achna FC (A)	0–5	AEL Limassol (A)	0–3	0–2
Digenis Akritas Morphou (A)	1–3	Olympiakos Nicosia (A)	1–1	0–2
Ermis Aradippou (B)	4–6	Nea Salamis Famagusta FC (A)	3–1	1–5
Othellos Athienou F.C. (C)	1–5	Chalkanoras Idaliou (B)	0–3	1–2
Enosis Neon Paralimni FC (A)	1–7	APOEL FC (A)	1–0	0–7
AEP Paphos F.C. (A)	4–6	Apollon Limassol (A)	2–1	2–5

== Quarter-finals ==
Team 1	Agg.	Team 2	1st leg	2nd leg
APOEL FC (A)	6–4	Olympiakos Nicosia (A)	2–0	4–4
Apollon Limassol (A)	5–2	AEL Limassol (A)	4–2	1–0
Nea Salamis Famagusta FC (A)	1–0	AEK Larnaca F.C. (A)	0–0	1–0
Chalkanoras Idaliou (B)	1–8	AC Omonia (A)	0–2	1–6

== Semi-finals ==
Team 1	Agg.	Team 2	1st leg	2nd leg
APOEL FC (A)	1–1 (a)	Nea Salamis Famagusta FC (A)	1–1	0–0
AC Omonia (A)	3–3 (3–4 p)	Apollon Limassol (A)	2–1	1–2

== Final ==
12 May 2001

Apollon	1–0	Nea Salamina
Zubarev 66'

GSP Stadium, Nicosia
Attendance: 14,828
Referee: Panikos Kailis

Cypriot Cup 2000–01 Winners
Apollon Limassol
5th title

== Sources ==
- "2000/01 Cyprus Cup". Rec.Sport.Soccer Statistics Foundation. 2016-01-14.
- Gavreilides, Michalis; Papamoiseos, Stelios (2001). Ένας αιώνας Κυπριακό ποδόσφαιρο [One century Cypriot football] (in Greek). Nicosia: The writer. pp. 148–149. ISBN 9963-8720-1-8.

== See also ==
- Cypriot Cup
- 2000–01 Cypriot First Division
