= 1998–99 Cypriot Third Division =

Cypriot Third Division
- Season: 1998–99
- Champions: Chalkanoras (1st title)
- Promoted: Chalkanoras; Iraklis G. APEP Pit.
- Relegated: APEP Pel. ATE PEK; Elia
- Matches played: 182
- Goals scored: 564 (3.1 per match)

The 1998–99 Cypriot Third Division was the 28th season of the Cypriot third-level football league. Chalkanoras Idaliou won their 1st title.

== Format ==
Fourteen teams participated in the 1998–99 Cypriot Third Division. All teams played against each other twice, once at their home and once away. The team with the most points at the end of the season crowned champions. The first three teams were promoted to the 1999–2000 Cypriot Second Division and the last three teams were relegated to the 1999–2000 Cypriot Fourth Division.

=== Point system ===
Teams received three points for a win, one point for a draw and zero points for a loss.

== Changes from previous season ==
Teams promoted to 1998–99 Cypriot Second Division

- AEZ Zakakiou
- AEK/Achilleas Ayiou Theraponta
- Anagennisi Germasogeias

Teams relegated from 1997–98 Cypriot Second Division

- Chalkanoras Idaliou
- Iraklis Gerolakkou
- APEP Pitsilia

Teams promoted from 1997–98 Cypriot Fourth Division

- SEK Agiou Athanasiou
- ATE PEK Ergaton
- Doxa Paliometochou

Teams relegated to 1998–99 Cypriot Fourth Division

- AEK Kakopetrias
- Kinyras Empas
- THOI Lakatamia

== League standings ==
Pos	Team	Pld	W	D	L	GF	GA	GD	Pts	Promotion or relegation
1	Chalkanoras Idaliou (C, P)	26	15	7	4	61	30	+31	52	Promoted to Cypriot Second Division
2	Iraklis Gerolakkou (P)	26	13	7	6	42	34	+8	46	Promoted to Cypriot Second Division
3	APEP Pitsilia (P)	26	13	5	8	36	31	+5	44	Promoted to Cypriot Second Division
4	Enosis Kokkinotrimithia	26	11	8	7	38	27	+11	41	
5	Adonis Idaliou	26	9	11	6	42	35	+7	38	
6	SEK Agiou Athanasiou	26	11	5	10	47	47	0	38	
7	Ayia Napa	26	9	9	8	47	41	+6	36	
8	Othellos Athienou	26	9	8	9	46	39	+7	35	
9	Doxa Paliometochou	26	9	7	10	40	41	−1	34	
10	Ethnikos Latsion FC	26	9	6	11	44	39	+5	33	
11	Achyronas Liopetriou	26	9	6	11	32	42	−10	33	
12	APEP Pelendriou (R)	26	8	5	13	23	34	−11	29	Relegated to Cypriot Fourth Division
13	ATE PEK Ergaton (R)	26	6	7	13	33	56	−23	25	Relegated to Cypriot Fourth Division
14	Elia Lythrodonta (R)	26	4	3	19	33	68	−35	15	Relegated to Cypriot Fourth Division

Rules for classification: 1) Points, 2) Goal differences, 3) Goals for.
(C) Champions; (P) Promoted; (R) Relegated

== Results ==
Home \ Away	ANP	ADN	APE	API	ATE	ACH	DOX	ETL	ELL	ENS	IRK	OTL	SEK	CHL
Ayia Napa		2–2	2–2	0–1	7–2	2–1	1–0	2–0	5–1	3–0	3–2	0–3	4–0	2–2
Adonis	3–2		1–0	4–2	1–1	4–1	3–2	2–1	2–1	1–2	0–0	4–4	1–1	2–3
APEP Pel.	1–3	3–2		0–2	3–0	0–0	0–0	1–0	0–0	1–2	2–3	2–1	4–2	0–1
APEP Pit.	1–0	1–0	0–2		0–0	4–1	4–3	2–0	2–0	1–0	1–3	2–0	3–2	1–0
ATE PEK	3–2	0–0	2–0	2–0		1–2	2–3	2–1	1–2	1–3	0–1	3–1	1–2	2–2
Achyronas	0–0	1–0	3–0	1–0	3–1		1–1	4–3	2–0	0–0	0–1	2–5	2–1	1–3
Doxa	1–1	1–0	2–0	1–1	1–0	2–1		3–0	4–1	1–4	0–0	0–1	5–3	0–0
Ethnikos	7–1	0–0	1–0	2–0	1–1	4–2	5–2		4–1	0–0	1–0	2–3	2–0	1–1
Elia	2–1	3–5	0–1	0–2	2–3	1–1	1–2	1–3		3–2	2–3	2–1	4–6	2–3
Enosis	3–0	0–0	2–0	1–1	1–1	2–0	2–1	3–1	4–1		0–0	1–1	0–1	1–2
Iraklis	2–2	1–1	0–0	3–1	1–1	2–1	4–3	3–2	1–0	1–2		3–1	1–0	2–3
Othellos	0–0	1–2	4–0	1–1	4–1	0–0	3–1	1–1	1–1	2–2	1–2		2–0	3–2
SEK	1–1	1–1	0–1	1–1	5–2	4–0	3–1	1–1	3–2	2–0	2–1	3–2		2–1
Chalkanoras	1–1	1–1	1–0	4–2	8–0	1–2	0–0	3–1	6–0	2–1	5–2	2–0	4–1	

Legend: Blue = home team win; Yellow = draw; Red = away team win.

== See also ==
- Cypriot Third Division
- 1998–99 Cypriot First Division
- 1998–99 Cypriot Cup

== Sources ==
- "1998/99 Cypriot Third Division". Rec.Sport.Soccer Statistics Foundation. 2016-01-14.
