= 1997–98 Cypriot Cup =

Tournament details
- Country: Cyprus
- Dates: 12 November 1997 – 15 May 1998
- Teams: 50

Final positions
- Champions: Anorthosis (7th title)

The 1997–98 Cypriot Cup was the 56th edition of the Cypriot Cup. A total of 50 clubs entered the competition. It began on 12 November 1997 with the preliminary round and concluded on 15 May 1998 with the final which was held at Makario Stadium. Anorthosis won their 7th Cypriot Cup trophy after beating Apollon 3–1 in the final.

== Format ==
In the 1997–98 Cypriot Cup, participated all the teams of the Cypriot First Division, the Cypriot Second Division, the Cypriot Third Division and 8 of the 14 teams of the Cypriot Fourth Division.

The competition consisted of six knock-out rounds. In the preliminary round and in the first round each tie was played as a single leg and was held at the home ground of one of the two teams, according to the draw results. Each tie winner was qualifying to the next round. If a match was drawn, extra time was following. If extra time was drawn, there was a replay at the ground of the team who were away for the first game. If the rematch was also drawn, then extra time was following and if the match remained drawn after extra time the winner was decided by penalty shoot-out.

The next three rounds were played in a two-legged format, each team playing a home and an away match against their opponent. The team which scored more goals on aggregate, was qualifying to the next round. If the two teams scored the same number of goals on aggregate, then the team which scored more goals away from home was advancing to the next round.

If both teams had scored the same number of home and away goals, then extra time was following after the end of the second leg match. If during the extra thirty minutes both teams had managed to score, but they had scored the same number of goals, then the team who scored the away goals was advancing to the next round (i.e. the team which was playing away). If there weren't scored any goals during extra time, the qualifying team was determined by penalty shoot-out.

The cup winner secured a place in the 1998–99 UEFA Cup Winners' Cup.

== Ρreliminary round ==
All the 14 clubs of the Cypriot Second Division, all the 14 clubs of the Cypriot Third Division and 8 clubs from the Cypriot Fourth Division (first eight of the league table the day of draw) participated in the preliminary round.

| Team 1 | Score | Team 2 |
|---|---|---|
| Ayia Napa F.C. (C) | 2–1 | Onisilos Sotira (Β) |
| Achyronas Liopetriou (C) | 4–0 | AMEK Kapsalou (D) |
| Adonis Idaliou (C) | 1–4 | APEP Pelendriou (C) |
| AEK/Achilleas Ayiou Theraponta (C) | 2–1 | Ermis Aradippou (Β) |
| Anagennisi Germasogeias (C) | 2–1 | PAEEK FC (Β) |
| ASIL Lysi (Β) | 2–1 | Othellos Athienou F.C. (C) |
| ATE PEK Ergaton (D) | 0–3 | Doxa Katokopias F.C. (Β) |
| Chalkanoras Idaliou (Β) | 5–0 | AEK Kakopetrias (C) |
| Digenis Akritas Morphou (Β) | 2–0 | Anagennisi Prosfigon Lemesou (D) |
| Doxa Paliometochou (D) | 1–0 | Akritas Chlorakas (Β) |
| ENTHOI Lakatamia FC (C) | 0–2 | Aris Limassol F.C. (Β) |
| Elia Lythrodonta (C) | 3–2 | Poseidonas Giolou (D) |
| Kinyras Empas (C) | 0–9 | Olympiakos Nicosia (Β) |
| MEAP Nisou (D) | 1–4 (a.e.t.) | Enosis Kokkinotrimithia (C) |
| Omonia Aradippou (Β) | 7–0 | APEP F.C. (Β) |
| Orfeas Nicosia (D) | 1–2 | AEZ Zakakiou (C) |
| Rotsidis Mammari (Β) | 5–1 | Iraklis Gerolakkou (Β) |
| SEK Agiou Athanasiou (D) | 9–4 | Ethnikos Latsion (C) |

== First round ==
The 14 clubs of the Cypriot First Division advanced directly to the first round and met the winners of the preliminary round ties:

| Team 1 | Score | Team 2 |
|---|---|---|
| Achyronas Liopetriou (C) | 0–1 | Apollon Limassol (A) |
| AEK Larnaca F.C. (A) | 3–1 | Olympiakos Nicosia (Β) |
| AEK/Achilleas Ayiou Theraponta (C) | 1–4 | Anagennisi Deryneia (A) |
| Alki Larnaca F.C. (A) | 6–1 | SEK Agiou Athanasiou (D) |
| Anagennisi Germasogeias (C) | 1–1, 3–1 | ASIL Lysi (Β) |
| Anorthosis Famagusta FC (A) | 8–1 | Rotsidis Mammari (Β) |
| APEP Pelendriou (C) | 1–0 | Digenis Akritas Morphou (Β) |
| APOEL FC (A) | 6–0 | Enosis Kokkinotrimithia (C) |
| APOP Paphos (A) | 8–0 | Chalkanoras Idaliou (Β) |
| Doxa Katokopias F.C. (Β) | 1–2 | Nea Salamis Famagusta FC (A) |
| Doxa Paliometochou (D) | 2–3 | AEL Limassol (A) |
| Enosis Neon Paralimni FC (A) | 8–1 | Elia Lythrodonta (C) |
| Ethnikos Achna FC (A) | 2–2, 1–0 | Aris Limassol F.C. (Β) |
| Ethnikos Assia F.C. (A) | 2–0 | Ayia Napa F.C. (C) |
| Evagoras Paphos (A) | 5–3 | Omonia Aradippou (Β) |
| AC Omonia (A) | 3–0 | AEZ Zakakiou (C) |

== Second round ==
| Team 1 | Agg. | Team 2 | 1st leg | 2nd leg |
|---|---|---|---|---|
| AEL Limassol (A) | 1–4 | Anagennisi Deryneia (A) | 0–0 | 1–4 |
| Alki Larnaca F.C. (A) | 1–6 | Ethnikos Achna FC (A) | 1–2 | 0–4 |
| Anagennisi Germasogeias (C) | 1–7 | Ethnikos Assia F.C. (A) | 1–3 | 0–4 |
| Anorthosis Famagusta FC (A) | 2–1 | AEK Larnaca F.C. (A) | 1–0 | 1–1 |
| APOEL FC (A) | 2–1 | Enosis Neon Paralimni FC (A) | 1–0 | 1–1 |
| Apollon Limassol (A) | 11–0 | APEP Pelendriou (C) | 8–0 | 3–0 |
| APOP Paphos (A) | 4–2 | Evagoras Paphos (A) | 0–0 | 4–2 |
| AC Omonia (A) | 2–3 | Nea Salamis Famagusta FC (A) | 1–1 | 1–2 |

== Quarter-finals ==
| Team 1 | Agg. | Team 2 | 1st leg | 2nd leg |
|---|---|---|---|---|
| Anorthosis Famagusta FC (A) | 3–1 | APOEL FC (A) | 1–0 | 2–1 |
| Apollon Limassol (A) | 2–0 | Nea Salamis Famagusta FC (A) | 1–1 | 1–0 |
| APOP Paphos (A) | 2–2 (a) | Ethnikos Assia F.C. (A) | 1–0 | 1–2 |
| Ethnikos Achna FC (A) | 4–3 | Anagennisi Deryneia (A) | 1–1 | 3–2 |

== Semi-finals ==
| Team 1 | Agg. | Team 2 | 1st leg | 2nd leg |
|---|---|---|---|---|
| Anorthosis Famagusta FC (A) | 4–1 | Ethnikos Achna FC (A) | 4–0 | 0–1 |
| APOP Paphos (A) | 3–5 | Apollon Limassol (A) | 3–2 | 0–3 |

== Final ==
15 May 1998

| Anorthosis | 3–1 | Apollon |
|---|---|---|
| Krčmarević 24'; Okkas 78'; Louca 82' | | Špoljarić 36' |

Makario Stadium, Nicosia

Cypriot Cup 1997–98 Winners

7th title

== Sources ==
- "1997/98 Cyprus Cup". Rec.Sport.Soccer Statistics Foundation. 2016-01-14.

== See also ==
- Cypriot Cup
- 1997–98 Cypriot First Division
