= Elias Charalambous =

Cypriot footballer and manager (born 1980)

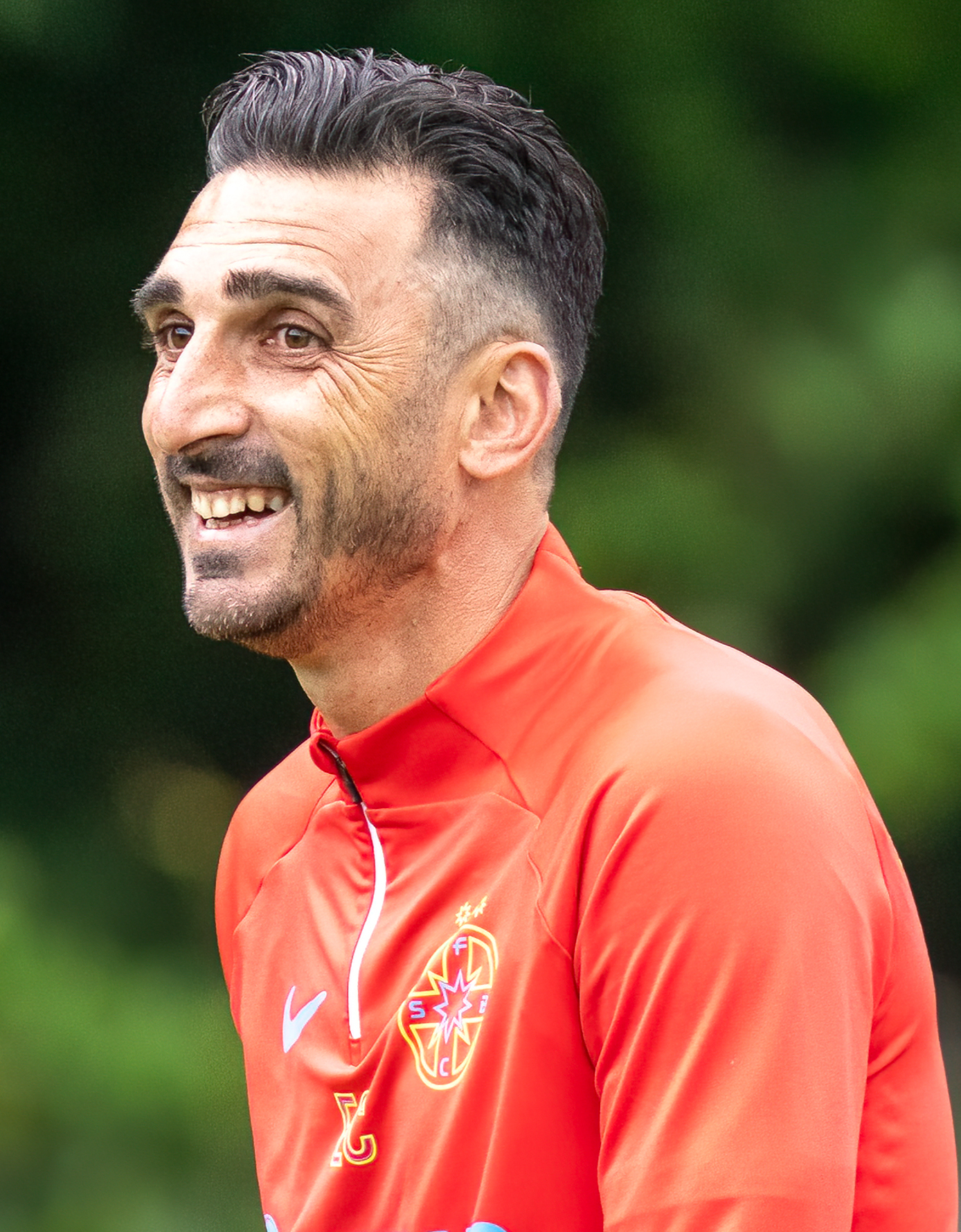
- Charalambous managing FCSB in 2023

Personal information
- Date of birth: 25 September 1980 (age 46)
- Place of birth: East London, South Africa
- Height: 1.82 m (6 ft 0 in)
- Position: Left-back

Team information
- Current team: Levadiakos (head coach)

Youth career
- –1999: Omonia

Senior career*
Years	Team	Apps	(Gls)
1999–2005	Omonia	104	(4)
2005–2008	PAOK	63	(2)
2008–2011	Omonia	68	(7)
2011–2012	Alki Larnaca	16	(2)
2012	Karlsruher SC	15	(1)
2012–2013	Vaslui	18	(1)
2013–2014	Doxa Katokopias	13	(2)
2014	Levadiakos	15	(0)
2014–2017	AEK Larnaca	51	(1)
Total		363	(20)

International career
1998	Cyprus U18	3	(0)
2000–2001	Cyprus U21	7	(1)
2002–2017	Cyprus	69	(0)

Managerial career
- 2017–2019: AEK Larnaca (assistant)
- 2019–2020: AEK Larnaca (caretaker)
- 2020: Hatta Club (assistant)
- 2020–2021: Ethnikos Achna
- 2021–2022: Doxa Katokopias
- 2023–2026: FCSB
- 2026–: Levadiakos
- * Club domestic league appearances and goals

Elias Charalambous (Greek: Ηλίας Χαραλάμπους; born 25 September 1980) is a Cypriot professional football manager and former player, who is currently in charge of Super League Greece club Levadiakos.

== Career statistics ==
=== International ===
Appearances and goals by national team and year
National team	Year	Apps	Goals
Cyprus	2002	1	0
Cyprus	2003	1	0
Cyprus	2004	9	0
Cyprus	2005	7	0
Cyprus	2006	5	0
Cyprus	2007	7	0
Cyprus	2008	6	0
Cyprus	2009	10	0
Cyprus	2010	4	0
Cyprus	2011	2	0
Cyprus	2012	7	0
Cyprus	2013	4	0
Cyprus	2014	2	0
Cyprus	2015	0	0
Cyprus	2016	3	0
Cyprus	2017	1	0
Total		69	0

== Managerial statistics ==
As of match played 22 November 2026

Managerial record by team and tenure
Team	From	To	Record							
Team	From	To	P	W	D	L	GF	GA	GD	Win %
AEK Larnaca (caretaker)	9 December 2019	25 February 2020	13	7	4	2	19	9	+10	53.85
Ethnikos Achna	8 December 2020	22 November 2021	41	15	9	17	52	57	−5	36.59
Doxa Katokopias	7 December 2021	2 May 2022	19	4	6	9	14	23	−9	21.05
FCSB	30 March 2023	7 March 2026	170	88	41	41	269	194	+75	51.76
Levadiakos	25 June 2026	present	12	1	4	7	5	17	−12	8.33
Total			255	115	64	76	359	300	+59	45.10

== Honours ==
=== Player ===
Omonia

- Cypriot First Division: 2000–01, 2002–03, 2009–10
- Cypriot Cup: 1999–2000, 2004–05, 2010–11
- Cypriot Super Cup: 2001, 2003, 2010

=== Coach ===
FCSB

- Liga I: 2023–24, 2024–25
- Supercupa României: 2024, 2025

=== Individual ===
- Liga I Manager of the Season: 2023–24, 2024–25
