= 1997–98 Cypriot Third Division =

Cypriot Third Division
- Season: 1997–98
- Champions: AEZ (2nd title)
- Promoted: AEZ; AEK/Achilleas; Anagennisi G.
- Relegated: AEK Kak. Kinyras; THOI
- Matches played: 182
- Goals scored: 569 (3.13 per match)

The 1997–98 Cypriot Third Division was the 27th season of the Cypriot third-level football league. AEZ Zakakiou won their 2nd title.

== Format ==
Fourteen teams participated in the 1997–98 Cypriot Third Division. All teams played against each other twice, once at their home and once away. The team with the most points at the end of the season crowned champions. The first three teams were promoted to the 1998–99 Cypriot Second Division and the last three teams were relegated to the 1998–99 Cypriot Fourth Division.

=== Point system ===
Teams received three points for a win, one point for a draw and zero points for a loss.

== Changes from previous season ==
Teams promoted to 1997–98 Cypriot Second Division

- Rotsidis Mammari
- Iraklis Gerolakkou
- ASIL Lysi

Teams relegated from 1996–97 Cypriot Second Division

- Achyronas Liopetriou
- AEZ Zakakiou
- AEK Kakopetrias

Teams promoted from 1996–97 Cypriot Fourth Division

- Adonis Idaliou
- Achilleas Ayiou Theraponta (Note: Before the start of the season, Achilleas Ayiou Theraponta and AEK Katholiki were merged forming AEK/Achilleas Ayiou Theraponta, which took the place of Achilleas Ayiou Theraponta in the league.)
- Enosis Kokkinotrimithia

Teams relegated to 1997–98 Cypriot Fourth Division

- Orfeas Nicosia
- AEK Katholiki
- Tsaggaris Peledriou

== League standings ==
Pos	Team	Pld	W	D	L	GF	GA	GD	Pts	Promotion or relegation
1	AEZ Zakakiou (C, P)	26	16	7	3	50	17	+33	55	Promoted to Cypriot Second Division
2	AEK/Achilleas Ayiou Theraponta (P)	26	15	7	4	64	27	+37	52	Promoted to Cypriot Second Division
3	Anagennisi Germasogeias (P)	26	15	7	4	55	26	+29	52	Promoted to Cypriot Second Division
4	Ayia Napa	26	15	6	5	57	25	+32	51	
5	Othellos Athienou	26	9	9	8	43	38	+5	36	
6	Achyronas Liopetriou	26	10	5	11	42	46	−4	35	
7	APEP Pelendriou	26	10	5	11	41	48	−7	35	
8	Elia Lythrodonta	26	7	10	9	36	40	−4	31	
9	Adonis Idaliou	26	6	12	8	45	49	−4	30	
10	Enosis Kokkinotrimithia	26	7	9	10	28	39	−11	30	
11	Ethnikos Latsion FC	26	7	8	11	34	54	−20	29	
12	AEK Kakopetrias (R)	26	7	5	14	28	48	−20	26	Relegated to Cypriot Fourth Division
13	Kinyras Empas (R)	26	6	6	14	29	50	−21	24	Relegated to Cypriot Fourth Division
14	THOI Lakatamia (R)	26	3	2	21	17	62	−45	11	Relegated to Cypriot Fourth Division

Rules for classification: 1) Points, 2) Goal differences, 3) Goals for.
(C) Champions; (P) Promoted; (R) Relegated

== Results ==
Home \ Away	ANP	ADN	AEZ	AEK	AAC	ANG	APP	ACR	ETL	ELL	ENS	THL	KNR	OTL
Ayia Napa		2–0	0–0	1–0	1–4	2–0	5–0	2–1	5–2	1–1	2–0	5–0	6–0	0–1
Adonis	2–2		2–5	2–2	2–2	1–2	1–2	3–3	0–1	4–2	2–2	3–2	0–0	3–4
AEZ	2–1	4–1		4–1	2–1	0–1	2–1	2–0	0–0	2–0	6–0	2–0	1–0	3–0
AEK	0–0	0–1	0–4		2–0	0–0	8–3	1–3	1–2	3–2	0–0	0–1	1–0	2–0
AEK/Achilleas	1–0	1–1	1–1	4–0		0–1	2–0	5–0	7–2	4–1	2–2	2–0	4–0	1–1
Anagennisi	1–1	2–1	1–1	5–1	4–1		1–1	5–1	1–1	2–0	4–2	3–0	5–2	1–1
APEP	2–4	3–4	1–1	1–0	0–4	1–1		1–0	1–0	1–1	1–2	6–0	4–1	2–5
Achyronas	1–1	2–3	1–0	3–1	0–2	0–1	2–1		2–0	4–5	2–1	2–0	1–1	3–3
Ethnikos	1–2	2–2	1–1	1–1	0–2	1–7	0–1	1–6		3–3	2–1	5–1	2–2	2–1
Elia	2–4	0–0	1–0	0–1	0–0	2–1	1–1	4–0	1–1		1–0	2–1	0–1	2–2
Enosis	0–4	2–2	0–1	3–1	1–1	2–0	0–2	2–1	2–0	1–1		2–1	1–0	0–0
THOI	1–2	1–1	1–3	0–2	2–5	0–1	1–0	1–3	1–2	0–2	2–1		1–1	0–1
Kinyras	0–3	1–4	1–2	6–0	3–4	0–4	0–2	0–0	2–0	2–1	0–0	2–0		4–3
Othellos	3–1	0–0	1–1	2–0	1–4	4–1	2–3	0–1	1–2	1–1	1–1	4–0	1–0	

Legend: Blue = home team win; Yellow = draw; Red = away team win.

== See also ==
- Cypriot Third Division
- 1997–98 Cypriot First Division
- 1997–98 Cypriot Cup

== Sources ==
- "1997/98 Cypriot Third Division". Rec.Sport.Soccer Statistics Foundation. 2016-01-14.
