= AMEP Parekklisia =

Cypriot football club

- Founded: 1961
- Ground: Parekklisia Municipal Stadium

AMEP Parekklisia (Sport Cultural Union Parekklisia) is a Cypriot football club based in Parekklisia, Limassol. The team was playing sometimes in Cypriot Third Division and in Cypriot Fourth Division. In 2006 were merged with ATE-PEK Parekklisias to form Enosis Neon Parekklisia F.C. The team refounded in 2018 after the dissolved of Enosis Neon Parekklisia F.C. in 2017.

Omonia Ormideia at CFA's competitions.
Season	League										Cup	
Season	Division	Position	Teams	Played	Won	Drawn	Lost	Goals		Points	Competition	Round
Season	Division	Position	Teams	Played	Won	Drawn	Lost	For	Against	Points	Competition	Round
1998–99	Cypriot Fourth Division	7	15	28	13	3	12	44	36	42	1998–99	-
1999–2000	Cypriot Fourth Division	4	14	26	12	6	8	42	34	42	1999–2000	First Round
1999–2000	Playoff	1	4	6	4	1	1	18	8	13	1999–2000	First Round
2000–01	Cypriot Third Division	13	14	26	7	6	13	34	49	24	2000–01	First Round
2001–02	Cypriot Fourth Division	6	15	28	12	8	8	49	44	44	2001–02	Preliminary
Points: Won=3 points, Drawn=1 points, Lost=0 points
