= 1999–2000 Cypriot Cup =

Tournament details
- Country: Cyprus
- Dates: 10 November 1999 – 13 May 2000
- Teams: 50

Final positions
- Champions: Omonia (11th title)

The 1999–2000 Cypriot Cup was the 58th edition of the Cypriot Cup. A total of 50 clubs entered the competition. It began on 10 November 1999 with the preliminary round and concluded on 13 May 2000 with the final which was held at GSP Stadium. Omonia won their 11th Cypriot Cup trophy after beating APOEL 4–2 in the final.

== Format ==
In the 1999–2000 Cypriot Cup, participated all the teams of the Cypriot First Division, the Cypriot Second Division, the Cypriot Third Division and 8 of the 14 teams of the Cypriot Fourth Division.

The competition consisted of six knock-out rounds. In the preliminary round and in the first round each tie was played as a single leg and was held at the home ground of one of the two teams, according to the draw results. Each tie winner was qualifying to the next round. If a match was drawn, extra time was following. If extra time was drawn, there was a replay at the ground of the team who were away for the first game. If the rematch was also drawn, then extra time was following and if the match remained drawn after extra time the winner was decided by penalty shoot-out.

The next three rounds were played in a two-legged format, each team playing a home and an away match against their opponent. The team which scored more goals on aggregate, was qualifying to the next round. If the two teams scored the same number of goals on aggregate, then the team which scored more goals away from home was advancing to the next round.

If both teams had scored the same number of home and away goals, then extra time was following after the end of the second leg match. If during the extra thirty minutes both teams had managed to score, but they had scored the same number of goals, then the team who scored the away goals was advancing to the next round (i.e. the team which was playing away). If there weren't scored any goals during extra time, the qualifying team was determined by penalty shoot-out.

The cup winner secured a place in the 2000–01 UEFA Cup.

== Ρreliminary round ==
All the 14 clubs of the Cypriot Second Division, all the 14 clubs of the Cypriot Third Division and 8 clubs from the Cypriot Fourth Division (first eight of the league table the day of draw) participated in the preliminary round.

Team 1	Score	Team 2
Ayia Napa F.C. (C)	2–1	ATE PEK Ergaton (D)
Achyronas Liopetriou (C)	2–2, 1–0	AEK Kythreas (D)
AEK/Achilleas Ayiou Theraponta (B)	6–1	Anagennisi Germasogeias (B)
Akritas Chlorakas (C)	2–0	SEK Agiou Athanasiou (C)
Apollon Lympion (D)	0–5	Evagoras Paphos (B)
Aris Limassol F.C. (B)	7–1	Th.O.I Avgorou (D)
Digenis Akritas Morphou (B)	8–1	Othellos Athienou F.C. (C)
Doxa Katokopias F.C. (B)	3–1	Adonis Idaliou (C)
Enosis Kokkinotrimithia (C)	0–3	AEZ Zakakiou (B)
Ermis Aradippou (B)	3–0	Ellinismos Akakiou (C)
Ethnikos Latsion (C)	1–2	AMEP Parekklisia (D)
Iraklis Gerolakkou (B)	1–0	ENTHOI Lakatamia FC (C)
Kinyras Empas (C)	5–1	Rotsidis Mammari (C)
MEAP Nisou (D)	2–1	Chalkanoras Idaliou (B)
Omonia Aradippou (B)	1–2	APEP F.C. (B)
Onisilos Sotira (B)	9–0	Doxa Paliometochou (C)
PAEEK FC (B)	1–2 (a.e.t.)	ASIL Lysi (C)
PEFO Olympiakos (D)	4–1	Elia Lythrodonta (D)

== First round ==
The 14 clubs of the Cypriot First Division advanced directly to the first round and met the winners of the preliminary round ties:

Team 1	Score	Team 2
AEZ Zakakiou (B)	2–1	Anagennisi Deryneia (A)
Akritas Chlorakas (C)	0–4	Olympiakos Nicosia (A)
APEP F.C. (B)	2–4	Ethnikos Assia F.C. (A)
APOP Paphos (A)	1–0	Achyronas Liopetriou (C)
ASIL Lysi (C)	0–3	APOEL FC (A)
Enosis Neon Paralimni FC (A)	3–0	Ayia Napa F.C. (C)
Ermis Aradippou (B)	0–5	Anorthosis Famagusta FC (A)
Ethnikos Achna FC (A)	2–0	Doxa Katokopias F.C. (B)
Evagoras Paphos (B)	1–3	Aris Limassol F.C. (B)
Iraklis Gerolakkou (B)	1–3	Alki Larnaca F.C. (A)
Kinyras Empas (C)	0–3	AEK Larnaca F.C. (A)
MEAP Nisou (D)	1–3	AEL Limassol (A)
Nea Salamis Famagusta FC (A)	3–1	Digenis Akritas Morphou (B)
AC Omonia (A)	6–0	AMEP Parekklisia (D)
Onisilos Sotira (B)	2–1	AEK/Achilleas Ayiou Theraponta (B)
PEFO Olympiakos (D)	0–8	Apollon Limassol (A)

== Second round ==
Team 1	Agg.	Team 2	1st leg	2nd leg
AEK Larnaca F.C. (A)	2–1	Nea Salamis Famagusta FC (A)	2–0	0–1
Alki Larnaca F.C. (A)	2–3	Ethnikos Achna FC (A)	1–1	1–2
Anorthosis Famagusta FC (A)	8–1	Enosis Neon Paralimni FC (A)	3–0	5–1
Apollon Limassol (A)	5–6	APOEL FC (A)	2–4	3–2
Aris Limassol F.C. (B)	2–5	Ethnikos Assia F.C. (A)	1–3	1–2
Olympiakos Nicosia (A)	1–1 (a)	AEL Limassol (A)	1–1	0–0
AC Omonia (A)	7–0	AEZ Zakakiou (B)	3–0	4–0
Onisilos Sotira (B)	2–5	APOP Paphos (A)	1–1	1–4

== Quarter-finals ==
Team 1	Agg.	Team 2	1st leg	2nd leg
AEK Larnaca F.C. (A)	4–1	Ethnikos Assia F.C. (A)	2–0	2–1
APOEL FC (A)	9–1	APOP Paphos (A)	3–0	6–1
Ethnikos Achna FC (A)	1–5	AEL Limassol (A)	1–2	0–3
AC Omonia (A)	2–0	Anorthosis Famagusta FC (A)	2–0	0–0

== Semi-finals ==
Team 1	Agg.	Team 2	1st leg	2nd leg
APOEL FC (A)	2–0	AEK Larnaca F.C. (A)	0–0	2–0
AC Omonia (A)	7–1	AEL Limassol (A)	3–0	4–1

== Final ==
13 May 2000

Omonia	4–2	APOEL
Mihajlović 36' 88' (pen.); Rauffmann 43' 62'		Yiasoumi 64' (pen.); Oreshchuk 85'

GSP Stadium, Nicosia
Attendance: 22,225
Referee: Louis Loizou

Cypriot Cup 1999–2000 Winners
Omonia
11th title

== Sources ==
- "1999/2000 Cyprus Cup". Rec.Sport.Soccer Statistics Foundation. 2016-01-14.
- Gavreilides, Michalis; Papamoiseos, Stelios (2001). Ένας αιώνας Κυπριακό ποδόσφαιρο [One century Cypriot football] (in Greek). Nicosia: The writer. pp. 146–147. ISBN 9963-8720-1-8.

== See also ==
- Cypriot Cup
- 1999–2000 Cypriot First Division
