= Kentro Neotitas Kalou Choriou "Commandaria" =

Cypriot football club

- Founded: 1979
- Dissolved: 1998

Kentro Neotitas Kalou Choriou "Commandaria" was a Cypriot association football club based in Kalo Chorio, Limassol, located in the Limassol District. It had 2 participations in Cypriot Fourth Division. On 1998 merged with Th.O.I. Agios Georgios Kalou Choriou to form PAOK Kalou Choriou.
