= 1998–99 Cypriot Second Division =

Cypriot Second Division
- Season: 1998–99
- Champions: Anagennisi D. (1st title)
- Promoted: Anagennisi D.; Ethnikos; APOP
- Relegated: Rotsidis; ASIL; Akritas
- Matches played: 182
- Goals scored: 536 (2.95 per match)

The 1998–99 Cypriot Second Division was the 44th season of the Cypriot second-level football league. Anagennisi Deryneia won their 1st title.

== Format ==
Fourteen teams participated in the 1998–99 Cypriot Second Division. All teams played against each other twice, once at their home and once away. The team with the most points at the end of the season crowned champions. The first three teams were promoted to 1999–2000 Cypriot First Division and the last three teams were relegated to the 1999–2000 Cypriot Third Division.

== Changes from previous season ==
Teams promoted to 1998–99 Cypriot First Division

- Olympiakos Nicosia
- Aris Limassol
- Doxa Katokopias

Teams relegated from 1997–98 Cypriot First Division

- Anagennisi Deryneia
- APOP Paphos
- Ethnikos Assia

Teams promoted from 1997–98 Cypriot Third Division

- AEZ Zakakiou
- AEK/Achilleas Ayiou Theraponta
- Anagennisi Germasogeias

Teams relegated to 1998–99 Cypriot Third Division

- Chalkanoras Idaliou
- Iraklis Gerolakkou
- APEP

== League standings ==
Pos	Team	Pld	W	D	L	GF	GA	GD	Pts	Promotion or relegation
1	Anagennisi Deryneia (C, P)	26	16	6	4	48	23	+25	54	Promoted to Cypriot First Division
2	Ethnikos Assia (P)	26	15	6	5	48	26	+22	51	Promoted to Cypriot First Division
3	APOP Paphos (P)	26	14	7	5	51	29	+22	49	Promoted to Cypriot First Division
4	AEK/Achilleas Ayiou Theraponta	26	10	10	6	38	32	+6	40	
5	AEZ Zakakiou	26	11	7	8	35	36	−1	40	
6	Ermis Aradippou	26	11	4	11	43	37	+6	37	
7	Onisilos Sotira	26	10	6	10	45	37	+8	36	
8	Digenis Akritas Morphou	26	8	11	7	41	34	+7	35	
9	Anagennisi Germasogeias	26	10	4	12	36	37	−1	34	
10	PAEEK FC	26	9	7	10	37	39	−2	34	
11	Omonia Aradippou	26	9	7	10	35	39	−4	34	
12	Rotsidis Mammari (R)	26	10	3	13	34	47	−13	33	Relegated to Cypriot Third Division
13	ASIL Lysi (R)	26	4	5	17	22	60	−38	17	Relegated to Cypriot Third Division
14	Akritas Chlorakas (R)	26	3	1	22	23	60	−37	10	Relegated to Cypriot Third Division

Rules for classification: 1) Points, 2) Goal differences, 3) Goal for
(C) Champions; (P) Promoted; (R) Relegated

== Results ==
Home \ Away	AEZ	AEK	AKR	ANG	AND	APP	ASL	DGN	ETH	ERM	OMN	ONS	PKK	RTS
AEZ Zakakiou		2–2	1–0	2–0	0–2	4–4	2–0	1–1	0–2	1–2	2–0	1–0	2–0	3–1
AEK/Achilleas Ayiou Theraponta	1–1		5–3	2–1	1–0	3–0	3–4	1–1	1–1	1–0	0–2	2–1	3–1	1–0
Akritas	0–1	1–0		0–2	1–2	0–1	0–1	1–1	2–4	2–3	0–2	1–3	1–4	1–2
Anagennisi G.	2–2	0–0	3–1		3–0	2–3	2–1	2–0	1–0	0–1	1–0	3–2	0–3	1–2
Anagennisi D.	2–0	1–0	2–0	1–0		2–1	1–1	2–2	0–0	2–0	6–2	1–1	4–2	6–1
APOP	1–2	2–0	3–0	2–1	2–0		3–0	2–1	0–0	2–0	4–0	0–0	1–0	2–2
ASIL	1–1	0–3	1–5	1–2	1–4	2–2		2–0	1–0	0–4	0–2	0–5	0–1	3–4
Digenis	1–1	1–1	4–0	4–3	0–3	1–1	4–0		1–1	2–1	3–1	0–0	4–2	0–1
Ethnikos	2–3	3–0	3–0	3–1	0–2	1–1	2–1	1–0		4–2	3–1	2–0	4–2	3–0
Ermis	3–1	2–3	4–0	0–0	2–0	3–2	0–0	2–2	1–2		2–2	1–3	2–0	1–2
Omonia	1–2	1–1	2–1	1–0	0–1	2–1	3–0	2–2	2–2	1–0		0–2	1–1	4–0
Onisilos	5–0	2–2	2–1	3–2	2–2	1–5	1–0	3–2	2–3	1–2	1–1		1–2	2–0
PAEEK FC	1–0	1–1	3–0	1–1	0–0	1–2	2–2	0–3	2–1	4–2	1–1	2–1		0–1
Rotsidis	2–0	1–1	1–2	2–3	1–2	1–4	4–0	0–1	0–1	0–3	3–1	2–1	1–1	

Legend: Blue = home team win; Yellow = draw; Red = away team win.

== See also ==
- Cypriot Second Division
- 1998–99 Cypriot First Division
- 1998–99 Cypriot Cup

== Sources ==
- "1998/99 Cypriot Second Division". Rec.Sport.Soccer Statistics Foundation. 2016-01-14.
