= 1997–98 Cypriot Second Division =

Cypriot Second Division
- Season: 1997–98
- Champions: Olympiakos (2nd title)
- Promoted: Olympiakos; Doxa; Aris
- Relegated: Chalkanoras; Iraklis; APEP
- Matches played: 182
- Goals scored: 548 (3.01 per match)

The 1997–98 Cypriot Second Division was the 43rd season of the Cypriot second-level football league. Olympiakos won their 2nd title.

== Format ==
Fourteen teams participated in the 1997–98 Cypriot Second Division. Each team played against every other team twice, once at home and once away. The team with the most points at the end of the season was crowned champions. The top three teams were promoted to 1998–99 Cypriot First Division and the bottom three teams were relegated to the 1998–99 Cypriot Third Division.

== Changes from previous season ==
Teams promoted to 1997–98 Cypriot First Division

- AEL Limassol
- Evagoras Paphos
- Ethnikos Assia

Teams relegated from 1996–97 Cypriot First Division

- Aris Limassol
- Olympiakos Nicosia
- APEP

Teams promoted from 1996–97 Cypriot Third Division

- Rotsidis Mammari
- Iraklis Gerolakkou
- ASIL Lysi

Teams relegated to 1997–98 Cypriot Third Division

- Achyronas Liopetriou
- AEZ Zakakiou
- AEK Kakopetrias

== League standings ==
| Pos | Team | Pld | W | D | L | GF | GA | GD | Pts | Promotion or relegation |
|---|---|---|---|---|---|---|---|---|---|---|
| 1 | Olympiakos Nicosia (C, P) | 26 | 21 | 3 | 2 | 73 | 21 | +52 | 66 | Promoted to Cypriot First Division |
| 2 | Doxa Katokopias (P) | 26 | 18 | 5 | 3 | 49 | 25 | +24 | 59 | Promoted to Cypriot First Division |
| 3 | Aris Limassol (P) | 26 | 17 | 4 | 5 | 65 | 30 | +35 | 55 | Promoted to Cypriot First Division |
| 4 | Digenis Morphou | 26 | 15 | 5 | 6 | 40 | 25 | +15 | 50 | |
| 5 | Ermis Aradippou | 26 | 9 | 7 | 10 | 31 | 29 | +2 | 34 | |
| 6 | Omonia Aradippou | 26 | 8 | 7 | 11 | 40 | 37 | +3 | 31 | |
| 7 | Onisilos Sotira | 26 | 10 | 1 | 15 | 35 | 44 | −9 | 31 | |
| 8 | ASIL Lysi | 26 | 8 | 7 | 11 | 32 | 41 | −9 | 31 | |
| 9 | PAEEK FC | 26 | 9 | 4 | 13 | 43 | 54 | −11 | 31 | |
| 10 | Rotsidis Mammari | 26 | 8 | 7 | 11 | 34 | 45 | −11 | 31 | |
| 11 | Akritas Chlorakas | 26 | 8 | 5 | 13 | 28 | 34 | −6 | 29 | |
| 12 | Chalkanoras Idaliou (R) | 26 | 8 | 5 | 13 | 36 | 43 | −7 | 29 | Relegated to Cypriot Third Division |
| 13 | Iraklis Gerolakkou (R) | 26 | 6 | 4 | 16 | 22 | 49 | −27 | 22 | Relegated to Cypriot Third Division |
| 14 | APEP (R) | 26 | 4 | 2 | 20 | 20 | 71 | −51 | 14 | Relegated to Cypriot Third Division |

Rules for classification: 1) Points, 2) Goal differences, 3) Goal for
(C) Champions; (P) Promoted; (R) Relegated

== Results ==
| Home \ Away | AKR | APP | ARS | ASL | DGN | DOX | ERM | IRK | OLM | OMN | ONS | PAK | ROT | CHL |
|---|---|---|---|---|---|---|---|---|---|---|---|---|---|---|
| Akritas | | 0–0 | 0–2 | 1–2 | 0–2 | 2–1 | 0–0 | 2–1 | 1–3 | 1–1 | 1–0 | 2–1 | 2–0 | 5–0 |
| APEP | 0–1 | | 4–4 | 1–0 | 1–4 | 0–4 | 0–3 | 0–2 | 0–4 | 0–4 | 2–1 | 3–0 | 2–3 | 4–3 |
| Aris | 2–1 | 2–0 | | 3–3 | 0–1 | 4–0 | 2–0 | 5–0 | 1–2 | 2–0 | 4–3 | 2–1 | 5–1 | 3–1 |
| ASIL | 3–2 | 1–0 | 2–3 | | 3–0 | 0–1 | 1–1 | 2–2 | 0–1 | 1–1 | 3–1 | 3–1 | 0–1 | 1–0 |
| Digenis | 1–0 | 3–0 | 2–0 | 2–0 | | 1–1 | 3–1 | 2–0 | 2–1 | 2–0 | 2–1 | 2–2 | 2–2 | 0–0 |
| Doxa | 1–0 | 5–1 | 2–0 | 3–1 | 1–0 | | 2–2 | 2–1 | 4–1 | 3–1 | 3–0 | 1–0 | 2–1 | 2–2 |
| Ermis | 2–1 | 2–0 | 0–2 | 2–1 | 1–0 | 0–0 | | 2–0 | 1–3 | 1–1 | 1–3 | 1–1 | 4–0 | 3–0 |
| Iraklis | 1–0 | 3–1 | 0–1 | 1–2 | 1–2 | 0–2 | 2–1 | | 1–1 | 0–2 | 1–0 | 3–0 | 0–0 | 0–0 |
| Olympiakos | 3–0 | 3–1 | 3–3 | 4–0 | 2–0 | 3–0 | 4–0 | 1–0 | | 2–0 | 3–1 | 3–2 | 3–0 | 6–0 |
| Omonia | 1–1 | 2–0 | 0–5 | 4–0 | 1–2 | 1–1 | 0–0 | 7–1 | 1–3 | | 1–2 | 3–1 | 1–2 | 0–0 |
| Onisilos | 0–1 | 4–0 | 1–0 | 3–0 | 0–0 | 0–1 | 1–0 | 2–1 | 0–6 | 1–3 | | 1–2 | 3–1 | 2–0 |
| PAEEK FC | 2–0 | 5–0 | 0–6 | 0–0 | 2–3 | 3–4 | 1–0 | 2–1 | 1–4 | 4–3 | 4–3 | | 1–1 | 3–1 |
| Rotsidis | 2–2 | 2–0 | 2–2 | 1–1 | 3–1 | 1–2 | 0–3 | 3–0 | 2–2 | 1–0 | 4–1 | 1–3 | | 0–1 |
| Chalkanoras | 3–2 | 6–0 | 1–2 | 2–2 | 2–1 | 0–1 | 1–0 | 7–0 | 0–2 | 1–2 | 0–1 | 3–1 | 2–0 | |

Legend: Blue = home team win; Yellow = draw; Red = away team win.

== See also ==
- Cypriot Second Division
- 1997–98 Cypriot First Division
- 1997–98 Cypriot Cup

== Sources ==
- "1997/98 Cypriot Second Division". Rec.Sport.Soccer Statistics Foundation. 2016-01-14.
