= 1999–2000 Cypriot Second Division =

Cypriot Second Division
- Season: 1999–2000
- Champions: Digenis (2nd title)
- Promoted: Digenis; Aris; Doxa
- Relegated: PAEEK FC; Iraklis
- Matches: 182
- Goals: 614 (3.37 per match)

The 1999–2000 Cypriot Second Division was the 45th season of the Cypriot second-level football league. Digenis won their 2nd title.

== Format ==
Fourteen teams participated in the 1999–2000 Cypriot Second Division. All teams played against each other twice, once at their home and once away. The team with the most points at the end of the season crowned champions. The first three teams were promoted to 2000–01 Cypriot First Division and the last three teams were relegated to the 2000–01 Cypriot Third Division. However, in the summer, after the end of the championship, Evagoras Paphos merged with APOP Paphos to form AEP Paphos (AEP took the place of APOP to 2000–01 Cypriot First Division). Because of this, playoff matches were played between the bottom three teams of 1999–2000 Cypriot Second Division and the fourth team of 1999–2000 Cypriot Third Division (ASIL Lysi), for the extra place in 2000–01 Cypriot Second Division.

== Changes from previous season ==
Teams promoted to 1999–2000 Cypriot First Division

- Anagennisi Deryneia
- Ethnikos Assia
- APOP

Teams relegated from 1998–99 Cypriot First Division

- Evagoras Paphos
- Doxa Katokopias
- Aris Limassol

Teams promoted from 1998–99 Cypriot Third Division

- Chalkanoras Idaliou
- Iraklis Gerolakkou
- APEP

Teams relegated to 1999–2000 Cypriot Third Division

- Rotsidis Mammari
- ASIL Lysi
- Akritas Chlorakas

== League standings ==
Pos	Team	Pld	W	D	L	GF	GA	GD	Pts	Promotion or qualification
1	Digenis Morphou (C, P)	26	20	2	4	77	20	+57	62	Promoted to Cypriot First Division
2	Aris Limassol (P)	26	19	3	4	71	31	+40	60	Promoted to Cypriot First Division
3	Doxa Katokopias (P)	26	17	6	3	62	25	+37	57	Promoted to Cypriot First Division
4	APEP	26	14	4	8	51	36	+15	46	
5	Chalkanoras Idaliou	26	12	4	10	38	41	−3	40	
6	Evagoras Paphos	26	10	6	10	35	38	−3	36	
7	Omonia Aradippou	26	9	6	11	42	43	−1	33	
8	Ermis Aradippou	26	9	5	12	47	39	+8	32	
9	AEK/Achilleas Ayiou Theraponta	26	8	8	10	43	52	−9	32	
10	Onisilos Sotira	26	8	7	11	39	45	−6	31	
11	AEZ Zakakiou	26	7	6	13	36	46	−10	27	
12	PAEEK FC (R)	26	6	4	16	23	60	−37	22	Qualification for relegation play-offs
13	Anagennisi Germasogeias	26	5	5	16	23	64	−41	20	Qualification for relegation play-offs
14	Iraklis Gerolakkou (R)	26	3	4	19	27	74	−47	13	Qualification for relegation play-offs

Rules for classification: 1) Points, 2) Goal differences, 3) Goal for
(C) Champions; (P) Promoted; (R) Relegated

== Results ==
Home \ Away	AEZ	AEK	ANG	APP	ARS	DGN	DXK	ERM	EGR	IRK	OMN	ONS	PAK	CHL
AEZ Zakakiou		1–1	0–0	0–1	1–3	0–3	2–6	1–1	0–0	3–0	1–0	2–3	2–1	1–1
AEK/Achilleas Ayiou Theraponta	2–0		2–3	1–4	2–2	1–4	0–3	1–0	2–1	2–2	3–2	5–0	4–1	1–2
Anagennisi	1–4	1–1		1–1	0–4	1–9	0–4	2–0	0–2	3–1	2–2	2–1	0–0	1–2
APEP	2–0	1–2	2–0		0–1	1–1	2–1	2–0	2–1	1–0	3–0	5–0	4–1	3–1
Aris	3–2	3–2	2–0	3–0		2–1	2–3	3–2	4–0	6–1	1–0	3–2	5–2	3–0
Digenis	5–0	5–1	5–1	4–1	3–1		3–2	2–1	2–0	4–0	2–0	1–0	3–0	1–2
Doxa	2–1	4–1	4–1	3–0	2–1	0–0		2–2	1–0	4–2	2–2	1–0	4–0	3–0
Ermis	0–1	5–0	3–1	2–4	1–2	1–4	0–2		1–2	4–1	2–0	2–0	5–0	3–0
Evagoras	1–0	1–3	5–1	2–0	0–0	0–3	0–0	2–2		1–0	2–1	2–2	3–4	3–1
Iraklis	2–6	2–1	0–2	2–2	2–9	0–4	2–1	1–3	1–2		2–2	2–1	1–2	1–4
Omonia	3–1	2–2	1–0	5–1	2–1	3–2	1–4	2–2	2–3	2–1		1–1	2–0	3–1
Onisilos	2–1	2–2	5–0	2–2	1–2	1–3	1–1	2–1	2–2	0–0	2–1		5–1	2–0
PAEEK FC	2–2	0–0	1–0	0–5	1–4	1–0	2–2	0–2	2–0	2–1	0–2	0–1		0–2
Chalkanoras	1–4	1–1	3–0	3–2	1–1	0–3	0–1	2–2	2–0	3–0	2–1	3–1	1–0	

Legend: Blue = home team win; Yellow = draw; Red = away team win.

== Relegation play-offs ==
Pos	Team	Pld	W	D	L	GF	GA	GD	Pts	Qualification
1	Anagennisi Germasogeias	6	4	2	0	16	4	+12	14	Remain in Cypriot Second Division
2	ASIL Lysi	6	3	2	1	13	7	+6	11	Relegated to Cypriot Third Division
3	PAEEK FC (R)	6	1	2	3	9	19	−10	5	Relegated to Cypriot Third Division
4	Iraklis Gerolakkou (R)	6	0	2	4	3	11	−8	2	Relegated to Cypriot Third Division

Rules for classification: 1) Points, 2) Goal differences, 3) Goal for
(R) Relegated

Home \ Away	ANG	ASL	IRK	PAK
Anagennisi		2–0	3–0	3–2
ASIL	0–0		1–0	6–2
Iraklis	0–0	2–5		0–0
PAEEK FC	2–8	1–1	2–1	

Legend: Blue = home team win; Yellow = draw; Red = away team win.

== See also ==
- Cypriot Second Division
- 1999–2000 Cypriot First Division
- 1999–2000 Cypriot Cup

== Sources ==
- "1999/2000 Cypriot Second Division". Rec.Sport.Soccer Statistics Foundation. 2016-01-14.
