= PAOK Kalou Choriou =

Cypriot football club

- Founded: 1998; 27 years ago

PAOK Kalou Choriou (Greek: ΠΑΟΚ Καλού Χωριού) was a Cypriot association football club based in Kalo Chorio, Limassol, located in the Limassol District. It had 1 participation in Cypriot Fourth Division. The team is the theoretical continuitation of Kentro Neotitas Kalou Choriou "Commandaria" and Th.O.I. Agios Georgios Kalou Choriou.
