= 1998–99 Cypriot First Division =

Cypriot First Division
- Season: 1998–99
- Champions: Anorthosis (10th title)
- Relegated: Evagoras; Doxa; Aris
- Champions League: Anorthosis (2nd qualifying round)
- UEFA Cup: Omonia (qualifying round); APOEL (qualifying round; via Cypriot Cup)
- Matches played: 182
- Goals scored: 731 (4.02 per match)
- Top goalscorer: Rainer Rauffmann (35 goals)

The 1998–99 Cypriot First Division was the 60th season of the Cypriot top-level football league. Anorthosis won their 10th title.

== Format ==
Fourteen teams participated in the 1998–99 Cypriot First Division. All teams played against each other twice, once at their home and once away. The team with the most points at the end of the season crowned champions. The last three teams were relegated to the 1999–2000 Cypriot Second Division.

The champions ensured their participation in the 1999–2000 UEFA Champions League and the runners-up in the 1999–2000 UEFA Cup.

=== Point system ===
Teams received three points for a win, one point for a draw and zero points for a loss.

== Changes from previous season ==
Anagennisi Deryneia, APOP Paphos and Ethnikos Assia were relegated from previous season and played in the 1998–99 Cypriot Second Division. They were replaced by the first three teams of the 1997–98 Cypriot Second Division, Olympiakos Nicosia, Doxa Katokopias and Aris Limassol.

== Stadia and locations ==
1998–99 Cypriot First Division

Club	Venue
ΑΕΚ	GSZ Stadium
AEL	Tsirion Stadium
Alki	GSZ Stadium
Anorthosis	Antonis Papadopoulos Stadium
APOEL	Makario Stadium
Apollon	Tsirion Stadium
Aris	Tsirion Stadium
Doxa	Kykkos Stadium
Ethnikos	Dasaki Stadium
Enosis	Paralimni Municipal Stadium
Evagoras	Pafiako Stadium
Nea Salamina	Ammochostos Stadium
Olympiakos	Makario Stadium
Omonia	Makario Stadium

== League standings ==
Pos	Team	Pld	W	D	L	GF	GA	GD	Pts	Qualification or relegation
1	Anorthosis (C)	26	21	4	1	95	28	+67	67	Qualification for Champions League second qualifying round
2	Omonia	26	21	4	1	81	25	+56	67	Qualification for UEFA Cup qualifying round (Note: APOEL qualified for the UEFA Cup qualifying round by winning the 1998–99 Cypriot Cup.)
3	APOEL	26	19	2	5	70	29	+41	59	Qualification for UEFA Cup qualifying round
4	AEK	26	14	3	9	63	45	+18	45	
5	AEL	26	13	5	8	55	39	+16	44	
6	Ethnikos	26	12	6	8	49	43	+6	42	
7	Apollon	26	13	2	11	51	45	+6	41	
8	Enosis Neon Paralimni	26	8	8	10	55	64	−9	32	
9	Olympiakos	26	8	5	13	40	49	−9	29	
10	Nea Salamis	26	8	4	14	46	53	−7	28	
11	Alki	26	7	4	15	37	70	−33	25	
12	Evagoras (R)	26	6	4	16	30	66	−36	22	Relegation to Cypriot Second Division
13	Doxa (R)	26	2	3	21	27	79	−52	9	Relegation to Cypriot Second Division
14	Aris (R)	26	3	0	23	32	96	−64	9	Relegation to Cypriot Second Division

Rules for classification: 1) Points, 2) Goal differences, 3) Goals for.
(C) Champions; (R) Relegated

== Results ==
Home \ Away	AEK	AEL	ALK	ANR	APN	APL	ARS	DOX	ETH	ENP	EYG	NSL	OLY	OMO
AEK		1–1	5–1	3–3	3–1	3–5	5–1	7–0	2–5	3–0	2–0	4–1	4–2	0–1
AEL	3–2		2–2	2–3	2–1	2–1	4–1	4–3	2–3	0–1	4–0	8–3	4–2	3–3
Alki	5–4	1–3		0–4	0–6	0–2	3–2	2–1	2–3	2–2	3–1	0–2	1–3	1–4
Anorthosis	1–0	2–0	5–0		1–1	4–2	5–0	7–0	2–0	5–1	6–1	5–3	7–1	2–2
APOEL	3–1	2–0	4–1	4–3		1–0	5–2	3–0	1–0	2–2	4–1	3–0	2–0	1–2
Apollon	5–0	3–2	4–1	1–3	2–1		2–1	5–2	1–2	1–0	2–0	1–2	1–0	1–5
Aris	1–2	0–4	1–4	1–4	1–4	0–5		2–1	1–3	2–4	2–4	3–1	0–2	0–4
Doxa	1–5	0–1	3–1	0–4	0–4	1–2	5–1		0–0	4–5	0–0	0–3	1–4	2–3
Ethnikos	1–1	2–1	2–0	0–2	2–3	6–1	3–2	0–0		1–1	2–0	2–3	1–1	2–4
Enosis	1–2	0–2	1–1	2–5	3–5	1–1	6–2	5–3	3–6		6–1	0–3	2–0	1–1
Evagoras	2–0	0–0	0–2	0–4	2–3	2–1	5–2	4–0	1–2	1–1		0–0	1–0	1–8
Nea Salamis	0–1	0–0	1–2	2–3	0–1	2–2	2–3	2–0	4–0	4–5	4–1		0–0	2–3
Olympiakos	1–2	0–1	2–2	1–4	0–5	2–0	4–0	4–0	1–1	2–2	2–1	2–1		0–1
Omonia	0–1	3–0	3–0	1–1	1–0	2–0	5–1	1–0	4–0	5–0	6–1	4–1	5–4	

Legend: Blue = home team win; Yellow = draw; Red = away team win.

== See also ==
- Cypriot First Division
- 1998–99 Cypriot Cup
- List of top goalscorers in Cypriot First Division by season
- Cypriot football clubs in European competitions

== Sources ==
- "1998/99 Cypriot First Division". Rec.Sport.Soccer Statistics Foundation. 2016-01-14.
