= 1999–2000 Cypriot First Division =

Cypriot First Division
- Season: 1999–2000
- Champions: Anorthosis (11th title)
- Relegated: Ethnikos Assia; Anagennisi; Alki
- Champions League: Anorthosis (2nd qualifying round)
- UEFA Cup: Omonia (qualifying round); APOEL (qualifying round; via Cypriot Cup)
- Intertoto Cup: Nea Salamis (1st round)
- Matches: 182
- Goals: 670 (3.68 per match)
- Top goalscorer: Rainer Rauffmann (34 goals)

The 1999–2000 Cypriot First Division was the 61st season of the Cypriot top-level football league. Anorthosis won their 11th title.

== Format ==
Fourteen teams participated in the 1999–2000 Cypriot First Division. All teams played against each other twice, once at their home and once away. The team with the most points at the end of the season crowned champions. The last three teams were relegated to the 2000–01 Cypriot Second Division.

The champions ensured their participation in the 2000–01 UEFA Champions League and the runners-up in the 2000–01 UEFA Cup.

The teams had to declare their interest to participate in the 2000 UEFA Intertoto Cup before the end of the championship. At the end of the championship, the higher placed team among the interested ones participated in the Intertoto Cup (if they had not secured their participation in any other UEFA competition).

=== Point system ===
Teams received three points for a win, one point for a draw and zero points for a loss.

== Changes from previous season ==
Evagoras Paphos, Doxa Katokopia and Aris Limassol were relegated from previous season and played in the 1999–2000 Cypriot Second Division. They were replaced by the first three teams of the 1998–99 Cypriot Second Division, Anagennisi Deryneia, Ethnikos Assia and APOP Paphos.

== Stadia and locations ==
1999–2000 Cypriot First Division

Club	Venue
ΑΕΚ	GSZ Stadium
AEL	Tsirion Stadium
Alki	GSZ Stadium
Anagennisi	Anagennisi Football Ground
Anorthosis	Antonis Papadopoulos Stadium
APOEL	Makario Stadium
Apollon	Tsirion Stadium
APOP	Pafiako Stadium
Ethnikos Achna	Dasaki Stadium
Ethnikos Assia	Kykkos Stadium
Enosis	Paralimni Municipal Stadium
Nea Salamina	Ammochostos Stadium
Olympiakos	Makario Stadium
Omonia	Makario Stadium

== League standings ==
Pos	Team	Pld	W	D	L	GF	GA	GD	Pts	Qualification or relegation
1	Anorthosis (C)	26	21	2	3	82	28	+54	65	Qualification for Champions League second qualifying round
2	Omonia	26	18	5	3	71	27	+44	59	Qualification for UEFA Cup qualifying round (Note: The third team, APOEL, qualified to 2000–01 UEFA Cup because the second team, Omonia, already qualified to the same competition through Cypriot Cup.)
3	APOEL	26	14	4	8	58	31	+27	46	Qualification for UEFA Cup qualifying round
4	Nea Salamis	26	13	4	9	58	34	+24	43	Qualification for Intertoto Cup first round
5	Apollon	26	13	3	10	49	44	+5	42	
6	AEL	26	13	3	10	45	42	+3	42	
7	AEK	26	13	2	11	42	39	+3	41	
8	Enosis Neon Paralimni	26	11	3	12	51	50	+1	36	
9	Olympiakos	26	10	6	10	57	58	−1	36	
10	Ethnikos Achna	26	10	5	11	42	36	+6	35	
11	APOP	26	9	5	12	38	47	−9	32	
12	Ethnikos Assia (R)	26	9	4	13	35	38	−3	31	Relegation to Cypriot Second Division
13	Anagennisi (R)	26	4	0	22	22	87	−65	12	Relegation to Cypriot Second Division
14	Alki (R)	26	1	0	25	20	109	−89	3	Relegation to Cypriot Second Division

Rules for classification: 1) Points, 2) Goal differences, 3) Goals for.
(C) Champions; (R) Relegated

== Results ==
Home \ Away	AEK	AEL	ALK	ANG	ANR	APN	APL	APP	EAS	EAC	ENP	NSL	OLY	OMO
AEK		3–2	4–2	4–1	0–3	1–2	2–0	0–0	2–1	1–2	2–1	0–1	3–1	0–4
AEL	2–0		6–1	1–0	2–3	1–0	1–2	2–1	2–1	0–0	2–0	0–3	4–1	0–0
Alki	2–7	1–3		1–3	1–5	1–4	0–6	2–3	0–2	0–4	2–1	0–9	1–2	0–3
Anagennisi	0–1	1–3	3–1		0–4	0–5	0–1	3–1	1–5	1–3	0–3	0–4	1–2	0–7
Anorthosis	1–2	6–1	4–0	4–1		1–1	3–1	4–0	5–0	3–1	4–1	1–0	3–0	5–3
APOEL	1–0	2–0	6–0	5–0	0–2		2–1	2–2	3–2	2–1	3–2	1–2	8–2	3–3
Apollon	3–1	1–3	3–1	1–0	3–2	2–1		4–1	2–0	0–0	3–1	2–1	3–3	0–4
APOP	0–1	2–0	5–0	5–1	0–4	1–0	1–1		0–0	4–0	2–3	2–1	2–0	1–2
Ethnikos Assia	3–0	3–2	3–0	0–1	1–3	0–2	3–1	1–2		1–0	2–0	1–1	2–1	0–1
Ethnikos Achna	0–2	1–2	5–1	5–0	2–3	1–0	1–3	3–1	1–1		3–1	2–0	3–3	0–1
Enosis	3–0	6–1	3–2	4–0	0–1	0–0	2–1	2–1	2–0	3–3		1–5	2–0	2–2
Nea Salamis	2–1	0–2	6–0	7–3	1–4	3–1	3–2	1–1	2–1	0–1	2–1		2–2	0–1
Olympiakos	2–2	3–3	5–0	2–1	5–2	0–2	5–3	5–0	2–2	1–0	3–5	3–1		1–3
Omonia	0–3	1–0	4–1	8–1	2–2	3–2	3–0	5–0	2–0	2–0	6–2	1–1	0–3	

Legend: Blue = home team win; Yellow = draw; Red = away team win.

== Attendances ==
#	Club	Average
1	Omonoia	4,693
2	APOEL	3,718
3	AEL	3,135
4	Anorthosis	2,832
5	Apollon Limassol	2,774
6	Olympiakos Nicosia	1,505
7	Nea Salamina	1,255
8	AEK Larnaca	1,201
9	ENP	1,152
10	Alki	743
11	AEP	721
12	Ethnikos Achnas	570
13	Anagennisi	561
14	Ethnikos Assias	552

== See also ==
- Cypriot First Division
- 1999–2000 Cypriot Cup
- List of top goalscorers in Cypriot First Division by season
- Cypriot football clubs in European competitions

== Sources ==
- "1999/2000 Cypriot First Division". Rec.Sport.Soccer Statistics Foundation. 2016-01-14.
