= 1997–98 Cypriot First Division =

Cypriot First Division
- Season: 1997–98
- Champions: Anorthosis (9th title)
- Relegated: Anagennisi; APOP; Ethnikos Assia
- Champions League: Anorthosis (1st qualifying round)
- UEFA Cup: Omonia (1st qualifying round)
- Cup Winners' Cup: Apollon (qualifying round; via Cypriot Cup)
- Intertoto Cup: Ethnikos Achna (1st round)
- Matches played: 182
- Goals scored: 657 (3.61 per match)
- Top goalscorer: Rainer Rauffmann (42 goals)

The 1997–98 Cypriot First Division was the 59th season of the Cypriot top-level football league. Anorthosis won their 9th title.

== Format ==
Fourteen teams participated in the 1997–98 Cypriot First Division. All teams played against each other twice, once at their home and once away. The team with the most points at the end of the season crowned champions. The last three teams were relegated to the 1998–99 Cypriot Second Division.

The champions ensured their participation in the 1998–99 UEFA Champions League and the runners-up in the 1998–99 UEFA Cup.

The teams had to declare their interest to participate in the 1998 UEFA Intertoto Cup before the end of the championship. At the end of the championship, the higher placed team among the interested ones participated in the Intertoto Cup (if they had not secured their participation in any other UEFA competition).

=== Point system ===
Teams received three points for a win, one point for a draw and zero points for a loss.

== Changes from previous season ==
Aris Limassol, Olympiakos Nicosia and APEP were relegated from previous season and played in the 1997–98 Cypriot Second Division. They were replaced by the first three teams of the 1996–97 Cypriot Second Division, AEL Limassol, Evagoras Paphos and Ethnikos Assia.

== Stadia and locations ==
1997–98 Cypriot First Division

Club	Venue
ΑΕΚ	GSZ Stadium
AEL	Tsirion Stadium
Alki	GSZ Stadium
Anagennisi	Anagennisi Football Ground
Anorthosis	Antonis Papadopoulos Stadium
APOEL	Makario Stadium
Apollon	Tsirion Stadium
APOP	Pafiako Stadium
Ethnikos Achna	Dasaki Stadium
Ethnikos Assia	Kykkos Stadium
Enosis	Paralimni Municipal Stadium
Evagoras	Pafiako Stadium
Nea Salamina	Ammochostos Stadium
Omonia	Makario Stadium

== League standings ==
Pos	Team	Pld	W	D	L	GF	GA	GD	Pts	Qualification or relegation
1	Anorthosis (C)	26	21	3	2	87	18	+69	66	Qualification for Champions League first qualifying round
2	Omonia	26	19	5	2	90	20	+70	62	Qualification for UEFA Cup first qualifying round
3	Apollon	26	16	7	3	50	25	+25	55	Qualification for Cup Winners' Cup qualifying round (Note: Apollon qualified to 1998–99 UEFA Cup Winners' Cup because Cypriot Cup winner, Anorthosis, already qualified to UEFA Champions League.)
4	Ethnikos Achna	26	13	8	5	35	28	+7	47	Qualification for Intertoto Cup first round
5	AEK	26	9	7	10	42	40	+2	34	
6	Enosis Neon Paralimni	26	10	3	13	45	49	−4	33	
7	APOEL	26	8	7	11	48	51	−3	31	
8	Nea Salamis	26	10	1	15	43	59	−16	31	
9	AEL	26	7	8	11	37	50	−13	29	
10	Alki	26	9	2	15	46	65	−19	29	
11	Evagoras	26	8	5	13	29	52	−23	29	
12	Anagennisi (R)	26	7	6	13	37	65	−28	27	Relegation to Cypriot Second Division
13	APOP (R)	26	7	5	14	40	59	−19	26	Relegation to Cypriot Second Division
14	Ethnikos Assia (R)	26	3	3	20	28	76	−48	12	Relegation to Cypriot Second Division

Rules for classification: 1) Points, 2) Goal differences, 3) Goals for.
(C) Champions; (R) Relegated

== Results ==
Home \ Away	AEK	AEL	ALK	ANG	ANR	APN	APL	APP	EAC	EAS	ENP	EVG	NSL	OMO
AEK		3–1	1–4	1–3	1–1	3–2	1–1	2–2	1–2	0–1	5–1	5–1	1–3	0–1
AEL	0–0		1–4	3–1	2–3	1–3	0–0	2–0	0–0	1–1	3–1	0–1	1–3	0–4
Alki	1–3	1–2		4–1	1–4	3–3	2–3	1–3	7–2	1–0	1–4	1–0	3–2	3–5
Anagennisi	2–2	0–1	1–2		0–5	1–1	0–2	1–1	4–1	3–2	1–2	1–0	2–0	0–7
Anorthosis	3–0	5–1	3–1	5–0		1–0	4–2	7–0	5–0	0–2	4–1	6–0	7–1	0–1
APOEL	0–2	3–1	4–2	3–6	0–1		2–2	1–1	1–3	1–1	2–3	2–0	5–0	0–0
Apollon	2–0	0–0	2–0	4–1	1–1	3–1		2–1	4–0	1–2	2–1	3–1	2–0	3–0
APOP	2–1	3–3	5–1	1–0	0–4	3–4	1–2		3–2	1–2	2–3	3–0	1–2	2–4
Ethnikos Assia	1–4	2–5	2–0	1–1	1–2	1–4	1–2	0–2		1–2	1–2	2–4	1–5	0–1
Ethnikos Achna	1–1	1–1	3–0	1–0	1–3	2–0	1–1	1–1	2–0		1–0	0–0	4–1	0–0
Enosis	2–0	3–3	2–2	2–3	0–2	0–2	0–1	3–0	2–1	6–1		1–1	2–3	1–3
Evagoras	2–2	2–1	1–0	2–2	0–6	4–2	1–3	1–0	2–2	1–2	1–0		2–0	1–3
Nea Salamis	1–2	1–3	0–1	2–2	0–3	6–1	2–0	2–1	3–1	0–1	2–3	3–1		0–3
Omonia	0–1	5–1	8–0	10–1	2–2	1–1	2–2	8–1	8–0	4–0	2–0	2–0	6–1	

Legend: Blue = home team win; Yellow = draw; Red = away team win.

== See also ==
- Cypriot First Division
- 1997–98 Cypriot Cup
- List of top goalscorers in Cypriot First Division by season
- Cypriot football clubs in European competitions

== Sources ==
- "1997/98 Cypriot First Division". Rec.Sport.Soccer Statistics Foundation. 2016-01-14.
