= Anorthosis Kato Polemidia =

Cypriot football club

- Founded: 1940; 85 years ago
- Website: http://anopolemidion.eu.pn/

Anorthosis Kato Polemidia is a Cypriot association football club based in Kato Polemidia, located in the Limassol District. It has 6 participations in Cypriot Fourth Division.
