= 2000–01 Cypriot Second Division =

Cypriot Second Division
- Season: 2000–01
- Champions: Alki (3rd title)
- Promoted: Alki; Ethnikos; Ermis
- Relegated: Kinyras; Rotsidis; AEK/Achilleas
- Matches played: 182
- Goals scored: 591 (3.25 per match)

The 2000–01 Cypriot Second Division was the 46th season of the Cypriot second-level football league. Alki Larnaca won their 3rd title.

== Format ==
Fourteen teams participated in the 2000–01 Cypriot Second Division. All teams played against each other twice, once at their home and once away. The team with the most points at the end of the season crowned champions. The first three teams were promoted to 2001–02 Cypriot First Division and the last three teams were relegated to the 2001–02 Cypriot Third Division.

== Changes from previous season ==
Teams promoted to 2000–01 Cypriot First Division

- Digenis Morphou
- Aris Limassol
- Doxa Katokopias

Teams relegated from 1999–2000 Cypriot First Division

- Ethnikos Assia
- Anagennisi Deryneia
- Alki Larnaca

Teams promoted from 1999–2000 Cypriot Third Division

- THOI Lakatamia
- Rotsidis Mammari
- Kinyras Empas

Teams relegated to 2000–01 Cypriot Third Division

- PAEEK FC
- Iraklis Gerolakkou

== League standings ==
Pos	Team	Pld	W	D	L	GF	GA	GD	Pts	Promotion or relegation
1	Alki Larnaca (C, P)	26	16	8	2	70	30	+40	56	Promoted to Cypriot First Division
2	Ethnikos Assia (P)	26	14	9	3	48	20	+28	51	Promoted to Cypriot First Division
3	Ermis Aradippou (P)	26	14	5	7	39	31	+8	47	Promoted to Cypriot First Division
4	Anagennisi Deryneia	26	12	5	9	44	39	+5	41	
5	THOI Lakatamia	26	12	4	10	41	36	+5	40	
6	Onisilos Sotira	26	11	6	9	48	28	+20	39	
7	Omonia Aradippou	26	10	9	7	45	39	+6	39	
8	AEZ Zakakiou	26	10	5	11	42	43	−1	35	
9	Anagennisi Germasogeias	26	8	8	10	34	48	−14	32	
10	APEP	26	9	5	12	41	63	−22	32	
11	Chalkanoras Idaliou	26	8	7	11	47	43	+4	31	
12	Kinyras Empas (R)	26	6	6	14	27	42	−15	24	Relegated to Cypriot Third Division
13	Rotsidis Mammari (R)	26	6	2	18	33	57	−24	20	Relegated to Cypriot Third Division
14	AEK/Achilleas Ayiou Theraponta (R)	26	5	3	18	32	72	−40	18	Relegated to Cypriot Third Division

Rules for classification: 1) Points, 2) Goal differences, 3) Goal for
(C) Champions; (P) Promoted; (R) Relegated

== Results ==
Home \ Away	AEZ	AEK	ALK	ANG	AND	APP	ETH	ERM	THL	KIN	OMN	ONS	RTS	CHL
AEZ Zakakiou		1–2	1–1	4–2	2–3	4–0	0–0	2–1	1–3	1–2	0–0	0–0	4–1	1–1
AEK/Achilleas Ayiou Theraponta	2–5		2–5	1–1	0–2	0–2	0–3	2–2	2–1	1–0	2–7	0–2	5–3	2–1
Alki	4–0	5–1		4–1	2–1	4–0	2–2	6–0	4–4	2–2	4–0	2–1	1–1	0–2
Anagennisi G.	0–1	2–2	1–4		5–3	1–3	0–0	0–1	1–1	2–0	3–3	1–0	3–2	1–6
Anagennisi D.	3–1	2–1	1–1	0–1		1–1	1–2	0–0	1–0	3–0	3–2	2–1	4–1	3–2
APEP	3–0	2–1	1–3	0–1	1–2		0–6	2–2	4–3	4–1	1–1	2–1	2–1	1–0
Ethnikos Assia	3–0	3–1	2–3	3–0	1–0	1–0		2–0	0–0	2–0	0–0	0–0	2–0	2–2
Ermis	1–0	5–0	0–1	2–1	4–1	1–1	1–0		2–0	3–1	0–0	2–1	2–1	2–1
ENTHOI	3–1	2–1	0–0	0–3	3–2	5–2	2–0	2–1		2–1	4–1	0–3	3–1	2–0
Kinyras	1–3	2–1	1–3	0–0	2–0	5–0	1–1	1–3	1–0		1–1	1–2	0–2	0–0
Omonia	1–2	2–0	2–2	1–1	1–1	3–0	1–5	2–3	2–0	4–1		2–0	2–1	3–0
Onisilos	1–4	7–2	2–1	5–0	1–1	8–2	2–3	3–0	1–0	0–0	3–0		2–2	0–0
Rotsidis	1–2	1–0	1–4	0–1	2–1	3–2	2–3	0–1	1–0	0–2	1–2	0–2		2–5
Chalkanoras	4–2	4–1	1–2	2–2	2–3	5–5	2–2	1–0	0–1	2–1	1–2	1–0	2–3	

Legend: Blue = home team win; Yellow = draw; Red = away team win.

== See also ==
- Cypriot Second Division
- 2000–01 Cypriot First Division
- 2000–01 Cypriot Cup

== Sources ==
- "2000/01 Cypriot Second Division". Rec.Sport.Soccer Statistics Foundation. 2016-01-14.
