= Amiantos =

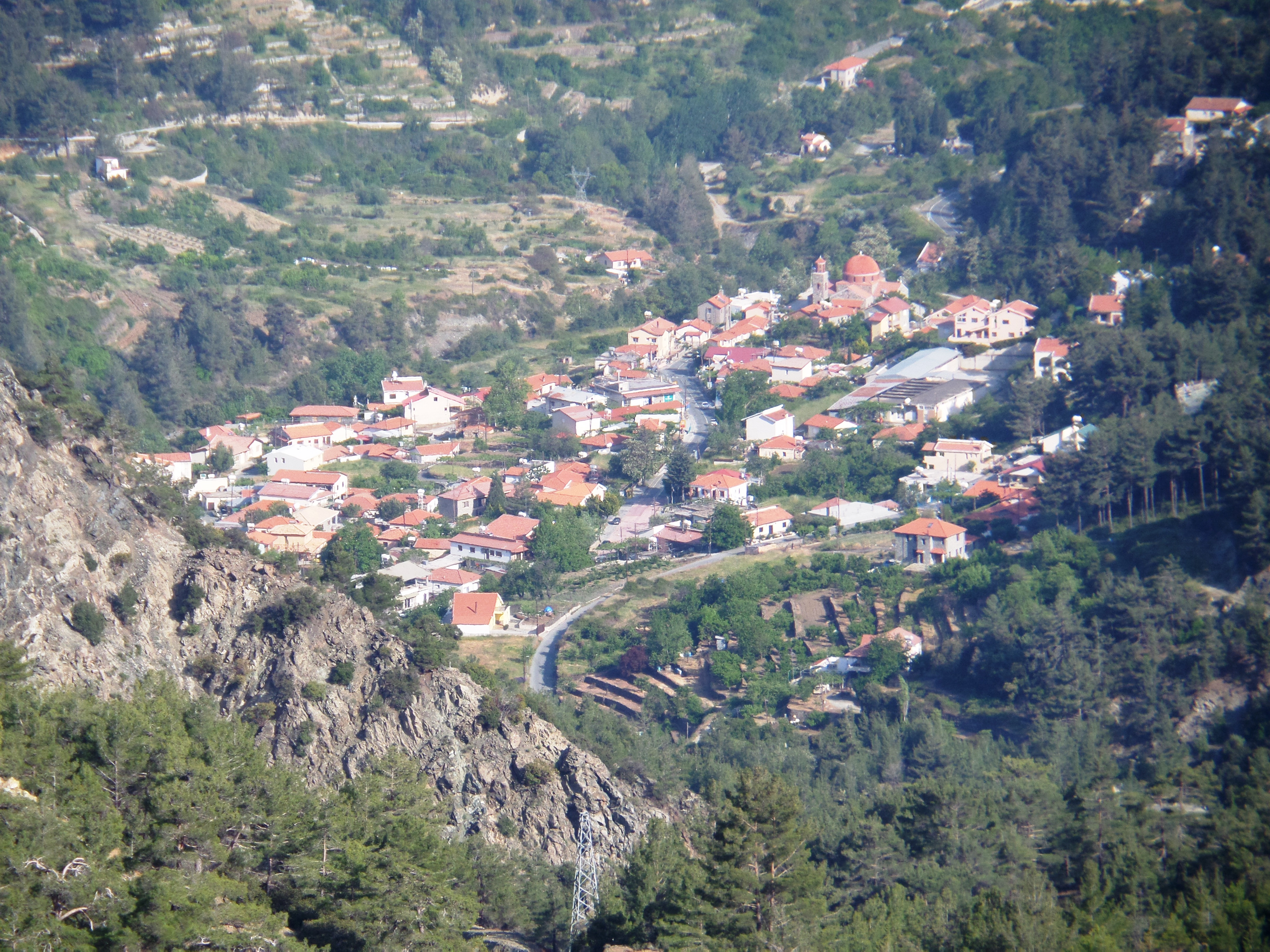

- Location within Cyprus
- Coordinates: 34°55′01″N 32°56′09″E
- Country: Cyprus
- District: Limassol District

Population (2011)
  - Total: 228
- Website: www.amiandos.org

Amiantos (Greek: Αμίαντος, Turkish: Amiyanto) is a village in the Limassol District of Cyprus, located 9 km south-west of Kyperounta.

== Pano Amiantos ==
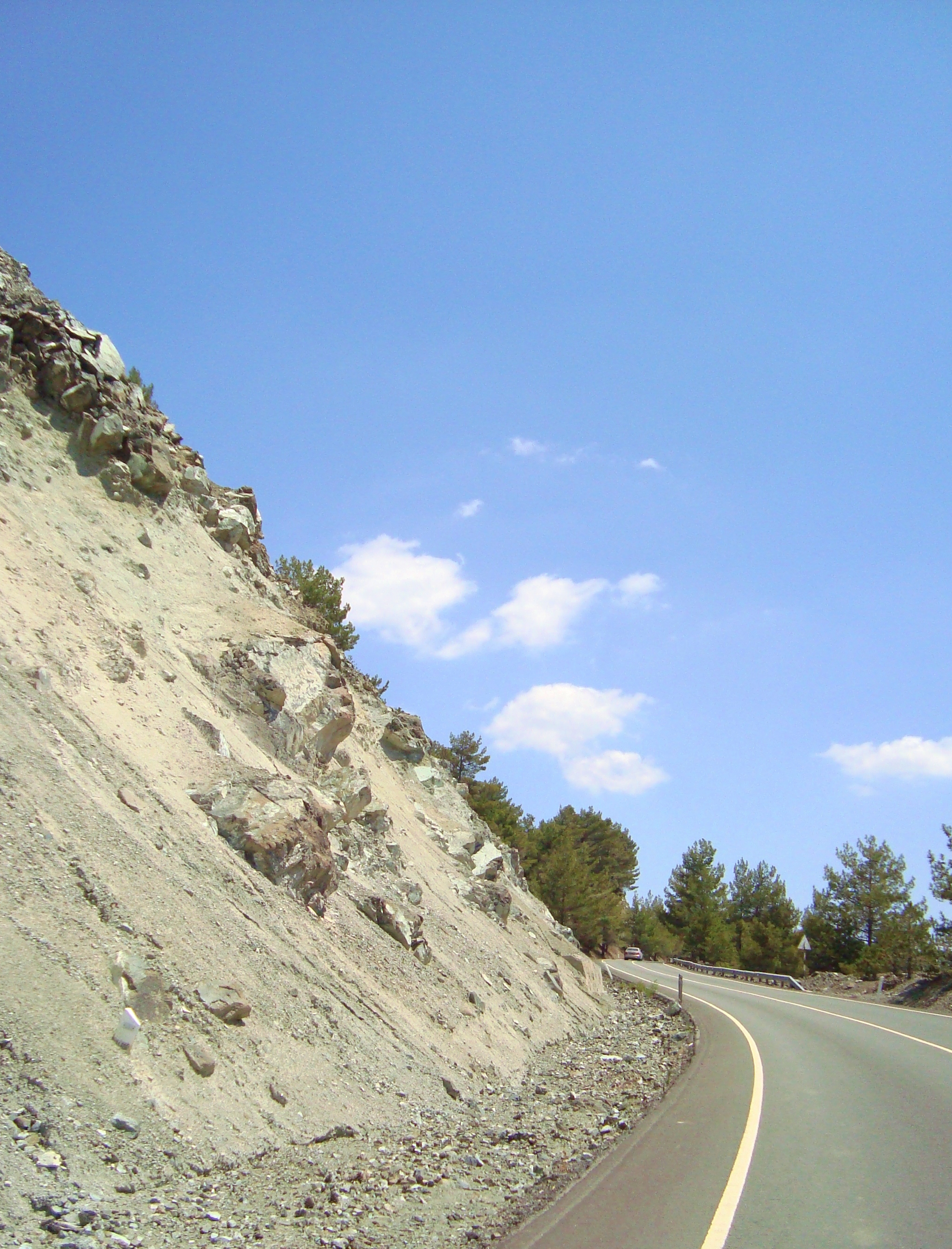
Road next to Amiantos mine

Pano Amiantos (Greek: Πάνω Αμίαντος, Turkish: Yukarı Amyanto) is a village in the Limassol District of Cyprus, located 7 km southwest of Kyperounta. Formerly the village was the site of a large asbestos mine.

When the mine closed the enormous workings were left as a blot on the landscape of the Troodos. There is now a project under way for the replanting of the workings which should eventually restore the landscape to its former beauty, if not its former shape.
