= 2000–01 Cypriot First Division =

Cypriot First Division
- Season: 2000–01
- Champions: Omonia (18th title)
- Relegated: Nea Salamina; Digenis; Aris
- Champions League: Omonia (2nd qualifying round)
- UEFA Cup: Olympiakos (qualifying round); Apollon (qualifying round; via Cypriot Cup)
- Intertoto Cup: Anorthosis (1st round)
- Matches: 182
- Goals: 646 (3.55 per match)
- Top goalscorer: Rainer Rauffmann (30 goals)

The 2000–01 Cypriot First Division was the 62nd season of the Cypriot top-level football league. Omonia won their 18th title.

== Format ==
Fourteen teams participated in the 2000–01 Cypriot First Division. All teams played against each other twice, once at their home and once away. The team with the most points at the end of the season crowned champions. The last three teams were relegated to the 2001–02 Cypriot Second Division.

The champions ensured their participation in the 2001–02 UEFA Champions League and the runners-up in the 2001–02 UEFA Cup.

The teams had to declare their interest to participate in the 2001 UEFA Intertoto Cup before the end of the championship. At the end of the championship, the higher placed team among the interested ones participated in the Intertoto Cup (if they had not secured their participation in any other UEFA competition).

=== Point system ===
Teams received three points for a win, one point for a draw and zero points for a loss.

== Changes from previous season ==
Ethnikos Assia, Anagennisi Deryneia and Alki Larnaca were relegated from previous season and played in the 2000–01 Cypriot Second Division. They were replaced by the first three teams of the 1999–2000 Cypriot Second Division, Digenis Morphou, Aris Limassol and Doxa Katokopias.

Before the start of the season, APOP Paphos and Evagoras Paphos were merged forming AEP Paphos, which took the place of APOP Paphos in the Cypriot First Division.

== Stadia and locations ==
2000–01 Cypriot First Division

Team	Stadium
AEK	GSZ Stadium
AEL	Tsirion Stadium
AEP	Pafiako Stadium
Anorthosis	Antonis Papadopoulos Stadium
APOEL	GSP Stadium
Apollon	Tsirion Stadium
Aris	Tsirion Stadium
Digenis	Kykkos Stadium
Doxa	Peristerona Stadium
Ethnikos	Dasaki Stadium
ENP	Paralimni Stadium
Nea Salamina	Ammochostos Stadium
Olympiakos	GSP Stadium
Omonia	GSP Stadium

== League standings ==
Pos	Team	Pld	W	D	L	GF	GA	GD	Pts	Qualification or relegation
1	Omonia (C)	26	17	6	3	60	27	+33	57	Qualification for Champions League second qualifying round
2	Olympiakos Nicosia	26	16	6	4	58	30	+28	54	Qualification for UEFA Cup qualifying round
3	AEL Limassol	26	15	7	4	48	28	+20	52	
4	Anorthosis Famagusta	26	15	6	5	60	32	+28	51	Qualification for Intertoto Cup first round
5	APOEL	26	12	8	6	58	37	+21	44	
6	Apollon Limassol	26	12	8	6	56	40	+16	44	Qualification for UEFA Cup qualifying round (Note: AEK Larnaca qualified for the UEFA Cup qualifying round by winning the 2000–01 Cypriot Cup.)
7	AEK Larnaca	26	9	9	8	52	47	+5	36	
8	AEP Paphos	26	8	9	9	45	53	−8	33	
9	Enosis Neon Paralimni	26	8	6	12	42	53	−11	30	
10	Doxa Katokopias	26	7	8	11	26	37	−11	29	
11	Ethnikos Achna	26	6	10	10	44	49	−5	28	
12	Nea Salamina (R)	26	7	6	13	41	47	−6	27	Relegation to Cypriot Second Division
13	Digenis Morphou (R)	26	3	2	21	28	78	−50	11	Relegation to Cypriot Second Division
14	Aris Limassol (R)	26	1	1	24	28	88	−60	4	Relegation to Cypriot Second Division

Rules for classification: 1) Points, 2) Goal differences, 3) Goals for.
(C) Champions; (R) Relegated

== Results ==
Home \ Away	AEK	AEL	AEP	ANR	APN	APL	ARS	DGN	DXK	ETH	ENP	NSL	OLM	OMN
AEK		3–2	4–1	1–1	0–2	1–1	4–2	3–2	3–0	3–3	6–1	2–3	2–2	1–4
AEL	3–3		0–1	2–1	1–0	2–0	3–1	6–1	2–1	1–0	1–0	4–1	0–5	0–0
AEP	1–1	2–5		2–3	5–5	4–3	4–0	3–1	1–1	1–1	2–2	2–0	2–2	1–2
Anorthosis	2–2	0–0	5–0		3–0	2–1	6–0	3–0	1–0	4–2	1–0	2–1	3–1	0–2
APOEL	2–0	3–5	0–1	1–0		0–2	5–2	3–0	3–0	1–1	6–0	1–1	2–2	1–0
Apollon	1–1	1–1	1–0	3–3	2–2		4–0	6–2	0–0	1–1	3–2	3–2	2–0	4–3
Aris	1–3	1–3	0–2	2–7	2–2	1–2		0–2	4–0	1–2	2–4	2–5	0–5	1–3
Digenis	1–3	1–2	1–1	1–2	0–0	1–5	3–1		2–1	3–4	1–6	0–2	0–2	2–3
Doxa	2–1	0–2	1–1	1–1	1–5	1–0	2–1	4–0		3–1	1–1	1–1	2–2	1–2
Ethnikos	2–2	1–1	2–3	1–2	2–2	2–3	6–1	1–0	1–1		2–1	1–2	1–4	1–1
ENP	3–0	0–0	4–3	1–6	2–4	3–3	2–0	2–1	0–1	2–2		3–0	1–2	0–2
Nea Salamina	1–2	2–0	1–1	1–1	1–4	0–2	2–0	7–1	0–1	1–4	0–1		3–3	1–1
Olympiakos	2–1	0–2	3–1	4–0	1–2	2–1	3–2	3–0	1–0	1–0	4–1	1–0		2–1
Omonia	2–0	0–0	5–0	3–1	3–2	4–2	4–1	5–2	1–0	4–0	0–0	4–3	1–1	

Legend: Blue = home team win; Yellow = draw; Red = away team win.

== Attendances ==
#	Club	Average
1	Omonoia	8,620
2	AEL	4,618
3	Apollon Limassol	4,023
4	APOEL	3,893
5	Anorthosis	3,420
6	Olympiakos Nicosia	2,201
7	Nea Salamina	1,946
8	AEK Larnaca	1,801
9	Doxa Katokopias	1,700
10	AEP	1,657
11	Ethnikos Achnas	1,559
12	ENP	1,165
13	Aris Limassol	1,081
14	Digenis	860

== See also ==
- Cypriot First Division
- 2000–01 Cypriot Cup
- List of top goalscorers in Cypriot First Division by season
- Cypriot football clubs in European competitions

== Sources ==
- "2000/01 Cypriot First Division". Rec.Sport.Soccer Statistics Foundation. 2016-01-14.
