= Anagennisi Prosfigon Ayiou Antoniou Lemesou =

Cypriot football club

Anagennisi Prosfygon
- Full name: Athlitikos Morfotikos Syllogos Anagennisi Prosfygon Agiou Antoniou Lemesou
- Founded: 1975; 50 years ago
- Ground: Limassol Municipality Stadium
- League: EPOL 1st Division
Home colours	Away colours	Third colours

Anagennisi Prosfigon Ayiou Antoniou Lemesou is a Cypriot association football club based in Ayios Antonios, Limassol. It has 5 participations in Cypriot Fourth Division. The team was founded by refugees who moved to Limassol after the Turkish invasion of Cyprus of 1974.
