= Paliometocho =

Palaiometocho: Παλαιομέτοχο (Greek); Balyomedoş (Turkish)
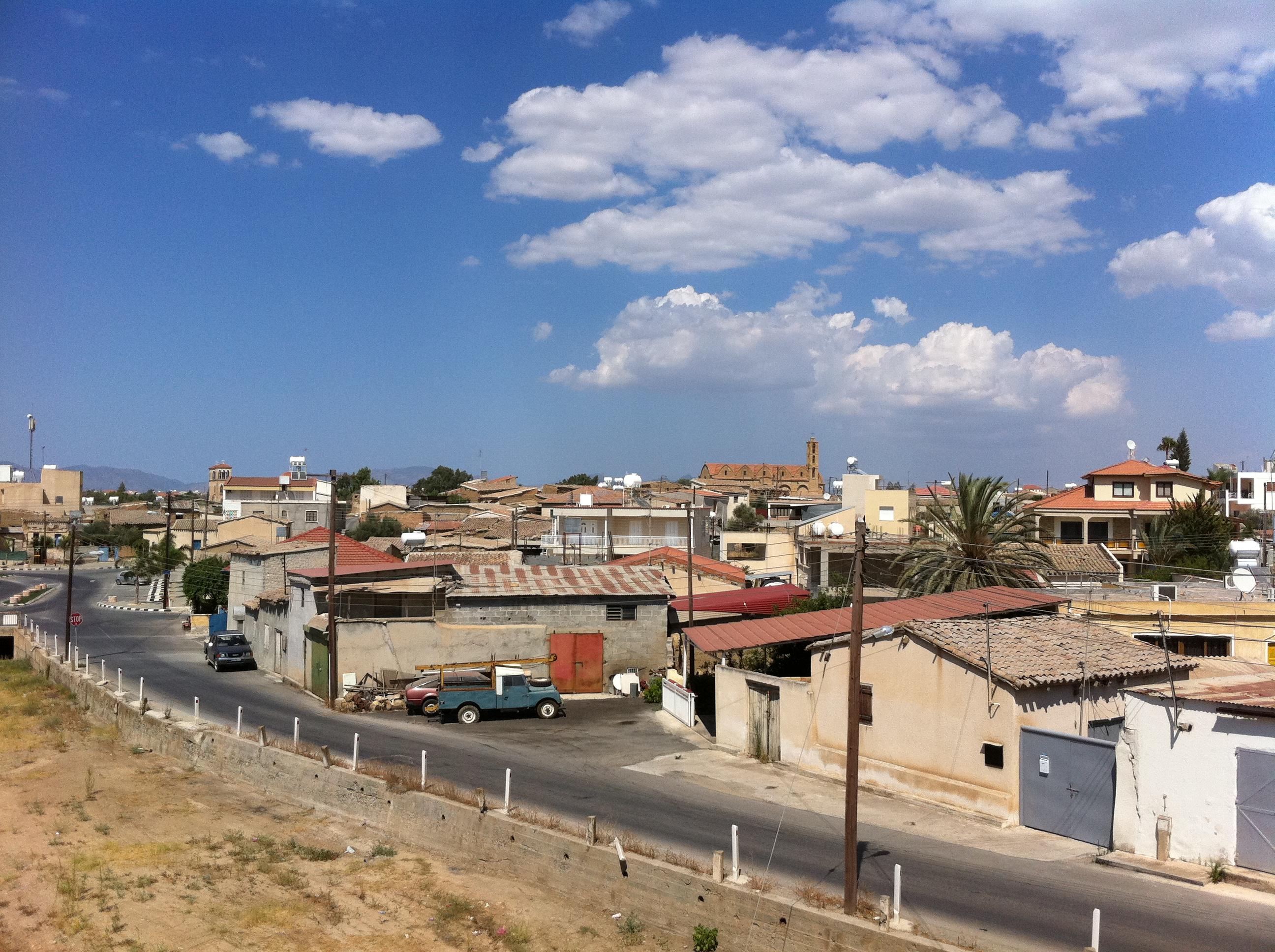

- Location in Cyprus
- Coordinates: 35°07′31″N 33°11′26″E
- Country: Cyprus
- District: Nicosia District

Government
  - Type: Community council

Population (2011)
  - Total: 4,145

Palaiometocho (Greek: Παλαιομέτοχο Greek pronunciation: [paʎoˈmetoxo], Turkish: Balyomedoş), officially Palaiometocho (Παλαιομέτοχο Greek pronunciation: [paleoˈmetoxo]), is a village in the Nicosia District of Cyprus. Its name derives from the Greek palaio (old) and metochio (inn). It was probably given to it because it used to be a rest stop for pilgrims on their way to the Kykkos Monastery. As of 2011, Palaiometocho had a population of 4,145.
