= Akaki, Cyprus =

Akaki: Ακάτζι (Greek); Akaça (Turkish)
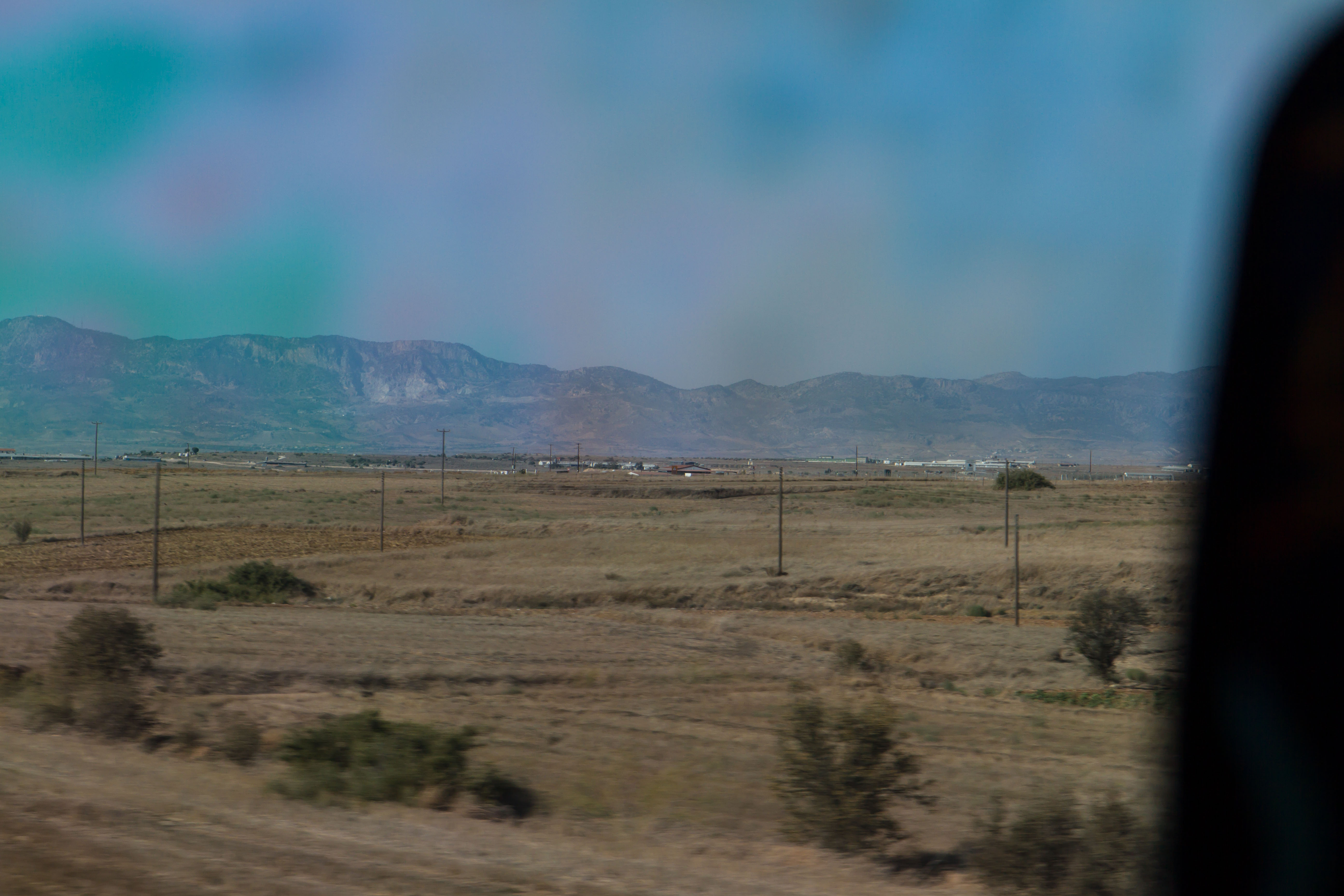

- Location in Cyprus
- Coordinates: 35°8′0″N 33°7′45″E
- Country: Cyprus
- District: Nicosia District

Population (2001)
  - Total: 2,675
- Time zone: UTC+2 (EET)
  - Summer (DST): UTC+3 (EEST)

Akaki (Greek: Ακάκι, Cypriot Dialect: Ακάτζι; Turkish: Akaça) is a village in the Nicosia District of Cyprus.

In 2016 a major find was made of a 36 ft x 13 ft mosaic floor of a Roman villa depicting horse races in a hippodrome from a 4th c. AD villa.
