= 2005–06 Cypriot Cup =

Tournament details
- Country: Cyprus
- Dates: 10 September 2005 – 13 May 2006
- Teams: 54

Final positions
- Champions: APOEL (18th title)
- Runners-up: AEK

The 2005–06 Cypriot Cup was the 64th edition of the Cypriot Cup. A total of 54 clubs entered the competition. It began on 10 September 2005 with the first round and concluded on 13 May 2006 with the final which was held at GSZ Stadium. APOEL won their 18th Cypriot Cup trophy after beating AEK 3–2 (aet) in the final.

== Format ==
In the 2005–06 Cypriot Cup, participated all the teams of the Cypriot First Division, the Cypriot Second Division, the Cypriot Third Division and 12 of the 14 teams of the Cypriot Fourth Division.

The competition consisted of seven rounds. In the first and in the second round each tie was played as a single leg and was held at the home ground of one of the two teams, according to the draw results. Each tie winner was qualifying to the next round. If a match was drawn, extra time was following. If extra time was drawn, the winner was decided by penalty shoot-out.

The third round was played in a two-legged format, each team playing a home and an away match against their opponent. The team which scored more goals on aggregate, was qualifying to the next round. If the two teams scored the same number of goals on aggregate, then the team which scored more goals away from home was advancing to the next round.

If both teams had scored the same number of home and away goals, then extra time was following after the end of the second leg match. If during the extra thirty minutes both teams had managed to score, but they had scored the same number of goals, then the team who scored the away goals was advancing to the next round (i.e. the team which was playing away). If there weren't scored any goals during extra time, the qualifying team was determined by penalty shoot-out.

In the next round, the teams were drawn into four groups of four. The teams of each group played against each other twice, once at their home and once away. The group winners and runners-up of each group advanced to the next round.

The quarter-finals and semi-finals were played over two legs and the same format as in the third round was applied. The final was a single match.

The cup winner secured a place in the 2006–07 UEFA Cup.

== First round ==
In the first round participated all the teams of the Cypriot Second Division and the Cypriot Third Division and 12 of the 14 teams of the Cypriot Fourth Division. The two fourth division teams which were promoted from the 2005 STOK promotion play-offs to the 2005–06 Cypriot Fourth Division after finishing to the third and fourth place (APEP Pelendriou and Anagennisi Trachoni) did not participate in the Cypriot Cup. FC Episkopi and Kissos Kissonerga which finished first and second in the 2005 STOK promotion play-offs, participated in the Cypriot Cup.

Team 1	Score	Team 2
Spartakos Kitiou (D)	1–1 (5–3 p)	FC Episkopi (D)
Digenis Oroklinis (C)	0–3	Omonia Aradippou (B)
Frenaros FC 2000 (C)	2–0	Onisilos Sotira (B)
Anagennisi Deryneia (B)	1–3	Aris Limassol F.C. (B)
Ellinismos Akakiou (D)	0–3	AEK Kythreas (C)
ENAD Polis Chrysochous FC (C)	2–1	Akritas Chlorakas (C)
PAEEK (C)	5–1	SEK Agiou Athanasiou (B)
Olympos Xylofagou (D)	1–4	ASIL Lysi (C)
Ayia Napa F.C. (B)	5–2	Iraklis Gerolakkou (B)
(C) Atromitos Yeroskipou	3–0	Ethnikos Latsion (D)
(C) Enosis Kokkinotrimithia	0–0 (3–1 p)	Alki Larnaca F.C. (B)
Ethnikos Assia F.C. (B)	0–2	MEAP Nisou (B)
Achyronas Liopetriou (C)	1–3 (a.e.t.)	Chalkanoras Idaliou (B)
Othellos Athienou F.C. (D)	1–2	Kissos Kissonergas (D)
Anagennisi Germasogeias (D)	2–1	Ermis Aradippou (C)
Elia Lythrodonta (D)	1–2	AOL Omonia Lakatamias (D)
Sourouklis Troullon (D)	1–2	Orfeas Nicosia (D)
AEP Paphos FC (B)	2–1	Elpida Xylofagou (B)
AEM Mesogis (C)	3–0	AEZ Zakakiou (C)
Doxa Katokopias F.C. (B)	1–2 (a.e.t.)	Adonis Idaliou (C)

== Second round ==
In the second round participated the winners of the first round ties.

Team 1	Score	Team 2
Orfeas Nicosia (D)	1–2	Omonia Aradippou (B)
MEAP Nisou (B)	2–3 (a.e.t.)	Ayia Napa F.C. (B)
Aris Limassol F.C. (B)	9–1	AOL Omonia Lakatamias (D)
Frenaros FC 2000 (C)	4–3 (a.e.t.)	Anagennisi Germasogeias (D)
Chalkanoras Idaliou (B)	1–3	AEP Paphos FC (B)
AEK Kythreas (C)	0–2	PAEEK (C)
ENAD Polis Chrysochous FC (C)	0–1	AEM Mesogis (C)
Enosis Kokkinotrimithia (C)	1–0	Adonis Idaliou (C)
ASIL Lysi (C)	1–0	Atromitos Yeroskipou (C)
Spartakos Kitiou (D)	2–1	Kissos Kissonerga (D)

== Third round ==
In the third round participated the winners of the second round ties and six teams of the Cypriot First Division (the teams which finished 9th, 10th, 11th in the 2004–05 Cypriot First Division and the three teams which promoted from the 2004–05 Cypriot Second Division). The first eight teams of the 2004-05 Cypriot First Division did not participate in this round.

Team 1	Agg.	Team 2	1st leg	2nd leg
AEM Mesogis (C)	4–4 (a)	ASIL Lysi (C)	3–3	1–1
AEP Paphos FC (B)	7–2	Spartakos Kitiou (D)	4–1	3–1
Ethnikos Achna FC (A)	3–1	APOP Kinyras FC (A)	1–1	2–0
APEP F.C. (A)	7–3	PAEEK (C)	6–2	1–1
Enosis Kokkinotrimithia (C)	0–12	AEL Limassol (A)	0–4	0–8
Ayia Napa F.C. (B)	1–3	AEK Larnaca F.C. (A)	1–1	0–2
Aris Limassol F.C. (B)	11–1	Omonia Aradippou (B)	4–0	7–1
ENTHOI Lakatamia FC (A)	6–1	Frenaros FC 2000 (C)	5–0	1–1

== Group stage ==
In the group stage participated the eight winners of the third round ties and the eight teams of the 2005–06 Cypriot First Division which did not participated in the third round, that were the teams which finished in the first eight places in the 2004–05 Cypriot First Division. The first four teams of the 2004–05 Cypriot First Division (Anorthosis, APOEL, Omonia, Olympiakos) were set heads of each group and the 5th–8th placed teams (Digenis, Nea Salamina, Apollon and Enosis Neon Paralimni) were drawn one per group. The eight teams which advanced from the third round were drawn without limitations.

The teams of each group played against each other twice, once at their home and once away. The group winners and runners-up of each group advanced to the next round.

=== Group A ===
Final table
Pos	Team	Pld	W	D	L	GF	GA	GD	Pts	Qualification
1	Anorthosis (A)	6	4	2	0	11	2	+9	14	Advanced to Quarter-Finals
2	AEP Paphos (B)	6	3	2	1	7	3	+4	11	Advanced to Quarter-Finals
3	Digenis Morphou (A)	6	1	3	2	4	6	−2	6	
4	THOI Lakatamia (A)	6	0	1	5	3	14	−11	1	

Rules for classification: 1) Points; 2) Head-to-head points; 3) Head-to-head goal difference; 4) Head-to-head away goals scored; 5) Goal difference; 6) Goals scored.

Results
Home \ Away	ANR	AEP	DGN	THL
Anorthosis		1–0	3–1	5–0
AEP Paphos	0–0		0–0	4–2
Digenis Morphou	1–1	0–1		2–1
THOI Lakatamia	0–1	0–2	0–0	

Legend: Blue = home team win; Yellow = draw; Red = away team win.

=== Group B ===
Final table
Pos	Team	Pld	W	D	L	GF	GA	GD	Pts	Qualification
1	APOEL (A)	6	5	0	1	17	9	+8	15	Advanced to Quarter-Finals
2	Apollon Limassol (A)	6	4	1	1	21	10	+11	13	Advanced to Quarter-Finals
3	APEP (A)	6	1	2	3	10	16	−6	5	
4	ASIL Lysi (C)	6	0	1	5	8	21	−13	1	

Rules for classification: 1) Points; 2) Head-to-head points; 3) Head-to-head goal difference; 4) Head-to-head away goals scored; 5) Goal difference; 6) Goals scored.

Results
Home \ Away	APN	APL	APP	ASL
APOEL		3–1	3–1	2–1
Apollon Limassol	3–2		5–2	5–0
APEP	1–4	1–1		2–2
ASIL Lysi	2–3	2–6	1–3	

Legend: Blue = home team win; Yellow = draw; Red = away team win.

=== Group C ===
Final table
Pos	Team	Pld	W	D	L	GF	GA	GD	Pts	Qualification
1	Olympiakos Nicosia (A)	6	4	1	1	9	5	+4	13 (Note: Olympiakos 4-1 Nea Salamina; Nea Salamina 2-0 Olympiakos)	Advanced to Quarter-Finals
2	Nea Salamina (A)	6	4	1	1	15	9	+6	13	Advanced to Quarter-Finals
3	AEL Limassol (A)	6	1	2	3	11	14	−3	5	
4	Ethnikos Achna (A)	6	1	0	5	6	13	−7	3	

Rules for classification: 1) Points; 2) Head-to-head points; 3) Head-to-head goal difference; 4) Head-to-head away goals scored; 5) Goal difference; 6) Goals scored.
Notes:

Results
Home \ Away	OLM	NSL	AEL	ETH
Olympiakos Nicosia		4–1	2–1	1–0
Nea Salamina	2–0		4–2	3–0
AEL Limassol	1–1	2–2		1–4
Ethnikos Achna	0–1	1–3	1–4	

Legend: Blue = home team win; Yellow = draw; Red = away team win.

=== Group D ===
Final table
Pos	Team	Pld	W	D	L	GF	GA	GD	Pts	Qualification
1	Omonia (A)	6	5	0	1	14	3	+11	15	Advanced to Quarter-Finals
2	AEK Larnaca (A)	6	3	0	3	8	8	0	9 (Note: AEK 4-3 ENP; ENP 0-1 AEK)	Advanced to Quarter-Finals
3	Enosis Neon Paralimni (A)	6	3	0	3	10	9	+1	9	
4	Aris Limassol (B)	6	1	0	5	4	16	−12	3	

Rules for classification: 1) Points; 2) Head-to-head points; 3) Head-to-head goal difference; 4) Head-to-head away goals scored; 5) Goal difference; 6) Goals scored.
Notes:

Results
Home \ Away	OMN	AEK	ENP	ARS
Omonia		1–0	2–1	7–0
AEK Larnaca	1–2		4–3	2–1
Enosis Neon Paralimni	1–0	0–1		3–2
Aris Limassol	0–2	1–0	0–2	

Legend: Blue = home team win; Yellow = draw; Red = away team win.

== Quarter-finals ==
In the quarter-finals participated all the teams which qualified from the group stage. The group winners were drawn against the runners-up, with the group winners hosting the second leg. Teams from the same group could not be drawn against each other.

The first legs were played on 7 and 8 March. The second legs were played on 31 March, 1 April and 2 April. The second leg match between Anorthosis and AEK was abandoned in the 55th minute due to floodlight failure and was replayed on 19 April.

Team 1	Agg.	Team 2	1st leg	2nd leg
Nea Salamina	2–5	APOEL	2–1	0–4
Apollon Limassol	0–2	Omonia	0–2	0–0
AEK Larnaca	3–3	Anorthosis	2–0	1–3
AEP Paphos	3–2	Olympiakos	2–0	1–2

== Semi-finals ==
The first legs were played on 26 April. The second legs were played on 3 May.

Team 1	Agg.	Team 2	1st leg	2nd leg
Omonia	4–6	APOEL	3–3	1–3
AE Paphos	1–1	AEK Larnaca	1–1	0–0

== Final ==
13 May 2006
20:00 EEST

APOEL	3–2 (a.e.t.)	AEK Larnaca
Neophytou 15' (pen.); Kaklamanos 17'; Jovanović 107'	Report	Ceesay 19'; Răducan 42' (pen.)

Neo GSZ Stadium, Larnaca
Attendance: 10,500
Referee: (Cyprus) Stelios Tryfonos

APOEL:
GK	1	(Cyprus) Michalis Morfis (c)
DF	19	(Cyprus) Marios Elia (yellow card)
DF	3	(Togo) Jean-Paul Abalo
DF	21	(North Macedonia) Aleksandar Todorovski (substituted off) 91'
DF	18	(Cyprus) Demetris Daskalakis
MF	17	(Cyprus) Marinos Satsias
MF	33	(Cyprus) Chrysis Michael
FW	20	(Cyprus) Nektarios Alexandrou	(substituted off) 76' (yellow card)
MF	10	(Portugal) Ricardo Fernandes
FW	9	(Greece) Alexandros Kaklamanos
FW	99	(Cyprus) Marios Neophytou (substituted off) 59' (yellow card)
Substitutes:
FW	29	(Argentina) Esteban Solari	(substituted on) 59'
FW	5	(Serbia and Montenegro) Sasa Jovanovic	(substituted on) 76'
DF	6	(Cyprus) Stelios Okkarides	(substituted on) 91'
Manager:
(Poland) Jerzy Engel

AEK Larnaca:
GK	40	(Cyprus) Panayiotis Kythreotis
DF	23	(Cyprus) Constantinos Mina
DF	21	(Cyprus) Paraskevas Christou
DF	3	(Portugal) Zé Nando (yellow card)
MF	22	(Greece) Charalambos Siligardakis (yellow card)
MF	4	(Nigeria) Azubuike Oliseh (yellow card)
MF	7	(The Gambia) Jatto Ceesay	(substituted off) 87'
MF	8	(Romania) Narcis Răducan (c)
MF	11	(Cyprus) Kyriacos Pavlou	(substituted off) 76'
MF	10	(Senegal) Ismail Ba	(substituted off) 105' (yellow card)
FW	9	(Nigeria) George Datoru
Substitutes:
MF	20	(Cyprus) Christos Panagiotou	(substituted on) 76' (yellow card)
MF	27	(Portugal) Pedro Moita	(substituted on) 87'
MF	25	(Cyprus) Savvas Christou	(substituted on) 105'
Manager:
(Cyprus) Marios Constantinou

MATCH OFFICIALS

- Assistant referees:
  - Aristidis Christou
  - Stefanos Grigoriades

MATCH RULES

- 90 minutes.
- 30 minutes of extra-time if necessary.
- Penalty shoot-out if scores still level.
- Five named substitutes.
- Maximum of three substitutions.

Cypriot Cup 2005–06 winners

18th title

== See also ==
- Cypriot Cup
- 2005–06 Cypriot First Division

== Sources ==
- "2005/06 Cyprus Cup". Rec.Sport.Soccer Statistics Foundation. 14 January 2016.
- Papamoiseos, Stelios (2013). Από την ενοποίηση... στα αστέρια [From unification... to the stars] (in Greek). Nicosia: The writer. pp. 138–139.
