= 2006–07 Cypriot Cup =

Tournament details
- Country: Cyprus
- Dates: 16 September 2006 – 12 May 2007
- Teams: 54

Final positions
- Champions: Anorthosis (10th title)
- Runners-up: Omonia

The 2006–07 Cypriot Cup was the 65th edition of the Cypriot Cup. A total of 54 clubs entered the competition. It began on 16 September 2006 with the first round and concluded on 12 May 2007 with the final which was held at GSP Stadium. Anorthosis won their 10th Cypriot Cup trophy after beating Omonia 3–2 in the final.

== Format ==
In the 2006–07 Cypriot Cup, participated all the teams of the Cypriot First Division, the Cypriot Second Division, the Cypriot Third Division and 12 of the 14 teams of the Cypriot Fourth Division.

The competition consisted of seven rounds. In the first and in the second round each tie was played as a single leg and was held at the home ground of one of the two teams, according to the draw results. Each tie winner was qualifying to the next round. If a match was drawn, extra time was following. If extra time was drawn, the winner was decided by penalty shoot-out.

The third and fourth round were played in a two-legged format, each team playing a home and an away match against their opponent. The team which scored more goals on aggregate, was qualifying to the next round. If the two teams scored the same number of goals on aggregate, then the team which scored more goals away from home was advancing to the next round.

If both teams had scored the same number of home and away goals, then extra time was following after the end of the second leg match. If during the extra thirty minutes both teams had managed to score, but they had scored the same number of goals, then the team who scored the away goals was advancing to the next round (i.e. the team which was playing away). If there weren't scored any goals during extra time, the qualifying team was determined by penalty shoot-out.

In the next round (quarter-finals), the teams were drawn into two groups of four. The teams of each group played against each other twice, once at their home and once away. The group winners and runners-up of each group advanced to the semi-finals.

The semi-finals were played over two legs and the same format as in the third and fourth round was applied. The final was a single match.

The cup winner secured a place in the 2007–08 UEFA Cup.

== First round ==
In the first round participated all the teams of the Cypriot Second Division and the Cypriot Third Division and 12 of the 14 teams of the Cypriot Fourth Division. The two fourth division teams which were promoted from the 2006 STOK promotion play-offs to the 2006–07 Cypriot Fourth Division after finishing to the second and third place (Enosis Neon Parekklisia F.C. and Thiella Dromolaxia) did not participate in the Cypriot Cup. AEK Kouklia F.C. which finished first in the 2006 STOK promotion play-offs, participated in the Cypriot Cup.

| Team 1 | Score | Team 2 |
|---|---|---|
| Alki Larnaca F.C. (B) | 1–3 (a.e.t.) | Adonis Idaliou (C) |
| Anagennisi Deryneia (B) | 4–1 | Ethnikos Assia F.C. (C) |
| Onisilos Sotira (B) | 2–0 | AEM Mesogis (B) |
| APEP Pelendriou (D) | 2–1 | AOL Omonia Lakatamias (D) |
| AEK Kouklia F.C. (D) | 1–2 | Elpida Xylofagou (C) |
| AEZ Zakakiou (C) | 4–0 | Orfeas Nicosia (D) |
| Enosis Kokkinotrimithia (D) | 2–1 | ENAD Polis Chrysochous FC (C) |
| Doxa Katokopias F.C. (B) | 2–0 | ENTHOI Lakatamia FC (B) |
| Olympos Xylofagou (C) | 3–1 | Iraklis Gerolakkou (B) |
| SEK Agiou Athanasiou (C) | 1–0 | Othellos Athienou F.C. (D) |
| FC Episkopi (C) | 4–0 | Omonia Aradippou (B) |
| Achyronas Liopetriou (D) | 3–0 | Ethnikos Latsion (D) |
| ASIL Lysi (B) | 3–1 | Chalkanoras Idaliou (B) |
| Atromitos Yeroskipou (C) | 3–0 | AEK Kythreas (D) |
| APOP Kinyras FC (B) | 5–0 | Anagennisi Germasogeias (C) |
| MEAP Nisou (B) | 6–2 | Spartakos Kitiou (D) |
| Digenis Oroklinis (C) | 1–2 | Akritas Chlorakas (B) |
| PAEEK FC (C) | 2–3 (a.e.t.) | APEP F.C. (B) |
| Ermis Aradippou (C) | 3–2 | Anagennisi Trachoni (D) |
| Frenaros FC 2000 (C) | 3–2 | Sourouklis Troullon (D) |

== Second round ==
In the second round participated the winners of the first round ties.

| Team 1 | Score | Team 2 |
|---|---|---|
| Adonis Idaliou (C) | 6–2 | Anagennisi Deryneia (B) |
| APEP F.C. (B) | 1–0 (a.e.t.) | SEK Agiou Athanasiou (C) |
| Achyronas Liopetriou (D) | 5–1 | Enosis Kokkinotrimithia (D) |
| Frenaros FC 2000 (C) | 0–3 | AEZ Zakakiou (C) |
| Akritas Chlorakas (B) | 1–0 | Doxa Katokopias F.C. (B) |
| FC Episkopi (C) | 1–2 | MEAP Nisou (B) |
| Onisilos Sotira (B) | 2–1 (a.e.t.) | APOP Kinyras FC (B) |
| Olympos Xylofagou (C) | 0–3 | ASIL Lysi (B) |
| Ermis Aradippou (C) | 0–1 | Elpida Xylofagou (C) |
| Atromitos Yeroskipou (C) | 9–1 | APEP Pelendriou (D) |

== Third round ==
In the third round participated the winners of the second round ties and six teams of the Cypriot First Division (the teams which finished 9th, 10th, 11th in the 2005–06 Cypriot First Division and the three teams which promoted from the 2005–06 Cypriot Second Division). The first eight teams of the 2005–06 Cypriot First Division did not participate in this round.

| Team 1 | Agg. | Team 2 | 1st leg | 2nd leg |
|---|---|---|---|---|
| ASIL Lysi (B) | 2–3 | Onisilos Sotira (B) | 0–1 | 2–2 |
| Elpida Xylofagou (C) | 2–3 | Achyronas Liopetriou (D) | 1–1 | 1–2 (a.e.t.) |
| Atromitos Yeroskipou (C) | 0–4 | Aris Limassol F.C. (A) | 0–4 | 0–0 |
| Digenis Akritas Morphou (A) | 3–1 | APEP F.C. (B) | 2–0 | 1–1 |
| AEZ Zakakiou (C) | 1–4 | Ayia Napa F.C. (A) | 0–3 | 1–1 |
| Ethnikos Achna FC (A) | 5–2 | Olympiakos Nicosia (A) | 3–0 | 2–2 |
| Adonis Idaliou (C) | 3–9 | AEP Paphos F.C. (A) | 3–2 | 0–7 |
| MEAP Nisou (B) | 7–0 | Akritas Chlorakas (B) | 2–0 | 5–0 |

== Fourth round ==
In the fourth round participated the winners of the third round ties and the eight teams of the 2006–07 Cypriot First Division which did not participated in the third round, that were the teams which finished in the first eight places in the 2005–06 Cypriot First Division.

| Team 1 | Agg. | Team 2 | 1st leg | 2nd leg |
|---|---|---|---|---|
| Enosis Neon Paralimni FC (A) | 5–0 | Achyronas Liopetriou (D) | 3–0 | 2–0 |
| APOEL FC (A) | 4–1 | Aris Limassol F.C. (A) | 2–1 | 2–0 |
| Onisilos Sotira (B) | 1–9 | AC Omonia (A) | 0–3 | 1–6 |
| Anorthosis Famagusta FC (A) | 5–1 | AEP Paphos F.C. (A) | 3–0 | 2–1 |
| Ayia Napa F.C. (A) | 1–2 | Apollon Limassol (A) | 0–1 | 1–1 |
| AEL Limassol (A) | 5–3 | MEAP Nisou (B) | 3–0 | 2–3 |
| Ethnikos Achna FC (A) | 3–2 | Nea Salamis Famagusta FC (A) | 2–0 | 1–2 (a.e.t.) |
| AEK Larnaca F.C. (A) | 2–0 | Digenis Akritas Morphou (A) | 0–0 | 2–0 (a.e.t.) |

== Group stage (quarter-finals) ==
In the group stage participated the eight winners of the fourth round ties. The teams of each group played against each other twice, once at their home and once away. The group winners and runners-up of each group advanced to the next round.

=== Group A ===
Final table
| Pos | Team | Pld | W | D | L | GF | GA | GD | Pts | Qualification |
|---|---|---|---|---|---|---|---|---|---|---|
| 1 | APOEL (A) | 6 | 3 | 1 | 2 | 5 | 2 | +3 | 10 | Advanced to Semi-Finals |
| 2 | Anorthosis (A) | 6 | 2 | 3 | 1 | 8 | 7 | +1 | 9 | Advanced to Semi-Finals |
| 3 | Enosis Neon Paralimni (A) | 6 | 2 | 2 | 2 | 5 | 7 | −2 | 8 | |
| 4 | Apollon Limassol (A) | 6 | 0 | 4 | 2 | 6 | 8 | −2 | 4 | |

Rules for classification: 1) Points; 2) Head-to-head points; 3) Head-to-head goal difference; 4) Head-to-head away goals scored; 5) Goal difference; 6) Goals scored.

Results
| Home \ Away | APN | ANR | ENP | APL |
|---|---|---|---|---|
| APOEL | | 2–0 | 2–0 | 0–0 |
| Anorthosis | 1–0 | | 0–0 | 2–2 |
| Enosis Neon Paralimni | 1–0 | 1–3 | | 1–1 |
| Apollon Limassol | 0–1 | 2–2 | 1–2 | |

Legend: Blue = home team win; Yellow = draw; Red = away team win.

=== Group B ===
Final table
| Pos | Team | Pld | W | D | L | GF | GA | GD | Pts | Qualification |
|---|---|---|---|---|---|---|---|---|---|---|
| 1 | Omonia (A) | 6 | 4 | 1 | 1 | 10 | 4 | +6 | 13 | Advanced to Semi-Finals |
| 2 | AEK Larnaca (A) | 6 | 3 | 1 | 2 | 7 | 7 | 0 | 10 | Advanced to Semi-Finals |
| 3 | Ethnikos Achna (A) | 6 | 2 | 2 | 2 | 9 | 11 | −2 | 8 | |
| 4 | AEL Limassol (A) | 6 | 0 | 2 | 4 | 6 | 10 | −4 | 2 | |

Rules for classification: 1) Points; 2) Head-to-head points; 3) Head-to-head goal difference; 4) Head-to-head away goals scored; 5) Goal difference; 6) Goals scored.

Results
| Home \ Away | OMN | AEK | ETH | AEL |
|---|---|---|---|---|
| Omonia | | 1–2 | 2–1 | 1–1 |
| AEK Larnaca | 0–2 | | 1–1 | 2–1 |
| Ethnikos Achna | 0–3 | 2–1 | | 3–3 |
| AEL Limassol | 0–1 | 0–1 | 1–2 | |

Legend: Blue = home team win; Yellow = draw; Red = away team win.

== Semi-finals ==
In the semi-finals participated the four teams which qualified from the group stage. The first legs were played on April 11 and the second legs on April 25.

| Team 1 | Agg. | Team 2 | 1st leg | 2nd leg |
|---|---|---|---|---|
| Omonia | 3–2 | APOEL | 1–1 | 2–1 |
| AEK Larnaca | 2–3 | Anorthosis | 1–2 | 1–1 |

== Final ==
12 May 2007
19:30 EEST

| Anorthosis | 3–2 | Omonia |
|---|---|---|
| Frousos 29'; Soares 60'; Nicolaou 75' | | Weisheimer 20'; Constanti 50' |

GSP Stadium, Nicosia
Attendance: 21,030
Referee: Panayiotis Gerasimou

Cypriot Cup 2006-07 winners

10th title

== Sources ==
- "2006/07 Cyprus Cup". Rec.Sport.Soccer Statistics Foundation. 2016-01-14.
- Papamoiseos, Stelios (2013). Από την ενοποίηση... στα αστέρια [From unification... to the stars] (in Greek). Nicosia: The writer. pp. 142–143.

== See also ==
- Cypriot Cup
- 2006–07 Cypriot First Division
