= 2006–07 Cypriot Fourth Division =

Cypriot Fourth Division
- Season: 2006–07
- Champions: Spartakos (1st title)
- Promoted: Spartakos; AEK Kouklia; Anagennisi
- Relegated: AEK Kythreas; AOL/Omonia; Thiella
- Matches played: 182
- Goals scored: 537 (2.95 per match)

The 2006–07 Cypriot Fourth Division was the 22nd season of the Cypriot fourth-level football league. Spartakos Kitiou won their 1st title.

== Format ==
Fourteen teams participated in the 2006–07 Cypriot Fourth Division. All teams played against each other twice, once at their home and once away. The team with the most points at the end of the season crowned champions. The first three teams were promoted to the 2007–08 Cypriot Third Division and the last three teams were relegated to regional leagues.

=== Point system ===
Teams received three points for a win, one point for a draw and zero points for a loss.

== Changes from previous season ==
Teams promoted to 2006–07 Cypriot Third Division

- Anagennisi Germasogeias
- Olympos Xylofagou
- FC Episkopi

Teams relegated from 2005–06 Cypriot Third Division

- Achyronas Liopetriou
- Enosis Kokkinotrimithia
- AEK Kythreas

Teams promoted from regional leagues

- AEK Kouklia
- AMEP Parekklisia^{1}
- Thyella Dromolaxia

^{1}AMEP Parekklisia (after their promotion) merged with ATE PEK Parekklisias to form Enosis Neon Parekklisia

Teams relegated to regional leagues

- Kissos Kissonerga
- Elia Lythrodonta
- Ellinismos Akakiou

== League standings ==
| Pos | Team | Pld | W | D | L | GF | GA | GD | Pts | Promotion or relegation |
|---|---|---|---|---|---|---|---|---|---|---|
| 1 | Spartakos Kitiou (C, P) | 26 | 17 | 6 | 3 | 58 | 19 | +39 | 57 | Promoted to Cypriot Third Division |
| 2 | AEK Kouklia (P) | 26 | 14 | 9 | 3 | 44 | 26 | +18 | 51 | Promoted to Cypriot Third Division |
| 3 | Anagennisi Trachoniou (P) | 26 | 14 | 8 | 4 | 53 | 32 | +21 | 50 | Promoted to Cypriot Third Division |
| 4 | APEP Pelendriou | 26 | 14 | 5 | 7 | 44 | 33 | +11 | 47 | |
| 5 | Achyronas Liopetriou | 26 | 10 | 8 | 8 | 48 | 35 | +13 | 38 | |
| 6 | Enosis Kokkinotrimithia | 26 | 11 | 4 | 11 | 37 | 36 | +1 | 37 | |
| 7 | Othellos Athienou | 26 | 10 | 5 | 11 | 39 | 41 | −2 | 35 | |
| 8 | Orfeas Nicosia | 26 | 10 | 4 | 12 | 45 | 48 | −3 | 34 | |
| 9 | Ethnikos Latsion FC | 26 | 10 | 3 | 13 | 35 | 45 | −10 | 33 | |
| 10 | Sourouklis Troullon | 26 | 8 | 8 | 10 | 44 | 44 | 0 | 32 (Note: Sourouklis 4p; ENP 1p) | |
| 11 | Enosis Neon Parekklisia | 26 | 9 | 5 | 12 | 29 | 34 | −5 | 32 | |
| 12 | AEK Kythreas (R) | 26 | 7 | 9 | 10 | 23 | 34 | −11 | 30 | Relegated to regional leagues |
| 13 | AOL/Omonia Lakatamias (R) | 26 | 7 | 8 | 11 | 34 | 51 | −17 | 29 | Relegated to regional leagues |
| 14 | Thiella Dromolaxia (Note: Thiella Dromolaxia withdrew after 10th round, and all their remaining matches were awarded 0–2 to their opponents.) (R) | 26 | 0 | 0 | 26 | 4 | 59 | −55 | 0 | Relegated to regional leagues |

Rules for classification: 1) points; 2) head-to-head points; 3) head-to-head goal difference; 4) head-to-head away goals scored; 5) goal difference; 6) number of goals scored.
(C) Champions; (P) Promoted; (R) Relegated

== Results ==
| Home \ Away | AKL | AKT | ANT | AOL | APP | ACL | ETN | ENK | ENP | TDR (Note: Thiella Dromolaxia withdrew after 10th round, all their remaining matches are awarded 0–2 against them.) | OTL | ORF | SRK | SPR |
|---|---|---|---|---|---|---|---|---|---|---|---|---|---|---|
| AEK Kouklia | | 3–0 | 0–1 | 2–1 | 3–2 | 2–2 | 2–2 | 1–0 | 1–0 | 2–0 | 2–1 | 3–0 | 3–2 | 1–0 |
| AEK Kythreas | 1–1 | | 1–0 | 0–0 | 1–1 | 1–0 | 0–1 | 0–3 | 0–0 | 2–0 | 2–1 | 0–2 | 1–1 | 0–2 |
| Anagennisi Tr. | 2–2 | 2–1 | | 2–3 | 4–2 | 4–2 | 2–0 | 3–2 | 4–1 | 2–0 | 2–0 | 1–1 | 3–2 | 1–1 |
| AOL Omonia | 1–3 | 2–2 | 0–0 | | 3–3 | 3–1 | 0–1 | 1–4 | 1–0 | 2–0 | 1–2 | 2–0 | 3–2 | 0–5 |
| APEP | 1–0 | 0–0 | 0–1 | 2–1 | | 0–0 | 3–1 | 6–2 | 1–0 | 2–1 | 2–1 | 1–0 | 2–1 | 1–0 |
| Achyronas | 1–1 | 2–2 | 2–2 | 1–1 | 3–1 | | 3–0 | 2–1 | 4–2 | 2–0 | 0–0 | 5–0 | 1–2 | 2–1 |
| Ethnikos Latsion FC | 1–1 | 1–3 | 1–2 | 2–2 | 1–2 | 0–3 | | 0–4 | 2–1 | 2–0 | 1–2 | 4–1 | 1–3 | 1–2 |
| Enosis Kok. | 1–1 | 2–1 | 0–2 | 4–2 | 2–1 | 2–1 | 0–1 | | 1–0 | 2–0 | 1–1 | 3–2 | 0–0 | 0–1 |
| EN Parekklisia | 1–2 | 0–1 | 2–0 | 0–0 | 0–2 | 3–1 | 2–1 | 1–0 | | 3–2 | 3–2 | 2–2 | 1–1 | 1–1 |
| Thiella (Note: Thiella Dromolaxia withdrew after 10th round, all their remaining matches are awarded 0–2 against them.) | 0–2 | 0–2 | 0–5 | 0–2 | 0–2 | 0–2 | 0–2 | 0–2 | 0–2 | | 0–2 | 0–4 | 1–3 | 0–2 |
| Othellos | 1–4 | 3–0 | 4–4 | 3–0 | 4–1 | 2–2 | 2–3 | 0–0 | 0–1 | 2–0 | | 2–0 | 1–0 | 0–2 |
| Orfeas | 4–1 | 4–0 | 2–1 | 3–3 | 0–3 | 3–2 | 2–3 | 2–1 | 0–1 | 2–0 | 2–1 | | 5–2 | 1–1 |
| Sourouklis | 1–1 | 1–1 | 2–2 | 4–0 | 2–2 | 0–3 | 2–3 | 2–0 | 2–1 | 2–0 | 1–2 | 2–1 | | 3–3 |
| Spartakos | 0–0 | 2–1 | 1–1 | 5–0 | 2–1 | 2–1 | 1–0 | 5–0 | 3–1 | 2–0 | 7–0 | 4–2 | 3–1 | |

Legend: Blue = home team win; Yellow = draw; Red = away team win.

== See also ==
- Cypriot Fourth Division
- 2006–07 Cypriot First Division
- 2006–07 Cypriot Cup

== Sources ==
- "2006/07 Cypriot Fourth Division". Rec.Sport.Soccer Statistics Foundation. 2016-01-14.
