= 2006–07 in Cypriot football =

== First Division ==
The first division winners were APOEL.

== Cypriot Cup ==
The cup winners were Anorthosis Famagusta FC.

== Cyprus FA Shield ==
The Cyprus FA Shield winners were Anorthosis Famagusta FC.

== Second Division ==
The second division winners were APOP Kinyras.

== Third Division ==
The third division winners were Ermis Aradippou.

== See also ==
- 2007-08 in Cypriot football
- Cypriot First Division 2006-07
- Cypriot Cup 2006-07
- 2006–07 Cypriot Second Division
