= 2005–06 Cypriot Fourth Division =

Cypriot Fourth Division
- Season: 2005–06
- Champions: Anagennisi G. (1st title)
- Promoted: Anagennisi G. Olympos; Episkopi
- Relegated: Kissos; Elia; Ellinismos
- Matches played: 182
- Goals scored: 554 (3.04 per match)

The 2005–06 Cypriot Fourth Division was the 21st season of the Cypriot fourth-level football league. Anagennisi Germasogeias won their 1st title.

== Format ==
Fourteen teams participated in the 2005–06 Cypriot Fourth Division. All teams played against each other twice, once at their home and once away. The team with the most points at the end of the season crowned champions. The first three teams were promoted to the 2006–07 Cypriot Third Division and the last three teams were relegated to regional leagues.

=== Point system ===
Teams received three points for a win, one point for a draw and zero points for a loss.

== Changes from previous season ==
Teams promoted to 2005–06 Cypriot Third Division

- Frenaros FC
- Digenis Oroklinis
- Atromitos Yeroskipou

Teams relegated from 2004–05 Cypriot Third Division

- Othellos Athienou
- Orfeas Nicosia
- AEK/Achilleas Ayiou Theraponta^{1}

^{1}AEK/Achilleas Ayiou Theraponta withdrew from the 2005–06 Cypriot Fourth Division.

Teams promoted from regional leagues

- FC Episkopi
- APEP Pelendriou
- Anagennisi Trachoniou
- Kissos Kissonergas

Teams relegated to regional leagues

- Anagennisi Lythrodonta
- THOI Avgorou
- Apollon Lympion

== League standings ==
Pos	Team	Pld	W	D	L	GF	GA	GD	Pts	Promotion or relegation
1	Anagennisi Germasogeias (C, P)	26	17	3	6	51	30	+21	54	Promoted to Cypriot Third Division
2	Olympos Xylofagou (P)	26	16	4	6	58	33	+25	52	Promoted to Cypriot Third Division
3	FC Episkopi (P)	26	15	5	6	50	26	+24	50	Promoted to Cypriot Third Division
4	APEP Pelendriou	26	14	3	9	45	32	+13	45	
5	Othellos Athienou	26	10	8	8	40	36	+4	38	
6	Ethnikos Latsion FC	26	10	5	11	49	40	+9	35	
7	Anagennisi Trachoniou	26	8	11	7	40	42	−2	35	
8	Sourouklis Troullon	26	9	7	10	32	43	−11	34	
9	Orfeas Nicosia	26	9	6	11	39	46	−7	33	
10	AOL Omonia Lakatamias	26	9	6	11	27	36	−9	33	
11	Spartakos Kitiou	26	9	3	14	35	32	+3	30	
12	Kissos Kissonergas (R)	26	6	12	8	31	36	−5	30	Relegated to regional leagues
13	Elia Lythrodonta (R)	26	4	6	16	26	48	−22	18	Relegated to regional leagues
14	Ellinismos Akakiou (R)	26	5	3	18	31	74	−43	18	Relegated to regional leagues

Rules for classification: 1) Points, 2) Goal differences, 3) Goals for.
(C) Champions; (P) Promoted; (R) Relegated

== Results ==
Home \ Away	ANG	ANT	AOL	APP	ETN	ELT	ELN	EPS	KSS	OTL	OLM	ORF	SRK	SPR
Anagennisi G.		2–0	0–1	1–3	3–2	2–0	3–0	2–1	0–0	3–0	1–0	2–1	3–0	3–1
Anagennisi Tr.	1–0		1–0	0–1	1–1	1–2	1–1	2–2	1–1	2–2	2–2	1–1	0–2	2–1
AOL Omonia	1–2	1–1		2–1	1–1	2–1	1–1	0–3	1–0	1–0	3–0	4–2	0–0	0–2
APEP	2–1	0–1	2–1		0–2	2–1	10–3	3–0	1–1	1–0	1–0	1–1	0–2	2–0
Ethnikos Latsion FC	3–5	1–3	1–0	1–2		2–0	7–0	1–0	2–0	0–1	4–2	6–0	1–0	1–1
Elia	2–2	1–5	0–2	2–3	2–1		2–1	0–1	1–1	1–1	1–1	1–2	0–0	1–3
Ellinismos	1–2	1–0	2–1	0–3	3–2	1–4		0–1	3–1	3–2	2–6	2–4	1–2	1–3
FC Episkopi	1–4	5–0	6–0	3–1	2–1	1–0	1–0		1–1	1–1	0–0	5–0	2–1	1–0
Kissos	1–1	2–2	1–1	2–2	2–0	2–0	2–0	0–1		1–4	1–1	2–1	3–0	2–1
Othellos	0–2	2–2	2–0	2–1	0–2	3–1	2–2	2–2	0–0		4–2	2–0	3–4	2–0
Olympos	2–1	7–1	3–0	3–2	5–2	5–2	2–1	3–2	3–1	3–0		1–0	2–0	1–0
Orfeas	5–1	1–3	1–0	2–0	2–2	1–1	2–1	2–0	5–1	1–1	1–3		0–0	0–2
Sourouklis	2–3	3–7	2–2	1–0	2–2	1–0	3–1	1–4	2–2	0–2	1–0	1–4		2–1
Spartakos	0–2	0–0	1–2	0–1	3–1	2–0	7–0	1–4	2–1	1–2	0–1	3–0	0–0	

Legend: Blue = home team win; Yellow = draw; Red = away team win.

== See also ==
- Cypriot Fourth Division
- 2005–06 Cypriot First Division
- 2005–06 Cypriot Cup

== Sources ==
- "2005/06 Cypriot Fourth Division". Rec.Sport.Soccer Statistics Foundation. 2016-01-14.
