= 2005–06 Cypriot Third Division =

Cypriot Third Division
- Season: 2005–06
- Champions: AEM (1st title)
- Promoted: AEM; ASIL; Akritas
- Relegated: Achyronas; Enosis K. AEK Kythreas
- Matches played: 182
- Goals scored: 624 (3.43 per match)

The 2005–06 Cypriot Third Division was the 35th season of the Cypriot third-level football league. AEM Mesogis won their 1st title.

== Format ==
Fourteen teams participated in the 2005–06 Cypriot Third Division. All teams played against each other twice, once at their home and once away. The team with the most points at the end of the season crowned champions. The first three teams were promoted to the 2006–07 Cypriot Second Division and the last three teams were relegated to the 2006–07 Cypriot Fourth Division.

=== Point system ===
Teams received three points for a win, one point for a draw and zero points for a loss.

== Changes from previous season ==
Teams promoted to 2005–06 Cypriot Second Division

- SEK Agiou Athanasiou
- Elpida Xylofagou
- Iraklis Gerolakkou

Teams relegated from 2004–05 Cypriot Second Division

- ASIL Lysi
- Ermis Aradippou
- Akritas Chlorakas

Teams promoted from 2004–05 Cypriot Fourth Division

- Frenaros FC
- Digenis Oroklinis
- Atromitos Yeroskipou

Teams relegated to 2005–06 Cypriot Fourth Division

- Othellos Athienou
- Orfeas Nicosia
- AEK/Achilleas Ayiou Theraponta

== League standings ==
Pos	Team	Pld	W	D	L	GF	GA	GD	Pts	Promotion or relegation
1	AEM Mesogis (C, P)	26	19	3	4	74	35	+39	60	Promoted to Cypriot Second Division
2	ASIL Lysi (P)	26	18	3	5	74	36	+38	57	Promoted to Cypriot Second Division
3	Akritas Chlorakas (P)	26	12	9	5	56	40	+16	45	Promoted to Cypriot Second Division
4	Digenis Oroklinis	26	12	6	8	43	40	+3	42	
5	ENAD Polis Chrysochous	26	12	3	11	39	40	−1	39	
6	Atromitos Yeroskipou	26	11	5	10	58	46	+12	38	
7	PAEEK FC	26	11	3	12	48	45	+3	36	
8	Frenaros FC	26	9	7	10	34	36	−2	34	
9	Ermis Aradippou	26	10	3	13	39	46	−7	33	
10	Adonis Idaliou	26	8	8	10	37	40	−3	32	
11	AEZ Zakakiou	26	8	6	12	34	46	−12	30	
12	Achyronas Liopetriou (R)	26	8	5	13	31	48	−17	29	Relegated to Cypriot Fourth Division
13	Enosis Kokkinotrimithia (R)	26	6	2	18	33	56	−23	20	Relegated to Cypriot Fourth Division
14	AEK Kythreas (R)	26	5	3	18	24	70	−46	18	Relegated to Cypriot Fourth Division

Rules for classification: 1) Points, 2) Goal differences, 3) Goals for.
(C) Champions; (P) Promoted; (R) Relegated

== Results ==
Home \ Away	ADN	AEZ	AEK	AEM	AKR	ASL	ATR	ACL	DGN	ENK	END	ERM	PKK	FRN
Adonis		1–1	0–1	2–1	2–2	1–3	3–3	3–0	0–2	2–0	3–2	1–0	0–0	1–1
AEZ	2–1		2–0	1–3	1–1	1–3	1–1	2–0	0–3	3–1	1–0	2–0	2–1	1–1
AEK	2–1	3–2		0–1	0–6	1–6	1–4	0–1	1–1	5–2	0–1	1–3	1–1	0–0
AEM	3–1	2–2	4–2		0–0	6–3	1–1	5–0	4–2	5–2	3–0	4–1	6–2	2–1
Akritas	3–1	3–1	2–1	2–1		2–1	3–1	4–2	1–2	4–2	2–2	4–1	3–1	2–3
ASIL	2–0	5–1	4–0	1–2	5–1		2–1	4–0	2–2	5–1	4–1	2–2	3–2	2–1
Atromitos	4–2	2–1	8–1	1–2	3–1	3–2		1–1	2–3	1–2	0–1	2–0	2–4	2–0
Achyronas	2–4	3–1	5–0	0–4	1–1	1–1	3–2		1–0	2–3	2–1	4–2	1–0	1–2
Digenis	0–0	0–1	3–1	1–3	1–1	0–2	3–6	2–1		3–1	1–2	1–5	3–2	2–0
Enosis	1–2	4–1	1–2	0–1	1–1	1–3	1–2	0–0	0–1		4–2	0–1	2–1	1–0
ENAD	1–1	3–1	4–0	3–2	2–3	1–3	2–1	2–0	0–0	2–0		2–1	1–0	0–1
Ermis	0–2	1–0	1–0	2–4	2–2	1–3	3–1	2–0	1–1	2–0	3–2		2–3	2–1
PAEEK FC	3–2	3–2	4–0	3–2	2–1	1–2	2–2	2–0	1–2	1–0	4–1	3–1		1–2
Frenaros	1–1	1–1	3–1	2–3	1–1	3–1	1–2	0–0	2–4	4–3	0–1	1–0	2–1	

Legend: Blue = home team win; Yellow = draw; Red = away team win.

== See also ==
- Cypriot Third Division
- 2005–06 Cypriot First Division
- 2005–06 Cypriot Cup

== Sources ==
- "2005/06 Cypriot Third Division". Rec.Sport.Soccer Statistics Foundation. 2016-01-14.
