= Photoula Hadjipapa =

Cypriot doctor and politician

Photoula Hadjipapa (Greek: Φωτούλλα Χατζήπαπα; born 1957), is a Cypriot doctor and politician, first female mayoress of Lakatamia since she was elected on 2016 local elections and is one of the four female mayoress in the country. She is an independent politician but formed part of Progressive Party of Working People lists and was also candidate on 2011 elections. Hadjipapa studied Medicine degree in Medical University of Sofia and postgraduate of General Medicine at University of Surrey. She was elected city councilor on 1991 until 2004 for AKEL.
