= 2006–07 Cypriot Third Division =

Cypriot Third Division
- Season: 2006–07
- Champions: Ermis (3rd title)
- Promoted: Ermis; Atromitos; Olympos
- Relegated: Digenis Or. Episkopi; SEK
- Matches played: 182
- Goals scored: 548 (3.01 per match)

The 2006–07 Cypriot Third Division was the 36th season of the Cypriot third-level football league. Ermis Aradippou won their 3rd title.

== Format ==
Fourteen teams participated in the 2006–07 Cypriot Third Division. All teams played against each other twice, once at their home and once away. The team with the most points at the end of the season crowned champions. The first three teams were promoted to the 2007–08 Cypriot Second Division and the last three teams were relegated to the 2007–08 Cypriot Fourth Division.

=== Point system ===
Teams received three points for a win, one point for a draw and zero points for a loss.

== Changes from previous season ==
Teams promoted to 2006–07 Cypriot Second Division

- AEM Mesogis
- ASIL Lysi
- Akritas Chlorakas

Teams relegated from 2005–06 Cypriot Second Division

- Elpida Xylofagou
- Ethnikos Assia
- SEK Agiou Athanasiou

Teams promoted from 2005–06 Cypriot Fourth Division

- Anagennisi Germasogeias
- Olympos Xylofagou
- FC Episkopi

Teams relegated to 2006–07 Cypriot Fourth Division

- Achyronas Liopetriou
- Enosis Kokkinotrimithia
- AEK Kythreas

== League standings ==
Pos	Team	Pld	W	D	L	GF	GA	GD	Pts	Promotion or relegation
1	Ermis Aradippou (C, P)	26	14	9	3	54	25	+29	51	Promoted to Cypriot Second Division
2	Atromitos Yeroskipou (P)	26	13	6	7	51	38	+13	45	Promoted to Cypriot Second Division
3	Olympos Xylofagou (P)	26	11	11	4	61	28	+33	44	Promoted to Cypriot Second Division
4	Anagennisi Germasogeias	26	11	7	8	34	33	+1	40	
5	AEZ Zakakiou	26	10	8	8	40	36	+4	38 (Note: AEZ 7p; ENAD 5p; Adonis 4p)	
6	ENAD Polis Chrysochous	26	9	11	6	39	32	+7	38	
7	Adonis Idaliou	26	9	11	6	35	25	+10	38	
8	Ethnikos Assia	26	10	7	9	42	37	+5	37 (Note: Ethnikos 12p; PAEEK 6p; Elpida 0p)	
9	PAEEK FC	26	11	4	11	38	35	+3	37	
10	Elpida Xylofagou	26	10	7	9	32	31	+1	37	
11	Frenaros FC	26	10	6	10	44	38	+6	36	
12	Digenis Oroklinis (R)	26	9	6	11	29	38	−9	33	Relegated to Cypriot Fourth Division
13	FC Episkopi (R)	26	3	6	17	25	59	−34	15	Relegated to Cypriot Fourth Division
14	SEK Agiou Athanasiou (R)	26	1	3	22	24	93	−69	6	Relegated to Cypriot Fourth Division

Rules for classification: 1) points; 2) head-to-head points; 3) head-to-head goal difference; 4) head-to-head away goals scored; 5) goal difference; 6) number of goals scored.
(C) Champions; (P) Promoted; (R) Relegated

== Results ==
Home \ Away	ADN	AEZ	ANG	ATR	DGN	ETN	ELP	END	EPS	ERM	OLM	PKK	SEK	FRN
Adonis		1–0	0–0	2–3	0–0	2–0	1–1	2–2	1–0	1–1	1–1	3–0	6–1	1–0
AEZ	1–0		3–1	1–2	2–1	2–1	0–0	2–2	1–1	1–2	3–1	3–2	2–2	1–0
Anagennisi	1–1	2–0		4–2	2–1	2–0	2–0	2–0	1–1	2–2	1–1	2–1	3–1	1–0
Atromitos	2–0	1–0	1–0		7–1	0–0	1–0	3–2	5–3	1–0	2–3	2–0	2–2	2–3
Digenis	1–1	2–4	3–0	0–0		1–0	3–1	4–3	3–0	0–3	1–1	1–0	2–1	1–0
Ethnikos	1–1	3–2	2–1	0–0	4–0		2–1	6–0	2–1	1–1	0–2	0–2	3–1	3–3
Elpida	1–1	2–0	1–0	3–1	2–0	1–4		1–0	0–2	2–2	1–0	0–1	2–0	1–0
ENAD	1–0	2–3	2–0	0–0	1–0	5–0	1–1		3–2	4–0	0–0	2–0	2–0	2–2
FC Episkopi	0–2	0–0	1–2	1–4	2–2	3–3	1–1	0–1		0–6	1–3	1–2	1–2	2–1
Ermis	0–0	3–2	6–1	0–0	1–0	0–0	4–3	1–1	4–0		1–1	1–2	3–0	3–0
Olympos	4–2	0–0	0–0	2–1	0–0	2–1	1–1	0–0	4–1	1–2		2–1	24–3	2–2
PAEEK FC	0–1	2–2	1–1	4–1	1–0	0–3	2–0	2–2	2–0	1–3	2–1		4–0	1–1
SEK	0–3	1–3	1–3	3–6	1–2	2–3	1–2	0–0	0–1	0–3	0–3	0–4		2–3
Frenaros FC	4–2	2–2	2–0	4–2	1–0	2–0	1–4	1–1	4–0	1–2	1–2	3–1	3–0	

Legend: Blue = home team win; Yellow = draw; Red = away team win.

== See also ==
- Cypriot Third Division
- 2006–07 Cypriot First Division
- 2006–07 Cypriot Cup

== Sources ==
- "2006/07 Cypriot Third Division". Rec.Sport.Soccer Statistics Foundation. 2016-01-14.
