= 2006–07 Cypriot Second Division =

Cypriot Second Division
- Season: 2006–07
- Champions: APOP Kinyras (2nd title)
- Promoted: APOP Kinyras; Alki; Doxa
- Relegated: Chalkanoras; Ermis; AEM
- Matches: 182
- Goals: 546 (3 per match)

The 2006–07 Cypriot Second Division was the 52nd season of the Cypriot second-level football league. APOP Kinyras won their 2nd title.

== Format ==
Fourteen teams participated in the 2006–07 Cypriot Second Division. All teams played against each other twice, once at their home and once away. The team with the most points at the end of the season crowned champions. The first three teams were promoted to 2007–08 Cypriot First Division and the last three teams were relegated to the 2007–08 Cypriot Third Division.

== Changes from previous season ==
Teams promoted to 2006–07 Cypriot First Division

- AEP Paphos
- Aris Limassol
- Ayia Napa

Teams relegated from 2005–06 Cypriot First Division

- APOP Kinyras
- APEP
- THOI Lakatamia

Teams promoted from 2005–06 Cypriot Third Division

- AEM Mesogis
- ASIL Lysi
- Akritas Chlorakas

Teams relegated to 2006–07 Cypriot Third Division

- Elpida Xylofagou
- Ethnikos Assia
- SEK Agiou Athanasiou

== League standings ==
Pos	Team	Pld	W	D	L	GF	GA	GD	Pts	Promotion or relegation
1	APOP Kinyras (C, P)	26	18	4	4	65	22	+43	58	Promoted to Cypriot First Division
2	Alki Larnaca (P)	26	17	5	4	46	16	+30	56	Promoted to Cypriot First Division
3	Doxa Katokopias (P)	26	15	5	6	36	20	+16	50	Promoted to Cypriot First Division
4	THOI Lakatamia	26	13	10	3	54	36	+18	49	
5	ASIL Lysi	26	13	8	5	48	26	+22	47	
6	Anagennisi Deryneia	26	8	12	6	30	27	+3	36	
7	Omonia Aradippou	26	10	5	11	38	31	+7	35 (Note: Omonia 0–0 MEAP; MEAP 0–1 Omonia)	
8	MEAP Nisou	26	9	8	9	33	40	−7	35	
9	Onisilos Sotira	26	9	6	11	39	31	+8	33	
10	APEP	26	9	4	13	38	43	−5	31	
11	Akritas Chlorakas	26	8	6	12	33	41	−8	30	
12	Chalkanoras Idaliou (R)	26	6	8	12	36	47	−11	26	Relegated to Cypriot Third Division
13	Iraklis Gerolakkou (R)	26	3	4	19	25	62	−37	13	Relegated to Cypriot Third Division
14	AEM Mesogis (R)	26	0	3	23	25	104	−79	3	Relegated to Cypriot Third Division

Rules for classification: 1) points; 2) head-to-head points; 3) head-to-head goal difference; 4) head-to-head away goals scored; 5) goal difference; 6) number of goals scored
(C) Champions; (P) Promoted; (R) Relegated

== Results ==
Home \ Away	AEM	AKR	ALK	ANG	APP	APK	ASL	DXK	THL	IRK	MPN	OMN	ONS	CHL
AEM		1–4	0–3	2–2	1–3	0–3	1–3	1–4	3–5	2–6	2–2	2–4	0–7	2–5
Akritas	3–2		1–2	2–2	0–0	1–2	0–3	2–1	1–3	3–0	4–3	2–1	2–0	0–1
Alki	13–0	1–0		1–1	3–2	0–2	1–0	1–0	4–1	4–1	2–0	1–0	1–0	0–0
Anagennisi	3–0	1–1	1–2		1–0	1–1	1–0	0–2	0–0	2–0	2–2	3–1	1–0	4–1
APEP	2–1	0–0	1–2	4–0		1–3	1–1	3–1	3–0	2–0	1–2	2–5	2–2	2–1
APOP Kinyras	7–1	2–1	1–1	1–0	6–0		2–0	2–0	3–3	6–0	2–0	2–0	2–0	4–0
ASIL	2–1	4–1	0–0	1–1	4–1	3–1		1–0	1–1	3–2	0–0	1–1	1–2	7–2
Doxa	1–0	3–1	0–1	0–0	2–1	2–1	1–0		2–2	2–0	2–0	1–0	2–1	3–0
THOI	6–0	2–1	1–0	3–1	2–1	2–1	2–2	1–1		2–1	2–2	1–1	1–1	2–1
Iraklis	2–2	1–2	0–1	1–1	0–3	0–3	0–2	0–2	0–2		1–2	1–0	5–3	1–1
MEAP	2–0	0–0	0–0	0–0	1–0	3–2	3–5	1–2	1–5	2–1		0–1	1–0	3–2
Omonia	4–0	3–1	1–0	1–2	0–1	1–1	1–3	0–1	1–2	4–1	0–0		3–1	3–1
Onisilos	3–0	3–0	2–0	0–0	2–1	2–3	0–1	0–0	2–1	1–1	2–0	1–2		3–0
Chalkanoras	5–1	0–0	1–2	1–0	3–1	0–2	0–0	1–1	2–2	5–0	2–3	0–0	1–1	

Legend: Blue = home team win; Yellow = draw; Red = away team win.

== See also ==
- Cypriot Second Division
- 2006–07 Cypriot First Division
- 2006–07 Cypriot Cup
- 2006–07 in Cypriot football

== Sources ==
- "2006/07 Cypriot Second Division". Rec.Sport.Soccer Statistics Foundation. 2016-01-14.
- "2. DIVISION 2006–07". Soccerway. Archived from the original on March 31, 2016.
