= 2005–06 Cypriot Second Division =

Cypriot Second Division
- Season: 2005–06
- Champions: AEP (1st title)
- Promoted: AEP; Aris; Ayia Napa
- Relegated: Elpida; Ethnikos; SEK
- Matches played: 182
- Goals scored: 568 (3.12 per match)

The 2005–06 Cypriot Second Division was the 51st season of the Cypriot second-level football league. AEP Paphos won their 1st title.

== Format ==
Fourteen teams participated in the 2005–06 Cypriot Second Division. All teams played against each other twice, once at their home and once away. The team with the most points at the end of the season crowned champions. The first three teams were promoted to 2006–07 Cypriot First Division and the last three teams were relegated to the 2006–07 Cypriot Third Division.

== Changes from previous season ==
Teams promoted to 2005–06 Cypriot First Division

- APOP Kinyras
- APEP
- THOI Lakatamia

Teams relegated from 2004–05 Cypriot First Division

- AEP Paphos
- Alki Larnaca
- Aris Limassol

Teams promoted from 2004–05 Cypriot Third Division

- SEK Agiou Athanasiou
- Elpida Xylofagou
- Iraklis Gerolakkou

Teams relegated to 2005–06 Cypriot Third Division

- ASIL Lysi
- Ermis Aradippou
- Akritas Chlorakas

== League standings ==
Pos	Team	Pld	W	D	L	GF	GA	GD	Pts	Promotion or relegation
1	AEP Paphos (C, P)	26	17	6	3	69	23	+46	57	Promoted to Cypriot First Division
2	Aris Limassol (P)	26	18	2	6	66	36	+30	56	Promoted to Cypriot First Division
3	Ayia Napa (P)	26	14	6	6	48	27	+21	48	Promoted to Cypriot First Division
4	Alki Larnaca	26	12	5	9	48	34	+14	41	
5	Omonia Aradippou	26	9	10	7	33	29	+4	37	
6	MEAP Nisou	26	9	9	8	38	36	+2	36	
7	Doxa Katokopias	26	8	11	7	37	30	+7	35	
8	Chalkanoras Idaliou	26	9	7	10	37	35	+2	34	
9	Anagennisi Deryneia	26	9	5	12	39	47	−8	32	
10	Onisilos Sotira	26	8	8	10	33	42	−9	32	
11	Iraklis Gerolakkou	26	8	7	11	33	50	−17	31	
12	Elpida Xylofagou (R)	26	8	3	15	27	44	−17	27	Relegated to Cypriot Third Division
13	Ethnikos Assia (R)	26	7	5	14	41	50	−9	26	Relegated to Cypriot Third Division
14	SEK Agiou Athanasiou (R)	26	1	6	19	19	85	−66	9	Relegated to Cypriot Third Division

Rules for classification: 1) Points, 2) Goal differences, 3) Goal for
(C) Champions; (P) Promoted; (R) Relegated

== Results ==
Home \ Away	ANP	AEP	ALK	ANG	ARS	DXK	ETH	ELP	IRK	MPN	OMN	ONS	SEK	CHL
Ayia Napa		2–2	3–3	4–3	0–3	3–1	4–1	0–1	1–0	3–0	1–0	2–1	6–0	2–0
AEP Paphos F.C.	3–0		3–0	5–0	3–0	1–1	2–1	7–1	2–3	4–2	3–2	5–2	7–0	2–0
Alki	1–0	2–0		2–3	1–0	3–0	3–1	3–0	3–0	1–1	0–2	4–1	8–1	0–2
Anagennisi	2–0	0–2	1–1		2–5	3–0	3–2	0–0	1–2	1–2	3–1	0–0	1–0	1–2
Aris	2–2	1–2	2–1	3–2		1–1	2–0	3–1	4–1	4–0	2–0	6–1	4–1	3–2
Doxa	1–1	1–1	2–1	2–2	5–0		2–2	2–1	2–0	0–0	0–1	3–0	4–0	1–1
Ethnikos	0–3	1–3	2–0	1–3	2–5	1–3		1–0	4–0	2–1	2–2	4–0	6–1	3–1
Elpida	1–0	1–1	2–3	1–0	1–7	1–0	1–1		1–0	0–1	0–1	2–0	5–1	3–0
Iraklis	1–1	0–7	1–3	0–2	1–3	1–0	2–1	1–0		3–3	2–2	0–0	3–0	2–2
MEAP	0–2	1–1	2–1	4–1	1–2	1–2	2–0	1–0	0–0		0–0	2–2	3–0	1–1
Omonia	0–2	0–1	0–0	3–2	1–0	1–1	2–1	2–0	2–2	2–3		1–1	3–0	0–0
Onisilos	0–2	2–0	2–0	1–1	3–0	1–1	3–0	4–1	1–2	2–1	2–2		0–0	0–1
SEK Agiou Athanasiou	1–4	0–0	1–1	1–2	1–2	2–2	1–1	3–2	0–3	2–2	1–3	2–3		0–4
Chalkanoras	0–0	0–2	2–3	3–0	1–2	1–0	1–1	2–1	5–3	0–4	0–0	0–1	6–0	

Legend: Blue = home team win; Yellow = draw; Red = away team win.

== See also ==
- Cypriot Second Division
- 2005–06 Cypriot First Division
- 2005–06 Cypriot Cup

== Sources ==
- "2005/06 Cypriot Second Division". Rec.Sport.Soccer Statistics Foundation. 2016-01-14.
