= Constantinos Mina =

Cypriot footballer (born 1974)

Personal information
- Full name: Constantinos Mina
- Date of birth: May 1, 1974 (age 52)
- Place of birth: Nicosia, Cyprus
- Height: 1.74 m (5 ft 9 in)
- Position: Defender

Senior career*
| Years | Team | Apps | (Gls) |
| 1998–2009 | AEK Larnaca | 186 | (0) |
- * Club domestic league appearances and goals

Constantinos Mina (born May 1, 1974) is a Cypriot retired defender who used to play for AEK Larnaca.

== Honours ==
AEK Larnaca

- Cypriot Cup: 2003–04
