= Thiella Dromolaxia =

Cypriot football club

- Founded: 1959; 66 years ago
- Ground: Stadium of Dromolaxia
- Capacity: 500
- League: ΣΤΟΚ
- ΣΤΟΚ Larnaca 2024-2025: 7th

Thiella Dromolaxia (Greek: Θύελλα Δρομολαξιάς) is a Cypriot association football club based in Dromolaxia, located in the Larnaca District. Its colours are red and blue. It has 1 participations in Cypriot Fourth Division (2006–07 Cypriot Fourth Division).
