= Kissos Kissonerga =

Cypriot football club

- Founded: 1990; 35 years ago

Kissos Kissonerga is a Cypriot association football club based in Kissonerga, located in the Paphos District. Its colours are green, yellow, and red. It has 1 participations in Cypriot Fourth Division. In 2007, the team merged with AEM Mesogis to form Kissos FC Kissonergas. In 2014, Kissos FC Kissonergas dissolved and Kissos Kissonerga was re-founded.
