= Lakatamia =

Lakatamia: Λακατάμια (Greek); Lakadamya (Turkish)
- Municipality
- Interactive map of Lakatamia
- Location within Cyprus Location within the Eastern Mediterranean Location within the European Union Location within Asia
- Coordinates: 35°7′0″N 33°19′0″E
- Country: Cyprus
- District: Nicosia District
- Urban area: Nicosia

Government
  - Type: Municipality
  - Mayor: Photoula Hadjipapa (AKEL)

Area
  - Municipality: 27.45 km^{2} (10.60 sq mi)

Population (2011)
  - Municipality: 38,345
  - Density: 1,397/km^{2} (3,618/sq mi)
- Time zone: UTC+2 (EET)
  - Summer (DST): UTC+3 (EEST)
- Website: www.lakatamia.org.cy

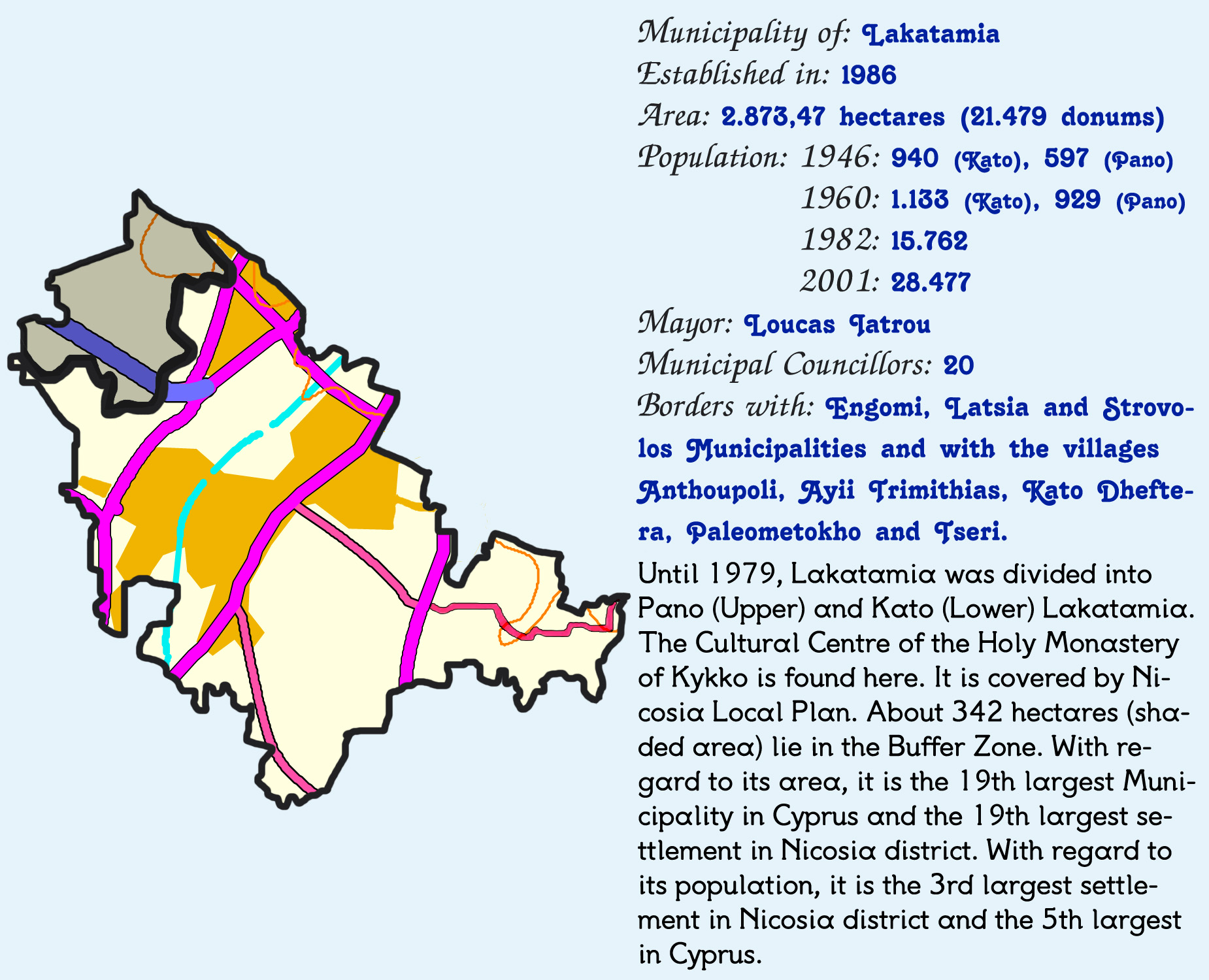
Concise presentation of Lakatamia

Lakatamia (Greek: Λακατάμια Greek pronunciation: [lakaˈtamɳa]; Turkish: Lakadamya) is a southwestern village of Nicosia, Cyprus. In terms of population, Lakatamia municipality is the third largest municipality in Nicosia district and the fifth largest municipality in Cyprus (after Limassol, Strovolos, Nicosia and Larnaca). In 2011 Lakatamia had a population of 38,345.

Due to the expansion of the Nicosia urban area, Lakatamia has grown from two small villages (Upper and Lower Lakatamia) into a sizeable suburb. Lower Lakatamia used to be inhabited by both Greek and Turkish Cypriots until the mid-1950s. Its name originates from "alakatia", i.e. wells, which were apparently abundant in the old village. Lakatamia Air Force Base, an airstrip used by the Cypriot National Guard, is located to the east of Lakatamia.

Lakatamia is also home to a football club EN THOI Lakatamia who has played in the Cypriot First Division, however for only one season in their history. THOI usually play in the lower leagues and are currently in the Cypriot Third Division. Cypriot international Valentinos Sielis used to play at the club

== Naming ==
There are no convincing historical evidence with regard to the origin of the name “Lakatamia”. There are only a few speculations as from where Lakatamia's name derives from.

The most probable origin of the name, is connected with the many “alakatia” (water wheels) that existed in Lakatamia and were used to draw the abundant underground water from the springs. It is believed that there were more than 80 wells (“alakatia”) in Lakatamia, and that's why the area is called Lakatamia (“alakatia”-“Alakatamia”-“Lakatamia” The “alakati” is today the emblem of Lakatamia's Municipality.

Another speculation, as from where Lakatamia took its name, is that the name was originally “Lakedemon” as the name of ancient Sparta and it was paraphrased through the years and ended up as Lakatamia.

== Sister cities ==
Lakatamia is twinned with the following cities:

- Alexandroupolis, Greece (since 1992)
- Kalymnos, Greece (since 1996)
- Marousi, Greece (since 2008)
