= 2006–07 Cypriot First Division =

Cypriot First Division
- Season: 2006–07
- Champions: APOEL (19th title)
- Relegated: Digenis; Ayia Napa; AEP
- Champions League: APOEL (1st qualifying round)
- UEFA Cup: Omonia (1st qualifying round); Anorthosis (1st qualifying round; via Cypriot Cup))
- Intertoto Cup: Ethnikos (1st round)
- Matches: 182
- Goals: 496 (2.73 per match)
- Top goalscorer: Esteban Solari (20 goals)

The 2006–07 Cypriot First Division was the 68th season of the Cypriot top-level football league. APOEL won their 19th title.

== Format ==
Fourteen teams participated in the 2006–07 Cypriot First Division. All teams played against each other twice, once at their home and once away. The team with the most points at the end of the season crowned champions. The last three teams were relegated to the 2007–08 Cypriot Second Division.

The champions ensured their participation in the 2007–08 UEFA Champions League and the runners-up in the 2007–08 UEFA Cup.

The teams had to declare their interest to participate in the 2007 UEFA Intertoto Cup before the end of the championship. At the end of the championship, the higher placed team among the interested ones participated in the Intertoto Cup (if they had not secured their participation in any other UEFA competition).

=== Point system ===
Teams received three points for a win, one point for a draw and zero points for a loss.

== Changes from previous season ==
APOP Kinyras, APEP and THOI Lakatamia were relegated from previous season and played in the 2006–07 Cypriot Second Division. They were replaced by the first three teams of the 2005–06 Cypriot Second Division, AEP Paphos, Aris Limassol and Ayia Napa.

== Stadia and locations ==
2006–07 Cypriot First Division

Team	Stadium
Ayia Napa	Paralimni Stadium
AEK	GSZ Stadium
AEL	Tsirion Stadium
AEP	Pafiako Stadium
Anorthosis	Antonis Papadopoulos Stadium
APOEL	GSP Stadium
Apollon	Tsirion Stadium
Aris	Tsirion Stadium
Digenis	Makario Stadium
Ethnikos	Dasaki Stadium
Enosis	Paralimni Stadium
Nea Salamina	Ammochostos Stadium
Olympiakos	GSP Stadium
Omonia	GSP Stadium

== League standings ==
Pos	Team	Pld	W	D	L	GF	GA	GD	Pts	Qualification or relegation
1	APOEL (C)	26	20	4	2	59	22	+37	64	Qualification for Champions League first qualifying round
2	Omonia	26	18	3	5	62	22	+40	57	Qualification for UEFA Cup first qualifying round (Note: Anorthosis Famagusta qualified for the UEFA Cup first qualifying round by winning the 2006–07 Cypriot Cup.)
3	Anorthosis Famagusta	26	16	5	5	42	20	+22	53	Qualification for UEFA Cup first qualifying round
4	Ethnikos Achna	26	10	7	9	38	33	+5	37	Qualification for Intertoto Cup first round
5	Enosis Neon Paralimni	26	10	5	11	31	27	+4	35 (Note: Enosis: 6pts; Apollon: 0pts)	
6	Apollon Limassol	26	10	5	11	35	36	−1	35	
7	AEK Larnaca	26	8	10	8	33	32	+1	34	
8	Aris Limassol	26	9	5	12	39	58	−19	32	
9	AEL Limassol	26	8	6	12	31	42	−11	30 (Note: AEL: 4pts; Nea Salamina: 1pts)	
10	Nea Salamina	26	7	9	10	32	41	−9	30	
11	Olympiakos Nicosia	26	6	10	10	24	36	−12	28	
12	Digenis Morphou (R)	26	5	10	11	23	41	−18	25	Relegation to Cypriot Second Division
13	Ayia Napa (R)	26	4	8	14	26	41	−15	20	Relegation to Cypriot Second Division
14	AEP Paphos (R)	26	3	9	14	21	45	−24	18	Relegation to Cypriot Second Division

Rules for classification: 1) points; 2) head-to-head points; 3) head-to-head goal difference; 4) head-to-head away goals scored; 5) goal difference; 6) number of goals scored
(C) Champions; (R) Relegated

== Results ==
Home \ Away	ANP	AEK	AEL	AEP	ANR	APN	APL	ARS	DGN	ETH	ENP	NSL	OLM	OMN
Ayia Napa		0–1	0–1	3–1	0–2	2–2	2–3	4–1	1–3	1–1	2–1	1–2	0–0	2–1
AEK	2–0		1–1	2–1	0–3	0–1	0–0	7–1	1–1	0–2	1–1	1–0	1–2	1–2
AEL	2–1	0–1		3–2	0–2	0–4	1–1	3–3	1–2	1–3	2–1	2–2	0–2	0–2
AEP	1–1	1–1	1–1		0–2	1–3	1–5	1–2	0–1	0–1	1–0	0–0	0–0	2–2
Anorthosis	1–1	1–1	1–0	4–0		1–1	2–1	2–0	2–1	3–2	1–0	4–1	2–1	0–2
APOEL	3–0	2–1	2–1	2–1	1–0		1–0	5–0	4–0	2–1	3–2	1–0	5–0	2–2
Apollon	1–0	1–1	2–4	1–2	1–1	2–1		1–0	3–0	3–1	1–3	1–1	0–3	1–2
Aris	2–1	1–1	1–2	2–0	2–1	2–3	1–2		2–2	4–2	3–1	5–2	2–0	0–5
Digenis	2–0	1–1	0–0	1–1	0–2	1–3	1–0	1–2		1–1	1–2	1–1	0–0	1–2
Ethnikos	2–2	2–0	3–1	1–1	2–3	3–1	3–1	5–1	0–0		0–0	0–1	0–0	1–3
ENP	2–0	2–3	3–0	0–1	0–2	0–0	1–0	2–0	2–0	1–0		0–0	1–1	2–0
Nea Salamina	1–1	3–3	0–3	3–1	1–0	0–3	0–1	0–0	3–1	0–1	3–1		5–1	0–2
Olympiakos	2–0	0–2	0–2	1–1	0–0	1–2	1–3	1–1	1–1	0–1	1–0	3–3		2–1
Omonia	1–1	3–0	2–0	3–0	2–0	1–2	3–0	4–1	6–0	3–0	1–3	4–0	3–1	

Legend: Blue = home team win; Yellow = draw; Red = away team win.

== Attendances ==
#	Club	Average
1	APOEL	8,932
2	Omonoia	6,678
3	Anorthosis	5,231
4	Apollon Limassol	3,513
5	AEL	3,301
6	Olympiakos Nicosia	1,563
7	Nea Salamina	1,439
8	AEK Larnaca	1,288
9	Aris Limassol	1,203
10	AEP	1,189
11	Digenis	1,167
12	ENP	849
13	Ethnikos Achnas	719
14	Ayia Napa	684

== See also ==
- Cypriot First Division
- 2006–07 Cypriot Cup
- List of top goalscorers in Cypriot First Division by season
- Cypriot football clubs in European competitions

== Sources ==
- "2006/07 Cypriot First Division". Rec.Sport.Soccer Statistics Foundation. 2016-01-14.
- "1. DIVISION 2006/2007". Soccerway.
