= 2005–06 Cypriot First Division =

Cypriot First Division
- Season: 2005–06
- Champions: Apollon (3rd title)
- Relegated: APOP; APEP; THOI
- Champions League: Apollon (1st qualifying round)
- UEFA Cup: Omonia (1st qualifying round); APOEL (1st qualifying round; via Cypriot Cup))
- Intertoto Cup: Ethnikos (1st round)
- Matches: 182
- Goals: 603 (3.31 per match)
- Top goalscorer: Łukasz Sosin (28 goals)

The 2005–06 Cypriot First Division was the 67th season of the Cypriot top-level football league. Apollon won their 3rd title.

== Format ==
Fourteen teams participated in the 2005–06 Cypriot First Division. All teams played against each other twice, once at their home and once away. The team with the most points at the end of the season crowned champions. The last three teams were relegated to the 2006–07 Cypriot Second Division.

The champions ensured their participation in the 2006–07 UEFA Champions League and the runners-up in the 2006–07 UEFA Cup.

The teams had to declare their interest to participate in the 2006 UEFA Intertoto Cup before the end of the championship. At the end of the championship, the higher placed team among the interested ones participated in the Intertoto Cup (if they had not secured their participation in any other UEFA competition).

=== Point system ===
Teams received three points for a win, one point for a draw and zero points for a loss.

== Changes from previous season ==
AEP Paphos, Alki Larnaca and Aris Limassol were relegated from previous season and played in the 2005–06 Cypriot Second Division. They were replaced by the first three teams of the 2004–05 Cypriot Second Division, APOP Kinyras, APEP and THOI Lakatamia.

== Stadia and locations ==
2005–06 Cypriot First Division

Team	Stadium
AEK	GSZ Stadium
AEL	Tsirion Stadium
Anorthosis	Antonis Papadopoulos Stadium
APEP	THOI Stadium
APOEL	GSP Stadium
Apollon	Tsirion Stadium
APOP	Pafiako Stadium
Digenis	Makario Stadium
Ethnikos Achna	Dasaki Stadium
Enosis Neon Paralimni	Paralimni Stadium
THOI	THOI Stadium
Nea Salamina	Ammochostos Stadium
Olympiakos	GSP Stadium
Omonia	GSP Stadium

== League standings ==
Pos	Team	Pld	W	D	L	GF	GA	GD	Pts	Qualification or relegation
1	Apollon Limassol (C)	26	19	7	0	68	24	+44	64	Qualification for Champions League first qualifying round
2	Omonia	26	20	3	3	59	20	+39	63	Qualification for UEFA Cup first qualifying round (Note: APOEL qualified for the UEFA Cup first qualifying round by winning the 2005–06 Cypriot Cup.)
3	APOEL	26	19	5	2	63	22	+41	62	Qualification for UEFA Cup first qualifying round
4	Anorthosis Famagusta	26	15	8	3	55	26	+29	53	
5	Enosis Neon Paralimni	26	12	7	7	40	28	+12	43	
6	Nea Salamina	26	12	5	9	53	48	+5	41	
7	AEL Limassol	26	10	5	11	44	48	−4	35	
8	AEK Larnaca	26	9	4	13	39	37	+2	31	
9	Ethnikos Achna	26	8	4	14	42	43	−1	28	Qualification for Intertoto Cup first round
10	Digenis Morphou	26	7	7	12	33	45	−12	28	
11	Olympiakos Nicosia	26	6	9	11	40	50	−10	27	
12	APOP Kinyras (R)	26	5	3	18	35	65	−30	18	Relegation to Cypriot Second Division
13	APEP (R)	26	1	5	20	17	72	−55	8	Relegation to Cypriot Second Division
14	THOI Lakatamia (R)	26	1	4	21	15	75	−60	7	Relegation to Cypriot Second Division

Rules for classification: 1) Points, 2) Goal differences, 3) Goals for
(C) Champions; (R) Relegated

== Results ==
Home \ Away	AEK	AEL	ANR	APP	APN	APL	APK	DGN	ETH	ENP	ENT	NSL	OLM	OMN
AEK		2–0	1–1	3–1	1–2	2–3	5–0	1–1	3–0	1–0	2–0	0–0	2–1	2–3
AEL	1–1		3–0	4–0	1–1	1–4	4–3	3–0	2–3	2–1	3–2	0–3	2–2	1–2
Anorthosis	1–0	5–0		1–1	2–2	1–1	6–1	1–0	2–0	0–0	1–0	2–0	1–1	2–1
APEP	2–1	1–2	0–1		0–3	1–2	1–2	1–2	0–2	0–2	1–1	1–3	0–0	0–5
APOEL	3–0	2–0	5–3	2–0		2–2	5–0	1–0	1–0	2–0	5–1	5–3	2–2	2–1
Apollon	3–0	2–0	3–1	5–1	1–1		4–0	3–2	2–1	3–0	4–0	5–1	4–0	0–0
APOP	1–2	1–3	1–2	3–1	0–1	0–1		1–3	3–2	0–2	7–1	1–1	3–3	1–2
Digenis	1–0	2–2	1–1	3–3	0–1	2–3	1–1		2–0	0–2	1–0	2–1	0–1	0–4
Ethnikos Achna	2–1	0–0	0–5	4–0	1–2	1–2	2–0	4–2		0–1	1–1	2–4	4–0	0–1
ENP	1–0	3–5	0–1	6–1	2–1	1–1	4–0	2–2	3–3		2–1	2–2	1–1	0–1
ENTHOI	1–4	1–2	0–6	0–0	0–7	1–4	0–3	1–1	0–6	0–1		1–2	0–2	0–5
Nea Salamina	3–2	2–1	2–5	5–0	0–2	2–2	2–1	4–1	2–1	0–2	3–1		5–1	0–1
Olympiakos	3–2	3–2	1–2	8–0	1–3	2–3	3–2	1–4	1–1	1–1	0–1	1–1		1–3
Omonia	3–1	2–0	2–2	2–1	1–0	1–1	4–0	3–0	3–2	0–1	2–1	6–2	1–0	

Legend: Blue = home team win; Yellow = draw; Red = away team win.

== Attendances ==
#	Club	Average
1	Omonoia	8,557
2	APOEL	7,460
3	Apollon Limassol	6,249
4	Anorthosis	5,296
5	AEL	3,743
6	Olympiakos Nicosia	1,703
7	Nea Salamina	1,665
8	AEK Larnaca	1,636
9	ENP	1,209
10	Ethnikos Achnas	1,146
11	Digenis	1,029
12	APOP	890
13	APEP	806
14	THOI	723

== See also ==
- Cypriot First Division
- 2005–06 Cypriot Cup
- List of top goalscorers in Cypriot First Division by season
- Cypriot football clubs in European competitions

== Sources ==
- "2005/06 Cypriot First Division". Rec.Sport.Soccer Statistics Foundation. 2016-01-14.
- "1. DIVISION 2005/2006". Soccerway.
