= APOEL Nicosia =

Multi-sports club in Cyprus

- Full name: Athletikos Podosferikos Omilos Ellinon Lefkosias
- Nickname: Τhrylos tis kyprou (The Legend of Cyprus)
- Founded: 8 November 1926; 99 years ago
- Colours: Yellow, Blue
- Chairman: Christoforos Potamitis
- Titles: 165
- Website: Club home page

APOEL (Greek: ΑΠΟΕΛ; short for Αθλητικός Ποδοσφαιρικός Όμιλος Ελλήνων Λευκωσίας, Athletikos Podosferikos Omilos Ellinon Lefkosias, "Athletic Football Club of Greeks of Nicosia") is a major Cypriot multi-sport club based in Nicosia.

APOEL, which was founded in 1926, is the most popular sports club in Cyprus and the most successful, achieving to win 165 official senior titles in several sports.

The club is parent to fourteen different competitive departments including football, basketball, volleyball, futsal, handball, table tennis, bowling, cycling, archery, swimming, water polo and a runners team.

== History ==
=== The early years ===
The club was formed as POEL (Greek: ΠΟΕΛ; Ποδοσφαιρικός Όμιλος Ελλήνων Λευκωσίας, Podosferikos Omilos Ellinon Lefkosias, Football Club of Greeks of Nicosia) on 8 November 1926. The club's formation came about when a group of forty people, with a common vision, met and set the foundations for creating a football club that would represent the Greek residents of the capital and express their deep desire for Cyprus' incorporation (enosis) into Greece. The meeting took place at a traditional confectionery, owned by Charalambos Hadjioannou, downtown in Ledra Street and the first president of the club was Giorgos Poulias. The first clubhouse was the "Athenians Club" (Λέσχη Αθηναίων) at the end of Ledra Street.

After a journey to the football club in Alexandria, Egypt in 1927 the General Assembly of 1928 decided the players showed that they were not just good footballers but also excellent track and field athletes. Hence it was decided to create a track and field team in addition to the football team. The name APOEL was adopted to reflect this, with the 'A' standing for 'Athletic'. Soon after more sports departments were established, including volleyball, table tennis, rugby football, boxing, cycling, field hockey and basketball (a few years later). Also the club issued a sports newspaper, the "Athlitiki Echo", the first Cypriot sport newspaper.

=== The foundation of CFA and the club's first ever official title ===
Cyprus did not have any country-wide league until 1932. Football clubs of the time played friendly matches only. In 1932, Pezoporikos Larnaca organised an unofficial league, the first island-wide league, and it was won by APOEL after defeating AEL Limassol in the final by 4–0. In 1934, there was a disagreement between Trust and Anorthosis Famagusta on the organisation of the fourth unofficial league. APOEL and AEL Limassol organised a meeting for the foundation of a country-wide governing body and an official country-wide league. The meeting took place in APOEL's clubhouse on 23 September and the establishment of the Cyprus Football Association was agreed. Two years later the APOEL football team celebrated its first championship title of the official Cyprus football league.

=== The 1948 conflicts ===
Politics, however, would soon spark conflict within the team. On 23 May 1948 the board of the club send a telegram to the Hellenic Association of Amateur Athletics (Greek: Σ.Ε.Γ.Α.Σ.), with the opportunity of the annual Panhellenic Track and Field Competition, which included wishes that "the rebellion" is finished. Several leftist club members perceived the telegram as a political comment on the Greek Civil War and they distanced themselves from the club. A few days later, on 4 June 1948, they founded Omonia, which until today is the arch rival of APOEL and there has been a traditional animosity between the fans of the two teams.

=== 1955–59 period ===
More conflicts led to further struggles for APOEL. Athletes belonging to the club frequently participated in national clashes. During the 1955–59 national uprising against the British, many of APOEL's athletes and members of the club were active members of EOKA (the National Organisation of Cypriot Fighters), the most outstanding example being the club's track and field athlete Michalakis Karaolis who was hanged by the British colonial authorities. During this period the football team had their closest brush with relegation as most football players were actively taking part in the national struggle.

=== The formation of APOEL FC Company ===
APOEL Football (Public) Ltd was established in May 1997, after the decision of APOEL committee. This had a significant effect on the club because it separated the activities of the football team from those of the sports club. The formation of the company was necessitated by the financial difficulties the team faced at the time. The company began its operations with a capital of CY £600,000. The company's main activity is the management, operation and commercial exploitation of APOEL Football Club. The company owns all the rights for the football department under an agreement with APOEL sports club and pays the club CY£100,000 annually for the privilege. The agreement between the company and the club is renewed every five years. The company has 1745 shareholders and besides the football club, also maintains a team boutique (Orange Shop), the APOELFC (Greek: ΑΠΟΕΛFC) magazine and the apoelfc.com.cy website among others.

== Colours and badge ==
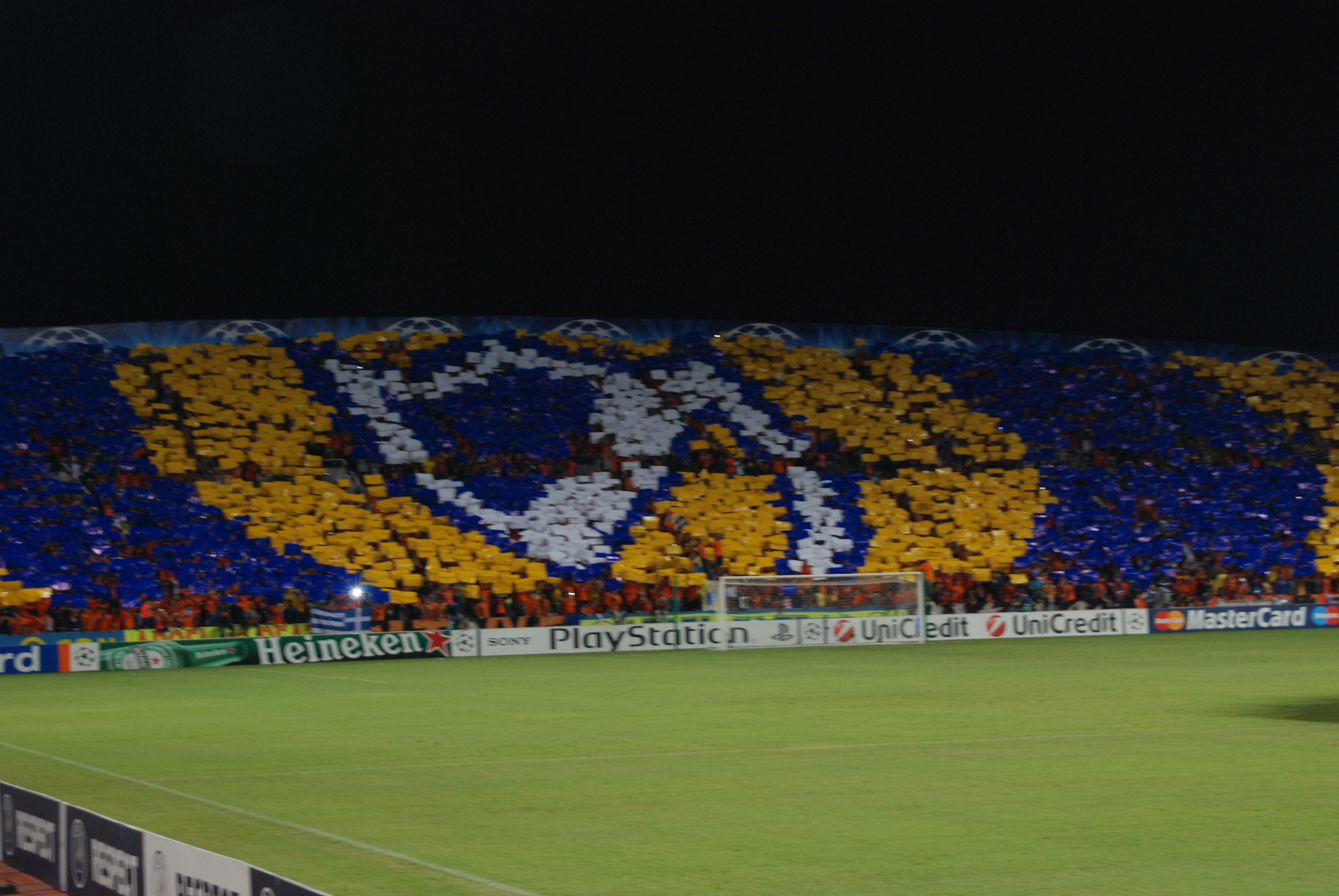
The club's colours and badge displayed by APOEL fans a Champions League match against Chelsea.

APOEL's colours are blue and yellow. Blue symbolizes Greece and yellow symbolizes Byzantium. The logo is a blue and yellow shield with the name of the club written diagonally in blue.

The football club badge has a small difference on it. The badge has remained the same since the establishment of the club, but after the football team of APOEL won their 20th championship (2008–09 season), two stars were added above the football club's logo to symbolize the 20 championship titles (one star for every ten championships won).

== Supporters ==
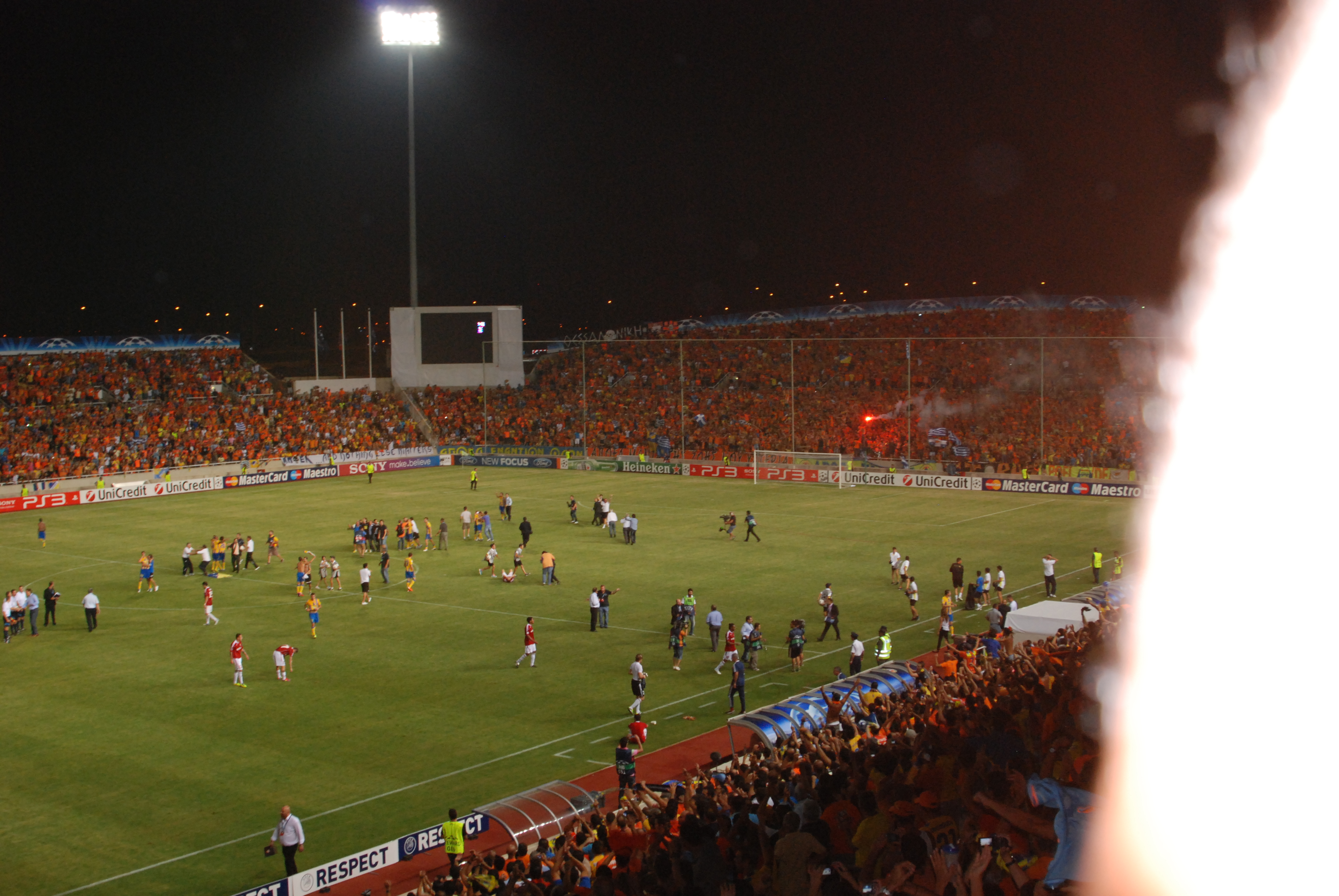
APOEL fans celebrating after eliminating Wisła Kraków and reached the Champions League group stage.

APOEL fans are right-wing in their majority and there are strong ties for several organised fans and right-wing political parties.

The main supporter group is PAN.SY.FI (Greek: ΠΑΝ.ΣΥ.ΦΙ). PAN.SY.FI was founded in 1979 and has branches in all major cities in Cyprus and also in other countries. The PAN.SY.FI (and most ultras) wear orange jackets (or T-shirts). The first game they sported the orange jackets was during the first round game of the 1992–93 championship against AEL Limassol in Makario Stadium. APOEL have reserved the shirt number 79 in honour of PAN.SY.FI. (APOEL Ultras), to denote the year the group was founded, 1979.

== Stadiums ==
APOEL football club's home ground since 23 October 1999, is the 22,859 seater GSP Stadium. It is the largest stadium in Cyprus and they share it with local rivals Omonia and Olympiakos Nicosia. Before moving to GSP Stadium, APOEL used as home grounds the Makario Stadium (from 1978 until 1999) and the old GSP Stadium (prior to 1978).

The club's basketball, volleyball and futsal teams host their matches in the 2,100 seater Lefkotheo Indoor Arena which was built in 1980. For many years the basketball team used as home venue the 6,000 capacity Eleftheria Indoor Hall.

== 1926 - APOEL's official magazine ==
1926 is the official magazine of the multi-sports club APOEL. A Cyprus monthly sports magazine published in Nicosia, it was founded in 2013 with its first edition appearing on 7 March 2013. The magazine is named after the founding year of the club and covers all of APOEL's teams (football, basketball, futsal, volleyball, water polo), as well as individual sports (archery, bowling, cycling, running, swimming, table tennis), with feature stories, interviews, retro, and presentations. The main focus is on football, since that sport is the most popular in Cyprus.

== Presidential history ==
APOEL has had numerous presidents over the course of their history. Since the establishment of APOEL Football Ltd, the presidents of the board of directors of the company (chairmen) have assumed all presidential duties for the football club. Here are complete lists of both:

Presidents:

- 1926–1958 – Georgios Poulias
- 1958–1967 – Εfthyvoulos Αnthoullis
- 1967–1968 – Michalakis Triantafyllides
- 1968–1969 – Takis Skarparis
- 1969–1971 – Constantinos Loukos
- 1971–1974 – Michalakis Zivanaris
- 1974–1975 – Kikis Lazarides
- 1975–1983 – Iakovos Filippou
- 1983–1988 – Michalakis Zivanaris
- 1988–1991 – Andreas Papaellinas
- 1991–1992 – Kykkos Fotiades
- 1992–1994 – Mike Ioannides
- 1994–1996 – Christos Triantafyllides
- 1996–1999 – Ouranios Ioannides
- 1999–2000 – Dinos Palmas
- 2002–2004 – Dinos Fisentzides
- 2004–2007 – Yiannos Ioannou
- 2007–2008 – Costas Schizas
- 2008–2009 – Christodoulos Ellinas
- 2009–2011 – Prodromos Petrides
- 2011–2012 – Aris Vasilopoulos
- 2012–2014 – Christoforos Potamitis
- 2014–2016 – Marios Charalambous
- 2016–present – Christoforos Potamitis

Chairmen:

- 1997–1998 – Mike Ioannides
- 1998–2000 – Christos Triantafyllides
- 2000–2001 – Harris Papanastasiou
- 2001–2006 – Prodromos Petrides
- 2006–2008 – Kyriakos Zivanaris
- 2008–2013 – Phivos Erotokritou
- 2013–present – Prodromos Petrides

== APOEL Football ==
APOEL Football Club is a professional football club based in Nicosia, Cyprus. They are one of the founding members of the Cyprus Football Association. APOEL are the most successful football team in Cyprus with an overall tally of 26 championships, 21 cups and 13 super cups. APOEL's greatest moment in the European competitions occurred in the season 2011–12, when the club participated in the group stages of the 2011–12 UEFA Champions League (along with FC Porto, Shakhtar Donetsk and Zenit St. Petersburg) and achieved qualification for the quarter-finals of the competition by topping the group and eliminating Olympique Lyonnais in the last 16, becoming the only Cypriot club to reach the UEFA Champions League quarter-finals. APOEL's European competitions highlights include also appearances in the group stages of the 2009–10 & 2014–15 UEFA Champions League and the group stages of the 2013–14 & 2015–16 UEFA Europa League. They marked their most successful UEFA Europa League campaign during the 2016–17 season, when they managed to top their group (along with Olympiacos, Young Boys and Astana) and eliminated Athletic Bilbao in the round of 32, to reach the last 16 of the competition for the first time in their history. APOEL is the only Cypriot club who have reached the group stages (and the knockout stages) of both major UEFA competitions (UEFA Champions League & UEFA Europa League). APOEL FC is also an ordinary member of the European Club Association, an organization that replaced the previous G-14 which consists of major football clubs in Europe.

=== Honours ===
- Cypriot Championship

Winners (28) (record): 1935–36, 1936–37, 1937–38, 1938–39, 1939–40, 1946–47, 1947–48, 1948–49, 1951–52, 1964–65, 1972–73, 1979–80, 1985–86, 1989–90, 1991–92, 1995–96, 2001–02, 2003–04, 2006–07, 2008–09, 2010–11, 2012–13, 2013–14, 2014–15, 2015–16, 2016–17, 2017–18, 2018–19

- Cypriot Cup

Winners (21) (record): 1936–37, 1940–41, 1946–47, 1950–51, 1962–63, 1967–68, 1968–69, 1972–73, 1975–76, 1977–78, 1978–79, 1983–84, 1992–93, 1994–95, 1995–96, 1996–97, 1998–99, 2005–06, 2007–08, 2013–14, 2014–15

- Cypriot Super Cup

Winners (13): 1963, 1984, 1986, 1992, 1993, 1996, 1997, 2002, 2004, 2008, 2009, 2011, 2013

== APOEL FC Football Academies ==
- Cypriot U21 Championships:
- Cyprus U21 Cup:
- Cypriot U19 Championships:
- Cypriot U17 Championships:
- Cypriot U16 Championships:
- Cypriot U15 Championships:
- Cypriot U13 Championships:

== APOEL Basketball ==
APOEL Basketball Club is a professional basketball team based in the city of Nicosia, Cyprus. APOEL's basketball team was formed in 1947 and is one of the most successful basketball clubs in Cyprus by winning 11 Championships, 12 Cups and 11 Super Cups.

The team's first ever basketball title was the Cypriot Super Cup that won in 1972. At the end of the same season (1972–73), APOEL won their second title, the Cypriot Cup. The team achieved to win their first ever Championship title three years later, in season 1975–76. The 90's decade was the most successful for APOEL. The team won 4 Championships, 5 Cups and 4 Super Cups during that period, including one double on the 1995–96 season.

After winning the double in 2001–02 season, APOEL managed to win again the Championship in 2008–09 season, after 6 years without winning any title. The next season (2009–10), the team won their second consecutive Championship title and reached the quarterfinals of the FIBA EuroChallenge, marking their most successful campaign in the European competitions. After four years without winning any title, APOEL managed to win again the Championship in 2013–14 season, which was their 11th league title in their history. During 2015–16 season, APOEL managed to win their 12th Cypriot Cup trophy, thirteen years after they won their last Cypriot Cup title. The next season (2016–17), APOEL returned in the European competitions after a five years break and managed to reach the second round (Last 24) of the FIBA Europe Cup, marking one of their most successful seasons in the European competitions.

=== Honours ===
- Cypriot Championship

Winners (11): 1975–76, 1978–79, 1980–81, 1994–95, 1995–96, 1997–98, 1998–99, 2001–02, 2008–09, 2009–10, 2013–14

- Cypriot Cup

Winners (12) (record): 1972–73, 1978–79, 1983–84, 1985–86, 1990–91, 1992–93, 1993–94, 1994–95, 1995–96, 2001–02, 2002–03, 2015–16

- Cypriot Super Cup

Winners (11) (record): 1972, 1976, 1986, 1994, 1995, 1996, 1998, 2001, 2002, 2010, 2014

=== APOEL Women's basketball team ===
APOEL also maintains a women's team which is competing in the Women's Cypriot First Division. In their most successful seasons, APOEL Women's team reached the Championship finals twice (2003–04 & 2004–05) and qualified two times for the semi-finals of the Cup (2004–05 & 2006–07).

== APOEL Volleyball ==
APOEL Volleyball Club is a professional volleyball team based in the city of Nicosia, Cyprus. APOEL's volleyball team was formed in 1928 and won 10 championships (4 held by the Cypriot Local Committee for Sports and 6 held by the Cyprus Volleyball Federation) and 5 Cups. The 1980s was the most successful decade for the team, winning 6 Championships and 5 Cups between 1979 and 1985. Also, the decade of the 1990s was amazing for the youth teams of APOEL (U15, U17, U21) by winning 16 trophies in just 7 years.

Since then, the team had some good seasons with participations in 2003–04 CEV Top Teams Cup and 2004–05 CEV Cup, but without any title outcome. In the 2008–09 season APOEL relegated to the Second Division and suspended its activities due to financial difficulties. That was the first and only time which a team from APOEL multisport club was relegated.

In season 2012–13, the volleyball club of APOEL was reactivated and participated in the Cypriot Second Division. They became champions by winning all their league matches (15 wins out of 15 matches) and promoted to the Cypriot First Division for the 2013–14 season.

=== Honours ===
- Cypriot Championship

Winners (10): 1968–69, 1969–70, 1970–71, 1971–72, 1978–79, 1979–80, 1980–81, 1982–83, 1983–84, 1984–85

- Cypriot Cup

Winners (5): 1978–79, 1980–81, 1981–82, 1983–84, 1984–85

- Cypriot Second Division

Winners (1): 2012–13

=== APOEL Women's volleyball team ===
APOEL women's volleyball team was formed in 1974. The women's team won their only title in 1977, when they managed to win AEL Limassol 3–2 in the season's Cup final. The team suspended its operation in 1990, due to financial problems.

=== Honours ===
- Women's Cup

Winners (1): 1976–77

== APOEL Futsal ==
APOEL Futsal is a professional futsal team based in the city of Nicosia, Cyprus. APOEL is one of the most successful futsal clubs in Cyprus with an overall tally of 3 Championships, 3 Cups and 1 Super Cup. APOEL's futsal team was formed in 2012 as APOEL City Futsal F.S.C., after APOEL board came to an agreement with City Futsal F.S.C. to take their place in the Cypriot First Division for the 2012–13 season. The team had a successful first season, finishing fourth in the league and reaching the semi-finals of the cup. One year after its establishment, the club was renamed to APOEL. In the 2013–14 season, the team achieved their first domestic double, winning both the season's Cypriot First Division and the Cypriot Cup, their first two major trophies after only two years of existence as a futsal club. The next season (2014–15), APOEL became double winners for second year in a row, after winning again the Cypriot First Division and the Cypriot Cup. During the 2015–16 season, APOEL achieved a historical domestic treble by winning all the Cypriot competitions trophies, the league, the cup and the super cup.

=== European campaigns ===
After winning the double in the 2013–14 season, APOEL qualified for the first time for the European competitions, participating in the 2014–15 UEFA Futsal Cup. They entered the preliminary round of the competition and they hosted all the Group D matches in Nicosia's Tasos Papadopoulos - Eleftheria Indoor Hall. APOEL managed to qualify for the main round by winning all their matches, beating FC Anzhi Tallinn 5–3, KF Flamurtari Vlorë 9–1 and NAFI Stuttgart 10–1. APOEL were eventually eliminated at the main round of the UEFA Futsal Cup, finishing in the third place of Group 6 with 4 points, after losing 1–5 against Slov-Matic Bratislava, beating MVFC Berettjóújfalu 3–2 and drawing 3–3 with Vegakameratene.

In the 2016–17 season, APOEL participated for the third consecutive time in the UEFA Futsal Cup. They entered the preliminary round of the competition and they managed to qualify for the main round by winning AFM Maniacs 9–7, JB Gentofte 4–3 and drawing 7–7 with the hosts ASUE Yerevan. APOEL were eventually eliminated at the main round of the UEFA Futsal Cup, finishing in the third place of Group 6 with 4 points, after drawing 3–3 with City'US Târgu Mureș, losing 0–7 against Era-Pack Chrudim and beating 6–5 ŠK Pinerola Bratislava.

=== Honours ===
- Cypriot Championship

Winners (3): 2013–14, 2014–15, 2015–16

- Cypriot Cup

Winners (3): 2013–14, 2014–15, 2015–16

- Cypriot Super Cup

Winners (1): 2015

== APOEL Table tennis ==
APOEL's table tennis team was formed in 1927 and in 1936 they organized tournaments with the participation of athletes from other clubs. Since 1950, they organized Open Championships since no formal federation existed. On 1 July 1963, at the initiative of APOEL and the founding members of the Pancyprian Gymnasium, the English School of Nicosia and the club officials of Cyprus Telecommunications Authority, they founded the Cypriot Federation (POEPA), which organized the first tournaments in which APOEL dominated. In 1970, APOEL's women's department was founded, which was the first women's table tennis team in Cyprus. Great APOEL's table tennis athletes were Michalakis Zambas who won 6 consecutive titles and Stavros Louras.

=== Honours ===
- Cypriot Championship

Winners (10): 1974, 1978, 1979, 1980, 1981, 1983, 1986, 1988, 1989, 1990

- Cypriot Cup

Winners (9): 1978, 1979, 1980, 1981, 1982, 1983, 1987, 1988, 2010

== APOEL Racing (Cycling) ==
APOEL's cycling department was founded in 1970. The early years, the club's athletes participated in domestic games, as Cypriot federation – in which APOEL was one of the founding members – was established much later in 1978. APOEL's athletes participated for the first time in an international match in 1979, taking part in the international round of Israel. The next year, they participated in the ascent of Parnitha, where Spyros Agrotis finished first in adolescents and 4th in the overall score, achieving the first international victory for APOEL. The same athlete won the silver medal at the Games of the Small States of Europe in 1985.

APOEL had great athletes in cycling, but the greatest was Spyros Agrotis who won the Cypriot championship six times (1979, 1980, 1981, 1984, 1987, 1990) and also won one bronze (in 1985) and two silver medals (in 1989) in the Games of the Small States of Europe. Other great APOEL's cycling athletes were Andreas Agrotis (champion in 1985, 1988, 1989, 1991, 1993, 1994, 1995, 1996, 1997), Giorgos Chatzimarkou (champion in 1986). Also Pancyprian titles have been won by Nicos Demetriou, Michalis Chadjioannou, Alexis Charalambous, Sotiris Stavrou, Giorgos Kallidis and Eftychios Kasapis.

=== Honours ===
- Cypriot Men's Championship

Winners (20): 1978, 1979, 1980, 1981, 1982, 1984, 1985, 1986, 1988, 1989, 1990, 1991, 1993, 1994, 1995, 1996, 1997, 1998, 2001, 2014

- Cypriot Cup

Winners (4): 1996, 1997, 1998, 1999

== APOEL Bowling ==
APOEL's Bowling team first official trophy came in the 2015–16 season, when the team managed to win the Cypriot Bowling Cup. The next season the team repeated their achievement by winning their second consecutive bowling Cup title.

=== Honours ===
- Cypriot Cup

Winners (2): 2015–16, 2016–17

== APOEL Water polo ==
APOEL Water polo team was founded in 2014. The team competes in the Cypriot Water polo Championship and in the Cypriot Cup. In 2019 APOEL became the first club to represent Cyprus in a continental competition (the 2019–20 LEN Euro Cup).

Honours

   Cypriot Championship

   Winners (5): 2019, 2020, 2023, 2024, 2025

   Cypriot Cup

   Winners (4): 2018, 2019, 2020, 2021

== APOEL Archery ==
APOEL archery team was founded in 2013 and maintains men's, women's and youth academies archery departments.

== APOEL Handball ==
APOEL handball team was founded in 2017 after they merged with SPE Strovolos, and competes in the Cyprus 1st Division Handball league under the name "APOEL/SPES".

== Track and field department ==
APOEL cultivated athletics since 1926, immediately after the founding of the club. The first track and field athletes were the footballers of the club, as four players of APOEL had taken part at the Panhellenic games in Limassol. The Cyprus Open Championships where established in 1945 and until 1968, APOEL won all the competitions except one. The Open Championships were abolished in 1968 and they were replaced by Diagoreia, in the memory of the old agent and founding member of APOEL Diagoras Nicolaides. In 1976, all Cypriot clubs suspended the operations of their athletics sections since all athletes joined the provincial associations.

== Boxing department ==
One of APOEL's first departments was boxing. Great athletes of APOEL's boxing were Kovis Ioannides and Petrakis Loizides.

== Rugby team ==
APOEL's rugby team was in the first departments of the club in 1926. The team's operation lasted a few weeks because the current years the dry pitches did not favor the development of sport in Cyprus.

== Field hockey team ==
APOEL's field hockey team was founded before the Second World War and participated in all three Cypriot leagues, which were organized with their greatest rival AYMA. The team was dissolved in 1949. Players of APOEL's field hockey team in 1930 were P. Savvides, N. Kyriakidis, Chr. Savvides, Chr. Symeonidis, N. Petrides, G. Xenophontos, P. Michaelides, I. Ioannides, K. Tsimmilis, E. Yannakakis and M. Constantinides.
