= 2017–18 Cyprus Volleyball Division 1 =

- League: Cyprus Volleyball Division 1
- Sport: Volleyball
- Duration: 13 October 2017 – April 2018
- Number of teams: 8
- TV partner(s): RIK

Regular Season

Cyprus Volleyball Division 1 seasons
- ← 2016–17 2018–19 →

The 2017–18 Cyprus Volleyball Division 1 is the 40th season of the Cyprus Volleyball Division 1, the highest tier professional volley league in Cyprus. Omonia were the defending champions.

== Regular season ==
The Regular season of the 2017–18 Cyprus Volleyball Division 1 is held in a round robin format. At season finish, teams occupying positions 1-6 advance to 2017-18 Volleyleague Play-offs.

Pos	Team	Pld	Wins				Defeats				Set		Pts	Rst
Pos	Team	Pld	Ovr	3-0	3-1	3-2	Ovr	2-3	1-3	0-3	W	L	Pts	Rst
1	Pafiakos	14	12	6	5	1	2	2	0	0	40	13	37	Qualified to the Playoffs
2	Omonia	14	12	6	6	0	2	0	0	2	36	12	36	Qualified to the Playoffs
3	Nea Salamina	14	9	6	2	1	5	1	3	1	32	19	27	Qualified to the Playoffs
4	Anorthosis	14	8	2	5	1	6	1	1	4	27	25	24	Qualified to the Playoffs
5	APOEL	14	8	4	1	3	6	1	2	3	28	25	22	Qualified to the Playouts
6	Anagennisi Deryneia	14	4	2	1	1	10	2	4	4	20	33	13	Qualified to the Playouts
7	AEK Karava	14	3	1	1	1	11	0	6	5	15	36	8	Qualified to the Playouts
8	Olympias Frenarou	14	0	0	0	0	14	1	5	8	7	42	1	Qualified to the Playouts

Source: CVF

== Play-off (1-4) ==
The four teams that finished in the places 1 to 4 in the Regular season, compete in the Play-off (1-4). Omonia started the playoffs with handicap 2–0, and Pafiakos and Anorthosis at 1–1. At the final, Pafiakos started with handicap 2–0. The team with four wins in overall is the winner.

Semifinals
1	Pafiakos	3	3	3
4	Anorthosis	0	0	1
2	Omonia	3	3
3	Nea Salamina	1	1

Final
1	Pafiakos	3	1
2	Omonia	0	3

== Play-out (5-8) ==
The four teams that finished in the places 5 to 8 in the Regular season, compete in the Play-out (5-8). APOEL started the playoffs with handicap 2–0, and Anagennisi and AEK Karava at 1–1. At the final, APOEL started with handicap 2–0. The team with four wins in overall is the winner.

Semifinals
5	APOEL	3	3
8	Olympias Frenarou	2	1
6	Anagennisi Deryneia	3	1	0	1
7	AEK Karava	1	3	3	3

Final
5	APOEL	3
7	AEK Karava	1

== Sources ==
- Cyprus Volleyball Federation
