= Robert Mallios Galić =

Greek footballer and coach

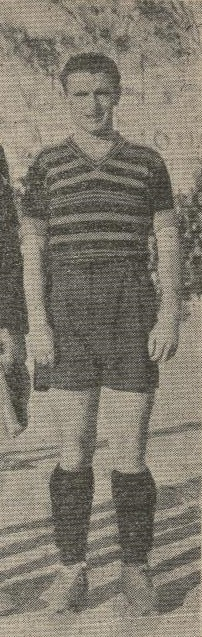
- Mallios in 1932

Personal information
- Full name: Milan Galić
- Date of birth: 1905
- Place of birth: Constantinople, Ottoman Empire
- Date of death: December 1973 (aged 67–68)
- Place of death: Cyprus
- Position: Defender

Senior career*
Years	Team	Apps	(Gls)
1923−1928	Hefestos Constantinople		
1928−1933	AEK Athens	37	(9)
1933−1936	Enosis Neon Trust (player-manager)		

International career
1930–1933	Greece	12	(1)

Managerial career
- 1936−1937: Lefkoşa Türk Spor Kulübü
- 1937−1940: Pezoporikos
- * Club domestic league appearances and goals

Robert Mallios Galić (Greek: Ροβέρτος Μάλλιος Γκάλιτς; 1905 – December 1973), known as "Mallios" in short, was a Greek footballer who played as a defender and a later manager.

His name was frequently misrepresented in published sources. Although he was commonly referred to as "Robert Mallios Galić", Galić was his only surname. Both of his parents were of Serbian descent and Mallios was not a second surname, but a Greek rendering of the Serbian diminutive Miljo, derived from his given name, Milan. Among the Greek-speaking community of Constantinople, where Galić was born and raised, Miljo became corrupted into Mallios, the name by which he was known throughout his football career. The forename Robert originated from confusion with the first name of his brother, who was also a footballer and his teammate in Constantinople and later at AEK Athens.

== Club career ==
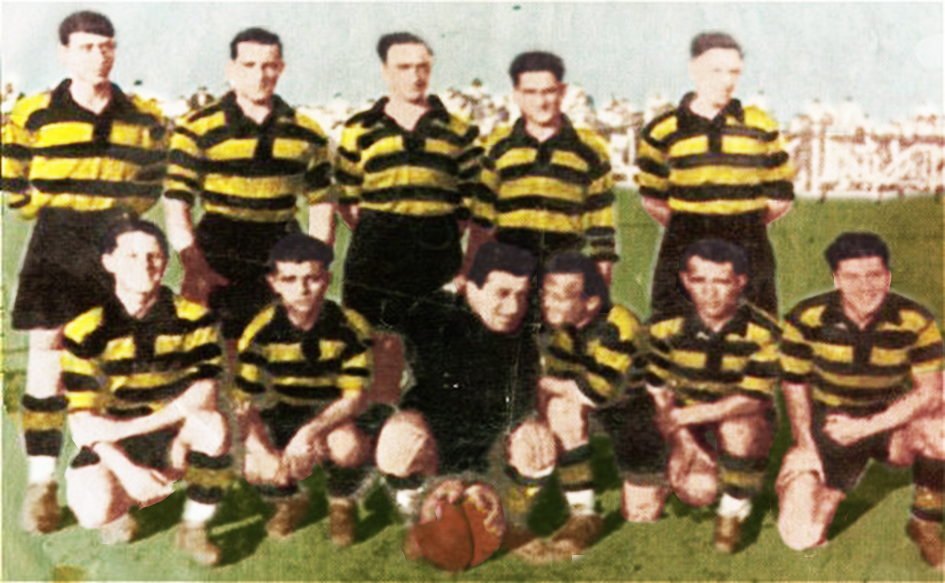
AEK at the 1931 Cup final.

Mallios started his career in 1923 at Hefestos Constantinople. In 1928 he moved to Greece and signed for AEK Athens, where competed as an expatriate. There, he was reunited with his teammates at Hefestos, Giorgos Giamalis, Nikos Baltas and Christos Argyropoulos. He was one of the main defenders of the club and in 1931 he won the first Greek Cup, that was also the first title for the club, defeating Aris 5–3.

On 27 September 1933 he went to Cyprus and joined Enosis Neon Trust for a season, where he was both their captain and manager. He won both the first Cypriot Championship and the first two Cypriot Cups, helping his team become the first to achieve a domestic double in Cypriot football. He ended his playing career in 1936, at the age of 31.

== International career ==
Mallios played 12 times for Greece and scored once, between 1930 and 1933, where he also was their captain on occasion. His debut took place on 2 March 1930 in an away friendly match against Italy B. On 13 December 1931, he scored his only goal in the blue-and-white shirt when he opened the score with a well-placed penalty in a home friendly 2–4 defeat against Hungary B. He became the first footballer of AEK Athens to score a goal with the national team.

== Managerial career ==
After Mallios left Enosis Neon Trust he coached Lefkoşa Türk Spor Kulübü for a season and in 1937 he took charge at Pezoporikos until 1940, which was the last stop of his career.

== Honours ==
=== As a player ===
AEK Athens

- Greek Cup: 1931–32

=== As a player-manager ===
Enosis Neon Trust

- Cypriot First Division: 1934–35 Cypriot First Division
- Cypriot Cup: 1934–35 Cypriot Cup, 1935–36 Cypriot Cup
