= List of football clubs in Cyprus by major honours won =

This is a list of the major honours won by football clubs in Cyprus. It lists every Cypriot association football club to have won any of the major domestic trophies, the Cypriot League, the Cypriot Cup and the Cypriot Super Cup, since Cypriot clubs have not won any major official European competition yet.

Numbers in bold are record totals for that category. Clubs in italics are Double winners: they have won two or more of these trophies in the same season (excluding super cups). Trophies that were shared between two clubs are counted as honours for both teams. Clubs tied in total honours are listed chronologically by most recent honour won.

Last updated on 3 September 2026.

Club	League	Cup	Super Cup	Total	Last trophy
APOEL	**29**	**21**	15	**65**	2024 Super Cup
Omonia Nicosia	22	16	**17**	55	2026 League
Anorthosis Famagusta	13	11	6	30	2021 Cup
AEL Limassol	6	7	4	17	2019 Cup
Apollon Limassol	4	9	4	17	2022 Super Cup
AEK Larnaca (Note: Includes wins of EPA Larnaca FC and Pezoporikos Larnaca FC until 1994.)	5	9	3	17	2025 Super Cup
Çetinkaya	1	2	3	6	1954 Super Cup
Olympiakos Nicosia	3	1	1	5	1977 Cup
Trust	1	3	0	4	1938 Cup
Pafos	1	2	1	4	2026 Super Cup
Nea Salamina Famagusta	0	1	1	2	1990 Super Cup
Aris Limassol	1	0	1	2	2023 Super Cup
APOP Kinyras	0	1	0	1	2009 Cup
Ermis Aradippou	0	0	1	1	2014 Super Cup

Notes:

- Following a decision by the Executive Committee of the Cyprus Football Association (CFA/KOP), upon the opinion of its legal advisor, on 19th June 2025, a request by AEK Larnaca was approved for the recognition of the titles of EPA Larnaca and Pezoporikos Larnaca in the name of AEK Larnaca.

== See also ==
- List of football clubs by competitive honours won

== Sources ==
- Rec.Sport.Soccer Statistics Foundation (Championships)
- Rec.Sport.Soccer Statistics Foundation (Cups)
- Rec.Sport.Soccer Statistics Foundation (Super Cups)
