= Omid Homayoun =

Cypriot volleyball and beach volleyball player

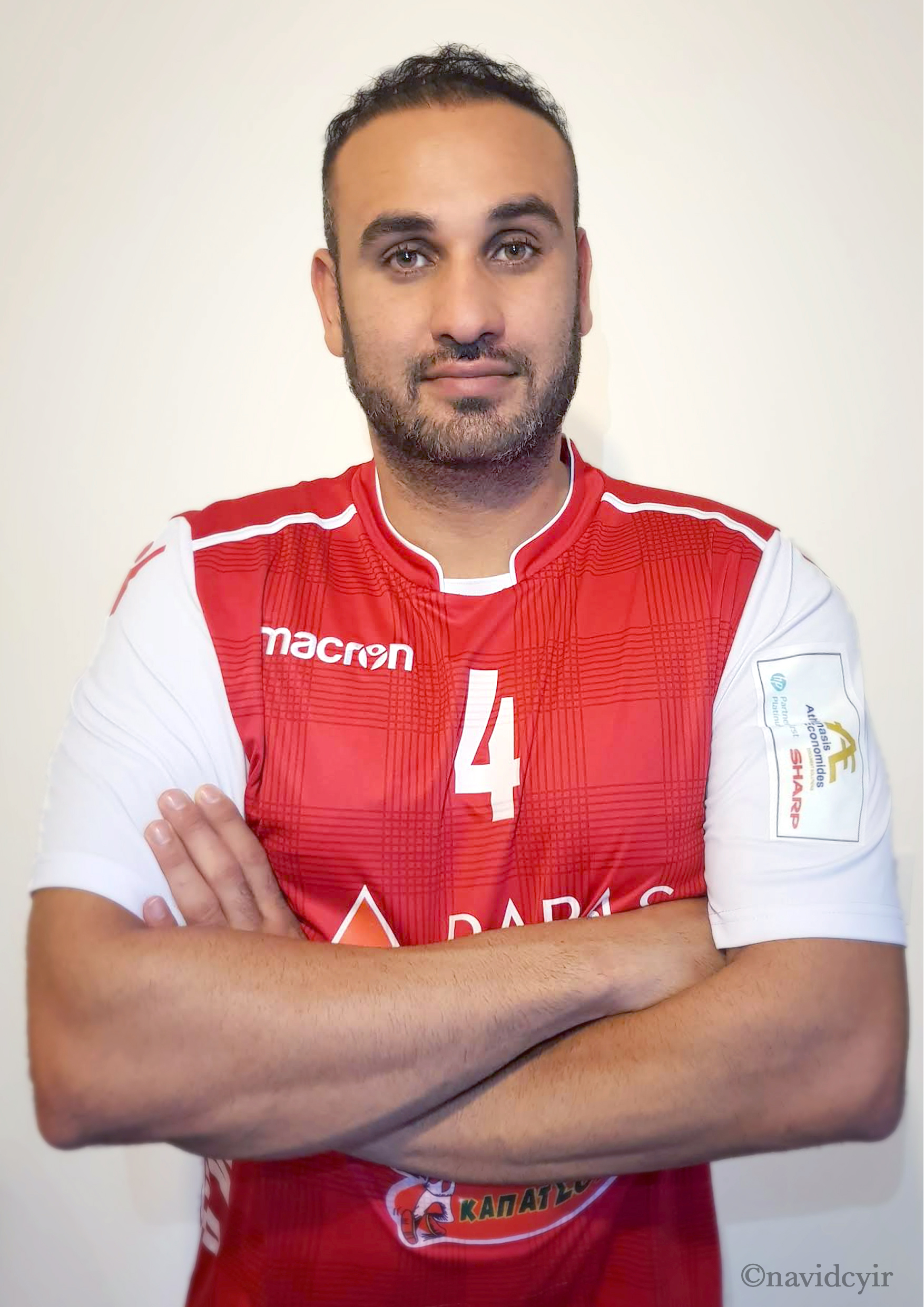
- Homayoun in 2020

Personal information
- Full name: Omid Homayoun
- Nationality: Cypriot
- Height: 1.92 m (6 ft 4 in)

Volleyball information
- Position: Outside hitter
- Current club: Nea Salaminas VC
- Number: 4

Career
Years	Teams
2018-2019; 2017–2018; 2016–2017; 2015–2016; 2013–2015; 2011–2013; 2010–2011; 2009–2010; 2002–2008	Apoel V.C. Nicosia; Apoel V.C. Nicosia; Anagennisis Deryneia; Pigasos V.C. Athens; Pallini V.C. Athens; Omonia V.C. Olympiada Neapolis V.C. UCY V.C. Omonia V.C.

Omid Homayoun (Greek: Ομiντ Χομαγιούν) is a Cypriot professional volleyball and beach volleyball player currently playing for Nea Salaminas VC in Limassol Cyprus.

He has also been an active member of Cyprus Volleyball Federation (CVF) (Greek: Kυπριακή Oμοσπονδία Πετοσφαίρισης, Κ.Ο.ΠΕ) since 2002 and his home club is Omonia V.C.

== Athletic career ==
He has been a player for top volleyball clubs in Cyprus including Apoel Volleyball Club, as well as assistant coach for women teams, and university teams during his athletic career.

Omid is right-handed and is an outside hitter. His early volleyball career started in Nicosia where he played for Omonia V.C. youth team in 2002. He then progressed to play with the main team in Cyprus main volleyball division. His international volleyball career is playing for two volleyball clubs in Athens, Greece.
