= 2016–17 Cyprus Volleyball Division 1 =

- League: Cyprus Volleyball Division 1
- Sport: Volleyball
- Duration: 21 October 2016 – 8 April 2017
- Teams: 8
- TV partner: RIK

Regular Season

Finals
- Champions: Omonia
- Runners-up: Pafiakos

Cyprus Volleyball Division 1 seasons
- ← 2015–16 2017–18 →

The 2016–17 Cyprus Volleyball Division 1 was the 40th season of the Cyprus Volleyball Division 1, the highest tier professional volley league in Cyprus. Omonia were the defending champions.

== Regular season ==
The Regular season of the 2016–17 Cyprus Volleyball Division 1 is held in a round robin format. At season finish, teams occupying positions 1-6 advance to 2016-17 Volleyleague Play-offs.

=== League table ===
Pos	Team	Pld	Wins				Defeats				Set		Pts	Rst
Pos	Team	Pld	Ovr	3-0	3-1	3-2	Ovr	2-3	1-3	0-3	W	L	Pts	Rst
1	Pafiakos	14	11	7	3	1	3	0	3	0	36	14	32	Qualified to the Playoffs
2	Omonia	14	10	6	4	0	4	1	2	1	34	16	31	Qualified to the Playoffs
3	Nea Salamina	14	8	5	2	1	6	2	2	2	30	22	25	Qualified to the Playoffs
4	APOEL	14	8	3	4	1	6	0	3	3	27	24	23	Qualified to the Playoffs
5	Anorthosis	14	7	4	2	1	7	3	2	2	29	25	23	Qualified to the Playouts
6	Anagennisi Deryneia	14	8	3	3	2	6	0	2	4	26	25	22	Qualified to the Playouts
7	AEK Karava	14	4	1	3	0	10	0	5	5	17	33	12	Qualified to the Playouts
8	Enosis Neon Paralimni	14	0	0	0	0	14	0	2	12	2	42	0	Qualified to the Playouts

Source: CVF

== Play-off (1-4) ==
The four teams that finished in the places 1 to 4 in the Regular season, compete in the Play-off (1-4). Pafiakos started the playoffs with handicap, 1-0, Omonia and Nea Salamina at 1-1.

Semifinals
1	Pafiakos	3	3
4	APOEL	0	1
2	Omonia	3	3	3
3	Nea Salamina	0	1	0

Final
1	Pafiakos	2	0	0
2	Omonia	3	3	3

== Play-out (5-8) ==
The four teams that finished in the places 5 to 8 in the Regular season, compete in the Play-out (5-8). Anorthosis and Anagennisi started the playoffs with a handicap, 1-0.

Semifinals
5	Anorthosis	3	3
8	Enosis Neon Paralimni	1	0
6	Anagennisi Deryneia	3	1	3
7	AEK Karava	2	3	1

Final
5	Anorthosis	0	3	1	3	2
6	Anagennisi Deryneia	3	1	3	1	3

== Final standings ==
Qualified for the 2017–18 CEV Champions League
Qualified for the 2017–18 CEV Challenge Cup
Relegated to the 2017–18 Cyprus Volleyball Division 2

Rank	Team
1st place, gold medalist(s)	Omonia
2nd place, silver medalist(s)	Pafiakos
3rd place, bronze medalist(s)	Nea Salamina
4	APOEL
5	Anagennisi Deryneia
6	Anorthosis
7	AEK Karava
8	Enosis Neon Paralimni
