= 1936–37 Cypriot Cup =

Tournament details
- Country: Cyprus
- Dates: 24 January 1937 – 28 February 1937
- Teams: 7

Final positions
- Champions: APOEL (1st title)
- Runners-up: Enosis Neon Trust

The 1936–37 Cypriot Cup was the third edition of the Cypriot Cup. A total of 7 clubs entered the competition. It began on 24 January 1937 with the quarterfinals and concluded on 28 February 1937 with the final which was held at GSP Stadium. APOEL won their 1st Cypriot Cup trophy after beating Enosis Neon Trust 2–1 in the final.

== Format ==
In the 1936–37 Cypriot Cup, participated all the teams of the Cypriot First Division.

The competition consisted of three knock-out rounds. In all rounds each tie was played as a single leg and was held at the home ground of one of the two teams, according to the draw results. Each tie winner was qualifying to the next round. If a match was drawn, extra time was following. If extra time was drawn, there was a replay match.

== Quarter-finals ==
Team 1	Result	Team 2
(A) APOEL	6 - 2	Anorthosis (A)
(A) Olympiakos	3 - 2	Aris (A)
(A) AEL	1 - 4	Enosis Neon Trust (A)
(A) Lefkoşa Türk Spor Kulübü	Bye

== Semi-finals ==
Team 1	Result	Team 2
(A) APOEL	3 - 1	Lefkoşa Türk Spor Kulübü (A)
(A) Enosis Neon Trust	4 - 1	Olympiakos (A)

== Final ==
28 February 1937

APOEL	2 – 1	Enosis Neon Trust
Likourgos Archontides 47'; Giorgos Avraamides 80'		44' Fenek Vensan

GSP Stadium, Nicosia
Referee: Arthouros Skiadas

Cypriot Cup 1936–37 Winners
APOEL
1st title

== Sources ==
- "1936/37 Cyprus Cup". RSSSF. 2017-08-24.

== Bibliography ==
- Gavreilides, Michalis; Papamoiseos, Stelios (2001). Ένας αιώνας Κυπριακό ποδόσφαιρο [One century Cypriot football] (in Greek). Nicosia: The writer. p. 33. ISBN 9963-8720-1-8.
- Meletiou, Giorgos (2011). Κυπριακό ποδόσφαιρο 1900–1960 [Cypriot Football 1900–1960] (in Greek). Nicosia: Power Publishing. pp. 74, 284. ISBN 978-9963-688-87-6.

== See also ==
- Cypriot Cup
- 1936–37 Cypriot First Division
