= Cypriot Women's Volleyball League =

Cypriot National Division
- Current season, competition or edition: 2024–25 Cypriot Women's Volleyball National Division
- Sport: Volleyball
- Founded: 1975
- First season: 1975/76
- Administrator: KOΠ
- No. of teams: 8 (2019–20)
- Country: Cyprus
- Continent: Europe
- Level on pyramid: 1
- Relegation to: 2nd League
- Domestic cups: Cyprus Cup; Cyprus Super Cup
- International cups: CEV Champions League; CEV Cup; CEV Challenge Cup
- Website: http://new.volleyball.org.cy

The Cypriot Women's Volleyball National Division is the major volleyball national competition for women in Cyprus, established in 1975. It is organised by the Cyprus Volleyball Federation (Kypriaki Omospondia Petosfairisis-KOP).

== History ==
In the 2018/19 season in Division A 8 teams had participated: "Anorthosis (Famagusta/Limasol), AEL (Limasol), AEC (Larnaca), Apollo (Limasol), Olympiada (Nicosia), Paphiakos Theodorou (Paphos), TOI (Avgorou), Anagennesi (Derinha). The championship title was won by Anorthosis for the second time in a row. The 2nd place went to the AEL, the 3rd to the AEC.

== Winners list ==
Years	(gold) Gold	(silver) Silver	(bronze) Bronze
1976	AEK Larnaca	Anorthosis Famagusta	
1977	AEL Limassol	Pezoporikos Larnaca	
1978	AEL Limassol	APOEL Nicosie	
1979	AEL Limassol	APOEL Nicosie	
1980	AEL Limassol	APOEL Nicosie	
1981	AEL Limassol	Nea Salamina Famagusta	
1982	AEL Limassol	Nea Salamina Famagusta	
1983	AEL Limassol	Nea Salamina Famagusta	
1984	AEL Limassol	APOEL Nicosie	
1985	AEL Limassol	APOEL Nicosie	
1986	AEL Limassol	APOEL Nicosie	
1987	AEL Limassol	APOEL Nicosie	
1988	AEL Limassol	APOEL Nicosie	
1989	AEL Limassol	Pezoporikos Larnaca	
1990	AEL Limassol	Olympiada Neapolis	
1991	AEL Limassol	Olympiada Neapolis	
1992	Olympiada Neapolis	AEL Limassol	
1993	AEL Limassol	Anorthosis Famagusta	
1994	AEL Limassol	Anorthosis Famagusta	
1995	AEL Limassol	Anorthosis Famagusta	
1996	AEL Limassol	Anorthosis Famagusta	
1997	AEL Limassol	Anorthosis Famagusta	
1998	AEL Limassol	Anorthosis Famagusta	
1999	AEL Limassol	Apollon Limassol	
2000	AEL Limassol	Anorthosis Famagusta	
2001	AEL Limassol	Apollon Limassol	
2002	Anorthosis Famagusta	AEL Limassol	
2003	AEL Limassol	Apollon Limassol	
2004	Anorthosis Famagusta	AEL Limassol	
2005	AEL Limassol	Anorthosis Famagusta	
2006	Anorthosis Famagusta	AEL Limassol	
2007	AEK Larnaca	AEL Limassol	Anorthosis Famagusta
2008	AEL Limassol	Anorthosis Famagusta	AEK Larnaca
2009	AEL Limassol	Anorthosis Famagusta	Apollon Limassol
2010	Anorthosis Famagusta	AEL Limassol	Apollon Limassol
2011	Apollon Limassol	Anorthosis Famagusta	AEL Limassol
2012	AEL Limassol	Apollon Limassol	Anorthosis Famagusta
2013	Anorthosis Famagusta	Apollon Limassol	AEL Limassol
2014	Apollon Limassol	Anorthosis Famagusta	AEL Limassol
2015	Apollon Limassol	AEK Larnaca	Anorthosis Famagusta
2016	Apollon Limassol	AEK Larnaca	Anorthosis Famagusta
2017	Apollon Limassol	AEL Limassol	AEK Larnaca
2018	Anorthosis Famagusta	AEK Larnaca	Apollon Limassol
2019	Anorthosis Famagusta	AEL Limassol	AEK Larnaca
2021	AEL Limassol	Apollon Limassol	Olympiada Neapolis

== Table by Club ==
rk.	Club	Titles	City	Years Won
1	AEL Limassol	30	Limassol	(1977–1991) (1993–2001), 2003, 2005, (2008–2009), 2012, 2021
2	Anorthosis Famagusta	7	Famagusta	2002, 2004, 2006, 2010, 2013, (2018–2019)
3	Apollon Limassol	6	Limassol	2011, (2014–2017), 2022
4	Olympiada Neapolis	4	Nicosia	1992, (2023–2025)
5	AEK Larnaca	2	Larnaca	1976, 2007
