= 1926 (magazine) =

Cypriot sports magazine

APOEL 1926
- Categories: Sports magazine
- Frequency: Monthly
- Publisher: MEDIAPRO
- First issue: March 7, 2013
- Country: Cyprus
- Based in: Nicosia
- Language: Greek
- Website: www.apoel.com.cy

1926 is a Cypriot monthly sports magazine published in Nicosia. It is the official magazine of the multi-sports club APOEL and was established in 2013.

== History ==
The magazine was established in 2013 and published by MEDIAPRO as the APOEL's official magazine, providing a monthly insight about the Cypriot multisport club APOEL Nicosia. The magazine is named after the founding year of the club. The first issue appeared in March 2013 and was available throughout the island in media outlets, the Orange Shop (APOEL's official store), and online at readpoint.com.

== Content ==
The magazine covers all of APOEL's teams (football, basketball, futsal, volleyball, water polo), as well as individual sports (archery, bowling, cycling, running, swimming, table tennis), with feature stories, interviews, retro, and presentations. The main focus is on football, since that sport is the most popular in Cyprus.

== See also ==
- APOEL FC
