= 1935–36 Cypriot Cup =

Tournament details
- Country: Cyprus
- Dates: 13 October 1935 – 3 November 1935
- Teams: 8

Final positions
- Champions: Enosis Neon Trust (2nd title)
- Runners-up: Lefkoşa Türk Spor Kulübü

The 1935–36 Cypriot Cup was the second edition of the Cypriot Cup. A total of 8 clubs entered the competition. It began on 13 October 1935 with the quarterfinals and concluded on 3 November 1935 with the final which was held at GSP Stadium. Enosis Neon Trust won their 2nd Cypriot Cup trophy after beating Lefkoşa Türk Spor Kulübü 1–0 in the final.

== Format ==
In the 1935–36 Cypriot Cup, participated all the teams of the Cypriot First Division.

The competition consisted of three knock-out rounds. In all rounds each tie was played as a single leg and was held at the home ground of one of the two teams, according to the draw results. Each tie winner was qualifying to the next round. If a match was drawn, extra time was following. If extra time was drawn, there was a replay match.

== Quarter-finals ==
Team 1	Result	Team 2
(A) Anorthosis Famagusta FC	2 - 3	APOEL FC (A)
(A) EPA Larnaca FC	7 - 3	Olympiakos Nicosia (A)
(A) Aris Limassol FC	2 - 4	Enosis Neon Trust (A)
(A) Lefkoşa Türk Spor Kulübü	1 - 1, 1 - 0	AEL Limassol (A)

== Semi-finals ==
Team 1	Result	Team 2
(A) Enosis Neon Trust	4 - 1	APOEL FC (A)
(A) EPA Larnaca FC	0 - 4	Lefkoşa Türk Spor Kulübü (A)

== Final ==
3 November 1935

Enosis Neon Trust	4 – 1	Lefkoşa Türk Spor Kulübü
Aram Tsatirtsian 25'; Louter Salakian 74'; Aram Tsatirtsian 80'; Takis Tsiges 84'		19' Derviş Latif

GSP Stadium, Nicosia
Referee: Arthouros Skiadas

Cypriot Cup 1935–36 Winners
Enosis Neon Trust
2nd title

== Sources ==
- "1935/36 Cyprus Cup". RSSSF. 2017-08-24.

== Bibliography ==
- Gavreilides, Michalis; Papamoiseos, Stelios (2001). Ένας αιώνας Κυπριακό ποδόσφαιρο [One century Cypriot football] (in Greek). Nicosia: The writer. p. 31. ISBN 9963-8720-1-8.
- Meletiou, Giorgos (2011). Κυπριακό ποδόσφαιρο 1900–1960 [Cypriot Football 1900–1960] (in Greek). Nicosia: Power Publishing. p. 284. ISBN 978-9963-688-87-6.

== See also ==
- Cypriot Cup
- 1935–36 Cypriot First Division
