= List of Anorthosis Famagusta F.C. managers =

Anorthosis Famagusta F.C. is one of the most successful football clubs in Cyprus. The club was established in 1911, but the football department was only formed in 1929. They joined the Cyprus Football Association in 1934 as a founding member, but due to financial difficulties they ceased operation of the football team in 1937. The football team was reformed in 1945 and has been in existence since then. The list of managers is currently incomplete.

== Managers ==
As of 18 Jan 2023

Coach	Period		Titles	Domestic		
Coach	from	until	Titles	A'	KK	SC
(Greece) Mimis Pierrakos	1933	1937	–	–	–	–
(Cyprus) Antonis Papadopoulos	1954	1955	–	–	–	–
(Greece) Giannis Vazos	1959	1960	–	–	–	–
(Cyprus) Pambos Avramidis	1960	1960	–	–	–	–
(Greece) Giannis Vazos	1960	1961	–	–	–	–
(Hungary) Sándor Reiner	July 1961	October 1963	–	–	–	–
(Austria) Lukas Aurednik	November 1963	June 1965	1	–	1	–
(Hungary) Gyula Zsengellér	July 1968	December 1969	–	–	–	–
(Socialist Federal Republic of Yugoslavia) Sima Milovanov	1970	1970	–	–	–	–
(Cyprus) Panikos Iakovou	July 1970	June 1971	1	–	1	–
(Czechoslovakia) Vladimir Hobot	1972	1973	–	–	–	–
(Greece) Stefanos Petritsis	1973	1974	–	–	–	–
(Cyprus) Antonis Karras	July 1974	June 1977	1	–	1	–
(Socialist Federal Republic of Yugoslavia) Andon Dončevski	July 1981	June 1982	–	–	–	–
(Bulgaria) Tsvetan Ilchev	July 1982	June 1984	–	–	–	–
(Scotland) Peter Cormack	July 1984	June 1986	–	–	–	–
(Greece) Lakis Petropoulos	November 1987	June 1989	–	–	–	–
(Socialist Federal Republic of Yugoslavia) Mirsad Fazlagić	1989	1990	–	–	–	–
(Romania) Anghel Iordănescu	July 1990	June 1992	–	–	–	–
(Georgia (country)) Vladimir Gutsaev	1992	1992	–	–	–	–
(Greece) Nikos Alefantos	January 1993	June 1993	–	–	–	–
(Cyprus) Andreas Mouskallis	1993	1994	–	–	–	–
(Bulgaria) Yordan Yordanov	July 1994	June 1995	1	1	–	–
(Bulgaria) Georgi Vasilev	July 1995	December 1995	1	–	–	1
(Greece) Nikos Karoulias	1996	June 1996	–	–	–	–
(Federal Republic of Yugoslavia) Dušan Mitošević	July 1996	June 2001	8	4	1	3
(Poland) Janusz Wójcik	July 2001	November 2001	–	–	–	–
(Greece) Giannis Mantzourakis	December 2001	January 2002	–	–	–	–
(Bulgaria) Nikolay Kostov	January 2002	June 2002	1	–	1	–
(Poland) Edward Lorens	August 2002	December 2002	–	–	–	–
(Cyprus) Andreas Michaelides	February 2003	August 2003	1	–	1	–
(Georgia (country)) Temur Ketsbaia	July 2004	April 2009	4	2	1	1
(Germany) Ernst Middendorp	May 2009	July 2009	–	–	–	–
(Serbia) Slavoljub Muslin	August 2009	February 2010	–	–	–	–
(Cyprus) Nikos Nicolaou	February 2010	June 2010	–	–	–	–
(Argentina) Ángel Guillermo Hoyos	July 2010	November 2010	–	–	–	–
(Serbia) Slobodan Krčmarević	November 2010	December 2010	–	–	–	–
(Bulgaria) Stanimir Stoilov	December 2010	September 2011	–	–	–	–
(Israel) Ronny Levy	October 2011	April 2013	–	–	–	–
(Cyprus) Pambos Christodoulou	April 2013	May 2013	–	–	–	–
(Cyprus) Christakis Kassianos	June 2013	August 2013	–	–	–	–
(Portugal) Jorge Costa	August 2013	February 2014	–	–	–	–
(Greece) Nikos Kostenoglou	February 2014	May 2014	–	–	–	–
(Netherlands) André Paus	June 2014	February 2016	–	–	–	–
(Serbia) Zoran Milinković	February 2016	March 2016	–	–	–	–
(Cyprus) Neophytos Larkou	March 2016	May 2016	–	–	–	–
(Spain) Antonio Puche	June 2016	October 2016	–	–	–	–
(Israel) Ronny Levy	October 2016	September 2018	–	–	–	–
(Netherlands) Jurgen Streppel	October 2018	May 2019	–	–	–	–
(Georgia (country)) Temur Ketsbaia	June 2019	June 2022	1	–	1	–
(Slovenia) Darko Milanič	June 2022	October 2022	–	–	–	–
(Spain) Xisco Munoz	October 2022	January 2023	–	–	–	–
(Serbia) Vesko Mihajlović	January 2023	May 2023	–	–	–	–
(Spain) David Gallego	June 2023	Present	–	–	–	–
