= Themistokleio Sports Center =

Sports arena in Limassol, Cyprus

- Interactive map of Themistokleio Sports Center
- Location: Limassol
- Capacity: 3,500

Tenant
- Anorthosis VC

Themistokleio Sports Center is an indoor arena in Limassol, Cyprus. It is the home venue of Anorthosis VC.

It was used as additional capacity for a nearby hospital during the COVID-19 pandemic. The arena has hosted political protests.
