= 1937–38 Cypriot Cup =

Tournament details
- Country: Cyprus
- Dates: 13 February 1938 – 27 March 1938
- Teams: 5

Final positions
- Champions: Enosis Neon Trust (3rd title)
- Runners-up: AEL

The 1937–38 Cypriot Cup was the fourth edition of the Cypriot Cup. A total of 5 clubs entered the competition. It began on 13 February 1938 with the quarterfinals and concluded on 27 March 1938 with the final which was held at GSP Stadium. Enosis Neon Trust won their 3rd Cypriot Cup trophy after beating AEL 2–1 in the final.

== Format ==
In the 1937–38 Cypriot Cup, participated all the teams of the Cypriot First Division.

The competition consisted of three knock-out rounds. In all rounds each tie was played as a single leg and was held at the home ground of one of the two teams, according to the draw results. Each tie winner was qualifying to the next round. If a match was drawn, extra time was following. If extra time was drawn, there was a replay match.

== Quarter-finals ==
Team 1	Result	Team 2
(A) APOEL	1 - 0	Lefkoşa Türk Spor Kulübü (A)
(A) AEL	Bye
(A) Aris	Bye
(A) Enosis Neon Trust	Bye

== Semi-finals ==
Team 1	Result	Team 2
(A) AEL	7 - 0	Aris (A)
(A) Enosis Neon Trust	3 - 0	APOEL (A)

== Final ==
27 March 1938

Enosis Neon Trust	2 – 1	AEL

GSP Stadium, Nicosia

Cypriot Cup 1937–38 Winners
Enosis Neon Trust
3rd title

== Sources ==
- "1937/38 Cyprus Cup". RSSSF. 2017-08-24.

== Bibliography ==
- Gavreilides, Michalis; Papamoiseos, Stelios (2001). Ένας αιώνας Κυπριακό ποδόσφαιρο [One century Cypriot football] (in Greek). Nicosia: The writer. p. 35. ISBN 9963-8720-1-8.
- Meletiou, Giorgos (2011). Κυπριακό ποδόσφαιρο 1900–1960 [Cypriot Football 1900–1960] (in Greek). Nicosia: Power Publishing. pp. 80, 285. ISBN 978-9963-688-87-6.

== See also ==
- Cypriot Cup
- 1937–38 Cypriot First Division
