= List of Anorthosis Famagusta presidents =

Anorthosis Famagusta is a Cypriot cultural and sports club that was established in 1911. It has had many presidents over the years, including some honorary presidents. This article has a complete list of presidents of the club.

== Anorthosis Famagusta association presidents ==
As of 14 June 2022

This is a complete list of all presidents of the Anorthosis Famagusta sports club.

President	Period	
President	from	until
Nicolaos Katalanos	1911	1911
Michail Michailidis	1911	1914
Ioannis Myrianthous	1914	1917
Michail Michailidis	1917	1919
Louis Loizou	1919	1920
Morfis Michail	1920	1924
Anastasios Oikonomidis	1924	1940
Andreas Gavriilidis	1940	1955
Anastasios Oikonomidis	1955	1961
Pavlos Pavlakis	1961	1962
Michail Kiagias	1962	1963
Nicolaos Antoniou	1963	1966
Pavlos Pavlakis	1966	1967
Xanthos Sarris	1967	1969
Dinos Adam	1969	1970
Takis Pelekanos	1970	1983
Stelios Frenaritis	1983	1989
Kikis Konstantinou	1989	2003
Kyriakos Theocharous	2003	2004
Andreas Panteli	2004	2008
Chris Georgiades	2009	2009
Antonis Dimitriou	2009	2010
Kyriakos Kousios	2010	2011
Kikis Konstantinou	2011	2011
Savvas Kakos	2011	2013
Achilleas Nicolaou	2013	2013
Christos Poullaidis	2013	2016
Charalambos Manoli	2016	2017
Loizos Loizou	2017	2019
Michalis Hadjipantelas	2019	2019
Christos Chatzistefanou	2019	2022
Evgenios Chamboullas	2022	present

== Anorthosis Famagusta (Football) Public LTD presidents ==
As of 18 Jan 2023

In 2014, Christos Poullaidis rescued Anorthosis financially and created a public company for the footballing department of the club, Anorthosis Famagusta (Football) Public LTD, of which there is a president. This is a different position to the association president, the role is to control only the football club and not the other activities of Anorthosis. Here is a complete list of them.

President	Period	
President	from	until
Charalambos Manolis	2014	2016
Christos Poullaidis	2016	2017
Andreas Panteli	2017	2019
Michalis Hadjipantelas	2019	2019
Evgenios Chamboullas	2019	2022
Christos Poullaidis	2022	2023
Andreas Santis	2023	present
