= AEK Karava-Lampousa =

AEK Karava
- Founded: 1957
- Ground: Spyros Kyprianou Athletic Center; Limassol, Cyprus
- Capacity: 6255
- League: Cyprus Volleyball Division 1
- 2016–17: 7th

AEK Karava-Lampousa (Greek: ΑΕΚ Καραβά-Λάμπουσα) is a professional volleyball team based in Karavas, Cyprus. The club has been a refugee club since the 1974 Turkish invasion of Cyprus, when Turkey occupied the northern part of the island. The club is temporarily based in Limassol.

== Football ==
Before 1974 it had a football team. After 1974 the football team merged with PAEK to form PAEEK.

== Honours ==
- Cypriot Championships
  - Winner (1): 2011/12
- Cyprus Cup:
  - Winner (3): 2009/10, 2012/13, 2014/15
- Cyprus Super Cup:
  - Winner (2): 2010, 2012
