= 1934–35 Cypriot Cup =

Tournament details
- Country: Cyprus
- Dates: 4 November 1934 – 25 November 1934
- Teams: 8

Final positions
- Champions: Enosis Neon Trust (1st title)
- Runners-up: APOEL

The 1934–35 Cypriot Cup was the first edition of the Cypriot Cup. A total of 8 clubs entered the competition. It began on 4 November 1934 with the quarterfinals and concluded on 25 November 1934 with the replay final which was held at GSP Stadium. Enosis Neon Trust won their 1st Cypriot Cup trophy after beating APOEL 1–0 in the final.

== Format ==
In the 1934–35 Cypriot Cup, participated all the teams of the Cypriot First Division.

The competition consisted of three knock-out rounds. In all rounds each tie was played as a single leg and was held at the home ground of one of the two teams, according to the draw results. Each tie winner was qualifying to the next round. If a match was drawn, extra time was following. If extra time was drawn, there was a replay match.

== Quarter-finals ==
All games took place on 4 November 1934.

Team 1	Result	Team 2	Stadium
(A) EPA Larnaca	0 - 1	APOEL (A)	GSZ
(A) AEL	2 - 3	Lefkoşa Türk Spor Kulübü (A)	GSO
(A) Enosis Neon Trust	5 - 2	Aris Limassol (A)	GSP
(A) Anorthosis Famagusta	7 - 2	Olympiakos Nicosia (A)	GSE

== Semi-finals ==
All games took place on 11 November 1934.

Team 1	Result	Team 2	Stadium
(A) APOEL	1 - 0	Lefkoşa Türk Spor Kulübü (A)	GSP
(A) Anorthosis Famagusta	2 - 3	Enosis Neon Trust (A)	GSE

== Final ==
18 November 1934

Enosis Neon Trust	0–0 (a.e.t.)	APOEL FC

GSP Stadium, Nicosia

Because the match ended in a draw after the extra time, a replay match was played.

25 November 1934
09:45 EET

Enosis Neon Trust	1–0	APOEL FC
Tsigis 55'

GSP Stadium, Nicosia

Cypriot Cup 1934–35 Winners
Enosis Neon Trust
1st title

== Sources ==
- "1934/35 Cyprus Cup". RSSSF. 2017-08-24.

== Bibliography ==
- Gavreilides, Michalis; Papamoiseos, Stelios (2001). Ένας αιώνας Κυπριακό ποδόσφαιρο [One century Cypriot football] (in Greek). Nicosia: The writer. p. 29. ISBN 9963-8720-1-8.
- Meletiou, Giorgos (2011). Κυπριακό ποδόσφαιρο 1900–1960 [Cypriot Football 1900–1960] (in Greek). Nicosia: Power Publishing. p. 284. ISBN 978-9963-688-87-6.
- Stephanides, Giorgos (2015). Μεγάλες Στιγμές Κυπριακού Ποδοσφαίρου 1934-2014 [Big moments of Cypriot Football 1934-2014]. Cyprus: Giorgos Stephanides. pp. 31–34. ISBN 978-9963-8841-3-1.

== See also ==
- Cypriot Cup
- 1934–35 Cypriot First Division
