= 1934–35 Cypriot First Division =

Cypriot First Division
- Season: 1934–35
- Champions: Enosis Neon Trust (1st title)
- Matches: 53
- Goals: 223 (4.21 per match)
- Top goalscorer: Takis Tsiges (13 goals)

The 1934–35 Cypriot First Division was the 1st season of the Cypriot top-level football league. Enosis Neon Trust won their 1st title.

== Format ==
Eight teams participated in the 1934–35 Cypriot First Division. All teams played against each other twice, once at their home and once away. The team with the most points at the end of the season crowned champions.

=== Point system ===
Teams received two points for a win, one point for a draw and zero points for a loss.

== Stadiums and locations ==
The table below shows the stadiums of each team.

1934–35 Cypriot First Division.

Team	Stadium
AEL Limassol	GSO
Anorthosis Famagusta FC	GSE
APOEL FC	GSP
Aris Limassol FC	GSO
Enosis Neon Trust	GSP
EPA Larnaca FC	GSZ
Olympiakos Nicosia	GSP
Lefkoşa Türk Spor Kulübü	GSP

== League standings ==
Pos	Team	Pld	W	D	L	GF	GA	GD	Pts
1	Enosis Neon Trust (C)	14	11	2	1	45	15	+30	24
2	Lefkoşa Türk Spor Kulübü	13	6	4	3	31	12	+19	16
3	APOEL FC	14	7	1	6	25	20	+5	15
4	AEL Limassol	14	6	2	6	37	26	+11	14
5	Anorthosis Famagusta FC	14	4	5	5	27	38	−11	13
6	Aris Limassol FC	13	4	2	7	30	30	0	10
7	EPA Larnaca FC	12	5	0	7	17	34	−17	10
8	Olympiakos Nicosia	12	1	2	9	11	48	−37	4

Rules for classification: Points
(C) Champions

== Results ==
Home \ Away	AEL	ANR	APL	ARS	EPA	OLM	TRS	LTS
AEL		1–1	2–4	7–2	0–1	5–1	0–6	0–0
Anorthosis	5–4		3–2	4–4	6–1	1–1	0–2	1–1
APOEL	0–4	4–1		0–1	4–1	3–0	1–2	0–3
Aris	1–2	8–1	1–2		2–0	3–0	2–2	1–4
EPA	0–4	3–0	1–0	5–4		2–3	2–4	1–0
Olympiakos	0–8	2–3	0–3	– (Note: The matches Lefkoşa Türk Spor Kulübü-EPA Larnaca, Olympiakos Nicosia-EPA Larnaca, Olympiakos Nicosia-Aris Limassol were canceled. Cyprus Football Association decided not to have the remaining matches because the champion was judged.)	–		0–3	3–3
Trust	1–0	4–0	0–0	1–0	7–0	11–1		1–0
LTSK	4–0	1–1	1–2	2–1	–	3–0	9–1	

Legend: Blue = home team win; Yellow = draw; Red = away team win.

== See also ==
- Cypriot First Division
- 1934–35 Cypriot Cup
- Cypriot First Division top goalscorers

== Sources ==
- Στεφανίδης, Γιώργος (2014-12-14). "Το πρώτο παγκύπριο πρωτάθλημα" [The first Cypriot championship] (PDF). Haravgi (in Greek). p. 23. Archived from the original (PDF) on 2015-08-05.
- "Cyprus 1934/35". RSSSF. 2017-08-24.
- Κυριάκου, Άκη (2016-01-31). "Το πρώτο επίσημο πρωτάθλημα του 1934" (in Greek). Simerini. Archived from the original on 2016-03-13.

== Bibliography ==
- Gavreilides, Michalis; Papamoiseos, Stelios (2001). Ένας αιώνας Κυπριακό ποδόσφαιρο [One century Cypriot football] (in Greek). Nicosia: The writer. p. 29. ISBN 9963-8720-1-8.
- Meletiou, Giorgos (2011). Κυπριακό ποδόσφαιρο 1900–1960 [Cypriot Football 1900–1960] (in Greek). Nicosia: Power Publishing. ISBN 978-9963-688-87-6.
- Stephanidis, Giorgos (2015). Μεγάλες Στιγμές Κυπριακού Ποδοσφαίρου 1934-2014 [Important moments of Cypriot Football 1934-2014] (in Greek). Cyprus. pp. 41–46. ISBN 978-9963-8841-3-1.
