= Cyprus Volleyball Federation =

Governing body of volleyball in Cyprus

Cyprus Volleyball Federation Kυπριακή Oμοσπονδία Πετοσφαίρισης Kıbrıs Voleybol Federasyonu
- Founded: 1978
- Headquarters: Nicosia
- Location: Cyprus
- President: Dr. Michalis Krashias
- Secretary: Yiannos Prokopiou

Official website
- www.volleyball.org.cy

Cyprus Volleyball Federation (CVF) (Greek: Kυπριακή Oμοσπονδία Πετοσφαίρισης, Κ.Ο.ΠΕ) (Turkish: Kıbrıs Voleybol Federasyonu (KVF)) is the governing body of volleyball in Cyprus. It organises the first division, second division leagues and a cup competition.

== Before the Federation's establishment ==
Volleyball first made its appearance in Cyprus in 1920 and was first included as a competitive event in the 1928 Pancyprian Games. After the World War II it was played a lot at schools and a Student Championship was established. The Local Committee of SEGAS Cyprus (SEGAS is the sports governing body of Greece) was founded in 1947 and established annual championships between the Gymnastic Clubs and then between those clubs that had a volleyball section. A representative team of Cyprus was invited in 1953 in Egypt to play against Greek and Egyptian teams of Cairo and Alexandria.

On November 23, 1966, the Local Committee of Cypriot Athletes was established by 15 sport clubs as a local federation of the Greek one. In 1971, the first championship took place and APOEL became the Champions. As Winners of a championship which was run by a local committee, APOEL were represented in the Greek National First Division in 1972/73 and in 1973/74 the Cypriot Champions Anorthosis Famagusta. However, Cypriot teams stop taking place in the Greek Championship after the Turkish invasion of Cyprus in 1974.

== The establishment and afterwards ==
The sport, which was originally governed by the Greek Sports federation until 1978, became a separate entity, when the Cyprus Volleyball Federation (CVF) was established. The following clubs were the founding members of the CVF:

AEL Limassol, Anagennisis Deryneia, Anorthosis, APOEL, Apollon Limassol, APOP Paphos, Aris Polemi, Achaeon Akti Gialoussas, Achilleas Kaimakli, E.N.P. Paralimni, Marathon Kato Varosha, Nea Salamis Famagusta, Olympiakos Nicosia, Olympias Neapolis, Olympias Frenaros, Omonia Nicosia, Omonoia Xylotympou, Pezoporikos Larnaca, Phoenix Pyla, EPA Larnaca.

The CVF is a member of Fédération Internationale de Volleyball (FIVB) and of Confédération Européenne de Volleyball (CEV) and is responsible for representing Cyprus on the international Volleyball stage. Its headquarters are in Nicosia.

Currently the C.V.F. has 25 active clubs, fielding 23 teams in the men's and women's senior competitions, plus as many as 60 teams in junior and youth events. The CVF currently runs the First and Second Division Championships and Cups for both men and women and several junior competitions. The honored teams of First Division Championships and Cups represent Cyprus in European competitions. Also the Federation is responsible for all the national teams in men and women.

== Beach Volleyball in Cyprus ==
The Beach Volley has occurred in Cyprus for the first time on the beaches of Famagusta where you gather the best volleyballers of the island mainly from Famagusta and Nicosia. Tournaments were held daily between athletes and the sport became very popular but was not through the Federation.

The Federation with the foundation in 1978 made several studies and tournaments started being organized by the Federation regional tournament on men and women (5X5, 3X3, 2X2 and 4X4 mixed) and then island-wide since 1987. Slowly began to be upgraded over the years with the last few years have not been anything to envy from other volleyball leagues developed countries.

In 1993 on the initiative of former international volleyballer Anorthosis Christos Angelides, the company H & C Hotels Ltd and the Federation hosted the first unofficial international tournament ever held in Cyprus in the name of Protaras Open in 1996 and renamed Odessa International.

In 1996 CY.V.F. upgraded the championship tournament over Cyprus and the institution was established. The 2000 championship was given to the company "Events One" for five (5) years and since 2006 the Federation reorganizes the tournaments in new and better bases.

The Beach Volley tournament involving the best Cypriot Volleyballers surrogate partners, members of the Nat. Volleyball Teams and more, so the interest is increased and the fan turnout is any time beyond the most optimistic expectations. In 2005 Cypriot athletes participated for the first time in tournament games Small States of Europe. Due to the increased interest Beach Volley receive high visibility from the media and broadcast live the final phase.

The games are played on weekends from morning until night during July and August to beach volleyball courts that now exist in all towns of Cyprus. During this period there are four (4) beach volleyball tournaments held for men and two (2) for women.

The growth of Cyprus beach volleyball can be shown by organising the Cyprus FIVB Challenger 2006 made the Tourist Beach Geroskipou and crowned with complete success. 67 teams participated from 22 countries with prize money of $ 60 000. Paramount importance for the spread of the sport, but also the promotion of Cyprus was the third edition of the World University Championship held at the City Sports Facilities of Paralimni.

Every year in Yeroskipou a major event held by CEV or FIVB has been made. Meanwhile the women's national team of Cyprus has made a lot of successful showings (gold medal in GSSE, silver medal in the European u21 tournament, 7th place in Mediterranean Games, etc.) while the men's team accepted the gold medal in GSSE, the bronze medal in the CEV Satellite challenger in Yeroskipou in 2010, and the 7th position in the Mediterranean Games. Three consecutive times the Cypriot women Manolina Constantinou and Mariotta Angelopoulou have won the Greek series, which shows that the Cypriot team is one of the best in Panhellenic.

From the above, the perceived high activity of the Cyprus Volleyball Federation and the efforts for further progress in our sport. The fact that every year the Cev Challenger is being held in Cyprus with more than 2.000 spectators watching the games shows how high beach volleyball is ranked among Cypriots. It has also been mentioned that in 2015 the CVF is making efforts to organise the World Tour in Paphos.
