= Nea Salamis Famagusta VC =

Cypriot volleyball club

- Full name: Nea Salamis Famagusta Volleyball Club
- Nickname: Vasilissa
- Founded: 1976
- Ground: Spyros Kyprianou Athletic Center; Limassol, Cyprus (Capacity: 6255)
- Chairman: (Cyprus) Simos Ioannou
- Head Coach: (Cyprus) Kyriakos Adamou
- League: Cyprus Volleyball Division 1
- 2016–17: 3d place
- Website: Club home page

Uniforms
Home	Away

Nea Salamis Famagusta VC or Nea Salamina Famagusta VC (Greek: Νέα Σαλαμίς Αμμοχώστου) is a professional volleyball team based in Ammochostos (also known by its romanized name, Famagusta), Cyprus. It has been a refugee club since the 1974 Turkish invasion of Cyprus, when Turkey occupied the northern part of the island. The club is temporarily based in Limassol. The team is part of the Nea Salamina Famagusta sports club, which was founded in 1948; the parent club also fields a men's football team which temporarily based in Larnaka.

Nea Salamina Famagusta VC is one of the most powerful teams in Cyprus. With 9 championships, 8 cups and 8 Super Cups it is the second team in trophies after Anorthosis Famagusta FC. The ground of the team is in Limassol, the indoor athletic arena Spyros Kyprianou Athletic Center.

== History ==
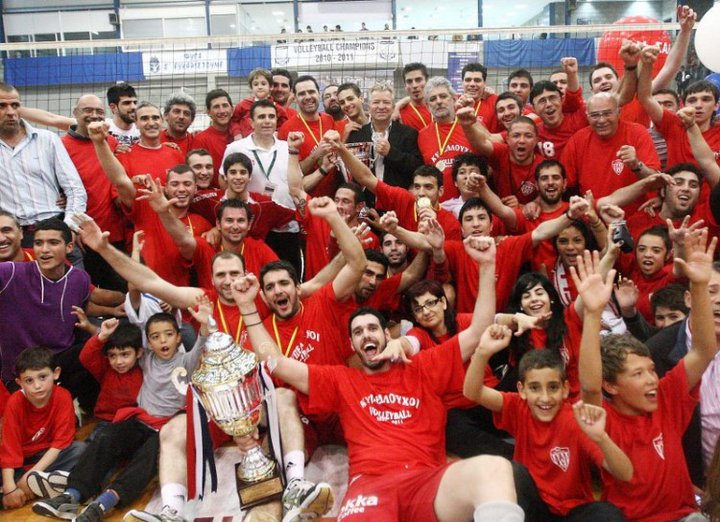
Awarding the trophy for the volleyball Cypriot cup 2010–2011 to Nea Salamina Famagusta at Apollon Stadium.

Nea Salamina cultivated the sport of volleyball from its foundation. Since 1954, Nea Salamina organized every summer amateur leagues and cups, which attracted large crowds. In the tournament Took part teams from the province (Nea Salamina, Anorthosis Famagusta FC, the Anagennisi Dherynia, Marathon Kato Varosha, ENAD Agios Memnon).

After the invasion and refugees in 1974, Nikis Georgiou in 1975 proposed the creation of volleyball team in Limassol, in order to maintain the entity of the club. In Limassol there existed since 1974, much of the fans of Nea Salamina. The volleyball team created in 1976. It is one of the 20 founding clubs of the Cyprus Volleyball Federation in 1978. In their first inning in Cyprus Volleyball Division 1 finished in second place. The same position occupied in 1981 and 1983. In 1981 lost the championship to the difference set. In 1983 won the first cup final in winning Anorthosis 3–1. It was the first final the volleyball team participated and the first trophy in club-level men. During 1989–90 won the first championship in its history. At the same time won the cup for the second time. This was followed by another championship the next season and one cup the season after. Since 1998 and until 2003 they achieved something amazing since the dominated of Cypriot volleyball by winning 6 consecutive Championships which is a record for the competition's history. The last four championships were four consecutive treble by winning the championship, the cup and the supercup. Coach of the 6 consecutive Championships was Antonis Constantinou. As a result of this success the team is also nicknamed as the Queen of volleyball in Cyprus.

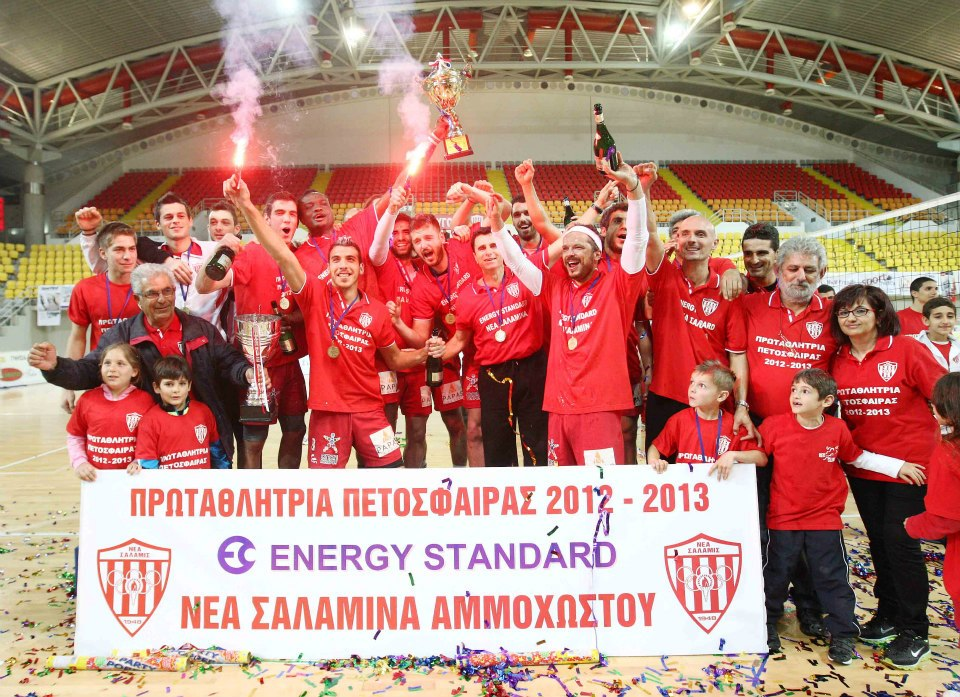
Awarding the trophy for the volleyball Cypriot championship 2012-2013 Nea Salamina Famagusta VC at Spyros Kyprianou Athletic Center.

Overall, the volleyball team won 9 championships, 8 cups and 8 shields. Took the second place 6 times and was finalist of the cup 6 times.

The home stadium of Nea Salamina in the volleyball is Spyros Kyprianou Athletic Center in Limassol.

The team has many European participants. Greater success is the qualifying in the round of 16 in Challenge Cup, winning in the Cypriot civil, Anorthosis, with two victories, over the period 2011–12. It is considered as the greatest success of Cypriot teams in Europe Cups (the same success has AEK Karavas the same period).

== Honours ==
Men

- Cypriot Championships
  - Winner (9): 1989/90, 1990/91, 1997/98, 1998/99, 1999/00, 2000/01, 2001/02, 2002/03, 2012/13
- Cyprus Cup:
  - Winner (8): 1982/83, 1989/90, 1991/92, 1999/00, 2000/01, 2001/02, 2002/03, 2010/11
- Cyprus Super Cup:
  - Winner (8): 1998, 1999, 2000, 2001, 2002, 2003, 2011, 2013

U19

- Championships:
  - Winner (9): 1994/95, 1998/99, 2004/05, 2005/06, 2006/07, 2007/08, 2010/11, 2011/12, 2012/13
- Cup:
  - Winner (6): 1996/97, 1998/99, 2005/06, 2006/07, 2007/08, 2009/10

U17

- Championships:
  - Winner (8): 1991/92, 2002/03, 2004/05, 2006/07, 2009/10, 2011/12, 2012/13, 2016/17

U15

- Championships:
  - Winner (7): 1991/92, 2002/03, 2005/06, 2006/07, 2011/12, 2013/14, 2016/17

== Former managers ==
- (Cyprus) Nikis Georgiou (1977–78)
- (Cyprus) Filippos Psilas (1985–86)
- (Cyprus) Kosta Georgiou (1987-88/1995-96)
- (Bulgaria) Dimitri Letsief (1989–92)
- (Cyprus) Petros Patsias (1993–94)
- (Cyprus) Antonis Konstantinou (1997-05/2011-12)

== Former players ==
- (Cyprus) Georgiou Kostas (Kotsios)
- (Cyprus) Kalafatis Michalis
- (Cyprus) Karantonis Pasxalis
- (Cyprus) Konstantinou Antonis
- (Cyprus) Charalampous Panagiotis (Panaos)
- (Cyprus) Adamou Lefteris
- (Cyprus) Charalampous Lampis
- (Cyprus) Chartosias Aimilios
- (Cyprus) Siapanis Giannis
- (Cyprus) Christou Nikolakis
- (Cyprus) Aristidou Akis
- (Cyprus) Adamou Kyriakos
- (Cyprus) Chartosias Aimilios

== Women's volleyball ==
In 1978 it decided to create women's volleyball team in Limassol, with a view "first, girls to deal with volleyball and second to maintain the entity of the club", which was threatened after the displacement and dispersion of the fans of the team. The first coach was Nikis Georgiou.

In the period 1984–85, the Board decided to suspend the activities of the women's team for financial reasons. In their last period was a finalist of the cup. Overall, the presence of 7 years, the women's team was finished second three times (1980/81, 1981/82, 1982/83) and three times was Cup finalist (1979/1980, 1982/83, 1984/85). Indeed, the period 1981–82 had runners on first place with the AEL, but lacked in the proportion of sets in just two sets.

== Leagues infrastructure ==
Nea Salamina also maintains sections U19, U17 and U15. The group of U19 has won 9 championships (most championships in the league), the U17 7 championships (most championships in the league) and U15 6 championships (most championships in the league). The U19 has also won 6 cups (most cup winner).

== Gallery ==
Nea Salamina VC fans
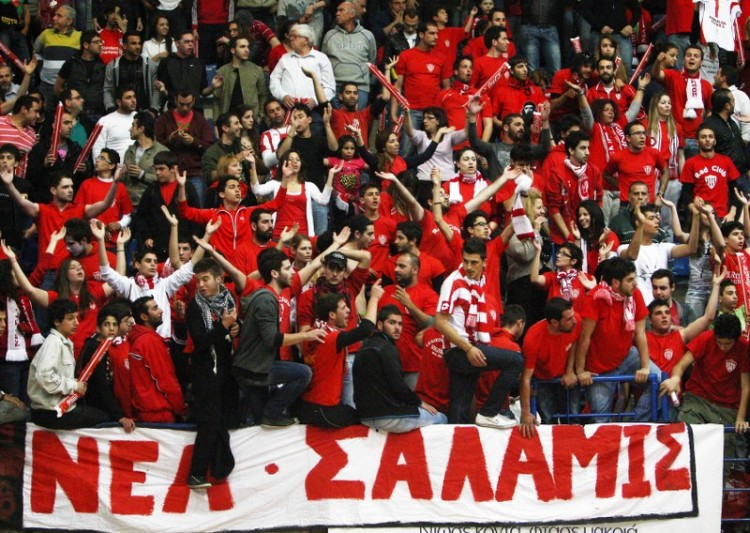
Nea Salamina Famagusta VC Fans at the final of Cyprus Volleyball Cup 2010-11, where their team won the cup.

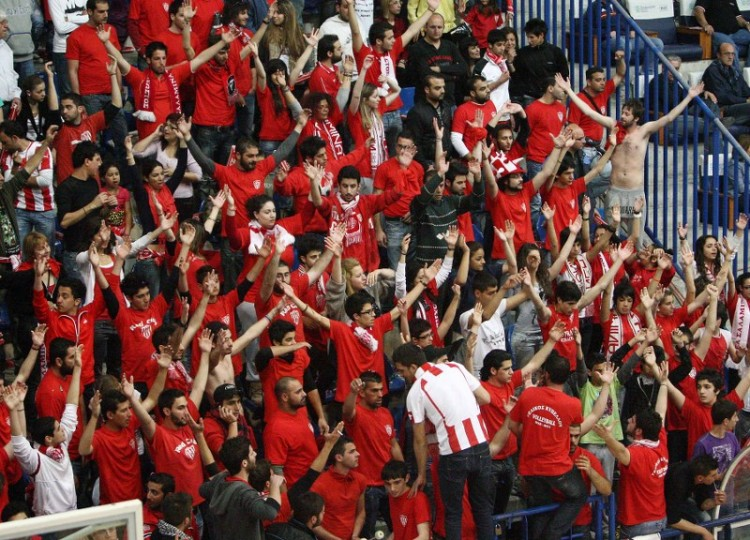
Nea Salamina Famagusta VC Fans at the final of Cyprus Volleyball Cup 2010-11, where their team won the cup.

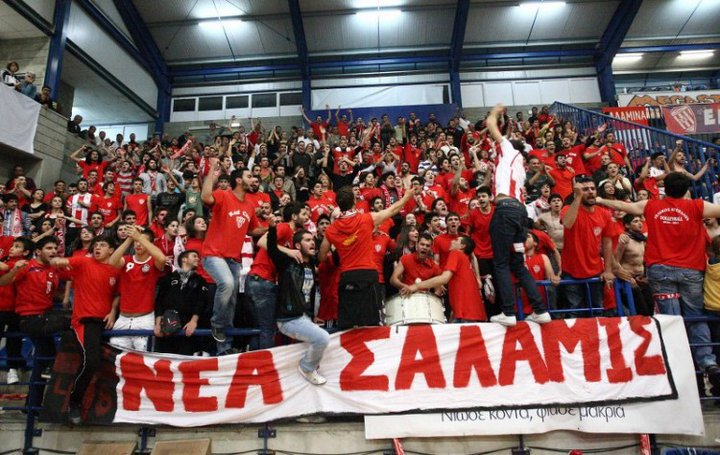
Nea Salamina Famagusta VC Fans at the final of Cyprus Volleyball Cup 2010-11, where their team won the cup.

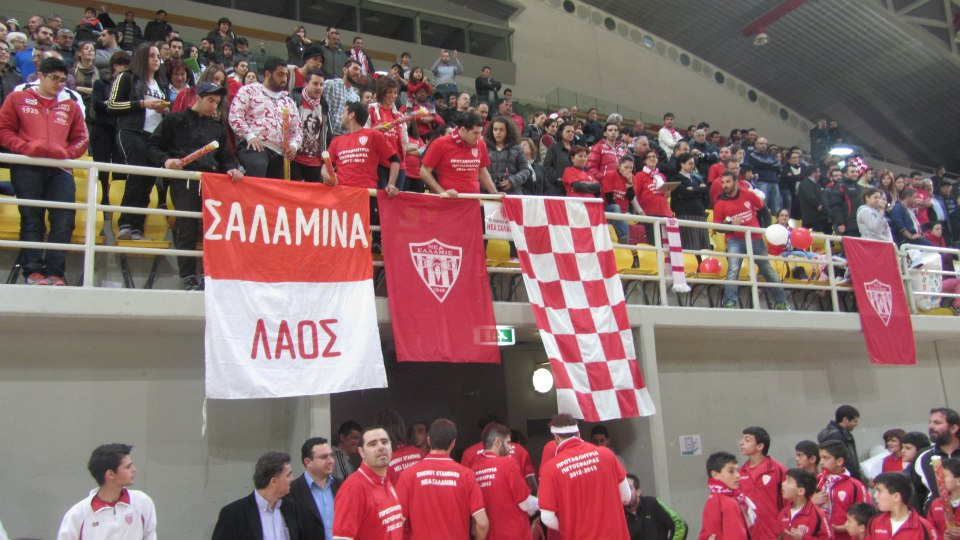
Nea Salamina Famagusta VC fans at Spyros Kyprianou Athletic Center, celebrating Cyprus Volleyball Division 1 2012-2013.

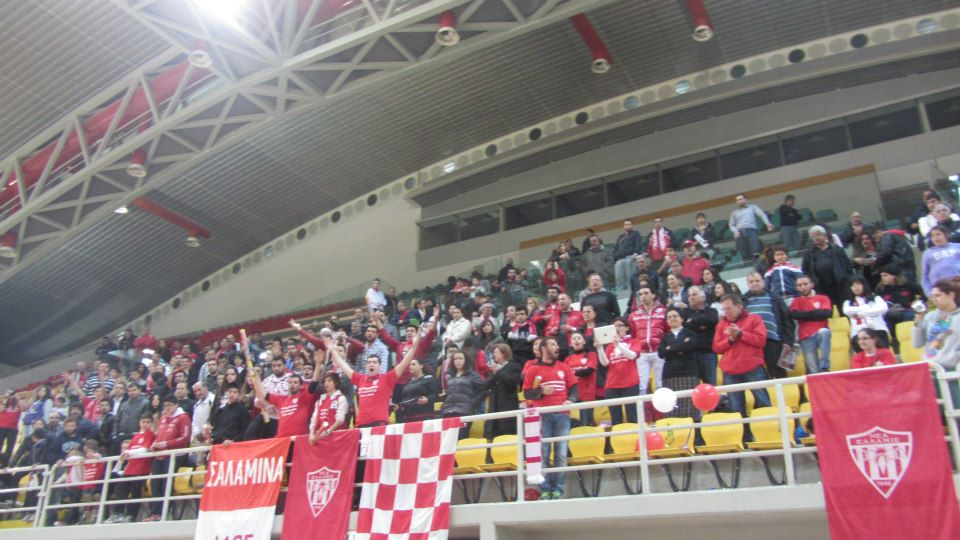
Nea Salamina Famagusta VC fans at Spyros Kyprianou Athletic Center, celebrating Cyprus Volleyball Division 1 2012-2013.
