= 1935–36 Cypriot First Division =

Cypriot First Division
- Season: 1935–36

The 1935–36 Cypriot First Division was the 2nd season of the Cypriot top-level football league.

== Overview ==
It was contested by eight teams, and APOEL won the championship.

== League standings ==
Pos	Team	Pld	W	D	L	GF	GA	GD	Pts
1	APOEL (C)	14	12	0	2	52	15	+37	24
2	Trust	14	9	2	3	39	21	+18	20
3	Lefkoşa Türk Spor Kulübü	14	9	1	4	28	21	+7	19
4	AEL Limassol	14	8	1	5	35	17	+18	17
5	Aris Limassol F.C.	14	8	0	6	37	33	+4	16
6	Olympiakos Nicosia	14	4	1	9	23	56	−33	9
7	Anorthosis Famagusta FC	14	2	1	11	14	38	−24	5
8	EPA Larnaca FC	14	0	2	12	8	35	−27	2

Source: rsssf.com
(C) Champions

== Results ==
Home \ Away	AEL	ANR	APN	ARS	EPA	OLM	TRS	LTS
AEL		6–1	4–0	3–0	–	2–1	0–2	0–1
Anorthosis	0–2		1–5	1–2	–	4–0	0–5	1–3
APOEL	3–2	–		5–1	–	4–1	1–2	3–0
Aris	2–1	5–2	4–2		5–0	9–0	0–2	2–1
EPA	0–4	3–3	0–7	–		1–4	1–1	1–2
Olympiakos	3–8	1–0	0–7	1–3	3–2		3–3	2–1
Trust	4–1	–	1–5	5–1	–	8–2		1–2
LTSK	1–1	2–1	1–6	6–2	–	4–0	3–1	

Legend: Blue = home team win; Yellow = draw; Red = away team win.
