= 1936–37 Cypriot First Division =

Cypriot First Division
- Season: 1936–37

The 1936–37 Cypriot First Division was the 3rd season of the Cypriot top-level football league.

== Overview ==
It was contested by 7 teams, and APOEL F.C. won the championship.

== Locations ==
Locations of teams in the 1936–37 Cypriot First Division

== League standings ==
| Pos | Team | Pld | W | D | L | GF | GA | GD | Pts |
|---|---|---|---|---|---|---|---|---|---|
| 1 | APOEL F.C. (C) | 12 | 8 | 3 | 1 | 41 | 12 | +29 | 19 |
| 2 | Trust | 12 | 9 | 1 | 2 | 38 | 13 | +25 | 19 |
| 3 | Lefkoşa Türk Spor Kulübü | 12 | 5 | 5 | 2 | 29 | 16 | +13 | 15 |
| 4 | AEL Limassol | 12 | 6 | 2 | 4 | 39 | 24 | +15 | 14 |
| 5 | Aris Limassol F.C. | 12 | 2 | 3 | 7 | 20 | 30 | −10 | 7 |
| 6 | Olympiakos Nicosia | 12 | 1 | 3 | 8 | 18 | 49 | −31 | 5 |
| 7 | Anorthosis Famagusta FC | 12 | 2 | 1 | 9 | 10 | 51 | −41 | 5 |

Source: rsssf.com
(C) Champions

== Results ==
| Home \ Away | AEL | ANR | APN | ARS | OLM | TRS | LTS |
|---|---|---|---|---|---|---|---|
| AEL | | 6–1 | 1–3 | 2–2 | 4–2 | 2–0 | 2–2 |
| Anorthosis | 4–1 | | 1–8 | 2–1 | 1–1 | 0–6 | 0–3 |
| APOEL | 4–1 | 6–0 | | 3–1 | 8–0 | 1–3 | 1–1 |
| Aris | 2–5 | 3–2 | 0–1 | | 2–2 | 1–2 | 3–1 |
| Olympiakos | 0–9 | 1–2 | 2–4 | 4–3 | | 0–5 | 3–3 |
| Trust | 5–3 | 6–0 | 1–1 | 4–0 | 3–2 | | 2–3 |
| LTSK | 2–0 | 6–0 | 1–1 | 2–2 | 5–1 | 0–1 | |

Legend: Blue = home team win; Yellow = draw; Red = away team win.
