= 1937–38 Cypriot First Division =

Cypriot First Division
- Season: 1937–38

The 1937–38 Cypriot First Division was the 4th season of the Cypriot top-level football league.

== Overview ==
It was contested by 5 teams, and APOEL F.C. won the championship.

== League standings ==
Pos	Team	Pld	W	D	L	GF	GA	GD	Pts
1	APOEL F.C. (C)	6	5	1	0	29	11	+18	11
2	Trust	4	1	3	0	7	5	+2	5
3	Lefkoşa Türk Spor Kulübü	4	2	1	1	8	10	−2	5
4	AEL Limassol	5	1	1	3	15	14	+1	3
5	Aris Limassol F.C.	5	0	0	5	5	24	−19	0

(C) Champions

== Results ==
Home \ Away	AEL	APL	ARS	TRS	LTS
AEL		1–3	6–0	–	1–1
APOEL	6–5		6–1	–	6–0
Aris	–	2–4		–	–
Trust	–	2–2	4–2		0–0
LTSK	4–2	–	4–0	–	

Legend: Blue = home team win; Yellow = draw; Red = away team win.
