= Anorthosis Famagusta Volleyball (men) =

Volleyball team based in Limassol, Cyprus

Anorthosis Volley
- Full name: Anorthosis Famagusta Volleyball
- Nickname(s): Η Μεγάλη Κυρία (The Old Lady)
- Founded: 11 June 1928; 96 years ago Varosha, Famagusta, Cyprus
- Ground: Themistokleio Sports Center; Limassol, Cyprus
- Capacity: 3,500
- League: Cyprus Volleyball Division 1
- Website: http://www.anorthosisvolley.com/
Home colours

Anorthosis Famagusta Volleyball, known as Anorthosis Volley for short, is the volleyball team of Anorthosis Famagusta, temporarily based in Limassol. Founded in 1928, it is one of the oldest volleyball clubs in Cyprus. Anorthosis have the most title wins in Cyprus, with 21 Cypriot Championship titles and 16 Cypriot Cup titles.

== History ==
The history of department volleyball of Anorthosis is identified with the history of sport in Cyprus. The sport made its appearance in Famagusta in the 1920s with instructor and professor of gymnastics, Anastassis Economides. According to the proceedings of the meetings of the administrative council of Anorthosis, the sport of volleyball was added on 11 June 1928 with water polo. That season they were playing friendly matches, while the volleyball players of Anorthosis they were playing with the colours of the Gymnastic Association Evagoras (where it was creation of members of Anorthosis) at the duration of the Pancyprian Fights. Historians report that the period of 1928–1954 "under the wise man guidance of Anastassis Economides, the team of volleyball gave to Anorthosis a lot of first victories, a lot of glory and filled the rooms of association with bowls and medals". The volleyball teams of Anorthosis participated in the most tournaments that were carried out in the amateur base up to 1972, initially under the aegis of local committee SEGAS Cyprus and afterwards the Pancyprian Federation of Sports, while the athletes of Anorthosis also played a leading part in the distribution of beach volleyball that made an appearance at the end of the 1940s.

In 1972, with the creation of EOPE (Greek Federation of Volleyball) Anorthosis Volleyball Club, developed appreciable activity with climax the conquest Pan-Hellenic of championship (unbeaten) and its attendance in the A' championship of National category. Anorthosis is the unique team that fought in Pan-Hellenic Championship. However, the Turkish invasion deprived from the team of Famagusta, her eve in "giants" the Greek volleyball, after it was forced to withdraw five fighting before the end. If overcame even one opponent in the five games that remained her eve in A' National Category was certain.

The period after the invasion was exceptionally difficult. Substantially without seat, without athletic material… However, the players of Anorthosis exceeded each obstacle and made their association in big protagonist in the sport monopolizing the titles in a lot of cases. With 19 conquests of championship, 14 conquests of cup, 7 Super Cups and 11 Doubles, it is the team with the bigger successes in the Cypriot question volleyball. In the season 2009–10, with trainer Petros Kontos, Anorthosis occupied the 1st place in the championship.

The department of women's volleyball recrudesced for little in Larnaca after the Turkish invasion in 1974. In 1987, with initiative of Level of Anorthosis in Nicosia, the department "is built" in robustly foundations by their fans that live in Nicosia and from then participates regularly in the activities of the KOPE with bigger successes conquest 5 Super Cups, four championships and four cups.

== Honours ==
- Cypriot Championship: 21
  - 1973, 1975, 1977, 1978, 1982, 1986, 1987, 1988, 1989, 1993, 1994, 1995, 1996, 1997, 2005, 2007, 2008, 2009, 2010, 2011, 2014
- Cypriot Cup: 16
  - 1975, 1978, 1980, 1986, 1987, 1988, 1989, 1991, 1993, 1994 1995, 1996, 1998, 2005, 2012, 2014
- Championship Runners-up: 8
  - 1972, 1984, 1985, 1990, 1991, 1992, 2001, 2012
- Cup Finalists: 11
  - 1979, 1981, 1982, 1983, 1985, 1990, 2001, 2004, 2009, 2010, 2011
- Cypriot Super Cup: 7
  - 1993, 1994, 1995, 1996, 2005, 2006, 2009
