= Cyprus Volleyball Division 1 =

Cyprus Volleyball Division 1 is the top level volleyball league in Cyprus. The league is organised by the Cyprus Volleyball Federation since 1978. The league is contested by 9 teams.

== History ==
The Cyprus Volleyball Federation organises the league since 1978.

== Pancyprio protathlima ==
- 1928: G.S. Zinon
- 1929: G.S. Evagoras
- 1931: G.S. Ta Pagcypria
- 1932: A.M.O. Larnaca
- 1933: G.S. Zinon
- 1934: A.E. Limasol
- 1936: G.S. Zinon
- 1938: G.S. Zinon
- 1939: G.S. Olympia
- 1940: G.S. Zinon
- 1945: G.S. Zinon
- 1947: E.S. Alumni Greeks Cyprus
- 1949: G.S. Olympia
- 1954: APOEL
- 1958: Marathon Kato Barosion

=== Organized by SEGAS Cyprus ===
- 1960: Marathon Kato Barosion
- 1962: Marathon Kato Barosion
- 1963: PAEEK

=== Organized by Cypriot Local Committee for Sports ===
- 1969: APOEL
- 1970: APOEL
- 1971: APOEL
- 1972: APOEL

=== Organized by Greek Volleyball Federation Cyprus ===
- 1973: Anorthosis
- 1974: Olympiakos Nicosia
- 1975: Anorthosis
- 1976: Olympiakos Nicosia
- 1977: Anorthosis

=== Organised by Cyprus Volleyball Federation ===
- 1978: Anorthosis
- 1979: APOEL
- 1980: APOEL
- 1981: APOEL
- 1982: Anorthosis
- 1983: APOEL
- 1984: APOEL
- 1985: APOEL
- 1986: Anorthosis
- 1987: Anorthosis
- 1988: Anorthosis
- 1989: Anorthosis
- 1990: Nea Salamis
- 1991: Nea Salamis
- 1992: Pafiakos
- 1993: Anorthosis
- 1994: Anorthosis
- 1995: Anorthosis
- 1996: Anorthosis
- 1997: Anorthosis
- 1998: Nea Salamis
- 1999: Nea Salamis
- 2000: Nea Salamis
- 2001: Nea Salamis
- 2002: Nea Salamis
- 2003: Nea Salamis
- 2004: Pafiakos
- 2005: Anorthosis
- 2006: Pafiakos
- 2007: Anorthosis
- 2008: Anorthosis
- 2009: Anorthosis
- 2010: Anorthosis
- 2011: Anorthosis
- 2012: AEK Karava
- 2013: Nea Salamis
- 2014: Anorthosis
- 2015: Omonia
- 2016: Omonia
- 2017: Omonia
- 2018: Pafiakos
- 2019: Omonia
- 2020: Cancelled due to the COVID-19 pandemic
- 2021: Omonia
- 2022: Omonia
- 2023: Omonia
- 2024: Omonia
- 2025: Pafiakos
- 2026: Pafiakos

=== Performance by club (Organised by Cyprus Volleyball Federation) ===
Club	Winners	Winning seasons
Anorthosis	18	1978, 1982, 1986, 1987, 1988, 1989, 1993, 1994, 1995, 1996, 1997, 2005, 2007, 2008, 2009, 2010, 2011, 2014
Nea Salamis	9	1990, 1991, 1998, 1999, 2000, 2001, 2002, 2003, 2013
Omonia	8	2015, 2016, 2017, 2019, 2021, 2022, 2023, 2024
Pafiakos	6	1992, 2004, 2006, 2018, 2025, 2026
APOEL	6	1979, 1980, 1981, 1983, 1984, 1985
AEK Karava	1	2012
