= APOEL V.C. =

APOEL
- Full name: Athletikos Podosferikos Omilos Ellinon Lefkosias
- Nickname: Τhrylos (The Legend)
- Founded: 1928; 98 years ago
- Ground: Lefkotheo Indoor Arena, Nicosia, Cyprus (Capacity: 2,100)
- League: Cypriot First Division
- 2022-23: 2nd
- Website: Club home page

APOEL Volleyball Club is a Cypriot professional volleyball team based in the city of Nicosia. Since 1928, it has been part of the larger APOEL Nicosia multi-sport club. The team competes in Cyprus Volleyball Division 1, the top-level volleyball league in Cyprus, and plays their home games in the Lefkotheo Indoor Arena.

== History ==
The APOEL Volleyball Club was formed in 1928, two years after the founding of its parent club. The team was one of the twenty founding members of the Cyprus Volleyball Federation.

APOEL V.C. has won a total of 11 First Division championships. Of those titles, seven were won under the aegis of the Cyprus Volleyball Federation (CVF); the remaining four were won under the Cypriot Local Committee for Sports, the predecessor to the CVF. In addition, APOEL has won the Cypriot Cup five times. The 1980s was the most successful decade for the team; between 1979 and 1985, APOEL won the Division 1 championship six times and the Cypriot Cup five times.

Following the turn of the 21st century, the team put together a string of good performances in the 2003–04 CEV Top Teams Cup and 2004–05 CEV Cup, but failed to win another title. After a poor performance in the 2008–09 season, APOEL was relegated to the Second Division and temporarily suspended its participation in the league due to financial difficulties. This was the first and only time a team from the APOEL Nicosia club has been relegated.

Prior to the 2012–13 season, APOEL V.C. was reactivated and participated in the Cypriot Second Division. That year, they won the Second Division championship with a perfect 15-0 record, and earned a promotion to the Cypriot First Division in the 2013–14 season.

In the 2018–19 season, APOEL qualified for the championship playoffs. After suffering a 4-3 loss to Pafiakos in the playoff semifinal series, the club finished in 3rd place. In the 2022-23 season, APOEL enjoyed their most successful campaign in 34 years, qualifying for the playoffs and reaching the championship finals before losing to Omonia.

== Current squad ==
As of 15 September 2022:

No.	Player	Position	Age
1	(Latvia) Toms Vanags	Outside hitter	32
2	(Cyprus) Andrew Christou	Libero	25
4	(Cyprus) Konstantinos Efstathiou	Universal	38
5	(Cyprus) George Chrysostomou	Middle blocker	34
6	(Cyprus) Demetris Apostolou	Outside hitter	38
8	(Cyprus) Constantinos Petrou	Outside hitter	32
9	(Cyprus) Christos Antoniades	Middle blocker	36
10	(Estonia) Markus Uuskari	Opposite	25
11	(Ukraine) Dmytro Shlomin	Setter	33
15	(Cyprus) Stylianos Vereis	Setter	19
17	(Cyprus) Pantelis Panteli	Libero	37
18	(Cyprus) Angelos Georgiou	Outside hitter	18
19	(Greece) Jovan Melka	Head Coach	56
20	(Cyprus) Michael Zacharia	Assistant Coach	43

== League positions ==
Season	Div.	Pos.
1971–72	Div.1	1st
1972–73	Div.1	4th
1973–74	Div.1	4th
1974–75	Div.1	3rd
1975–76	Div.1	4th
1976–77	Div.1	4th
1977–78	Div.1	4th

Season	Div.	Pos.
1978–79	Div.1	1st
1979–80	Div.1	1st
1980–81	Div.1	1st
1981–82	Div.1	2nd
1982–83	Div.1	1st
1983–84	Div.1	1st
1984–85	Div.1	1st

Season	Div.	Pos.
1985–86	Div.1	2nd
1986–87	Div.1	2nd
1987–88	Div.1	2nd
1988–89	Div.1	2nd
1989–90	Div.1	3rd
1990–91	Div.1	8th
1991–92	Div.1	4th

Season	Div.	Pos.
1992–93	Div.1	5th
1993–94	Div.1	5th
1994–95	Div.1	9th
1995–96	Div.1	4th
1996–97	Div.1	4th
1997–98	Div.1	6th
1998–99	Div.1	5th

Season	Div.	Pos.
1999–00	Div.1	3rd
2000–01	Div.1	7th
2001–02	Div.1	4th
2002–03	Div.1	5th
2003–04	Div.1	5th
2004–05	Div.1	6th
2005–06	Div.1	8th

Season	Div.	Pos.
2006–07	Div.1	7th
2007–08	Div.1	6th
2008–09	Div.1	8th
2009–10	Team was inactive	
2010–11	Team was inactive	
2011–12	Team was inactive	
2012–13	Div.2	1st

Season	Div.	Pos.
2013–14	Div.1	7th
2014–15	Div.1	6th
2015–16	Div.1	7th
2016–17	Div.1	4th
2017–18	Div.1	5th
2018-19	Div.1	3rd
2019–20	Div.1	LNF
2020-21	Div.1	6th
2021-22	Div.1	6th
2022-23	Div.1	2nd

== Honours ==
- Cypriot Championship

Winners (11): 1953–54, 1968–69, 1969–70, 1970–71, 1971–72, 1978–79, 1979–80, 1980–81, 1982–83, 1983–84, 1984–85

- Cypriot Cup

Winners (5): 1978–79, 1980–81, 1981–82, 1983–84, 1984–85

- Cypriot Second Division

Winners (1): 2012–13

- Youth trophies (16):

U21: 3 Championships (1991–92, 1992–93, 1995–96)
2 Cups (1994–95, 1995–96)
U18: 5 Championships (1990–91, 1992–93, 1993–94, 1995–96, 1996–97)
U16: 6 Championships (1988–89, 1990–91, 1992–93, 1993–94, 1994–95, 1995–96)

== Women's team ==
=== History ===
The APOEL women's volleyball team was formed in 1974. They won their only title in 1977, when they defeated AEL Limassol 3–2 in the final of the women's Cypriot Cup. The team later suspended its operations in 1990 due to financial problems.

=== League positions ===
Season	Div.	Pos.
1977–78	Div.1	2nd
1978–79	Div.1	2nd
1979–80	Div.1	2nd

Season	Div.	Pos.
1980–81	Div.1	4th
1981–82	Div.1	4th
1982–83	Div.1	4th

Season	Div.	Pos.
1983–84	Div.1	2nd
1984–85	Div.1	2nd
1985–86	Div.1	2nd

Season	Div.	Pos.
1986–87	Div.1	2nd
1987–88	Div.1	2nd
1988–89	Div.1	3rd

Season	Div.	Pos.
1989–90	Div.1	6th

=== Honours ===
- Women's Cup

Winners (1): 1976–77
