= Enosis Neon Trust =

Cypriot football club in Nicosia

Trust AC
- Full name: Trust Athletic Club
- Founded: 1924; 102 years ago
- Dissolved: 1938; 88 years ago
- Ground: Old GSP Stadium, Nicosia
- Capacity: 12,000
- League: Cypriot First Division
- 1938: 2nd
Home colours

Enosis Neon Trust (Greek: Ένωσις Νέων Τραστ, Enosi Neon Trust, "Youth Union Trust") was a Cypriot football club based in Nicosia. It was a founding member of the Cyprus Football Association. The disbanding of the Pancyprian Football Organization (Greek: Παγκύπρια Οργάνωση Ποδοσφαίρου, "Pagkypria Organosi Podosfairou (POP)") in 1924 led to the creation of two new clubs: Trust AC and Panergatikos. Trust took their name from the English word trust.

The first Cypriot Championship and first Cypriot Cup were organized in 1934/35 and Trust won both competitions, thus becoming double winners for the first time in Cypriot football history. In the cup final of 1934/35 Trust beat APOEL 1–0 in the replay final. The first leg was 0-0.

They were again cup winners in 1935/36, when they beat LTSK 4–1, but were beaten in the final the following season by APOEL Nicosia, with the game ending 2–1. After a one-year break, Trust won the cup for the third time in 1938, when they beat AEL Limassol 2–1 in the final. Despite the cups, the club's win in the first league competition in 1935 was the only Championship trophy ever won by the team. Until 1938 the team was always in second position, under the shadow of APOEL, which was constantly champion in that period. In 1938 the first Cypriot Champions disbanded their football club, because of financial problems. The colours of the club were yellow and green. Their stadium was the old GSP Stadium.

== Honours ==
- Cypriot First Division:
  - Champion (1): 1934–35
  - Runner up (3): 1935–36, 1936–37, 1937–38
- Cypriot Cup:
  - Winner (3): 1934–35, 1935–36, 1937–38
  - Runner-up (1): 1936–37
