= Anorthosis Famagusta FC =

Cypriot association football club

Anorthosis Famagusta
- Full name: Ανόρθωση Αμμοχώστου Ποδόσφαιρο Δημόσια ΛΤΔ; Anorthosis Famagusta (Football) Public LTD
- Nicknames: Η Μεγάλη Κυρία (The Old Lady); Ο Φοίνικας (The Phoenix)
- Founded: 30 January 1911; 115 years ago Varosha, Famagusta, Cyprus
- Ground: Antonis Papadopoulos Stadium; Larnaca, Cyprus
- Capacity: 10,230
- Manager: Barak Yitzhaki
- League: First Division
- 2025–26: First Division, 7th of 14
- Website: anorthosisfc.com.cy
Home colours	Away colours

Anorthosis Famagusta (Greek: Ανόρθωση Αμμοχώστου, romanized: Anorthosi Ammochostou) is a Cypriot football club, part of the Famagusta multi-sport club founded in 1911 in Varosha, Famagusta.

Anorthosis was one of the founding clubs of the Cyprus Football Association in 1934. After the Turkish invasion of Cyprus in 1974, they were forced to relocate to Larnaca where they now play their home matches at the Antonis Papadopoulos Stadium. The club's original stadium, GSE, has been abandoned since 1974 and is in poor condition.

One of the most successful clubs in Cypriot football, Anorthosis have won 13 National Championships, 11 cups and 6 Super Cups. Anorthosis is one of three Cypriot clubs never to have been relegated to the second division, was the first Cypriot club to participate in the Champions League group stage, and the second Cypriot club to qualify for the Europa Conference League group stage.

== History ==
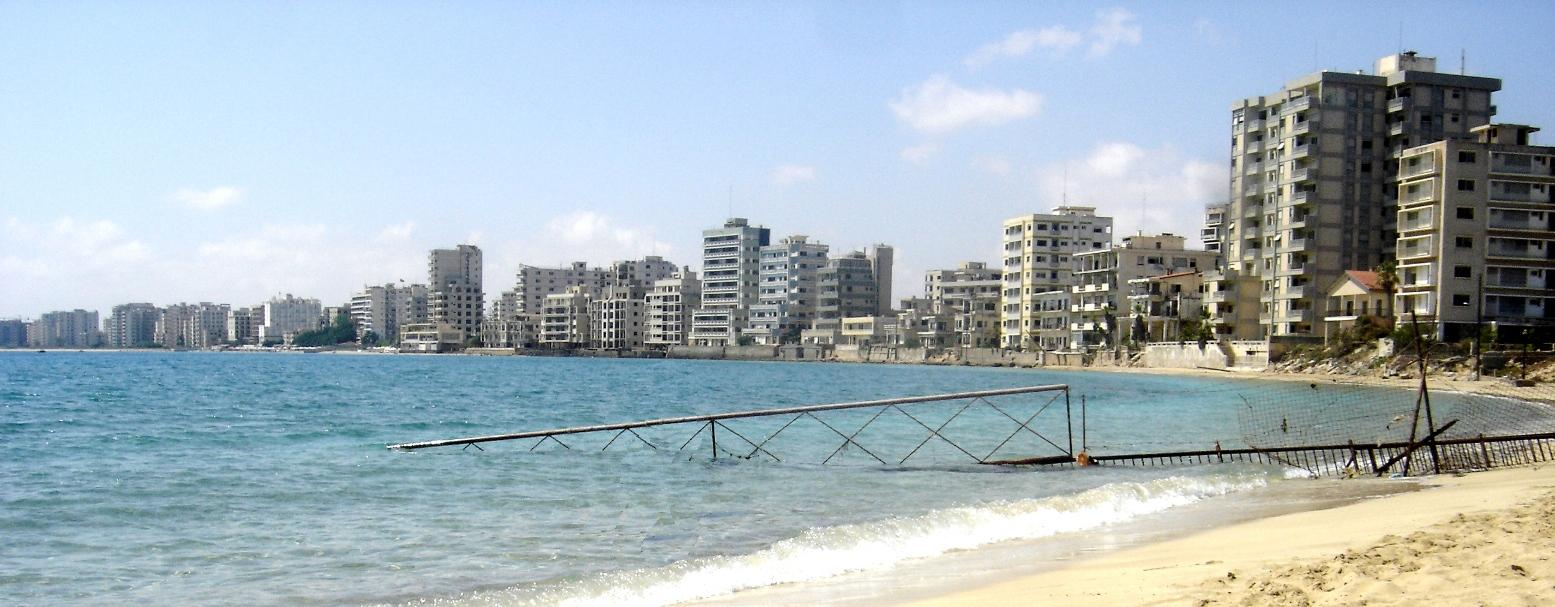
Varosha, the abandoned hometown of Anorthosis Famagusta

=== The early years ===
Anorthosis Famagusta was founded on 30 January 1911. In the early years the club was not focused on sports but mainly national, spiritual, cultural and social activities. The name "Anorthosis", meaning realignment or rectification, reflected the founders' support for then-Prime Minister of Greece Eleftherios Venizelos and his goal of enosis—the political union of Greece and Cyprus. In 1928 it began to develop sporting activities. However, the young men of the club had been active in football much earlier. In the early 1920s they had formed a team with the name "Football Club of Greeks of Varosha" (POEV, Greek: Ποδοσφαιρικής Ομάδας Ελλήνων Βαρωσίων). In 1929, POEV officially joined Anorthosis, and its players (all of whom were also members of Anorthosis) formed the club's first football team.

=== 1930s ===
In 1930–31, Anorthosis participated in and won the first Famagusta provincial football tournament, organised by Evagoras Gymnastic Club (G.S.E.).

In 1932, Anorthosis participated in the first island-wide tournament, the city championship (Greek: πρωτάθλημα πόλεων), which was organised by Pezoporikos Larnaca and used a knock-out system. The second city championship was organised by APOEL in 1933. 8 teams participated, however it was controversial with several teams making complaints about the integrity of their matches, while Anorthosis and Poseidon Limassol withdrew from participation. The third edition was organised by AEL, with Anorthosis finishing in sixth place.

The fourth tournament was due to be organised by Anorthosis. However, after the announcement of a championship in Nicosia by Trust (to celebrate the tenth anniversary of its foundation), and a resulting dispute between the two clubs, as well as other issues on which there were disagreements (Olympiakos Nicosia and Aris Limassol raised the issue of players freely moving from one club to another), the clubs decided to create an authority which would be responsible for organising the championships. Thus, on 23 September 1934, the Cyprus Football Association was established, with Anorthosis and 7 other clubs as the founding members.

In 1934–35 the first official Cypriot Championship was held by the CFA. Anorthosis played their home games at the G.S.E. and finished in 5th place. The Cypriot Cup was also held for the first time where Anorthosis were eliminated by Trust in the semi-finals. In 1935–36, Anorthosis finished in 7th place in the 8 team championship, followed by finishing in bottom position in 1936–37. In 1937 the club ceased the operation of its football department due to financial difficulties, and was removed from the CFA. During the following years, the G.S.E. was closed under the control of the British Army.

=== 1940s ===
After the team had disbanded in 1937, its players had joined other teams, mainly EPA and Pezoporikos. In 1945 the club decided to re-establish the football team. Several of the former players rejoined Anorthosis as well as some new players. Anorthosis joined the Cypriot Second Division for the 1945–46 season; at the time, the Second Division also included reserve teams of the First Division clubs. Anorthosis would face the reserve team of APOEL in a two-leg final to determine the champion. In the first match, APOEL won 5–3 while the second match was a 1–1 draw. The B team of APOEL won the championship, but Anorthosis were promoted to the First Division because APOEL were not allowed to be represented by multiple teams in the same division. Additionally, the CFA wanted to promote Anorthosis because there were no other First Division clubs from Famagusta at the time.

Anorthosis reached the final of the 1946–47 Cypriot Cup. They would lose 4–1 to APOEL.

In 1947, Anorthosis along with EPA and Pezoporikos requested a change in the constitution of the CFA with the main demand being the rotation of presidency between all cities. The clubs felt that they were being unfairly treated relative to teams from Nicosia, where the CFA was based, and that particularly APOEL were treated favourably by the officials. The request was discussed at a general assembly of the CFA on 27 August 1947, but only those three teams voted in favour of the proposal. Following the result, Anorthosis, EPA and Pezoporikos withdrew from the CFA and formed their own organisation, the "Football Athletic Federation of Cyprus" (PAOK, Greek: Ποδοσφαιρική Αθλητική Ομοσπονδία Κύπρου), based in Larnaca. Five additional clubs (AMOL Limassol, Larnaka Türk, Mağusa Türk Gücü, Mağusa Türk Ujiu and Çetinkaya Türk) joined this federation. The conflict between the two federations ended after one year when PAOK was dissolved and Anorthosis, EPA and Pezoporikos were reintegrated into the CFA in the autumn of 1948.

Anorthosis finished in second place in the 1948–49 First Division. They played in the Cypriot Cup final in April 1949 at the G.S.P. in Nicosia, where they were trailing 3–2 against APOEL until the 87th minute when the game was stopped due to incidents among the players and crowd trouble. The game was replayed in June at the same stadium, with Anorthosis victorious 3–0 and winning their first major trophy.

=== 1950s ===
The 1949–50 season was historic for Anorthosis, as they won the Cypriot First Division for the first time, finishing one point ahead of EPA Larnaca. The two sides also met in the final of the Cypriot Cup, in which Anorthosis was leading 1–0 until the final minutes when EPA won a penalty. The kick was successful, but the referee ordered a retaking. The second attempt was unsuccessful and the EPA fans invaded the pitch, causing the match to be abandoned after 82 minutes. The CFA ordered a replay of the match, which EPA won 2–1. Anorthosis felt they were wronged and that a replay should never have been ordered, as the match was stopped due to the fault of the opposing team.

In the following years, Anorthosis did not challenge for the league and they could not progress past the semi-final stage of the cup in any year. Starting in 1956–57, however, the team's fortunes changed, as they won 5 championships and 3 cups in 8 years. Anorthosis won the 1956–57 First Division without losing a game, and then retained the title in 1957–58. The following year no championship was held due to the Cypriot War of Independence. However, the Cypriot Cup, which had not been played since 1954–55 for the same reason, was held in 1958–59 in response to the cancelled championship. Anorthosis would win the trophy, defeating AEL 1–0 in the final.

=== 1960s ===
In the 1959–60 season, Anorthosis won a third consecutive league title and fourth overall. The following season they finished as runners up to Omonoia. The Cypriot First Division and the Cypriot Cup were both held in the 1961–62 season, the first time both competitions had been played in a season since 1954–55. Anorthosis won the championship and defeated Olympiakos Nicosia 5–2 in the cup final, achieving the first league and cup double in their history. They were awarded the Shield of Pakkos in 1962 without playing the match, as they had won both the league and cup the previous season.

The following season Anorthosis won the First Division for the sixth time and again reached the Cypriot Cup final. They lost the trophy to APOEL, after a 2–2 draw and then a 1–0 loss in the replay. The two sides met again for the 1963 Shield of Pakkos, which APOEL won 1–0.

The 1963–64 league season was suspended in December 1963 due to intercommunal violence on the island and was not resumed. In the Cypriot Cup, Anorthosis won the trophy beating APOEL 3–0 in the final.

For the rest of the decade, Anorthosis were not competitive for any titles, with the exception of the 1966–67 First Division, in which they finished in third place, one point behind the champions Olympiakos.

=== 1970s ===
In the 1970s, Anorthosis did not claim a single league title. However, they managed to win two cups, the first of which was in 1970–71 when they defeated Omonoia 1–0 in a replay at the G.S.E. after a 1–1 draw in Nicosia.

The decade proved to be a terrible time in the club's history due to what happened off the pitch. On 14 August 1974, Famagusta was occupied by Turkish troops following the Turkish invasion of Cyprus, and Anorthosis was made a refugee club. The players and fans of Anorthosis were dispersed throughout the free areas of Cyprus. Anorthosis Famagusta continued with a temporary base in Larnaca.

Despite the difficulties that the club was facing, Anorthosis managed to finish in sixth position in the 1974–75 First Division. In addition, they reached the 1974–75 Cup final and lifted the trophy after a 3–2 victory against Enosis Neon Paralimni.

=== 1980s ===
The 1980s was another disappointing period in the history of the Anorthosis football team, as they didn't win a single trophy in this time. In 1981–82, Anorthosis had the worst season in their history until that point, as they were involved in a relegation battle. They eventually finished in ninth place. In 1982–83 they finished as runners up by just three points to Omonoia. In 1984–85 they once again fought for the championship but after a poor end to the season they finished third. Anorthosis only managed to reach the semi-final stage of the Cypriot Cup once during the decade, in 1982–83, when they were eliminated by Omonoia.

=== 1990s ===
In the 1990s, Anorthosis returned to winning titles and became one of the permanent contenders for the championship. In 1990–91 Anorthosis finished in second place, three points behind Apollon. They finished in the same position in 1991–92, this time two points behind APOEL. In 1993–94 they again finished in second place for the third time in four years, this time 2 points behind Apollon. In the same season Anorthosis reached the Cypriot Cup final, where they were beaten 1–0 by Omonoia.

After a 32-year wait, Anorthosis finally won their seventh league title in 1994–95. They also won the CFA Shield for the first time in 33 years at the start of the 1995–96 season, defeating APOEL on penalties after a 1–1 draw. Anorthosis finished second in the 1995–96 First Division.

Over the next four seasons, with Kikis Konstantinou as president and Dušan Mitošević as manager, Anorthosis would be the permanent champions of Cyprus. To begin with, they won the 1996–97 First Division. They lost the 1997 CFA Shield match 2–1 against APOEL, but won both the First Division and Cypriot Cup titles in 1997–98, the second league and cup double in their history. They defeated Apollon 3–1 in the cup final, and then again 4–1 in the 1998 CFA Shield match.

The 1998–99 First Division finished with Anorthosis as champions for the tenth time, beating Omonoia on goal difference thanks to an all-time record 95 goals scored in the first division. They reached the Cypriot Cup final once again, but were defeated 2–0 by APOEL. They won the 1999 CFA Shield by beating APOEL 2–0.

=== 2000s ===
Anorthosis won their fourth consecutive league title in 1999–2000, and also won the 2000 CFA Shield. In the 2001–02 First Division, Anorthosis lost the title to APOEL by just one point. However, they continued their successful era by beating Ethnikos Achna in the Cypriot Cup final, earning them another appearance in the CFA Shield match, which they lost 4–2 against APOEL. They again lost the league title by just one point in 2002–03, this time finishing second behind Omonoia. The cup final was once again won by Anorthosis in 2002–03, this time on penalties after a 0–0 draw against AEL. They lost the 2003 CFA Shield match 3–2 against Omonoia.

In 2004, Temur Ketsbaia, who was in his second successful spell as an Anorthosis player, became player-manager and remained in charge of the team until 2009, leading the team to multiple trophies and the biggest achievement of the club, participation in the UEFA Champions League group stages.

In 2004–05, Anorthosis won the league again. They lost the 2005 CFA Shield match on penalties against Omonoia. Anorthosis won the 2006–07 Cypriot Cup final 3–2 against Omonoia, and the 2007 CFA Shield 2–1 against APOEL. Anorthosis won their 13th First Division title in 2007–08, going undefeated for the full season. They reached the Cypriot Cup final against APOEL, which they lost 2–0. APOEL won the CFA Shield match in 2008 with a score of 1–0.

In the summer of 2008, Anorthosis became the first Cypriot club to qualify for the group stages of a European competition. They defeated Olympiacos CFP in the qualifying round to secure a place in Group B of the 2008–09 Champions League. Despite being heavy underdogs, Anorthosis still had a chance to progress to the knockout round ahead of the final group game, after producing some great results. They beat Panathinaikos in the first match 3–1 at home, drew twice with Werder Bremen and drew their home game against José Mourinho's Inter Milan, who would win the competition the following season.

=== 2010s ===
After the most successful decade in the club's history in the 2000s, Anorthosis would not win a single trophy in the next decade. They suffered from financial problems in the first years of the 2010s, although in the 2012–13 season they fought for the championship, and were leading by 6 points after 20 weeks. However, they had a poor run of results and ultimately finished in second position.

In July 2013, following elimination from the Europa League second qualifying round at the hands of Gefle IF, the club entered a financial crisis and forced club president Savvas Kakos to step down from his position. A general assembly of the club followed and in August, Achilleas Nicolaou was elected as the new president. His first actions were to find a solution for the financial problems and with the help of financial contribution by the fans and Christos Poullaidis, who was deputy president at the time, he succeeded to keep the club alive. In October, Nicolaou stepped down as president with Poullaidis as his successor.

In 2013–14, Anorthosis finished outside of the top 5 positions in the league for the first time in 24 years, and they did not finish higher than third position for the rest of the decade. In June 2019, club legend Temur Ketsbaia returned for his second spell as manager.

=== 2020s ===
In the 2019–20 Cypriot First Division, Anorthosis were equal on points with first-placed Omonia but ranked second due to a worse head-to-head record, when the season was abandoned due to the COVID-19 pandemic. The following season in 2020–21, Anorthosis were just 5 points behind leaders Omonia with 10 games to go, however they earned just 6 points in the remainder of the season, finishing in fourth and 22 points adrift of the eventual champions. Silverware would return to Anorthosis that season, as they were 2–1 victors after extra time against Olympiakos Nicosia in the 2020–21 Cypriot Cup final.

The cup victory earned Anorthosis a place in the 2021–22 Europa League qualifying rounds. They lost to Rapid Wien, and dropped into the Europa Conference League playoffs. They beat Hapoel Be'er Sheva 3–1 on aggregate and secured their return to the group stage of a European competition. They were drawn in Group B with Gent, Partizan and Flora. Despite losing their opening two games and then drawing both games against Flora after leading 2–0, they were still in with a chance of qualifying for the knockout stages ahead of the final game thanks to a spectacular long-distance goal by Lazaros Christodoulopoulos which gave them a shock 1–0 home victory over Gent. They would draw 1–1 in Belgrade against Partizan, missing out by 2 points on progression to the knockout rounds.

In the 2021–22 league season, Anorthosis were hopeful of qualifying to the Champions League by finishing in the top 2 positions with two games remaining in the season, however a 1–1 draw against APOEL and a 3–0 home defeat to Aris Limassol left Anorthosis in fifth position and outside of the European qualification positions. Manager Temur Ketsbaia left the club in June 2022 by mutual consent.

The first round of the 2022–23 Cypriot First Division saw Anorthosis out of the Championship playoffs, with the team eventually finishing in seventh place. The team's struggles forced Christos Poullaidis to step down from his position, with Cypriot businessman and former vice-president of the club, Andreas Santis taking over as the new president. Antonio Prieto was appointed as the team's technical director, and David Gallego was appointed as head coach ahead of the 2023–24 season.

== Colours and badge ==
Anorthosis have worn blue and white colours for the majority of their history, chosen because they were the colours of the Greek flag. While often using a striped pattern, Anorthosis has had much variety in their home shirts, with many different uses of the colours blue and/or white. The shade of blue has varied over the years, and Anorthosis home shirts have been worn with either blue or white shorts, and blue, white or black socks. The inaugural football team of Anorthosis wore Byzantine-inspired black and yellow kits, which was brought back as the home kit for the centenary year of the club in the 2011–12 season. Anorthosis have often used black for their away or third kit since 1974, intended to represent their lost hometown Famagusta. In 2020–21, Anorthosis used a white third kit with a photograph of Varosha's seafront printed on the front of the shirt. For the 110th birthday of the club, a limited edition shirt of only 110 units was released, using the colour gold for the first time and the original crest. The gold is meant to represent the colour of the sand of Famagusta's coast. A map of the town is also printed on the kit.

Anorthosis have used the phoenix as a symbol for most of the history of the club. In 1970, Anorthosis adopted as their first crest an image of the phoenix and the club's name in Greek, ΑΝΟΡΘΩΣΙΣ, inside a circle. The crest remained for the next 15 years, though it never appeared on the shirts. In 1985, Anorthosis changed their crest for the first time, though again it never appeared on the shirts. In 1990, Anorthosis announced their first official crest as a part of an attempt to modernise the club, that was used on the shirts. It featured the image of a burning phoenix and the club name in Greek, as well as 1911, the year the club was established. In 2000 under president Kikis Konstantinou, the club's crest was changed again as a part of an attempt to further modernise and capitalise on new marketing opportunities. The new badge featured a blue phoenix standing over the fire. It lasted for the next 11 years, with some minor modifications such as the use of different colours, appearances of the phoenix and the addition of a star to celebrate the tenth championship of the club. For the centenary season in 2011–12, the new president Savvas Kakos announced a special emblem to celebrate 100 years that featured the year of the club's establishment and the current year, 1911 and 2011 respectively, on the crest. In 2012, Anorthosis made some alterations to the 100 years crest, which became the permanent new logo of the club. In 2020, the football department came up with a new logo that was intended to help with the marketing of the club. The blue phoenix rising from the flames was no longer surrounded by the traditional shield and its wings shaped the blue and white stripes using negative areas. Above the phoenix, the year 1911 is featured as well as a gold star representing the 10 championships. Initially, the new logo was used on the 2020–21 shirts, however after backlash from fans of the club it was removed, and the 2012 version was restored.

=== Kit suppliers and shirt sponsors ===
Period	Kit manufacturer	Shirt sponsor
2000–2003	Adidas	KOSTIS
2003–2004	Adidas	Alliance Reinsurance
2004–2005	Adidas	miVision
2005–2007	Diadora	miVision
2007–2008	Umbro	Quality Group
2008	Nike	Quality Group
2008–2009	Puma	Quality Group
2009–2010	Puma	Betfair
2010–2014	Puma	Cytamobile-Vodafone
2014–2016	Macron	Cytamobile-Vodafone
2016–2017	Macron	Olympia Sports Resort
2017–2018	Nike	N/A
2018–2019	Nike	megabetplus.com.cy
2019–2020	Nike	Stoiximan.gr
2020–2021	Nike	Allea Group
2021–2022	Adidas	Allea Group
2022–2023	Adidas	Fonbet
2023-2024	Puma	Fonbet
2024-2025	Errea	Novibet
2025-Present	Adidas	Novibet

== Stadium ==
Antonis Papadopoulos Stadium
- Full name: Στάδιο Αντώνης Παπαδόπουλος
- Location: Larnaca, Cyprus
- Owner: Anorthosis Famagusta
- Operator: Anorthosis Famagusta
- Capacity: 10,230 (full seated)
- Surface: Grass
- Scoreboard: Yes

Construction
- Built: 1983–1986
- Opened: 1986
- Renovated: 1997, 2006, 2007, 2008, 2012, 2018
- Expanded: 1997

Anorthosis, in order to recover from their forced relocation from the GSE Stadium, had to build a new one. Antonis Papadopoulos Stadium is the home of Anorthosis Famagusta and it was built in 1986 in the city of Larnaca. The ground was given the name of a person who helped Anorthosis in various ways through the years, he was a fighter in EOKA war for Cyprus independence and unity with Greece and Anorthosis helped the war and he was also a very talented football player of Anorthosis and later a manager. The initial capacity of the ground was about 6,000 but gradually increased during the years to 13,000. With a major reconditioning in 1998, capacity was reduced to 10,230 (all seated).

In 2005 the east stand was named "Quality Stand" after the club's main sponsor. "Quality Stand" is a two-story stand which holds the newly built VIP boxes (upper story), press room, dressing rooms, and bar. In 2006, the stadium went through another reconditioning including the building of VIP Boxes in the upper section of west stand, the launching of the automatic ticketing issue and entrance system, the replacing of the metal front fence with clear acrylic glass for security reasons and for maximized field view. Also, some other facilities are offered in the west stand such as new restrooms, bar, and fans' shop.

The stadium also is approved by UEFA for European games. It has hosted some matches of the Cyprus national football team. In this stadium, Cyprus achieved its greatest success against Spain by a score 3–2. On 16 May 1992, the stadium hosted the 1992 UEFA European Under-16 Football Championship Third position final between Italy and Portugal, which Italy won 1–0.

On 23 November 2011, D. Ellinas group signed a contract with Anorthosis to build new offices for Antonis Papadopoulos Stadium. The old offices of the stadium will be a joint area outside the locker room, journalistic theory, clinics and other. The cost is €400,000 but the D. Ellinas group will build the offices for free in exchange for advertisements on the Anorthosis side.

== Supporters ==
The fans of Anorthosis are spread throughout Cyprus due to the occupation of Famagusta by the Turkish military, with many living near Larnaca where the current stadium is located. There are supporters associations all over the island and in other countries as well including Greece, the UK and the USA. In 2022, a study found Anorthosis to have the support of 15.1% of football fans in Cyprus, making it the third most popular team behind Omonia and APOEL.

The main ultras group of Anorthosis was formed in 1994 and is known as 'Maxhtec', meaning 'Fighters' (Greek: Μαχητές, romanized: Makhités, stylised as MAXHTEC). The idea is to never stop fighting until they return to their beloved town of Famagusta. The emblem of Maxhtec is an ancient warrior helmet, similar to those worn by the Spartans. The Anorthosis ultras have a friendly relationship with their counterparts from Russian club Dynamo Moscow and Serbian club OFK Beograd.

The Anorthosis fans are known for being very passionate about their team, their lost hometown Famagusta and their Greek Cypriot heritage. In the stands there can often be seen many Greek flags, Greek Orthodox flags and tributes to former EOKA members, many of whom were also members of Anorthosis, such as Grigoris Afxentiou.

== Players ==
=== First-team squad ===
As of 14 August 2026

Note: Flags indicate national team as defined under FIFA eligibility rules; some limited exceptions apply. Players may hold more than one non-FIFA nationality.

No.	Pos.	Nation	Player
1	GK	CYP	Konstantinos Panagi
2	DF	ENG	Simranjit Thandi
4	MF	CYP	Kostakis Artymatas (captain)
5	DF	POR	Kiko
7	FW	HUN	Tamás Kiss
8	MF	NED	Yoell van Nieff
9	FW	CPV	Alessio da Cruz
11	FW	BEL	Babacar Dione
18	MF	CYP	Stefanos Charalambous
20	MF	GHA	Clifford Aboagye
21	FW	POR	Rafael Lopes
22	DF	CYP	Konstantinos Sergiou
28	GK	NOR	Jacob Karlstrøm

No.	Pos.	Nation	Player
31	DF	SWE	Emil Bergström
32	FW	ARG	Elián Sosa (on loan from AEK Athens)
33	DF	SUI	Tobias Schättin
36	MF	NED	Stijn Middendorp
44	DF	SRB	Nemanja Tošić
45	DF	BRA	Gabriel Furtado
47	DF	CYP	Andreas Karamanolis
48	MF	CYP	Michalis Ioannou
50	MF	CYP	Dimitrianos Juliou
57	FW	CYP	Evagoras Charalambous
70	FW	CYP	Marios Ilia
79	GK	HUN	Martin Sebok
88	MF	CYP	Andreas Chrysostomou

=== Out on loan ===
Note: Flags indicate national team as defined under FIFA eligibility rules; some limited exceptions apply. Players may hold more than one non-FIFA nationality.

No.	Pos.	Nation	Player

=== Retired numbers ===
14 – (Georgia (country)) Temur Ketsbaia (1992–1994, 2002–2007), club legend

== Staff ==
=== Coaching staff ===
As of 19 October 2026

Position	Name
Manager	Vacant
Assistant	Vacant
Goalkeeping coach	(Cyprus) Antonis Georgallides
Analyst	(Cyprus) Stelios Antoniou

== Honours ==
Type	Competition	Titles	Seasons	Ref
Domestic	Cypriot First Division	13	1949–50, 1956–57, 1957–58, 1959–60, 1961–62, 1962–63, 1994–95, 1996–97, 1997–98, 1998–99, 1999–2000, 2004–05, 2007–08	
Domestic	Cypriot Cup	11	1948–49, 1958–59, 1961–62, 1963–64, 1970–71, 1974–75, 1997–98, 2001–02, 2002–03, 2006–07, 2020–21	
Domestic	Cypriot Super Cup	6	1962, 1995, 1998, 1999, 2000, 2007	

- record *^{s} shared record

== See also ==
- Anorthosis Famagusta F.C. in European football
- List of Anorthosis Famagusta F.C. managers
- List of Anorthosis Famagusta presidents
- Anorthosis Famagusta H.C. (handball section)
