= 1977–78 Cypriot Cup =

Tournament details
- Country: Cyprus
- Dates: 14 December 1977 – 11 June 1978
- Teams: 40

Final positions
- Champions: APOEL (10th title)
- Runners-up: Olympiakos Nicosia

The 1977–78 Cypriot Cup was the 36th edition of the Cypriot Cup. A total of 40 clubs entered the competition. It began on 14 December 1977 with the preliminary round and concluded on 11 June 1978 with the final which was held at GSP Stadium. APOEL won their 10th Cypriot Cup trophy after beating Olympiakos Nicosia 3–0 in the final.

== Format ==
In the 1977–78 Cypriot Cup, participated all the teams of the Cypriot First Division, the Cypriot Second Division and the Cypriot Third Division.

The competition consisted of six knock-out rounds. In all rounds each tie was played as a single leg and was held at the home ground of one of the two teams, according to the draw results. Each tie winner was qualifying to the next round. If a match was drawn, extra time was following. If extra time was drawn, there was a replay at the ground of the team who were away for the first game. If the rematch was also drawn, then extra time was following and if the match remained drawn after extra time the winner was decided by penalty shoot-out.

The cup winner secured a place in the 1978–79 European Cup Winners' Cup.

== Preliminary round ==
In the preliminary round participated 7 teams of the 1977–78 Cypriot First Division, 5 teams of the 1977–78 Cypriot Second Division and 4 teams of the 1977–78 Cypriot Third Division.

Team 1	Result	Team 2
(A) Alki Larnaca	5 - 0	Iraklis Gerolakkou (B)
(A) Anorthosis Famagusta	14 - 1	Olimpiada Neapolis (C)
(A) Apollon Limassol	10 - 0	Faros Acropoleos (C)
(C) Doxa Katokopias	1 - 2	Ermis Aradippou (B)
(A) EPA Larnaca	7 - 1	ASIL Lysi (B)
(B) Neos Aionas Trikomou	0 - 2	Digenis Akritas Morphou (A)
(A) AC Omonia	13 - 2	AEK Ammochostos (C)
(B) PAEEK	0 - 1	Nea Salamis Famagusta (A)

== First round ==
9 clubs from the 1977–78 Cypriot First Division, 10 clubs from the 1977–78 Cypriot Second Division and 5 clubs from the 1977–78 Cypriot Third Division were added.

Team 1	Result	Team 2
(A) Alki Larnaca	2 - 0	Adonis Idaliou (C)
(A) Anorthosis Famagusta	1 - 1, 0 - 4	Enosis Neon Paralimni (A)
(B) Omonia Aradippou	0 - 1	APOEL (A)
(A) Aris Limassol	2 - 3	AC Omonia (A)
(B) Ethnikos Assia	0 - 1	Ethnikos Achna (B)
(C) Achilleas Kaimakli	1 - 6	AEL Limassol (A)
(C) Anagennisi Deryneia	1 - 0	Parthenon Zodeia (B)
(C) ENAD Ayiou Dometiou	0 - 1	APOP Paphos (A)
(A) EPA Larnaca	2 - 1	Digenis Akritas Morphou (A)
(B) Ermis Aradippou	1 - 0	Akritas Chlorakas (B)
(B) Keravnos Strovolou	3 - 2	Evagoras Paphos (A)
(C) AEK Kythreas	2 - 0	AEM Morphou (B)
(B) Othellos Athienou	3 - 1	Orfeas Nicosia (B)
(A) Olympiakos Nicosia	2 - 1	Apollon Limassol (A)
(A) Nea Salamis Famagusta	3 - 1	Enosis Neon THOI Lakatamia (B)
(A) Chalkanoras Idaliou	0 - 3	Pezoporikos Larnaca (A)

== Second round ==
Team 1	Result	Team 2
(A) AEL Limassol	12 - 0	Othellos Athienou (B)
(A) Alki Larnaca	4 - 0	AEK Kythreas (C)
(A) APOP Paphos	0 - 2	AC Omonia (A)
(B) Ermis Aradippou	0 - 4	EPA Larnaca (A)
(B) Keravnos Strovolou	1 - 0	Pezoporikos Larnaca (A)
(A) Olympiakos Nicosia	2 - 1	Ethnikos Achna (B)
(A) Enosis Neon Paralimni	7 - 1	Anagennisi Deryneia (C)
(A) Nea Salamis Famagusta	0 - 0, 1 - 4	APOEL (A)

== Quarter-finals ==
Team 1	Result	Team 2
(A) AEL Limassol	1 - 3	Olympiakos Nicosia (A)
(A) Alki Larnaca	0 - 1	EPA Larnaca (A)
(A) APOEL	1 - 0	Keravnos Strovolou (B)
(A) Enosis Neon Paralimni	1 - 3	AC Omonia (A)

== Semi-finals ==
Team 1	Result	Team 2
(A) EPA Larnaca	0 - 0, 0 - 1	Olympiakos Nicosia (A)
(A) AC Omonia	0 - 2	APOEL (A)

== Final ==
11 June 1978

APOEL	3–0	Olympiakos Nicosia
Takis Antoniou 20'; Andros Miamiliotis 25'; Markos Markou 33'

GSP Stadium, Nicosia
- APOEL: G. Pantziaras (75' Koupanos), Menelaou, Stephanou, Stavrou, N. Pantziaras, Stephanis, Miamiliotis (75' Ermogenidis), K. Pantziaras, P. Chatzithomas, Markou, Antoniou.
- Olympiacos: Barnabas, Papageorgiou, Lucas, Georgiou, Faketti, Aristidou, Mario (70' Ethimiadis), Kalotheou, Koulis (23' Bouras), Mavris, Savvidis.

Cypriot Cup 1977–78 Winners
APOEL
10th title

== Sources ==
- "1977/78 Cyprus Cup". Rec.Sport.Soccer Statistics Foundation. 2017-08-24.
- ΚΟΠ (Magazine), 30 March 2016, p. 72

== Bibliography ==
- Gavreilides, Michalis; Papamoiseos, Stelios (2001). Ένας αιώνας Κυπριακό ποδόσφαιρο [One century Cypriot football] (in Greek). Nicosia: The writer. pp. 102–103. ISBN 9963-8720-1-8.
- Stephanidis, Giorgos (2003). 40 χρόνια κυπριακές ομάδες στην Ευρώπη [40 years Cypriot teams in Europe] (in Greek). Nicosia: Haravgi. p. 110. ISBN 9963-8841-1-3.

== See also ==
- Cypriot Cup
- 1977–78 Cypriot First Division
