= 1975–76 Cypriot Cup =

Tournament details
- Country: Cyprus
- Dates: 8 May 1976 – 27 June 1976
- Teams: 35

Final positions
- Champions: APOEL (9th title)
- Runners-up: Alki Larnaca

The 1975–76 Cypriot Cup was the 34th edition of the Cypriot Cup. A total of 35 clubs entered the competition. It began on 8 May 1976 with the preliminary round and concluded on 27 June 1976 with the final which was held at Tsirio Stadium. APOEL won their 9th Cypriot Cup trophy after beating Alki Larnaca 6–0 in the final.

== Format ==
In the 1975–76 Cypriot Cup, participated all the teams of the Cypriot First Division, the Cypriot Second Division and the Cypriot Third Division.

The competition consisted of six knock-out rounds. In all rounds each tie was played as a single leg and was held at the home ground of one of the two teams, according to the draw results. Each tie winner was qualifying to the next round. If a match was drawn, extra time was following. If extra time was drawn, there was a replay at the ground of the team who were away for the first game. If the rematch was also drawn, then extra time was following and if the match remained drawn after extra time the winner was decided by penalty shoot-out.

The cup winner secured a place in the 1976–77 European Cup Winners' Cup.

== Preliminary round ==
In the preliminary round 2 teams of each category participated. The teams were decided by drawing. Achilleas Kaimakli, a team of 1975–76 Cypriot Third Division didn't want to participate in the 1975–76 Cyprus Cup, so only 7 of the 8 teams of the 1975–76 Cypriot Third Division participated.

Team 1	Result	Team 2
(A) Anorthosis Famagusta	2 - 1	Akritas Chlorakas (C)
(B) Omonia Aradippou	2 - 0	Keravnos Strovolou (B)
(A) Evagoras Paphos	3 - 2	Anagennisi Deryneia (C)

== First round ==
8 clubs from the 1976–77 Cypriot First Division, 7 clubs from the 1976–77 Cypriot Second Division and 7 clubs from the 1976–77 Cypriot Third Division were added.

Team 1	Result	Team 2
(A) Alki Larnaca	1 - 0	AEL Limassol (A)
(A) Anorthosis Famagusta	3 - 0	PAEEK (B)
(A) APOEL	8 - 0	ENAD Ayiou Dometiou (B)
(A) Apollon Limassol	4 - 0	Ethnikos Achna (B)
(B) APOP Paphos	4 - 2	Doxa Katokopias (C)
(A) Aris Limassol	5 - 1	Ethnikos Asteras Limassol (C)
(A) ASIL Lysi	0 - 0, 2 - 0	AEM Morphou (B)
(A) EPA Larnaca	3 - 2	Ethnikos Assia (B)
(C) Ermis Aradippou	0 - 1	Pezoporikos Larnaca (A)
(A) Evagoras Paphos	10 - 1	AEK Kythreas (C)
(B) Iraklis Gerolakkou	1 - 1, 1 - 1 (4 - 2 pen.)	Parthenon Zodeia (B)
(B) Othellos Athienou	1 - 0	Omonia Aradippou (B)
(A) AC Omonia	4 - 1	Olympiakos Nicosia (A)
(A) Enosis Neon Paralimni	3 - 1	Digenis Akritas Morphou (A)
(A) Nea Salamis Famagusta	6 - 1	Faros Acropoleos (C)
(B) Chalkanoras Idaliou	4 - 0	Orfeas Nicosia (B)

== Second round ==
Team 1	Result	Team 2
(A) Alki Larnaca	2 - 1	Apollon Limassol (A)
(A) APOEL	2 - 1	Evagoras Paphos (A)
(B) APOP Paphos	1 - 1, 2 - 3	Aris Limassol (A)
(A) EPA Larnaca	4 - 0	Othellos Athienou (B)
(A) AC Omonia	3 - 0	Chalkanoras Idaliou (B)
(A) Enosis Neon Paralimni	2 - 1	ASIL Lysi (A)
(A) Pezoporikos Larnaca	1 - 0	Anorthosis Famagusta (A)
(A) Nea Salamis Famagusta	4 - 1	Iraklis Gerolakkou (B)

== Quarter-finals ==
Team 1	Result	Team 2
(A) Alki Larnaca	2 - 0	Aris Limassol (A)
(A) APOEL	3 - 0	EPA Larnaca (A)
(A) AC Omonia	2 - 0	Enosis Neon Paralimni (A)
(A) Pezoporikos Larnaca	4 - 1	Nea Salamis Famagusta (A)

== Semi-finals ==
Team 1	Result	Team 2
(A) Alki Larnaca	2 - 0	Pezoporikos Larnaca (A)
(A) APOEL	1 - 0	AC Omonia (A)

== Final ==
27 June 1976

APOEL	6–0	Alki Larnaca
Antros Miamiliotis 17'; Nikos Kritikos 31'; Nikos Kritikos 59'; Markos Markou 75'; Markos Markou 77'; Leonidas Leonidou 79'

Tsirio Stadium, Limassol

Cypriot Cup 1975–76 Winners
APOEL
9th title

== Sources ==
- "1975/76 Cyprus Cup". Rec.Sport.Soccer Statistics Foundation. 2017-08-24.

== Bibliography ==
- Gavreilides, Michalis; Papamoiseos, Stelios (2001). Ένας αιώνας Κυπριακό ποδόσφαιρο [One century Cypriot football] (in Greek). Nicosia: The writer. pp. 98–99. ISBN 9963-8720-1-8.
- Stephanidis, Giorgos (2003). 40 χρόνια κυπριακές ομάδες στην Ευρώπη [40 years Cypriot teams in Europe] (in Greek). Nicosia: Haravgi. p. 93. ISBN 9963-8841-1-3.

== See also ==
- Cypriot Cup
- 1975–76 Cypriot First Division
