= 1976–77 Cypriot Cup =

Tournament details
- Country: Cyprus
- Dates: 15 December 1976 – 12 June 1977
- Teams: 42

Final positions
- Champions: Olympiakos Nicosia (1st title)
- Runners-up: Alki Larnaca

The 1976–77 Cypriot Cup was the 35th edition of the Cypriot Cup. A total of 42 clubs entered the competition. It began on 15 December 1976 with the preliminary round and concluded on 12 June 1977 with the final which was held at GSP Stadium. Olympiakos Nicosia won their 1st Cypriot Cup trophy after beating Alki Larnaca 2–0 in the final.

== Format ==
In the 1976–77 Cypriot Cup, participated all the teams of the Cypriot First Division, the Cypriot Second Division and the Cypriot Third Division.

The competition consisted of six knock-out rounds. In all rounds each tie was played as a single leg and was held at the home ground of one of the two teams, according to the draw results. Each tie winner was qualifying to the next round. If a match was drawn, extra time was following. If extra time was drawn, there was a replay at the ground of the team who were away for the first game. If the rematch was also drawn, then extra time was following and if the match remained drawn after extra time the winner was decided by penalty shoot-out.

The cup winner secured a place in the 1977–78 European Cup Winners' Cup.

== Preliminary round ==
In the preliminary round participated 8 teams of 1976–77 Cypriot First Division, 7 teams of 1976–77 Cypriot Second Division and 5 teams of 1976–77 Cypriot Third Division. The teams of each division that participated in the preliminary round were decided by drawing. Then, the 8 teams of first division and 2 teams of the second division were the first group and the rest 5 teams of second division and the five teams of third division were the second group. Each team from the first group was drawn with a team of the second group.

Team 1	Result	Team 2
(A) AEL Limassol	11 - 0	Doxa Katokopias (C)
(A) ASIL Lysi	3 - 4	Adonis Idaliou (C)
(A) Digenis Akritas Morphou	5 - 0	Achilleas Kaimakli (C)
(B) Ermis Aradippou	4 - 2	AEK Ammochostos (C)
(B) Iraklis Gerolakkou	1 - 2	EPA Larnaca (A)
(C) AEK Kythreas	0 - 7	Alki Larnaca (A)
(B) Neos Aionas Trikomou	2 - 6	Evagoras Paphos (A)
(B) Othellos Athienou	0 - 1	Enosis Neon Paralimni (A)
(B) Orfeas Nicosia	0 - 1	Keravnos Strovolou (B)
(B) PAEEK	0 - 8	Pezoporikos Larnaca (A)

== First round ==
8 clubs from the 1976–77 Cypriot First Division, 7 clubs from the 1976–77 Cypriot Second Division and 7 clubs from the 1976–77 Cypriot Third Division were added.

Team 1	Result	Team 2
(C) Adonis Idaliou	2 - 1	Ermis Aradippou (B)
(A) AEL Limassol	0 - 3	Enosis Neon Paralimni (A)
(A) Alki Larnaca	3 - 0	Akritas Chlorakas (C)
(A) APOEL	6 - 0	Faros Acropoleos (C)
(A) Apollon Limassol	13 - 1	ASOB Vatili (C)
(B) APOP Paphos	2 - 0	Parthenon Zodeia (B)
(B) Omonia Aradippou	1 - 2	Anorthosis Famagusta (A)
(B) Ethnikos Achna	1 - 6	AC Omonia (A)
(A) Digenis Akritas Morphou	1 - 0	Keravnos Strovolou (B)
(C) Ethnikos Asteras Limassol	0 - 6	Evagoras Paphos (A)
(B) ENAD Ayiou Dometiou	1 - 3	Aris Limassol (A)
(A) EPA Larnaca	2 - 1	AEM Morphou (B)
(C) Enosis Neon THOI Lakatamia	4 - 0	Olimpiada Neapolis (C)
(A) Olympiakos Nicosia	5 - 0	Anagennisi Deryneia (C)
(A) Pezoporikos Larnaca	3 - 0	Chalkanoras Idaliou (A)
(A) Nea Salamis Famagusta	2 - 0	Ethnikos Assia (B)

== Second round ==
Team 1	Result	Team 2
(C) Adonis Idaliou	1 - 4	Apollon Limassol (A)
(A) APOEL	2 - 2, 0 - 1	Enosis Neon Paralimni (A)
(A) Aris Limassol	0 - 2	Anorthosis Famagusta (A)
(A) EPA Larnaca	1 - 0	Nea Salamis Famagusta (A)
(A) Evagoras Paphos	0 - 3	Alki Larnaca (A)
(C) Enosis Neon THOI Lakatamia	0 - 1	Digenis Akritas Morphou (A)
(A) AC Omonia	1 - 2	Olympiakos Nicosia (A)
(A) Pezoporikos Larnaca	1 - 0	APOP Paphos (B)

== Quarter-finals ==
Team 1	Result	Team 2
(A) Alki Larnaca	4 - 1	EPA Larnaca (A)
(A) Apollon Limassol	2 - 1	Digenis Akritas Morphou (A)
(A) Enosis Neon Paralimni	1 - 2	Olympiakos Nicosia (A)
(A) Pezoporikos Larnaca	0 - 0, 3 - 1	Anorthosis Famagusta (A)

== Semi-finals ==
Team 1	Result	Team 2
(A) Alki Larnaca	1 - 0	Pezoporikos Larnaca (A)
(A) Olympiakos Nicosia	2 - 0	Apollon Limassol (A)

== Final ==
12 June 1977

Olympiakos Nicosia	2–0	Alki Larnaca
Giorgos Aristeidou 12'; Nikos Kikas 88'

GSP Stadium, Nicosia

Cypriot Cup 1976–77 Winners
Olympiakos Nicosia
1st title

== Sources ==
- "1976/77 Cyprus Cup". Rec.Sport.Soccer Statistics Foundation. 2017-08-24.

== Bibliography ==
- Gavreilides, Michalis; Papamoiseos, Stelios (2001). Ένας αιώνας Κυπριακό ποδόσφαιρο [One century Cypriot football] (in Greek). Nicosia: The writer. pp. 100–101. ISBN 9963-8720-1-8.
- Stephanidis, Giorgos (2003). 40 χρόνια κυπριακές ομάδες στην Ευρώπη [40 years Cypriot teams in Europe] (in Greek). Nicosia: Haravgi. p. 102. ISBN 9963-8841-1-3.

== See also ==
- Cypriot Cup
- 1976–77 Cypriot First Division
