= 1977–78 Cypriot Second Division =

Cypriot Second Division
- Season: 1977–78
- Champions: Omonia Aradippou (1st title)
- Promoted: Omonia Aradippou
- Relegated: Orfeas Nicosia

The 1977–78 Cypriot Second Division was the 23rd season of the Cypriot second-level football league. Omonia Aradippou won their 1st title.

== Format ==
Fourteen teams participated in the 1977–78 Cypriot Second Division. All teams played against each other twice, once at their home and once away. The team with the most points at the end of the season crowned champions. The first team was promoted to 1978–79 Cypriot First Division. The last team was relegated to the 1978–79 Cypriot Third Division.

== Changes from previous season ==
Teams promoted to 1977–78 Cypriot First Division

- APOP Paphos FC

Teams relegated from 1976–77 Cypriot First Division

- ASIL Lysi

Teams promoted from 1976–77 Cypriot Third Division

- Akritas Chlorakas

Teams relegated to 1977–78 Cypriot Third Division

- ENAD Ayiou Dometiou FC

== League standings ==
Pos	Team	Pld	W	D	L	GF	GA	GD	Pts	Promotion or relegation
1	Omonia Aradippou (C, P)	26	19	5	2	67	12	+55	43	Promoted to Cypriot First Division
2	Keravnos Strovolou FC	26	16	6	4	49	25	+24	38	
3	Ermis Aradippou FC	26	9	12	5	32	28	+4	30	
4	Ethnikos Achna FC	26	11	7	8	39	24	+15	29	
5	ASIL Lysi	26	11	7	8	35	37	−2	29	
6	Neos Aionas Trikomou	26	11	6	9	33	35	−2	28	
7	Othellos Athienou FC	26	5	14	7	21	30	−9	24	
8	Iraklis Gerolakkou	26	6	10	10	31	38	−7	22	
9	Akritas Chlorakas	26	6	10	10	26	34	−8	22	
10	PAEEK FC	26	6	9	11	23	29	−6	21	
11	Parthenon Zodeia	26	8	5	13	29	41	−12	21	
12	Ethnikos Assia FC	26	5	10	11	21	30	−9	20	
13	AEM Morphou	26	3	14	9	26	43	−17	20	
14	Orfeas Nicosia (R)	26	6	5	15	27	52	−25	17	Relegated to Cypriot Third Division

Rules for classification: 1) Points, 2) Goal differences, 3) Goal for. Points system: Won=2 points, Drawn=1 point, Lost=0 points.
(C) Champions; (P) Promoted; (R) Relegated

== See also ==
- Cypriot Second Division
- 1977–78 Cypriot First Division
- 1977–78 Cypriot Cup
