= 1971–72 Cypriot Cup =

Tournament details
- Country: Cyprus
- Dates: 15 April 1972 – 12 June 1972
- Teams: 32

Final positions
- Champions: Omonia (2nd title)
- Runners-up: Pezoporikos Larnaca

The 1971–72 Cypriot Cup was the 30th edition of the Cypriot Cup. A total of 32 clubs entered the competition. It began on 15 April 1972 with the first round and concluded on 12 June 1972 with the final which was held at GSP Stadium. Omonia won their 2nd Cypriot Cup trophy after beating Pezoporikos Larnaca 3–1 in the final.

== Format ==
In the 1971–72 Cypriot Cup, participated all the teams of the Cypriot First Division, the Cypriot Second Division and 8 of the 11 teams of the Cypriot Third Division (first eight of the league table; cup took place after the end of the league).

The competition consisted of five knock-out rounds. In all rounds each tie was played as a single leg and was held at the home ground of one of the two teams, according to the draw results. Each tie winner was qualifying to the next round. If a match was drawn, extra time was following. If extra time was drawn, there was a replay at the ground of the team who were away for the first game. If the rematch was also drawn, then extra time was following and if the match remained drawn after extra time the winner was decided by penalty shoot-out.

The cup winner secured a place in the 1972–73 European Cup Winners' Cup.

== First round ==
At the first round the Cypriot First Division teams were not drawn together.

Team 1	Result	Team 2
(A) AEL Limassol	7 - 1	Orfeas Nicosia (B)
(A) Anorthosis Famagusta	7 - 1	AEK Kythreas (C)
(A) Apollon Limassol	1 - 0	Chalkanoras Idaliou (B)
(C) Apollon Athienou	0 - 5	Pezoporikos Larnaca (A)
(A) APOP Paphos	3 - 0	Ethnikos Assia (C)
(C) Omonia Aradippou	2 - 0	ENAD Ayiou Dometiou (B)
(B) Aris Limassol	2 - 2, 1 - 3	Alki Larnaca (A)
(B) ASIL Lysi	3 - 2	AEM Morphou (B)
(C) Achilleas Kaimakli	1 - 3	Digenis Akritas Morphou (A)
(B) Ethnikos Achna	5 - 2	Othellos Athienou (B)
(C) Ethnikos Asteras Limassol	0 - 3	Keravnos Strovolou (B)
(A) EPA Larnaca	2 - 1	AEK Ammochostos (B)
(B) Evagoras Paphos	0 - 1	Nea Salamis Famagusta (A)
(A) AC Omonia	6 - 0	Neos Aionas Trikomou (C)
(B) PAEEK	0 - 2	Enosis Neon Paralimni (A)
(C) Parthenon Zodeia	0 - 4	APOEL (A)

== Second round ==
Team 1	Result	Team 2
(A) Alki Larnaca	0 - 0, 0 - 0 (6 - 4 pen.)	APOP Paphos (A)
(A) Anorthosis Famagusta	0 - 2	Enosis Neon Paralimni (A)
(A) APOEL	3 - 1	Apollon Limassol (A)
(A) Digenis Akritas Morphou	1 - 1, 0 - 0 (4 - 3 pen.)	Nea Salamis Famagusta (A)
(A) EPA Larnaca	3 - 0	Omonia Aradippou (C)
(B) Keravnos Strovolou	0 - 3	Ethnikos Achna (B)
(A) AC Omonia	3 - 1	ASIL Lysi (B)
(A) Pezoporikos Larnaca	0 - 0, 0 - 0 (4 - 3 pen.)	AEL Limassol (A)

== Quarter-finals ==
Team 1	Result	Team 2
(A) Alki Larnaca	0 - 1	AC Omonia (A)
(A) APOEL	1 - 0	Digenis Akritas Morphou (A)
(A) EPA Larnaca	1 - 0	Enosis Neon Paralimni (A)
(A) Pezoporikos Larnaca	4 - 1	Ethnikos Achna (B)

== Semi-finals ==
Team 1	Result	Team 2
(A) AC Omonia	4 - 2	EPA Larnaca (A)
(A) Pezoporikos Larnaca	3 - 2	APOEL (A)

== Final ==
12 June 1972

Omonia	3–1 (a.e.t.)	Pezoporikos
Stelios Rotsides 65'; Andreas Kanaris 93'; Kokos Antoniou 119'		79' Menelaos Asprou "Melis"

GSP Stadium, Nicosia

Cypriot Cup 1971–72 Winners
Omonia
2nd title

== Sources ==
- "1971/72 Cyprus Cup". Rec.Sport.Soccer Statistics Foundation. 2017-08-24.

== Bibliography ==
- Gavreilides, Michalis; Papamoiseos, Stelios (2001). Ένας αιώνας Κυπριακό ποδόσφαιρο [One century Cypriot football] (in Greek). Nicosia: The writer. pp. 90–91. ISBN 9963-8720-1-8.
- Stephanidis, Giorgos (2003). 40 χρόνια κυπριακές ομάδες στην Ευρώπη [40 years Cypriot teams in Europe] (in Greek). Nicosia: Haravgi. p. 68. ISBN 9963-8841-1-3.

== See also ==
- Cypriot Cup
- 1971–72 Cypriot First Division
