= 1976–77 Cypriot Second Division =

Cypriot Second Division
- Season: 1976–77
- Champions: APOP Paphos FC (5th title)
- Promoted: APOP Paphos FC
- Relegated: ENAD Ayiou Dometiou FC

The 1976–77 Cypriot Second Division was the 22nd season of the Cypriot second-level football league. APOP Paphos FC won their 5th title.

== Format ==
Fourteen teams participated in the 1976–77 Cypriot Second Division. All teams played against each other twice, once at their home and once away. The team with the most points at the end of the season crowned champions. The first team was promoted to 1977–78 Cypriot First Division. The last team was relegated to the 1977–78 Cypriot Third Division.

== Changes from previous season ==
Teams promoted to 1976–77 Cypriot First Division

- Chalkanoras Idaliou

Teams promoted from 1975–76 Cypriot Third Division

- Ermis Aradippou FC

Teams that reactive after Turkish invasion

- Neos Aionas Trikomou

== League standings ==
Pos	Team	Pld	W	D	L	GF	GA	GD	Pts	Promotion or relegation
1	APOP Paphos FC (C, P)	26	–	–	–	86	10	+76	47	Promoted to Cypriot First Division
2	Omonia Aradippou	26	–	–	–	61	10	+51	44	
3	Ethnikos Achna FC	26	–	–	–	67	15	+52	42	
4	Ermis Aradippou FC	26	–	–	–	39	24	+15	28	
5	Othellos Athienou FC	26	–	–	–	32	26	+6	28	
6	PAEEK FC	26	–	–	–	34	30	+4	28	
7	Keravnos Strovolou FC	26	–	–	–	42	31	+11	26	
8	Orfeas Nicosia	26	–	–	–	37	51	−14	21	
9	Neos Aionas Trikomou	26	–	–	–	29	51	−22	21	
10	Iraklis Gerolakkou	25	–	–	–	28	52	−24	20	
11	Ethnikos Assia FC	26	–	–	–	29	42	−13	19	
12	AEM Morphou	26	–	–	–	24	69	−45	15	
13	Parthenon Zodeia	26	–	–	–	18	64	−46	13	
14	ENAD Ayiou Dometiou FC (R)	25	–	–	–	15	67	−52	11	Relegated to Cypriot Third Division

Rules for classification: 1) Points, 2) Goal differences, 3) Goal for. Points system: Won=2 points, Drawn=1 point, Lost=0 points.
(C) Champions; (P) Promoted; (R) Relegated

== See also ==
- Cypriot Second Division
- 1976–77 Cypriot First Division
- 1976–77 Cypriot Cup
