= 1975–76 Cypriot Second Division =

Cypriot Second Division
- Season: 1975–76
- Champions: Chalkanoras Idaliou (1st title)
- Promoted: Chalkanoras Idaliou

The 1975–76 Cypriot Second Division was the 21st season of the Cypriot second-level football league. Chalkanoras Idaliou won their 1st title.

== Format ==
Thirteen teams participated in the 1975–76 Cypriot Second Division. All teams played against each other twice, once at their home and once away. The team with the most points at the end of the season crowned champions. The first team was promoted to 1976–77 Cypriot First Division.

== League standings ==
Pos	Team	Pld	W	D	L	GF	GA	GD	Pts	Promotion
1	Chalkanoras Idaliou (C, P)	24	–	–	–	62	11	+51	44	Promoted to Cypriot First Division
2	APOP Paphos FC	24	–	–	–	87	15	+72	41	
3	Omonia Aradippou	24	–	–	–	51	12	+39	37	
4	Othellos Athienou FC	24	–	–	–	50	24	+26	31	
5	Keravnos Strovolou FC	24	–	–	–	44	40	+4	29	
6	Ethnikos Assia FC	24	–	–	–	20	37	−17	22	
7	PAEEK FC	24	–	–	–	32	32	0	21	
8	Orfeas Nicosia	24	–	–	–	30	40	−10	20	
9	Ethnikos Achna FC	24	–	–	–	23	41	−18	18	
10	Iraklis Gerolakkou	24	–	–	–	20	52	−32	15	
11	ENAD Ayiou Dometiou FC	24	–	–	–	17	44	−27	13	
12	Parthenon Zodeia	24	–	–	–	15	52	−37	11	
13	AEM Morphou	24	–	–	–	19	77	−58	10	

Rules for classification: 1) Points, 2) Goal differences, 3) Goal for. Points system: Won=2 points, Drawn=1 point, Lost=0 points.
(C) Champions; (P) Promoted

== See also ==
- Cypriot Second Division
- 1975–76 Cypriot First Division
- 1975–76 Cypriot Cup
