= 1978–79 Cypriot Cup =

Tournament details
- Country: Cyprus
- Dates: 10 January 1979 – 24 June 1979
- Teams: 40

Final positions
- Champions: APOEL (11th title)
- Runners-up: AEL Limassol

The 1978–79 Cypriot Cup was the 37th edition of the Cypriot Cup. A total of 40 clubs entered the competition. It began on 10 January 1979 with the preliminary round and concluded on 24 June 1979 with the final which was held at Makario Stadium. APOEL won their 11th Cypriot Cup trophy after beating AEL Limassol 1–0 in the final.

== Format ==
In the 1978–79 Cypriot Cup, participated all the teams of the Cypriot First Division, the Cypriot Second Division and the Cypriot Third Division.

The competition consisted of six knock-out rounds. In all rounds each tie was played as a single leg and was held at the home ground of one of the two teams, according to the draw results. Each tie winner was qualifying to the next round. If a match was drawn, extra time was following. If extra time was drawn, there was a replay at the ground of the team who were away for the first game. If the rematch was also drawn, then extra time was following and if the match remained drawn after extra time the winner was decided by penalty shoot-out.

The cup winner secured a place in the 1979–80 European Cup Winners' Cup.

== Preliminary round ==
In the first preliminary draw, participated all the 10 teams of the Cypriot Third Division and 6 of the 14 teams of the Cypriot Second Division (last six of the league table of each group at the day of the draw).

Team 1	Result	Team 2
(C) AEK Ammochostos	1 - 2	Olimpiada Neapolis (C)
(B) ASIL Lysi	4 - 0	ENAD Ayiou Dometiou (C)
(C) Doxa Katokopias	1 - 3	Anagennisi Deryneia (C)
(B) Iraklis Gerolakkou	1 - 5	AEM Morphou (B)
(C) Enosis Neon THOI Lakatamia	2 - 0	Achilleas Kaimakli (C)
(C) AEK Kythreas	3 - 1	Faros Acropoleos (C)
(C) Orfeas Nicosia	3 - 0	PAEEK (B)
(B) Parthenon Zodeia	2 - 1	Ethnikos Assia (B)

== First round ==
16 clubs from the Cypriot First Division and the rest clubs from the Cypriot Second Division met the winners of the preliminary round ties:

Team 1	Result	Team 2
(A) AEL Limassol	3 - 1	Omonia Aradippou (A)
(B) AEM Morphou	0 - 2	Ethnikos Achna (B)
(A) Alki Larnaca	3 - 2	Ermis Aradippou (B)
(A) Anorthosis Famagusta	10 - 1	Enosis Neon THOI Lakatamia (C)
(A) Apollon Limassol	2 - 0	AEK Kythreas (C)
(A) APOP Paphos	2 - 0	Parthenon Zodeia (B)
(B) ASIL Lysi	3 - 0	Digenis Akritas Morphou (A)
(C) Anagennisi Deryneia	0 - 4	Olympiakos Nicosia (A)
(A) EPA Larnaca	5 - 0	Akritas Chlorakas (B)
(B) Keravnos Strovolou	1 - 5	Aris Limassol (A)
(B) Neos Aionas Trikomou	2 - 1	Adonis Idaliou (B)
(B) Othellos Athienou	0 - 6	AC Omonia (A)
(C) Orfeas Nicosia	1 - 2	Pezoporikos Larnaca (A)
(A) Enosis Neon Paralimni	10 - 0	Olimpiada Neapolis (C)
(A) Nea Salamis Famagusta	5 - 0	Evagoras Paphos (A)
(B) Chalkanoras Idaliou	1 - 2	APOEL (A)

== Second round ==
Team 1	Result	Team 2
(A) Alki Larnaca	0 - 1	Aris Limassol (A)
(A) Anorthosis Famagusta	2 - 1	APOP Paphos (A)
(A) APOEL	4 - 0	Nea Salamis Famagusta (A)
(A) Apollon Limassol	3 - 1	ASIL Lysi (B)
(B) Ethnikos Achna	0 - 0, 1 - 4	AC Omonia (A)
(A) EPA Larnaca	2 - 4	Enosis Neon Paralimni (A)
(B) Neos Aionas Trikomou	1 - 2	Olympiakos Nicosia (A)
(A) Pezoporikos Larnaca	0 - 2	AEL Limassol (A)

== Quarter-finals ==
Team 1	Result	Team 2
(A) AEL Limassol	1 - 1, 3 - 0	Apollon Limassol (A)
(A) Aris Limassol	3 - 2	AC Omonia (A)
(A) Olympiakos Nicosia	0 - 3	Anorthosis Famagusta (A)
(A) Enosis Neon Paralimni	0 - 1	APOEL (A)

== Semi-finals ==
Team 1	Result	Team 2
(A) AEL Limassol	2 - 0	Aris Limassol (A)
(A) APOEL	1 - 0	Anorthosis Famagusta (A)

== Final ==
24 June 1979

APOEL	1–0 (a.e.t.)	AEL Limassol
Koullis Pantziaras 103'

Makario Stadium, Nicosia

Cypriot Cup 1978–79 Winners
APOEL
11th title

== Sources ==
- "1978/79 Cyprus Cup". Rec.Sport.Soccer Statistics Foundation. 2017-08-24.

== Bibliography ==
- Gavreilides, Michalis; Papamoiseos, Stelios (2001). Ένας αιώνας Κυπριακό ποδόσφαιρο [One century Cypriot football] (in Greek). Nicosia: The writer. pp. 104–105. ISBN 9963-8720-1-8.
- Stephanidis, Giorgos (2003). 40 χρόνια κυπριακές ομάδες στην Ευρώπη [40 years Cypriot teams in Europe] (in Greek). Nicosia: Haravgi. p. 117. ISBN 9963-8841-1-3.

== See also ==
- Cypriot Cup
- 1978–79 Cypriot First Division
