= 1978–79 Cypriot Second Division =

Cypriot Second Division
- Season: 1978–79
- Champions: Keravnos Strovolou FC (1st title)
- Promoted: Keravnos Strovolou FC
- Relegated: Iraklis Gerolakkou; Parthenon Zodeia

The 1978–79 Cypriot Second Division was the 24th season of the Cypriot second-level football league. Keravnos Strovolou FC won their 1st title.

== Format ==
Fourteen teams participated in the 1978–79 Cypriot Second Division. All teams played against each other twice, once at their home and once away. The team with the most points at the end of the season crowned champions. The first team was promoted to 1979–80 Cypriot First Division. The last two teams were relegated to the 1979–80 Cypriot Third Division.

== Changes from previous season ==
Teams promoted to 1978–79 Cypriot First Division

- Omonia Aradippou

Teams relegated from 1977–78 Cypriot First Division

- Chalkanoras Idaliou

Teams promoted from 1977–78 Cypriot Third Division

- Adonis Idaliou

Teams relegated to 1978–79 Cypriot Third Division

- Orfeas Nicosia

== League standings ==
Pos	Team	Pld	W	D	L	GF	GA	GD	Pts	Promotion or relegation
1	Keravnos Strovolou FC (C, P)	26	–	–	–	63	18	+45	42	Promoted to Cypriot First Division
2	Chalkanoras Idaliou	26	–	–	–	62	17	+45	40	
3	Adonis Idaliou	26	–	–	–	40	21	+19	37	
4	Ethnikos Achna FC	26	–	–	–	59	27	+32	34	
5	Ermis Aradippou FC	26	–	–	–	47	37	+10	28	
6	Akritas Chlorakas	26	–	–	–	40	39	+1	27	
7	Othellos Athienou FC	26	–	–	–	37	40	−3	25	
8	AEM Morphou	26	–	–	–	40	53	−13	25	
9	PAEEK FC	26	–	–	–	38	42	−4	21	
10	Neos Aionas Trikomou	26	–	–	–	25	38	−13	21	
11	Ethnikos Assia FC	26	–	–	–	21	34	−13	20	
12	ASIL Lysi	26	–	–	–	34	52	−18	18	
13	Iraklis Gerolakkou (R)	26	–	–	–	20	59	−39	13	Relegated to Cypriot Third Division
14	Parthenon Zodeia (R)	26	–	–	–	24	74	−50	13	Relegated to Cypriot Third Division

Rules for classification: 1) Points, 2) Goal differences, 3) Goal for. Points system: Won=2 points, Drawn=1 point, Lost=0 points.
(C) Champions; (P) Promoted; (R) Relegated

== See also ==
- Cypriot Second Division
- 1978–79 Cypriot First Division
- 1978–79 Cypriot Cup
