= Nikos Pantziaras =

Cypriot footballer (born 1954)

Personal information
- Date of birth: January 7, 1954 (age 72)
- Position: Midfielder

Senior career*
Years	Team	Apps	(Gls)
1973–1987	APOEL		

International career
1974–1987	Cyprus	48	(1)
- * Club domestic league appearances and goals

Nikos Pantziaras (Greek: Νίκος Παντζιαράς; born January 7, 1954) is a retired Cypriot football midfielder.

== Personal ==
Nikos is the brother of Koulis and Giorgos, and the uncle of Andreas.
