= 1972–73 Cypriot Second Division =

Cypriot Second Division
- Season: 1972–73
- Champions: APOP Paphos FC (3rd title)
- Promoted: APOP Paphos FC
- Relegated: AEK Ammochostos

The 1972–73 Cypriot Second Division was the 18th season of the Cypriot second-level football league. APOP Paphos FC won their 3rd title.

== Format ==
Fourteen teams participated in the 1972–73 Cypriot Second Division. All teams played against each other twice, once at their home and once away. The team with the most points at the end of the season crowned champions. The first team was promoted to 1973–74 Cypriot First Division. The last team was relegated to the 1973–74 Cypriot Third Division.

== Changes from previous season ==
Teams promoted to 1972–73 Cypriot First Division

- Evagoras Paphos
- ASIL Lysi
- Aris Limassol FC

Teams relegated from 1971–72 Cypriot First Division

- APOP Paphos FC

Teams promoted from 1971–72 Cypriot Third Division

- Ethnikos Asteras Limassol
- Ethnikos Assia FC
- Omonia Aradippou
- Parthenon Zodeia

== League standings ==
Pos	Team	Pld	W	D	L	GF	GA	GD	Pts	Promotion or relegation
1	APOP Paphos FC (C, P)	26	20	3	3	60	16	+44	43	Promoted to Cypriot First Division
2	AEM Morphou	26	15	9	2	46	18	+28	39	
3	Chalkanoras Idaliou	26	14	7	5	40	25	+15	35	
4	Othellos Athienou FC	26	14	6	6	49	25	+24	34	
5	Ethnikos Achna FC	26	13	5	8	51	33	+18	31	
6	Ethnikos Assia FC	26	12	6	8	34	33	+1	30	
7	Orfeas Nicosia	26	8	5	13	25	35	−10	21	
8	Ethnikos Asteras Limassol	26	8	5	13	26	49	−23	21	
9	Omonia Aradippou	26	5	10	11	21	29	−8	20	
10	Keravnos Strovolou FC	26	7	6	13	31	44	−13	20	
11	Parthenon Zodeia	26	5	10	11	22	34	−12	20	
12	PAEEK FC	26	7	6	13	25	40	−15	20	
13	ENAD Ayiou Dometiou FC	26	6	5	15	23	40	−17	17	
14	AEK Ammochostos (R)	26	4	5	17	21	53	−32	13	Relegated to Cypriot Third Division

Rules for classification: 1) Points, 2) Goal differences, 3) Goal for. Points system: Won=2 points, Drawn=1 point, Lost=0 points.
(C) Champions; (P) Promoted; (R) Relegated

== See also ==
- Cypriot Second Division
- 1972–73 Cypriot First Division
- 1972–73 Cypriot Cup
