= 1971–72 Cypriot Second Division =

Cypriot Second Division
- Season: 1971–72
- Champions: Evagoras Paphos (2nd title)
- Promoted: Evagoras Paphos
- Relegated: Evagoras Paphos; ASIL Lysi; Aris Limassol FC

The 1971–72 Cypriot Second Division was the 17th season of the Cypriot second-level football league. Evagoras Paphos won their 2nd title.

== Format ==
Fourteen teams participated in the 1971–72 Cypriot Second Division. All teams played against each other twice, once at their home and once away. The team with the most points at the end of the season crowned champions. The first three teams were promoted to 1972–73 Cypriot First Division.

== Changes from previous season ==
Teams promoted to 1971–72 Cypriot First Division

- APOP Paphos FC

Teams relegated to 1971–72 Cypriot Third Division

- LALL Lysi

Teams relegated from 1970–71 Cypriot First Division

- ASIL Lysi

Teams promoted from 1970–71 Cypriot Third Division

- Keravnos Strovolou FC
- Ethnikos Achna FC

Moreover, Enosis Panelliniou-Antaeus Limassol (EPAL) absorbed from Aris Limassol FC.

== League standings ==
Pos	Team	Pld	W	D	L	GF	GA	GD	Pts	Promotion
1	Evagoras Paphos (C, P)	22	14	7	1	50	21	+29	35	Promoted to Cypriot First Division
2	ASIL Lysi (P)	22	10	9	3	48	24	+24	29	Promoted to Cypriot First Division
3	Aris Limassol FC (P)	22	12	5	5	49	26	+23	29	Promoted to Cypriot First Division
4	AEM Morphou	21	11	4	6	40	32	+8	26	
5	Chalkanoras Idaliou	22	9	7	6	36	27	+9	25	
6	Ethnikos Achna FC	22	9	7	6	35	31	+4	25	
7	Keravnos Strovolou FC	22	7	5	10	25	29	−4	19	
8	Orfeas Nicosia	22	7	5	10	26	43	−17	19	
9	Othellos Athienou FC	22	7	3	12	27	32	−5	17	
10	PAEEK FC	22	2	10	10	24	40	−16	14	
11	AEK Ammochostos	22	5	3	14	25	38	−13	13	
12	ENAD Ayiou Dometiou FC	22	4	5	13	22	50	−28	13	

Rules for classification: 1) Points, 2) Goal differences, 3) Goal for. Points system: Won=2 points, Drawn=1 point, Lost=0 points.
(C) Champions; (P) Promoted

== See also ==
- Cypriot Second Division
- 1971–72 Cypriot First Division
- 1971–72 Cypriot Cup
