= 1970–71 Cypriot Third Division =

Cypriot Third Division
- Season: 1970–71
- Champions: Keravnos Strovolou FC (1st title)
- Promoted: Keravnos Strovolou FC; Ethnikos Achna FC

The 1970–71 Cypriot Third Division was the first season of the Cypriot third-level football league. Keravnos Strovolou FC won their 1st title.

== Format ==
Twelve teams participated in the 1970–71 Cypriot Third Division. All teams played against each other twice, once at their home and once away. The team with the most points at the end of the season crowned champions. The first two teams were promoted to 1971–72 Cypriot Second Division.

=== Point system ===
Teams received two points for a win, one point for a draw and zero points for a loss.

== League standings ==
Pos	Team	Pld	W	D	L	GF	GA	GD	Pts	Promotion
1	Keravnos Strovolou FC	22	14	5	3	46	13	+33	33	Promoted to 1971–72 Cypriot Second Division
2	Ethnikos Achna FC	22	14	4	4	51	13	+38	32	Promoted to 1971–72 Cypriot Second Division
3	Ethnikos Assia FC	22	13	3	6	30	16	+14	29	
4	Omonia Aradippou	22	11	4	7	32	26	+6	26	
5	AEK Kythreas	22	10	5	7	34	32	+2	25	
6	Apollon Athienou	22	10	4	8	39	28	+11	24	
7	Achilleas Kaimakli FC	22	8	3	11	27	33	−6	19	
8	Anagennisi Larnacas	22	7	5	10	33	39	−6	19	
9	Neos Aionas Trikomou	22	6	5	11	25	42	−17	17	
10	Parthenon Zodeia	22	7	2	13	27	46	−19	16	
11	Ethnikos Asteras Limassol	22	7	1	14	29	54	−25	15	
12	ENAZ Agia Zoni Limassol	22	1	7	14	19	50	−31	9	

Rules for classification: 1) Points, 2) Goal differences, 3) Goal for

== Sources ==
- "Τελική βαθμολογία της Γ΄ κατηγορίας". Philathlos (in Greek). 1971-05-24. p. 4.

== See also ==
- Cypriot Third Division
- 1970–71 Cypriot First Division
- 1970–71 Cypriot Cup
