= 1975–76 Cypriot Third Division =

Cypriot Third Division
- Season: 1975–76
- Champions: Ermis Aradippou FC (1st title)
- Promoted: Ermis Aradippou FC

The 1975–76 Cypriot Third Division was the fifth season of the Cypriot third-level football league. Ermis Aradippou FC won their 1st title.

== Format ==
Eight teams participated in the 1975–76 Cypriot Third Division. All teams played against each other twice, once at their home and once away. The team with the most points at the end of the season crowned champions. The first team was promoted to 1976–77 Cypriot Second Division.

=== Point system ===
Teams received two points for a win, one point for a draw and zero points for a loss.

== League standings ==
Pos	Team	Pld	W	D	L	GF	GA	GD	Pts	Promotion
1	Ermis Aradippou FC	14	–	–	–	46	4	+42	25	Promoted to 1976–77 Cypriot Second Division
2	Anagennisi Deryneia FC	14	–	–	–	46	16	+30	22	
3	Akritas Chlorakas	14	–	–	–	43	12	+31	21	
4	Achilleas Kaimakli FC	14	–	–	–	33	34	−1	13	
5	Ethnikos Asteras Limassol	14	–	–	–	20	35	−15	13	
6	Doxa Katokopias FC	14	–	–	–	19	42	−23	8	
7	AEK Kythreas	14	–	–	–	14	44	−30	8	
8	Faros Acropoleos	14	–	–	–	16	50	−34	2	

Rules for classification: 1) Points, 2) Goal differences, 3) Goal for

== Sources ==
- "Ο Ερμής Αραδίππου άξιος πρωταθλητής". Haravgi (in Greek). 13 January 1976. p. 6.
- "Ο Ερμής ανεκηρύχθη πανηγυρικά πρώτος". Tharros (in Greek). 12 January 1976. p. 6.

== See also ==
- Cypriot Third Division
- 1975–76 Cypriot First Division
- 1975–76 Cypriot Cup
