= 1976–77 Cypriot Third Division =

Cypriot Third Division
- Season: 1976–77
- Champions: Akritas Chlorakas (1st title)
- Promoted: Akritas Chlorakas
- Relegated: ASOB Vatili

The 1976–77 Cypriot Third Division was the sixth season of the Cypriot third-level football league. Akritas Chlorakas won their 1st title.

== Format ==
Twelve teams participated in the 1976–77 Cypriot Third Division. All teams played against each other twice, once at their home and once away. The team with the most points at the end of the season crowned champions. The first team was promoted to 1977–78 Cypriot Second Division. The last team was relegated to regional leagues.

=== Point system ===
Teams received two points for a win, one point for a draw and zero points for a loss.

== League standings ==
Pos	Team	Pld	W	D	L	GF	GA	GD	Pts	Promotion or relegation
1	Akritas Chlorakas	22	19	2	1	66	15	+51	40	Promoted to 1977–78 Cypriot Second Division
2	ENTHOI Lakatamia FC	22	17	3	2	64	16	+48	37	
3	Adonis Idaliou	22	14	5	3	60	25	+35	33	
4	Anagennisi Deryneia FC	22	15	3	4	54	25	+29	33	
5	AEK Kythreas	22	10	7	5	44	27	+17	27	
6	Faros Acropoleos	22	8	6	8	36	35	+1	22	
7	Ethnikos Asteras Limassol	22	6	4	12	31	33	−2	16	
8	Doxa Katokopias FC	22	5	6	11	27	45	−18	16	
9	Achilleas Kaimakli FC	22	7	0	15	33	47	−14	14	
10	AEK Ammochostos	22	4	6	12	29	49	−20	14	
11	Olimpiada Neapolis FC	22	3	5	14	28	59	−31	11	
12	ASOB Vatili	22	0	1	21	12	108	−96	1	Relegated to regional leagues

Rules for classification: 1) Points, 2) Goal differences, 3) Goal for

== Sources ==
- "Τελική βαθμολογία της Γ΄ κατηγορίας". Haravgi (in Greek). 1977-04-14. p. 2.
- Cyprus Football Association (February 2016). "Το περιοδικό της ΚΟΠ" (PDF) (in Greek) (19). Λευκωσία: Cyprus Football Association: 68–70. Archived from the original (PDF) on 2017-02-22.

== See also ==
- Cypriot Third Division
- 1976–77 Cypriot First Division
- 1976–77 Cypriot Cup
