= 1971–72 Cypriot Third Division =

Cypriot Third Division
- Season: 1971–72
- Champions: Ethnikos Asteras Limassol (1st title)
- Promoted: Ethnikos Asteras Limassol; Ethnikos Assia FC; Omonia Aradippou; Parthenon Zodeia

The 1971–72 Cypriot Third Division was the second season of the Cypriot third-level football league. Ethnikos Asteras Limassol won their 1st title.

== Format ==
Eleven teams participated in the 1971–72 Cypriot Third Division. All teams played against each other twice, once at their home and once away. The team with the most points at the end of the season crowned champions. The first four teams were promoted to 1972–73 Cypriot Second Division.

=== Point system ===
Teams received two points for a win, one point for a draw and zero points for a loss.

== League standings ==
Pos	Team	Pld	W	D	L	GF	GA	GD	Pts	Promotion
1	Ethnikos Asteras Limassol	20	13	5	2	42	12	+30	31	Promoted to 1972–73 Cypriot Second Division
2	Ethnikos Assia FC	20	12	6	2	40	9	+31	30	Promoted to 1972–73 Cypriot Second Division
3	Omonia Aradippou	20	8	6	6	34	25	+9	22	Promoted to 1972–73 Cypriot Second Division
4	Parthenon Zodeia	20	8	6	6	30	24	+6	22	Promoted to 1972–73 Cypriot Second Division
5	Apollon Athienou	20	9	3	8	31	28	+3	21	
6	Achilleas Kaimakli FC	20	5	9	6	28	28	0	19	
7	Neos Aionas Trikomou	20	6	6	8	22	32	−10	18	
8	AEK Kythreas	20	5	7	8	22	30	−8	17	
9	ENAZ Agia Zoni Limassol	20	6	4	10	34	36	−2	16	
10	Anagennisi Larnacas	20	4	5	11	18	50	−32	13	
11	LALL Lysi	20	5	2	13	21	47	−26	12	

Rules for classification: 1) Points, 2) Goal differences, 3) Goal for

== Sources ==
- "Το πρωτάθλημα Β' Κατηγορίας το 1971". www.sigmalive.com (in Greek). Archived from the original on 2016-08-11.
- "Η ΤΕΛΙΚΗ ΚΑΤΑΤΑΞΗ". Haravgi (in Greek). 1972-03-21. p. 4.

== See also ==
- Cypriot Third Division
- 1971–72 Cypriot First Division
- 1971–72 Cypriot Cup
