= Markou =

Markou is a surname. Notable people with the surname include:

- Costas Markou (born 1988), Cypriot footballer
- Eleni Markou (born 1995), Greek footballer
- Georgios Markou (1690–1770), Greek painter
- Marcus Markou, British film maker, playwright, and internet entrepreneur
- Markos Markou (born 1949), Cypriot footballer

== See also ==
- Tasos Markou Stadium, a stadium in Cyprus
