= Panos Markovic =

Greek footballer and coach

Panos Marković
Personal information
- Full name: Panagiotis Marković
- Date of birth: 5 May 1925
- Place of birth: Drama, Greece
- Date of death: 17 August 2012 (aged 87)
- Place of death: Athens, Greece
- Position: Midfielder

Youth career
- –1945: PAOK

Senior career*
Years	Team	Apps	(Gls)
1945–1951	PAOK	?	(?)

Managerial career
- 1952–1955: Doxa Drama
- 1955–1957: Apollon Kalamarias
- 1957–1959: Thermaikos
- 1959–1960: Iraklis
- 1960–1961: Megas Alexandros Katerini
- 1961–1962: Iraklis
- 1962–1963: Apollon Kalamaria
- 1963: Doxa Drama
- 1965–1966: Edessaikos
- 1966–1967: Greece
- 1967–1969: Ethnikos Piraeus
- 1969–1970: Aias Salamina
- 1970–1971: Olympiacos Chalkida
- 1971–1972: Proodeftiki
- 1972–1975: APOEL
- 1976–1977: Panionios
- 1977–1978: Pierikos
- 1978–1979: Panionios
- 1979–1980: Panachaiki
- 1980–1981: Doxa Drama
- 1981–1983: Panionios
- 1983–1985: APOEL
- 1985–1986: Panachaiki
- 1986–1987: Doxa Drama
- 1987–1988: Panachaiki
- 1990: Doxa Drama (caretaker)
- 1990–1992: Olympiakos Nicosia
- 2004: APOEL (caretaker)
- * Club domestic league appearances and goals

Panos Marković (alternate spelling Panos Markovits) (Greek: Πάνος Μάρκοβιτς; 5 May 1925 – 17 August 2012) was a Greek football coach and player.

== Career ==
He was born in Drama, Macedonia (Greece) in 1925 of Serbian descent, but grew up in Thessaloniki. He played football for PAOK from 1945 to 1951, being part of the PAOK squads that won the Macedonia Football Clubs Association in 1948 and 1950 and reached the Greek Football Cup final in 1951. He then transitioned from player to coach at the young age of 26.

Ηe was notable as the first manager in Greece to have held a diploma and calling himself a "manager", taking credit for his team's performances long before Helenio Herrera did the same thing in the 1960s and popularised it globally. He was called "Library" because of his endless knowledge about the game of football and he is credited with creating the great Doxa Drama squad of the 1950s, along with his probably most famous honour, winning the Greek Football Cup with Panionios, the oldest Greek club in the world in 1979 and ending an 89-year drought since the club's formation. He managed 16 different clubs during his 40-year long managerial career and is held in high regard by Panionios fans, in spite of some of the ultras insulting him after the famous 1979 win, which led to his acrimonious resignation. He also had many spells at APOEL in Cyprus, which translated to success, mainly his first one from 1972 to 1975 when he led the team to a Cypriot double in 1973 which meant qualification for the 1973-74 Mainland Greece First Division. That season his APOEL side became the only Cypriot club that played in the Greek First Division that didn't get relegated, but they couldn't renew their stay for 1974-75 because of the Turkish invasion of Cyprus. His second stay from 1983 to 1985 was only met with a Cypriot Cup and Cypriot Super Cup win and his third stay was in a caretaker role in 2004 at the temporary absence of Ivan Jovanović, becoming the 2nd oldest Balkan manager of all time at the age of 79. Aside from "Library", his players called him the "Teacher" and he was held in high regard by most of his players in all the teams he managed.

Another important point of his career was when he managed the Greece national football team together with Lakis Petropoulos for 2 matches in 1966 and 1967. His departure came after the Regime of the Colonels was established in Greece on 21 April 1967 and he was forcibly relinquished of his duties 5 days later.

In 2010, he was given an award by the President of the Republic Demetris Christofias, for his contributions to sport in Cyprus.
