= 1977–78 Cypriot Third Division =

Cypriot Third Division
- Season: 1977–78
- Champions: Adonis Idaliou (1st title)
- Promoted: Adonis Idaliou
- Relegated: Ethnikos Asteras Limassol

The 1977–78 Cypriot Third Division was the seventh season of the Cypriot third-level football league. Adonis Idaliou won their 1st title.

== Format ==
Eleven teams participated in the 1977–78 Cypriot Third Division. All teams played against each other twice, once at their home and once away. The team with the most points at the end of the season crowned champions. The first team was promoted to 1978–79 Cypriot Second Division. The last team was relegated to regional leagues.

=== Point system ===
Teams received two points for a win, one point for a draw and zero points for a loss.

== League standings ==
Pos	Team	Pld	W	D	L	GF	GA	GD	Pts	Promotion or relegation
1	Adonis Idaliou	20	17	3	0	83	10	+73	37	Promoted to 1978–79 Cypriot Second Division
2	ENTHOI Lakatamia FC	20	16	3	1	49	11	+38	35	
3	AEK Kythreas	20	9	6	5	32	22	+10	24	
4	Anagennisi Deryneia FC	20	9	3	8	36	35	+1	21	
5	Doxa Katokopias FC	20	9	3	8	31	41	−10	21	
6	ENAD Ayiou Dometiou FC	20	9	2	9	32	43	−11	20	
7	Olimpiada Neapolis FC	20	6	7	7	30	41	−11	19	
8	AEK Ammochostos	20	8	1	11	32	44	−12	17	
9	Faros Acropoleos	20	6	1	13	30	54	−24	13	
10	Achilleas Kaimakli FC	20	5	3	12	26	40	−14	13	
11	Ethnikos Asteras Limassol	20	0	0	20	0	40	−40	0 (Note: Ethnikos Asteras Limassol withdrew from the league after the start of the season.)	Relegated to regional leagues

Rules for classification: 1) Points, 2) Goal differences, 3) Goal for

== Sources ==
- "Τελική βαθμολογία της Γ΄ κατηγορίας". Philathlos (in Greek). 1978-03-20. p. 2.
- "Ο Άδωνις Ιδαλίου υπεράξιος πρωταθλήτης Γ΄ κατηγορίας". Haravgi (in Greek). 1978-06-15. p. 6.
- Cyprus Football Association (April 2016). "Το περιοδικό της ΚΟΠ" (PDF) (in Greek) (20). Λευκωσία: Cyprus Football Association: 68–71. Archived from the original (PDF) on 2017-02-22.

== See also ==
- Cypriot Third Division
- 1977–78 Cypriot First Division
- 1977–78 Cypriot Cup
