= Nicos Timotheou =

Cypriot footballer (born 1973)

Personal information
- Full name: Nicos Timotheou
- Date of birth: November 4, 1973 (age 52)
- Place of birth: Nicosia, Cyprus
- Height: 1.75 m (5 ft 9 in)
- Position: Defender

Senior career*
Years	Team	Apps	(Gls)
1992–1993	APOEL	4	(0)
1993–1994	Omonia Aradippou	24	(0)
1994–2001	APOEL	114	(5)
2001–2002	Alki	20	(1)
Total		162	(6)

International career
	Cyprus	11	(0)
- * Club domestic league appearances and goals

Nicos Timotheou (born November 4, 1973) is a Cypriot former international football defender.

He played mostly for APOEL, where he stayed for 9 years and won 1 Championship, 5 Cups and 3 Super Cups.

He also played for Omonia Aradippou, Alki Larnaca and had 11 participations with Cyprus national football team.
