= Costas Miamiliotis =

Cypriot footballer (born 1960)

Personal information
- Full name: Costas Miamiliotis
- Date of birth: August 1, 1960 (age 66)
- Place of birth: Nicosia, Cyprus
- Position: Defender

Senior career*
Years	Team	Apps	(Gls)
1977–1989	APOEL	226	(16)
1989–1992	Pezoporikos	61	(1)
1992–1994	APOEL	32	(0)
Total		319	(17)

International career
1981–1990	Cyprus	37	(0)
- * Club domestic league appearances and goals

Costas Miamiliotis (Greek: Κώστας Μιαμηλιώτης; born August 1, 1960) is a Cypriot former international football defender.

He started his career in 1977 from APOEL. In 1989, he moved to Pezoporikos where he totally played for three years. In 1992, he returned to APOEL where he ended his career in 1994. APOEL fans characterized him as legend.
