= Andreas Stavrou (footballer, born 1958) =

Cypriot footballer (born 1958)

Personal information
- Date of birth: 1 March 1958 (age 68)
- Position: Defender

Senior career*
Years	Team	Apps	(Gls)
1977–1980	APOEL		
1980–1986	Doxa Drama		
1986–1991	APOEL		

International career
1986, 1988	Cyprus	5	(0)
- * Club domestic league appearances and goals

Andreas Stavrou (born 1 March 1958) is a retired Cypriot football defender.
