= 1978–79 Cypriot Third Division =

Cypriot Third Division
- Season: 1978–79
- Champions: Orfeas Nicosia (1st title)
- Promoted: Achilleas Kaimakli FC

The 1978–79 Cypriot Third Division was the eighth season of the Cypriot third-level football league. Orfeas Nicosia won their 1st title.

== Format ==
Ten teams participated in the 1978–79 Cypriot Third Division. All teams played against each other twice, once at their home and once away. The team with the most points at the end of the season crowned champions. The first team was promoted to 1979–80 Cypriot Second Division. The last team was relegated to regional leagues.

=== Point system ===
Teams received two points for a win, one point for a draw and zero points for a loss.

== League standings ==
Pos	Team	Pld	W	D	L	GF	GA	GD	Pts	Promotion or relegation
1	Orfeas Nicosia	18	–	–	–	78	12	+66	30	Promoted to 1979–80 Cypriot Second Division
2	ENTHOI Lakatamia FC	18	–	–	–	47	11	+36	30	
3	AEK Kythreas	18	–	–	–	32	16	+16	24	
4	Anagennisi Deryneia FC	18	–	–	–	44	26	+18	24	
5	ENAD Ayiou Dometiou FC	18	–	–	–	20	21	−1	17	
6	Doxa Katokopias FC	18	–	–	–	23	37	−14	17	
7	Olimpiada Neapolis FC	18	–	–	–	24	49	−25	12	
8	AEK Ammochostos	18	–	–	–	28	53	−25	10	
9	Faros Acropoleos	18	–	–	–	25	62	−37	9	
10	Achilleas Kaimakli FC	18	–	–	–	11	45	−34	7	Relegated to regional leagues

Rules for classification: 1) Points, 2) Goal differences, 3) Goal for

== Sources ==
- "Ο ΟΡΦΕΑΣ άξιος πρωταθλητής". Haravgi (in Greek). 1979-02-13. p. 6.
- "ΦΑΡΟΣ-ΑΧΙΛΛΕΑΣ 1–0". Haravgi (in Greek). 1979-02-22. p. 4.
- "Ο Ορφέας πρωταθλητής". Tharros (in Greek). 1979-02-12. p. 2.

== See also ==
- Cypriot Third Division
- 1978–79 Cypriot First Division
- 1978–79 Cypriot Cup
