= Koulis Pantziaras =

Cypriot footballer (born 1958)

Personal information
- Date of birth: April 24, 1958 (age 68)
- Position: Defender

Senior career*
Years	Team	Apps	(Gls)
1978–1991	APOEL		

International career
1982–1987	Cyprus	12	(0)
- * Club domestic league appearances and goals

Kyriakos "Koulis" Pantziaras (Greek: Κυριάκος "Κούλης" Παντζιαράς; born April 24, 1958) is a retired Cypriot football defender.

== Personal ==
His brother is Giorgos and his nephew is Andreas.
