= Andreas Pantziaras =

Cypriot football manager (born 1976)

Personal information
- Date of birth: December 13, 1976 (age 49)

Managerial career
- Years: Team
- 2008: Pyrsos Grevena (caretaker)
- 2009–2010: Pyrsos Grevena
- 2010–2011: Odysseas Anagennisi
- 2011: Platanias
- 2011–2012: Tilikratis
- 2012–2013: Apollon Kalamarias
- 2013–2014: Panserraikos
- 2014–2016: Doxa Dramas
- 2016: Apollon Krya Vrysi
- 2016–2018: Tilikratis
- 2018–2019: Aris Palaiochori
- 2019–2021: Makedonikos
- 2021–2023: Tilikratis
- 2023–2025: Haniotis
- 2025: Apollon Paralimnio
- 2025: Aetos Ofrynio
- 2025–2026: Pierikos

Andreas Pantziaras (Greek: Ανδρέας Παντζιαράς; born December 13, 1976) is a Cypriot football manager. He started his managerial career in 2008 with Pyrsos Grevena F.C., followed by Odysseas Anagennisi F.C., Platanias, Tilikratis F.C., and many others. In 2025, he was named technical director for Apollon Paralimnio

== Personal ==
His father is Giorgos, and his uncle is Koulis.
