= 1971–72 Cypriot First Division =

33rd season of Cypriot First Division

Cypriot First Division
- Season: 1971–72

The 1971–72 Cypriot First Division was the 33rd season of the Cypriot top-level football league.

== Overview ==
It was contested by 12 teams, and AC Omonia won the championship. Olympiakos Nicosia participated in the Greek championship as the previous year's champions. They finished in 18th position.

== League standings ==
Pos	Team	Pld	W	D	L	GF	GA	GD	Pts	Qualification or relegation
1	AC Omonia (C)	22	13	6	3	30	14	+16	32	Qualification for European Cup first round
2	EPA Larnaca FC	22	11	8	3	36	17	+19	30	Qualification for UEFA Cup first round
3	EN Paralimni	22	9	7	6	20	16	+4	25	
4	Anorthosis Famagusta FC	22	6	12	4	22	18	+4	24	
5	Apollon Limassol	22	8	7	7	21	21	0	23	
6	Alki Larnaca FC	22	7	8	7	23	24	−1	22	
7	APOEL F.C.	22	8	5	9	29	23	+6	21	
8	Nea Salamis FC	22	5	10	7	16	22	−6	20	
9	Digenis Akritas Morphou	22	6	8	8	12	20	−8	20	
10	Pezoporikos Larnaca	22	5	9	8	14	18	−4	19	Qualification for Cup Winners' Cup first round
11	AEL Limassol	22	4	7	11	12	28	−16	15	
12	APOP Paphos (R)	22	5	3	14	20	34	−14	13	Relegation to Cypriot Second Division

(C) Champions; (R) Relegated

== Results ==
Home \ Away	AEL	ALK	ANR	APN	APL	APP	DGN	ENP	EPA	NSL	OMO	POL
AEL		1–0	0–1	0–2	1–0	0–0	2–0	0–1	0–1	2–0	1–1	0–2
Alki	1–1		2–1	2–1	3–1	2–1	0–0	1–1	1–1	2–0	0–2	1–0
Anorthosis	0–0	0–0		1–1	2–0	2–0	0–0	1–0	0–0	3–3	1–1	1–0
APOEL	5–1	0–2	2–3		0–2	3–0	5–0	1–0	3–1	1–0	1–1	1–1
Apollon	2–2	0–0	1–0	2–1		1–0	1–1	0–2	0–2	2–1	1–1	2–0
APOP	3–0	2–1	2–2	0–1	0–1		2–1	2–1	1–3	0–2	0–1	3–1
Digenis	1–0	0–0	0–0	1–0	1–0	2–1		1–0	0–0	1–1	0–2	1–2
ENP	1–0	3–2	1–1	1–0	0–0	1–0	2–1		1–1	0–0	4–1	0–0
EPA	4–0	3–2	2–1	3–0	1–3	3–0	0–0	3–0		4–0	1–3	0–0
Nea Salamis	0–0	0–0	2–1	1–1	0–0	1–1	1–0	0–0	2–3		1–0	1–0
Omonia	2–0	4–0	1–1	1–0	2–1	2–1	0–1	1–0	0–0	1–0		2–0
Pezoporikos	1–1	2–1	0–0	0–0	1–1	3–1	1–0	0–1	0–0	0–0	0–1	

Legend: Blue = home team win; Yellow = draw; Red = away team win.
