= Markos Markou =

Cypriot footballer (born 1949)

Personal information
- Date of birth: August 12, 1949 (age 77)
- Position: Forward

Senior career*
Years	Team	Apps	(Gls)
1967–1972	Olympiakos Nicosia		
1972–1979	APOEL		

International career
1968–1977	Cyprus	17	(0)
- * Club domestic league appearances and goals

Markos Markou (Greek: Μάρκος Μάρκου; born August 12, 1949) is a retired Cypriot football striker.
