= Giorgos Pantziaras =

Cypriot footballer (born 1952)

Personal information
- Full name: Georgios Pantziaras
- Date of birth: August 20, 1952 (age 74)
- Place of birth: Nicosia, Cyprus
- Position: Goalkeeper

Senior career*
Years	Team	Apps	(Gls)
1971–1978	APOEL	88	(0)
1978–1984	Aris	114	(0)
1985–1987	APOEL	35	(0)
1987–1989	Apollon Limassol	56	(0)
Total		293	(0)

International career
1976–1989	Cyprus	22	(0)

Managerial career
- 2003: Aris
- * Club domestic league appearances and goals

Giorgos Pantziaras (Greek: Γιώργος Παντζιαράς; born August 20, 1952) is a Cypriot former international football goalkeeper.

He played for APOEL Nicosia (1971-1978 & 1985-1987), for Aris (1978–1984) and Apollon Limassol (1987–1989).

He also served as head coach of Aris (2002) and in various other capacities in football for Aris as well as, more recently, for Apollon Kalamaria.

== Personal ==
His son is Andreas and his brother is Koulis.
