= ASOB Vatili =

Cypriot football team

- Founded: 1939
- Dissolved: 1977

Athletic Syllogos Olympia Vatili or ASOB Vatili was a Cypriot football team. The team was established in Vatili, Famagusta, in 1939. The Turkish invasion of Cyprus and the subsequent occupation of the Vatily left ASOB with no home, no financial resources, and no stadium. They team were reactive for some years in the free area of Cyprus.

They were played 3 times in Cypriot Third Division.
