= 1975–76 Cypriot First Division =

Cypriot First Division
- Season: 1975–76

The 1975–76 Cypriot First Division was the 37th season of the Cypriot top-level football league.

== Overview ==
It was contested by 15 teams, and AC Omonia won the championship. The top scorer that season was Sotiris Kaiafas with 39 goals, who ended up winning the season's European Golden Shoe, that made him the only Cypriot to have won the award.

== League standings ==
Pos	Team	Pld	W	D	L	GF	GA	GD	Pts	Qualification
1	AC Omonia (C)	28	24	2	2	83	18	+65	50	Qualification for European Cup first round
2	APOEL F.C.	28	17	8	3	65	18	+47	42	Qualification for Cup Winners' Cup first round
3	EN Paralimni	28	17	8	3	45	19	+26	42	Qualification for UEFA Cup first round
4	Pezoporikos Larnaca	28	11	11	6	32	18	+14	33	
5	Anorthosis Famagusta FC	28	10	12	6	39	30	+9	32	
6	Olympiakos Nicosia	28	14	2	12	54	40	+14	30	
7	Alki Larnaca FC	28	10	10	8	45	43	+2	30	
8	AEL Limassol	28	11	8	9	39	44	−5	30	
9	Apollon Limassol	28	10	9	9	43	36	+7	29	
10	Nea Salamis FC	28	8	8	12	35	46	−11	24	
11	EPA Larnaca FC	28	5	12	11	33	35	−2	22	
12	Evagoras Paphos	28	6	6	16	30	68	−38	18	
13	Digenis Akritas Morphou	28	5	7	16	31	65	−34	17	
14	Aris Limassol F.C.	28	4	7	17	30	70	−40	15	
15	ASIL Lysi	28	1	4	23	17	71	−54	6	

(C) Champions

== Results ==
Home \ Away	AEL	ALK	ANR	APN	APL	ARS	ASL	DGN	ENP	EPA	EVA	NSL	OLY	OMO	POL
AEL		1–2	1–1	3–1	1–0	3–3	4–1	6–1	2–2	0–0	1–0	2–4	3–2	0–3	1–0
Alki	5–0		1–1	1–1	2–1	3–0	1–1	1–1	0–4	1–1	3–2	2–2	0–2	2–4	0–1
Anorthosis	2–0	0–0		2–2	0–0	1–0	3–2	4–0	2–2	1–1	3–2	4–2	2–2	0–1	0–1
APOEL	4–0	2–2	1–0		1–1	11–1	4–0	3–1	0–0	2–1	2–0	4–0	0–1	0–1	0–0
Apollon	1–1	4–1	1–3	2–4		2–1	1–0	1–1	1–2	3–2	6–2	1–0	3–0	1–0	0–0
Aris	0–1	1–2	0–1	1–4	1–1		2–0	4–0	0–1	2–2	1–3	2–1	1–0	2–8	0–0
ASIL	0–4	1–4	0–3	0–2	0–1	1–1		1–1	0–1	1–3	0–1	3–4	2–4	0–8	0–3
Digenis	1–3	0–3	2–1	0–3	1–6	3–3	0–1		1–1	2–1	6–1	3–2	2–5	0–1	0–0
ENP	1–0	2–0	1–0	0–0	2–0	5–0	2–1	2–0		1–1	5–1	1–0	0–2	1–1	1–0
EPA	0–0	0–1	2–2	0–2	1–1	5–0	2–0	1–1	0–1		3–0	0–0	0–1	1–3	0–1
Evagoras	0–0	1–2	1–1	0–5	3–1	2–2	1–0	1–0	2–2	2–2		2–1	0–3	0–1	1–1
Nea Salamis	1–1	2–2	0–0	0–0	1–1	1–0	2–1	1–0	1–0	1–1	2–1		3–1	0–1	1–3
Olympiakos	0–1	4–1	0–1	1–2	2–1	3–1	6–0	3–2	2–3	0–1	4–0	4–3		1–4	0–2
Omonia	6–0	3–2	4–0	0–1	3–1	3–1	2–0	5–0	2–1	5–2	7–1	4–0	1–0		1–0
Pezoporikos	3–0	1–1	1–1	0–4	1–1	3–0	1–1	1–2	0–1	1–0	4–0	2–0	1–1	1–1	

Legend: Blue = home team win; Yellow = draw; Red = away team win.
