= 1978–79 Cypriot First Division =

Cypriot First Division
- Season: 1978–79

The 1978–79 Cypriot First Division was the 40th season of the Cypriot top-level football league.

== Overview ==
It was contested by 16 teams, and AC Omonia won the championship.

== League standings ==
Pos	Team	Pld	W	D	L	GF	GA	GD	Pts	Qualification or relegation
1	AC Omonia (C)	30	18	9	3	66	17	+49	45	Qualification for European Cup first round
2	APOEL F.C.	30	20	4	6	54	18	+36	44	Qualification for Cup Winners' Cup preliminary round
3	Alki Larnaca FC	30	12	9	9	41	39	+2	33	Qualification for UEFA Cup first round
4	Aris Limassol F.C.	30	12	8	10	36	34	+2	32	
5	Anorthosis Famagusta FC	30	10	11	9	26	21	+5	31	
6	Pezoporikos Larnaca	30	9	12	9	32	24	+8	30	
7	Apollon Limassol	30	10	10	10	25	28	−3	30	
8	EN Paralimni	30	9	10	11	37	30	+7	28	
9	AEL Limassol	30	6	16	8	24	28	−4	28	
10	EPA Larnaca FC	30	9	9	12	32	35	−3	27	
11	Omonia Aradippou	30	6	15	9	26	31	−5	27	
12	Evagoras Paphos	30	8	11	11	26	35	−9	27	
13	Olympiakos Nicosia	30	10	7	13	26	40	−14	27	
14	APOP Paphos	30	8	11	11	34	49	−15	27	
15	Nea Salamis FC (R)	30	10	6	14	42	48	−6	26	Relegation to Cypriot Second Division
16	Digenis Akritas Morphou (R)	30	4	10	16	21	71	−50	18	Relegation to Cypriot Second Division

(C) Champions; (R) Relegated

== Results ==
Home \ Away	AEL	ALK	ANR	APL	APN	APP	ARS	DGN	ENP	EPA	EVA	NSL	OLY	OMA	OMN	POL
AEL		0–0	1–0	1–2	0–0	1–0	1–1	0–0	1–1	0–0	1–1	1–4	2–0	0–0	2–1	2–2
Alki	2–1		0–0	2–1	2–2	6–0	1–1	1–1	3–2	1–3	2–0	1–1	1–1	1–1	1–6	0–1
Anorthosis	2–0	0–0		1–0	1–0	3–1	0–0	4–0	1–0	0–3	2–0	3–4	0–0	0–0	0–0	1–1
APOEL	1–0	2–1	1–0		4–1	6–2	1–0	9–0	1–0	3–0	1–0	1–0	3–0	2–0	0–0	1–0
Apollon	3–2	1–0	2–0	0–2		0–0	2–0	0–0	1–1	0–2	1–0	1–0	0–0	0–0	0–2	0–0
APOP	0–0	3–0	0–0	0–2	1–1		3–1	2–2	1–1	3–2	2–2	3–2	1–0	2–2	0–1	1–0
Aris	0–2	0–2	0–1	3–1	1–0	3–1		2–2	3–1	1–2	1–1	1–0	1–0	1–0	2–0	3–2
Digenis	0–0	0–2	0–3	1–0	1–3	1–3	1–2		1–0	0–0	0–2	1–5	1–2	1–3	0–4	0–0
ENP	1–1	3–0	2–1	0–2	0–1	0–0	3–2	4–0		1–0	2–0	7–0	1–0	0–0	1–1	1–2
EPA	0–0	1–2	1–0	2–1	1–2	0–1	2–2	0–1	2–0		3–2	1–2	2–0	0–0	1–2	0–0
Evagoras	1–1	0–1	0–0	0–0	1–1	2–1	2–0	3–1	1–2	1–0		0–0	1–0	2–2	2–0	0–0
Nea Salamis	0–2	3–4	2–0	0–3	2–1	3–1	2–3	2–2	3–2	1–1	0–1		0–2	3–2	0–1	0–1
Olympiakos	2–1	2–1	2–1	0–1	1–0	1–1	0–2	1–2	2–1	2–2	0–0	1–0		2–0	1–1	2–1
Omonia Ar.	0–0	1–2	1–2	1–1	1–0	0–0	1–0	1–1	0–0	4–0	4–0	0–0	2–1		0–2	0–1
Omonia	3–0	2–1	0–0	1–1	2–0	6–1	0–0	7–1	0–0	2–0	4–1	1–1	5–1	7–0		4–0
Pezoporikos	1–1	0–1	0–0	2–1	1–2	1–0	0–0	6–0	0–0	1–1	3–0	0–2	6–0	0–0	0–1	

Legend: Blue = home team win; Yellow = draw; Red = away team win.
