= 1977–78 Cypriot First Division =

Cypriot First Division
- Season: 1977–78

The 1977–78 Cypriot First Division was the 39th season of the Cypriot top-level football league.

== Overview ==
It was contested by 16 teams, and AC Omonia won the championship.

== League standings ==
Pos	Team	Pld	W	D	L	GF	GA	GD	Pts	Qualification or relegation
1	AC Omonia (C)	30	22	7	1	77	15	+62	51	Qualification for European Cup first round
2	APOEL F.C.	30	17	7	6	47	20	+27	41	Qualification for Cup Winners' Cup first round
3	Pezoporikos Larnaca	30	15	7	8	40	30	+10	37	Qualification for UEFA Cup first round
4	EN Paralimni	30	12	12	6	38	28	+10	36	
5	Anorthosis Famagusta FC	30	11	13	6	44	29	+15	35	
6	Alki Larnaca FC	30	11	10	9	35	40	−5	32	
7	Aris Limassol F.C.	30	10	11	9	51	41	+10	31	
8	EPA Larnaca FC	30	9	13	8	44	35	+9	31	
9	Apollon Limassol	30	10	10	10	40	36	+4	30	
10	Nea Salamis FC	30	8	12	10	43	48	−5	28	
11	Olympiakos Nicosia	30	7	11	12	26	35	−9	25	
12	AEL Limassol	30	7	10	13	41	48	−7	24	
13	APOP Paphos	30	6	10	14	22	45	−23	22	
14	Evagoras Paphos	30	4	12	14	32	59	−27	20	
15	Digenis Akritas Morphou	30	5	9	16	30	61	−31	19	
16	Chalkanoras Idaliou (R)	30	6	6	18	22	62	−40	18	Relegation to Cypriot Second Division

(C) Champions; (R) Relegated

== Results ==
Home \ Away	AEL	ALK	ANR	APN	APL	APP	ARS	DGN	ENP	EPA	EVA	NSL	OLY	OMO	POL	CHL
AEL		4–2	0–1	1–2	1–1	1–1	0–4	0–0	1–0	1–0	9–0	1–1	3–0	0–3	2–1	3–0
Alki	2–1		0–0	1–1	1–3	0–0	3–1	0–0	1–1	1–1	3–2	1–1	3–0	1–2	2–0	2–0
Anorthosis	2–1	1–0		1–1	2–0	4–0	0–2	4–0	2–0	1–3	3–1	1–1	1–1	1–1	1–2	0–0
APOEL	4–0	2–0	2–1		1–0	4–0	0–1	1–0	5–0	0–0	1–1	4–2	1–0	1–2	2–0	3–0
Apollon	1–1	4–0	3–1	0–1		3–1	0–0	1–2	2–3	0–0	0–0	4–2	0–0	0–5	1–2	3–1
APOP	1–0	2–2	1–0	0–0	2–0		3–1	0–0	0–2	1–1	1–2	1–0	0–0	0–2	1–0	1–1
Aris	2–1	0–1	1–2	0–2	2–2	3–2		4–0	2–1	1–2	1–1	1–2	1–1	2–4	0–1	0–0
Digenis	4–1	1–2	1–1	1–3	1–1	2–0	4–5		1–1	2–2	0–2	1–4	3–5	0–3	2–1	0–0
ENP	1–1	3–0	1–1	2–0	0–0	2–0	2–2	3–0		1–0	2–0	0–0	1–0	0–1	0–2	3–0
EPA	1–1	2–2	1–1	1–1	1–0	5–1	1–1	0–0	2–2		2–0	3–2	2–2	1–3	0–1	5–1
Evagoras	3–3	1–2	0–5	1–2	1–3	2–2	2–2	4–1	0–0	2–3		0–0	1–1	0–0	1–1	2–0
Nea Salamis	1–1	1–1	1–1	2–1	2–3	3–0	2–2	1–3	1–2	1–0	1–1		2–1	2–1	2–2	3–2
Olympiakos	3–2	0–1	1–1	1–0	0–1	1–1	0–0	3–1	0–1	2–0	1–0	0–0		0–2	1–0	0–0
Omonia	5–0	3–0	1–1	1–1	2–0	2–0	0–0	5–0	1–1	2–0	6–0	4–2	1–0		2–2	4–0
Pezoporikos	0–0	3–0	1–1	1–0	1–0	1–1	1–3	3–0	2–2	1–0	3–2	3–1	2–0	0–3		1–0
Chalkanoras	2–1	0–1	2–3	0–1	0–3	1–0	1–7	1–0	1–1	1–5	1–0	3–0	4–2	0–6	0–2	

Legend: Blue = home team win; Yellow = draw; Red = away team win.
