= 1976–77 Cypriot First Division =

Cypriot First Division
- Season: 1976–77

The 1976–77 Cypriot First Division was the 38th season of the Cypriot top-level football league.

== Overview ==
It was contested by 16 teams, and AC Omonia won the championship.

== League standings ==
Pos	Team	Pld	W	D	L	GF	GA	GD	Pts	Qualification or relegation
1	AC Omonia (C)	30	26	2	2	88	20	+68	54	Qualification for European Cup first round
2	APOEL F.C.	30	22	7	1	77	15	+62	51	Qualification for UEFA Cup first round
3	Pezoporikos Larnaca	30	16	8	6	45	21	+24	40	
4	Aris Limassol F.C.	30	16	4	10	53	46	+7	36	
5	EPA Larnaca FC	30	14	7	9	37	24	+13	35	
6	Alki Larnaca FC	30	13	7	10	46	37	+9	33	
7	Anorthosis Famagusta FC	30	13	7	10	35	35	0	33	
8	EN Paralimni	30	9	11	10	48	32	+16	29	
9	Evagoras Paphos	30	12	5	13	38	50	−12	29	
10	Apollon Limassol	30	9	7	14	34	43	−9	25	
11	Olympiakos Nicosia	30	9	7	14	31	44	−13	25	Qualification for Cup Winners' Cup first round
12	Chalkanoras Idaliou	30	10	5	15	37	54	−17	25	
13	Nea Salamis FC	30	6	10	14	36	49	−13	22	
14	AEL Limassol	30	7	8	15	32	49	−17	22	
15	Digenis Akritas Morphou	30	3	8	19	17	71	−54	14	
16	ASIL Lysi (R)	30	1	5	24	25	89	−64	7	Relegation to Cypriot Second Division

(C) Champions; (R) Relegated

== Results ==
Home \ Away	AEL	ALK	ANR	APN	APL	ARS	ASL	DGN	ENP	EPA	EVA	NSL	OLY	OMO	POL	CHL
AEL		2–0	1–2	0–0	3–1	0–2	4–1	2–0	3–1	1–1	0–2	1–1	1–0	0–2	0–4	1–1
Alki	1–0		5–2	0–0	2–0	1–3	4–0	3–0	1–0	1–1	1–0	0–2	3–1	1–2	0–0	0–1
Anorthosis	4–1	0–1		2–0	1–0	1–1	2–1	2–0	1–0	0–2	2–1	1–1	0–2	2–4	3–0	4–1
APOEL	4–0	2–1	1–0		1–0	3–1	4–2	3–0	4–0	2–0	2–0	5–1	4–0	0–0	2–2	3–0
Apollon	0–0	1–2	1–0	0–5		2–0	5–1	1–1	1–1	1–0	3–2	0–0	0–0	0–2	0–1	3–2
Aris	3–1	2–1	4–0	1–6	2–1		2–1	3–0	0–1	1–0	4–1	3–0	4–1	2–3	0–0	1–1
ASIL	2–2	1–2	1–1	0–4	1–4	2–3		0–2	1–1	1–1	1–2	1–4	0–4	2–5	1–2	2–4
Digenis	0–5	2–3	0–0	0–5	3–5	1–4	0–0		0–0	0–2	0–0	1–0	1–2	0–7	0–2	2–3
ENP	3–1	6–2	0–1	1–1	0–0	3–0	7–0	8–1		0–0	1–1	6–0	0–0	0–0	1–1	4–1
EPA	4–1	1–1	3–0	0–1	3–2	2–1	0–1	1–0	0–2		3–0	1–0	2–0	1–3	0–1	2–0
Evagoras	2–0	1–6	1–1	2–5	3–1	1–0	5–1	0–1	1–0	0–0		2–1	2–2	2–7	1–0	1–0
Nea Salamis	2–2	1–1	0–0	1–1	1–0	1–2	4–0	0–0	1–1	1–2	4–1		1–1	1–2	0–3	4–1
Olympiakos	0–0	2–1	0–1	1–1	1–0	1–0	3–1	2–2	3–1	0–2	0–2	2–1		0–2	0–4	1–2
Omonia	1–0	2–0	0–1	0–3	5–0	8–0	4–0	4–0	3–0	3–2	2–0	6–2	2–0		4–0	2–1
Pezoporikos	4–0	1–1	2–0	0–3	0–0	1–2	1–0	0–0	3–0	0–0	1–0	1–0	2–1	0–1		6–0
Chalkanoras	1–0	1–1	1–1	0–2	0–2	2–2	3–0	4–0	1–0	0–1	1–2	2–1	2–1	0–2	1–3	

Legend: Blue = home team win; Yellow = draw; Red = away team win.
