= Ermis Aradippou FC =

Cypriot football club

Ermis Aradippou
- Full name: Ermis Aradippou
- Nicknames: Φτεροπόδαρο, Φτερωτός Θεός.
- Founded: 1958; 68 years ago
- Ground: Dimotiko Stadio Aradippou, Aradippou
- Capacity: 2,000
- Manager: Danos Damianou
- League: Second Division
- 2025–26: Third Division, 3rd of 16 (promoted)
- Website: ermisfc.eu
| Home colours | Away colours |

Ermis Aradippou (Greek: Ερμής Αραδίππου) is a Cypriot professional football club based in Aradippou, a settlement on the outskirts of the city of Larnaca. The club was formed in 1958, and currently plays in the Cypriot Third Division. Ermis' greatest success came in 2014, when they won the Super Cup. Ermis have a long-standing rivalry with their neighbouring club Omonia Aradippou.

== History ==
Ermis spent most of its history in the Cypriot Second Division, first competing in the top flight in 1983, and appearing in two more editions of the competition during that decade.

After being relegated in 2002, the club returned to division one for 2009–10, managing to stay afloat for the first time in its history, after finishing in ninth position. In the 2011–12 season the club was relegated to the second division after three successive seasons in the top flight. The club has achieved a record four successive seasons in the top flight since 2013.

== Honours ==
- Cypriot Super Cup (1):

2014

- Cypriot Second Division (3):

1982–83, 1984–85, 2008–09

- Cypriot Third Division (3):

1975–76, 1996–97, 2006–07

== European record ==
| Season | Competition | Round | Rival | Home | Away | Agg. |
|---|---|---|---|---|---|---|
| 2014–15 | UEFA Europa League | 3Q | (Switzerland) Young Boys | 0–2 | 0–1 | 0–3 |

Notes

- 3Q: Third qualifying round

== Players ==
As of 15 September 2026 Note: Flags indicate national team as defined under FIFA eligibility rules; some limited exceptions apply. Players may hold more than one non-FIFA nationality.

| No. | Pos. | Nation | Player |
|---|---|---|---|
| 3 | DF | CYP | Giannis Efstathiou (captain) |
| 5 | DF | GRE | Alexandros Karmiris |
| 6 | MF | CYP | Giorgos Kondylis |
| 7 | FW | CYP | Stylianos Kallenos |
| 8 | MF | GRE | Rafail Sgouros |
| 9 | FW | POL | Jakub Kieliszewski |
| 10 | MF | CYP | Andreas Kkostis |
| 11 | MF | CYP | Konstantinos Michailidis |
| 14 | DF | CYP | Michalis Chatziprodromou |
| 15 | MF | USA | Bryce Richards |
| 17 | MF | GAM | Ali Trawalli |
| 18 | MF | CYP | Zacharias Panagiotou |
| 21 | MF | CYP | Aristos Ttanos |

| No. | Pos. | Nation | Player |
|---|---|---|---|
| 26 | DF | CYP | Theoklitos Polychroniou (on loan from AEL Limassol) |
| 27 | DF | CYP | Sergios Chatzidimitriou |
| 31 | MF | GNB | Nani Soares |
| 38 | GK | CYP | Michalis Sofroniou |
| 41 | MF | CYP | Konstantinos Kyzi |
| 44 | FW | CYP | Nikolas Mattheou |
| 45 | FW | ITA | Junior Djile |
| 47 | MF | BEL | Badr Oulad Abdellah |
| 55 | MF | GAM | Emmanuel Mendy |
| 61 | GK | CYP | Alexandros Antoniou |
| 89 | DF | CYP | Lampros Genethliou |
| 96 | DF | CYP | Andreas Kamaris |
| 99 | GK | CYP | Savvas Stavrinou |

=== Out on loan ===
Note: Flags indicate national team as defined under FIFA eligibility rules; some limited exceptions apply. Players may hold more than one non-FIFA nationality.

| No. | Pos. | Nation | Player |

For recent transfers, see Cyprus Football Association.

== Managers ==
- (Serbia) Dušan Mitošević (2009–10)
- (Cyprus) Demetris Ioannou (interim) (2010)
- (Portugal) João Carlos Pereira (2010–11)
- (Cyprus) Panayiotis Xiourouppas (2011)
- (Cyprus) Nicos Panayiotou (2013–14)
- (Cyprus) Nikodimos Papavasiliou (2014–15)
- (Netherlands) Mitchell van der Gaag (2015)
- (Cyprus) Ioannis Okkas (2015)
- (Greece) Pavlos Dermitzakis (2015)
- (Cyprus) Nicos Panayiotou (2015–2017)

== Affiliated club ==
- (Greece) Ermis Zoniana
