= Ethnikos Asteras Limassol =

Ethnikos Asteras Limassol.
- Full name: Ethnikos Asteras Limassol Football Club.
- Founded: 1957.
- Dissolved: 1977 or 1978.

Ethnikos Asteras Limassol was a Cypriot football club based in the area of Ayios Ioannis, Limassol. Founded in 1957, was playing sometimes in Second and in Third Division. After the start of 1977-78 the team withdrew from the league and from Cyprus Football Association.

== Honours ==
- Cypriot Third Division:
  - Champions (1): 1972
