= APOEL FC =

Football club in Nicosia, Cyprus

APOEL
- Full name: Αθλητικός Ποδοσφαιρικός Όμιλος Ελλήνων Λευκωσίας; Athletikos Podosferikos Omilos Ellinon Lefkosias (Athletic Football Club of Greeks of Nicosia)
- Nickname: Τhrylos (The Legend)
- Short name: APOEL
- Founded: 8 November 1926; 100 years ago
- Ground: GSP Stadium
- Capacity: 22,859
- Owner: APOEL Football Limited
- Chairman: Harris Photiou
- Head coach: Nikos Papadopoulos
- League: First Division
- 2025–26: First Division, 5th of 14
- Website: apoelfc.com.cy
Home colours	Away colours	Third colours

APOEL FC (Greek: ΑΠΟΕΛ; short for Αθλητικός Ποδοσφαιρικός Όμιλος Ελλήνων Λευκωσίας, Athletikos Podosferikos Omilos Ellinon Lefkosias, lit. "Athletic Football Club of Greeks of Nicosia") is a Cypriot professional football club based in Nicosia, Cyprus. APOEL is the most successful football team in Cyprus with an overall tally of 29 national championships, 21 cups, and 13 super cups.

APOEL's greatest moment in European competition occurred in the 2011–12 season, when they advanced out of the group stage of the UEFA Champions League (winning a group that included FC Porto, Shakhtar Donetsk, and Zenit St. Petersburg), then eliminated Olympique Lyonnais in the last 16, to become the first Cypriot team to reach the quarter-finals of the Champions League. APOEL's European competitions highlights also include appearances in the group stages of the 2009–10 and 2014–15 UEFA Champions League and the group stages of the 2013–14, 2015–16, and 2016–17 UEFA Europa League. They marked their most successful UEFA Europa League campaign during the 2016–17 season, when they managed to top their group (along with Olympiacos, Young Boys, and Astana) and eliminated Athletic Bilbao in the round of 32, to reach the last 16 of the competition for the first time in their history. APOEL is the only Cypriot club who have reached the group stages (and the knockout stages) of both major UEFA competitions (UEFA Champions League and UEFA Europa League). In the 2016–17 season, APOEL drew an average home league attendance of 7,126 and their highest league attendance was 15,462. Both were the highest in the league.

APOEL FC is part of the APOEL multi-sport club, which was founded in 1926 and maintains departments for several sports including football, basketball, volleyball, futsal, table tennis, bowling, cycling, archery, swimming and water polo. APOEL is one of the founding members of the Cyprus Football Association and also an ordinary member of the European Club Association, an organization that replaced the previous G-14 which consists of major football clubs in Europe.

== History ==
=== 1926–1929: The early years ===
The club was formed as POEL (Greek: ΠΟΕΛ; Ποδοσφαιρικός Όμιλος Ελλήνων Λευκωσίας, Podosferikos Omilos Ellinon Lefkosias, Football Club of Greeks of Nicosia) on 8 November 1926. The club's formation came about when a group of forty people, with a common vision, met and set the foundations for creating a football club that would represent the Greek residents of the capital and express their deep desire for Cyprus' incorporation (enosis) into Greece. The meeting took place at a traditional confectionery, owned by Charalambos Hadjioannou, downtown in Ledra Street and the first president of the club was Giorgos Poulias. The first clubhouse was the "Athenians Club" (Λέσχη Αθηναίων) at the end of Ledra Street.

After a journey to the football club in Alexandria, Egypt in 1927 the General Assembly of 1928 decided the players showed that they were not just good footballers but also excellent track and field athletes. Hence it was decided to create a track and field team in addition to the football team. The name APOEL was adopted to reflect this, with the 'A' standing for 'Athletic'. Soon after a volleyball team and a table tennis team were established.

=== The 1930s : The first league titles ===
Cyprus did not have any country-wide league until 1932. Football clubs of the time played friendly matches only. In 1932, Pezoporikos Larnaca organised an unofficial league, the first island-wide league, and it was won by APOEL after defeating AEL Limassol in the final by 4–0. In 1934, there was a disagreement between Trust and Anorthosis Famagusta on the organisation of the fourth unofficial league. APOEL and AEL Limassol organised a meeting for the foundation of a country-wide governing body and an official country-wide league. The meeting took place in APOEL's clubhouse on 23 September and the establishment of the Cyprus Football Association was agreed. Two years later the APOEL football team celebrated its first championship title of the official Cyprus football league. APOEL also won the championship for the following four years, making this a very successful period for the club with 5 consecutive championships (1936–1940).

=== The 1948 conflicts ===
APOEL one of the most knowned Right-wing team in Cyprus Politics, however, would soon spark conflict within the team. On 23 May 1948 the board of the club send a telegram to the Hellenic Association of Amateur Athletics (Greek: Σ.Ε.Γ.Α.Σ.), with the opportunity of the annual Panhellenic Track and Field Competition, which included wishes that "the rebellion" is finished. Several leftist club members perceived the telegram as a political comment on the Greek Civil War and they distanced themselves from the club. A few days later, on 4 June 1948, they founded AC Omonia, which until today is the archrival of APOEL and there has been a traditional animosity between the fans of the two teams.

=== 1955–59 period ===
More conflicts led to further struggles for APOEL. Athletes belonging to the club frequently participated in national clashes. During the 1955–59 national uprising against the British, many of APOEL's athletes and members of the club were active members of EOKA (the National Organisation of Cypriot Fighters), the most outstanding example being the club's track and field athlete Michalakis Karaolis who was hanged by the British colonial authorities. During this period the football team had their closest brush with relegation as most football players were actively taking part in the national struggle.

=== Triumph in the 1963–64 UEFA Cup Winners' Cup ===
The football team were quickly back to full strength and made their debut in European Competitions (the first not only for APOEL but for any Cypriot team) in 1963, when they faced the Norwegian team SK Gjøvik-Lyn in the UEFA Cup Winners' Cup. Two victories for APOEL over both legs (6–0, 1–0) marked APOEL's successful European debut, as they became the first Hellenic team to progress in a European Competition. The next round against the tournament winners Sporting Clube de Portugal met APOEL with their heaviest defeat ever (16–1) and put an end to APOEL's European debut.

=== The successful participation in pan-Hellenic Greek Championship ===
Other triumphs followed in the early 1970s. In 1973 the domestic double was achieved with coach Panos Markovic. The following year APOEL became the only Cypriot team to avoid relegation from the Alpha Ethniki. That was also the last season that the Cypriot champion played in the Greek Football League the following year due to the volatile situation in Cyprus during 1974.

=== The 1980s: European Cup 1986–87 withdrawal ===
The 1980s were a relatively fruitless period for APOEL. They have only won two championships (1980,1986), one cup (1984) and two super cups (1984, 1986). In 1986 APOEL was drawn against Beşiktaş J.K. for the second round of the European Cup. This was the first time that a Cypriot team faced a Turkish team in a European football competition. The Cypriot government prohibited APOEL from playing against the Turkish team, so APOEL was punished with two years disqualification from any UEFA competition. This penalty was later reduced to one-year.

=== The 1990s: The unbeaten "double" in 1995–96 ===
The 1990s were a successful decade for APOEL with 3 championships (1990, 1992, 1996), 5 cups (1993, 1995, 1996, 1997, 1999) and 4 super cups (1992, 1993, 1996, 1999). The most successful season in the 1990s was 1995–96 in which APOEL achieved a celebratory double while remaining undefeated in the league. The basketball team won a double on the same season, making this the ideal season for a 70th anniversary celebration.

=== The formation of APOEL FC Company ===
APOEL Football (Public) Ltd was established in May 1997, after the decision of APOEL committee. This had a significant effect on the club because it separated the activities of the football team from those of the sports club. The formation of the company was necessitated by the financial difficulties the team faced at the time. The company began its operations with a capital of CY £600,000.

=== 2000s–2010s: Domestic domination ===
APOEL is the most successful football team in Cyprus since the 2000s. In seventeen years, the club won twelve championships (2002, 2004, 2007, 2009, 2011, 2013, 2014, 2015, 2016, 2017, 2018, 2019), four cups (2006, 2008, 2014, 2015) and seven super cups (2002, 2004, 2008, 2009, 2011, 2013, 2019). In the 2013–14 season, APOEL achieved a historical domestic treble by winning all the Cypriot competitions trophies, the league, the cup, and the super cup. The next season (2014–15), the club won their second consecutive double. In the 2016–17 season, APOEL managed to win their fifth consecutive league title and equalled the club's record which was set 77 years before (1936–1940).

=== 2020s ===
The 2020–21 season marked the end of APOEL's dominance in Cyprus as they failed to make the championship playoffs for the first time in the club's history. The following season, APOEL finished third, missing out on Champions League qualification in the last matchday, and instead qualifying for the Europa Conference League. They missed out on the 2022–23 championship, finishing in second place, despite being first at the end of the regular season. APOEL returned to domestic glory in 2024, winning the championship for a record-extending 29th time. It has been revealed that APOEL has debts of 50+ million euros and so far they are trying to find investors in order to save the club from debts, unsuccessfully.

== European ambitions ==
APOEL's first great run in European competitions came in 2002, when the team was knocked out on the third qualifying round of the UEFA Champions League, entered the UEFA Cup and reached the second round of the competition. The following years, APOEL qualified four times for the UEFA Champions League group stages (2009–10, 2011–12, 2014–15, 2017–18), and managed to reach the quarter-finals in the 2011–12 season. The team also participated in the group stages of the 2013–14, 2015–16 & 2016–17 UEFA Europa League, managing to reach the last 16 of the competition in the 2016–17 season.

== APOEL FC as a company ==
The football department of APOEL is legally owned by APOEL Football (Public) Ltd (Greek: ΑΠΟΕΛ Ποδόσφαιρο (Δημόσια) Λτδ), a public limited company, since 1997. The company's main activity is the management, operation and commercial exploitation of APOEL Football club. The company owns all the rights for the football department under an agreement with APOEL sports club and pays the club CY£100,000 annually for the privilege. The agreement between the company and the club is renewed every five years. The company has 1745 shareholders and besides the football club, also maintains a team boutique (Orange Shop), the APOELFC (Greek: ΑΠΟΕΛFC) magazine and the apoelfc.com.cy website among others.

== Youth Academy ==
APOEL's youth academy is a separate legal entity from the football club. They are responsible for the under 21 teams for football, basketball and volleyball and they have their own board of directors and budget. The football academy has produced many quality Cypriot players over the years. Players started from the academy and had great contribution APOEL are: Marinos Satsias, Constantinos Charalambides, Nektarios Alexandrou, Michalis Morfis and Marios Antoniades. All of them have also competed at international level with the Cyprus national football team while Charalambides and Alexandrou have played for teams in the Greek Super League in the past.

=== UEFA Youth League participations ===
APOEL's U19 team participated for the first time in the UEFA Youth League group stage during 2014–15 season, drawn in Group F alongside Barcelona, Paris Saint-Germain and Ajax. APOEL managed to collect only one point after drawing 0–0 with Ajax at home and lost their other five Group F matches. They lost twice to Barcelona (2–3 at home, 0–3 away), lost twice to Paris Saint-Germain (0–3 at home, 0–6 away) and also lost to Ajax 1–4 away, finishing fourth in their group.

The next two seasons, APOEL's U19 team participated again in the UEFA Youth League. The 2015–16 season they competed in the first round of the Domestic Champions Path, being drawn to face Puskás Akadémia from Hungary. After a dramatic 3–3 draw in the first leg in Nicosia, APOEL U19 suffered a heavy 6–1 loss in Felcsút and were eventually eliminated. The 2016–17 season they competed in the first round of the Domestic Champions Path, being eliminated by Italian side A.S. Roma after losing 0–3 at home and 1–6 in Italy.

== Colours and badge ==
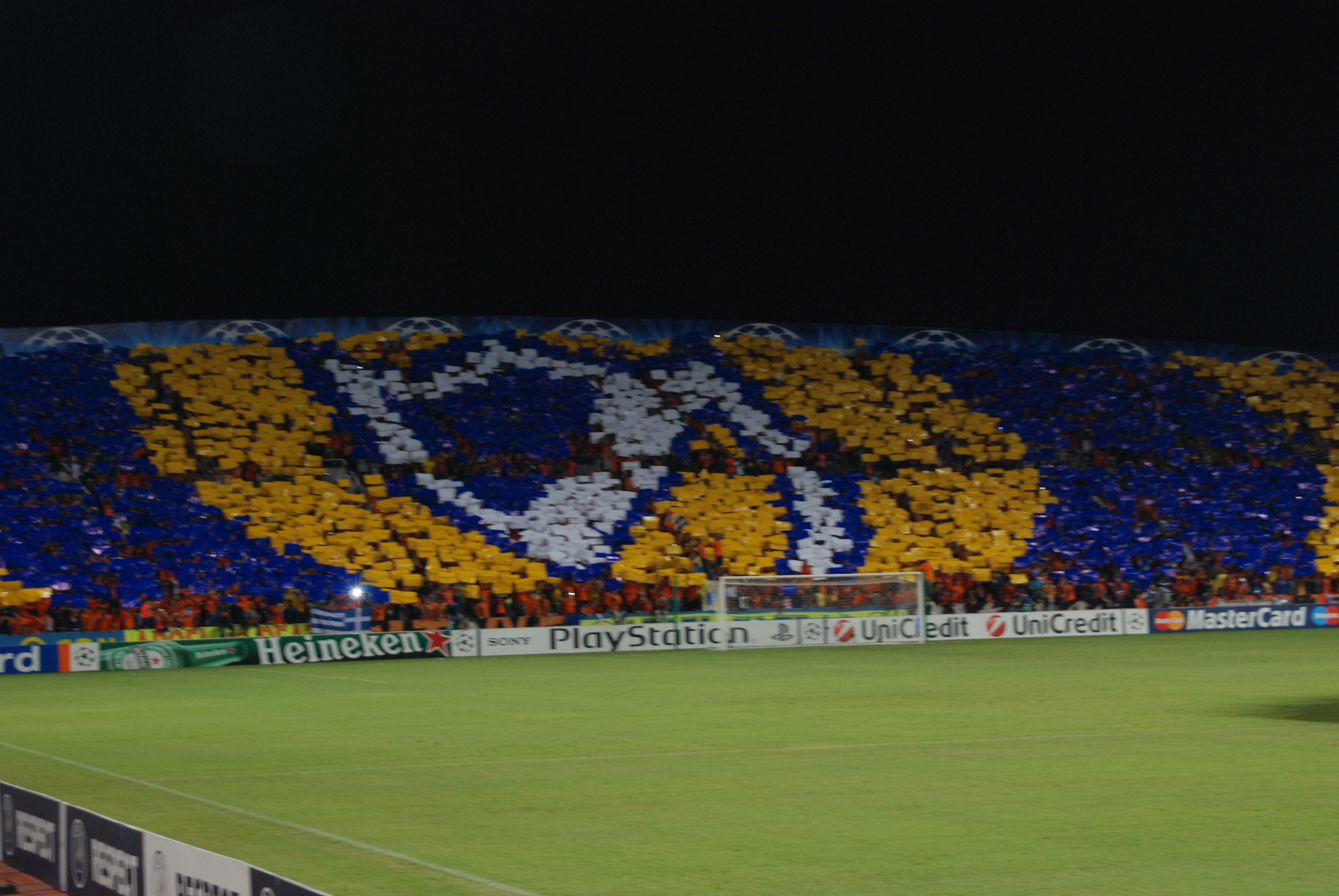
The club's colours and badge displayed by APOEL fans in the 2009–10 Champions League match against Chelsea.

APOEL's colours are blue and yellow. Blue symbolizes Greece and yellow symbolizes Byzantium. The logo is a blue and yellow shield with the name of the club written diagonally in blue. After the club won their 20th championship (2008–09 season), two stars were added above the logo to symbolize the 20 championship titles (one star for every ten championships won). Other than that, the badge has remained the same since the establishment of the club.

== Stadium ==
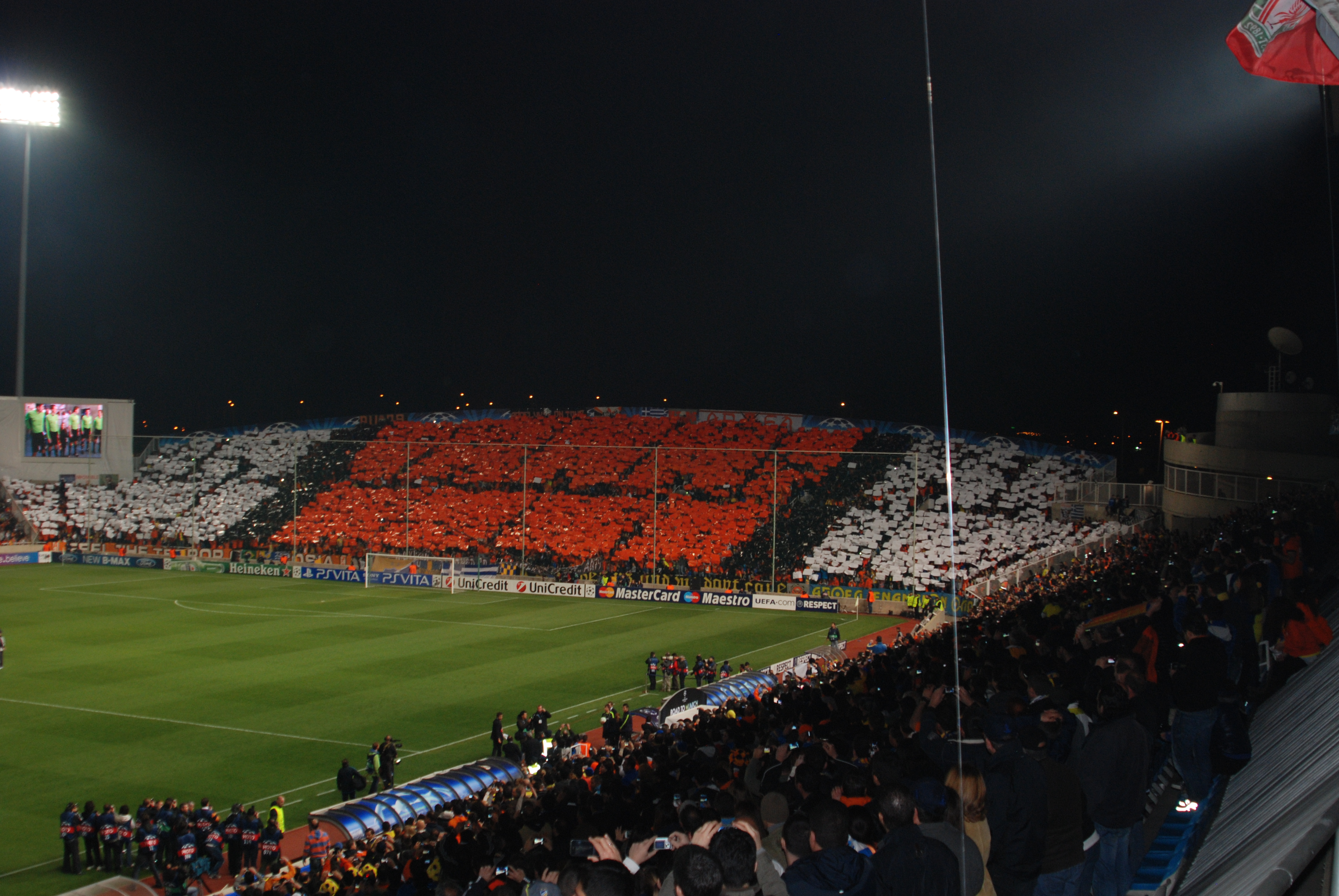
Choreography of APOEL FC fans in a Uefa Champions League game against Real Madrid

APOEL's home ground since 23 October 1999, is the 22,859 seater GSP Stadium. It is the largest stadium in Cyprus and they share it with local rivals Omonia and Olympiakos Nicosia.

Before moving to GSP Stadium, APOEL used as home grounds the Makario Stadium (from 1978 until 1999) and the old GSP Stadium (prior to 1978).

== Club culture and supporters ==
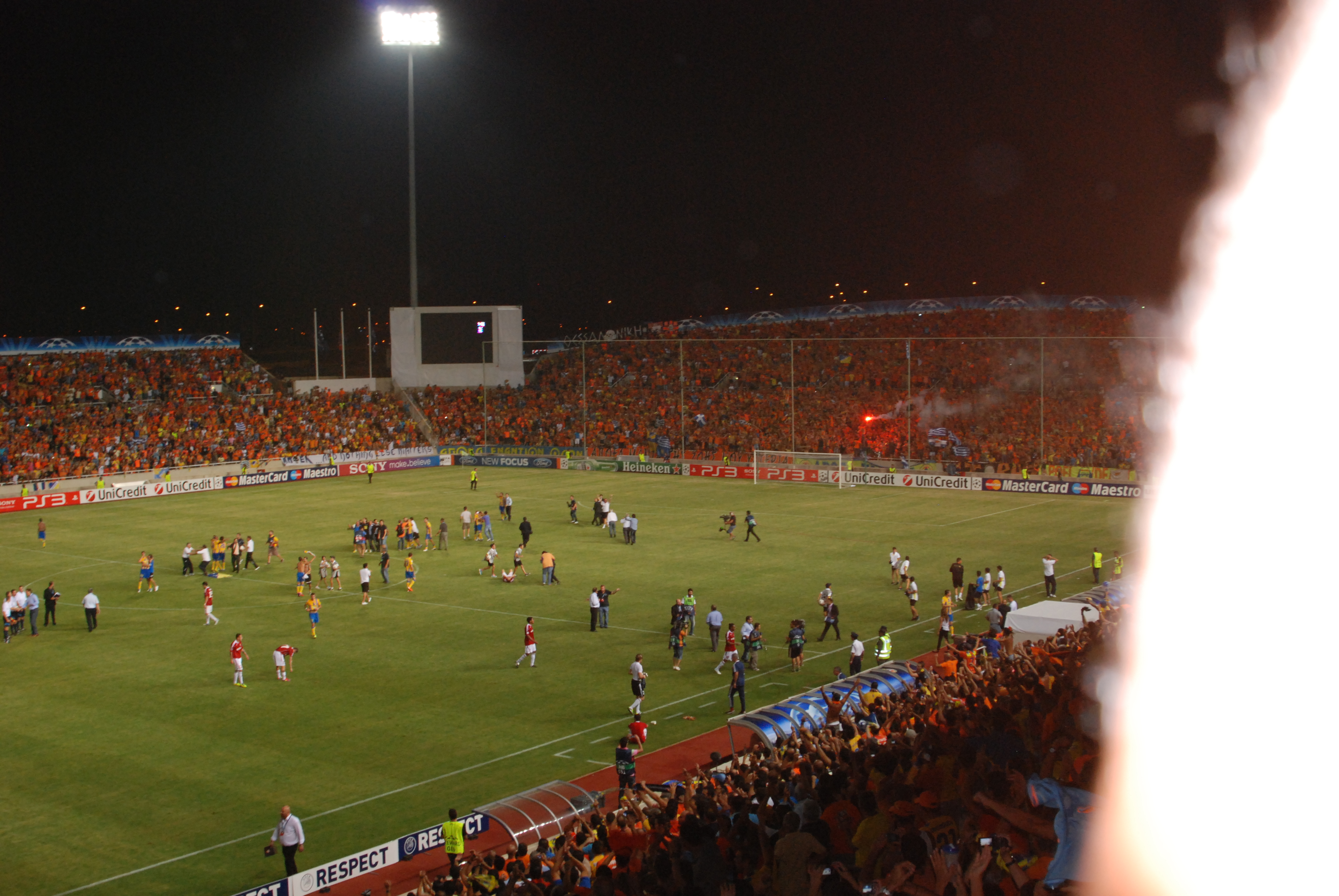
APOEL fans celebrating after eliminating Wisła Kraków in the play-off round of the 2011–12 UEFA Champions League.

APOEL is one of the most popular teams in Cyprus. The main supporter group is PAN.SY.FI (Greek: ΠΑΝ.ΣΥ.ΦΙ), founded in 1979, with branches in major cities in Cyprus and abroad. They are identified by orange jackets or T-shirts, first worn during the 1992–93 first-round game against AEL Limassol at Makario Stadium. APOEL reserves shirt number 79 in honour of PAN.SY.FI.

The club's single-season home ticket record is 141,268 (15 league matches) during the 2010–11 season, and the highest average league attendance is 9,582 (13 matches) during 2012–13. Season ticket sales peaked at over 8,000 in 2014–15.

APOEL holds the record for highest home attendance in the Cyprus First Division with 23,043 tickets against AC Omonia during the 2002–03 season at GSP Stadium. The highest European competition attendance for a Cypriot team was 22,701 tickets against Olympique Lyonnais in the 2011–12 UEFA Champions League last 16 at GSP Stadium.

Large away support has been recorded in UEFA competitions: over 6,000 fans traveled to London for the 2009–10 Champions League group stage match against Chelsea F.C. on 8 December 2009, over 5,000 traveled to Olympique Lyonnais on 14 February 2012, and approximately 4,000 traveled to Real Madrid on 4 April 2012 for the UEFA Champions League quarter-finals.

During the 2009–10 season, APOEL sold 244,977 tickets for all home matches in domestic and European competitions, the highest by a Cypriot club in a single season.

=== Politics ===
APOEL FC supporters are associated with right-wing politics and, at times, the Democratic Rally (DISY) political party, as seen in 2008 when the club publicly supported DISY candidate Ioannis Kasoulides. The club’s fan base generally aligns with Greek nationalist and conservative ideologies, emphasising a Hellenic identity and opposing left-wing parties such as AKEL, and clubs aligned with them such as AC Omonia.

In October 2003, APOEL president Dinos Fysentzides publicly condemned a small group of neo-Nazi supporters known as the "Pirates", stating that they were in no way affiliated with the club and were barred from attending matches. The Pirates had displayed swastikas and Nazi insignia, performed the fascist salute, and expressed Holocaust denial on their website. Police confirmed that any members attending games would be arrested, and the club reported their identities to authorities. That same month, former APOEL player Varnavas Stipanovic denied any affiliation with the Pirate group, despite wearing one of their t-shirts during a May cup game against AEK at Larnaca’s GSZ stadium. A photograph of him in the shirt appeared on the group’s website. Stipanovic stated that he wore the shirt as a favour for a neighbour and was unaware of the group’s ideology. APOEL president Dinos Fysentzides suggested the photograph had likely been tampered with. Stipanovic expressed regret if his actions caused any upset.

APOEL fans have also displayed political and nationalist banners at matches. In November 2017, during a match against Omonia, a group of Apoel fans hoisted a banner denying the 1973 Athens Polytechnic uprising, which provoked condemnation from Greek media and accusations of links to extremist nationalist groups. In August 2025, another incident involved APOEL fans displaying a banner at a match in Larnaca targeting Fidias Panayiotou with racist and abusive language, prompting a police investigation under Cyprus's Law on the Prevention and Suppression of Violence in Sports Venues.

== Rivalries ==
=== Nicosia derby ===
The Nicosia derby (or the Derby of the eternal enemies) refers to the Nicosia's local derby, football matches played between APOEL and Omonia. It is the classic rivalry of the Cypriot football, as the two teams are the most successful and most popular football clubs of the island. The rivalry is also indicative of social, cultural and political differences and originates from 1948 when the board of APOEL sent a telegram to the Hellenic Association of Amateur Athletics (Greek: Σ.Ε.Γ.Α.Σ.), with the opportunity of the annual Panhellenic Track and Field Competition stating its wish for the "communist mutiny" to be ended. Club's players considering this action as a political comment on the Greek Civil War distanced themselves or were expelled from APOEL and a month later they formed Omonia. The first derby was played on 12 December 1953 and ended in a goalless draw.

== Current squad ==
As of 16 September 2026

Note: Flags indicate national team as defined under FIFA eligibility rules; some limited exceptions apply. Players may hold more than one non-FIFA nationality.

No.	Pos.	Nation	Player
1	GK	CRO	Oliver Zelenika
3	DF	GRE	Kostas Stafylidis
4	DF	CYP	Nikolas Angelopoulos
5	DF	AUS	Miloš Degenek
6	MF	CYP	Stylianos Vrontis
7	FW	ARG	Daniel Mancini
8	MF	GBS	Dálcio
9	FW	GRE	Tasos Bakasetas
10	FW	BRA	Marquinhos
11	FW	BRA	Gabriel Maioli
14	DF	ESP	Ángel García
15	FW	ARG	Fabricio Pedrozo
16	DF	ESP	Álvaro Carrillo
18	MF	GRE	Dimitrios Limnios
19	MF	ITA	Gustavo Manduca

No.	Pos.	Nation	Player
21	DF	CYP	Konstantinos Poursaitidis
23	MF	CYP	Panayiotis Kattirtzis
25	DF	ESP	Joan Sastre
27	GK	SLO	Vid Belec
31	MF	SRB	Filip Đuričić
32	MF	CYP	Ioannis Avraamides
34	DF	CYP	Konstantinos Laifis (Captain)
45	DF	CYP	Konstantinos Giannakou
70	FW	CYP	Stavros Georgiou
72	MF	CZE	Antonín Barák
78	GK	CYP	Savvas Michos
91	GK	CYP	Stratos Voniatis
79	FW	CYP	Pieros Sotiriou
99	MF	ARG	Facundo Pérez

=== Out on loan ===
Note: Flags indicate national team as defined under FIFA eligibility rules; some limited exceptions apply. Players may hold more than one non-FIFA nationality.

No.	Pos.	Nation	Player
—	GK	CYP	Andreas Christodoulou (at Krasava until 30 June 2027)
—	GK	BRA	Gabriel Pereira (at Omonia Aradippou until 30 June 2027)
—	DF	BRA	Vitor Meer (at Iraklis until 30 June 2027)

No.	Pos.	Nation	Player
—	MF	BRA	Diego Rosa (at Qarabağ until 30 June 2027)
—	FW	BRA	Pedro Ataide (at Selangor until 30 June 2027)

== Club officials ==
=== Board of directors ===
Position	Staff
Chairman	Harris Photiou
Vice-chairmen	Nicos Kouyialis
Members
Members	Stelios Zampas
Members	Charis Panayides
Members	Marios Panayiotou
Members	Thanasis Christoforou

Source: apoelfc.com.cy

=== Personnel ===
Position	Staff
Director of Football Administration	(Cyprus) Thanasis Christoforou
Technical Director	(Greece) Zisis Vryzas
Financial Controller	(Cyprus) Alexis Demetriou
Operations Manager	(Cyprus) Marios Christodoulou
Marketing manager	(Greece) George Lykouris
Youth Academies General Manager	(Cyprus) George Markides
Head of Communications Department	(Cyprus) Nectarios Petevinos
Team manager	(Cyprus) George Savvides
Accountant	(Cyprus) Antigoni Lambrou

Source: apoelfc.com.cy

=== Technical staff ===
Technical staff
Head Coach	(Greece) Nikos Papadopoulos
Assistant Coach	(Greece) Nikos Karampetakis
Fitness Coach	(Greece) Nikos Karydas
Goalkeeping Coach	(Greece) Antonis Lykouris
Second Assistant Coach/Analyst	(Cyprus) Markos Spanos
Secondary Fitness Coach	(Cyprus) Paul Kinan
Scouting staff
Head Scout	(Cyprus) Giannos Dimosthenous

Source: apoelfc.com.cy

Nikos Papadopoulos* : Η συμφωνία με τον Ελλαδίτη τεχνικό ισχύει από την 1η Ιουλίου 2026 και ολοκληρώνεται τον Μάιο του 2028. apoelfc.com.cy

=== Medical staff ===
Medical staff
Head of Medical	(Russia) Dr. Alexander Rezerov
Physiotherapist	(Greece) Minas Tsiaoukkas
Physiotherapists	(Cyprus) Achilleas Askotis
Physiotherapists	(Cyprus) Avgoustinos Evriviadis
Masseur	(Greece) Evangelos Kanellos
Nutritionist	(Cyprus) Chrysostomos Eiades
Caregivers	(Cyprus) Costas Stefanou
Caregivers	(Cyprus) Damith Poddiva
Caregivers	(Cyprus) Sidhu Gurpreet
Caregivers	(Cyprus) Andreas Christoforou (greenkeeper)

Source: apoelfc.com.cy

== Sponsorship ==
=== Main sponsors ===
- Main Sponsor – Stoiximan
- Sponsor of Sports Material – macron
- Official Broadcaster – cablenet
- Official sponsor – TA MERI FINANCE
- Official sponsor – ISX
- Official sponsor – LONDOU BROS
- Official sponsor – Nurofen
- Official sponsor – Jointace
- Official sponsor – G.u.m
- Official sponsor – PRODROMOU & MAKRIYIANNIS INSURANCE
- Official sponsor – Osteocare
- Supporter – Pizza Hut
- Supporter – PASTA STRADA Pasta & Salad Bar
- Supporter – PANAYIOTIDES Gifts Textiles
- Supporter – Hope CARE
- Supporter – LifeFitness
- Supporter – elvetiko DIAGNOSTIC CENTER
- Supporter – Vittel
- Supporter – TYMVIOS LABS Klinika Chimeia
- Supporter – REANDA
- Supporter – PETROLINA
- Supporter – Landas COLOUR Signs & Digital Printing
- Supporter – LYLE & SCOTT EST 1874
- Supporter – 1210 media
- Supporter – SEAPHIRE Ribco

Source: apoelfc.com.cy

== Managerial history ==
Last Update: 8 June 2026

- 1931–1933 (Hungary) Antone Jean
- 1933–1951 (Hungary) József Künsztler
- 1951–1952 (Cyprus) Pambos Avraamides
- 1952–1953 (Hungary) Béla Guttmann
- 1953–1954 (Cyprus) Pambos Avraamidis
- 1954–1955 (Israel) Schwartz
- 1955–1956 (Austria) Hanz
- 1956–1958 (Cyprus) Kostas Talianos
- 1958–1959 (Cyprus) Takis Tsigkis
- 1959–1961 (Greece) Vaggelis Choumis
- 1961–1962 (Cyprus) Andreas Lazarides
- 1962–1963 (England) Jesse Carver
- 1963–1964 (England) Neil Franklin
- 1964–1965 (Cyprus) Kostas Talianos
- 1965–1966 (Hungary) Gyula Zsengellér
- 1966–1967 (Hungary) Lajos Szendrödi
- 1967 (Cyprus) Lykourgos Archontidis
- 1967–1969 (Cyprus) Pambos Avraamides
- 1969–1970 (England) Jesse Carver
- 1970–1971 (Cyprus) Andreas Lazarides
- 1971–1972 (England) Ray Wood
- 1972–1974 (Greece) Panos Markovic
- 1974–1975 (Cyprus) Andreas Lazarides
- 1975 (Greece) Panos Markovic
- 1975–1976 (Cyprus) Andreas Lazarides
- 1976–1977 (Cyprus) Savvas Partakis
- 1977–1978 (England) Keith Spurgeon
- 1978–1981 (Cyprus) Andreas Lazarides
- 1981–1983 (England) Mike Ferguson
- 1983–1985 (Greece) Panos Markovic
- 1985–1989 (Northern Ireland) Tommy Cassidy
- 1989–1990 (Greece) Giannis Matzourakis
- 1990–1991 (Croatia) Stanko Poklepović
- 1991–1993 (Poland) Jacek Gmoch
- 1993–1994 (Cyprus) Takis Antoniou
- 1994–1995 (Greece) Giannis Matzourakis
- 1995–1996 (Bulgaria) Hristo Bonev
- 1996 (Serbia) Svetozar Šapurić
- 1996–1997 (Poland) Jacek Gmoch
- 1997 (Greece) Nikos Alefantos
- 1997–1998 (Austria) Kurt Jara
- 1998 (Cyprus) Andreas Mouskallis
- 1998 (Cyprus) Costas Georgiou
- 1998–1999 (Greece) Georgios Paraschos
- 1999 (Serbia) Slobodan Vučeković
- 1999–2000 (Cyprus) Andreas Michaelides
- 2000 (Serbia) Svetozar Šapurić
- 2000 (Cyprus) Markos Markou
- 2000–2001 (Wales) Mike Walker
- 2001–2002 (Netherlands) Eugène Gerards
- 2002–2003 (Greece) Takis Lemonis
- 2003 (Czech Republic) Dušan Uhrin
- 2003–2005 (Serbia) Ivan Jovanović
- 2005 (Germany) Werner Lorant
- 2005 (Cyprus) Marios Constantinou
- 2005–2006 (Poland) Jerzy Engel
- 2006–2008 (Greece) Marinos Ouzounidis
- 2008–2013 (Serbia) Ivan Jovanović
- 2013 (Portugal) Paulo Sérgio
- 2013–2015 (Greece) Georgios Donis
- 2015 (Germany) Thorsten Fink
- 2015 (Portugal) Domingos Paciência
- 2015–2016 (Georgia (country)) Temur Ketsbaia
- 2016–2017 (Spain) Thomas Christiansen
- 2017 (Netherlands) Mario Been
- 2017–2018 (Greece) Georgios Donis
- 2018 (Portugal) Bruno Baltazar
- 2018–2019 (Italy) Paolo Tramezzani
- 2019 (Germany) Thomas Doll
- 2019 (Cyprus) Loukas Hadjiloukas (interim)
- 2019–2020 (Norway) Kåre Ingebrigtsen
- 2020 (Greece) Marinos Ouzounidis
- 2020–2021 (Republic of Ireland) Mick McCarthy
- 2021 (Greece) Savvas Poursaitidis
- 2021–2022 (Cyprus) Sofronis Avgousti
- 2022–2023 (Serbia) Vladan Milojević
- 2023–2024 (Portugal) Ricardo Sá Pinto
- 2024 (Spain) David Gallego
- 2024 (Portugal) José Dominguez
- 2024–2025 (Spain) Manuel Jiménez
- 2025–2026 (Uruguay) Pablo García
- 2026 (Greece) Nikos Papadopoulos

== Presidential history ==
APOEL has had numerous presidents over the course of their history. Since the establishment of APOEL Football Ltd, the presidents of the board of directors of the company (chairmen) have assumed all presidential duties for the football club. Here are complete lists of both:

Presidents:

- 1926–1958 – Georgios Poulias
- 1958–1967 – Εfthyvoulos Αnthoullis
- 1967–1968 – Michalakis Triantafyllides
- 1968–1969 – Takis Skarparis
- 1969–1971 – Constantinos Loukos
- 1971–1974 – Michalakis Zivanaris
- 1974–1975 – Kikis Lazarides
- 1975–1983 – Iakovos Filippou
- 1983–1988 – Michalakis Zivanaris
- 1988–1991 – Andreas Papaellinas
- 1991–1992 – Kykkos Fotiades
- 1992–1994 – Mike Ioannides
- 1994–1996 – Christos Triantafyllides
- 1996–1999 – Ouranios Ioannides
- 1999–2000 – Dinos Palmas
- 2002–2004 – Dinos Fisentzides
- 2004–2007 – Yiannos Ioannou
- 2007–2008 – Costas Schizas
- 2008–2009 – Christodoulos Ellinas
- 2009–2011 – Prodromos Petrides
- 2011–2012 – Aris Vasilopoulos
- 2012–2014 – Christoforos Potamitis
- 2014–2016 – Marios Charalambous
- 2016– – Christoforos Potamitis
- 2017–
- 2018–
- 2019–
- 2020–
- 2021–
- 2022–
- 2023–
- 2024–2026– Kyriakos Zavanaris
- 2026–present – Dr. Costas Schizas

Chairmen:

- 1997–1998 – Mike Ioannides
- 1998–2000 – Christos Triantafyllides
- 2000–2001 – Harris Papanastasiou
- 2001–2006 – Prodromos Petrides
- 2006–2008 – Kyriakos Zivanaris
- 2008–2013 – Phivos Erotokritou
- 2013–2026 – Prodromos Petrides
- 2026–present – Harris Photiou

== Former players ==
List of former players with national team appearances or having won multiple titles with the club:

Cyprus

- (Cyprus) Marios Agathokleous (2001–2003)
- (Cyprus) Takis Antoniou (1972–1986)
- (Cyprus) Aristos Aristokleous (1990–2001)
- (Cyprus) Constantinos Charalambides (1997–2004, 2008–2016)
- (Cyprus) Zacharias Charalambous (2001–2005)
- (Cyprus) Andreas Christodoulou (1966–1970)
- (Cyprus) Georgios Christodoulou (1995–2002)
- (Cyprus) Costas Costa (1989–1999)
- (Cyprus) Costas Fasouliotis (1990–2000)
- (Cyprus) Demetris Daskalakis (2000–2008)
- (Cyprus) Marios Elia (1998–2014)
- (Cyprus) Stavros Georgiou (2002–2007)
- (Cyprus) Loukas Hadjiloukas (1987–2000)
- (Cyprus) Yiannos Ioannou (1981–2000)
- (Cyprus) Nikakis Kantzilieris (1961–1972)
- (Cyprus) Constantinos Makrides (2004–2008, 2015)
- (Cyprus) Costas Malekkos (2001–2005)
- (Cyprus) Markos Markou (1973–1978)
- (Cyprus) Costas Miamiliotis (1977–1989, 1992–1994)
- (Cyprus) Chrysis Michael (2003–2011)
- (Cyprus) Michalis Morfis (1999–2010)
- (Cyprus) Marios Neophytou (2004–2007)
- (Cyprus) Stelios Okkarides (1997–1998, 2001–2007)
- (Cyprus) Nikodimos Papavasiliou (2002–2003)
- (Cyprus) Giorgos Pantziaras (1971–1978, 1985–1987)
- (Cyprus) Nicos Pantziaras (1972–1987)
- (Cyprus) Koullis Pantziaras (1976–1992)
- (Cyprus) Andros Petrides (1984–2000)
- (Cyprus) Marinos Satsias (1995–2014)
- (Cyprus) Georgios Savva (1949–1955, 1956–1961)
- (Cyprus) Athos Solomou (2009–2014)
- (Cyprus) Andreas Sotiriou (1986–1998, 2001)
- (Cyprus) Andreas Stylianou (1963–1978)
- (Cyprus) Pieros Sotiriou (2013–2017)
- (Cyprus) Diomidis Symeonidis (1926–1929, 1934–1935)
- (Cyprus) Nicos Timotheou (1992–1993, 1994–2001)
- (Cyprus) Yiasoumis Yiasoumi (1998–2001)

Albania

- (Albania) Altin Haxhi (2008–2010)

Algeria

- (Algeria) Rafik Djebbour (2014–2015)

Argentina

- (Argentina) Fernando Cavenaghi (2015–2016)
- (Argentina) Esteban Solari (2005–2007, 2010–2012)
- (Argentina) Tomás De Vincenti (2014–2016)

Armenia

- (Armenia) Romik Khachatryan (2002–2003)

Australia

- (Australia) Paul Okon (2005–2006)

Austria

- (Austria) Alfred Hörtnagl (1997)
- (Austria) Christoph Westerthaler (1997)

Belarus

- (Belarus) (Brazil) Renan Bressan (2016–2017)

Bosnia and Herzegovina

- (Bosnia and Herzegovina) (France) Sanel Jahić

Brazil

- (Brazil) Aílton Almeida (2010–2012)
- (Brazil) William Boaventura (2010–2012)
- (Brazil) Carlão (2014–2017)
- (Brazil) Zé Carlos (2007–2008)
- (Brazil) João Guilherme (2013–2016)
- (Brazil) Kaká (2011–2012, 2014–2015)
- (Brazil) Gustavo Manduca (2010–2015)
- (Brazil) Veridiano Marcelo (1998–2000)
- (Brazil) Marcinho (2010–2012)
- (Brazil) Emerson Moisés Costa (2007)
- (Brazil) Marcelo Oliveira (2011–2014)
- (Brazil) Jean Paulista (2008–2010)
- (Brazil) César Santin (2014)
- (Brazil) Marcos Tavares (2007)

Colombia

- (Colombia) Hamilton Ricard (2004–2005)

Costa Rica

- (Costa Rica) Rónald Gómez (2006–2007)

Croatia

- (Croatia) Ardian Kozniku (1997)

Czech Republic

- (Czech Republic) Tomáš Votava (2003–2004)

Denmark

- (Denmark) Mikkel Beckmann (2013)

England

- (England) (Sierra Leone) Chris Bart-Williams (2004–2005)
- (England) Dave Esser (1982–1983)
- (England) Terry McDermott (1985–1987)
- (England) Ian Moores (1983–1988)
- (England) Gary Owen (1988–1989)

France

- (France) (Algeria) Bark Seghiri (2006–2009)

Germany

- (Germany) Martin Lanig (2015)

Ghana

- (Ghana) Ebenezer Hagan (2005)

Greece

- (Greece) Georgios Amanatidis (2003–2004)
- (Greece) Dionisis Chiotis (2008–2015)
- (Greece) Giannis Gianniotas (2016–2017)
- (Greece) Alexandros Kaklamanos (2005–2006)
- (Greece) Michalis Kapsis (2007–2008)
- (Greece) Christos Karipidis (2012–2013)
- (Greece) Christos Kontis (2006–2011)
- (Greece) Nikos Machlas (2006–2008)
- (Greece) Spiros Marangos (2000–2002)
- (Greece) Marinos Ouzounidis (2001–2003)
- (Greece) Anastasios Papazoglou (2014–2015)
- (Greece) (Cyprus) Savvas Poursaitides (2008–2012)
- (Greece) Miltiadis Sapanis (2007–2008)
- (Greece) Ilias Solakis (2001–2002)
- (Greece) Alexandros Tziolis (2012–2013)
- (Greece) Georgios Vakouftsis (2002–2005)

Hungary

- (Hungary) József Kiprich (1995–1997)
- (Hungary) Kálmán Kovács (1995–1996)
- (Hungary) István Kozma (1995–1997)
- (Hungary) Barnabás Sztipánovics (2002–2003)
- (Hungary) Roland Sallai (2017–2018)
- (Hungary) Norbert Balogh (2018–2019)

Ireland

- (Republic of Ireland) Cillian Sheridan (2013–2015)

Israel

- (Israel) Dudu Biton (2013)

Jordan

- (Jordan) Musa Al-Taamari (2018–2020)

North Macedonia

- (North Macedonia) Boban Grnčarov (2009–2011)
- (North Macedonia) Goran Lazarevski (2000–2001)
- (North Macedonia) Jane Nikolovski (2007–2008)
- (North Macedonia) Milan Stojanovski (2004–2005)
- (North Macedonia) Ivan Tričkovski (2010–2012)

Morocco

- (Morocco) Mohammed Chaouch (1999–2000)

Netherlands

- (Netherlands) Joost Broerse (2008–2011)
- (Netherlands) John van Loen (1998)

Nigeria

- (Nigeria) Michael Obiku (2000)
- (Nigeria) Benjamin Onwuachi (2008–2009)

Northern Ireland

- (Northern Ireland) Tommy Cassidy (1983–1985)

Norway

- (Norway) John Arne Riise (2014–2015)

Paraguay

- (Paraguay) Aldo Adorno (2011–2014)

Peru

- (Peru) Alfonso Dulanto (1997–1998)

Poland

- (Poland) Kamil Kosowski (2008–2010)
- (Poland) Wojciech Kowalczyk (2003–2004)
- (Poland) Marcin Żewłakow (2008–2010)

Portugal

- (Portugal) Paulo Costa (2009)
- (Portugal) Ricardo Fernandes (2005–2008)
- (Portugal) Tiago Gomes (2013–2015)
- (Portugal) Paulo Jorge (2009–2012)
- (Portugal) Daniel Kenedy (2005)
- (Portugal) Hélio Pinto (2006–2013)
- (Portugal) Mário Sérgio (2012–2016)

Romania

- (Romania) Daniel Florea (2006–2009)

Serbia

- (Serbia) Dragiša Binić (1993–1994)
- (Serbia) (Cyprus) Siniša Gogić (1989–1993, 2000–2002)
- (Serbia) Saša Jovanović (2005–2006)
- (Serbia) Vesko Mihajlović (1993–1994)
- (Serbia) Nenad Mirosavljević (2008–2011)
- (Serbia) Svetozar Šapurić (1989–1993, 1995–1996)

Slovakia

- (Slovakia) Mário Breška (2009–2010)
- (Slovakia) Branislav Rzeszoto (2004–2005)

Slovenia

- (Slovenia) Alfred Jermaniš (1996–1997)
- (Slovenia) Miran Pavlin (2004–2005)

Togo

- (Togo) Jean-Paul Abalo (2006)

Tunisia

- (Tunisia) Tijani Belaid (2011–2012)
- (Tunisia) (France) Selim Benachour (2012–2014)

== Honours ==
- Cypriot Championship
  - Winners (29) (record): 1935–36, 1936–37, 1937–38, 1938–39, 1939–40, 1946–47, 1947–48, 1948–49, 1951–52, 1964–65, 1972–73, 1979–80, 1985–86, 1989–90, 1991–92, 1995–96, 2001–02, 2003–04, 2006–07, 2008–09, 2010–11, 2012–13, 2013–14, 2014–15, 2015–16, 2016–17, 2017–18, 2018–19, 2023–24
- Cypriot Cup
  - Winners (21) (record): 1936–37, 1940–41, 1946–47, 1950–51, 1962–63, 1967–68, 1968–69, 1972–73, 1975–76, 1977–78, 1978–79, 1983–84, 1992–93, 1994–95, 1995–96, 1996–97, 1998–99, 2005–06, 2007–08, 2013–14, 2014–15
- Cypriot Super Cup
  - Winners (15): 1963, 1984, 1986, 1992, 1993, 1996, 1997, 2002, 2004, 2008, 2009, 2011, 2013, 2019, 2024

== Records ==
Last update: 16 March 2017

- Record League win: 17–1 vs (Cyprus) Aris Limassol (4 June 1967) — 1966–67
- Record League defeat: 6–1 vs (Cyprus) Nea Salamina (2 May 1998) — 1997–98
- Record European competition win: 6–0 vs (Norway) SK Gjøvik-Lyn (8 September 1963) — UEFA Cup Winners' Cup, Preliminary round 1st leg, 1963–64
  6–0 vs (Faroe Islands) HB Tórshavn (28 August 1997) — UEFA Cup Winners' Cup, Qualifying round 2nd leg, 1997–98
- Record European competition defeat: 16–1 vs (Portugal) Sporting CP (13 November 1963) — UEFA Cup Winners' Cup, 1st round 1st leg, 1963–64
- Most consecutive League games unbeaten: 34 — From 18 September 1946 to 23 November 1949
- Most consecutive League games won: 16 — From 21 December 2008 to 11 April 2009
- Most League points in a season:

3 for win: 83, 2015–16 (full season) — 69, 2008–09 (regular season)
2 for win: 51, 1976–77

- Most League goals in a season: 91, 2015–16
- Record average League home attendance: 9,582 — 2012–13
- Record League home attendance: 23,043 vs (Cyprus) Omonia (7 December 2002) — 2002–03
- Record European competition home attendance: 22,701 vs (France) Olympique Lyonnais (7 March 2012) — UEFA Champions League, Last-16 2nd leg, 2011–12
- Most League appearances for club: 371 — (Cyprus) Yiannos Ioannou
- Most League goals for club : 191 — (Cyprus) Yiannos Ioannou
- Most European competitions appearances for club: 91 — (Portugal) Nuno Morais
- Most European competitions goals for club : 9 — (Brazil) Aílton José Almeida

== League and Cup history ==
=== IFFHS Club world ranking ===
Rank	Country	Team	Points
273	(Sweden)	BK Häcken	76,00
274	(Turkey)	Alanyaspor	75,50
275	(Belgium)	Cercle Brugge	75,50
276	(Cyprus)	APOEL	75,25
277	(Moldova)	FC Sheriff	75,25
278	(Romania)	Universitatea Cluj	75
279	(Romania)	Universitatea Craiova	75

Last update: 7 July 2024
Source: IFFHS
