= Keravnos Strovolou FC =

Association football club based in Strovolos, Cyprus

Keravnos Strovolou FC (Greek: Κεραυνός Στροβόλου) was a Cypriot football club based in Strovolos, Nicosia. The team was part of the Keravnos B.C. sports club, which was founded in 1926. The parent club fields a men's Division A basketball team.

== Founding ==
The Men's football division was originally formed in 1926 when Aggelos Hadjiiosif, part of Keravnos B.C. sports club, approached an amateur football team called "Neolea"(Greek: Νεολέα). The team, formed by various school students from the Nicosia District, qualified for the finals of a league held in Lakatamia where amateur teams were participating. Mr. Hadjiiosif approached "Neolea"(Greek: Νεολέα) before the finals and made them an offer to appear at the finals as Keravnos Strovolou FC (Greek: Κεραυνός Στροβόλου), providing them with all the necessary equipment.

The offer was accepted and they re-branded themselves as Keravnos Strovolou FC (Greek: Κεραυνός Στροβόλου). They proceeded to emerge victorious in their first official match during that cup's finals.

== Founding Roster (Prev. "Neolea"(Greek: Νεολέα)) ==
- Sarris (GK)
- Dimos Kokkinos
- Tzoupras
- Kokis Hadjipavlou
- Peppis
- Lefteris Atsalides
- Pepis
- Tasos Louka
- Lefkos Savvides
- Iordanis
- Stelios (Half-Line)

== History ==
The team has had its ups and downs over the years, where it mostly featured in the second and third divisions. In 1979 the team advanced to the first division and remained there until 1982. In 1988–89 the football team advanced briefly to the first division again for one season but dropped back immediately. In 1991, the Club decided to suspend the football division indefinitely and to focus its efforts on developing the Basketball Teams.

== Honours ==
- Cypriot Second Division:
  - Champions (2): 1979, 1988
- Cypriot Third Division:
  - Champions (1): 1971
