= Parthenon Zodeia =

- Full name: Parthenon Zodeia Football Club
- Founded: 1966; 60 years ago
- League: Cypriot Second Division

Parthenon Zodeia (Greek: Παρθενών Ζώδιας), was a Cypriot football club based in Kato Zodeia. Founded in 1966, the team variously played in the Second and Third Divisions. Through 1979, the club played several seasons in the Second Division.

After the Turkish invasion of Cyprus and occupation of the city of Zodeia in 1974, the team was displaced to the southern part of the island, in Limassol. After some years the team dissolved due to financial problems.
