= 2016–17 Cypriot Futsal First Division =

Cypriot First Division
- Season: 2016–17

The 2016–17 season of the Cypriot Futsal First Division is the 18th season of top-tier futsal in Cyprus. The regular season started on September 22, 2016, and concluded in April 2017. The championship playoffs will follow the end of the regular season.

APOEL was the defending champions, winning its third title overall and in a row.

== Stadia and Locations ==
Locations of the 2016–17 Cypriot First Division teams.

== Regular season ==
=== Standings ===
Pos	Team	Pld	W	D	L	GF	GA	GD	Pts	Qualification or relegation
1	AEL Limassol	20	19	0	1	152	52	+100	57	Qualification to the championship playoffs
2	Anorthosis	20	17	0	3	120	39	+81	51	Qualification to the championship playoffs
3	APOEL	20	15	1	4	134	49	+85	46	Qualification to the championship playoffs
4	Omonia-Ararat	20	14	1	5	110	46	+64	43	Qualification to the championship playoffs
5	AEK Larnaca	20	11	0	9	68	60	+8	33	Qualification to the championship playoffs
6	AEK Sotira	20	8	2	10	95	123	−28	26	Qualification to the championship playoffs
7	AMEK Kapsalou	20	6	2	12	51	83	−32	20	Qualification to the championship playoffs
8	Elpida	20	5	1	14	52	97	−45	16	Qualification to the championship playoffs
9	Deryneia	20	4	3	13	61	116	−55	15	
10	Apeleutherosi	20	3	0	17	40	154	−114	9	
11	Ethnikos	20	3	0	17	56	120	−64	9	

Source: CFA
Rules for classification: 1) Points; 2) Head-to-head points; 3) Head-to-head goal difference; 4) Head-to-head goals scored; 5) Head-to-head away goals scored (only if two teams); 6) Goal difference; 7) Goals scored; 8) Play-off (only if deciding championship round, relegation round or relegation).

=== Results ===
Home \ Away	AEK	SOT	AEL	AME	APE	APO	ANO	DER	ELP	ETH	OMO
AEK Larnaca		6–1	2–4	4–2	3–6	0–4	0–4	9–2	4–3	5–1	2–1
AEK Sotira	10–4		8–11	5–3	14–7	2–6	1–12	6–3	7–4	7–4	2–6
AEL Limassol	8–2	11–1		4–2	4–0	6–3	7–6	7–1	8–1	10–2	6–4
AMEK Kapsalou	2–0	4–2	2–6		4–0	1–6	0–2	3–5	2–1	2–8	2–2
Apeleutherosi	3–6	4–9	0–10	1–10		3–18	1–11	3–2	2–5	4–2	1–8
APOEL	3–2	9–4	4–8	11–0	13–0		9–3	11–4	7–3	6–2	3–2
Anorthosis	3–0	12–0	6–5	7–0	7–1	3–2		5–2	6–0	8–1	1–4
Deryneia	1–4	4–4	1–11	3–3	7–1	2–2	1–7		3–6	7–4	1–13
Elpida Astromeriti	1–3	3–3	0–11	5–2	2–4	1–8	0–4	6–3		7–4	1–10
Ethnikos Latsion	1–5	3–4	5–9	3–5	5–3	1–8	1–8	2–6	4–2		1–7
Omonia-Ararat	4–1	7–5	2–6	8–2	8–0	2–1	4–5	9–3	2–1	7–2	

Updated to match(es) played on unknown. Source: Cyprus Football Association
Legend: Blue = home team win; Yellow = draw; Red = away team win.

== Playoffs ==
=== Bracket ===
Quarter-finals
1	AEL Limassol	2
8	Elpida	0
4	Omonia-Ararat	2
5	AEK Larnaca	1
2	Anorthosis	2
7	AMEK	0
3	APOEL	2
6	AEK Sotira	0

Semi-finals
1	AEL Limassol	1
4	Omonia-Ararat	2
2	Anorthosis	1
3	APOEL	2

Final
4	Omonia-Ararat	2
3	APOEL	9

=== Quarter-finals ===
Team 1	Agg.	Team 2	Game 1	Game 2	Game 3
AEL Limassol	2–0	Elpida Astromeriti	8–1	10–2	
Omonia-Ararat	2–1	AEK Larnaca	0–3	3–2	6–0
Anorthosis	2–0	AMEK Kapsalou	7–0	10–2	
APOEL	2–0	AEK Sotira	6–1	9–3	

==== Game 1 ====
31 March 2017	AEL Limassol	8–1	Elpida Astromeriti	Spyros Kyprianou
20:50 EEST	Rifki 15'; Lopes 18', 31'; Tsakanias 18', 21'; Martins 20'; Hadjigeorgiou 22'; Zantis 27'	Report	Hatzidakis 16'

29 March 2017	Omonia-Ararat	0–3	AEK Larnaca	Eleftheria Indoor Hall
20:30 EEST		Report	Livadiotis 17'; Toumazis 23'; Vagner 24'

30 March 2017	Anorthosis	7–0	AMEK Kapsalou	Kition Athletic Center
20:00 EEST	Felipe 4', 12', 31'; Kokkinos 7'; Kouppari 18'; Bueno 30'; Rodrigo 39'	Report

30 March 2017	APOEL	6–1	AEK Sotira	Lefkotheo
19:00 EEST	Omirou 12', 38'; Leandro 26'; Plati 33', 35'; Iakovou 40'	Report	Dimitriou 39'

==== Game 2 ====
3 April 2017	Elpida Astromeriti	2–10	AEL Limassol	Lefkotheo
20:30 EEST	Hadjivasili 1', 29'	Report	Fabio 4', 14', 15', 28', 34', 37'; Hadjigeorgiou 13'; Martins 23', 36'; Zantis 33'

3 April 2017	AEK Larnaca	2–3	Omonia-Ararat	Kition Athletic Center
20:00 EEST	Muntean 24'; Livadiotis 28'	Report	Manoli 32'; Kravtsov 34', 39'

3 April 2017	AMEK Kapsalou	2–10	Anorthosis	Kition Athletic Center
21:15 EEST	Sokratous 6'; Andreou 31'	Report	Chari 8', 20'; Kouppari 15'; Felipe 16', 39'; Panagiotou 25' (o.g.); Kouloumpris 32', 34'; Rodrigo 35'; Sokratous 37' (o.g.)}

3 April 2017	AEK Sotira	3–9	APOEL	Sotira
20:00 EEST	Pereira 16'; Moushis 19'; Araujo 34'	Report	Magno 7'; Stilianou 8'; Iakovou 17', 34', 40'; Alexiou 19'; Carrasco 30', 37'; Perikleous 39'

==== Game 3 ====
6 April 2017	Omonia-Ararat	6–0	AEK Larnaca	Eleftheria Indoor Hall
20:30 EEST	Papadopoulos 8', 31'; Pereira 9'; Andreou 14'; Ioannou 25'; Skarparis 37'	Report	Livadiotis 17'; Toumazis 23'; Vagner 24'

=== Semi-finals ===
Team 1	Agg.	Team 2	Game 1	Game 2	Game 3
AEL Limassol	1–2	Omonia-Ararat	3–2	3–8	5–6
Anorthosis	0–1	APOEL	1–3	3–1	–

==== Game 1 ====
10 April 2017	AEL Limassol	3–2	Omonia-Ararat	Spyros Kyprianou
20:50 EEST	Martins 3'; Stergiopoulos 25'; Aguiar 35'	Report	Skarparis 10'; Pereira 39'

10 April 2017	Anorthosis	1–3	APOEL	Kition Athletic Center
20:00 EEST	Costa 4'	Report	Perikleous 15'; Magno 37'; Leandro 39'

==== Game 2 ====
20 April 2017	Omonia-Ararat	8–3	AEL Limassol	Eleftheria Indoor Hall
20:00 EEST	Skarparis 14', 32'; Kravtsov 32', 33', 34', 36', 38', 39'; Cesar 40'	Report	Aguiar 3'; Ronald 30'; Tsakanias 38'

24 April 2017	APOEL	1–3	Anorthosis	Lefkotheo
EEST

==== Game 3 ====
24 April 2017	AEL Limassol	5–6	Omonia-Ararat	Spyros Kyprianou
EEST	Aguiar 4'; Ronald 5'; Carvalho 23'; Tsakanias 27'; Martins 32'	Report	Kravtsov 3', 26'; Skarparis 6'; Cesar 12'; Lakoufis 13'; Manoli 21'

28 April 2017	Anorthosis	v	APOEL	Kition Athletic Center
20:00 EEST

== See also ==
- 2016–17 Cypriot Futsal Cup
