= 2016–17 Cypriot Futsal Cup =

Tournament details
- Country: Cyprus
- Dates: 23 October 2016 – 12 May 2017
- Teams: 11

Final positions
- Champions: AEL Limassol (1st title)
- Runners-up: Omonia–Ararat

Tournament statistics
- Matches played: 12
- Goals scored: 107 (8.92 per match)

The 2016–17 season of the Cypriot Futsal Cup is the 18th season of top-tier futsal in Cyprus. The regular season started on October 23, 2016, and will conclude in April 2017. The championship playoffs will follow the end of the regular season.

APOEL was the defending champions, winning its third title overall and in a row.

== Bracket ==
First round
AMEK Kapsalou	4
Apeleutherosi	1
AEL Limassol	5
Ethnikos Latsion	2
AEK Sotira	5
Omonia-Ararat	8

Quarter-finals
APOEL	11
Anorthosis	12 (p)
AMEK Kapsalou	0
AEL Limassol	7
Omonia-Ararat	4
Deryneia	0
Elpida Astromeriti	4
AEK Larnaca	5

Semi-finals
Anorthosis	5
AEL Limassol	15
Omonia-Ararat	7
AEK Larnaca	5

Final
AEL Limassol	8
Omonia-Ararat	4

== First round ==
The first round draw took place on 19 October 2016 and the matches played on 23 and 24 October.

23 October 2016	AMEK Kapsalou	4–1	Apeleutherosi	Spyros Kyprianou, Limassol
19:30 EET	Sokratous 14', 25'; Kosti 15'; Panagiotou 16'	Report	Vasiliadis 5'	Referee: Michalis Christofidis

24 October 2016	AEK Sotira	5–8	Omonia-Ararat	Sotira
20:00 EET	Georgiou 13', 27'; Tomin 13', 22'; Stankovic 20'	Report	Cesar 5', 7', 23'; Iakovou 10'; Diogo 15', 30'; Papadopoulos 22'; Andreou 30'	Referee: Marios Ioannou

24 October 2016	AEL Limassol	5–2	Ethnikos Latsion	Spyros Kyprianou, Limassol
20:45 EET	Martins 2'; Tsakanias 3', 13'; Ronald 12'; Aguiar 33'	Report	Vasiliou 19'; Filippou 23'	Referee: Christos Chritsou

== Quarter-finals ==
The Quarter-finals draw took place on 17 November 2016 and the matches played on 28 and 29 November.

28 November 2016	APOEL	9–9 (a.e.t.) (11–12 p)	Anorthosis	Lefkotheo, Nicosia
20:00 EET	Carrasco 6', 31'; Araujo 7'; Stilianou 9'; Quardos 14', 33'; Nascimento 29', 43', 45'	Report	Kouloumpris 3', 15', 33', 39', 45', 48'; Bueno 11'; Christofi 32'; Vagner 35'	Referee: Kostas Nikolaou

28 November 2016	Elpida Astromeriti	4–5	AEK Larnaca	Eleftheria Indoor Hall, Nicosia
21:15 EET	Hatzidakis 4'; Darkwa 19', 28', 34'	Report	Livadiotis 28', 29', 38'; Toumazis 39', 39'	Referee: Iraklis Irakleous

28 November 2016	AMEK Kapsalou	0–7	AEL Limassol	Spyros Kyprianou, Limassol
21:15 EET		Report	Martins 9', 17'; Ronald 18'; Hadjigeorgiou 22', 30'; Tsakanias 28'; Kanjo 23'	Referee: Michalis Christophides

29 November 2016	Omonia-Ararat	4–0	Deryneia	Eleftheria Indoor Hall, Nicosia
20:30 EET	Iakovou 16', 29'; Andreou 27'; Cesar 30'	Report		Referee: Nikolas Nikolaou

== Semi-finals ==
The Semi-finals draw took place on 4 January 2017 and the first leg matches played on 16 January and the second leg on 27 March.

=== First leg ===
16 January 2017	Omonia-Ararat	2–1	AEK Larnaca	Eleftheria Indoor Hall, Nicosia
20:00 EET	Kravtsov 2', 30'	Report	Muntean 8'	Referee: Stavros Hadjipanagi

16 January 2017	Anorthosis	1–11	AEL Limassol	Kition Athletic Center, Larnaca
20:00 EET	Kouppari 11'	Report	Ronald 10', 20'; Martins 11', 12'; Perikleous 14'; Hadjigeorgiou 18', 29'; Aguiar 19', 21'; Kanjo 24'; Lopes 26'	Referee: Michalis Christophides

=== Second leg ===
27 March 2017	AEK Larnaca	4–5 (5–7 agg.)	Omonia-Ararat	Kition Athletic Center, Larnaca
20:00 EET	Toumazis 18', 29'; Cesar 21' (o.g.); Vagner 30'	Report	Andreou 14', 27'; Kravtsov 19', 25'; Manoli 28'	Referee: Kostas Nikolaou

27 March 2017	AEL Limassol	4–4 (15–5 agg.)	Anorthosis	Spyros Kyprianou, Limassol
20:00 EET	Ronald 19'; Lopes 21', 26'; Aguiar 23'	Report	Rodrigo 24', 25', 29'; Kokkinos 27'	Referee: Michalis Christophides

== Final ==
12 May 2017
20:00 EEST

AEL Limassol	8–4	Omonia-Ararat
Lopes 1', 7', 25'; Aguiar 2', 25', 26'; Silva 3', 27'	Report	Andreou 6'; Ioannou 21', 28'; Kravtsov 28'

Kition Athletic Center, Larnaca
Referee: Michalis Christofides

== See also ==
- 2016–17 Cypriot Futsal First Division
