= Cyprus national futsal team =

Cyprus
- Association: Cyprus Football Association
- Confederation: UEFA (Europe)
- Head coach: Athos Stylianou
- FIFA code: CYP
- FIFA ranking: 96 ▼3 (8 May 2026)
| Home colours | Away colours |

First international
- Finland 3–2 Cyprus (Leek, Netherlands; December 14, 1998)

Biggest win
- Cyprus 10–0 Lebanon (Nicosia, Cyprus; April 15, 2003)

Biggest defeat
- Ukraine 17–1 Cyprus (Lučenec, Slovakia; November 6, 2002)

FIFA World Cup
- Appearances: 0

UEFA Futsal Championship
- Appearances: 0

The Cyprus national futsal team is controlled by the Cyprus Football Association, the governing body for futsal in Cyprus and represents the country in international futsal competitions, such as the World Cup and the European Championships.

== Competition history ==
=== FIFA Futsal World Cup ===
- 1989 - did not compete
- 1992 - did not compete
- 1996 - did not compete
- 2000 - did not compete
- 2004 - did not qualify
- 2008 - did not qualify
- 2012 - did not qualify
- 2016 - did not qualify
- 2021 - did not qualify
- 2024 - did not qualify

=== UEFA Futsal Championship ===
- 1996 - did not compete
- 1999 - did not qualify
- 2001 - did not compete
- 2003 - did not qualify
- 2005 - did not qualify
- 2007 - did not qualify
- 2010 - did not qualify
- 2012 - did not qualify
- 2014 - did not qualify
- 2016 - did not qualify
- 2018 - did not qualify
- 2022 – did not qualify
- 2026 – did not qualify

== Players ==
=== Current squad ===
The following players were called up to the squad for the 2028 FIFA Futsal World Cup qualifying matches against Albania, Latvia and San Marino on 9, 10 and 12 April 2026 respectively.

| No. | Pos. | Player | Date of birth (age) | Caps | Goals | Club |
|---|---|---|---|---|---|---|
| 1 | GK | Marios Christoforou | 13 April 1994 (age 32) | | | (Cyprus Football Association) AEK Larnaca |
| 12 | GK | Kyriacos Stylianou | 11 May 1997 (age 29) | | | (Cyprus Football Association) Omonia Futsal |
| 2 | DF | Giorgos Krekos | 15 August 1995 (age 30) | | | (Cyprus Football Association) AEL Limassol |
| 4 | DF | Christos Stylianou | 7 August 1990 (age 35) | | | (Cyprus Football Association) AEK Larnaca |
| 5 | DF | Iosif Iosif | 6 August 1998 (age 27) | | | (Cyprus Football Association) Apollon Limassol |
| 6 | DF | Konstantinos Exadactylos | 12 November 2001 (age 24) | | | (Cyprus Football Association) APOEL Futsal |
| 7 | DF | Gevara Kanjo | 19 May 1996 (age 30) | | | (Cyprus Football Association) AEL Limassol |
| 8 | DF | Chrysostomos Papaspyrou | 23 November 1993 (age 32) | | | (Cyprus Football Association) AEK Larnaca |
| 14 | DF | Alexandros Georgiou | 1 September 2004 (age 21) | | | (Cyprus Football Association) AEK Larnaca |
| 3 | FW | Nikos Chadjigeorgiou | 14 May 1988 (age 38) | | | (Cyprus Football Association) AEL Limassol |
| 9 | FW | Alexis Tsitsos | 4 February 2000 (age 26) | | | (Cyprus Football Association) Omonia Futsal |
| 10 | FW | Konstantinos Kouloumbris (captain) | 15 June 1990 (age 36) | | | (Cyprus Football Association) APOEL Futsal |
| 11 | FW | Charis Koulloupas | 2 February 2000 (age 26) | | | (Cyprus Football Association) Omonia Futsal |
| 13 | FW | Andreas Savva | 21 March 1990 (age 36) | | | (Cyprus Football Association) Omonia Futsal |

=== Recent call-ups ===
The following players have also been called up to the squad within the last 12 months.

| Pos. | Player | Date of birth (age) | Caps | Goals | Club | Latest call-up |
|---|---|---|---|---|---|---|
| GK | Paraskevas Psilogenis^{INJ} | 2 June 1990 (age 36) | | | (Cyprus) APOEL Futsal | v. Montenegro, 29 January 2026 |
| DF | Christos Marios Kitsiou | 12 November 2001 (age 24) | | | (Cyprus) AEK Larnaca | v. Montenegro, 29 January 2026 |
| DF | Ioannis Loukas | 10 December 2003 (age 22) | | | (Cyprus) APOEL Futsal | v. Montenegro, 29 January 2026 |
| DF | Giorgos Skampylis | 5 December 2008 (age 17) | | | (Cyprus) Omonia Futsal | v. Montenegro, 29 January 2026 |
| FW | Taha El Kebbe | 18 February 2000 (age 26) | | | (Cyprus) AEL Limassol | v. Montenegro, 29 January 2026 |
| FW | Panagiotis Fattas | 30 November 2001 (age 24) | | | (Cyprus) APOEL Futsal | v. Montenegro, 29 January 2026 |
| FW | Vram Nalbandian | | | | (Cyprus) AGBU Ararat | v. Montenegro, 29 January 2026 |
^{INJ} Player withdrew from the squad due to an injury.^{PRE} Preliminary squad.^{RET} Retired from international futsal.
