= 1996–97 Cypriot Cup =

Tournament details
- Country: Cyprus
- Dates: 9 November 1996 – 17 May 1997
- Teams: 50

Final positions
- Champions: APOEL (16th title)

The 1996–97 Cypriot Cup was the 55th edition of the Cypriot Cup. A total of 50 clubs entered the competition. It began on 9 November 1996 with the preliminary round and concluded on 17 May 1997 with the final which was held at Makario Stadium. APOEL won their 16th Cypriot Cup trophy after beating Omonia 2–0 in the final.

== Format ==
In the 1996–97 Cypriot Cup, participated all the teams of the Cypriot First Division, the Cypriot Second Division, the Cypriot Third Division and 9 of the 14 teams of the Cypriot Fourth Division.

The competition consisted of six knock-out rounds. In the preliminary round and in the first round each tie was played as a single leg and was held at the home ground of one of the two teams, according to the draw results. Each tie winner was qualifying to the next round. If a match was drawn, extra time was following. If extra time was drawn, there was a replay at the ground of the team who were away for the first game. If the rematch was also drawn, then extra time was following and if the match remained drawn after extra time the winner was decided by penalty shoot-out.

The next three rounds were played in a two-legged format, each team playing a home and an away match against their opponent. The team which scored more goals on aggregate, was qualifying to the next round. If the two teams scored the same number of goals on aggregate, then the team which scored more goals away from home was advancing to the next round.

If both teams had scored the same number of home and away goals, then extra time was following after the end of the second leg match. If during the extra thirty minutes both teams had managed to score, but they had scored the same number of goals, then the team who scored the away goals was advancing to the next round (i.e. the team which was playing away). If there weren't scored any goals during extra time, the qualifying team was determined by penalty shoot-out.

The cup winner secured a place in the 1997–98 UEFA Cup Winners' Cup.

== Ρreliminary round ==
All the 14 clubs of the Cypriot Second Division, all the 13 clubs of the Cypriot Third Division and 9 clubs from the Cypriot Fourth Division (first nine of the league table the day of draw) participated in the preliminary round.

Team 1	Score	Team 2
Achyronas Liopetriou (B)	7–0	Ethnikos Latsion (C)
Adonis Idaliou (D)	1–3	ASIL Lysi (C)
AEZ Zakakiou (B)	1–3	AEL Limassol (B)
AMEK Kapsalou (D)	3–1	AEK Katholiki (C)
APEP Pelendriou (C)	6–1	Ayia Napa F.C. (C)
Apollon Lympion (D)	3–1	Doxa Paliometochou (D)
Doxa Katokopias F.C. (B)	0–1	Chalkanoras Idaliou (B)
ENTHOI Lakatamia FC (C)	1–2	Akritas Chlorakas (B)
Elia Lythrodonta (C)	1–2	Anagennisi Germasogeias (C)
Ellinismos Akakiou (D)	0–7	AEK Kakopetrias (B)
Ethnikos Assia F.C. (B)	1–2	Achilleas Ayiou Theraponta (D)
Evagoras Paphos (B)	3–1	Ermis Aradippou (B)
Iraklis Gerolakkou (C)	2–0	Enosis Kokkinotrimithia (D)
Kinyras Empas (C)	0–1	Digenis Akritas Morphou (B)
MEAP Nisou (D)	1–2	Poseidonas Giolou (D)
Onisilos Sotira (B)	0–1	Othellos Athienou F.C. (C)
Orfeas Nicosia (C)	0–3	PAEEK FC (B)
Rotsidis Mammari (C)	4–0	Omonia Aradippou (B)

== First round ==
The 14 clubs of the Cypriot First Division advanced directly to the first round and met the winners of the preliminary round ties:

Team 1	Score	Team 2
AEK Kakopetrias (B)	0–3	AEL Limassol (B)
AEK Larnaca F.C. (A)	2–0	Achyronas Liopetriou (B)
Alki Larnaca F.C. (A)	3–1 (a.e.t.)	Akritas Chlorakas (B)
AMEK Kapsalou (D)	1–4	Aris Limassol F.C. (A)
Anagennisi Germasogeias (C)	0–2	Enosis Neon Paralimni FC (A)
APEP Pelendriou (C)	0–2	APOP Paphos (A)
APOEL FC (A)	8–0	PAEEK FC (B)
Apollon Limassol (A)	6–0	Iraklis Gerolakkou (C)
Apollon Lympion (D)	2–0	Achilleas Ayiou Theraponta (D)
ASIL Lysi (C)	0–3	Olympiakos Nicosia (A)
Chalkanoras Idaliou (B)	2–3	Anagennisi Deryneia (A)
Digenis Akritas Morphou (B)	1–2	Ethnikos Achna FC (A)
Evagoras Paphos (B)	1–0	APEP F.C. (A)
Nea Salamis Famagusta FC (A)	5–0	Rotsidis Mammari (C)
AC Omonia (A)	6–0	Othellos Athienou F.C. (C)
Poseidonas Giolou (D)	1–2	Anorthosis Famagusta FC (A)

== Second round ==
Team 1	Agg.	Team 2	1st leg	2nd leg
AEL Limassol (B)	2–2 (a)	APOP Paphos (A)	2–1	0–1
Alki Larnaca F.C. (A)	3–3 (1–3 p)	Nea Salamis Famagusta FC (A)	2–1	1–2
Anagennisi Deryneia (A)	3–4	Enosis Neon Paralimni FC (A)	1–3	2–1
Apollon Limassol (A)	2–2 (a)	Anorthosis Famagusta FC (A)	2–2	0–0
Aris Limassol F.C. (A)	3–5	APOEL FC (A)	2–1	1–4
Evagoras Paphos (B)	1–6	Ethnikos Achna FC (A)	1–5	0–1
Olympiakos Nicosia (A)	1–5	AEK Larnaca F.C. (A)	0–2	1–3
AC Omonia (A)	15–3	Apollon Lympion (D)	8–2	7–1

== Quarter-finals ==
Team 1	Agg.	Team 2	1st leg	2nd leg
AEK Larnaca F.C. (A)	4–1	APOP Paphos (A)	3–0	1–1
Anorthosis Famagusta FC (A)	2–1	Enosis Neon Paralimni FC (A)	1–1	1–0
Nea Salamis Famagusta FC (A)	2–6	APOEL FC (A)	1–2	1–4
AC Omonia (A)	3–3 (a)	Ethnikos Achna FC (A)	1–1	2–2

== Semi-finals ==
Team 1	Agg.	Team 2	1st leg	2nd leg
Anorthosis Famagusta FC (A)	3–4	APOEL FC (A)	2–1	1–3 (a.e.t.)
AC Omonia (A)	2–0	AEK Larnaca F.C. (A)	1–0	1–0

== Final ==
17 May 1997

APOEL	2–0	Omonia
Fasouliotis 87'; Sotiriou 90'

Makario Stadium, Nicosia
Attendance: 20,000
Referee: Andreas Georgiou

Cypriot Cup 1996–97 Winners
APOEL
16th title

== Sources ==
- "1996/97 Cyprus Cup". Rec.Sport.Soccer Statistics Foundation. 2016-01-14.

== See also ==
- Cypriot Cup
- 1996–97 Cypriot First Division
