= 1995–96 Cypriot Cup =

Tournament details
- Country: Cyprus
- Dates: 11 November 1995 – 29 May 1996
- Teams: 50

Final positions
- Champions: APOEL (15th title)

The 1995–96 Cypriot Cup was the 54th edition of the Cypriot Cup. A total of 50 clubs entered the competition. It began on 11 November 1995 with the preliminary round and concluded on 29 May 1996 with the final which was held at Tsirion Stadium. APOEL won their 15th Cypriot Cup trophy after beating AEK 2–0 in the final after extra time.

== Format ==
In the 1995–96 Cypriot Cup, participated all the teams of the Cypriot First Division, the Cypriot Second Division, the Cypriot Third Division and 8 of the 15 teams of the Cypriot Fourth Division.

The competition consisted of six knock-out rounds. In the preliminary round and in the first round each tie was played as a single leg and was held at the home ground of one of the two teams, according to the draw results. Each tie winner was qualifying to the next round. If a match was drawn, extra time was following. If extra time was drawn, there was a replay at the ground of the team who were away for the first game. If the rematch was also drawn, then extra time was following and if the match remained drawn after extra time the winner was decided by penalty shoot-out.

The next three rounds were played in a two-legged format, each team playing a home and an away match against their opponent. The team which scored more goals on aggregate, was qualifying to the next round. If the two teams scored the same number of goals on aggregate, then the team which scored more goals away from home was advancing to the next round.

If both teams had scored the same number of home and away goals, then extra time was following after the end of the second leg match. If during the extra thirty minutes both teams had managed to score, but they had scored the same number of goals, then the team who scored the away goals was advancing to the next round (i.e. the team which was playing away). If there weren't scored any goals during extra time, the qualifying team was determined by penalty shoot-out.

The cup winner secured a place in the 1996–97 UEFA Cup Winners' Cup.

== Ρreliminary round ==
All the 14 clubs of the Cypriot Second Division, all the 14 clubs of the Cypriot Third Division and 8 clubs from the Cypriot Fourth Division (first eight of the league table the day of draw) participated in the preliminary round.

Team 1	Score	Team 2
Ayia Napa F.C. (B)	1–0	Akritas Chlorakas (B)
Achilleas Ayiou Theraponta (D)	2–4 (a.e.t.)	AEK Kakopetrias (C)
Adonis Idaliou (D)	1–2	PAEEK FC (B)
AEK Katholiki (C)	2–3 (a.e.t.)	Fotiakos Frenarou (C)
AEZ Zakakiou (B)	4–0	Iraklis Gerolakkou (D)
Anagennisi Deryneia (B)	3–0	Anagennisi Germasogeias (C)
APEP Pelendriou (C)	1–0	AMEK Kapsalou (D)
ASIL Lysi (D)	1–0	Doxa Paliometochou (D)
Chalkanoras Idaliou (B)	1–2	APOP Paphos (B)
Digenis Oroklinis (C)	0–2	Digenis Akritas Morphou (B)
ENTHOI Lakatamia FC (C)	1–1, 0–1	Ermis Aradippou (C)
Elia Lythrodonta (C)	0–2	Onisilos Sotira (B)
Ethnikos Assia F.C. (B)	2–1	Doxa Katokopias F.C. (B)
MEAP Nisou (D)	3–4	Achyronas Liopetriou (C)
Orfeas Nicosia (C)	1–2	Kinyras Empas (D)
Othellos Athienou F.C. (B)	1–4	APEP F.C. (B)
Rotsidis Mammari (C)	0–2	Ethnikos Latsion (B)
Tsaggaris Peledriou (C)	2–1	Digenis Akritas Ipsona (C)

== First round ==
The 14 clubs of the Cypriot First Division advanced directly to the first round and met the winners of the preliminary round ties:

Team 1	Score	Team 2
Achyronas Liopetriou (C)	0–3	AEL Limassol (A)
AEK Kakopetrias (C)	0–8	AEK Larnaca F.C. (A)
AEZ Zakakiou (B)	1–2	PAEEK FC (B)
Alki Larnaca F.C. (A)	4–0	Digenis Akritas Morphou (B)
Anagennisi Deryneia (B)	0–2	Ayia Napa F.C. (B)
Anorthosis Famagusta FC (A)	4–0	Ethnikos Assia F.C. (B)
APEP Pelendriou (C)	0–4	Enosis Neon Paralimni FC (A)
APEP F.C. (B)	0–1	APOEL FC (A)
Apollon Limassol (A)	1–0	Onisilos Sotira (B)
ASIL Lysi (D)	1–2	Aris Limassol F.C. (A)
Ermis Aradippou (C)	2–3	Evagoras Paphos (A)
Ethnikos Latsion (B)	0–1	Omonia Aradippou (A)
Kinyras Empas (D)	0–2	Ethnikos Achna FC (A)
Nea Salamis Famagusta FC (A)	1–0	APOP Paphos (B)
Olympiakos Nicosia (A)	4–1	Fotiakos Frenarou (C)
Tsaggaris Peledriou (C)	0–1	AC Omonia (A)

== Second round ==
Team 1	Agg.	Team 2	1st leg	2nd leg
Ayia Napa F.C. (B)	2–6	AC Omonia (A)	0–4	2–2
AEK Larnaca F.C. (A)	2–1	Alki Larnaca F.C. (A)	1–0	1–1
APOEL FC (A)	8–4	AEL Limassol (A)	4–1	4–3
Enosis Neon Paralimni FC (A)	2–4	Apollon Limassol (A)	0–1	2–3
Ethnikos Achna FC (A)	3–5	Anorthosis Famagusta FC (A)	3–1	0–4
Olympiakos Nicosia (A)	3–1	Evagoras Paphos (A)	2–1	1–0
Omonia Aradippou (A)	4–2	Aris Limassol F.C. (A)	2–1	2–1
PAEEK FC (B)	0–4	Nea Salamis Famagusta FC (A)	0–3	0–1

== Quarter-finals ==
Team 1	Agg.	Team 2	1st leg	2nd leg
AEK Larnaca F.C. (A)	7–1	Omonia Aradippou (A)	7–0	0–1
Apollon Limassol (A)	2–0	Anorthosis Famagusta FC (A)	1–0	1–0
Nea Salamis Famagusta FC (A)	2–3	APOEL FC (A)	1–1	1–2
Olympiakos Nicosia (A)	3–4	AC Omonia (A)	1–2	2–2

== Semi-finals ==
Team 1	Agg.	Team 2	1st leg	2nd leg
APOEL FC (A)	3–2	AC Omonia (A)	1–2	2–0
Apollon Limassol (A)	3–3 (a)	AEK Larnaca F.C. (A)	2–2	1–1

== Final ==
29 May 1996

APOEL	2–0 (a.e.t.)	AEK Larnaca
Kiprich 93'; Alexandrou 117'

Tsirion Stadium, Limassol

Cypriot Cup 1995–96 Winners
APOEL
15th title

== Sources ==
- "1995/96 Cyprus Cup". Rec.Sport.Soccer Statistics Foundation. 2016-01-14.

== See also ==
- Cypriot Cup
- 1995–96 Cypriot First Division
