= 1996–97 Cypriot Third Division =

Cypriot Third Division
- Season: 1996–97
- Champions: Rotsidis (1st title)
- Promoted: Rotsidis; Iraklis G. ASIL
- Relegated: Orfeas; AEK Katholiki; Tsaggaris
- Matches played: 182
- Goals scored: 482 (2.65 per match)

The 1996–97 Cypriot Third Division was the 26th season of the Cypriot third-level football league. Rotsidis Mammari won their 1st title.

== Format ==
Fourteen teams participated in the 1996–97 Cypriot Third Division. All teams played against each other twice, once at their home and once away. The team with the most points at the end of the season crowned champions. The first three teams were promoted to the 1997–98 Cypriot Second Division and the last three teams were relegated to the 1997–98 Cypriot Fourth Division.

=== Point system ===
Teams received three points for a win, one point for a draw and zero points for a loss.

== Changes from previous season ==
Teams promoted to 1996–97 Cypriot Second Division

- Ermis Aradippou
- Achyronas Liopetriou
- AEK Kakopetrias

Teams relegated from 1995–96 Cypriot Second Division

- Ethnikos Latsion FC
- Othellos Athienou
- Ayia Napa

Teams promoted from 1995–96 Cypriot Fourth Division

- Iraklis Gerolakkou
- ASIL Lysi
- Kinyras Empas

Teams relegated to 1996–97 Cypriot Fourth Division

- Digenis Oroklinis
- Digenis Akritas Ipsona
- Fotiakos Frenarou

== League standings ==
Pos	Team	Pld	W	D	L	GF	GA	GD	Pts	Promotion or relegation
1	Rotsidis Mammari (C, P)	26	18	5	3	54	24	+30	59	Promoted to Cypriot Second Division
2	Iraklis Gerolakkou (P)	26	15	4	7	45	28	+17	49	Promoted to Cypriot Second Division
3	ASIL Lysi (P)	26	13	8	5	33	18	+15	47	Promoted to Cypriot Second Division
4	Ayia Napa	26	14	4	8	47	32	+15	46	
5	Kinyras Empas	26	11	10	5	29	17	+12	43	
6	Othellos Athienou	26	12	3	11	41	35	+6	39	
7	Anagennisi Germasogeias	26	10	6	10	39	32	+7	36	
8	THOI Lakatamia	26	10	5	11	31	31	0	35	
9	Elia Lythrodonta	26	9	8	9	31	34	−3	35	
10	Ethnikos Latsion FC	26	9	7	10	37	38	−1	34	
11	APEP Pelendriou	26	9	7	10	28	30	−2	34	
12	Orfeas Nicosia (R)	26	8	5	13	32	56	−24	29	Relegated to Cypriot Fourth Division
13	AEK Katholiki (R)	26	6	4	16	35	55	−20	22	Relegated to Cypriot Fourth Division
14	Tsaggaris Peledriou (Note: Tsaggaris Peledriou withdrew before the start of the season; all their matches were awarded 2–0 to their opponents.) (R)	26	0	0	26	0	52	−52	0	Relegated to Cypriot Fourth Division

Rules for classification: 1) Points, 2) Goal differences, 3) Goals for.
(C) Champions; (P) Promoted; (R) Relegated

== Results ==
Home \ Away	AEK	APP	ASL	ANG	ANP	THL	ELL	ETL	IRK	KIN	ORF	OTL	RTS	TSG (Note: Tsaggaris Peledriou withdrew before the start of the season; all their matches were awarded 2–0 to their opponents.)
AEK		0–0	0–0	0–2	3–4	1–4	1–2	2–3	1–2	1–2	1–2	4–0	4–3	2–0
APEP	2–0		2–2	1–0	3–0	1–0	1–0	1–2	1–0	0–0	3–0	4–4	0–0	2–0
ASIL	2–1	1–0		2–0	1–1	0–0	2–2	0–0	3–0	1–0	4–2	2–1	1–0	2–0
Anagennisi	2–2	2–2	1–2		2–0	3–1	1–1	6–2	2–0	0–0	1–0	2–3	0–1	2–0
Ayia Napa	1–0	2–0	0–3	2–1		4–0	1–0	1–1	2–2	2–1	3–0	2–1	1–2	2–0
THOI	4–0	1–0	3–2	2–3	1–1		2–1	1–0	0–3	1–1	3–0	0–1	0–2	2–0
Elia	2–3	4–2	1–0	0–0	1–0	1–0		2–2	0–1	0–0	2–2	1–0	0–0	2–0
Ethnikos	1–0	3–0	0–1	2–3	3–1	1–1	1–2		0–1	0–3	3–4	2–2	2–2	2–0
Iraklis	3–1	2–0	0–0	2–1	4–1	2–1	5–2	1–0		1–1	7–0	1–3	1–2	2–0
Kinyras	3–0	0–0	0–0	1–0	2–1	0–1	2–1	0–0	0–0		1–0	3–2	0–0	2–0
Orfeas	2–2	2–1	2–0	2–1	1–8	1–1	1–1	1–2	0–1	1–3		1–0	1–1	2–0
Othellos	1–2	3–0	1–0	0–0	0–2	1–0	5–0	0–2	3–0	3–2	2–1		1–3	2–0
Rotsidis	8–2	2–0	1–0	4–2	0–3	2–0	2–1	3–1	4–2	2–0	5–2	1–0		2–0
Tsaggaris (Note: Tsaggaris Peledriou withdrew before the start of the season; all their matches were awarded 2–0 to their opponents.)	0–2	0–2	0–2	0–2	0–2	0–2	0–2	0–2	0–2	0–2	0–2	0–2	0–2	

Legend: Blue = home team win; Yellow = draw; Red = away team win.

== See also ==
- Cypriot Third Division
- 1996–97 Cypriot First Division
- 1996–97 Cypriot Cup

== Sources ==
- "1996/97 Cypriot Third Division". Rec.Sport.Soccer Statistics Foundation. 2016-01-14.
