= Cypriot Futsal Super Cup =

- Founded: 2015; 11 years ago
- Region: Cyprus (Cyprus Football Association)
- Teams: 2
- Current champions: AEL (3rd title)
- Most championships: Omonia (4 titles)

The Cypriot Futsal Super Cup is a Cypriot futsal competition contested by the winners of the Cypriot First Division and the winners of the Cypriot Cup.

== Winners ==
Year	Winners	Runners-up	Score
2015	APOEL	AEK Larnaca	8–1
2016	APOEL	Anorthosis	Abandoned (Note: The 2016 Super Cup match between APOEL and Anorthosis was abandoned after 14 minutes due to rioting (APOEL was leading 1–0). CFA punished both teams and did not awarded any trophy to one of them, so this seasons' competition ended without any winner.)
2017	Anorthosis	AEL	9–6
2018	Omonia	APOEL	5–0
2019	Omonia	APOEL	7–3
2020	Abandoned		
2021	Omonia	APOEL	2–1
2022	Omonia	APOEL	8–5
2023	AEL	APOEL	8–2
2024	AEL	AEK Larnaca	6–4
2025	AEL	Omonia	6–2

== Performance by club ==
Team	Winners	Runners-up	Winning years
Omonia	4	1	2018, 2019, 2021, 2022
AEL	3	1	2023, 2024, 2025
APOEL	1	6	2015
Anorthosis	1	1	2017
AEK Larnaca	0	2	
