= 1995–96 Cypriot Third Division =

Cypriot Third Division
- Season: 1995–96
- Champions: Ermis Aradippou (2nd title)
- Promoted: Ermis Aradippou; Achyronas Liopetriou; AEK Kakopetrias
- Relegated: Digenis Oroklinis; Digenis Akritas Ipsona; Fotiakos Frenarou

The 1995–96 Cypriot Third Division was the 25th season of the Cypriot third-level football league. Ermis Aradippou won their 2nd title.

== Format ==
Fourteen teams participated in the 1995–96 Cypriot Third Division. All teams played against each other twice, once at their home and once away. The team with the most points at the end of the season crowned champions. The first three teams were promoted to the 1996–97 Cypriot Second Division and the last three teams were relegated to the 1996–97 Cypriot Fourth Division.

=== Point system ===
Teams received three points for a win, one point for a draw and zero points for a loss.

== League standings ==
Pos	Team	Pld	W	D	L	GF	GA	GD	Pts	Promotion or relegation
1	Ermis Aradippou FC	26	–	–	–	59	19	+40	55	Promoted to 1996–97 Cypriot Second Division
2	Achyronas Liopetriou	26	–	–	–	53	17	+36	54	Promoted to 1996–97 Cypriot Second Division
3	AEK Kakopetrias	26	–	–	–	45	25	+20	51	Promoted to 1996–97 Cypriot Second Division
4	Rotsidis Mammari	26	–	–	–	53	30	+23	42	
5	Anagennisi Germasogeias FC	26	–	–	–	38	28	+10	42	
6	Elia Lythrodonta	26	–	–	–	30	30	0	41	
7	APEP Pelendriou	26	–	–	–	28	25	+3	39	
8	AEK Katholiki	26	–	–	–	38	31	+7	37	
9	ENTHOI Lakatamia FC	26	–	–	–	26	25	+1	33	
10	Orfeas Nicosia	26	–	–	–	34	41	−7	31	
11	Tsaggaris Peledriou	26	–	–	–	32	51	−19	28	
12	Digenis Oroklinis	26	–	–	–	27	35	−8	27	Relegated to 1996–97 Cypriot Fourth Division
13	Digenis Akritas Ipsona	26	–	–	–	27	57	−30	20	Relegated to 1996–97 Cypriot Fourth Division
14	Fotiakos Frenarou	26	–	–	–	16	82	−66	9	Relegated to 1996–97 Cypriot Fourth Division

Rules for classification: 1) Points, 2) Goal differences, 3) Goal for

== Sources ==
- "Έπεσε χθες η αυλαία". Phileleftheros (in Greek). 1996-05-13. p. 14.

== See also ==
- Cypriot Third Division
- 1995–96 Cypriot First Division
- 1995–96 Cypriot Cup
