= 1995–96 Cypriot Fourth Division =

Cypriot Fourth Division
- Season: 1995–96
- Champions: Iraklis Gerolakkou (2nd title)
- Promoted: Iraklis Gerolakkou; ASIL Lysi; Kinyras Empas
- Relegated: Ethnikos Defteras; Livadiakos Livadion; APEI Ipsona

The 1995–96 Cypriot Fourth Division was the 11th season of the Cypriot fourth-level football league. Iraklis Gerolakkou won their 2nd title. The first 3 teams were promoted to the 1995–96 Cypriot Third Division. The last three teams were relegated to regional leagues.

== See also ==
- Cypriot Fourth Division
- 1995–96 Cypriot First Division
- 1995–96 Cypriot Cup
