= 1995–96 Cypriot Second Division =

Cypriot Second Division
- Season: 1995–96
- Champions: APOP (6th title)
- Promoted: APOP; APEP; Anagennisi
- Relegated: Ethnikos Latsion; Othellos; Ayia Napa
- Matches played: 182
- Goals scored: 570 (3.13 per match)

The 1995–96 Cypriot Second Division was the 41st season of the Cypriot second-level football league. APOP won their 6th title.

== Format ==
Fourteen teams participated in the 1995–96 Cypriot Second Division. All teams played against each other twice, once at their home and once away. The team with the most points at the end of the season crowned champions. The first three teams were promoted to 1996–97 Cypriot First Division and the last three teams were relegated to the 1996–97 Cypriot Third Division.

== Changes from previous season ==
Teams promoted to 1995–96 Cypriot First Division

- Evagoras Paphos
- Alki Larnaca

Teams promoted from 1994–95 Cypriot Third Division

- Ethnikos Latsion
- Ayia Napa
- Digenis Akritas Morphou
- Chalkanoras Idaliou
- Ethnikos Assia

== League standings ==
Pos	Team	Pld	W	D	L	GF	GA	GD	Pts	Promotion or relegation
1	APOP Paphos (C, P)	26	16	7	3	56	26	+30	55	Promoted to Cypriot First Division
2	APEP (P)	26	17	1	8	44	28	+16	52	Promoted to Cypriot First Division
3	Anagennisi Deryneia (P)	26	13	10	3	49	20	+29	49	Promoted to Cypriot First Division
4	Digenis Morphou	26	14	3	9	49	24	+25	45	
5	Chalkanoras Idaliou	26	12	5	9	47	38	+9	41	
6	Onisilos Sotira	26	12	5	9	40	38	+2	41	
7	PAEEK FC	26	10	7	9	35	33	+2	37	
8	Akritas Chlorakas	26	10	6	10	41	42	−1	36	
9	Ethnikos Assia	26	10	5	11	50	55	−5	35	
10	AEZ Zakakiou	26	9	7	10	34	37	−3	34	
11	Doxa Katokopias	26	8	9	9	34	35	−1	33	
12	Ethnikos Latsion (R)	26	6	5	15	36	56	−20	23	Relegated to Cypriot Third Division
13	Othellos Athienou (R)	26	6	4	16	29	67	−38	22	Relegated to Cypriot Third Division
14	Ayia Napa (R)	26	1	2	23	26	71	−45	5	Relegated to Cypriot Third Division

Rules for classification: 1) Points, 2) Goal differences, 3) Goal for
(C) Champions; (P) Promoted; (R) Relegated

== Results ==
Home \ Away	AEZ	AKR	ANG	AGN	APE	APO	DGN	DXK	ETA	ETL	OTH	ONS	PKK	CHL
AEZ Zakakiou		2–1	0–0	1–0	1–2	1–3	1–0	2–2	3–1	2–2	5–0	1–0	0–1	1–1
Akritas Chlorakas	2–2		1–1	4–3	1–2	0–1	2–1	2–0	4–3	1–1	6–1	1–0	2–2	2–0
Anagennisi	2–0	3–1		1–0	4–0	1–0	1–1	1–0	4–1	3–1	4–0	1–2	2–2	2–0
Ayia Napa	1–3	1–3	0–6		1–2	2–4	1–0	0–2	1–2	0–0	2–2	1–2	0–2	1–2
APEP	0–2	0–1	3–0	2–1		1–1	3–0	1–0	4–3	2–0	2–1	3–2	2–0	0–1
APOP Paphos	1–1	2–0	0–0	6–3	2–0		2–1	2–0	3–2	4–0	6–0	2–1	4–0	1–1
Digeniss Morphou	3–0	4–1	1–0	4–1	2–1	2–2		0–1	3–0	4–0	5–0	4–0	2–0	0–1
Doxa Katokopias	0–0	0–0	0–0	4–1	0–4	2–2	3–2		1–0	3–1	2–0	4–4	1–1	2–3
Ethnikos Assia	3–0	3–0	0–4	3–1	1–2	1–1	0–2	1–0		1–0	4–3	4–4	1–0	5–4
Ethnikos Latsion	1–0	1–2	3–3	5–2	0–1	5–2	1–2	1–1	3–2		1–2	4–3	1–0	1–2
Othellos Athienou	2–4	1–1	0–2	2–0	0–4	1–0	2–4	2–2	2–3	2–1		2–1	0–0	2–1
Onisilos Sotira	2–1	1–0	1–1	2–0	2–1	0–1	1–0	1–0	3–3	2–1	2–0		2–0	0–3
PAEEK	3–1	2–1	2–2	4–1	2–0	1–2	0–2	3–1	1–1	4–2	2–0	0–0		2–0
Chalkanoras Idaliou	4–0	5–2	1–1	3–2	0–2	0–2	0–0	1–3	2–2	6–0	3–2	0–2	3–1	

Legend: Blue = home team win; Yellow = draw; Red = away team win.

== See also ==
- Cypriot Second Division
- 1995–96 Cypriot First Division
- 1995–96 Cypriot Cup

== Sources ==
- "1995/96 Cypriot Second Division". Rec.Sport.Soccer Statistics Foundation. 2016-01-14.
