= Anorthosis Famagusta Futsal =

Futsal team based in Larnaca, Cyprus

- Full name: Ανόρθωσις Αμμοχώστου Φούτσαλ; Anorthosis Famagusta Futsal
- Founded: April 2012; 14 years ago Larnaca, Cyprus
- Ground: Kition Athletic Center; Larnaca
- Capacity: 3,000
- League: Cypriot Futsal First Division
Home colours

Anorthosis Famagusta Futsal is the futsal team of Cypriot sports club Anorthosis Famagusta.

== History ==
The Anorthosis Famagusta Futsal club was founded on a desire to produce a futsal squad that could regularly compete at the highest level, together with a commitment to introduce and accelerate the game's development in surrounding schools and communities.

=== 2012 ===
The club joined and competed in the Cypriot Futsal First Division from April 2012. Within three years the part Futsal we accomplished since the third category climb to the first category of the Cyprus Futsal championships Anorthosis finished third in the league table and managed to get the rise for the second category

=== 2013 ===
For the first time in the history of Anorthosis struggling in Division Two, at which point the second and advancing to the first category.

=== 2014 ===
For the first time in the history of Anorthosis struggling in the First Division Futsal Championship.

=== 2015 ===
For the first time in the history of Anorthosis struggling in the First Division Futsal Championship finishing in third position and reaching the Cup semifinal

=== 2016 ===
In 2016, Anorthosis took the 3rd place of Cypriot Futsal First Division, with 53 points, 11 points under the champion Apoel Nicosia. Also Anorthosis faced against Apoel Nicosia in the Cypriot Futsal Cup finals by losing 5–6 in Eleftheria Indoor Hall.

=== 2017 ===
Anorthosis Famagusta won the championship for the first time, beating Omonia by 2–0 in series [5-2 in Larnaca (home), 4–7 in Nicosia (away)]

== Current squad ==
Last update: 7 October 2021

Note: Flags indicate national team as defined under FIFA eligibility rules; some limited exceptions apply. Players may hold more than one non-FIFA nationality.

No.	Pos.	Nation	Player
1	GK	CYP	Andreas Malaos
2	GK	CYP	Michalis Kalamaras
6	OUT	BRA	Wesley Estevao
7	OUT	CYP	Christos Kokkinos (captain)
8	OUT	CYP	Nicholas Filippou
9	OUT	CYP	Kleovoulos Michail
10	OUT	CYP	Konstantinos Kouloumbris

No.	Pos.	Nation	Player
11	OUT	CYP	Chrysostomos Papaspyrou
12	OUT	CYP	Charis Ioannou
13	OUT	CYP	Giorgos Kentis
14	OUT	CYP	Kypros Vrachimis
15	OUT	BRA	Isaias Ribeiro
17	OUT	CYP	Konstantinos Andreou
20	GK	CYP	Savvas Savva
