= 1996–97 Cypriot Second Division =

Cypriot Second Division
- Season: 1996–97
- Champions: AEL (1st title)
- Promoted: AEL; Evagoras; Ethnikos
- Relegated: Achyronas; AEZ; AEK
- Matches played: 182
- Goals scored: 452 (2.48 per match)

The 1996–97 Cypriot Second Division was the 42nd season of the Cypriot second-level football league. AEL won their 1st title.

== Format ==
Fourteen teams participated in the 1996–97 Cypriot Second Division. All teams played against each other twice, once at their home and once away. The team with the most points at the end of the season crowned champions. The first three teams were promoted to 1997–98 Cypriot First Division and the last three teams were relegated to the 1997–98 Cypriot Third Division.

== Changes from previous season ==
Teams promoted to 1996–97 Cypriot First Division

- APOP Paphos
- APEP
- Anagennisi Deryneia

Teams relegated from 1995–96 Cypriot First Division

- AEL Limassol
- Evagoras Paphos
- Omonia Aradippou

Teams promoted from 1995–96 Cypriot Third Division

- Ermis Aradippou
- Achyronas Liopetriou
- AEK Kakopetrias

Teams relegated to 1996–97 Cypriot Third Division

- Ethnikos Latsion
- Othellos Athienou
- Ayia Napa

== League standings ==
Pos	Team	Pld	W	D	L	GF	GA	GD	Pts	Promotion or relegation
1	AEL Limassol (C, P)	26	21	2	3	59	13	+46	65	Promoted to Cypriot First Division
2	Evagoras Paphos (P)	26	12	10	4	40	22	+18	46	Promoted to Cypriot First Division
3	Ethnikos Assia (P)	26	13	5	8	43	29	+14	44	Promoted to Cypriot First Division
4	Chalkanoras Idaliou	26	12	3	11	31	37	−6	39	
5	Ermis Aradippou	26	9	9	8	34	28	+6	36	
6	Doxa Katokopias	26	10	6	10	27	29	−2	36	
7	Onisilos Sotira	26	8	10	8	29	26	+3	34	
8	Omonia Aradippou	26	9	7	10	24	22	+2	34	
9	Digenis Akritas Morphou	26	8	10	8	27	27	0	34	
10	PAEEK FC	26	9	7	10	29	31	−2	34	
11	Akritas Chlorakas	26	8	9	9	33	42	−9	33	
12	Achyronas Liopetriou (R)	26	9	5	12	32	50	−18	32	Relegated to Cypriot Third Division
13	AEZ Zakakiou (R)	26	7	4	15	27	32	−5	25	Relegated to Cypriot Third Division
14	AEK Kakopetrias (R)	26	1	5	20	17	64	−47	8	Relegated to Cypriot Third Division

Rules for classification: 1) Points, 2) Goal differences, 3) Goal for
(C) Champions; (P) Promoted; (R) Relegated

== Results ==
Home \ Away	AEZ	AEK	AEL	AKR	ACH	DGN	DOX	ETH	ERM	EYR	OMN	ONS	PAK	CHL
AEZ Zakakiou		2–0	0–2	2–0	3–0	0–0	1–3	3–0	0–2	0–1	1–0	1–1	1–2	6–0
AEK Kakopetrias	3–2		0–1	2–2	2–2	1–3	0–2	0–1	1–3	0–4	1–3	0–2	1–1	0–2
AEL Limassol	2–0	6–1		2–0	6–0	3–0	2–1	4–0	2–0	2–1	1–0	2–1	1–0	5–1
Akritas	3–1	2–0	1–1		2–2	2–1	2–0	1–4	1–0	3–3	1–1	2–2	1–0	1–0
Achyronas	0–0	2–1	1–3	1–1		2–1	2–1	1–1	2–1	3–1	3–0	3–2	2–1	2–0
Digenis	3–0	2–2	0–1	1–0	3–1		1–1	2–0	1–0	1–1	0–1	0–0	2–0	0–0
Doxa	1–0	2–0	1–2	5–1	2–0	1–1		0–0	1–1	0–0	0–1	3–1	0–2	1–0
Ethnikos	1–0	6–0	1–4	2–0	1–0	1–1	4–0		5–0	1–1	0–1	1–3	4–1	0–1
Ermis	2–1	3–0	1–0	1–1	6–2	1–2	2–0	1–1		0–2	0–0	0–0	0–0	1–1
Evagoras	1–0	2–1	0–0	3–1	3–0	4–0	3–0	2–1	0–0		1–0	2–2	0–0	3–1
Omonia	2–0	0–0	2–1	0–0	4–0	3–1	0–1	1–3	0–1	1–1		1–1	0–0	1–2
Onisilos	0–0	3–0	0–1	0–2	2–0	1–1	0–1	1–2	2–0	0–0	1–0		1–1	1–0
PAEEK FC	1–2	4–1	1–0	4–2	2–1	0–0	0–0	1–2	1–6	2–0	1–0	1–2		2–0
Chalkanoras	2–1	2–0	0–5	4–1	1–0	1–0	3–0	0–1	2–2	3–1	1–2	2–0	2–1	

Legend: Blue = home team win; Yellow = draw; Red = away team win.

== See also ==
- Cypriot Second Division
- 1996–97 Cypriot First Division
- 1996–97 Cypriot Cup

== Sources ==
- "1996/97 Cypriot Second Division". Rec.Sport.Soccer Statistics Foundation. 2016-01-14.
