= Sevim Ebeoğlu =

Cypriot-Turkish footballer (born 1931)

Sevim Ebeoğlu Σεβήμ Εμπέογλου
Personal information
- Date of birth: 3 February 1931 (age 95)
- Place of birth: Alektora, Cyprus
- Date of death: 21 November 2018 (aged 87)
- Place of death: Girne, Turkish Republic of Northern Cyprus
- Position: Striker

Senior career*
Years	Team	Apps	(Gls)
...–1950	Doğan Türk Birliği		
1950–1956	AEL Limassol		
1956	Coventry City		
1956–1957	AEL Limassol		
1957–1961	Doğan Türk Birliği		
- * Club domestic league appearances and goals

Sevim Ebeoğlu (Greek: Σεβήμ Εμπέογλου; 3 February 1931 – 21 November 2018) was a Turkish-Cypriot professional footballer who played as a Striker.

== Club career ==
He started his career at Doğan Türk Birliği. He was discovered there by Argyris Gavalas, who took him to AEL Limassol in 1950. He won three championships and a super cup with AEL, and also won the league's top scorer award two times with AEL.

In early 1956, he went to England and played for Coventry City for three months. He subsequently returned to AEL, remaining there until 1957. In 1957, he left due to the unrest prevailing at the time and joined Doğan Türk Birliği.

== Yellow-Navy Blue Love ==
Ebeoğlu, an ardent Fenerbahçe S.K. supporter, spearheaded the change of AEL Limassol's colors from blue and white to yellow and navy blue during the 1955–56 season.

== Honours ==
=== Club ===
AEL Lİmassol

- Cypriot First Division (3): 1952–53, 1954–55, 1955–56
- Cypriot Super Cup: 1953

Doğan Türk Birliği

- KTFF Süper Lig: 1958–59

=== Induvidual ===
- Cypriot First Division Top-scorer (2): 1952–53, 1954–55
- KTFF Süper Lig Top-scorer (2): 1958–59, 1960–61
