= 1996–97 Cypriot First Division =

Cypriot First Division
- Season: 1996–97
- Champions: Anorthosis (8th title)
- Relegated: Aris; Olympiakos; APEP
- Champions League: Anorthosis (1st qualifying round)
- UEFA Cup: Apollon (1st qualifying round)
- Cup Winners' Cup: APOEL (qualifying round; via Cypriot Cup)
- Intertoto Cup: Nea Salamis (group stage)
- Matches played: 182
- Goals scored: 564 (3.1 per match)
- Top goalscorer: Michalis Konstantinou (17 goals)

The 1996–97 Cypriot First Division was the 58th season of the Cypriot top-level football league. Anorthosis won their 8th title.

== Format ==
Fourteen teams participated in the 1996–97 Cypriot First Division. All teams played against each other twice, once at their home and once away. The team with the most points at the end of the season crowned champions. The last three teams were relegated to the 1997–98 Cypriot Second Division.

The champions ensured their participation in the 1997–98 UEFA Champions League and the runners-up in the 1997–98 UEFA Cup.

The teams had to declare their interest to participate in the 1997 UEFA Intertoto Cup before the end of the championship. At the end of the championship, the higher placed team among the interested ones participated in the Intertoto Cup (if they had not secured their participation in any other UEFA competition).

=== Point system ===
Teams received three points for a win, one point for a draw and zero points for a loss.

== Changes from previous season ==
AEL Limassol, Evagoras Paphos and Omonia Aradippou were relegated from previous season and played in the 1996–97 Cypriot Second Division. They were replaced by the first three teams of the 1995–96 Cypriot Second Division, APOP Paphos. APEP and Anagennisi Deryneia.

== Stadia and locations ==
1996–97 Cypriot First Division

Club	Venue
ΑΕΚ	GSZ Stadium
Alki	GSZ Stadium
Anagennisi	Anagennisi Football Ground
Anorthosis	Antonis Papadopoulos Stadium
APEP	Kyperounda Municipal Stadium
APOEL	Makario Stadium
Apollon	Tsirion Stadium
APOP	Pafiako Stadium
Aris	Tsirion Stadium
Ethnikos	Dasaki Stadium
Enosis	Paralimni Municipal Stadium
Nea Salamina	Ammochostos Stadium
Olympiakos	Makario Stadium
Omonia	Makario Stadium

== League standings ==
Pos	Team	Pld	W	D	L	GF	GA	GD	Pts	Qualification or relegation
1	Anorthosis (C)	26	20	5	1	58	14	+44	65	Qualification for Champions League first qualifying round
2	Apollon	26	16	4	6	43	22	+21	52	Qualification for UEFA Cup first qualifying round
3	Omonia	26	14	4	8	39	30	+9	46	
4	AEK	26	11	8	7	49	37	+12	41	
5	APOEL	26	12	4	10	57	43	+14	40	Qualification for Cup Winners' Cup qualifying round
6	Ethnikos	26	11	4	11	48	36	+12	37	
7	Enosis Neon Paralimni	26	9	8	9	48	48	0	35	
8	Nea Salamis	26	8	10	8	42	36	+6	34	Qualification for Intertoto Cup group stage
9	Anagennisi	26	9	5	12	27	42	−15	32	
10	APOP	26	9	4	13	29	44	−15	31	
11	Alki	26	8	6	12	41	49	−8	30	
12	Aris (R)	26	7	7	12	33	41	−8	28	Relegation to Cypriot Second Division
13	Olympiakos (R)	26	8	3	15	28	47	−19	27	Relegation to Cypriot Second Division
14	APEP (R)	26	3	2	21	22	75	−53	11	Relegation to Cypriot Second Division

Rules for classification: 1) Points, 2) Goal differences, 3) Goals for.
(C) Champions; (R) Relegated

== Results ==
Home \ Away	AEK	ALK	ANG	ANR	APE	APN	APL	APP	ARD	ETH	ENP	NSL	OLY	OMO
AEK		3–0	1–1	0–1	4–0	1–2	3–3	2–2	4–1	4–1	2–2	1–0	3–0	3–2
Alki	0–2		2–2	0–0	0–2	2–5	1–0	1–3	2–0	2–3	1–0	3–3	3–2	2–4
Anagennisi	2–2	0–0		1–4	3–2	1–0	2–3	1–0	1–3	1–0	0–0	2–1	1–0	1–2
Anorthosi	2–0	2–1	2–0		5–1	1–0	0–0	5–0	1–1	1–0	5–2	2–0	4–0	2–1
APEP	4–2	1–4	0–1	0–3		2–1	1–3	2–3	1–2	0–9	1–3	1–1	0–1	2–2
APOEL	2–3	1–5	0–1	2–4	6–1		3–0	5–4	3–0	2–1	3–3	3–1	5–0	2–2
Apollon	0–0	5–1	4–1	1–0	2–0	1–0		3–0	1–0	2–0	0–1	0–3	4–0	2–0
APOP	1–1	0–1	1–0	0–1	1–0	3–2	0–2		3–0	0–3	1–0	0–1	0–1	2–0
Aris	2–1	2–2	3–1	0–0	2–1	1–1	0–1	0–1		0–0	3–4	0–2	4–2	1–2
Ethnikos	3–1	1–5	5–0	1–2	1–0	2–2	2–3	4–0	1–0		1–1	2–2	1–0	2–1
Enosis	1–2	3–0	2–1	0–5	6–0	2–3	1–0	2–2	3–3	1–2		3–3	1–0	0–2
Nea Salamis	2–3	1–1	3–1	1–1	6–0	0–2	1–3	1–1	1–1	2–1	2–2		2–1	0–1
Olympiakos	2–0	1–0	2–1	2–3	2–0	1–2	0–0	3–1	1–4	2–1	3–4	1–1		1–2
Omonia	1–1	3–2	0–1	0–2	2–0	1–0	2–0	3–0	1–0	2–1	3–1	0–2	0–0	

Legend: Blue = home team win; Yellow = draw; Red = away team win.

== See also ==
- Cypriot First Division
- 1996–97 Cypriot Cup
- List of top goalscorers in Cypriot First Division by season
- Cypriot football clubs in European competitions

== Sources ==
- "1996/97 Cypriot First Division". Rec.Sport.Soccer Statistics Foundation. 2016-01-14.
