= Cypriot Futsal First Division =

- Founded: 1999
- Country: Cyprus
- Confederation: UEFA
- Number of clubs: 11
- Level on pyramid: 1
- Relegation to: Cypriot Second Division
- Domestic cup(s): Cypriot Futsal Cup; Cypriot Futsal Super Cup
- International cup: UEFA Futsal Champions League
- Current champions: APOEL (7th title) (2025–26)
- Most championships: AGBU Ararat & APOEL (7 titles)
- Current: 2025–26 Cypriot Futsal First Division

Cypriot Futsal First Division (Greek: Πρωτάθλημα Α' Κατηγορίας Futsal) is the top tier futsal league in Cyprus. It was founded in 1999 and is organized by Cyprus Football Association. The competition is played under UEFA and FIFA rules, currently consists of 11 teams.

== Champions ==
Season	Winner
1999–00	Spartakos Limassol
2000–01	AGBU Ararat
2001–02	AGBU Ararat
2002–03	AGBU Ararat
2003–04	AGBU Ararat
2004–05	AGBU Ararat
2005–06	Parnassos Strovolou
2006–07	AGBU Ararat
2007–08	Parnassos Strovolou
2008–09	Omonia
2009–10	AGBU Ararat
2010–11	Omonia
2011–12	Omonia
2012–13	Omonia
2013–14	APOEL
2014–15	APOEL
2015–16	APOEL
2016–17	Anorthosis Famagusta
2017–18	APOEL
2018–19	Omonia
2019–20	Abandoned
2020–21	APOEL
2021–22	APOEL
2022–23	AEL Limassol
2023–24	AEL Limassol
2024–25	AEL Limassol
2025–26	APOEL

== Performance by club ==
Team	Winners	Years won
AGBU Ararat	7	2001, 2002, 2003, 2004, 2005, 2007, 2010
APOEL	7	2014, 2015, 2016, 2018, 2021, 2022, 2026
Omonia	5	2009, 2011, 2012, 2013, 2019
AEL Limassol	3	2023, 2024, 2025
Parnassos Strovolou	2	2006, 2008
Spartakos Limassol	1	2000
Anorthosis Famagusta	1	2017
