= AGBU Ararat Nicosia FC =

Ararat
- Full name: AGBU Ararat Nicosia FC
- Founded: 1999
- Ground: Melkonian indoor hall, Nicosia, Cyprus
- Manager: (Cyprus) Rafo Yazmadjian
- League: Cypriot Futsal First Division
Home colours	Away colours

Armenian General Benevolent Union Ararat Nicosia Futsal Club is a futsal club based in Nicosia, Cyprus.

== Honours ==
=== National ===
- Cypriot First Division (7): 2001, 2002, 2003, 2004, 2005, 2007, 2010
- Cypriot Cup (6): 2000, 2003, 2005, 2008, 2009, 2010

== See also ==
- Armenian General Benevolent Union
