= Eleftheria Indoor Hall =

Sports arena in Cyprus

Eleftheria Athletic Center
- Interactive map of Eleftheria Athletic Center
- Full name: Tassos Papadopoulos-Eleftheria Indoor Hall
- Location: Engomi, Nicosia, Cyprus
- Coordinates: 35.147257°N 33.312066°E
- Owner: Cyprus Sport Organisation
- Capacity: 6,000
- Surface: Versatile

Construction
- Opened: 1993

Tenants
- ETHA Engomi BC; Omonia BC; Omonia Futsal; Omonia VC

Eleftheria Athletic Center (Greek: Αθλητικό Κέντρο "Ελευθερία"), officially named Tassos Papadopoulos Eleftheria Indoor Hall (Greek: κλειστό στάδιο "Τάσσος Παπαδόπουλος - Ελευθερία") is an indoor arena that is located besides Makario Stadium and Lefkotheo Indoor Hall in Engomi, Nicosia, Cyprus.

The hall is mainly used for basketball events, although it can also be used for badminton, gymnastics, karate, taekwondo, handball, squash, volleyball, judo, futsal and table tennis. It is sometimes also used for national celebrations, for the declaration of the new President of Cyprus, and for musical concerts.

The arena is named after Tassos Papadopoulos, the fifth President of the Republic of Cyprus, who was in office from February 28, 2003, to February 28, 2008. Currently, the arena has a capacity of around 6,800 seats, and it is the second biggest indoor sports hall on the island of Cyprus, after the "Spyros Kyprianou Athletic Centre" in Limassol.

== History ==
Eleftheria was built in 1993. It is the home venue of AC Omonia Nicosia BC, ETHA Engomis, and the senior men's Cypriot national basketball team. It has hosted several great basketball and other sports competitions, and also some cultural competitions.

The most important was Miss Universe 2000, where Lara Dutta of India, won the title, and was awarded as Miss Universe 2000. 79 delegates competed for the crown. The European Saporta Cup final of 1996–97, between Real Madrid and Verona, where Real Madrid won the trophy, and the FIBA EuroCup All-Star Day in 2005, were also held in the arena.

It has also hosted some Cypriot Basketball League Finals and Cypriot Cup Finals. On 25 October 2013, it hosted the first ever EuroLeague game held in Cyprus. For the second game of the 2013–14 Euroleague's regular season group stage, Panathinaikos played against Laboral Kutxa, in a game in which Panathinaikos won by a score of 95–74. The attendance for the game was 6,200.

The hall also hosts the official 1st of April commemoration and has also seen a number of presidents delivering their victory speech there.

== See also ==
- Makario Stadium
- Lefkotheo

Events and tenants
Preceded by Araba Arena (Spain) Vitoria	EuroCup; Final Venue; 1997	Succeeded by Pionir Hall (Serbia) Belgrade
Preceded by Chaguaramas Convention Center (Trinidad and Tobago) Chaguaramas	Miss Universe venue 2000	Succeeded by Coliseo Rubén Rodríguez (Puerto Rico) Bayamón
