= 1995–96 Cypriot First Division =

Cypriot First Division
- Season: 1995–96
- Champions: APOEL (16th title)
- Relegated: AEL; Evagoras; Omonia Ar.
- UEFA Cup: APOEL (preliminary round); Anorthosis (preliminary round)
- Cup Winners' Cup: AEK (qualifying round; via Cypriot Cup)
- Intertoto Cup: Apollon (group stage)
- Matches: 182
- Goals: 553 (3.04 per match)
- Top goalscorer: József Kiprich (25 goals)
- Biggest home win: Omonia Nicosia 8–1 Evagoras Paphos
- Biggest away win: Omonia Aradippou 0–9 Omonia Nicosia
- Highest scoring: Omonia Nicosia 8–1 Evagoras Paphos; Omonia Aradippou 0–9 Omonia Nicosia

The 1995–96 Cypriot First Division was the 57th season of the Cypriot top-level football league. APOEL won their 16th title.

== Format ==
Fourteen teams participated in the 1995–96 Cypriot First Division. All teams played against each other twice, once at their home and once away. The team with the most points at the end of the season crowned champions. The last three teams were relegated to the 1996–97 Cypriot Second Division.

Cypriot teams didn't gained enough points in the previous seasons and so the champion team did not qualify to 1996–97 UEFA Champions League. The champions and the runners-up ensured their participation in the 1996–97 UEFA Cup.

The teams had to declare their interest to participate in the 1996 UEFA Intertoto Cup before the end of the championship. At the end of the championship, the higher placed team among the interested ones participated in the Intertoto Cup (if they had not secured their participation in any other UEFA competition).

=== Point system ===
Teams received three points for a win, one point for a draw and zero points for a loss.

== Changes from previous season ==
The league expanded from 12 to 14 teams this season, comprised twelve teams from the 1994–95 season and two promoted teams from the 1994–95 Cypriot Second Division, Evagoras Paphos and Alki Larnaca.

== Stadia and locations ==
1995–96 Cypriot First Division

Club	Venue
ΑΕΚ	GSZ Stadium
AEL	Tsirion Stadium
Alki	GSZ Stadium
Anorthosis	Antonis Papadopoulos Stadium
APOEL	Makario Stadium
Apollon	Tsirion Stadium
Aris	Tsirion Stadium
Ethnikos	Dasaki Stadium
Enosis	Paralimni Municipal Stadium
Evagoras	Pafiako Stadium
Nea Salamina	Ammochostos Stadium
Olympiakos	Makario Stadium
Omonia Ar.	Aradippou Municipal Stadium
Omonia	Makario Stadium

== League standings ==
Pos	Team	Pld	W	D	L	GF	GA	GD	Pts	Qualification or relegation
1	APOEL (C)	26	19	7	0	65	21	+44	64	Qualification for UEFA Cup preliminary round
2	Anorthosis	26	16	7	3	50	23	+27	55	Qualification for UEFA Cup preliminary round
3	Omonia	26	16	5	5	66	30	+36	53	
4	AEK	26	16	5	5	44	21	+23	53	Qualification for Cup Winners' Cup qualifying round (Note: AEK Larnaca qualified to 1996–97 UEFA Cup Winners' Cup because Cypriot Cup winner, APOEL, already qualified as champion to UEFA Cup.)
5	Apollon	26	10	10	6	42	29	+13	40	Qualification for Intertoto Cup group stage
6	Ethinikos Achna	26	9	10	7	36	33	+3	37	
7	Enosis Neon Paralimni	26	8	9	9	37	40	−3	33	
8	Nea Salamina	26	10	3	13	37	48	−11	33	
9	Aris	26	7	10	9	34	36	−2	31	
10	Alki	26	8	7	11	42	46	−4	31	
11	Olympiakos	26	8	6	12	24	32	−8	30	
12	AEL (R)	26	6	6	14	37	49	−12	24	Relegation to Cypriot Second Division
13	Evagoras (R)	26	2	7	17	21	59	−38	13	Relegation to Cypriot Second Division
14	Omonia Ar. (R)	26	0	2	24	18	86	−68	2	Relegation to Cypriot Second Division

Rules for classification: 1) Points, 2) Goal differences, 3) Goals for.
(C) Champions; (R) Relegated

== Results ==
Home \ Away	AEK	AEL	ALK	ANR	APN	APL	ARS	ETH	ENP	EVG	NSL	OLY	OMA	OMN
AEK		1–1	3–1	2–2	0–0	3–0	2–1	2–1	3–0	2–0	4–1	1–0	1–0	3–0
AEL	0–3		2–3	1–1	0–3	1–1	1–2	0–0	2–2	5–1	0–1	3–1	3–1	1–2
Alki	1–3	2–4		0–3	1–2	2–2	0–2	3–3	0–0	1–0	5–0	1–0	5–1	2–0
Anorthosis	2–1	2–2	2–2		3–3	1–0	4–2	2–0	5–0	2–0	3–2	1–0	6–0	1–0
APOEL	1–0	3–0	2–1	3–0		1–0	2–2	3–2	3–2	5–1	4–1	1–0	5–0	1–1
Apollon	3–1	3–1	3–0	0–0	0–2		2–1	2–0	1–1	1–1	3–3	0–0	5–0	1–2
Aris	1–1	1–0	2–3	2–0	1–1	1–1		1–1	0–0	3–0	1–2	1–2	1–1	1–4
Ethnikos	1–1	2–1	1–1	0–0	1–4	3–0	1–1		0–0	1–1	1–0	4–1	2–1	0–2
ENP	1–0	4–1	2–1	0–3	1–1	0–2	3–1	2–3		5–1	1–1	2–1	4–1	0–1
Evagoras	0–1	0–2	2–2	0–2	1–1	0–5	1–2	0–0	2–2		1–2	0–2	5–0	0–2
Nea Salamina	0–1	2–1	1–0	0–1	1–4	1–2	2–0	1–4	2–1	1–1		4–0	4–1	2–5
Olympiakos	0–2	1–0	2–0	1–2	0–2	2–2	0–0	2–0	1–1	1–0	1–0		1–1	0–1
Omonia Ar.	1–2	1–3	3–4	0–2	0–4	1–2	1–3	1–3	1–2	1–2	0–3	0–2		0–9
Omonia N.	3–1	6–2	1–1	2–0	2–4	1–1	1–1	1–2	3–1	8–1	3–0	3–3	3–1	

Legend: Blue = home team win; Yellow = draw; Red = away team win.

== See also ==
- Cypriot First Division
- 1995–96 Cypriot Cup
- List of top goalscorers in Cypriot First Division by season
- Cypriot football clubs in European competitions

== Sources ==
- "1995/96 Cypriot First Division". Rec.Sport.Soccer Statistics Foundation. 2016-01-14.
