= Cyprus Football Association =

Football governing body

UEFA
- Short name: CFA
- Founded: 23 September 1934; 91 years ago
- Headquarters: Nicosia, Cyprus
- FIFA affiliation: 1948
- UEFA affiliation: 1962
- President: Giorgos Koumas
- Website: cfa.com.cy

The Cyprus Football Association (CFA) (Greek: Κυπριακή Ομοσπονδία Ποδοσφαίρου (ΚΟΠ), romanized: Kypriakí Omospondía Podosfaírou (KOP), Turkish: Kıbrıs Futbol Federasyonu (KFF)) is the governing body of football in Cyprus and is based in Nicosia. It organises Cyprus's football championships, whose top league is the Cypriot First Division, the Cypriot Cup, the Cypriot Super Cup and the Cypriot national football team. Cyprus Football Association is also responsible for organising futsal competitions, including the Cypriot Futsal league, the Cypriot Futsal Cup and the Cypriot Futsal Super Cup.

== History ==
Organised football was introduced to Cyprus in early 20th century by the British. Initially played in the island's schools, it become very popular and a number of clubs were immediately formed. As football solidified, all clubs agreed that an official body was needed to regulate the sport. On 23 September 1934, the following eight clubs founded the Cyprus Football Association: AEL Limassol, Anorthosis Famagusta, APOEL, Aris Limassol, EPA Larnaca, Olympiakos Nicosia, Lefkoşa Türk Spor Kulübü and Trust. After its establishment, football began to be played on an official basis with the CFA organising various championships for its member clubs.

Cyprus Football Association became a member of FIFA in 1948 and of UEFA in 1962.

In 2007, Cyprus Football Association moved to its new headquarters in Nicosia. The opening ceremony was attended by the president of UEFA Michel Platini, and of Cyprus, Tassos Papadopoulos.
