= Omonia Futsal =

Omonia
- Full name: Omonia Nicosia Futsal
- Nickname: Vasilissa (Queen)
- Founded: 2008; 18 years ago
- Ground: Eleftheria Indoor Hall, Nicosia, Cyprus
- Capacity: 6,000
- Chairman: (Cyprus) Lambros Christou
- Manager: (Cyprus) Totis Paraskeva
- League: Cypriot First Division
- 2022–23: 1st
- Website: https://www.acomonia.com/futsal/
Home colours	Away colours

Omonia Futsal is a professional futsal team based in the city of Nicosia, Cyprus and it is a part of the AC Omonia. Omonia Futsal is one of the most successful futsal clubs in Cyprus with an overall tally of 5 Championships and 7 Cups.

== History ==
Omonia's futsal team was formed in 2008 as Omonia Futsal, and from the first year at the division won the league title. In 2016, they agreed to merge the club with Ararat for two years.

== Current squad ==
Last Update: 1 September 2021

Note: Flags indicate national team as defined under FIFA eligibility rules; some limited exceptions apply. Players may hold more than one non-FIFA nationality.

No.	Pos.	Nation	Player
4	Ala	CYP	Neophytos Lakoufis
7	Fixo	CYP	Christos Stylianou
8	Ala	CYP	Sakis Patikkis
10	Ala/Pivot	CYP	Constantinos Kouloumbris
11	Universal	BRA	Cesar Diniz Pereira
15	GK	CYP	Tasos Skampylis
16	Fixo	BRA	Carlos Anderson Eugenio da Silva (Beicola)
20	Ala	CYP	Giannis Ioannou
21	Ala	CYP	Noe El Kebbe
23	GK	CYP	Marios Christophorou
26	Ala	CYP	Taha El Kebbe
77	Ala	CYP	Alexandros Georgiou
92	Ala	CYP	Alexis Tsitsos

== Notable players ==
Note: Flags indicate national team as defined under FIFA eligibility rules; some limited exceptions apply. Players may hold more than one non-FIFA nationality.

No.	Pos.	Nation	Player
9	Pivot	BRA	RENAN ROBERTO MANTELLI
17	Pivot	CYP	Manolis Manoli
11	Universal	BRA	Cesar Diniz Pereira
15	GK	CYP	Tasos Skampylis

== Honours ==
- Cypriot Championship

Winners (5): 2008–09, 2010–11, 2011–12, 2012–13, 2018–19

- Cypriot Cup

Winners (7): 2010–11, 2011–12, 2012–13, 2017–18, 2018–19, 2020–2021, 2024–2025

== European competitions record ==
Last update: 4 October 2013

UEFA competitions
Competition	Played	Won	Drawn	Lost	Goals For	Goals Against	Goal Difference	Last season played
UEFA Futsal Cup / UEFA Futsal Champions League	24	10	3	11	95	90	+15	2019–20
Total	24	10	3	11	95	90	+15	

=== Matches ===
Season	Competition	Round	Country	Club	Result	Venue (Host City)	Qualified
2009–10	UEFA Futsal Cup	Preliminary round (Group B)	(Switzerland)	FC Seefeld Zürich	10–3	Eleftheria Indoor Hall (Nicosia)	1st place
2009–10	UEFA Futsal Cup	Preliminary round (Group B)	(Norway)	Nidaros Futsal	5–4	Eleftheria Indoor Hall (Nicosia)	1st place
2009–10	UEFA Futsal Cup	Preliminary round (Group B)	(Slovakia)	RCS Košice	5–2	Eleftheria Indoor Hall (Nicosia)	1st place
2009–10	UEFA Futsal Cup	Main round (Group 5)	(Azerbaijan)	Araz Naxçivan	1–4	Mate Parlov; Sport Centre (Pula)	4th place
2009–10	UEFA Futsal Cup	Main round (Group 5)	(Croatia)	MNK Potpićan 98	3–3	Mate Parlov; Sport Centre (Pula)	4th place
2009–10	UEFA Futsal Cup	Main round (Group 5)	(Serbia)	KMF Kolubara Lazarevac	3–7	Mate Parlov; Sport Centre (Pula)	4th place
2011–12	UEFA Futsal Cup	Preliminary round (Group G)	(France)	Paris SC	5–4	Eleftheria Indoor Hall (Nicosia)	1st place
2011–12	UEFA Futsal Cup	Preliminary round (Group G)	(Albania)	KS Flamurtari	6–0	Eleftheria Indoor Hall (Nicosia)	1st place
2011–12	UEFA Futsal Cup	Preliminary round (Group G)	(Armenia)	Erebuni Yerevan	8–2	Eleftheria Indoor Hall (Nicosia)	1st place
2011–12	UEFA Futsal Cup	Main round (Group F)	(Ukraine)	Uragan Ivano-Frankivsk	4–6	Jezero Hall (Kragujevac)	3rd place
2011–12	UEFA Futsal Cup	Main round (Group F)	(Serbia)	KMF Ekonomac	1–5	Jezero Hall (Kragujevac)	3rd place
2011–12	UEFA Futsal Cup	Main round (Group F)	(Israel)	ASA Ben Gurion	2–1	Jezero Hall (Kragujevac)	3rd place
2012–13	UEFA Futsal Cup	Main round (Group 1)	(Slovakia)	Slov-Matic Bratislava	3–3	Eleftheria Indoor Hall (Nicosia)	3rd place
2012–13	UEFA Futsal Cup	Main round (Group 1)	(Bulgaria)	FC Grand Pro Varna	5–3	Eleftheria Indoor Hall (Nicosia)	3rd place
2012–13	UEFA Futsal Cup	Main round (Group 1)	(Italy)	Luparense F.C.	1–5	Eleftheria Indoor Hall (Nicosia)	3rd place
2013–14	UEFA Futsal Cup	Main round (Group 4)	(Slovenia)	FC Litija	1–6	Eleftheria Indoor Hall (Nicosia)	4th place
2013–14	UEFA Futsal Cup	Main round (Group 4)	(England)	Baku United FC	0–1	Eleftheria Indoor Hall (Nicosia)	4th place
2013–14	UEFA Futsal Cup	Main round (Group 4)	(Czech Republic)	Era-Pack Chrudim	0–5	Eleftheria Indoor Hall (Nicosia)	4th place
2019–20	UEFA Futsal Champions League	Preliminary round (Group D)	(Turkey)	Gazi Üniversitesi SK	8–2	Eleftheria Indoor Hall (Nicosia)	1st place
2019–20	UEFA Futsal Champions League	Preliminary round (Group D)	(Iceland)	Vængir Júpiters	8–1	Eleftheria Indoor Hall (Nicosia)	1st place
2019–20	UEFA Futsal Champions League	Preliminary round (Group D)	(Slovakia)	ŠK Pinerola Bratislava	5–5	Eleftheria Indoor Hall (Nicosia)	1st place
2019–20	UEFA Futsal Champions League	Main round (Group 6)	(Croatia)	Novo Vrijeme	2–5	Gradski Sportski Centar Makarska (Makarska)	4th place
2019–20	UEFA Futsal Champions League	Main round (Group 6)	(North Macedonia)	Shkupi	4–7	Gradski Sportski Centar Makarska (Makarska)	4th place
2019–20	UEFA Futsal Champions League	Main round (Group 6)	(Armenia)	Leo	5–6	Gradski Sportski Centar Makarska (Makarska)	4th place
2020–21	UEFA Futsal Champions League	Preliminary round (Knockout)	(San Marino)	F.C. Fiorentino Futsal	6–0	Eleftheria Indoor Hall (Nicosia)	Qualified
2020–21	UEFA Futsal Champions League	Round of 32 (Knockout)	(Hungary)	MVFC Berettyóújfalu	0–2	Eleftheria Indoor Hall (Nicosia)	Eliminated
