= Spyros Kyprianou Athletic Center =

Indoor arena located in Limassol, Cyprus

- Spyros Kyprianou Arena, Palais des sports
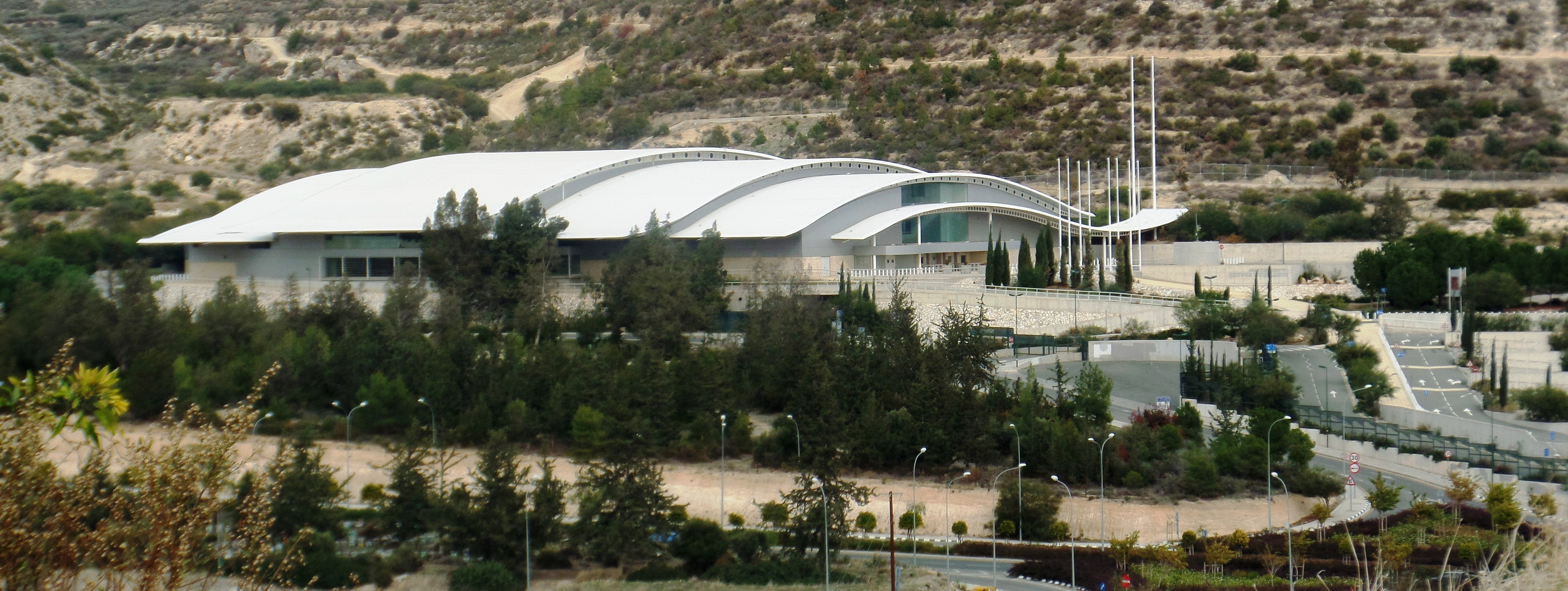
- Interactive map of Spyros Kyprianou Athletic Center
- Location: Kato Polemidia, Limassol, Cyprus
- Coordinates: 34°42′50.96″N 32°59′56.56″E
- Owner: Cyprus Sports Organisation
- Capacity: 6,255 (2005–2024); 8,000 (EuroBasket 2025)
- Surface: Versatile
- Field size: 80m x 80m

Construction
- Groundbreaking: November 2002
- Built: 2002–2005
- Opened: 2005
- Renovated: 2024–2025
- Expanded: 2024–2025
- Cost: CYP 8,5 million (EUR 14,5 million)
- Architects: Theocharis David, FAIA
- Project manager: Lysandros Kyriakou
- Structural engineer: Kal Engineering
- Services engineer: M-E Engineers
- General contractor: CYBARCO

Tenants
- AEK Karava VC; Nea Salamis VC; Anagennisi Germasogeias BC (women)

The Spyros Kyprianou Athletic Center or Spyros Kyprianou Sports Centre (Greek: Αθλητικό Κέντρο "Σπύρος Κυπριανού", romanized: Athlitikó Kéntro "Spýros Kyprianoú"), also known as Spyros Kyprianou Arena and Palais des sports, is an indoor arena located in the Kato Polemidia district of Limassol, Cyprus. Opened in late 2005, it is named after the late president of Cyprus, Spyros Kyprianou and is the largest event hall in the country.

== History ==
This project was conducted by the Cyprus Sports Organisation (Greek: Κυπριακός Οργανισμός Αθλητισμού) and was constructed north of the city of Limassol near Kato Polemidia and by the side of Limassol–Troodos road. Construction of the project began in late 2002 and was completed at the end of 2005 at a total cost of approximately CY£8.5 million.

The shuttle of the centre could originally host more than 6,255 spectators and at least 42 wheelchair spots. From August 2025, after renovation work is completed, it will have an increased seating capacity of 8,000. The work began in August 2024 and is being carried out by company A&A Apostolidis, assigned by the public works department through a public tender process.

== Events ==
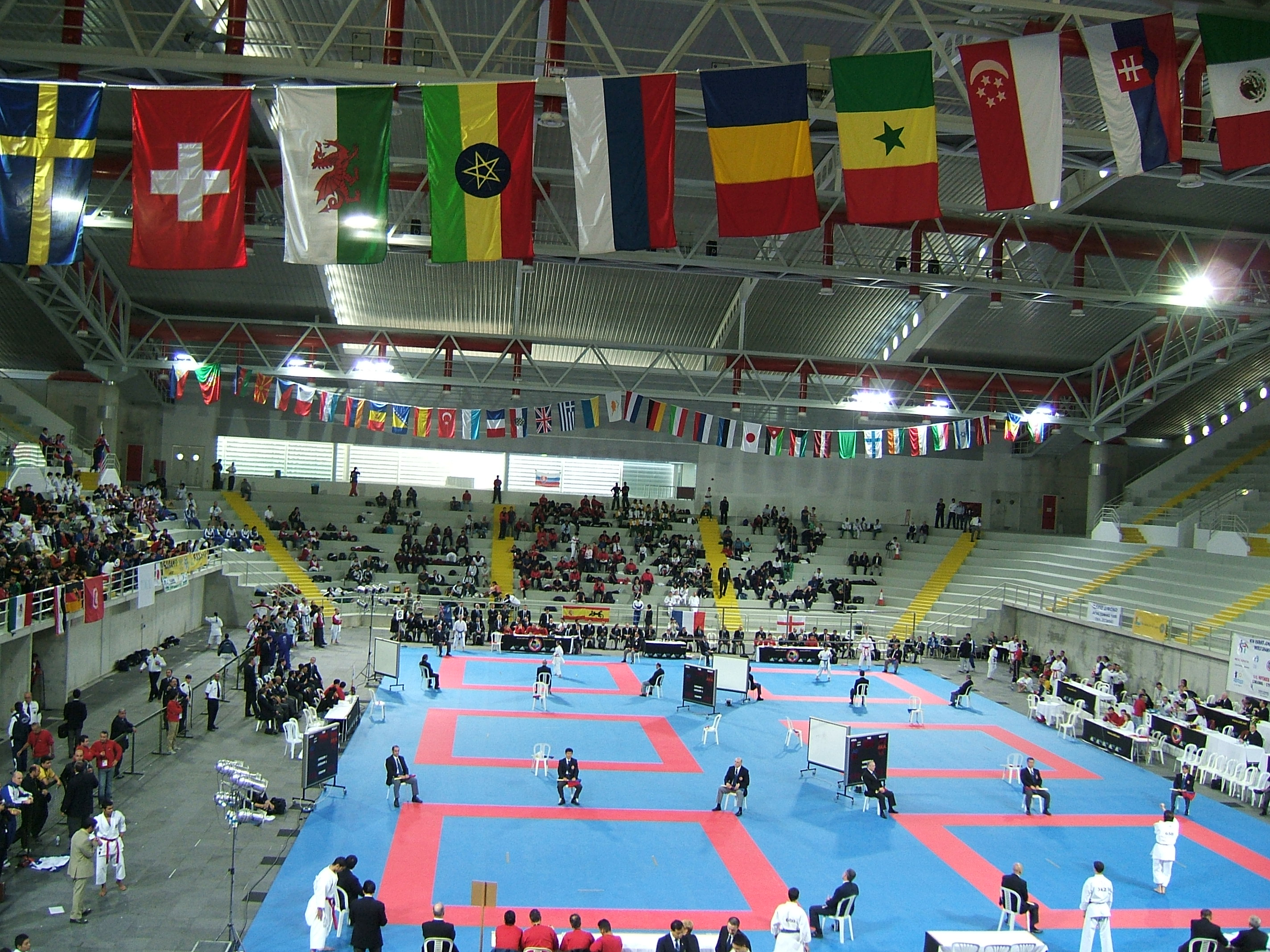
2005 World Junior & Cadet Karate Championships

The centre's arena has already hosted major sports events like the FIBA's EuroChallenge all-star basketball game from 2006 to 2008. It also played host to the Cyprus Rally headquarters for the 2005 and 2006 editions. The arena itself hosted the media and rally organisers while the parking lot was the area for the competing World Rally Championship teams.

The arena hosted the Junior Eurovision Song Contest 2008. Moreover, the centre is used especially for the sport events of local schools in Limassol greater area. It is also the home of the volleyball teams Nea Salamis Famagusta and AEK Karava-Lampousa.

The arena hosted Group C stage of the FIBA EuroBasket 2025. For that purpose, the arena was renovated between August 2024 and June 2025.
