= Lefkotheo =

Indoor arena in Nicosia, Cyprus

Coordinates: 35°8′51″N 33°18′55″E

Lefkotheo Indoor Arena
- Interactive map of Lefkotheo Indoor Arena
- Location: Engomi, Nicosia
- Owner: Cyprus Sport Organisation
- Capacity: 3,000

Construction
- Opened: 1982

Tenants
- APOEL BC; APOEL Futsal; APOEL VC

The Lefkotheo Indoor Hall is an indoor arena in Nicosia, Cyprus. It is located next to the Makario Stadium, with which it shares a common car parking lot. It has a crowd capacity of 3,000 seated spectators. Currently, the arena is used by the basketball, volleyball and futsal departments of APOEL Nicosia.

== History ==
Lefkotheo Indoor Hall was the first major indoor sports hall to be constructed in Cyprus. Its construction was finished in 1980. It mainly caters to basketball, volleyball, futsal and handball matches, but it can also be converted to host badminton, gymnastics, and boxing matches.

The arena hosted many events during the 1989 Games of the Small States of Europe.
