= AMEK Kapsalou =

Cypriot football club

- Founded: 1956; 69 years ago

AMEK Kapsalou is a Cypriot association football club based in Kapsalos, Limassol. It has 7 participations in Cypriot Fourth Division.
