= AEK Katholiki =

Cypriot football club

- Founded: 1981, 2010
- Dissolved: 1997

AEK Katholiki is a Cypriot football club based in Limassol. The team was playing sometimes in Cypriot Third Division. In 1997 were merged with Achilleas Ayiou Theraponta to form AEK/Achilleas Ayiou Theraponta. AEK/Achilleas Ayiou Theraponta dissolved in 2005 and AEK Katholiki refounded at 2010.
