= APOEL Futsal =

APOEL
- Full name: Athletikos Podosferikos Omilos Ellinon Lefkosias
- Nickname: Τhrylos (The Legend)
- Founded: July 2012; 14 years ago
- Ground: Lefkotheo Indoor Arena, Nicosia, Cyprus
- Capacity: 3,000
- Manager: (Cyprus) Tommys Chrysostomou
- League: Cypriot First Division
- 2020–21: 1st
Home colours	Away colours

APOEL Futsal is a professional futsal team based in the city of Nicosia, Cyprus and it is a part of the APOEL multi-sport club. APOEL is one of the most successful futsal clubs in Cyprus with an overall tally of 6 Championships, 5 Cups and 1 Super Cup.

== History ==
APOEL's futsal team was formed in 2012 as APOEL City Futsal F.S.C., after APOEL board came to an agreement with City Futsal F.S.C. to take their place in the Cypriot First Division for the 2012–13 season. The team had a successful first season, finishing fourth in the league and reaching the semi-finals of the cup. One year after its establishment, the club was renamed to APOEL.

In the 2013–14 season, the team achieved their first domestic double, winning both the season's Cypriot First Division and the Cypriot Cup, their first two major trophies after only two years of existence as a futsal club. The next season (2014–15), APOEL became double winners for second year in a row, after winning again the Cypriot First Division and the Cypriot Cup. During the 2015–16 season, APOEL achieved a historical domestic treble by winning all the Cypriot competitions trophies, the league, the cup and the super cup.

APOEL Futsal returned to winning ways by claiming its 7th championship in the 2025–26 season, defeating AEL Limassol 3–0 in the final.

=== European campaigns ===
After winning the double in the 2013–14 season, APOEL qualified for the first time for the European competitions, participating in the 2014–15 UEFA Futsal Cup. They entered the preliminary round of the competition and they hosted all the Group D matches in Nicosia's Tasos Papadopoulos - Eleftheria Indoor Hall. APOEL managed to qualify for the main round by winning all their matches, beating FC Anzhi Tallinn 5–3, KF Flamurtari Vlorë 9–1 and NAFI Stuttgart 10–1. APOEL were eventually eliminated at the main round of the UEFA Futsal Cup, finishing in the third place of Group 6 with 4 points, after losing 1–5 against Slov-Matic Bratislava, beating MVFC Berettjóújfalu 3–2 and drawing 3–3 with Vegakameratene.

In the 2016–17 season, APOEL participated for the third consecutive time in the UEFA Futsal Cup. They entered the preliminary round of the competition and they managed to qualify for the main round by winning AFM Maniacs 9–7, JB Gentofte 4–3 and drawing 7–7 with the hosts ASUE Yerevan. APOEL were eventually eliminated at the main round of the UEFA Futsal Cup, finishing in the third place of Group 6 with 4 points, after drawing 3–3 with City'US Târgu Mureș, losing 0–7 against Era-Pack Chrudim and beating 6–5 ŠK Pinerola Bratislava.

== Last squad ==
The following players played the 2021–22 UEFA Futsal Champions League.

#	Position	Name	Nationality
1	Goalkeeper	Paraskevas Psilogenis	(Cyprus)
2	Winger	George Eleftheriou	(Cyprus)
5	Defender	Charis Koulloupas	(Cyprus)
7	Winger	Savvas Omirou	(Cyprus)
8	Pivot	Dimitris Dimitriou	(Cyprus)
9	Pivot	Guilherme Mosna	(Brazil)
11	Pivot	Panagiotis Skarparis	(Cyprus)
12	Winger	Lambros Vassiliou	(Cyprus)
13	Winger	Dimitris Nikolaidis	(Cyprus)
14	Winger	Alexis Tsitsos	(Cyprus)
15	Goalkeeper	Christoforos Konialis	(Cyprus)
16	Goalkeeper	Konstantinos Mertzanidis	(Greece)
18	Defender	Rafinha	(Brazil)
20	Defender	Eleftherios Pericleous	(Cyprus)

== Technical and medical staff ==
Technical staff
Head coach	(Cyprus) Tommys Chrysostomou
Fitness coach	(Cyprus) Achilleas Toumazos
Goalkeeping coach	(Cyprus) Christos Antoniou
Medical staff
Team Physio	(Cyprus) Charis Stavrou

== League and Cup history ==
R16 = Last 16, QF = Quarter-finals, SF = Semi-finals, RU = Runners-up, W = Winners .

Season	League								Cup	Super Cup	UEFA Futsal Cup	Notes
Season	Division	Position	Played	Won	Drawn	Lost	Goals	Points	Result	Result	Result	Notes
2012–13	1st	4th	22	11	3	8	100 – 85	36	SF	—	—	^{[A]}
2013–14	1st	1st	24	21	0	3	157 – 59	63	W	—	—	^{[B]}
2014–15	1st	1st	22	18	1	3	154 – 56	55	W	—	Main round	^{[C]}
2015–16	1st	1st	24	20	3	1	120 – 44	63	W	W	Main round	^{[D]}
2016–17	1st	3rd	20	15	1	4	134 – 49	46	QF	RU	Main round	

Last update: 28 April 2017

A. Competed as APOEL City Futsal F.S.C.
B. APOEL achieved their first domestic double.
C. APOEL's debut in the European competitions.
D. APOEL achieved their first domestic treble.

== Honours ==
- Cypriot Championship

Winners (7): 2013–14, 2014–15, 2015–16, 2017–18, 2020–21, 2021-22, 2025-26

- Cypriot Cup

Winners (5): 2013–14, 2014–15, 2015–16, 2021-22, 2022-23

- Cypriot Super Cup

Winners (2): 2015, 2026

== European competitions record ==
Last update: 24 August 2021

UEFA competitions
Competition	Played	Won	Drawn	Lost	Goals For	Goals Against	Goal Difference	Last season played
UEFA Futsal Cup	15	7	3	5	67	66	+1	2016–17
UEFA Futsal; Champions League	6	1	0	5	16	25	-9	2021–22
Total	21	8	3	10	83	91	-8	

=== Matches ===
P = Preliminary round, M = Main round, E = Elite round, FF = Final Four, F = Final

Season	Competition	Round	Country	Club	Result	Venue (Host City)	Qualified
2014–15	UEFA Futsal Cup	Preliminary round (Group D)	(Estonia)	FC Anzhi Tallinn	5–3	Eleftheria Indoor Hall (Nicosia)	1st place
2014–15	UEFA Futsal Cup	Preliminary round (Group D)	(Albania)	KF Flamurtari Vlorë	9–1	Eleftheria Indoor Hall (Nicosia)	1st place
2014–15	UEFA Futsal Cup	Preliminary round (Group D)	(Germany)	NAFI Stuttgart	10–1	Eleftheria Indoor Hall (Nicosia)	1st place
2014–15	UEFA Futsal Cup	Main round (Group 6)	(Slovakia)	Slov-Matic Bratislava	1–5	Pálfi István; Rendezvénycsarnok (Berettyóújfalu)	3rd place
2014–15	UEFA Futsal Cup	Main round (Group 6)	(Hungary)	MVFC Berettyóújfalu	3–2	Pálfi István; Rendezvénycsarnok (Berettyóújfalu)	3rd place
2014–15	UEFA Futsal Cup	Main round (Group 6)	(Norway)	Vegakameratene	3–3	Pálfi István; Rendezvénycsarnok (Berettyóújfalu)	3rd place
2015–16	UEFA Futsal Cup	Main round (Group 1)	(Georgia (country))	Georgians Tbilisi	1–5	Eleftheria Indoor Hall (Nicosia)	4th place
2015–16	UEFA Futsal Cup	Main round (Group 1)	(France)	Kremlin-Bicêtre United	3–4	Eleftheria Indoor Hall (Nicosia)	4th place
2015–16	UEFA Futsal Cup	Main round (Group 1)	(Russia)	TTG-Ugra Yugorsk	3–10	Eleftheria Indoor Hall (Nicosia)	4th place
2016–17	UEFA Futsal Cup	Preliminary round (Group A)	(Switzerland)	AFM Futsal Maniacs	9–7	FFA Academy Stadium (Yerevan)	1st place
2016–17	UEFA Futsal Cup	Preliminary round (Group A)	(Denmark)	JB Futsal Gentofte	4–3	FFA Academy Stadium (Yerevan)	1st place
2016–17	UEFA Futsal Cup	Preliminary round (Group A)	(Armenia)	ASUE Yerevan	7–7	FFA Academy Stadium (Yerevan)	1st place
2016–17	UEFA Futsal Cup	Main round (Group 6)	(Romania)	City'US Târgu Mureș	3–3	Zimní Stadión (Chrudim)	3rd place
2016–17	UEFA Futsal Cup	Main round (Group 6)	(Czech Republic)	Era-Pack Chrudim	0–7	Zimní Stadión (Chrudim)	3rd place
2016–17	UEFA Futsal Cup	Main round (Group 6)	(Slovakia)	ŠK Pinerola Bratislava	6–5	Zimní Stadión (Chrudim)	3rd place
2018–19	UEFA Futsal; Champions League	Main round (Group 5)	(Bosnia and Herzegovina)	Mostar SG Staklorad	4–0	Eleftheria Indoor Hall (Nicosia)	2nd place
2018–19	UEFA Futsal; Champions League	Main round (Group 5)	(Sweden)	Uddevalla	2–5	Eleftheria Indoor Hall (Nicosia)	2nd place
2018–19	UEFA Futsal; Champions League	Main round (Group 5)	(Italy)	Acqua e Sapone	1–6	Eleftheria Indoor Hall (Nicosia)	2nd place
2021–22	UEFA Futsal; Champions League	Preliminary round (Group G)	(Andorra)	Encamp	1–2	Dais Sports Hall (Athens)	4th place
2021–22	UEFA Futsal; Champions League	Preliminary round (Group G)	(Austria)	Diamant Linz	6–7	Dais Sports Hall (Athens)	4th place
2021–22	UEFA Futsal; Champions League	Preliminary round (Group G)	(Greece)	Doukas	2–5	Dais Sports Hall (Athens)	4th place
