= AEL Limassol =

Multi-sport club in Cyprus

- Full name: Αθλητική Ένωση Λεμεσού; Athlitiki Enosi Lemesou
- Nicknames: Γαλαζοκίτρινοι (The Blue-yellows); Λέοντες (The lions)
- Founded: 4 October 1930; 96 years ago
- Ground: Alphamega Stadium
- Capacity: 10,830
- President: Konstantinos Konstantinou
- Manager: Hugo Martins
- League: First Division
- 2025–26: First Division, 8th of 14
- Website: ael.com.cy
Home colours	Away colours

Athlitiki Enosi Lemesou (Greek: Αθλητική Ένωση Λεμεσού, lit. 'Athletic Union of Limassol') is a Cypriot sports club based in the city of Limassol, Cyprus, best known for its football team.

AEL Limassol also maintains a men's and women's basketball teams, a women's volleyball team and a (newly established in 1976) Futsal team, a women's handball team as well as a cricket team.

The sponsor of the club is Meridian Sport.

== History ==
The club was founded on 4 October 1930, with Stavros Pittas serving as the club's first president. The football section of the club competed in its first game on 6 January 1931 against PSC, winning 6–1 in Limassol. The club won the national championship in 1934 though this is not credited as it is an unofficial title. Later that year, AEL became one of the eight founding members of the Cypriot First Division for the 1934–35 season, the first official league of the country.

AEL Limassol celebrated its first official title success in 1941, defeating APOEL 4–3 in a two-legged championship play-off. AEL fans had to wait 12 years until tasting title success again, as the club finally became champions of Cyprus again in 1953. AEL would twice repeat this success, winning back-to-back league championships in 1955 and 1956. Theirs goalscorer Sevim Ebeoğlu who played between 1950–1957 for AEL won the top-scorer award in 1952–53 and 1954–55 seasons.

The club won its last major trophy in 1989 – before the title success of 2012 – when it defeated city rivals Aris Limassol 3–2 after extra time in final of the Cypriot Cup.

In 2011, after disappointingly finishing in seventh-place in the previous campaign, AEL hired Pambos Christodoulou, who had a reputation of steering "modest sides away from relegation", to start the club's rebuilding process. AEL Limassol secured the Cypriot league title for the first time since 1968 on 5 May 2012, ending a 44-year drought without a Cypriot first division title.

Christodoulou had a dream-like first season at the helm AEL, as his side was unbeaten and had not conceded any goals through the first five games. At the end of the second round, AEL finished top of the table, three points clear of the second placed team and had only conceded seven goals, the best defensive record of all the league teams. In the play-off round, AEL battled with the top four teams for the championship, winning it with one game to spare and conceding only nine goals. As Christodoulou has managed to bring AEL the championship crown, he was nicknamed by fans "Pambourinho", a combination of his name and of esteemed manager José Mourinho.

AEL received the championship trophy during a spectacular "fiesta" evening at the Tsirio Stadium on the evening of Saturday 12 May 2012. They followed this with an open-top bus parade through Limassol. Up to 12,000 AEL fans packed the stadium to watch the fiesta and trophy presentation.

The club then turned their attention to the Cup Final of 16 May against Omonia and the chance to be crowned double winners for the first time in club history; the club, however, lost 1–0 in the final. The following year, AEL made it to the group stage of a UEFA tournament for the first time, finishing last and picking up four points in their UEFA Europa League group.

On 22 October 2013, Angolan manager Lito Vidigal was sacked after just over three months in charge. Bulgarian Ivaylo Petev was appointed as AEL's manager on 25 October, having previously guided Ludogorets Razgrad to promotion to the A Group as well as two A Group titles, a Bulgarian Cup win as well as a triumph in the Bulgarian Super Cup. Petev signed an initial deal to stay at AEL until the end of the 2014–15 season.

At the end of the 2013–14 season, AEL finished in first place in the initial phase of the competition. Going into the championship match against APOEL on 17 May 2014, AEL needed only a draw to secure their second league title in three years. The match, however, was abandoned (at 0–0) after 52 minutes when firecrackers thrown by AEL fans struck APOEL player Kaká. The match was replayed behind closed doors at a neutral stadium on 31 May 2014, and APOEL achieved to win their second consecutive league title after beating AEL 1–0, courtesy of a Cillian Sheridan goal. On 6 June 2014, the Cyprus Football Association's (CFA) disciplinary committee – acting as an appeals board – unanimously cancelled on the CFA council's decision to repeat the 17 May championship final, awarding the match to APOEL with a 0–3 score. AEL winger Jorge Monteiro finished the season as joint-top scorer in the league with 18 goals, and the former Porto academy product was voted player of the year by the CFA. AEL finished in the 4th place of the championship of 2016–2017 and as a result the team won a place in the first qualifying round of Europa League. Furthermore, AEL achieved to go up to third qualifying round from a not fair play game from the referee Artyom Kuchin and the players of Austria Wien. The referee had shown the white dot of the penalty for a ghost foul outside of the box of AEL and a red card for AEL defender Marco Airosa in the twenty second minute. AEL had fight for the win for the whole game to achieve two goals that send her in the play-offs but the score finished 1–2.

== AEL Limassol 1930 ==
The football department of AEL is legally owned by AEL Football (Public) Ltd (Greek: ΑΕΛ Ποδόσφαιρο Δημόσια ΛΤΔ), a public limited company, from 2009 until 31 May 2023. The company's main activity is the management, operation and commercial exploitation of AEL Football club. After the vote of confidence by the AEL Board of Directors, from 1 June 2023 the football team will pass into the hands of our association.

== Stadium ==
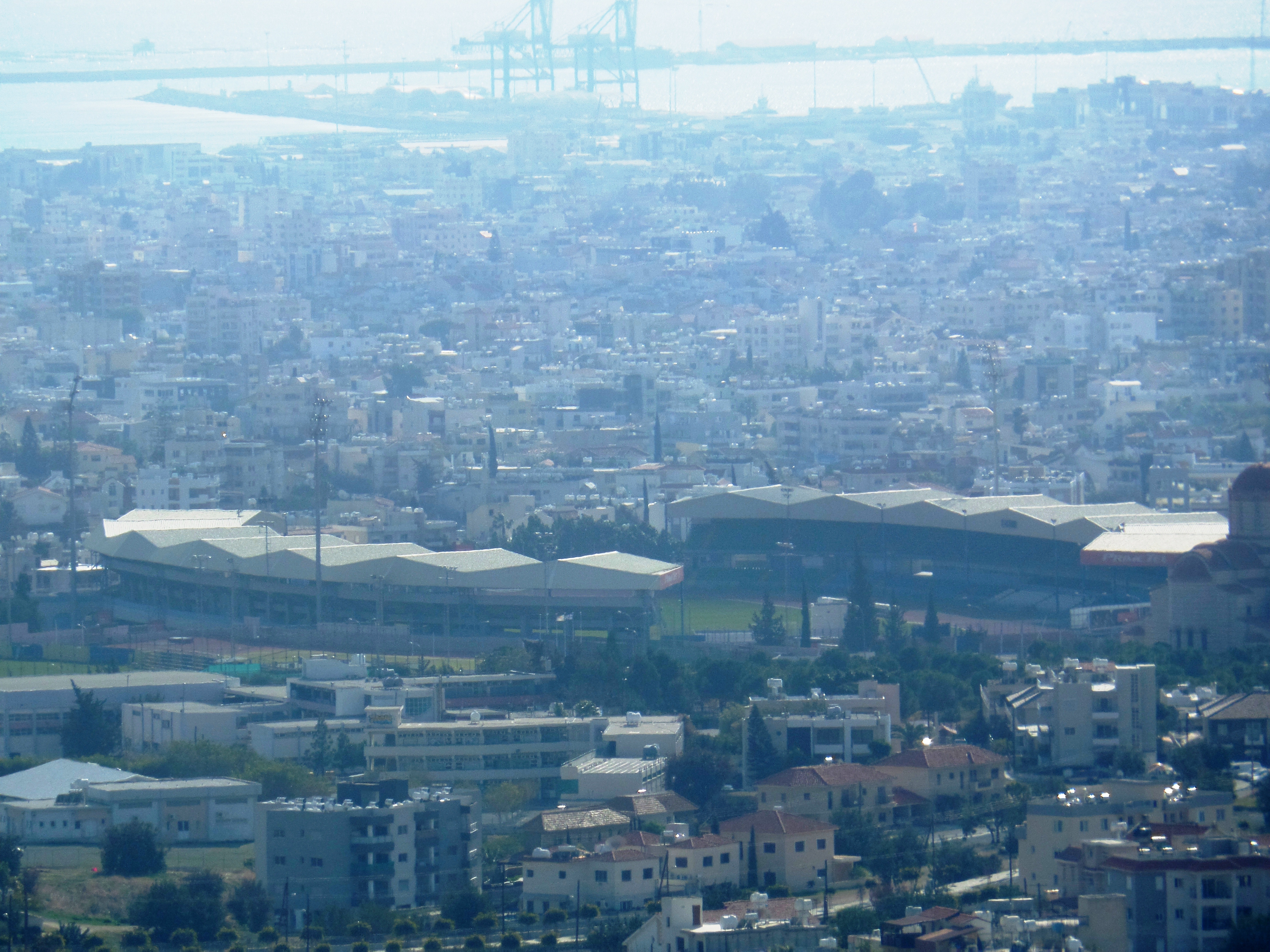
Tsirion Stadium

From 1975 to 2022, AEL Limassol played its home matches at the 13,331-seat Tsirio Stadium in Limassol.

After construction, the Alphamega Stadium replaced Tsirio Stadium as the home ground of AEL Limassol. The first match at the new stadium was ΑΕL vs Olympiakos, with a score of 2–0 on 23 December 2022. The capacity of the new stadium is 10,700 seats.

== Current squad ==
As of 15 September 2026

Note: Flags indicate national team as defined under FIFA eligibility rules; some limited exceptions apply. Players may hold more than one non-FIFA nationality.

No.	Pos.	Nation	Player
1	GK	GRE	Stefanos Kapino
2	DF	CYP	Andreas Karo
4	DF	SUR	Stefano Denswil
6	MF	MKD	Davor Zdravkovski (captain)
7	FW	BIH	Hamza Čataković
8	MF	POR	Bruno Almeida
9	FW	MNE	Stevan Jovetić
10	MF	FRA	Rémi Oudin
11	MF	RSA	Luther Singh (vice-captain)
14	FW	SEN	Yannick Gomis
17	MF	CYP	Daniil Paroutis
19	DF	SRB	Ivan Milosavljević (vice-captain)
20	MF	POR	João Tavares
22	DF	CYP	Kypros Neophytou
23	DF	POR	Diogo Gomes

No.	Pos.	Nation	Player
26	MF	FRA	Jayden Peti Peti
30	MF	CYP	Giorgos Papageorgiou
33	DF	CYP	Evagoras Antoniou
35	DF	POR	Sérgio Conceição
37	MF	SVK	Július Szöke (vice-captain)
70	DF	CYP	Kyriakos Kyriakou
74	GK	ALG	Samy Merzouk
75	MF	CYP	Simonas Christophi
77	MF	CMR	François Mughe
80	MF	POR	Jair Tavares
84	FW	CYP	Christos Karamanis
88	MF	POR	Cafú
98	GK	CYP	Panayiotis Kyriakou
99	FW	NGR	Geoffrey Chinedu (on loan from Krylia Sovetov)

=== Out on loan ===
Note: Flags indicate national team as defined under FIFA eligibility rules; some limited exceptions apply. Players may hold more than one non-FIFA nationality.

No.	Pos.	Nation	Player
—	GK	CYP	Christos Neophytides (at AEP Polemidion until 31 May 2027)
—	DF	CYP	Stylianos Christodoulou (at AEP Polemidion until 31 May 2027)
—	DF	CYP	Theoklitos Polychroniou (at Ermis Aradippou until 31 May 2027)
—	MF	CYP	Panayiotis Panayi (at PAEEK Kyrenia until 31 May 2027)

No.	Pos.	Nation	Player
—	MF	CYP	Antonis Antoniou (at AEP Polemidion until 31 May 2027)
—	MF	CYP	Savvas Christodoulou (at Akritas Chlorakas until 31 May 2027)
—	FW	CYP	Alexandros Efstathiou (at MEAP Nisou until 31 May 2027)

== Current staff ==
Technical staff
General Football Director	(North Macedonia) Ivan Trickovski
Technical Director	(Ivory Coast) Joël Damahou
General Manager	(Cyprus) Efthymios Agathokleous
Team Manager	(Cyprus) Angelos Perikleous
Head Coach	(Portugal) Hugo Martins
Assistant Coaches	(Cyprus) Georgios Eleftheriou
Assistant Coaches	(Portugal) Paulo Monteiro
Goalkeeping Coach	(Portugal) Paulo Grilo
Fitness Coach	(Portugal) André Gomes
Match Analyst	(Portugal) Braz Ferreira
Rehabilitation Fitness Coach	(Cyprus) Giannis Vasilopoulos
Head Scouter	(Cyprus) Giannis Theodorou
Scouter	(Cyprus) Nikos Englezou
Video Scouter	(Cyprus) Michalis Eleftheriadis
Medical staff
Head Doctor	(Cyprus) Dr. Theodoros Philippou
Chiropractor	(Cyprus) Dr. Nikos Poullis
Nutrionist	(Cyprus) Kostas Nikolaou
Head Physiotherapist	(Cyprus) Polys Achilleos
Physiotherapists	(Cyprus) Kimonas Papamiltiadous
Physiotherapists	(Cyprus) Demos Paliosofitis
Physiotherapists	(Cyprus) Savvas Kleonikou
Other staff
Kit Assistant	(Cyprus) Kyriakos Kyriakou
Host Assistant	(Cyprus) Zoe Efthymiou
Host Assistant	(Cyprus) Eleni Stephanou
Head Caregiver	(Cyprus) Andreas Kakoullis
Caregivers	(Cyprus) Marko Vitorović
Caregivers	(Philippines) Christian Martínez

== Honours ==
Type	Competition	Titles	Seasons
Domestic	Cypriot First Division	6	1940–41, 1952–53, 1954–55, 1955–56, 1967–68, 2011–12
Domestic	Cypriot Second Division	1	1996–97
Domestic	Cypriot Cup	7	1938–39, 1939–40, 1947–48, 1984–85, 1986–87, 1988–89, 2018–19
Domestic	Cypriot Super Cup	4	1953, 1968, 1985, 2015

- record
- ^{s} shared record

== UEFA club coefficient ranking ==
UEFA Team Ranking (2025/26)

=== UEFA Club ranking ===
Rank	Country	Team	Points
219	(Cyprus)	Apollon Limassol	7.138
220	(Cyprus)	Anorthosis Famagusta	7.138
221	(Cyprus)	AEL Limassol	7.138
222	(Bulgaria)	Levski Sofia	7.000
223	(Scotland)	Hibernian	7.000

Last update: 12 March 2026

== European record ==
1R = First round, PR = Preliminary round, Q = Qualifying round, PO = play-off round.

Season	Competition	Round	Club	1st leg	2nd leg	Aggregate
1968–69	European Cup	1R	(Spain) Real Madrid	0–6	0–6	0–12
1985–86	European Cup Winners' Cup	1R	(Czechoslovakia) Dukla Prague	2–2	0–4	2–6
1987–88	European Cup Winners' Cup	PR	(Czechoslovakia) DAC Dunajská Streda	0–1	1–5	1–6
1989–90	European Cup Winners' Cup	1R	(Austria) Admira Wacker	0–3	1–0	1–3
2002–03	UEFA Cup	QR	(Hungary) Ferencváros	0–4	2–1	2–5
2012–13	UEFA Champions League	2Q	(Northern Ireland) Linfield	3–0	0–0	3–0
2012–13	UEFA Champions League	3Q	(Serbia) Partizan	1–0	1–0	2–0
2012–13	UEFA Champions League	PO	(Belgium) Anderlecht	2–1	0–2	2–3
2012–13	UEFA Europa League	Group C	(France) Marseille	1–5	3–0	4th place
2012–13	UEFA Europa League	Group C	(Turkey) Fenerbahçe	0–1	0–2	4th place
2012–13	UEFA Europa League	Group C	(Germany) Borussia Mönchengladbach	0–0	0–2	4th place
2014–15	UEFA Champions League	3Q	(Russia) Zenit	1–0	0–3	1–3
2014–15	UEFA Europa League	PO	(England) Tottenham Hotspur	1–2	0–3	1–5
2017–18	UEFA Europa League	1Q	(Gibraltar) St Joseph's	4–0	6–0	10–0
2017–18	UEFA Europa League	2Q	(Luxembourg) Progrès Niederkorn	1–0	2–1	3–1
2017–18	UEFA Europa League	3Q	Austria Wien	0–0	1–2	1–2
2019–20	UEFA Europa League	2Q	(Greece) Aris	0–0	0–1	0–1
2021–22	UEFA Europa Conference League	2Q	(Albania) Vllaznia	1–0	1–0	2–0
2021–22	UEFA Europa Conference League	3Q	(Azerbaijan) Qarabağ	1–1	0–1	1–2

== Historical list of coaches ==
- (Cyprus) Dimitris Tsiepis (1930 –1932)
- (Greece) Argiris Gavalas (1932 –1946)
- (Cyprus) Costas Vasiliou (1946 –1948)
- (Greece) Argiris Gavalas (1948 –1956)
- (Cyprus) Spiros Elia
- (Austria) Ferdinard Ceplar
- (Greece) Christos Christodoulou
- (Austria) Ulhen Fitz
- (Greece) Georgios Eisaggeleas
- (Cyprus) Costas Pambou "Mavrokolos"
- (Romania) Nicolae Simatoc (1962 –1963)
- (Cyprus) Loizos Pantelidis (1968 –1969)
- (Czech Republic) František Havránek (1984 –1986)
- (Czech Republic) Valér Švec (1986 –1988)
- (Czech Republic) Dušan Uhrin (1988 –1989)
- (Czech Republic) Jiri Dunaj (1989 –1990)
- (Czech Republic) František Cipro (1990 –1992)
- (Federal Republic of Yugoslavia) Željko Sanković (1992)
- (Russia) Anatoliy Byshovets (1993)
- (Federal Republic of Yugoslavia) Tomislav Kaloperović (1993 –1995)
- (Cyprus) Andreas Kissonergis (1995)
- (Germany) Diethelm Ferner (1995 –1996)
- (Bulgaria) Apostol Chachevski (1996 –1997)
- (Hungary) Kálmán Mészöly (1997 –1998)
- (Cyprus) Panicos Orphanides (1998 – 1999)
- (Cyprus) Loizos Mavroudis (2000)
- (Cyprus) Andreas Michaelides (Jul 2000 –Sept 2002)
- (Greece) Giannis Matzourakis (Sep 2002 –Nov 2003)
- (Netherlands) Henk Houwaart (Nov 2003 –31 Dec 2004)
- (Ukraine) Oleh Protasov (Dec 2004 –Mar 2005)
- (Cyprus) Andreas Michaelides (Mar 2005 – May 2005)
- (Slovenia) Bojan Prašnikar (1 Jul 2005 – 30 Nov 2005)
- (Cyprus) Loizos Mavroudis (Feb 2006 – May 2006)
- (Cyprus) Panicos Orphanides (1 July 2006 – 31 Jan 2007)
- (Israel) Eli Guttman (1 Feb 2007 – 1 Dec 2007)
- (Portugal) Mariano Barreto (4 Dec 2007 – 5 Feb 2008)
- (Cyprus) Andreas Michaelides (6 Feb 2008 – 28 Jan 2009)
- (Romania) Mihai Stoichiță (28 Jan 2009 – 20 May 2009)
- (Israel) Nir Klinger (1 Aug 2009 – 1 Dec 2009)
- (Czech Republic) Dušan Uhrin, Jr. (1 Jan 2010 – 21 Sep 2010)
- (Romania) Mihai Stoichiță (22 Sep 2010 – 7 Feb 2011)
- (Netherlands) Raymond Atteveld (7 Feb 2011 – May 2011)
- (Cyprus) Pambos Christodoulou (24 Mar 2011 – 22 Oct 2012)
- (Portugal) Jorge Costa (24 Oct 2012 – 22 May 2013)
- (Angola) Lito Vidigal (1 Jul 2013 – 22 Oct 2013)
- (Bulgaria) Ivaylo Petev (25 Oct 2013 – 17 Nov 2014)
- (Cyprus) Christakis Christoforou (17 Nov 2014 – 19 Oct 2015)
- (Greece) Makis Chavos (27 Oct 2015 – 8 Feb 2016)
- (Cyprus) Pambos Christodoulou (8 Feb 2016 – 7 Mar 2017)
- (Portugal) Bruno Baltazar (22 Mar 2017 – 5 Mar 2018)
- (Bosnia and Herzegovina) Dušan Kerkez (5 Mar 2018 – 6 Dec 2021)
- (Greece) Savvas Pantelidis (8 Dec 2021 – 20 May 2022)
- (Portugal) Silas (21 May 2022 – 17 Sep 2022)
- (North Macedonia) Čedomir Janevski (17 Sep 2022 – 14 Apr 2023)
- (Cyprus) Christos Charalabous (14 Apr 2023 – 10 Oct 2023)
- (Finland) Toni Koskela (15 Oct 2023 – 22 Jan 2024)
- (Cyprus) Alexis Garpozis (22 Jan 2024 – 15 May 2024)
- (Wales) Chris Coleman (25 May 2024 – 27 Nov 2024)
- (Cyprus) Marinos Satsias (27 Nov 2024 – 24 Jan 2025)
- (Cyprus) Marios Nicolaou (26 Jan 2025 – 26 May 2025)
- (Italy) Paolo Tramezzani (2 Jun 2025 – 24 Sep 2025)
- (Portugal) Hugo Martins (29 Sep 2025 –)

== Presidential history ==
#	Name	From	To	Period
1.	Stavros Pittas	1930	1932	2yrs
2.	Kriton Tornaritis	1932	1934	2yrs
3.	Yiangos Limanititis	1934	1953	19yrs
4.	Nikos Solomonides	1953	1971	18yrs
5.	Nikos Kountas	1971	1976	5yrs
6.	Georgios Tornaritis	1976	1982	6yrs
7.	Loris Lysiotis	1982	1996	14yrs
8.	Dimitris Solomonides	1996	2002	6yrs
9.	Giorgos Frantzis	2002	2003	1yrs
10.	Akis Ellinas	2003	2005	2yrs
11.	Agis Agapiou	2005	2006	1yrs
12.	Marios Herodotou	2006	2007	1yrs
13.	Zacharias Koundouros	2007	2008	1yrs
14.	Andreas Sofocleous	2008	2022	14yrs
15.	Costas Christodoulou	2018	2022	4yrs
16.	Nicos Christodoulides	2022	2024	2yrs
17.	Konstantinos Konstantinou	2024	Present	

== AEL Football Academies ==
- Cypriot U21 Championships: 13

1940, 1951, 1960, 1973, 1978, 1983, 1984, 1989, 1998, 1999, 2000, 2002, 2008

- Cyprus U21 Cup: 1

1997

- Cypriot U19 Championships: 1

2018

- Cypriot U17 Championships: 6

2004, 2005, 2007, 2011, 2012, 2018

- Cypriot U16 Championships: 1

2017

- Cypriot U15 Championships: 2

2005, 2009

- Cypriot U14 Championships: 1

2025

- Elite Neon Cup - Silver Cup (U14): 1

2025

- Cypriot U13 Championships: 3

2006, 2008, 2017

== AEL Limassol departments ==
=== AEL Limassol B.C. (TRIA EKA AEL) ===
Since 1966, AEL sports club maintains both men's and women's professional basketball teams.

The men's team won the 2002–03 FIBA Europe Regional Challenge Cup, thereby making AEL the only Cypriot sports club to have won a European title.

Both the men's and women's basketball team are considered to be the most successful teams in Cyprus in terms of trophies won and therefore both teams are referred to by Basketball fans and enthusiasts as "The Queen " (Greek: "Η Βασίλισσα").

=== AEL FUTSAL ===
The futsal club was founded in 2009 and the same year became a member of the Cyprus Futsal Federation. AEL Futsal won its first trophy during the 2016–17 season, by winning the 2016–17 Cypriot Futsal Cup.

In 2022–23, the team won its first Cypriot Futsal Championship. In the same season, the team also had the chance to win what would be the domestic futsal treble (Championship, Cup and Super Cup), by reaching the Cypriot Futsal Cup final, however AEL was defeated in the final. The club did however manage to win the 2023 Cypriot Futsal Super Cup, defeating APOEL 8–2 in the final.

As 2023 Cypriot Futsal Champions, AEL participated in the 2023–24 UEFA Futsal Champions League, reaching the last 32 stage of the competition, which is a Cypriot first.

In 2023–24 AEL won its second Futsal championship by defeating AC Omonia 9–1.

Futsal Team Titles
Cypriot Futsal Championship	3	(2023, 2024, 2025)
Cypriot Futsal Cup	2	(2017, 2024)
Cypriot Futsal Super Cup	3	(2023, 2024, 2025)

=== AEL Limassol Women's Volleyball Club (RoboMarkets AEL) ===
Fullname	RoboMarkets ΑΕΛ
Nicknames	Βασίλισσα (Greek); Queen (English)
Tranbunker Danoi ΑΕΛ founded	1976
Team Colors	Yellow With Blue
Arena	Nicos Solomonides
Arena Nickname	Το κλουβί (Greek); The Cage (English)
Arena Capacity	3,000

Women Volleyball Team Titles
Championship titles:	30	(1977, 1978, 1979, 1980, 1981, 1982, 1983, 1984, 1985, 1986, 1987, 1988, 1989, 1990, 1991, 1993, 1994, 1995, 1996, 1997, 1998, 1999, 2000, 2001, 2002, 2005, 2008, 2009, 2012, 2021)
Cup titles:	28	(1978, 1980, 1981, 1982, 1983, 1984, 1985, 1986, 1987, 1988, 1989, 1990, 1991, 1992, 1993, 1994, 1995, 1996, 1997, 1998, 1999, 2000, 2001, 2002, 2003, 2005, 2006, 2011)
Super Cup titles:	13	(1995, 1996, 1997, 1998, 1999, 2000, 2005, 2006, 2007, 2008, 2009, 2011, 2026)
Women U21 Volleyball Team Titles
Championship titles:	11	(1987, 1988, 1991, 1996, 1999, 2000, 2002, 2004, 2008, 2009, 2010)
Cup titles:	5	(2000, 2002, 2004, 2009, 2010)
Women U17 Volleyball Team Titles
Championship titles:	11	(1995, 1996, 1999, 2000, 2001, 2002, 2003, 2004, 2006, 2008, 2009)
Cup titles:	1	(2000)

A founding member of the Cyprus Volleyball Federation in 1976, AEL's women team has dominated in the Cypriot volleyball. Out of the 32 seasons played so far in Cyprus since the commencement of the women's volleyball league, the team won the Championship 27 times. Out of the 31 cups they won it 27 times, 24 consecutive times, from 1980 until 2003. They have also won the Championship 15 consecutive times, from 1977 until 1991. They have won the Double 12 times from 1980 until 1991 and 9 times from 1993 until 2001. The club also had a men's team for 10 years which participated in the Cypriot Championship.

=== Bowling team ===
The bowling club was founded in 1999 and the same year became a member of the Limassol District Federation. In 2001, the team participated in the Cypriot Championship as one of the two representatives of the Limassol District Federation. In the team won its first trophy by winning the Limassol District Federation Cup and in 2006 its first Championship by winning the Limassol District Federation Championship. The home of the team is the Galaktika Bowling Center.

Player
(Cyprus) Andros Kalogirou
(Cyprus) Christos Antoniou
(Cyprus) Christos Crassas
(Cyprus) Christos Georgiades
(Cyprus) Kleanthis Kilaniotis
(Cyprus) Michalis Konstantinou
(Cyprus) Michalis Perikleous
(Cyprus) Matthaios Armeftis
(Cyprus) Panikos Konstantinou
(Cyprus) Stelios Potamitis

Bowling Team Titles
Limassol Championship:	5	(2006, 2008, 2009, 2010, 2023)
Limassol Cup:	5	(2003, 2004, 2005, 2007, 2009)

=== Billiards team ===
The idea to create an AEL billiards team started in September 2008 with Dimitris Dimitriou as the leader and took "flesh and bones" on September 10, 2010. AEL-Billiards from its first participation showed that it will be the star and that they will be among the great teams of Cyprus.

The first match took place on October 4, 2010, away from home against the BREAK-TEAM team and AEL won with a score of 4–1. This date coincides with the founding of the club in 1930! They started with 6 wins in 6 matches this season, AEL finished in 3rd place, just 1 point from 2nd place leading to the all-Cypriot final-four. A point of reference is that from the first year it had victories over all its rival teams. AEL's HEADQUARTERS were located in the "DYNAMIC PoolHall". The first roster of AEL billiards club consisted of:

Player
(Cyprus) Stelios Avgousti (C)
(Cyprus) Sotiris Neophytou
(Cyprus) Friksos Gavriel
(Cyprus) Marios Constantinou
(Cyprus) Giannis Theocharous

Billiards club Titles
Cyprus Pro-League	1	(2013–14)
Cypriot Championship (eight–ball),	1	(2019)
Cypriot Championship (ten–ball)	1	(2019)

=== Cycling team ===
The cycling team was founded in 2001 and the same year became a member of the Limassol District Federation. The first men's cycling team consisted of the following : Κωνσταντίνος Ιωάννου, Στέλιος Βασιλάκης, Χριστόφορος Στεφάνου, Αλέξης Κέστας, Mark Williams, Σταύρος Αντωνίου, Χρίστος Παναγιώτου, William de Doncker.

Cycling Team Titles
General – Road cup:	3	(2004, 2005, 2006)
Men – Road cup:	3	(2004, 2005, 2006)
Masters 1 – Road cup:	1	(2006)
Masters 2 – Road cup:	3	(2004, 2005, 2006)

=== Esports team ===
AEL has also an esports department.

=== Boxing team ===
The boxing team was formed in 2023 and trains at the AEL boxing gym at Nicos Solomonides Arena.

=== Rugby team ===
In 2025, long standing rugby club Limassol Crusaders formally dissolved and became AEL Limassol Rugby.

== Defunct sports departments ==
Apart from the currently active sports departments, AEL had in the past some other sports departments, which today are defunct. Despite this, these currently not active departments had all won titles for AEL when they were active.

=== Field hockey ===
In the past AEL Limassol had a field hockey team which is currently not active. The team had plenty of victories led by its star player Renos Antoniadis. In 1931, AEL won the Cup in a match which was played in Larnaca. One year later, the team became Cypriot Champions. The team consisted of the following players: Antoniadis, Pareas, Frangos, Christophides, Michaelides, Kalogirou, Victor Mousteris, Anastasiadis and Williamson. However, there were no further hockey competitions in Cyprus afterwards, as the other hockey teams of the era closed down their hockey departments because of financial problems.

=== Handball ===
Another AEL sport department that currently does not exist is the handball. The team was active for a small period of time but that did not stop the team from adding another trophy to the hundreds that AEL won in various other sports. On 11 June 1989, a day after the football team of the club won the Cypriot Cup, the handball team won the Cypriot Cup in handball by beating Youth Centre Larnaca 23–19 in the final which was played in Lefkotheo Indoor Hal, Nicosia.

=== Volleyball ===
AEL maintains 3 teams for women's volleyball but does not currently have a men's Volleyball team.

=== Waterpolo ===
AEL was also active in maritime sports, especially those that needed team participation. AEL pioneered in Regattas in 1932, 1933 and 1934 in the Cyprus Regatta Games. The members of the team were Nearchos Pieris, Christakis Dixon, Andreas Araouzos, Sotiris Antoniades and Maximos Morides. The club had also a waterpolo team which was unbeaten Cypriot Champions. The team achieved a noted victory against a selected team of the Royal Navy which were then Mediterranean Champions. Apart from the Cypriot Championships, AEL won the Mediterranean Naval Cup.
